= Romance of the Three Kingdoms (TV series) =

1994 Chinese television series

- DVD cover art

Chinese name
- Traditional Chinese: 三國演義
- Simplified Chinese: 三国演义
Transcriptions
Standard Mandarin
- Hanyu Pinyin: Sānguó Yǎnyì
- Genre: Historical drama
- Based on: Romance of the Three Kingdoms by Luo Guanzhong
- Screenplay by: Du Jiafu; Li Yibo; Zhou Kai; Zhu Xiaoping; Ye Shisheng; Liu Shusheng
- Directed by: Wang Fulin (Head director); Zhang Shaolin (13 episodes); Shen Haofang (16 episodes); Sun Guangming (12 episodes); Zhang Zhongyi (15 episodes); Cai Xiaoqing (28 episodes)
- Starring: Sun Yanjun; Tang Guoqiang; Bao Guo'an; Wu Xiaodong; Lu Shuming; Li Jingfei; Hong Yuzhou
- Theme music composer: Gu Jianfen
- Opening theme: Gungun Changjiang Dongshishui (滚滚长江东逝水) performed by Yang Hongji
- Ending theme: Lishi De Tiankong (历史的天空) performed by Mao Amin
- Composers: Gu Jianfen; Li Yiding; Wang Xian
- Country of origin: China
- Original language: Mandarin
- No. of episodes: 84

Production
- Executive producers: You Shijun; Zhang Guangqian; Shan Yusheng; Zhang Jizhong; Hao Heming
- Producers: Wang Feng; Ren Dahui; Dai Linfeng; Yang Weiguang; Zhang Tianmin; Yu Changhua; Zhou Ming; Liu Jinru
- Production locations: Hebei; Inner Mongolia; Sichuan; Ningxia; Gansu; Qinghai; Tibet; Jiangsu; Hubei; Yunnan
- Cinematography: Chen Jun; Wang Dianchen; Liu Shuliang; Bi Fujian; Zhang Shaolin; Zhao Xinchang; Gu Qiming
- Running time: 45 minutes per episode
- Production company: CCTV

Original release
- Network: CCTV
- Release: 23 October 1994 – 20 February 1995

Romance of the Three Kingdoms is a Chinese television series adapted from the classical 14th century novel of the same title by Luo Guanzhong. The series was produced by China Central Television (CCTV) and was first aired on the network in 1994. It spanned a total of 84 episodes, each approximately 45 minutes long. One of the most expensive television series produced at the time, the project cost 170 million yuan. It was completed over four years and involved over 400,000 cast and crew members, including divisions of the People's Liberation Army from the Beijing, Nanjing and Chengdu military regions. Some of the dialogue spoken by characters was adapted directly from the novel. Extensive battle scenes, such as the battles of Guandu, Red Cliffs and Xiaoting, were also realized using a large array of live actors and extras.

The series is widely seen as among the best period dramas in China and has been praised for capturing the epic scale of the novel's story, themes and characters while maintaining its artistic and historical value. The show has a 9.5 rating on Douban from over 89,030 reviews.

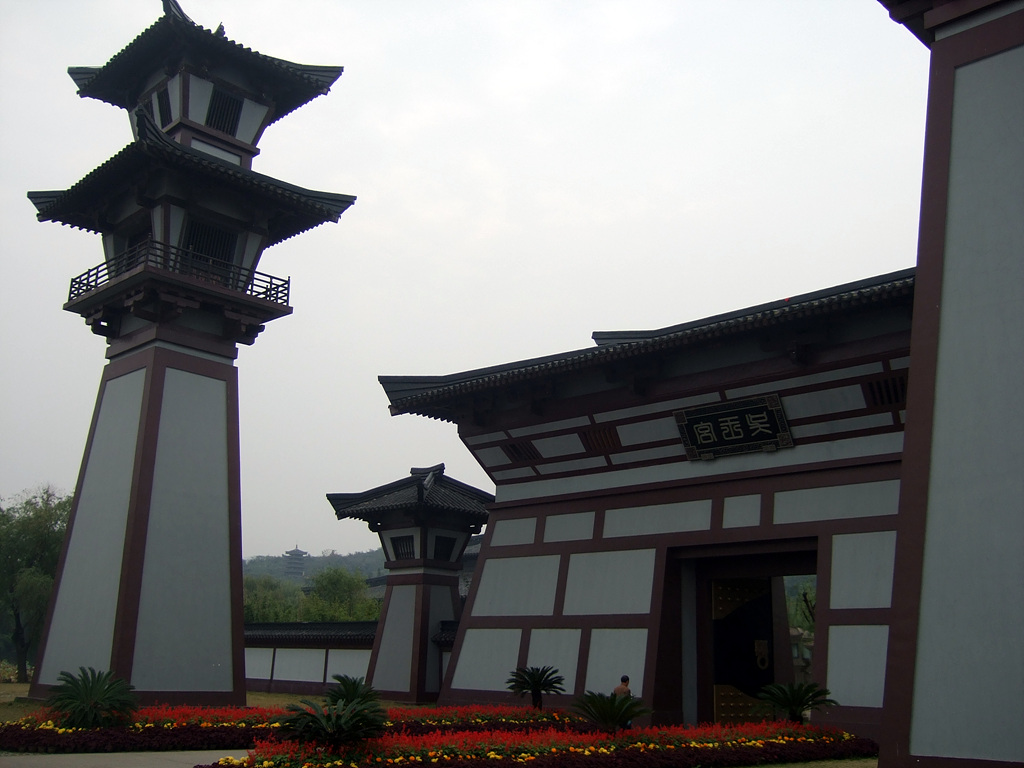
Palace film set at Wuxi, built for the filming of Romance of the Three Kingdoms.

== List of episodes ==
The series is divided into five parts and each part has a different executive producer and director(s).

=== Part One ===
- Title: 第一部：群雄逐鹿 (Part One: Heroes compete for power)
- Executive producer: You Shijun
- Director(s): Shen Haofang, Cai Xiaoqing

#	Rough translation of title (in English)	Original title (in Chinese)
1	Oath of the Peach Garden	桃园三结义
2	The Ten Attendants cause political turmoil	十常侍乱政
3	Dong Zhuo takes control of the capital	董卓霸京师
4	Cao Cao presents a sword	孟德献刀
5	The three heroes fight Lü Bu	三英战吕布
6	The Chain-links Strategy	连环计
7	Fengyi Pavilion	凤仪亭
8	Offering Xu Province thrice	三让徐州
9	Sun Ce builds a dynasty	孙策立业
10	Shooting an arrow through a halberd	辕门射戟
11	Battle of Wancheng	宛城之战
12	White Gate Tower (part 1)	白门楼 (上)
13	White Gate Tower (part 2)	白门楼 (下)
14	Discussing about heroes over drinks	煮酒论英雄
15	Yuan Shao and Cao Cao mobilise their armies	袁曹起兵
16	Guan Yu lists three conditions	关羽约三事
17	Returning riches and a seal	挂印封金
18	A lone journey over a thousand li	千里走单骑
19	Reunion in Gucheng	古城相会
20	Sun Ce's death	孙策之死
21	Battle of Guandu (part 1)	官渡之战 (上)
22	Battle of Guandu (part 2)	官渡之战 (下)
23	Yuan Shao is defeated	大破袁绍

=== Part Two ===
- Title: 第二部：赤壁鏖战 (Part Two: The Battle of Red Cliffs)
- Executive producer: Zhang Guangqian
- Director: Cai Xiaoqing, Zhang Zhongyi

#	Rough translation of title (in English)	Original title (in Chinese)
24	Leaping across the Tan Stream on horseback	跃马檀溪
25	Liu Bei seeks the virtuous	刘备求贤
26	Turning back to recommend Zhuge Liang	回马荐诸葛
27	Three visits to the thatched cottage	三顾茅庐
28	The inferno at Bowang Slope	火烧博望坡
29	Assisting the people across the river	携民渡江
30	Arguing with the Confucian scholars	舌战群儒
31	Cleverly instigating Zhou Yu	智激周瑜
32	Zhou Yu's plan goes to waste	周瑜空设计
33	The Heroes' Gathering	群英会
34	Borrowing arrows with straw boats	草船借箭
35	The Self-torture Ruse	苦肉计
36	Pang Tong presents the Chain-links Strategy	庞统献连环
37	Thrusting a spear and composing a poem	横槊赋诗
38	Zhuge Liang prays for the wind	诸葛祭风
39	Burning of the Red Cliffs	火烧赤壁
40	Seizing Nan Commandery by wit	智取南郡
41	Conquering the four commanderies	力夺四郡
42	The Beauty Scheme	美人计
43	Ganlu Temple	甘露寺
44	Return to Jing Province	回荆州
45	Zhou Yu is infuriated thrice	三气周瑜
46	The Crouching Dragon attends a funeral	卧龙吊孝
47	Slicing off beard and discarding robe	割须弃袍

=== Part Three ===
- Title: 第三部：三国鼎立 (Part Three: Emergence of the Three Kingdoms)
- Executive producer: Shan Yusheng
- Director: Sun Guangming, Zhang Zhongyi

#	Rough translation of title (in English)	Original title (in Chinese)
48	Zhang Song presents a map	张松献图
49	Liu Bei enters Sichuan	刘备入川
50	The Phoenix falls at a slope	凤雏落坡
51	Righteously releasing Yan Yan	义释严颜
52	Conquering western Sichuan	夺战西川
53	Attending a banquet alone and armed with only a blade	单刀赴会
54	Battle of Hefei	合肥会战
55	Contention for the succession	立嗣之争
56	Mount Dingjun	定军山
57	Strategic capture of Hanzhong	巧取汉中
58	Drowning the seven armies	水淹七军
59	Leaving Maicheng	走麦城
60	Cao Cao's death	曹操之死
61	Cao Pi usurps the Han throne	曹丕篡汉
62	Campaign against Wu	兴兵伐吴
63	Burning of the linked camps	火烧连营
64	Calmly holding off five enemy forces	安居平五路

=== Part Four ===
- Title: 第四部：南征北战 (Part Four: Battles in the south and north)
- Executive producer: Zhang Jizhong
- Director: Zhang Shaolin

#	Rough translation of title (in English)	Original title (in Chinese)
65	Troops cross the Lu River	兵渡泸水
66	Seeking a path out in dire straits	绝路问津
67	Meng Huo is captured seven times	七擒孟获
68	Northern Expedition	出师北伐
69	Winning over Jiang Wei	收姜维
70	Sima Yi returns	司马复出
71	Empty Fort Strategy	空城退敌
72	Sima Yi obtains a seal	司马取印
73	Battle of wits at Mount Qi	祁山斗智
74	Zhuge Liang disguises himself as a god	诸葛妆神
75	Six campaigns on Mount Qi	六出祁山
76	The fire is extinguished in Shangfang Valley	火熄上方谷
77	Autumn winds on the Wuzhang Plains	秋风五丈原

=== Part Five ===
- Title: 第五部：三分归一 (Part Five: Three united as one)
- Executive producer: Hao Hengmin
- Director: Zhang Zhongyi

#	Rough translation of title (in English)	Original title (in Chinese)
78	Feigning illness to trick Cao Shuang	诈病赚曹爽
79	Conflict in the Wu palace	吴宫干戈
80	Siege of Mount Tielong	兵困铁笼山
81	Sima Zhao commits regicide	司马昭弑君
82	Nine campaigns on the Central Plains	九伐中原
83	Stealth march to Yinping	偷渡阴平
84	Three united under Jin	三分归晋

== Cast ==
Due to the time taken to complete the project (four years), there were numerous instances of (1) multiple actors portraying the same character or (2) the same actor taking on multiple roles. An example of case (1) was the character Zhang Liao, who was portrayed by Xu Shaohua in episode 12, Zhang Yakun in episode 39, and Wang Weiguo in episode 54. Chen Zhihui was an extreme example of case (2) because he took on four roles – three as generals from Wei, Shu and Wu (Xu Chu, Liao Hua and Taishi Ci) and one as minor warlord Bao Xin. Two other prominent examples of case (2) were Wu Xiaodong and Hong Yuzhou – the former portrayed Sun Jian in episode 5 and Sun Quan from episode 30 onwards; the latter portrayed a young Yuan Shao in episode 5 and Zhou Yu from episode 9 onwards.

=== Main cast ===
- Sun Yanjun as Liu Bei
- Tang Guoqiang as Zhuge Liang
- Bao Guo'an as Cao Cao
- Lu Shuming as Guan Yu
- Li Jingfei as Zhang Fei
- Wu Xiaodong as Sun Quan / Sun Jian
- Hong Yuzhou as Zhou Yu / Yuan Shao (younger)

=== Other cast ===
Sorted by role in alphabetical order

- Du Wenlu as Ahuinan
- Xue Wencheng as Bao Long
- Chen Zhihui as Bao Xin
- Liu Shaochun as Bao Zhong
- Li Fengying as Lady Bian
- Liu Xiaomei as Lady Cai (Liu Biao's wife)
- Li Hua as Cai He
- Me Yue as Cai Mao
- Qin Zhao as Cai Yong
- Li Xiaozhou as Cai Zhong
- An Zhiyi as Cao Fang
- Huoercha / Bala Zhu'er / Wang Jie as Cao Hong
- Wang Han as Cao Huan
- Li Ming as Cao Jie
- Ji Chenmu as Cao Mao
- Yang Junyong as Cao Pi
- Tai Zuhui / Xu Deshan as Cao Ren
- Wang Guanghui as Cao Rui
- Kang Ming as Cao Shuang
- Chi Chonggen as Cao Xi
- Sun Zhencai as Cao Xun
- Zheng Qiang as Cao Zhen
- Wang Liangbo as Cao Zhi
- Wang Changli as Chen Deng
- Li Jianyi / Xiu Zongdi as Chen Gong
- Niu Chaliang as Chen Gui
- Wang Tao as Chen Lin
- Chen Debao / Zhang Shijun as Chen Shi
- Zhang Shijun as Chen Qun
- Liu Yinglu as Chen Tai
- Dong Jiuru as Cheng Bing
- Zhang Ping as Cheng Ji
- Yan Huaili / Chen Zhuanliang as Cheng Pu
- Dai Jingguo / Yu Lianzeng as Cheng Yu
- Ren Meng as Cheng Zi
- Zhou Wanhong as Chunyu Qiong
- Zhuang Li as Lady Cui
- Li Songqiao as Cui Liang
- Zhao Xiaochuan as Cui Zhouping
- Wang Hongguang as Deng Ai
- Li Zhiyi as Deng Zhi
- Wu Wenqing as Deng Zhong
- Zhang Jiatian as Dian Wei
- Chen Hong as Diaochan
- Liu Shaochun / Wang Yi / Yang Baohe as Ding Feng
- Rui Lirong as Ding Yuan
- Lü Zhong as Empress Dowager Dong
- Liu Long as Dong Cheng
- Qin Baolin as Dongtuna
- Li Po as Dong Zhuo
- Wei Yingming as Duan Gui
- Liu He as King Duosi
- Zhang Xuting as Eheshaoge
- Shi Laiqun / Zhang Minfu as Fa Zheng
- Wei Deshan as Fan Qiang
- Qi Wenqiang as Fei Yao
- Li Hong as Fei Yi
- Yi Shufen / Guo Shuping as Lady Gan
- Han Dong / Zhang Yuhai as Gan Ning
- Yuan Lijian as Gao Xiang
- Yang Fan as Gongsun Zan
- Li Yanping as Gu Yong
- Ding Zhiyong / Chen Bing as Guan Ping
- Li Wei as Guan Xing
- Chang Yuping / Sun Qicheng as Guo Huai
- Jiang Kai as Guo Jia
- Guo Shouyang as Guo Tu
- Zhu Jun as Han Dang
- Yu Rongguang as Han Fu
- Yang Zibin as Han Hao
- Sude Siqin as Han Meng
- Huang Xiaoli as Han Xuan
- Li Shicai as Hao Zhao
- Zheng Tianwei as Empress He
- Zhang Fuyuan as He Jin
- Ye Jinsen as Hu Ban
- Jiang Chongxia as Hu Lie
- Qi Jianbo as Hu Yuan
- Yu Weijie as Huche'er
- Wang Zhongxin as Hua Tuo
- Song Ge as Hua Xin
- Wen Hao as Huan Fan
- Wang Hongwu as Huang Chengyan
- Wu Guicen / Xu Fuyin as Huang Gai
- Zeng Ge as Huang Hao
- Wang Hongtao as Huang Zhong
- Qiao Chen as Huang Zhong's wife
- Wang Hongtao as Ji Ling
- Ding Zhicheng as Ji Ping
- Han Xinmin as Jia Chong
- Xu Yongliang / Li Xuliang as Jia Xu
- Su Jianyu as Jian Shuo
- An Ji as Jian Yong
- Zhou Zhou as Jiang Gan
- Liu Xi as Jiang Ji
- Liu Hongkun as Jiang Wan
- Zhang Tianshu as Jiang Wei (younger)
- Fan Zhiqi as Jiang Wei (older)
- Zhang Dengqiao as Jiang Wei's mother
- Wang Zhiqiang as Ju Shou
- Zhang Xiqian as Kan Ze
- Zheng Rong as Kong Rong
- Ma Jichun as Kuai Yue
- Zhang Yingwu / Sang Bao / Zhang Jinghai as Li Dian
- Wang Qiang / Zhang Jimin as Li Feng
- Li Bao'an as Li Fu
- Wang Zhiqiang as Li Hui
- Bi Yanjun as Li Ru
- Yang Aifu as Li Sheng
- Yan Yansheng as Li Su
- Mang Lai / Chen Zhihui / Du Wenlu as Liao Hua
- Wang Gang / Han Zengxiang as Ling Tong
- Ma Zijun as Liu Bei and Lady Sun's wedding emcee
- Zhu Feng as Liu Bian, Emperor Shao of Han
- Zhang Da as Liu Biao
- Chen Xu as Liu Chen
- Liang Chi as Liu Cong
- Huo Ercha as Liu Dai
- Zhao Zhenping as Liu Feng
- Liu Zongren as Liu Gui
- Yin Li as Liu Qi
- Li Tie as Liu Shan (younger)
- Lu Jixian as Liu Shan (older)
- Yin Shen / Su Ke as Liu Xie, Emperor Xian of Han (younger)
- Bao Dazhi as Liu Xie, Emperor Xian of Han (older)
- Xiao Lu / Ma Yusen / Wei Xian as Liu Ye
- Liang Zhenya as Liu Zhang
- Zhao Piyu as Lu Ji
- Cao Li / Song Banggui / Ma Yuliang as Lu Su
- Gao Fei as Lu Xun
- Yang Zhaoquan as Lu Zhi
- Cao Shixiang as Lü Boshe
- Zhang Guangbei as Lü Bu
- Liu Yan as Lü Bu's daughter
- Gao Baobao as Lü Bu's wife
- Suo Eryong as Lü Fan
- Chu Guoliang / Guo Molang as Lü Meng
- An Yaping as Ma Chao
- Li Jianping / Chen Guanxin as Ma Dai
- Wang Xianhe / Li Ping as Ma Liang
- Zhang Zhizhong as Ma Su
- Huang Wenjun as Ma Teng
- Zhang Hao as Ma Zhong
- Qin Baolin as Ma Zun
- Zhou Huilin as Mao Jie
- Zhang Nan as Meng Da
- Hu Zhanli as Meng Huo
- Yan Fengqi as Meng Jian
- Li Yankui as Meng Jie
- Sude Siqin as Meng Tan
- Li Dongguo as Meng You
- Xu Di / Wang Luyao as Lady Mi
- Kui Heguo as Mi Fang
- Zhu Bingqian / Yang Naihuang / Ren Dongsheng as Mi Zhu
- Zhang Xuting as King Midang
- Pang Daxin as Pan Ying
- Hei Shuikuan / Sun Qicheng as Pan Zhang
- Zhang Yuanpeng as Pang De
- Jin Shugui / Zhu Shibin as Pang Tong
- Guo Jiaqing as Pujing
- Jiang Jin as Elder Qiao
- Wang Fengwen as Qiao Zhou
- Chen Changlong as Qin Liang
- Wang Zhongxin as Qin Mi
- Liu Liwei as Qin Qi
- Zhao Piyu as Qiu Jian
- Wang Ying as Shao Ti
- Wang Xian as Shen Pei
- Ma Shuliang as Shi Tao
- Ji Chonggong as Shi Xu
- Zheng Xu as Shi Zuan
- Su Min as Sima Hui
- Pan Yinlai as Sima Shi (younger)
- Lei Tieliu as Sima Shi (older)
- Lü Suosen as Sima Wang
- Han Qing as Sima Yan
- Tang Zhenhuan as Sima Yi (younger)
- Wei Zongwan as Sima Yi (older)
- Li Chiyou as Sima Zhao (younger)
- Gao Lancun as Sima Zhao (older)
- Xu Hongda as Su Yue
- Zhao Yue as Lady Sun
- Pu Cunxin as Sun Ce
- Yang Jun as Sun Li
- Guo Jiaqiang / Xia Junyin as Sun Qian
- Pan Yueming as Sun Xiu
- Li Hongtao / Chen Zhihui as Taishi Ci
- Zhang Tong as Tao Qian
- Gao Baobao as Lady Tian
- Zhang Lianzhong as Tian Feng
- Wang Tiejun as Tian Si
- Chi Chonggen as Wang Fu
- Zhang Hongying as Wang Jing
- Dong Ji as Wang Lang
- Cui Dai as Wang Ping
- Yan Yansheng as Wang Su
- Zheng Dapeng as Wang Tao
- Xu Yun as Wang Youtong
- Tan Zongyao as Wang Yun
- Mo Qi as Wang Zhi
- Shi Changjin as Wang Zifu
- Liu Wei / Wang Xiaoying / Wang Shaowen / Wang Xinhai as Wei Yan
- Mang Lai / Bi Lige as Wen Ping
- Lin Moyu / Yu Ruojuan as Lady Wu
- Li Shicai as Wu Ban
- Liu Jianwei as Wu Fu
- Hong Zongxi as Wu Yayu
- Hong Ximai as Xi Zheng
- He Jing as Xiaoqiao
- Shi Tiansheng / Shen Shuangcun as Xiahou Ba
- Bala Zhu'er as Xiahou Dun
- Yang Lixin as Xiahou Jie
- Wang Jiming as Xiahou Mao
- Jiao Yucheng as Xiahou Shang
- Hao Yueguo as Xiahou Xuan
- Qian Yulin as Xiahou Yuan
- Ma Xingyue / Qin Baolin as Xin Pi
- Wang Jianguo / Lu Ying / Chen Zhihui / Han Dong as Xu Chu
- Huoercha / Nige Mutu / Li Dongguo / Liu Honglin / Xie Dong as Xu Huang
- Zhang Qin as Xu Jing
- Zhang Xiaoming as Xu Sheng
- Zhai Wanchen as Xu Shu
- Tantai Renhui as Xu Shu's mother
- Shi Xiaoman as Xu You
- Wang Ying as Xue Zong
- Yu Jianai as Xun You
- Gu Lan as Xun Yu
- Li Tan as Yan Jun
- Xie Jiaqi as Yan Liang
- Li Zhongbi / Wang Wenyou as Yan Yan
- Si Gengtian as Yang Feng
- Gao Xiaobao as Yang Ling
- Liu Jianwei as Yang Song
- Meng Xianli as Yang Yi
- Liu Longbin / Wang Hui as Yi Ji
- Chu Jianfu as Yu Fan
- Siqin Bilige / Qi Kejian as Yu Jin
- Zhou Wanhong as Yu Qiong
- Li Qingxiang as Yuan Shao (older)
- Chen Youwang / Wang Fusheng as Yuan Shu
- Deng Xiaoguang as Yuan Tan
- Shen Long as Yue Jin
- Ma Jingwu as Zhang Bao (Yellow Turban)
- Chi Guodong as Zhang Bao (Zhang Fei's son)
- Zhu Decang as Zhang Dang
- Wang Huanan / Xing Guozhou as Zhang He
- Tian Ye as Zhang Hu
- Yin Huasheng as Zhang Ji
- Yuan Zhiguang as Zhang Jiao
- You Shijun as Zhang Liang
- Xu Shaohua / Zhang Yakun / Wang Weiguo as Zhang Liao
- Ma Yuliang as Zhang Lu
- Xie Zhijian as Zhang Rang
- Zhou Zhonghe as Zhang Ren
- Zhang Ju as Zhang Song
- Wang Mianzhi as Zhang Wen
- Han Shanxu as Zhang Xiu
- Qi Wenqiang as Zhang Yi
- Zhou Jiwei as Zhang Zhao
- Li Baohua as Zhao Fan
- Gai Ke as Zhao Fan's sister-in-law
- Han Xinmin as Zhao Lei
- Zhang Shan as Zhao Yun (younger)
- Hou Yongsheng as Zhao Yun (older)
- Han Xinmin as Zheng Tai
- Guan Yue as Zhong Hui
- Liu Geng as Zhong Yao
- Liu Runcheng as Zhou Cang
- Yin Wei / Zhang Ying as Zhou Tai
- Li Yunjuan as Lady Zhurong
- Zhong Yujie / Wang Zhaogui as Zhuge Jin
- Shi Ni as Zhuge Jun
- He Bing as Zhuge Ke
- Su Chongshan as Zhuge Zhan

== Music ==
The music for the series was composed by Gu Jianfen and Li Yiding (李一丁).

#	Track title	Credits	Notes
1	滚滚长江东逝水 (pinyin: Gǔngǔn Chángjiāng Dōngshì Shuǐ) (translation: The Billowing Yangtze River Flows East)	Lyrics by Yang Shen; performed by Yang Hongji	The opening theme song and the ending theme song of episode 84.
2	这一拜 (pinyin: Zhè Yī Bài) (translation: This Oath)	Lyrics by Wang Jian; performed by Liu Huan	Played during the Peach Garden Oath scene in episode 1 and during the three brothers' reunion scene in episode 19 and the ending theme song of episode 19.
3	烈火雄风 (pinyin: Lièhuǒ Xíóngfēng) (translation: Raging Fire and Majestic Wind)	Lyrics by Wang Jian; performed by Lü Jianhong	Played during Lü Bu's riding scene in episode 3.
4	貂蝉已随清风去 (pinyin: Diāochán Yǐsuí Qīngfēng Qù) (translation: Diaochan Has Gone with the Wind)	Lyrics by Wang Jian; performed by Wan Shanhong	Played during the last scene showing Diaochan's departure in episode 7 and the ending theme song of episode 7.
5	淯水吟 (pinyin: Yùshuǐ Yín) (translation: Ode to the Yu River)	Lyrics by Wang Jian; performed by Mao Amin	Played during the Battle of Wancheng scene in episode 11 and when Cao Cao mourns those who died at Wancheng in episode 12.
6	明主求贤兮却不知吾 (pinyin: Míngzhǔ Qíuxián Xī Què Bùzhī Wú) (translation: The Wise Ruler Seeks Talents But Knows Me Not)	Lyrics by Luo Guanzhong	Played during the scene where Liu Bei meets Xu Shu in episode 25.
7	壮士功名尚未成 (pinyin: Zhuàngshì Gōngmíng Shàngwèi Chéng) (translation: A Hero Has Yet to Achieve Glory)	Lyrics by Zhu Xiaoping	Played during the scene showing Zhuge Liang's friends singing in episode 26.
8	谁肯论英雄 (pinyin: Shéikěn Lùn Yīngxióng) (translation: Who Would Talk About Heroes)	Lyrics by Zhu Xiaoping	Played during the scene showing Zhuge Liang's friends singing in episode 26.
9	一夜北风寨 (pinyin: Yīyè Běifēng Zhài) (translation: A Night in the Northern Wind Fort)	Lyrics by Luo Guanzhong	Played during Huang Chengyan's scene in episode 27.
10	有为歌 (pinyin: Yǒuwéi Gē) (translation: A Promising Song)	Lyrics by Wang Jian; performed by Dai Jianming	Played during Zhuge Liang's scene in episode 27.
11	民得平安天下安 (pinyin: Míndé Píng'ān Tiānxià Ān) (translation: The World is Peaceful When the People Are at Peace)	Lyrics by Wang Jian; performed by Cui Jinghao	Played during the scene showing Liu Bei crossing the river with civilians in episode 29.
12	当阳常志此心丹 (pinyin: Dāngyáng Chángzhì Cǐ Xīndān) (translation: A Heart of Courage in Dangyang)	Lyrics by Wang Jian; performed by Cui Jinghao	Played during Zhao Yun's heroics scene in episode 30.
13	豹头环眼好兄弟 (pinyin: Bàotóu Huányǎn Hǎo Xiōngdì) (translation: The Good Brother with a Leopard's Head and Big Round Eyes)	Lyrics by Wang Jian; performed by Yin Xiangjie	Played during Zhang Fei's scene in episode 30.
14	丈夫歌 (pinyin: Zhàngfū Gē) (translation: A Song for Men)	Lyrics by Luo Guanzhong; performed by Lü Jianhong	Played during Zhou Yu's dance scene in episode 33.
15	短歌行 (pinyin: Duǎngē Xíng) (translation: A Short Song)	Lyrics by Cao Cao; performed by Yang Hongji	Played during Cao Cao's poem recitation scene in episode 37.
16	子夜四时歌 (pinyin: Zǐyè Sìshí Gē) (translation: The Midnight Song)	Lyrics adapted from a Southern Dynasties era poem; performed in a Wu accent	Played during Liu Bei and Lady Sun's wedding scene in episode 43.
17	江上行 (pinyin: Jiāngshàng Xíng) (translation: Sail Along the River)	Lyrics by Wang Jian; performed by Cui Jinghao	Played during the scene showing Guan Yu's arrival by boat in episode 53.
18	七步诗 (pinyin: Qībù Shī) (translation: The Seven Steps Poem)	Lyrics by Cao Zhi; performed by Liu Huan	Played during Cao Zhi's poem recitation scene in episode 61.
19	哭诸葛 (pinyin: Kū Zhūgě) (translation: Crying Zhuge)	Lyrics by Wang Jian; performed by Liu Huan	Played during Zhuge Liang's funeral scene in episode 77.
20	历史的天空 (pinyin: Lìshǐ Dē Tiānkōng) (translation: The Sky of History)	Lyrics by Wang Jian; performed by Mao Amin	The ending theme song of Episode 1 to Episode 6 and Episode 8 to Episode 18 and Episode 20 to Episode 83.

== See also ==
- List of media adaptations of Romance of the Three Kingdoms
- Three Kingdoms (TV series)
