= Three Kingdoms (TV series) =

2010 Chinese historical series

- 三国
- Genre: Historical drama
- Based on: Romance of the Three Kingdoms by Luo Guanzhong
- Screenplay by: Zhu Sujin
- Directed by: Gao Xixi
- Starring: Chen Jianbin; Yu Hewei; Lu Yi; Peter Ho; Ni Dahong; Yu Rongguang; Zhang Bo; Nie Yuan; Chen Hao; Ruby Lin; Victor Huang; Yu Bin
- Theme music composer: Zhao Jiping
- Opening theme: "Give Me Back a World at Peace" by Liao Changyong
- Ending theme: "Heroes Cross Heaven and Earth" by Tan Jing; "A Blurry World" by Tang Can
- Country of origin: China
- Original language: Mandarin
- No. of episodes: 95

Production
- Producers: Yang Xiaoming; Li Shu; Zhang Shenyan
- Production location: China
- Running time: ≈45 minutes per episode
- Production companies: Communication University of China Television Production Centre; Beijing Galloping Horse Film; Anhui Five Star Oriental Television Investment; Tianjin Television; Beijing Dongfang Henghe Film Culture; Beijing Baimeng Film Planning; Beijing Lin Gao Flyule Film Media; Jilin Province Film Production Corporation

Original release
- Network: Jiangsu TV; Anhui TV; Chongqing TV; Tianjin TV
- Release: 2 May – 15 June 2010

Three Kingdoms (三国) is a 2010 Chinese historical drama television series based on the events of the late Eastern Han dynasty and the Three Kingdoms period of Chinese history. The plot is adapted from the 14th-century historical novel Romance of the Three Kingdoms and other stories about the Three Kingdoms period. Directed by Gao Xixi, the series had a budget of over 160 million yuan and took five years of pre-production work. Shooting of the series commenced in October 2008, and it was released in China in May 2010.

Three Kingdoms set a record as the most expensive small-screen series in China's television history at the time, having been sold to four regional broadcasters at a price of 160 million yuan. It was sold to over 20 countries, earning an estimated 800 million yuan in total as of May 2012.

== List of episodes ==
#	English title	Original title
1	To eliminate a traitor, Cao Cao presents a precious sword	除国贼曹公献宝刀
2	Chen Gong releases Cao Cao in righteousness	陈宫申正义释曹操
3	Cao Cao kills Lü Boshe by mistake	曹操疑错杀吕伯奢
4	Guan Yu slays Hua Xiong while the wine is still warm	关云长温酒斩华雄
5	Battle of Hulao - The three heroes fight Lü Bu	破虎牢三英战吕布
6	Sun Jian gains the Imperial Jade Seal	孙坚得传国玉玺
7	Sun Jian's death at Sanjin Ford	三津渡孙文台殒命
8	Wang Yun plans the Chain-Linked Strategy	王司徒巧设连环计
9	Father and son turn hostile at Fengyi Pavilion	凤仪亭父子挑兵戈
10	Lü Bu kills Dong Zhuo	反间计吕布诛董卓
11	Tao Qian offers Xu Province thrice	陶恭祖三让徐州城
12	Lü Bu is defeated in battle and seeks shelter under Liu Bei	吕奉先战败投刘备
13	Cao Cao saves the emperor and controls the warlords	曹孟德救驾令诸侯
14	Lü Bu stages a night raid on Xu Province	吕奉先趁夜袭徐郡
15	Lü Bu shoots an arrow through a halberd	吕奉先辕门射画戟
16	Cao Cao defeats Yuan Shu in battle	曹孟德举兵败袁术
17	Lü Bu falls for Cao Cao's trick and loses Xu Province	中曹计吕布失徐州
18	Lü Bu meets his end at White Gate Tower	白门楼奉先赴黄泉
19	Liu Bei receives an imperial decree and swears to destroy Cao Cao	刘皇叔奉旨誓灭曹
20	Cao Cao discusses about heroes over drinks	曹孟德煮酒论英雄
21	Yuan Shao and Cao Cao mobilise their armies	袁曹各起马步三军
22	Liu Bei is defeated and seeks shelter under Yuan Shao	刘玄德战败投袁绍
23	Guan Yu surrenders to Cao Cao on three conditions	关云长降曹约三事
24	Yuan Shao loses troops and commanders	袁本初败兵又折将
25	Guan Yu's lone journey over a thousand li	美髯公千里走单骑
26	Reunion at Gucheng	会古城主臣聚大义
27	Yuan Shao suffers defeats at Guandu	战官渡袁本初败绩
28	Xu You betrays his lord and joins Cao Cao	许子远叛主投曹操
29	Cao Cao burns the supply depot at Wuchao	曹孟德劫粮烧乌巢
30	Liu Bei garrisons an army at Xinye	刘备屯兵新野
31	Liu Bei's horse leaps across the Tan Stream	刘皇叔跃马过檀溪
32	Xu Shu turns back to recommend Zhuge Liang to Liu Bei	徐元直走马荐诸葛
33	Liu Bei visits Zhuge Liang thrice	刘玄德三顾请诸葛
34	Sun Ce passes on his legacy to Sun Quan	孙策传位孙权
35	Zhuge Liang deploys troops at an early stage	诸葛亮初用兵
36	Zhao Yun fights at Changban	赵子龙血战长坂坡
37	Zhuge Liang argues with the scholars	诸葛孔明舌战群儒
38	Zhuge Liang instigates Zhou Yu to resist Cao Cao	抗曹操孔明激周瑜
39	Jiang Gan steals a letter after a ceremony	群英会蒋子翼盗书
40	Zhuge Liang borrows arrows with straw boats	诸葛孔明草船借箭
41	Zhou Yu defeats Cao Cao at Red Cliff	周公瑾赤壁破曹操
42	Guan Yu spares Cao Cao at Huarong Trail	关云长华容放曹操
43	Sima Yi serves Cao Cao	司马懿出山助曹操
44	Cao Cao scares away Ma Teng of Western Liang	曹操吓退西凉马腾
45	Cao Cao loses his beloved son Cao Chong	曹操痛失爱子曹冲
46	Zhou Yu prepares to attack Jing Province	夺荆州周公瑾发兵
47	The forces of Cao, Sun and Liu battle for Nan Commandery	曹孙刘三军战南郡
48	Zhou Yu returns to Chaisang in unhappiness	周公瑾赌气归柴桑
49	Zhao Yun captures Guiyang	赵子龙计取桂阳城
50	Guan Yu fights at Changsha and recruits Huang Zhong and Wei Yan	战长沙关羽收黄魏
51	Lu Su comes twice to ask for Jing Province	鲁子敬二度索荆州
52	Liu Bei travels to Wu for a marriage	刘备赴吴娶亲
53	Sun Quan is angered by Zhou Yu	孙权被周瑜激怒
54	Lady Sun and Liu Bei are wed	孙小妹刘备成亲
55	Liu Bei returns to Jing Province	刘备智返荆州
56	Zhuge Liang infuriates Zhou Yu thrice	诸葛亮三气周瑜
57	Zhou Yu is defeated and dies with regret	周瑜兵败抱憾而亡
58	Zhuge Liang mourns Zhou Yu	诸葛亮痛哭祭周瑜
59	Cao Cao hosts a banquet at the Bronze Sparrow Platform	曹操大宴铜雀台
60	Ma Teng enters the capital	西凉统领马腾进京
61	Ma Teng is killed after falling into an ambush	马腾中埋伏被杀
62	Xu Chu fights Ma Chao	许褚斗马超
63	Zhang Song is humiliated but is later well received by Liu Bei	张松受辱刘备相迎
64	Zhang Song presents a map; Liu Bei enters southwest China	张松献图玄德入川
65	Wei Yan performs a sword dance, his target is Liu Zhang	魏延舞剑意在刘璋
66	Pang Tong's demise at Fallen Phoenix Slope	庞统身死落凤坡
67	Ma Chao pledges allegiance to Liu Bei	马超誓效刘皇叔
68	Guan Yu attends a feast alone and armed with only a blade	关云长单刀赴会
69	Huang Zhong conquers Hanzhong	黄忠攻破汉中
70	Cao Cao executes Yang Xiu at Mount Dingjun	定军山曹操杀杨修
71	Guan Yu's poison arrow wound is cured	关羽刮骨疗毒
72	Guan Yu commits suicide at Maicheng	关羽麦城悲壮自刎
73	Cao Cao's final wish and death	传遗命曹操气数终
74	Cao Pi forces Cao Zhi to compose the Seven Steps Poem	兄逼弟曹植七步诗
75	Emperor Xian receives two imperial edicts and abdicates in Cao Pi's favour	汉献帝两诏禅曹丕
76	Emperor Xian commits suicide; Liu Bei establishes Shu	献帝自杀刘备建蜀
77	Zhang Fei dies in his eagerness to avenge his brother	急兄仇张翼德殒命
78	Liu Bei launches a campaign against Eastern Wu	刘玄德兴兵征东吴
79	Sun Quan submits to Wei	孙权降魏
80	Huang Zhong is killed in battle	黄忠战死
81	Lu Xun sets aflame Liu Bei's linked camps over 700 li	陆伯言营烧七百里
82	Liu Bei entrusts his son at Baidicheng	刘先主白帝城托孤
83	Zhuge Liang calmly holds off five enemy forces	诸葛亮安居平五路
84	Zhuge Liang writes the Chu Shi Biao	诸葛拟出师表
85	Zhuge Liang prepares for the Northern Campaigns	诸葛亮北伐大兴师
86	Ma Su refuses to accept advice and loses Jieting	马幼常拒谏失街亭
87	Zhuge Liang's Empty Fort Strategy backs off Sima Yi's troops	诸葛孔明空城退敌
88	Zhao Yun bids the world farewell	赵云辞世
89	Zhuge Liang defeats Sima Yi	诸葛亮大破司马懿
90	Zhuge Liang eliminates Cao Zhen with a wise plan	诸葛亮妙计除曹真
91	Zhuge Liang takes Chencang by strategy	诸葛亮计破陈仓城
92	Zhuge Liang sends a letter to ridicule Sima Yi	诸葛孔明下书辱司马
93	Sima Yi is saved by a downpour at Shangfang Valley	上方谷大雨救司马
94	The chancellor's death at Wuzhang Plains	五丈原汉丞相归天
95	Sima Yi fakes illness and takes control of Wei	司马懿诈病掌朝政

== Cast ==
=== Main cast ===
- Chen Jianbin as Cao Cao
- Yu Hewei as Liu Bei
- Lu Yi as Zhuge Liang
- Yu Rongguang as Guan Yu
- Kang Kai as Zhang Fei
- Nie Yuan as Zhao Yun
- Ni Dahong as Sima Yi
- Yu Bin as Cao Pi
- Luo Jin as Liu Xie (Emperor Xian)
  - Xiaodingge as Liu Xie (child)
- Lü Xiaohe as Dong Zhuo
- Peter Ho as Lü Bu
- Chen Hao as Diaochan
- Zhang Bo as Sun Quan
  - Zheng Wei as Sun Quan (child)
- Ruby Lin as Lady Sun
- Victor Huang as Zhou Yu
- Sha Yi as Sun Ce
- Liu Jing as Daqiao
- Zhao Ke as Xiaoqiao

=== Supporting cast ===
- Li Li as Bao Long
- Bai Yu as Lady Bian
- Cao Xiwen as Lady Cai (Liu Biao's wife)
- Li Fangyao as Cai He
- Liu Dan as Cai Mao
- Hu Zi as Cai Yang
- Guo Miaoxin as Cai Zhong
- Liu Zijiao as Empress Cao
- Zhao Lei as Cao Bao
- An-Peng Zeyu as Cao Chong
- Li Daiqing as Cao Hong
- Yuan Shaoxiong as Cao Fang
- Yang Guang as Cao Ren
- Yang Demin as Cao Rui
- Xia Tian as Cao Shuang
- Guo Jiyun as Cao Song
- Li Gen as Cao Zhang
- Zhao Jin as Cao Zhen
- Li Jichun as Cao Zhi
- Wang Jinjun as Cheng Dekou
- Shang Yue as Chen Deng
- Sun Hongtao as Chen Gong
- Lu Jidong as Chen Gui
- Sun Hai as Chen Qun
- Ding Xiaonan as Chen Ying
- Zhong Minghe as Cheng Pu
- Jiang Changyi as Cheng Yu
- Cao Zhanjun as Cui Zhouping
- Jiang Yi as Ding Feng
- Bai Hui as Consort Dong
- Gao Baosong as Dong Cheng
- Yang Chuanxi as Dong Zhao
- Zhang Xinhua as Fa Zheng
- Piao Lan as Lady Fan
- Dong Zhiyong as Fan Qiang
- Wang Daosheng as Fu Jun
- Tang Zidi as Lady Gan
- Xia Xiaolong as Gan Ning
- Chen Gang as Gao Xiang
- Wang Baogang as Gongsun Zan
- Fan Jinlun as Guan Ping
- Wei Zhi as Guan Xing
- Wang Di as Empress Guo
- Zhang Ge as Guo Huai
- Wang Jinxin as Guo Jia
- Gong Zhixi as Guo Si
- Han Zhenguo as Guo Tu
- Liu Jun as Han Dang
- Jiao Zhiqiang as Han Fu
- Hu Sha as Han Sui
- Ying Qiang as Han Xuan
- Qin Fanxiang as Hao Zhao
- Cai Jun as Hua Tuo
- Zhang Xiqian as Hua Xin
- Ding Xiaonan as Hua Xiong
- Liu Kui as Huang Gai
- Zhao Xu as Huang Kui
- Sun Wanqing as Huang Quan
- Song Laiyun as Huang Zhong
- Ren Xuehai as Ji Ping
- Chen Fusheng as Ji Ling
- Liao Weili as Jia Hua
- Li Muge as Jiang Gan
- Ye Peng as Jiang Wei
- Li Yixiao as Jingshu
- Bai Hailong as Kong Xiu
- Er Hou as Kong You
- Cao Guoxin as Li Dian
- Ge Youyuan as Li Feng
- Sen Zhixue as Li Jue
- Song Chongdong as Li Ru
- Deng Liming as Li Yan
- Ji Chenggong as Liu Biao
- Qiu Shuang as Liu Cong
- Xu Xiao as Liu Dai
- Wang Shigui as Liu Du
- Fan Guan as Liu Qi
- Wang Peng as Liu Shan
- Yang Tong as Liu Xian
- Li Yuemin as Liu Zhang
- Jia Xiang as Lu Ji
- Huo Qing as Lu Su
- Shao Feng as Lu Xun
- Zhao Bingkui as Lü Boshe
- Jerry Chang Lu Feng as Lü Meng
- Chen Yilin as Ma Chao
- Xia Tian as Ma Dai
- Guan Ziqian as Ma Liang
- Zheng Shiming as Ma Su
- Ning Sheng as Ma Teng
- Shang Yisha as Lady Mi
- Hong Pangzi as Mi Fang
- Wu Qiong as Miao Ze
- Da Lin as Niu Jin
- Han Lei as Pan Zhang
- Tian Xiang as Pang De
- Chen Houxing as Pang Ji
- Du Xudong as Pang Tong
- Fan Shide as Pujing
- Xue Xiaolong as Two Qiaos' father
- Pu Youwei as Qin Lang
- Ding Dong as Qin Qingtong
- Dai Qiwen as Shen Yi
- Wang Shijun as Sima Hui
- Zhao Dacheng as Sima Shi
- Miao Yaning as Sima Yan
- Liu Guoguang as Sima Zhao
- Ji Aojun as Sun Huan
- Fan Yulin as Sun Jian
- Li Yatian as Sun Li
- Yang Rui as Sun Qian
- Zhao Xuan as Tao Gongyi
- Tong Han as Tao Qian
- Xu Tao as Tian Feng
- Liu Bingyu as Wang Lang
- Wang Huan as Wang Ping
- Zheng Tianyong as Wang Yun
- Wang Xinjun as Wei Yan
- Wang Mengchuan as Wen Chou
- Kang Qunzhi as Lady Wu
- Wang Maolei as Wu Zhi
- Hu Chunyong as Xiahou Ba
- Li Mengcheng as Xiahou Dun
- Li Qilong as Xiahou Yuan
- Liu Ganhan as Xiang Jun
- Wang Wentao as Xing Daorong
- Guo Tao as Xu Chu
- Chen Wei as Xu Huang
- Sun Yan as Xu Sheng
- Yao Gang as Xu Shu
- Hai Yan as Xu Shu's mother
- Xu Maomao as Xu You
- Yang Rui as Xue Zong
- Shao Yueheng as Xun An
- Li Jianxin as Xun Yu
- Zhang Qifu as Yan Jun
- Li Xu as Yan Liang
- Li Xu as Yan Yan
- Li Xiaowei as Yang Ling
- Lu Dongfu as Yang Song
- Jin Yi as Yang Xiu
- Chen Shanshan as Yang Yi
- Qi Huai as Yu Fan
- Wu Kegang as Yu Jin
- Han Wenliang as Yuan Shang
- Xu Wenguang as Yuan Shao
- Yan Pei as Yuan Shu
- Liu Long as Yuan Tan
- Lan Tian as Yuan Xi
- Bu Sisi as Yunying
- Cai Jin as Zhang Bao
- Tan Jianchang as Zhang He
- Cheng Xiangyin as Zhang Liao
- Li Daguang as Zhang Lu
- Lu Lu as Zhang Ren
- Liu Yajin as Zhang Song
- Chen Xinhua as Zhang Su
- Chen Bing as Zhang Wen
- Zhao Qiusheng as Zhang Yi
- Shen Jie as Zhang Zhao
- Wang Guogang as Zhao Fan
- Li Hua as Zhong Yao
- Zhang Jiaoyang as Zhou Cang
- Zhao Shuijing as Zhou Shan
- Hou Jie as Zhou Tai
- Zhu Lei as Zhu Ran
- Cao Yi as Zhuge Jin
- Ru Xiaobin as Zhuge Jun
- Chao Fan as Zu Mao

=== Replaced cast ===
Jiang Wen was originally cast as Cao Cao but he abandoned the role after two directors quit the project; he eventually portrayed Cao Cao in the 2011 film The Lost Bladesman. Soon afterwards, Tang Guoqiang, who previously portrayed Zhuge Liang in Romance of the Three Kingdoms (1994), asked for the role, but it had already been reassigned to Chen Jianbin by then.

Ken Watanabe asked director Gao Xixi for the role of Guan Yu. Gao reportedly was unable to meet Watanabe's request for a salary of 30–40 million yuan, and was forced to turn him away. The role eventually went to Yu Rongguang, who had previously appeared as Han De in the 2008 film Three Kingdoms: Resurrection of the Dragon.

== Critical reception ==
The series was a commercial success in China and dominated ratings, but has received a mixed reception and caused controversy among critics and fans, with many commenting that the series deviated significantly not only from Romance of the Three Kingdoms but also historical records. The series was criticised for prioritising commercial entertainment over research and understanding of the novel and history, and creating plot holes in its reinterpretation. While some publications praised the producers' willingness to rewrite the events of the novel and reinterpret familiar characters, others criticise the writing and editing for being sluggish, superfluous and puerile, questioning some of the character and story reinterpretations, and using clichés from other Chinese gongdou (inner palace intrigue) and romantic soap dramas to be eye-catching while losing the solemnity and dignity of the original source material.

== Soundtrack ==
#	Track title	Credits	Notes
1	还我一个太平天下 (pinyin: Huán Wǒ Yī Gè Tài Píng Tiān Xià) (translation: Give Me Back A World At Peace)	Composed by Zhao Jiping; lyrics by Yi Ming; performed by Liao Changyong	Opening theme song
2	英雄往来天地间 (pinyin: Yīng Xióng Wǎng Lái Tiān Dì Jiān) (translation: Heroes Cross Heaven And Earth)	Composed by Zhao Jiping; lyrics by Yi Ming; performed by Tan Jing	Ending theme song
3	天地莽苍苍 (pinyin: Tiān Dì Mǎng Cāng Cāng) (translation: A Blurry World)	Composed by Zhao Jiping; lyrics by Yi Ming; performed by Tang Can	Ending theme song
4	貂婵歌 (pinyin: Diāo Chán Gē) (translation: Diaochan's Song)	Composed by Zhao Jiping; lyrics by Luo Guanzhong; performed by Chen Hao	
5	爱无痕 (pinyin: Ài Wú Hén) (translation: Love Without A Trace)	Composed by Hu Li; lyrics by Shi Donghui and Hu Li; performed by Deng Tianqing	
6	不枉 (pinyin: Bù Wǎng) (translation: Not in Vain)	Composed by Tang Chi-wai; lyrics by Sandy Chang; performed by Super 4	Opening theme song (Hong Kong version)

== Awards ==
Year	Award	Category	Recipient	Ref.
2010	Shanghai Television Festival	Best Television Series (Silver Award)	Three Kingdoms	
2010	China TV Drama Awards	Best Television Series	Three Kingdoms	
2010	China TV Drama Awards	Most Popular Television Series	Three Kingdoms	
2010	China TV Drama Awards	Best Director	Gao Xixi	
2010	China TV Drama Awards	Best Screenwriter	Zhu Sujin	
2010	China TV Drama Awards	Television Figure of the Year	Chen Jianbin	
2011	Seoul International Drama Awards	Grand Prize	Three Kingdoms	
2011	Seoul International Drama Awards	Best Actor	Chen Jianbin	
2011	International Drama Festival in Tokyo	Special Award for Foreign Drama	Three Kingdoms	
2011	45th Houston International Film Festival	Grand Remi Award	Three Kingdoms	

== International broadcast ==
Region	Network	Dates	Timings
Mainland China	Anhui TV	2 May 2010 – 14 June 2010	19:35 daily
Mainland China	Jiangsu TV	2 May 2010 – 14 June 2010	19:30 daily
Mainland China	Chongqing TV	2 May 2010 – 14 June 2010	19:36 daily
Mainland China	Tianjin TV	2 May 2010 – 14 June 2010	19:35 daily
Hong Kong	TVB Select	11 October 2010 – 4 March 2011	22:30–23:30 from Monday–Thursday; Monday–Friday from 13 December onwards
Japan	BS Fuji	26 October 2010 – 2011	Weekly on Mondays from 21:00 to 23:00
Malaysia	Astro Zhi Zun HD	10 November 2010 – 2011	18:00–19:00 on weekdays
Hong Kong	HD Jade	15 March 2012 – 11 July 2012	23:45–00:45 on weekdays
Taiwan	China Television	2 July 2012 – 4 September 2012	
South Korea	KBS 2TV	27 February 2012 – 12 February 2013	00:35–01:25 from Monday–Tuesday
Romania	On national television channels: TVR2 & TVR HD (simultaneously); TVR3	first broadcast, on TVR 2 and TVR HD: 16 May 2011 second broadcast, on TVR 3: 2012 third broadcast, on TVR 2 and TVR HD: August 2013 – 12 December 2013	20:00 and 00:50 (R), from Monday to Thursday 23:00 and 04:30 (R), from Monday to Saturday 23:50–01:20 (may vary) and 4:00–4:50 (R) from Wednesday to Friday (may vary)
Thailand	3 HD, 3 Family	30 January 2017 (Originally broadcast: 25 October 2016)	18:20–19:05 from Monday-Thursday; 18:00–18:45 on Friday (since 1 May 2017, it moved to broadcast on 3 Family at 21:00)
Middle East & North Africa	MBC Action	24 April 2016 – 15 November 2016	17:00 on weekdays
Iran	IRIB Tamasha		19:00 on weekdays

== See also ==
- Romance of the Three Kingdoms (TV series)
- List of media adaptations of Romance of the Three Kingdoms
