= The Legendary Prime Minister – Zhuge Liang =

- Poster

Chinese name
- Traditional Chinese: 諸葛亮
- Simplified Chinese: 诸葛亮
- Literal meaning: Zhuge Liang
Transcriptions
Standard Mandarin
- Hanyu Pinyin: Zhūgě Liàng
Yue: Cantonese
- Jyutping: Zyu1-got3 Loeng6
- Genre: Historical drama, wuxia
- Written by: Mak Sau-yee; Cheng Gam-fuk; Cho Wai-leung; Tam Wai-sing; Poon Kin-gung; Yu Hon-wing
- Directed by: Lee Lik-chi; Tang Chi-kit; Leung Heung-lan; Leung Chi-kin; Keung Ming-hoi; Tam Bei-tak
- Starring: Adam Cheng; Michelle Yim
- Opening theme: Bat Tsan To (八陣圖) performed by Adam Cheng
- Composers: Tang Siu-lam; Ng wai-nin
- Country of origin: Hong Kong
- Original language: Cantonese
- No. of episodes: 40

Production
- Producer: Lau Ka-ho
- Production location: Hong Kong
- Cinematography: Chan Gam-chuen; Wong Tit; Chiu Wing-sing; Ko Hei
- Editor: Yuen Siu-si
- Running time: 45 minutes per episode
- Production company: ATV

Original release
- Network: ATV
- Release: 9 December 1985

The Legendary Prime Minister – Zhuge Liang is a Hong Kong television series based on the life of Zhuge Liang (Cantonese: Chu-kot Leung), a chancellor (or prime minister) of the state of Shu Han in the Three Kingdoms period. Starring Adam Cheng as the title character, the series not only incorporates stories about Zhuge Liang from the 14th-century historical novel Romance of the Three Kingdoms, but also includes some elements of wuxia and a fictional romance between Zhuge Liang and Xiaoqiao (Cantonese: Siu-kiu). The series was produced by ATV and first started airing in Hong Kong on 9 December 1985.

== Plot ==
General Liu has 2 sons Liu Qi and Liu Zhong. Both sons are fine in war strategy, except that Qi is kind while Zhong is evil. Qi saves a beautiful maid, Zhi Lan. He likes her but his brother rapes her. Later Zhong ditches her. Qi gets worried when Zhi Lan has Zhong's child and disappears. Knowing that his brother is the scheming type, he gives everything up and tries to look for her with Liang. They finally find her. Zhi Lan is touched by Qi's love for her and finally marries him. Liang envies them and wonders when he will get to be with his love one day. Liu Bei seeks his help 3 times before he agrees to help him out. On his way to the camp, he meets Xiao Qiao who is beautiful and also intelligent. Both are interested in one another but Liang is disappointed to know that she is engaged to another general, Zhou Yu. Zhou Yu is angry to know that his fiancée has a change of heart and he demands to carry their wedding forward. Xiao Qiao seeks help from Liang but he ignores her. Zhou Yu is close on their heels. Out of desperation, she jumps off the cliff. Both men are alarmed upon seeing this. Liang tries to hold her hand but tears her sleeve instead. He also injures himself when both reach the bottom of the cliff. He tries to crawl close to the unconscious Xiao Qiao but Zhou Yu kicks him aside and carries her home. Xiao Qiao is sent to Huang Ying's father for treatment. Zhou Yu never leaves her alone as Xiao Qiao may die any second. Huang Ying, however, pities Liang who stands outside the hut daily to check on Xiao Qiao's condition. She starts to fall for him. Zhou Yu marries Xiao Qiao after her recovery. She is unhappy and Zhou Yu treats her coldly although he really loves her. Liang also marries Ying but he sets his mind to put his heart in his work to manage his master's state to help his son. He gets along well with Kwan Yu and Zhang Fei. He thinks of very good war strategies to control the other states. Being a martial arts expert himself (can you believe it?), he is also a master of traps. He finds Qi but Qi declines to help as he is happy to settle in a village with his family and son. In the meantime, Zhong joins Cao Cao's army. The Wei state thus becomes the strongest among the three. Zhou Yu and Liang often see each other and they often have verbal attacks. Cao Cao is glad to see this and he plans to grab the other 2 states when he gets the chance. After all these years, the other people have aged, except for Xiao Qiao. Why? To save her life, Ying's father has to give her a valuable drug that keeps her youth all along. Ying is amazed to see how Xiao Qiao remains the same all these years while she ages so much. She can see how much Liang still loves her and feels inferior of herself. She finally dies miserably, urging Liang not to give Xiao Qiao up. Zhou Yu helps his master, Sun Quan, after the elder ruler Sun Che dies. Being younger and inexperienced, he always listens to Zhou Yu's advice. Liang also helps Liu Bei's son, Ah Dou, who is a stupid man. He ages so much as he takes charge of everything in the war after his masters' death. Zhou Yu fails in several attempts to seize Liu Bei's state. He is seriously injured in an attack. However, he is very upset that Xiao Qiao doesn't say that she likes him all these years. Even though she takes care of him, she doesn't say these words even till the day of his death. Cao Cao also becomes an unhappy man after he causes his favourite son, Cao Zhi's death. Cao Pi throws discord among them and he is remorseful over it. He starts to wonder the point of having wars and stops. Liang and Xiao Qiao are finally together. But Liang is dying too as he reveals too many predicted secrets. Xiao Qiao is upset but they decide to spend the remaining days happily together.

== Cast ==
Note: Some of the characters' names are in Cantonese romanisation.

- Adam Cheng as Chu-kot Leung
- Michelle Yim as Siu-kiu
- Yip Yuk-ping as Wong Ying
- Hung Tak-sing as Lau Bei
- Cheng Lui as Kwan Yu
- Choi Kwok-hing as Cheung Fei
- Tong Chun-chung as Chiu Wan
- Wong Wai as Cho Cho
- Tong Pan-cheung as Cho Pei
- Kam Tung as Sze-ma Yi
- Wai Lit as Suen Tsak
- Ng Si-tak as Suen Kuen
- Law Lok-lam as Chow Yu
- Chan Choi-yin as Dai-kiu
- Szema Wah Lung as Lau Biu
- Kenny Ho as Lau Kei
- Yeung Chung-yan as Lau Tsung
- Ling Man-hoi as Chu-kot Yuen
- Kwan Tze-biu as Chu-kot Gan
- Pau Hon-lam as Wong Sing-yin
- Cho Tat-wah as Pong Tak-gung
- Lee Hang as Lou Suk
- Kam San as Lui Mung
- Cheng Wai-lun as Luk Sun
- Tong Kam-tong as Ngai Yin
- Cheng Shu-fung as Cheung Liu
- Chan Leung as Sing Yuk
- Leung Ming as Cheung Bo
- Law Shek-ching as Mang Wok
- Ben Ng as Lee Din
- Au Hoi-ling as Lee Tze-lan
- Tsang Wai-kuen as Pong Tung
- Cheung Tin-wai as Liu Fa
- Ling Fei-lik as Chow Chong
- Yeung Tak-si / Lee Ka-ho as Keung Wai
- Ngo Lung as Wah To
- Eric Wan as Fan Or
- Ng Wing-sam as Choi Mo
- Tam Siu-mei as Lady Choi
- Berg Ng as Shek Kwong-yuen
- Hui Ying-sau as Elder Kiu
- Chan Mei-yee as Lady Kam
- Lau Suk-fong as Lady Mei
- Kwan Ka-lai as Kwan Yu's wife
- Yau Pui-ling as Cheung Fei's wife
- Tam Tak-sing as Hon Hin Dai
- Tang Pik-yuk as Consort Tung
- Ng Wui as Yuen-kei To-yan
- Kong To as Bak-duk San-mo
- Fan Wing-wah as East Cave Master
- Chan Lai-yau as South Cave Master
- Keung Wai-kwong as West Cave Master
- Tsang Tsan-on as North Cave Master
- Fong Kwok-san as Nanman woman

== See also ==
- Zhuge Liang (TV series)
- List of media adaptations of Romance of the Three Kingdoms
