= Lady Cai (Eastern Han) =

2nd/3rd century Chinese noblewoman and wife of Eastern Han warlord Liu Biao

Lady Cai 蔡夫人

Personal details
- Spouse: Liu Biao
- Relations: Cai Mao (brother); Huang Yueying (niece); Huang Chengyan's wife (sister); Zhang Wen's wife (aunt)
- Children: Liu Cong (step-son)
- Occupation: Aristocrat

Lady Cai (蔡夫人; fl.190-208) was a Chinese noble woman member of the Cai family of Nan Commandery during the Eastern Han. She was the later wife of Liu Biao, the Governor of Jing province, and a sister to Cai Mao, a prominent general in Liu Biao's service. Sources differ on whether she was Cai Mao's elder or younger sister.

She is best known for her unwavering commitment to favoring Liu Cong over Liu Qi in the competition for the governorship of Jing Province; This event ultimately paved the way for the succession of Liu Bei as the governor of Jing, the warlord who went on to establish the state of Shu Han, one of the three prominent states that emerged during the Three Kingdoms period (220-280 AD).

== Early life ==
Lady Cai came from the elite Cai family in Xiangyang, Nan Commandery, the capital of Jing Province (covering present-day Hubei and Hunan). Her father was Cai Feng (蔡諷). His aunt (Cai Feng's sister) married Zhang Wen, who served as the Grand Commandant (太尉) during the reign of Emperor Ling. Lady Cai had a sister who married Huang Chengyan, and a brother, Cai Mao. It's worth noting that Lady Cai's niece, Huang Yueying, was married to Zhuge Liang, a famous strategist who later become chancellor of Shu Han state. Lady Cai also had two other notable relatives: Cai Zan (蔡瓚), courtesy name Maogui (茂珪), who served as the Chancellor of Mei (郿相); and Cai Yan (蔡琰), (Note: Not to be confused with Cai Wenji, who is also known as Cai Yan.) courtesy name Wengui (文珪), who served as the Administrator of Ba Commandery (巴郡太守). The Cai family would later be robbed and massacred by bandits during the Yongjia era (307–313) of the reign of Emperor Huai of the Jin dynasty (266–420).

During the conflict between Cao Cao and Yuan Shao at the Battle of Guandu, Han Song, an advisor to Liu Biao, was sent as an envoy to Xuchang under Liu Biao's orders. However, upon seeing Cao Cao's overwhelming power, Han Song advised Liu Biao to send a hostage to the imperial court, which enraged Liu Biao. Consequently, he ordered Han Song's execution. Lady Cai, recognizing Han Song's loyalty and integrity, spoke in his favor, stating, "Han Song is a beacon of hope for Chu, and his words are honest. There is no reason to execute him." This led Liu Biao to change his decision and instead imprison Han Song.

== Conflict in Jing province ==
Lady Cai did not bear any children for Liu Biao. However, due to her niece's marriage to Liu Biao's son, Liu Cong, Lady Cai displayed a clear favoritism towards Liu Cong over Liu Biao's other son, Liu Qi. The Cai family faction, including members Cai Mao and Zhang Yun (張允), wielded significant influence within Liu Biao's administration. Their growing power led to mounting pressure on Liu Biao to designate Liu Cong as the heir to the governorship of Jing Province.

Lady Cai often spoke highly of Liu Cong while criticizing Liu Qi. Liu Qi willingly assumed the role of Administrator of Jiangxia, located about 250 km southeast of Jing Province's capital in Xiangyang. Sources differ on whether Liu Qi sought this position to escape family conflicts or was compelled to leave by the Cai family faction.

In 208, Liu Biao's severe illness prompted a visit from his son, Liu Qi, who had returned from Jiangxia Commandery. Concerned that Liu Biao might change his succession plans after meeting Liu Qi, Lady Cai, Cai Mao, and Liu Biao's maternal nephew, Zhang Yun, prevented Liu Qi from seeing his father.

Following the passing of Liu Biao, Liu Cong took up the role of Governor of Jing Province. Lady Cai's endeavors led to Liu Cong's appointment, but his rule in Jing Province was brief. Subsequent to Liu Biao's demise, several subordinates, including Liu Bei and his followers, chose to switch sides and joined Liu Qi in Xiakou. There, they formed an alliance with Sun Quan. Liu Qi perceived Liu Cong and the Cai family as potential rivals and considered launching an attack, but this prospect was thwarted by the arrival of Cao Cao's army.

=== Aftermath ===
Roughly a month later, Cao Cao, who controlled the Han central government and Emperor Xian, initiated an invasion of Jing Province. Advised by his councilors, Kuai Yue, Han Song, and Fu Xun, Liu Cong was urged to surrender to Cao Cao. Initially, Liu Cong harbored thoughts of resistance, but he eventually heeded the counsel of Fu Xun and abandoned the idea. When Cao Cao's forces reached Xiangyang, Liu Cong formally surrendered, resulting in his appointment as Inspector (刺史) of Qing Province and the conferral of the marquis title. Subsequently, at Cao Cao's recommendation, Liu Cong earned promotions to the esteemed positions of Counsellor Remonstrant (諫議大夫) and Army Adviser (參同軍事).

Later, following the Battle of Red Cliff, Liu Qi was appointed Inspector of Jing Province, partially fulfilling his father's role. After Liu Qi's demise, Liu Bei succeeded him as Governor of Jing Province, ascending to a higher rank.

== In Romance of the Three Kingdoms ==
In the novel Romance of the Three Kingdoms, Lady Cai posed as a potential adversary to Liu Bei during his time in Jing Province. Her determined efforts were focused on maintaining the unity of Jing Province, with her primary goal being to install her adopted son, Liu Cong, as the new prefect of Jing.

Lady Cai initially served as a concubine to Liu Biao. However, after the passing of Liu Biao's primary wife, Lady Chen, Lady Cai was elevated to the status of principal wife due to her role as the mother of Liu Cong. Later in the story, she conspired with Cai Mao to secure Liu Cong as the successor to Liu Biao, even plotting against Liu Qi and the guest general Liu Bei. These schemes ultimately ended in failure.

Following Liu Biao's death, Lady Cai and Liu Cong fabricated a fraudulent document to secure Liu Cong's appointment as governor. However, their deceitful scheme proved short-lived as word spread that Cao Cao's army was advancing towards Jing. Lady Cai overheard her son conferring with his advisors and urgently urged him to heed their counsel and surrender. Following a meeting with Cao Cao, she and Liu Cong were resettled in Qing Province in the northern regions of China. En route to their new destination, they met their demise at the hands of Yu Jin, who had been instructed by Cao Cao to carry out their assassination.

== Sources ==
- Chen, Shou (3rd century). Records of the Three Kingdoms (Sanguozhi).
- de Crespigny, Rafe (2007). A Biographical Dictionary of Later Han to the Three Kingdoms 23-220 AD. Leiden: Brill. ISBN 9789004156050.
- Pei, Songzhi (5th century). Annotated Records of the Three Kingdoms (Sanguozhi zhu).
