= Lady Cai =

Lady Cai may refer to:

- Cai Yan
- Lady Cai (Eastern Han) (蔡氏), second wife of Han dynasty provincial governor Liu Biao
