= Xu Shu =

3rd-century Chinese state of Cao Wei official

- 徐庶
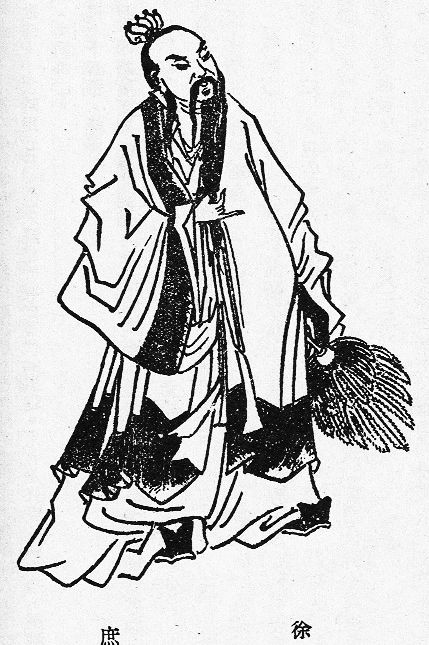
- A Qing dynasty illustration of Xu Shu

Palace Assistant Imperial Clerk (御史中丞)
- In office c. 220–?
- Monarch: Cao Pi

Right General of the Household (右中郎將)
- In office c. 220–?
- Monarch: Cao Pi

Personal details
- Born: c.170s Henan
- Died: c.early 230s
- Occupation: Politician
- Courtesy name: Yuanzhi (元直)
- Original name: Xu Fu (徐福)

Xu Shu (fl.180 – 230s), courtesy name Yuanzhi, originally named Xu Fu, was a Chinese politician of the state of Cao Wei during the Three Kingdoms period of China. He was born in the late Eastern Han dynasty and used to be a vigilante swordsman in his early life. However, after running into trouble with the authorities, he renounced his old ways and took up scholarly pursuits. He lived a reclusive life from the 190s to mid-200s in Jing Province (covering present-day Hubei and Hunan provinces), where he met and befriended Zhuge Liang. In late 207, he became an adviser to the warlord Liu Bei and served under Liu for about a year. He also recommended Zhuge Liang to Liu Bei during this period of time. In late 208, Liu Bei was defeated at the Battle of Changban by his rival Cao Cao. Xu Shu's mother was captured by Cao Cao's forces during the battle. Feeling lost and without a sense of direction, Xu Shu eventually left Liu Bei and joined Cao Cao. He continued serving in the state of Cao Wei – founded by Cao Cao's son and successor, Cao Pi, who ended the Eastern Han dynasty – and died of illness in office.

Xu Shu's defection from Liu Bei to Cao Cao was fictionalised in the historical novel Romance of the Three Kingdoms. In the novel, he was Liu Bei's chief strategist before Zhuge Liang came along, and he once helped Liu Bei repel two attacks from Cao Cao's general Cao Ren. He was eventually tricked into leaving Liu Bei and joining Cao Cao, but he recommended Zhuge Liang to Liu Bei before leaving and swore never to give advice to Cao Cao.

== Early life ==
Xu Shu was from Yingchuan Commandery (潁川郡), Yu Province, which is in present-day central Henan. His original given name was Fu (福), and he was born into a poor family. He was a swordsman in his early life; during the latter part of the Zhong'ping era (184-189) of Emperor Ling's reign, he once helped someone take revenge by killing another person. To avoid being recognised, he covered his face with white chalk and let his hair run wild. He was later arrested by an official, who asked him for his name, but he did not reply. The official tied him to a cart, paraded him through the streets, and asked for any person who could identify him. No one came forth. Xu Shu's fellows rescued him later. He was so grateful to be saved that he gave up his life as a swordsman and became a scholar.

When Xu Shu first attended school, his mates ostracised him because of his background, but he remained humble and hardworking. He woke up early, cleaned the school alone, and paid great attention to his studies. He met Shi Tao (石韜; also known as Shi Guangyuan 石廣元) and became close friends with him. In the early 190s, when wars broke out in central China, Xu Shu and Shi Tao moved south to Jing Province (covering present-day Hubei and Hunan), where they met Zhuge Liang and befriended him. During his time in Jing Province from the late 190s to the early 200s (about a decade), Xu Shu maintained close friendships with Zhuge Liang, Shi Tao and Meng Gongwei (孟公威). They travelled and studied together. Xu Shu was also close and friendly with Xiang Lang.

== Serving Liu Bei ==
When the warlord Liu Bei was stationed at Xinye County, Xu Shu visited him and received a warm reception. Xu Shu recommended Zhuge Liang as an adviser to Liu Bei and told him that he must visit Zhuge Liang in person (i.e., he cannot invite Zhuge Liang to visit him). Zhuge Liang later came to serve Liu Bei after the latter visited him thrice and consulted him on the affairs of their time.

In 208, Liu Biao, the Governor of Jing Province, died and was succeeded by his younger son, Liu Cong. Later that year, when the warlord Cao Cao invaded Jing Province, Liu Cong surrendered and much of northern Jing Province came under Cao Cao's control. Liu Bei led his forces and a large number of civilians south to Xiakou (夏口; in present-day Wuhan, Hubei), which was independent of Cao Cao's control and where Liu Biao's elder son, Liu Qi, was based. Xu Shu accompanied Liu Bei on his journey towards Xiakou. Cao Cao sent 5,000 riders to pursue Liu Bei. They caught up with him and defeated him at the Battle of Changban. Cao Cao's men captured Xu Shu's mother during the battle, so Xu Shu decided to leave Liu Bei to reunite with his mother. Before leaving, he pointed at his heart and told Liu Bei, "I wanted to join you, General, in making great achievements. This is my purpose in life. Now that I've lost my mother, I've also lost my sense of direction. This isn't going to be helpful. Now I bid farewell to you." He went to join Cao Cao. Shi Tao also followed him and both of them came to serve Cao Cao.

== Service in Cao Wei ==
Xu Shu continued serving in the state of Cao Wei – founded by Cao Cao's son and successor, Cao Pi – after the fall of the Han dynasty and the start of the Three Kingdoms period. During Cao Pi's reign from December 220 to June 226, Xu Shu served as a Right General of the Household (右中郎將) and a Palace Assistant Imperial Clerk (御史中丞).

During the Taihe era (227-233) of Cao Rui's (Cao Pi's successor) reign, Zhuge Liang – who was then the chancellor-regent of the state of Shu Han, which Liu Bei founded in 221 – led a series of campaigns to attack the state of Cao Wei. When Zhuge Liang heard about the ranks of Xu Shu and Shi Tao in Wei, he remarked, "Are there so many talents in Wei? Why aren't the talents of these two men put to good use?" Xu Shu died of illness in Wei several years later. A tombstone with his name on it was found in Pengcheng (present-day Xuzhou, Jiangsu).

== In Romance of the Three Kingdoms ==
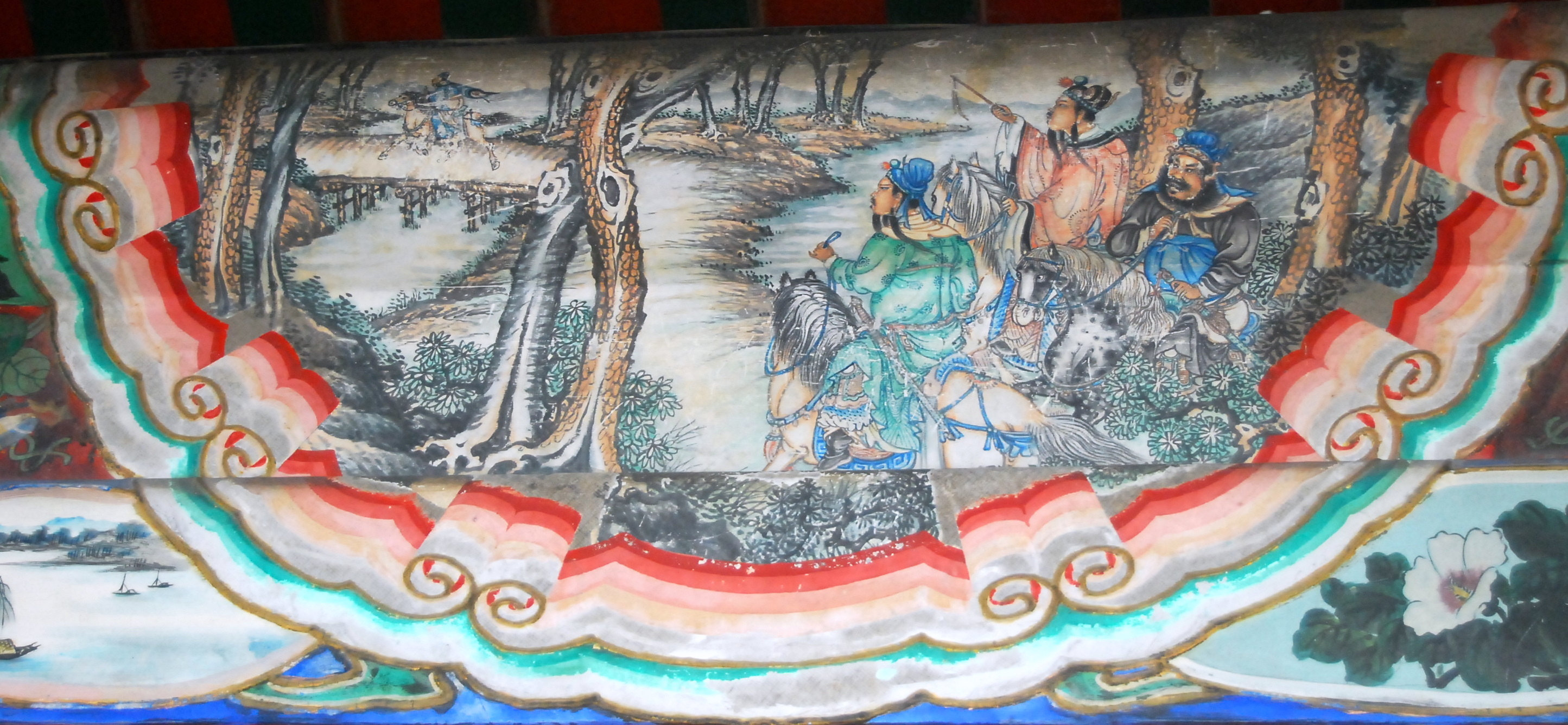
An illustration "Xu Shu recommends Zhuge (Liang) while on horseback" (走馬薦諸葛) at the Long Corridor of the Summer Palace, Beijing.

Xu Shu is featured as a fairly prominent character in the historical novel Romance of the Three Kingdoms, which romanticises the historical events before and during the Three Kingdoms period. He appeared mainly in chapters 35–36, in which he served as Liu Bei's strategist before Zhuge Liang came along. In the novel, his original name was Shan Fu (單福), perhaps due to a misreading of the phrase "本單家子" in the Weilue. The phrase could be read as him being a son of the Shan family, but in this context, it actually meant that he was a son of a poor family.

Xu Shu was singing on the streets of Xinye when Liu Bei noticed him and asked him if he was either the "Sleeping Dragon" or the "Fledgling Phoenix" that Sima Hui spoke of. However, Xu Shu told Liu Bei that he was neither of them. He agreed to become Liu Bei's strategist and helped Liu counter an invading army led by Cao Cao's general Cao Ren. Cao Ren deployed his troops in an "Eight Gates Golden Locks Formation" (八門金鎖陣) outside Xinye, but Xu Shu pointed out the weaknesses in the formation and instructed Liu's general Zhao Yun on how to break it. Zhao Yun led his men to attack the formation and succeeded in breaking it and defeating Cao Ren. Xu Shu also accurately predicted that Cao Ren would launch a surprise attack that night after his defeat. Liu Bei defeated Cao Ren again in the night battle and forced Cao Ren to retreat.

Cao Cao was impressed when he heard about Xu Shu and was eager to recruit Xu as an adviser. He invited Xu Shu's mother to meet him and asked her to write a letter to her son, requesting that her son come to join him. Xu Shu's mother refused, denounced Cao Cao as a treacherous villain, and threw an ink stone at him. The furious Cao Cao ordered Xu Shu's mother to be executed but changed his mind when Cheng Yu reminded him that Xu Shu would be more determined to help Liu Bei oppose him if he killed his mother. Cao Cao then had Xu Shu's mother detained and asked Cheng Yu to pretend to be Xu Shu's sworn brother to win the trust of Xu's mother. After some time, Cheng Yu got close to Xu Shu's mother and learnt to mimic her handwriting. He wrote a letter to Xu Shu in the handwriting of Xu's mother, telling Xu that she was in trouble and urging him to come to the imperial capital Xu (許; present-day Xuchang, Henan) quickly. Xu Shu was a filial son so he immediately left for Xu after reading the letter.

Xu Shu was in a hurry when he sped off on horseback. On the way, he suddenly remembered something and immediately turned back to meet Liu Bei and recommend Zhuge Liang to him. He then resumed his journey to Xu. When he arrived at his destination, he was shocked to discover that he had been tricked. His mother was furious with her son's failure to discern between truth and deception, and ashamed by the fact that her son joined Cao Cao instead of Liu Bei. She committed suicide. Xu Shu remained with Cao Cao, but he swore never to give advice to Cao.

The Chinese saying "His body is in (Cao) Cao's camp, but his heart is actually with the Han (dynasty)" (身在曹營心在漢; 身在曹营心在汉; shēn zài Cáo yíng xīn zài Hàn) is derived from this story about Xu Shu and another story about Guan Yu in Romance of the Three Kingdoms. It is used to describe a situation where a person who ostensibly works for a "bad" organisation is actually loyal towards another "good" organisation.

== In popular culture ==
Xu Shu is first introduced as a playable character in Dynasty Warriors 7: Empires of Koei's Dynasty Warriors video game series.

== See also ==
- Lists of people of the Three Kingdoms
