= Liu Yu, Prince of Lu =

Western Han Prince of Huaiyang (died 128 BC)

Liu Yu 劉餘

Prince of Huaiyang (淮陽王)
- Tenure: 155–154 BC

Prince of Lu (魯王)
- Tenure: 154–128 BC
- Born: Unknown
- Died: 128 BC
Names
- Family name: Liu (劉); Given name: Yu (餘)
- House: Han dynasty
- Father: Emperor Jing of Han
- Mother: Consort Cheng

Liu Yu (simplified Chinese: 刘馀; traditional Chinese: 劉餘; pinyin: Líu Yú; died 128 BC) was a prince of the Western Han dynasty. He was the fifth son of Emperor Jing. His mother was Consort Cheng (程妃). In 155 BC he was instated as Prince of Huaiyang (淮陽王), but a year later his title was later changed to Prince of Lu (魯王).

== Descendants ==
Liu Yu's descendants included the Three Kingdoms era warlords Liu Biao and Liu Yan, Liu Biao's sons Liu Qi and Liu Cong, and Liu Yan's son Liu Zhang.
