= Zhang Wen =

Zhang Wen may refer to:

- Zhang Wen (Han dynasty) (張溫, died 191), courtesy name Boshen (伯慎), Eastern Han dynasty politician
- Zhang Wen (Eastern Wu) (張溫, 193–230), courtesy name Huishu (惠恕), Eastern Wu politician in the Three Kingdoms period, see Records of the Three Kingdoms
- Zhang Wen (張溫), general in the army of the Ming dynasty
- Zhang Wen (張文), Ming official responsible for the fortification of Zhangjiakou, subsequently renamed in his honor
- Zhang Wen (badminton) (张稳, born 1992), Chinese badminton player

== See also ==
- Wen Zhang (born 1984), Chinese actor
