= Han Xuan =

3rd century Eastern Han dynasty official and warlord

- 韓玄

Administrator of Changsha (長沙太守)
- In office ?–?
- Monarch: Emperor Xian of Han
- Chancellor: Cao Cao (208–209)

Personal details
- Born: Unknown
- Died: Unknown
- Occupation: Official

Han Xuan (fl. 200s–210) was a government official who lived during the late Eastern Han dynasty of China. He served as the Administrator (太守) of Changsha Commandery (長沙郡; around present-day Changsha, Hunan). After Liu Biao's death in 208, the northern part of Jing Province was divided between two of Liu Biao's sons, Liu Qi and Liu Cong. The commanderies in southern Jing Province were ruled by their respective Administrators: Zhao Fan, Jin Xuan, Liu Du and Han Xuan. In 209, Liu Bei attacked the four southern Jing commanderies, and all four Administrators surrendered.

== See also ==
- Lists of people of the Three Kingdoms
