= Liu Cong =

Liu Cong may refer to:

- Liu Cong (Han dynasty) (劉琮; fl. 207–208), younger son of the late Han dynasty warlord Liu Biao
- Liu Cong (Han-Zhao) (劉聰; died 318), emperor of Han Zhao of the Sixteen Kingdoms
