= High ground =

Area of elevated terrain

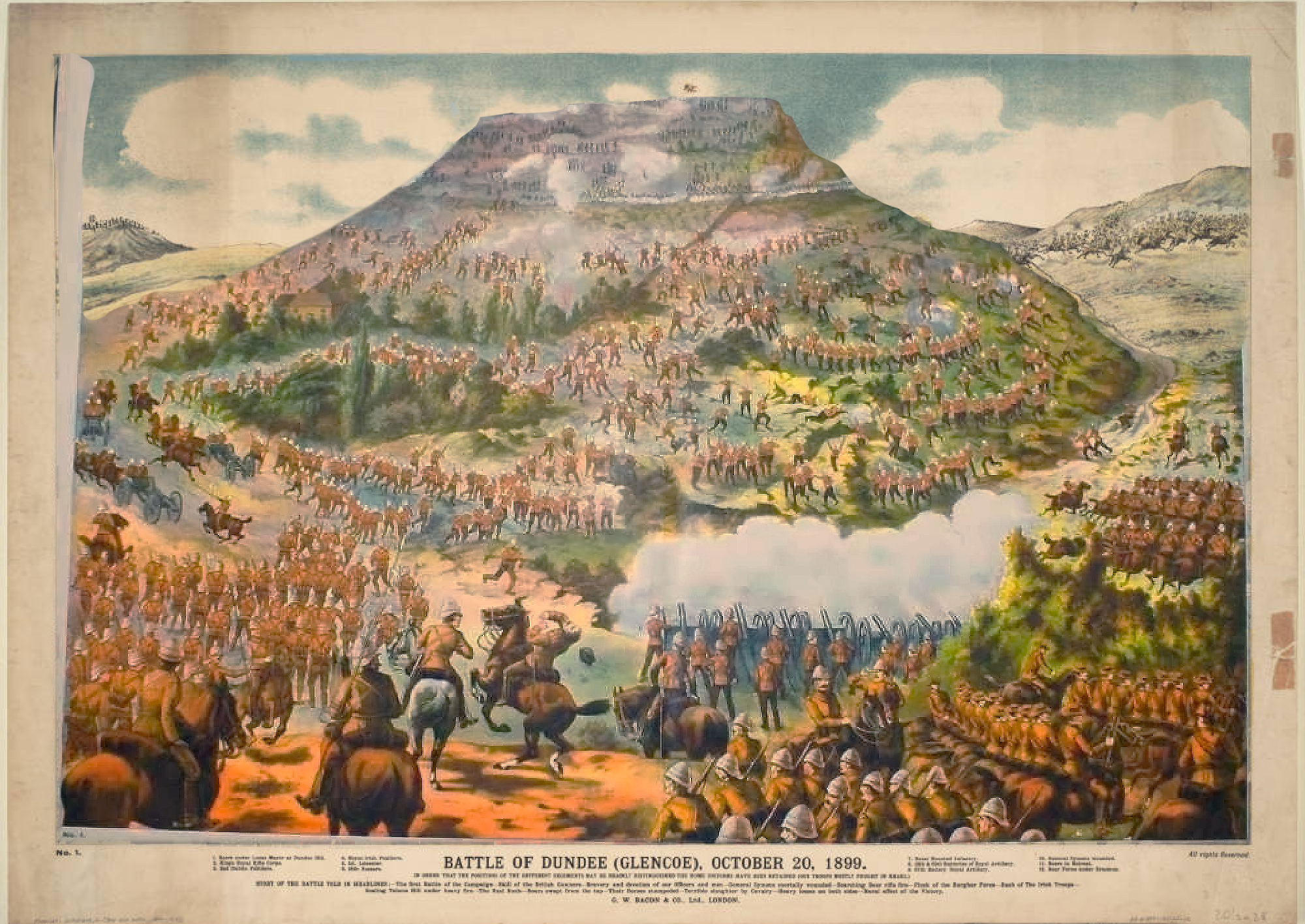
Depiction of the Battle of Talana Hill in 1899

High ground is an area of elevated terrain, which can be useful in combat. The military importance of the high ground has been recognized for over 2,000 years, citing early examples from China and other early-dynastic cultures who regularly engaged in territorial/power struggles. Later incorporated to be advantageous in architectural designs such as castles and fortresses which included towers and walls designed to provide structural advantages for positions of troops and weaponry which could be thrown or fired from above.

== History ==
In Sun Tzu's The Art of War, military leaders are advised to take high ground and let the enemy try to attack from a lower position. Fighting from an elevated position is said to be easier for a number of tactical reasons. Holding the high ground offers an elevated vantage point with a wide field of view, enabling surveillance of the surrounding landscape, in contrast to valleys which offer a limited field of view.

General Ji Ling of the late Eastern Han dynasty used this principle to his advantage by sending lookouts to positions of higher-ground to scout for and provide early warning about enemy troops. Additionally, soldiers fighting uphill are assumed to tire more quickly and will move more slowly, when compared to soldiers fighting downhill, who do not have to struggle against the forces of gravity alongside natural obstacles in the terrain. Furthermore, soldiers who are elevated above their enemies can get greater range out of low-speed projectiles (such as rocks, javelins/spears, arrows, grenades, etc.), whereas low-speed projectiles have a shorter range when thrown uphill.

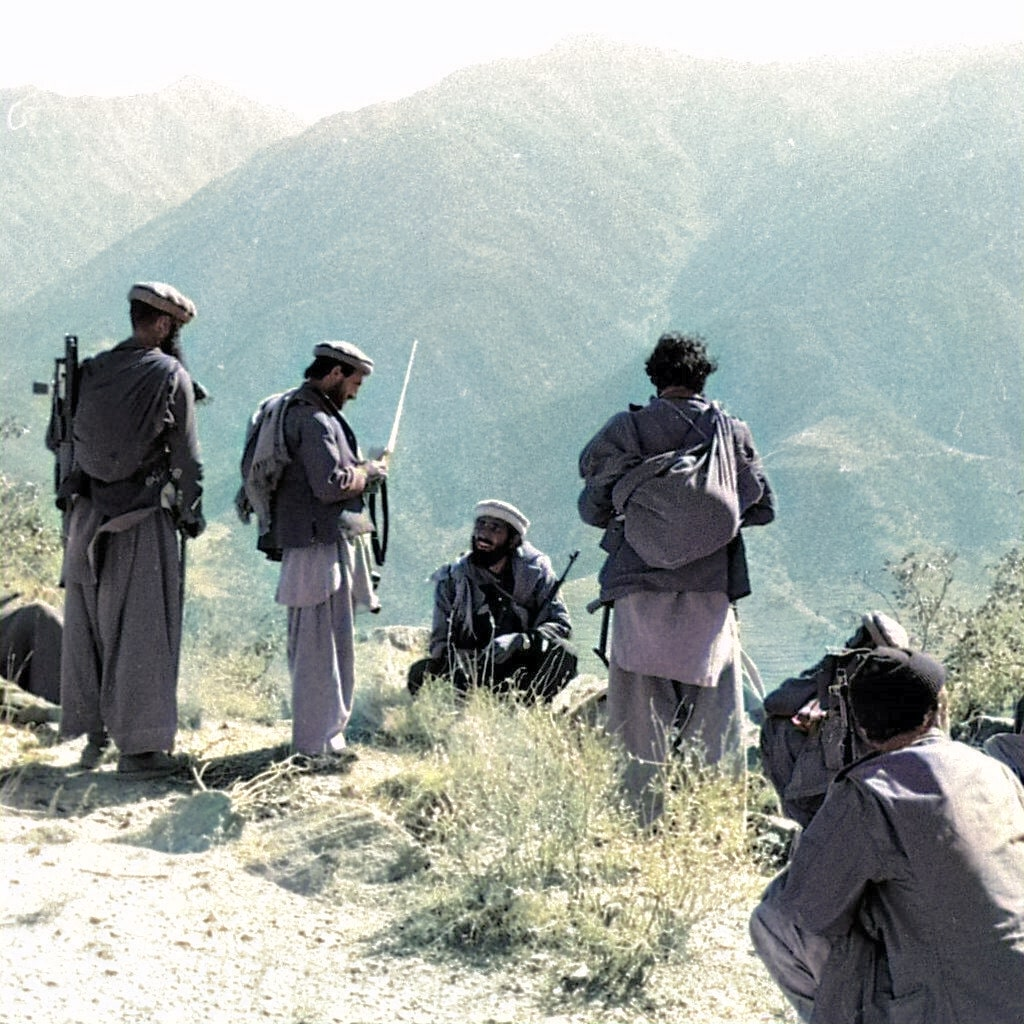
Mujahideen in Kunar Province, Afghanistan

Very steep and/or rocky terrain, like mountain sides, can be an obstacle to tanks and armored personnel carriers, or in the past to cavalry and war elephants. For example, in the Soviet–Afghan War, mujahideen guerrillas based themselves in the mountains of Afghanistan, thereby protecting themselves from the Soviet motorized divisions. This forced the Soviets to rely heavily on helicopters to conduct the war, but the United States gave the mujahideen FIM-92 Stinger anti-aircraft missiles, which, arguably, combined with the defense of the mountains, was able to win the war for the mujahideen. High ground was also employed in the 1423 Battle of Horic in Bohemia, where Taborite soldiers took to high ground, forcing the Utraquist cavalry to dismount to attack them, and also rendering their cannons ineffective. Taborite soldiers were eventually able to make a downhill charge and wipe out the remaining Utraquists. Here again, high ground played a crucial role in the outcome of the battle.

However, getting the high ground is not always advantageous. In the Battle of Jieting of the Three Kingdoms period of China, Shu Han forces occupied a hilltop, which Cao Wei forces soon surrounded and isolated the Shu forces from water supplies and reinforcements. The Shu forces suffered a humiliating defeat, and the Shu northern expedition had to be aborted.

== As an idiom ==
If people claim to have the "moral high ground", that means that they consider themself morally superior to others. This idiom may be reflective of a broader concept in which morality is viewed metaphorically as "high" and immorality is viewed as "low".

== In popular culture ==
This tactic was referenced in an iconic scene in Star Wars: Episode III - Revenge of the Sith, with Obi-Wan Kenobi saying "It's over, Anakin! I have the high ground!" - implying that he believed his victory in their duel was assured due to him having the advantageous high ground.

== See also ==
- Mountain warfare
- Inclined plane
- Battle of Kamdesh
