= Cai Mao =

2nd/3rd-century Eastern Han dynasty general

- 蔡瑁

Changshui Colonel (長水校尉)
- In office ?–?
- Monarch: Emperor Xian of Han
- Chancellor: Cao Cao

Major (司馬)
- In office ?–?
- Monarch: Emperor Xian of Han
- Chancellor: Cao Cao

Assistant Officer of the Household (從事中郎)
- In office ?–?
- Monarch: Emperor Xian of Han
- Chancellor: Cao Cao

General Who Guards the South (鎭南將軍) (under Liu Biao)
- In office 192 – ?
- Monarch: Emperor Xian of Han

Personal details
- Born: Unknown Xiangyang, Hubei
- Died: Unknown
- Parent: Cai Feng (father)
- Relatives: Lady Cai (sister); Huang Chengyan's wife (sister); Zhang Wen's wife (aunt)
- Occupation: Military officer
- Courtesy name: Degui (德珪)
- Peerage: Marquis of Hanyang Village (漢陽亭侯)

Cai Mao (fl.190-208), courtesy name Degui, was a military officer serving under the warlords Liu Biao and Cao Cao during the late Eastern Han dynasty of China.

== Life ==
Cai Mao came from the elite Cai family in Xiangyang, Nan Commandery (南郡), the capital of Jing Province (covering present-day Hubei and Hunan). His father was Cai Feng (蔡諷). His aunt (Cai Feng's sister) married Zhang Wen, who served as the Grand Commandant (太尉) during the reign of Emperor Ling. Cai Mao had two sisters – one married Huang Chengyan (Note: Huang Chengyan and his wife gave birth to a daughter, who married Zhuge Liang.) while the other married Liu Biao. Cai Mao also had two other notable relatives: Cai Zan (蔡瓚), courtesy name Maogui (茂珪), who served as the Chancellor of Mei (郿相); and Cai Yan (蔡琰), (Note: Not to be confused with Cai Wenji, who is also known as Cai Yan.) courtesy name Wengui (文珪), who served as the Administrator of Ba Commandery (巴郡太守). The Cai family would later be robbed and massacred by bandits during the Yongjia era (307–313) of the reign of Emperor Huai of the Jin dynasty (266–420).

Cai Mao was known for being arrogant and proud. He served as a military officer under his brother-in-law Liu Biao, the Governor of Jing Province. In 190, when Liu Biao first started his tenure in Jing Province, Cai Mao, along with Kuai Liang and Kuai Yue, assisted him in quelling local rebellions and consolidating control over the province. Cai Mao subsequently served as the Administrator (太守) of various commanderies in Jing Province, including Jiangxia (江夏), Nan Commandery (南郡) and Zhangling (章陵). In 192, after Liu Biao received the honorary appointment of General Who Guards the South (鎭南將軍) from the Han imperial court, he appointed Cai Mao as his military strategist.

Liu Biao had two sons – Liu Qi and Liu Cong – born to his first wife. The younger one, Liu Cong, married a niece of Cai Mao's sister Lady Cai, so the Cai family favoured him and wanted him to succeed Liu Biao as the Governor of Jing Province in the future even though Liu Qi, being the elder son, should be the rightful successor. In 208, Cai Mao and Liu Biao's maternal nephew Zhang Yun (張允) plotted to harm Liu Qi. When Liu Qi heard about it, he found an excuse to leave Xiangyang and be the Administrator of Jiangxia Commandery. After Liu Biao's death later that year, Liu Cong became the new Governor of Jing Province with support from the Cai family.

In late 208, when the warlord Cao Cao, who controlled the Han central government and the figurehead Emperor Xian, led an army south to attack Jing Province, Cai Mao, Kuai Yue, Zhang Yun and others managed to persuade Liu Cong to surrender to Cao Cao. As Cai Mao had known Cao Cao since their younger days, Cao Cao treated him well and even visited his home. From then on, Cai Mao served under Cao Cao and subsequently held the following positions in Cao Cao's administration: Assistant Officer of the Household (從事中郎), Major (司馬) and Changshui Colonel (長水校尉). He was also enfeoffed as the Marquis of Hanyang Village (漢陽亭侯).

== In Romance of the Three Kingdoms ==
In the 14th-century historical novel Romance of the Three Kingdoms, Cai Mao is cast as a minor villain of sorts alongside Liu Biao's maternal nephew Zhang Yun (張允). Both of them are said to be highly skilled and experienced in naval warfare, having served as the commanders of Jing Province's naval forces. In the novel, Cai Mao is also a maternal uncle of Liu Biao's younger son Liu Cong because Liu Cong's mother is Lady Cai (Cai Mao's sister). In 208, after Liu Biao dies, Cai Mao, Lady Cai and Zhang Yun go against his final wish by supporting Liu Cong to be the new Governor of Jing Province. Later that year, Cai Mao urges Liu Cong to surrender to Cao Cao, who has led a massive army to invade Jing Province. Cao Cao accepts the surrender and allows Cai Mao and Zhang Yun to continue leading the naval forces.

In the opening stages of the Battle of Red Cliffs in the winter of 208–209, Cai Mao and Zhang Yun lead Cao Cao's naval forces into battle against Sun Quan's navy, which is led by Zhou Yu. After losing in the initial skirmishes, Cai Mao and Zhang Yun suggest to Cao Cao to link all his battleships with iron chains to improve stability and reduce the chances of the soldiers falling seasick from all the rocking while sailing on the river. When Zhou Yu hears about it, he uses a scheme to trick Jiang Gan into believing that Cai Mao and Zhang Yun are planning to betray Cao Cao and defect to Sun Quan's side. Jiang Gan returns to Cao Cao with a fake letter as evidence of Cai Mao and Zhang Yun's "treachery". Cao Cao falls for the ruse and orders Cai Mao and Zhang Yun to be executed. Although he realises his mistake later, it is too late.

== See also ==
- Lists of people of the Three Kingdoms
