= Kuai Yue (Han dynasty) =

Adviser to Chinese warlord Liu Biao (died 214)

- 蒯越

Minister of the Household (光祿勳)
- In office 208 – ?
- Monarch: Emperor Xian of Han
- Chancellor: Cao Cao

Administrator of Zhangling (章陵太守)
- In office ?–?
- Monarch: Emperor Xian of Han

Prefect of Ruyang (汝陽令)
- In office ?–?
- Monarch: Emperor Ling of Han

Personal details
- Born: Unknown Xiangyang, Hubei
- Died: 214
- Relations: Kuai Liang (brother)
- Occupation: Official
- Courtesy name: Yidu (異度)
- Peerage: Marquis of Fan Village (樊亭侯)

Kuai Yue (died 214), courtesy name Yidu, was an adviser to the warlord Liu Biao during the late Eastern Han dynasty of China. He was the younger brother of Kuai Liang. When Liu Biao died and Liu Cong succeeded him, Kuai Yue recommended that he surrender to Cao Cao. Cao Cao later praised Kuai Yue, saying, "I would rather obtain Kuai Yue than Jing Province."

== See also ==
- Lists of people of the Three Kingdoms
