= Huang Chengyan =

Third century Chinese scholar

Huang Chengyan 黃承彥
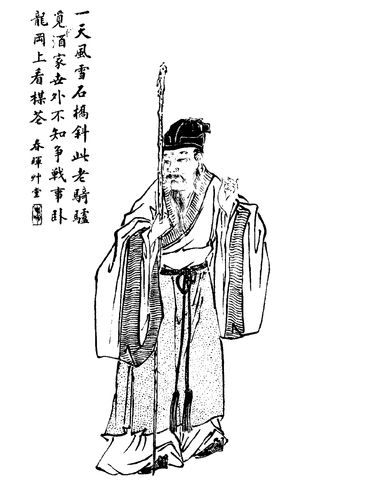
- A Qing dynasty illustration of Huang Chengyan
- Born: Unknown; Honghu, Hubei
- Died: Unknown
- Occupation: Scholar
- Spouse: Lady Cai
- Children: Lady Huang

Huang Chengyan (fl. third century) was a reclusive scholar who lived during the late Eastern Han dynasty of China. He was from Miannan (沔南), Jing Province, which is around present-day Honghu, Hubei. He was known for being carefree and open-minded.

== Family ==
Huang Chengyan married the elder daughter of Cai Feng (蔡諷). They had a daughter, whose name was not recorded in history and is better known by her fictional name "Huang Yueying". Lady Huang married Zhuge Liang, a chancellor and regent of the state of Shu Han in the Three Kingdoms period. Cai Feng's younger daughter married Liu Biao, the Governor of Jing Province in the late Eastern Han dynasty. Cai Feng also had a son, Cai Mao.

== In Romance of the Three Kingdoms ==
Huang Chengyan is a minor character in the 14th-century historical novel Romance of the Three Kingdoms, which romanticises the historical events before and during the Three Kingdoms period. He first appeared in Chapter 37 when Liu Bei, Guan Yu and Zhang Fei were visiting Zhuge Liang's house. He appeared again in Chapter 84 after the Battle of Xiaoting, in which he led Lu Xun out of Zhuge Liang's Stone Sentinel Maze.

== See also ==
- Lists of people of the Three Kingdoms
