= Zhao Fan =

3rd-century Chinese official

- 趙範

Administrator of Guiyang (桂陽太守)
- In office ? – c. 209
- Monarch: Emperor Xian of Han
- Chancellor: Cao Cao (from 208)
- Succeeded by: Zhao Yun

Personal details
- Born: Unknown
- Died: Unknown
- Relatives: one brother, Lady Fan (sister-in-law)
- Occupation: Official

Zhao Fan (fl. 200s–210s) was a government official who lived during the late Eastern Han dynasty of China.

== Life ==
Zhao Fan served as the Administrator (太守) of Guiyang Commandery (桂陽郡; around present-day Chenzhou, Hunan) around 208 and 209. In 209, the warlord Liu Bei led his forces to conquer the four commanderies in southern Jing Province: Wuling, Lingling, Changsha and Guiyang. The administrators of all four commanderies surrendered to him.

Liu Bei appointed his general Zhao Yun to replace Zhao Fan as the Administrator of Guiyang Commandery. Zhao Fan had a widowed elder sister-in-law, Lady Fan (樊氏), who was known for her beauty, and he wanted to arrange for a marriage between her and Zhao Yun. However, Zhao Yun declined, "I share the same family name as you. Your elder brother is also like an elder brother to me." There were some people who urged Zhao Yun to accept the marriage, but he said, "Zhao Fan was forced to surrender, so his intentions are unclear. They're so many other women in this world." Not long later, Zhao Fan escaped, and Zhao Yun was able to avoid any association with him because he did not agree to the marriage.

== In Romance of the Three Kingdoms ==
In the 14th-century historical novel Romance of the Three Kingdoms, Zhao Fan tries to arrange for Zhao Yun to marry his widowed elder sister-in-law. In the novel, however, Zhao Yun rejects the offer because he has become sworn brothers with Zhao Fan, so it is inappropriate for him to marry his sworn brother's sister-in-law.

== See also ==
- Lists of people of the Three Kingdoms
