= Lady Huang =

Shu Han chancellor Zhuge Liang's wife

Lady Huang 黃夫人
- Other names: Huang Yueying (黃月英)
- Spouse: Zhuge Liang
- Parents: Huang Chengyan (father); Lady Cai (mother)

Lady Huang, also known in fiction and folklore as Huang Yueying, was the wife of Zhuge Liang, the chancellor and regent of the state of Shu Han during the Three Kingdoms period of China. Her name was not recorded in history; "Huang Yueying" is simply a fictional name. In tales, Lady Huang was, however, remarkable for her erudition, being learned in strategy, geography, astronomy, and divination. Zhuge Liang heard of her intelligence, and courted and married her.

== In historical records ==
The only mention of Lady Huang in historical sources was in the Xiangyang Ji (襄陽記; Records of Xiangyang). In the fifth century, the account was added as an annotation by Pei Songzhi to Zhuge Liang's biography in the historical text Records of the Three Kingdoms, which was written by Chen Shou two centuries earlier.

The account stated that Huang Chengyan once told Zhuge Liang: "I heard you are looking for a wife. I have an ugly daughter with yellow hair and dark skin, but her talent matches yours." Zhuge Liang then married Huang Chengyan's daughter. At the time, there was a saying in their village: "Don't be like Kongming when you choose a wife. He ended up with A-cheng's (referring to Huang Chengyan) ugly daughter."

== In folklore ==
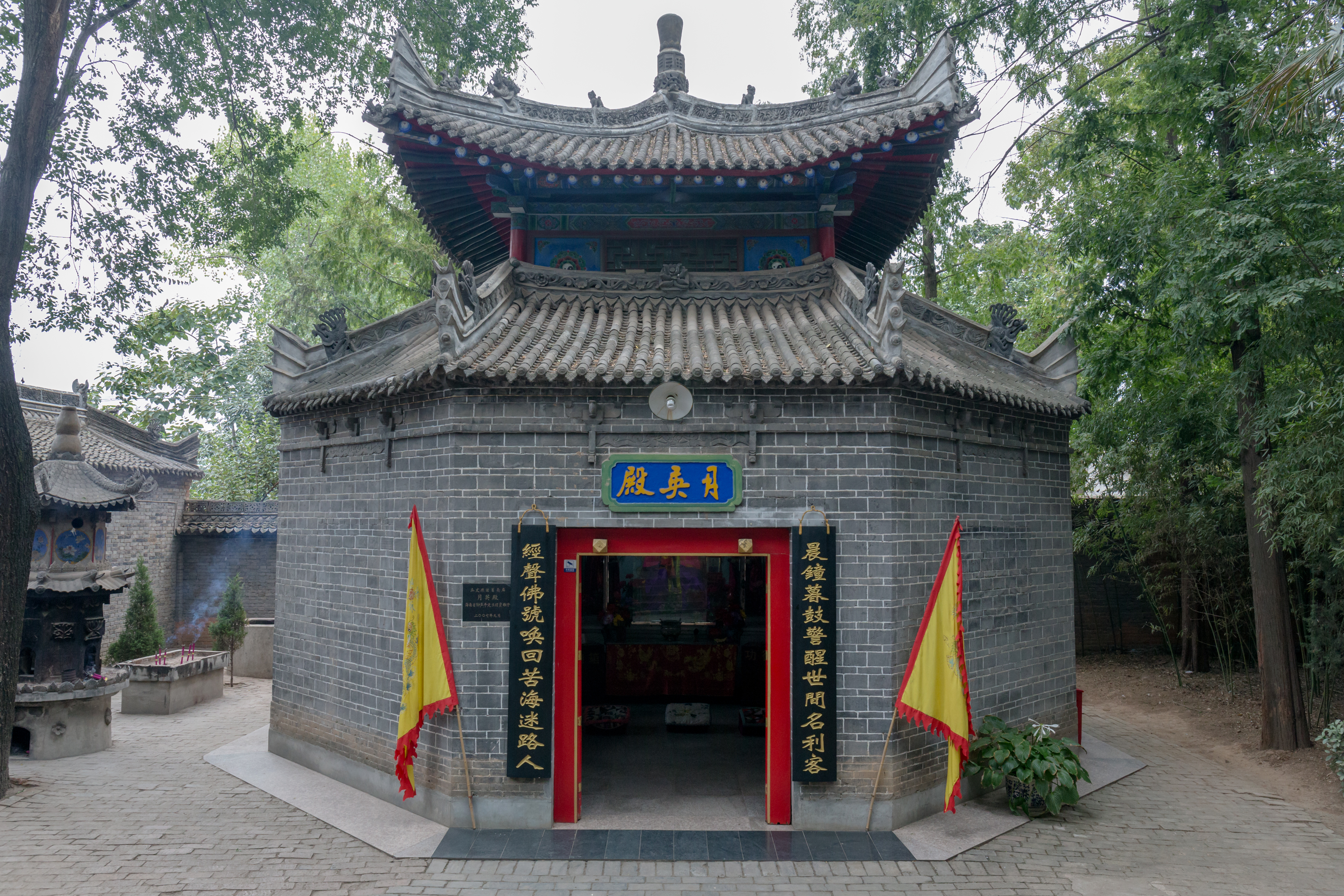
The Yueying Hall dedicated to Huang Yueying in the Temple of Marquis Wu, Wuzhang Plains

A story tells that Huang Yueying challenged her suitors to visit her personally by claiming that she was ugly. In the event that a suitor would visit her, she would hide herself under veils as a quiet dare to test their resolve. When Zhuge Liang came to her, her figure was silhouetted by moonlight and her head was covered with two red veils. Unlike other men, Zhuge Liang entered her room alone and did not hesitate in removing her disguises. As he removed the first veil from her face, he calmly stated that her ugliness was a misunderstanding by her father. Zhuge Liang was then rewarded by Huang Yueying's joyful visage and gratification.

Folktales ascribe to her the creation of not only Zhuge Liang's wooden ox and flowing horse but fantastic inventions, including cooking robots. Lady Huang did not long survive her husband, who died in 234 A.D. On her deathbed, she instructed her son Zhuge Zhan to "be loyal and filial."

A memorial for her exists in her supposed hometown of Huangjiawan (黄家湾) in Yao'an Village (姚庵村) outside Xiangyang.

== In popular culture ==
Huang Yueying is featured as a playable character in Koei's Dynasty Warriors and Warriors Orochi video game series. She is referred to as "Yue Ying" in the games up to Dynasty Warriors 7. Since Dynasty Warriors Next (on PS Vita) and Warriors Orochi 3, she is referred to as "Yueying" instead. She also appears in other games produced by Koei, such as Kessen II and all instalments of the Romance of the Three Kingdoms strategy game series.

She also appears in various other video games, such as Hou Feng San Guo Online, Zong Heng San Guo Online, Meng Jiang Zhuan Online, and Qun Ying Fu Online.

She appears in the manga The War of Greedy Witches.

She is portrayed by Gui Gui in the Taiwanese television drama K.O.3an Guo, which spoofs the historical novel Romance of the Three Kingdoms in a modern high school setting.

== See also ==
- Lists of people of the Three Kingdoms
