= Ji Ling =

Late 2nd century Chinese general serving Yuan Shu

- Traditional Chinese: 紀靈
- Simplified Chinese: 纪灵
Transcriptions
Standard Mandarin
- Hanyu Pinyin: Jì Líng

Ji Ling (fl. 196) was a military general serving under the warlord Yuan Shu during the late Eastern Han dynasty of China.

== In historical records ==
In late 196, Yuan Shu sent Ji Ling to lead 30,000 troops to attack a rival warlord Liu Bei. When Liu Bei requested aid from another warlord Lü Bu, Lü's subordinates said, "General, you've been wanting to kill Liu Bei. Now you can make use of Yuan Shu to help you kill him." Lü Bu replied, "No. If Yuan Shu eliminates Liu Bei, he'll be able to build a network with the warlords in the north and I'll end up being encircled by them." He then sent 1,000 foot soldiers and 200 riders to help Liu Bei. Ji Ling withdrew his forces and did not dare to make any move when he heard of Lü Bu's approach.

Lü Bu set up a camp one li southwest of Xiaopei (小沛; present-day Pei County, Jiangsu) and invited Ji Ling to his camp. Ji Ling also hosted a feast in his camp and invited Lü Bu to attend. Lü Bu went there and brought Liu Bei along with him. He told Ji Ling, "Xuande (Liu Bei) is my younger brother. I heard that he was trapped by you gentlemen, so I came here to help him. I don't enjoy getting into conflicts, but I enjoy helping others resolve conflicts." He then had a ji erected at the gate of the camp, and said, "Gentlemen, watch me fire an arrow at the lower part of the curved blade on the ji. If I hit it in one shot, all of you must withdraw your forces and leave. If I don't, you can remain here and prepare for battle." He then raised his bow and fired an arrow at the ji, hitting exactly the lower part of the curved blade. Everyone present at the scene was shocked. They said, "General, you possess godlike skill!" The following day, they threw another party and then withdrew their forces. This is the sole mention of Ji Ling in historical records.

== In Romance of the Three Kingdoms ==
Ji Ling has a greater role in the 14th-century historical novel Romance of the Three Kingdoms. He is first introduced in Chapter 14 during a battle between the forces of Yuan Shu and Liu Bei. He is from Shandong and he wields a war trident weighing 50 jin. He duels with Guan Yu and both sides end with a draw. He is also mentioned in the subsequent chapters. The incident involving Lü Bu's resolving of the conflict between Ji Ling and Liu Bei is further dramatised in Chapter 16. In Chapter 21, Ji Ling is slain by Zhang Fei while escorting his lord through Xu Province.

== See also ==
- Lists of people of the Three Kingdoms
