= Zhang Wen (Han dynasty) =

Chinese general and minister (died 191)

- 張溫

Minister of the Guards (衛尉)
- In office 191
- Monarch: Emperor Xian of Han

Grand Commandant (太尉)
- In office 186 – 187
- Monarch: Emperor Ling of Han

General of Chariots and Cavalry (車騎將軍)
- In office 185 – 186
- Monarch: Emperor Ling of Han

Minister of Works (司空)
- In office 184 – 185
- Monarch: Emperor Ling of Han

Minister of Finance (大司農)
- In office ? – 184
- Monarch: Emperor Ling of Han

Personal details
- Born: Unknown; Dengzhou, Henan
- Died: 5 November 191; Chang'an, Jingzhao
- Spouse: Lady Cai
- Occupation: Official, general
- Courtesy name: Boshen (伯慎)

Zhang Wen (died 5 November 191), courtesy name Boshen, was a Chinese official and military general of the Eastern Han dynasty. Zhang held prime ministerial office during the reign of Emperor Ling of Han, serving as Grand Excellency of Works from 184 to 185 and Grand Commandant from 186 to 187. Zhang oversaw the dynasty's military response to the Liang Province Rebellion from 185 to 186, supervising the future warlords Dong Zhuo and Sun Jian. After Dong seized control of the Eastern Han court in 189 and relocated it from Luoyang to Chang'an, Zhang continued to serve in ministerial office while conspiring against Dong. He was executed in November 191 at Dong's order.

== Life ==
Zhang's family was based in Nanyang Commandery. He had at least one brother, Zhang Chang, who held commandery office under Emperor Huan and in the offices of General-in-Chief Dou Wu in 168 (De Crespigny, 1036). Zhang Wen was a protégé of the influential court eunuch Cao Teng and served in the Imperial Secretariat during Emperor Huan's reign. In 164, Zhang accompanied Emperor Huan on a progress to the Yangtze River, an event memorialized by an anecdote about an old man who piqued Zhang's curiosity by ignoring the passing imperial entourage. When Zhang approached him, the old man criticized the emperor's luxurious lifestyle and the accordant burdens placed on the populace, allegedly prompting Zhang to feel ashamed.

Zhang later served as Administrator of Yingchuan Commandery. By 184, he was Minister of Finance, and was promoted in the same year to the prime ministerial office of Grand Excellency of Works. Although Zhang was considered a competent official and well-qualified for the post, he was compelled to pay a bribe to secure his appointment, pursuant to a much-criticized practice introduced by the reigning Emperor Ling. Zhang was serving as Grand Excellency at the time of the Yellow Turban Rebellion and persuaded the emperor not to dismiss the military commander Zhu Jun, who ultimately achieved success in his campaign against Yellow Turbans in Nanyang Commandery.

In 185, following the failure of the general Huangfu Song to suppress a multiethnic rebellion in Liang Province, Zhang was appointed General of Chariots and Cavalry and assigned to lead a 100,000-strong army against the rebels. Zhang experienced difficulty in managing his subordinate general Dong Zhuo, who reportedly treated Zhang with disdain. Nevertheless, recognizing Dong's popularity among the soldiery, Zhang allegedly rejected the urgings of his military advisor Sun Jian that Dong be executed. Zhang's campaign was inconclusive, despite a victory scored by Dong in the winter of 185-186, and although he was appointed Grand Commandant in 186, he resigned in the following year due to the continued unrest.

In 188, Zhang returned to office as Colonel-Director of Retainers, which, while not a prime ministerial office, was a highly influential position that reported directly to the emperor. While serving in this role, he recommended that Emperor Ling assign He Xun, who at the time was plotting a coup against the eunuch faction, as intendant of Jingzhao Commandery. Although Emperor Ling, who favored He, was reluctant to follow Zhang's recommendation, the eunuch Jian Shi persuaded him to do so and He was duly assigned to Jingzhao. In the following year, Emperor Ling died and the court came under the control of Dong Zhuo, by now a preeminent western warlord. Establishing himself as a de facto regent, Dong deposed Emperor Ling's heir Emperor Shao and installed Emperor Ling's younger son, Emperor Xian, on the throne before moving the court west, from Luoyang to Chang'an, in the face of coalescing military opposition from the eastern aristocracy.

Zhang accompanied the court to Chang'an and was appointed Minister of the Guards by 191. Displeased with Dong's harsh rule, Zhang conspired against him with Wang Yun, the Grand Excellency Over the Masses and Prefect of the Masters of Writing. Before these efforts could bear fruit, Dong was advised by the court astronomer of a prophecy foretelling the death of a prominent minister and ordered Zhang's execution as a means of satisfying the prophecy, accusing him of communicating with the eastern coalition. Zhang was executed on 5 November 191 by being flogged to death in the Chang'an marketplace.

== In Romance of the Three Kingdoms ==
In the 14th-century historical novel Romance of the Three Kingdoms, Zhang Wen is murdered by Lü Bu at a dinner party with many officials present. Lü Bu is the foster son of the tyrannical warlord Dong Zhuo, who orders him to take Zhang Wen away from the assembly, cut off his head, and bring it back on a silver platter to show the other guests. Dong Zhuo then announces to the other officials that a letter has been discovered from Zhang Wen to Yuan Shu, one of Dong Zhuo's rival warlords, in which Zhang Wen had been collaborating against him. Dong Zhuo tells the rest of the assembly not to worry as none of them are implicated in the letter.

== See also ==
- Lists of people of the Three Kingdoms
