= Liu Qi (Liu Biao's son) =

Chinese general and politician (died 209)

- 劉琦

Inspector of Jing Province (荊州刺史) (nominal)
- In office 209
- Monarch: Emperor Xian of Han
- Preceded by: Liu Cong (as Governor)
- Succeeded by: Liu Bei (as Governor)

Personal details
- Born: Unknown
- Died: 209
- Parents: Liu Biao (father); Lady Chen (mother)
- Relatives: Liu Cong (brother); Liu Xiu (brother); Wang Zhangxu's mother (sister); Lady Cai (stepmother); Lady Cai's niece (sister-in-law)
- Occupation: Military general, politician

Liu Qi (died 209) was a Chinese military general and politician who lived during the late Eastern Han dynasty. He was the elder son of Liu Biao, the Governor of Jing Province. He provided reinforcements and refuge for Liu Bei when the latter was fleeing from Cao Cao's forces after the Battle of Changban, and assisted Liu Bei and Zhou Yu in the following Battle of Red Cliffs.

== Fraternal strife ==
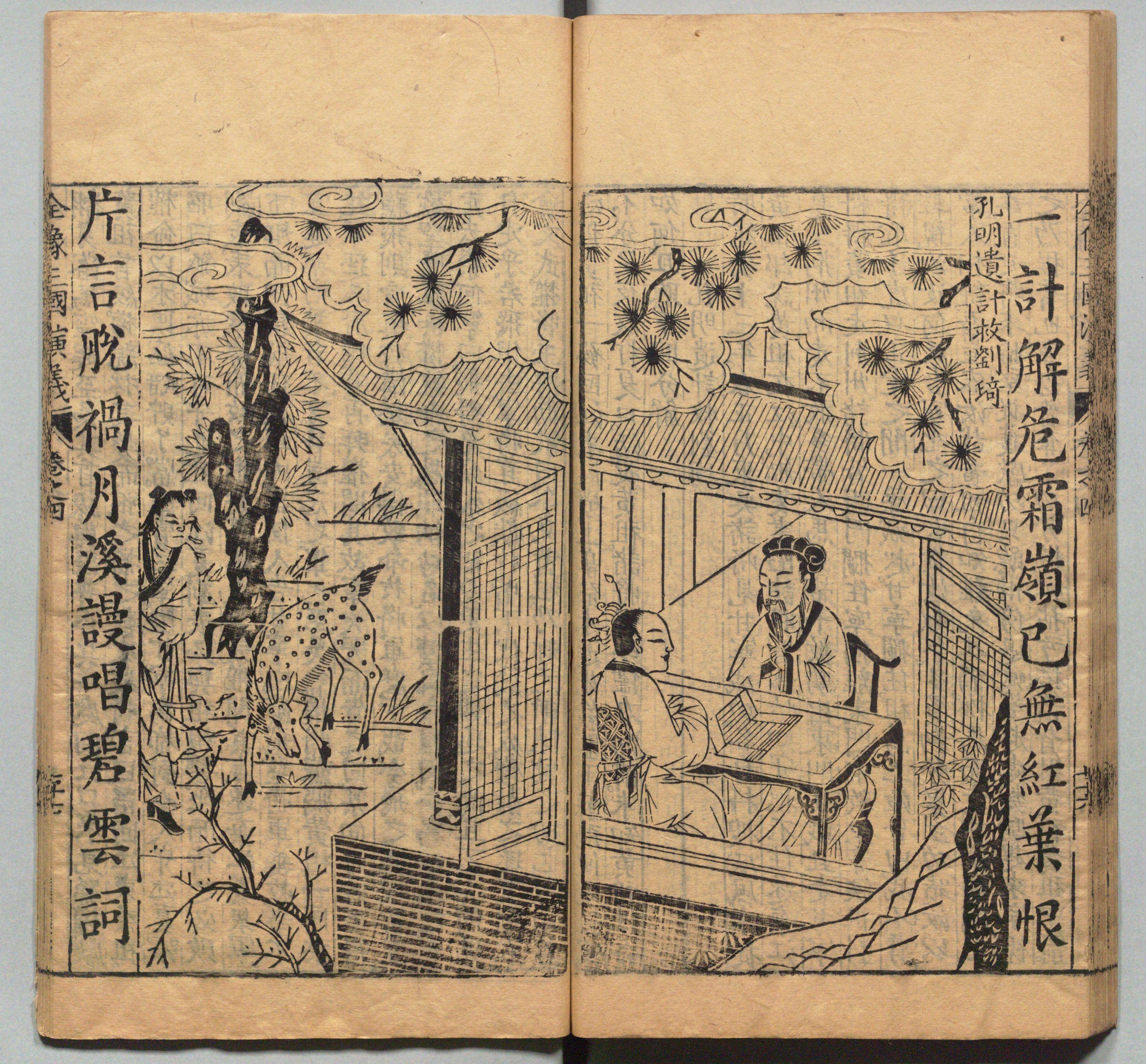
Ming dynasty woodblock illustration of Liu Qi seeking advice from Zhuge Liang

Although Liu Qi was Liu Biao's firstborn son, his younger brother Liu Cong had better prospects of succeeding Liu Biao because he married the niece of Lady Cai, Liu Biao's second wife. The Cai family faction, whose members included Cai Mao and Zhang Yun (張允), had a powerful presence in Liu Biao's administration. As the Cai family faction gained influence, they increasingly pressured Liu Biao to designate Liu Cong as his heir to the governorship of Jing Province.

When Liu Qi turned to Zhuge Liang for advice on self-preservation, the latter refused to help him. It is recorded that Liu Qi tricked Zhuge Liang into climbing up a tower while visiting the garden. While they were chatting and feasting in the tower, Liu Qi secretly instructed his servants to remove the ladder. He then told Zhuge Liang, "Now, nothing goes up to Heaven and nothing goes down to Earth. Whatever you say will be heard by me only. Can't you say something now?" Zhuge Liang replied, "Sir, haven't you read that Shensheng was in danger because he remained in Jin while Chong'er was safe because he was outside Jin?" Liu Qi understood what Zhuge Liang was alluding to, and secretly came up with an idea.

Following the death of Huang Zu after the Battle of Jiangxia in 208, Liu Qi volunteered to be the new Administrator of Jiangxia (present-day Xinzhou District, Wuhan, Hubei), about 250 km southeast of Jing Province's capital in Xiangyang. Sources differ on whether Liu Qi requested this appointment to escape the fraternal conflict or if he was forced out of the capital by the Cai family faction. In any case, he seemed to have been tasked with leading a counterattack against the forces of the warlord Sun Quan, who had seized control of Jiangxia Commandery following his victory over Huang Zu.

Shortly after Liu Qi's move to Jiangxia Commandery, Liu Biao died suddenly in Xiangyang and Liu Cong succeeded him as the Governor of Jing Province. Liu Qi henceforth treated Liu Cong like an enemy, and may have attacked him had not it not been for the arrival of Cao Cao's army.

Cao Cao's army arrived from the north, not far from Xiangyang. Liu Qi fled south across the Yangtze. Lacking the numbers and political support to wage war with Cao Cao, Liu Cong took the advice of 15 of his senior advisers and surrendered his governorship of Jing Province to Cao Cao. Not long after this, Liu Bei, somewhat in dire straits after his disastrous defeat at the Battle of Changban, crossed the Han River into Jiangxia Commandery with some dozens of close associates and met up with Liu Qi. Liu Qi took his army and escorted Liu Bei back over the Han River to collect Liu Bei's forces that had scattered after the Battle of Changban.

== Battle of Red Cliffs ==
Liu Qi is claimed to have commanded about 10,000 troops. While this may be an exaggeration, it is probable that his local forces were comparable in size to the reconstituted forces of Liu Bei, including Guan Yu's fleet. The promise of 10,000 more men waiting to join up with his army may or may not have swayed Sun Quan's decision to order the combined assault against Cao Cao's men.

With what little historical information recorded about the Battle of Red Cliffs buried under centuries of accumulated legend, it is difficult to say to any degree what role Liu Qi's forces had in the battle, but with the combined forces of Sun Quan, Liu Bei, and Liu Qi facing an army much more numerous, his troops must have taken part in the battle, possibly under his direct command.

After the victory over Cao Cao, Liu Qi was appointed Inspector of Jing Province, finally succeeding his father, albeit in an incomplete way. He died at Jiangxia within a few months of his appointment. After Liu Qi's death, Liu Bei took over his position at the considerably higher rank of Governor of Jing Province.

== See also ==
- Lists of people of the Three Kingdoms
