= Liu Biao =

Chinese general and warlord (c.151–c.208)

- 劉表
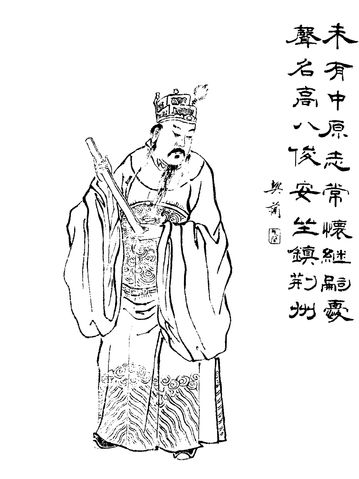
- A Qing dynasty illustration of Liu Biao

Governor of Jing Province (荊州牧)
- In office 192 – 208
- Monarch: Emperor Xian of Han
- Succeeded by: Liu Cong

General Who Guards the South (鎮南將軍)
- In office 192 – 208
- Monarch: Emperor Xian of Han

Inspector of Jing Province (荊州刺史)
- In office 190 – 192
- Monarch: Emperor Xian of Han

Personal details
- Born: 142 (Note: de Crespigny likely used "Stele of Liu Zhennan" (刘镇南碑) as his source of Liu Biao's age. The article indicated that Liu Biao was 67 (by East Asian reckoning) when he died. This article was found in vol.03 of "Anthology of Cai Zhonglang" (蔡中郎集), which was attributed to Cai Yong. However, Cai Yong died in c.June 192, 16 years before Liu Biao and so the authorship and veracity of the article is doubtful.) or c.151 Gaoping County, Shanyang Commandery (near modern day Yutai County, Shandong)
- Died: 208 (aged 66) Xiangyang
- Spouses: Lady Chen; Lady Cai
- Children: Liu Qi; Liu Cong; Liu Xiu; Wang Bi's grandmother
- Relatives: Liu Pan (nephew); Liu Hu (nephew)
- Occupation: Military general, politician, warlord
- Courtesy name: Jingsheng (景升)
- Peerage: Marquis of Chengwu (成武侯)

Liu Biao (Chinese: 劉表; pinyin: Liú Biǎo) (142 or c.151 (Note: According to Wang Chang's biography in Book of the Later Han, Liu Biao was 17 (by East Asian reckoning) when he became Wang's student. At the time, Wang Chang was Administrator of Nanyang. Wang Chang's biography recorded that he became Administrator of Nanyang soon after he regained the post of Master of Writing (尚书), upon recommendation from Chen Fan, who was then Grand Commandant. Emperor Huan's biography recorded that Chen Fan was made Grand Commandant in the 7th month of the 8th year of the Yan'xi era of his reign, and dismissed in the 7th month of the 9th year of the Yan'xi era; the two months correspond to 26 Jul to 24 Aug 165 and 14 Aug to 12 Sep 166 in the Julian calendar. Also, Wang Chang's biography recorded that he was shifted to another court position before being promoted to Minister of Works (司空) in the 1st year of the Jian'ning era of Emperor Ling's reign; Emperor Ling's biography dates the promotion to the wuchen day of the 4th month of the year. However, there is no wuchen day in that month; the month corresponds to 25 May to 22 Jun 168 in the Julian calendar. By combining the above observations, it is likely that Wang Chang was Administrator of Nanyang between 166 and 167. Thus by calculation, Liu Biao's birth year should be c.151.) – c. September 208 (Note: According to Liu Biao's biography in Book of the Later Han, he died of a back ulcer in the 8th month of Jian'an 13, during the reign of the Xian Emperor of Han. This corresponds to 29 Aug to 27 Sep 208 in the Julian calendar.)), courtesy name Jingsheng, was a Chinese military general, politician, and warlord who lived in the late Eastern Han dynasty of China. He is best known for serving as the governor of Jing Province (covering present-day Hubei and Hunan) from 192 until his death in 208. He was also a member of the extended family of the Han emperors through his ancestor Liu Yu, the fifth son of Emperor Jing. Liu Biao was described as a handsome man and was over eight chi tall (1.86 metres).

== Life ==
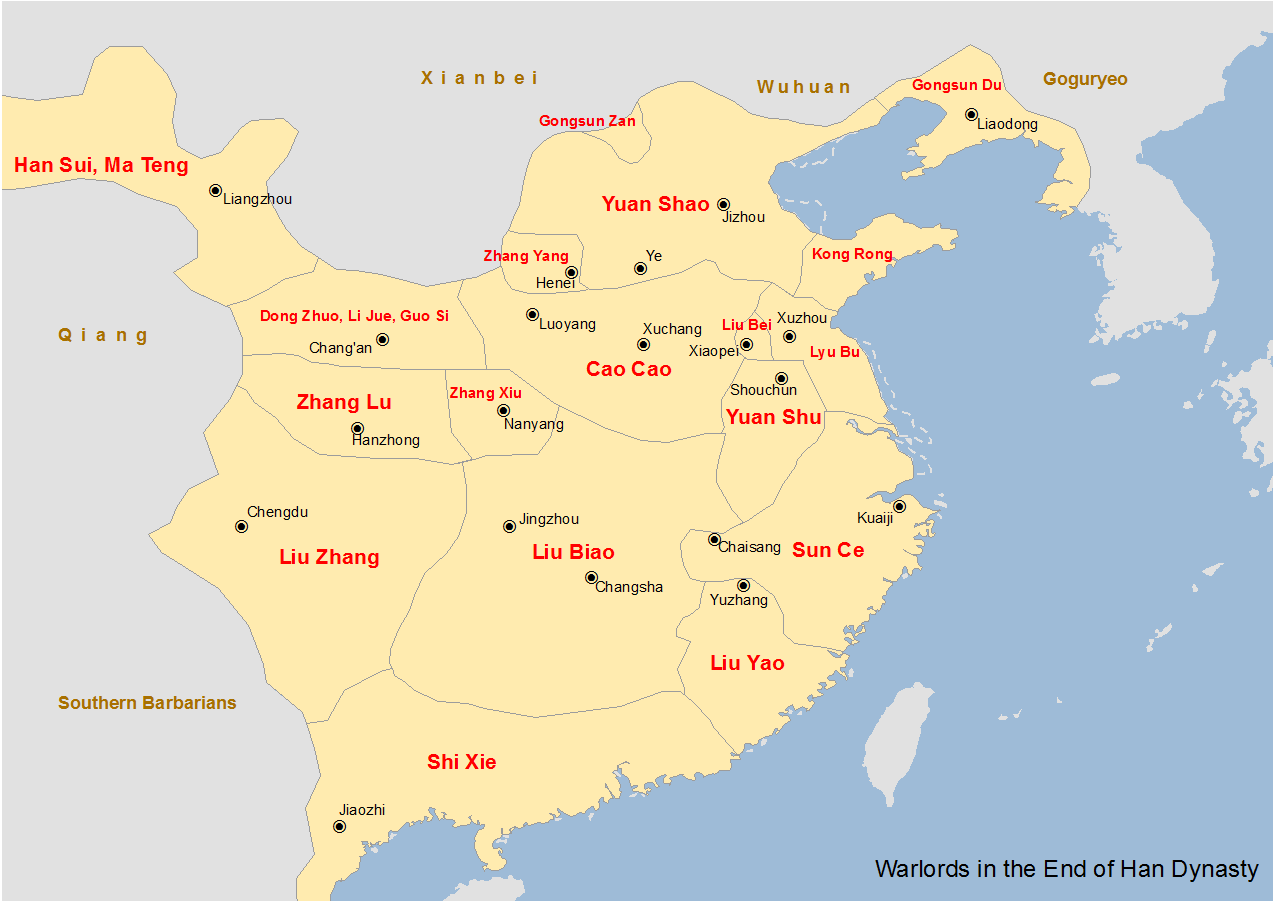
Map showing the major warlords of the Han dynasty in the 190s, including Liu Biao

In c.166 to 167, when Liu Biao was 17 (by East Asian reckoning), he became a student of Wang Chang (grandfather of Wang Can). At the time, Wang Chang was Administrator of Nanyang (南阳太守).

Liu Biao gained control of Jing Province (covering present-day Hubei and Hunan) in 190 CE, when Dong Zhuo appointed him to the position after the death of its previous governor (or inspector), Wang Rui. Liu Biao later started a war against the warlord Yuan Shu and his minor vassal, Sun Jian. During the Battle of Xiangyang, Sun Jian was put in command of an army on Yuan Shu's orders to assault Liu Biao in Jing Province. Liu Biao appointed Huang Zu to command the forces against Sun Jian. Huang Zu was outmaneuvered by Sun Jian, but the latter was hit by an arrow and killed, effectively ending the battle in favour of Liu Biao's forces. Years after, Sun Jian's two eldest sons, Sun Ce and Sun Quan, caused Liu Biao no end of trouble as they sought to avenge their father's death. However, they did not cause Liu Biao's demise as they targeted Huang Zu, who was a general under Liu Biao, instead of Liu Biao himself. While Cao Cao (in the north) was gaining strength, Liu Biao chose to neither help nor hinder his conquests, in part because he had been dealt a defeat against the forces of Sun Ce at the Battle of Shaxian (沙羡, in modern Wuhan, Hubei).

Around 200 CE, after Cao Cao's total victory over his archrival warlord Yuan Shao at the Battle of Guandu, Liu Biao still remained neutral, despite being one of the only other warlords in a position to oppose the two powers. However, Liu Biao eventually decided to shelter Liu Bei, an enemy of Cao Cao and relative in deep lineage when Cao Cao defeated Yuan Shao, where Liu Bei was previously sheltered after the events of 198 (Battle of Xiapi). This made Liu Biao a target of Cao Cao's wrath as Liu Bei rebelled against Cao Cao just before the war against Yuan Shao. After Cao Cao finalised his unification of northern China in 208, he led a large army south to conquer Jing Province. With a decline in relations between Liu Biao and Liu Bei as a result of the meddling of Cai Mao's family, Liu Biao's people faced much difficulty. To make matters worse, Sun Quan's army had defeated and killed Huang Zu at the Battle of Jiangxia and ultimately destroyed Liu Biao's defences to the east.

Shortly after Cao Cao's main army began its offensive, Liu Biao died of illness, probably a back ulcer. Liu Biao's successor, his younger son Liu Cong, chose to surrender instead of resisting Cao Cao's invasion. Liu Biao's elder son, Liu Qi, who had had some disagreement with Liu Cong, joined the fleeing Liu Bei, leading to the Battle of Red Cliffs. The aftermath of that battle split Liu Biao's former domain between the three resulting power blocs. Jing Province continued to be a flash point throughout the remaining years of the Han dynasty and well into the Three Kingdoms period, due to its strategic position between all three warring factions, with multiple battles and campaigns being fought for control of the province.

== Family ==
Liu Biao's first wife, Lady Chen (陳氏), bore him two sons: Liu Qi and Liu Cong. She died early, so Liu Biao took a second wife, Lady Cai (蔡氏) from the influential Cai family in Xiangyang. As Liu Cong married Lady Cai's niece, the Cai family favoured him and wanted him to succeed his father as the Governor of Jing Province even though Liu Qi, being the elder son, should be the rightful successor. A sibling rivalry developed between Liu Cong and Liu Qi. (Note: In the 14th-century historical novel Romance of the Three Kingdoms, Liu Qi and Liu Cong are half-brothers as Liu Cong's mother is Lady Cai, but historically they were born to the same mother.)

Around mid-208, Liu Qi found an excuse to leave Xiangyang and serve as the Administrator of Jiangxia Commandery. After Liu Biao's death in late 208, Liu Cong became the new Governor of Jing Province with the support of the Cai family. Later that year, he surrendered to the warlord Cao Cao when the latter led his forces to attack Jing Province. Cao Cao then appointed him as the Inspector of Qing Province. On the other hand, Liu Qi, who was in Jiangxia Commandery, became an ally of Cao Cao's rivals Liu Bei and Sun Quan at the Battle of Red Cliffs in the winter of 208–209. After the battle, Liu Bei nominated Liu Qi to be the nominal Inspector of Jing Province, but Liu Qi died of illness later that year.

Liu Biao had at least one more son, Liu Xiu (劉修), and a daughter. Liu Xiu followed Liu Cong when the latter surrendered to Cao Cao and went to Qing Province to serve as the provincial Inspector. In 210, Liu Xiu was appointed as the Administrator of Dong'an Commandery. He composed a number of poems, rhapsodies and formal hymns. Liu Biao's daughter married Wang Can's relative Wang Kai (王凱) and was the mother of Wang Ye (courtesy name Zhangxu); Wang Zhangxu was the father of Wang Hong and Wang Bi. (Note: Bowu Ji annotation in Sanguozhi, vol.28. The Wang Ye who betrayed Cao Mao was from Wuling Commandery. Also, Wang Hong has a biography in vol.90 of Book of Jin.)

=== Other relatives ===
Liu Biao had two nephews: Liu Pan (劉磐) and Liu Hu (劉虎).

Liu Pan participated in the battles against rival warlord Sun Ce under the command of Huang Zu, the Administrator of Jiangxia Commandery. He was defeated in battle by Taishi Ci, a general under Sun Ce. Later, after Liu Biao pacified Changsha Commandery (長沙郡; covering parts of present-day Hunan), he put Liu Pan and Huang Zhong in charge of guarding the commandery. It is not known what happened to him after that. In the 14th-century historical novel Romance of the Three Kingdoms, Liu Pan later came to serve Liu Bei through Huang Zhong's recommendation.

Liu Hu also participated in the Battle of Shaxian against Sun Ce under Huang Zu's leadership. Although many of Liu Biao's subordinates who fought in the battle were reportedly killed in action, it is not known whether Liu Hu was one of them.

== In popular culture ==
Liu Biao is featured as one of the available warlords that the player can choose from in Creative Assembly's game Total War: Three Kingdoms.

Ji Chenggong portrayed Liu Biao in the 2010 Chinese television series Three Kingdoms.

== See also ==
- Lists of people of the Three Kingdoms
