= Liu Cong (Han dynasty) =

Second son of Chinese Eastern Han warlord Liu Biao

- 劉琮

Inspector of Qing Province (青州刺史)
- In office 208 – ?
- Monarch: Emperor Xian of Han
- Chancellor: Cao Cao

Counsellor Remonstrant (諫議大夫)
- In office 208 – ?
- Monarch: Emperor Xian of Han
- Chancellor: Cao Cao

Army Adviser (參同軍事)
- In office 208 – ?
- Monarch: Emperor Xian of Han
- Chancellor: Cao Cao

Governor of Jing Province (荊州牧)
- In office 208
- Monarch: Emperor Xian of Han
- Preceded by: Liu Biao
- Succeeded by: Liu Qi (as Inspector)

Personal details
- Born: Unknown
- Died: Unknown
- Spouse: Lady Cai's niece
- Parents: Liu Biao (father); Lady Chen (mother)
- Relatives: Liu Qi (brother); Liu Xiu (brother); Wang Zhangxu's mother (sister); Lady Cai (stepmother)
- Occupation: Politician
- Peerage: Marquis

Liu Cong (fl. 207–208) was a Chinese politician who lived during the late Eastern Han dynasty of China. He was the younger son of Liu Biao, the Governor of Jing Province.

== Life ==
Liu Cong's ancestral home was in Gaoping, Shanyang (present-day Zoucheng, Shandong). He was the second son of Liu Biao, the Governor of Jing Province (荊州; covering present-day Hubei and Hunan). He was a descendant of Liu Yu, Prince Gong of Lu. He had an elder brother, Liu Qi, who was also born to Liu Biao's first wife Lady Chen. Their mother died early.

Liu Biao initially favoured his elder son Liu Qi because the latter resembled him in appearance. Liu Cong later married the niece of Liu Biao's second wife, Lady Cai. Due to this, the Cai family was naturally inclined to support Liu Cong, and they often spoke ill of Liu Qi in front of Liu Biao. Liu Qi fell out of his father's favour and heeded Zhuge Liang's suggestion to leave Jing Province's capital Xiangyang and travel to Jiangxia Commandery. On the other hand, Liu Biao loved Liu Cong deeply and wanted to let his younger son succeed him as the Governor of Jing Province. As a consequence, a rift developed between Liu Cong and Liu Qi.

In 208, Liu Biao became seriously ill, and Liu Qi returned from Jiangxia Commandery to visit his father. Lady Cai's younger brother Cai Mao and Liu Biao's maternal nephew Zhang Yun (張允) were worried that Liu Biao might change his decision after meeting Liu Qi, so they denied Liu Qi entry and refused to let him see his father. Liu Biao died shortly afterwards, and Liu Cong became the new Governor of Jing Province.

About a month later, the warlord Cao Cao, who controlled the Han central government and the figurehead Emperor Xian, led an army to invade Jing Province. Liu Cong's advisers Kuai Yue, Han Song (韓嵩), and Fu Xun urged him to surrender to Cao Cao. Liu Cong initially desired to put up resistance but was eventually persuaded by Fu Xun to dismiss the idea. When Cao Cao's army reached Xiangyang, Liu Cong surrendered to him. Cao Cao appointed Liu Cong as the Inspector (刺史) of Qing Province and granted him the title of a marquis. On Cao Cao's recommendation, Liu Cong was later promoted to a Counsellor Remonstrant (諫議大夫) and an Army Adviser (參同軍事).

== In Romance of the Three Kingdoms ==
In the 14th-century historical novel Romance of the Three Kingdoms, Liu Cong is born to Liu Biao's second wife Lady Cai. Lady Cai detests Liu Qi and she plots with her brother Cai Mao to have Liu Qi killed. Liu Qi evades danger by leaving Xiangyang and travelling to Jiangxia. Liu Cong succeeds his father as the Governor of Jing Province after the latter's death in 208.

When Cao Cao invades Jing Province later in 208, Liu Cong surrenders immediately and yields Jing Province. Liu Qi, however, defends Jiangxia and allies with the warlords Liu Bei and Sun Quan to resist Cao Cao. Cao Cao appoints Liu Cong as the Inspector of Qing Province and orders his soldiers to escort Liu Cong and his mother there. Unbeknownst to Liu Cong, Cao Cao secretly instructs Yu Jin to lead his men to kill Liu Cong and Lady Cai while they are on their way to Qing Province.

== See also ==
- Lists of people of the Three Kingdoms
