= Jingzhou (ancient China) =

Ancient Chinese territory

- Chinese: 荊州
Transcriptions
Standard Mandarin
- Hanyu Pinyin: Jīngzhōu

Jingzhou or Jing Province was one of the Nine Provinces of ancient China referenced in early Chinese texts such as the Tribute of Yu, Erya, and Rites of Zhou.

Jingzhou became an administrative division during the reign of Emperor Wu (r. 141–87 BCE) in the Western Han dynasty (206 BCE–9 CE). It usually corresponded with the modern-day provinces of Hubei and Hunan until the Sui dynasty, after which it referred to the city of Jingzhou.

== History ==
=== Pre-Qin era ===
In the Warring States period, the Chu state covered most of present-day Hubei and Hunan, the areas that would form Jingzhou in a later era. The Qin state dropped the name "Chu" (楚) (literally "chaste tree") and used its synonym "Jing" (荊) instead to avoid a naming taboo, since the personal name of Qin's King Zhuangxiang (281–247 BCE) was "Zichu" (子楚; lit. "son of Chu") because his adoptive mother, Lady Huayang, was from Chu. Chu was conquered by Qin in 223 BCE in the final stages of the Qin unification campaign.

=== Han dynasty ===
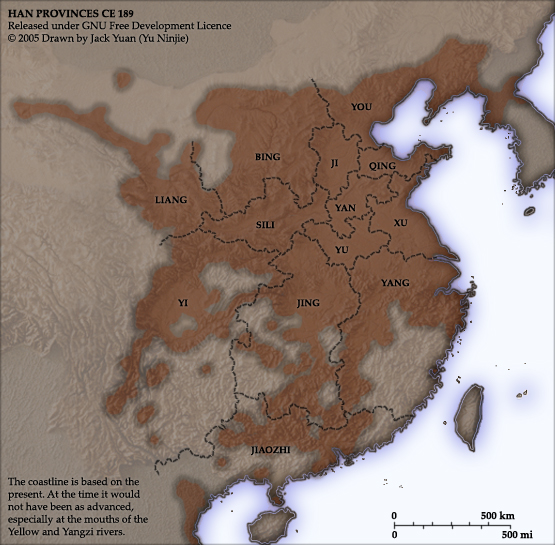
Map of Chinese provinces in the prelude of Three Kingdoms period. (In the late Eastern Han dynasty, 189 CE).

In 106 BCE, during the reign of Emperor Wu in the Western Han dynasty (206 BCE – 9 CE), China was divided into 13 administrative divisions (excluding the area under the central government's control), each governed by an Inspector (刺史). Jingzhou was one of the 13, and its land area was one of the largest, covering roughly the modern provinces of Hubei and Hunan, with the city of Nanyang in Henan province at its north frontier. However, Jingzhou did not have a provincial capital and was only an administrative division in name.

From 188 CE onwards, during the reign of Emperor Ling in the Eastern Han dynasty (25–220 CE), Jingzhou officially became an administrative division. The Book of Han mentioned that Jingzhou had seven commanderies – Nanyang (南陽; present-day southwestern Henan), Nan (南; present-day western Hubei), Jiangxia (江夏; present-day eastern Hubei), Changsha (長沙; present-day northeastern Hunan), Guiyang (桂陽; present-day southeastern Hunan), Wuling (武陵; present-day northwestern Hunan) and Lingling (零陵; present-day southwestern Hunan) – under its jurisdiction.

Before Liu Biao became the Governor (州牧) of Jingzhou during the reign of Emperor Xian, Jingzhou's provincial capital was in Hanshou county (漢壽縣; present-day Hanshou County, Changde, Hunan). However, as remnants of the Yellow Turban rebels were still active in southern Jingzhou, the capital was moved north to Xiangyang (襄陽; present-day Xiangyang, Hubei).

Liu Biao died in 208 and was succeeded by his younger son, Liu Cong, as the Governor of Jingzhou, but the latter surrendered and ceded the province to the warlord Cao Cao in the same year. After the Battle of Red Cliffs in the winter of 208/209, Cao Cao managed to retain only Nanyang and Nan commanderies in northern Jingzhou, while central and southern Jingzhou was divided between the warlords Sun Quan and Liu Bei. Cao Cao subsequently partitioned Xiangyang (襄陽) and Nanxiang (南鄉) commanderies from the two he controlled – Nanyang and Nan. The commanderies in Jingzhou were thus split between the three contending warlords: Nan, Lingling and Wuling to Liu Bei; Jiangxia, Guiyang and Changsha to Sun Quan; Nanyang, Xiangyang and Nanxiang to Cao Cao. It was believed that the term "Nine Commanderies of Jing and Xiang" (荊襄九郡) originated from the division of Jingzhou between the three powers, since each controlled three commanderies, making nine in total.

In 219, Sun Quan's general Lü Meng attacked and seized Liu Bei's lands in Jingzhou, which were defended by Liu's general Guan Yu. This triggered the subsequent Battle of Xiaoting (or Battle of Yiling) of 221–222, which concluded with Liu Bei being decisively defeated by Sun Quan's general Lu Xun. Since then, the state of Shu (founded by Liu Bei) had never laid claims on Jingzhou; Jingzhou was divided between the states of Wu (founded by Sun Quan) and Wei (founded by Cao Cao's successor, Cao Pi).

=== Three Kingdoms period and Jin dynasty ===
During the Three Kingdoms period (220-280), Jingzhou was split between the states of Wei (220–265) and Wu (229–280). The provincial capital of the Wei-controlled Jingzhou was in Xinye (新野), Nan Commandery, and it had seven commanderies – Nanyang (南陽), Jiangxia (江夏; north of the Yangtze River), Xiangyang (襄陽), Nanxiang (南鄉), Xincheng (新城), Shangyong (上庸) and Weixing (魏興) – under its jurisdiction. On the other hand, the Wu-governed Jingzhou had its administrative centre in Jiangling (江陵), Nan Commandery, with 11 commanderies – Nan (南), Jiangxia (江夏; south of the Yangtze River), Changsha (長沙), Xiangdong (湘東), Guiyang (桂陽), Linhe (臨賀), Lingling (零陵), Hengyang (衡陽), Wuling (武陵), Jianping (建平) and Yidu (宜都) – under its charge.

In the Western Jin dynasty (266-316), Jingzhou's capital was designated in Xiangyang (襄陽; present-day Xiangyang, Hubei) and it governed 23 commanderies and states.

=== Southern and Northern Dynasties period ===
During the Southern and Northern Dynasties period (420-589), China was further divided into many administrative divisions so the land area in each division was reduced. The Liu Song dynasty (420-479) established Jingzhou's capital in Xiangyang (襄陽; present-day Xiangyang, Hubei). The Southern Qi dynasty (479–502) changed Jingzhou's capital to Nan commandery and made Xiangyang (renamed to Ningman prefecture 寧蠻府) the capital of another province, Yongzhou. In 497, the Northern Wei dynasty (386–535) set up an administrative division called Jingzhou in Rang (穰; present-day Dengzhou, Henan), with eight commanderies under its charge. The capital was later moved to Shanbei (山北; present-day Lushan County, Henan). The Northern Wei dynasty also established an administrative division called East Jingzhou (東荊州), with its capital in Ciyang (泚陽).

=== Sui dynasty ===
In 583, during the Sui dynasty (589–618), Emperor Wen abolished the commandery system and replaced it with prefectures and counties as administrative divisions. However, Emperor Wen's successor, Emperor Yang, restored the commanderies and adopted the commandery and county system used in the Qin dynasty. From then on, Jingzhou no longer referred to the large province that used to cover Hubei and Hunan, but rather, the modern city of Jingzhou in Hubei. The city of Jingzhou was also known as Nan commandery (南郡), Jiangling commandery (江陵郡), Jiangling prefecture (江陵府), and Jingzhou prefecture (荊州府).

== See also ==
- Huguang
