= God of War, Zhao Yun =

- Also known as: Chinese Hero Zhao Zilong; Dynasty Warriors

Chinese name
- Traditional Chinese: 武神趙子龍
- Simplified Chinese: 武神赵子龙
Transcriptions
Standard Mandarin
- Hanyu Pinyin: Wǔ Shén Zhào Zǐlóng

Korean name
- Hangul: 무신조자룡
- Genre: Historical fiction, Romance
- Screenplay by: Li Lizhuo; Ying Ning; Yong Zheng
- Directed by: Cheng Lidong; Yuan Yingming; Guo Jianyong
- Presented by: Cheng Lidong; Gong Yu; Yang Bin; Dong Meng; Chi You
- Starring: Lin Gengxin; Im Yoon-ah; Kim Jeong-hoon
- Opening theme: Hero's Tears by Sun Mingyu
- Ending theme: The Pain of Separation by Zhang He
- Country of origin: China
- Original language: Mandarin
- No. of episodes: 49 (aired version); 60 (original version)

Production
- Executive producers: Yu Yang; Zhang Yurui; Gao Peiqi
- Producers: Zhao Jun; Yu Kangchun; Yuan Guang; Hua Hui; Zhang Libin; Zhang Xiaoping; Zhang Ning
- Production locations: Xiangshan Film City; Hengdian World Studios
- Editors: Wang Shicheng; Chen Guilun
- Running time: 45 minutes per episode
- Production companies: Zhejiang Yongle Entertainment Co., Ltd.

Original release
- Network: Hunan TV
- Release: 3 April – 7 May 2016

God of War, Zhao Yun, also known as Chinese Hero Zhao Zilong, released under the title Dynasty Warriors in Indonesia, is a 2016 Chinese television series directed by Cheng Lidong and produced by Zhejiang Yongle Entertainment Co., Ltd. The series starred cast members from mainland China, South Korea and Taiwan: Lin Gengxin, Im Yoon-ah and Kim Jeong-hoon. The story is loosely adapted from the 14th-century Chinese classical novel Romance of the Three Kingdoms, with Zhao Yun (Zhao Zilong) as the main character. It was first aired on Hunan TV from 3 April to 7 May 2016.

== Synopsis ==
Zhao Zilong was a military general who lived in the late Eastern Han dynasty and early Three Kingdoms period of China. With fighting skills, courage and charisma, Zhao Zilong initially served Gongsun Zan but switched his allegiance to Liu Bei for the rest of his illustrious career as a member of the famous Five Tiger Generals. However, when he becomes embroiled in a love triangle with the beautiful Xiahou Qingyi and another great warrior, Gao Ze, will he discover that battles of the heart are the most dangerous of all?

== Cast ==
=== Main ===
- Lin Gengxin as Zhao Zilong
  - Huang Tianqi as Zhao Zilong (child)
- Im Yoon-ah as Xiahou Qingyi / Ma Yunlu
  - Tao Yixi as Xiahou Qingyi (child)
- Kim Jeong-hoon as Gao Ze
  - Gao Zhenxuan as Gao Ze (child)
- Jia Qing as Gongsun Baoyue
- Collin Chou as Li Quan / Li Rending
- Zhao Yingzi as Li Feiyan
- Guo Dongdong as Liu Shen
  - Wang Pengchao as Liu Shen (child)
- Sun Xiaoxiao as Liu Qing'er
- Meng Ziyi as Shi Yan
- Godfrey Gao as Lü Bu
- Nazha as Diaochan
- Yan Yikuan as Liu Bei
- Fan Yulin as Gongsun Zan

=== Supporting ===
- Yu Rongguang as Zhao An
- Shi Xiaoqun as Zhao Zilong's mother
- Qi Hang as Xiahou Jie
- Zhang He as Geng Chun
- Sun Dachuan as Pan Yu
- Wen Haocheng as Zhou Huaizhong
- Li Mingzhu as Zhao Shimei
- Ding Xinmin as Yue Yuan
- Li Tianye as Guan Yu
- Zhu Laicheng as Zhang Fei
- Zhang Xiaochen as Ma Chao
- Zhang Shan as Huang Zhong
- Yang Le as Zhuge Liang
- Ma Xiaojun as Pang Tong
- Kang Se Jung as Sun Shangxiang
- Li Jun as Sima Hui
- Meng Yansen as Liu Bian (Emperor Shao)
- Zheng Wei as Liu Xie (Emperor Xian)
- Han Dong as Dong Zhuo
- Miao Haojun as Wang Yun
- Wu Diwen as Li Ru
- Xu Chong as Hua Xiong
- Liu Yapeng as Li Jue
- Xu Zhanwei as Guo Si
- Yan Wei as Zhang Ji
- Da Youwei as Fan Chou
- Li Xiaohang as Xu Rong
- Min Jian as Chen Gong
- Liu Ruogu as Liu Shan
- Wu Wei as Jian Yong
- Hu Bing as Sun Qian
- Liang Ailin as Lady Gan
- Huang Yina as Lady Mi
- Zhong Ming as Mi Fang
- Zhang Ying as Cao Cao
- Huang Yonggang as Xiahou Dun
- Wang Wei as Cao Hong
- Sun Xiaofei as Cao Ren
- Ma Yongkang as Xu Huang
- Sun Haoran as Zhang Liao
- Jiang Baocheng as Xu Chu
- Liu Jiaxi as Zhang He
- Lu Hongyang as Cheng Yu
- An Junqi as Xun You
- Wang Xiaowei as Liu Fu
- Zhang Hang as Chen Jiao
- Chen Jingyu as Xiahou En
- Wang Bin as Sun Jian
- He Gang as Sun Quan
- Li Yuan as Zhou Yu
- Yan Qingshu as Lady Wu
- Yang Guang as Elder Qiao
- Wang Kun as Lu Su
- Yang Hongwu as Huang Gai
- Yin Zhefei as Cheng Pu
- Cai Gang as Zhang Zhao
- Hong Zhao as Gu Yong
- Huang Chongfa as Kan Ze
- Huang Wei as Zhang Wen
- Liu Haotian as Lü Fan
- Tang Hao as Chen Wu
- Huang Xintao as Pan Zhang
- Bu Kang as Jia Hua
- Ren Luomin as Hua Tuo
- Wang Gang as Liu Biao
- Lu Ying as Lady Cai
- Li Lihua as Cai Mao
- Zhanqi as Zhang Yun
- Dalai Halihu as Yi Ji
- Liu Liu as Yuan Shao
- Yu Yankai as Wen Chou
- Li Yufu as Yan Liang
- Zhang Chengpeng as Qu Yi
- Zhou Xiaobing as Pang Ji
- Huang Zheng as Chen Zhen
- Luo Bin as Ma Teng
- Wang Jianxin as Han Sui
- Wang Haocheng as Ma Dai
- Tian Zhen as Jiang Gan
- Yu Boning as Zhang Ren
- Sun Hao as Zhou Cang
- Li Yanbing as Lady Mo
- Ma Jinghan as Mo Yang
- Xiaobaozi as Mo Yang's daughter
- Wang Zhengjia as Liu Zhang
- Mou Fengbin as Lei Tong
- Cheng Lixue as Lei Jiaojiao
- Dong Feng as Yan Yan
- Shen Xuewei as Huang Quan
- Zhang Lianchun as Wu Lan
- Wang Weiguang as Zhang Lu
- Ma Honglei as Yang Song
- Leng Haiming as Yuan Shu
- Yue Dongfeng as Ji Ling
- Qu Gang as Bao Xin
- Yu Zikuan as Han Fu
- Zhang Zhiyuan as Yan Gang
- Du Yiheng as Du Jue
- Wang Guan as Jiang Feng
- Tan Xueliang as Ma Qing
- Zhang Xiaopeng as Jiang Anguo
- Zhou Xiaofei as Lin Yue
- Sang Ping as Lü Peizhuang
- Li Haiming as Zhang Kui
- Xie Ning as Laosi
- Yuan Wu as Laowu
- Yu Hu as Laoliu
- Yang Yiwei as Laoba
- Xie Wenxuan as Xiaoyue
- Yiling as Ping'er
- Li Wanyu as Shuang'er
- Jin Jia as Zhou Shan
- Sun Jiaolong as Pei Yuanshao
- Wang Zizi as Xu Sanniang
- Cai Juntao as Laomo
- Fu Weng as Yue Jingfang
- Yuan Min as Zhao Fan
- Xian Seli as Lady Fan
- Liu Sibo as Lady Zhao
- Li Fei as Bao Long
- Cheng Peng as Chen Ying
- Gao Jin as Xiaohuzi
- Li Hongtao as Dong Huang
- Si Haozhao as Meng Guan
- Shi Chuan as Zhou Nan
- Chunlei as Chunyu Dao
- Zhou Bixiao as Xiaoxiao
- Liu Yonggang as Wang Zhong
- Luo Aixin as Cai Yang
- Zhang Xilai
- Nie Donghong
- Xia Bo
- Wang Gang

== Production and distribution ==
The series started filming in 2014 and wrapped up in 2015. Some footage from the 2008–2009 film Red Cliff was reused for the Battle of Red Cliffs scenes. The series premiered in mainland China on 3 April 2016 on Hunan TV and ran for 60 episodes.

The series was produced at a cost of nearly 250 million yuan (US$40 million). The drama is featured at the Hong Kong International Film and TV market (FILMART), which was held from 23 to 26 March 2015; it is reported that the overseas copyright prices offered for the drama has soared to US$100,000 per episode, setting a record for Chinese costume dramas exported to overseas markets. The series was sold to Japan at a cost of US$50,000 per episode and has become the most expensive Chinese television series exported to Japan.

== Soundtrack ==
God of War, Zhao Yun - Original Television Soundtrack (武神赵子龙电视剧原声音乐大碟)
No.	Title	Music	Singer	Length
1.	"Hero's Tears (英雄泪)" (Opening theme song)	Han Xingzhou	Sun Mingyu
2.	"The Pain of Separation (离伤)" (Ending theme song)	Yuan Dawei	Zhang He
3.	"Cold Beauty (冷红颜)"	Jiao Keke	Zeng Yiwu
4.	"Heartless Love (情字诀)"	Zhang Chang	Zhang He & Li Mingzhu
5.	"Closer and Further (渐行渐远)"	Zhang Chang	Kim Jeong-hoon & Zhang He
6.	"Becoming a Buddha (成佛)"	Zuo Muxiu	Dong Zhen
7.	"As High as a Mountain (山之高)"	Hutao Xiazi	Dong Zhen
8.	"Hero (英雄)"	Jiao Keke	Kim Jeong-hoon
9.	"Zi Long (子龙)"	Chen Xi	Fan Tao
10.	"Martial Deity Zhao Zilong (武神赵子龙)"	Long Jun	Long Jun

== Reception ==
The reaction to the series was overwhelmingly positive. On Chinese video streaming websites, it recorded 2.35 billion hits in a mere 13 days after its official release. Hunan TV also reported that the drama was being viewed 260 million times daily on average. In total, the series garnered more than 10 billion views. The drama's first episode had a 1.73% viewership rating, which in Chinese standards, is considered a tremendous success. The drama peaked at more than 2% in its later episodes.

=== Ratings ===
Hunan TV Premiere Ratings
Original broadcast date	Episode #	CSM52 city network ratings		
Original broadcast date	Episode #	Ratings (%)	Audience share (%)	Rank (timeslot)
2016.4.3	1-2	0.966	2.69	2
2016.4.4	3-4	0.817	2.29	7
2016.4.5	5-6	0.914	2.62	4
20164.6	7-8	0.914	2.58	3
2016.4.7	9-10	0.937	2.68	2
2016.4.8	11	0.693	1.99	6
2016.4.9	12	0.754	2.19	4
2016.4.10	13-14	0.827	2.26	5
2016.4.11	15-16	0.847	2.41	4
2016.4.12	17-18	1.042	2.98	1
2016.4.13	19-20	1.002	2.89	1
2016.4.14	21-22	1.008	2.95	1
2016.4.15	23	1.032	2.87	1
2016.4.16	24	1.049	3.06	1
2016.4.17	25-26	1.185	3.3	1
2016.4.18	27-28	1.364	4.01	1
2016.4.19	29-30	1.283	3.62	1
2016.4.20	31-32	1.435	4.07	1
2016.4.21	33-34	1.255	3.65	1
2016.4.22	35-36	1.367	3.75	1
2016.4.23	37	1.349	3.91	1
2016.4.24	38-39	1.512	4.17	1
2016.4.25	40-41	1.542	4.48	1
2016.4.26	42-43	1.455	4.16	1
2016.4.27	44-45	1.376	4.05	2
2016.4.28	46-47	1.244	3.69	2
2016.4.29	48	0.943	2.86	4
2016.4.30	49	1.05	3.28	2
Average ratings	1.140		3.26	

- Highest ratings are marked in red, lowest ratings are marked in blue

=== Awards and nominations ===
Year	Award	Category	Recipient	Result	Ref
2015	Global Luxury Award	Global Tourism Industry Congress Fusion Seminars	Im Yoon-ah, Lin Gengxin	Won	
2017	12th Asian TV Drama Conference	Special Recognition Award for Contribution to Asian Cultural Exchange	Im Yoon-ah	Won	

== International broadcast ==
The series's broadcasting rights were sold to streaming site Viki with English subtitles as well as various other television networks such as Chunghwa TV, Sichuan TV and Guangxi TV, and other countries such as Indonesia, South Korea, Japan, Cambodia and Thailand.
