= Du Wei =

Du Wei may refer to:

- Du Wei (Three Kingdoms) (fl. 190s–220s), official of the Shu Han state in the Three Kingdoms period
- Du Chongwei or Du Wei (died 948), general during the Five Dynasties period
- Du Wei (diplomat) (1962–2020), Chinese diplomat
- Du Wei (footballer) (born 1982), Chinese football player
- Du Wei (Water Margin), a character in Water Margin
