= Cheng Zhenjue =

3rd-century Chinese noblewoman

- 程貞玦

Personal details
- Born: Unknown Jianyang, Sichuan
- Died: Unknown
- Spouse: Zhang Wei
- Children: Zhang Yue (adopted)
- Relatives: Cheng Gong (uncle)
- Courtesy name: Qiongyu (瓊玉)
- Original name: Cheng Jue (程玦)

Cheng Zhenjue (fl. 210s–220s), courtesy name Qiongyu, originally named Cheng Jue, was a member of the Cheng clan in Niubing. She married Zhang Wei, but her husband died before the ceremony. She was noted for her filial piety toward her stepfamily, to be strong willed with a pure character.

== Life ==
Cheng Zhenjue was born in Niubing County, Qianwei Commandery (犍為郡), which is present-day Jianyang, Sichuan. She was the wife of Zhang Wei (張惟). She married him at the age of 19 (by East Asian age reckoning) however before the ceremony concluded, Zhang Wei died. Since they had no children, she adopted the son of her brother Yue (悅) as her own. She also took care of her step uncle and aunt diligently, day and night. Wang Chong of Zizhong wanted to marry her. However, her uncle Cheng Gong (程肱) told him that his niece had her own aspiration and that none could change her. Later, Wang Chong served as Investigator (督郵) (Note: A duyou (督郵; variously translated as "Investigator" or "Inspector") was an official representative of the Administrator (太守), the highest-ranked administrative officer in a commandery. His role was to patrol the counties in the commandery and audit/review the county-level officials' work.) under Li Yan when he was Administrator of Qianwei (犍為太守).

Li Yan sent an official to bring lamb and goose as a dowry gift, also ordered the marriage on behalf of Wang Chong. When she learned of this, Cheng Zhenjue attempted suicide by drowning but survived the event after being rescued. Impressed by her, the following Administrator (太守) Su Gao (蘇高) set up a watch for her. Thereafter her death, the Administrators of Shu sent official to posthumously grant her the name Zhenjue (貞玦) in commemoration of her spirit. (Note: the name "Zhen" (貞) means "chaste" in Chinese) The Administrator of Zhangling (太守章陵), Liu Wei (劉威) also wrote a eulogy to praise her.

== See also ==
- Lists of people of the Three Kingdoms
