= Xincheng Rebellion =

Revolt against state of Cao Wei (227-228)

Coordinates: 31.2°N 112.3°E

- Part of the wars of the Three Kingdoms period
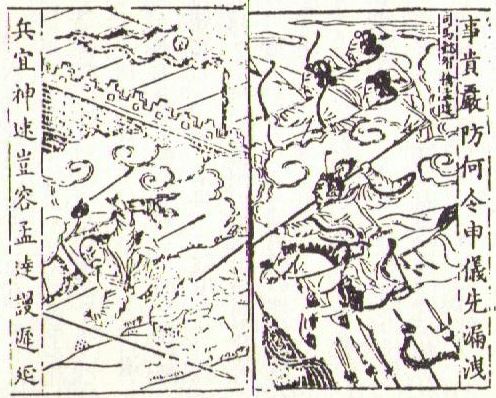
- An illustration of Meng Da being slain by Sima Yi's men
Date	c. December 227 (Note: The rebellion started in the 12th lunar month of the 1st year of the Taihe era in Cao Rui's reign. This month corresponds to 26 December 227 to 24 January 228 in the Gregorian calendar.) – c. March 228 CE (Note: The rebellion ended in the 1st lunar month of the 2nd year of the Taihe era in Cao Rui's reign. This month corresponds to 23 February to 23 March 228 in the Gregorian calendar.)
Location	Xincheng Commandery (covering present-day Fang County, Zhuxi County and Zhushan County in Shiyan, and Baokang County and Nanzhang County in Xiangyang, all located in northwestern Hubei province)
Result	Cao Wei victory; rebellion suppressed
Territorial changes	Xincheng retaken by Cao Wei

Belligerents
Cao Wei	Meng Da (with some support from Shu Han and Eastern Wu)

Commanders and leaders
Sima Yi	(executed) Meng Da

Xincheng Rebellion
- Traditional Chinese: 新城之亂
- Simplified Chinese: 新城之乱
Transcriptions
Standard Mandarin
- Hanyu Pinyin: Xīnchéng zhī luàn

The Xincheng Rebellion was a revolt that took place in the state of Cao Wei between late 227 and early 228 CE during the Three Kingdoms period. The rebellion was initiated by Meng Da, a former Shu Han general who defected to Wei and was placed in charge of Xincheng Commandery (located in the vicinity of present-day northwestern Hubei) in Jing Province. The revolt was swiftly suppressed within a month by the Wei general Sima Yi. Meng Da was captured and executed.

== Background ==
In 220, Meng Da, a general who formerly served the warlord Liu Bei, defected over to Liu's rival Cao Pi, who had inherited the title of a vassal king – "King of Wei" – from his recently deceased father, Cao Cao. (Note: In late 220, some months after the death of his father Cao Cao, Cao Pi forced Emperor Xian (the last ruler of the Eastern Han dynasty) to abdicate the throne to him. He then proclaimed himself emperor and established the state of Cao Wei, marking the start of the Three Kingdoms period.) Meng Da brought along his subordinates and their families, numbering over 4,000 in total. Cao Pi was pleased when he heard that Meng Da had come to join him, and he gave Meng a warm welcome. Cao Pi appointed Meng Da as the Administrator (太守) of Xincheng (新城) Commandery, which was located along the southwestern border of Wei.

At the time, many officials felt that Meng Da was untrustworthy and should not be given important responsibilities. The Wei general Sima Yi, who was stationed at Wan (宛; present-day Wancheng District, Nanyang, Henan) and oversaw the military affairs of Jing and Yu provinces at the time, also cautioned Cao Pi against putting too much faith in Meng Da, but Cao did not heed Sima's advice.

Meng Da was deeply favoured by Cao Pi, and he was also close friends with the Wei officials Huan Jie and Xiahou Shang. When Cao Pi died in 226, Huan Jie and Xiahou Shang had also died. Meng Da started feeling uneasy because he had been on the front line for a long time. Throughout Meng Da's service in Xincheng, he had been friendly with Eastern Wu (a state founded by Sun Quan) and had established strong defences against possible attacks from Wei's rival state Shu Han (founded by Liu Bei). Shu's chancellor-regent, Zhuge Liang, hated Meng Da for being capricious, (Note: Meng Da initially served Liu Zhang, a warlord in Yi Province (covering present-day Sichuan and Chongqing). He surrendered to Liu Bei in 214 after the latter seized control of Yi Province from Liu Zhang, and served under Liu Bei for about five years before defecting to Cao Pi. Zhuge Liang perceived Meng Da as an untrustworthy person who would switch his allegiances easily.) and was also worried that Meng would become a threat to Shu.

== Rebellion ==
Although the exact reason why Meng Da rebelled is unclear, two popular accounts regarding this event exist, both of which are generally similar but there are some slight differences. The first account is from the Weilüe while the second is from the Book of Jin (Jin Shu).

The Weilüe account mentioned that Zhuge Liang planned to induce Meng Da to defect to Shu when he heard that Meng was feeling uneasy in Xincheng. Zhuge Liang wrote several letters to Meng Da and the latter replied. Shen Yi (申儀), the Administrator of Weixing (魏興; around present-day Shiquan County in Shaanxi and Yunxi County in Hubei), who had disagreements with Meng Da, secretly reported to the Wei imperial court that Meng was having dealings with Shu, but the Wei emperor Cao Rui refused to believe. Sima Yi, who was stationed at Wan at that time, sent an advisor Liang Ji (梁幾) to investigate and also urged him to travel to the capital Luoyang. Meng Da became suspicious and feared for his life, so he rebelled.

The Jin Shu account confirmed that Meng Da did have a feud with Shen Yi. Zhuge Liang planned to make use of this incident to lure Meng Da to defect to Shu sooner, so he sent Guo Mo (郭模) to feign surrender to Wei and divulge Meng's plan to Shen Yi. When Meng Da heard that the plot had been leaked out, he immediately made plans for a rebellion. Sima Yi, who was at Wan at that time, became worried that Meng Da would proceed with the revolt quickly, so he wrote a letter to Meng to calm him down. Sima Yi wrote, "General, you previously left Liu Bei and dedicated yourself to our state. Our state entrusted you with the duty of guarding the border and tasked you with planning an invasion on Shu. This is an obvious sign that our state trusts you. The people of Shu are fools and they hate you deeply. Zhuge Liang wants you back in Shu only because he has no other choice. What Guo Mo told Shen Yi is not a small issue. Why would Zhuge Liang so easily ask him to reveal your plot? This dangerous move is not difficult to comprehend." Meng Da was pleased when he received Sima Yi's letter, and he entered a dilemma on whether to rebel or not. During this time, Sima Yi secretly led his forces from Wan towards Xincheng. Sima Yi's subordinates suggested that they observe Meng Da's actions first before advancing, but Sima replied, "(Meng) Da is not a trustworthy person. Now that he is hesitating due to suspicions, we should seize this opportunity to get rid of him." Sima Yi's army then advanced quickly and reached Xincheng within eight days.

Shu Han and Eastern Wu also sent their forces to support Meng Da, which arrived at An Bridge (安橋) at Xicheng (西城) and Mulan Fort (木闌塞) respectively. Sima Yi despatched his subordinates to deal with Meng Da's reinforcements.

Before the battle, Meng Da wrote to Zhuge Liang, "Wan is 800 li away from Luoyang, while I'm 1,200 li away from Luoyang. When (Sima Yi) learns that I'm plotting a rebellion, he'll inform the emperor (Cao Rui). The total time taken for Sima Yi to send a letter to Luoyang and receive a response is around a month. By then my city is fortified and my army is ready. As I'm in an advantageous position, Sima Yi will not dare to come and attack me. Once you arrive I'll have no worries."

However, eight days later, when Sima Yi's army had arrived, Meng Da wrote to Zhuge Liang again, "I plotted a rebellion. Within eight days (Sima Yi)'s army has reached my city. What godspeed is that?" Meng Da was based in Shangyong (上庸), a city in Xincheng which was surrounded on three sides by water, so he set up wooden barriers to defend himself. Sima Yi's forces crossed the waters, destroyed the barriers, and arrived just outside Shangyong. Sima Yi then split up his army to attack Meng Da from eight directions. Sima Yi tempted Meng Da's nephew Deng Xian (鄧賢) and subordinate Li Fu (李輔) into surrendering, which they did so by opening Shangyong's gates after sixteen days of siege. Meng Da was captured and executed, and his head was sent to the Wei capital Luoyang.

== Aftermath ==
Sima Yi and his army captured over 10,000 prisoners-of-war and they returned to Wan.

Shen Yi (申儀) had been in Weixing for a long time and had been behaving arrogantly. He had several official seals carved and distributed without proper authorisation. When he heard of Meng Da's fate, he became apprehensive. Many other officials in the region presented Sima Yi with gifts and congratulated him on his victory. Sima Yi sent a messenger to taunt Shen Yi, so Shen came to meet Sima Yi, who questioned him about the distribution of unauthorised official seals but released him later.

Sima Yi also relocated the 7,000 households from Meng Da's territory to You Province in northern China. The Shu generals Yao Jing (姚靜), Zheng Ta (鄭他) and others led their men, numbering over 7,000, and surrendered to Wei. However, these Shu military officers who only appear in the Book of Jin did not appear in the 11th-century outstanding chronological historical text Zizhi Tongjian.

Sima Yi travelled to the capital Luoyang to meet the Wei emperor Cao Rui, who consulted him on how to counter invasions from Eastern Wu, and then ordered him to return to the garrison at Wan.

== In Romance of the Three Kingdoms ==
The rebellion was mentioned in Chapter 94 of the historical novel Romance of the Three Kingdoms, in which some fictitious elements were introduced for dramatic effect.

=== The novel's account ===
Meng Da invited Shen Yi (申儀), the Administrator of Jincheng (金城), and Shen Dan (申耽), the Administrator of Shangyong (上庸), to join him in the rebellion. Shen Yi and Shen Dan pretended to agree as they were secretly planning to help the Wei army when it arrived to suppress the revolt. They lied to Meng Da that the preparations were insufficient, and Meng believed them.

Sima Yi's messenger Liang Ji (梁畿) arrived at Xincheng and lied to Meng Da that Sima had led an army towards Chang'an to deal with an invasion by Shu Han. Meng Da was pleased and he threw a feast for Liang Ji and then saw Liang out of the city. He then gave orders to Shen Yi and Shen Dan to rebel on the following day. However, just then, he received reports that an army had arrived outside the city. Meng Da rushed to the city wall and saw that the army was commanded by Xu Huang, a veteran Wei general. Xu Huang called for Meng Da to surrender, but Meng fired an arrow which hit Xu in the forehead. Meng Da's archers then rained arrows on Xu Huang's men, forcing them to retreat. Xu Huang died from his arrow wound that night at the age of 59 (by East Asian age reckoning) and his body was placed in a coffin and sent to Luoyang for burial.

By then, Sima Yi's main army had shown up outside Xincheng and completely surrounded the city. The following day, Meng Da saw Shen Yi and Shen Dan's forces arriving and he thought that they had come to help him. He opened the gates and led his men out to attack Sima Yi, but Shen Yi and Shen Dan shouted at him, "You rebel, don't try to escape! Quickly accept your death!" Meng Da sensed trouble and attempted to retreat back into the city, but his subordinates Li Fu (李輔) and Deng Xian (鄧賢) had betrayed him and denied him entry. Shen Dan approached the exhausted Meng Da and killed him, and Meng's men surrendered.

Sima Yi entered Xincheng and restored peace and order to the city. He reported his victory to the Wei emperor Cao Rui, who asked for Meng Da's head to be sent to Luoyang. Shen Yi and Shen Dan were promoted and ordered to accompany Sima Yi to deal with the Shu invasion, while Li Fu and Deng Xian were tasked with guarding Xincheng and Shangyong.

=== Historicity ===
Historically, upon Meng Da's rebellion Shen Dan (申耽) was no longer an official and was not involved in the rebellion, and presumably he had already died. There is also no evidence that Xu Huang participated in suppressing the revolt. The Sanguozhi did not provide much details on his death. It simply stated that he died in the first year of the Taihe era (227–233) in the reign of Cao Rui.

== In popular culture ==
The rebellion is featured as a playable stage in the Koei video game Dynasty Warriors 5: Xtreme Legends, in which it is known as the "Battle of Xin Castle". The player can only play on the Wei side as Cao Pi, Sima Yi or Xu Huang, and must defeat Meng Da to win the stage. If the player is fast enough, the stage can be completed before Shu reinforcements arrive to help Meng Da.
