= Yan Peng =

Yan Peng may refer to:

- Yan Peng (basketball) (born 1996), Chinese basketball player
- Yan Peng (footballer) (born 1995), Chinese footballer

== See also ==
- Peng Yang (disambiguation)
