= Mi Zhu =

Chinese general and politician (c.165–221)

- 麋竺
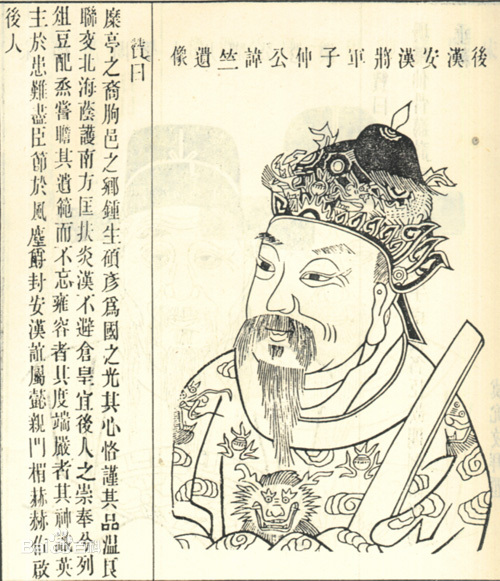
- An illustration of Mi Zhu

General Who Pacifies Han (安漢將軍) (under Liu Bei)
- In office 214 – 221
- Monarchs: Emperor Xian of Han / Liu Bei (from 219)

Assistant Officer of the Household (從事中郎) (under Liu Bei)
- In office 201 – 214
- Monarch: Emperor Xian of Han

Bieja (別駕) (under Tao Qian)
- In office ? – 194
- Monarch: Emperor Xian of Han

Personal details
- Born: c. 165; Lianyungang, Jiangsu
- Died: c. 221 – c. (aged 55-56)
- Relations: Mi Fang (brother); Lady Mi (sister); Liu Bei (brother-in-law)
- Children: Mi Wei
- Occupation: Official, adviser
- Courtesy name: Zizhong (子仲)

Mi Zhu (c. 165–221), courtesy name Zizhong, was a Chinese military general and politician who served under the warlord Liu Bei in the late Eastern Han dynasty, and briefly during the Three Kingdoms period after Liu Bei founded the state of Shu Han. He was also Liu Bei's brother-in-law, as his sister, Lady Mi, married Liu Bei. Mi Zhu was essential to Liu Bei during the defeats of the latter, financing Liu Bei's army in critical times where there was no tax base. Mi Zhu was extremely well educated and helped Liu Bei develop relationships with wealthy rivals such as Yuan Shao, Yuan Shu and Liu Biao. He was also the elder brother of Mi Fang, who served Liu Bei as well until his defection to Liu Bei's ally-turned-rival Sun Quan in 220. Mi Zhu served Liu Bei loyally for more than 25 years, as a high civil official of Liu during all the later's tenures as governor of Xu, Jing and Yi provinces, the former's ideas were regularly and widely circulated to the common people which greatly helped Liu Bei's political movement as Han loyalist and Confucian but, historians would argue it mere rhetoric as Liu ruled more in the tradition of legalism. Nonetheless, Mi along with Jian Yong, Sun Qian, and later Yi Ji, greatly contributed to the Liu's populist movement to restore the Han dynasty through literature and essays. Mi Zhu was thought to be Liu's best friend and most favored subject, he died of illness a little over a year after Liu Bei declared himself emperor.

== Life ==
Mi Zhu was born in Qu County (朐縣), Donghai Commandery (東海郡), which is present-day Lianyungang, Jiangsu. He was from an extremely rich family who have been merchants for generations. At his time, their number of servants and retainers was around 10 000 with wealth and riches in the hundreds of millions. According to In Search of the Supernatural (搜神記) by Gan Bao (干竇), a work largely consisting of legends and hearsays, Mi Zhu was once returning home from the capital Luoyang when he met a lady by the road. He gave her a lift out of kindness. When she alighted, she revealed that she was an emissary from Heaven on a mission to burn down Mi Zhu's house. However, to repay his kindness, she agreed to walk slowly so as to allow Mi Zhu the time to evacuate the house. A huge fire indeed broke out at noon as the lady promised.

Legends aside, Mi Zhu initially served under Tao Qian, the governor of Xu Province (present-day northern Jiangsu) as Bieja (別駕; important assistant to the governor of the province). Upon his death, Tao Qian told to Mi Zhu that he believed Liu Bei to be the only person able to bring peace back to the province of Xu therefore passed on the governorship to him over his sons with Mi Zhu leading the local families to his meeting at Xiaopei, Mi Zhu thereafter rendered his service to Liu Bei. In 196, while Liu Bei was leading an army to resist Yuan Shu's advance, Lü Bu betrayed him and seized control of Xiapi, the capital of Xu Province, seizeing Liu Bei's family, wife and children. He also proclaimed himself the governor. Henceforth, Liu Bei was forced into exile, forming a series of temporary alliances with different warlords, including Cao Cao, Yuan Shao and Liu Biao. Throughout this trough in Liu Bei's career, however, Mi Zhu stayed loyal.

Previously, when Liu Bei learned of Lu Bu's betrayal, he tried to lead his army back to Xiapi however with their home base cut off, the majority of his soldiers deserted along the way therefore he led the remnants of his army to Guangling. Furthermore, surrounded by the forces of both Lu Bu and Yuan Shu in now hostile territory. There were reported acts of cannibalism among Liu Bei's troops. To restore some stability among the army, Mi Zhu sponsored Liu Bei with his all of his family wealth recruiting among his personal retinue of servants while using his wealth and riches to pay the stipend of the soldiers. He also married his younger sister to the latter. Cao Cao had once attempted to entice Mi Zhu and Mi Fang to serve him by offering them governorships of Ying Commandery (northwest of present-day Laiwu, Shandong) and Pengcheng Commandery respectively but was turned down, and the brothers fled with Liu Bei.

The Gao Cong Ji recorded one of Cao Cao's memorials concerning Mi Zhu: “The Commandery of Taishan has wide and far borders which makes it hard to control. Moreover, it is since long infected by many bandits and brigands. Looking at the situation, it should be divided into five counties as Ying Commandery and have one known to be pure and incorruptible to defend and adjure it. The Lieutenant-General (偏將軍), Mi Zhu is naturally faithful and loyal and is reliable to command military and civil affairs; Hence I request to have him take office as Administrator of Yíng Commandery (嬴郡太守), to comfort the officials and people.”

When Liu Bei sought refuge with Liu Biao, he sent Mi Zhu first to meet and discuss with him. And for his effort in soothing the relation between them was appointed in his office as Assistant Officer of the Household (從事中郎). After Liu Bei conquered Yi Province (covering present-day Sichuan and Chongqing) in 214, Mi Zhu was promoted to General Who Pacifies Han (安漢將軍). Although Mi Zhu was known for his kindness and his grace; he was not given any troops to command, as military manoeuver were not his expertise, he was nonetheless the most highly esteemed among Liu Bei's subjects. He was viewed as a role model official for the state of Shu and many young civil officials looked up to him as they did to Zhuge Liang, Fa Zheng, Dong He and Xu Jing.

In 219, Mi Fang defected to Sun Quan when Sun's general Lü Meng launched a surprise attack on Jing Province (covering present-day Hubei and Hunan), which resulted in the death of Guan Yu. When he heard of this, Mi Zhu bound himself and came to Liu Bei, pleading guilty for his brother's crime. Liu Bei consoled him, further told him that the fault of a brother shouldn't reach another and treated him the same as before. However, Mi Zhu was so ashamed that he soon fell sick and died slightly more than a year later.

== Family ==
Aside from his younger brother and sister, Mi Zhu had a son Mi Wei (麋威), who reached the rank of General of the Household Rapid as Tigers (虎賁中郎將). While Mi Wei's son Mi Zhao (麋照), served as Custodian of Tiger Cavalry (虎騎監). From Mi Zhu to Mi Zhao, they were all talented for archery and riding, mastering mounted archery.

== Appraisal ==
Chen Shou, who wrote Mi Zhu's biography, commented as follows: "Mi Zhu, Sun Qian, Jian Yong and Yi Ji were refined and cultured persons whose ideas were widely circulated. They were well known for their good observation of the proprieties."

== See also ==
- Lists of people of the Three Kingdoms

== Notes ==
1. 麋竺 is often (mis)printed as 糜竺 in copies of the historical novel Romance of the Three Kingdoms in circulation.
