= Sun Qian =

Chinese diplomat, general and official (died c. 214)

- 孫乾
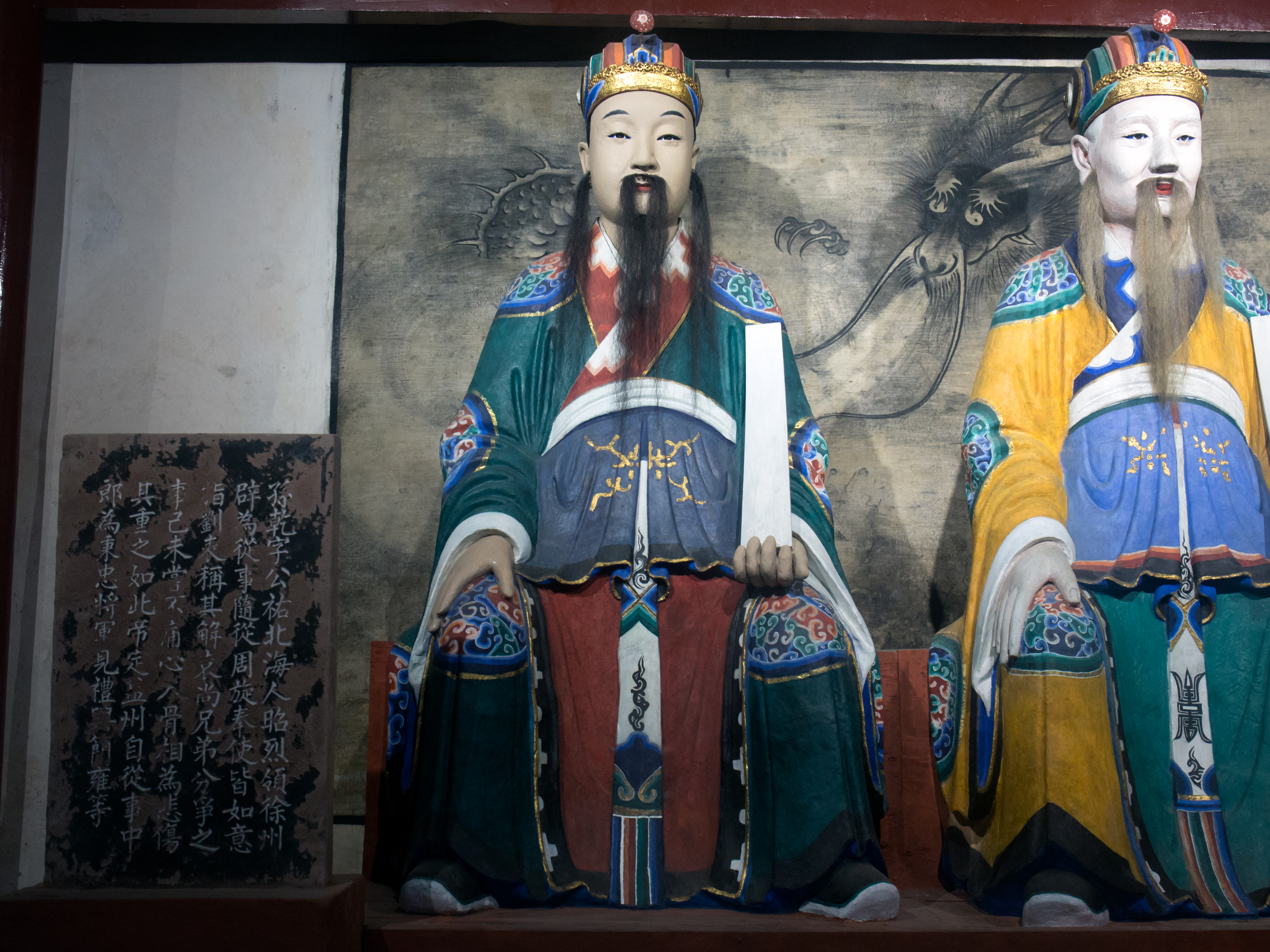
- Statue of Sun Qian in the Zhuge Liang Memorial Temple in Chengdu, Sichuan

General Who Upholds Loyalty (秉忠將軍) (under Liu Bei)
- In office 214
- Monarch: Emperor Xian of Han

Assistant Officer of the Household (從事中郎) (under Liu Bei)
- In office 201 – 214
- Monarch: Emperor Xian of Han

Assistant Officer (從事) (under Liu Bei)
- In office 194 – 201
- Monarch: Emperor Xian of Han

Personal details
- Born: Unknown Shouguang, Shandong
- Died: c. 214
- Occupation: Diplomat, politician
- Courtesy name: Gongyou (公祐)

Sun Qian (died c. 214), sometimes known as Sun Gan, courtesy name Gongyou, was a Chinese diplomat and official serving under the warlord Liu Bei in the late Eastern Han dynasty of China. His talent was noted by the scholar Zheng Xuan. Therefore, Liu Bei gave Sun Qian a position on his staff after he took Xu Province. Along with Jian Yong and Mi Zhu, Sun Qian frequently served as an ambassador for Liu Bei, most notably to Yuan Shao and Liu Biao. After Liu Bei took Yi Province, Sun Qian was promoted and held a rank equal to Jian Yong.

== Life ==
Sun Qian was born in Beihai Commandery, which is in present-day Shouguang, Shandong. He was recommended by the famed scholar Zheng Xuan, a fellow Beihai man, to serve under Liu Bei as an Assistant Officer (從事). When Liu Bei succeeded Tao Qian as the Governor (牧) of Xu Province in 194, an act said to have further added to Zheng Xuan's considerable reputation. He remained as a subordinate of Liu Bei from then on.

In 199, when Liu Bei reestablished himself in Xu and extricate free of Cao Cao's control, he sent Sun Qian to Cao Cao's major rival to the north Yuan Shao to seek support. Events would not go Liu Bei, or Yuan Shao's way during the resulting campaign and in 201 Liu Bei had to abandon his position in Runan Commandery as Cao Cao arrived after defeating Yuan Shao. Liu Bei sent Sun Qian and Mi Zhu to the governor of Jing Province Liu Biao to successfully arrange refuge.

Yuan Shao died in 202 but leave a disputed succession that saw his sons turn on each other, Liu Biao wrote to Yuan Shao's third son and successor, Yuan Shang, and mentioned the rivalry between Yuan Shang and his eldest brother Yuan Tan. Liu Biao wrote: "Whenever I discussed this issue (the rivalry between you and your brother) with General Liu (Liu Bei) and Sun Gongyou (a.k.a. Sun Qian), I feel very upset and heartbroken." Both Liu Bei and Liu Biao highly regarded Sun Qian.

In 214, after Liu Bei had successfully seized control of Yi Province (covering present-day Sichuan and Chongqing) from its governor Liu Zhang and established his new base in Chengdu (Yi Province's capital), he promoted Sun Qian to General Who Upholds Loyalty (秉忠將軍). Liu Bei's treatment towards Sun Qian was equal to that of close aids Mi Zhu and Jian Yong but Sun Qian died not long after this promotion.

== Appraisal ==
Chen Shou, who wrote Sun Qian's biography, commented that: "Mi Zhu, Sun Qian, Jian Yong and Yi Ji were refined and cultured persons whose ideas were widely circulated. They were well known for their good observations of the proprieties."

== In Records In Plain Language ==
Only appears once, helping raise volunteer troops for Liu Bei against the Yellow Turbans.

== In Romance of the Three Kingdoms ==
Recommended by Tao Qian, on his death bed, to Liu Bei to assist the reluctant Liu Bei in running Xu. Warns Liu Bei, as he prepares to fight the invading Yuan Shu, that a trusted man needs to be in charge of Xiapi but Liu Bei's choice of Zhang Fei would end poorly with Xu falling into the hands of Lü Bu. In 196 recommends, to Zhang Fei's annoyance, seeking Lü Bu's help against another invasion from Yuan Shu, Liu Bei sends a letter and help arrives. When Liu Bei is attacked by the erratic warlord Lü Bu, recommends seeking help from Cao Cao and is assigned defense of Xiaopei's north gate, manages to escape when city falls and advises Liu Bei to seek refuge with Cao Cao.

When Liu Bei rises in Xu against Cao Cao, acts as envoy to Yuan Shao and advises Liu Bei on how to set out defenses against Cao Cao. When the expected attack came, sent to seek help from Yuan Shao but Yuan Shao is in despair over his youngest Yuan Shang being unwell so makes no move, left in charge of Xiaopei but Xu falls to Cao Cao and Liu Bei's forces scatter. Sun Qian ends up in Runan where the Turbans Liu Pi and Gong Du take him in, acts as a spy on incoming Cao Cao force but is captured and taken to Guan Yu with both men rather surprised to see each other in these circumstances. Informs Guan Yu that Liu Bei is with Yuan Shao, arranges Gong Du and Liu Pi to fake defeat to Guan Yu. When Guan Yu leaves and they retake Runan, sent to Yuan Shao to seek support, Yuan Shao sends Liu Bei but Sun Qian is not impressed by the divided state of Yuan Shao's camp and is sent by Liu Bei to warn Guan Yu not to go to Yuan Shao. Accompanies Guan Yu on his journey away from Cao Cao, helping guard Liu Bei's wives Lady Gan and Mi. When they find out Zhang Fei has established himself in Gucheng, Sun Qian goes to tell Zhang Fei and is rather surprised by Zhang Fei's response to arm himself and seek a fight with Guan Yu. Once Zhang Fei is calmed down, via the slaying of Cai Yang, Sun Qian goes with Guan Yu to Runan to see Liu Bei then Sun Qian goes north to see Liu Bei who had gone to talk to Yuan Shao.

Liu Bei is reunited with his officers and his family but in 201 is driven out of Runan by Cao Cao's forces. Comforts a despairing Liu Bei that fortunes can turn and he could go to his well placed kinsman Liu Biao. Sent as envoy, he praises Liu Bei as a Han loyalist and hero in need of support and that Liu Bei, a kinsman famed for his courtesy, was where Sun Qian had advised Liu Bei to go rather than Sun Quan. Is met by strong objections by Cai Mao who is wary of Liu Bei's track record with other lords and that inviting Liu Bei would invite an attack from Cao Cao so suggests executing Sun Qian as a signal. Sun Qian says he is prepared to die for his lord and accuses Cai Mao of slander of a virtuous man, Liu Biao sides with Sun Qian and invites Liu Bei.

After an attempt by Cai Mao to kill Liu Bei, it is Sun Qian who spots Liu Bei has been out of sorts and suspects some plot occurs, inquiries as to what has happened so Liu Bei reveals all. After another plot by Cai Mao at a festival, sent to bear a letter setting out what Cai Mao had done, argues against execution of the powerful Cai Mao for fear it would make Liu Bei's life difficult in Jing. Concerned when Liu Bei's first strategist Xu Shu is going to Cao Cao, due to mother being at court, as Xu Shu's knows their secrets so suggests forcing Xu Shu to stay so the mother will be killed and Xu Shu would desire revenge on Cao Cao, Liu Bei refuses.

During the flight at Changban Sun Qian is tasked with overseeing the evacuation of the populace that had chosen to follow Liu Bei then sent with Guan Yu and an escort to deliver message to Liu Biao's eldest son Liu Qi seeking help which duly arrives. After the allied victory at Chibi, sent to the victorious Eastern Wu commander Zhou Yu to congratulate him and bring presents but Zhou Yu is able to learn from him where Liu Bei is positioned and anticipates Liu Bei is planning to take Nanjun which Zhou Yu also has an eye on. When Zhou Yu seeks to inveigle Liu Bei into a trap by arranging a marriage, Sun Qian is chosen as the envoy from Liu Bei's side and tries to reassure Liu Bei that rival ruler Sun Quan's intent is genuine (it was not), later pushes through the marriage as an early date as he can arrange to prevent mishaps and schemes.

Zhang Fei is sent to investigate news of Pang Tong getting drunk as head of Leiyang, Liu Bei also sends Sun Qian to act as a cooler head, Sun Qian persuading Zhang Fei to look deeper into the matter rather than just dismissing Pang Tong. Zhang Fei is won over when Pang Tong sorts out a hundred days of neglected work by mid-day and thanks Sun Qian for preventing a loss of such a talent. During the conquest of Yi, Liu Bei admires Ma Chao who had been sent by the theocratic warlord of Hanzhong Zhang Lu to help Liu Zhang, so Zhuge Liang sends Sun Qian. First to bribe the corrupt adviser Yang Song to get an audience then persuade Zhang Lu to order Ma Chao to stand down in exchange for backing Zhang Lu's claim to be Prince of Hanzhong. Ma Chao's refusal to obey the order to stand down leads to a split between Zhang Lu and Ma Chao with the latter alienated enough to soon join Liu Bei.

== See also ==
- Lists of people of the Three Kingdoms
