= Du Wei (Three Kingdoms) =

Early 3rd century Shu Han state official

- 杜微

Counsellor Remonstrant (諫議大夫)
- In office 224 – ?
- Monarch: Liu Shan
- Preceded by: Zhuge Liang

Personal details
- Born: Unknown Mianyang, Sichuan
- Died: Unknown
- Occupation: Official
- Courtesy name: Guofu (國輔)

Du Wei (fl. 190s – 220s), courtesy name Guofu, was a scholar who rejected service, including via faking of poor health, before eventually becoming an official of the state of Shu Han during the Three Kingdoms period of China.

== Life ==
Du Wei was from Fu County (涪縣), Zitong Commandery (梓潼郡), which is in present-day Mianyang, Sichuan. He was born sometime in the mid- or late Eastern Han dynasty. In his younger days, he studied under the tutelage of Ren An (任安; 124–202), a famous scholar and polymath and like his master would be a scholar recluse. Liu Zhang, the Governor of Yi Province (covering present-day Sichuan and Chongqing), heard about Du Wei and offered him the position of an Assistant Officer (從事) in the provincial government. However, Du Wei claimed that he was ill and declined the offer. In 214, after the warlord Liu Bei seized control of Yi Province from Liu Zhang, he wanted to recruit Du Wei to serve in his administration. Du Wei claimed that he could not serve because he was deaf, and stayed at home.

In 224, Zhuge Liang, the Imperial Chancellor of the state of Shu Han in the Three Kingdoms period, was actively searching for talented and virtuous people to serve in the Shu government. Among the candidates he selected, he appointed Qin Mi as an Assistant Officer (別駕), Wu Liang (五梁) (Note: Wu Liang (五梁), whose courtesy name was Deshan (德山), was from Nan'an County (南安縣), Qianwei Commandery (犍為郡), which is in present-day Leshan, Sichuan. He was known for being well-versed in Confucian studies and for his virtuous character. He started serving as a Consultant (議郎) in the Shu government before being promoted to Counsellor Remonstrant (諫議大夫) and later General of the Household for All Purposes (五官中郎將).) as an Officer of Merit (功曹), and Du Wei as a Registrar (主簿).

When Du Wei declined again, Zhuge Liang sent a carriage to his residence to fetch him to the office. Upon Du Wei's arrival, Zhuge Liang came out to welcome him in person. Du Wei thanked Zhuge Liang for the offer but did not accept. As Zhuge Liang heard that Du Wei was deaf, he wrote a note beforehand and passed it to Du Wei when he showed up. The note read:

"I have heard of your virtuous character and have longed to meet you. However, as the pure do not interact with the impure, I never had the chance to consult you in person. Wang Yuantai, Li Boren, Wang Wenyi, Yang Jixiu, Ding Jungan, Li Yongnan and his brother(s), Wen Zhongbao and others have long admired you for your lofty character but never had the chance to meet you. Although I have been tasked with the important responsibility of governing this province, I am so untalented and lacking in virtue that I constantly worry about being unable to perform my role well. His Majesty has just turned 18 this year. He is kind, loving and intelligent. He appreciates people of virtuous character and treats them with respect. Everyone misses the days of the Han Empire and hopes that you will follow the will of Heaven and the people, serve our wise Emperor, assist him in rebuilding the Han Empire, and leave your good name in history. As the wise do not work with the foolish, you decided to remain in seclusion. You have been working hard at home and refusing to degrade yourself."

After reading the note, Du Wei tried to turn down the offer once more, claiming that he was old and feeble and therefore unfit to serve. Zhuge Liang, given his strong admiration for Du Wei, refused to give up, so he produced another note and showed Du Wei. It read:

Cao Pi committed regicide, usurped the throne, and declared himself Emperor. His legitimacy is like a dragon made from mud and a dog made from straw. I hope to work together with people of virtue and talent to destroy the evil and pretentious Cao Pi in the name of righteousness. As you do not want to assist and advise me, and instead choose to return to the countryside, my wish cannot be fulfilled. Cao Pi has led his armies to attack the Wu and Chu lands. As he is currently so busy with many things, our State should use the opportunity to secure our borders, promote agriculture, educate the people, and train the troops. After Cao Pi gets defeated in his battles against Wu, we shall seize the chance to attack Wei and pacify the Empire with minimal efforts and losses. You should put your talents and virtues to good use by serving in the government. I am not asking you to participate in military affairs. Why are you so quick to reject me and leave?

When Du Wei finally relented and agreed to serve in the Shu government, Zhuge Liang appointed him as a Counsellor Remonstrant (諫議大夫) but Du Wei would retire on grounds of health and age.

Chen Shou used Zhuge Liang's recruitment efforts as an example of the regard in which Du Wei was held and noted Du Wei as a man who cultivated his virtue in reclusion, like the ideals of old. J. Michael Farmer notes Chen Shou placing Du Wei as part of a continuation of local intellectual tradition that Chen Shou himself was part of.

== See also ==
- Lists of people of the Three Kingdoms
