= Peng Yang =

Peng Yang may refer to:

- Peng Yang (Han dynasty) (178–214), Chinese official of the Eastern Han dynasty
- Peng Yang (field hockey) (born 1992), Chinese field hockey player
- Pengyang County in Ningxia, China
