= Meng Da =

General who served under Liu Zhang, Liu Bei and Cao Wei (died 228)

- 孟達
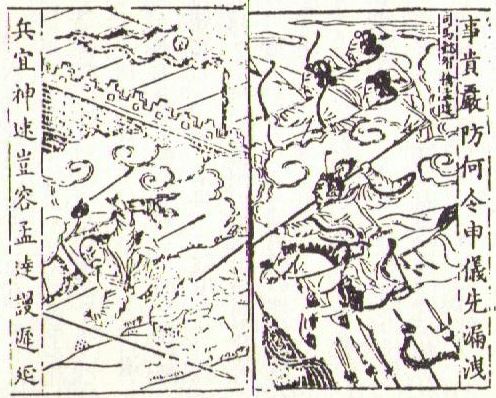
- A Qing dynasty illustration of Meng Da's death

Administrator of Xincheng (新城太守)
- In office ? – 228
- Monarch: Cao Pi / Cao Rui

General Who Builds Martial Might (建武將軍)
- In office 220 – ?
- Monarch: Cao Pi

Regular Mounted Attendant (散騎常侍)
- In office 220 – ?
- Monarch: Cao Pi

Administrator of Yidu (宜都太守) (under Liu Bei)
- In office 214 – 219
- Monarch: Emperor Xian of Han

Personal details
- Born: Unknown Xingping, Shaanxi
- Died: 228 Fang County, Hubei
- Occupation: General
- Courtesy name: Zijing (子敬) / Zidu (子度)
- Peerage: Marquis of Pingyang Village (平陽亭侯)

Meng Da (died c. March 228), courtesy name Zidu, (Note: This is based on Liu Feng's lament that he regretted not listening to Meng Da.) was a military general of the state of Cao Wei during the early Three Kingdoms period of China. He previously served the warlords Liu Zhang and Liu Bei during the late Eastern Han dynasty before defecting to Wei. In Wei, he served under the first two rulers, Cao Pi and Cao Rui. Around late 227, he started a rebellion in Wei and aimed to rejoin the Shu-Han but the revolt was swiftly suppressed by the Wei general Sima Yi. Meng Da was captured and executed for treason.

== Background ==
Meng Da was a son of Meng Ta (孟他; fl.150-170), who was Inspector of Liang province during the reign of Emperor Ling of Han. (Note: Pei Songzhi cited an annotation from Sanfu Juelu (三辅决录) in his annotation of Cao Rui's biography in Sanguozhi; said annotation was a short biography of Meng Ta. In Book of the Later Han and Zizhi Tongjian, Meng's name was recorded as "Tuo" (佗); Zhang Rang's biography in Book recorded how Meng bribed Zhang in order to obtain the post of Inspector of Liang province; this record is similar to Pei's annotation in Sanguozhi. Vol.78 of Book and vol.56 of Tongjian recorded that as Inspector, Meng sent 500 soldiers from Dunhuang as part of an expedition against Shule in 170.)

== Service under Liu Zhang and Liu Bei ==
In the early Jian'an era (196–220) of the reign of Emperor Xian of Han, when famines broke out, Meng Da and his friend Fa Zheng (who was from the same commandery) travelled to Yi Province (covering present-day Sichuan and Chongqing) to join the provincial governor, Liu Zhang. Meng defected to another warlord, Liu Bei, when the latter invaded Yi Province in the early 210s and seized control of the province from Liu Zhang. Liu Bei sent Meng Da to guard Jiangling (江陵), and promoted him to Administrator (太守) of Yidu (宜都) later after settling Yi Province. Meng Da's original courtesy name was "Zijing", but he changed it to "Zidu" to avoid naming taboo because "Zijing" was also the courtesy name of Liu Bei's uncle.

In 219, Meng Da was ordered to lead a force from Zigui (秭歸) to attack Fangling (房陵); while at Fangling, Meng killed its Administrator Kuai Qi (蒯祺). After conquering Fangling, Meng Da advanced further north and captured another city, Shangyong (上庸), where he rendezvoused with Liu Feng, Liu Bei's adoptive son. Later that year, when Liu Bei's general Guan Yu was trapped by enemy forces in Jing Province, Guan requested reinforcements from Liu Feng and Meng Da, but they refused. Guan Yu was eventually captured by forces of the eastern warlord Sun Quan and was executed.

== Defection to Wei ==
Meng Da was afraid that he would be punished for refusing to help Guan Yu. At the time, his relationship with Liu Feng was also strained. Hence, in c.late August 220, he brought 4,000 soldiers with him and defected to Liu Bei's rival Cao Pi, who gave him a warm welcome. Meng Da then wrote a letter to Liu Feng, informing the latter that he was in grave danger, because someone close to Liu Bei had spoken ill of him, and he urged Liu Feng to surrender to Wei as well. However, Liu Feng ignored Meng Da's advice and returned to Chengdu, where he was executed by his adoptive father for failing to reinforce Guan Yu and failing to stop Meng Da from defecting.

Cao Pi later ended the Eastern Han dynasty by forcing Emperor Xian to abdicate the throne to him, after which he assumed the title of emperor and established the state of Cao Wei, marking the start of the Three Kingdoms period. In Wei, Meng Da received various important appointments and the title of a marquis. Cao Pi merged the three commanderies of Fangling, Shangyong and Xicheng (西城) to form a larger commandery, Xincheng (新城), and he appointed Meng Da as the Administrator (太守) of Xincheng and tasked him with defending Wei's southwestern border. Liu Ye advised Cao Pi, "Meng Da is always looking out for rewards which are not rightfully his, and he is prone to schemes due to his talent. Thus, he will not be grateful to Your Excellency. Xincheng borders Sun Quan's and Liu Bei's territories. If the regional situation changes, it will create troubles for the realm."; Cao Pi ignored Liu. Meng Da became close friends with the Wei officials Huan Jie and Xiahou Shang.

In 225, Li Hong (李鴻), a former Wei subject who surrendered to Shu Han (a state founded by Liu Bei), came to meet Shu's chancellor Zhuge Liang and the Shu officials Jiang Wan and Fei Shi. Li Hong told them about Meng Da's meeting with a person called Wang Chong (王沖), who told him that Zhuge Liang urged Liu Bei to execute Meng Da's family after Meng defected to Wei, but Liu Bei refused. Meng Da also did not believe Wang Chong.

== Rebellion and death ==
Zhuge Liang attempted to contact Meng Da and induce him to defect back to Shu, despite objection from Fei Shi, who remarked that Meng Da was an untrustworthy traitor. By then, the Wei emperor Cao Pi had died and was succeeded by Cao Rui, who treated Meng Da less favourably. Meng Da's close friends Huan Jie and Xiahou Shang had also died, so Meng Da felt isolated and became increasingly disgruntled with the Wei imperial court. After some exchanging of letters between Zhuge Liang and Meng Da, the latter gradually developed animosity towards Wei and harboured the intention of starting a rebellion.

In 228, Zhuge Liang launched the first of a series of Northern Expeditions against Wei, and he succeeded in persuading Meng Da to assist the Shu army by rebelling against Wei. However, Meng Da's rebellion plot was leaked out by Shen Yi (申儀), the Administrator of Weixing (魏興), whom Meng Da had a feud with. The Wei general Sima Yi wrote letters to Meng Da to put the latter in a dilemma on whether to rebel or not, and secretly led an army from Wan (in present-day Nanyang, Henan) to attack Meng Da's base in Xincheng. Sima Yi's forces arrived at Xincheng in just eight days and caught Meng Da completely off guard. Meng Da was betrayed by his nephew Deng Xian (鄧賢) and subordinate Li Fu (李輔) and his rebellion was swiftly suppressed. He was captured and executed by Sima Yi.

== In Romance of the Three Kingdoms ==
Meng Da appeared as a character in the 14th-century historical novel Romance of the Three Kingdoms. His courtesy name in the novel is "Ziqing" (子庆; 子慶; Zǐqìng). His role in the novel is mainly centred on the events in the Xincheng Rebellion.

== See also ==
- Lists of people of the Three Kingdoms
