= Liao Li =

3rd-century Chinese Shu Han official

- 廖立

Changshui Colonel (長水校尉)
- In office 223 – ?
- Monarch: Liu Shan
- Chancellor: Zhuge Liang

Palace Attendant (侍中)
- In office 219 – 223
- Monarch: Liu Bei

Administrator of Ba Commandery (巴郡太守)
- In office c. 215 – 219

Administrator of Changsha (長沙太守)
- In office 209 – 215

Personal details
- Born: Unknown Changde, Hunan
- Died: Unknown Mao County, Sichuan
- Occupation: Official
- Courtesy name: Gongyuan (公淵)

Liao Li (fl. 209–234), courtesy name Gongyuan, was an official of the state of Shu Han during the Three Kingdoms period of China.

== Service under Liu Bei ==
Liao Li was from Linyuan County (臨沅縣), Wuling Commandery (武陵郡), which is located within present-day Changde, Hunan. He started his career under the warlord Liu Bei around 209 after Liu Bei succeeded Liu Qi as the Governor of Jing Province. Liu Bei employed Liao Li, who was then below the age of 30, as an assistant officer (從事) and later appointed him as the Administrator of Changsha Commandery.

In 211, when Liu Bei led his troops to Yi Province (covering present-day Sichuan and Chongqing), he left his chief adviser Zhuge Liang behind to take charge of his territories in Jing Province during his absence. During this time, Liu Bei's ally Sun Quan sent a representative to meet Zhuge Liang and ask him to recommend scholar-officials who were well-versed in managing a state. Zhuge Liang replied: "Pang Tong and Liao Li are talents from Jing Province. They are capable of assisting me in governing a state."

In 215, when tensions ran high between Liu Bei and Sun Quan over a territorial dispute in Jing Province, Sun Quan ordered his general Lü Meng to lead troops to seize three commanderies in southern Jing Province. During this time, Liao Li abandoned his post at Changsha Commandery and fled west to Chengdu, the capital of Yi Province, to join Liu Bei. As Liu Bei highly regarded Liao Li, he did not blame him for losing Changsha and instead reassigned him to serve as the Administrator of Ba Commandery (巴郡; covering parts of present-day Chongqing).

In 219, after Liu Bei seized control of Hanzhong Commandery and declared himself King of Hanzhong, he appointed Liao Li as a Palace Attendant (侍中).

== Service under Liu Shan ==
Following Liu Bei's death in 223, his son Liu Shan succeeded him as the next emperor of the state of Shu. After his coronation, Liu Shan appointed Liao Li as a Changshui Colonel (長水校尉).

Liao Li had all along thought highly of himself and believed that he was on par with Zhuge Liang, the Imperial Chancellor of Shu, in terms of talent and fame. However, after he realised that his status in the Shu government was actually lower than that of the general Li Yan and others, he became very unhappy.

=== Defamation incident ===
On one occasion, when Zhuge Liang's assistants Li Shao and Jiang Wan came to discuss something with him, he told them:

"The army is about to embark on a campaign in distant lands. You, gentlemen, are experts in planning and strategy. In the past, the Late Emperor chose to fight with Wu for control over three southern commanderies instead of conquering Hanzhong. In the end, he still lost the three commanderies to Wu. It was a huge waste of the time and efforts of our troops. When Hanzhong fell, he allowed Xiahou Yuan and Zhang He to intrude into Yi Province and nearly lost control of the entire province. Even after he conquered Hanzhong, he failed to retrieve Marquis Guan's remains, and lost Shangyong to the enemy. Guan Yu thought too highly of himself despite being an incompetent military leader; he was also too headstrong and reckless. That was why we lost battles and entire armies. People like Xiang Lang and Wen Gong are of a mediocre class. Wen Gong is clueless about his role as a staff officer. In the past, Xiang Lang admired Ma Liang and his brothers so much that he compared them to sages. Now that he has become Chief Clerk, all he does is try to smooth things over between people. Guo Yanchang blindly follows others. He doesn't have what it takes to do great things, yet he became a Palace Attendant. Now that Shu is in decline, I don't think it is appropriate to allow these three persons to hold such important responsibilities. Wang Lian is low-class, greedy and corrupt. If he gains power, he will bring much suffering to the people. That is how we ended up in this situation."

Li Shao and Jiang Wan reported Liao Li to Zhuge Liang, who then wrote a memorial to the emperor Liu Shan as follows:

"Changshui Colonel Liao Li is egoistic and arrogant. He made negative criticisms of key officials and openly accused the State of putting mediocre persons instead of wise and talented persons in important positions. He also said that our military leaders are little brats. He has defamed the Late Emperor and slandered our officials. When someone said that our army is well-trained and its units are clearly defined, Liao Li, with a haughty expression on his face, angrily replied: 'That is not worthy of mention!' That was not the only time he said something like this. If even a single sheep can cause its flock to go astray, how can we be sure that a person like Liao Li, who occupies a high government office, will not mislead and confuse the rest of society?"

Zhuge Liang also wrote:

"When Liao Li was serving the Late Emperor, he was neither loyal nor filial. When he was supposed to be guarding Changsha, he left its gates open to the enemy. When he was serving in Ba Commandery, he engaged in suspicious activities. When he was serving under the General-in-Chief, he slandered and defamed people. When he was keeping vigil at the Late Emperor's funeral, he beheaded someone near the Late Emperor's casket. After Your Majesty ascended the throne, you appointed officials to key positions in the government. When Liao Li learnt that he had been given a military appointment, he told me: 'How am I a good fit for the military? Why am I given a position among the Five Colonels instead of the Ministers?' I told him: 'You hold an important position as a deputy to a General. As to why you aren't made a Minister, look at Li Yan. He also didn't get appointed as a Minister. You are a good fit for the Five Colonels.' Liao Li became very resentful and dissatisfied from then on."

== Downfall and exile ==
The Shu emperor Liu Shan issued an edict as follows:

"When the Miao rebelled, they were punished by exile. Liao Li is delusional and confused. I cannot bear to execute him so I hereby exile him to a remote location."

Liao Li was removed from office and reduced to the status of a commoner. He and his family were exiled to Wenshan Commandery (汶山郡; around present-day Mao County, Sichuan), where they lived as peasants and sustained themselves by farming. In 234, when he received news of Zhuge Liang's death, he shed tears and cried: "I now have to live the rest of my life like a zuoren!" (Note: Zuoren (左袵) refers to a style of dressing common among non-Han Chinese minorities in ancient China. In ancient China, it could also metaphorically refer to a "barbarian" (i.e. a member of an ethnic minority).)

Some years later, when the Shu general Jiang Wei passed by Wenshan Commandery, he visited Liao Li and saw that the latter was still the proud and ambitious man he was, and that he remained calm and composed when he spoke. Liao Li died in an unknown year in Wenshan. After his death, his wife and children were pardoned and allowed to return to the Shu capital Chengdu.

== See also ==
- Lists of people of the Three Kingdoms
