= Fei Li (Shu Han) =

Shu Han official and scholar (died 311)

- 費立

Cavalier Attendant-in-Ordinary (散騎常侍)
- In office ?–?
- Monarch: Sima Yan

Master of Writing (尚書)
- In office ?–?
- Monarch: Sima Yan

Chief Controller (都督)
- In office ?–?
- Monarch: Sima Yan

Prefect of Chengdu (成都令)
- In office ?–?
- Monarch: Liu Shan

Commandant of the State (國中尉)
- In office ?–?
- Monarch: Liu Shan

Personal details
- Born: Unknown Leshan, Sichuan
- Died: 311 Luoyang
- Parent: Fei Shi (father)
- Occupation: Official, scholar
- Courtesy name: Jianxi (建熙)
- Peerage: Secondary Marquis (關內侯)

Fei Li (died 311), courtesy name Jianxi, was an official and scholar of the state of Shu Han in the Three Kingdoms period of China. After the fall of Shu in 263, he continued serving under the Cao Wei state, then the succeeding Jin dynasty in 266.

== Life ==
Fei Li was born in Nan'an County, Qianwei Commandery (犍為郡), which is present-day Leshan, Sichuan. His father was Fei Shi. Fei Li was known for his modest nature, to follow the principles of righteousness and his quiet and profound demeanour. He was nominated as a xiaolian (civil service candidate) and later served as Commandant of the State (國中尉). When Liu Shan was young, he was fond of leisurely excursions. Fei Li often sternly advised and corrected him. He also submitted written admonitions that were filled with righteous and forceful words in the form of moral instructions. Fei Li was then appointed as the Prefect of Chengdu (成都令), a county known for its difficulty to govern. However, he achieved great accomplishments in his position.

With his fair and upright character, he was promoted to the position of zhongzheng (中正; Impartial and Just) of the State. He was later appointed as the Administrator of Ba Commandery (巴西太守) but did not take up the post. Instead, he was transferred as the Chief Controller (都督) of the three provinces of Liang, Yi, and Ning, (Note: Nanzhong was also called Ningzhou or Ning Province (寧州).) and also served as the Master of Writing (尚書). When the imperial court moved to Chang'an, Fei Li often stayed in Luoyang with the other high-ranking ministers. He was promoted to the position of Cavalier Attendant-in-Ordinary (散騎常侍) and was enfeoffed as a Secondary Marquis (關內侯).

In his position, Fei Li would evaluate the people of the three provinces making commendations and criticisms according to their merits. He was impartial and fair hence commanding respect and fear from all. However, those who were dishonest often resented his strict adherence to the rules. He declined several governorships, having his sights set on the regions of He (河), Tai (泰), Ru (汝), and Ying (久). After some time, the imperial court considered appointing him as the Inspector of Jing province. In 311, during the Disaster of Yongjia, Fei Li and his son both perished at the hands of Han-Zhao's army. After his death, most of the famous officials from Yi province with the surname Fei (費) were his descendants.

== Appraisal ==
Chang Qu, who wrote Fei Li's biography in the Chronicles of Huayang (Huayang Guo Zhi), (Note: Fei Li's biography is recorded in the eleventh volume of the Huayang Guo Zhi, titled Biographies of later worthies (後賢志), covering the lives of notable persons from the Sichuan region who lived during the Jin dynasty.) appraised Fei Li as follows: "Standard of restrain, leave a legacy of justice."

== Lü Shu ==
Around the same time as Fei Li, there was another notable figure named Lü Shu (呂淑), whose courtesy name was Weide (偉德), who was known for his integrity. He was summoned to serve in the government and was recommended as a xiucai (秀才; person who passed the county level imperial exam). He held various positions such as Gentleman of the Masters of Writing (尚書郎) Inner Clerk (內史) of Qin state (秦國), the Colonel (校尉) of Changshui (長水), Cavalier Attendant-in-Ordinary (員外常侍) and Chief Controller (都督). Like Fei Li, Lü Shu also perished during the Disaster of Yongjia.

== See also ==
- Lists of people of the Three Kingdoms
