= Wang Lian =

Chinese Shu Han state official (died c. 223)

- 王連

Chief Clerk of the Imperial Chancellor (丞相長史)
- In office ?–?
- Monarch: Liu Shan
- Chancellor: Zhuge Liang
- Succeeded by: Xiang Lang

Colonel of the Garrison Cavalry (屯騎校尉)
- In office 223 – ?
- Monarch: Liu Shan
- Chancellor: Zhuge Liang

General of Revival (興業將軍)
- In office ?–?

Administrator of Shu Commandery (蜀郡太守)
- In office ?–?

Colonel of the Salt Office (司鹽校尉)
- In office ?–?

Prefect of Guangdu (廣都令)
- In office ?–?

Prefect of Shifang (什邡令)
- In office 214 or after – ?

Prefect of Zitong (梓潼令)
- In office ? – 214

Personal details
- Born: Unknown Nanyang, Henan
- Died: c. 223
- Children: Wang Shan
- Occupation: Official
- Courtesy name: Wenyi (文儀)
- Peerage: Marquis of Pingyang Village (平陽亭侯)

Wang Lian (died c. 223), courtesy name Wenyi, was an official of the Yi province warlord Liu Zhang. After refusing to submit to invasion, Wang rose to become a senior officer of Shu Han in the Three Kingdoms period of China. He was trusted with the salt monopoly by the regime, and a noted finder of talent.

== Life ==
Wang Lian was from Nanyang Commandery (南陽郡), which is around present-day Nanyang, Henan. He entered Yi Province (covering present-day Sichuan and Chongqing) sometime between 194 and 213 in the late Eastern Han dynasty, when warlord Liu Zhang was the Governor of Yi Province. He served as the Prefect (令) of Zitong County under Liu Zhang during this time.

Between 212 and 214, the warlord Liu Bei engaged Liu Zhang in a war for control of Yi Province. When Liu Bei's forces attacked Zitong County, Wang Lian ordered his troops to hide behind the city walls and close the gates, and refused to surrender to Liu Bei. Liu Bei admired Wang Lian for his loyalty towards Liu Zhang, so he called off the attack on Zitong County.

In 214, after Liu Bei successfully conquered Yi Province, he recruited many of Liu Zhang's former subordinates to serve in his administration. During this time, he appointed Wang Lian as the Prefect of Shifang County and later reassigned him to be the Prefect of Guangdu County (廣都縣; northeast of present-day Shuangliu District, Chengdu, Sichuan). Wang Lian performed well in office and was later promoted to Colonel of the Salt Office (司鹽校尉) to oversee and regulate the production and trade of salt and iron. Under Wang Lian's leadership, the Salt Office gained a lot of revenue for Liu Bei's administration through profits and taxes. At the same time, Wang Lian also identified some of his subordinates with great potential, such as Lü Yi, Du Qi (杜祺) and Liu Gan (劉幹), and promoted them or recommended them to serve in higher positions. He was later given additional appointments as the Administrator (太守) of Shu Commandery (蜀郡; centred around present-day Chengdu, Sichuan) and General of Revival (興業將軍) while remaining in charge of the salt office.

In 223, after Liu Shan became the emperor of the Shu Han state, Wang Lian was appointed as a Colonel of the Garrison Cavalry (屯騎校尉) and as the Chief Clerk (長史) of Zhuge Liang, the Imperial Chancellor (丞相), becoming a senior assistant to the most powerful official in the kingdom. He was also enfeoffed as the Marquis of Pingyang Village (平陽亭侯). When Zhuge Liang tried to recruit the recluse scholar Du Wei in 224, Wang Lian was one of the figures name-dropped by the Chancellor as an admirer of Du Wei. When Liao Li resented holding low office, one of the senior figures he criticized as unworthy, in comparison to himself, was Wang Lian whose character he questioned and complained the people were suffering under excessive demands.

Sometime between 223 and 224, when rebellions broke out in the Nanzhong region of southern Shu, Zhuge Liang wanted to personally lead the Shu army on a campaign to quell the revolts and pacify the region. Wang Lian strongly objected and said that Zhuge Liang, given his important status, should not undertake the risk of going into the dangerous and distant Nanzhong region. As Zhuge Liang was worried that none of the Shu generals was sufficiently competent for this task, he insisted on personally leading the campaign. However, Wang Lian's sincerity did make Zhuge Liang reconsider many times before he finalised his decision to go on the campaign in early 225. His objection to Zhuge Liang is the only time Wang Lian appears in the 14th century novel Romance of the Three Kingdoms.

Wang Lian died not long later, probably around 223. After his death, his son, Wang Shan (王山), inherited his marquis title and marquisate. Like his father, Wang Shan served as an official in Shu and the highest appointment he held was Administrator of Jiangyang Commandery (江陽郡; around present-day Neijiang, Sichuan).. Chen Shou when compiling the Records of the Three Kingdoms after the civil war praised Wang Lian's steadfast principles and Yang Xi, in his 241 work Ji Han Fuchen Zan (季漢輔臣贊) praised Wang Lian as a man of virtue, who kept to the standards and whom the army supplies could be relied on.

== See also ==
- Lists of people of the Three Kingdoms
