= Zhang Yi (Junsi) =

Chinese Shu Han official (c.166–230)

- 張裔

General Who Assists Han (輔漢將軍)
- In office 229 – 230
- Monarch: Liu Shan

Chief Clerk to the Imperial Chancellor (丞相長史)
- In office 228 – 230
- Monarch: Liu Shan
- Chancellor: Zhuge Liang

Colonel of Trainee Archers (射聲校尉)
- In office 228 – 230
- Monarch: Liu Shan
- Chancellor: Zhuge Liang

Administrator of Yizhou (Commandery) (益州太守)
- In office 223 – 228
- Monarch: Liu Shan
- Chancellor: Zhuge Liang

Administrator of Ba Commandery (巴郡太守)
- In office 214 – ?

Personal details
- Born: c. 166 (Note: According to the Sanguozhi, Zhang Yi, who conversing with Sun Quan prior to his release, stated, "At 58 (by East Asian age reckoning), I have already outlived my parents." This implies, but does not definitely show that he was 57 when Sun Quan released him, which was probably in 223 since that was the year when Deng Zhi visited Sun Quan, according to vol.70 of Zizhi Tongjian.) Chengdu, Sichuan
- Died: 230 (aged 64)
- Children: Zhang Mu; Zhang Yu
- Occupation: Official
- Courtesy name: Junsi (君嗣)

Zhang Yi (c. 166 – 230), courtesy name Junsi, was an official of the state of Shu Han in the Three Kingdoms period of China.

== Serving the Yi Province government ==
Zhang Yi was from Chengdu, the capital of Yi Province (covering present-day Sichuan and Chongqing). He was an avid reader of the Gongyang Zhuan and studied conscientiously the Book of Han along with the Shiji. When Xu Jing from Runan who was famous for his appraisals entered the Yi Province. He praised Zhang Yi as a nimble man in actions and perspicacious in reasons; even said that he was the equivalent of Zhong Yao from the central plains. He started his official career after Liu Zhang, the Governor of Yi Province, nominated him as a xiaolian (civil service candidate), later assigned as the Chief of Yufu. And was recalled to serve as an official in the Yi's staff.

Between 212 and 214, when conflict broke out between Liu Zhang and another warlord Liu Bei, Liu Zhang sent Zhang Yi to Deyang County to block Liu Bei's reinforcements from entering Yi Province. However, Liu Bei's general Zhang Fei defeated the force led by Zhang Yi, who was forced to return to Chengdu. In 214, as Liu Bei's forces besieged Liu Zhang in Chengdu, Liu Zhang sent Zhang Yi as his envoy to negotiate the terms of surrender with Liu Bei. Liu Bei reassured the people of his intention and promised that he would treat Liu Zhang well if he surrendered, which Liu Zhang did.

Liu Bei's adviser, Zhuge Liang, named Zhang Yi as one of the most capable officials who served under Liu Zhang, and urged Liu Bei to employ him. Liu Bei then appointed Zhang Yi as the Administrator (太守) of Ba Commandery (巴郡) and was promoted to Managing Metal Internal Cadet General. Here, he managed the manufacture of the warfare equipment and the production and distribution of the agriculture.

In late 222 or early 223, after Liu Bei lost the Battle of Xiaoting against his ally-turned-rival Sun Quan, the local tribes in southern Yizhou Commandery (益州郡; covering parts of present-day Yunnan), led by an elderly Yong Kai (雍闓) who was known as a kind man and trusted by them started a rebellion, killed Zheng Ang (正昂) the Shu-appointed Administrator of Jianning Commandery and secretly communicates with Sun Quan. Zhang Yi was sent to reclaim the prefecture, Yong Kai at first pretended that he wanted to yield but later refused to meet him. Then, he falsely declared that Zhang Yi is like a gourd; although impressed by his appearance, his inside is empty. After that, the rebels captured Zhang Yi but did not dare to kill him and instead sent him as a captive to Sun Quan.

== As a prisoner of Wu ==
Around 223, when the states of Shu Han and Eastern Wu reestablished their alliance against their rival state Cao Wei, Zhuge Liang, who had become Imperial Chancellor of Shu, sent Deng Zhi as an envoy to Wu to meet its ruler, Sun Quan. One of Deng Zhi's tasks was to seek the release of Zhang Yi and bring him back to Shu. Only then did Sun Quan meet Zhang Yi for the first time after he had been imprisoned for several years; he agreed to have him freed.

During the farewell banquet he held before sending Deng Zhi off, Sun Quan spoke to Zhang Yi and was very impressed with him. Later, after Zhang Yi left with Deng Zhi, Sun Quan regretted letting Zhang Yi leave because he wanted to recruit Zhang Yi to serve under him. He then sent his men to pursue them and bring Zhang Yi back, but from the moment he left Zhang Yi already regretted showing his wit and sensed that Sun Quan did not want to let him leave, had sped up his journey day and night upon leaving Wu and returned to Shu just one day ahead of Sun Quan's men.

== Service in the Chancellor's office ==
After his return to Shu, Zhang Yi served as an Army Adviser under Zhuge Liang and as an Assistant Officer at General Headquarters in Yi Province. Around 227, when Zhuge Liang launched the first of a series of military campaigns against Shu's rival state Wei, he appointed Zhang Yi as Colonel of Trainee Archers (射聲校尉) and Chief Clerk (長史) in the Imperial Chancellor's office.

He often declared that:

"Just rewards cannot omit the distant and sanctions shouldn't spare close persons. High rank must not be obtained without great achievements and punishment should not be because of family ties be forgotten. This is the sole reason why anyone from the common people to the men of high importance can do their best."

Zhang Yi did not join Zhuge Liang at the frontline and instead took charge of communications between Zhuge Liang and the Shu central government in Chengdu. As Zhuge Liang wanted to review everything before making a decision, Zhang Yi had to travel north to Hanzhong Commandery, where Zhuge Liang was stationed, to seek his opinion on key policy issues. As Zhang Yi left Chengdu, the road was full of people since hundreds of them lined the streets to bid him farewell.

He wrote back to those close to him:

"Since I walk this road; I receive guests day and night. Never I can find rest. People respect the Chancellor's Chief Clerk; and I this Zhang Junsi is just attached to him. I shall work tirelessly to the death."

His writing style was as such; often swift and eloquent.

In his later career, Zhang Yi was appointed as General Who Assists Han (輔漢將軍) but remained as Chief Clerk in Zhuge Liang's office. He died in 230 at around the age of 64. His two sons, Zhang Mu (張毣) and Zhang Yu (張郁), continued serving as officials in Shu; with Mao succeeding him and serving successively in three commanderies as Administrator.

== Appraisal ==
During his adulthood, Zhang Yi was close friend with a man of Qianwei, Yang Gong (楊恭), but Yang Gong died in his young age. His orphans were still children therefore Zhang Yi took them in his own residence and cared for them. He also treated Yang Gong's mother as if she was his own mother. When Yang Gong's children became adults, Zhang Yi bought fields and houses for their property and helped them to find wives and employment. He looked after his old friends, cared and supported the orphaned and fallen clans. His behaviour was as such and of utmost virtue.

== See also ==
- Lists of people of the Three Kingdoms
