= Yi Ji =

3rd century Shu Han diplomat, writer and official

- 伊籍

General of Illustrious Writing (昭文將軍)
- In office 221 – ?
- Monarch: Liu Bei / Liu Shan

Assistant Officer of the Household (從事中郎) (under Liu Bei)
- In office 214 – 221
- Monarchs: Emperor Xian of Han / Liu Bei (from 219)

Personal details
- Born: Unknown Juye County, Shandong
- Died: Unknown
- Occupation: Diplomat, politician, writer
- Courtesy name: Jibo (機伯)

Yi Ji (fl. 200s–221), courtesy name Jibo, was a Chinese diplomat and politician serving in the state of Shu Han during the Three Kingdoms period of China. He previously served under the warlord Liu Biao in the late Eastern Han dynasty before coming to serve Liu Bei, the founding emperor of Shu Han. Yi Ji was known as an excellent debater and helped write the Shu Ke (蜀科), the legal code of Shu, along with Zhuge Liang, Fa Zheng, Li Yan and Liu Ba.

== Life ==
Yi Ji was born in Shanyang Commandery (山陽郡), which covered roughly the area around present-day Juye County, Shandong. At a young age, he became a subordinate of fellow Shanyang man Liu Biao the Governor of Jing Province (covering present-day Hubei and Hunan) at a time when Liu Biao held the rank of General Who Guards the South (鎮南將軍), a position given by Li Jue's junta, placing the start of service at 192 at earliest. In the early 200s, when the warlord Liu Bei sought shelter under Liu Biao after his rival Cao Cao led troops to attack Runan. Liu Biao offered to let him stay in Xinye County in northern Jing Province. Yi Ji met Liu Bei several times around the time and became an acquaintance of Liu Bei.

After Liu Biao's death in 208, his younger son Liu Cong, who succeeded him, surrendered to Cao Cao when Cao led his forces on a campaign in southern China. Yi Ji joined Liu Bei on a journey southward towards Xiakou (夏口; present-day Wuhan, Hubei), which was guarded by Liu Biao's elder son Liu Qi and was independent of Cao Cao's control. Yi Ji became an official under Liu Bei since then and accompanied him in Yi province. In July 214, after Liu Bei seized control of Yi Province (covering present-day Sichuan and Chongqing) from its governor Liu Zhang, Yi Ji followed Liu Bei to Chengdu, the capital of Yi Province. Liu Bei, who held the nominal appointment of General of the Left (左將軍) under the Han central government then, appointed Yi Ji as an Assistant Officer of the Household (從事中郎) under him. Liu Bei's treatment of Yi Ji was second to that of Jian Yong, Sun Qian and others.

Liu Bei later sent Yi Ji as a messenger to Jiangdong (or Wu) to meet the warlord Sun Quan, Liu's ally in their war against Cao Cao. Sun Quan had heard of Yi Ji's debating skills before and he wanted to test Yi. When Yi Ji met Sun Quan, he knelt down to pay his respects. Sun Quan asked: "Are you tired of serving an incompetent lord?" Yi Ji immediately replied: "I just need to kneel down and pay my respects and then stand up. This isn't tiring to me." Yi Ji's quick thinking was always as such. Sun Quan was deeply impressed by him.

After the fall of the Han dynasty in 220, Yi Ji served in the state of Shu Han – founded by Liu Bei in 221 – during the Three Kingdoms period. He was promoted to the position of General of Illustrious Writing (昭文將軍). He drafted the laws of Shu with Zhuge Liang, Fa Zheng, Liu Ba and Li Yan. The records of his life ends with his work on the Shu Ke, the laws of Shu.

== Appraisal ==
Mi Zhu, Sun Qian, Jian Yong and Yi Ji were the core of Liu Bei's entourage. Chen Shou commented on them as follows: "They were refined and cultured persons, well known for their good observation of the proprieties.

== In The Records In Plain Language ==
First appears in the conquest of Yi, sent by Yi Ji to persuade the disaffected Zhang Yi to surrender Ziwu, where he had been held off Zhao Yun and then Zhang Fei. After the fall of Chengdu, Ma Chao arrived with thirty thousand troops and after wounding Wei Yan with an arrow, Yi Ji was sent by Liu Bei to persuade Ma Chao to surrender. Assigned the key defensive point of Yangping Pass, Liu Bei heads there when Cao Cao pushes on from conquest of Hanzhong and decides to push on into Liu Bei's new lands. Ma Chao is assigned with Yu Ji to help protect Yangping but Ma Chao is drunk and the pass falls to Zhang Liao. Yi Ji flees with less than a hundred horsemen back to Liu Bei after heavy pursuit by Cao Cao during the night.

After Liu Bei's death, reports of Yong Kai's revolt with the three southern cities and alliance with King Meng Huo though Zhuge Liang had already foreseen this would happen. During Zhuge Liang's third northern campaign when Zhuge Liang and Sima Yi are stalemated near Jieting, dismisses rumours at court that Zhuge Liang has rebelled and suggests Emperor Liu Shan summon Zhuge Liang to see if Zhuge Liang will come, proving Zhuge Liang's loyalty. As Yu Ji expected, Zhuge Liang obeyed the summons and blamed the matter as a trick by Sima Yi. Upon Sun Quan's death, Yi Ji sent with thousand strings worth of gold and gems to offer condolences and ensure Eastern Wu didn't cause trouble.

== In The Romance of the Three Kingdoms ==
Yi Ji first appears in chapter 34 as an officer of Liu Biao, warning Liu Bei his Dilu horse is cursed but convinced by Liu Bei's argument that man's life is governed by fate rather than horse. Liu Bei was fond of Yi Ji and Liu Qi would send Yi Ji to Liu Bei to inform him of Liu Biao's death and the Cai's machinations, asking for reinforcements though Liu Bei already knew after capturing Liu Cong's messenger to Cao Cao. Urged Liu Bei to seize Liu Cong but Liu Bei refused and him Yi Ji to prepare defences in Jiangxia as Liu Bei prepared to flee south.

After Liu Bei took parts of Jing following on from Chibi, Yi Ji finds Liu Bei and advises him to hire Ma Liang to provide strategy then joined Liu Bei's staff. When Zhuge Liang and Zhang Fei were summoned to help with the invasion of Yi, Zhuge Liang appointed Yi Ji to Guan Yu's civil staff, on list of those rewarded when Liu Bei conquered Yi. In 215, Zhang Lu surrendered Hanzhong to Cao Cao and Liu Bei became concerned that Cao Cao would attack Yi so Zhuge Liang sent Yi Ji to Sun Quan with an offer of Jing if Sun Quan would attack Hefei and thus draw Cao Cao's attention away from Yi, Sun Quan agreed to do so. In 219, Guan Yu discovered Wu had seized his base in Jing so sent Ma Liang and Yi Ji to Yi to seek aid but on the day they arrived, news came of Guan Yu's death. Was promoted on Liu Bei becoming Emperor.

== See also ==
- Lists of people of the Three Kingdoms
