= Peng Yang (Han dynasty) =

Chinese official of the Eastern Han dynasty (178-214)

- 彭羕

Administrator of Jiangyang (江陽太守)
- In office 214

Assistant Officer in the Headquarters Office (治中從事)
- In office 214

Personal details
- Born: 178; Guanghan, Sichuan
- Died: 214 (aged 36)
- Occupation: Official
- Courtesy name: Yongnian (永年)

Peng Yang (178–214), courtesy name Yongnian, was an official serving under the warlord Liu Bei during the late Eastern Han dynasty of China.

== Early life ==
Peng Yang was from Guanghan Commandery (廣漢郡), which is around present-day Guanghan, Sichuan. Described as a man about eight chi tall (approximately 1.84 metres) and having an extremely impressive appearance, he was notorious for being conceited, arrogant, rude and condescending towards others. Among his contemporaries, he respected only Qin Mi, who was also from Guanghan Commandery. He once recommended Qin Mi as a talent to Xu Jing, who was then the Administrator of Guanghan. In his recommendation letter, he compared Qin Mi to ancient sages such as Fu Yue, Jiang Ziya and Li Yiji, and praised Qin Mi for his virtuous, loyal, sincere and humble behaviour.

Peng Yang later served as an official in his native Yi Province (covering present-day Sichuan and Chongqing) but never made it to any position higher than that of a scribe (書佐). His offensive behaviour also landed him in deep trouble when his colleagues slandered him in front of Liu Zhang, the Governor of Yi Province. Liu Zhang believed them and ordered Peng Yang to be shaved bald, put in chains, and sent to perform hard labour.

== Service under Liu Bei ==
In 211, when the warlord Liu Bei led his forces into Yi Province to assist Liu Zhang in countering a rival warlord Zhang Lu in Hanzhong, Peng Yang travelled north to find Liu Bei in the hope of joining him. He paid a visit to Pang Tong, one of Liu Bei's key advisers. When Peng Yang showed up at his house, Pang Tong was entertaining other guests as well, but Peng Yang did not care and he went straight to Pang Tong's seat and sat there comfortably. He told Pang Tong: "I will only speak to you when all your other guests have left." After the other guests left, Peng Yang demanded that Pang Tong serve him food before they started talking. Peng Yang also stayed at Pang Tong's house for days and had long conversations with him. Pang Tong was so impressed with Peng Yang that he recommended him as a talent to Liu Bei. Fa Zheng, another of Liu Bei's key advisers, had heard of Peng Yang's talent so he also recommended Peng Yang to his lord.

Liu Bei saw Peng Yang as an extraordinary talent and immediately recruited him. He often assigned Peng Yang the tasks of relaying military orders, and guiding and instructing his officers. Peng Yang performed his tasks well and became increasingly favoured by Liu Bei.

In 214, after Liu Bei seized control of Yi Province from Liu Zhang and became the new Governor of Yi Province, he appointed Peng Yang as an Assistant Officer in the Headquarters Office (治中從事) of Yi Province. As he had risen through the ranks to a position much higher than his previous appointment as a scribe, Peng Yang felt very smug about his achievements and started behaving in an arrogant manner towards others.

Zhuge Liang, Liu Bei's chief adviser, disliked Peng Yang but pretended to be accommodating and tolerant towards him. He secretly warned Liu Bei on numerous occasions that Peng Yang was a highly ambitious individual who might become a threat to them in the long term. As Liu Bei highly trusted Zhuge Liang and had been quietly observing Peng Yang's actions and behaviour, he believed Zhuge Liang was right so he started distancing himself from Peng Yang. Later, he sent Peng Yang away from Chengdu, Yi Province's capital, to serve as the Administrator of Jiangyang Commandery (江陽郡; around present-day Luzhou, Sichuan).

== Downfall and execution ==
When Peng Yang learnt that he was going to be sent away from Chengdu to serve as a commandery administrator elsewhere, he felt very unhappy so he visited Ma Chao, one of Liu Bei's generals, and told him about it. Ma Chao asked him: "You are an outstanding talent. Our lord trusts and regards you highly. You should be serving him alongside people like Kongming and Xiaozhi. When you accept your reassignment to a small commandery, doesn't that take you further away from your initial goal(s)?" Peng Yang grumbled: "That old piece of leather (Note: In ancient China, soldiers wore leather armour so "leather" could colloquially refer to soldiers. When Peng Yang called Liu Bei an "old piece of leather", he was essentially calling Liu Bei an old soldier.) is ridiculous and muddle-headed! What else can I say?" He also told Ma Chao: "You are outside while I am inside. The Empire can be pacified." His words were interpreted as asking Ma Chao to join him in plotting a coup d'état against Liu Bei.

As Ma Chao had only recently joined Liu Bei, he often feared that he would get into trouble so he did not respond even though he felt shocked after hearing what Peng Yang told him. After Peng Yang left, he secretly reported him to the authorities. As a result, Peng Yang was arrested and imprisoned for plotting treason against Liu Bei.

While awaiting his execution, Peng Yang wrote a letter to Zhuge Liang as follows:

"I have had dealings with the other warlords in the past. I think that Cao Cao is cruel and barbaric, Sun Quan is unrighteous in his ways, and Liu Zhang is incompetent and weak. I saw that only our lord has the potential to become a ruler so I decided to assist him in bringing peace to the Empire. Because of this, I decided to change my goals, and this change brought me to greater heights. It was so fortunate that our lord came to the west while I was thinking of joining him. With help from Fa Xiaozhi and Pang Tong, I was able to meet our lord at Jiameng, share with him my ideas on ruling a state, starting a dynasty, and my plan for him to conquer Yi Province. You had a farsighted and brilliant plan as well, and you had the same thoughts as me. That was why our lord decided to seize Yi Province by force.

In the past, I had nothing to my name in my native province, and I often got into trouble. I was lucky enough to live in an era of chaos and war, and be able to find a lord whom I admire and respect. I was thus able to realise my goal, become famous, and rise up from the status of a commoner to the position of a high-ranking official reserved only for the most talented. Our lord treated me like a son. Who else can treat me more generously than him? Because of my arrogance, I sought my doom and I will go down as a disloyal and unrighteous man! No person of sound mind would hold a map of the Empire in his left hand and hold a sword to his throat in his right hand. Besides, I am also someone who can tell the difference between beans and grains.

I had complaints because I overestimated myself and wishfully believed that I had gained top credit so I did not deserve to be sent to Jiangyang. When I said that (to Ma Chao), I failed to understand our lord's good intention. I was full of unhappiness so I lost control of my mouth as I blurted out the word "old" after having a few drinks. I was foolish and shallow when I said this. Our lord is actually not "old" at all. Besides, why does age matter when it comes to starting a dynasty? King Wen of Zhou was still young at heart when he was already 90 years old. I have let down my lord who has been like a kind fatherly figure to me, and I deserve to die a hundred times for this.

What I truly meant when I talked about "outside" and "inside" was that I hoped that Mengqi would fight for our lord at the frontline while I serve our lord in Chengdu, and we work together to bring down Cao Cao. Why would I have traitorous thoughts? Although Mengqi quoted me correctly, he misunderstood the true meaning of my words. I am extremely disappointed.

In the past, I made a pledge with Pang Tong to follow in your footsteps and strive our best to help our lord achieve his goal, and leave behind our names in history like the wise sages of ancient times. Pang Tong met his tragic end, while I brought disaster upon myself. Who else can I blame but myself for getting into this situation? You are the Yi Yin and Lü Wang of the present. You should do your best to assist our lord in fulfilling his dream and achieving his goal. May Heaven and Earth bear witness to this, and may all the gods bless you. What else can I say? I sincerely hope that you will understand my most heartfelt intention. I wish you all the best. Take care! Take care!"

Peng Yang was 37 years old (by East Asian age reckoning) when he was executed.

== See also ==
- Lists of people of the Three Kingdoms
