= Jian Yong =

Early third century official serving warlord Liu Bei

- 簡雍
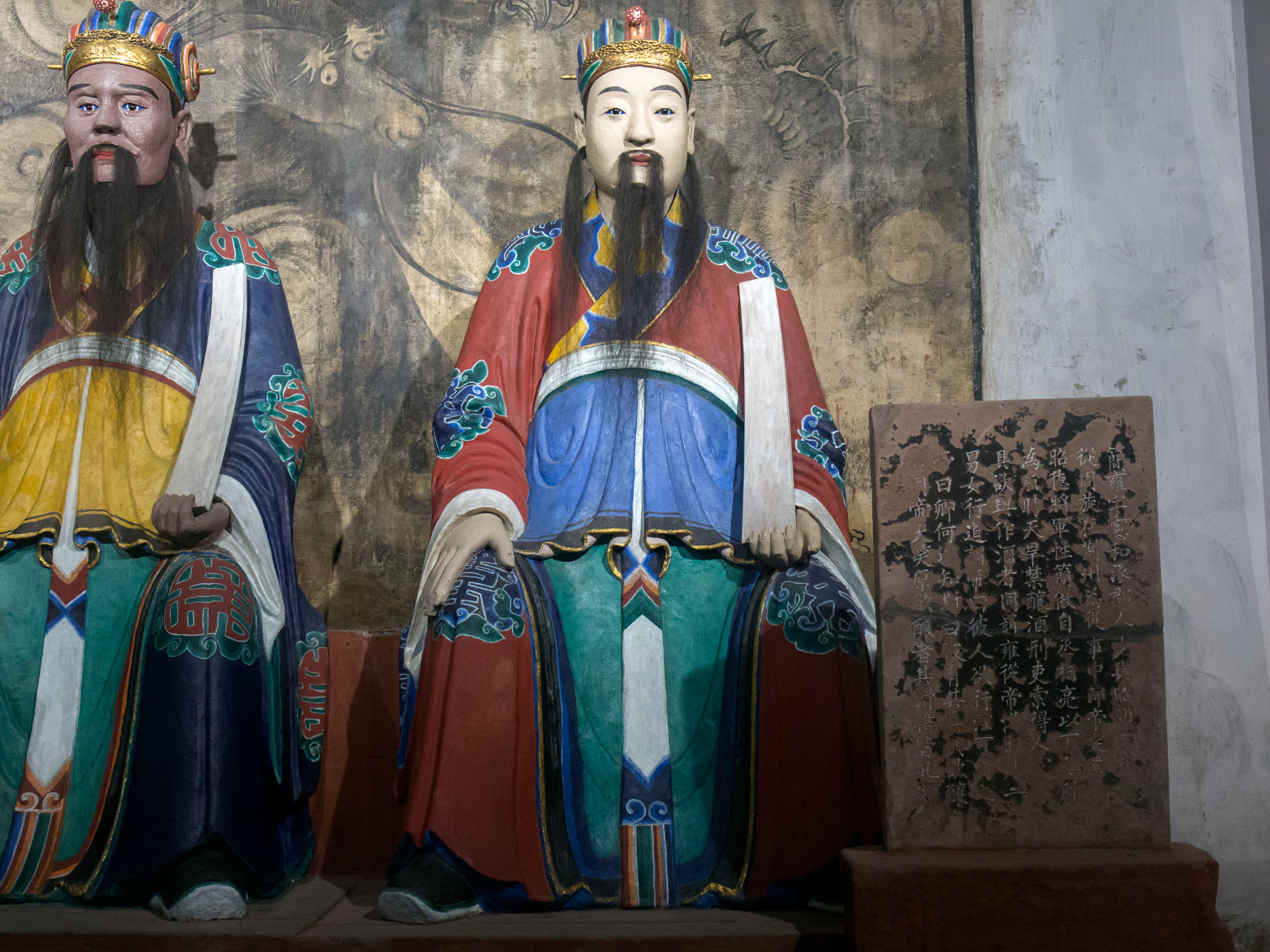
- Statue of Jian Yong at the Zhuge Liang Memorial Temple in Chengdu, Sichuan

General of Illustrious Virtue (昭德將軍) (under Liu Bei)
- In office 214 – ?
- Monarch: Emperor Xian of Han

Assistant Officer of the Household (從事中郎) (under Liu Bei)
- In office 201 – 214
- Monarch: Emperor Xian of Han

Personal details
- Born: Unknown Zhuo Commandery
- Died: Unknown
- Occupation: Politician
- Courtesy name: Xianhe (憲和)

Jian Yong (fl. 180s–210s), courtesy name Xianhe, was a Chinese politician serving under the warlord Liu Bei in the late Eastern Han dynasty of China. He started working under Liu Bei since the very beginning of Liu Bei's career; he originally served as his lord's personal secretary and later as a messenger, minister or emissary for his lord. He was also known for being persuasive and broad-minded and for his carefree personality. Along with Mi Zhu, Sun Qian, and later Yi Ji, Jian's ideas were widely circulated in Liu's territories, which featured Confucius values and Han loyalist arguments, he greatly helped Liu Bei's image gaining creditably to the later's populist movement. Jian is thought to have died shortly after 214.

== Life ==
Jian Yong was born in Zhuo Commandery (涿郡), which is in present-day Zhuozhou, Hebei. His original family name was Geng (耿), but in his native You Province (Zhuo Commandery was in You Province), Geng had the same pronunciation as Jian, so he changed his family name to Jian. He was a childhood friend of Liu Bei and later he became one of his subordinates following him on his travels. When Liu Bei was taking shelter in Jing Province, Jian Yong, along with Mi Zhu and Sun Qian, served as Assistant Officer of the Household (從事中郎) under him. They acted as his political activists outside of usually being sent as messengers or emissaries for their lord.

In 211, when Liu Bei entered Yi Province (covering present-day Sichuan and Chongqing) under the pretext of helping its governor Liu Zhang defend his jurisdiction against a rival warlord Zhang Lu, he sent Jian Yong as an emissary to meet Liu Zhang. Liu Zhang greatly favoured Jian Yong. Later, when war broke out between Liu Bei and Liu Zhang, and Liu Bei had gained the upper hand against his rival and had besieged Yi Province's capital Chengdu, Jian Yong was sent to persuade Liu Zhang to give up resistance. Liu Zhang agreed, and, with Jian Yong by his side, he rode out of the city in a chariot to surrender. After occupying Yi Province and setting up his new base in Chengdu in 214, Liu Bei promoted Jian Yong to the position of General of Illustrious Virtue (昭德將軍).

Jian Yong was known for being an excellent debater and speaker. In his writing and speech he was far more extreme in Laozi philosophy than most of Liu Bei's other subjects. He was carefree in his ways and showed little regard for formalities. When he sat down beside Liu Bei, which was odd because even Liu's longterm subjects like Zhang Fei and Mi Zhu always were formal, Jian behaved boldly, ignored proper etiquette, and sat in a manner to make himself feel comfortable. When he attended banquets hosted by Zhuge Liang, he would occupy an entire couch, recline on a pillow, and speak to others in a relaxed position. He did not condescend to anyone.

Once, there was a drought in Yi Province and a law prohibiting alcohol went into effect. People who brewed alcoholic drinks would be punished. Over-zealous officials seized brewing utensils from families and suggested to punish the owners of the utensils as if the owners were as guilty as brewers. When Jian Yong and Liu Bei was inspecting the land, they saw a couple walking past, and Jian said to his lord: "They're planning to commit an indecent act. Why not arrest them?" Liu Bei asked, "How do you know?" Jian Yong replied, "They're equipped with the tools to do so, just as the owners of brewing utensils have the tools to brew alcoholic drinks." Liu Bei laughed and pardoned the families who owned brewing utensils. Such was Jian Yong's wit.

== Appraisal ==
Chen Shou, who wrote Jian Yong's biography in Records of the Three Kingdoms, commented on Jian as follows: "Mi Zhu, Sun Qian, Jian Yong and Yi Ji were refined and cultured persons whose ideas were widely circulated. They were well known for their good observation of the proprieties."

== See also ==
- Lists of people of the Three Kingdoms
