= Liu Bei's takeover of Yi Province =

Military campaign by warlord Liu Bei (213-214)

- Part of the wars at the end of the Han dynasty
Date	January or February 213 – July 214
Location	Yi Province (present-day Sichuan and Chongqing), China
Result	Liu Bei victory

Belligerents
Liu Bei	Liu Zhang; Zhang Lu

Commanders and leaders
Liu Bei; Pang Tong †; Huang Zhong; Zhang Fei; Ma Chao (defected from Zhang Lu)	Liu Zhang (surrendered); Liu Xun; Zhang Ren (executed); Zhang Yi; Yan Yan (surrendered)

Strength
More than 30,000 soldiers under Liu Bei; Unknown number of reinforcement by Zhang Fei, Zhao Yun and Zhuge Liang	At least 30,000 soldiers defending Chengdu; Unknown number of troops under the different commanders of the region

Casualties and losses
Unknown	Unknown

Liu Bei's takeover of Yi Province
- Traditional Chinese: 劉備爭奪益州之戰
- Simplified Chinese: 刘备争夺益州之战
Transcriptions
Standard Mandarin
- Hanyu Pinyin: Líu Bèi Zhēngduó Yìzhōu Zhī Zhàn

Liu Bei's takeover of Yi Province was a military campaign by the warlord Liu Bei in taking control of Yi Province (covering present-day Sichuan and Chongqing) from the provincial governor, Liu Zhang. The campaign took place between the years 211 and 214 in the late Eastern Han dynasty; although the conflict between Liu Bei and Liu Zhang started in January or February 213 when the latter discovered the former secret communications and subsequently executed Zhang Song. (Note: The 17th year of the Jian'an era ended on 8 February 213 in the Julian calendar. Zhang Song's execution is one of the last recorded events of the year. Thus, Zhang Song likely died in January or February 213.) It concluded with victory for Liu Bei and his successful takeover of the province from Liu Zhang in July 214. Yi Province (Note: specifically, its capital of Chengdu and its nearby commanderies) would serve as the foundation of the state of Shu Han during the Three Kingdoms period.

== Background ==
After the Battle of Red Cliffs, Sun Quan invited Liu Bei to take Yi Province with him, but the latter strongly rebutted the former, saying: "if you're going to conquer the land of Shu, I will loosen my hair and become a hermit in the deep hills. Earth under Heaven can hear my promise, and I'll live up to my words!" Believing Liu Bei, Sun Quan aborted his plan; however, Liu Bei was actually trying to take Yi Province for himself and negotiated Yiling County and Nan Commandery from Sun Quan. (Note: Yiling was an entrance to Yi Province from Jing Province (covering present-day Hubei and Hunan).) In 211, Liu Zhang, the Governor of Yi Province, heard that Cao Cao was planning to attack Zhang Lu in Hanzhong Commandery. As Hanzhong Commandery was a strategic location and the "gateway" into Yi Province, Liu Zhang sent Fa Zheng to form an alliance with Liu Bei after Zhang Song convinced him to do so. Liu Bei then led his men to Yi Province under the pretence of helping Liu Zhang conquer Hanzhong Commandery.

== The campaign (211–214) ==
=== Takeover of Jiameng (211–213) ===
In 211, Liu Bei led an expedition force of tens of thousands of soldiers into Yi Province after leaving behind Zhuge Liang, Guan Yu, Zhang Fei and Zhao Yun to guard Jing Province. When Liu Bei entered Yi province, it was as if he was returning home. When he arrived at Fu County (涪縣; in present-day Fuling District, Chongqing) Liu Zhang led 30 000 soldiers in a flambloyant display to welcome Liu Bei warmly; it was the occasion of a great meeting where they feasted for more than 100 days. Liu Zhang provided Liu Bei with more provisions and equipment for his army before they parted ways.

During this meeting; Fa Zheng told Liu Bei that Zhang Song along with Pang Tong wanted to use this opportunity to capture Liu Zhang and force him to hand over Yi Province; however Liu Bei didn't follow this plan because he felt that the plan was too hasty and that he should first win the hearts of the people of Yi province. Many of Liu Zhang's retainers protested against his decision to invite Liu Bei into the Yi province. Among them were Liu Ba and Huang Quan with Wang Lei (王累) committing suicide. Yan Yan famously remarked that Liu Zhang's decision was the equivalent of setting a tiger free to defend himself.

Liu Bei's army totalled more than 30,000 soldiers, all well-equipped along with many supplies. They headed to Jiameng Pass (Note: southwest of present-day Guangyuan, Sichuan) at the border between Liu Zhang and Zhang Lu's territories. However, instead of engaging Zhang Lu, Liu Bei halted his advance and focused on building up connections and gaining influence around the area in preparation for his takeover of Yi Province. Since he was kind and virtuous, many among the masses soon joined him. Among them was an eccentric man named Peng Yang, he quickly became friends with Pang Tong. With Pang Tong's and Fa Zheng's support, Peng Yang joined Liu Bei's staff. He revealed himself to be a highly talented military instructor and became even more favoured by Liu Bei.

Next year in 212, Liu Bei sent a letter to Liu Zhang where he told Zhang that he needed more troops to divert Cao Cao's attention away from the east (Note: where Sun Quan was under attack and asked for his help) and support Guan Yu against Yue Jin in Jing Province; he also mentioned that Zhang Lu was only looking to preserve his state and wouldn't engage in aggressive actions. Therefore, he requested another 10,000 soldiers and additional provisions to aid in the defense of Jing Province. Liu Zhang gave him 40% of the troops and half of the others he asked for. When he saw that Liu Zhang didn't fulfill his demands, Liu Bei rallied his men and asked them how Liu Zhang could expect them to risk their lives for him when he accumulated wealth while being picky about the distribution of their reward.

When Zhang Song heard that there were discussion about Liu Bei leaving to defend Jing province, he pressed Liu Bei and Fa Zheng to stay in Yi province. Soon, Zhang Su (張肅), Zhang Song's brother, discovered his brother's secret communications with Liu Bei, feared that he would become a victim if he failed, and reported the issue to Liu Zhang. Liu Zhang was furious and stunned when he heard that Zhang Song had been helping Liu Bei to plot against him; he executed Zhang Song and ordered his military officers guarding the passes to Chengdu to keep secret his knowledge of Liu Bei's intentions.

When Wei officials heard about the starting conflict between Liu Bei and Liu Zhang, there were discussions about who would overcome the other. Zhao Jian (趙戩) believed that Liu Bei didn't have the talent to accomplish such a task, highlighting his past failures as well as Yi province's natural defences making it easy to defend and difficult to conquer. However Fu Gan (傅幹) (Note: father of Fu Xuan) argued that: "Liu Bei is benevolent and tolerant and his men are willing to give their lives in his service. Zhuge Liang is a perspicacious administrator who quickly grasps the changing situations. He is honorable, talented in planning and work as his chancellor. Zhang Fei and Guan Yu are brave and also possess righteousness. Both of them are known as warriors who are a match for ten thousand men (萬人敵) and are his commanders. These three men are heroes. Knowing of Liu Bei's awareness along with those three heroes assisting him. How could he not succeed?"

=== Early Success (January or February 213–April or May 213) ===
Liu Bei learned about what happened to Zhang Song from secret informers. Fa Zheng and Meng Da were already with his army and choose to defect to Liu Bei's side before Yang Huai (楊懷) and Gao Pei (高沛), Liu Zhang's subordinates guarding Baishui Pass (白水關), knew about Liu Bei's true intentions. Now, Liu Bei had no choice but to conquer Yi Province. Pang Tong outlined three plans for Liu Bei to choose from: The first was to advance swiftly to seize Chengdu, the capital of Yi Province, from Liu Zhang. The second was to take command of Liu Zhang's armies in the north and then move to capture Chengdu. The third one was to return to Baidicheng to await further action.

Liu Bei chose the second option. He lured Yang Huai and Gao Pei into a trap and executed them under the pretense of behaving disrespectfully towards him. Wei Yan, who had just begun to serve under Liu Bei, was appointed as a bodyguard in his retinue; he made numerous achievements in several battles. When they learned of Liu Bei's attack, Zheng Du (鄭度) remarked that Liu Bei's army was isolated and consisted of only 10 000 soldiers, hence he suggested to Liu Zhang a scorched earth policy by forcing the civilians of Baxi (巴西) and Zitong (梓潼) commanderies to relocate elsewhere and destroy all the supply depots in the commanderies. Zheng Du reasoned that Liu Bei's army was low on supplies and composed of new recruits who may not be loyal to him. Following this strategy along with a solid defence into the fortress while refusing any engagement in open battles would force Liu Bei to retreat and allow Liu Zhang to launch a counterattack. Liu Bei felt greatly disturbed when he learned about the plan, but Fa Zheng reassured him that Liu Zhang would never follow this plan. He was proven right as Liu Zhang told his subordinates: "I have heard of fighting the enemy to save the people; not of disrupting the people to avoid the enemy." Furthermore, he removed Zheng Du from office.

Finally, Liu Bei had Huang Zhong and Zhuo Ying (卓應) lead his soldiers against Liu Zhang. During this campaign, Huang Zhong would show great martial skills and was always the first to break the enemy's formations. When Liu Bei entered the different passes; he took the commanders as hostage along with their family, wives and children. Then, he took command of their troops. Liu Bei led his army along with Huang Zhong and Zhuo Ying to attack Fu County (涪縣; present-day Mianyang, Sichuan) and occupied the city.

Following those success, Liu Bei organized a banquet where he expressed his great joy having conquered all the passes. He said to Pang Tong that today is an auspicious day. However Pang Tong answered that celebrating warfare isn't what a benevolent man should do. Liu Bei was angry at his response and told him that he should leave. Liu Bei came to regret his actions and asked for Pang Tong to rejoin him. Pang Tong then drank and eat as before, when Liu Bei asked him who was in the wrong previously, he answered both of them. Liu Bei greatly laughed and feasted as before.

Thereafter, Liu Zhang sent Liu Gui (劉璝), Leng Bao (冷苞), Zhang Ren, Deng Xian (鄧賢) and Wu Yi along with other officers to oppose him at Fu County. However all of them were defeated by Liu Bei and had to retreat to Mianzhu. Despite being the most trusted vassal of Liu Zhang, Wu Yi soon changed allegiance. Liu Zhang sent Li Yan and Fei Guan to help Mianzhu, but they surrendered to Liu Bei as well. With each victory, Liu Bei's army became stronger therefore he could dispatch commanders to pacify the other commanderies. Finally, Fei Shi, the Prefect of Mianzhu (綿竹令) led the defenders to surrender. After Liu Bei conquered Mianzhu, he left Ma Su in charge as his Prefect (令).

While Liu Bei led his army deeper into Yi province, Huo Jun was left in charge of the defence of Jiameng pass; a strategic point between Liu Zhang and Zhang Lu's territories. Zhang Lu wanted to use this opportunity to conquer Jiameng and sent Yang Bo (楊帛) to deceive Huo Jun into opening the gate, but Huo Jun saw through this and told him that although they could take his head, they could never have never the fortress. Yang Bo could only withdraw his troops. After this, Liu Zhang's generals Fu Jin (扶禁), Xiang Cun (向存) and others led an army of more than 10 000 soldiers to attack his position. Even though he only commanded just a few hundred men, Huo Jun mounted a stalwart defence and resisted their assault. After a siege that lasted one year, discipline within Liu Zhang's army was low. Huo Jun used this opportunity and selected his best soldiers to lead a sortie; he inflicted them a heavy defeat beheading Xiang Cun during the battle.

=== Defence of Luo Castle (April or May 213–April or May 214) ===
Liu Zhang's eldest son, Liu Xun (劉循), took command of the remnants and retreated to Luo County (雒縣; north of present-day Guanghan, Sichuan) to join forces with Zhang Ren. They barricaded the entrance to the castle, therefore Liu Bei led his army and surrounded them. Zhang Ren attempted to break the siege by leading his men onto the Wild Goose Bridge and charging Liu Bei's forces, but he was defeated and captured. His loyalty and bravery were well known, so Liu Bei ordered his army to force the captive into submission. However, Zhang Ren said, "A loyal subject will never serve two masters!" Liu Bei lamented his determination and had him executed. While they besieged Luo county, Fa Zheng wrote a letter to Liu Zhang to convince him to surrender, but Liu Zhang ignored it. Liu Bei sent his adviser Pang Tong to lead a major assault on Luo castle, but the defenders fought back with projectiles and Pang Tong was killed by a stray arrow.

With Pang Tong's death, the siege became a prolonged one that lasted around a year. During this time, Lü Dai met Liu Bei and reported to Sun Quan that Liu Bei's army was in disarray since they were stuck in a long siege inside hostile territory, and many of his soldiers had deserted. (Note: The text mentions that they met at Baidi. However, there is no reason or explanation as to when, how and why Liu Bei would be at Baidicheng (in present-day Fengjie County, Chongqing).) Lü Dai himself believed Liu Bei would fail to conquer Yi province, contrary to another Wu official Wu Fan's opinion.

Eventually Liu Bei was forced to call for reinforcements from Jing Province. In April 214, Zhang Fei led an army from Jing Province to attack Jiangzhou (in present-day Chongqing), where he defeated Zhao Zan (趙筰), the Administrator of Ba Commandery, and captured Yan Yan. Facing Zhang Fei's insults, Yan Yan condemned him for invading Yi Province. Zhang Fei initially ordered Yan Yan to be executed, but the latter's fearlessness of death impressed Zhang, who pardoned the captive's life. Following the Dian River (垫江), Zhang Fei broke through a thin defence line, and rendezvoused with Liu Bei. Zhang Fei also defeated another army led by Zhang Yi along the way; thereafter, he could lead his army to Chengdu. During this campaign, Liu Bei's adopted son Liu Feng followed Zhang Fei's army. He was only slightly older than 20 but he impressed many with his martial skills and extraordinary strength. Zhao Yun and Zhuge Liang also conquered the surrounding counties and commanderies in the area before their arrival from another route.

=== Fall of Chengdu (April or May 214–July 214) ===
After a siege of one year, Luo castle finally fell. Liu Bei then surrounded Chengdu with the other armies Ma Chao, a former Liang Province warlord and a vassal of Zhang Lu, was hated by Zhang Lu's subordinate Yang Bai (楊柏) along with others who were jealous of his ability and wanted to harm him; therefore Ma Chao wanted to use this opportunity to join Liu Bei. Liu Bei was pleased to hear this and exclaimed "Yi province is mine." He had Li Hui (Note: who recently joined him at Mianzhu) welcome Ma Chao and provided him with soldiers and supplies to besiege Chengdu. Upon seeing Ma Chao's army to the north of Chengdu, the citizens inside the city were terrified and within 10 days following his arrival, Liu Zhang surrendered.

The morale of Liu Zhang's army was at an all-time low and only a few of his generals such as Huang Quan and Wang Lian at Guanghan and Zitong wouldn't yield to Liu Bei and kept resisting. During this time, the former Administrator of Guanghan (廣漢太守), Zhu Shuxian (朱叔賢) wanted to escape the city to surrender, however Liu Zhang heard about it and had him executed. Following this, Liu Zhang wanted to force his widow Zhang Zhaoyi (張昭儀) to marry a soldier. Instead, she took her own life. Her action touched the whole army, and Chang Qu recorded her as a martyr in the Chronicles of Huayang.

After a siege that lasted several weeks, Liu Bei decided to send his longtime adviser, Jian Yong, whom Liu Zhang was already fond of before the war broke out, to speak to Liu Zhang. Jian Yong managed to convince Liu Zhang to surrender. Thus, Liu Zhang opened Chengdu's gates and surrendered to Liu Bei; at this time the city still possessed 30 000 soldiers along with enough supplies for a year; many among the officials and people wanted to fight to death but Liu Zhang refused stating that he didn't want to see further bloodshed. Everyone inside the city wept for his sacrifice. Liu Bei then succeeded Liu Zhang as Governor of Yi Province, and he conferred on the latter the seal and tassel of General of Vehement Might (奮威將軍) before expatriating him and Liu Chan to Gong'an County in Jing province.

Since the Yi Province was prosperous, Liu Bei was able to host a great banquet. He used the gold and silver recently won to reward his soldiers and commanders; moreover he gave grain and silk to the common people. After he assumed the position of Governor of Yi Province, he promoted his followers new and old to higher ranks, even those recently employed by Liu Zhang such as Dong He, Huang Quan and Li Yan or related to him by marriage such as Fei Guan and Wu Yi. All of them were put into positions of power to make use of their talent. Among the elite with talent; there were none who did not compete for Liu Bei's attention. Then, he married Wu Yi's sister in an attempt to solidify his control on the newly conquered domain. Moreover a new code of law was applied to Yi Province called the Shu Ke (蜀科) formulated by Liu Bei's followers, Zhuge Liang and Yi Ji along with recently retainers of Liu Zhang, Fa Zheng, Li Yan and Liu Ba. According to Zhuge Liang's biography, although the new code of law was strict, nobody complained because he was fair.

== Aftermath ==
Upon hearing Liu Bei had taken Yi Province, Sun Quan sent envoys to ask him for the return of his territory in Jing Province, but Liu Bei said: "I'm about to conquer Liang Province. Therefore, I will need to use all of Jing Province." Sun Quan was furious when his envoy reported Liu Bei's words, and he sent Lü Meng and Ling Tong with another four officers to retake southern Jing Province. After Lü Meng and his colleagues captured three commanderies, Liu Bei returned to Gong'an County and prepared to seize back the three commanderies by force. However, he eventually arrived at a border treaty with Sun Quan when he heard Cao Cao was planning to attack Hanzhong Commandery.

== Order of battle ==
=== Liu Bei army (211–214) ===
- Liu Bei, commander
- † Pang Tong, director general until 214
- Peng Yang, advisor
- Ma Su, advisor
- Huang Zhong, general
- Zhuo Ying (卓膺), general
- Wei Yan, Lt. general
- Huo Jun, general
- Jian Yong, advisor, diplomat
- Chen Zhen, advisor
- Yi Ji, advisor
- Zhang Cun, advisor
- Xi Zhen, advisor
- Deng Fang, general
- Fu Kuang, served in Liu Bei's army

=== Reinforcements from Jing (April 214–July 214) ===
- Zhang Fei, general
- Zhuge Liang, director general after 214
- Zhao Yun, general
- Liu Feng, Lt. general
- Zong Yu, served in Zhang Fei's army

=== Defectors ===
- Fa Zheng, advisor, defected over from Liu Zhang's side prior to battle in January or February 213
- Meng Da, general, defected over from Liu Zhang's side prior to battle in January or February 213
- Li Hui, advisor, diplomat defected over from Liu Zhang's side to Liu Bei in March or April 213
- Ma Chao, general defected over from Zhang Lu's side to Liu Bei in June or July 214

=== Liu Zhang forces (211–214) ===
- Chengdu garrison
  - (surrendered) Liu Zhang
  - Wang Lei (王累), committed suicide to warn Liu Zhang against inviting Liu Bei into Yi Province
  - (executed) Zhang Song executed by Liu Zhang; when he learned his secret communications with Liu Bei
  - Zhu Shuxian (朱叔賢) executed by Liu Zhang; when he learned he wanted to surrender
  - (surrendered) Liu Ba
  - (surrendered) Xu Jing
- Baishui garrison
  - (executed) Yang Huai (楊懷)
  - (executed) Gao Pei (高沛)
- Fu army
  - (surrendered) Wu Yi
  - Liu Gui (劉璝)
  - Leng Bao (冷苞)
  - Deng Xian (鄧賢)
- Mianzhu army
  - (surrendered) Li Yan
  - (surrendered) Fei Guan
- Mianzhu garrison
  - (surrendered) Fei Shi
- Luo garrison
  - (surrendered) Liu Xun (劉循)
  - (executed) Zhang Ren
- Jiameng army
  - † Xiang Cun (向存)
  - Fu Jin (扶禁)
- Ba garrison
  - Zhao Zan (趙筰)
  - (POW) (surrendered) Yan Yan
  - (surrendered) Gong Chen
- Deyang army
  - (surrendered) Zhang Yi
- Zitong garrison
  - (surrendered) Wang Lian surrendered following Liu Zhang
- Guanghan garrison
  - (surrendered) Huang Quan surrendered following Liu Zhang
