= Gao Pei =

General serving under warlord Liu Zhang (died 213)

- 高沛
- Monarch: Liu Zhang

Personal details
- Born: unknown
- Died: 213 (Note: Conflict between Liu Bei and Liu Zhang started with Zhang Song's death. The 17th year of the Jian'an era ended on 8 February 213 in the Julian calendar. Zhang Song's execution is one of the last recorded events of the year. Thus, Zhang Song likely died in January or February 213.)
- Occupation: General

Gao Pei (died 213) was a military general serving under Liu Zhang, ruler of Yi Province (present-day Sichuan and Chongqing), during the Three Kingdoms period of China.

== Life ==
Little is known of Gao Pei, except that he was assigned along with Yang Huai to guard Baishui Pass (白水關) from Zhang Lu in case he was to attack.

However, when Liu Bei entered Liu Zhang's Yi Province on the pretext of defending Liu Zhang from the warlords Zhang Lu and Cao Cao, he had the intention of taking Yi Province. Liu Bei followed the second plan of his advisor Pang Tong to first take control of Liu Zhang's armies in the north, then move to capture the capital of Chengdu. As a first step, Liu Bei entered Baishui Pass by catching Gao and Yang off guard, and before reinforcements could arrive, Gao and Yang were executed on the pretext that they were being disrespectful to Liu Bei. Liu Bei took the pass's garrison into his army, and proceeded to attack Fu County (涪縣; in present-day Fuling District, Chongqing). (Note: In 213 Gao Pei was a general of Liu Zhang in Ba commandery. As Liu Bei prepared to turn against Liu Zhang he arrested Gao Pei and his colleague Yang Huai, charged them with a lack of courtesy, and killed them.)

== In Romance of the Three Kingdoms ==
In the 14th-century historical novel Romance of the Three Kingdoms, When Liu Bei arrived at the pass, both Gao Pei and Yang Huai had faked their surrendering, and planned on assassinating Liu Bei, however, Pang Tong's insight had revealed their intentions to Liu Bei, so Gao Pei and Yang Huai were executed.

== See also ==
- Lists of people of the Three Kingdoms
