= Fei Shi (Three Kingdoms) =

3rd century Shu Han state official

- 費詩

Counsellor Remonstrant (諫議大夫)
- In office after 234 – ?
- Monarch: Liu Shan

Administrator of Zangke (牂牁太守)
- In office ?–?

Prefect of Mianzhu (綿竹令)
- In office ? – 213
- Succeeded by: Ma Su

Personal details
- Born: Unknown Leshan, Sichuan
- Died: after 234
- Children: Fei Li
- Occupation: Official
- Courtesy name: Gongju (公舉)

Fei Shi (fl. 214–234, died after 234), courtesy name Gongju, was an official of the state of Shu Han during the Three Kingdoms period of China.

== Life ==
Fei Shi was from Nan'an County (南安縣), Qianwei Commandery (犍為郡), which is around present-day Leshan, Sichuan. He originally served under Liu Zhang, the Governor of Yi Province (covering present-day Sichuan and Chongqing), as the Prefect of Mianzhu County (綿竹縣).

In 214, after the warlord Liu Bei seized control of Yi Province from Liu Zhang, Fei Shi came into the service of Liu Bei. Between 214 and 219, Fei Shi held a number of appointments in Liu Bei's administration, including Administrator (太守) of Zangke Commandery (牂牁郡). Around 219, after Liu Bei declared himself King of Hanzhong, he tasked Fei Shi with travelling to Jing Province to inform Guan Yu about his appointment as General of the Vanguard (前將軍). However, when Guan Yu learned that Huang Zhong would server as the General of the Rear (後將軍), he angrily said, "I would never allow myself to share the same rank as this old soldier!". He was adamant in his resolution not to accept the appointment.

Fei Shi, in order to convince Guan Yu, said to him :

“When one is looking to realize a hegemon's ambitions, he cannot have a one-track mind and must embrace multiple possibilities. During the Chu–Han Contention, Xiao He and Cao Can were long friends of Gaozu (Liu Bang) while Chen Ping (Han dynasty) and Han Xin served his archenemy and joined him far later. However, among them, the one to reach the highest rank was Han Xin, yet Xiao He and Cao Can never complained about this. Now that our King is at Hanzhong thanks to the great achievements of Huang Zhong, he must greatly honor Huang. Yet in his thoughts when weighing the importance of his officials, how can Huang Zhong be Your Lordship's equal? What's more, the King and Your Lordship are like one body, sharing happiness and sorrow, disaster and fortune. Now, for Your Lordship's sake, I humbly believe that it would not be appropriate to calculate the prestige of your office or the salary and rank that comes with it. However, I am just the emissary sent to present the office. If Your Lordship is resolute in your refusal, then I would return. It is only because I fear that you would later regret your actions that I am inflexible in my will!

After Guan Yu heard Fei Shi's argument, he was greatly moved and hurriedly accepted the appointment.

In 221, when Liu Bei declared himself emperor and established the Shu Han state, Fei Shi wrote a memorial to express his strong objection to Liu Bei's coronation. He argued that Liu Bei should not declare himself emperor until he had vanquished Shu's rival state, Cao Wei, which replaced the Eastern Han dynasty in 220; he cited the example of Liu Bang, the founder of the Han dynasty, who only declared himself emperor after defeating his rival Xiang Yu in the Chu–Han Contention. His memorial was as such :

“Your Highness, because of Cao Cao and Cao Pi forcing the abdication of the rightful ruler and stole the throne, therefore raised troops in all the Empire, and travelled and battled with the resolution to defeat the rebels. Yet the great enemy is not yet vanquished and one may fear that if you enthrone yourself so soon, the hearts of the people would not be ready. In the past, Gaozu agreed with Xiang Yu that the first to capture the capital of Qin would be titled King. Yet after long and arduous tasks and when he reached the capital, he was still hesitant to take the title. All the more for Your Highness in such a position, how can you wish to enthrone yourself? This is just honest advice from your foolish servant who believes that you should not act as such.

Liu Bei was so displeased that he had Fei Shi demoted to serve as a low-ranking official in Yongchang Commandery (永昌郡) in the remote southern parts of Shu.

Xi Zuochi, with regards to Fei Shi's outspoken and perhaps too honest opposition, commented: "Before establishing himself, a monarch must await the perfect conditions to lay the foundations for his state. However when a ruler desires to continue a previous dynasty, he must be swift to connect with the people's hearts. Therefore when Duke Hui of Jin was captured by his enemy, his son was already enthroned the next day. While Gengshi Emperor was still alive, Emperor Guangwu of Han already succeeded him. How could this be considered forgetting past customs for his own benefit? It is a matter of keeping the State's altars. Now, Xianzhu (Liu Bei) gathered many soldiers to defeat his enemy. The enemy is indeed strong and the task arduous, the previous ruler removed from his position and the State with no head, while the temples of the previous Han emperors no longer receive sacrifices. If not someone worthy and related took up the mantle, who would do it? Accepting succession and honoring the Heavens: how could this compare with Xiang Yu and how could Liu Bei refuse to take the now vacant throne? With this, Liu Bei could honor the previous emperors and with his example encourage others, unite his people toward a common goal which was the restoration of the Han and the destruction of the rebels. Not seeing that is indeed foolish. Therefore, Fei Shi's dismissal and demotion was appropriate!" Pei Songzhi agreed with Xi Zuochi's assessment.

In 225, Fei Shi accompanied Zhuge Liang on the southern campaign against rebel forces in southern Shu's Nanzhong region and when they returned and reached Hanyang County (漢陽縣) met a surrendered man named Li Hong (李鴻). When Li Hong met Zhuge Liang, Jiang Wan and Fei Shi were in attendance. Li Hong reported that he had recently met Meng Da; Wang Chong (王沖) who just recently deserted Shu told Meng that when Meng defected to Wei, (Note: Wang Chong was born in Guanghan Commandery (廣漢郡). He served as a General of Standard (牙門將) and was a subordinate of Li Yan when he was Commander (督) of Jiangzhou (江州; in present-day Chongqing). However, he was hated by Li Yan and in fear of punishment, Wang Chong surrendered to Wei. The Wei government appointed him as the Administrator of Leling (樂陵太守).) your enlightened excellency (Zhuge Liang) was very angry and wished to punish Meng Da's wives and children by association. However, Xianzhu (Liu Bei) refused to listen to your advice. When he heard this, Meng Da said that Your Excellency understood human nature and acting otherwise would then be against said human nature. He truly did not believe what Wang Chong said and greatly trusts and admire you. It is only that he has no way to return to you.

When he heard of this, Zhuge Liang told Jiang Wan and Fei Shi to return to the capital and start exchanging letters with Meng Da. Fei Shi replied that Meng Da was a petty man. While in the past, he betrayed a man lacking authority (Liu Zhang), he also betrayed Xianzhu. Meng has no firm allegiance; how is he worthy of exchanging letters with him (Fei Shi)? Zhang Liang was silent and could not answer.

Zhuge Liang wanted to convince Meng Da to help him from inside Wei and so with him exchange letters :

“During the previous years as I returned from the southern campaign at the end of the year, I encountered Li Hong at Hanyang and so heard of news about you. How you must endure this situation while hoping that it might change one day! Unfortunately Master Meng, this was truly Liu Feng's fault for offending you and so harming Xianzhu's reputation of treating scholars with respect. I also heard from Li Hong that Wang Chong spread lies, but you answered that you knew my feelings and so refused to believe him. When I see your trust, I wish to repair our old friendship and so regretfully look east, awaiting news of you.

Meng Da received letters from Zhuge Liang and began communicating with him. He told Zhuge that he wished to rebel against Wei. However, Wei sent Sima Yi to campaign against him and defeated then beheaded Meng Da. Due to the swift actions of Sima Yi and because he doubted the sincerity of Meng Da, Zhuge Liang did not rescue him.

When Zhuge Liang launched a series of military campaigns against Shu's rival state Wei, Fei Shi remained in the Shu capital Chengdu to handle domestic affairs. He was appointed as a Counsellor Remonstrant (諫議大夫) sometime after Zhuge Liang's death in 234, when Jiang Wan was the head of government in Shu. He died not long later.

Fei Shi had at least one son, Fei Li. Fei Li served as Cavalier Attendant-in-Ordinary (散騎常侍) under the Jin dynasty. Following his son, many of the reputed officials from Yi Province with the surname Fei (费) were his descendants.

== See also ==
- Lists of people of the Three Kingdoms
