= Yang Huai =

General serving under warlord Liu Zhang (died 213)

- 楊懷
- Monarch: Liu Zhang

Personal details
- Born: unknown
- Died: 213 (Note: Conflict between Liu Bei and Liu Zhang started with Zhang Song's death. The 17th year of the Jian'an era ended on 8 February 213 in the Julian calendar. Zhang Song's execution is one of the last recorded events of the year. Thus, Zhang Song likely died in January or February 213.)
- Occupation: General

Yang Huai (died 213) was a general military serving under Liu Zhang, ruler of Yi Province (present-day Sichuan and Chongqing), during the Three Kingdoms period of China.

== Life ==
Little is known of Yang Huai except that he, along with Gao Pei (高沛), were assigned to guard the Baishui Pass (白水關) from Zhang Lu in case of a sudden attack. However, Liu Bei, along with Pang Tong´s second plan of taking control of Liu Zhang's army's in the north, then moving to capture Chengdu's capital, caught Yang and Gao off guard. Before reinforcements could arrive, Yang and Gao were executed because they were disrespectful to him. Liu Bei took the pass's garrison into his army and proceeded to attack Fu County (涪縣; in present-day Fuling District, Chongqing). (Note: In 213 Gao Pei was a general of Liu Zhang in Ba commandery. As Liu Bei prepared to turn against Liu Zhang he arrested Gao Pei and his colleague Yang Huai, charged them with a lack of courtesy and killed them.)

== In Romance of the Three Kingdoms ==
In the 14th-century historical novel Romance of the Three Kingdoms, the story was a little different. When Liu Bei arrived at the pass, both Yang Huai and Gao Pei had feigned their surrender and planned on assassinating Liu Bei; however, Pang Tong's insight had revealed their intentions to Liu Bei, and Yang and Gao were executed.
