= List of fictitious stories in Romance of the Three Kingdoms =

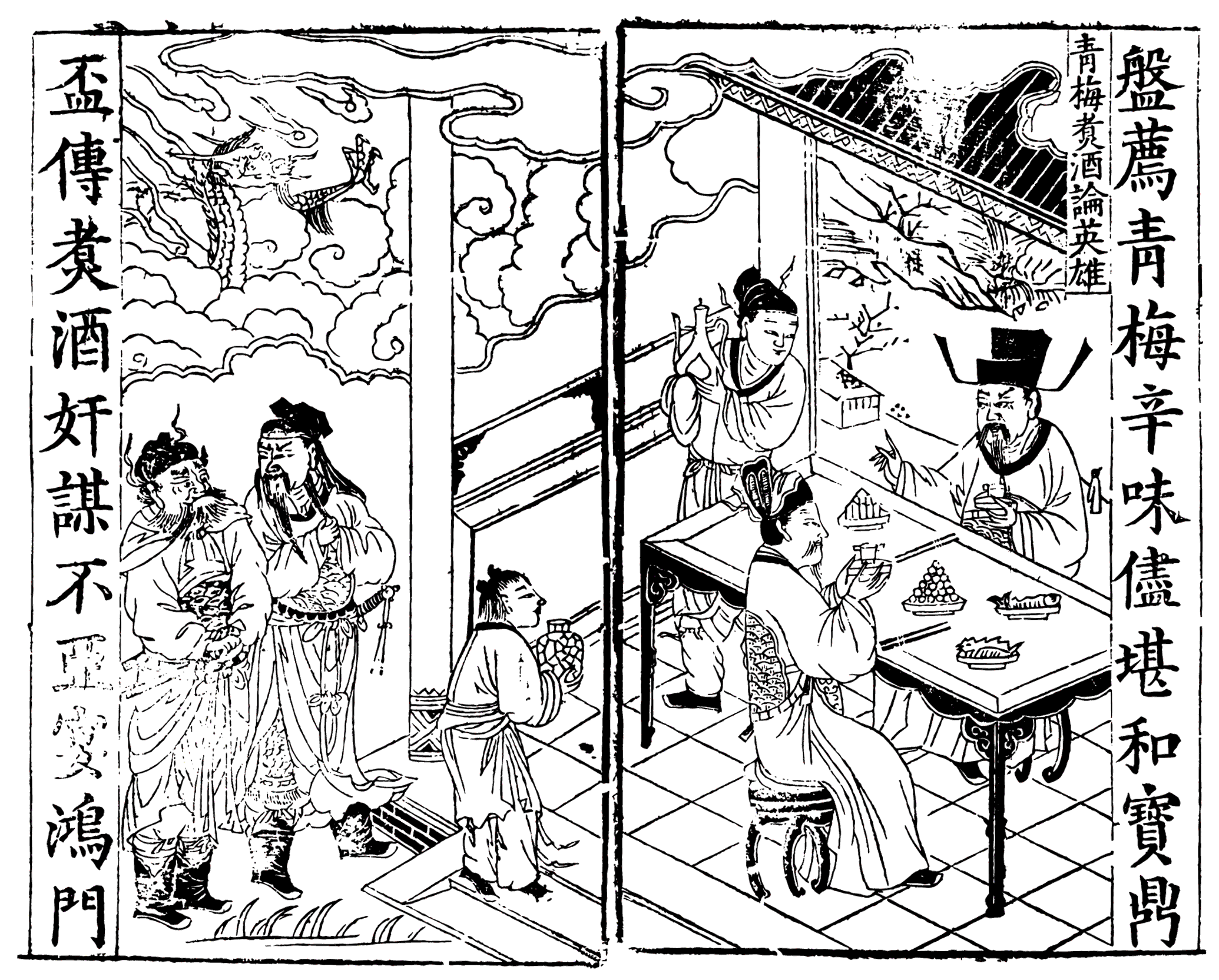
An illustration from a Ming dynasty edition of Romance of the Three Kingdoms.

The following is a chronologically arranged list of apocryphal stories in the 14th century novel Romance of the Three Kingdoms (Sanguo Yanyi), one of the Four Great Classical Novels of Chinese literature. Although the novel is a romanticised and highly fictionalised retelling of the fall of the Eastern Han dynasty and subsequent Three Kingdoms period, due to its immense esteem and popularity, many people mistake it for an accurate historical account of the era. Furthermore, many of the stories were used as moral lessons over the centuries as well as the subject of historical and current art.

The primary historical sources for the Three Kingdoms period are found in the Twenty-Four Histories, namely Fan Ye's Book of the Later Han, Chen Shou's Records of the Three Kingdoms (including annotations by Pei Songzhi from other historical texts such as Yu Huan's Weilüe and the Jiang Biao Zhuan), and Fang Xuanling's Book of Jin. Since Romance is a historical novel, many stories in it are dramatised or imaginative, or based on folk tales and historical incidents that happened in other periods of Chinese history. What follows is an incomplete list of the better known of such stories in the novel, each with accompanying text that explains the differences between the story and historical accounts.

== Oath of the Peach Garden ==
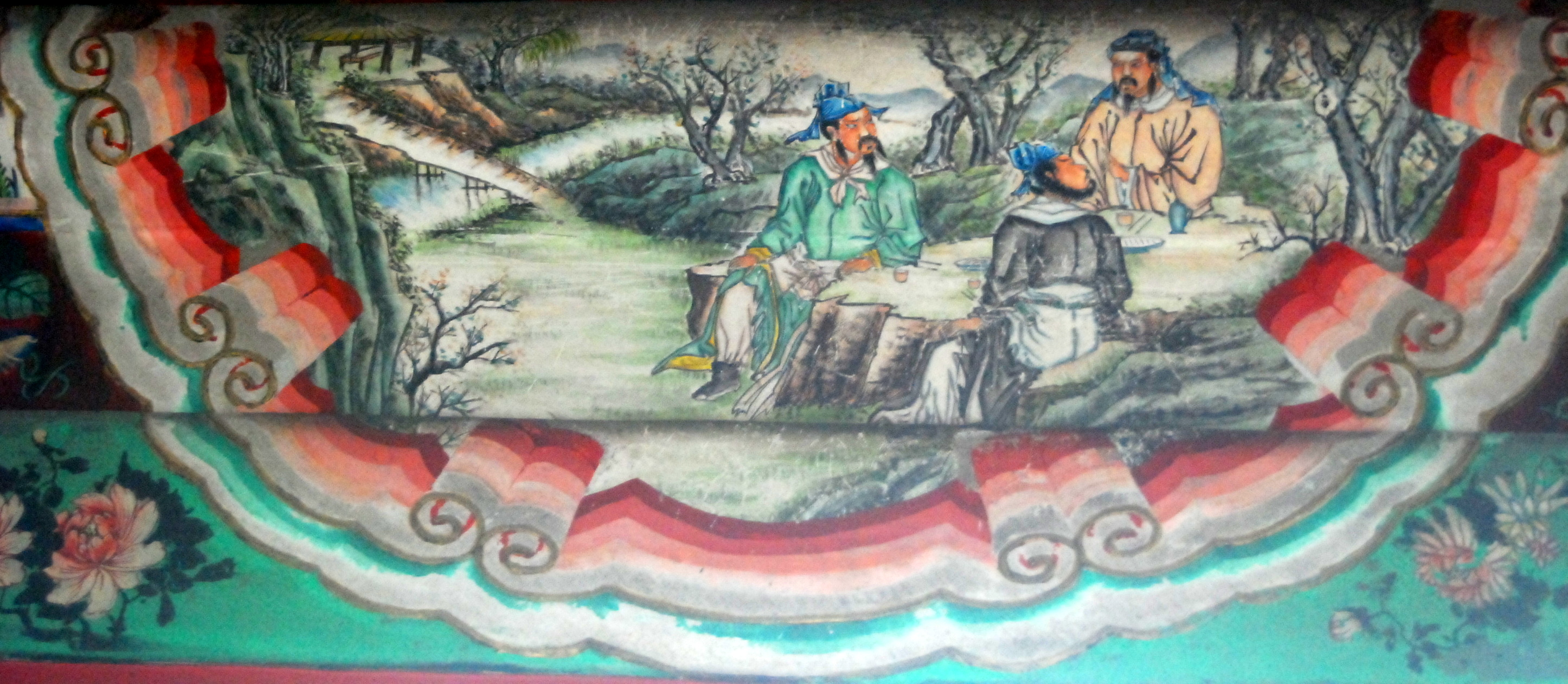
Oath of the Peach Garden, portrait at the Long Corridor of the Summer Palace, Beijing

With the onset of the Yellow Turban Rebellion, Liu Bei meets Zhang Fei and shares with him his aspirations of saving the country and the people. Zhang suggests they should together recruit a voluntary militia to fight the rebellion. They are later joined by Guan Yu, who was on his way to join the army. The three men perform a sacrificial ceremony to heaven and earth and take the oath as brothers under blossoming peach trees in Zhang's garden, assembling the dynamics between them for the remainder of the novel.

Historicity

There is no historical evidence to suggest that an oath was taken between the three men. However, Guan Yu's biography in Records describes their relationship "as close as brothers," to the point of "sharing the same bed." Zhang Fei's biography suggests that as Guan was older than Zhang, Zhang regarded Guan as an elder brother.

== Zhang Fei thrashes the imperial inspector ==
A commandery-level inspector is sent to survey Liu Bei's county after Liu Bei is appointed as a county prefect as a reward for helping to suppress the Yellow Turban Rebellion. The inspector hints to Liu Bei that he wants a bribe, but Liu Bei does not understand the inspector's point. Later, even after his assistant explains to him, Liu Bei still refuses to bribe the inspector. When the inspector is unable to find any fault with Liu Bei's administration, he attempts to intimidate the locals into making false accusations against Liu Bei. Zhang Fei is furious when he hears about this and he barges into the county office, drags the inspector out, ties him to a post and gives him a severe thrashing. Liu Bei shows up and stops Zhang Fei. When Guan Yu suggests they kill the inspector and seek their fortune elsewhere, Liu Bei refuses, resigns and returns his official seal to the inspector before leaving.

Historicity

Records and Yu Huan's lost history Dianlue recorded that Liu Bei was the one who beat up the inspector. The Han central government had issued an imperial edict to dismiss all officials who received their appointments as rewards for their contributions in battle. Liu Bei knew that he was one such official. When a commandery-level inspector was sent to the county to formally dismiss him, Liu Bei sought a private meeting with the inspector. However, the inspector claimed that he was ill and refused to meet Liu Bei. An angry Liu Bei then gathered his men, barged into the inspector's quarters, and falsely announced that he had received a secret order from the commandery administrator to arrest the inspector. He tied the inspector to a tree, took out his official seal and hung it on the inspector's neck, and flogged the inspector over 100 times. He wanted to kill the inspector but eventually released him when the latter pleaded for mercy. He went on the run after that.

== Cao Cao presents a precious sword ==
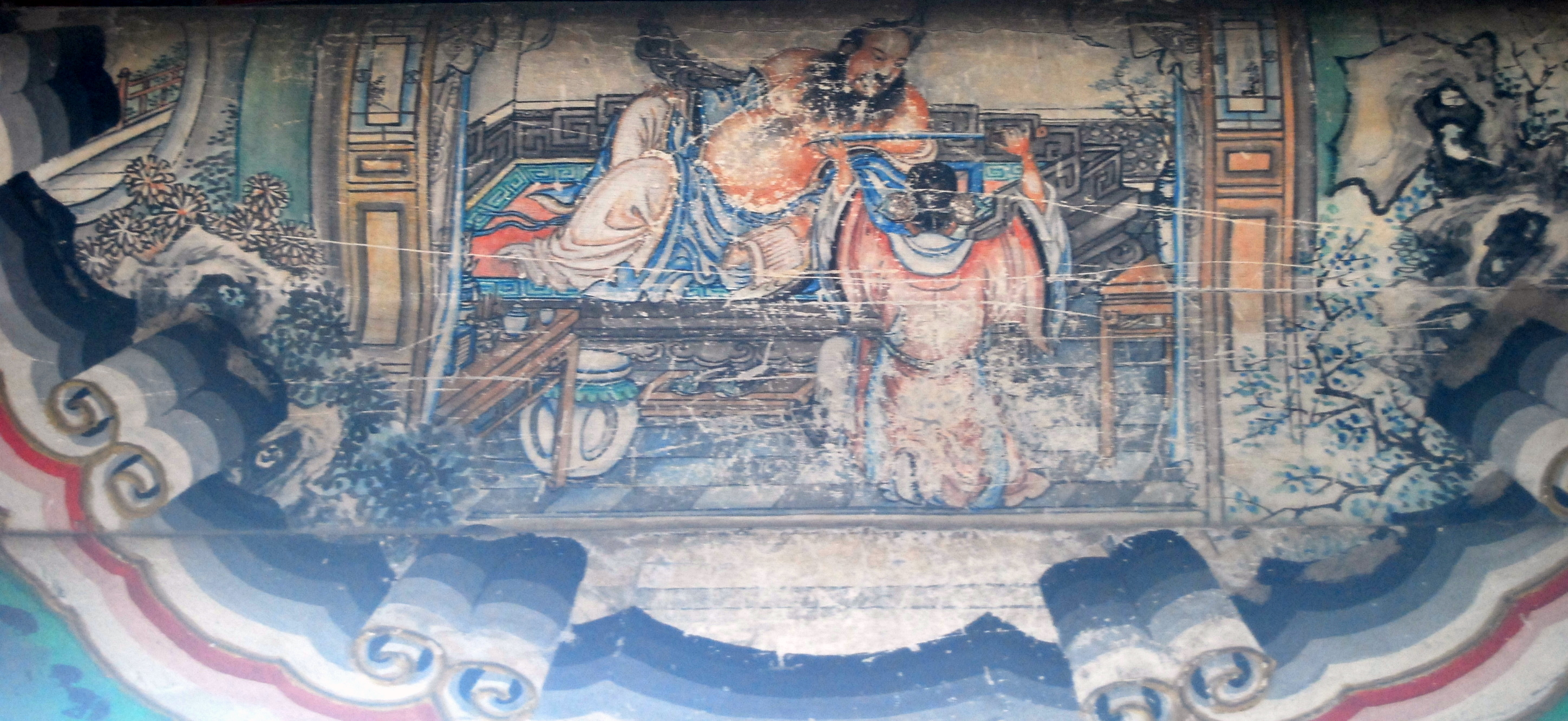
Cao Cao presents a sword (孟德獻刀), portrait at the Long Corridor of the Summer Palace, Beijing

Wang Yun lends Cao Cao his Seven Gems Sword after the latter pledges to assassinate Dong Zhuo. Cao Cao meets Dong Zhuo in his bedroom the following day and attempts to kill him with the sword when he faces away. However, Dong Zhuo sees Cao Cao drawing his sword through a reflection in a mirror and immediately turns back. Cao Cao senses trouble so he quickly kneels down and pretends to present the sword to Dong Zhuo as a gift. At the same time, Lü Bu has returned after Dong Zhuo sent him to choose a new horse for Cao Cao. Cao Cao then lies that he wants to test-ride the new horse and uses the opportunity to escape from Luoyang.

Historicity

Cao Cao's biography in Records states that Dong Zhuo wanted to appoint Cao Cao as a cavalry colonel (驍騎校尉) in his army. Cao Cao refused because he felt that Dong Zhuo was doomed to failure, so he disguised himself and escaped back to his hometown. There is no mention of Cao Cao attempting to assassinate Dong Zhuo before his escape.

== Cao Cao arrested and released by Chen Gong ==
Cao Cao flees from the capital, Luoyang, after failing to assassinate Dong Zhuo. Dong Zhuo orders notices for Cao Cao's arrest to be put around the areas surrounding Luoyang. During his escape, Cao Cao is spotted in Zhongmu County by the county prefect, Chen Gong, who arrests him. Chen Gong has a private conversation with Cao Cao and decides to release him after feeling inspired by his sense of righteousness. Chen Gong even gives up his official post and becomes Cao Cao's companion.

Historicity

Records states that when Cao Cao passed by Zhongmu County, a patrol officer suspected that he was a fugitive and arrested him. However, Cao Cao was released later after another official recognised him. There is no evidence that Cao Cao attempted to assassinate Dong Zhuo before his arrest and the patrol officer's name is not recorded in history. Besides, in Cao Cao's biography, Chen Gong is first mentioned only after Liu Dai's death in 192 when he urged Cao Cao to assume governorship of Yan Province (covering present-day southwestern Shandong and eastern Henan). This happened two years after the Campaign against Dong Zhuo started in 190. As such, it contradicts the story in Romance because, in the novel, Cao Cao launches the campaign only after he kills Lü Boshe in Chen Gong's presence (see the article on Lü Boshe) and returns to his hometown in Chenliu (陳留; in present-day Kaifeng, Henan).

== Guan Yu slays Hua Xiong ==
In Chapter 5, as warlords from the east of Hangu Pass form a coalition against Dong Zhuo, Hua Xiong stations at Sishui Pass to ward off the oncoming attack. When Lü Bu requests to lead troops to attack the enemy, Hua Xiong steps in and says, "An ox-cleaver to kill a chicken! There is no need for the General to go. I will cut off their heads as easily as I would take a thing out of my pocket!" Dong Zhuo then puts Hua Xiong in charge.

Having single-handedly slain four warriors from the coalition – Zu Mao (祖茂), Pan Feng (潘鳳), Bao Zhong (鮑忠), and Yu She (俞涉) – Hua Xiong seems invincible. Despite mistrust from many warlords of the coalition, most notably their leader Yuan Shao, Guan Yu volunteers to fight Hua Xiong. To convince them to give him the opportunity, he tells them that if he fails to defeat Hua Xiong, the coalition can take his head as punishment. When Cao Cao pours Guan Yu a cup of warm wine, Guan Yu puts it on hold and says he will return very soon victorious. As promised, Guan Yu returns quickly with Hua Xiong's head, whilst Cao Cao who was still holding the cup of wine, realised just how quickly it took Guan Yu to slay the notorious General Hua Xiong. Cao Cao then gives the cup of wine - still warm - to Guan Yu who gulps down the wine victoriously. This is known as "Wen Jiu Zhan Hua Xiong" (溫酒斬華雄), which roughly translates to 'Slaying Hua Xiong over (a cup of) warm wine'.

Historicity

According to Records, Hua Xiong was defeated and killed in a battle at Yangren (陽人; believed to be near present-day Wenquan, Ruzhou, Henan) against Sun Jian. Zu Mao was mentioned to lure away Dong Zhuo's army by wearing Sun Jian's red scarf but there was no mention of his death.

== Battle of Hulao Pass ==
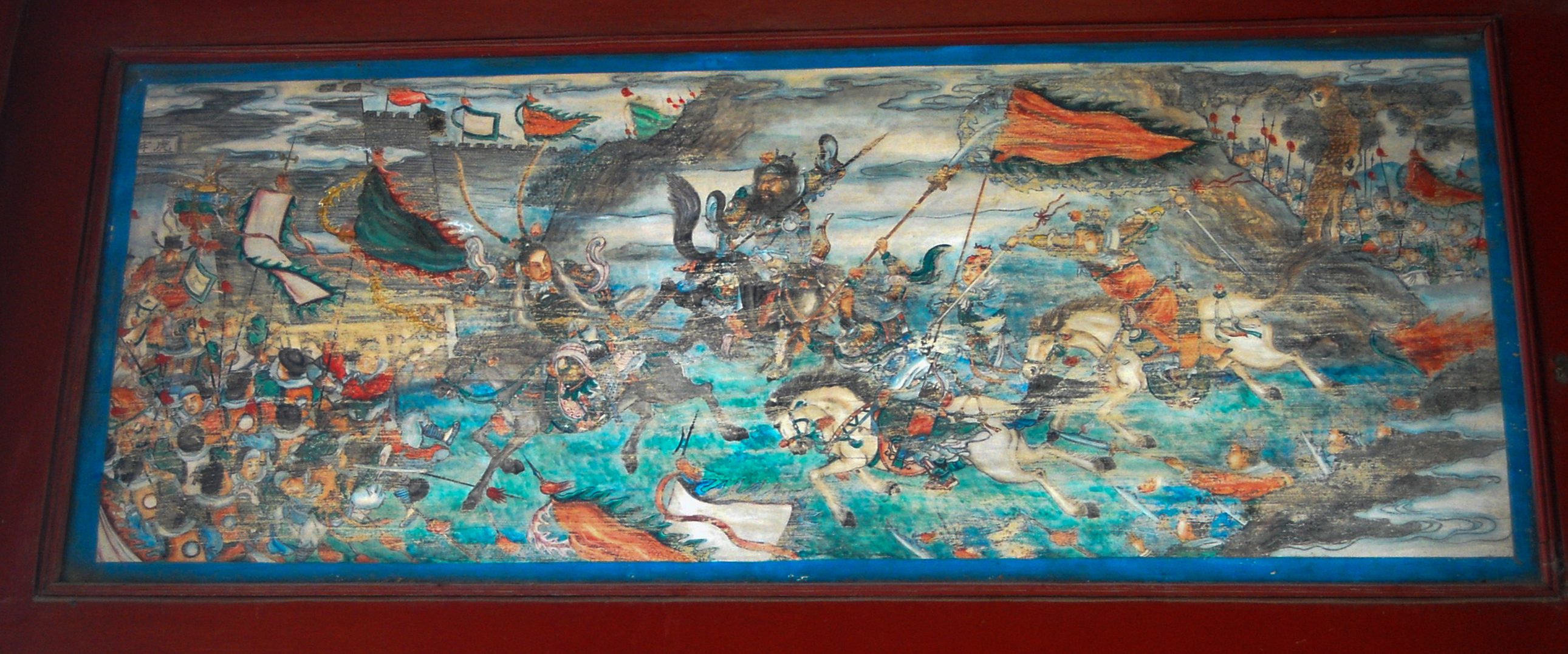
Three Heroes fight Lü Bu (三英戰呂布), portrait at the Long Corridor of the Summer Palace, Beijing

After capturing Sishui Pass, the coalition forces then march on to Hulao Pass, situated some 50 li away from Luoyang.

Dong Zhuo personally leads an army of 150,000 men with Lü Bu, Li Ru, Fan Chou, and Zhang Ji east to Hulao Pass, while sending 50,000 men under Li Jue and Guo Si to reinforce Sishui Pass. Once at Hulao Pass, Dong Zhuo orders Lü Bu to lead the vanguard with 30,000 men and set camp in front of the fortified pass.

The coalition decides to send half of their forces to engage Dong Zhuo's forces. Eight coalition warlords—Wang Kuang, Qiao Mao, Bao Xin, Yuan Yi, Kong Rong, Zhang Yang, Tao Qian, and Gongsun Zan—each leads their forces towards Hulao Pass under Yuan Shao's command. The first to arrive in Hulao Pass is Wang Kuang, where one of his generals, Fang Yue, volunteers to duel Lü Bu. In less than five rounds, Fang Yue is killed, and Lü Bu charges through Wang Kuang's force, killing several of the routing soldiers. The forces of Qiao Mao and Yuan Yi come to Wang Kuang's rescue. They decide to withdraw 30 li from the pass and set camp there.

Soon, the remaining five coalition warlords arrive at the camp, where they discuss and conclude that Lü Bu can be defeated by anyone. Just then, Lü Bu's men array outside the coalition camp, and the eight coalition warlords go to meet the enemy. Mu Shun, a general under Zhang Yang, charges towards Lü Bu, but is immediately killed. Wu Anguo, a general under Kong Rong, then proceeds to challenge Lü Bu. They fight for ten rounds, but then Lü Bu slits off Wu Anguo's wrist with his ji. The coalition forces charge out and rescue Wu Anguo, and each side retreat to their own camps. Cao Cao comments that all the eighteen warlords must gather together to discuss a plan to defeat Lü Bu, and that if Lü Bu is defeated, Dong Zhuo will be easy to kill.

Just then, Lü Bu comes out again to taunt the coalition. This time, Gongsun Zan goes to challenge Lü Bu, but has to withdraw after a few rounds. Lü Bu gives chase, but he is distracted by Zhang Fei, who calls him "a slave with three surnames" (三姓家奴; the "three surnames" refer to Lü Bu's original surname and those of his two foster fathers). Lü Bu then battles Zhang Fei for 50 rounds, with neither gaining an advantage over the other. Following that, Guan Yu, brandishing his Green Dragon Crescent Blade, dashes out to assist Zhang Fei. The three fighters are engaged in another 30 bouts or so when Liu Bei, holding up a pair of swords, also joins in the fray.

The three sworn brothers encircle Lü Bu and take turns to attack him from different directions. Lü Bu is unable to defeat all three opponents so he pretends to attack Liu Bei and escapes through the gap when Liu dodges his attack. Lü Bu then flees back to Hulao Pass, with the three brothers hot on pursuit, but they cannot catch up with him because of the speed of his horse, the Red Hare. They abandon the chase after they spot Dong Zhuo. Zhang Fei attempts to charge onto the fortification to kill Dong Zhuo, but is driven back by a rain of arrows from the pass.

The coalition warlords declare the battle won, and receive Liu Bei, Guan Yu and Zhang Fei for a celebration of their victory.

Historicity

There is no historical record of any engagement taking place at Hulao Pass during that period of time. Hulao Pass was an alternative name of Sishui Pass.

In the novel, Liu Bei, Guan Yu and Zhang Fei participated in the campaign under Gongsun Zan's banner, but Records did not mention Gongsun Zan's involvement in the campaign.

Historically, however, there were confrontations between the coalition and Dong Zhuo in which both Dong Zhuo and Lü Bu had participated in personally, with only Sun Jian's forces present on the coalition side. Dong Zhuo's biography in Later Han stated that Lü Bu was defeated in battle twice by Sun Jian:

- The first time was at Yangren (陽人; believed to be near present-day Wenquan, Ruzhou, Henan), when Dong Zhuo sent Lü Bu and Hu Zhen to attack Sun Jian. Lü Bu and Hu Zhen could not get along with each other, leading to disorder in their army, so Sun Jian used the opportunity to attack them and forced them to retreat.
- The second time was in Luoyang, where Dong Zhuo personally led an army to engage Sun Jian's forces in the area where the tombs of the Han emperors were located. Dong Zhuo was defeated and he retreated. Sun Jian then entered Luoyang's Xuanyang Gate (宣陽城門), where he attacked Lü Bu and drove him back.

== Diaochan ==
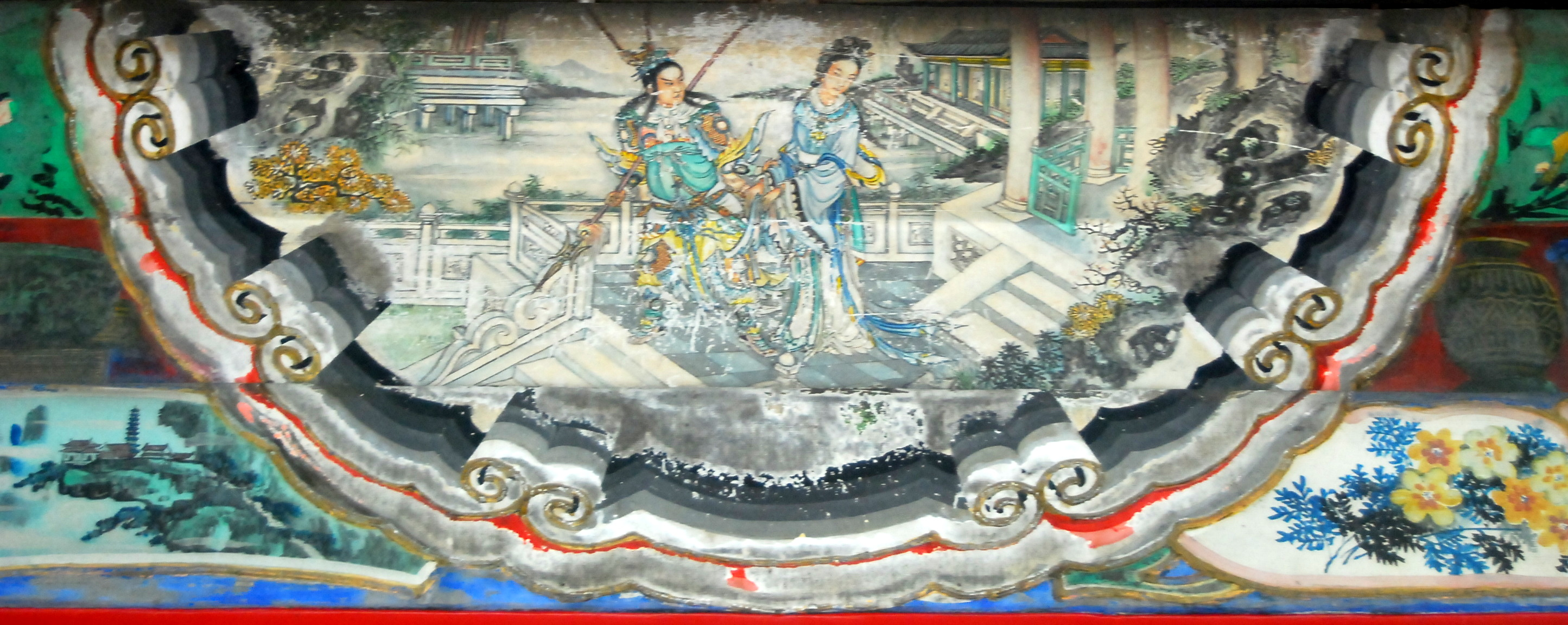
Lü Bu flirts with Diaochan (呂布戲貂嬋), portrait at the Long Corridor of the Summer Palace, Beijing

Diaochan is a fictional character introduced in the novel. Today regarded as one of the four beauties of China, her foster father Wang Yun betroths her to both Lü Bu and Dong Zhuo in an elaborate coup d'état attempt against Dong, which succeeds when the tension she creates between them eventually leads Lü to assassinate him.

Historicity

Lü's biographies in Records and Later Han mention that he had an affair with one of Dong's maids, and was afraid that Dong would find out. Besides, he already bore a grudge against Dong, who threw jis (a type of halberd) at him on some occasions to vent his frustration, but Lü dodged the weapons and Dong's anger subsided. Furthermore, Wang is known to have been involved in persuading Lü to assassinate Dong, and was himself killed when Dong's followers staged a counter coup in Changan, while Lü fled the city. There is no historical evidence to support any connection between Dong's maid and Wang, or the maid's name being "Diaochan;" the name first appeared in Sanguozhi Pinghua in 1321 as a pet name of Lü's wife, and likely referred to the sable (貂; diao) tails and jade decorations in the shape of cicadas (蟬; chan), which at the time adorned the headgear of high-ranking government officials.

== Battle of Puyang ==
The Battle of Puyang, where Cao Cao's forces laid siege on Lü Bu in Puyang (濮陽), was described in Chapter 12. Chen Gong, who was then serving Lü Bu, plotted to lure Cao Cao into the city by having a local send a letter to Cao Cao feigning to collude with the latter. The delighted Cao Cao personally led a force deep into the city before realising he had fallen into a trap. At a signal, fires were lit at all the city gates and Lü Bu's troops cut off the evasion routes. Cao Cao barely escaped with his life in the battle and had a narrow face-to-face encounter with Lü Bu, who did not recognise him and allowed him to slip away. Later in Chapter 60, when Zhang Song visited Cao Cao as an emissary from the warlord Liu Zhang, he mocked Cao Cao's past failures by mentioning the Battle of Puyang and other notable battles that Cao Cao lost.

Historicity

Sima Guang's 1084 chronicle Zizhi Tongjian recorded a similar anecdote which happened in 194 (1st year of the Xingping era). This record in Tongjian did not mention Chen Gong having any involvement in Cao's capture.

== Guan Yu's three conditions ==
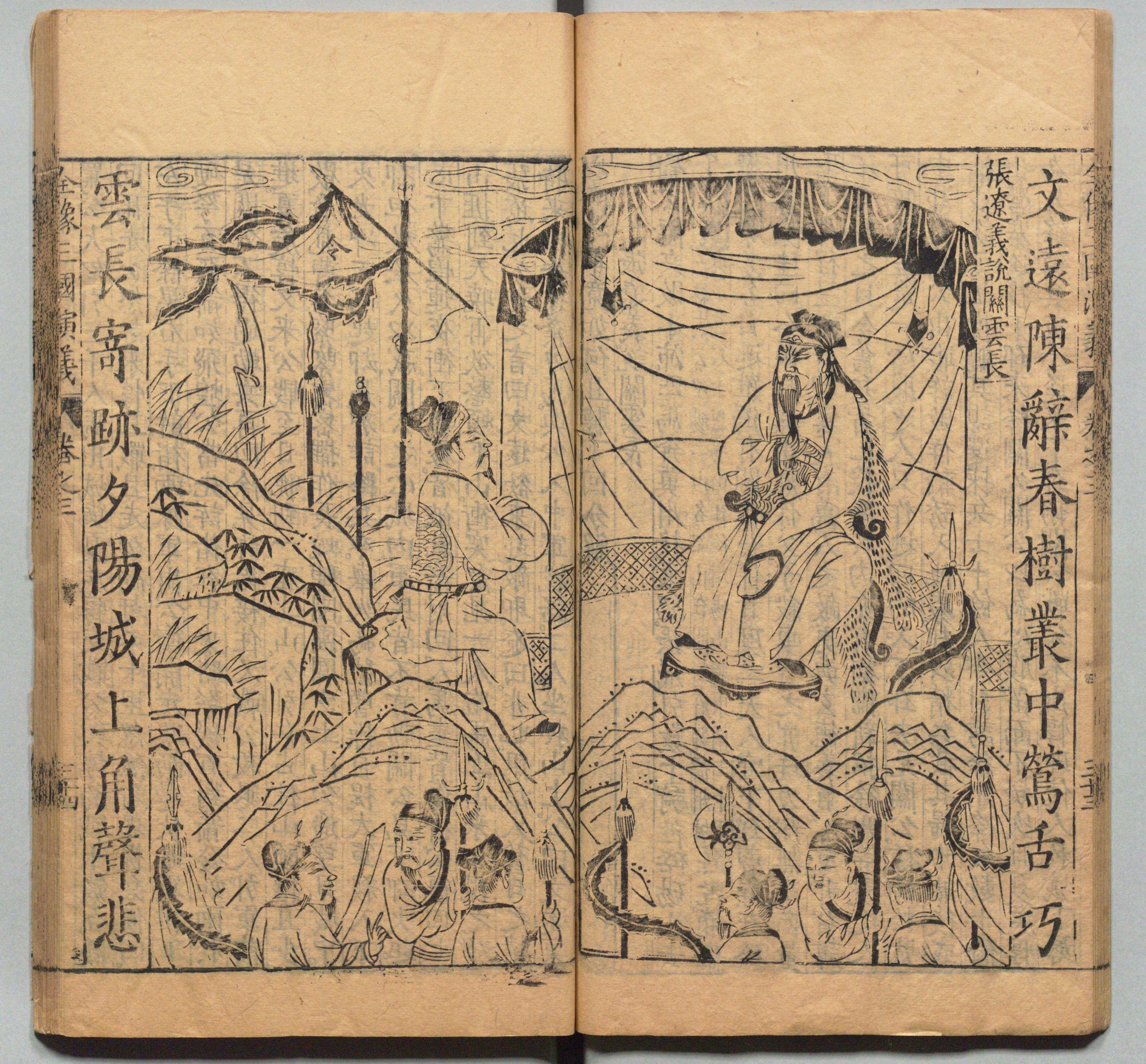
Ming dynasty woodblock print of Guan Yu giving his three conditions to Zhang Liao.

Cao Cao and Liu Bei join forces to attack Lü Bu in Xu Province (covering parts of present-day Shandong and Jiangsu) and defeat him at the Battle of Xiapi. Cao Cao appoints Che Zhou (車冑) as the governor of Xu Province. Liu Bei later breaks ties with Cao Cao and seizes control of Xu Province after Guan Yu kills Che Zhou. Cao Cao leads an army to attack Liu Bei and take back Xu Province. In one battle, Liu Bei and Zhang Fei lead a force to attack Cao Cao's camp but fall into an ambush and are separated during the chaos. Guan Yu, who remained behind to defend Xiapi (Xu Province's capital), is lured out of the city and isolated on a small hill. Cao Cao's forces take control of Xiapi and capture Liu Bei's spouses. Cao Cao sends Zhang Liao to ask Guan Yu to surrender. Guan Yu agrees to surrender, provided the following three conditions are fulfilled:

1. Liu Bei's spouses are not harmed and are treated well.
2. In name, Guan Yu surrenders to the Emperor and not to Cao Cao.
3. Guan Yu is allowed to leave and reunite with Liu Bei as soon as he has news of Liu Bei's whereabouts.

Cao Cao agrees to the three conditions. Guan Yu serves under him temporarily before leaving to rejoin Liu Bei later.

Historicity

Guan Yu's biography in Records states that Liu Bei launched a surprise attack on Xu Province and killed Che Zhou. He then placed Guan Yu in charge of Xiapi while he moved to Xiaopei. In 200, Cao Cao led an army east to attack Liu Bei and defeated him. Liu Bei fled to join Yuan Shao. Guan Yu was captured by Cao Cao's forces and brought back to Xuchang, where Cao appointed him as a lieutenant-general (偏將軍) and treated him well. There is no mention of Guan Yu surrendering nor any conditions named by Guan before he agreed to surrender.

== Guan Yu slays Yan Liang and Wen Chou ==
Before the Battle of Guandu between Yuan Shao and Cao Cao, both sides have already engaged in two skirmishes: the Battle of Boma and Battle of Yan Ford. Yuan Shao sends his general Yan Liang to attack Cao Cao's fortress at Boma (白馬; near present-day Hua County, Henan). During the battle, one of Cao Cao's best warriors, Xu Huang, goes forth to take up Yan Liang's challenge but is defeated by him. Cao Cao reluctantly allows Guan Yu to fight Yan Liang. Guan slays Yan with the help of the Red Hare Horse, and the siege on Boma is lifted as a result. Wen Chou later comes to avenge Yan Liang at Yan Ford (延津; north of present-day Yanjin County, Henan), fighting off Xu Huang and Zhang Liao, but is also slain by Guan Yu in a rout.

Historicity

Guan Yu's biography in Records mentions that Yuan Shao ordered Yan Liang to besiege Cao Cao's general Liu Yan (劉延) at Boma. Cao Cao then sent Zhang Liao and Guan Yu to lead the vanguard force to attack Yan Liang. During the battle, Guan Yu spotted Yan Liang and charged through enemy lines towards him, killed him and took his head. Yuan Shao's other generals were unable to resist the assault and the siege on Boma was thus lifted. Yuan Shao's biography mentions that after Yan Liang's death, Yuan Shao's army crossed the Yellow River to the south of Yan Ford, where he sent Liu Bei and Wen Chou to attack Cao Cao. They were defeated and Wen Chou was killed in battle (nothing is mentioned about him being slain by Guan Yu). Yuan Shao launched another attack but was defeated again and his generals were captured by Cao Cao.

== Guan Yu crosses five passes and slays six generals ==
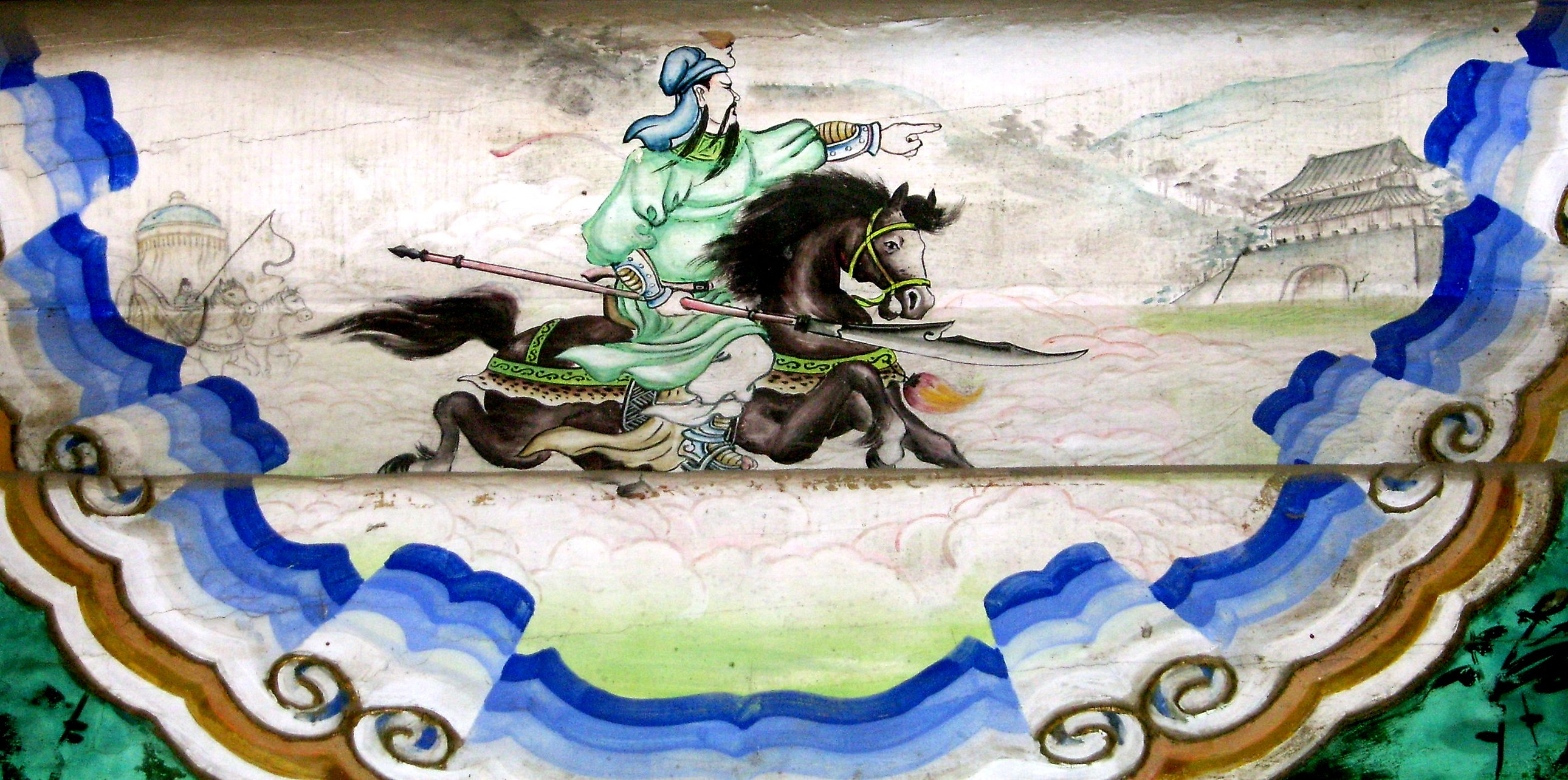
A mural of Guan Yu's "Riding Alone for Thousands of Miles" (千里走單騎) in the Summer Palace, Beijing.

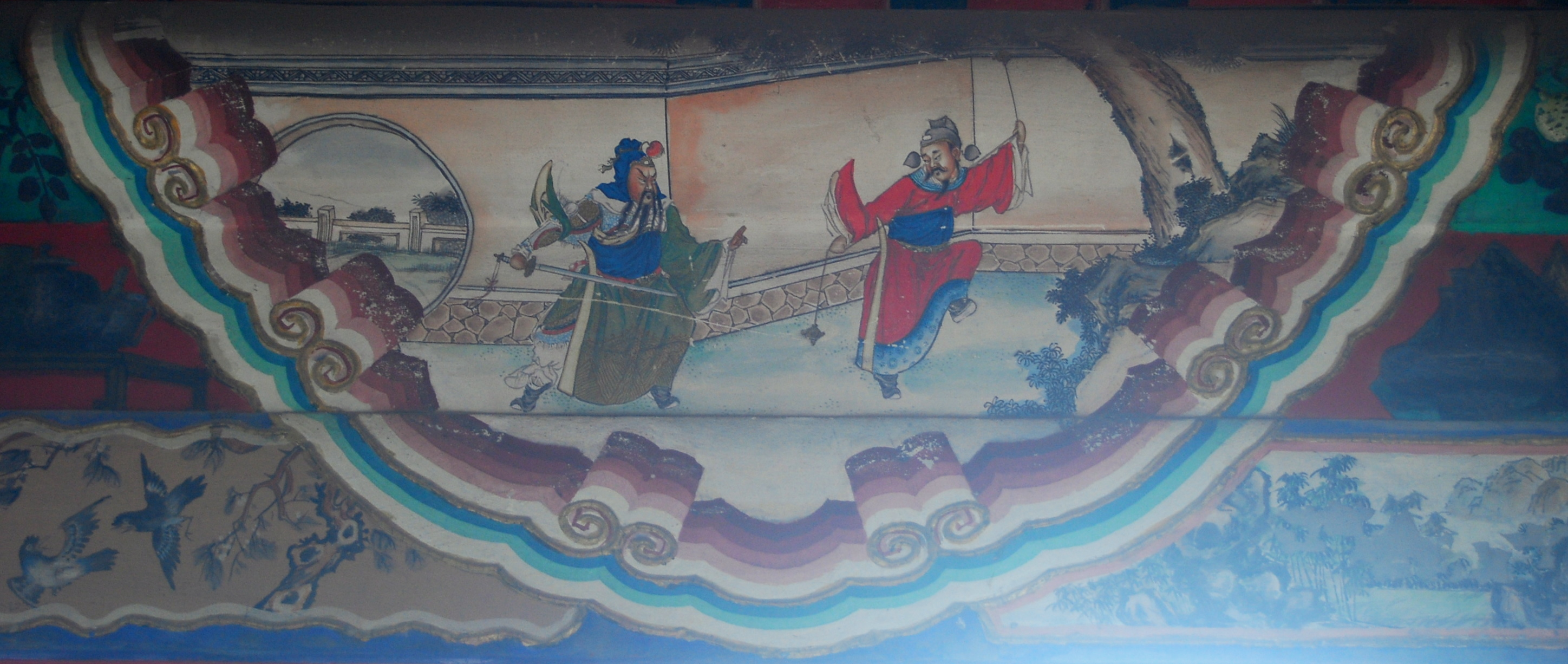
Guan Yu slays Bian Xi, portrait at the Long Corridor of the Summer Palace, Beijing

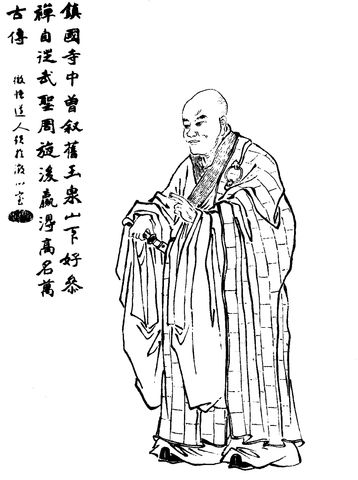
A Qing dynasty illustration of the monk Pujing.

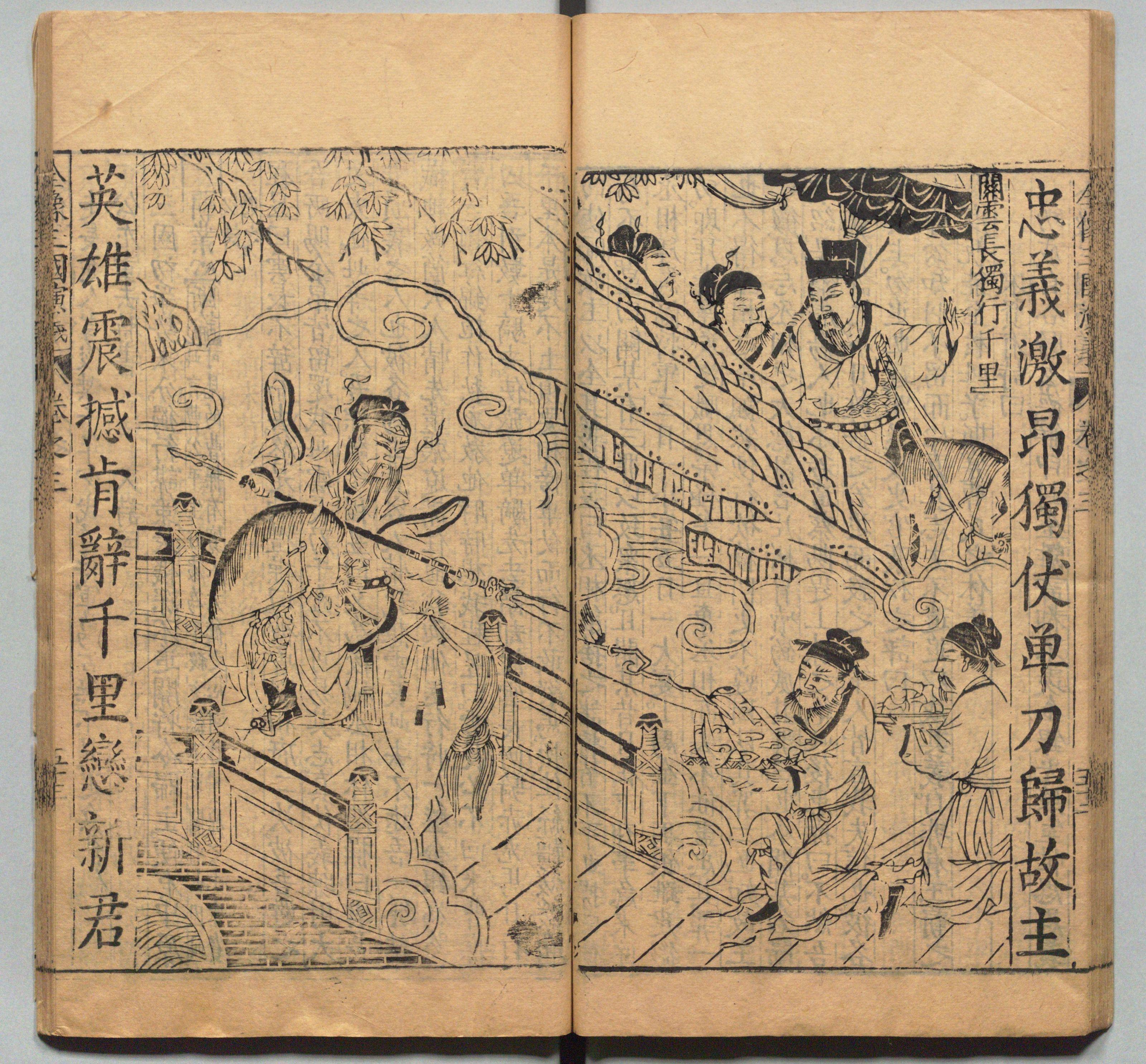
Ming dynasty woodblock illustration of Guan Yu receiving Cao Cao's gift of robe.

Guan Yu receives news that Liu Bei is alive and currently in Yuan Shao's camp. He decides to leave Cao Cao with Liu Bei's wives to rejoin his sworn brother. He tries to bid Cao Cao farewell personally before leaving, but Cao Cao does not give him the chance to do so. Frustrated, Guan Yu eventually writes a farewell letter to Cao Cao and leaves. He takes with him none of the luxuries and gifts Cao Cao gave him, except the Red Hare. He even gives up his peerage (Marquis of Hanshou Village) and leaves his official seal behind. Cao Cao's subordinates feel that Guan Yu is rude and arrogant because he left without bidding farewell, so they ask for permission to pursue him, capture him and bring him back. Cao Cao disapproves because he knows that none of them can stop Guan Yu, and he gives orders for the officials along the way to give passage to Guan Yu and his companions.

Guan Yu rides beside the carriage carrying Liu Bei's wives and escorts them along the way. The first pass they reach is Dongling Pass (south of present-day Dengfeng, Henan). Kong Xiu, the officer guarding the pass, denies Guan Yu passage because Guan Yu does not have an exit permit with him. Guan Yu then kills Kong Xiu and forces his way through the pass.

They reach the city of Luoyang next. The governor Han Fu leads 1,000 men to block Guan Yu. Han Fu's deputy Meng Tan challenges Guan Yu to a duel but ends up being sliced in two. While Guan Yu is fighting with Meng Tan, Han Fu secretly takes aim and fires an arrow at Guan. The arrow hits Guan Yu's arm and wounds him, but Guan Yu pulls out the arrow from his wound, charges towards Han Fu and kills him. The shocked soldiers immediately give way and Guan Yu's party passes through safely.

Guan Yu's party arrives at Sishui Pass (north of present-day Xingyang, Henan). Bian Xi, the officer guarding the pass, receives them warmly and invites Guan Yu to a feast at the temple outside the pass. In fact, Bian Xi had ordered 200 men to wait in ambush inside the temple and kill Guan Yu when he gives a signal. Pujing, an elderly monk from the same hometown as Guan Yu, subtly warns Guan Yu about Bian Xi's plot. Guan Yu senses the danger, kills Bian Xi and passes through Sishui Pass safely.

Wang Zhi, the governor of Xingyang, adopts a similar scheme to kill Guan Yu. Like Bian Xi, he pretends to welcome Guan Yu and leads them to a courier station, where they will stay that night. After that, Wang Zhi orders his subordinate Hu Ban to lead 1,000 men to surround the station and set it on fire in the middle of the night. Curious to know what Guan Yu looks like, Hu Ban sneaks in and peeps at Guan Yu, who is reading inside his room. Guan Yu notices Hu Ban and invites him in. Guan Yu met Hu Ban's father earlier and has with him a letter from Hu Ban's father addressed to his son. He gives the letter to Hu Ban. After reading his father's letter, Hu Ban changes his mind and decides to help Guan Yu. He reveals Wang Zhi's plot to Guan Yu and secretly opens the city gates for Guan Yu and his companions to leave. Wang Zhi and his soldiers catch up with them a while later but Guan Yu turns back and kills him.

Guan Yu's party finally arrives at a ferry crossing on the southern bank of the Yellow River. Qin Qi, the officer in charge, refuses to allow them to cross the river and is killed by Guan Yu in anger. Guan Yu and his party then cross the river safely and enter Yuan Shao's territory. However, they soon realise that Liu Bei is no longer with Yuan Shao and has already left for Runan. Guan Yu and his party then make their way back and are finally reunited with Liu Bei and Zhang Fei at Gucheng.

During this journey, Guan Yu meets many men who would become his subordinates and remain loyal to him until his death. They include Liao Hua, Zhou Cang and Guan Ping (whom he adopts as his son).

Historicity

Guan Yu's biography in Records provides a similar account of the reasons for Guan Yu's departure and the events that happened before he left Cao Cao. However, it does not mention anything about Guan Yu crossing the five passes, nor about the six officers (Kong Xiu, Meng Tan, Han Fu, Bian Xi, Wang Zhi and Qin Qi). Indeed, had five passes been true, Guan would have taken a V-shaped detour. Novelist and playwright Ma Boyong argues Guan had to go to Luoyang since it is one of the best-known cities.

== Guan Yu slays Cai Yang at Gucheng ==
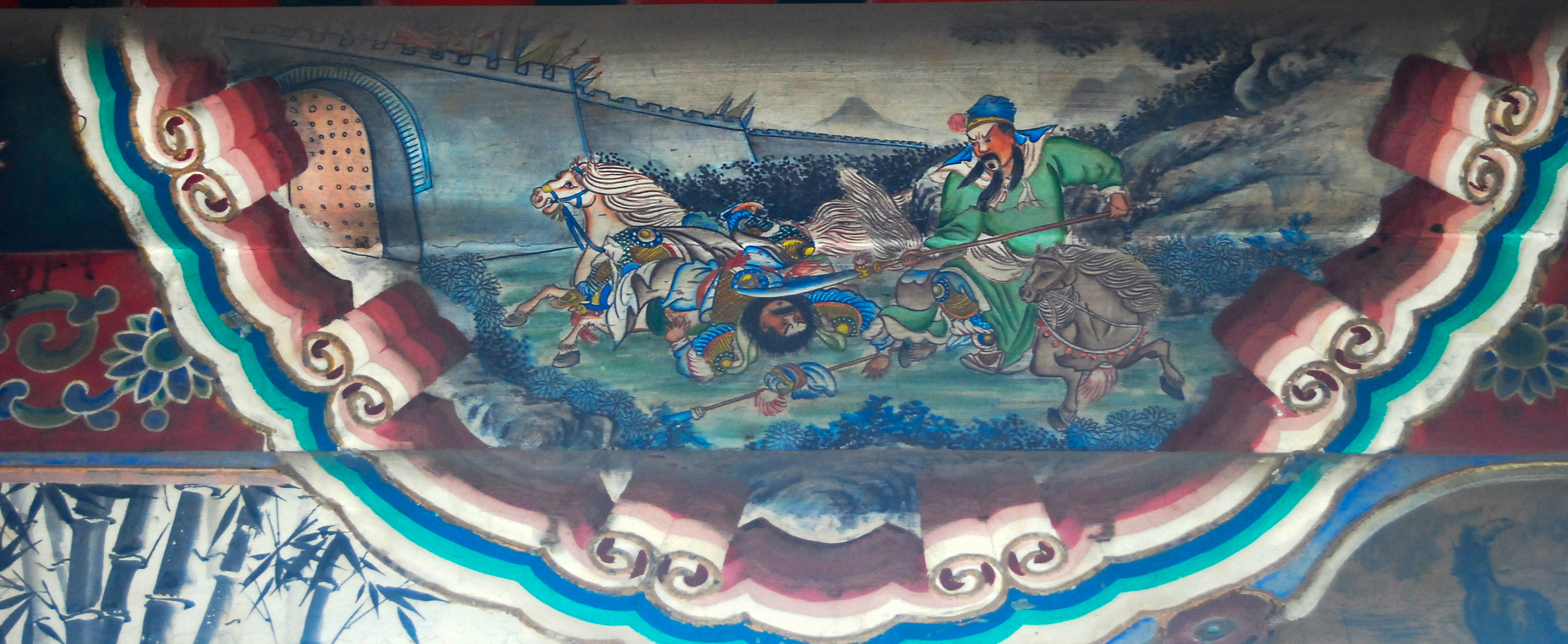
Guan Yu slays Cai Yang, portrait at the Long Corridor of the Summer Palace, Beijing

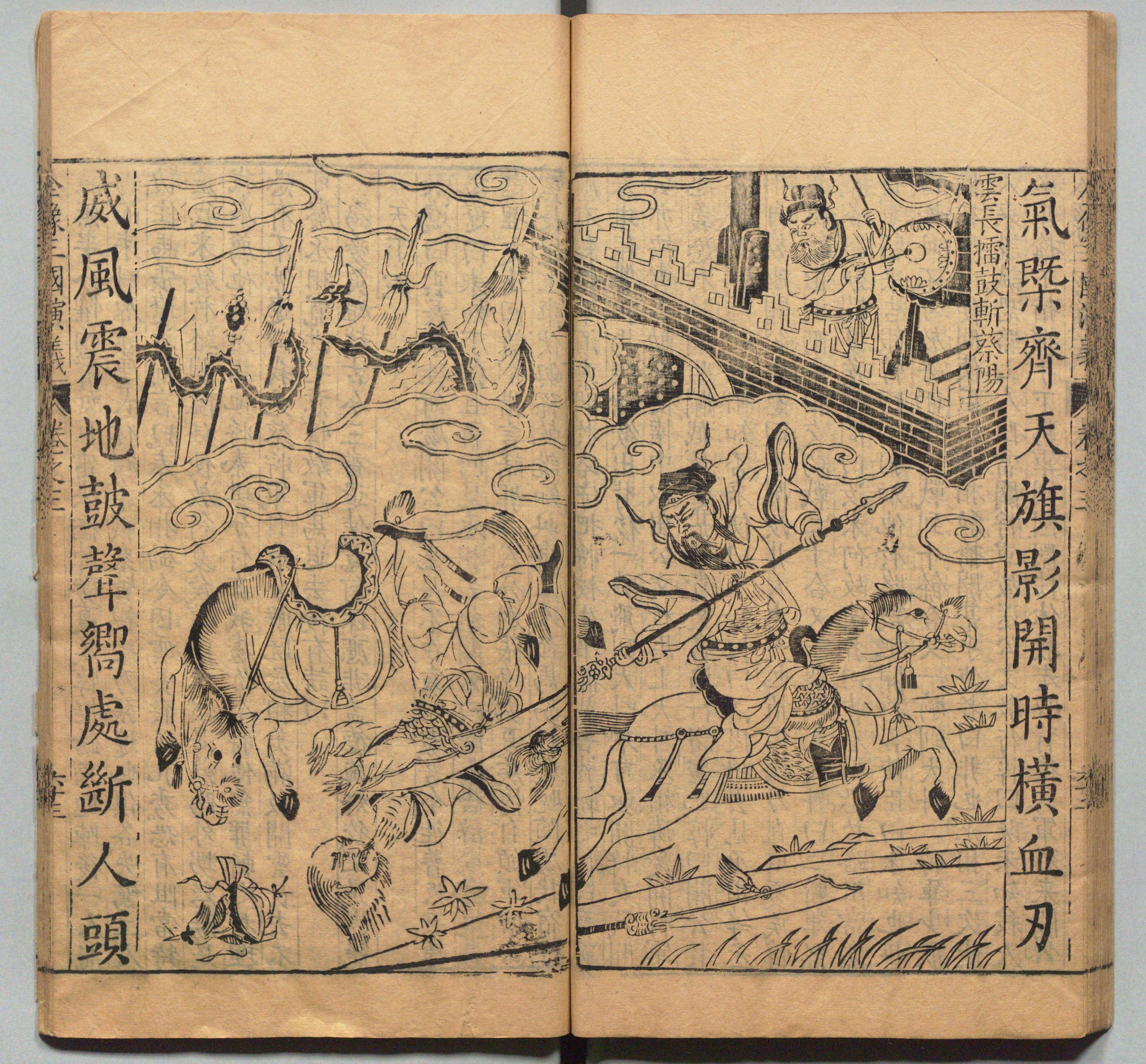
Woodblock print of Guan Yu slaying Cai Yang, while Zhang Fei beats the drum.

Guan Yu meets Zhang Fei at Gucheng (古城) after crossing five passes and slaying six generals. Zhang Fei is initially suspicious of Guan Yu because he mistakenly believes that Guan Yu has betrayed their oath of brotherhood and joined Cao Cao. Despite explanation from Liu Bei's spouses, Zhang Fei refuses to listen and attacks Guan Yu. Both of them are locked in a duel when Cai Yang (蔡陽), an officer under Cao Cao, leads his soldiers to attack them, to avenge the death of his nephew Qin Qi, who was one of the generals that were slain by Guan. Zhang Fei demands Guan Yu to prove his loyalty by killing Cai Yang within three rounds of battle drum rolls, so Guan Yu turns around and kills Cai Yang before Zhang Fei finishes beating the drum. He regains Zhang Fei's trust in him and embraces his sworn brother.

Historicity

Liu Bei's biography in Records mentions that Yuan Shao sent Liu Bei to Runan, where Liu Bei allied himself with Gong Du (共都/龔都), a local bandit chief. Cao Cao sent Cai Yang to attack Liu Bei and Gong Du. Liu Bei defeated and slew Cai Yang in battle.

== Liu Bei's horse leaps across the Tan Stream ==
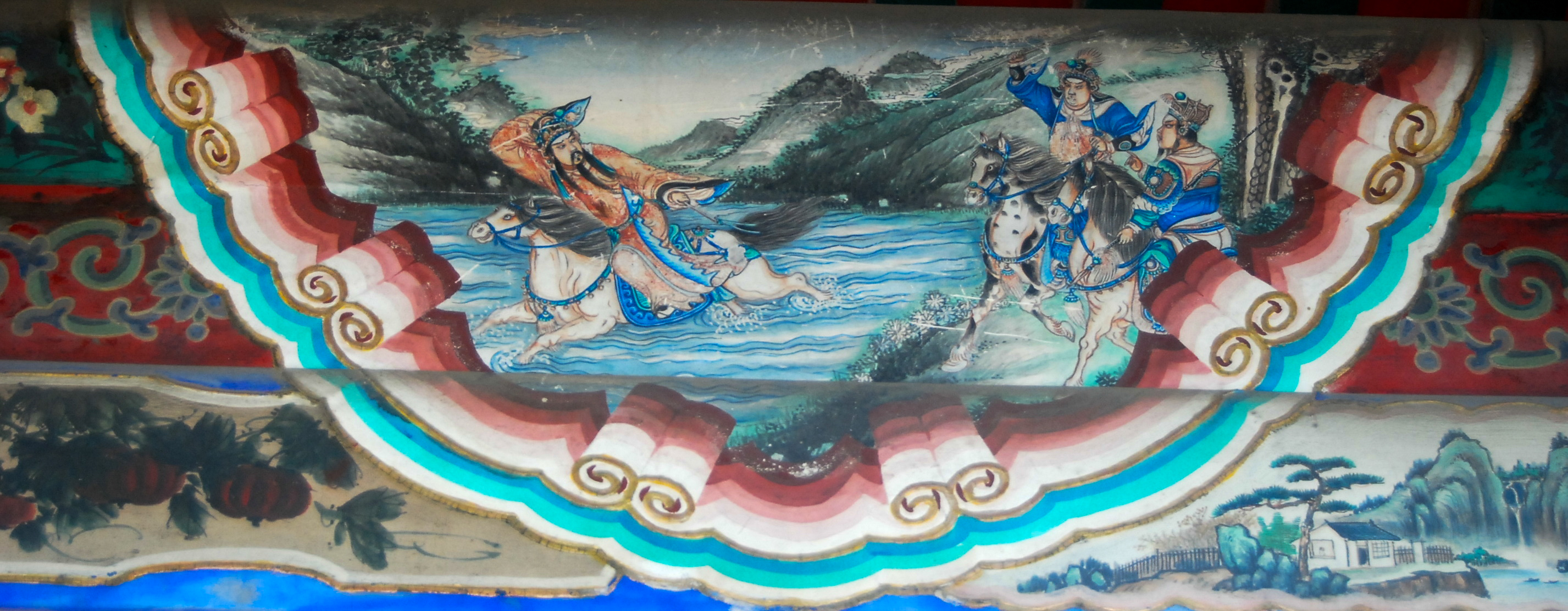
Liu Bei's horse leaps across the Tan Stream (馬躍檀溪), portrait at the Long Corridor of the Summer Palace, Beijing

When Liu Bei is in Xinye, he receives an invitation from Liu Biao, the governor of Jing Province (covering present-day Hubei and Hunan), to attend a feast. However, Liu Biao is sick so he asks his sons Liu Qi and Liu Cong to entertain Liu Bei. Liu Bei arrives in Xiangyang with Zhao Yun and is directed to the feast. Cai Mao and others attempt to assassinate Liu Bei but Yi Ji secretly informs Liu Bei about Cai Mao's plot. Liu Bei pretends to go to the latrine and seizes the opportunity to escape from Xiangyang. When Cai Mao discovers that Liu Bei has fled, he leads a group of soldiers in pursuit. Liu Bei is riding Dilu (的盧), a horse said to bring ill luck to its rider. He reaches the Tan Stream (檀溪), located west of Xiangyang, and attempts to ride across the stream. After taking a few steps, Dilu falls forward and Liu Bei's clothing becomes wet. Liu Bei whips the horse and exclaims, "Dilu! Dilu! Today you obstruct me!" Dilu suddenly rises above the surface and leaps three zhang (or 30 chi) across the stream to the opposite bank, bringing Liu Bei to safety.

Historicity

Guo Song's Shiyu (世語) gives a similar account of this incident. The Jin dynasty historian Sun Sheng argued that the Shiyu account was untrue because relations between Liu Bei and Liu Biao would most likely sour if Liu Bei did encounter such an attempt on his life. However, there was nothing recorded in history about a dispute between Liu Bei and Liu Biao during that period of time.

== Three visits to the thatched cottage ==
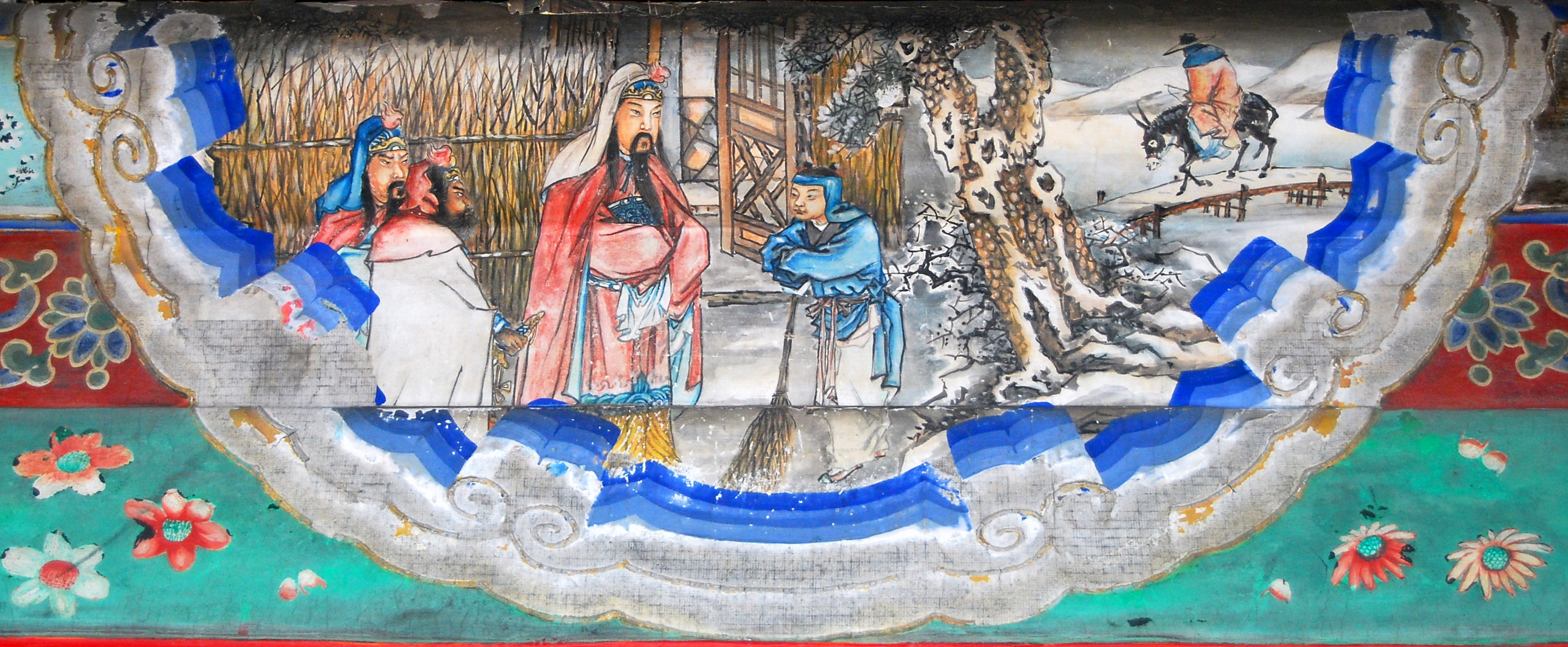
"Three visits to the thatched cottage" (三顧茅廬), the second visit is depicted here. Portrait at the Long Corridor of the Summer Palace, Beijing

Before leaving for Xuchang, Xu Shu recommends Zhuge Liang to Liu Bei and tells him that he needs to recruit Zhuge Liang personally. Accompanied by Guan Yu and Zhang Fei, Liu Bei travels to Longzhong (in present-day Xiangyang, Hubei) to find Zhuge Liang. They arrive at Zhuge Liang's house (described to be a "thatched cottage"), where a servant tells them that his master is not at home. Liu Bei then asks the servant to pass a message to Zhuge Liang that Liu Bei came to visit him. Several days later, in winter, Liu Bei brings his sworn brothers along with him to visit Zhuge Liang again. This time, the servant leads Liu Bei to his "master", who turns out to be Zhuge Liang's younger brother, Zhuge Jun. Just as he is about to leave, Liu Bei sees a man approaching and thinks he must be Zhuge Liang, but he turns out to be Zhuge Liang's father-in-law, Huang Chengyan. When winter is over and spring comes, Liu Bei decides to visit Zhuge Liang again, much to the annoyance of his sworn brothers. This time, Zhuge Liang is at home but is asleep. Liu Bei waits patiently until Zhuge Liang wakes up. Zhuge Liang drafts the Longzhong Plan for Liu Bei and agrees to leave home and serve Liu Bei as his strategist.

Historicity

Zhuge Liang's biography in Records briefly mentions that after Xu Shu recommended Zhuge Liang to Liu Bei, Liu Bei visited Zhuge Liang thrice and met him. Zhuge Liang presented the Longzhong Plan to Liu Bei during their meeting(s). There are no historical records detailing what transpired during each visit.

== Zhuge Liang's mission to Jiangdong ==
Before the Battle of Red Cliffs, Zhuge Liang goes to Jiangdong on a mission to discuss the formation of an alliance between Liu Bei and Sun Quan (i.e. a Sun–Liu alliance) to counter Cao Cao. Lu Su introduces Zhuge Liang to the civil officials and scholars serving under Sun Quan. Most of them are in favour of surrendering to Cao Cao. They start debating. Zhuge Liang manages to silence those who challenge him through his eloquent responses to their queries and comments. Insults and taunts are exchanged as well. The officials and scholars who debate with Zhuge Liang include Zhang Zhao, Yu Fan, Bu Zhi, Xue Zong, Lu Ji, Yan Jun and Cheng Bing. Zhang Wen and Luo Tong also want to challenge Zhuge Liang, but Huang Gai shows up and stops the debate.

Lu Su then introduces Zhuge Liang to Zhou Yu. Zhuge Liang, Zhou Yu and Lu Su then have a conversation in Zhou Yu's house. Zhuge Liang says he has a plan to make Cao Cao to retreat without fighting a war: send Cao Cao the Two Qiaos. He also pretends that he does not know whom the Qiao sisters married, when in fact the younger sister Xiao Qiao is married to Zhou Yu, while the elder sister Da Qiao is the widow of Sun Che, the former leader of Jiangdong who is the elder brother of Sun Quan as well as the sworn brother of Zhou Yu. When Zhou Yu asks Zhuge Liang for evidence that Cao Cao wants the Two Qiaos, Zhuge Liang says he heard that Cao Cao asked his son Cao Zhi to write a poem, "Ode to the Bronze Sparrow Platform" (銅雀臺賦). Zhuge Liang recites the poem and points out that Cao Cao's desire to have the Qiaos is evident in the poem. An enraged Zhou Yu hardens his decision to go to war with Cao Cao.

Historicity

The debate between Zhuge Liang and the scholars is not mentioned in any of the involved parties' biographies in Records. The biographies of Zhuge Liang, Sun Quan, Zhou Yu and Lu Su all confirm that Zhuge Liang met Sun Quan on that mission, but it remains unknown whether Zhuge Liang met any other person on the same trip. Zhuge Liang's biography, in particular, contains a detailed record of a conversation between Zhuge Liang and Sun Quan.

The Bronze Sparrow Platform was built in the winter of 210, nearly three years after the Battle of Red Cliffs. Cao Zhi's poem "Ode to the Bronze Sparrow Platform" was written in 212, two years after the platform was constructed. Besides, the poem in Romance contains seven additional lines which are not present in the historical version recorded in Cao Zhi's biography in Records. Therefore, the story in Romance about Zhuge Liang using the poem to instigate Zhou Yu to go to war with Cao Cao is entirely fictitious.

== Borrowing arrows with straw boats ==
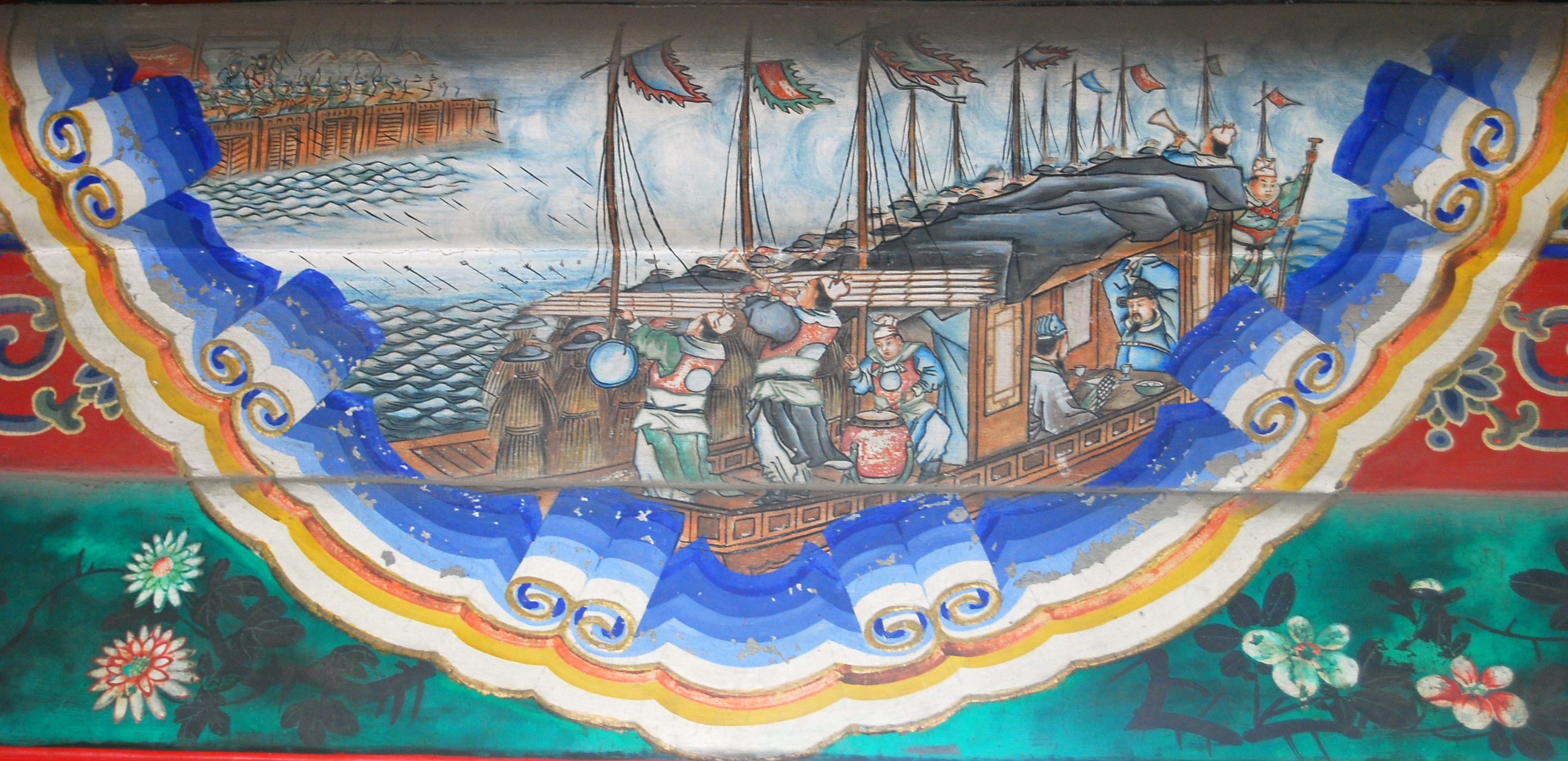
Borrowing arrows with straw boats (草船借箭), portrait at the Long Corridor of the Summer Palace, Beijing

Zhou Yu feels jealous of Zhuge Liang's talent and foresees that he will become a threat to Sun Quan in the future, so he tries to think of ways to kill Zhuge Liang. When he asks Zhuge Liang to help him produce 100,000 arrows within 10 days, the latter says he can complete the task in three days. Zhou Yu then asks Zhuge Liang if he is willing to make a pledge to complete the task. Under the pledge, if Zhuge Liang fails to produce 100,000 arrows in three days, he will be executed for his failure. When Zhuge Liang agrees and takes the pledge, Zhou Yu secretly feels delighted because he thinks that Zhuge Liang cannot complete the task in time.

On the third day, with help from Lu Su, Zhuge Liang prepares 20 large boats, each manned by a few soldiers and filled with human-like figures made of straw and hay. In the hours before dawn, when there is a great fog, Zhuge Liang deploys the boats and sails towards Cao Cao's camp across the river. He orders the sailors to beat war drums loudly and shout orders to imitate the sounds of an attack. Upon hearing the noises, Cao Cao's troops rush out to engage the enemy but they are unsure of the enemy force's size because their vision is obscured by the fog. They fire volleys of arrows in the direction of the noises and the arrows become stuck in the straw figures. In the meantime, Zhuge Liang enjoys drinks with Lu Su inside the cabin and they sail back when the fog clears. By the time they return to base, Zhuge Liang has acquired more than 100,000 arrows, so Zhou Yu cannot execute him.

Historicity

This event is not documented in Records and is purely fiction. However, Yu Huan's Weilüe mentions a similar incident during the Battle of Ruxu in 213. Sun Quan sailed on a large vessel to observe Cao Cao's base. Cao Cao ordered his archers to fire arrows at Sun Quan's ship. The arrows were stuck to one side of the vessel and the ship was on the verge of overturning due to the weight of the arrows. Sun Quan ordered the vessel to turn around so the other side would have arrows stuck to it. Balance was restored and Sun Quan sailed back to his camp.

== Zhuge Liang summons an eastern wind ==
Before the Battle of Red Cliffs, after all preparations have been made for a fire attack on Cao Cao's fleet, Zhou Yu suddenly realises that in order for the attack to be successful, the wind must be blowing from the southeast towards Cao Cao's position or else it would be his own fleet that catches fire. When he sees the wind blowing from the northwest, he coughs blood, faints and falls sick. Zhuge Liang visits him and points out the root cause of his sudden illness – his worries about the direction of the wind. He claims that he can change the direction of the winds in their favour through a ritual. Zhou Yu then orders his men to set up an altar according to Zhuge Liang's instructions; Zhuge Liang performs a ritual on the altar for three days and three nights. On the third night, the wind changes direction and starts blowing from the southeast. Zhuge Liang leaves immediately as he knows that Zhou Yu will send his men to kill him. As Zhuge Liang foresaw, Zhou Yu sends Ding Feng and Xu Sheng to execute him, but he has already fled on a boat captained by Zhao Yun.

== Guan Yu releases Cao Cao at Huarong Trail ==
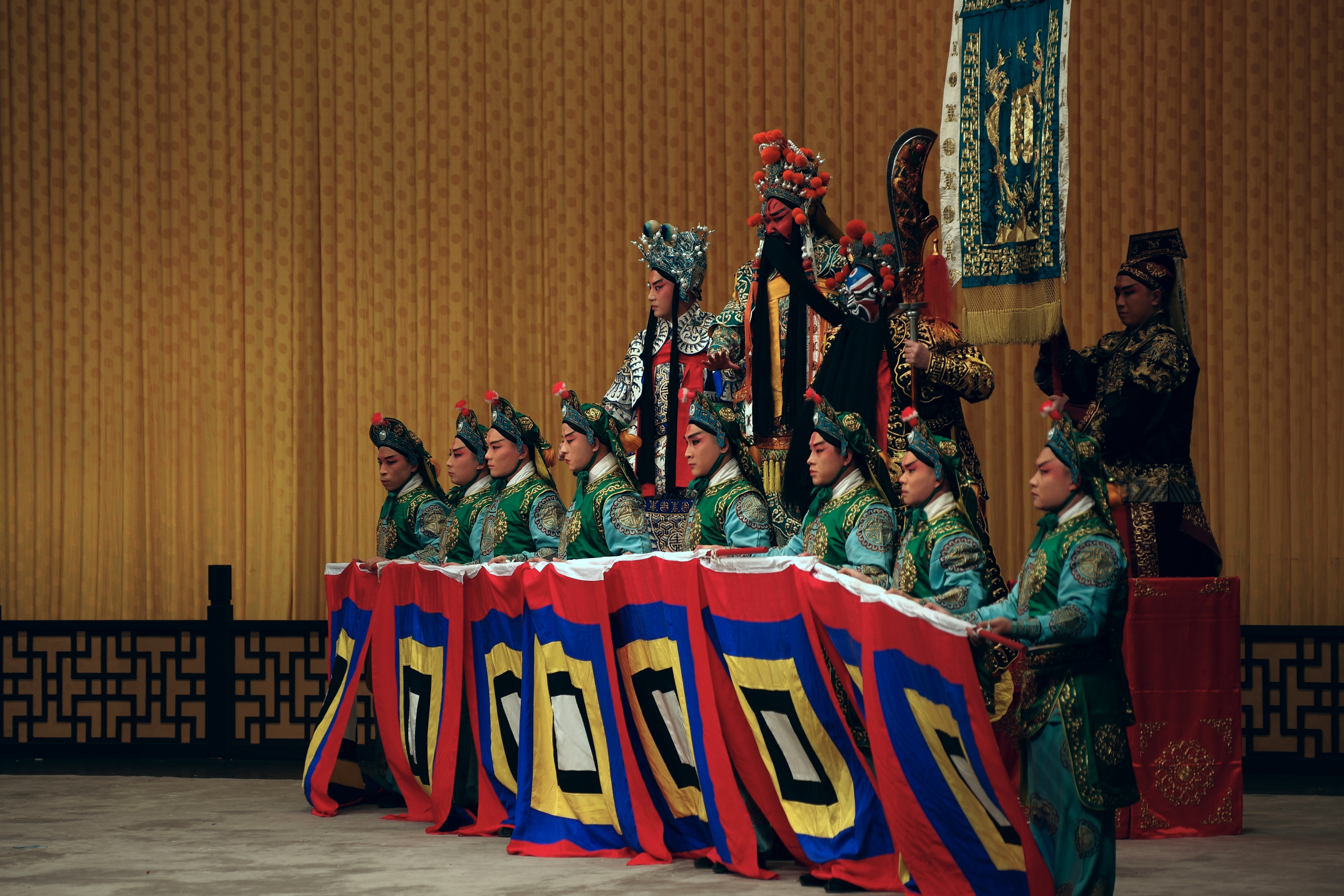
Guan Yu, flanked by Guan Ping and the Guandao-carrying Zhou Cang, waiting at Huarong Trail. From a Peking opera performance by Shanghai Jingju Theatre Company on January 17, 2015, in Tianchan Theatre, Shanghai, China.

Guan Yu is sent to guard Huarong Trail (believed to be near present-day Dongshan Town, Huarong County, Hunan) and intercept Cao Cao when he passes by after his defeat at the Battle of Red Cliffs. Zhuge Liang is initially reluctant to allow Guan Yu to take up the task because he is worried that Guan might consider the kindness Cao Cao showed towards him many years ago and end up releasing Cao Cao. Guan Yu insists on accepting the mission and claims he has already repaid Cao Cao's kindness by slaying Yan Liang and Wen Chou and lifting the siege on Boma. He makes a pledge to not let Cao Cao off; Zhuge Liang also makes a pledge that he will give his head to Guan Yu if Cao Cao does not show up at Huarong Trail. As Zhuge Liang predicted, Cao Cao reaches Huarong Trail and encounters Guan Yu there. However, Guan Yu decides to spare Cao Cao in consideration of their past dealings, and after taking pity on the plight of Cao Cao's men and Zhang Liao, whom he saved from death at the Battle of Xiapi. He allows Cao Cao and his men to pass through Huarong Trail unharmed. When he returns to camp, he confesses the truth to Liu Bei and Zhuge Liang. Zhuge Liang orders Guan Yu to be executed for failing in his mission but pardons him when Liu Bei intervenes.

Historicity

This incident is not mentioned in Records and is entirely fiction. The Shanyang Gong Zaiji (山陽公載記) states that after Cao Cao lost the Battle of Red Cliffs, he retreated with his surviving men and passed by Huarong Trail. The path was muddy and difficult to access, so Cao Cao ordered the weaker soldiers to lay the ground with straw and hay so that his horsemen can pass. Many of those weaker soldiers were trampled to death when they became stuck in the mud. When Cao Cao finally got out of the dire situation, he expressed joy so his generals asked him why he was happy. Cao Cao replied, "Liu Bei, he's my mate. However, he doesn't think fast; if he had set fire earlier I'd have no chance of escaping." Liu Bei did think of setting fire but it was too late as Cao Cao had already escaped.

== Battle of Changsha ==
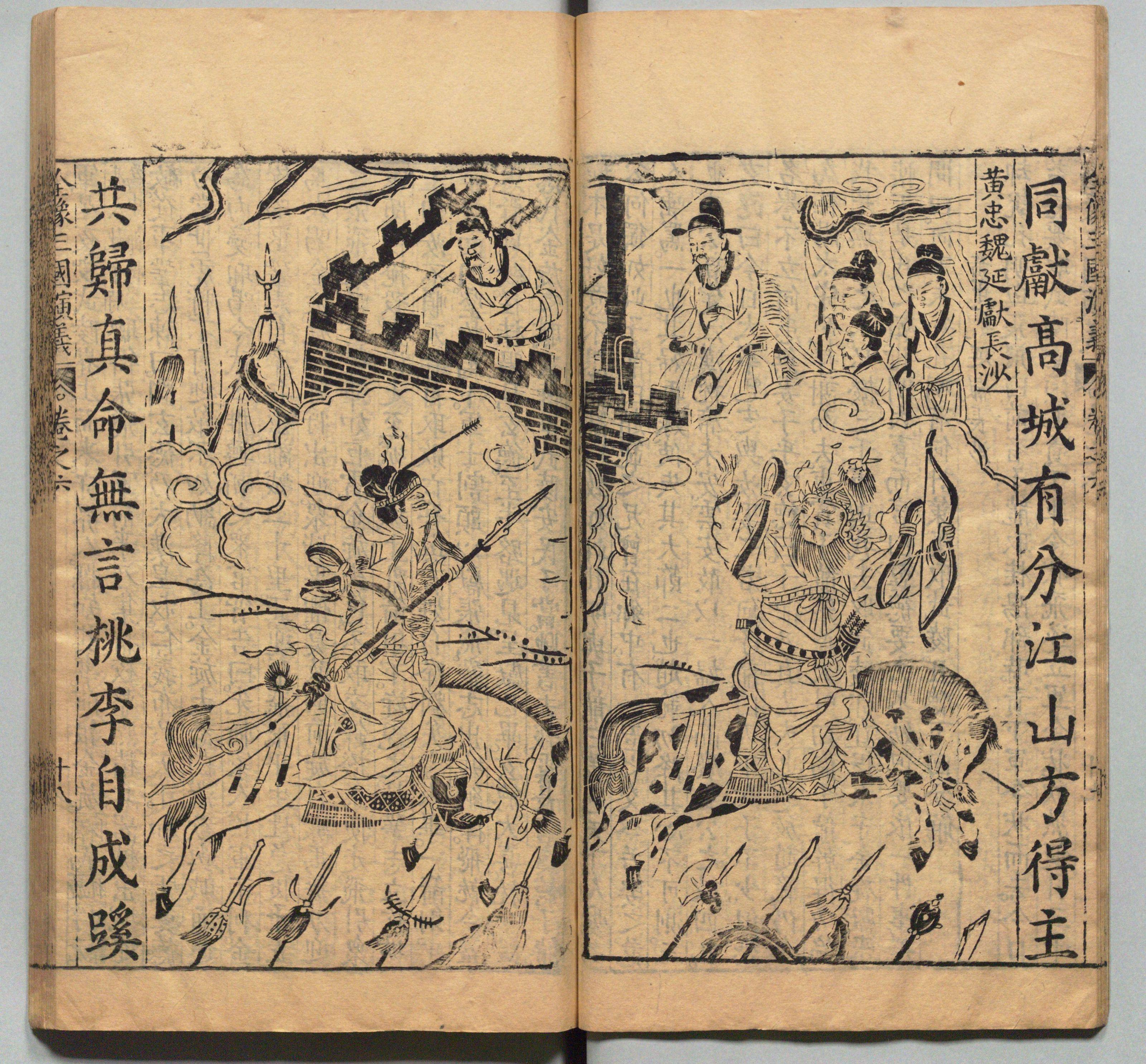
Woodblock print of Guan Yu battling with Huang Zhong.

The Battle of Changsha is a fictional military skirmish described in Chapter 53 of the 14th-century historical novel Romance of the Three Kingdoms that took place in Changsha, in Jing Province, between the warlords Liu Bei and Han Xuan. The battle introduces two major Shu Han generals, Huang Zhong and Wei Yan.

Han Xuan, a former subordinate of Liu Biao, controlled the city of Changsha following Liu Biao's death in 208 and Liu Cong's failed succession. Han Xuan and another warlord Jin Xuan seceded from Jing Province following Cao Cao's stalemated conquest of Jing Province

Cao Cao, Liu Bei, and Sun Quan all desired Jing Province, and Sun Quan had little of the province except for the southern side of the Yangtze near Xiakou and Chibi. Finding an opportunity to take Jing Province and a few other important locations, Liu Bei dispatched Guan Yu to take Changsha and eliminate Han Xuan.

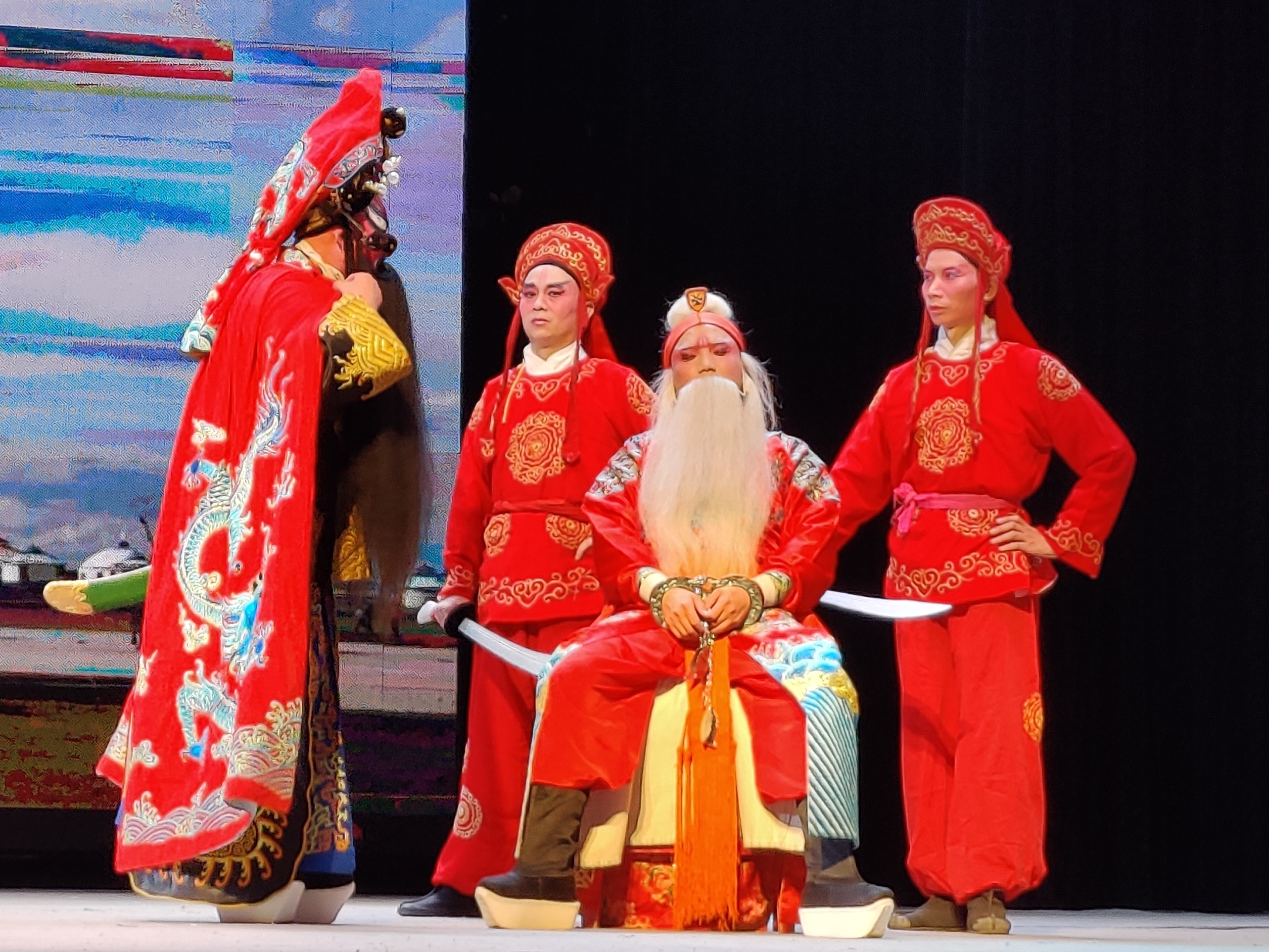
Wei Yan (left) approaches Huang Zhong, who awaits execution. From a 2019 Shao opera performance in Shaoxing.

When Guan Yu led his forces towards Changsha, Han Xuan sent his general Yang Ling to meet the enemy, but Yang Ling was killed. Han Xuan then sent Huang Zhong, who fought with Guan Yu. Whilst fighting, both generals developed respect for each other, and did not take opportunities to slay the other.

Han Xuan saw this, and ordered Huang Zhong to be put to death. Wei Yan rescued Huang Zhong by cutting down the executioner, then led a revolt to kill Han Xuan. Wei Yan then surrendered the city to Guan Yu.

Huang Zhong, Wei Yan and Liu Pan would all become prominent people of Shu Han following their surrenders to Liu Bei. Huang Zhong would become a "Tiger general" along with Guan Yu, Zhang Fei, Zhao Yun, and Ma Chao. He would fight in the Hanzhong Campaign and kill Xiahou Yuan during a clash with Cao Cao's forces at Battle of Mt. Dingjun. Liu Pan would become the magistrate of Changsha for the Shu kingdom.

When Wei Yan surrendered, Zhuge Liang ordered him to be executed, but Liu Bei intervened. Zhuge Liang would always suspect Wei Yan, fearing he would again revolt. Indeed, later in Chapter 104, after Zhuge Liang's death in the Battle of Wuzhang Plains, Wei Yan does revolt.

Historicity

Historically, Han Xuan surrendered to Liu Bei as part of the Battle of Jiangling in 208 without conflict, and Wei Yan was one of Liu Bei's personal retainers and rose through the ranks to become a general; he had nothing to do with Han Xuan and Huang Zhong. Besides, Wei Yan was one of Zhuge Liang's most trusted warriors and generals during his northern expeditions, with Wei Yan participating all five expeditions as Zhuge Liang's military advisor.

== Liu Bei and Lady Sun's marriage ==
Zhou Yu suggests the "beauty scheme" (美人計) to Sun Quan to seize control of Jing Province (covering present-day Hubei and Hunan) from Liu Bei. In the plan, Sun Quan sends Lü Fan to lure Liu Bei to his territory under the pretext of marrying Sun Quan's sister, Lady Sun, to strengthen the Sun–Liu alliance. Once Liu Bei arrives, Sun Quan will then hold him hostage in exchange for Jing Province. However, Zhuge Liang foils Zhou Yu's plan, and Liu Bei ends up marrying Lady Sun for real. Liu Bei also manages to leave Sun Quan's territory with his bride and return to Jing Province safely. When Zhou Yu leads his troops in pursuit of Liu Bei, he falls into an ambush by Liu Bei's forces. Liu Bei's men chant: "(Zhou Yu)'s brilliant strategy brings peace to the world. He lost both the Lady and his soldiers." (周郎妙計安天下，賠了夫人又折兵！) Zhou Yu coughs blood and faints.

Historicity

The marriage between Liu Bei and Lady Sun is mentioned in Liu Bei's biography in Records as follows: After Liu Qi died of illness, Liu Bei's subordinates urged him to become the new governor of Jing Province and set up the provincial capital at Gong'an County. Sun Quan felt slightly uneasy so he married his younger sister to Liu Bei to strengthen relations between him and Liu Bei. This suggests that the marriage took place in Gong'an County, as Sun Quan sent his sister there to marry Liu Bei, instead of Liu Bei travelling to Sun Quan's territory for the marriage.

However, Zhou Yu's biography mentions that Zhou Yu suggested to Sun Quan to have Liu Bei confined in their territory. After Liu Bei assumed governorship of Jing Province, he went to Jing (京; present-day Zhenjiang, Jiangsu) to meet Sun Quan. At the time, Zhou Yu told Sun Quan, "Liu Bei possesses characteristics of a fierce and ambitious hero. Besides, he also has under him generals with the might of bears and tigers, such as Guan Yu and Zhang Fei. He's definitely not someone who will remain subservient to another lord. I suggest moving Liu Bei to Wu (吳; in present-day Suzhou, Jiangsu), build a palace for him there, and present him with women and gifts to entertain him. We'll then put the two men (Guan Yu and Zhang Fei) each in a different location. If I can use Liu Bei as a hostage and attack (his men) at the same time, our goal (take over Jing Province) will be accomplished. And now yet we carve out land for them as resources, and allow the three men to be together? I'm afraid once the dragon encounters clouds and rain, it'll no longer remain in a pond." Sun Quan considered that Cao Cao was still a threat in the north, so he thought it would be better for him to have more allies (instead of creating hostility between him and his allies). He was also worried that Liu Bei's men might not submit to him, so he rejected Zhou Yu's idea. This shows that Zhou Yu wanted to confine Liu Bei in Wu and use him as a hostage to control his men (Guan Yu, Zhang Fei and others), but nothing is mentioned about him using Lady Sun as a bait to lure Liu Bei into a trap. Instead, the women mentioned in the plan were used to entertain Liu Bei during his confinement and distract him from his men.

Fa Zheng's biography hints that Liu Bei's relationship with Lady Sun was not as romantic as described in Romance. Instead, Liu Bei was suspicious of Lady Sun and feared her. Zhuge Liang once said, "When our lord (Liu Bei) was in Gong'an, he was wary of Cao Cao's influence in the north and fearful of Sun Quan's presence in the east. Even in home territory, he was afraid that Lady Sun might stir up trouble." Lady Sun's personality was described as follows in Fa Zheng's biography: Sun Quan married his sister to Liu Bei. She was fierce and tough in character, much like her elder brother. She had about 100 female servants, each of them standing on guard and carrying a sword. Every time Liu Bei entered (her room), he felt a chill in his heart.

== Zhou Yu's death ==
Zhou Yu's death is mentioned in Chapter 57. In the previous chapter, Zhou Yu comes up with a plan to help Sun Quan seize Jing Province from Liu Bei. He pretends to help Liu Bei attack Yi Province (covering present-day Sichuan and Chongqing) and asks for passage through Jing Province. When Liu Bei agrees, Zhou Yu feels overjoyed because his true intention is to conquer Jing Province when his army passes through. However, Zhuge Liang sees through Zhou Yu's ruse and sets a trap. Zhou Yu falls into the trap and is surrounded by Liu Bei's forces. He is overwhelmed by fury and falls off his horse. Zhuge Liang later writes a letter to Zhou Yu, asking him to give up on attacking Yi Province and return to Wu instead because Cao Cao might take advantage of his absence to invade Wu. Zhou Yu then writes to Sun Quan and tells the other Wu generals to give their full support to their lord. He faints afterwards, regains consciousness and sighs, "If (Zhou) Yu were to be born, why must (Zhuge) Liang exist as well?" He dies after repeating that line several times.

This is the third time Zhou Yu is infuriated by Zhuge Liang after sustaining an arrow wound at the Battle of Jiangling. The first time was when Liu Bei, acting on Zhuge Liang's advice, seized control of many territories in Jing Province when Zhou Yu and his men were busy fighting with Cao Cao's forces for control of the province. The second time was when Zhuge Liang foiled his "beauty scheme" (see #Liu Bei and Lady Sun's marriage.) Zhou Yu's condition worsens after each incident and he eventually dies after the third incident.

Historicity

Zhou Yu's biography in Records mentions that Zhou was preparing for a campaign to conquer Yi Province (covering present-day Sichuan and Chongqing) and Hanzhong when he died of illness at Baqiu (巴丘; present-day Yueyang, Hunan). Nothing is mentioned about Zhuge Liang causing Zhou Yu's death.

== New Book of Mengde ==
In Chapter 60, Liu Zhang sends Zhang Song as an envoy to meet Cao Cao in Xuchang. Zhang Song ridicules Cao Cao in front of his registrar, Yang Xiu. Yang Xiu shows Zhang Song the New Book of Mengde (孟德新書), a military book written by Cao Cao and based on The Art of War. Zhang Song looks through the book and laughs and says, "Even young children in Shu can recite this book, how can it be a "new book"? This book was written by an anonymous writer during the Warring States period. (Cao Cao) plagiarised the book, and people like you are deceived by him." Zhang Song then recites the book verbatim to Yang Xiu. When Yang Xiu tells Cao Cao about the incident later, Cao Cao tears the book and burns it. The book was later found in a basin of ginger presented to Cao Cao by the sage Zuo Ci.

Historicity

The Wei Shu annotation in Records mentions that Cao Cao wrote military books for his generals. The New Book of Mengde is mentioned and quoted in Questions and Replies between Tang Taizong and Li Weigong, a dialogue between Emperor Taizong of the Tang dynasty and the general Li Jing. Cao Cao's commentary on The Art of War is still extant and is included in many annotated versions of the book.

== Battle of Jiameng Pass ==
In 212, Liu Zhang invited Liu Bei into Yi Province (covering present-day Sichuan and Chongqing) to help him defend against Zhang Lu's forces in Hanzhong. Liu Bei proceeded to Jiameng Pass (in present-day Zhaohua District, Guangyuan, Sichuan) and stationed there. However, Liu Bei and Liu Zhang eventually turned hostile towards each other when Liu Zhang discovered that his follower Zhang Song had been plotting with Liu Bei to seize Yi Province from him.

Liu Zhang formed an alliance with Zhang Lu against Liu Bei. Zhang Lu sent Ma Chao to lead an army to attack Liu Bei at Jiameng Pass. There, Ma Chao encountered Zhang Fei and duelled with him. After engaging each other in two long separate fights, neither Zhang Fei nor Ma Chao was able to gain an advantage over his opponent, and they retreated back to their respective camps. Liu Bei did not want either his sworn brother or Ma Chao to get hurt, so he consulted Zhuge Liang. Zhuge Liang suggested that Ma Chao would be of great help to them if he was willing to serve Liu Bei. Hence, Liu Bei sent Li Hui to persuade Ma Chao to switch allegiance to him. Concurrently, Liu Bei also sent people to spread negative rumours about Ma Chao in Hanzhong, causing Zhang Lu to become suspicious of Ma Chao. Ma Chao heard that Zhang Lu was starting to doubt his loyalty and planned to defect to Liu Bei, especially since Liu Bei was a rival of his sworn enemy, Cao Cao.

At that time, Liu Bei was besieging Liu Zhang in Yi Province's capital Chengdu, when he received Ma Chao's request to serve him. Liu Bei was pleased and eagerly accepted Ma Chao's assistance, and sent troops and supplies to Ma Chao's camp. Following that, Ma Chao led his army to attack Chengdu from the north. Liu Zhang was shocked because he did not expect Ma Chao to make such a move. Shortly later, Liu Bei's adviser Jian Yong managed to convince Liu Zhang to surrender, and Yi Province came under Liu Bei's control. Ma Chao became one of the Five Tiger Generals under Liu Bei after the latter defeated Cao Cao in the Hanzhong Campaign and declared himself "King of Hanzhong".

Historicity

The Battle of Jiameng Pass was not documented in Records. There is no mention of a duel between Ma Chao and Zhang Fei. Ma Chao's defection from Zhang Lu to Liu Bei's side is described in Ma Chao's biography as follows:

"Ma Chao could not get along well with Zhang Lu and they were suspicious of each other. When Ma Chao heard that Liu Bei was besieging Liu Zhang in Chengdu (Yi Province's capital), he secretly wrote a letter to Liu Bei, expressing his willingness to surrender. Liu Bei sent his men to receive Ma Chao, and Ma led his troops to outside Chengdu. This caused panic in the city and Liu Zhang surrendered. Liu Bei appointed Ma Chao as General Who Pacifies the West and placed him in charge of Linju (臨沮)."

An annotation from Yu Huan's Dianlue in Ma Chao's biography stated:

"When Liu Bei heard that Ma Chao had arrived he was pleased and said 'Yi Province is mine.' He then sent his men to meet Ma Chao and sent reinforcements and supplies to the latter. When Ma Chao reached Chengdu, he stationed his army north of the city and Chengdu fell (to Liu Bei) within 10 days of Ma Chao's arrival."

Nothing is mentioned about the roles Zhuge Liang, Yang Song and Li Hui played in Ma Chao's defection.

== Hua Tuo heals Guan Yu's arm ==
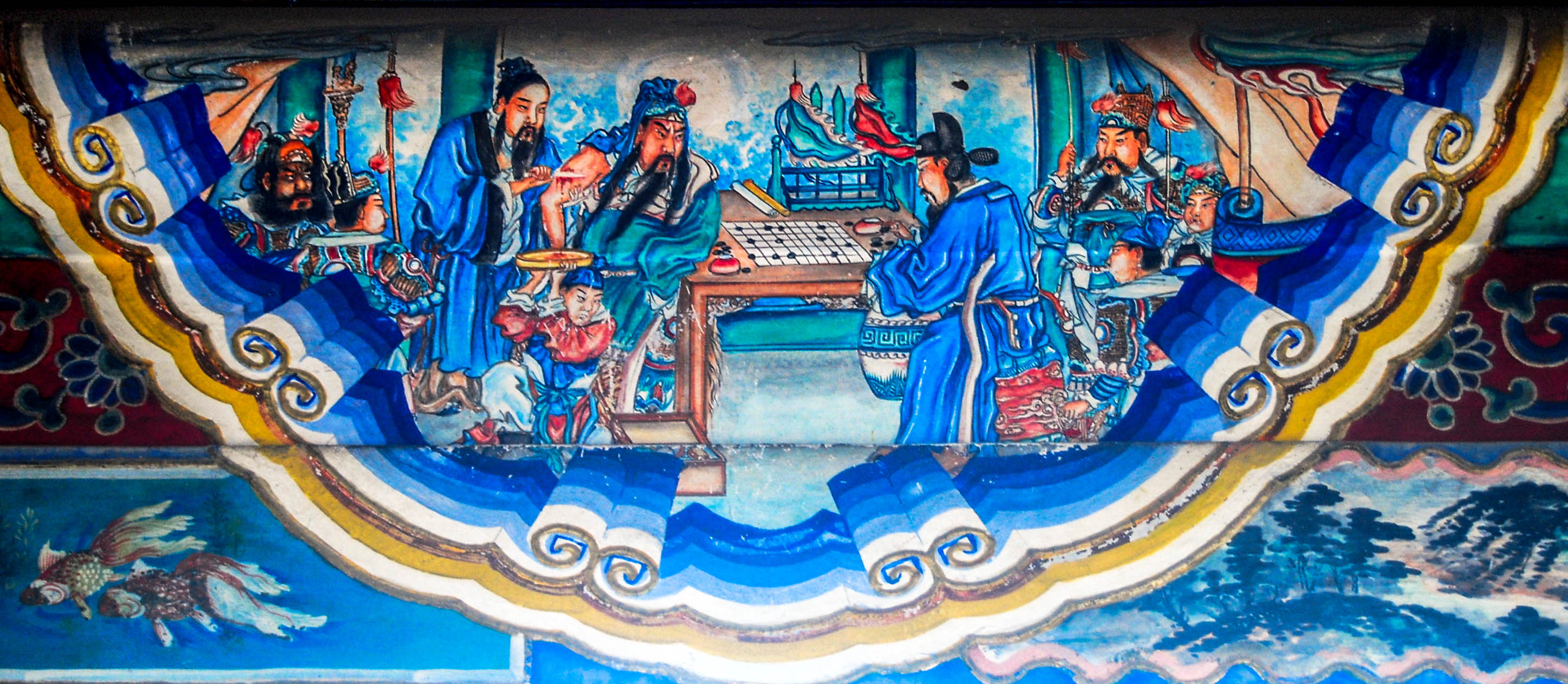
Huo Tuo treats Guan Yu's poisoned arm by scraping the bone (刮骨療毒), portrait at the Long Corridor of the Summer Palace, Beijing

During the Battle of Fancheng, Guan Yu is injured in the arm by a crossbow bolt coated with poison. The physician Hua Tuo comes to his camp and offers to heal his arm. After diagnosis, Hua Tuo says the poison has already seeped through the flesh into the bone and he needs to perform surgery on Guan Yu's arm. He also tells Guan Yu that he must be blindfolded and his arm must be secured before the surgery can be carried out, but Guan Yu says it is too troublesome and asks him to perform the surgery on the spot. Hua Tuo cuts open the flesh on Guan Yu's arm, exposing the bone, then scrapes off the venom on the bone and stitches up the wound. Guan Yu shows no sign of pain and continues playing weiqi with Ma Liang during the surgery. He thanks Hua Tuo for healing his arm and wants to reward him but the physician declines.

Historicity

Hua Tuo's biography in Records does not specify his year of death, but it is certain that he died before 208. (See #Cao Cao's death for more information.) The Battle of Fancheng took place in 219, some 11 years after 208, so it was not possible for Hua Tuo to be around to heal Guan Yu's arm. However, Guan Yu's biography mentions a similar incident, but without Hua Tuo's involvement. See Guan Yu#Arm injury for details.

== Events after Guan Yu's death ==
In Chapter 77, after Guan Yu died, his spirit roams the land and cries out, "Return my head!" His spirit comes to Yuquan Hill outside Dangyang and encounters Pujing, the monk who saved his life many years ago at Sishui Pass. Pujing tells Guan Yu's spirit, "Now you ask for your head, but from whom should Yan Liang, Wen Chou, the pass guardians and many others ask for theirs?" Guan Yu's spirit is enlightened and disappears, but henceforth it manifested itself around the hill and protected the locals from evil. The locals built a temple on the hill to worship the spirit. Pujing is said to have built a grass hut for himself at the southeastern foot of Yuquan Hill in the final years of the Eastern Han dynasty. The Yuquan Temple, the oldest temple in the Dangyang region from where the worship of Guan Yu originated, was built on the exact location of the hut, and its construction was completed only until the Sui dynasty.

Sun Quan sends Guan Yu's head to Cao Cao in the hope of pushing the responsibility of Guan Yu's death to Cao Cao. When Cao Cao opens the box containing Guan Yu's head, he sees that Guan Yu's facial expressions resemble those of a living person. He smiles and says to the head, "I hope you are well since we last parted." To his horror, Guan Yu's head opens its eyes and mouth and the long beard and hairs stand on ends. Cao Cao collapses and does not regain consciousness until a long time later. When he comes to, he exclaims, "General Guan is truly a god from heaven!" Then he orders the head to be buried with honours befitting a noble.

== Cao Cao's death ==
When Cao Cao starts complaining about splitting headaches in his final days, his subjects recommend Hua Tuo, a physician with remarkable skills, to heal him. Hua Tuo diagnoses Cao Cao's illness to be a form of rheumatism in the skull. He suggests giving Cao Cao a dose of hashish and then splitting open his skull with a sharp axe to extract the pus within. Due to an earlier incident with another physician Ji Ping, who attempted to poison him, Cao Cao is suspicious of any physician. He believes that Hua Tuo intends to kill him to avenge Guan Yu so he orders the physician to be imprisoned. Hua Tuo dies a few days later in prison and Cao Cao dies from his illness not long after.

Historicity

Cao Cao's biography in Records mentions that he died in Luoyang in 220 at the age of 66 (by East Asian age reckoning). Hua Tuo's biography mentions that Cao Cao had Hua Tuo executed when Hua Tuo refused to treat his chronic headaches. Cao Cao regretted killing Hua Tuo because his son Cao Chong died from illness, and he believed that Hua Tuo could have cured Cao Chong. Hua Tuo's biography does not specify his year of death, but it is certain that he died before 208, the year in which Cao Chong died. Therefore, the story in Romance is entirely fictional.

The Shiyu (世語) and Cao Man Zhuan (曹瞞傳) annotations to Records provide more dramatic accounts of the events before Cao Cao's death. The Shiyu account states that Cao Cao wanted to build a palace in Luoyang so he ordered a Zhuolong Shrine (濯龍祠) to be demolished, but blood spilt out from a tree. The Cao Man Zhuan account mentions that Cao Cao wanted a pear tree to be moved. When the workers uprooted the tree, blood spilt out from its roots, and the workers were all shocked. Cao Cao heard about it and went there to take a closer look. He was disgusted and felt that it was an unlucky omen. He became ill after returning home.

== Meng Huo captured and released seven times ==
The Nanman barbarian king Meng Huo rebels against Shu. Zhuge Liang leads an army to pacify the Nanman tribes. Meng Huo is defeated and captured by Zhuge Liang's forces seven times. During the first six times, Meng Huo complains that he is dissatisfied because he was captured by strategy and did not have a chance to fight a real battle, so Zhuge Liang releases him each time to come back for another battle. On the seventh time, Meng Huo feels ashamed of himself and swears eternal allegiance to Shu.

Historicity

Pei Songzhi's annotations to Zhuge Liang's biography in Records contain a line about "capture and release seven times" but no details are provided. Characters associated with Meng Huo such as E'huan (鄂煥), Lady Zhurong, Meng You and King Mulu are fictional.

== Jiang Wei's Northern Expeditions ==
Japanese Ukiyo-e-style triptych woodblock prints inspired by fictional scenes in the novel
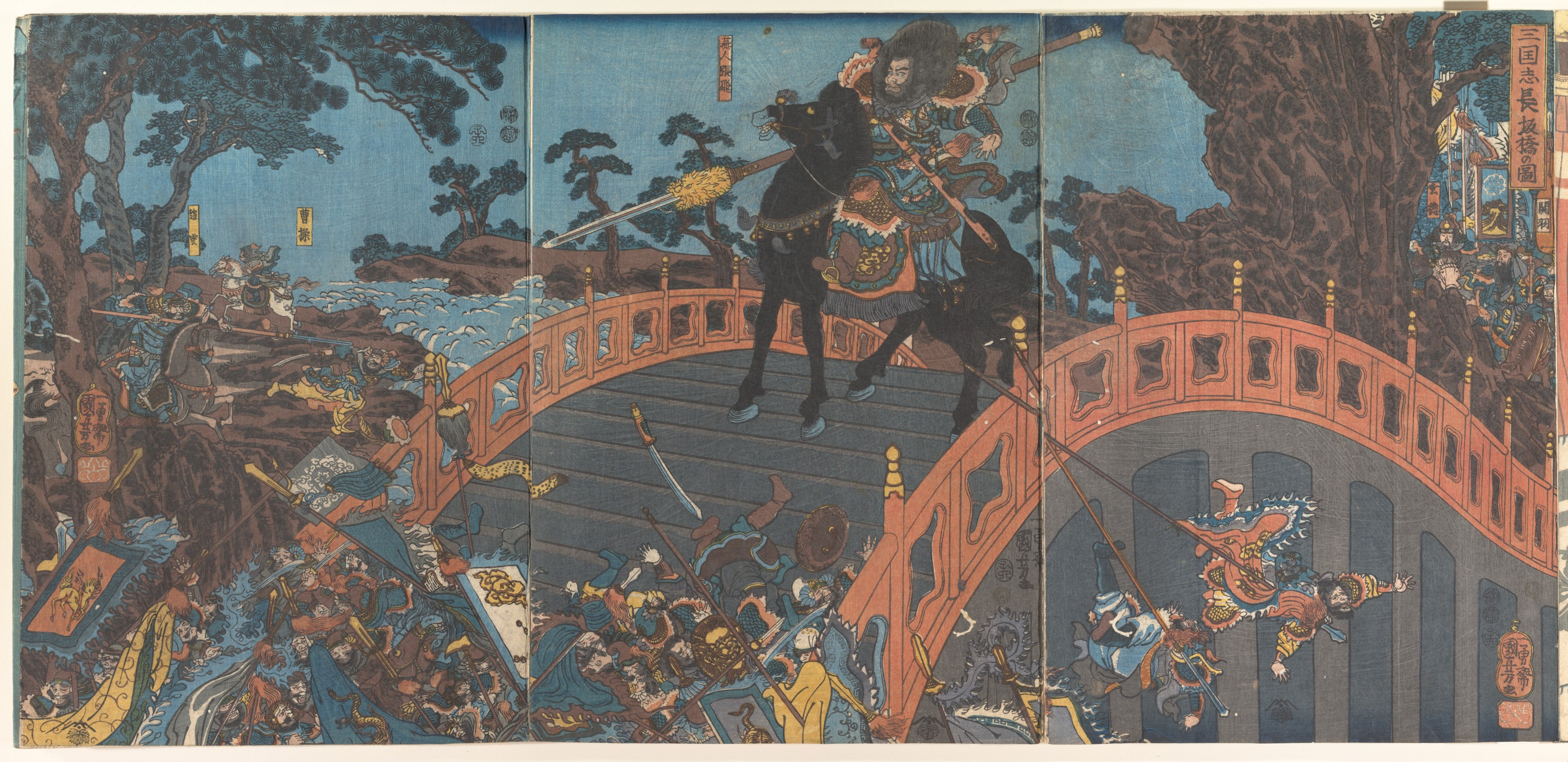
Print by Utagawa Kuniyoshi: The Three Kingdoms, Changban Bridge (1852). Center panel depicts Chohi [Zhang Fei] on a black horse; left panel depicts So So [Cao Cao] escaping on a white horse.

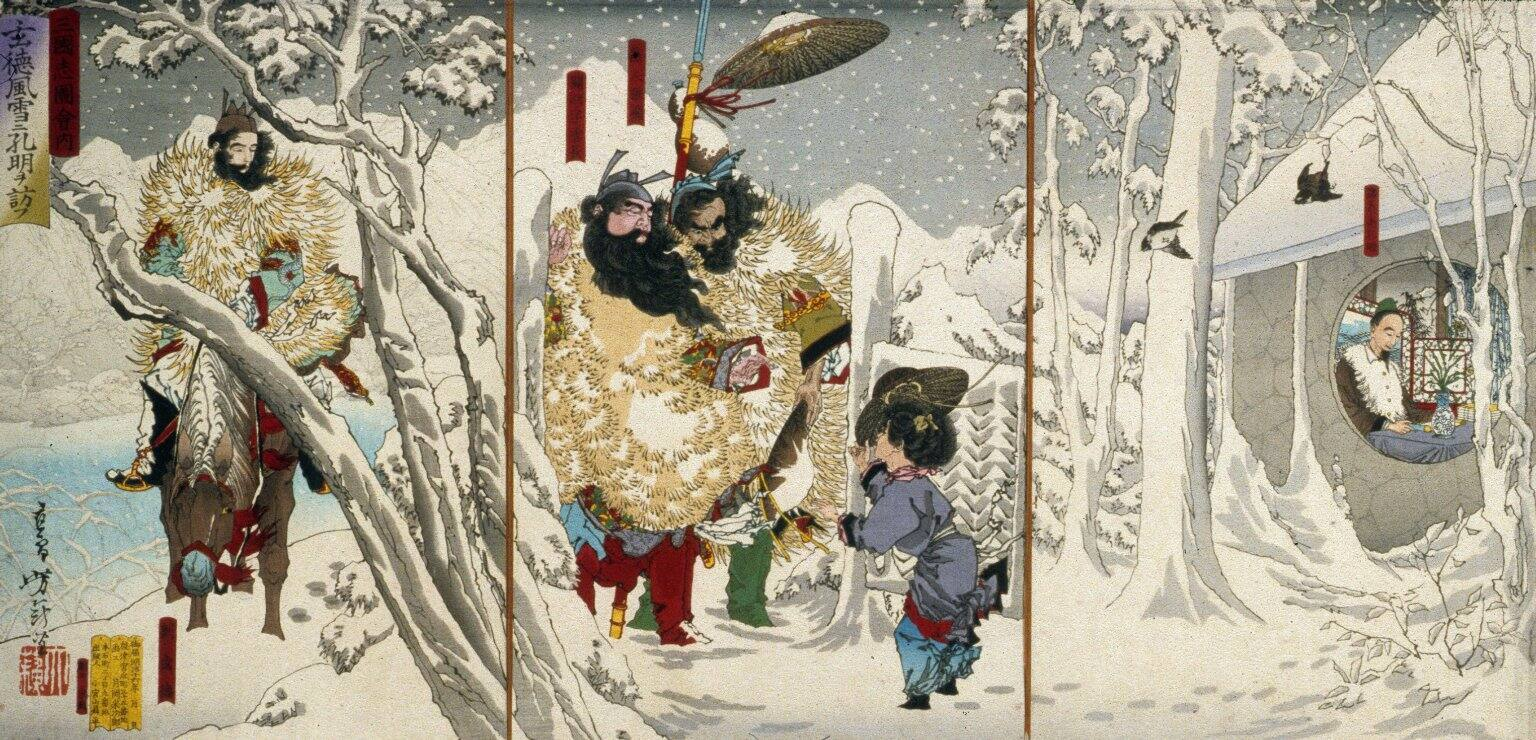
Print by Tsukioka Yoshitoshi: Gentoku Visits Kōmei in a Snowstorm (1883). Left: Gentokui [Liu Bei]; center: Kwanu [Guan Yu] and Chohi [Zhang Fei]; right: Kōmei [Zhuge Liang]

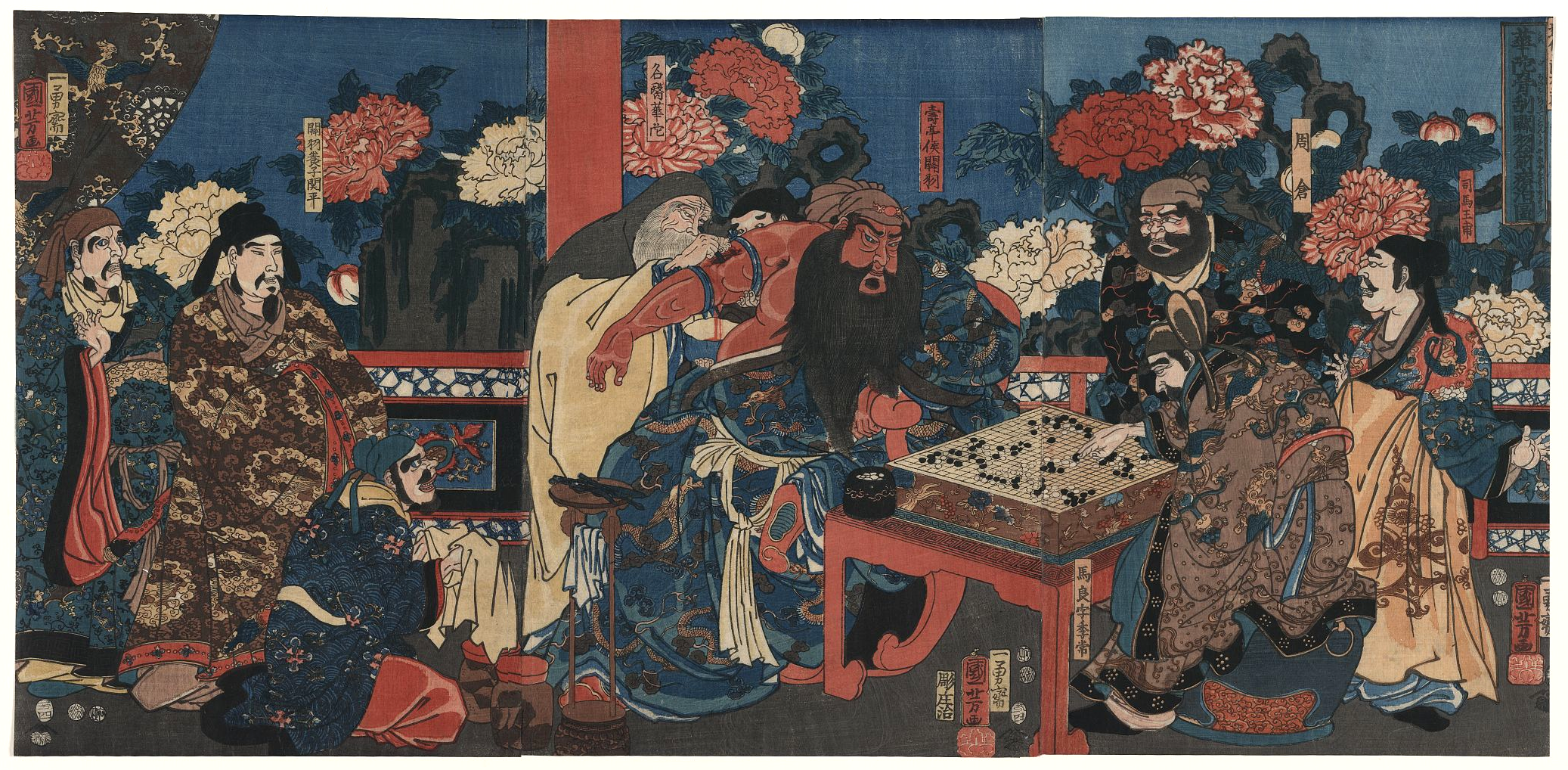
Print by Utagawa Kuniyosh: (1853): A Scene showing Doctor Hua Tuo attending Guan Yu's arm wound [by bone scraping]. Center: Guan Yu plays weiqi with Ma Liang as Dr. Hua Tuo operates; left: Guan Yu's adopted son, Guan Ping.
