= Ji Ben =

Han dynasty imperial physician (died 218)

- 吉本
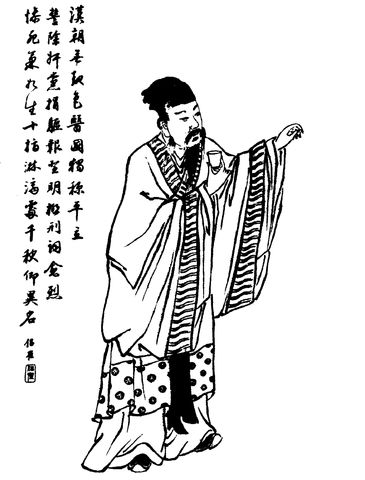
- A Qing dynasty illustration of Ji Ping (Ji Ben)

Court Physician (太醫令)
- In office ? – 218
- Monarch: Emperor Xian of Han
- Chancellor: Cao Cao

Personal details
- Born: Unknown
- Died: February or March 218
- Children: Ji Miao; Ji Mu
- Occupation: Physician
- Other names: Ji Tai (吉太); Ji Ping (吉平)

Ji Ben (died February or March 218) was an imperial physician who lived during the late Eastern Han dynasty of China. In 218, he started a rebellion with several others in the imperial capital, Xu (許; present-day Xuchang, Henan), but the revolt was suppressed and the conspirators were captured and executed.

== Error in name ==
Ji Ben's given name was actually "Pi" (丕; Pī). His name is believed to have been erroneously recorded as "Ben" (本; Běn) in historical texts to avoid naming taboo, because "Pi" was the personal name of Cao Pi, the first ruler of the Cao Wei state. Besides, the Chinese character for "Pi" might have actually been 㔻 instead of 丕. There were instances where 㔻 had been mistakenly written as 丕. (Note: 《三國志集解》在《三國志·武帝紀》提及太醫令吉本時說：: 趙一清曰：《後漢書·耿秉傳》作“吉㔻”，注“或作'平'”，則“本”字誤也。; 惠棟曰：隸法，“㔻”、“平”字相似，《三輔決錄》又作“本”也。; 《三國志辨誤》曰：東漢杜操字伯度，魏代避諱，易為“杜度”。裴氏引《決錄》注，本子邈、穆之字亦具載，而獨逸本字，殆亦以字易名，如杜度之例，故不可並書耶。; 李慈銘曰：㔻、本二字，每易相亂，如《後漢書·循吏傳》劉寵父丕，而《續漢書》作“本”是也。; 弼按：《常林傳》注引《魏略》、《鄧艾傳》注引《世語》均作“吉本”，或魏臣避文帝諱，改㔻為本，陳《志》仍其舊文也。; 《三國志·文帝紀》在提及文帝名諱時說：: 潘眉曰：闞澤雲“不十為丕”，字當作“㔻”，今作“丕”者，非。; 胡玉縉曰：潘說非也。 《說文·一部》：丕，大也。從一，不聲。段注：丕，隸書中直引長，故云“丕之字不十”。漢《石經》作“㔻”，可證。非與“丕”殊字也。段說甚瞭，潘氏以隸變駁篆文，顛矣。)

== Life ==
Ji Ben served as a court physician (太醫令) in the imperial court of the Eastern Han dynasty during the reign of Emperor Xian (r. 189–220). Around the time, the Han central government had fallen under the control of Cao Cao, the Imperial Chancellor. Emperor Xian was merely a figurehead ruler. In 216, Emperor Xian granted Cao Cao the title of a vassal king – King of Wei (魏王) – and allowed him to establish a vassal kingdom in northern China which was still nominally under the Han administration.

In late 217 or early 218, Ji Ben plotted a rebellion in the imperial capital, Xu (許; present-day Xuchang, Henan), together with several others, including: Geng Ji (耿紀), a Minister Steward (少府); Wei Huang (韋晃), a Director of Justice (司直); Jin Yi; his sons Ji Miao (吉邈; courtesy name Wenran (文然)) and Ji Mu (吉穆; courtesy name Siran (思然)). Their plan was to kill Wang Bi (王必), a Chief Clerk (長史) serving under Cao Cao, after which they would take Emperor Xian hostage, attack Cao Cao's vassal kingdom, and render assistance to Cao's rival Liu Bei, a warlord who controlled parts of southern and western China. Around the time, Liu Bei's general Guan Yu was achieving success at the Battle of Fancheng against Cao Cao's general Cao Ren, while Cao Cao himself was away in Ye (in present-day Handan, Hebei) and had left Wang Bi in charge of Xu.

Ji Miao led the Ji family's retainers and other supporters, numbering about 1,000 people, to attack Wang Bi's camp at night and set fire to the gate. Jin Yi was very trusted by Wang Bi, so he used the opportunity to plant spies in Wang's camp before the revolt started. Wang Bi was injured in the arm by an arrow during the attack. As he was unaware of the true identities of the rebels, he escaped from the camp and sought shelter in Jin Yi's house, not knowing that Jin was actually one of the conspirators. Jin Yi's servants did not recognise Wang Bi and thought that he was Ji Miao, so they replied, "Is Chief Clerk Wang dead? Your plan has succeeded!" Wang Bi then left and headed to the south of Xu. With assistance from Yan Kuang (嚴匡), an Agriculture General of the Household (典農中郎將), Wang Bi succeeded in suppressing the revolt when he led troops back to his camp to attack the rebels and defeated them. Ji Ben and the conspirators were all captured and executed for treason. Wang Bi died from his wounds several days later.

== In Romance of the Three Kingdoms ==
Ji Ben is a minor character in Chapter 23 of the 14th-century historical novel Romance of the Three Kingdoms, which romanticises the events before and during the Three Kingdoms period. In the novel, Ji Ben is renamed Ji Tai (吉太) with the courtesy name Ping (平), hence he is referred to as Ji Ping (吉平). He serves as a physician in the Han imperial court. Around 199, Ji Ping gets involved in a plot masterminded by Dong Cheng, Liu Bei and others to assassinate Cao Cao. They have the tacit support of Emperor Xian, who had issued a secret imperial decree written in blood to Dong Cheng ordering him to get rid of Cao Cao. Cao Cao experiences chronic headaches and requires constant medical treatment, so Ji Ping thinks of adding poison to Cao Cao's medicine. However, Dong Cheng is betrayed by his servant Qin Qingtong (秦慶童), who reports his master's plan to Cao Cao. Ji Ping is arrested when he comes to serve medicine to Cao Cao and then severely tortured to force him to confess. Cao Cao even orders Ji Ping to be tortured in the presence of Dong Cheng and the others (excluding Liu Bei, who had already left the capital), who eventually admit to their roles in the assassination plot. Cao Cao has all of them arrested and executed along with their families.

== See also ==
- Lists of people of the Three Kingdoms
