= Jin Xuan =

Han dynasty official

- 金旋

Administrator of Wuling (武陵太守)
- In office ?–209?
- Monarch: Emperor Xian of Han
- Chancellor: Cao Cao (from 208)

General of the Household (中郎將)
- In office ?–209?

Consultant (議郎)
- In office ? - ?

Administrator of Hanyang (漢陽太守)
- In office ? - ?

Gentleman of the Yellow Gate (黃門侍郎)
- In office ? - ?

Personal details
- Born: Unknown Xi'an, Shaanxi
- Died: 209? Changde, Hunan
- Relations: Jin Midi (ancestor)
- Children: Jin Yi
- Occupation: Official
- Courtesy name: Yuanji (元機)

Jin Xuan (died 209?), courtesy name Yuanji, was an official who lived during the late Eastern Han dynasty of China.

== Life ==
Jin Xuan was a descendant of Jin Midi and was from Jingzhao Commandery (京兆郡; around present-day Xi'an, Shaanxi). He held several appointments in the Han central government, including Gentleman of the Yellow Gate (黃門侍郎), Administrator of Hanyang Commandery, and Consultant (議郎), and before receiving promotion to General of the Household (中郎將) concurrent to Administrator (太守) of Wuling Commandery (武陵郡; around present-day Changde, Hunan).

After the Battle of Red Cliffs in 208, the warlord Liu Bei set off to attack the four commanderies in southern Jing Province, namely Changsha, Guiyang, Lingling and Wuling. The Sanguozhi recorded that the Administrators of the four commanderies surrendered to Liu Bei, however the Sanfu Juelu zhu (三輔決錄注) records that Jin Xuan was killed in battle and Wuling Commandery became part of Liu Bei's territories.

== Family ==
Jin Xuan had a son, Jin Yi (金禕), whose courtesy name was Deyi (德禕). In 218, Jin Yi, along with Ji Ben, Geng Ji (耿紀), Wei Huang (韋晃) and others, started a rebellion in Xu (許; present-day Xuchang, Henan) against the warlord Cao Cao and injured Wang Bi (王必), an official serving under Cao Cao. The rebellion was eventually suppressed by Wang Bi and a general Yan Kuang (嚴匡). All the conspirators, including Jin Yi, were rounded up and executed.

== In Romance of the Three Kingdoms ==
Jin Xuan appears in chapter 53 of the 14th-century historical novel Romance of the Three Kingdoms as the Administrator of Wuling Commandery. At that time, Liu Bei sent his general Zhang Fei to attack Wuling Commandery. Jin Xuan wanted to resist the invaders but his Assistant Officer, Gong Zhi, advised him to surrender. The following day, Jin Xuan fought with Zhang Fei outside the city but was defeated and forced to retreat. However, he was betrayed by Gong Zhi, who killed him with an arrow shot to the face. Gong Zhi later surrendered Wuling to Zhang Fei.

== See also ==
- Lists of people of the Three Kingdoms
