= Jia Kui =

Jia Kui may refer to:

- Jia Kui (scholar) (賈逵), courtesy name Jingbo (景伯), Eastern Han dynasty scholar and astronomer; see Yin Mo
- Jia Kui (general) (賈逵), courtesy name Liangdao (梁道), official of the late Eastern Han dynasty and early Three Kingdoms period
