= 214 =

214 in various calendars
- Gregorian calendar: 214; CCXIV
- Ab urbe condita: 967
- Assyrian calendar: 4964
- Balinese saka calendar: 135–136
- Bengali calendar: −380 – −379
- Berber calendar: 1164
- Buddhist calendar: 758
- Burmese calendar: −424
- Byzantine calendar: 5722–5723
- Chinese calendar: 癸巳年 (Water Snake); 2911 or 2704 — to — 甲午年 (Wood Horse); 2912 or 2705
- Coptic calendar: −70 – −69
- Discordian calendar: 1380
- Ethiopian calendar: 206–207
- Hebrew calendar: 3974–3975
- Hindu calendars
- Vikram Samvat: 270–271
- Shaka Samvat: 135–136
- Kali Yuga: 3314–3315
- Holocene calendar: 10214
- Iranian calendar: 408 BP – 407 BP
- Islamic calendar: 421 BH – 420 BH
- Javanese calendar: 91–92
- Julian calendar: 214; CCXIV
- Korean calendar: 2547
- Minguo calendar: 1698 before ROC 民前1698年
- Nanakshahi calendar: −1254
- Seleucid era: 525/526 AG
- Thai solar calendar: 756–757
- Tibetan calendar: ཆུ་མོ་སྦྲུལ་ལོ་ (female Water-Snake); 340 or −41 or −813 — to — ཤིང་ཕོ་རྟ་ལོ་ (male Wood-Horse); 341 or −40 or −812

Year 214 (CCXIV) was a common year starting on Saturday of the Julian calendar. At the time, it was known as the Year of the Consulship of Messalla and Suetrius (or, less frequently, year 967 Ab urbe condita). The denomination 214 for this year has been used since the early medieval period, when the Anno Domini calendar era became the prevalent method in Europe for naming years.

== Events ==
=== By place ===
==== Roman Empire ====
- The kingdom of Osroene becomes a province of the Roman Empire.
- Caracalla's victories in Germany ensure his popularity within the Roman army.
- The defences of Rhaetia are reinforced, in the form of an uninterrupted stone wall.

==== Korea ====
- The Korean kingdom of Baekje attacks the Mohe tribes.
- Gusu becomes king of Baekje.

==== China ====
- Battle of Xiaoyao Ford: General Zhang Liao under the command of Cao Cao beats back Sun Quan at Hefei.
- Liu Bei takes Yi Province from his clansman Liu Zhang, forming the later basis for Shu Han during the Three Kingdoms period.
- Pang Tong dies in the hands of the enemy in an ambush at the Valley of the Fallen Phoenix.
- The conspiracy against Cao Cao was leaked, empress Fu Shou was arrested by Cao Cao and incarcerated to death.

== Births ==
- May 10 – Claudius Gothicus, Roman emperor (d. 270)
- September 9 – Aurelian, Roman emperor (d. 275)
- Cao Gan, Chinese prince and son of Cao Cao (d. 261)
- Diophantus, Greek mathematician (approximate date)
- Yang Huiyu, Chinese empress dowager (d. 278)

== Deaths ==
- Chogo of Baekje, Korean ruler
- Kuai Yue (or Yidu), Chinese politician and adviser
- Pang Tong, Chinese politician and adviser (b. 179)
- Peng Yang (or Yongnian), Chinese official (b. 178)
- Sun Qian, Chinese diplomat, general and politician
- Xun You, Chinese statesman and adviser (b. 157)
