= Li Zhuan =

3rd century Shu Han official and scholar

- 李譔

Right General of the Household (右中郎將)
- In office ?–?
- Monarch: Liu Shan

Attendant Counsellor (中散大夫)
- In office ?–?
- Monarch: Liu Shan

Supervisor (僕射)
- In office ?–?
- Monarch: Liu Shan

Crown Prince's Bodyguard (太子庶子)
- In office ?–?
- Monarch: Liu Shan

Personal details
- Born: Unknown Mianyang, Sichuan
- Died: between 258 and 263
- Parent: Li Ren (father)
- Occupation: Politician, scholar
- Courtesy name: Qinzhong (欽仲)

Li Zhuan (fl. 223 – early 260s), courtesy name Qinzhong, was a Chinese politician and of the state of Shu Han in the Three Kingdoms period of China.

== Life ==
Li Zhuan was from Fu County (涪縣), Zitong Commandery (梓潼郡), which is around present-day Mianyang, Sichuan. His father, Li Ren (李仁), whose courtesy name was Dexian (德賢), was a close friend of Yin Mo, who was from the same county as him. Li Ren and Yin Mo left their native Yi Province (covering present-day Sichuan and Chongqing) on a tour of Jing Province (covering present-day Hubei and Hunan), where they studied under the tutelage of Sima Hui and Song Zhong (宋忠; also known as Song Zhongzi 宋仲子).

Li Zhuan inherited his father's knowledge. Together with Yin Mo, he extensively studied the Five Classics and Hundred Schools of Thought, and became a learned scholar. Apart from academia and philosophy, he was also well-versed in various arts and crafts, mathematics, divination, medicine, archery and mechanics.

Li Zhuan started his career in the Shu Han state as an assistant scribe (書佐) before becoming a clerk (令史) to the Masters of Writing (尚書). In 238, after the Shu emperor Liu Shan designated his eldest son Liu Xuan as crown prince, he appointed Li Zhuan as a bodyguard (庶子) to Liu Xuan. Later, he reassigned/promoted Li Zhuan to various positions, including Supervisor (僕射), Attendant Counsellor (中散大夫) and Right General of the Household (右中郎將). Li Zhuan's main task, however, was to educate Liu Xuan. The crown prince also favoured Li Zhuan for his multiple talents and extensive knowledge. Despite his wealth of knowledge, Li Zhuan was not highly regarded or respected by his peers because of his frivolous behaviour and tendency to ridicule and scorn others.

Throughout his life as a scholar, Li Zhuan wrote commentaries, guides, annotations, etc., to a number of ancient texts, including the Yijing, Book of Documents, Mao Commentary, Etiquette and Ceremonial, Book of Rites, Rites of Zhou, Zuo Zhuan, and Taixuan Zhigui (太玄指歸). His writings followed the styles of Jia Kui and Ma Rong rather than that of Zheng Xuan. Although he had never met his contemporary Wang Su before, his works and interpretations of Confucianism turned out to be similar to Wang Su's. He died in the middle of the Jingyao era (258–263) of Liu Shan's reign.

One of Li Zhuan's peers, Chen Shu (陳術), who was from Hanzhong Commandery and whose courtesy name was Shenbo (申伯), was also well-known for being knowledgeable and multi-talented. Chen Shu wrote the seven-chapter Shi Bu (釋部), Yizhou Qijiu Zhuan (益部耆舊傳) and Yizhou Qijiu Zhi (益部耆舊志), and served as the administrator of three commanderies in Shu.

== See also ==
- Lists of people of the Three Kingdoms
