= Chen Gong =

Eastern Han adviser to warlord Lü Bu (died 199)

Chen Gong 陳宮
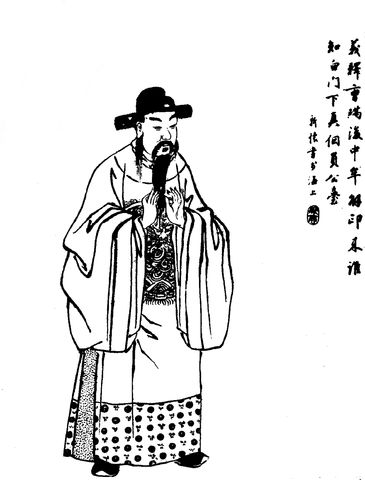
- A Qing dynasty illustration of Chen Gong
- Born: Unknown; Henan / Shandong
- Died: 7 February 199 (Note: The Zizhi Tongjian recorded that Lü Bu surrendered to Cao Cao on the guiyou day of the 12th month of the 3rd year of the Jian'an era of the reign of Emperor Xian of Han. He was executed on the same day along with Chen Gong and Gao Shun. This date corresponds to 7 February 199 in the Gregorian calendar.); Pizhou, Jiangsu
- Other name: Gongtai (公臺)
- Occupation: Adviser

Chen Gong (died 7 February 199), courtesy name Gongtai, was an adviser to the warlord Lü Bu in the late Eastern Han dynasty of China. However, he had started his career under another warlord, Cao Cao, before defecting to Lü Bu. He was executed along with Lü Bu and Gao Shun after Cao Cao defeated Lü Bu at the Battle of Xiapi.

Chen Gong was given a positive makeover in the 14th-century historical novel Romance of the Three Kingdoms, which romanticises the events before and during the Three Kingdoms period. In the novel, Chen Gong initially held office as a minor magistrate under the Han government, but he gave up his job after deciding to follow Cao Cao, who was then on the run after attempting to assassinate Dong Zhuo, a tyrannical warlord and regent who was holding the Emperor hostage. However, after witnessing Cao Cao killing Lü Boshe, he secretly left Cao Cao and ultimately joined Lü Bu. His eventual fate in the novel is similar to that in history.

== Life ==
Chen Gong was from Wuyang County (武陽縣), Dong Commandery, which is located at the border between present-day Henan and Shandong provinces. He joined Cao Cao around 190, at the time when regional warlords around China formed a coalition against Dong Zhuo, a powerful warlord who held Emperor Xian hostage in the imperial capital, Luoyang and former imperial capital, Chang'an, respectively. Chen Gong's most significant contribution while serving Cao Cao was the taking over of Yan Province (兖州; covering present-day western Shandong) in 193 through diplomatic efforts, a strategic move which laid down the foundation for Cao Cao's subsequent rise in power.

In 194, however, while Cao Cao was away on a campaign against Tao Qian in Xu Province (徐州; covering present-day northern Jiangsu), Chen Gong defected to a rival warlord, Lü Bu, along with his colleague, Zhang Miao. With the assistance of the two defectors, Lü Bu quickly took over most of Yan Province. Cao Cao hastily returned and laid siege on Lü Bu in Puyang (濮陽). After more than hundred days of stalemate, a famine forced Lü Bu to give up his position and seek refuge under Liu Bei, successor of Tao Qian, in Xiapi (下邳; present-day Pizhou, Jiangsu), capital of Xu Province.

In 196, Lü Bu turned on his host and took over Xiapi, proclaiming himself the governor of Xu Province and sending Liu Bei to the nearby county of Xiaopei (小沛).

In 198, Lü Bu launched an offensive against Liu Bei, who sought help from Cao Cao. This was one of Cao Cao's plots for he much desired the Xu Province. He placed two spies in Lü Bu's camp to sow discord between Lü Bu, Liu Bei and Chen Gong. These spies became the left and right advisers to Lü Bu and told him to attack Liu Bei. This was all against Chen Gong's advice. Cao Cao personally led his forces to attack Xiapi. When Cao Cao's army reached Pengcheng (彭城; present-day Xuzhou, Jiangsu), which was located east of Xiapi, Chen Gong advised Lü Bu to grasp the initiative to strike because he didn't know of Cao Cao's ploy but Lü Bu, heeding his wife's advice, decided to stay put. After initial attempts to break the siege failed, Lü Bu intended to surrender but was dissuaded by Chen Gong.

The siege dragged on for two months until Cao Cao ordered his troops to dig ditches to divert the Si River and Yi River (沂水) to flood Xiapi. On 7 February 199, Lü Bu's subjects Hou Cheng, Song Xian (宋憲) and Wei Xu (魏續) captured Chen Gong and defected with their troops. Lü Bu made a last stand on the city gate but was eventually overpowered and captured. When brought to Cao Cao, Chen Gong refused to return to his service and chose death so that the law could be upheld; Cao Cao had maintained a general rule that those who surrendered to him, after rejecting an initial call from him to surrender, would not be spared. Cao Cao was moved and provided for Chen Gong's family after Chen's death.

The heads of Lü Bu, Chen Gong, Gao Shun and some of Lü Bu's other followers were sent to Xuchang, capital of Cao Cao.

== In Romance of the Three Kingdoms ==
Romance of the Three Kingdoms, a 14th-century historical novel by Luo Guanzhong, is a romanticisation of the events that occurred before and during the Three Kingdoms period. In this dramatised version of history, Chen Gong was credited with much undue moral righteousness and craftiness, perhaps to accentuate the unscrupulousness of Cao Cao and incompetence of Lü Bu.

=== Meeting and parting with Cao Cao ===
The first incident that illustrates the righteousness of Chen Gong comes in Chapter 4, where Cao Cao was fleeing from Luoyang after a failed assassination attempt on Dong Zhuo. At Zhongmu County, where Chen Gong was serving as the county magistrate, Cao Cao was captured. When Chen Gong interrogated the fugitive, he was so impressed with Cao Cao's loyalty to the Emperor that he decided to abandon his job and join Cao Cao, who planned to return to his home in Chenliu (陳留; around present-day Kaifeng, Henan) to raise an army against Dong Zhuo.

Along the journey, they passed by the house of Lü Boshe, a sworn brother of Cao Cao's father. There, they killed Lü Boshe's family by mistake, while Cao Cao personally murdered Lü in cold blood later. Chen Gong was shocked by what he witnessed. That night, as Cao Cao slept, Chen Gong considered killing him, but thought it unrighteous to do so. He instead left Cao Cao and travelled to his own hometown in Dong Commandery (東郡; near present-day Puyang, Henan).

=== Battle of Puyang ===
Chen Gong's most brilliant, albeit fictitious, manoeuvre came during the Battle of Puyang, when Cao Cao's forces laid siege on Lü Bu in Puyang (濮陽). The incident was described in Chapter 12. Chen Gong, who was then serving Lü Bu, plotted to lure Cao Cao into the city by having a local send a letter to Cao Cao feigning to collude with the latter. The delighted Cao Cao personally led a force deep into the city before realising he had fallen into a trap. At a signal, fires were lit at all the city gates and Lü Bu's troops cut off the evasion routes. Cao Cao barely escaped with his life in the battle and had a narrow face-to-face encounter with Lü Bu, who did not recognise him and allowed him to slip away. Later in Chapter 60, when Zhang Song visited Cao Cao as an emissary from the warlord Liu Zhang, he mocked Cao Cao's past failures by mentioning the Battle of Puyang and other notable battles that Cao Cao lost.

== In popular culture ==
=== Comics ===
Chen Gong appears as a character in the Hong Kong manhua The Ravages of Time illustrated by Chan Mou.

=== Video games ===
- Chen Gong appears as a playable character in Koei's video games such as Dynasty Warriors 8: Xtreme Legends and the Romance of the Three Kingdoms series.
- Chen Gong appears as a playable Caster Class Servant in the game Fate/Grand Order, by Aniplex.
- Chen Gong appears as a unique legendary Strategist hero in Total War: Three Kingdoms, serving under Lü Bu's faction.

=== Manga ===
Chen Gong has a minor role as a supporter of Lü Bu in the manga Record of Ragnarok, cheering on his lord as he fights against the Norse god Thor to decide humanity's fate. He retains this role in both the anime and stage play adaptations of the series.

== See also ==
- Lists of people of the Three Kingdoms
