= Sima Hui =

Early 3rd century Chinese hermit and teacher

Sima Hui 司馬徽
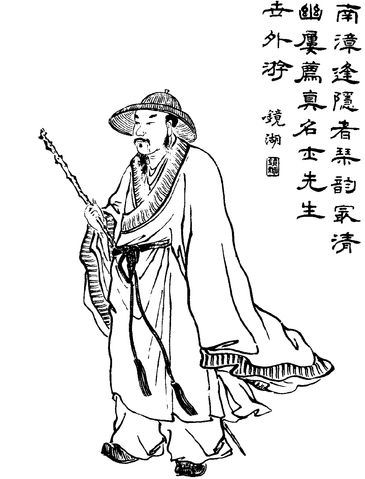
- A Qing dynasty illustration of Sima Hui
- Born: Unknown; Yuzhou, Henan
- Died: 208
- Other names: Decao (德操) "Shuijing" (水鏡)

Sima Hui (died 208), courtesy name Decao and pseudonym Shuijing, (Note: The Xiangyang Ji recorded that Pang Degong was the one who gave Sima Hui his "Shuijing" pseudonym; Degong also gave Zhuge Liang the pseudonym "Wolong" and Pang Tong "Fengchu".) was a hermit who lived during the late Eastern Han dynasty of China.

== Life ==
Sima Hui was from Yangzhai County (陽翟縣), Yingchuan Commandery, which is around present-day Yuzhou, Henan. He lived in northern Jing Province, which covered present-day Hubei and Hunan. He is popularly remembered as the one who recommended Zhuge Liang and Pang Tong (Note: Pang Tong's biography in Records of the Three Kingdoms recorded that just before Pang Tong reached adulthood (around 19 years old), he visited Sima Hui, who was famous for spotting and recommending men of talent. They came to a mulberry tree, where Sima Hui climbed up to get the fruit while Pang Tong sat below, and they chatted for a whole day until nightfall. Sima Hui felt that Pang Tong was an extraordinary person and called Pang the "Crown of Scholars in Jing Province" (南州士之冠冕). Furthermore, he remarked, "Pang Degong really knows how to judge people. This is truly a boy of majestic moral character." Subsequently, Pang Tong started gaining more recognition among the scholar-gentry. This anecdote was also included as an annotation in vol.02 of Shishuo Xinyu.) to the warlord Liu Bei in the 14th-century historical novel Romance of the Three Kingdoms. (Note: The Xiangyang Ji also recorded that Sima Hui was the one who recommended Zhuge Liang and Pang Tong to Liu. His friend Pang Degong (龐德公; Pang Tong's uncle) was the one who gave Zhuge and Pang their nicknames.) Sima Hui was also Xiang Lang's teacher. Yin Mo and Li Zhuan's father Li Ren were recorded to have travelled to Jingzhou together to study the ancient texts under Sima Hui and Song Zhong.

Sima Hui was known to never mention others' shortcomings or flaws. His reply to both good and bad news would always be "hao" (好; literally "good" or "yes"). When someone asked him, "How are you?", he replied, "Good." When somebody told him that their son had died, he said, "Very good." His wife chided him for that, saying, "Everyone sees you as a person of good moral conduct so they are willing to share their problems with you. Why do you say 'very good' when someone tells you that his son had died?" Sima Hui replied, "It's also good to hear what you've just said." This gave rise to the Chinese idiom haohao xiansheng (好好先生; literally "Mr. Yes" or "Mr. Good").

The warlord Cao Cao attempted to recruit Sima Hui after taking control of Jing Province in 208. However, Sima Hui died of illness before Cao Cao could make any significant use of the hermit's talents.

== In Romance of the Three Kingdoms ==
In Chapter 37 of the 14th-century historical novel Romance of the Three Kingdoms, Sima Hui, nicknamed Water Mirror, is described to be a carefree, wandering man who is well-versed in many arts. He has a close relationship with Pang Tong, and refers to Pang Tong as a younger brother.

Sima Hui is also featured in Chan Mou's manhua The Ravages of Time as the teacher of the "Eight Enigmas", a group of elite strategists and advisers.

== In popular culture ==
Sima Hui is portrayed by Wang Shijun in the 2010 Chinese television series Three Kingdoms.

== See also ==
- Lists of people of the Three Kingdoms
