= AD 179 =

179 in various calendars
- Gregorian calendar: 179; CLXXIX
- Ab urbe condita: 932
- Assyrian calendar: 4929
- Balinese saka calendar: 100–101
- Bengali calendar: −415 – −414
- Berber calendar: 1129
- Buddhist calendar: 723
- Burmese calendar: −459
- Byzantine calendar: 5687–5688
- Chinese calendar: 戊午年 (Earth Horse); 2876 or 2669 — to — 己未年 (Earth Goat); 2877 or 2670
- Coptic calendar: −105 – −104
- Discordian calendar: 1345
- Ethiopian calendar: 171–172
- Hebrew calendar: 3939–3940
- Hindu calendars
- Vikram Samvat: 235–236
- Shaka Samvat: 100–101
- Kali Yuga: 3279–3280
- Holocene calendar: 10179
- Iranian calendar: 443 BP – 442 BP
- Islamic calendar: 457 BH – 456 BH
- Javanese calendar: 55–56
- Julian calendar: 179; CLXXIX
- Korean calendar: 2512
- Minguo calendar: 1733 before ROC 民前1733年
- Nanakshahi calendar: −1289
- Seleucid era: 490/491 AG
- Thai solar calendar: 721–722
- Tibetan calendar: ས་ཕོ་རྟ་ལོ་ (male Earth-Horse); 305 or −76 or −848 — to — ས་མོ་ལུག་ལོ་ (female Earth-Sheep); 306 or −75 or −847

Year 179 (CLXXIX) was a common year starting on Thursday of the Julian calendar. At the time, it was known as the Year of the Consulship of Aurelius and Verus (or, less frequently, year 932 Ab urbe condita). The denomination 179 for this year has been used since the early medieval period, when the Anno Domini calendar era became the prevalent method in Europe for naming years.

== Events ==
=== By place ===
==== Roman empire ====
- The Roman fort Castra Regina ("fortress by the Regen river") is built at Regensburg, on the right bank of the Danube in Germany.
- Roman legionaries of Legio II Adiutrix engrave on the rock of the Trenčín Castle (Slovakia) the name of the town Laugaritio, marking the northernmost point of Roman presence in that part of Europe.
- Marcus Aurelius drives the Marcomanni over the Danube and reinforces the border. To repopulate and rebuild a devastated Pannonia, Rome allows the first German colonists to enter territory controlled by the Roman Empire.

==== Asia ====
- Abgar IX the Great becomes King of Edessa.
- Gogukcheon succeeds his father Shindae as King of Goguryeo.
- Han dynasty China: The full title of the Nine Chapters on the Mathematical Art appears on two bronze standard measures dated to this year, yet there is speculation that the same book existed beforehand only under different titles. In the 3rd century, Liu Hui would provide commentary on this important early Chinese mathematical treatise.

== Births ==
- Pang Tong, Chinese adviser of warlord Liu Bei (d. 214)
- Sima Yi, Chinese general and regent (d. 251)

== Deaths ==
- Beautiful Lady Yu, Chinese concubine and imperial consort
- Myeongnim Dap-bu, Korean prime minister (b. AD 67)
- Sindae of Goguryeo, Korean ruler (b. AD 89)
- Wang Fu, Chinese court eunuch
