= Zhang Ren =

Late Han Dynasty general serving warlord Liu Zhang (died 213)

Zhang Ren 張任
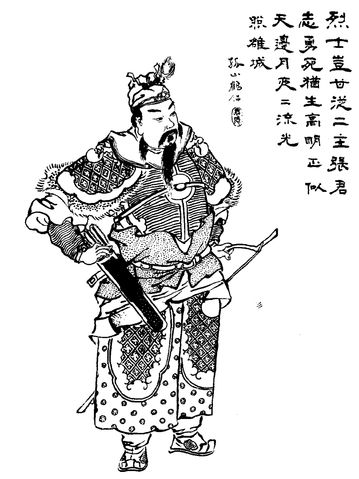
- A Qing dynasty illustration of Zhang Ren

Assistant Officer (從事) (under Liu Zhang)
- In office ?–213
- Monarch: Emperor Xian of Han

Personal details
- Born: Unknown Chengdu, Sichuan
- Died: 213 Guanghan, Sichuan
- Resting place: Guanghan, Sichuan
- Occupation: Military general

Zhang Ren (died 213) was a Chinese military general serving under the warlord Liu Zhang during the late Eastern Han dynasty of China.

== Life ==
Zhang Ren was from Shu Commandery (蜀郡), Yi Province, which is around present-day Chengdu, Sichuan. He had a humble family background, and was known for his courage and loyalty since he was young. He was recruited to serve as an Assistant Officer (從事) in the provincial office under Liu Zhang, the Governor of Yi Province.

In 212, the warlord Liu Bei launched a campaign to seize control of Yi Province from Liu Zhang. Liu Zhang ordered his officers Liu Gui (劉璝), Leng Bao (冷苞), Zhang Ren, Deng Xian (鄧賢) and others to lead troops to Fu (涪; in present-day Mianyang, Sichuan) to resist Liu Bei, but they were defeated and forced to retreat to Mianzhu (緜竹).

Zhang Ren and Liu Zhang's son, Liu Xun, moved to a garrison at Luo (雒; north of present-day Guanghan, Sichuan). When Liu Bei's forces showed up, Zhang Ren led his men to engage the enemy at Yan Bridge (鴈橋) but was defeated and captured alive. Liu Bei had heard of Zhang Ren's reputation for being brave and loyal so he asked Zhang to surrender. However, Zhang Ren replied sternly, "I'll never serve two lords." He was then executed. Liu Bei felt it was a pity.

== Zhang Ren Tomb ==
Zhang Ren's grave is located in Weigan Village (桅杆村), Beiwai District (北外鄉), Guanghan, Sichuan. During the reign of the Jiaqing Emperor in the Qing dynasty, the local government erected a tombstone for the grave with the words "Tomb of the Han General Zhang Ren" (漢將軍張公任之墓) inscribed on it. In 1954, a brick bearing the words "Built in the 8th month of the 6th year of Yuankang" was unearthed at the site of the tomb. The brick serves as evidence that the tomb was constructed in as early as 296 during the Yuankang era (291–300) of the reign of Emperor Hui in the Western Jin dynasty. In July 1990, the tomb became a Historical and Cultural Site Protected at the County Level under the Guanghan administration.

== In Romance of the Three Kingdoms ==
Zhang Ren appears in chapters 60–64 of the historical novel Romance of the Three Kingdoms, which romanticises the events in the late Eastern Han dynasty and the Three Kingdoms period. Like his historical counterpart, Zhang Ren serves under Liu Zhang and is known for being very loyal to his lord. When Liu Bei first enters Yi Province in the name of helping Liu Zhang counter a rival warlord, Zhang Lu, Zhang Ren and others warn Liu Zhang to be wary of Liu Bei and take precautionary measures, but Liu Zhang ignores them. When Liu Zhang attends a banquet hosted by Liu Bei, Liu Bei's strategist Pang Tong instructs the general Wei Yan to pretend to perform a sword dance and use the opportunity to assassinate Liu Zhang. Zhang Ren senses danger so he draws his sword and pretends to join the sword dance while secretly protecting Liu Zhang from Wei Yan's advances. When war breaks out between Liu Bei and Liu Zhang, Zhang Ren sets up an ambush at the Valley of the Fallen Phoenix, where his archers kill Pang Tong. After Zhang Ren is captured alive, Liu Bei asks him to surrender but he firmly refuses and is executed. Liu Bei feels it was a pity so he has Zhang Ren buried with full honours.

== See also ==
- Lists of people of the Three Kingdoms
