= The Ravages of Time =

Comics series by Chan Mou

- Cover of The Ravages of Time volume 16

火鳳燎原
- Genre: Philosophical, psychological, wuxia
- Author: Chan Mou
- Publisher: Tong Li Comics (Hong Kong and Taiwan); Shanghai 99 Readers' Culture Co., Ltd. and People's Literature Publishing House (Chinese mainland); Guizhou People's Press,華文天下 (Chinese mainland, Collector's Edition)
- Other publishers: Media Factory (Japan) Burapat Comics (Thailand) Chinabooks E.Wolf (Switzerland)
- Magazine: 新少年週刊 (Hong Kong) 新少年快報 (Taiwan); Sangokushi Magazine (Japan)
- Original run: June 15, 2001
- Collected volumes: 80

The Ravages of Time
- Traditional Chinese: 火鳳燎原
- Simplified Chinese: 火凤燎原
- Literal meaning: The Fiery Phoenix Razes the Steppes
Transcriptions

The Ravages of Time is an ongoing Hong Kong manhua series created by Chan Mou. It re-tells the events in the late Han dynasty and Three Kingdoms period of Chinese history, with the story largely revolving around the many exploits of a young Sima Yi.

The series is known for exercising a large degree of creativity in several aspects and people from the Three Kingdoms. While the milestone events were left relatively untouched (e.g. outcomes of major battles, death of certain characters), many finer details were changed and largely dramatized. For example, Sima Yi is portrayed in the story to be much older than his historical counterpart. Other characters such as Liu Bei, Zhao Yun, Zhang Fei, Diaochan and Lü Bu are also portrayed differently from historical accounts and popular conception.

The plot puts a good deal of focus on the politics and warfare of the Three Kingdoms period, as such one of the main attraction of the series are the associated mind games, military strategies and tactics. However, Chan Mou also regularly zooms in on the personal developments of the main protagonists, detailing their dynamic responses and attitudes to the events unfolding around them.

The Ravages of Time is currently serialized in Hong Kong, Taiwan, and Japan, with compiled volumes published in Mainland China, Korea, Thailand, Vietnam and Singapore as well. It is one of the few manhua of its format to reach such an extensive foreign market.

== Plot ==
The Ravages of Time is a spinoff of the 14th-century historical novel Romance of the Three Kingdoms. It tells the exploits of Liu Bei, Cao Cao, the Sun family, and other people from that period, from the point of view of the two main characters, Feng and Liaoyuan Huo, whose names collectively form the Chinese title of the manhua.

Sima Yi is the young, unofficial leader of the Sima clan, a highly successful and rich merchant family with strong influence in politics and the economy. Unknown to people outside the clan, the elders have long deferred their power to Sima Yi, believing that he will bring prosperity to their clan, due to his flair for spotting profitable business ventures at a young age. The clan members operate out of public sight and position themselves where they can maximize their profits regardless of the political situation. They command a group of mercenary assassins, known as the Handicapped Warriors (殘兵), who assist them in manipulating politics. The mercenaries are reputed to be all disabled, but have developed special abilities for conducting assassinations. They are led by Liaoyuan Huo, said to be a "one-eyed" assassin and the best one in the land.

The story begins with the Handicapped Warriors assassinating Xu Lin, an advisor to Dong Zhuo, to prevent Dong's advances in subduing the various merchant clans.

As the story progresses, Sima Yi and Liaoyuan Huo are reluctantly drawn into the wars of the late Han dynasty period. Sima ends up at the mercy of Cao Cao, while Liaoyuan Huo is forced to take on a new identity as "Zhao Yun" and serve under Liu Bei to create opportunities for Sima Yi. A rift gradually starts developing between the two former close friends.

Throughout the series, Sima Yi, Liaoyuan Huo and the Handicapped Warriors are frequently shown to be the catalyst of historical events in the story. They are involved in causing Dong Zhuo's downfall, Cao Cao's rise to power, the Battle of Xu Province, Battle of Puyang, Sun Ce's rise to power, etc. Their involvement is a common thread that runs throughout the narrative.

The story also centers on another eight characters, the "Eight Enigmas" (八奇), a group of elite military strategists trained by Sima Hui, who is also known as Shuijing (水鏡). They comprise Yuan Fang (a fictional character), Xun Yu, Jia Xu, Guo Jia, Zhou Yu, Pang Tong, Zhuge Liang, and an unknown eighth member. Each of the Eight Enigmas has his own motivation for choosing a ruler to follow, and some chapters are devoted to revealing their ultimate intents and moral stances.

=== Story arcs ===
The main story arcs include:

1. Dong Zhuo's arc
2. Cao Cao's rise to power arc
3. Liu Bei and Xuzhou arc
4. Sun Ce's rise to power arc
5. Battle of Xiapi
6. Battle of Xiapi outcomes
7. Yuan Shu's arc
8. Sun Ce Vs the Taiping Cult arc
9. Battle of Guandu
10. Battle of Chibi
11. The Four Commanderies arc

After volume 27, with the destruction of the Sima clan, Sima Yi submits to Cao Cao and he plots vengeance. This leads to the next arc featuring Lü Bu's downfall, which ends in volume 32 with the death of Lü Bu. Starting from volume 36, the storyline simultaneously covers the continued rise and death of Sun Ce and the beginning of Cao Cao's battle with Yuan Shao. The Battle of Guandu officially ends in volume 44, in which the Yuan clan's stance is shaken with the loss in Guandu and the death of Yuan Shao. Taking over from there are the events leading to the Battle of Wuhuan. Beginning with volume 49, the story has focused on the battle of Chibi or Red Cliff, which occurred following Cao Cao's invasion in the south.

== Character designs ==
All characters in the manhua have their own unique designs, in contrast to the general perception that Chinese people of that period have long hair, and that it was social taboo to cut one's hair. Many characters have bizarre and distinctive facial designs that distinguish themselves from one another. For example, Zhang Fei, traditionally depicted as a bearded chubby man, is portrayed as an artist who painted his face to resemble a Chinese opera mask. Zhao Yun is described to be a skillful assassin who cannot experience physical sensations. Liu Bei's hair style and facial design mirror the stereotypical "White Jesus". Other characters in the story feature tons of bizarre but memorable and interesting designs. Some characters have different hair colour, weird hairstyles, tattoos, facial markings, clothing and equipment more akin to that of other genres, such as fantasy and wuxia.

== Themes ==
The story of The Ravages of Time revolves around battles in the late Han dynasty and Three Kingdoms era, military doctrines, mind games, ethics and philosophy.

=== Military doctrines ===
The manhua usually interweave military doctrines in the story, showing how the characters use the same doctrine to achieve victory. A doctrine can sometimes be used as the theme for the whole volume.

=== Morale ===
According to the manhua, morale plays an important role as the backbone of the military. It serves as the will of soldiers to fight. Without morale, an army cannot function. Hence, the generals and advisors in the story often seek ways, including both orthodox and unorthodox means, to bolster morale.

Of particular interest is Sima Hui's fictional Discourse on Morale (Chinese: 士氣論; pinyin: Shìqì Lùn). It is an article on how to prevent morale from dissipating when facing a stronger enemy. Its main points are:

1. If an enemy general attains victory early in the battle, blame your own general's recklessness.
2. If an enemy general still attains victory, rebuke your own advisors for reading the situation incorrectly.
3. If an enemy general always attains victory, brand him as one having courage but lacking in strategy (Chinese: 有勇無謀; pinyin: Yǒu yǒng wú móu).

=== Assassination ===
Assassination is considered as a valid tactic, after diplomacy and strategical ploys. A number of characters in the manhua are assassins, such as Zhao Yun, Dian Wei and Zhang Liao. In addition, the tactic of faking death and letting opponents believe that the assassination attempt has succeeded is also used and is often used by Sun Ce and Lü Bu in particular. The fictional character Yuan Fang's assassination led to Cao Cao's uniting the north.

=== Thought Process of the Eight Enigmas ===
It has been hinted throughout the story that the Eight Enigmas think differently from the conventional military advisor. Here are some instances when some insights are revealed about their thinking process.

1. In chapter 102, volume 13, Chen Gong stated that the Enigmas think of all enemy generals as a "God of War". "God of War" is a title attributed to Lü Bu, a peerless general in the manhua.
2. In chapter 119, volume 15, Chen Gong confronts Sima Yi, "A military advisor must not just consider the opponent's next step. He should also have the foresight of a merchant".
3. However, in chapter 149, volume 18, Zhou Yu said that the first step to comprehend the Eight Enigmas' thinking process is to acquire what one needs according to the current situation.

=== The Best Strategy Ever ===
The "Best Strategy Ever" has been often repeated by Lü Bu, Cao Cao and Pang Tong, among others, and it goes as "The best strategy is to let your opponent know your next move. Even better is to let your opponent know your next two moves".

=== Mind games ===
Beside military tactics, characters in the manhua engaged in numerous misdirections and feints to confuse and befuddle their enemies, such as deliberately letting their enemy know their next move in a battle, going along with an enemy's plan to gain certain advantages and more.

=== Ethics ===
A common recurring theme throughout the manhua is that of ethics. It questions traditional Chinese views on loyalty and touches on the utilitarian and the moral rights models of ethics.

Two of the Eight Enigmas, Guo Jia and Jia Xu, as well as Sima Yi and Lü Bu, believed that ending the fight quickly was the best for the people (a form of negative utilitarianism), regardless of the methods used or how many innocents had to die. As long as the civil war can be ended quickly, it is the best for all the people.

Zhuge Liang and Xun Yu opposed this line of thinking, maintaining the peace and order brought by adhering to the traditional teachings and through just and benevolent means lasts longer. The conflicts between these two belief systems recurs throughout the manhua.

=== Morals ===
The manhua took a skeptical view of morals, especially the values, laid down by the sages in the Zhou dynasty. Lü Bu openly showed disdain for them on a couple of occasions, especially during the Battle of Puyang, and in volume 27 in the duel against Guan Yu. Sun Ce used it as a tactic to boost the morale of his troops. Liu Bang, founder of the Han dynasty, was also referred to as having done all sort of questionable acts, but was still revered as a good ruler.

=== Historical inaccuracy ===
Another prevalent theme in the manhua is that history is subjective. Chen Gong said, "All histories are subjective. In the eyes of all rulers, all their generals are as strong as Lü Bu". Liu Bei maintained that there were no bad emperors; historical records made ill of some of them to justify the beginnings of new a dynasty. On one occasion, Zhang Fei expected himself to be inaccurately depicted in historical records. In another occasion, a court historian is invited by Chen Gong in order to dramatize Lü Bu's status as a god of war. Chan Mou has also expressed this idea in some interviews.
