= Lü Boshe =

Acquaintance of Cao Cao

Lü Boshe 呂伯奢
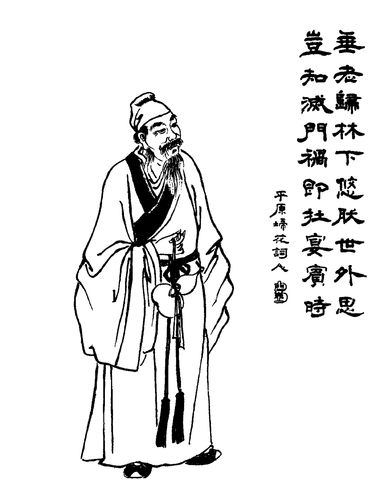
- A Qing dynasty illustration of Lü Boshe

Lü Boshe was an acquaintance of Cao Cao, a prominent warlord who rose to power towards the end of the Eastern Han dynasty and established the foundation of the state of Cao Wei in the Three Kingdoms period of China. According to historical sources, Cao Cao killed Lü Boshe's family in 189 or 190 when he passed by Lü's house on his way home to Chenliu (陳留; around present-day Kaifeng, Henan) after escaping from the imperial capital, Luoyang. Cao Cao's motive behind the murders remains ambiguous. One source claimed that he killed Lü Boshe's family in self-defence while two other texts stated that he suspected that Lü's family were plotting to harm him so he killed them preemptively. This event was dramatised in the 14th-century historical novel Romance of the Three Kingdoms, in which Lü Boshe himself also died at the hands of Cao Cao.

== In historical records ==
There are three accounts of the murders of Lü Boshe's family.

The Wei Shu (魏書) recorded:

Cao Cao foresaw that Dong Zhuo was doomed to failure so he refused to accept Dong's appointment and escaped back to his hometown. He was accompanied by a few horsemen and they passed by Chenggao (成臯; around present-day Xingyang, Henan) on the journey. There lived Lü Boshe, an acquaintance of Cao Cao. Lü Boshe was not at home at that time. His sons and other guests attempted to rob Cao Cao of his horse and personal belongings. Cao Cao killed several of them.

The Wei Jin Shiyu (魏晋世語) recorded:

Cao Cao passed by Lü Boshe's house. Lü Boshe was out but his five sons were at home. They welcomed Cao Cao like a guest and hosted a banquet for him. Cao Cao was on the run from Dong Zhuo at the time and he suspected that they were plotting to harm him. He killed eight persons that night and fled.

The Zaji (雜記) by Sun Sheng (Note: In his Weishi Chunqiu, Sun also attributed a similar quote to Sima Zhao as he killed Zheng Xiaotong, grandson of Zheng Xuan. The excerpt quoted by Li Xian differs from the excerpt cited by Pei Songzhi in Cao Mao's biography in Sanguozhi.) recorded:

Cao Cao heard the sounds of cooking utensils (probably knives) and suspected that they (Lü Boshe's family) were plotting to harm him, so he killed them that night and fled. Afterwards, he heartrendingly remarked, "I'd rather do wrong to others than allow them to do wrong to me!" (寧我負人，毋人負我！) He then continued on his journey.

== In Romance of the Three Kingdoms ==
The incident was dramatised in Chapter 4 of the 14th-century historical novel Romance of the Three Kingdoms.

In the novel, Lü Boshe is a sworn brother of Cao Cao's father, Cao Song, so Cao Cao regards him as an uncle. Cao Cao and Chen Gong pass by Lü Boshe's house while they are on their way to Cao Cao's home after Cao Cao escaped from Luoyang following his failed attempt on Dong Zhuo's life. Lü Boshe gives them a warm reception and instructs his family and servants to treat the guests well while he travels to town to purchase more items for a feast. During their stay in Lü Boshe's house, Cao Cao overhears the sharpening of knives and a conversation among Lü Boshe's servants about whether to "kill or to tie up first". He suspects that Lü Boshe is pretending to be hospitable towards him while actually plotting to harm him. He and Chen Gong dash out and indiscriminately kill everyone in Lü Boshe's household. Later, they discover that the servants were actually talking about slaughtering a pig for the feast and that they had killed innocent people. As it is too late for regrets, Cao Cao and Chen Gong immediately pack their belongings and leave the house. Along the way, they meet Lü Boshe, who is returning from his errand. When Lü Boshe asks them to stay, Cao Cao asks him: "Who is that behind you?" When Lü Boshe turns around, Cao Cao stabs him from behind and kills him. A shocked Chen Gong asks Cao Cao: "Just now, you made a genuine mistake when you killed those people. But what about now?". Cao Cao replies: "If Lü Boshe goes home and sees his family members all dead, do you think he will let us off? If he brings soldiers to pursue us, we will be in deep trouble." Chen Gong says: "It is a grave sin to kill someone with the intention of doing so." Cao Cao remarks: "I'd rather do wrong to the world than allow the world to do wrong to me." (寧教我負天下人，休教天下人負我) Chen Gong does not respond and he leaves Cao Cao that night.

== Analysis ==
Luo Guanzhong, who wrote the 14th-century historical novel Romance of the Three Kingdoms, distorted the exact words Cao Cao said after he killed Lü Boshe's family. The most significant change is the replacing of "others" (人; literally "people") with "world" (天下人; literally "people under Heaven"). Yi Zhongtian, a Xiamen University history professor, speculated that Cao Cao was probably trying to console himself after mistakenly killing Lü Boshe's family by speaking in a regretful tone ("heartrendingly remarked"). Yi believed that Luo Guanzhong had deliberately changed the words in the quote to reflect that Cao Cao had no sense of remorse because "world" (people in a general sense) carries greater weight than "others" (people in a specific sense), so as to enhance Cao's image as a villain in his novel.

== See also ==
- Lists of people of the Three Kingdoms

== Bibliography ==
- Chen, Shou (3rd century). Records of the Three Kingdoms (Sanguozhi).
- Luo, Guanzhong (14th century). Romance of the Three Kingdoms (Sanguo Yanyi).
- Pei, Songzhi (5th century). Annotated Records of the Three Kingdoms (Sanguozhi zhu).
- Yi, Zhongtian (2006). Huang, Tingting (ed.). 品三國 [Pin San Guo] (in Chinese). Hong Kong: Joint Publishing (H.K.) Co., Ltd. ISBN 978-962-04-2609-4.
