= Yin Mo =

3rd century scholar and official of Shu Han state

- 尹默

Palace Counsellor (太中大夫)
- In office 234 – ?
- Monarch: Liu Shan

Army Libationer (軍祭酒)
- In office 227 – 234
- Monarch: Liu Shan
- Chancellor: Zhuge Liang

Counsellor Remonstrant (諫議大夫)
- In office 223 – 227
- Monarch: Liu Shan
- Chancellor: Zhuge Liang

Crown Prince's Coachman (太子僕)
- In office 221 – 223
- Monarch: Liu Shan
- Chancellor: Zhuge Liang

Personal details
- Born: Unknown Mianyang, Sichuan
- Died: Unknown
- Children: Yin Zong
- Occupation: Official, scholar
- Courtesy name: Siqian (思潛)

Yin Mo (fl. 200s–234), courtesy name Siqian, was a Confucian scholar and official of the state of Shu Han in the Three Kingdoms period of China.

== Life ==
Yin Mo was from Fu County (涪縣), Zitong Commandery (梓潼郡), which is located east of present-day Mianyang, Sichuan. At the time, many people in Yi Province (covering present-day Sichuan and Chongqing) preferred contemporary writing over ancient prose, which they were very unfamiliar with. Yin Mo travelled east to Jing Province (covering present-day Hubei and Hunan) with Li Ren, who was from the same hometown as him, to learn ancient prose from Sima Hui and Song Zhong (宋忠; also known as Song Zhongzi 宋仲子). He became well versed in Confucian classics and history and specialised in the Zuo Zhuan. He followed in the footsteps of earlier scholars such as Liu Xin, who used the Zuo Zhuan to explain the Spring and Autumn Annals, and Zheng Zhong (鄭眾) and Jia Kui, who annotated the Zuo Zhuan. Yin Mo's works became so popular that readers did not need to refer to the original version after reading his annotated works.

In 214, after the warlord Liu Bei seized control of Yi Province from its governor Liu Zhang, he appointed Yin Mo as an Assistant Officer of Education (勸學從事). In late 220, Cao Pi ended the Eastern Han dynasty and established Cao Wei; Yin Mo, together with other Assistant Officers of Education (such as Zhang Shuang and Qiao Zhou), became part of a group of petitioners who persuaded Liu Bei to take the imperial title. .The following year, Liu Bei declared himself emperor and founded the state of Shu Han, after which he designated his son Liu Shan as the Crown Prince. Yin Mo, who was appointed as the Crown Prince's Coachman (太子僕), tutored Liu Shan in the Zuo Zhuan and Confucian classics. Liu Bei died in 223 and was succeeded by Liu Shan, who appointed Yin Mo as a Counsellor Remonstrant (諫議大夫) in the Shu imperial court. Around 227, when the Shu chancellor-regent Zhuge Liang garrisoned military forces in Hanzhong in preparation for a series of campaigns against Shu's rival state Cao Wei, Yin Mo was appointed as an Army Libationer (軍祭酒) under Zhuge Liang. In 234, after Zhuge Liang's death, Yin Mo returned to the Shu capital Chengdu and held the position of a Palace Counsellor (太中大夫). He died on an unspecified date. His son, Yin Zong (尹宗), inherited his legacy and became an Academician (博士) in the Shu court.

== Appraisal ==
Chen Shou, who wrote Yin Mo's biography in the Sanguozhi, commented on Yin Mo as follows: "Yin Mo was versed in the Zuo Zhuan. Even though he did not have a reputation for being virtuous, he was still a scholar of his time."

== See also ==
- Lists of people of the Three Kingdoms
