= Pang Tong Shrine and Tomb =

Coordinates: 31°17′24.3″N 104°28′6.2″E

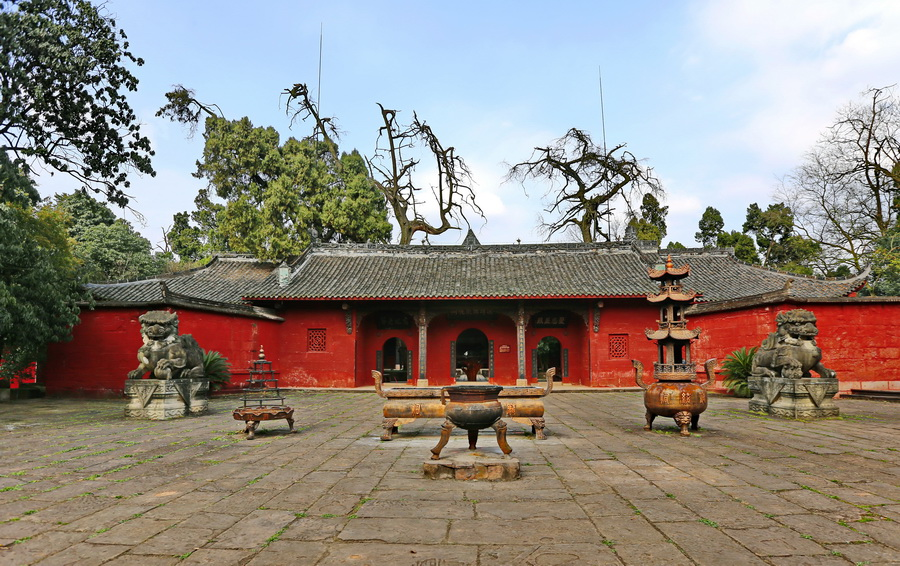
- Entrance to the shrine
- Traditional Chinese: 龐統祠墓
- Simplified Chinese: 庞统祠墓
Transcriptions
Standard Mandarin
- Hanyu Pinyin: Páng Tǒng Cí Mù

Dragon and Phoenix Shrine
- Traditional Chinese: 龍鳳祠
- Simplified Chinese: 龙凤祠
Transcriptions
Standard Mandarin
- Hanyu Pinyin: Lóng Fèng Cí

Valley of the Fallen Phoenix
- Traditional Chinese: 落鳳坡
- Simplified Chinese: 落凤坡
Transcriptions
Standard Mandarin
- Hanyu Pinyin: Luò Fèng Pō

The Pang Tong Shrine and Tomb, also known as the Dragon and Phoenix Shrine and the Valley of the Fallen Phoenix, is a shrine and tomb located in Baimaguan Town (白馬關鎮), Luojiang County, Deyang City, Sichuan Province, China. The shrine and tomb was constructed for Pang Tong (179–214), an adviser to Liu Bei, the founding emperor of the state of Shu Han in the Three Kingdoms period. On 25 May 2006, the shrine and tomb became part of the sixth batch of Major Historical and Cultural Sites Protected at the National Level.

== Background ==
Pang Tong was from Xiangyang Commandery (襄陽郡; present-day Xiangyang, Hubei). He initially served as a minor official in Nan Commandery (around present-day Jingzhou, Hubei) before becoming an adviser to the warlord Liu Bei in 209. In the early 210s, he accompanied Liu Bei on a campaign to seize control of Yi Province (covering present-day Sichuan and Chongqing) from the warlord Liu Zhang. He was killed by a stray arrow in a battle at Luo County (雒縣; north of present-day Guanghan, Sichuan) in 214.

Pang Tong's death is dramatised in the 14th-century historical novel Romance of the Three Kingdoms. In the novel, Zhang Ren, a military officer serving under Liu Zhang, sets up an ambush outside Luo County. Liu Bei offers his horse, Dilu, to Pang Tong out of kindness before the battle. Pang Tong leads a group of soldiers to attack Luo County and passes through the ambush area. Zhang Ren recognises Dilu and mistakes its rider for Liu Bei, so he orders his archers to fire arrows at the rider. Pang Tong is hit by several arrows and dies on the spot. His place of death is called "Valley of the Fallen Phoenix".

== History of the tomb and shrine ==
The tomb and shrine was constructed by Liu Bei in 214 after Pang Tong's death. It is also called "Baima Temple" (白馬寺; literally "White Horse Temple") because it is located in Baimaguan Town (白馬關鎮; literally "White Horse Gate Town"). It is also known as "Dragon and Phoenix Shrine" because there are statues of Pang Tong and Zhuge Liang inside. Pang Tong and Zhuge Liang were nicknamed "Young Phoenix" and "Sleeping Dragon" respectively and they served as Liu Bei's advisers.

The shrine and tomb was damaged over time but was restored in 1691 during the reign of the Kangxi Emperor in the Qing dynasty. As of today, the shrine has a large gate, a main hall, two side halls and a pavilion, with the tomb situated beside it. There are two large cupressaceae trees inside the shrine which are said to have been planted by Zhang Fei, a general serving under Liu Bei. A couplet pasted on the doors reads, "Even though it was obvious that the Late Emperor (Liu Bei) favoured the Fallen Phoenix (Pang Tong), the Sleeping Dragon (Zhuge Liang) was still given the opportunity to be the long-serving minister." Pang Tong's biography, written by Chen Shou in the third century, is carved on a stone wall behind the main hall.

On 25 May 2006, the shrine and tomb became part of the sixth batch of Major Historical and Cultural Sites Protected at the National Level.
