= Chan Mou =

Chinese comic artist from Hong Kong

Chan Mou 陳某
- Born: March 1, 1970 (age 56) British Hong Kong

Chan Mou (Chinese: 陳某; lit. 'Mister Chan') is a Hong Kong comic artist. His first comic ever self-written and self-produced Unhuman (《不是人》), based on the Three Kingdoms period and released in 1996, had won him numerous awards and recognitions.

His pen name Chan Mou (meaning Mister Chan). The last name "Chan" is a common one, which not only to portrays his modesty, but also allows him to be set apart from the mainstream authors. Before his manhua career, he was a graphic designer in the commercial advertising industry.

In the first volume of The Ravages of Time, he described his lack of interest in the current mainstream comic book market. However his own passion toward their action and pictures had motivated him to create his own comic.

As a child, Chan was into sci-fi, cartoons, and Ultraman. He majored in visual arts at university. After his graduation, he got a job working as a graphic designer in the advertising field. He had experience with print ads in TV and newspaper and been involved with the top management.

Unsatisfied with simply assigning jobs, he was eventually aroused him to create his first independent work, Unhuman, and entered it into a few competitions.

Most of his works are related to history, mixed with fables and fairy tales. A reporter once asked Chan about history versus fable, he answered that the true history does not exist. He believes that history is artificial, written by whoever conquers the country. As such, gathering all the fables and novels with history books could even possibly exceed the credibility of history books.

== Major works ==
- Unhuman (不是人)
- God Pretender (充神榜)
- The Ravages of Time (火鳳燎原)
