= Pang Tong =

Advisor to Chinese warlord Liu Bei (179-214)

- 龐統
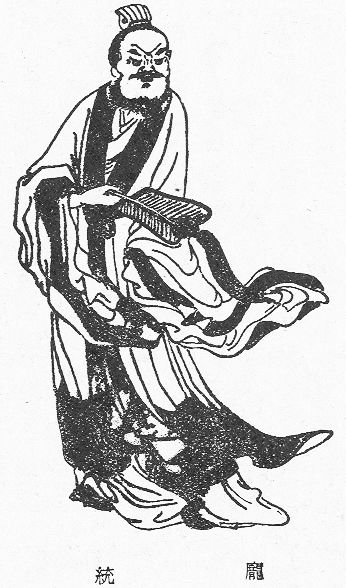
- A Qing dynasty illustration of Pang Tong

Military Adviser General of the Household (軍師中郎將) (under Liu Bei)
- In office ? – 214 Serving with Zhuge Liang
- Monarch: Emperor Xian of Han

Assistant Officer in the Headquarters Office (治中從事) (under Liu Bei)
- In office 210 – ?
- Monarch: Emperor Xian of Han

Assistant Officer (從事) (under Liu Bei)
- In office 210
- Monarch: Emperor Xian of Han

Officer of Merit (功曹) (under Sun Quan)
- In office 209 – 210
- Monarch: Emperor Xian of Han

Personal details
- Born: 179 (Note: Pang Tong's biography in the Sanguozhi recorded that he died at the age of 36 (by East Asian age reckoning) during the siege of Luo County that lasted for near a year from summer 213 to 214. (Note: (為流矢所中，卒，時年三十六。) Sanguozhi vol. 37.) However, in the 11th-century chronological historical text Zizhi Tongjian, Sima Guang stated that Pang Tong died in the year 214. By calculation, his year of birth should be around 179.) Xiangyang, Hubei
- Died: 214 (aged 35) Guanghan, Sichuan
- Resting place: Pang Tong Shrine and Tomb
- Children: Pang Hong
- Relatives: Pang Lin (brother); Pang Degong (uncle); Pang Shanmin (cousin); Pang Huan (nephew)
- Occupation: Politician
- Courtesy name: Shiyuan (士元)
- Posthumous name: Marquess Jing (靖侯)
- Nickname: "Fledgling Phoenix" (鳳雛)
- Peerage: Marquess Jingxi (靖西侯)

Pang Tong (179–214), courtesy name Shiyuan, was a Chinese politician who served as a key adviser to the warlord Liu Bei in the late Eastern Han dynasty of China. In his youth, Pang Tong was disregarded because he was plain-looking. The hermit scholar Sima Hui, however, held him in high esteem and called him the "Crown of Scholars in Jing Province". Pang Tong studied under Sima Hui along with Zhuge Liang, Xu Shu and Xiang Lang, (Note: The Xiangyang Ji recorded that in his youth, Xiang Lang was a student of Sima Hui, and was close and friendly with Xu Shu, Han Song and Pang Tong. (Note: (《襄阳记》曰：朗少师事司马德操，与徐元直、韩德高、庞士元皆亲善。) Xiangyang Ji annotation in Sanguozhi, vol. 41.)) and he was given the nickname "Fledgling Phoenix". Owing to his friendly attitude, he worked as an appraiser in Nan Commandery. When he reviewed someone, he would prioritise their virtues over their abilities and encourage them to help others.

Pang Tong briefly served under Zhou Yu and befriended Lu Ji, Gu Shao and Quan Cong before joining Liu Bei after Liu Bei became the governor of Jing Province in 210. Through the recommendation of Lu Su and Zhuge Liang, Pang Tong was appointed by Liu Bei as an Assistant Officer and subsequently promoted to Military Adviser General of the Household. Pang Tong advised Liu Bei to take over Yi Province (covering present-day Sichuan and Chongqing) and accompanied him on his campaign against the warlord Liu Zhang, but was killed by a stray arrow during a battle at Luo County (north of present-day Guanghan, Sichuan) in 214.

== Early life ==
Pang Tong was from Xiangyang Commandery, Jing Province. In his youth, he looked plain and simple, so aside from his uncle, Pang Degong (龐德公) (Note: He is likely not the same person as the hermit Pang Gong (龐公), who has a biography in vol.83 of Houhanshu; Li Xian may have mistakenly conflated the two men when he annotated the Houhanshu.) who valued him, he was not highly regarded by others. When he reached adulthood (around 19 years old), he visited the hermit scholar Sima Hui, who was famous for spotting and recommending men of talent. They came to a mulberry tree, where Sima Hui climbed up to get the fruit while Pang Tong sat below, and they chatted for a whole day until nightfall. Sima Hui felt that Pang Tong was an extraordinary person and called Pang the "Crown of Scholars in Jing Province" (南州士之冠冕). Furthermore, he remarked, "Pang Degong really knows how to judge people. This is truly a boy of majestic moral character." (Note: (統，德公從子也，少未有識者，惟德公重之，年十八，使往見德操。德操與語，既而歎曰：「德公誠知人，此實盛德也。」) Xiangyang Ji annotation in Sanguozhi vol. 37.) Subsequently, Pang Tong started gaining more recognition among the scholar-gentry. (Note: (...襄陽人也。少時樸鈍，未有識者。潁川司馬徽清雅有知人鑒，統弱冠往見徽，徽採桑於樹上，坐統在樹下，共語自晝至夜。徽甚異之，稱統當為南州士之冠冕，由是漸顯。) Sanguozhi, vol. 37. This record was also used as an annotation in vol.02 of Shishuo Xinyu.) Like Zhuge Liang and Sima Hui who were respectively nicknamed “Crouching Dragon” and “Water Mirror”, Pang Tong was nicknamed "Fledgling Phoenix" (鳳雛; also translated as "Young Phoenix") by his uncle Pang Degong (龐德公). (Note: (襄陽記曰：諸葛孔明為卧龍，龐士元為鳳雛，司馬德操為水鏡，皆龐德公語也。) Xiangyang Ji annotation in Sanguozhi, vol. 37.)

== Service as appraiser ==
Pang Tong later served as an Officer of Merit (功曹) in Nan Commandery (南郡; around present-day Jiangling County, Hubei). By nature, Pang Tong was sociable with people and diligent in fostering and mentoring others. Hence, he was nominated to be an appraiser. When he reviewed people, he focused more on their personal virtues rather than their abilities. He was fond of ethical lessons and consistently strove to maintain high moral standards. He usually overpraised when he was asked to assess a person. (Note: (性好人倫，勤於長養。每所稱述，多過其才，) Sanguozhi vol. 37.)

At times, people were puzzled so they questioned him on why he did that, to which he replied:

“The Tianxia is currently in disorder and customs and principles often forgotten. Good people are overwhelmed by the evil. I desire to change social norms and revive good customs by encouraging good people and giving them a better (exaggerated) reputation, so they can be admired by the many and served as role models for others. Let's say I give exaggerated praises for ten but I'm wrong for five of them however I still have gotten half of them then those can act as lofty examples to teach those of our time and cause the ambitious to act fairly, is this not acceptable?” (Note: (時人怪而問之，統答曰：「當今天下大亂，雅道陵遲，善人少而惡人多。方欲興風俗，長道業，不美其譚即聲名不足慕企，不足慕企而為善者少矣。今拔十失五，猶得其半，而可以崇邁世教，使有志者自勵，不亦可乎？」) Sanguozhi vol. 37.)

== Service under Zhou Yu ==
In 209, Zhou Yu, a general under the warlord Sun Quan, occupied Nan Commandery after the Battle of Jiangling. After Zhou Yu was appointed as the Administrator (太守) of Nan Commandery, Pang Tong served as an Officer of Merit (功曹) under him. When Zhou Yu died in 210, Pang Tong escorted his coffin back to Jiangdong and attended his funeral. Many of the officials in Jiangdong heard of his reputation. When he returned to Jing province, they all accompanied him as he left the city. Among them, Pang Tong met and befriended Lu Ji, Gu Shao and Quan Cong. He also appraised each of them separately and described Lu Ji as "a horse that cannot run fast but has strong willpower", and Gu Shao as "an ox that is physically weak but capable of bearing burdens over great distances". (Note: (吳將周瑜助先主取荊州，因領南郡太守。瑜卒，統送喪至吳，吳人多聞其名。及當西還，並會昌門，陸勣、顧劭、全琮皆往。統曰：「陸子可謂駑馬有逸足之力，顧子可謂駑牛能負重致遠也。」) Sanguozhi vol. 37.) He also compared Quan Cong to Fan Zizhao (樊子昭) of Runan describing him as someone generous who admire respectable men. (Note: (謂全琮曰：「卿好施慕名，有似汝南樊子昭。雖智力不多，亦一時之佳也。」) Sanguozhi vol. 37.) (Note: In his Wanji Lun (万机论), Jiang Ji supposedly criticized Xu Shao for his biased appraisal, by elevating Fan Zizhao and demeaning Xu Jing; Liu Ye had a discussion with Jiang over the topic. (Note: (蒋济《万机论》云许子将褒贬不平，以拔樊子昭而抑许文休。刘晔曰：“子昭拔自贾竖，年至耳顺，退能守静，进能不苟。”济答曰：“子昭诚自长幼完洁，然观其臿齿牙，树颊胲，吐唇吻，自非文休敌也。) Pei Songzhi's annotation in Sanguozhi, vol.37))

Someone then asked Pang Tong: "Does that mean Lu Ji is better than Gu Shao?" Pang Tong replied: "Although a horse can run fast, it can only bear the weight of one person. An ox can travel 300 li a day; it can certainly bear more than just the weight of one person!" Gu Shao later asked Pang Tong: "You are also known for being a good judge of character. Between us, who do you think is the better one?" Pang Tong replied: "I am not as good as you in associating with people and assessing their characters. However, when it comes to politics and strategy, it seems that I am one day ahead of you." Gu Shao agreed with Pang Tong and developed a closer bond with him. (Note: (張勃吳錄曰：或問統曰：「如所目，陸子為勝乎？」統曰：「駑馬雖精，所致一人耳。駑牛一日行三百里，所致豈一人之重哉！」劭就統宿，語，因問：「卿名知人，吾與卿孰愈？」統曰：「陶冶世俗，甄綜人物，吾不及卿；論帝王之秘策，攬倚伏之要最，吾似有一日之長。」劭安其言而親之。) Wu Lu annotation in Sanguozhi vol. 37.) Before Pang Tong left, Lu Ji and Gu Shao told him: "When peace is restored in the Empire, we want to have a good discussion with you about famous people." Both of them became close friends with Pang Tong. (Note: (績、劭謂統曰：「使天下太平，當與卿共料四海之士。」深與統相結而還。) Sanguozhi vol. 37.)

== Serving Liu Bei in Jing Province ==
Pang Tong became a subject of Liu Bei after the latter became the Governor of Jingzhou in 210. He initially served as an Assistant Officer (從事) and as the county magistrate (縣令) of Leiyang, but was later dismissed from office due to poor performance. Sun Quan's general Lu Su wrote to Liu Bei, recommending Pang Tong as a great talent that should be employed to important tasks and not managing a small territory. Liu Bei's strategist Zhuge Liang also recommended Pang Tong, so Liu Bei met with him, was greatly impressed and entrusted him with important matters. He recruited Pang to be an Assistant Officer in the Headquarters Office (治中從事). Liu Bei's treatment towards Pang Tong was second to that of Zhuge Liang. He later appointed both Pang Tong and Zhuge Liang as Military Adviser Generals of the Household (軍師中郎將). (Note: (先主領荊州，統以從事守耒陽令，在縣不治，免官。吳將魯肅遺先主書曰：「龐士元非百里才也，使處治中、別駕之任，始當展其驥足耳。」諸葛亮亦言之於先主，先主見與善譚，大器之，以為治中從事。親待亞於諸葛亮，遂與亮並為軍師中郎將。) Sanguozhi vol. 37.)

While making merry during a feast, Liu Bei asked Pang Tong: "You once worked as Zhou Gongjin’s Officer of Merit. Before when I went to Wu, I heard that he secretly pressed Zhongmou to detain me. Is it true? When a man is with his lord, he must be utterly honest with him." Pang Tong admitted that it was true. Liu Bei then sighed and said: "At this moment, I was in danger and they rescued me hence I could not refuse their invitation and almost failed to escape Zhou Yu's grasp! In this world, men of talent and wisdom can see through each other's plan. Before I left, Kongming protested against this with all his will. He has seen through this. However, I didn't listen because I was thinking that I was Zhongmou's defense against the north and that he would need my help. I had no doubts about him. This was truly entering into the tiger's den and a very risky plan." (Note: (江表傳曰：先主與統從容宴語，問曰：「卿為周公瑾功曹，孤到吳，聞此人密有白事，勸仲謀相留，有之乎？在君為君，卿其無隱。」統對曰：「有之。」備歎息曰：「孤時危急，當有所求，故不得不往，殆不免周瑜之手！天下智謀之士，所見略同耳。時孔明諫孤莫行，其意獨篤，亦慮此也。孤以仲謀所防在北，當賴孤為援，故決意不疑。此誠出於險塗，非萬全之計也。」) Jiang Biao Zhuan annotation in Sanguozhi vol. 37.)

== Assisting Liu Bei in the conquest of Yi Province ==
Around 210s, Pang Tong convinced Liu Bei to seize Yi Province (covering present-day Sichuan and Chongqing) and use its resources to compete with his rival Cao Cao for supremacy over China. Pang Tong said :

“Jing Province is in ruins and ravaged by constant conflicts. His people are exhausted with Sun Quan to the east and Cao Cao to the north looming over them therefore the tripartite balance will be difficult to achieve. Now Yi Province is wealthy and his people are strong, his population in the million along with many troops and horses present in all the region; all of this can be obtained and from then on would serve as the foundation for the future. Now, you can seize it and accomplish your great entreprise." (Note: (九州春秋曰：統說備曰：「荊州荒殘，人物殫盡，東有吳孫，北有曹氏，鼎足之計，難以得志。今益州國富民彊，戶口百萬，四部兵馬，所出必具，寶貨無求於外，今可權借以定大事。」) Jiuzhou Chunqiu annotation in Sanguozhi vol. 37.)

Liu Bei answered :

“At this moment, my rival is Cao Cao. Both of us are opposite as water and fire. He is suspicious while I'm lenient. He is cruel while I'm kind. He is deceitful while I'm loyal. If I am always acting in opposition against him in that way then our plan may be accomplish. Now for a small reason, I would lose the faith and trust of all the people under the sky. Therefore, I won't do it.” (Note: (備曰：「今指與吾為水火者，曹操也，操以急，吾以寬；操以暴，吾以仁；操以譎，吾以忠；每與操反，事乃可成耳。今以小故而失信義於天下者，吾所不取也。」) Jiuzhou Chunqiu annotation in Sanguozhi vol. 37.)

Pang Tong replied :

“This is a period of perpetual changement where one must shown himself flexible and cannot be settled by a single principle. Subduing the weak while attacking secretly was the way of the Five Hegemons. Ending the rebellion while defending the loyal, treating them with respect and honesty while rewarding them fairly after the conflict end. How is that turning back on righteousness? Be careful that if you don't take it today, it ends in someone else's lap.”

Liu Bei heeded Pang Tong's suggestion. (Note: (統曰：「權變之時，固非一道所能定也。兼弱攻昧，五伯之事。逆取順守，報之以義，事定之後，封以大國，何負於信？今日不取，終為人利耳。」備遂行。) Jiuzhou Chunqiu annotation in Sanguozhi vol. 37.)

In 211, Liu Bei led an army from Jing Province into Yi Province on the pretext of helping Yi Province's governor, Liu Zhang, counter an invasion from the warlord Zhang Lu in Hanzhong Commandery. Zhuge Liang remained behind to guard Jing Province while Pang Tong followed Liu Bei to Yi Province. (Note: (亮留鎮荊州。統隨從入蜀。) Sanguozhi vol. 37.) Liu Zhang received Liu Bei at Fu County (涪縣; present-day Mianyang, Sichuan). Pang Tong urged Liu Bei to use the opportunity to capture Liu Zhang and force him to hand over Yi Province, but Liu Bei refused because he was new to Yi Province and had not established a strong foundation there yet. Liu Zhang later returned to Yi Province's capital, Chengdu. (Note: (益州牧劉璋與先主會涪，統進策曰：「今因此會，便可執之，則將軍無用兵之勞，而坐定一州也。」先主曰：「初入他國，恩信未著，此不可也。」璋旣還成都，先主當為璋北征漢中，...) Sanguozhi vol. 37.)

=== Advising Liu Bei against Liu Zhang ===
Pang Tong outlined three plans for Liu Bei to choose from:

- The upper plan: Select the best soldiers to form an elite force and advance quickly towards Chengdu, and force Liu Zhang to surrender and hand over Yi Province. Pang Tong also believed that Liu Zhang was not competent in military affairs and was unprepared, so the chances of success were high. Pang Tong considered this to be the best plan.
- The middle plan: Yang Huai (楊懷) and Gao Pei (高沛) were famous generals who led strong troops defending Baishui Pass (白水關), and that in the past they had advised Liu Zhang to send Liu Bei back to Jing Province. Before advancing, spread false news that Liu Bei was returning to Jing Province by claiming that the region was in danger and needed rescue. With Liu Bei's reputation and wanting to see him leave, Yang and Gao would certainly come see him off with light cavalry, away from the fortified mountain passes they were defending. Then seize the opportunity to kill them and take control of their positions and troops, and finally advance towards Chengdu.
- The lower plan: Retreat to Baidicheng and wait for another opportunity to attack. Pang Tong considered this to be the worst plan.

Pang Tong told Liu Bei that if he took too much time and didn't go then he would be in great danger and couldn't last. (Note: (璋既還成都，先主當為璋北征漢中，統復說曰：「陰選精兵，晝夜兼道，徑襲成都；璋既不武，又素無預備，大軍卒至，一舉便定，此上計也。楊懷、高沛，璋之名將，各仗彊兵，據守關頭，聞數有牋諫璋，使發遣將軍還荊州。將軍未至，遣與相聞，說荊州有急，欲還救之，並使裝束，外作歸形；此二子既服將軍英名，又喜將軍之去，計必乘輕騎來見，將軍因此執之，進取其兵，乃向成都，此中計也。退還白帝，連引荊州，徐還圖之，此下計也。若沈吟不去，將致大因，不可久矣。」) Sanguozhi vol. 37.) Liu Bei chose the middle plan and executed it – he killed Yang Huai and Gao Pei, led his forces towards Chengdu and conquered several of Liu Zhang's territories along the way. (Note: (先主然其中計，即斬懷、沛，還向成都，所過輒克) Sanguozhi vol. 37.)

=== Disagreement over Liu Bei's behavior during the campaign ===
When Liu Bei expressed joy during a banquet in Fu County to celebrate his success saying that today should be a merry day, Pang Tong chided him, saying that "celebrating the invasion of others' territory isn't what a man of ren (benevolence) should do". The drunk Liu Bei retorted angrily, "King Wu of Zhou also rejoiced after his victory over Di Xin. Is he not an example of a man of ren? You're wrong, so get out now!" (Note: (先主然其中計，即斬懷、沛，還向成都，所過輒克。於涪大會，置酒作樂，謂統曰：「今日之會，可謂樂矣。」統曰：「伐人之國而以為歡，非仁者之兵也。」先主醉，怒曰：「武王伐紂，前歌後舞，非仁者邪？卿言不當，宜速起出！」於是統逡巡引退。) Sanguozhi vol. 37.) After Pang Tong left, Liu Bei regretted what he said so he invited Pang back. Pang Tong returned to his seat and did not say anything, acting as usual, so Liu Bei asked, "When that quarrel happened just now, whose fault do you think it was?" Pang Tong replied, "It was both yours and mine." Liu Bei laughed and the banquet continued. (Note: (先主尋悔，請還。統復故位，初不顧謝，飲食自若。先主謂曰：「向者之論，阿誰為失？」統對曰：「君臣俱失。」先主大笑，宴樂如初) Sanguozhi vol. 37.)

Xi Zuochi commented on this event and said :

“When one is acting as a warlord, he must first observe benevolence and righteousness in each of his actions, consider faith and justice as his model; if one of those is not respected than the way isn't the right one. Now Liu Bei attacked and seized the lands of Liu Zhang, using strength to serve his entreprise and turning his back on the faith and trust of others and violating virtue and righteousness in his process. Although by this choice, he prospered. He should have greatly grieved for his defeated enemies. Like breaking a hand to preserve a body, what joy there is to find? Pang Tong feared this conversation would be leaked and that his lord would see he was in the wrong so in front of everyone corrected his error and did not act his usual modest way being rectifying his lord's mistake while being truthful and loyal. A superior who can correct his mistakes will have followers while achieving success. With many followers, one may be able to achieve great entreprise. If he follows reason, he will have his goal realized. With one speech, three goods were illuminated while with one remonstrance hundred of generations followed righteousness, this can be used as an example. If one tries to change his faults while he doesn't focus his attention on his qualities, understand his faults, will itself be honest and loyal, those would be able to complete great entreprise and achieve their affairs, there has never been such before.” (Note: (習鑿齒曰：夫霸王者，必體仁義以為本，仗信順以為宗，一物不具，則其道乖矣。今劉備襲奪璋土，權以濟業，負信違情，德義俱愆，雖功由是隆，宜大傷其敗，譬斷手全軀，何樂之有？龐統懼斯言之泄宣，知其君之必悟，故眾中匡其失，而不脩常謙之道，矯然太當，盡其蹇諤之風。夫上失而能正，是有臣也，納勝而無執，是從理也；有臣則陛隆堂高，從理則群策畢舉；一言而三善兼明，暫諫而義彰百代，可謂達乎大體矣。若惜其小失而廢其大益，矜此過言，自絕遠讜，能成業濟務者，未之有也。) Xi Zuochi's annotation in Sanguozhi vol. 37.)

Pei Songzhi added :

“Although the plan to attack Liu Zhang came from Pang Tong, it violated righteousness to accomplish the desired goal and so was at his root deceptive knowing this Pang Tong felt guilty and restrained himself from happy feelings. Hence when he heard Liu Bei speak about being merry he acted unconsciously frank and answered as such. Liu Bei at this feast drank too much and was happy at another's misfortune comparing himself to King Wu of Zhou without any shame. This was Liu Bei being at fault while Pang Tong wasn't. His statement that both of them were in the wrong was to avoid conflict. In this discussion though Mister Xi Zuochi's purpose isn't wrong, the implication of those words have digressed.” (Note: (臣松之以為謀襲劉璋，計雖出於統，然違義成功，本由詭道，心既內疚，則歡情自戢，故聞備稱樂之言，不覺率爾而對也。備宴酣失時，事同樂禍，自比武王，曾無愧色，此備有非而統無失，其云「君臣俱失」，蓋分謗之言耳。習氏所論，雖大旨無乖，然推演之辭，近為流宕也。) Pei Songzhi's annotation in Sanguozhi vol. 37.)

== Death ==
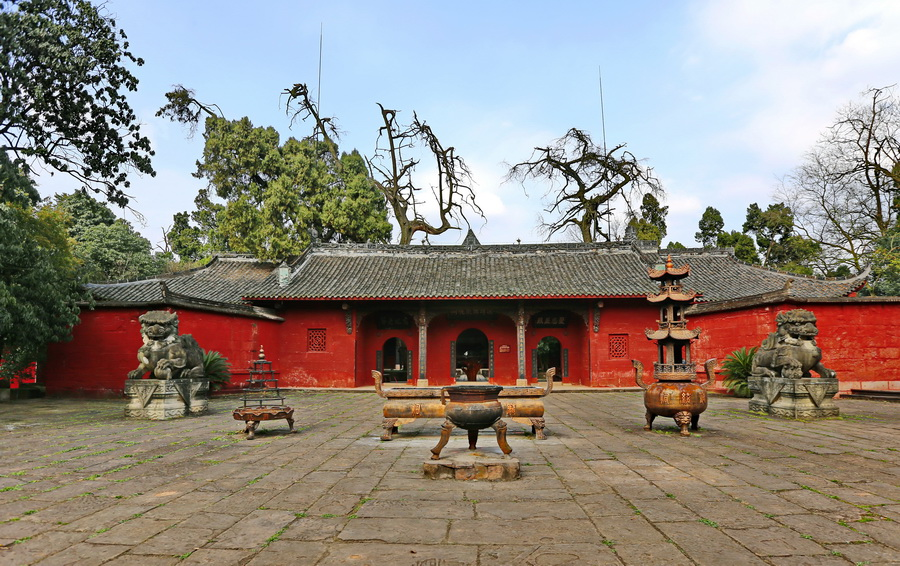
Pang Tong memorial hall and tomb in Luojiang

Pang Tong later participated in a battle against Liu Zhang's forces at Luo County (雒縣; north of present-day Guanghan, Sichuan). He died after being hit by a stray arrow in the midst of battle. He was 36 years old (by East Asian age reckoning) at the time of his death. Liu Bei was deeply saddened by Pang Tong's death and he would weep whenever Pang Tong was mentioned. Pang Tong was posthumously made a Second Class Marquess (關內侯) after Liu Bei became emperor and established the state of Shu Han in 221. (Note: (進圍雒縣，統率衆攻城，為流矢所中，卒，時年三十六。先主痛惜，言則流涕。 ... 追賜統爵關內侯，謚曰靖侯。) Sanguozhi vol. 37.) In October or November 260, Liu Bei's son and successor, Liu Shan, honoured Pang Tong with the posthumous title "Marquess Jing" (靖侯), and bestowed upon his heir the title of Marquess Jingxi (靖西侯). (Note: ([景耀]三年秋九月，追謚故將軍關羽、張飛、馬超、龐統、黃忠。) Sanguozhi vol. 33.)

Liu Bei had a shrine and tomb constructed for Pang Tong near Luo County. The shrine and tomb is located in present-day Baimaguan Town (白馬關鎮), Luojiang County, Sichuan. On 25 May 2006, it became a Major Historical and Cultural Site Protected at the National Level.

=== Tang Geng about Pang Tong's death ===
Tang Geng (唐庚), a scholar from the Song dynasty, in his work called the "Three Kingdoms Miscellaneous Cases" (三國雜事), lamented over the young age at which Pang Tong died, recalling that while Zhuge Liang and Pang Tong were classmates, by the time Zhuge Liang died at a relatively young age of 53, Pang Tong himself was already dead for 20 years. He then commented on the fact that the year 219 when Liu Bei took the title of "King of Hanzhong" was also the year Guan Yu died. (Note: While in the Chinese calendar, Guan Yu died in the 24th year of the Jian'an era, he died in the 12th month of that year, which corresponds to 23 January to 21 February 220 in the Julian calendar.) Next year, in 220 Huang Zhong and Fa Zheng died. Next year, in 221 Zhang Fei died. (Note: Dong He also died that year) Next year, in 222 Ma Chao and Ma Liang died. (Note: Xu Jing and Liu Ba also died that year)

Before the foundation has been complete, each of those heroes were lost, one following the other, as if they were being stolen away. Next year, in 223 when Liu Shan took the imperial throne, among the veterans, only Zhuge Liang and Zhao Yun were left. Seven years later and Zhao Yun was dead in 229, while Zhuge Liang died five years later in 234. At this time, all of those who achieved past glory were gone. Fa Zheng barely reached 44 years old, Ma Chao 46 years old and Ma Liang 34 years old. Zhang Fei was said to be younger than both Liu Bei and Guan Yu; since Guan Yu was several years older than him, he must have been around fifty or so when he died. Huo Jun died when he was just 39 years old.

All of these individuals are born with great talents yet lived a short life; all while Qiao Zhou (Note: Qiao Zhou suffered from a bad reputation because he advocated surrender to Liu Shan in 263 during the Conquest of Shu by Wei.) lived to be more than seventy years old. With this, it was made clear that Heaven no longer favoured the Han.

== Family ==
After Pang Tong's death, Liu Bei appointed Pang's father – whose name was not recorded in history – as a Consultant (議郎) and later promoted him to a Counsellor Remonstrant (諫議大夫). Zhuge Liang treated him with great respect. (Note: (拜統父議郎，遷諫議大夫，諸葛亮親為之拜。) Sanguozhi vol. 37.)

Pang Tong had a younger brother, Pang Lin (龐林). His wife was the sister of Xi Zhen, In 208, they were separated when Cao Cao invaded Jing Province and occupied Xiangyang, and reunited after the Battle of Xiaoting. During more than a decade of separation, she remained faithful to her husband and raised their daughter on her own. The Wei emperor Cao Pi praised her for her virtues and awarded her gifts. (Note: (襄陽記云：[龐]林婦，同郡習禎姉。禎事在楊戲輔臣贊。曹公之破荊州，林婦與林分隔，守養弱女十有餘年，後林隨黃權降魏，始復集聚。魏文帝聞而賢之，賜牀帳衣服，以顯其義節。) Xiangyang Ji annotation in Sanguozhi vol. 37.) He served as an Assistant Officer in Jing Province's Headquarters Office (荊州治中從事). He participated in the Battle of Xiaoting in 221–222 alongside the general Huang Quan and was in charge of defending the northern flank from possible attacks by Shu's rival state, Wei. After Liu Bei lost to Sun Quan's general Lu Xun at the Battle of Xiaoting, Pang Lin and Huang Quan were separated from Liu Bei's remaining forces and could not return to Shu, so they brought along their troops and surrendered to Wei. Pang Lin served as the Administrator (太守) of Julu Commandery (鉅鹿郡) in Wei and received a marquis title. (Note: (統弟林，以荊州治中從事參鎮北將軍黃權征吳，值軍敗，隨權入魏，魏封列侯，至鉅鹿太守。) Sanguozhi vol. 37.)

Pang Tong had a son, Pang Hong (龐宏; fl.214-251), whose courtesy name was Jushi (巨師). Pang Hong, who served in the Shu government, was known for being frugal, upright and outspoken. He offended Chen Zhi (陳袛), the Prefect of the Masters of Writing (尚書令). Chen Zhi found fault with Pang Hong and blocked him from getting promoted. He died in office while serving as the Administrator (太守) of Fuling Commandery (涪陵郡). (Note: (統子宏，字巨師，剛簡有臧否，輕傲尚書令陳袛，為袛所抑，卒於涪陵太守。) Sanguozhi vol. 37.)

The previously mentioned Pang Degong, was also from Xiangyang. He was an acquaintance of Zhuge Liang, who showed him great respect by always bowing deeply before him when he visited his house. One day, when Pang Degong was away to pay his respects at his ancestor's tomb across the Mian River, Sima Hui visited his house and instructed his family to prepare a meal, telling them that "Xu Shu said that an important guest is coming to meet him and Pang Degong." Pang Degong's family respectfully followed Sima Hui's instructions. When Pang Degong returned, he did not seem surprised by Sima Hui's visit and behaved normally; it was as though he saw Sima Hui as a regular member of his household. Sima Hui, being ten years younger than Pang Degong, treated the latter as an older brother and called him affectionately "Lord Pang" (龐公) – to the point where people thought that "Lord Pang" was Pang Degong's name. (Note: (德公，襄陽人。孔明每至其家，獨拜床下，德公初不令止。德操嘗造德公，值其渡沔，上祀先人墓，德操徑入其室，呼德公妻子，使速作黍，「徐元直向云有客當來就我與龐公譚。」其妻子皆羅列拜於堂下，奔走供設。須臾，德公還，直入相就，不知何者是客也。德操年小德公十歲，兄事之，呼作龐公，故世人遂謂龐公是德公名，非也。) Xiangyang Ji annotation in Sanguozhi vol. 37.)

Pang Degong's son, Pang Shanmin (龐山民) (Note: When annotating the Book of the Later Han, Li Xian recorded Pang's courtesy name as "Shanren" (山人) to avoid the naming taboo of his grandfather Emperor Taizong of Tang (Li Shimin); see annotations for vol.83 of Houhanshu.) also enjoyed a good reputation and married the younger one of Zhuge Liang's elder sisters. He later served as a Gentleman of the Yellow Gate (黃門吏) but died at a young age. His son, Pang Huan (龐渙), whose courtesy name was Shiwen (世文), served as the Administrator of Zangke Commandery (牂牁太守) during the reign of Emperor Wu of the Jin dynasty between 280 and 289. (Note: (德公子山民，亦有令名，娶諸葛孔明小姊，為魏黃門吏部郎，早卒。子渙，字世文，晉太康中為牂牁太守。) Xiangyang Ji annotation in Sanguozhi vol. 37.)

== Appraisal ==
Chen Shou, who wrote Pang Tong's biography in the Sanguozhi, appraised Pang as follows: "Pang Tong was good when associating with others. He diligently studied the classics, from this pondered his planning. During his time, people from Jing and Chu thought he was an exceptional talent. In comparison with officials from (Cao) Wei, Pang Tong would be similar to Xun Yu like a brother while Fa Zheng would be of the same nefarious kind as Cheng and Guo. (Note: (評曰：龐統雅好人流，經學思謀，于時荊﹑楚謂之高俊．...儗之魏臣，統其荀彧之仲叔，正其程﹑郭之儔儷邪？) Sanguozhi vol. 37.)

Yang Xi, who wrote the Ji Han Fuchen Zan (季漢輔臣贊; pub. 241), a collection of praises of notable persons who served in the Shu Han state, appraised him as follows: "Military Adviser General of the Household (軍師中郎將; Pang Tong) showed brightly, both extreme elegance and virtue. He devoted his life to clear his Master's path, loyal to his feelings and always delivered his opinion. But for all those righteousness actions, in response to virtue he received death." (Note: (軍師美至，雅氣曄曄。致命明主，忠情發臆。惟此義宗，亡身報德。〈贊龐士元〉) Sanguozhi vol. 45.)

== In Romance of the Three Kingdoms ==
Pang Tong appears as a character in the 14th-century historical novel Romance of the Three Kingdoms, which romanticises the historical events before and during the Three Kingdoms period. In the novel, Pang Tong is portrayed as a brilliant military strategist who equals Zhuge Liang. Sima Hui recommends Pang Tong and Zhuge Liang as talents to aid Liu Bei by saying, "Hidden Dragon and Young Phoenix. If you can get either of them, you'll be able to pacify the empire."

In Chapter 47, before the Battle of Red Cliffs, Jiang Gan recommends Pang Tong to Cao Cao. Pang Tong presents a "chain links strategy" (連環計) to Cao. The plan involves linking Cao Cao's battleships together with strong iron chains to make the ships more stable when they were sailing, as well as to reduce the chances of Cao's soldiers falling seasick due to excessive rocking. This leads to Cao Cao's defeat as his battleships are unable to separate from each other during the fire attack, and when one ship is set aflame, the other ships linked to it catch fire as well.

In Chapter 57, Pang Tong's tenure as county magistrate of Leiyang was dramatized. (Note: When dramatizing Pang Tong's tenure as the county magistrate of Leiyang, Romance described Pang as being drunk frequently; this may be based off Jiang Wan during his tenure as Chief of Guangdu County. In the novel, Zhuge Liang praised Pang Tong's talents as being far greater than that required to govern an area of just 100 li, an assessment he historically gave to Jiang Wan; compare chapter 57 of Sanguo Yanyi and vol.44 of Sanguozhi.)

Pang Tong's death during the war between Liu Bei and Liu Zhang is highly dramatised in Chapter 63. At the outset of the battle at Luo County, before Liu Bei and Pang Tong split forces for a two-pronged attack, Pang Tong's horse rears and throws him off its back. This is seen as a bad omen. Liu Bei then let Pang Tong borrow his famous steed, Dilu (的盧). However, Dilu is believed to bring bad luck to its rider despite having saved Liu Bei's life earlier. Liu Zhang's general Zhang Ren, who plans an ambush near Luo County, recognises Dilu and mistakes its rider to be Liu Bei, so he orders his archers to fire at the rider. Pang Tong is hit by several arrows which pierce through his body and he dies on the spot. His place of death is called "Valley of the Fallen Phoenix".

== In popular culture ==
Pang Tong is featured as a playable character in Koei's Dynasty Warriors, Warriors Orochi and Dynasty Tactics video game series.

Pang Tong is the sixth of the eight genius students of Master Water Mirror in The Ravages of Time manhua.

In the upcoming video game Wo Long 2: Wings of Ember, Pang Tong plays a central role in the story.

== See also ==
- Lists of people of the Three Kingdoms
