= Jia Kui (scholar) =

- 賈逵

Personal details
- Born: 30 Pingling , Youfufeng Commandery , Eastern Han
- Died: 101 (aged 70–71)
- Occupation: Confucian

Jia Kui
- Traditional Chinese: 賈逵
- Simplified Chinese: 贾逵
Transcriptions
Standard Mandarin
- Hanyu Pinyin: Jiǎ Kuí

Jingbo (courtesy name)
- Chinese: 景伯
Transcriptions
Standard Mandarin
- Hanyu Pinyin: Jǐngbó

Jia Kui (30–101 CE), courtesy name Jingbo, was a Confucian philosopher who lived in the early Eastern Han period. He was a descendant of the Western Han politician and writer Jia Yi. He was born in Pingling (平陵), Youfufeng Commandery (右扶風郡), which is located northeast of present-day Xingping, Shaanxi. He studied at university in Luoyang.

== Zuo Zhuan expert ==
Like his father, Jia Hui, he was an expert in the Zuo Zhuan and the Guoyu, presenting his commentary on these to Emperor Ming in around 67 CE, who added them to the imperial collection. He was a colleague of Ban Gu at the imperial library, and like him, wrote a commentary on Qu Yuan's poem Li Sao.

== Writings ==
Upon Emperor Zhang's ascension to the throne, he ordered Jia to write of the Zuo Zhuan's superiority to both the Guliang Zhuan and the Gongyang Zhuan. Jia produced the work, arguing that only Zuo Zhuan agreed with the supposedly-prophetic chen, proclaiming that the House of Liu (the Han dynastic family) was destined to rule as successors of the legendary Emperor Yao. Impressed by the result, the emperor then commanded Jia to select twenty scholars then studying the Gongyang Zhuan, instruct them in the Zuo Zhuan and compile a new edition and commentary.

Around 82 CE, he completed three more works in which he compared the "New Text" and "Old Text" versions (i.e. those saved from the Qin book burnings by Fu Sheng and those discovered in a wall of Confucius' estate and transcribed by Kong Anguo) of the Book of Documents, Rites of Zhou and the Classic of Poetry.

== Writings and poetry ==
According to Jia's biography in the Book of the Later Han, he wrote over a million words commentary on the Confucian classics, as well as poetry.

Jia was commissioned in 85 CE to produce a report on the fine-tuning of the amended and re-introduced Sifen calendar.

Under Emperor He, he was promoted to General of the Household in 91 CE, and Commandant of the Cavalry in 97 CE. He died in 101 CE, aged 71.
