= Fa Xiong =

Early 2nd century Eastern Han dynasty official

- 法雄

Administrator of Nan Commandery (南郡太守)
- In office ? – c. 110s
- Monarch: Emperor An of Han

Inspector of Qing Province (青州刺史)
- In office 109 – ?
- Monarch: Emperor An of Han

Prefect of Wanling (宛陵令)
- In office ? – 109
- Monarch: Emperor An of Han

Personal details
- Born: Unknown
- Died: between 114 and 120
- Children: Fa Zhen
- Occupation: Politician
- Courtesy name: Wenjiang (文彊)

Fa Xiong (died between 114 and 120), courtesy name Wenjiang, was a Chinese politician who lived in the Eastern Han dynasty and served during the reign of Emperor An. He is best known for suppressing rebellions in present-day eastern Shandong and the Liaodong Peninsula from 109 to 111 and for serving as the Administrator of Nan Commandery (around present-day Jingzhou, Hubei) in the 110s. He was the great-grandfather of Fa Zheng, a chief adviser to the warlord Liu Bei, who founded the state of Shu Han in the Three Kingdoms era.

== Family background ==
Fa Xiong's ancestral home was in Mei County (郿縣), Fufeng Commandery (扶風郡), which is in present-day Mei County, Baoji, Shaanxi. His ancestor was Tian Fazhang, who was formally known as King Xiang of the Qi state in the Warring States period. Tian Fazhang's descendants changed their family name from "Tian" to "Fa" after the fall of Qi in 221 BCE. During the reign of Emperor Xuan in the Western Han dynasty, Tian Fazhang's descendants were relocated to the capital province and granted a hereditary official position with an income of 2,000 dan (石) of grain.

== Early career ==
Fa Xiong started his career as a minor officer in the commandery office and was later recruited to serve in the office of Zhang Yu (張禹), the Grand Tutor (太傅) in the Han imperial court. He was later nominated for promotion and was appointed as the Chief (長) of Pingshi County (平氏縣). During his tenure, he governed the county well, maintained high standards of security in the area, and earned the admiration and respect of his subordinates and the people. Bao De (鮑得), the Administrator (太守) of Nanyang Commandery (南陽郡), reported Fa Xiong's achievements to the imperial court. Fa Xiong was then reassigned to be the Prefect (令) of Wanling County (宛陵縣).

== Suppressing rebellions ==
In 109, during the reign of Emperor An, the pirate Zhang Bolu (張伯路) donned military attire, declared himself 'General' (將軍), and led some 3,000 followers to raid the regions near the coast in present-day eastern Shandong and kill the officials there. The Han imperial court ordered Pang Xiong (龐雄) to lead government forces to attack the pirates. Zhang Bolu surrendered initially, but returned to cause trouble again a year later. This time, he allied with Liu Wenhe (劉文河) from Pingyuan County (平原縣) and Liu's some 300 followers. They called themselves 'Emissaries' (使者). They attacked Yanci County (厭次縣) and killed its officials, and then headed to Gaotang County (高唐縣), where they burnt down official buildings and freed prisoners from their cells. Bandits and outlaws in the area came to join Zhang Bolu, who donned official garments and declared himself 'General'.

The imperial court commissioned Wang Zong (王宗) to mobilise thousands of government troops in You and Ji provinces to counter Zhang Bolu's rebel army. Fa Xiong was appointed as the Inspector (刺史) of Qing Province and was ordered to assist Wang Zong in suppressing the revolt. The Han forces defeated the rebels, killed hundreds of them, captured their equipment and caused the others to disperse. Around the time, Emperor An issued a decree offering amnesty to the remaining rebels, but they were hesitant in surrendering because they saw that the government troops were still active. Wang Zong summoned all the Inspectors and Administrators to discuss his plan to attack the remaining rebels and eliminate them. Fa Xiong said, "No. Military force is a deadly weapon; war is dangerous. We cannot rely solely on courage; victory is not certain. If the rebels head towards the sea and sail to distant islands, it will be much harder to eliminate them. Now that the amnesty decree has arrived, it is better to withdraw our troops, so as to make the rebels feel at ease and put them off guard. They will definitely disperse later, and then we can subdue them without using much force." Wang Zong heeded Fa Xiong's suggestion and withdrew his troops. The rebels were delighted and they surrendered.

However, the government forces in Donglai Commandery (東萊郡) did not withdraw as ordered, so the rebels there became fearful and they escaped to an island near the Liaodong Peninsula. In the spring of 111, the rebels raided Donglai again when they ran out of food supplies. Fa Xiong led Donglai's armed forces to attack the rebels and defeated them, driving them back to Liaodong again. In Liaodong, Li Jiu (李乆) led a militia to assist Fa Xiong's army and they eliminated the remaining rebels. Peace was restored in the area.

== Later career and death ==
Fa Xiong was known for his wisdom in reviewing criminal cases and detecting corruption in his administration. For example, he closely observed a prisoner's facial expression and used that to assess whether the person was guilty or not. He succeeded in separating truth and deception on several occasions. He also caught his subordinates who abused their power and had them dismissed from office.

Fa Xiong served in Qing Province for four years before he was reassigned to be the Administrator of Nan Commandery (南郡; around present-day Jingzhou, Hubei), which covered Yunmeng Lake (雲夢澤) and part of the Han River. When he was in office, he managed criminal cases efficiently and maintained high standards of security. During his tenure, Nan Commandery not only experienced many bountiful harvests, but also saw an increase in its population. During the Yongchu era (107–114) in the reign of Emperor An, there were numerous incidents of people in Nan Commandery being attacked by predatory animals such as tigers and wolves. The previous Administrator had offered rewards to hunters to eliminate this threat, but these hunters ended up being killed by the animals instead. Fa Xiong believed that the animals would not disturb the people as long as they were allowed to roam free in the wild, so he instructed the people to stop hunting animals in the wild and destroy their hunting equipment. He was proven right because the frequency of such attacks decreased significantly after his suggestion was implemented. Fa Xiong died in office during the Yuanchu era (114–120) in the reign of Emperor An.

== See also ==
- Fa Zhen, Fa Xiong's son.
- Fa Zheng, Fa Xiong's great-grandson.
