= Fa Zhen =

Chinese Eastern Han dynasty scholar (100–188)

- Chinese: 法真
Transcriptions
Standard Mandarin
- Hanyu Pinyin: Fǎ Zhēn
- Wade–Giles: Fa Chen

Gaoqing (courtesy name)
- Chinese: 高卿
Transcriptions
Standard Mandarin
- Hanyu Pinyin: Gāoqīng
- Wade–Giles: Kao-ching

Xuande Xiansheng (art name / pseudonym)
- Chinese: 玄德先生
Transcriptions
Standard Mandarin
- Hanyu Pinyin: Xuándé Xiānshēng

Fa Zhen (100–188), courtesy name – Gaoqing, art name – Xuande Xiansheng, was a reclusive scholar who lived in the Eastern Han dynasty. He was the grandfather of Fa Zheng – a chief adviser to the warlord Liu Bei, who founded the state of Shu Han in the Three Kingdoms era.

== Family background ==
Fa Zhen's ancestral home was in Mei County (郿縣), Fufeng Commandery (扶風郡), which is in present-day – Mei County, Baoji, Shaanxi. His ancestor was Tian Fazhang, who was formally known as King Xiang of the Qi state in the Warring States period. Tian Fazhang's descendants changed their family name from "Tian" to "Fa" after the fall of Qi in 221 BCE. During the reign of Emperor Xuan in the Western Han dynasty, Tian Fazhang's descendants were relocated to the capital province and granted a hereditary official position with an income of 2,000 dan (石) of grain. Fa Zhen's father, Fa Xiong, served as the Administrator (太守) of Nan Commandery (南郡; around present-day Jingzhou, Hubei) during the reign of Emperor An in the Eastern Han dynasty.

== Life ==
Fa Zhen was known for being studious and well versed in readings from different schools of thought. His fame as an erudite scholar spread throughout the Shaanxi and Gansu areas. He had hundreds of students who came from various locations to study under him. Among them was Fan Ran (范冉). The Sanfu Jue Lu Zhu (三輔決錄注) recorded that when Fa Zhen was still a teenager, he once attended a meeting between his father and his father's subordinates. After the meeting, Fa Xiong asked his son, "(Among them,) Who do you think is a great talent?" To this, Fa Zhen replied, "Hu Guang (胡廣) possesses the calibre of a high minister." He was proven right because Hu Guang rose through the ranks later and held positions among the Nine Ministers and Three Ducal Ministers.

Fa Zhen led an unassuming and modest, but reclusive life. The Administrator of Fufeng Commandery heard of him and invited him for a meeting. Fa Zhen wore a fujin (幅巾; a type of headgear similar to bokgeon) to the meeting. The Administrator attempted to use the example of Confucius serving as a politician in the Lu state to persuade Fa Zhen to serve in the Han government. Fa Zhen replied, "I dared to come here because I saw you treating your guests in a respectful manner. However, if you want me to join the civil service, I will travel farther north beyond the northern mountain and farther south beyond the southern mountain." The Administrator was taken aback by Fa Zhen's response and did not dare to speak again about recruiting Fa Zhen into the civil service.

Fa Zhen continued receiving offers to serve in the Han government, but he declined all of them. Tian Ruo (田弱), who was also from Fufeng Commandery, once wrote a memorial recommending Fa Zhen to the imperial court, and recommended Fa again when Emperor Shun visited the Shaanxi region. The emperor consecutively sent out four offers to Fa Zhen to join the civil service, but Fa turned down all of them. Fa Zhen said, "If I can't conceal myself from the rest of the world, can I drink water that will make me deaf to the world?" He then retreated further into seclusion and maintained his refusal to become an official. Guo Zheng (郭正), a friend of Fa Zhen, once said, "You can easily hear news about Fa Zhen, but you can't see him in person easily. He tries to escape from fame but fame follows him; he tries to avoid fame but fame chases him. He is truly a master of hundreds of generations!" Fa Zhen died of natural causes in 188 during the reign of Emperor Ling at the age of 89 (by East Asian age reckoning).

== See also ==
- Fa Xiong, Fa Zhen's father.
- Fa Zheng, Fa Zhen's grandson.
