= Fa Zheng =

Adviser to warlord Liu Bei (176-220)

- 法正
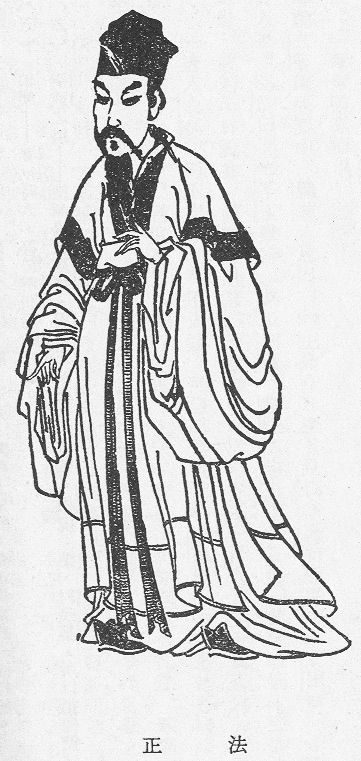
- A Qing dynasty illustration of Fa Zheng

Prefect of the Masters of Writing (尚書令)
- In office 219 – 220
- Monarch: Liu Bei
- Succeeded by: Liu Ba

General Who Protects the Army (護軍將軍)
- In office 219 – 220

General Who Spreads Martial Might (揚武將軍)
- In office 215 – 219

Administrator of Shu Commandery (蜀郡太守)
- In office 215 – 219
- Succeeded by: Yang Hong

Personal details
- Born: 176 (Note: Fa Zheng's biography in the Sanguozhi stated that he died a year after Liu Bei declared himself "King of Hanzhong" in 219. He was 45 years old (by East Asian age reckoning) when he died. (Note: (明年卒，時年四十五。) Sanguozhi vol. 37.) By calculation, Fa Zheng's birth year should be around 176.) Mei County, Shaanxi
- Died: 220 (aged 44)
- Relations: Fa Xiong (great-grandfather); Fa Zhen (grandfather)
- Children: Fa Miao
- Parent: Fa Yan (father)
- Occupation: Official, adviser
- Courtesy name: Xiaozhi (孝直)
- Posthumous name: Marquis Yi (翼侯)

Fa Zheng (176–220), courtesy name Xiaozhi, was a key adviser to the warlord Liu Bei in the late Eastern Han dynasty. Born in a family of high social status and of noble descent, Fa Zheng travelled to Yi Province (covering present-day Sichuan and Chongqing) in the late 190s and became a subordinate of Liu Zhang, the provincial governor. However, his feelings of alienation and perception of Liu Zhang as an incompetent governor eventually led him to betray Liu Zhang and defect to Liu Bei in 211. Between 211 and 214, Fa Zheng assisted Liu Bei in overcoming Liu Zhang and seizing control of Yi Province, and became one of Liu Bei's most trusted advisers. In 217, he urged Liu Bei to launch the Hanzhong Campaign to capture the strategic Hanzhong Commandery from a rival warlord, Cao Cao, but died a year after Liu emerged victorious in the campaign.

Fa Zheng's keen foresight and brilliance in formulating strategies earned him praise from his contemporaries such as Zhuge Liang and Chen Shou. In less than a decade serving under Liu, Fa showed a near unmatched sense of timing where military geniuses like Cao Cao and his best advisers fell victim to his schemes. However, he was also notorious for his vindictive personality. When he held office, he abused his power by taking revenge against those who had offended him before, and by killing them without reason. Nevertheless, he was still highly regarded and trusted by Liu Bei – to the point where Zhuge Liang once said that Fa Zheng might have been the only person capable of preventing Liu Bei's defeat at the Battle of Xiaoting in 221 if he were still alive.

== Family background ==
Fa Zheng's ancestral home was in Mei County (郿縣), Youfufeng Commandery (右扶風郡), which is in present-day Mei County, Shaanxi. His ancestor was Tian Fazhang, who is historically known as King Xiang of the Qi state in the Warring States period. Tian Fazhang's descendants changed their family name from "Tian" to "Fa" after the fall of Qi in 221 BCE.

Fa Zheng's great-grandfather, Fa Xiong, served as the Administrator (太守) of Nan Commandery (南郡; around present-day Jingzhou, Hubei) during the reign of Emperor An in the Eastern Han dynasty. Fa Zheng's grandfather, Fa Zhen, was a reclusive scholar known for his lofty character; despite being a learned scholar, he led a humble life and repeatedly rejected offers to serve in the government. (Note: (法正字孝直，右扶風郿人也。祖父真，有清節高名。) Sanguozhi vol. 37.) Fa Zheng's father, Fa Yan (法衍), whose courtesy name was Jimou (季謀), also served as a government official and held the positions of an assistant to the Excellency over the Masses (司徒) and the Minister of Justice (廷尉). (Note: (三輔決錄注曰：真字高卿， ... 正父衍，字季謀，司徒掾、廷尉左監。) Sanfu Jue Lu Zhu annotation in Sanguozhi vol. 37.)

== Service under Liu Zhang ==
In the early Jian'an era (196–220) of the reign of Emperor Xian, when famines broke out, Fa Zheng and his friend Meng Da (who was from the same commandery) travelled to Yi Province (covering present-day Sichuan and Chongqing) to join the provincial governor, Liu Zhang. Fa Zheng served as the Prefect (令) of Xindu County (新都縣) and later as a Colonel Who Advises the Army (軍議校尉) under Liu Zhang. Since he didn't have any connections with local clans and was defamed by other refugees from Youfufeng, who had also moved to Yi Province, he couldn't realize his ambitions. He maintained a close friendship with his colleague Zhang Song, who shared the same views as him about Liu Zhang being an incompetent and incapable governor. (Note: (建安初，天下饑荒，正與同郡孟達俱入蜀依劉璋，乆之為新都令，後召署軍議校尉。旣不任用，又為其州邑俱僑客者所謗無行，志意不得。益州別駕張松與正相善，忖璋不足與有為，常竊歎息。) Sanguozhi vol. 37.)

In 208, Zhang Song travelled to Jing Province (covering present-day Hubei and Hunan) to meet the warlord Cao Cao, who controlled the Han central government and the figurehead Emperor Xian. After returning to Yi Province, Zhang Song advised Liu Zhang to break ties with Cao Cao and build friendly relations with another warlord, Liu Bei. When Zhang Song recommended Fa Zheng to be Liu Zhang's representative to meet Liu Bei, Fa initially refused to accept the task but eventually relented. When Fa Zheng returned from his mission, he told Zhang Song that Liu Bei had grand ambitions and persuaded Zhang to follow him to serve Liu Bei. They wanted to help him secure Yi province but did not have the occasion to do so. (Note: (松於荊州見曹公還，勸璋絕曹公而自結先主。璋曰：「誰可使者？」松乃舉正，正辭讓，不得已而往。正旣還，為松稱說先主有雄略，密謀協規，願共戴奉，而未有緣。) Sanguozhi vol. 37.)

Their opportunity came in 211, when Liu Zhang became fearful upon receiving news that Cao Cao was planning to attack the warlord Zhang Lu in Hanzhong Commandery. As Hanzhong Commandery was located strategically at the northern route leading into Yi Province, Liu Zhang would be in great peril if Hanzhong fell into Cao Cao's hands. Zhang Song proposed to Liu Zhang to invite Liu Bei to Yi Province to assist them in countering the threat posed by Cao Cao. Liu Zhang agreed and sent Fa Zheng as his envoy to contact Liu Bei. When Fa Zheng met Liu Bei, he secretly told him, "General, with your brilliance, you can overcome our incompetent and weak Governor Liu. Zhang Song, as a trusted adviser (of Liu Zhang), will serve as your spy. Upon acquiring Yi Province's wealth and resources, and having its natural barriers as protection, you can easily realise your grand ambitions." (Note: (後因璋聞曹公欲遣將征張魯之有懼心也，松遂說璋宜迎先主，使之討魯，復令正銜命。正旣宣旨，陰獻策於先主曰：「以明將軍之英才，乘劉牧之懦弱；張松，州之股肱，以響應於內；然後資益州之殷富，馮天府之險阻，以此成業，猶反掌也。」) Sanguozhi vol. 37.) Fa Zheng also saw Liu Bei's marital problems and advised him to have Lady Sun sent back to Wu. Liu Bei accepted Fa Zheng's former advice and led his forces into Yi Province, where he met Liu Zhang at Fu County (涪縣; present-day Fucheng District, Mianyang, Sichuan). Liu Bei then led his troops north to Jiameng (葭萌; located about 20 km northeast of present-day Jiange County, Sichuan) before turning south to attack Liu Zhang later. (Note: (先主然之，泝江而西，與璋會涪。北至葭萌，南還取璋。) Sanguozhi vol. 37.)

== Helping Liu Bei seize Yi Province from Liu Zhang ==
Upon receiving news of Liu Bei's attack, Zheng Du (鄭度), an assistant officer from Guanghan Commandery (廣漢郡; around present-day Guanghan, Sichuan) (Note: (華陽國志曰：度，廣漢人，為州從事。) Huayang Guo Zhi annotation in Sanguozhi vol. 37.) serving under Liu Zhang, pointed out to his lord that Liu Bei's army lacked supplies and was composed of newly recruited soldiers who might not be loyal to him. He suggested that Liu Zhang adopt a scorched earth policy against Liu Bei by forcing the residents of Baxi (巴西) and Zitong (梓潼) commanderies to relocate elsewhere and destroy all the granaries and supply depots in the commanderies, and then fortify their defences while avoiding direct conflict with Liu Bei. He claimed that if this strategy was implemented, Liu Bei would run out of supplies within 100 days and retreat, and then Liu Zhang could attack him while he was retreating. Liu Bei felt frustrated when he heard about Zheng Du's plan and consulted Fa Zheng about it. Fa Zheng predicted that Liu Zhang would not heed Zheng Du's suggestion and was proven right: In response to Zheng Du's plan, Liu Zhang not only rejected it on the grounds that it would cause disturbance to the people, but also dismissed Zheng from office. (Note: (鄭度說璋曰：「左將軍縣軍襲我，兵不滿萬，士衆未附，野穀是資，軍無輜重。其計莫若盡驅巴西、梓潼民內涪水以西，其倉廩野穀一皆燒除，高壘深溝，靜以待之。彼至，請戰，勿許，乆無所資，不過百日，必將自走。走而擊之，則必禽耳。」先主聞而惡之，以問正。正曰：「終不能用，無可憂也。」璋果如正言，謂其羣下曰：「吾聞拒敵以安民，未聞動民以避敵也。」於是黜度，不用其計。) Sanguozhi vol. 37.)

In 214, when Liu Bei's army surrounded Luocheng (雒城), one of Liu Zhang's strongholds, Fa Zheng wrote a long letter to his former lord, pointing out that Liu Zhang was already in a highly disadvantageous position and urging him to give up resistance and surrender to Liu Bei. (Note: (及軍圍雒城，正牋與璋曰：「正受性無術， ... 以保尊門。」) Sanguozhi vol. 37.)

Fa Zheng's letter was written as such:

"I am of the sort that lack talent yet I completed the alliance objective and later came to disobey you. Now I am afraid that your subjects would not comprehend my true reasons hence putting all the blame on myself however I can be mocked by others yet even with their contempt I would still strive to accomplish the mission I was given faithful to my path. I feared that your lordship would trust those baseless rumors therefore I didn't dare to send letter but now when I look back to how I was treated and thinking of the future, I believe It's not too late. Therefore I will admit everything of my heart, from the beginning to the end, from the earliest to the latest moment. I never hide my feelings and even if I would sometimes not do my utmost, I never hide secret plans but my devotion wasn't acknowledged and now we are in this situation. (Note: (「正受性無術，盟好違損，懼左右不明本末，必並歸咎，蒙恥沒身，辱及執事，是以損身於外，不敢反命。恐聖聽穢惡其聲，故中間不有牋敬，顧念宿遇，瞻望悢悢。然惟前後披露腹心，自從始初以至於終，實不藏情，有所不盡，但愚闇策薄，精誠不感，以致於此耳。) Sanguozhi vol. 37.)

At this moment, the affairs of the state are of utmost importance and danger is near yet even if I serve another and my words can easily be hated however may what is left of my loyalty to you be used to share my sentiment on the situation. Wise General, I know well the sentiment of your heart and It is to not lose your good relation with the General of the Left (Note: "The General of the Left" here refers to Liu Bei.) but if we are in this situation is because of your subjects do not understand the way to follow and serve heroes, advocating that one can violate trust and turn his on his vows and instead change his views such as the sun and moon shift looking to only please your ears and eyes with their flattery and fawn therefore cannot plan with thoughtful calculation for the future of the state. The incident already happened therefore they do not judge strength and weakness thinking that the General of the Left's army is isolated far from home with no provisions or grain stored and want to avoid confrontation and just wait for days behind their walls locked together. However when we marched from the pass to here, all of them have been defeated, each of the stronghold and division garrisons have fallen and have been conquered. Even if there are ten thousand troops below Luo castle, they are all weak soldiers and generals of defeated armies. If you thought of fighting a decisive battle then the strength of your troops and generals would be no match. What your strategists wanted to do was to outlast our provisions however now those strongholds have fallen and grain and rice is gathered in great numbers while your own territory Wise General is daily lost and the common people suffer. In that situation, your enemy forces increase and your own supporters grow distant and few. Therefore I have considered those conditions and can say with certainty that you will be defeated first and should not think that you can outlast us. You can try in vain to defend against us but cannot last against us. (Note: (今國事已危，禍害在速，雖捐放於外，言足憎尤，猶貪極所懷，以盡餘忠。明將軍本心，正之所知也，實為區區不欲失左將軍之意，而卒至於是者，左右不達英雄從事之道，謂可違信黷誓，而以意氣相致，日月相遷，趨求順耳悅目，隨阿遂指，不圖遠慮為國深計故也。事變既成，又不量彊弱之勢，以為左將軍縣遠之眾，糧穀無儲，欲得以多擊少，曠日相持。而從關至此，所歷輒破，離宮別屯，日自零落。雒下雖有萬兵，皆壞陳之卒，破軍之將，若欲爭一旦之戰，則兵將勢力，實不相當。各欲遠期計糧者，今此營守已固，穀米已積，而明將軍土地日削，百姓日困，敵對遂多，所供遠曠。愚意計之，謂必先竭，將不復以持久也。) Sanguozhi vol. 37.)

While I'm writing this letter, Zhang Yide's army of tens of thousands has already conquered Badong, entered Qianwei’s borders, with his divisions pacifying Zizhōng and Deyang as they invade by three different roads then how would you resist this? Wise General, surely your strategists believe that this army is far from home with no provisions, their food supply lines being difficult to keep and their troops few with no followers. However the roads of Jing province are connected and their armies increase by tenfolds also General of Chariots and Cavalry (Note: "General of Chariots and Cavalry" here refers to Sun Quan.) sends his younger brother with Li Yi, Gan Ning and others to follow after. Now if you want to compare with our lord's strength then looking at the one with the most territory. Now our side has Badong, Guanghan, Qianwei so over half has already been conquered while the important commandery of Baxi will also soon fall Wise General. At the moment, It can be seen that the whole of Yi province relies only on Shu (commandery), but this province is already defeated and ruined; thow thirds of the province are already lost, officials and common people are impoverished and those with rebellious intent against you are eight out of ten households; If the enemy is distant then the common people cannot endure your conscription while if the enemy is near then they would soon change their allegiance. Just for example, what happened during the conquest of Guanghan’s various counties. Moreover Yufu and Guantou are the gateway who can determine the success or ruin of Yi province and now those gates are open, your strongest cities have fallen and your various armies have been defeated, your soldiers and Generals are weakened while your enemy is several steps in advance and already the province’s heart and guts while you await and defend in Chengdu and Luo and whether you would succeed or fail can already clearly be seen. (Note: (空爾相守，猶不相堪，今張益德數萬之眾，已定巴東，入犍為界，分平資中、德陽，三邈道侵，將何以禦之？本為明將軍計者，必謂此軍縣遠無糧，饋運不及，兵少無繼。今荊州道通，眾數十倍，加孫車騎遣弟及李異、甘寧等為其後繼。若爭客主之勢，以土地相勝者，今此全有巴東，廣漢、犍為，過半已定，巴西一郡，復非明將軍之有也。計益州所仰惟蜀，蜀亦破壞；三分亡二，吏民疲困，思為亂者十戶而八；若敵遠則百姓不能堪役，敵近則一旦易主矣。廣漢諸縣，是明比也。又魚復與關頭實為益州福禍之門，今二門悉開，堅城皆下，諸軍並破，兵將俱盡，而敵家數道並進，已入心腹，坐守都、雒，存亡之勢，昭然可見。) Sanguozhi vol. 37.)

This is only the big picture of what is happening at the moment, the rest is more complex and would be difficult to explain everything. If someone as lowly as me can however comprehend that this situation is doomed and cannot succeed then all the more obvious to the talented ministers in your court Wise General, how they would not understand that that this situation is doomed? From dawn they use flattery and cheat your favour, wishing to keep good appearance's while not thinking of the future, none can devote all of their energy to a long term plan. If danger is near then all of them would first and foremost save their own skins, would strive to help their own families, switch their allegiances back and forth and would be very different of their current composure, not sacrifice themselves for you Wise General however It would be your honored household that would be victim of the disaster they fear. Even if I am already branded as a disloyal man, my heart keep me from turning back against your holiness’s virtue. Only when I look back at my separate mission, I am truly sad that I had to leave you behind. It is the same for the General of the Left and truly he has no unkind intentions. Sincerely, I truly believe that you can still change your plans and then would be able to save your honored household from misfortune." (Note: (斯乃大略，其外較耳，其餘屈曲，難以辭極也。以正下愚，猶知此事不可復成，況明將軍左右明智用謀之士，豈當不見此數哉？旦夕偷幸，求容取媚，不慮遠圖，莫肯盡心獻良計耳。若事窮勢迫，將各索生，求濟門戶，展轉反覆，與今計異，不為明將軍盡死難也。而尊門猶當受其憂。正雖獲不忠之謗，然心自謂不負聖德，顧惟分義，實竊痛心。左將軍從本舉來，舊心依依，實無薄意。愚以為可圖變化，以保尊門。」) Sanguozhi vol. 37.)

Later that year, when Liu Bei's forces was besieging Yi Province's capital Chengdu, Xu Jing, a commandery Administrator serving under Liu Zhang, planned to surrender and defect to Liu Bei, but his plan was leaked out and hence aborted. Liu Zhang felt that he was already at the brink of destruction so he did not punish Xu Jing. He eventually surrendered and relinquished his control of Yi Province to Liu Bei. After taking over Yi Province, Liu Bei treated Xu Jing coldly because he felt that Xu was a disloyal person. Fa Zheng advised him, "Xu Jing is someone with an exaggerated reputation. However, my lord, you've recently built your foundation and you can't possibly explain the facts to everyone. Xu Jing's name is already well known throughout the Empire. If you don't treat him respectfully, others might think that you're belittling talented and virtuous people. You should honour and respect him, and make this known to everyone, just like how the King of Yan treated Guo Wei (郭隗)." Liu Bei followed Fa Zheng's advice and treated Xu Jing generously. (Note: (十九年，進圍成都，璋蜀郡太守許靖將踰城降，事覺，不果。璋以危亡在近，故不誅靖。璋旣稽服，先主以此薄靖不用也。正說曰：「天下有獲虛譽而無其實者，許靖是也。然今主公始創大業，天下之人不可戶說，靖之浮稱，播流四海，若其不禮，天下之人以是謂主公為賤賢也。宜加敬重，以眩遠近，追昔燕王之待郭隗。」先主於是乃厚待靖。) Sanguozhi vol. 37.)

Sun Sheng criticizes Fa Zheng for his advice and the comparison between Guo Wei and Xu Jing :

"One of the most important path of statecraft is to respect the worthies while rewarding virtue and visiting the tombs and gates of past rulers following this example. Hence one must seek after those exceptional and profound of high righteousness reigning over their time, only then can one overlook the land and mixed with the multitude. If this is not such a man then this way shouldn't be followed. Xu Jing while in the household of his kinsman (Note: "kinsman" here refers to Liu Zhang.) was not devoted, was put in charge where he didn't belong and when in face of danger was quick to change his heart, his safety was what matters most. How could after that he should be given favor to encourage others? In that case, the favor given to the superficial and false is taken from the worthies unfairly taking their merits then how with what courtesy would they be treated with? Fa Zheng's method just confuse people and detach from the noble and esteemed even give the example of Guo Wei wronging natural human relations." (Note: (孫盛曰：夫禮賢崇德，為邦之要道，封墓式閭，先王之令軌，故必以體行英邈，高義蓋世，然後可以延視四海，振服羣黎。苟非其人，道不虛行。靖處室則友于不穆，出身則受位非所，語信則夷險易心，論識則殆為釁首，安在其可寵先而有以感致者乎？若乃浮虛是崇，偷薄斯榮，則秉直杖義之士將何以禮之？正務眩惑之術，違貴尚之風，譬之郭隗，非其倫矣。) Sun Sheng's annotation in Sanguozhi vol. 37.)

Pei Songzhi completely disagrees with Sun Sheng's opinion:

"Your servant believes that though Guo Wei was not worthy, he received favor for his ability in planning. Moreover, Wenxiu (Note: "Wenxiu" was Xu Jing's courtesy name.) already had a reputation through the whole empire as an outstanding and great individual even if he made mistakes in the latter years, yet the matter was not as simple. If such a man wasn't treated with respect, how could it not be confused by the people near and far? Fa Zheng's comparison between Xu Jing and Guo Wei wasn't bad, but Sun Sheng made matters complicated by citing honoring tombs and visiting gates; how pedantic! If he was right, then even King Zhao of Yan would be in the wrong; how could the blame be solely on Old Liu (Liu Bei)? As for non-devotion to his kinsman, the fault was with Zijiang. (Note: "Zijiang" was Xu Shao's courtesy name.) Just looking at the discussion of Jiang Ji, one can understand that it wasn't Wenxiu's fault. Also, Sun Sheng mocked him for being appointed where he didn't belong; this refers to his service to Dong Zhuo. When Zhuo first gained control of the government, he recruited all the worthies and talented, among those who received rank and office all were awe-inspiring like this. Wenxiu was already an official before Zhuo arrived. Later, he was promoted as Palace Deputy and accepted it. If this should be considered as disparaged, then Xun Shuang and Chen Ji should also be rejected in their times." (Note: (臣松之以為郭隗非賢，猶以權計蒙寵，況文休名聲夙著，天下謂之英偉，雖末年有瑕，而事不彰徹，若不加禮，何以釋遠近之惑乎？法正以靖方隗，未為不當，而盛以封墓式閭為難，何其迃哉！然則燕昭亦非，豈唯劉翁？至於友于不穆，失由子將，尋蔣濟之論，知非文休之尤。盛又譏其受任非所，將謂仕於董卓。卓初秉政，顯擢賢俊，受其策爵者森然皆是。文休為選官，在卓未至之前，後遷中丞，不為超越。以此為貶，則荀爽、陳紀之儔皆應擯棄於世矣。) Pei Songzhi's annotation in Sanguozhi vol. 37.)

== Service under Liu Bei ==
=== Becoming Liu Bei's Chief Adviser ===
Liu Bei appointed Fa Zheng as the Administrator (太守) of Shu Commandery (蜀郡) and General Who Spreads Martial Might (揚武將軍). Fa Zheng oversaw administrative affairs in the vicinity of Yi Province's capital Chengdu. While Zhuge Liang was promoted to administer internal affairs, Fa Zheng served as Liu Bei's chief adviser. (Note: (以正為蜀郡太守、揚武將軍，外統都畿，內為謀主。) Sanguozhi vol. 37.) (Note: (先主復領益州牧，諸葛亮為股肱，法正為謀主，) Sanguozhi vol. 32.)

Following Liu Bei's victory over Liu Zhang, his subordinates urged him to take for wife Liu Mao's widow. However Liu Bei refused on the basics that he and Liu Mao were of the same family. Fa Zheng then to convince him said: "In the ancient times, lady Huai Ying first married the Duke Huai of Jin and later married his own brother, the Duke Wen of Jin. If the marriage of a widow between brothers happened by the past then why not for you and Liu Mao who are not close kinsman?" Liu Bei agreed with him and married Lady Wu.

During this period of time, Fa Zheng repaid all of his previous debts, good or bad. He would not forget those who showed him even a little kindness but also abused his power by taking revenge against those who offended him before. And by killing those who harmed him without the legal authority. Someone approached Zhuge Liang, another of Liu Bei's key advisers, and urged him to restrict Fa Zheng's influence by advising their lord to take action against him. However, Zhuge Liang replied, "When our lord was in Gong'an, he was wary of Cao Cao's influence in the north and fearful of Sun Quan's presence in the east. Even in home territory he was afraid that Lady Sun might stir up trouble. He was in such a difficult situation at the time that he could neither advance nor retreat. Fa Xiaozhi supported and helped him so much that he became his own wings (翼), (Note: The word (翼) which can be translated as "wing", used by Zhuge Liang here to describe Fa Zheng's role in Liu Bei's ascension is the same that was awarded to him as his posthumous title.) such that he is now able to fly high and no longer remain under others' influence. How can we stop Fa Zheng from behaving as he wishes?" Zhuge Liang was aware that Liu Bei greatly favoured and trusted Fa Zheng, which was why he refused to intervene in this matter. (Note: (一飡之德，睚眦之怨，無不報復，擅殺毀傷己者數人。或謂諸葛亮曰：「法正於蜀郡太縱橫，將軍宜啟主公，抑其威福。」亮荅曰：「主公之在公安也，北畏曹公之彊，東憚孫權之逼，近則懼孫夫人生變於肘腋之下；當斯之時，進退狼跋，法孝直為之輔翼，令翻然翱翔，不可復制，如何禁止法正使不得行其意邪！」初，孫權以妹妻先主，妹才捷剛猛，有諸兄之風，侍婢百餘人，皆親執刀侍立，先主每入，衷心常凜凜；亮又知先主雅愛信正，故言如此。) Sanguozhi vol. 37.)

The historian Sun Sheng criticised Zhuge Liang's attitude towards Fa Zheng's abuse of power and called it a "lapse in justice". He felt that no subject should be above the law, regardless of how great his past contributions were. (Note: (孫盛曰：夫威福自下，亡家害國之道，刑縱於寵，毀政亂理之源，安可以功臣而極其陵肆，嬖幸而藉其國柄者哉？故顛頡雖勤，不免違命之刑，楊干雖親，猶加亂行之戮，夫豈不愛，王憲故也。諸葛氏之言，於是乎失政刑矣。) Sun Sheng's annotation in Sanguozhi vol. 37.) Tang Geng (唐庚), a scholar from the Song dynasty, in his work Three Kingdoms Miscellaneous Cases (三國雜事; Sanguo Zashi) compared Fa Zheng to Fan Ju (范雎), Li Guang and Guo Jin (郭進 (Note: Guo Jin was a general of the Northern Song dynasty.)); the three of them were allowed to settle their personal grudges and rendered great achievements for their States. Tang Geng commented that this is how rulers of the past made use of their outstanding and heroic individuals, that they had their own conceptions of righteousness. Tang Geng called Sun Sheng shortsighted for not seeing this.

=== Role in the Hanzhong Campaign ===
In 217, Fa Zheng urged Liu Bei to attack Hanzhong Commandery, which was originally under Zhang Lu's control but was conquered by Cao Cao in 215. He pointed out Hanzhong's strategic importance and said that it was an opportune moment for Liu Bei to seize Hanzhong from Cao Cao's generals Xiahou Yuan and Zhang He. He told Liu Bei: "Cao Cao with a single strike was able to submit Zhang Lu into surrender and acquire Hanzhong, however he did not press his advantage to conquer Ba and Shu. Instead he returned North and left Xiahou Yuan and Zhang He. This cannot be an error of his part or because of a lack of strength, but rather because he met some internal problems and must solve them. Now Xiahou Yuan and Zhang He can't compare against our army. If we advance, we will surely capture them. Then we can collect grains, fill our storehouse readying ourselves for any opportunities. If we are successful we can vanquish the enemy and restore the ruling House, otherwise we can expand our borders into the Liang province and in any case we would have gain a most important position to defend and prepare ourselves. Heaven is on our side, you must not lose this chance." Liu Bei accepted his plan and started the Hanzhong Campaign with Fa Zheng following him. (Note: (二十二年，正說先主曰：「曹操一舉而降張魯，定漢中，不因此勢以圖巴、蜀，而留夏侯淵、張郃屯守，身遽北還，此非其智不逮而力不足也，必將內有憂偪故耳。今策淵、郃才略，不勝國之將帥，舉衆往討，則必可克之，克之日，廣農積穀，觀釁伺隙，上可以傾覆寇敵，尊獎王室，中可以蠶食雍、涼，廣拓境土，下可以固守要害，為持乆之計。此蓋天以與我，時不可失也。」先主善其策，乃率諸將進兵漢中，正亦從行。) Sanguozhi vol. 37.)

In 219, during the Battle of Mount Dingjun, when Xiahou Yuan led troops to attack Liu Bei's camps at Dingjun and Xingshi mountains, Fa Zheng suggested Liu Bei to strike the enemy. Liu Bei ordered his general Huang Zhong to lead his men on a charge down the mountain towards Xiahou Yuan's forces, with war drums beating in the background. Huang Zhong defeated and killed Xiahou Yuan in the midst of battle. (Note: (二十四年，先主自陽平南渡沔水，緣山稍前，於定軍、興勢作營。淵將兵來爭其地。正曰：「可擊矣。」先主命黃忠乘高鼓譟攻之，大破淵軍，淵等授首。) Sanguozhi vol. 37.)

Later, when Cao Cao was leading his forces from Chang'an to reinforce Hanzhong, he received news about the strategy proposed by Fa Zheng to Liu Bei to attack Hanzhong. He remarked, "I know Xuande (Liu Bei) is not capable of doing this. He must be following somebody's advice." (Note: (曹公西征，聞正之策，曰：「吾故知玄德不辨有此，必為人所教也。」) Sanguozhi vol. 37.) According to the Chronicles of Huayang, Cao Cao also said: "How could it be that among my army of bold heroes, none could find a strategy that would overcome this Fa Zheng?" The historian Pei Songzhi commented that Cao Cao made that former remark – which suggests that Liu Bei was not wise enough to notice Hanzhong's strategic importance – because of his personal disdain for Liu, and that it should not be taken seriously. He felt that a lord acting on his adviser's suggestion should not be interpreted as a sign that the lord was not wise enough to make his own judgment. He pointed out that Cao Cao himself also followed the advice of his adviser Guo Jia. (Note: (臣松之以為蜀與漢中，其由脣齒也。劉主之智，豈不及此？將計略未展，正先發之耳。夫聽用嘉謀以成功業，霸王之主，誰不皆然？魏武以為人所教，亦豈劣哉！此蓋耻恨之餘辭，非測實之當言也。) Pei Songzhi's annotation in Sanguozhi vol. 37.)

== Death and postmortem events ==
In 219, after Liu Bei emerged victorious in the Hanzhong Campaign, he declared himself "King of Hanzhong" (漢中王) and appointed Fa Zheng as the Prefect of the Masters of Writing (尚書令) and General Who Protects the Army (護軍將軍). Fa Zheng died in the following year at the age of 45 (by East Asian age reckoning). Liu Bei cried for days when Fa Zheng died and awarded Fa the posthumous title "Marquis Yi" (翼侯), which literally means "marquis of the flank". Alone, the Yi (翼) word/title is more commonly translated as "wing". Therefore, Fa's posthumous title can also be translated as "marquis of the wing". (Note: (先主立為漢中王，以正為尚書令、護軍將軍。明年卒，時年四十五。先主為之流涕者累日。謚曰翼侯。) Sanguozhi vol. 37.)

During Liu Bei's short reign, many of his long term companions and famous generals had died. Among them were Guan Yu, Zhang Fei, Ma Chao, Pang Tong and Huang Zhong; yet Fa Zheng was the only one to receive a posthumous title, (Note: Per Liu Shan's biography in Sanguozhi, Guan, Zhang, Ma, Pang and Huang were only given posthumous names in the 9th month of the 3rd year of the Jingyao era; the month corresponds to 23 Oct to 20 Nov 260 in the Julian calendar.) such was the extent to which Liu Bei valued Fa Zheng. Fa Zheng's son, Fa Miao (法邈), received the title of a Secondary Marquis (關內侯) and served as a Commandant of Equipage (奉車都尉) and the Administrator of Hanyang Commandery (漢陽郡) in the state of Shu Han, which Liu Bei established in 221. (Note: (賜子邈爵關內侯，官至奉車都尉、漢陽太守。) Sanguozhi vol. 37.)

Fa Zheng and Zhuge Liang did not share the same moral beliefs but they had a good working relationship because of their common goal, which was to serve Liu Bei well. Zhuge Liang was very impressed with Fa Zheng's brilliance. In 221, before the Battle of Xiaoting, many of Liu Bei's subjects advised their lord against going to war with his former ally, Sun Quan, who seized Jing Province from Liu in 219 and executed Liu's general Guan Yu. Liu Bei ignored them and proceeded with his campaign against Sun Quan. In the following year, he lost to Sun Quan's forces at the Battle of Xiaoting and had to retreat to Baidicheng, where he died in 223. Zhuge Liang sighed, "If Fa Xiaozhi was still alive, he could have prevented our lord from going on this eastern campaign; even if our lord did go on this campaign, he wouldn't have ended up in this disastrous situation (if Fa Xiaozhi was with him)." (Note: (諸葛亮與正，雖好尚不同，以公義相取。亮每奇正智術。先主旣即尊號，將東征孫權以復關羽之耻，羣臣多諫，一不從。章武二年，大軍敗績，還住白帝。亮歎曰：「法孝直若在，則能制主上，令不東行；就復東行，必不傾危矣。」) Sanguozhi vol. 37.)

Zhuge Liang might be right about Fa Zheng, as inferred from an incident during the Hanzhong Campaign. During one battle, when the odds turned against Liu Bei, Liu's subjects urged their lord to retreat but he stubbornly refused. They did not dare to advise him again for fear of incurring his wrath. Fa Zheng rushed forth and stood in front of Liu Bei when Cao Cao's forces rained arrows on their camp. Liu Bei told Fa Zheng to stay under cover to avoid the arrows, but Fa insisted on braving the arrows with his lord. Liu Bei then decided to retreat together with Fa Zheng. (Note: (先主與曹公爭，勢有不便，宜退，而先主大怒不肯退，無敢諫者。矢下如雨，正乃往當先主前，先主云：「孝直避箭。」正曰：「明公親當矢石，況小人乎？」先主乃曰：「孝直，吾與汝俱去。」遂退。) Pei Songzhi's annotation in Sanguozhi vol. 37.)

== Appraisal ==
Chen Shou, who wrote Fa Zheng's biography in the Sanguozhi, appraised Fa as follows: "Fa Zheng clearly foresaw success and failure. Therefore, he had talent for all sort of unusual tactics and strategies. However, he was not known to be of good moral character. In comparison with officials from (Cao) Wei, Pang Tong would be similar to Xun Yu like a brother while Fa Zheng would be of the same nefarious kind as Cheng and Guo." (Note: (評曰： ... 法正著見成敗，有奇畫策筭，然不以德素稱也。儗之魏臣，統其荀彧之仲叔，正其程、郭之儔儷邪？) Sanguozhi vol. 37.)

Yang Xi, who wrote the Ji Han Fuchen Zan (季漢輔臣贊; pub. 241), a collection of praises of notable persons who served in the Shu Han state, appraised him as follows: "Marquis Yi (翼侯; Fa Zheng) was talented for stratagem, could anticipate both rise and decline of the world. Entrusted with the foundation by his Lord, he answered with correct instruction and counsel. With a swift thought he managed his calculation, would observe the situation and perceive the opportunity." (Note: (翼侯良謀，料世興衰。委質於主，是訓是諮。暫思經算，睹事知機。〈贊法孝直〉) Sanguozhi vol. 45.)

== In popular culture ==
Fa Zheng became a playable character in Koei's Dynasty Warriors 8: Xtreme Legends.

== See also ==
- Lists of people of the Three Kingdoms
