= Yang Hong (Shu Han) =

Shu Han politician (died 228)

- 楊洪
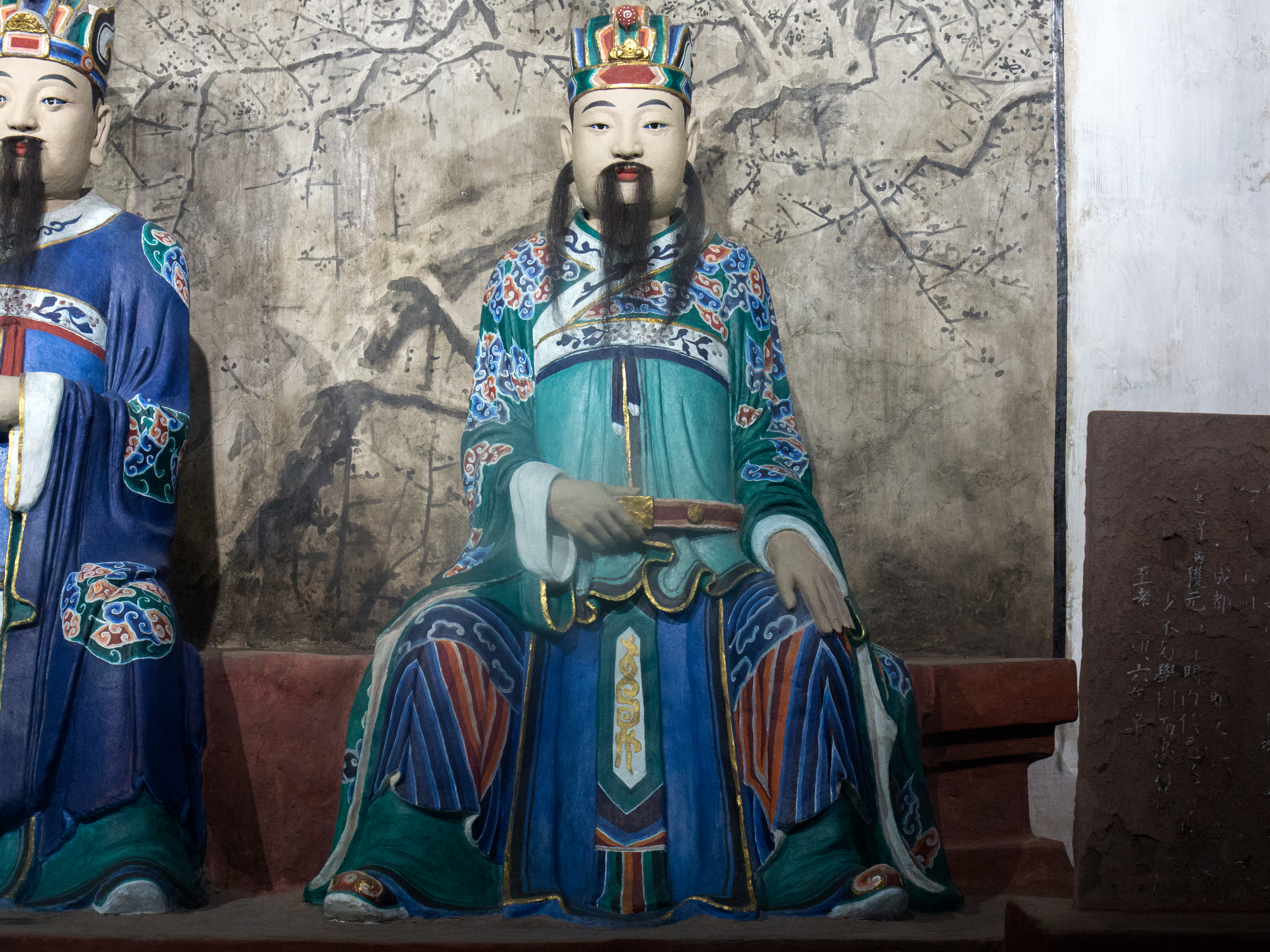
- Statue of Yang Hong in a temple in Chengdu, Sichuan

Officer of Merit (功曹)
- In office 214 – ?
- Monarch: Liu Bei

Administrator of Shu Commandery (蜀郡太守)
- In office 219 – 228
- Monarch: Liu Bei / Liu Shan
- Preceded by: Fa Zheng

General of Loyalty and Integrity (忠節將軍)
- In office 223 – ?
- Monarch: Liu Shan

Lieutenant Cavalry of Yueqi (越騎校尉)
- In office ? – 228
- Monarch: Liu Shan

Personal details
- Born: Unknown Pengshan, Sichuan
- Died: 228
- Occupation: Official
- Courtesy name: Jixiu (季休)
- Peerage: Secondary Marquis (關內侯)

Yang Hong (died 228), courtesy name Jixiu, was an official of the state of Shu Han during the Three Kingdoms period of China.

== Early life ==
Yang Hong was from Wuyang County (武陽), Qianwei Commandery (犍為), which is located within present-day Pengshan, Sichuan. When Liu Zhang was the governor of the Yi Province, he served successively in several commanderies. After Liu Bei successfully conquered Yi province, Li Yan recommended him as an Officer of Merit (功曹). Later, Li Yan wished to relocate the Administrator's headquarters, however Yang Hong firmly opposed this decision and in the end his opinion was ignored. Following this, he resigned from his position as an Officer of Merit. However, Li Yan still recommended Yang Hong to the Prefectural capital as an official.

== Service under Liu Bei ==
Afterward, when Liu Bei battling Xiahou Yuan at Hanzhong, he sends requests for reinforcement to be sent. At this time, Zhuge Liang was in charge of the approvisionnement and asked Yang Hong's opinion about this. Yang Hong told him:

"Hanzhong is at the Yi province's throat, It is of the utmost importance between our survival and destruction. Without Hanzhong then there would be no state left to defend and this disaster is right at the doors of our houses. At this moment, all should do their best. Men should fight the enemy and women should transport the provision. Why having any restraint about sending more troops? "

Zhuge Liang agreed with Yang Hong's opinion.

At the same moment, the Administrator of Shu Commandery (蜀郡太守), Fa Zheng was helping Liu Bei in the north. Zhuge Liang sends a memorial to have Yang Hong take the vacant position, he quickly adapted and the many problems were soon all resolved therefore he was given the formal appointment. Soon he was relocated to another office in Yi province.

After Liu Bei proclaimed himself emperor, he launched a campaign against Wu but was unsuccessful and retreated to Yongan. At this time, the Administrator of Hanjia Huang Yuan (黃元) had a bad relationship with Zhuge Liang and fearing that after Liu Bei's death would have problems led a rebellion in his commandery, he burned down the city of Linqiong. During this Zhuge Liang had left to examine the condition of Liu Bei therefore Chengdu was weak and badly defended, Huang Yuan was all the more excessive and fearless in his attitude. Yang Hong at once informed Liu Chan to dispatch their own personal troops along with the Generals Chen Hu (陳曶) and Zheng Chuo (鄭綽) to suppress Huang Yuan's rebellion.

Everyone was afraid that if Huang Yuan failed to conquer Chengdu, he would try to occupy Hanzhong from Yuexi. However, Yang Hong said:

"Huang Yuan always had the temperament of a violent and brutal man and had no virtue or faith in others, how could he accomplish such a task? All he can hope for is going east to our Lord, praying that he is safe and calm, so he can submit to him and receive death however if he is doubtful then he will flee to Wu and beg for his life. Just order Chen Hu and Zheng Chuo to lead their men at the enter of Nan'an and wait for his arrival."

And indeed, Yang Hong's prediction was true and Huang Yuan was taken alive. After this, he was enfeoffed as a Secondary Marquis (關內侯), resumed his occupation as Administrator of Shu Commandery and given the rank of General of Loyalty and Integrity (越騎校尉) and later became Lieutenant Cavalry of Yueqi (越騎校尉).

== Service under Liu Shan ==
In 227, Zhuge Liang moved to the north and made his headquarters in Hanzhong, wanted to employ Zhang Yi in his office as his Chief Clerk (長史) and asked Yang Hong's opinion about this. Yang Hong told him:

"Zhang Yi is by nature a smart and insightful man with skill and earnestness in governorship. His sole talent is enough for this task, however one should fear that he wouldn't be impartial in this specific appointment. I would rather advise to have Xiang Lang, by nature he is honest and sincere. Zhang Yi would serve below him and develop his own potential. In that case, both of them would work at their best."

When young, Yang Hong and Zhang Yi were close friend however when Zhang Yi was in exile in Wu and Yang Hong temporarily took charge of his commandery. He didn't give special treatment to his son Zhang Yu, who was a minor official when he committed a small offence. When Zhang Yi came back to Shu, he heard about this and was resentful of Yang Hong, from this moment their relation deteriorated.

Later, when Yang Hong saw that Zhuge Liang was raising troops. He personally visited Zhang Yi and told him what he advised Zhuge Liang about him. Zhang Yi answered that Zhuge Liang already appointed him and that he couldn't prevail this. People were thinking that Yang Hong's intention was to be chief clerk at the place of Zhang Yi or that knowing Zhang Yi was resentful of him, Yang Hong didn't want for him to occupy a critical position and manage important matters. However, when in position, Zhang Yi had conflict with the Colonel (校尉) Chen Shu (岑述) until their relation reached hatred and anger. Zhuge Liang knew about this and send a letter to Zhang Yi where he reprimand him for not putting the interest of the State before his personal relation. Because of this event, the people understood that Yang Hong was truthful in his statement.

== Appraisal ==
When Yang Hong was young, he didn't enjoy scholarship, but he was a faithful and altruistic man. He was concerned about the wellbeing of others as if they were his own family and was known to treat his stepmother with utmost filial piety. He died while serving in office in 228. At first, Yang Hong served under Li Yan but due to personal opinions, he retired however while Li Yan was still serving as Administrator of Qianwei, Yang Hong had been already relocated as Administrator of Shu Commandery. At this time, he was helped by He Zhi, who served under him as a personal Aide Officer. He Zhi was talented, cunning, made numerous accomplishments and was soon promoted to the role of Prefect. Several years later, he was promoted again to be the Administrator of Guanghan. At the same time, Yang Hong was still serving as the Administrator of Shu Commandery. Because of this, all the people in the west admired Zhuge Liang for his ability to thoroughly employ the men of great talent.

== See also ==
- Lists of people of the Three Kingdoms
