= Zhang Song =

Chinese advisor to warlord Liu Zhang (died 213)

- 張松
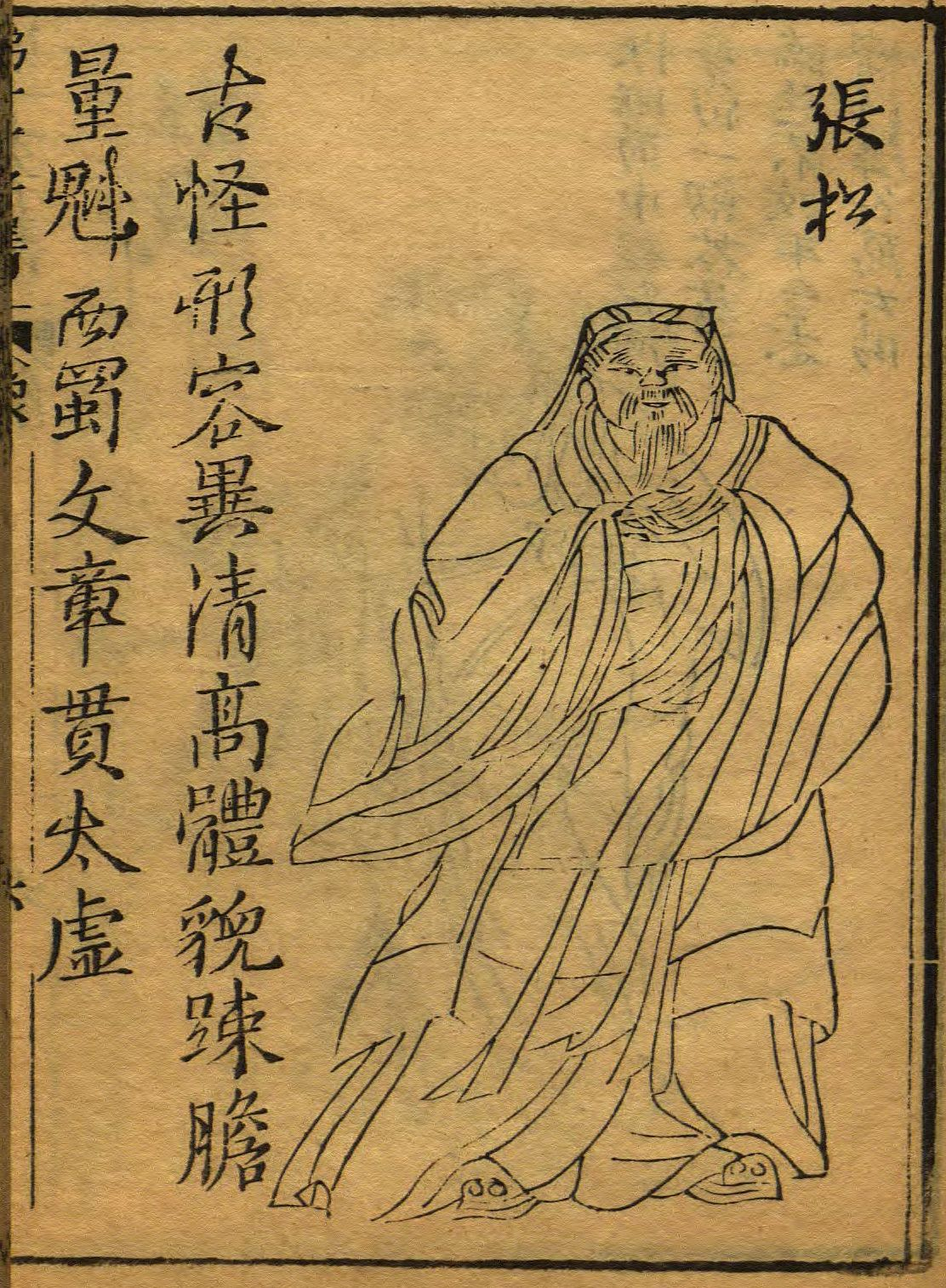

Aide-de-camp (別駕從事) (under Liu Zhang)
- In office ? – 213

Personal details
- Born: Unknown Chengdu, Sichuan
- Died: 213 (Note: The 17th year of the Jian'an era ended on 8 February 213 in the Julian calendar. Zhang Song's execution is one of the last recorded events of the year. Thus, Zhang Song likely died in January or February 213.) Chengdu, Sichuan
- Relatives: Zhang Su (brother); Zhang Biao (nephew/adopted son)
- Occupation: Official, adviser
- Courtesy name: Ziqiao (子喬)

Zhang Song (died January or February 213), courtesy name Ziqiao, was an official and adviser serving under the warlord Liu Zhang during the late Eastern Han dynasty of China.

== Life ==
Zhang Song was born in Shu Commandery (蜀郡), which is in present-day Chengdu, Sichuan. He started his career as an adviser to Liu Zhang, the Governor of Yi Province (益州牧) during the Eastern Han dynasty. His appointment was Aide-de-camp (別駕從事).

In late 208, Zhang Song received his first mission when Liu Zhang sent him after his brother Zhang Su (張肅) as emissary to Cao Cao. Around this time, Cao Cao recently conquered the majority of Jing Province and drove off Liu Bei at the battle of Changban. Therefore, he didn't care for Zhang Song which greatly angered him. The Han Jin Chunqiu (漢晉春秋) further described that when they met, Cao Cao was condescending towards Zhang Song and didn't show any interest in him. When he returned, Zhang Song advised Liu Zhang to break his relation with Cao Cao.

Following this, Cao Cao lost the battle of Chibi with many of his soldiers dying from disease. As for Zhang Song, he harshly criticized Cao Cao, urging Liu Zhang to sever his relation with him. At the same time, he encouraged Liu Zhang to establish friendly relation with Liu Bei, advocating that they were from the same clan. Liu Zhang agreed to his proposal and sent Fa Zheng to begin exchanges with Liu Bei. Liu Zhang also ordered Fa Zheng, along with Meng Da to lead several thousand soldiers to help Liu Bei in his defence of Jing. Fa Zheng afterwards was called back.

Around 211, when Liu Zhang received news that Cao Cao was planning to attack Zhang Lu, another warlord in the neighbouring Hanzhong Commandery, he became fearful that Cao Cao would attack Yi Province after defeating Zhang Lu. Zhang Song reassured Liu Zhang and advised him to invite Liu Bei to lead his troops into Yi to help him in the subjugation of Zhang Lu. Zhang Song told him: "Cao Cao's armies are strong and without a match in the empire. If he was able to use Zhang Lu's grain stores then launch an invasion of Yi province, who could stop him?" Liu Zhang answered that he was worried but without a plan. Zhang Song answered: "Liu Bei is of the same clan as you and he is an unstoppable rival of Cao Cao. He commands troops with talent. If we use him to conquer Zhang Lu, Zhang Lu would surely be defeated. With Zhang Lu vanquished, Yi province would be safe and even if Cao Cao were to come, he would be defeated."

Thereafter, Zhang Song again pressed Liu Zhang: “In the whole province, Pang Xi, Li Yi (李異) and other officials act in arrogant and superior ways because of their achievements. Soon they will have more ambition than they should. If you don't obtain the support of Liu Bei then we risk to be surrounded by enemies from outside and traitors from inside. Then the situation would be really desperate.”

Liu Zhang heeded Zhang Song's advice and ordered his subordinate Fa Zheng to lead 4,000 men to welcome Liu Bei into Yi Province. In addition, he presented Liu Bei with several precious gifts. Huang Quan opposed the decision while his attendant Wang Lei (王累), from Guanghan (廣漢) hanged himself at the city gate in protest. Liu Zhang didn't listen to any of them, and even ordered the different places to supply Liu Bei's army.

Zhang Song and Fa Zheng had long privately disapproved of Liu Zhang's governance and looked at Liu Bei as a solution for a legitimate successor. Previously, when Liu Bei met them, he welcomed them warmly and treated them with kindness. He also used this opportunity to learn more crucial information about Yi Province, such as the geography, supplies and deployment of military forces. Zhang Song even drew a map of Yi Province and gave it to Liu Bei. As time passed, Zhang Song conceived the idea of betraying Liu Zhang and helping Liu Bei seize control of Yi Province from Liu Zhang, so he contacted Fa Zheng, who agreed to join him. With their help, Liu Bei learned all about Yi province. Liu Zhang invited Liu Bei to join him in Yi Province to capture Hanzhong Commandery before Cao Cao did.

Liu Bei led an expedition force of several ten thousands soldiers into Yi Province after leaving behind Zhuge Liang, Guan Yu, Zhang Fei and Zhao Yun to guard Jing Province. Liu Zhang welcomed Liu Bei at Fu County (涪縣; present-day Mianyang, Sichuan). Liu Zhang personally welcomed them, acting in friendly way. Zhang Song told Fa Zheng to report to Liu Bei that with Pang Tong backing, they could ambush Liu Zhang at the meeting spot. However, Liu Bei thought that the plan was too hasty for such an important act.

At the beginning of the year 213, Zhang Song stayed at Chengdu while Fa Zheng and Meng Da accompanied Liu Bei. There were discussions that Liu Bei may leave to defend Jing. Hearing about this, Zhang Song sent a letter to Fa Zheng and Liu Bei, arguing that with success so close, they couldn't leave. Zhang Song's brother Zhang Su (張肅) learned about his brother's plot and secret communications with Liu Bei. Afraid of being implicated, Zhang Su secretly reported his brother to Liu Zhang, who had Zhang Song arrested and executed. Furthermore, Liu Zhang ordered his officers guarding the passes to Chengdu to keep secret documents and letters to Liu Bei. When Liu Bei heard about Zhang Song's death, he exclaimed, "Junjiao (Note: According to Chronicles of Huayang, Liu Bei was exclaimed “君矯殺吾內主乎！” Some opinion regard Junjiao (君矯) was the courtesy name of Zhang Song's brother, Zhang Su, but some opinion regard “矯殺” as a term that means “to kill under false pretenses”, and consider Junjiao was not his courtesy name.) killed my spy!"

== Family ==
Zhang Song's elder brother, Zhang Su (張肅), whose courtesy name was Junjiao (君矯), was also from Shu Commandery (蜀郡). When he was sent as emissary to Cao Cao, the year previously to Zhang Song, he impressed him and was appointed as Administrator of Guanghan (廣漢太守). Zhang Su's appearance is described as awe-inspiring and extremely impressive, while Zhang Song was a short and puny man who did not exercise restraint or care about morality. However, Zhang Song was also knowledgeable with good discernment and possessed ability. When Liu Zhang sent him to Cao Cao, Cao Cao wasn't polite to him. The Registrar Yang Xiu deeply respected him, and even recommended Cao Cao to have Zhang Song joined his personal staff, but Cao Cao refused his proposition. During a feast, Yang Xiu showed Zhang Song the military books that Cao Cao had written. While making merry, Zhang Song quickly had all of them read and memorized them through and through. After this event, Yang Xiu esteemed him even more.

Zhang Biao (張表), whose courtesy name was Boda (伯達), was chosen to administer the south after Ma Zhong. Zhang Biao was the biological son of Zhang Su. As Zhang Su was responsible for the death of Zhang Song when he reported him to Liu Zhang, Liu Bei hated him greatly and dismissed him from office. Zhang Song had no children, therefore Liu Bei had Zhang Biao posthumously adopted by Zhang Song to continue his family line.

== In Romance of the Three Kingdoms ==
In the 14th-century historical novel Romance of the Three Kingdoms, Zhang Song is portrayed as a short, buck-toothed man with a short nose who does not command respect for his ugly looks. In the novel, his courtesy name is Yongnian (永年).

Liu Zhang sends Zhang Song as an envoy to meet Cao Cao. He brings with him a map of Yi Province and hopes to present it to Cao Cao and aid him in conquering Yi Province from Liu Zhang. However, Cao Cao dislikes Zhang Song for his appearance and treats him rudely. In retaliation, Zhang Song makes sarcastic remarks to humiliate Cao Cao, who orders his men to beat up Zhang Song and chase him away. Zhang Song is deeply upset by Cao Cao's attitude towards him, so he leaves for Jing Province and meets Liu Bei along the way. Liu Bei treats Zhang Song like an honoured guest. Zhang Song is so impressed with Liu Bei's hospitality that he presents the map to Liu Bei and urges him to conquer Yi Province from Liu Zhang. He also introduces his colleagues Fa Zheng and Meng Da to Liu Bei and tells him that they will aid him in defeating Liu Zhang.

Zhang Song is executed by Liu Zhang after the latter discovers that he is plotting against him.

== See also ==
- Lists of people of the Three Kingdoms
