= He Zhi (Shu Han) =

3rd-century Shu Han politician

- 何祗

Administrator of Qianwei (犍為太守)
- In office ?–?
- Monarch: Liu Shan
- Succeeded by: Wang Li

Administrator of Guanghan (廣漢太守)
- In office ?–?
- Monarch: Liu Shan

Administrator of Wenshan (汶山太守)
- In office ?–?

Prefect of Pi County (郫縣令)
- In office ?–?

Prefect of Chengdu (成都令)
- In office ?–?

Assistant Officer Who Supervises the Army (督軍從事)
- In office ?–?

Personal details
- Born: Unknown Chengdu, Sichuan
- Died: Unknown (aged 47) Qianwei, Sichuan
- Occupation: Official
- Courtesy name: Junsu (君肅)

He Zhi (fl. 210s–220s) courtesy name Junsu, was an official of the state of Shu Han during the Three Kingdoms period of China.

== Life ==
He Zhi was born in Shu County, which is present-day Chengdu, Sichuan. He was from a poor family however as a youth, he was generous and would help others. He grew up to be a strong and imposing man. During his meals, he would greatly eat and drink. He was also known as extravagant, was fond of music and women, and would not exercise moderation in the things he liked. Because of this conduct, people didn't think highly of him. He would often dream of a mulberry tree growing out of a well and asked the meaning of this with the dream diviner Zhao Zhi (趙直). Zhao Zhi explained to him that seeing a mulberry tree growing out of a well is not something common but that mulberry tree may have some significance. He described to him that the word mulberry tree (桑) is composed of four "tens" (十) and a lower "eight" (八) hence he feared that his lifespan may not exceed this. He Zhi then laughed and answered that it was enough for him.

Later, he served as an official in the commandery and was soon promoted to Assistant Officer Who Supervises the Army (督軍從事). During this time, Zhuge Liang was very strict and conscientious about the application of the different laws. He was reported by private sources that He Zhi was indulging in games and travels, didn't take his duties seriously and went to the prison he managed. Everyone was fearful except He Zhi who remained calm. He Zhi soon heard about this and was informed of Zhuge Liang's imminent arrival. Therefore, he went from cells to cells, spoke with the prisoners and learned about their various situations. When at dawn, Zhuge Liang arrived. He Zhi knew perfectly about all the cases and answered with composure and clear explanations. Zhuge Liang was greatly impressed by him.

Thanks to this, he was promoted to serve as the Prefect of Chengdu (成都令), at the same time the position of Prefect of Pi County (郫縣令) was vacant and soon He Zhi was in charge of the two counties. Since both of these counties were very populous and close to the capital of the kingdom, there were many cases of corruption and treachery to resolve in comparison with the other counties. He Zhi would sleep longer than others but when he was awake and on duty, he would be quick to discover cases of duplicity and deceit hence all feared him. Among them, some believed that he used divinations in his procedure therefore they didn't dare to use treachery. He did have people help him with calculations, He Zhi would listen to them and be quick to reach an answer hence they had no dissent and were all in agreement. His expertise was as such.

The Yi Bu Qijiu Zhuan (虞翻別傳) mentions an anecdote between Yang Hong and He Zhi that when the court meeting started and He Zhi sat next to Yang Hong, the latter would tease him and ask him: "When his horse will gallop?" He Zhi's answer was: "If your former subordinate's horse does not dare to gallop, It is only because your excellency has not yet whipped it." Hearing this, everyone greatly laughed.

Before his arrival, there were many problems among the people of Wenshan and the minority tribes yet when He Zhi became the Administrator of Wenshan (汶山太守), they were quick to submit to his authority and trusted him. Later he was transferred to Guanghan and the tribes of Whenshan revolted claiming that only He Zhi's bright rule would appease them. Unfortunately, He Zhi was already occupied so they selected member of his family for the task and soon Wenshan was again secure.

He Zhi was famous for being an excellent doctor. During his tenure as the Administrator of Guanghan (廣漢太守), Zhang Ni heard of him and personally took a carriage to meet him and entrust He Zhi with a treatment that could cure his illness. He Zhi knew of Zhang Ni's reputation as a brave and generous man and did not spare any expense to cure him. Finally, after several years Zhang Ni's illness was cured. Both of them remained friends after this event.

Eventually, He Zhi was transferred to Qianwei. And like Zhao Zhi prophesied, he died at the age of 48 years old (by East Asian age reckoning).

== Wang Li ==
Wang Li (王離), whose courtesy name was Boyuan (伯元), was born in Guanghan Commandery (廣漢郡). He was known as a talented man with illustrious ability and graduated to Assistant Officer Who Supervises the Army. When he was in charge of the application of law, he would be fair and just and thanks to his behavior was promoted until he succeeded He Zhi as the Administrator of Qianwei (犍為太守). His governance was well received and worthy to be mentioned and although he did not match He Zhi's ability, his literary talent surpassed him. He had a son, Wang Changwen (王長文). (Note: Wang Changwen (王長文) has his own biography in Volume 11 of the Huayang Guo Zhi.)

== Appraisal ==
Chen Shou, in the Records of the Three Kingdoms (Sanguozhi), appraised He Zhi as "talented and full of shemes" which allowed him to render achievements. Chen Shou further stated that Zhuge Liang's employment of He Zhi along with Yang Hong allowed him to be famous in the western lands as someone who knew how to make use of the men of talent.

== See also ==
- Lists of people of the Three Kingdoms
