= Mei County =

Mei County 眉县
- County
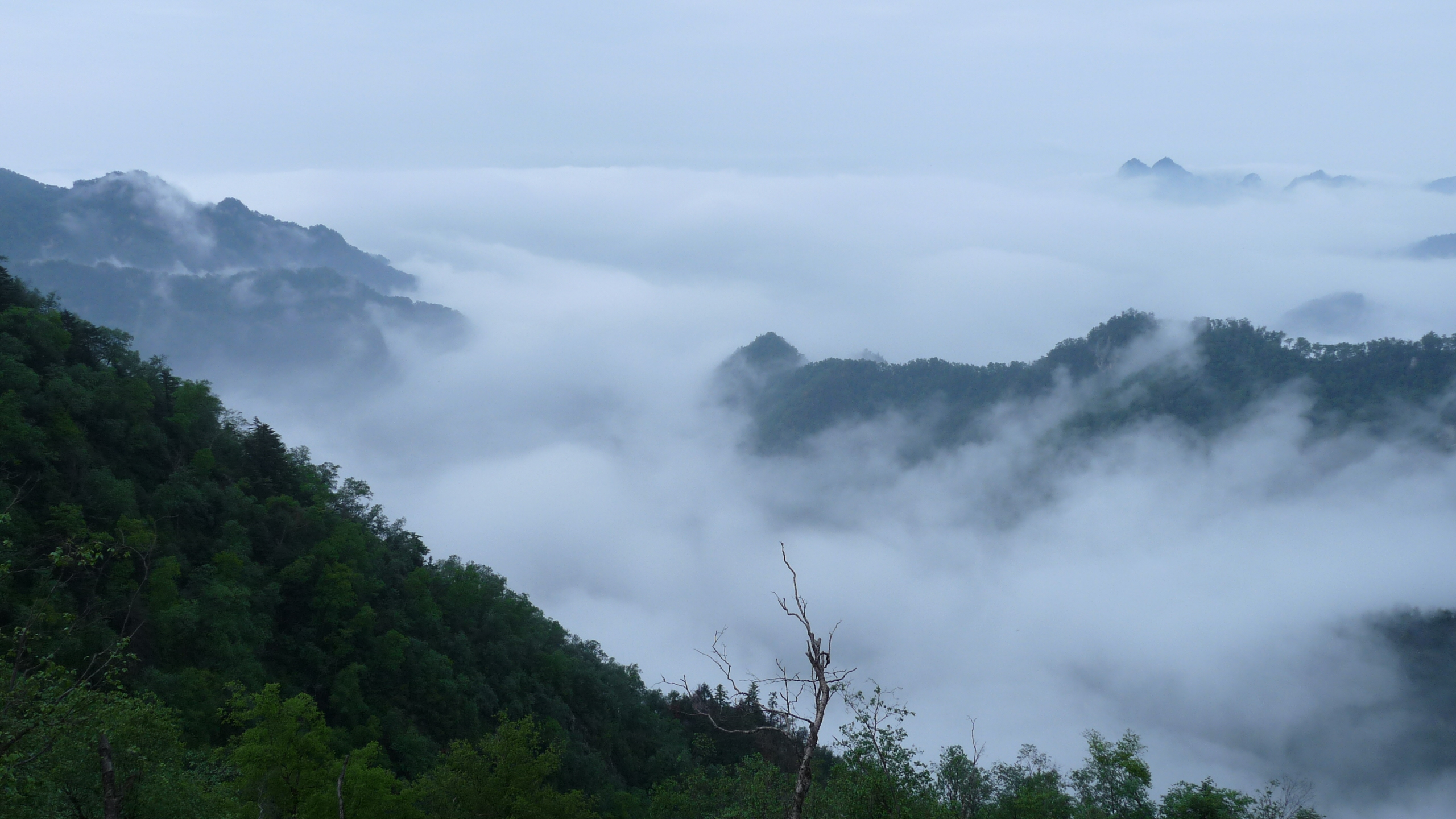

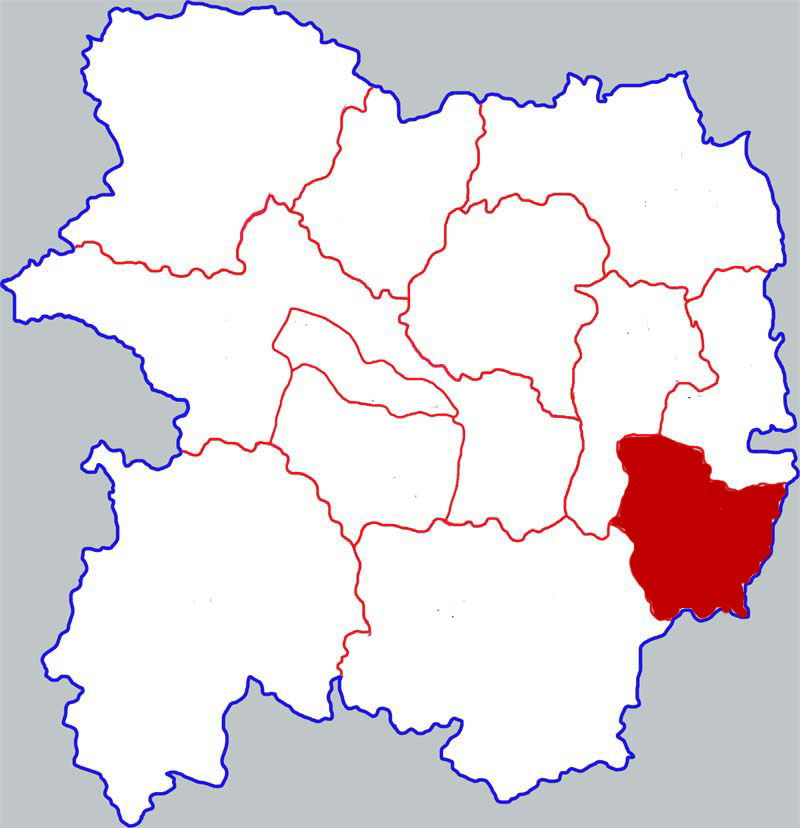
- Mei County in Baoji

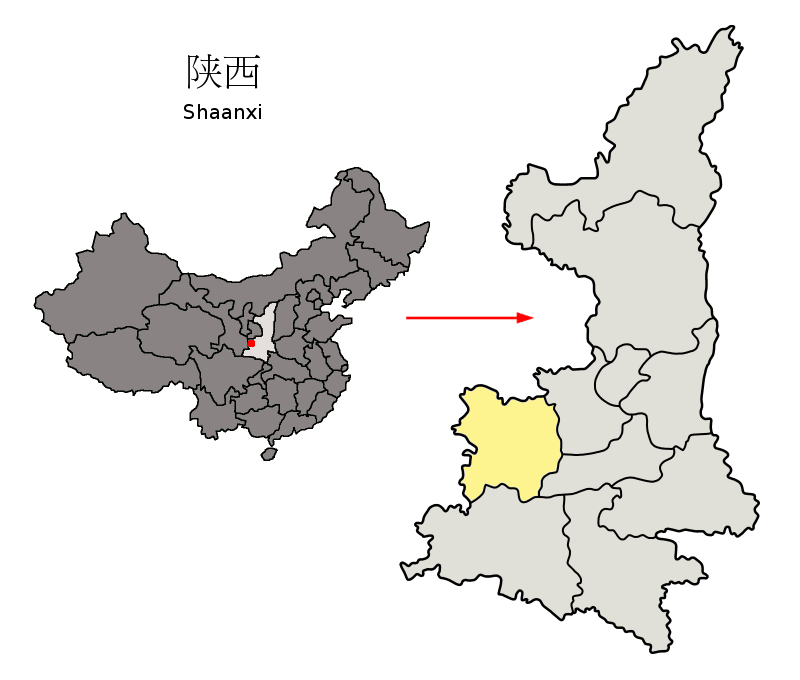
- Baoji in Shaanxi
- Coordinates (Mei County government): 34°16′29″N 107°45′00″E
- Country: People's Republic of China
- Province: Shaanxi
- Prefecture-level city: Baoji

Area
  - Total: 863 km^{2} (333 sq mi)
- Highest elevation (Mount Taibai sub peak): 3,771.2 m (12,373 ft)
- Lowest elevation (Wei River): 442 m (1,450 ft)

Population (2019)
  - Total: 324,608
  - Density: 376/km^{2} (974/sq mi)
- Time zone: UTC+8 (China Standard)
- Postal code: 722300

Mei County
- Traditional Chinese: 眉縣
- Simplified Chinese: 眉县
Transcriptions
Standard Mandarin
- Hanyu Pinyin: Méi Xiàn
Yue: Cantonese
- Jyutping: mei^{4}jyun^{2}

Name prior to 1986
- Traditional Chinese: 郿縣
- Simplified Chinese: 郿县
Transcriptions
Standard Mandarin
- Hanyu Pinyin: Méi Xiàn
Yue: Cantonese
- Jyutping: mei^{4}jyun^{2}

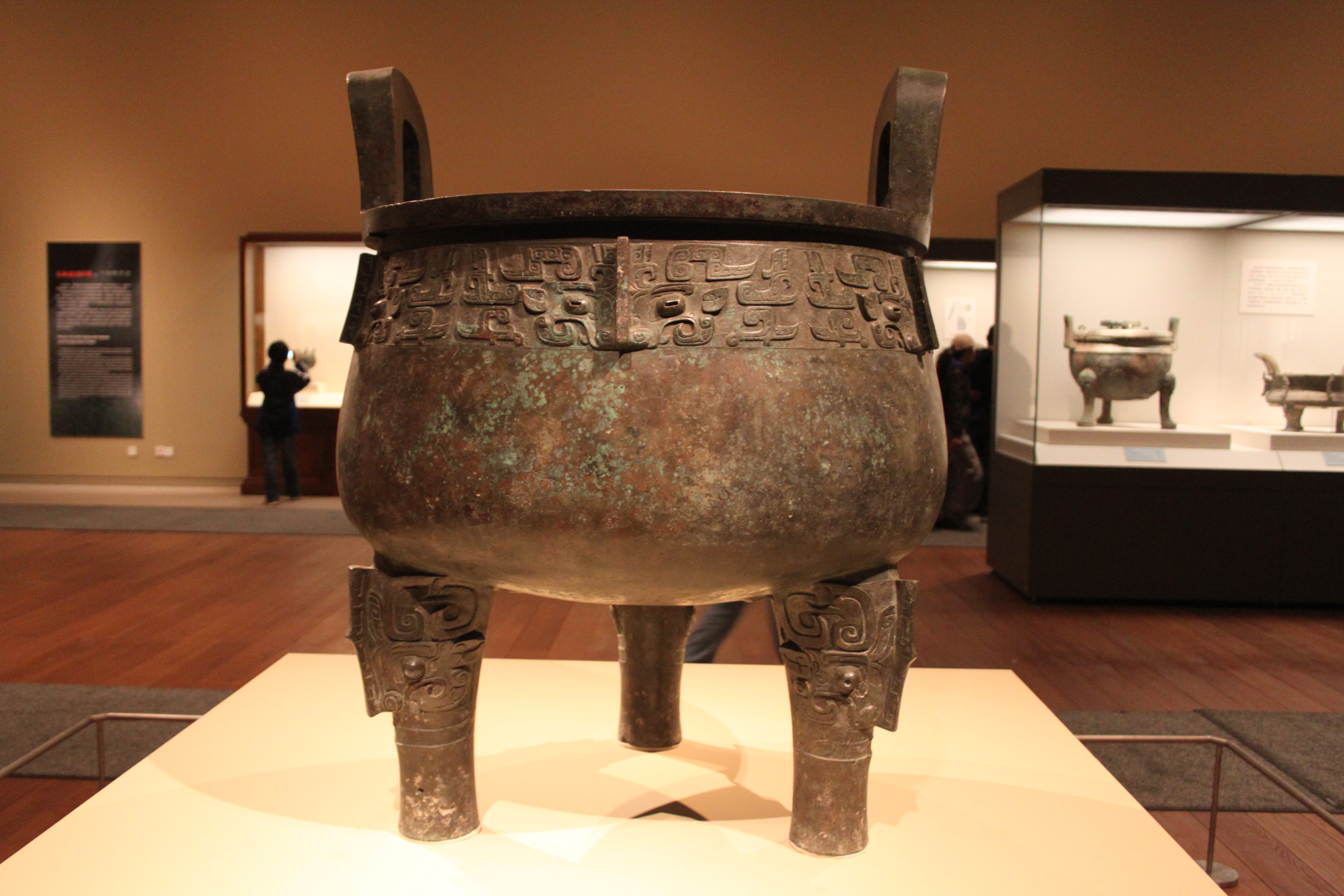
Western Zhou bronze ding found in Mei County

Mei County or Meixian (simplified Chinese: 眉县; traditional Chinese: 眉縣; pinyin: Méi Xiàn) is a county under the jurisdiction of the prefecture-level city of Baoji, in the west of Shaanxi province, China. It is one of the birthplaces of the Western Zhou culture, during which it was known as Taiguo (邰国). In 794 BC Duke Zhuang of Qin established a town known as Yiyi at its location. During the Eastern Han dynasty it became known as Yinwu. In 2003, 27 Zhou culture bronze ding vessels an other bronzeware were found in Lijia village of Mei County.

Nowadays Mei County is known for its kiwifruit cultivation and trout and carp aquaculture.

== Administrative divisions ==
As of 2020, this County is divided to 1 subdistrict, 7 towns and 2 others.

Subdistricts

- Shoushan Subdistrict (首善街道)

Towns

- Hengqu (横渠镇)
- Huaiya (槐芽镇)
- Tangyu (汤峪镇)
- Changxing (常兴镇)
- Jinqu (金渠镇)
- Yingtou (营头镇)
- Qi (齐镇)

Others

- Shaanxi Mount Taibai Scenic Area (陕西太白山风景区)
- Honghegu Forest Park (红河谷森林公园)

== Climate ==
Climate data for Meixian, elevation 491 m (1,611 ft), (1991–2020 normals, extremes 1981–present)
Month	Jan	Feb	Mar	Apr	May	Jun	Jul	Aug	Sep	Oct	Nov	Dec	Year
Record high °C (°F)	20.6 (69.1)	24.4 (75.9)	30.5 (86.9)	35.6 (96.1)	37.8 (100.0)	40.7 (105.3)	42.7 (108.9)	38.5 (101.3)	36.4 (97.5)	32.0 (89.6)	26.2 (79.2)	22.1 (71.8)	42.7 (108.9)
Mean daily maximum °C (°F)	5.6 (42.1)	9.5 (49.1)	15.3 (59.5)	21.7 (71.1)	26.3 (79.3)	30.7 (87.3)	31.8 (89.2)	29.5 (85.1)	24.5 (76.1)	19.0 (66.2)	12.9 (55.2)	7.0 (44.6)	19.5 (67.1)
Daily mean °C (°F)	−0.2 (31.6)	3.4 (38.1)	9.0 (48.2)	14.9 (58.8)	19.5 (67.1)	24.1 (75.4)	26.0 (78.8)	24.2 (75.6)	19.2 (66.6)	13.3 (55.9)	6.7 (44.1)	1.1 (34.0)	13.4 (56.2)
Mean daily minimum °C (°F)	−4.0 (24.8)	−0.9 (30.4)	4.1 (39.4)	9.3 (48.7)	13.9 (57.0)	18.4 (65.1)	21.3 (70.3)	20.3 (68.5)	15.5 (59.9)	9.6 (49.3)	2.5 (36.5)	−2.9 (26.8)	8.9 (48.1)
Record low °C (°F)	−13.4 (7.9)	−10.2 (13.6)	−6.8 (19.8)	−1.7 (28.9)	2.8 (37.0)	9.4 (48.9)	14.2 (57.6)	11.4 (52.5)	5.6 (42.1)	−3.0 (26.6)	−9.0 (15.8)	−16.1 (3.0)	−16.1 (3.0)
Average precipitation mm (inches)	5.2 (0.20)	9.2 (0.36)	25.0 (0.98)	39.6 (1.56)	59.9 (2.36)	69.5 (2.74)	82.8 (3.26)	102.0 (4.02)	109.0 (4.29)	55.5 (2.19)	17.8 (0.70)	3.8 (0.15)	579.3 (22.81)
Average precipitation days (≥ 0.1 mm)	3.7	4.2	6.8	7.2	10.0	9.1	10.2	10.7	12.8	10.4	5.8	2.7	93.6
Average snowy days	4.7	3.0	1.4	0.1	0	0	0	0	0	0	1.0	2.7	12.9
Average relative humidity (%)	65	65	64	67	68	67	73	79	83	81	76	68	71
Mean monthly sunshine hours	133.7	127.5	164.4	190.2	201.8	195.6	191.4	159.3	122.7	124.9	133.1	138.8	1,883.4
Percentage possible sunshine	42	41	44	48	47	45	44	39	34	36	43	45	42
Source: China Meteorological Administration all-time extreme temperature
