= Lady Liu (Yuan Shao) =

3rd-century Chinese Late Han noble woman

Lady Liu 劉夫人
- Born: Unknown
- Died: Unknown
- Spouse: Yuan Shao
- Children: Yuan Shang

Lady Liu (劉夫人) was a Chinese noblewoman who lived during the Han dynasty. She was a concubine of Yuan Shao, the Grand Administrator of Bohai. She was also the mother of Yuan Shang, third son and successor of Yuan Shao. After Yuan Shao's death, she succeeded him as the de facto leader. She is best known for starting a conspiracy against members of the Yuan family and plotting the murder of Yuan Shao's five concubines so that her son would become the family's sole heir.

== Life ==
Lady Liu's early life is not known in historical records. She is mentioned in the Book of the Later Han (後漢書) and the historical novel Romance of the Three Kingdoms which romanticizes the events before and during the period of the Three Kingdoms in ancient China. Lady Liu married Yuan Shao, a prominent warlord. She later gave birth to Yuan Shang, Yuan Shao's third child and eventually his successor. Lady Liu also adopted Yuan Xi, Yuan Shao's second son.

She is described in the Records of the Three Kingdoms as a wicked, jealous, violent and rebellious woman. Lady Liu maintained a relatively friendly relationship with her biological and adopted sons, while fighting with Yuan Shao's other concubines and first son, Yuan Tan.

Yuan Xi was the first husband of Lady Zhen, a noblewoman who later married Cao Pi, the first ruler of the state of Cao Wei. Yuan Xi was in charge of You Province, so Yuan Xi travelled to the province to assume his appointment. Lady Zhen did not follow her husband there but remained in Ye (in present-day Handan, Hebei), the administrative centre of Yuan Shao's domain, to take care of Lady Liu.

Between 191 and 199, the Yuan clan unified much of northeastern China. Yuan Shao consolidated his hold on Ji and Qing provinces. In early 199, Yuan Shao had decisively defeated Gongsun Zan at the Battle of Yijing and held absolute power over the four provinces north of the Yellow River. After establishing an alliance with the Wuhuan tribes on the northern border, Yuan Shao turned his attention to Cao Cao, who had consolidated his own power base south of the Yellow River.

== Campaign of Guandu ==
In September 200, the Guandu campaign began, a decisive battle between Cao Cao and Yuan Shao who were former brothers-in-arms. Initially Yuan Shao had a big advantage, boasting over 100,000 soldiers, so that Cao Cao's forces were greatly outnumbered. Due to Cao Cao's strategies and the discontent of Yuan Shao's generals, many commanders defected to serve Cao Cao in battle thus leading to Yuan Shao's defeat. During the Battle of Guandu, Lady Liu remained safe in Ye. She was not in any kind of danger there until Cao Cao captured the city four years later. In 201, Cao Cao defeated Yuan Shao again at the Battle of Cangting and proceeded to capture several of Yuan's territories in Ji Province.

== Lady Liu's plot ==
After the Battle of Cagting, Yuan Shao became ill due to exhaustion. Yuan Shao had three sons, and he favoured his third son, Yuan Shang, due to his good looks. Yet he remained undecided between Yuan Tan and Yuan Shang as to his choice for succession. Yuan never made a formal decision on succession before he died in on 28 June 202, leaving his domain to be contested by his sons and Cao Cao.

It was during this internal crisis created by the conflict over succession that Lady Liu entered the scene. Being in control of the Yuan family after her husband's death, she plotted with Shen Pei and Pang Ji, two influential advisors to execute Yuan Shao's concubines. Lady Li's plans were put into effect, with the five 5 concubines of her late husband being executed and then disfigured.

Lady Liu, concerned about the repercussions this incident would cause, planned to kill all who opposed her plans. She was responsible for killing the entire families of these concubines to prevent them from seeking revenge in the future. Her plotting bore fruit when her son Yuan Shang succeeded to the Yuan clan leadership. By the time Yuan Tan returned to the capital, he could not reverse the situation; the only thing he could do was proclaim himself "General of Carriages and Cavalry" (車騎 將軍), a former title of his father's.

== Battle of Ye ==
After Yuan Shang succeeded to the leadership of the Yuan family, Cao Cao took advantage of the turmoil caused by the internal intrigues to invade the Yuan brothers' domains. A series of battles took place between the years 202 and 207. Yuan Shang and Yuan Tan were victorious in the Battle of Liyang in 202. Later in 204, Cao Cao invaded Ye, the city where Lady Liu's residence was located. Cao Cao defeated Yuan Shang at the Battle of Ye and his forces occupied the city. Cao Cao's son, Cao Pi, went to Lady Liu's residence and met her and Lady Zhen. Lady Zhen was so terrified that she buried her face in Lady Liu's lap. Cao Pi said, "What's going on, Madam Liu? Ask that lady to lift up her head!" Cao Pi was very impressed and entranced by Lady Zhen's beauty when he saw her. His father later allowed him to marry her. Another account of this incident stated that Lady Liu and Lady Zhen were in Yuan Shang's residence when Cao Pi entered. Lady Zhen's hair was dishevelled and she was crying behind her mother-in-law. When Cao Pi asked, Lady Liu told him the woman behind her was Yuan Xi's wife. Cao Pi was so entranced by Lady Zhen's beauty that he later married her and treated her well.

Lady Liu and Lady Zhen were spared death. Cao Cao gave Lady Liu all of Yuan Shao's personal belongings that he had collected after Guandu and provided her with a pension for the rest of her life.

== In Romance of the Three Kingdoms ==
Lady Liu first appears in Chapter 32 of the novel where she sends for Shen Pei and Pang Ji during Yuan Shao's final moments. After mourning his death, she has five of his concubines slain and their corpses mutilated beyond recognition. Her son followed suit by executing the relatives of these concubines to prevent them from avenging their dead kin. Afterwards, she and Lady Zhen find refuge in the palace of the Yuans before being discovered by Cao Pi. Attracted by Lady Zhen's beauty, he decides against killing the women and places her under his care. In the novel it is not explained what happens to Lady Liu after the incident.
