= Battle of Cangting =

Battle between warlords Yuan Shao and Cao Cao (201)

- Part of the Guandu campaign
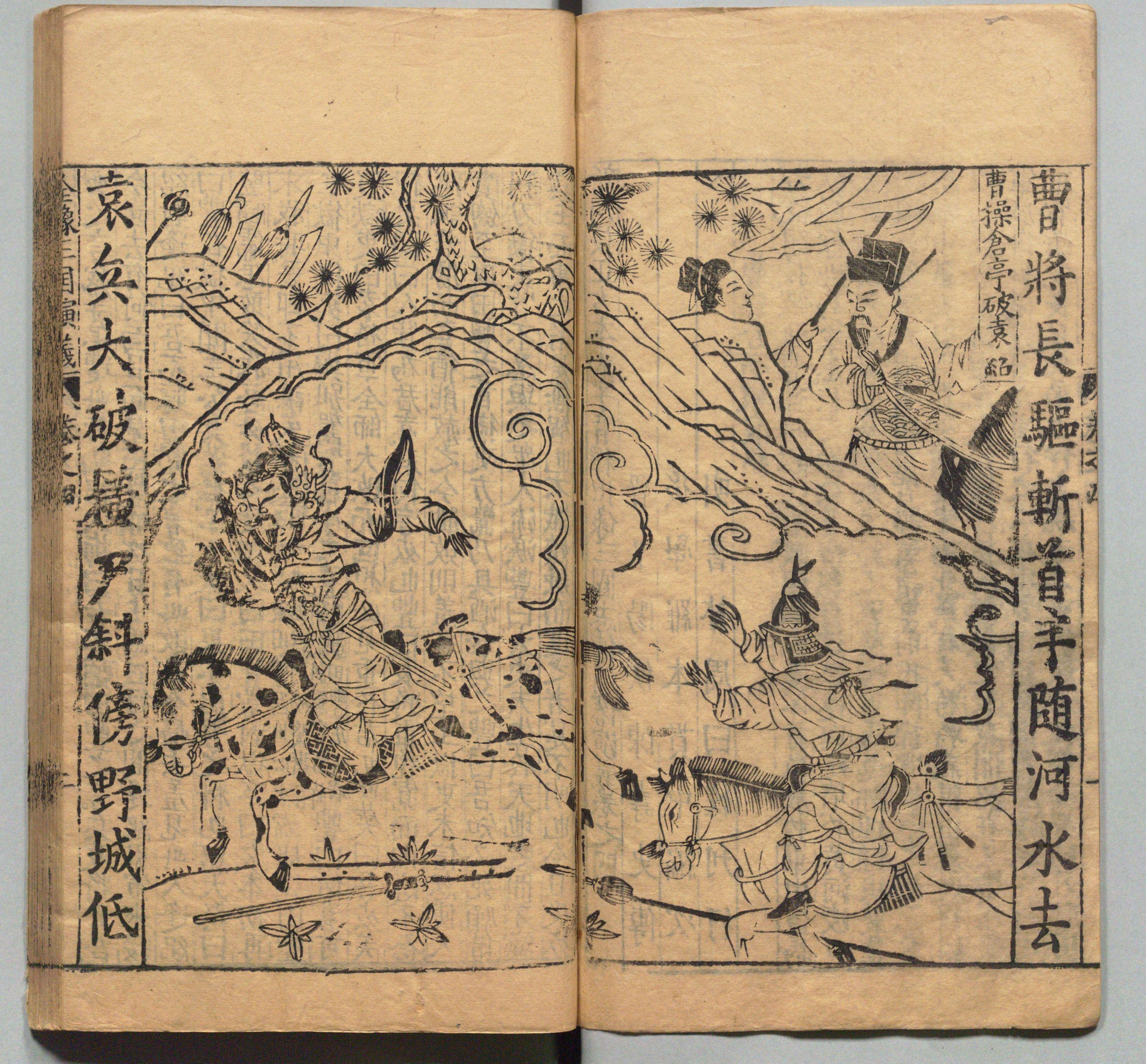
- Cao Cao defeats Yuan Shao at Cangting, as illustrated in a 1591 edition of the novel Romance of the Three Kingdoms
| Date | c. May – June 201 |
| Location | North of present-day Yanggu County, Shandong, China |
| Result | Cao Cao victory |

Belligerents
| Cao Cao | Yuan Shao |

Commanders and leaders
| Cao Cao | |

Battle of Cangting
- Traditional Chinese: 倉亭之戰
- Simplified Chinese: 仓亭之战
Transcriptions
Standard Mandarin
- Hanyu Pinyin: Cāngtíng zhī zhàn

The Battle of Cangting was part of a mop-up operation undertaken by the warlord Cao Cao after his victory over his rival Yuan Shao at the Battle of Guandu in 200 in the late Eastern Han dynasty of China. The battle was also mentioned in the 14th-century historical novel Romance of the Three Kingdoms as the final clash between the forces of Yuan Shao and Cao Cao before Yuan Shao died.

== The battle ==
After Yuan Shao's defeat at Guandu, many cities within his territory north of the Yellow River rebelled and switched allegiance to Cao Cao. Despite this, Cao Cao's forces were too exhausted from the strain of battle to take advantage of the situation. Yuan Shao still retained a presence south of the river at Cangting (倉亭; north of present-day Yanggu County, Shandong), a lone bridgehead down the river east from the battlefields of Guandu.

Cao Cao had originally wanted to follow up his victory over Yuan Shao by turning south to attack Liu Biao and Sun Quan, the latter who had newly inherited his domain from his deceased brother Sun Ce. Cao Cao's strategist Xun Yu cautioned against such action, reasoning that Cao Cao should take the opportunity to settle the matter with Yuan Shao, who was now facing internal turmoil after his recent defeat. Xun Yu also realized the danger of turning the focus to the south at such a time, since the remnants of Yuan Shao's men might band up and attack Cao Cao's rear. Cao Cao then gave up on the idea and continued the campaign against Yuan Shao.

Cao Cao went to collect grain from Anmin (安民; southeast of present-day Dongping County, Shandong). This position was well to the east of his former defences at Guandu, as well as near to Yuan Shao's position at Cangting. Cao Cao may have been drawing supplies from far afield to mount an attack across the river, but the amount he gathered was no match for Yuan Shao's resources north of the river. In May or June 201, Cao Cao drew up his troops from upriver to attack Yuan Shao's men at Cangting and defeated them. With this battle, Yuan Shao's last units south of the river were eliminated.

Afterwards, Cao Cao returned to his base in the capital Xu City in October or November 201 to give his troops a few months of needed rest. Yuan Shao was able to regather his defeated armies to settle the rebellions in his own domain, soon reestablishing order and restored the status quo ante. In June 202, Yuan Shao died in illness and agony over his defeat, leaving his domain to be contested by his sons and a looming Cao Cao.

== In Romance of the Three Kingdoms ==
In Chapter 31 of the 14th-century historical novel Romance of the Three Kingdoms, the scarcely recorded Battle of Cangting was elaborated on and given new light. It became the last battle that Yuan Shao personally commanded, in which he also brought all his sons along. The battle also provided Cao Cao's adviser Cheng Yu with an opportunity to show off his skills of ambuscade.

After his defeat at Guandu, Yuan Shao became dispirited and uninterested in politics. That was until his eldest son Yuan Tan brought 50,000 men from Qing Province, second son Yuan Xi brought 60,000 men from You Province, and nephew Gao Gan brought 50,000 from Bing Province. Yuan Shao prepared to face Cao Cao again after assembling the new reinforcements, and brought the total of some 300,000 men to camp at Cangting. Cao Cao marched his force nearby and faced the challenge.

The next day, the two armies arrayed themselves against each other. Yuan Shao's youngest son Yuan Shang rode out to seek a duel to impress his father. Xu Huang's subordinate Shi Huan (史渙) challenged Yuan Shang, but was shot in the left eye and died. Seeing that his son had won the duel, Yuan Shao directed his armies to charge and the two armies battled. At night, Cao Cao held a conference to discuss the battle plan, and it was then Cheng Yu presented his "ambush from ten sides" (十面埋伏) strategy. He suggested that Cao Cao retreat to the riverbank and leave ten brigades in ambush, and lure Yuan Shao's men to the river. Cao Cao accepted and set the plan in motion.

At midnight the following day, Cao Cao sent Xu Chu to pretend to launch a raid on Yuan Shao's camp. Yuan Shao's men responded to the bait and gave chase until Cao Cao's men reached the river. With retreat out of the question, Cao Cao's men turned around and fought to the death, bringing chaos to Yuan Shao's army, who had to turn back after facing such stiff resistance. It was then Xiahou Yuan and Gao Lan emerged from their ambush to block Yuan's way. The Yuans broke through, but then Yue Jin and Yu Jin appeared before them, followed by Li Dian and Xu Huang. With much casualties, the Yuans made their way back to their camp and prepared for a meal. Just then, Zhang Liao and Zhang He came out of ambush and attacked the camp. Yuan Shao hurried mounted his horse and fled toward Cangting, with Cao Cao's main army in pursuit. Finally, Cao Hong and Xiahou Dun appeared before him, and the desperate Yuan Shao had to fight his way out.

After the battle, all of Yuan Shao's warhorses were dead, corpses piled across the fields, and blood flowed like creeks. Yuan Xi and Gao Gan were wounded by arrows, and once together, Yuan Shao hugged his three sons and cried. Soon afterwards, he fainted and spat blood ceaselessly. In anguish, he said, "I have campaigned on several occasions, never have I suffered like today! Heaven dooms me! You [sons] shall return to your home provinces and promise to settle matters with Cao once and for all!"
