= Li Dian =

Chinese military general (c.180 – c.217)

- 李典

General Who Destroys Barbarians (破虜將軍) (under Cao Cao)
- In office ?–?
- Monarch: Emperor Xian of Han

General Who Captures Barbarians (捕虜將軍) (under Cao Cao)
- In office ?–?
- Monarch: Emperor Xian of Han

Major-General (裨將軍) (under Cao Cao)
- In office ?–?
- Monarch: Emperor Xian of Han

Personal details
- Born: Unknown; Juye County, Shandong
- Died: Unknown
- Relations: Li Qian (uncle)
- Children: Li Zhen; at least one other son
- Occupation: General
- Courtesy name: Mancheng (曼成)
- Posthumous name: Marquis Min (愍侯)
- Peerage: Marquis of a Chief Village (都亭侯)

Li Dian (c. 180 – c. 217), courtesy name Mancheng, was a Chinese military general and politician serving under the warlord Cao Cao during the late Eastern Han dynasty of China. He participated in the Battle of Guandu in 200 between Cao Cao and Yuan Shao. He also played a significant role in the defence of Hefei during the Battle of Xiaoyao Ford of 214–215 against the forces of Sun Quan.

== Early life and career ==
Li Dian was from Juye County (鉅野縣), Shanyang Commandery (山陽郡), which is in present-day Juye County, Shandong. His uncle, Li Qian (李乾), was an influential man in the region and had thousands of retainers working under him in Chengshi County (乘氏縣; east of present-day Heze, Shandong).

During the Chuping era (190–193) in the reign of Emperor Xian of the Eastern Han dynasty, Li Qian and Li Dian led their followers to assist the warlord Cao Cao in suppressing the Yellow Turban Rebellion and they defeated the rebels at Shouzhang County (壽張縣; south of present-day Dongping County, Shandong). Li Dian and his uncle later followed Cao Cao in his campaigns against rival warlords such as Yuan Shu and Tao Qian. When conflict broke out between Cao Cao and Lü Bu in 194, Cao sent Li Qian back to Chengshi County to reaffirm the support of the locals towards him. Lü Bu's subordinates Xue Lan (薛蘭) and Li Feng (李封) tried to persuade Li Qian to defect to their side but Li Qian refused so they killed him. Cao Cao then gave command of Li Qian's troops to Li Qian's son, Li Zheng (李整), and sent some of his men to assist Li Zheng to attack Xue Lan and Li Feng. Li Zheng achieved victory over Xue Lan and Li Feng, and later helped to pacify the various counties in Yan Province. He was appointed as the Inspector (刺史) of Qing Province.

After Li Zheng's death, Li Dian was appointed as the Prefect (令) of Yingyin County (潁陰縣; in present-day Xuchang, Henan) and General of the Household (中郎將), and took over command of his cousin's troops. Li Dian was known to be very studious since he was a youth, and he showed little interest in military affairs. He read classics such as the Spring and Autumn Annals and the Zuo Zhuan. Cao Cao was pleased with Li Dian and wanted to test his abilities. He reassigned Li Dian to be the Administrator (太守) of Lihu Commandery (離狐郡; southeast of present-day Dongming, Shandong), where Li was primarily in charge of managing civil affairs.

== Cao Cao's campaigns against Yuan Shao and the Yuan brothers ==
In 200, when the forces of Cao Cao and Yuan Shao clashed at the Battle of Guandu, Li Dian, along with his clansmen and subordinates, took charge of supplying Cao's forces at the frontline with food and equipment. After Yuan Shao was defeated, Cao Cao appointed Li Dian as a Major-General (裨將軍) and ordered him to garrison at Anmin (安民).

Yuan Shao died in 202, after which his sons Yuan Tan and Yuan Shang started fighting over their father's territories. During the Battle of Liyang of 202–203 against the Yuan brothers, Cao Cao put Li Dian and Cheng Yu in charge of escorting food supplies to the frontline by crossing the Yellow River. Yuan Shang sent his subordinate Gao Fan (高蕃) to station near the river bank to block Cao Cao's supply route. Cao Cao had instructed Li Dian and Cheng Yu to send the supplies by land if they could not cross the river. However, Li Dian gathered his men and told them, "Gao Fan's troops are lightly armoured and they block the water route. This shows that they are lax, so they can be overcome easily. The military does not act against orders, but they can make their own decisions if they feel they are doing something beneficial to the country. Let's take them out quickly." Cheng Yu agreed with Li Dian, so they led their forces across the river to attack Gao Fan and defeated the enemy, thus securing the supply route across the river.

In 204, after the Battle of Ye against Yuan Shang's forces, Cao Cao sent Li Dian and Yue Jin to attack Yuan Shang's cousin and ally, Gao Gan, at Hu Pass (壺關; present-day Huguan County, Shanxi). Li Dian defeated Guan Cheng (管承) at Changguang County (長廣縣; east of present-day Laiyang, Shandong), and was promoted to General Who Captures Barbarians (捕虜將軍) and made a Marquis of a Chief Village (都亭侯) for his achievements.

== Battle of Bowang ==
In 202, Jing Province's governor, Liu Biao, sent Liu Bei north to attack Cao Cao when Cao was away on his campaigns in northern China. Cao Cao sent Xiahou Dun and Li Dian to lead an army to resist Liu Bei's forces. Liu Bei burnt his supplies and pretended to retreat. When Xiahou Dun wanted to pursue Liu Bei, Li Dian cautioned him, "There must be an ambush because the enemy is retreating for no reason. The roads to the south are narrow and the vegetation is very dense. We shouldn't pursue the enemy." Xiahou Dun ignored Li Dian's warning and went off in pursuit of Liu Bei together with Yu Jin, while Li Dian remained behind. As Li Dian expected, Xiahou Dun and his men did fall into Liu Bei's ambush later but Li showed up with the remaining troops and rescued them. Liu Bei retreated when he saw that Li Dian's reinforcements had arrived.

== Relocation of clansmen and close followers ==
Li Dian had over 3,000 families in his clansmen and close followers, all of whom lived in Chengshi County (乘氏縣; east of present-day Heze, Shandong). He proposed to Cao Cao to have them relocated to Wei Commandery (魏郡; north of present-day Ci County, Hebei), Cao Cao's base of operations during his campaigns in northern China. Cao Cao laughed and asked Li Dian, "You admire Geng Chun (Note: Geng Chun (耿純) was one of the Yuntai 28 generals (雲台二十八將) who served under Liu Xiu (Emperor Guangwu), who restored the Han dynasty (as the Eastern Han dynasty) after Wang Mang's usurpation. In 23 CE, Geng Chun led over 2,000 families, comprising his clansmen and close associates, to join Liu Xiu in Handan, Hebei.) and wish to emulate him, don't you?" Li Dian replied, "I'm humble and timid and my contributions are lowly, but the rewards I've received are too high, so I should have my entire clan join me in service so that I'll feel more deserving of the rewards. Besides, the chaos haven't ended yet, so it's better to keep them close to better control the Empire. I'm not emulating Geng Chun." Li Dian's clansmen and close followers were then relocated to Ye (鄴; in present-day Handan, Hebei). Cao Cao was pleased and he promoted Li Dian to General Who Destroys Barbarians (破虜將軍).

== Battle of Xiaoyao Ford ==
After the Battle of Jiangling in 209, Cao Cao left Li Dian, Zhang Liao and Yue Jin to defend Hefei, a strategic location at the border between Cao Cao and Sun Quan's territories. Around 214, when Sun Quan led his forces to attack Hefei, Zhang Liao wanted to lead their troops out of the city to resist the enemy. However, Zhang Liao was aware that the three of them could not get along with each other and he was worried that they would not comply with his orders. Zhang Liao said, "Our lord is away at war. By the time his reinforcements reach here, we're already done for. So he's actually instructing us to take advantage of the situation, when the enemy has just arrived and not fully gathered yet, to attack them and devastate their morale so as to calm our men and strengthen our defences. Victory or defeat, it all depends on this battle. Why are the two of you still hesitating?" Li Dian was moved and he said, "This is a national crisis. We'll see how your strategy works out. How can I allow my personal issues take precedence over my official duties?" Zhang Liao, Li Dian and Yue Jin then worked together and succeeded in defeating and driving away Sun Quan's much larger army. Li Dian was rewarded with an additional 100 taxable households in his marquisate, bringing the total number of households to 300.

== Death ==
Li Dian's biography in the Sanguozhi did not state when and how he died, but it is known that he died at the age of 36 (by East Asian age reckoning). His titles were inherited by his son, Li Zhen (李禎).

In 220, after Cao Pi (Cao Cao's son and successor) forced Emperor Xian to abdicate the throne to him and became the emperor of the state of Cao Wei, he awarded Li Dian the posthumous title "Marquis Min" (愍侯), which literally means "sympathetic marquis", in recognition of Li's merits at the Battle of Xiaoyao Ford. (Note: According to the "Rules of assigning posthumous names" chapter in the Yizhoushu, an official would receive the posthumous name "Min" for either one of the following criteria: being killed while serving the country; letting civilians be harmed; being belittled (or sick) for a long time; being involved in a coup d'etat (or rebellion). Li Dian's cause of death remains unknown but he was probably fatally wounded in battle as deduced from his posthumous name. Another of Cao Cao's generals, Xiahou Yuan, who was killed in action during the Hanzhong Campaign, also shared this posthumous name.) Li Zhen was awarded another 100 taxable households in his marquisate, while another of Li Dian's sons received the title of a Secondary Marquis and 100 taxable households.

== Appraisal ==
Li Dian's biography in the Sanguozhi mentioned that Li was known to be a keen and humble learner who respected the literati. He did not fight with others for merits, and he regarded official duties as more important than his personal affairs. Chen Shou, who wrote Li Dian's biography, praised Li for his noble and gentlemanly demeanour, and for his 'duty before self' attitude.

== In popular culture ==
Li Dian is first introduced as a playable character in the eighth instalment of Koei's Dynasty Warriors video game series.

== See also ==
- Lists of people of the Three Kingdoms
