= Zhou Bi =

Late 2nd-century Han dynasty official

Zhou Bi (pinyin: Zhōu Bì; 周毖, or 周珌; died 2 April 190) was an official of the Eastern Han dynasty. He was the son of Zhou Shen (周慎).

He was mentioned in the biographies of Emperor Xian, Dong Zhuo and Yuan Shao in the Book of Later Han, and the biographies of Yuan Shao and Xu Jing in the Records of the Three Kingdoms.

== Life ==
His place of birth is uncertain; it was recorded as Hanyang (漢陽郡) in Xu Jing's biography in the Records of the Three Kingdoms, and Wuwei (武威郡) in Dong Zhuo's biography in the Book of Later Han.

When Dong Zhuo seized the power in September 189, Zhou Bi had Dong Zhuo's full confidence. Shortly after, Yuan Shao left the capital, laying down his public office. Zhou Bi, then Palace Attendant, joined the Colonel of the City Gates Wu Qiong and He Yong in jointly advising Dong Zhuo to appease the rage of Yuan Shao by appointing Yuan Shao as the Administrator of Bohai Commandery). In fact, Zhou Bi and Wu Qiong were secretly in league with Yuan Shao.

Afterwards, he was made Minister of Civil Service Affairs (吏部尚書), and he, along with Wu Qiong, He Yong, Zheng Tai and Xu Jing took part in the personnel policy division of the Dong Zhuo's administration by Dong Zhuo's orders, and they appointed Xun Shuang, Han Rong, Han Fu, Kong Zhou, Zhang Miao, Liu Dai and Chen Ji, Zhang Zi and others to public offices.

In January 190, as Yuan Shao and Zhang Mao raised an army and began a campaign against Dong Zhuo, Dong Zhuo thought out a plan to move the capital to Changan. Zhou Bi, then titled Colonel Who Inspects the Army (督軍校尉), along with Wu Qiong, Huang Wan and Yang Biao, opposed the Dong Zhuo's plan.

In April 190, Dong Zhuo executed Zhou Bi and Wu Qiong, citing the reason that most figures who were appointed by them defected to the anti-Dong Zhuo forces.
