= Battle of Dushi Ford =

Battle between warlords Cao Cao and Yuan Shao (200)

- Part of the Guandu campaign
Date	3 February – 2 March 200
Location	Along Yellow River, Henan
Result	Cao Cao victory

Belligerents
Yuan Shao	Cao Cao

Commanders and leaders
Yuan Shao; He Mao (surrendered); Wang Mo (surrendered)	Yu Jin; Yue Jin

Strength
At least 4,000	5,000

Casualties and losses
Several thousand	(Unknown)

Battle of Dushi Ford
- Traditional Chinese: 杜氏津之戰
- Simplified Chinese: 杜氏津之战
Transcriptions
Standard Mandarin
- Hanyu Pinyin: Dùshìjīn Zhī Zhàn

The Battle of Dushi Ford was fought between the warlords Cao Cao and Yuan Shao between 3 February and 2 March 200 in the late Eastern Han dynasty. In the battle, Yuan Shao launched an attack on Cao Cao's position on the southern bank of the Yellow River, taking advantage of Cao's temporary absence. In response, Cao Cao's general Yu Jin raided Yuan Shao's encampments in the vicinity of present-day Henan, ultimately discouraging Yuan from making a determined attack.

== Background ==
By the end of the 190s, northern China was divided between two contending warlords, Yuan Shao and Cao Cao. Each had assimilated the smaller powers around them and made political arrangements with the larger powers elsewhere, and were increasingly looking at each other for potential gains. Cao Cao had earlier secured the helpless Emperor Xian into his custody, a move that Yuan Shao regretted not to have made. After the successful conquest of Gongsun Zan's territories to the north, Yuan Shao turned to the south to prepare for an assault on Cao Cao in the summer of 199. In response, Cao Cao went on a patrol to the northern front and dispatched several armies to defend positions on the south side of the Yellow River between September 8 and October 7, 199. Among these was the placement of Yu Jin at Yan Ford (延津; north of present-day Yanjin County, Henan) with 2,000 troops. This position blocked Yuan Shao's direct approach over the ford toward Cao Cao's main defense lines at Guandu (官渡; northeast of present-day Zhongmu County, Henan).

After his patrol of the front, Cao Cao returned to the capital at Xu City and made further preparations for the future confrontation with Yuan Shao at Guandu. At this time, Yuan Shu, Yuan Shao's cousin who had declared himself "Son of Heaven", turned over his claim to the throne to Yuan Shao and made his way across Cao Cao's territory to reach Yuan Shao's son Yuan Tan in Qing Province. Cao Cao sent Liu Bei and Zhu Ling to block Yuan Shu from getting through, and they succeeded, leaving Yuan Shu to die in infamy between July and early August 199. Liu Bei, however, did not return from this campaign and settled his men in Xu Province in open rebellion. Cao Cao was determined to eliminate Liu Bei before his forces could accumulate, but Cao Cao's generals remonstrated against any immediate action against Liu Bei, fearing that Yuan Shao might exploit the opportunity to attack Xu City when Cao Cao was away attacking the east. Cao Cao and his strategist Guo Jia disagreed with the generals, saying that Liu Bei would become troublesome if not dealt with immediately, and Yuan Shao would be too slow and indecisive to make a move in time. Cao Cao went ahead with his plan and attacked Liu Bei personally in Xu Province.

Tian Feng, the aide-de-camp in Yuan Shao's Ji Province, urged Yuan Shao to grasp this opportunity to mount an attack on Cao Cao's rear, but Yuan excused himself on the grounds that one of his sons was sick. Tian Feng, in dismay, struck the ground with his staff and said: "Alas, in the critical moment he throws away opportunity for the sake of a sick child. The pity of it, the chance is lost." However, that is not to say that Yuan Shao did not attempt to make use of Cao Cao's temporary absence.

== The battle ==
Yuan Shao, using a great deal less than his main strength, attacked Yu Jin's position at Yan Ford in a probing action. Yu Jin held his ground firmly and Yuan Shao could not take him, thus the possibility of a rear attack of Xu City was thrashed. To follow up, Yu Jin joined up with Yue Jin, who had just been sent back after helping defect Liu Bei's forces, and raided Yuan Shao's detached encampments along the Yellow River southwest from Yan Ford with 5,000 infantry and cavalry. They raided up as far as Ji (汲; 25 li southwest of present-day Weihui, Henan), and crossed the river to raid Huojia (獲嘉; southeast of present-day Huojia, Henan) to the north. (Note: At the time, the river flowed south of Huojia, thus Huojia was on the north bank of the river.) In all, they had set fire to some 30 enemy camps, decapitated several thousand, captured several thousand men alive, and forced the surrender of some 20 generals including He Mao (何茂) and Wang Mo (王摩).

Cao Cao then ordered Yu Jin to camp at Yuanwu (原武; present-day Yuanyang County, Henan), where he attacked and crushed Yuan Shao's detached encampment at Dushi Ford (杜氏津), at the extreme flank of Cao Cao's position in Henan. Yu Jin was then promoted to Major-General, and he returned to Guandu accompanying Cao Cao, who returned from his successful campaign against Liu Bei in Xu Province. Liu Bei's troops other than Guan Yu, who had been captured by Cao Cao's forces, had fled north and would join Yuan Shao to aid in later battles against Cao Cao.

== Aftermath ==
With these setbacks, Yuan Shao missed an opportunity to take advantage of the situation. His apparent inaction was explained as simple procrastination in the major biographies in the Book of the Later Han and the Records of the Three Kingdoms. It is very possible that Yu Jin's stiff resistance delayed Yuan Shao's advance and gave Yuan Shao more pause.

Now that Cao Cao was back in Guandu, the opportunity to attack Cao Cao's weakness had passed. Tian Feng reverted his previous plan and advocated a policy of caution against Cao Cao. Holding fast the mountains and the rivers, Tian Feng reasoned that Yuan Shao could fight a battle of agriculture to outlast Cao Cao while exhausting the enemy with crack troops from multiple directions, thus winning the battle in two years. Yuan Shao had the idea of a decisive battle and would not use Tian Feng's plan. When Tian Feng continued his remonstrances, Yuan Shao had him imprisoned on charges of demoralizing the army. Cao Cao was said to have been delighted at the news.

With his mind set on an all-out offence, Yuan Shao had Chen Lin draft a propaganda pamphlet detailing the rationale of war and Cao Cao's various crimes to be distributed throughout the country. In March 200, Yuan Shao brought his army to the forward base of Liyang (黎陽; northwest of present-day Xun County, Henan) and engaged Cao Cao's forces at the Battle of Boma.
