= Battle of Liyang =

Conflict between warlord Cao Cao and sons of Yuan Shao (202-203)

- Part of the wars at the end of the Han dynasty
Date	c.October 202 (Note: The 9th month of the 7th year of the Jian'an era corresponds to 4 Oct to 2 Nov 202 in the Julian calendar.) – June 203 (Note: The 5th month of the 8th year of the Jian'an era corresponds to 29 May to 26 Jun 203 in the Julian calendar.)
Location	Henan and Hebei, China
Result	Withdrawal of Cao Cao's main army; mutiny of Yuan Tan
Territorial changes	Cao Cao establishes a bridgehead in Liyang

Belligerents
Cao Cao	Yuan Shang

Commanders and leaders
Cao Cao	Yuan Shang; Yuan Tan

Battle of Liyang
- Traditional Chinese: 黎陽之戰
- Simplified Chinese: 黎阳之战
Transcriptions
Standard Mandarin
- Hanyu Pinyin: Líyáng Zhī Zhàn

The Battle of Liyang, fought between October 202 and June 203 in the late Eastern Han dynasty, was an invasion attempt by the warlord Cao Cao against the brothers Yuan Shang and Yuan Tan, the sons of Cao's rival Yuan Shao. The battle in October 202 was the first between the two factions since the death of Yuan Shao four months earlier. Although it ended in Cao Cao's withdrawal, events in this battle brought tensions between the Yuan brothers to the surface as Yuan Tan mutinied against his younger brother Yuan Shang after Cao Cao's temporary exit from the scene.

== Background ==
After years of civil war since the failed campaign against Dong Zhuo, two major factions emerged from the multitudes of feuding warlords: one led by the northern warlord Yuan Shao who nominally controlled the provinces of Ji, Qing, Bing, and You; the other led by his former friend and subordinate Cao Cao, who, in addition to the three provinces of Yan, Yu, and Xu, also had the imperial court and the Han Emperor Xian under his control. The two warlords clashed in the Battle of Guandu of 200, which ended decisively in Cao Cao's favour. Although Yuan Shao was defeated, he managed to reorganize his army, and the rebellions that sought to take advantage of his defeat were quickly suppressed. Yuan Shao died in June 202, said to be in frustration and anger at his defeat, leaving his sons to succeed his legacy.

Yuan Shao was survived by three sons: the eldest son Yuan Tan, the second son Yuan Xi, and the youngest son Yuan Shang. Although it was customary for the eldest son to succeed the father, Yuan Shao had favoured the good-looking Yuan Shang and had arranged for Yuan Tan to be adopted by his elder brother, Yuan Tan's uncle. Since Yuan Shao never formally decided on an heir, the uncertainties regarding the inheritance remained uncertain upon his death, dividing Yuan Shao's camp into two. Among Yuan Shao's advisors, Xin Ping and Guo Tu supported Yuan Tan while Pang Ji and Shen Pei rallied behind Yuan Shang. Although there was a general expectation that the eldest Yuan Tan will succeed his father, the pro-Yuan Shang faction feared reappraisal from Yuan Tan and produced a forged will that proclaimed Yuan Shang as the successor. A resentful Yuan Tan then took his army away to Liyang (黎陽; northwest of present-day Xun County, Henan) by the Yellow River which held the frontier against Cao Cao. Yuan Shang sent a few additional troops with Pang Ji to assist (or spy on) Yuan Tan, but refused his brother's plea when Yuan Tan requested further reinforcements. A furious Yuan Tan killed Pang Ji in response.

Cao Cao had shifted his focus away from the Yuan clan after his victorious Guandu campaign, but eventually returned to the frontline fortifications in Guandu in the spring of 202. His advisor Xun Yu had previously warned Cao Cao to not turn his back on his newly defeated enemy, lest the remnants regroup and strike from behind. Four months after Yuan Shao's death, Cao Cao led his army across the Yellow River to attack the remnants at Liyang.

== The battle ==
Cao Cao put Li Dian and Cheng Yu in charge of supplies while he crossed the river. The supplies were to be ferried by water, but Yuan Shang's officer Gao Fan (高蕃) held a position on the river and blocked the supply line. Cao Cao initially suggested that the goods should be brought by land instead, but since Li Dian argued that Gao Fan's men were lightly armed and not prepared for naval warfare, he allowed Li Dian and Cheng Yu to attack Gao Fan. The attack was successful, and the water route was cleared for the supply train.

Historical sources vary on the events following Cao Cao's crossing. The official Wei records in Records of the Three Kingdoms indicate that Cao Cao won successive battles over the course of six months, forced the Yuan brothers out of Liyang but suddenly lifted the siege of the Yuan headquarters of Ye and withdrew to Xu City. However, Yuan Shao's biography in the Book of the Later Han, and contemporary references such as the Chu Shi Biao contradict the Wei account, while the fact that the operation took so long also suggests that it might not have gone as smoothly as Cao Cao's official biography stated. It was more likely, therefore, that the Wei records suppressed mention of Cao Cao's defeats in this region. (Note: Hu Sanxing also adopted the viewpoint that Cao Cao's defeats were suppressed.) Using a combination of the aforementioned sources, an alternate account of the battle is presented below.

Outmatched by Cao Cao in numbers, Yuan Tan found it difficult to hold his position in Liyang and sent for help. In response, Yuan Shang left Shen Pei to guard Ye while he brought his army in person to reinforce Liyang. The two sides fought west and south outside Liyang, where remains of the defenses used in the battle could still be seen during the Tang dynasty. In April 203, (Note: Traditional sources differ slightly on when Cao Cao launched his final attack at Liyang. Yuan Shao's biography in Book of the Later Han dated the final attack to the 2nd month of the 8th year of the Jian'an era (corresponding to 1 to 30 Mar 203 in the Julian calendar), while Cao Cao's biography in Records of the Three Kingdoms recorded that the final attack took place on the 3rd month of that year (corresponding to 31 Mar to 28 Apr 203). In his Zizhi Tongjian Kaoyi, Sima Guang noted that Tongjian adopted the account found in Yuan Shao's biography in Book; he also noted that Yuan Shao's biography in Records recorded that Cao Cao and the Yuan brothers had a stalemate at Liyang from the 2nd to 9th month. Sima then opinioned that the duration should be from the 9th month to the 2nd month of the following year.) the Yuan brothers came out of their fortification, but Cao Cao overran them and forced them back behind the walls of Liyang proper. Before Cao Cao could lay siege to Liyang, though, the brothers withdrew at night to Ye, seventy kilometers to the north.

The next month, Cao Cao's army followed the Yuan brothers' retreat until they reached Ye. Here, however, he appeared to have outstretched himself and was driven back by Yuan Shang's counterattack outside the city. The setback caused Cao Cao to turn his attention away from the Yuan headquarters for the moment, as he turned east to storm the city of Yin'an (陰安; in present-day Qingfeng, Henan) and collected grains from the granaries in southern Wei Commandery (around present-day Handan, Hebei). By the time Cao Cao was ready to attack Ye again in late May or June 203, his advisor Guo Jia offered advice to the contrary to take advantage of the Yuan brothers' simmering tensions:

"Yuan Shao loved those two sons, but neither was proclaimed as his heir. Now they are rivals for power and each has his own party. If we press them hard they will support one another, but if we ease off they will begin to quarrel. The best plan is to turn south against Jing Province and wait for something to happen. When things have changed, we can attack then, and the whole affair may be settled in a single blow."

Cao Cao accepted the advice and retreated homeward, placing Jia Xin (賈信) in the beachhead fortress of Liyang while presumably leaving the untenable position of Yin'an to his enemies.

When Cao Cao was retreating across the Yellow River, Yuan Tan requested new equipment and additional troops from Yuan Shang so he could catch Cao Cao mid-river. Doubtful of his elder brother's intentions, Yuan Shang granted neither. Yuan Tan's advisors Guo Tu and Xin Ping added fuel to the fire by suggesting it was Shen Pei who made Yuan Shao send Yuan Tan away to be adopted by his uncle, causing a furious Yuan Tan to turn his army to attack Yuan Shang and Shen Pei in Ye. Yuan Tan was defeated and fled to Nanpi, while Cao Cao returned to his capital Xu City apparently unmolested.

== Aftermath ==
Despite initial successes, Cao Cao had suffered setbacks, and in the end could only retain the beachhead Liyang after nine months of campaigning. He stayed in Xu City for the next three months, possibly to assert his authority to prevent any disorder that might arise from his extended absence. During his stay there, he issued two proclamations that sought to punish and demote unsuccessful officers, with the reason that ranks and rewards should not be given to those who failed to earn them.

The threat of the Yuan brothers would soon resolve itself, as Guo Jia had reasoned. The Yuan brothers had turned against each other, with Yuan Shang gaining the upper hand in the fraternal conflict. Yuan Tan was eventually driven from Nanpi and took refuge in Pingyuan; besieged there, he turned to Cao Cao for help. The Governor of Jing Province Liu Biao, an old ally of Yuan Shao, had the famed writer Wang Can write a letter each to Yuan Tan and Yuan Shang on his behalf, urging them to fight against their nemesis Cao Cao, not amongst themselves. The letter to Yuan Tan in particular celebrated the Yuan brothers' victory in Ye against a strong enemy, and sternly disapproved of Yuan Tan's reliance on Cao Cao. Still, Liu Biao's remonstrances fell on deaf ears.

Cao Cao was engaged in battle with Liu Biao on their common border when Yuan Tan's ambassador Xin Pi approached him. It turned out that Xin Pi was disillusioned about his lord, and suggested to Cao Cao that this would be the opportunity to destroy both Yuan Shang and Yuan Tan before the two brothers make up and unite their forces. Xun Yu had also made an argument along these lines previously. Cao Cao accepted the advice and ostensibly allied with Yuan Tan. In 204, Cao Cao launched an attack from Liyang and routed Yuan Shang's army from Ye to relieve Yuan Tan, causing Yuan Shang to seek refuge with Yuan Xi. In the year after that, Cao Cao accused Yuan Tan of ill intent and canceled the alliance, and followed that by laying siege to Nanpi. Yuan Tan was killed in that battle. The Yuan clan's hold on China's north was thus broken, though they would hold on until their final destruction in 207.
