= Lu Kuang =

Lu Kuang may refer to:

- Lukuang football team, now National Sports Training Center football team, Taiwan
- Lü Kuang (呂曠), a military officer in the Battle of Nanpi
