= Cheng Yu =

Han Dynasty politician and official (141–220)

- 程昱

Minister of the Guards (衛尉) (in Cao Cao's vassal kingdom)
- In office 213 – 220
- Monarch: Emperor Xian of Han
- Chancellor: Cao Cao

General Who Uplifts Military Might (奮武將軍)
- In office 203 – 213
- Monarch: Emperor Xian of Han
- Chancellor: Cao Cao (from 208 onwards)

General Who Inspires Might (振威將軍)
- In office 200 – 203
- Monarch: Emperor Xian of Han

Administrator of Jiyin (濟陰太守)
- In office 196 – 200
- Monarch: Emperor Xian of Han

Chancellor of Dongping (東平相)
- In office 194 – 196
- Monarch: Emperor Xian of Han

Prefect of Shouzhang (壽張令)
- In office 192 – 194
- Monarch: Emperor Xian of Han

Personal details
- Born: 141 (Note: Cheng Yu's biography in the Sanguozhi recorded that he died not long after Cao Pi ascended the throne in late 220. The year ends on 9 Feb 221 in the Julian calendar. The Wei Shu further recorded that he was 80 years old (by East Asian age reckoning) when he died. By calculation, Cheng Yu's year of birth should be 141.) Dong'e County, Shandong
- Died: c.December 220 (aged 79)
- Children: Cheng Wu; Cheng Yan
- Occupation: Politician
- Courtesy name: Zhongde (仲徳)
- Posthumous name: Marquis Su (肅侯)
- Peerage: Marquis of An District (安鄉侯)
- Other name: Cheng Li (程立)

Cheng Yu (141 – c.December 220), originally named Cheng Li, courtesy name Zhongde, was a Chinese politician who lived during the late Eastern Han dynasty of China. He was an adviser to Cao Cao, the warlord who became the de facto head of the Han central government during that period. He died in December 220 – soon after Cao Cao's son, Cao Pi, usurped the throne from Emperor Xian (the last Han emperor) and established the state of Cao Wei, an event marking the start of the Three Kingdoms period in China. Cheng Yu was described as a tall man (approximately 1.91 metres) with a beautiful long beard. He was from Dong'e County in present-day Shandong. He was also noted for his expertise in military tactics, which helped Cao Cao defeat Yuan Shao at the Battle of Guandu in 200 and consolidate control over northern China. It is widely agreed that his numerous contributions laid the foundation of the Cao Wei state. After Cheng Yu's death, Cao Pi honoured him with the posthumous title "Marquis Su", meaning "solemn marquis".

== Incidents in hometown ==
Cheng Yu's original given name was "Li" (立) but he changed it to "Yu" (昱; literally "lifting the sun") after he had a dream about the sun on top of Mount Tai. He was from Dong'e County, which is in present-day Shandong. There is nothing recorded in history about his early life; he was known for his courage in the areas around his hometown when he was in his early 40s. When the Yellow Turban Rebellion broke out in the 180s, a county magistrate, Wang Du, burnt down the food stored in the warehouse and instigated his subordinates to seize the city. The county prefect escaped the city and went into hiding, while the town residents took their families eastward and camped beside a mountain. After receiving intelligence from his spies that Wang Du had moved out and camped 1.3 to 1.6 miles away from the city, Cheng Yu reported to and told a local parvenu, Xue Fang, that Wang Du must not have the ability to control the situation, so they should retrieve the prefect and reoccupy the city. Xue Fang agreed to Cheng Yu's plan, yet the commoners refused to comply, wherein Cheng Yu angrily said: "Stupid commoners lack the ability to plan." He then plotted with Xue Fang, and secretly sent several cavalry holding streamers to the hilltop, where they rode down toward the civilians. Xue Fang and his men then screamed upon seeing the riders, making the commoners mistake them for Yellow Turban rebels. Led by Xue Fang, the mass kept running until back into the city, where they realised that the rebels were not so terrifying and started to defend the city with the prefect, whom Cheng Yu found later.

Seeing the inhabitants had come back, Wang Du launched an attack, but was foiled by Cheng Yu's defences. After some time, Wang Du could no longer hold on and intended to move elsewhere. Cheng Yu then led a sudden attack when Wang Du was packing, dealing him a major blow which enabled the survival of Dong'e County.

In 192, Liu Dai, the Inspector of Yan Province, invited Cheng Yu to join his administration but Cheng Yu refused. At the beginning, Liu Dai had very good relationship with the warlords Yuan Shao and Gongsun Zan, wherein Yuan Shao sent his family to reside with Liu Dai while Gongsun Zan sent a detachment of elite cavalry to help Liu Dai fight the Yellow Turbans in the area; however, Yuan Shao and Gongsun Zan became bitter enemies later, and were way more powerful than Liu Dai, who was forced to pick a side. Liu Dai then sought advice from Cheng Yu, who told the former that asking for help from Gongsun Zan was like requesting someone to save a drowning child from afar. He further analysed that Gongsun Zan, who had recently gained a minor military victory over Yuan Shao, would eventually lose to the latter. Therefore, it was not wise to enjoy a short-term benefit without a careful long-term plan. Liu Dai agreed with Cheng Yu's speech and severed ties with Gongsun Zan, who ordered his cavalry in Yan Province to return to his base in You Province. Just as Cheng Yu had predicted, Gongsun Zan soon suffered a heavy defeat by Yuan Shao before his cavalry could even join the battle. Liu Dai then asked Cheng Yu to become his officer, and offered him the position of a Cavalry Commandant, but Cheng Yu again refused employment.

== Coming to serve Cao Cao ==
However, without the assistance from Gongsun Zan's elite cavalry, Liu Dai was soon killed by the Yellow Turbans, and Cao Cao came forth to take over the province. Upon his arrival, Cao Cao sent Cheng Yu a letter concerning his presence in the government. Cheng Yu replied to Cao Cao that he accepted the offer right away, so the commoners asked Cheng Yu: "How can you change your attitude so snobbishly?" Cheng Yu laughed at them without comment. When Cheng Yu joined Cao Cao, he was only assigned as a prefect, a position far lower than the ones Liu Dai offered him in the past. Still, Cheng Yu was determined to follow Cao Cao, as evidenced by his defences against the warlord Lü Bu, who attacked Cao Cao's base while the latter was away on a campaign in Xu Province.

== Performance in Lü Bu's invasion ==
When Lü Bu claimed his rule over Yan Province, many people gave up resistance and joined him; only Juancheng, Dong'e and Fan counties did not yield. At the time, Cheng Yu was guarding Juancheng with Cao Cao's chief strategist, Xun Yu, who analysed that the defences could only be successful if the officials guarding the three counties worked together. Xun Yu then asked Cheng Yu to oversee the defence of Dong'e County because he could probably convince his hometown to fight with him. Thus, Xun Yu stayed behind to watch over the fortress, and Cheng Yu went to Dong'e County. On his way, Cheng Yu passed by Fan County, where Si Yi (氾嶷), an official under Lü Bu, was trying to persuade the prefect of Fan County to switch allegiance to his lord. Cheng Yu sought a meeting with the prefect and managed to persuade him to reject and kill Si Yi. When he arrived at Dong'e County, Xue Ti (薛悌) and Zao Zhi had already set up defences around the area, so Cheng Yu split his cavalry force out to take control of Cangting ford to block the advances of Lü Bu's strategist, Chen Gong. Xue Ti then formulated a strategy with Cheng Yu, which enabled the defences of the three counties until Cao Cao returned from Xu Province.

The year 194 was a hard time for Cao Cao, because in addition to losing several battles to Lü Bu around Puyang, a widespread famine also broke out in Yan Province (but this also forced Lü Bu to retreat). For once, Cao Cao thought about relinquishing his position in Yan Province, and prepared to surrender to Yuan Shao. Nevertheless, Cheng Yu rebuked Cao Cao by saying that he had a calibre greater than just being a subject under Yuan Shao, and it was shameful for a genius to submit to a man who only enjoyed an overvalued fame. Cheng Yu said to Cao Cao: "Even a mere warrior like Tian Heng knew about shame, how could you act so shamefully to surrender to Yuan Shao?"

According to the book of anecdotes Wei Jin Shiyu (魏晉世語) quoted in the Annotated Records of the Three Kingdoms, Cheng Yu provided Cao Cao's infamished army with three days' worth of supplies by pillaging his hometown and mixing human meat into the provisions. The record alleges that because of what he'd done here, Cheng Yu's reputation was such that he was never made one of the Three Ducal Ministers (Note: Throughout Cao Wei's existence, dukedoms were only handed out to kinsmen of the Cao clan until Sima Zhao was made Duke of Jin in December 263. Thus, the gong (公) mentioned at the end of Cheng Yu's biography in Sanguozhi more likely refers to making him one of the Three Ducal Ministers.), the highest ministerial positions in the imperial court.

== Liu Bei's betrayal ==
After Lü Bu was forced to abandon Yan Province, Cheng Yu and Xun Yu advised Cao Cao to escort Emperor Xian, who was in dire straits, into territory under Cao Cao's control. After Emperor Xian made it to Xuchang (Cao Cao's base) from Luoyang, Cheng Yu was appointed as a Master of Writing in the Han central government but was soon promoted to be East General of the Household and appointed as the Administrator of Jiyin Commandery. In 198, Lü Bu took Xu Province from Liu Bei, who surrendered to Cao Cao for protection. Cheng Yu told Cao Cao that Liu Bei was an ambitious man with many admirers and that he would not be a subject for long, so he should be taken care of as soon as possible. Cao Cao refused under the rationale that he did not want the death of one individual to affect the decision of others who might yield to the Han central government.

The following year, Cao Cao, Sun Ce and others defeated the warlord Yuan Shu, who then attempted to head north to join his half-brother, Yuan Shao. Liu Bei volunteered to intercept Yuan Shu and was granted a sizable army to do his job. When Cheng Yu heard the news, he rushed to Cao Cao and protested: "It's arguable you turned down our suggestion to kill Liu Bei earlier, but it's a certainty that he will betray you if lent a force." Thus, Cao Cao regretted his decision and sent an envoy to call the troops back, but it was already too late. Liu Bei led his army east to Xu Province, killed Che Zhou (車胄; the provincial governor appointed by Cao Cao) and seized control of the province.

== Cao Cao's northern campaign ==
When Yuan Shao defeated Gongsun Zan and congregated the four provinces north of the Yellow River, he assembled an army of over 100,000 to declare war against Cao Cao. Cheng Yu was made a general and was stationed in Juancheng with 700 soldiers. Cao Cao then sent a letter to Cheng Yu and asserted to Cheng Yu that he would send 2,000 men as reinforcements. However, Cheng Yu replied: "Yuan Shao has 100,000 men and considers himself invincible. If he sees I only have such a small army, he will not attack easily. On the contrary, if my position is strong (enough to threaten his movement), then he will not be able to pass me by without attacking; if he attacks, he'll surely win, so it will be a mere waste to send in reinforcement. I hope you could understand my rationale and don't doubt on that." Cao Cao was happy that he did not need to send additional troops to Cheng Yu, and was able to defeat Liu Bei in Xu Province within a short time.

Three years after Cao Cao defeated Yuan Shao at the Battle of Guandu, Cheng Yu recruited and enlisted several thousand robbers and inhabitants of deep hills around Yan Province, and led them to rendezvous with Cao Cao in Liyang, where Cao Cao had set up a front line military operation base against Yuan Tan and Yuan Shang. Along with Li Dian, Cheng Yu transported grain to Cao Cao by ships. Once, the supply line was blocked by Gao Fan, the Administrator of Wei Commandery, who capitalised on the geographic advantage. Cao Cao then ordered Cheng Yu to abandon the waterway and transport through other routes. However, Li Dian reasoned with Cheng Yu that Gao Fan could be defeated because he was lightly guarded with a small army. Therefore, they violated Cao Cao's order, and landed the northern bank and defeated Gao Fan, resulting in the smooth delivery of military necessities.

After the defeat of Yuan Tan and Yuan Shang, Cheng Yu was made General Who Uplifts Military Might (奮武將軍) and Marquis of Anguo (安国亭侯).

== Battle of Red Cliffs ==
In 208, Cao Cao accepted the surrender of Liu Cong, the governor of Jing Province, and sent a letter to the eastern warlord, Sun Quan, to inform the latter that he had assembled an 800,000 strong force in Jiangling, and was eager to meet Sun Quan in person. The majority believed that Sun Quan would surely kill Liu Bei and submit to Cao Cao, but Cheng Yu correctly analysed that Sun Quan would support Liu Bei to fight a desperate war. However, due to the fact that Cao Cao enjoyed an absolute advantage both in terms of military and economy; therefore he did not take Cheng Yu's counsel seriously, and Cao Cao held lavish banquets on his warships from time to time. Out of negligence, none of Cao Cao's officers knew that the wind direction would change a few days per year along the Yangtze River, and so they thought that the direction of the wind gave Cao Cao's side the advantage. While Cao Cao was certain that the allied forces could not make use of a fire attack, nevertheless the enemy commander, Zhou Yu, had Cao Cao's grand fleet reduced to ashes overnight.

== Advice to Cao Pi ==
When Cao Cao went west to fight against Ma Chao and Han Sui, Cheng Yu was assigned as a strategist to Cao Cao's son Cao Pi, who was in charge of the capital. During the time that Cao Cao went west, some local gentries in Hejian Commandery rebelled. When Cao Pi sent a general to subdue the revolt, several thousand rebels offered to surrender after being besieged. A meeting was held within the court to decide whether the surrender of the rebels should be accepted or not. Many participants of the discussion proposed to reject the surrender, because Cao Cao once issued a fiat that those who surrendered after being besieged should be executed. Cheng Yu opposed and said, "The reason why Cao Cao set such an expedient rule was that he was fighting against numerous enemies in a chaotic time. To execute those who surrender after being besieged could intimidate other potential enemies, and encouraged early submissions; subsequently, we did not need to lay siege every time. However, the territory under our control is now stabilised, and this battle happens within our own domain; so therefore these kinds of enemies will surely surrender, and killing them will not threaten other enemies. Thus, to kill the rebels now is not the primary focus of Cao Cao's rule. I suggest that their surrender be accepted; if you must execute them, then please inform master Cao first." The feckless audience simply ignored Cheng Yu's rationale, and vindicated their choice by claiming that they had the autonomy over military issues and that it was not necessary to report every single provision. Cheng Yu remained in silence and the officers left the meeting. After the exodus, Cao Pi specifically consulted Cheng Yu to see if he held any thought back in the discussion, wherein Cheng Yu replied, "The reason why Commandants and Commanders were given autonomic power is because frontline military issues are so imminent that decisions must be made immediately. But the surrendered rebels are enfettered by your general, and have no way to mutiny. That is why I don't want to see you use (abuse) your authority. (Note: Cao Pi's father, Cao Cao, bore a furtive displeasure towards him, and even wavered to replace him with Cao Zhi. Therefore, Cheng Yu's plan was actually in favour of Cao Pi, because by dissuading Cao Pi away from abusing his authority, it also dissuaded him away from drawing repulsion from Cao Cao.) Feeling delighted by Cheng Yu's support, Cao Pi changed his mind and reported the issue to Cao Cao, who ordered the surrendered rebels to be spared. As Cheng Yu expected, the bond between Cao Pi and his father, Cao Cao was strengthened as a result of their correspondence. After Cao Cao returned from his expedition, he particularly expressed his gratitude to Cheng Yu by claiming Cheng Yu to be an intelligent man who not only excelled in tactics but also knew how to manage the relationship between father and son.

== Later life and death ==
Cheng Yu went into semi-retirement after losing to his political rival, Xing Zhen (邢貞). What was worse for him was that much invectives were done to Cheng Yu after his downfall, and someone even accused him of harbouring the intention of rebelling, but Cao Cao did not further investigate his once trusted aide; in contrast, he gave Cheng Yu more monetary rewards. Cheng Yu remained as a commoner and seldom left his home until Cao Pi usurped the throne from Emperor Xian in late 220. Cheng Yu was re-instituted as the Minister of the Guards (Note: However, Cheng Yu's name, title and peerage appeared in a memorial named "Gongqing Jiangjun Zou Shang Zunhao" (公卿将军奏上尊号; recorded in vol.28 of "Quan Sanguo Wen" (全三国文)). This memorial can be dated to Cao Pi's reign as King of Wei as Hua Xin's and Wang Lang's titles were Chancellor and Grand Secretary respectively, positions they held before Cao Pi crowned himself emperor. Thus, according to this memorial, Cheng Yu regaining the position of Minister of the Guards took place after Cao Pi became King of Wei and before he became emperor. His peerage in the memorial was listed as "Tinghou of Anguo" (安国亭侯, the peerage he received when he was simultaneously granted the position of General Who Uplifts Military Might after the defeat of Yuan Tan and Yuan Shang).) and earned a tax revenue from a marquisate composed of 800 taxable households. (Note: Cheng Yu earned a tax revenue from 500 taxable households during his service under Cao Cao and was granted an additional 300 households during Cao Pi's reign.) Since Cao Pi intended to make Cheng Yu one of the Three Ducal Ministers when he became emperor in late 220, a discussion was made in regard to the issue. However, Cheng Yu died before the decision would be settled. He was given the posthumous title "Marquis Su" for his inviolable reverence (See Xing Zhen's case in the following section). Both his young son Cheng Yan and grandson Cheng Xiao (程晓) were made Marquis, and Cheng Yu was succeeded by his eldest son, Cheng Wu (程武) after death. His grandson Cheng Xiao became a well-known scholar later.

== Appraisal ==
Despite being famous for his paradoxes, Cheng Yu tended to belittle others in his speeches. For once, he inveighed Cao Cao as inferior to the likes of Tian Heng (田橫), who was a mere warrior, when he tried to dissuade Cao Cao from surrendering to Yuan Shao. He also used to call his townsfolk "stupid commoners".

Cheng Yu was a recalcitrant old man, and his hidebound characteristic compelled him to quarrel with others on a frequent basis. There is a quaint incident about how he entered a predicament when he offended Xing Zhen. When Cao Cao was first enfeoffed as a vassal by Emperor Xian, he appointed Cheng Yu as the Minister of the Guards (衛尉) in his vassal state, while Xing Zhen was appointed as the Commandant of the Capital (中尉). However, Cheng Yu had a rabid quirk in pontificating his dominance, and he purposely flaunted in front of Xing Zhen, who reported his invidious behaviour to Cao Cao. As punishment, Cheng Yu was stripped of his position.

Although ingeniously intelligent, Cheng Yu was of a perverse and hardhearted nature. As a possibly fictional annotation recounts, he once ransacked his hometown, Dong'e County, and kidnapped his own townfolk to feed Cao Cao's army in an act of cannibalism. It was recorded that Cheng Yu would have the abducted cut into pieces to mix with rice, so the soldiers would enjoy their prized meals.

== In Romance of the Three Kingdoms ==
In the 14th-century historical novel Romance of the Three Kingdoms, Cheng Yu offered a ruse in order to get Xu Shu to serve Cao Cao. At the time Xu Shu was serving as rival Liu Bei's key strategist and managed to score a major victory against Cao Cao's officers Lü Kuang (呂曠), Lü Xiang (呂翔) and Cao Ren. Exploiting the fact that Xu Shu was an extremely filial son, Cheng Yu suggested to Cao Cao that Cao Cao hold Xu Shu's mother hostage and force Xu Shu to leave Liu Bei and serve Cao Cao. Cheng Yu wrote a fake letter to Xu Shu and successfully tricked Xu Shu to come to Xuchang. Ironically, Xu Shu's mother committed suicide after seeing her son fall for such a ruse and leaving a righteous person like Liu Bei to serve under the ruthless Cao Cao. Prior to the Battle of Red Cliffs, Cheng Yu had predicted that Sun Quan's forces would use fire to attack Cao Cao's naval fleet. However, Cao Cao did not heed his advice seriously as the winds were to their advantage then. After Cao Cao's major defeat, Cheng Yu was one of the few advisers who stood by Cao Cao all the way during their escape.

== See also ==
- Lists of people of the Three Kingdoms
