= Tian Feng =

Han dynasty official and advisor (died 200)

- 田豐
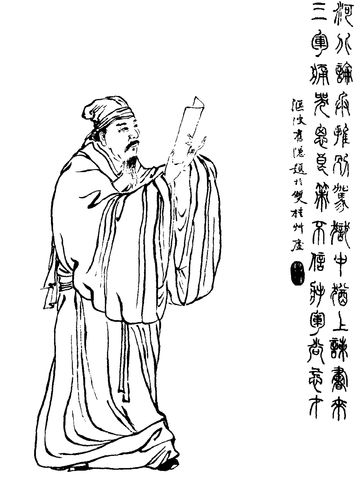
- A Qing dynasty illustration of Tian Feng

Attendant Officer (別駕) (under Yuan Shao)
- In office c. 191 – 200
- Monarch: Emperor Xian of Han

Personal details
- Born: Unknown Julu County, Hebei / Nanpi County, Hebei
- Died: November 200
- Occupation: Politician
- Courtesy name: Yuanhao (元皓)

Tian Feng (died November 200), courtesy name Yuanhao, was a Chinese politician serving under the warlord Yuan Shao during the late Eastern Han dynasty.

== Life ==
There are two accounts of Tian Feng's origins: One said that he was from Julu Commandery (鉅鹿郡), which is around present-day Julu County, Hebei; the other claimed that he was from Bohai Commandery (勃海郡), which is around present-day Nanpi County, Hebei. He lost his parents at a young age and lived a rather unhappy life. However, he was known for being well-read, knowledgeable and intelligent. He started his career probably sometime during the reign of Emperor Ling (r. 168–189) as a minor official in the office of the Grand Commandant (太尉). Later, he was nominated as a maocai (茂才; outstanding civil service candidate) and promoted to an Imperial Clerk (御史). When the eunuch faction dominated the imperial court, Tian Feng felt so disillusioned with politics that he resigned and returned home.

Around 190, the warlord Yuan Shao joined a coalition of warlords in a campaign against the tyrannical warlord Dong Zhuo, who controlled the Han central government and the figurehead Emperor Xian. He had heard of Tian Feng and wanted to recruit him as an adviser, so he sent Tian Feng expensive gifts and wrote him a letter in a humble and sincere tone. Tian Feng accepted the invitation because he saw it as an opportunity for him to serve the Han Empire and save it from collapse. Yuan Shao appointed him as an Attendant Officer (別駕).

Around 195, Tian Feng advised Yuan Shao to welcome Emperor Xian to Ji Province so that he could control the Emperor and use him as a "trump card" against rival warlords. However, Yuan Shao refused after listening to his other advisers. Eventually, Yuan Shao's rival Cao Cao welcomed Emperor Xian to his base in Xu (許; present-day Xuchang, Henan) and established the new imperial capital there.

Throughout the 190s, Yuan Shao engaged Gongsun Zan in a war for supremacy over northern China. During the Battle of Jieqiao in 192, when Yuan Shao came under attack by Gongsun Zan, Tian Feng urged him to take cover behind a wall, but Yuan Shao threw his helmet to the ground and said it would be cowardly of him to hide behind a wall. Nevertheless, Yuan Shao heeded Tian Feng's advice and managed to defeat Gongsun Zan at the Battle of Yijing in 199. After securing his control over the four provinces in northern China, Yuan Shao prepared to wage war against Cao Cao and launch an attack on the imperial capital Xu. Tian Feng and Ju Shou advised Yuan Shao to adopt a slow, steady and step-by-step approach, so as to gradually wear out Cao Cao's forces. However, Yuan Shao heeded the advice of Guo Tu and others instead, and chose to start an all-out war against Cao Cao immediately.

In 200, when Cao Cao was away attacking Liu Bei in Xu Province, Tian Feng urged Yuan Shao to seize the opportunity to launch an attack on Cao Cao's base at Xu. However, Yuan Shao refused and said that he was more concerned about his son, who was sick. The frustrated Tian Feng hit the ground with his staff and said, "What a pity that he let a rare opportunity slip by just because of a child's illness!" In the meantime, Cao Cao defeated Liu Bei and retook Xu Province. Liu Bei fled north after his defeat and took shelter under Yuan Shao.

Later in 200, before the Battle of Guandu, Tian Feng analysed the situation, advised Yuan Shao to fight a long-term war against Cao Cao and pointed out how it would work to Yuan Shao's advantage. When Yuan Shao refused to listen, Tian Feng repeatedly attempted to push his ideas through. Yuan Shao, thinking that Tian Feng was trying to dampen his troops' morale, became furious and ordered Tian Feng to be put in chains and thrown into prison.

After Yuan Shao lost the Battle of Guandu against Cao Cao, someone told Tian Feng, "Your talents will be put to good use again." Tian Feng, however, replied, "If our army won the battle, I will survive; if they lost, I will die." Tian Feng was not on good terms with Pang Ji, one of Yuan Shao's other advisers. After the battle, Pang Ji lied to Yuan Shao that Tian Feng had clapped his hands and had rejoiced upon hearing of their defeat. Yuan Shao became so angry that he ordered Tian Feng's execution.

== See also ==
- Lists of people of the Three Kingdoms
