= Han Fu (warlord) =

Chinese official and warlord (died 192)

- 韓馥

Governor of Ji Province (冀州牧)
- In office 189–191
- Monarch: Emperor Xian of Han
- Preceded by: Jia Cong
- Succeeded by: Yuan Shao

Palace Assistant Imperial Clerk (御史中丞)
- In office ?–189
- Monarchs: Emperor Ling of Han / Emperor Xian of Han

Master of Writing (尚書)
- In office ?–?
- Monarch: Emperor Ling of Han

Personal details
- Born: Unknown Xuchang, Henan
- Died: 192 Chenliu
- Occupation: Military general, politician, warlord
- Courtesy name: Wenjie (文節)

Han Fu (died 192), courtesy name Wenjie, was a Chinese military general, politician, and warlord who lived during the late Eastern Han dynasty. He was the governor of Ji Province (present-day southern Hebei) when the Yellow Turban Rebellion broke out in 184.

== Life ==
Han Fu served as a Master of Writing, then as Palace Assistant Imperial Clerk until 189, when Dong Zhuo named him the governor of Ji Province. During that year, Yuan Shao began plotting against Dong Zhuo, and Han Fu was unsure of whom to support. He sent some of his officers to keep Yuan Shao in check, but later in the year, he was persuaded by his Headquarters Officer Liu Zihui to ally with Yuan Shao.

In 191, when Yuan Shao's alliance broke apart, Han Fu attempted to control Yuan Shao by limiting his supplies. However, in response, Yuan Shao contacted Qu Yi, a rebellious officer under Han Fu, and urged Gongsun Zan to advance against Han Fu from the north while he brought his troops down the Yellow River. These military actions served their effect, and Han Fu was intimidated. His friend Guo Tu, Yuan Shao's nephew Gao Gan, and some of Han Fu's other officers convinced him that the only course of action was to yield the province to Yuan Shao, which Han Fu then did.

Under the rule of Yuan Shao, Han Fu's family was harassed, with one Zhu Han, seeking revenge on Han Fu for being mistreated by him in the past, came to Han Fu's home and broke his son's legs. Many of Han Fu's supporters left him or were killed by Yuan Shao after they tried to stop him from taking over the province, which led Han Fu to leave his home in Yingchuan for Zhang Miao, but he then believed that Zhang Miao was plotting against him, so he ended his own life.

== In Romance of the Three Kingdoms ==
In the 14th-century historical novel Romance of the Three Kingdoms, Han Fu is one of the warlords who join the campaign against Dong Zhuo. After the coalition breaks up, he returns to Ji Province. Yuan Shao begins to look at the options to remove his dependency on the food shipment from Han Fu to maintain his troops. Following Pang Ji's advice, Yuan Shao pretends to be willing to divide Han Fu's territory with Gongsun Zan if he attacks Han Fu. Seeing the incoming invasion from Gongsun Zan, the frightened Han Fu surrenders his territory to Yuan Shao even though a number of officials beg him to reconsider. After Yuan Shao takes over Ji Province, he keeps the territory for himself and removes Han Fu from power. The disappointed Han Fu leaves everything, including his family and goes to seek refuge with Zhang Miao in Chenliu Commandery. However, when he hears that Yuan Shao's messenger has met Zhang Miao, he thinks that Yuan Shao wants Zhang Miao to kill him, so he commits suicide.

== See also ==
- Lists of people of the Three Kingdoms
