= He Yong (Han dynasty) =

2nd-century Chinese Han dynasty official

- 何顒

Chief Clerk (長史)
- In office c. 189–?
- Monarch: Emperor Xian of Han
- Chancellor: Dong Zhuo

Beijun Zhonghou (北軍中侯)
- In office ?–?
- Monarch: Emperor Ling of Han

Personal details
- Born: Unknown Zaoyang, Hubei
- Died: c.191
- Occupation: Politician
- Courtesy name: Boqiu (伯求)

He Yong (died c.191), courtesy name Boqiu, was a Chinese politician who lived during the Eastern Han dynasty. He was born in Nanyang and went to the Imperial University in Luoyang where he became known for being a well-connected talent spotter. Exiled to Runan during the Disasters of the Partisan Prohibitions incidents in 169 until 184, he would then serve the Han court. Plotting against Dong Zhuo, he would be arrested on a separate matter and took his own life.

== Early life ==
He Yong was born in Nanyang in Jing province. As a young man in the 160s, he attended the Imperial University, though its status as an educational institution was in decline. However, the University had become a centre for political protest, and he made a reputation for himself as a judge of talent. He made friends with influential figures like Guo Tai (郭泰) and Jia Biao (賈彪), leading talent assessors and opponents of the eunuchs favoured at court. Gaining a reputation, he also made friends with leading anti-eunuch figures at the court, like the Grand Tutor Chen Fan and Director of Retainers Li Ying (李膺).

He also met and admired the future warlord Cao Cao remarking “The Han house will fall. The one who can pacify the empire must be this man.” A useful endorsement for Cao Cao though Carl Leban raises questions about how similar this sort of comment is to other figures about Cao Cao. He would become acquainted with a young Xun Yu and predicted he had the talent to serve a king.

His reputation would be further enhanced as he engaged in the growing trend of vendettas. He Yong had a friend called Yu Weigao (虞偉高) whose father was killed in a vendetta. Yu Weigao planned revenge but fell mortally ill. He Yong visited his friend and, finding him in some distress at being unable to avenge his father, He Yong carried out the killing and brought the head to the Yu family tomb.

== Exile ==
In 168, Chen Fan was made Grand Tutor to the new Emperor Ling and soon he and his allies sought to remove the eunuchs, but their plot was slow, they were outmanoeuvred, and they were destroyed. In 169, the eunuchs persuaded the young Emperor to restart the Prohibitions, purging their opponents including at the Imperial University via charges of faction. Many (including Li Ying) would be killed or driven into exile; all accused were banned from office till 184. He Yong was a prominent enough figure that he had to flee to Runan back in his home Jing Province under a false identity. He Yong was a figure who, wherever he was, built close ties with those from leading families and he quickly built support as he befriended fellow exiles.

He Yong would work with and befriend the wealthy future warlord Yuan Shao to run escape lines for those at risk in the capital, often travelling into the capital Luoyang himself, despite the personal risk. However, this gained He Yong the enmity of the adventurer and future warlord Yuan Shu, Yuan Shao's sibling-turned-cousin and rival. Yuan Shu attacked He Yong's record as a judge of talent, questionable friends and being greedy when others needed help and once even vowed he would kill He Yong but others rebuked Yuan Shu, who was persuaded that it was better to show good treatment to a man like He Yong.

== Service at Han court ==
In 184 with the Yellow Turban Rebellion causing alarm, Emperor Ling agreed to end the Partisan Prohibitions and, with his exile and ban now over, He Yong was recruited into the office of the Excellency of Works. He Yong was an active planner, but others serving the Three Excellencies felt his plans could not be implemented. Upon the death of Emperor Ling, the General-in-Chief He Jin, brother to the Empress Dowager He, recruited He Yong to his service. He Yong became Adjutant of the Northern Army, putting He Yong in charge of discipline of the Northern Army, the professional defence force at the capital that was a key part of He Jin's authority.

In 189, He Jin was assassinated and in the ensuing chaos, the general Dong Zhuo seized power. The new controller of the Han admired He Yong's reputation so offered He Yong a position on his staff as Chief Clerk but He Yong refused on grounds of ill-health. Despite the refusal, Dong Zhuo trusted He Yong, and he helped Zheng Tai, Zhou Bi and Wu Qiong in the selection of officers for the regime. However, He Yong was an ally to his old friend Yuan Shao, helping persuade Dong Zhuo not to kill Yuan Shao after a confrontation but to soothe him with position, from which Yuan Shao would raise forces against Dong Zhuo. Many of those He Yong and his allies recommended would likewise use their position to raise forces against Dong Zhuo.

== Death ==
After Dong Zhuo retreated to Chang'an, many plots were formed against the brutal ruler. He Yong would be involved, but there is some confusion as to which plots he was involved with. The Sanguozhi places him in a plot with Xun You, Zheng Tai, Wu Qiong and Zhong Ji, He Yong's entry in the Hou Hanshu puts him in a plot with the Excellencies Xun Shuang and Wang Yun. On another, unknown matter, He Yong would be arrested and He Yong killed himself to avoid the risk of implicating others involved in the plot.

When Cao Cao took control of the Emperor Xian and the government, moving the court to Xuchang, in 196, Xun Yu sent for the body of his uncle Xun Shuang to be taken to the family tombs. He also had He Yong's body taken to be buried in Xun Shuang's tomb complex in Yingchuan. Howard Goodman suggests this burial shows He Yong and Xun Shuang were very close and Xun Yu wished to provide proper memorial care for He Yong.
