= Shen Pei =

Official serving warlord Yuan Shao (died 204)

- 審配

Attendant Officer (別駕) (under Yuan Shao and then Yuan Shang)
- In office c. 191 – 204
- Monarch: Emperor Xian of Han

Personal details
- Born: Unknown; Qingfeng County, Hebei
- Died: 204; Handan, Hebei
- Occupation: Military general, politician
- Courtesy name: Zhengnan (正南)

Shen Pei (died 204), courtesy name Zhengnan, was a Chinese military general and politician serving under the warlord Yuan Shao during the late Eastern Han dynasty. Xun Yu, an official serving under Yuan Shao's rival Cao Cao, once said that Shen Pei was "strong of will but without tact".

== Life ==
Shen Pei was from Yin'an County (陰安縣), Wei Commandery (魏郡), which is located north of present-day Qingfeng County, Hebei. He started his official career as a subordinate of Han Fu, the Governor of Ji Province. He was known for being stern and upright, but insensitive and tactless, which was why he did not make any significant achievements under Han Fu. In 191, he became a subordinate of the warlord Yuan Shao after Han Fu relinquished his governorship of Ji Province to the latter.

In 200 CE, when the Battle of Guandu broke out between Yuan Shao and his rival Cao Cao, Yuan Shao put Shen Pei in charge of overall coordination and mobilisation of troops. During this time, Shen Pei caught the family members of Xu You, another of Yuan Shao's advisers, committing crimes so he had them arrested. He then reported the incident to Yuan Shao. Xu You, fearing that he had fallen out of Yuan Shao's favour, escaped from Yuan Shao's camp and defected to Cao Cao's side. Xu You then suggested to Cao Cao to attack Yuan Shao's supply depot, resulting in the tide turning against Yuan Shao and consequently leading to Cao Cao's eventual victory. Two of Shen Pei's sons were captured by Cao Cao's forces during the battle. When rumours started spreading that Shen Pei was planning to betray Yuan Shao, Pang Ji, another of Yuan Shao's advisers, spoke up for Shen Pei. As a result, Shen Pei and Pang Ji became good friends.

Yuan Shao died in 202. Before his death, he wanted to designate his youngest son Yuan Shang as the new Governor of Ji Province, but never made it official. This sparked off a conflict between Yuan Shang and Yuan Tan, Yuan Shao's eldest son, as both of them started fighting over the succession. Shen Pei and Pang Ji supported Yuan Shang while other former subordinates of Yuan Shao, such as Guo Tu and Xin Ping, sided with Yuan Tan. Out of fear that Yuan Tan would seize the succession by force, Shen Pei and Pang Ji forged a will in Yuan Shao's name to make Yuan Shang the new Governor of Ji Province.

In 204, Cao Cao took advantage of the internal conflict between the Yuan brothers to attack Ye city, the capital of Ji Province. At the time, Yuan Shang had led his troops to attack Pingyuan (平原) and left Shen Pei and Su You (蘇由) behind to guard Ye city. During the Battle of Ye city, Su You wanted to defect to Cao Cao's side but was discovered so he fled. Cao Cao then defeated Yuan Shang's forces defending the external perimeter of Ye city. When Yuan Shang turned back from Pingyuan and sent his subordinate Li Fu (李孚) to enter Ye city and coordinate with Shen Pei to launch an attack on Cao Cao. However, Cao Cao managed to defeat Yuan Shang and force him to retreat further north. Shen Pei's nephew, Shen Rong (審榮), surrendered to Cao Cao and opened Ye city's gates for the enemy to enter. Before that, Shen Pei had ordered the execution of Xin Pi's entire family after hearing that Xin Pi had defected to Cao Cao's side. After the fall of Ye city, Shen Pei was captured by Cao Cao's forces and executed when he refused to surrender.

== See also ==
- Lists of people of the Three Kingdoms
