= Gao Gan =

Eastern Han official and warlord (died 206)

- 高幹

Inspector of Bing Province (并州刺史)
- In office ?–206
- Monarch: Emperor Xian of Han

Personal details
- Born: Unknown Qi County, Kaifeng, Henan
- Died: 206
- Relations: Gao Ci (grandfather); Gao Hong (uncle); Yuan Shao (uncle); Gao Rou (relative) (Note: Gao Rou's relationship with Gao Gan was recorded differently in different sources. Gao Rou's biography in Sanguozhi recorded that Gan was Rou's elder paternal cousin (从兄). However, Pei Songzhi noted that in Xie Cheng's Houhanshu and Chenliu Qijiu Zhuan, Gan should be Rou's paternal uncle (从父); Pei couldn't determine the correct relation.)
- Parent: Gao Gong (father)
- Occupation: Warlord
- Courtesy name: Yuancai (元才)

Gao Gan (died 206), courtesy name Yuancai, was a minor warlord who lived during the late Eastern Han dynasty of China. He was a maternal nephew and subordinate of the warlord Yuan Shao.

== Life ==
Gao Gan was from an influential family in Yu County (圉縣), Chenliu Commandery (陳留郡), which is around present-day Qi County, Kaifeng, Henan. He was also a maternal nephew of the warlord Yuan Shao, who controlled most of the territories in northern China from the 190s to his death in 202. Gao Gan held the appointment of Inspector (刺史) of Bing Province, which was one of the four provinces in northern China under Yuan Shao's control around 200 CE. He governed Bing Province for about seven years.

In 200 CE, Yuan Shao lost the Battle of Guandu against his rival, Cao Cao, who controlled the Han central government and the figurehead Emperor Xian. After Yuan Shao's defeat, only the troops under Gao Gan's command in Bing Province, numbering about 50,000, were the most organised and highest in morale among all of Yuan Shao's forces.

After Yuan Shao's death in 202, Gao Gan gained support from Guo Yuan and the southern Xiongnu leader Huchuquan to counter Cao Cao's advances into northern China. However, he decided to surrender to Cao Cao in 203 (Note: Sima Guang noted that Zhang Ji's biography in Sanguozhi recorded that Gao Gan surrendered with Huchuquan, which was not the case.) after Guo Yuan's defeat and after internal conflict broke out between Yuan Shao's sons Yuan Tan and Yuan Shang. Cao Cao allowed him to continue serving as the Inspector of Bing Province after his surrender.

Although Gao Gan surrendered to Cao Cao, he was only pretending to do so. In 205, when Cao Cao was away on a campaign against Yuan Shang and the Wuhuan tribes, Gao Gan seized the opportunity to start a rebellion in Bing Province. He took the Administrator of Shangdang Commandery (上黨郡; a commandery in Bing Province) hostage and fortified his defences at Hu Pass (壺關; west of present-day Lucheng, Shanxi). Cao Cao's forces, led by Li Dian and Yue Jin, attacked Gao Gan at Hu Pass but could not overcome him even after some months of siege.

In 206, Cao Cao turned back and personally led his forces to attack Gao Gan. Gao Gan fled from Hu Pass, leaving behind his subordinates Xia Zhao (夏昭) and Deng Sheng (鄧升) to defend the pass, and went to seek help from the Xiongnu. After the Xiongnu refused to help him, Gao Gan headed south towards Jing Province to seek aid from Liu Biao, the provincial governor. However, along the way, Wang Yan (王琰), the Colonel-Director of Retainers (司隸校尉), led his troops to intercept Gao Gan, killed him, and then presented his head to Cao Cao.

== See also ==
- Lists of people of the Three Kingdoms
