= Pang Ji =

Official and adviser to warlord Yuan Shao (died 202)

Pang Ji 逄紀
- Born: Unknown
- Died: 202; Xun County, Henan
- Other names: Yuantu (元圖)
- Occupation: Politician

Pang Ji (Note: His name is often mispronounced as Féng Jì since the character 逢 in modern Chinese is pronounced Féng, however it was likely that the real surname was 逄, pronounced Páng, since the two characters look very similar and Páng was a much more common family name.) (died 202), courtesy name Yuantu, was a Chinese politician serving under the warlord Yuan Shao during the late Eastern Han dynasty of China.

Pang Ji was criticised by Cao Cao's advisor Xun Yu as "brave but heedless of other's opinions." Being very bitter towards his rivals, Pang Ji slandered Tian Feng after Yuan Shao's defeat at the Battle of Guandu and caused Tian Feng to commit suicide. Pang Ji later went on to serve under Yuan Shang, Yuan Shao's successor.

Since Yuan Shang was the youngest of Yuan Shao's sons, there was intense sibling rivalry. Yuan Shao's eldest son Yuan Tan was on the verge of rebellion, and Pang Ji and Shen Pei suggested sending a small army to aid Yuan Tan in the defence against Cao Cao's follow-up attacks in order to resolve the tension. Pang Ji went along as an emissary. However, Yuan Tan was not pleased with the reinforcements and demanded that Yuan Shang send more troops. He was flatly refused by Shen Pei and he killed Pang Ji in anger.

== See also ==
- Lists of people of the Three Kingdoms
- End of the Eastern Han dynasty
