= Yuan Shao =

Han dynasty warlord (died 202)

- 袁紹
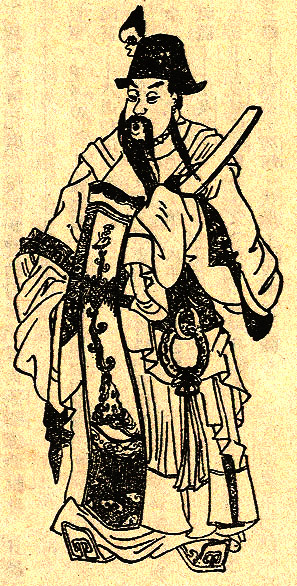
- A Qing dynasty illustration of Yuan Shao

General-in-Chief (大將軍)
- In office 196 – 28 June 202
- Monarch: Emperor Xian of Han

General of the Right (右將軍) (Note: In his Zizhi Tongjian Kaoyi, Sima Guang noted that in Yuan Hong's Annals of the Later Han, Yuan Shao's position was recorded as "General of the Rear"; Tongjian adopted the account found in Fan Ye's Book of the Later Han.)
- In office 195 – 196
- Monarch: Emperor Xian of Han

Governor of Ji Province (冀州牧)
- In office 191 – 28 June 202
- Monarch: Emperor Xian of Han
- Preceded by: Han Fu
- Succeeded by: Yuan Shang

Colonel-Director of Retainers (司隸校尉) (self-appointed)
- In office 190 – 191
- Monarch: Emperor Xian of Han

General of Chariots and Cavalry (車騎將軍) (self-appointed)
- In office 190 – 191
- Monarch: Emperor Xian of Han

Administrator of Bohai (勃海太守)
- In office 190
- Monarch: Emperor Xian of Han

Personal details
- Born: 154 Shangshui County, Henan
- Died: 28 June 202 Handan, Hebei
- Spouses: Lady Liu; at least one other wife and five concubines
- Children: Yuan Tan; Yuan Xi; Yuan Shang
- Parent: Yuan Feng (father)
- Relatives: Yuan An (ancestor); Yuan Ji (half brother); Yuan Shu (half brother); Yang Biao's wife (sister); Gao Gong's wife (sister); Yuan Yi (cousin); Gao Gan (nephew)
- Occupation: Military general, politician, warlord
- Courtesy name: Benchu (本初)
- Peerage: Marquis of Ye (鄴侯)

Military service
- Allegiance: Han Empire; Guandong Coalition; Yuan Shao's forces
- Battles/wars: Massacre of the Eunuchs; Campaign against Dong Zhuo; Battle of Jieqiao; Battle of Fengqiu; Campaign against Yuan Shu; Battle of Guandu

Yuan Shao
- Traditional Chinese: 袁紹
- Simplified Chinese: 袁绍
Transcriptions
Standard Mandarin
- Hanyu Pinyin: Yuán Shào
- Gwoyeu Romatzyh: Yuan Shaw
- Wade–Giles: Yüan^{2} Shao^{4}
- IPA: [ɥɛ̌n ʂâʊ]
Yue: Cantonese
- Yale Romanization: Yùhn Siuh
- Jyutping: Jyun^{4} Siu^{6}
- IPA: [jyn˩ siw˨]
Southern Min
- Tâi-lô: Uân Siō

Yuan Shao (袁紹,; died 28 June 202), courtesy name Benchu (本初), (Note: Benchu was also the era name used by Emperor Zhi of Han for his reign.) was a Chinese military general, politician, and warlord who lived in the late Eastern Han dynasty. He occupied the northern territories of China during the civil wars that occurred towards the end of the Han dynasty. He was also an elder half-brother of Yuan Shu, a warlord who controlled the Huai River region, though the two were not on good terms with each other.

One of the most powerful warlords of his time, Yuan Shao spearheaded a coalition of warlords against Dong Zhuo, who held Emperor Xian hostage in the imperial capital, Luoyang, but failed due to internal disunity. In 200, he launched a campaign against his rival Cao Cao but was defeated at the Battle of Guandu. He died of illness two years later in Ye. His eventual failure despite his illustrious family background and geographical advantages was commonly blamed on his indecisiveness and inability to heed the advice of his advisors.

== Family background ==
Yuan Shao was born in Ruyang County (汝陽縣), Runan Commandery, which is in present-day Shangshui County, Henan. His family had for over four generations been a prominent force in the Han civil service, having produced numerous members in high positions since the first century CE. Descended from Yuan An, who served during the reign of Emperor Zhang, Yuan Shao's exact parentage was the source of some controversy, being one of the primary points of contention between himself and his half-brother, or cousin, Yuan Shu. Yuan Shao was a son of Yuan Feng (袁逢) and the eldest sibling, supposedly to the ire of Yuan Shu. Both Yuan Shao and Yuan Shu are recognised as great-grandsons of Yuan An, as recorded in Wang Chen's Book of Wei (魏書).

Yuan Shao's mother was originally a servant of Yuan Feng. Since Yuan Feng lacked male heirs, the birth of Yuan Shao elevated his mother to the status of a concubine. The Records of the Three Kingdoms contend that Yuan Shao was in fact an older cousin of Yuan Shu, and was adopted by the elder brother of Yuan Feng, Yuan Cheng (袁成), who also lacked male heirs. The act of adopting Yuan Shao would have infuriated Yuan Shu, because his own mother, a concubine of Yuan Feng, held a higher status than that of Yuan Shao's mother; however, by Yuan Cheng's adoption of Yuan Shao, Yuan Shu was no longer the highest ranked male of his generation of the Yuan family. Yuan Shao enjoyed more privileges than Yuan Shu, despite the latter being a blood-related member of the clan.

When Yuan Shao and Yuan Shu became involved in disputes later, Yuan Shu used Yuan Shao's mother as an excuse to claim that he was not a "true son" of the Yuan family. When compared to Yuan Shu, Yuan Shao had a more serious appearance and respected men of talent regardless of their background; as such, he was welcomed by many since his childhood, including Cao Cao and Zhang Miao.

== Service under the Han dynasty (c.169 –189) ==
During Yuan Shao's early life, he participated in saving some of the "partisans" from death or other terrible fates during the second of the Disasters of Partisan Prohibitions. One such "partisan" was He Yong, whom Yuan Shao befriended after he escaped to Runan and became close with. When the second of the Disasters of Partisan Prohibitions began, He Yong often secretly entered Luoyang, where he discussed plans with Yuan Shao on how to help the "partisans". For the "partisans" who were destitute, the plans were to provide material help. For the "partisans" who were imprisoned, the plans were to work within the bureaucracy so that the partisans may escape. After he entered the civil service, Yuan Shao initially served as an aide to General-in-Chief He Jin, who deeply trusted him.

After the death of Emperor Ling in May 189, He Jin and Yuan Shao plotted to eliminate the eunuch faction, but Empress Dowager He was against their idea. He Jin then summoned Dong Zhuo to lead troops into the imperial capital, Luoyang, to pressure the empress dowager. The eunuchs became fearful and they forged an edict in the empress dowager's name, summoning He Jin into the inner palace. Yuan Shao cautioned He Jin, reminding him that he should order an attack on the eunuchs instead of entering the palace. After He Jin refused to accept his advice thrice, Yuan Shao and Yuan Shu led 200 elite troops to wait outside. On 22 September 189, inside the palace, He Jin was ambushed and assassinated by the eunuchs, who tossed his severed head over the wall. He Jin's angered followers set fire to the palace and charged in, slaughtering every person (except females) without facial hair; to the extreme that many young men without facial hair had to show their genitals to avoid being mistaken for eunuchs and killed. Over 2,000 people were killed in the massacre, while the young Emperor Shao and Prince of Chenliu (future Emperor Xian) escaped during the chaos. The resulting power vacuum provided Dong Zhuo, who found and rescued the emperor and prince, with an opportunity to seize control of the imperial capital when he arrived.

Dong Zhuo then discussed with Yuan Shao about his plan to depose Emperor Shao and replace him with the Prince of Chenliu, but Yuan Shao disagreed. Relations between the two deteriorated and Yuan Shao fled from Luoyang to Ji Province (present day southern Hebei). At the time, Yuan Shao just got out through the city gates of Luoyang, Dong Zhuo thought about sending men after him, but Zhou Bi, Wu Qiong and He Yong secretly helped Yuan Shao by convincing Dong Zhuo to let him go. As suggested by the three men, Dong Zhuo appointed Yuan Shao as the administrator of Bohai Commandery in a bid to appease him.

== Coalition against Dong Zhuo (190–191) ==
=== Sun Jian's advancement ===
By early 190, however, Yuan became openly hostile. A coalition of regional officials and commanders from the eastern provinces, including Cao Cao, Yuan Shu, Han Fu, Zhang Miao and Bao Xin, formed up behind him in a campaign to oust Dong Zhuo. Yuan Shao declared himself General of Chariots and Cavalry (車騎將軍) and camped at Henei (河內), near a fort on the Yellow River just north of Luoyang. On 10 May 190, Dong Zhuo ordered the execution of all members of the Yuan clan in Luoyang; he then sent out emissaries with imperial edicts ordering the regional officials to disband. However, members of the coalition listened to Yuan Shao, and had all the emissaries executed instead (except Han Rong). Dong Zhuo then sent Hu Zhen, Lü Bu and Hua Xiong to deter the coalition vanguard led by Sun Jian. Despite initial success, Sun was able to capitalise on the internal conflict between Hu Zhen and Lü Bu and defeated them at Yangren. After that loss, Dong Zhuo decided to move the imperial capital to Chang'an, where his home base of Liang Province was nearby. A year later, Dong Zhuo burnt Luoyang to the ground and withdrew to the west with the mass of refugees. Although lacking a logistical base, Sun Jian and Cao Cao requested to pursue Dong Zhuo's retreating force, but Yuan Shao and other members largely disagreed with their opinion. Sun Jian was ordered to rendezvous with Yuan Shu, so Cao Cao led his own men to go on the pursuit alone, and was soundly defeated by Dong Zhuo's subordinate, Xu Rong.

=== Dissolution ===
During this time, Yuan Shao and Han Fu had intended to establish the legitimacy of the coalition by declaring Liu Yu, the governor of You Province (present day northern Hebei), the new emperor to replace Emperor Xian. However, believing that it would be faithless to Emperor Xian for him to accept, Liu Yu declined the offer. When the scene of the ruined capital coming into their eyes, the disunited leaders of the coalition realised that the Han dynasty was coming to an end, and started planning on strengthening their position, and soon returned to their respective home bases.

== Unifying northern China (191–199) ==
=== Acquisition and consolidation of Ji Province (191) ===
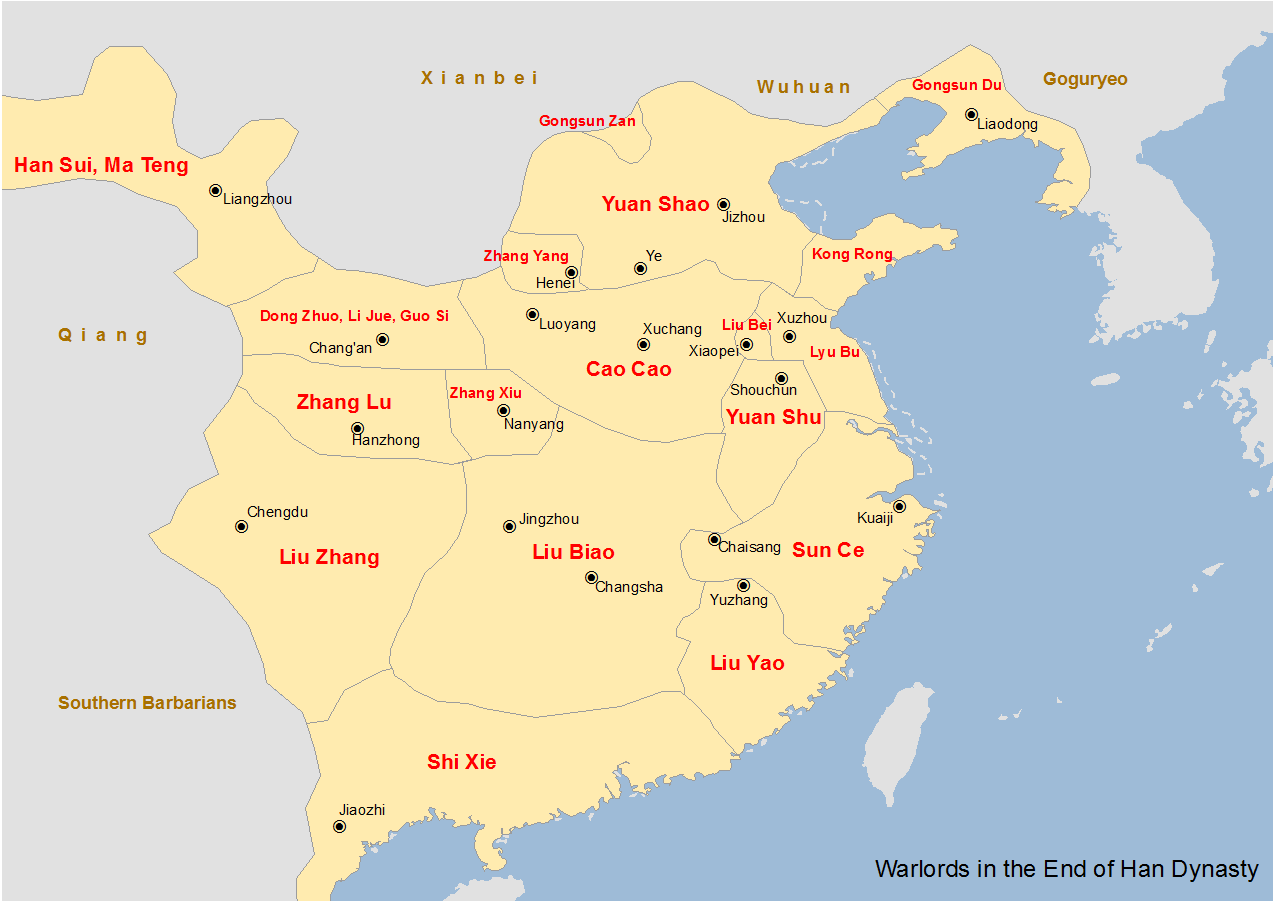
Map showing the major warlords of the Han dynasty in the 190s, including Yuan Shao

As many volunteers from different provinces had flocked to join Yuan Shao, Bohai Commandery would be far from sufficient to supply his army. Thus, Pang Ji suggested to Yuan Shao to form a secret alliance with the warlord Gongsun Zan and incite the latter to attack Han Fu's Ji Province. Facing an imminent attack from Gongsun Zan, Han Fu was terrified so he listened to Yuan Shao's lobbyists, Gao Gan (Yuan Shao's nephew) and Xun Chen, to give up the governorship of Ji Province to Yuan Shao in order to drive back Gongsun Zan. Yuan Shao then began to build a warlord state from Ye, the capital of Ji Province. In order to curtail Yuan Shu's sphere of influence, Yuan Shao formed an alliance with Cao Cao and Zhang Miao, and named his follower, Zhou Yu (周喁) as the Inspector of Yu Province, a title to which Sun Jian had already been entitled, and sent him to attack Sun Jian's territories in Yu Province while the latter was on his way back from Luoyang. In response, Yuan Shu allied with Gongsun Zan and Tao Qian, and ordered Sun Jian to fight his half-brother.

Although Zhou Yu managed to defeat the forces of Sun Jian in the Battle of Yangcheng, he lost to Sun Jian in the following battles. The first battles between the brothers ended in Yuan Shu's favour: he had engaged and defeated Yuan Shao's forces in both Yangcheng and Jiujiang, restored the position in Yingchuan Commandery under Sun Jian, and eliminated Zhou Yu as a threat once and for all although Jiujiang was not yet conquered. For Yuan Shao, on the other hand, the situation was extremely difficult: besides the failure in the south, he was also under threat from Gongsun Zan, who held Yuan Shao responsible for the death of his cousin Gongsun Yue (公孫越) in battle and formally declared war against him, rejecting all of Yuan Shao's protestations of goodwill. This led to the clash between Yuan Shao and Gongsun in the Battle of Jieqiao.

The Battle of Yangcheng, being the first move in the struggle between the two Yuans, marked the beginning of a new stage in the confusion of wars which brought about the end of the Han dynasty. This internecine struggle confirmed the undoing of the alliance against Dong Zhuo as the warlords of the North China Plain started to battle each other for the ultimate dominion of China.

In order to focus on the conflicts with Gongsun Zan, Yuan Shao entered into a general alliance with Liu Biao against Yuan Shu. In the winter of that year, Yuan Shao defeated Gongsun Zan's elite cavalry at the Battle of Jieqiao with the use of massed crossbowmen. The Han imperial court issued an edict ordering Yuan Shao and Gongsun Zan to cease fire. Yuan Shao then returned to Ye and started targeting the Heishan bandits, who had been causing trouble in Ji Province. With temporary aid from Lü Bu, Yuan Shao managed to defeat the Heishan bandits despite suffering heavy casualties. In any case, Yuan Shao succeeded in drastically reducing the threat posed by the Heishan bandits to his western flank.

=== Conquest of Qing Province (192–196) ===
Despite warnings from Ju Shou that the move could sow seeds for future trouble, Yuan Shao insisted on sending his first-born son, Yuan Tan, away to "govern" Qing Province.

In subsequent years, Yuan Shao achieved considerable success in consolidating his domain. At the same time, Yuan Tan also achieved exceptional success on expanding his territories in Qing Province, driving out Gongsun Zan's general Tian Kai in 193 and defeating Beihai chancellor Kong Rong in 196.

=== Refusal to host the emperor (195–196) ===
In 195, Ju Shou suggested to Yuan Shao to welcome Emperor Xian to Ji Province so he could effectively control the Han central government and use the emperor as a figurehead to enhance his legitimacy. However, Guo Tu and Chunyu Qiong opposed this move under the faulty logic that if Yuan Shao were to do so, he would have to yield to Emperor Xian on key decisions. Yuan Shao, valuing his autonomy, listened to Guo Tu and Chunyu Qiong and let the opportunity pass by. (Note: However, Yuan Shao's biography in Sanguozhi recorded that it was Guo Tu who suggested to Yuan Shao to take the emperor in. When annotating Yuan Shao's biography in Sanguozhi, Pei Songzhi cited the Xiandi Zhuan, which like the Houhanshu also recorded that Ju Shou was the one who suggested taking in Emperor Xian. Pei then noted that the account in Xiandi Zhuan contradicted the account found in Yuan Shao's biography in Sanguozhi. In vol.03 of Zizhi Tongjian Kaoyi, Sima Guang noted that Tongjian adopted the account found in Yuan Shao's biography in Fan Ye's Houhanshu.) In contrast, his would-be rival, Cao Cao used the opportunity to welcome Emperor Xian to his base in Xuchang, where the new imperial capital was established.

In 196, the Han imperial court, under Cao Cao's control, awarded Yuan Shao the appointment of Grand Commandant. However, Yuan Shao rejected the appointment because Grand Commandant ranked below General-in-Chief, the position held by Cao Cao. As a result, Cao Cao gave up his position and offered it to Yuan Shao, who readily accepted it. Yuan Shao was also enfeoffed as the Marquis of Ye.

=== Annihilation of Gongsun Zan (198–199) ===
In 198, Yuan Shao advanced against Gongsun Zan and encircled his remaining force at Yijing (present-day Xiong County, Hebei). By early 199, Yuan Shao had completely defeated Gongsun Zan at the Battle of Yijing and held absolute power over the four provinces north of the Yellow River. Then, after establishing an alliance with the Wuhuan tribes on the northern frontier, Yuan Shao turned his attention to Cao Cao, who had consolidated his own power base to the south of the Yellow River.

== Guandu Campaign (199–201) ==
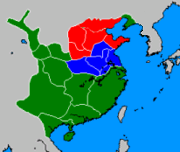
China's provinces in 199: Yuan Shao Cao Cao Others

Both sides made preparations for a decisive battle. Towards the end of 199, both sides had already engaged in skirmishes at Liyang (northwest of present-day Xun County, Henan), a major crossing point of the Yellow River. Cao Cao prepared his defences around Guandu (northeast of present-day Zhongmu County, Henan), slightly south of the river. When Liu Bei defected from Cao Cao in the first month of 200 and planted a foothold in Xu Province, Cao Cao left his northern front exposed to Yuan Shao and turned east to deal with Liu Bei. Tian Feng urged Yuan Shao to seize the opportunity to attack Cao Cao while he was away, but Yuan Shao refused to launch an all-out offensive. Instead, he sent small detachments to harass his enemy. Yu Jin, the general appointed by Cao Cao to defend Yan Ford, defeated Yuan Shao's detachments.

Shortly after Cao Cao returned to Guandu, Yuan Shao had Chen Lin draft a document condemning Cao Cao in what was essentially a declaration of war. He then marched his main army towards the forward base of Liyang north of the Yellow River. At the time, Yuan Shao's main veteran army boasted of numbers over 100,000, supplemented with hundreds of thousands of less skilled militia units. Heavily outnumbering Cao Cao and holding large cavalry force, Yuan Shao's initial attacks almost overwhelmed his enemy's positions. It is recorded in the Records of the Three Kingdoms that Cao Cao on several occasions considered relinquishing his position, and consulted his chief strategist, Xun Yu on that decision, which Xun strongly opposed and further encouraged Cao to hold on. Following an unexpected defection of one of Yuan Shao's strategists and personal friends, Xu You, Cao Cao received confidential information on the whereabouts of Yuan Shao's food storage. In late 200, Cao Cao and Yue Jin led a strike force to attack Yuan Shao's supply depot at Wuchao and burnt it down, inflicting severe damage on the morale of Yuan Shao's army. Two of Yuan Shao's officers, Zhang He and Gao Lan, immediately defected to Cao Cao's side once they got wind of what happened in Wuchao, and many others followed suit. Yuan Shao was unable to stop the trend and fled north across the Yellow River with only hundreds of loyalists.

Yuan Shao's first major defeat was also a decisive one. Thereafter, he lost the advantage over Cao Cao and never regained it. In 201, Cao Cao defeated him again at the Battle of Cangting and proceeded to capture several of Yuan Shao's territories in Ji Province.

== Failure to turn the tide and eventual demise (201–202) ==
After the Battle of Cangting, Cao Cao's exhausted troops returned to the south for a rest. Meanwhile, Yuan Shao was able to reorganise his defeated armies to settle the rebellions in his own domain, soon reestablishing order and restored the status quo ante bellum. Yuan Shao had three sons, and he favoured his third son, Yuan Shang, due to his good looks, and both Yuan Tan and Yuan Shang were his choice for succession. However, Yuan was never able to finalise his decision regarding who should succeed him before he died on 28 June 202, leaving his domain to be contested by his sons and Cao Cao.

Immediately after Yuan Shao's death, Shen Pei and Pang Ji, two influential advisers, supported Yuan Shang and pushed for him to succeed Yuan Shao, despite opposition from Yuan Tan. Yuan Shao's wife, Lady Liu, supported Yuan Shang, and Yuan Tan could not do anything to change the outcome when he rushed back from Qing Province. Then, Lady Liu, being in control of the Yuan household after her husband's death, killed Yuan Shao's other five consorts out of jealousy and disfigured them. True to Ju Shou's previous warning, chaos ensued within Yuan Shao's forces. Cao Cao exploited the internal turmoil within the Yuan family to his advantage and completely eliminated Yuan Shao's heirs and remnants by 207.

Cao Cao paid his respects at Yuan Shao's tomb after conquering Ye city in 204. He wept bitterly for his old friend in front of his followers and gave Yuan Shao's family consolatory gifts and a government pension.

== Family ==
- Ancestors:
  - Yuan An, great-great-grandfather, served as Excellency over the Masses, and Excellency of Works
  - Yuan Jing (袁京), great-grandfather, served as Excellency of Works
  - Yuan Tang (袁湯), grandfather, served as Excellency over the Masses, Excellency of Works, and Grand Commandant
- Father: Yuan Feng (袁逢), served as Excellency of Works
- Siblings:
  - Yuan Ji (袁基), elder half-brother, served as Minister Coachman
  - Yuan Shu, younger half-brother, warlord, declared himself Emperor of Zhong later
- Spouses:
  - Principal wife, bore Yuan Tan and Yuan Xi
  - Lady Liu (劉夫人), bore Yuan Shang
  - Five other concubines, all killed by Lady Liu
- Children:
  - Yuan Tan, eldest son, waged war on Yuan Shang after his father's death, killed by Cao Cao
  - Yuan Xi, second son, moved to You Province after Yuan Shao's death, later fled to Liaodong with Yuan Shang, killed by Gongsun Kang
  - Yuan Shang, third son, Yuan Shao's successor, waged war on Yuan Tan after his father's death, fled to Liaodong with Yuan Xi, killed by Gongsun Kang
- Relatives:
  - Yuan Wei (袁隗), uncle, served as Excellency over the Masses, and Grand Tutor
  - Yuan She, clansman
  - Yuan Cheng (袁成), uncle
  - Yuan Yi, elder cousin, served as Prefect of Chang'an, and Inspector of Yang Province
  - Yuan Xu (袁敘), younger cousin
  - Yuan Yin (袁胤), younger cousin, served as Administrator of Danyang
  - Yuan Manlai (袁滿來), cousin
  - Yuan Yida (袁懿達), cousin
  - Yuan Renda (袁仁達), cousin
  - Gao Gan, nephew

== In Romance of the Three Kingdoms ==
Xianru Zheng published an analysis of Yuan Shao's character and effectiveness as a leader as depicted in the classic Chinese novel Romance of the Three Kingdoms. He begins by referencing a discussion by Cao Cao and Liu Bei in which Cao Cao asks Liu Bei to name a hero. Liu suggests Yuan Shao but Cao Cao disagrees: Liu Bei: "Well, Yuan Shao then. The highest offices of state have been held in his family for four generations, and his clients are many in the empire. He is firmly posted in Jizhou, and he commands the services of many able people. Surely he is one." Cao Cao: "A bully, but a coward. He is fond of grandiose schemes, but is devoid of decision. He makes for great things but grudges the necessary sacrifice. He loses sight of everything else in view of a little present advantage. He is not one." Xianru Zheng agrees with Cao Cao's assessment and he describes many example episodes to make the point.

Yuan Shao dangerously confronted Dong Zhuo when Dong announced his plan to depose the Emperor Shao and set up the young Prince Chenliu as a puppet emperor. He fled to Ji Province but was placated when Dong had him appointed as Chief of Bohai County. However, he again turned against Dong when Cao Cao sent him a forged edict calling for the overthrow of Dong Zhou. Cao Cao made him leader of a coalition of war lords in a campaign to deposed Dong. However, the effort failed and the coalition dissolved. Cao Cao had urged the members to continue the fight but the other warlords, including Yuan Shao, declined to join him, leaving him to launch an unsuccessful attack on Dong alone. Nevertheless, Cao Cao was eventually able to take the Emperor under his protection after Dong was assassinated by Lü Bu, Cao Cao and Yuan Shao then became military rivals.

One of the most telling examples of Yuan Shao's indecisiveness noted by Xianru Zheng was his failure to take advantage of an excellent opportunity to defeat Cao Cao. Cao Cao was launching a revenge campaign against Liu Bei and Liu Bei sent an emissary, Sun Qian, to Yuan Shao to ask for help. He found Yuan Shao in disarray and in a melancholy mood. When the proposal was put to him, he stated that his son was very ill and he was too distraught to discuss such things. Yuan Shao's wise advisor Tian Feng tried to persuade Yuan Shao to take advantage of the unique opportunity, to no avail. After the meeting Tian Feng exclaimed: "It is such a pity! Just as a unique opportunity presents itself, everything is spoiled by the illness of a child!".

The depiction of the Battle of Guandu was another prime example. In this case Yuan Shou launched an attack on Cao Cao against the advice of Tian Feng. Yuan Shou even jailed his advisor for explaining the danger. Cao Cao, a much craftier general, burned his granaries and decimated Yuan Shou's superior force. Yuan Shao unjustifiably assumed that Tian Feng would gloat over his loss and determined to execute him. Tian Feng, knowing this would be the case, committed suicide. Yuan Shou subsequently died in remorse. His sons then strove against each other for succession and were killed in the turmoil that followed.

The novel concludes the Yuan Shou narrative with a poem which summarizes his life and character:

Born of a line of nobles famous for generations,
He himself in his youth was wayward always and headstrong,
Vainly he called to his side generals skilled and courageous,
Gathered beneath his banner countless legions of soldiers,
For he was timid at heart, a lamb dressed as a tiger,
Merely a cowardly chicken, phoenix-feathered but spurless.
Pitiful was the fate of his house; for when he departed
Brother with brother strove and quarrels arose in the household.

— Luo Guanzhong (c. 1300-1400), translated by C. H. Brewitt Taylor (1925)

== In popular culture ==
Yuan Shao is featured as a playable character in Koei's Dynasty Warriors and Warriors Orochi video game series. He also appears in all instalments of Koei's Romance of the Three Kingdoms strategy game series. He also has a minor role in Koei's Kessen II. Yuan Shao also appears as a playable faction leader in the Creative Assembly title Total War: Three Kingdoms. He appears in Team Ninja's historical fantasy Action RPG Wo Long: Fallen Dynasty as a tragic villain with some elements of his half-brother Yuan Shu attributted to him.

He plays a major role in the Three Kingdoms television series as a recurring character.

== See also ==
- Lists of people of the Three Kingdoms
