= Yuan Tan =

Chinese general and warlord (died 205)

- 袁譚

General of Chariots and Cavalry (車騎將軍) (self-appointed)
- In office 202 – 203
- Monarch: Emperor Xian of Han

Inspector of Qing Province (青州刺史)
- In office ? – 202
- Monarch: Emperor Xian of Han

Personal details
- Born: Unknown
- Died: c.February 205 Nanpi County, Hebei
- Children: one daughter
- Parent: Yuan Shao (father)
- Relatives: Yuan Xi (half-brother); Yuan Shang (half-brother)
- Occupation: General, politician, warlord
- Courtesy name: Xiansi (顯思)

Yuan Tan (died c. February 205), courtesy name Xiansi, was a Chinese military general, politician, and warlord who was the eldest son of Yuan Shao, a warlord who occupied much of northern China during the late Eastern Han dynasty. After Yuan Shao's death, Yuan Tan engaged his younger brother, Yuan Shang, in a power struggle over their father's territories. He sought help from his father's rival, Cao Cao, and defeated Yuan Shang with Cao's help. However, the alliance between Yuan Tan and Cao Cao was eventually broken and Yuan was defeated and killed in the Battle of Nanpi by Cao Cao's troops.

== Pacifying Qing Province ==
In 193, Yuan Shao appointed Yuan Tan to the position of Inspector of Qing Province, in opposition to Gongsun Zan's officer Tian Kai. Tan left Ye to station at Pingyuan; however, when he arrived Qing Province, the Yuan forces only controlled one city within the province, and Yuan Tan's position was only a commandant. He fought Tian Kai to a truce in 193. Still, Yuan Tan managed to seize Beihai State from Kong Rong in the east in 196, and expelled Tian Kai in the north to expand his domain in the area. Yuan Tan was quite successful on his expansion, and was welcomed by the common people of the Province. Although adept in military, Yuan Tan was inept at civil matters – the officials he picked plundered the countryside and accepted bribery, and the taxes collected were below one third of the estimated tax revenue.

== Internal conflict within Yuan Shao's forces ==
In 200, Yuan Tan accompanied his father at the Battle of Guandu against Cao Cao. Yuan Shao, however, was defeated in the conflict and fell sick shortly after returning to his base city of Ye. All along, Yuan Shao had intended to pass on his legacy to his youngest son Yuan Shang, who was favoured by Yuan Shao for his good looks, but the successorship had not been clearly established by the time Yuan Shao died in June 202.

Many officials intended to make Yuan Tan the successor according to seniority of the heirs, but Shen Pei and Pang Ji, two influential advisors, supported Yuan Shang and pushed for the latter to succeed Yuan Shao. When Yuan Tan rushed back from his duty elsewhere, he could not revert the situation, the only thing he could do was to proclaim himself "General of Chariots and Cavalry" (車騎將軍), his father's former title.

In autumn of the same year, Cao Cao launched an offensive against the Yuan brothers. Yuan Tan allied with his brother and stationed his troops in Liyang (northeast of present-day Xun County, Henan) against the attack but his request for more troops was turned down by Yuan Shang, who feared his elder brother would take over military control. Yuan Shang then left Shen Pei to defend Ye and personally led a force to Liyang to assist in the defense. For half a year the battle went on, but the Yuan brothers eventually gave up the city after a major defeat, and retreated to Ye.

== Alliance with Cao Cao ==
Cao Cao's advisor Guo Jia then suggested that the Yuan brothers would fight between themselves in the absence of an external enemy. Cao Cao took the counsel and withdrew his troops to attack Liu Biao in Jing Province (present-day Hubei and Hunan). Meanwhile, Yuan Tan and Yuan Shang indeed battled each other. After suffering initial defeats, Yuan Tan retreated to Pingyuan and sent out an emissary seeking to ally with Cao Cao. Cao Cao agreed, but his actual intention of allying with Yuan Tan was to make it easier to defeat Yuan Shang and Yuan Xi, and with them gone, he would then eliminate Yuan Tan easily. On the other hand, however, Yuan Tan was trying to make use of the alliance to strengthen his position. He contacted two of his father's former generals, who had surrendered to Cao Cao, and gave them seals of authority, in hope they would defect to him at the right time after Yuan Shang was taken care of. But his plan was sensed by Cao Cao, who even promised to marry a daughter to Yuan Tan in order to let his guard down.

== Death ==
Yuan Shang soon led a force to attack his brother again but retreated after he had heard the news of Cao Cao's siege on Ye. His returning force tried to converge with that in the city but the attempt was foiled. The defeated Yuan Shang then escaped to Zhongshan, and was attacked by a vengeful Yuan Tan. Merging Yuan Shang's surrendered troops into his own, Yuan Tan violated the alliance with Cao Cao by taking Ganling (present-day Qinghe County, Hebei), Anping County, Bohai Commandery (vicinity of present-day Cangzhou, Hebei) and Hejian into his realm. Cao Cao soon turned his force against Yuan Tan, who retreated to Nanpi. In 205, Yuan Tan was eventually defeated and killed in action in the Battle of Nanpi against Cao Cao.

== In Romance of the Three Kingdoms ==
In Chapter 33 of the 14th-century historical novel Romance of the Three Kingdoms, Yuan Tan was said to have sent Xin Ping as an emissary to Cao Cao while besieged in Nanpi to seek surrender but was declined. When Xin returned, Yuan accused him of treason since his brother Xin Pi served in Cao Cao's camp. The undue accusation angered Xin so much that he soon died, much to Yuan's regret.

The next morning, Yuan placed the commoners, who were hastily armed during the night, in front of his troops and marched into battle with Cao Cao outside the city. Yuan was subsequently killed in battle by Cao Hong.

== See also ==
- Lists of people of the Three Kingdoms
