= Yuan Shang =

Warlord Yuan Shao's third son and successor (died 207)

- 袁尚

Governor of Ji Province (冀州牧)
- In office 202 – 207
- Monarch: Emperor Xian of Han
- Preceded by: Yuan Shao

Personal details
- Born: Unknown
- Died: 207; Liaoyang, Liaoning
- Parents: Yuan Shao (father); Lady Liu (mother)
- Relatives: Yuan Tan (half-brother); Yuan Xi (brother)
- Occupation: Military general, politician, warlord
- Courtesy name: Xianfu (顯甫)

Yuan Shang (died c. December 207), courtesy name Xianfu, was a Chinese military general, politician, and warlord who lived during the late Eastern Han dynasty of China. He was the third son and successor of the warlord Yuan Shao. In the 14th-century historical novel Romance of the Three Kingdoms, Yuan Shang was described as "strong but arrogant", and he was his father's favourite son.

== Usurpation of Yuan Shao's legacy ==
It is documented in the Records of the Three Kingdoms and Dianlüè that Yuan Shao favoured Yuan Shang due to his good looks, and he preferred Yuan Shang to be his choice for succession. However, Yuan Shao was never able to finalise on his decision regarding who should succeed him as the Governor of Ji Province. Following Yuan Shao's death in 202, many of his followers suggested that his eldest son, Yuan Tan, should assume control of the Yuan family's assets, as tradition dictated, but Yuan Shang and his supporters would not yield. Apprehensive that Yuan Tan's succession would harm their future, Lady Liu who was his mother, Shen Pei and Pang Ji, two influential advisers, supported Yuan Shang and pushed for him to succeed Yuan Shao. The succession dispute ended with Yuan Shao's five concubines being murdered by Lady Liu, shortly after the entire family of those concubines was executed to avoid revenge in the future. When Yuan Tan rushed back from his duty elsewhere, he could not revert the situation so instead he appointed himself General of Chariots and Cavalry (車騎將軍). The relationship between Yuan Tan and Yuan Shang greatly deteriorated due to this event.

Cao Cao, the warlord who defeated Yuan Shao at the Battle of Guandu, resumed his offensive to the north and attacked the Yuan brothers in 202. Yuan Tan stationed his troops in Liyang (northeast of present-day Xun County, Henan) against the attack, but his request for more troops was turned down by his brother, who feared Yuan Tan would take over military control. Yuan Shang then left Shen Pei to defend Ye and personally led a force to Liyang to assist in the defences. The war dragged on for about half a year until Yuan Shang's forces suffered a major defeat outside the city gates. Apprehensive of being locked up inside the city, Yuan Shang fled under the cover of night, but was trailed to Ye, where Cao Cao took all the wheat around.

== Fighting with Yuan Tan and Cao Cao ==
Cao Cao's adviser, Guo Jia, suggested that the Yuan brothers would fight between themselves in the absence of an external enemy. Cao Cao accepted Guo Jia's counsel and withdrew his troops to attack Liu Biao in Jing Province (covering present-day Hubei and Hunan). Meanwhile, Yuan Shang battled with his brother, and forced Yuan Tan to flee to Pingyuan (平原), where Yuan Shang laid siege. Since Yuan Shang's attack was so intense, Yuan Tan had no other way but to send out Xin Pi to seek alliance with Cao Cao. Cao Cao agreed and even arranged a marriage between one of his sons and Yuan Tan's daughter.

As Cao Cao was moving north, Yuan Shang was forced to lift the siege and returned to Ye, but en route to Ye, Yuan Shang was defeated and fled to Zhongshan. The brothers Lü Kuang (呂曠) and Lü Xiang (呂翔), who served under Yuan Shang, surrendered to Cao Cao and were enfeoffed as marquises. While Cao Cao was laying siege to Ye, Yuan Tan took the opportunity to attack Yuan Shang, and forced the latter to seek refuge alongside his second brother, Yuan Xi, who at that time was the Inspector of You Province. During Yuan Shang's stay in You Province, a mutiny broke out, and the two brothers were then forced to flee to Liaoxi, where the Wuhuan tribes resided. In 207, the Yuan brothers, along with the Wuhuan leader Tadun, fought at the Battle of White Wolf Mountain against Cao Cao. During the battle, the unit of Tadun was surprise-attacked by Cao Cao's vanguard, Zhang Liao, and the allied forces was soon defeated after the capture of Tadun.

== Death ==
This time Yuan Shang and Yuan Xi fled to Liaodong, where they planned to take shelter under the warlord Gongsun Kang. However, they were betrayed by Gongsun Kang, who executed them and sent their heads to Cao Cao.

== See also ==
- Lists of people of the Three Kingdoms
