= Bohai Commandery =

Historical political subdivision in China

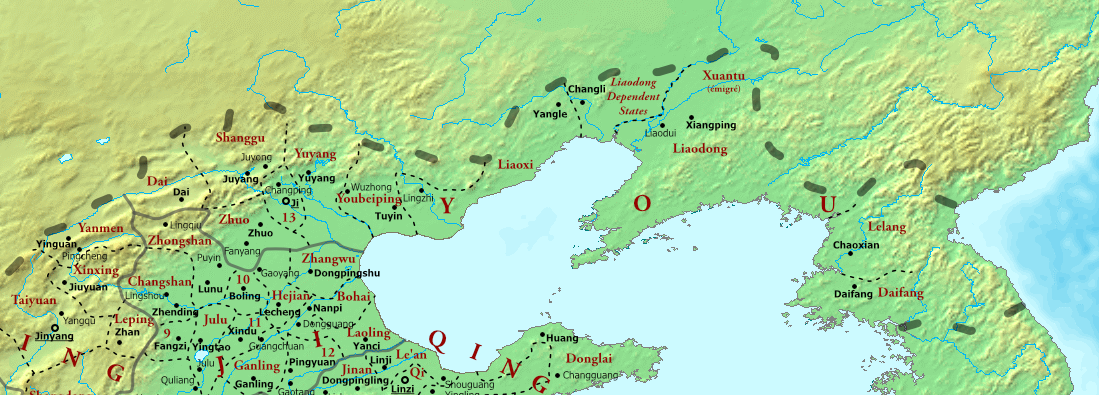
Commanderies of Youzhou in Jian'an Era (219 BC)

Bohai Commandery (勃海郡 or 渤海郡) was a commandery of China from Han dynasty to Tang dynasty. It was centered around modern southern Hebei province.

The commandery was established during Emperor Gaozu of Han's reign. In Western Han, it administered 26 counties, including Fuyang (浮陽), Yangxin (陽信), Dongguang (東光), Fucheng (阜城), Qiantong (千童), Chonghe (重合), Nanpi (南皮), Ding (定), Zhangwu (章武), Zhongyi (中邑), Gaocheng (高成), Gaole (高樂), Canhu (參戶), Chengping (成平), Liu (柳), Linle (臨樂), Dongpingshu (東平舒), Chongping (重平), Anci (安次), Xiushi (脩市), Wen'an (文安), Jingcheng (景成), Shuzhou (束州), Jiancheng (建成), Zhangxiang (章鄉) and Puling (蒲領). The population in 2 AD was 905,119, or 256,377 households. During the Eastern Han dynasty, the seat was moved to Nanpi. By 140 AD, the number of counties had decreased to 8, including Nanpi, Gaocheng, Chonghe, Fuyang, Dongguang, Zhangwu, Yangxin and Xiu (脩, formerly part of Xindu Commandery), and the number of households to 132,389. According to the Book of Jin, the commandery had 40,000 households in 280 AD. In Northern Wei, the commandery was renamed to Cangshui (滄水) during Emperor Taiwu's reign, but the name was changed back in 497. The commandery was abolished in early Sui dynasty.

In Sui and Tang dynasties, Bohai Commandery became an alternative name of Cang Prefecture (滄州), which lied on the coast of the Bohai Sea, and from which modern Cangzhou derives its name. In 741 AD, it consisted of 7 counties, and the population was 825,705, or 124,024 households according to Tang official census figures.
