= AD 200 =

200 in various calendars
- Gregorian calendar: 200; CC
- Ab urbe condita: 953
- Assyrian calendar: 4950
- Balinese saka calendar: 121–122
- Bengali calendar: −394 – −393
- Berber calendar: 1150
- Buddhist calendar: 744
- Burmese calendar: −438
- Byzantine calendar: 5708–5709
- Chinese calendar: 己卯年 (Earth Rabbit); 2897 or 2690 — to — 庚辰年 (Metal Dragon); 2898 or 2691
- Coptic calendar: −84 – −83
- Discordian calendar: 1366
- Ethiopian calendar: 192–193
- Hebrew calendar: 3960–3961
- Hindu calendars
- Vikram Samvat: 256–257
- Shaka Samvat: 121–122
- Kali Yuga: 3300–3301
- Holocene calendar: 10200
- Iranian calendar: 422 BP – 421 BP
- Islamic calendar: 435 BH – 434 BH
- Javanese calendar: 77–78
- Julian calendar: 200; CC
- Korean calendar: 2533
- Minguo calendar: 1712 before ROC 民前1712年
- Nanakshahi calendar: −1268
- Seleucid era: 511/512 AG
- Thai solar calendar: 742–743
- Tibetan calendar: ས་མོ་ཡོས་ལོ་ (female Earth-Hare); 326 or −55 or −827 — to — ལྕགས་ཕོ་འབྲུག་ལོ་ (male Iron-Dragon); 327 or −54 or −826

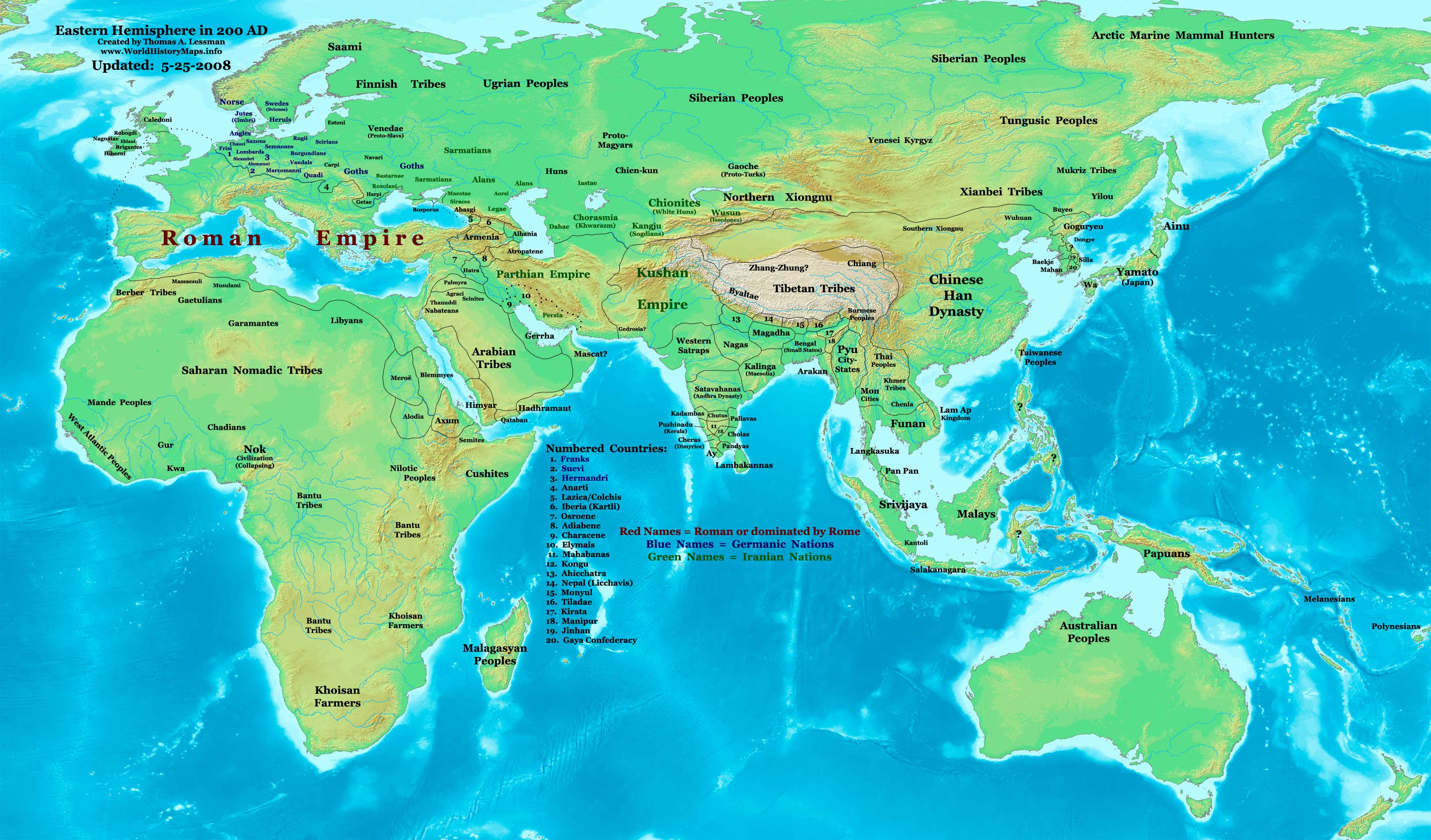
The eastern hemisphere in 200

Year 200 (CC) was a leap year starting on Tuesday of the Julian calendar. At the time, it was known as the Year of the Consulship of Severus and Victorinus (or, less frequently, year 953 Ab urbe condita). The denomination 200 for this year has been used since the early medieval period, when the Anno Domini calendar era became the prevalent method in Europe for naming years.

== Events ==
=== By place ===
==== World ====
- Human population reaches about 257 million.

==== Roman Empire ====
- Emperor Septimius Severus visits the provinces of Syria, Palestine, and Arabia.
- The province of Numidia is taken from the African proconsul, and made an Imperial province.

==== India ====
- Rudrasena I, Saka ruler of the Western Satrap dynasty, becomes king of Malwa in Classical India.

==== China ====
- September-November - Battle of Guandu: Chinese warlord Cao Cao defeats his rival Yuan Shao.
- In Jiaozhi (present-day northern Vietnam), a rebellion broke out among the locals, who killed Inspector Zhu Fu due to his corruption.

==== Japan ====
- In Japan, Himiko, whose capital is situated in Yamatai, extends her authority over a number of clans.

==== America ====
- The Classic Age of Maya civilization begins (around this year).
- The Paracas culture in the Andes ends (around this year).

=== By topic ===
==== Art ====
- The Severan Tondo, depicting Septimius Severus, Julia Domna and their children Geta and Caracalla, from Fayum, Egypt, is made. It is now kept at Staatliche Museen zu Berlin, Preußischer Kulturbesitz, Antikensammlung.

==== Religion ====
- Clement of Alexandria denounces the use of musical instruments instead of human voices in Christian music.
- Brahmanism evolves into Hinduism (approximate date).

== Births ==
- Cyprian, Roman bishop and writer (d. 258)
- Diophantus, Greek mathematician and writer
- Marcus Claudius Tacitus, Roman emperor (d. 276)
- Novatian, Roman antipope and theologian (d. 258)
- Valerian I, Roman emperor (d. 260/264)
- Zhang Changpu, Chinese concubine (d. 257)

== Deaths ==
- Gan Ji, Chinese Taoist priest and writer
- Ju Shou, Chinese adviser and politician
- Quintus Aemilius Saturninus, Roman prefect
- Sun Ce, Chinese general and warlord (b. 175)
- Tian Feng, Chinese official, adviser and politician
- Xu Gong, Chinese official, administrator and warlord
- Zheng Xuan, Chinese philosopher and writer (b. 127)
- Emperor Chūai of Japan, according to legend
- Chunyu Qiong
- Yan Liang
- Wen Chou
