= End of the Han dynasty =

Historical era of China (189–220)

- Traditional Chinese: 漢朝末年
- Simplified Chinese: 汉朝末年
Transcriptions
Standard Mandarin
- Hanyu Pinyin: Hàncháo Mònián

End of the Eastern Han dynasty
- Traditional Chinese: 東漢末年
- Simplified Chinese: 东汉末年
Transcriptions
Standard Mandarin
- Hanyu Pinyin: Dōnghàn Mònián

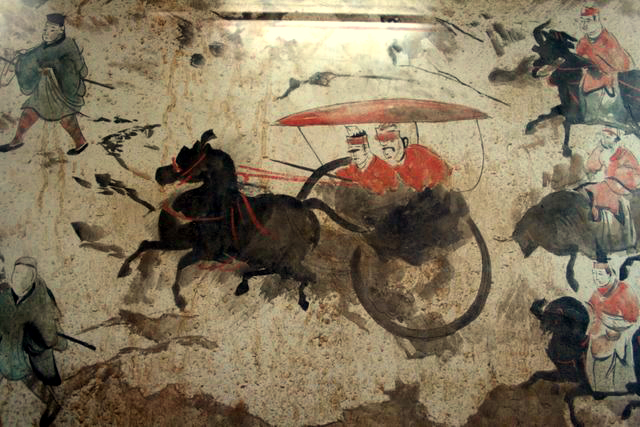
Late Han fresco of 9 chariots, 50 horses, and over 70 men, from a tomb in Luoyang

The end of the (Eastern) Han dynasty was the period of Chinese history from 189 to 220 CE, roughly coinciding with the tumultuous reign of the Han dynasty's last ruler, Emperor Xian. It was followed by the Three Kingdoms era (220–280 CE). During the end of the Han dynasty, the country was thrown into turmoil by the Yellow Turban Rebellion (184–205). Meanwhile, the Han Empire's institutions were destroyed by the warlord Dong Zhuo and fractured into regional regimes ruled by various warlords, some of whom were nobles and officials of the Han imperial court. The warlord Cao Cao took control of Emperor Xian and his court in 196 and began gradually reunifying the empire. Cao Cao ostensibly operated under Emperor Xian's rule, though in reality the emperor was a hostage.

Cao Cao's efforts to reunify China were rebuffed at the Battle of Red Cliffs in 208–209, when his armies were defeated by the allied forces of Sun Quan and Liu Bei. The Han dynasty formally ended in 220 when Cao Cao's son and heir, Cao Pi, pressured Emperor Xian into abdicating in his favour. Cao Pi became the emperor of a new dynasty, Cao Wei. In response, Liu Bei established the Shu Han dynasty in 221 with himself as its emperor. Sun Quan founded the Eastern Wu dynasty in 222, first adopting the title of king and later declared himself emperor in 229. The period from the end of the Han dynasty in 220 to the reunification of China proper under the Western Jin dynasty in May 280 is known as the Three Kingdoms era in Chinese history.

== Collapse of imperial authority (184–191) ==
=== Yellow Turban Rebellion and decentralisation (184–189) ===
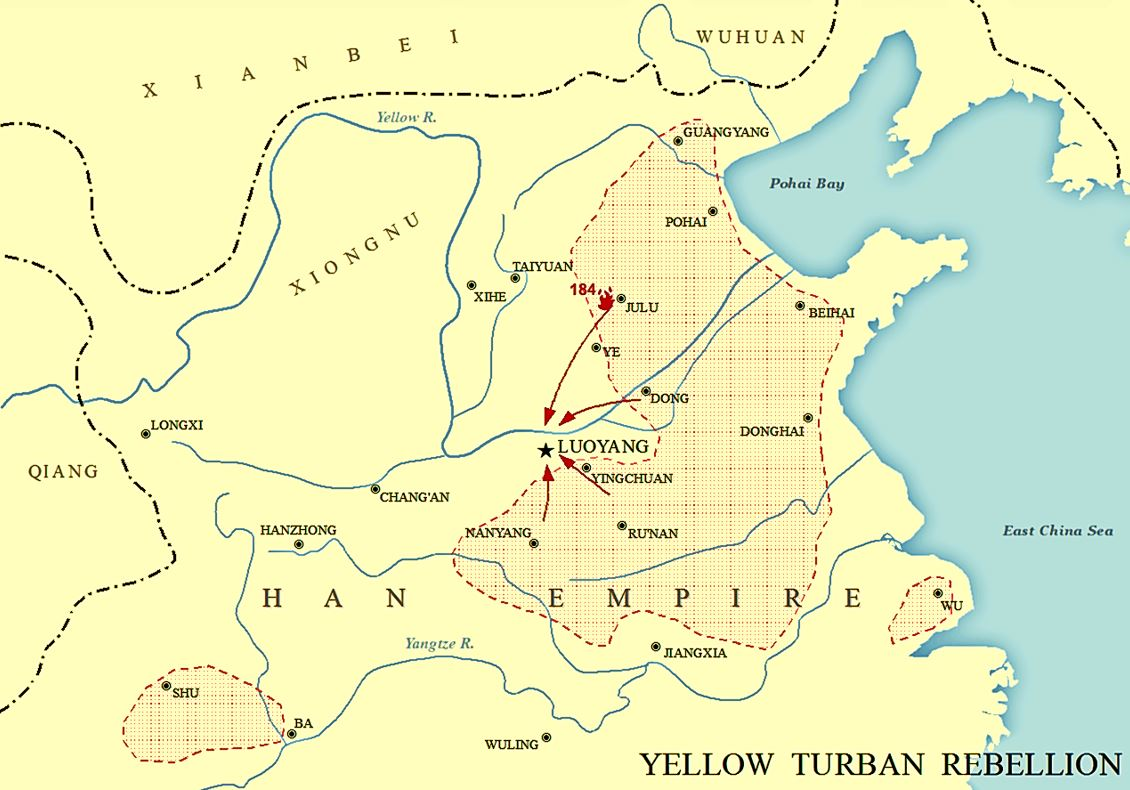
Map showing the Yellow Turban Rebellion.

Towards the end of the reign of Emperor Ling of Han (r. 168–189), many officials in the imperial court foresaw chaos in the political scene as soon as Emperor Ling died. One of those officials, Liu Yan, suggested to Emperor Ling in 188 that the root of the agrarian revolts during that time, including the most serious one, the Yellow Turban Rebellion of 184, was that Inspectors (刺史) lacked substantial administrative powers. Emperor Ling, convinced by Liu Yan, changed the Inspectors' titles to "Governor" (牧) and granted them the authority to levy taxes and command armed forces within the borders. Liu Yan was commissioned as the Governor of Yi Province (covering the Sichuan Basin), while several other important officials also became Governors, including Liu Yu, who was appointed Governor of You Province (covering present-day northern Hebei, Beijing, Tianjin and Liaoning). The increased influence of these provincial governors formed the basis on which later warlords would control large regions of the Han empire.

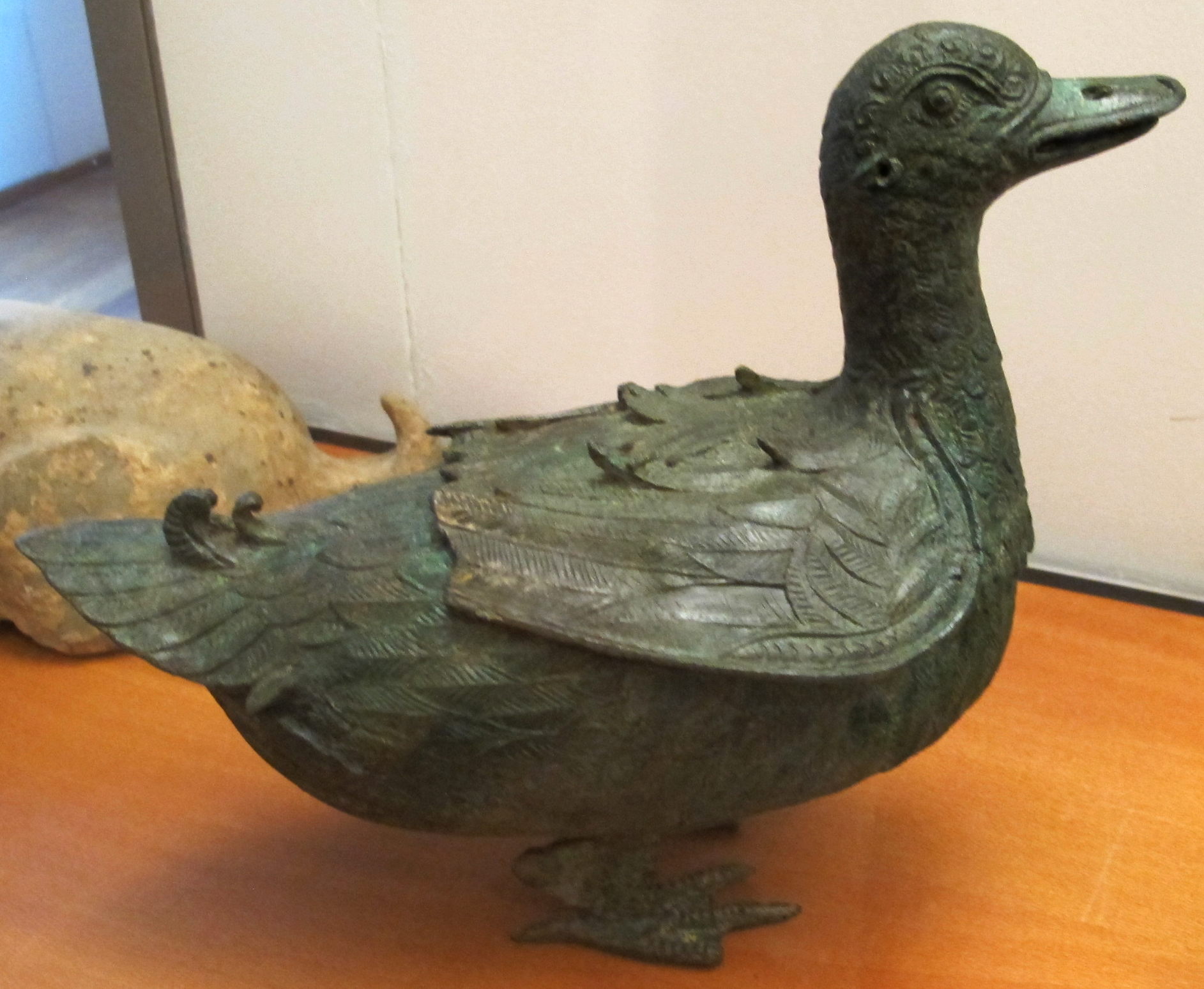
Eastern Han incense burner and bronze sculpture in the shape of a duck

=== Imperial power struggle (189) ===
Emperor Ling died in 189 and was succeeded by his 13-year-old son, Liu Bian (born to Empress He), who became known as Emperor Shao. Empress He, now empress dowager, became regent to the young emperor, while her older brother, General-in-Chief He Jin, became the most powerful official in the imperial court. He Jin and Yuan Shao plotted to exterminate all the Ten Attendants, a group of influential eunuch officials in the court, but Empress Dowager He disapproved of their plan. In a fateful move, He Jin summoned Dong Zhuo, a warlord controlling the battle-tested Liang Province (涼州; covering present-day Gansu), to march on the capital Luoyang to pressure Empress Dowager He into eliminating the Ten Attendants. After the eunuchs discovered He Jin's plot, they lured him into the palace and murdered him (22 September 189). In response, Yuan Shao led the imperial guards on an indiscriminate massacre of the palace eunuchs. The surviving eunuchs kidnapped Emperor Shao and his younger brother, the eight-year-old Prince of Chenliu (raised by his grandmother Empress Dowager Dong), and fled north towards the Yellow River, but were finally forced to commit suicide by throwing themselves into the river.

Dong Zhuo arrived on the scene and found Emperor Shao and the Prince of Chenliu. The young emperor appeared nervous and fearful, while the prince remained calm and composed, and gave orders to Dong Zhuo to escort them back to the palace. Dong Zhuo used the opportunity to seize control of state power and bring his army into the capital. Not long later, Dong Zhuo deposed and poisoned Emperor Shao and replaced him with the Prince of Chenliu, who became known as Emperor Xian. Dong Zhuo dominated the imperial court and named himself "Chancellor of State" (相國), a title not held by anyone since the Western Han dynasty statesman Xiao He; Dong Zhuo also granted himself the privilege of attending court without needing to disarm himself or remove his shoes.

=== Resistance against Dong Zhuo (189–191) ===
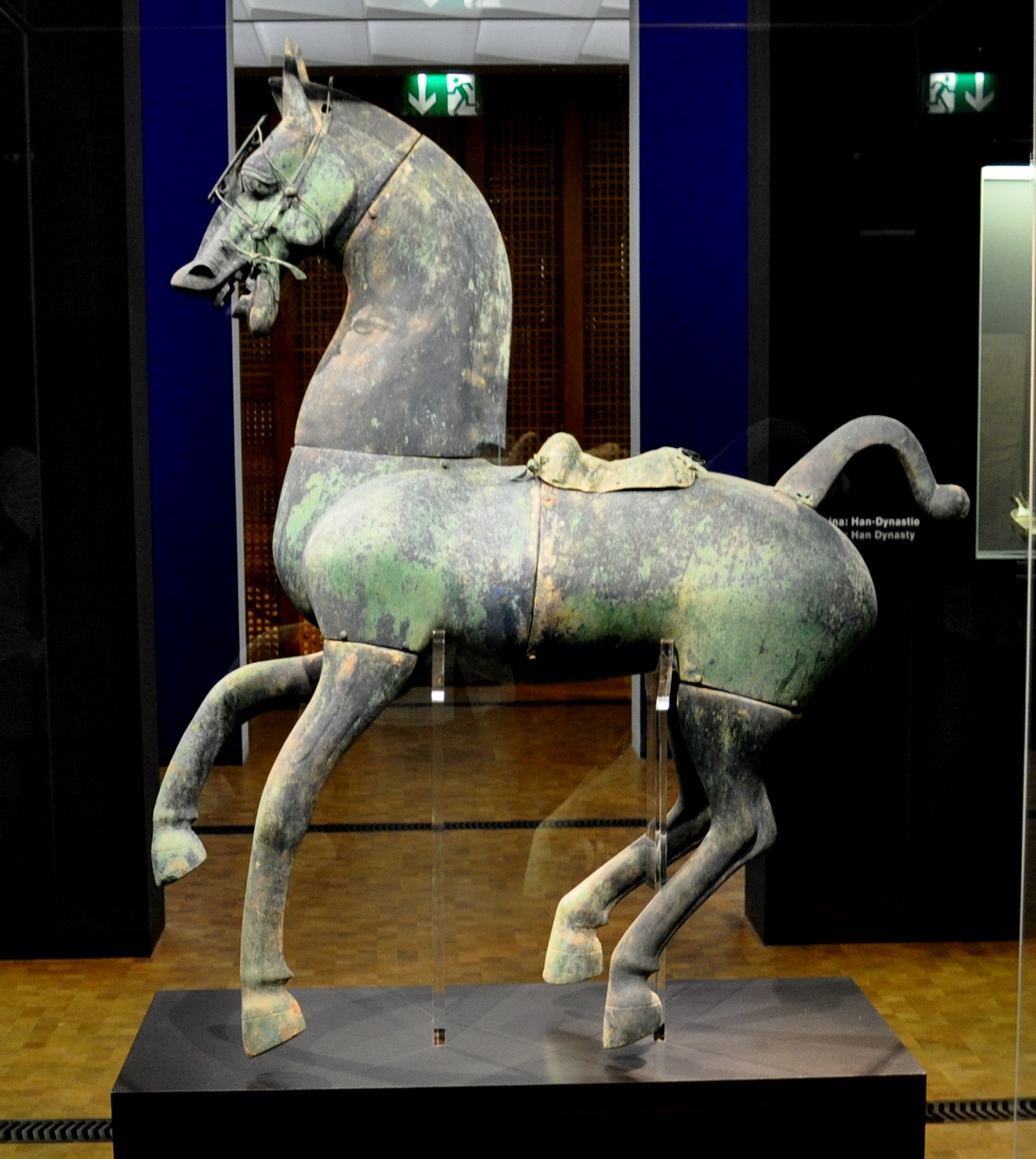
An Eastern Han prancing horse, bronze sculpture, 2nd century

In the spring of 190, several provincial officials and warlords formed a coalition against Dong Zhuo, claiming that he was set on usurping the throne and had effectively kidnapped Emperor Xian. Yuan Shao, Administrator of Bohai (around present-day Cangzhou, Hebei), was nominated to be the leader of the coalition. The coalition's armies were stationed at Henei (河內; in present-day Jiaozuo, Henan) and appeared to be ready to move on the capital Luoyang. However, the coalition was actually rather disorganized, and Yuan Shao did not have effective command over the entire alliance. Besides, the coalition members were also hesitant to directly confront Dong Zhuo and his strong Liang Province army. Still, Dong Zhuo was anxious and chose to move the capital to Chang'an in the west to avoid the coalition. About a month later, Dong Zhuo forced Emperor Xian and the imperial court to move to Chang'an, along with Luoyang's residents, and in the process, he ordered the former capital to be destroyed by fire. During the move, Dong Zhuo remained near Luoyang, ready to resist any coalition attacks on him. In 191, the coalition tried to further de-legitimize Dong Zhuo's position by offering to enthrone Liu Yu, who was eligible to be Emperor since he was a member of the royal clan. Liu Yu remained faithful to Emperor Xian and firmly declined to take the throne. As the coalition members continued to bicker over battle plans, a minor general under Yuan Shu, Sun Jian, took a calculated risk and attacked Dong Zhuo directly near Luoyang. After scoring several victories over Dong Zhuo's forces, Sun Jian eventually forced Dong to retreat to Chang'an, and Luoyang came under the coalition's control.

For the following months until the end of 191, the coalition ceased to take further action against Dong Zhuo and eventually disbanded, with its members returning to their respective bases. Soon, several officials started having thoughts of controlling and ruling over their own territories like kings. The most prominent warlords who emerged at that time included:

- Yuan Shao, who seized control of Ji Province (covering present-day central and southern Hebei and northern Henan) from Han Fu in 191
- Liu Yan, who controlled Yi Province
- Liu Biao, who controlled Jing Province (covering present-day Hubei and Hunan)
- Yuan Shu, Yuan Shao's half-brother (cousin in name), who controlled the area south of the Huai River (covering present-day northern and central Anhui)

However, in addition to these greater warlords, in time the entire Han empire virtually fractured into small blocs, each controlled by a local warlord.

== Dong Zhuo's death and continued warfare (192–196) ==
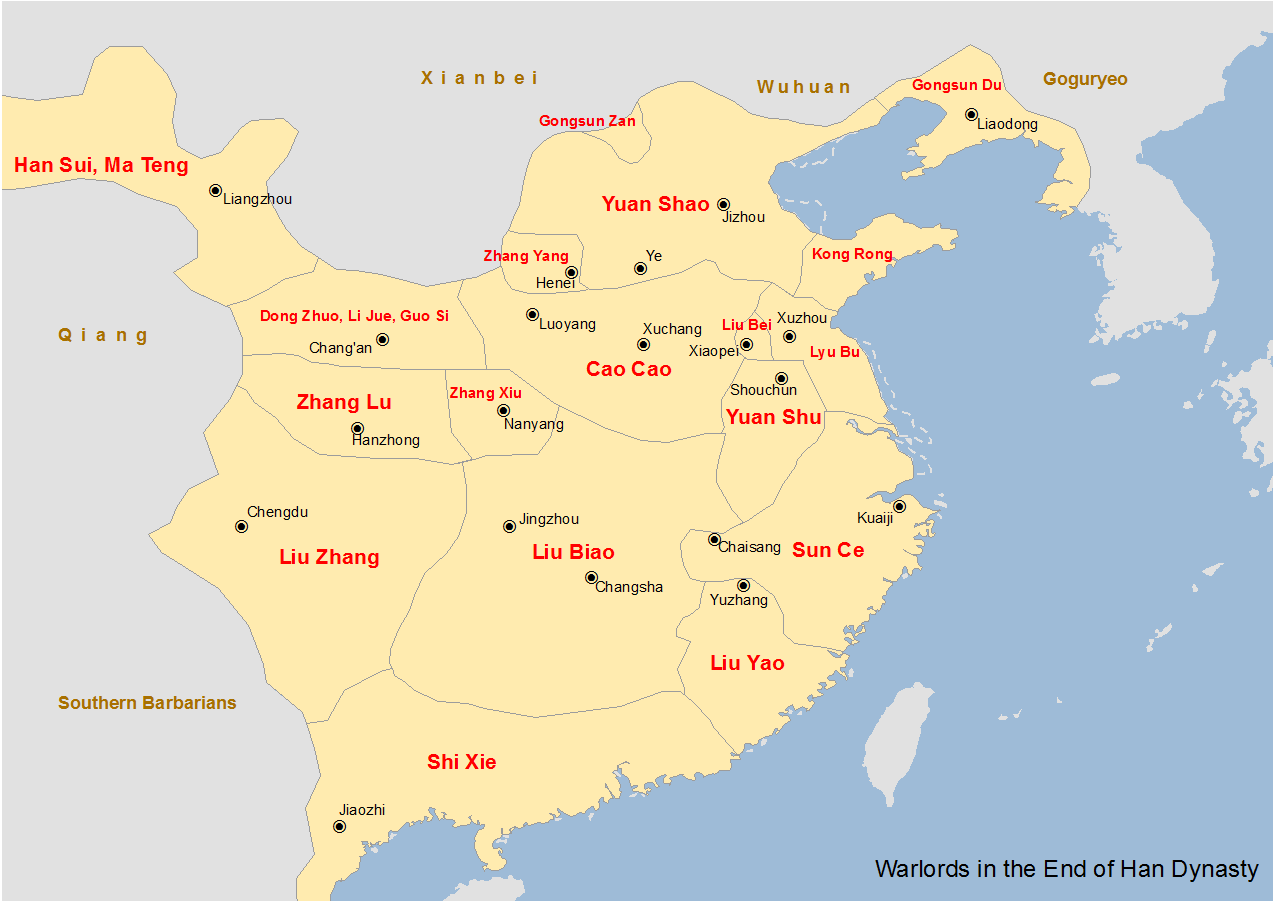
Map showing major Chinese warlords in the 190s.

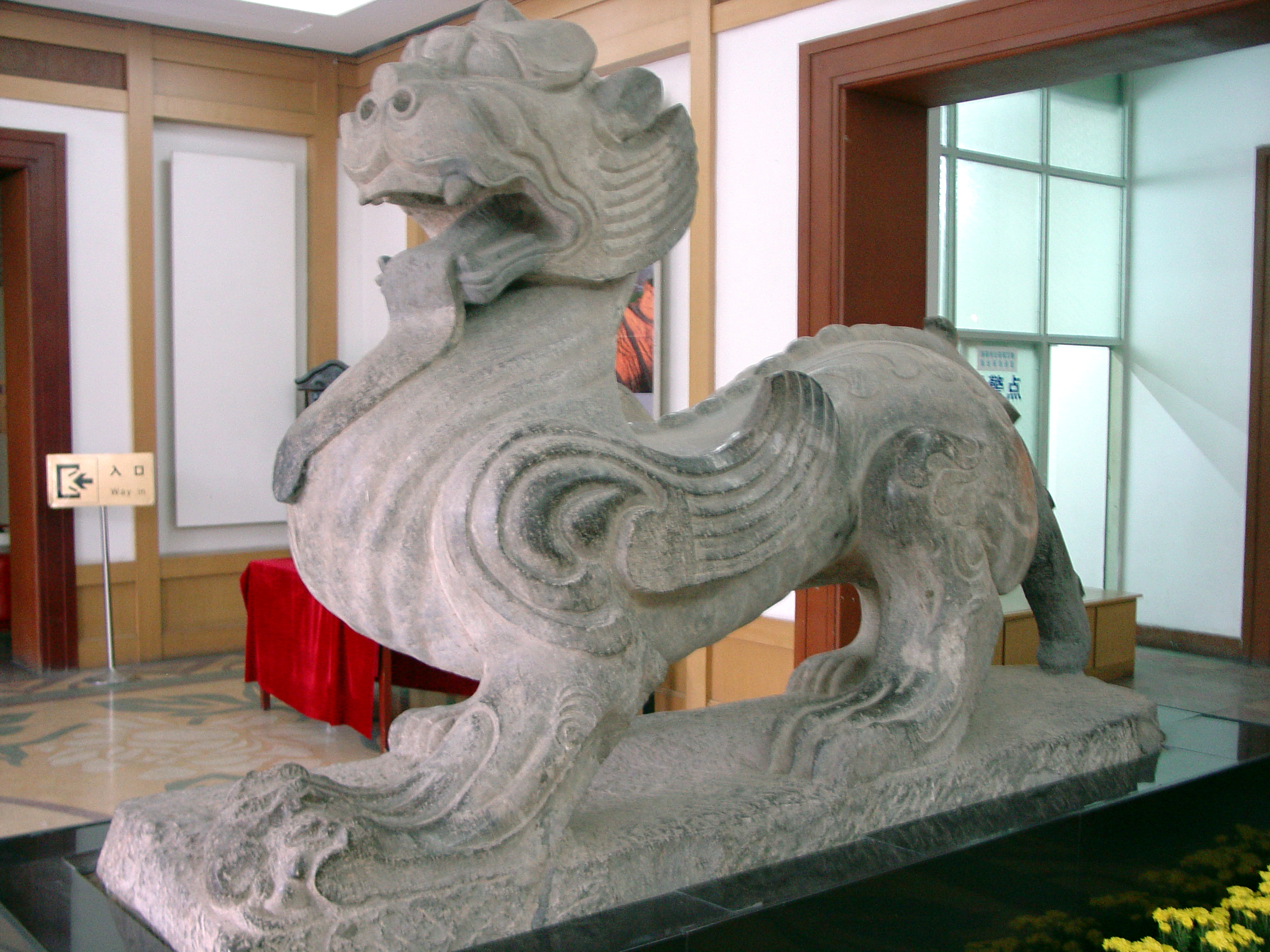
An Eastern Han stone-carved tomb guardian (Tianlu); City Museum of Luoyang

=== Dong Zhuo's death and aftermath (192) ===
After Dong Zhuo withdrew to Chang'an, he maintained an even tighter grip on the government and cruelly dealt with all dissent against him. Interior Minister Wang Yun and a few other officials, including Huang Wan (黃琬), Shisun Rui (士孫瑞), and Yang Zan (楊瓚), plotted to eliminate Dong Zhuo. They eventually persuaded Dong Zhuo's foster son, Lü Bu, to join them. Lü Bu bore a grudge against Dong Zhuo because the latter almost killed him once during a fit of anger, and also because he was afraid that his secret affair with one of Dong Zhuo's maids might be exposed. In May 192, the conspirators, led by Lü Bu and Wang Yun, assassinated Dong Zhuo and slaughtered his clan.

After Dong Zhuo's death, it was believed that the chaos caused by Dong Zhuo's "reign of terror" would subside, and the central government would be restored to its original state. However, although Wang Yun was regarded as a capable minister, he gradually became arrogant and made several key mistakes that would cause his downfall. He failed to maintain good relations with Lü Bu, and strongly refused to grant amnesty to the surviving followers of Dong Zhuo and ordered them to be disbanded. This caused Dong Zhuo's men to fear that they might be massacred. Dong Zhuo's son-in-law, Niu Fu, took control of Dong's forces in Henan and resisted Wang Yun, but was later killed by one of his own subordinates. Niu Fu's subordinates, Li Jue, Guo Si and Fan Chou, wanted to submit to the imperial court, but as they had previously resisted Wang Yun, Wang now rejected their request for amnesty. Li Jue, Guo Si and Fan Chou led their armies to attack Chang'an and took control of the government. Wang Yun was captured and executed along with his family, while Lü Bu was defeated and driven away.

=== Continued warfare (193–196) ===
After taking control over the imperial court in Chang'an, Li Jue, Guo Si and Fan Chou did as they pleased without showing any regard for the welfare of the state. Concurrently, provincial warlords all over China battled each other to expand their territories or further their personal interests. Some of those warlords were friendly with Li Jue's forces, while others remained hostile to them, even though all of them nominally acknowledged Emperor Xian as the sovereign ruler of China.

In 193, armed conflict broke out between the northern warlords Liu Yu and Gongsun Zan. Liu Yu strongly opposed warfare while Gongsun Zan continuously waged war against Yuan Shao. Liu Yu and Gongsun Zan made accusations against each other in their respective memorials to Emperor Xian. Eventually, Liu Yu was unable to tolerate Gongsun Zan and attacked the latter, but was defeated and killed.

In 195, turmoil ensued in Chang'an when Li Jue and Guo Si killed Fan Chou together, and later turned against each other. Li Jue held Emperor Xian hostage while Guo Si kidnapped the imperial officials, and both sides engaged in battle. Later that year, Li Jue and Guo Si made peace and agreed to allow Emperor Xian to return to the old capital, Luoyang, but later regretted their decision and pursued him. While Li Jue and Guo Si were never able to capture Emperor Xian again, the imperial court was rendered poor and unable to fend for itself. As Luoyang had been previously devastated by fire during Dong Zhuo's time, the city lacked the essentials of life and many officials starved to death or resorted to cannibalism. Around this time, Yuan Shao's advisor Ju Shou suggested that he welcome Emperor Xian to his province so that he could take effective control of the government. However, Yuan's other advisors Guo Tu and Chunyu Qiong opposed Ju Shou's view, claiming that if Yuan brought Emperor Xian to his territory, he would need to yield to the emperor on key decisions and follow proper court protocol. Yuan Shao remained hesitant and did not conclude whether to receive the emperor or not.

== Gradual reunification under Cao Cao (196–207) ==
=== Cao Cao's use of Emperor Xian as titular authority ===
While Yuan Shao was still indecisive on whether to welcome Emperor Xian or not, Cao Cao took advantage of the situation to bring the emperor to his territory. At that time, Cao Cao was still a relatively minor warlord, with only Yan Province (兗州; covering present-day western Shandong and eastern Henan) under his control. In 196, Cao Cao led his army towards Luoyang. He encountered Dong Cheng and Yang Feng (who were shielding Emperor Xian from Li Jue and Guo Si), convinced them of his loyalty, and was allowed to meet the emperor. In name, Cao Cao was sharing power with the other officials and nobles, but actually, he was in control, but yet he ensured that the officials and nobles were treated with due respect, hence he faced minimal opposition in the imperial court. Later, Cao Cao escorted the emperor back to his base in Xu (許; present-day Xuchang, Henan), establishing the new capital there.

From then on, although Cao Cao was a subject of Emperor Xian in name, he actually wielded state power and controlled the imperial court. Despite so, Cao Cao never showed disrespect to Emperor Xian, and instead, honoured the emperor according to formal imperial protocol. Cao Cao also issued imperial edicts in Emperor Xian's name to other warlords, ordering them to submit to imperial authority when in fact they were actually submitting to him. Yuan Shao was among those who had received Cao Cao's edicts; only then did Yuan realize that he had lost an opportunity to make use of the emperor to control other warlords.

=== Cao Cao's rise to power (196–199) ===
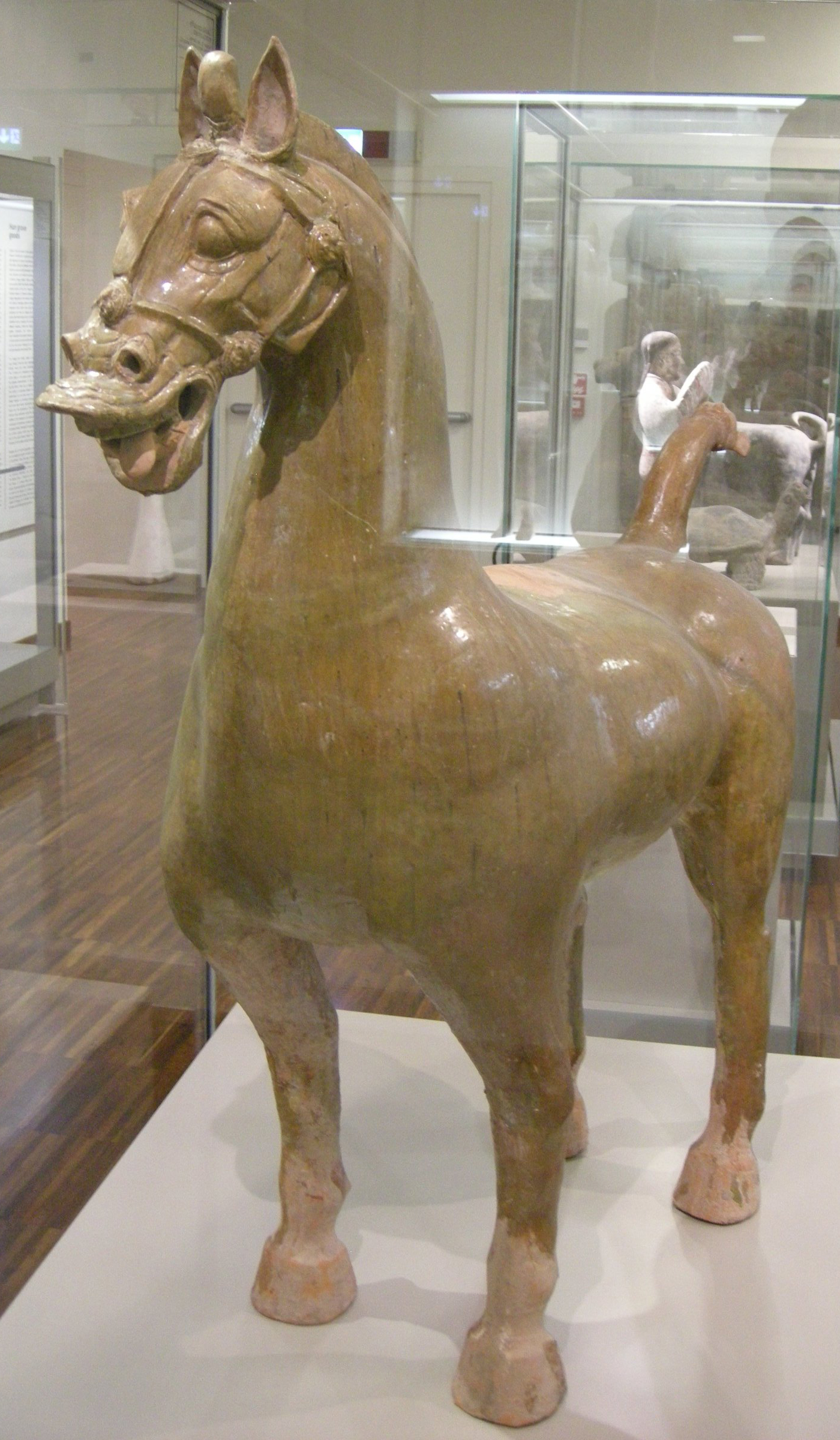
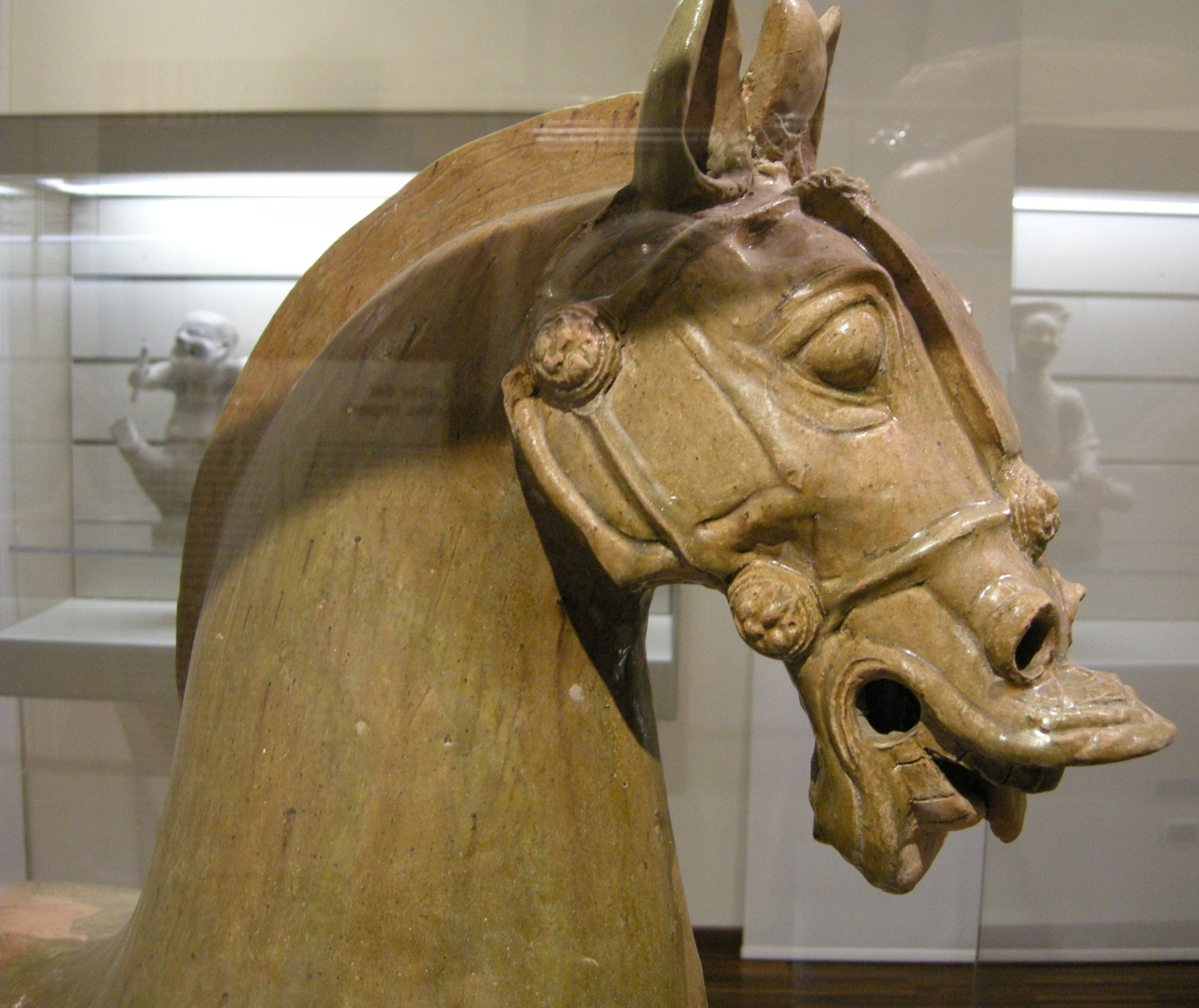
An Eastern Han glazed ceramic statue of a horse with bridle and halter headgear, from Sichuan, late 2nd century to early 3rd century AD

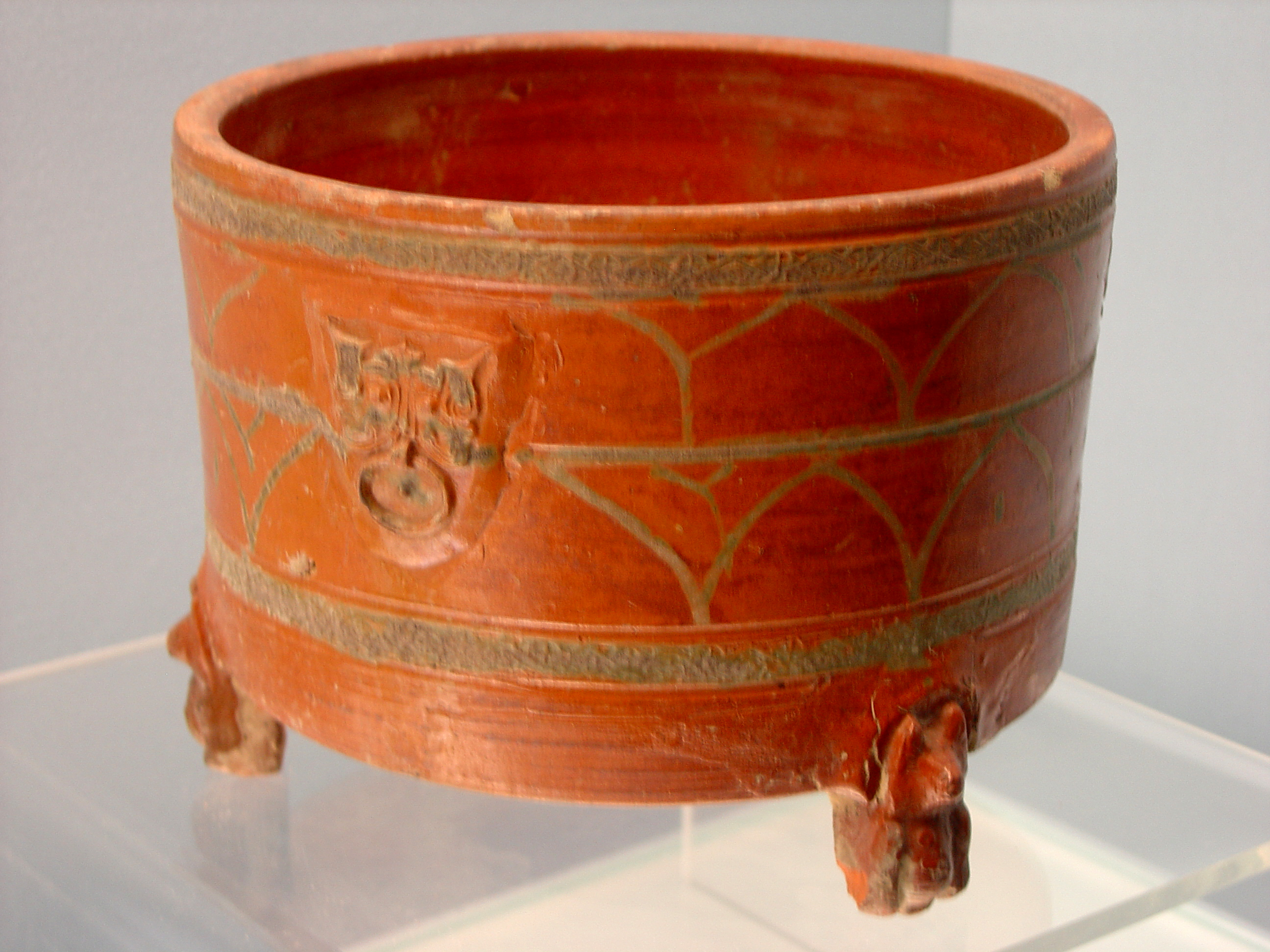
An Eastern Han glazed ceramic cosmetics box with zoomorphic feet

Even after moving to the new capital at Xu, the central government still lacked funds and food supplies. As suggested by Zao Zhi (棗祇), Cao Cao implemented a new tuntian policy to promote agricultural production, in which soldiers were sent to grow crops, and the harvest would be shared between the military and civilian population. The policy yielded commendable results as the area around Xu developed into highly productive farmland and the problem of shortage of food was resolved.

At this time, the most prominent warlords in China were:

- Yuan Shao, who controlled Ji, Bing and Qing provinces (covering most of present-day Hebei, Shanxi and Shandong). Some of the territories were governed by Yuan Shao's three sons (Yuan Tan, Yuan Xi and Yuan Shang) and nephew (Gao Gan).
- Yuan Shu, who controlled most of present-day Anhui and parts of Jiangsu
- Gongsun Zan, who controlled You Province, including present-day Beijing, Tianjin and western Liaoning
- Liu Biao, who controlled Jing Province (covering present-day Hubei and Hunan)
- Liu Zhang, who controlled Yi Province (covering the Sichuan Basin)
- Lü Bu, who seized control of Xu Province (covering present-day northern Jiangsu) from its previous governor Liu Bei

There were still many other minor warlords, and Cao Cao particularly sought to get them to submit to him. In 197, Zhang Xiu surrendered Wancheng to Cao Cao. However, Cao Cao later had an affair with Zhang Xiu's widowed aunt, angering Zhang. Zhang, who learned of Cao Cao's planned assassination on his life, rebelled and launched a surprise attack on Cao Cao at Wancheng. In this battle, Cao Cao's eldest son Cao Ang, nephew Cao Anmin, and bodyguard Dian Wei were killed, and Cao Cao himself narrowly escaped from death. On the advice of Jia Xu, Zhang Xiu eventually surrendered to Cao Cao in the winter of 199–200. In addition, in 197, Cao Cao was able to persuade Ma Teng and Han Sui, who controlled Yong and Liang provinces (covering most of present-day Shaanxi and Gansu), to submit to him.

That year, Yuan Shu declared himself "Son of Heaven" in Shouchun (壽春; present-day Shou County, Anhui), an act perceived as treason against the Han dynasty government, prompting other warlords to use that as an excuse to attack him (see Campaign against Yuan Shu). Sun Ce, son of Sun Jian, who had conquered several territories in Jiangdong between 194 and 199, ended his alliance with Yuan Shu and became an independent warlord. Lü Bu, who was also previously Yuan Shu's ally, broke ties with Yuan and dealt him a major defeat near Shouchun. Cao Cao also attacked Yuan Shu and defeated him. Yuan Shu attempted to flee north to join Yuan Shao but his way was blocked and he would die of illness on his return to Shouchun in 199.

In 198, Yuan Shao tried to persuade Cao Cao to move the capital to Juancheng (鄄城; in present-day Heze, Shandong), which was nearer to his own territory, in an attempt to wrestle Emperor Xian away from Cao, but Cao refused. Later that year, Cao Cao joined forces with Liu Bei to attack Lü Bu, defeating him at the Battle of Xiapi. Lü Bu was captured and executed on Cao Cao's order, and Xu Province came under Cao's control.

In 199, Gongsun Zan was defeated by Yuan Shao at the Battle of Yijing and he committed suicide by setting himself on fire. Gongsun Zan's territories, which extended to the northern boundaries of the Han dynasty's empire, were completely annexed by Yuan Shao. Yuan Shao then turned his attention south towards Cao Cao, who was an emerging power in central China. Yuan allied with Liu Biao and was intent on attacking Cao Cao.

=== Guandu campaign (200–201) ===
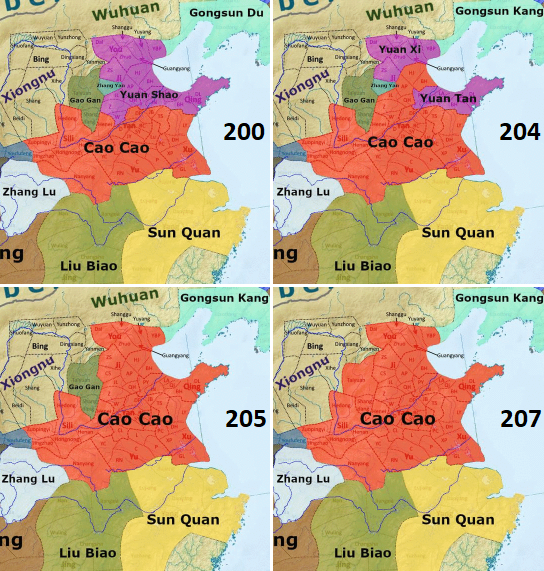
Cao Cao's conquests from the Yuan clan 200–207

Against the advice of Ju Shou and Tian Feng, who reasoned that their troops were exhausted after the battles against Gongsun Zan and needed rest, Yuan Shao prepared for a campaign against Cao Cao, confident that his much larger army could easily crush Cao Cao's. While Cao Cao readied himself for battle, he discovered that Dong Cheng, Liu Bei and a few other officials were conspiring against him. In early 200, Liu Bei used an opportunity to break away from Cao Cao and seize control of Xu Province, after killing Cao Cao's appointed governor of the province, Che Zhou (車冑). On the other hand, Dong Cheng and the others were making plans to assassinate Cao Cao. However, the plot was exposed and all the conspirators in the capital were massacred along with their families. Cao Cao then took a risk by attacking Liu Bei in Xu Province, leaving his flank open to attacks from Yuan Shao. However, Cao Cao made the right choice because Yuan Shao did not heed Tian Feng's urging to seize the chance to attack him. Liu Bei was defeated and he fled north to join Yuan Shao. Liu Bei's general Guan Yu surrendered to Cao Cao and temporarily served under Cao.

Only after Liu Bei's defeat did Yuan Shao start implementing his plan to attack Cao Cao, but this time Tian Feng opposed his decision, saying that their opportunity had passed. Yuan Shao became annoyed with Tian Feng and had Tian imprisoned, after which he led his army south to attack Cao Cao. At the Battle of Boma, Yuan Shao's general Yan Liang was slain by Guan Yu while another of Yuan's generals, Wen Chou, was killed in action against Cao Cao's forces. The morale of Yuan Shao's army was greatly affected by the loss of the two generals.

By late 200, the armies of Yuan Shao and Cao Cao finally clashed at Guandu (官渡; in present-day Zhengzhou, Henan), south of the Yellow River. Yuan Shao had two advantages over Cao Cao - numerical superiority and a greater amount of supplies, but Cao Cao's troops were better trained than his. After some minor skirmishes, both sides became locked in a stalemate, until Cao Cao personally led a small detachment on a surprise attack on Yuan Shao's supply depot at Wuchao, which was defended by Chunyu Qiong. Instead of sending reinforcements to Wuchao, Yuan Shao sent Zhang He and Gao Lan (高覽) to attack Cao Cao's camp but was unsuccessful. The fall of Wuchao dealt a major blow to the morale of Yuan Shao's army, which was subsequently routed by Cao Cao's forces. Yuan Shao fled north of the Yellow River while most of his troops were either killed or surrendered to Cao Cao. From that point on, although Yuan Shao continued to remain as a major power player, he could no longer challenge Cao Cao's growing supremacy. The latter destroyed and defeated the remaining Yuan troops south of the Yellow River in the Battle of Cangting (201), concluding the Guandu campaign.

=== Fall of the Yuan power bloc (202–207) ===
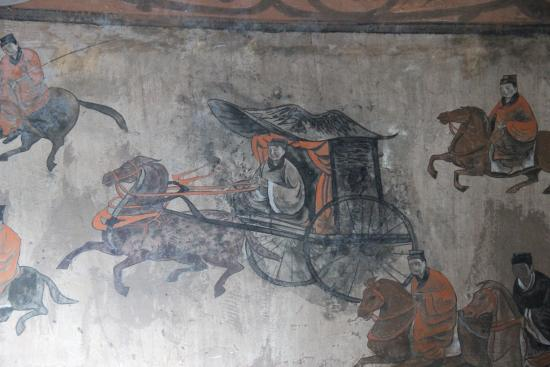
Late Eastern Han mural showing chariots and cavalry, from the Dahuting tombs

After Yuan Shao died of illness in 202, a succession struggle developed between his oldest son Yuan Tan and third son Yuan Shang. Several years before Yuan Shao's death, based on the traditional order of succession, Yuan Tan should have been designated as the heir apparent, but as Yuan Shao's wife Lady Liu favoured Yuan Shang, Yuan Shao had Yuan Tan posthumously adopted by the latter's uncle, Yuan Cheng (袁成). Yuan Shao then divided his territories between his sons and nephew Gao Gan, ostensibly so that he could determine their abilities. His base of Ji Province was given to Yuan Shang, Yuan Tan controlled Qing Province, Yuan Xi governed You Province, and Gao Gan ruled Bing Province. On his deathbed, Yuan Shao did not leave any explicit instruction as to who should succeed him. Of Yuan Shao's followers, Pang Ji and Shen Pei supported Yuan Shang, while Xin Ping and Guo Tu favoured Yuan Tan. After Yuan Shao's death, most of his subordinates initially wanted Yuan Tan to be their new lord since he was the oldest son. However, Shen Pei and Peng Ji forged a will, naming Yuan Shang as the successor. Yuan Tan was furious and mobilized his forces under the pretext of attacking Cao Cao, drawing Cao's attention, and Cao preemptively retaliated. Yuan Shang came to his oldest brother's aid, and they fought inconclusively against Cao Cao in the Battle of Liyang.

In 203, Cao Cao scored a major victory over the Yuans, who retreated to Ji Province's capital, Ye. Cao Cao then planned to besiege Ye, but later withdrew his forces after heeding Guo Jia's advice. Guo Jia reasoned that if Cao Cao pressured the Yuans, they might unite against a common enemy; however, if Cao Cao retreated, the disgruntled Yuan brothers would start fighting among themselves. Guo Jia's prediction came true later when Yuan Tan, still bearing a grudge against Yuan Shang for receiving a larger inheritance, attacked Yuan Shang, but his forces in Qing Province defected to Yuan Shang. Yuan Tan fled to Pingyuan (in present-day Dezhou, Shandong) and was besieged by Yuan Shang there. Yuan Tan sought help from Cao Cao, and Cao advanced north to attack Ye, forcing Yuan Shang to lift the siege on Pingyuan. In early 204, Yuan Shang incorrectly believed that Cao Cao had withdrawn, so he attacked his brother again at Pingyuan. Cao Cao attacked Ye once more and Yuan Shang headed back to defend his base but was defeated by Cao Cao. Yuan Shang then fled north to Zhongshan (in present-day Shijiazhuang, Hebei), and Ye fell to Cao Cao. Gao Gan also surrendered Bing Province to Cao Cao.

During Cao Cao's siege on Ye, Yuan Tan did not help attack Ye but sought to take Yuan Shang's territories, defeating Yuan Shang in Zhongshan. Yuan Shang fled further north to join Yuan Xi in You Province. Cao Cao now accused Yuan Tan of breaching the trust in the alliance so he turned east to attack him, capturing Yuan Tan's last stronghold at Nanpi (南皮; in present-day Cangzhou, Hebei) and killing Yuan. Meanwhile, in You Province, Yuan Xi's subordinate Jiao Chu (焦觸) revolted and surrendered to Cao Cao, forcing Yuan Xi and Yuan Shang to flee further north to join the Wuhuan tribes under chief Tadun. Around this time, Gao Gan also rebelled against Cao Cao but was defeated by 206 and killed while attempting to flee south to join Liu Biao.

In 207, Cao Cao's army headed north to attack the Wuhuan, defeating them at the Battle of White Wolf Mountain. Tadun was killed in battle while Yuan Xi and Yuan Shang sought refuge under Gongsun Kang, a warlord who controlled most of present-day Liaoning. Gongsun Kang feared that the Yuans might turn against him and seize his territory, so he had them executed and sent their heads to Cao Cao. By this time, the Yuan clan had been eliminated and much of northern China had been reunified under Cao Cao's control.

=== Developments in southern China (194–208) ===
During his reunification of northern China, Cao Cao did not conduct any major campaigns south while awaiting an opportunity to act against the remaining three most prominent warlords: Sun Quan, who had succeeded his older brother Sun Ce after the latter died in 200; Liu Biao, governor of Jing Province; and Liu Zhang, governor of Yi Province. During that time, Sun Quan was developing his territories in Jiangdong, and strengthening his military forces. In 208, Sun Quan defeated and killed Liu Biao's vassal Huang Zu at the Battle of Jiangxia, seizing most of Huang's territory at Jiangxia (江夏; present-day Xinzhou District, Wuhan, Hubei).

While Cao Cao was attacking the Yuan clan in northern China, Liu Bei fled south to join Liu Biao and became a vassal under the latter, who stationed him at the northern border in Xinye County to keep Cao Cao at bay. An initial Cao attack on Liu Bei was repelled during the Battle of Bowang (202).

== Red Cliffs campaign (208–209) ==
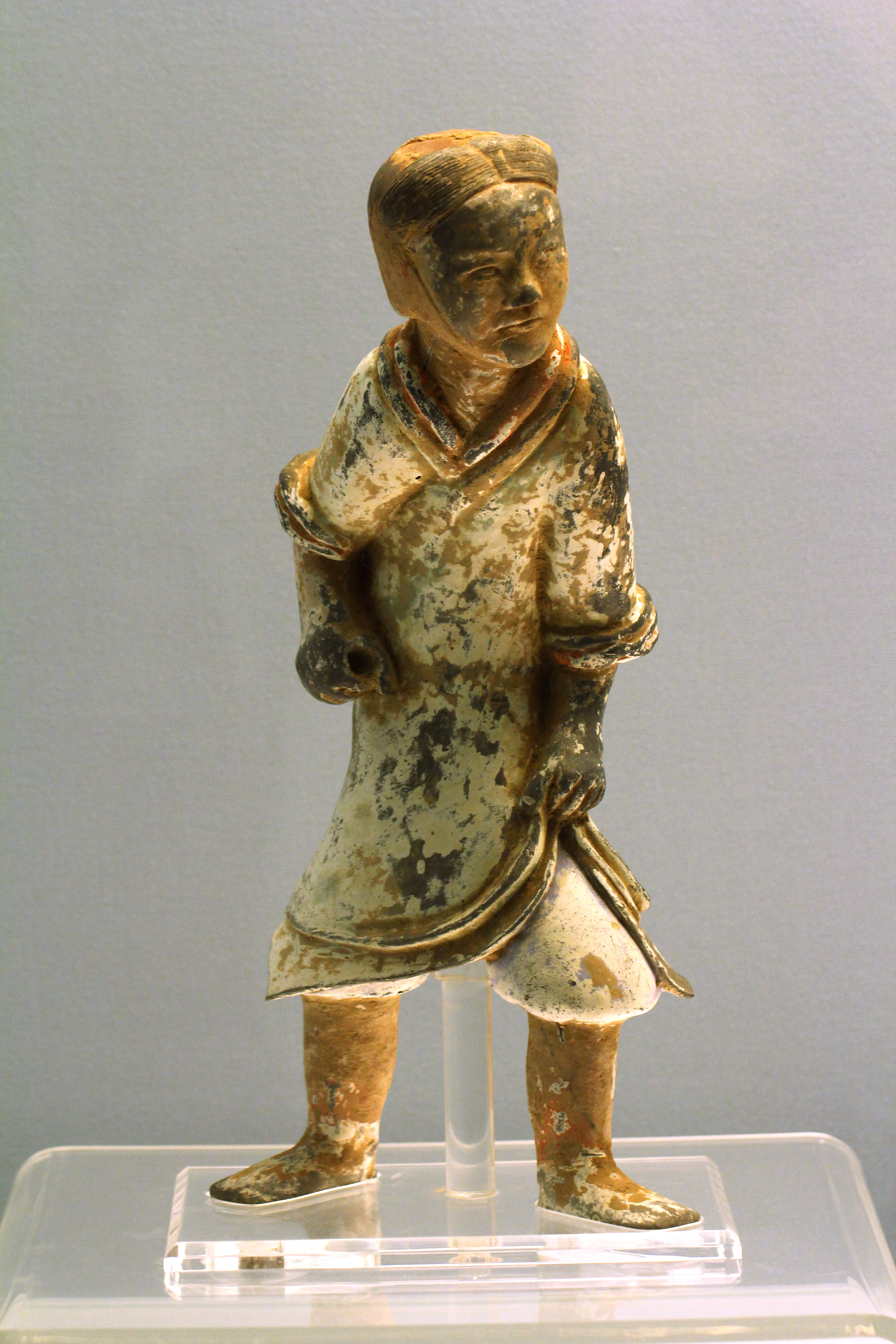
Eastern Han ceramic figurine of a soldier with a missing spear

=== Cao Cao's invasion of Jing Province (208) ===
In 208, Cao Cao launched a southern campaign to conquer Liu Biao's Jing Province. Liu Biao was ill and dying when a succession struggle broke out between his sons Liu Qi and Liu Cong. After Huang Zu's defeat, Liu Qi was appointed by Liu Biao as Administrator of Jiangxia, which was previously governed by Huang. Liu Cong, who was favoured by Liu Biao's second wife Lady Cai (because he married her niece), remained in Jing Province's capital, Xiangyang. Liu Cong became the new Governor of Jing Province after his father's death. Fearing that he might be caught in a war on two fronts (Cao Cao in the north and Liu Qi in the southeast), Liu Cong surrendered to Cao Cao, and most of Jing Province came under Cao Cao's control. Liu Bei was unwilling to submit to Cao Cao and fled south. Along the way, one of Cao Cao's light cavalry units caught up with Liu Bei's retreating forces (which included civilians) and defeated them at the Battle of Changban. Liu Bei escaped with his life and fled to Dangyang (當陽; in present-day Yichang, Hubei).

In Jiangdong, Sun Quan felt threatened by Cao Cao's approaching army and sent Lu Su to discuss forming an alliance with Liu Bei and Liu Qi against Cao Cao. Cao Cao wrote Sun Quan a letter, intended to intimidate the latter into submitting. Cao Cao's army was estimated to be 220,000 men strong, although Cao himself claimed that he had 800,000 troops. Sun Quan had 30,000 men, while Liu Bei and Liu Qi's combined forces totalled about 10,000. Many of Sun Quan's followers, including Zhang Zhao, strongly advocated surrender because of Cao Cao's overwhelming forces. However, Sun Quan refused as he agreed with Zhou Yu and Lu Su's view that Cao Cao might not let him off even if he submitted. By late 208, with help from Zhou Yu, Lu Su, and Zhuge Liang (who represented Liu Bei in the diplomatic exchange), an alliance was formed between Sun Quan and Liu Bei against Cao Cao.

=== Battle of Red Cliffs (208) ===
Sun Quan put Zhou Yu in command of his 30,000 troops, largely stationed on naval vessels. Zhou Yu set up a defensive position in conjunction with Liu Bei, whose army garrisoned on land. Around this time, a spreading plague significantly weakened Cao Cao's forces. Zhou Yu's subordinate Huang Gai pretended to defect to Cao Cao's side and was accepted by the latter. Huang Gai brought a small group of men with him and sailed towards Cao Cao's base on boats. As the boats approached Cao Cao's fleet, Huang Gai ordered his men to set the boats on fire, and the burning boats crashed into Cao Cao's larger ships. The fire spread out of control and destroyed Cao Cao's entire naval fleet. Cao Cao's land forces at Wulin (烏林; in present-day Honghu, Hubei) were also attacked and driven back by Sun Quan and Liu Bei's armies. Cao Cao suffered a drastic defeat at the Battle of Red Cliffs and was forced to retreat north back to Jiangling (江陵, located in present-day Jingjiang 荆江, not to be confused with present-day Jiangling County, Hubei).

== Emergence of the Three Kingdoms (209–220) ==
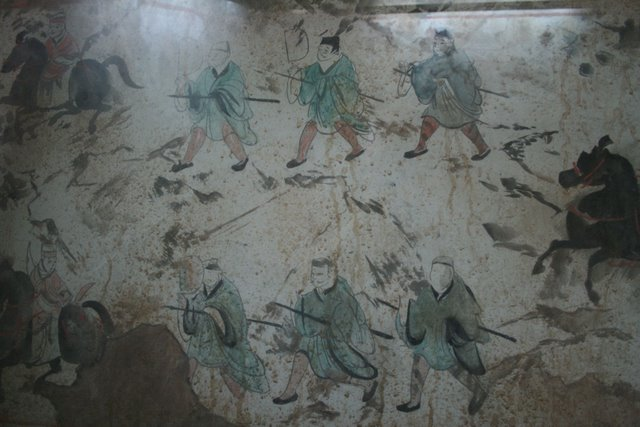
Late Han Luoyang tomb fresco showing chariots, horses and men

=== Sun–Liu conquest of Jing Province (209–210) ===
Immediately after the Battle of Red Cliffs, Sun Quan's forces under Zhou Yu's command pressed on another attack on Cao Cao, leading to the Battle of Jiangling. On the other hand, Liu Bei used the opportunity to attack the four commanderies of Wuling, Changsha, Lingling and Guiyang in southern Jing Province and bring them under his control. By early 209, Cao Cao had lost most of Jing Province to the allies.

As Liu Bei had become relatively more powerful after his conquests of the four commanderies, Sun Quan became apprehensive of him and decided to strengthen their alliance by arranging for a marriage between his younger sister, Lady Sun, and Liu Bei. Zhou Yu was suspicious of Liu Bei's intentions and suggested to Sun Quan to capture Liu Bei, put him under house arrest, and then take control over Liu's forces. However, Sun Quan rejected Zhou Yu's idea as he believed that Liu Bei's forces would rebel against him even if the plan succeeded. Sun Quan did agree with Zhou Yu's suggestion to consider attacking the warlords Liu Zhang and Zhang Lu, who controlled parts of western China, including present-day southern Shaanxi and the Sichuan Basin. The plan was not set into motion and eventually aborted when Zhou Yu died in 210. Even though Sun Quan did not expand his borders west, he managed to persuade several local leaders in present-day Guangdong, Guangxi and northern Vietnam to submit to him, and these territories became part of his domain. Sun Quan then agreed to "lend" northern Jing Province to Liu Bei as well when the latter complained that the south lacked resources to sustain its military.

=== Cao Cao's northwestern campaign (211) ===
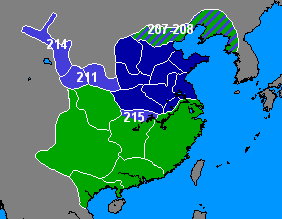
Cao Cao's territory in 206 Cao Cao's conquests 207–215 Other warlords

Cao Cao, after resting his forces for several years in light of his defeat at the Battle of Red Cliffs, made a major advance again in 211, this time to ostensibly attack Zhang Lu of Hanzhong. Warlords Han Sui and Ma Chao, who controlled Liang and Yong provinces, suspected that Cao Cao had designs on them and launched attacks in retaliation. A coalition of forces from west of Hangu Pass, led by Ma Chao and Han Sui, was defeated by Cao Cao at the Battle of Tong Pass in 211, and their territories were annexed by Cao over the next few years.

=== Liu Bei's takeover of Yi Province (212–214) ===
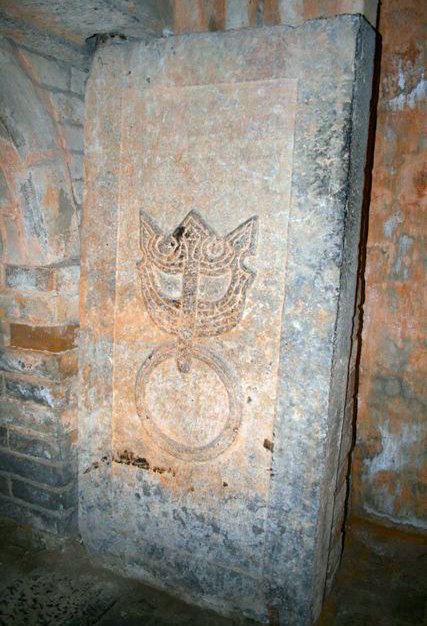
Late Han stone-carved Luoyang tomb door, representing a door knocker with a taotie face motif, common in ancient Chinese art.

Liu Zhang of Yi Province became worried of possible attacks from Zhang Lu and Cao Cao, so he sent Fa Zheng to invite Liu Bei into his domain to help him defend against Zhang Lu and Cao Cao. Fa Zheng was unimpressed with Liu Zhang's governorship and wanted Liu Bei to replace his lord, so he urged Liu Bei to use the opportunity to take control of Yi Province. Liu Bei heeded Fa Zheng's suggestion and led his army into Yi Province, where he received a warm welcome from Liu Zhang. Liu Zhang sent Liu Bei to the station at Jiameng Pass in northern Yi Province to resist Zhang Lu.

In 212, Liu Bei and Liu Zhang turned hostile towards each other and waged war. Zhuge Liang led a detachment of Liu Bei's forces left in Jing Province to join his lord in attacking Liu Zhang. Guan Yu remained behind to defend Jing Province. In 215, Liu Bei had defeated much of Liu Zhang's forces and besieged him in his capital of Chengdu. Liu Zhang surrendered and yielded Yi Province to Liu Bei. The province became Liu Bei's new base, and he used the mountainous surroundings as natural defences against Cao Cao in the north.

In the same year Liu Bei took over Yi Province, diplomatic relations between him and Sun Quan deteriorated when he refused to return Jing Province, which he "borrowed" from Sun Quan five years ago. Sun Quan launched an initial attack on Guan Yu and much of eastern Jing Province quickly submitted. However, after negotiations between Guan Yu and Lu Su, Liu Bei agreed to give up the three commanderies of Changsha, Jiangxia and Guiyang to Sun Quan, renewing their alliance and dividing Jing Province between them along the Xiang River.

=== Yangping and Hanzhong Campaign (215–219) ===
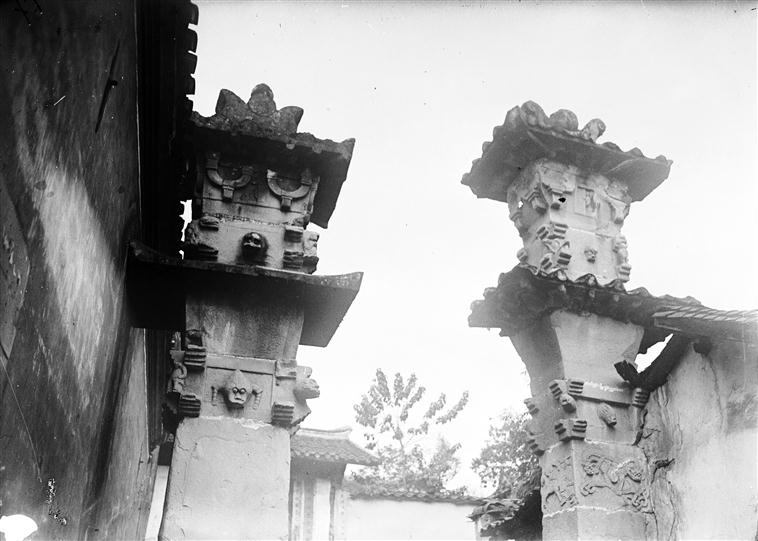
Eastern Han stone-carved que pillar gates of Dingfang, Zhong County that once belonged to a Ba Manzi temple

In 215, Cao Cao attacked Zhang Lu and defeated him at the Battle of Yangping. Zhang Lu surrendered and his domain in Hanzhong came under Cao Cao's control (January 216). Against the advice of his followers to move south and attack Liu Bei in Yi Province, Cao Cao withdrew his armies and left Xiahou Yuan in command of a small force to defend Hanzhong. The following year, Cao Cao pressured Emperor Xian into granting him a title of nobility, "King of Wei". Over the next few years, Cao Cao's style of living became more like the emperor's, and he also received greater honours.

In 217, Liu Bei started a campaign to seize Hanzhong from Cao Cao. After Xiahou Yuan was defeated and killed at the Battle of Mount Dingjun in 219, Cao Cao became alarmed and quickly arrived with reinforcements to resist Liu Bei. Both sides became locked in a stalemate, except for a clash at the Battle of Han River, before Cao Cao eventually decided to withdraw his forces, giving up Hanzhong to Liu Bei. Liu Bei subsequently declared himself "King of Hanzhong" after his victory.

=== Breaking of the Sun–Liu alliance (219–220) ===
Around the time when Liu Bei was attacking Hanzhong, Guan Yu also advanced north from Jing Province to attack Cao Cao's city of Fancheng (樊城; present-day Fancheng District, Xiangyang, Hubei), which was defended by Cao Ren. While Cao Ren managed to hold on to his position firmly, Guan Yu besieged the city, and the situation was serious enough that Cao Cao even considered moving the capital away from Xu.

At the same time, Sun Quan became increasingly resentful of Guan Yu because the latter had previously shown hostility towards him in three incidents: Guan Yu drove away from the official's Sun Quan sent to the three commanderies that Liu Bei had promised to give up to Sun; Guan Yu forcefully seized food supplies from one of Sun Quan's bases for use in his Fancheng campaign; Guan Yu ridiculed Sun Quan when the latter proposed a marriage between his son and Guan's daughter. When Guan Yu was away attacking Fancheng, Sun Quan sent his general Lü Meng to launch an assault on Jing Province from the east, swiftly conquering the province within weeks. The morale of Guan Yu's forces fell sharply and his soldiers gradually deserted him until he was left with only about 300 men. Guan Yu was isolated and besieged by Sun Quan's forces in Maicheng, and he attempted to break out but fell into an ambush and was captured. Guan Yu refused to surrender and was eventually executed on Sun Quan's order. This marked the end of the alliance between Sun Quan and Liu Bei. Sun Quan nominally submitted to Cao Cao and was granted the title of "Marquis of Wu". Sun Quan also urged Cao Cao to take the emperor's throne but Cao declined.

== Emperor Xian's abdication (220) and aftermath ==
Cao Cao died in March 220 and his son Cao Pi inherited the title of "King of Wei" without waiting for formal authorization from Emperor Xian. In the winter of 220, Emperor Xian sent the Imperial Seal to Cao Pi and issued an edict announcing that he was abdicating in favour of Cao Pi. Cao Pi formally declined to accept the throne thrice but obliged eventually. The Han dynasty officially ended at that point and Cao Pi established the state of Cao Wei in its place, moving the capital from Xu back to Luoyang. The dethroned Emperor Xian was granted the title of "Duke of Shanyang".

In 221, Liu Bei declared himself emperor in Chengdu and established the state of Shu Han. Sun Quan continued to remain as a nominal subject of Cao Pi until 222, when he declared himself king of a separate state, Wu (better known as Eastern Wu in history). In 229, Sun Quan formally became emperor of Wu.
