= Xu You (Han dynasty) =

Advisor to warlords Yuan Shao and Cao Cao (died 204)

- Born: Unknown
- Died: After 203
- Occupations: Strategist, advisor

Xu You
- Traditional Chinese: 許攸
- Simplified Chinese: 许攸
Transcriptions
Standard Mandarin
- Hanyu Pinyin: Xǔ Yōu
- Wade–Giles: Hsü Yu

Ziyuan (courtesy name)
- Traditional Chinese: 子遠
- Simplified Chinese: 子远
Transcriptions
Standard Mandarin
- Hanyu Pinyin: Zĭyuǎn
- Wade–Giles: Tzu-yüan

Xu You (died 204), courtesy name Ziyuan, was an adviser during the late Eastern Han dynasty of China. He served under the warlord Yuan Shao from 191 to 200 and then under the warlord and Grand chancellor of the Han Cao Cao from 200 until he was executed by the latter in 204 during the End of the Han dynasty.

== Life ==
Little is recorded about Xu You in history. The first mention of him was in 184, when he plotted with Wang Fen (王芬), the Inspector of Ji Province, and other officials to overthrow Emperor Ling (r. 168–189) and replace him with the Marquis of Hefei (合肥侯). Xu You tried to persuade Cao Cao, a friend of his, to participate in the plot but Cao Cao refused. Eventually, the plot failed and Wang Fen committed suicide while Xu You fled.

Around 191, after the warlord Yuan Shao seized control of Ji Province from its governor Han Fu, he recruited Xu You to serve as an adviser under him. During this time, Xu You advised Yuan Shao to maintain an alliance with Cao Cao, who had also become a warlord based in the Henan region south of Yuan Shao's territories in Hebei.

In 195 or 196, Xu You advised Yuan Shao to welcome the figurehead Emperor Xian to Ji Province so that he can control the emperor and use him as a "trump card" against rival warlords. However, Yuan Shao heeded the advice of his other advisers instead and let the opportunity slip by. Eventually, Cao Cao received Emperor Xian and brought him to his base in Xu (許; present-day Xuchang, Henan), which became the new imperial capital. Xu You felt disgruntled with Yuan Shao for not heeding his advice.

In 200, when the Battle of Guandu broke out between Yuan Shao and Cao Cao, Xu You advised Yuan Shao to adopt a slow, steady and step-by-step approach towards attacking Cao Cao, but Yuan Shao again refused to listen as he preferred an all-out approach. Xu You, who was notorious for being greedy and corrupt, had allowed his family members to solicit bribes and commit crimes. Shen Pei, another of Yuan Shao's subordinates who was in charge of coordinating the mobilisation of troops for the Guandu campaign, had Xu You's family members arrested. Shen Pei then reported it to Yuan Shao, who scolded Xu You. Xu You, fearing that he had fallen out of Yuan Shao's favour, escaped from Yuan Shao's camp and defected to Cao Cao's side. Cao Cao was so overjoyed when he heard of his old friend's arrival that he even forgot to wear his shoes when he came out to welcome Xu You. Xu You pointed out the location of Yuan Shao's supply depot at Wuchao (烏巢) and urged Cao Cao to attack Wuchao and destroy Yuan Shao's supplies to force the enemy to retreat. During the battle Xu You advocated the execution of Yuan Shao's soldiers. Cao Cao led a successful raid on Wuchao and destroyed all of Yuan Shao's supplies, leading to his eventual victory over Yuan Shao at the Battle of Guandu.

During the Battle of Ye in 204, Xu You advised Cao Cao to direct the waters of the Zhang River (漳河) to flood Ye city, the capital of Ji Province. Cao Cao was thus able to conquer Ji Province. Xu You became increasingly arrogant as he believed that he had made great contributions in helping Cao Cao defeat Yuan Shao. He often behaved rudely and disrespectfully in front of Cao Cao, including calling Cao Cao by his childhood name. Although Cao Cao appeared to laugh off Xu You's behaviour, he secretly bore a grudge against Xu You. One day, when Xu You passed through the gates of Ye city, he told everyone that Cao Cao would not have been able to enter Ye city without his help. Cao Cao could no longer tolerate Xu You's behaviour so he ordered Xu You's arrest and eventual execution.

== Romance of the Three Kingdoms ==
In Romance of the Three Kingdoms, Xu You is portrayed as a childhood friend of Cao Cao's. His defection and the events leading up to his death are similar. After the Cao occupation of Jizhou, Xu Chu overhears Xu's boasting. He is killed and his head brought to Cao Cao, who scolds Xu Chu, and orders a lavish burial for his friend. It is not made clear whether Cao's gesture is genuine.

== In popular culture ==
Xu You was played by Xu Maomao in the 2010 television series Three Kingdoms. He also makes an appearance in the Dynasty Warriors series of video games.

== See also ==
- Lists of people of the Three Kingdoms
