= Guo Tu =

Adviser under warlords Yuan Shao and Yuan Tan (died 205)

Guo Tu 郭圖
- Born: Unknown; Xuchang, Henan
- Died: 205; Nanpi County, Hebei
- Other name: Gongze (公則)
- Occupations: Official, adviser

Guo Tu (died 205), courtesy name Gongze, was a senior official and adviser serving under the warlords Yuan Shao and Yuan Tan during the late Eastern Han dynasty of China.

== Life ==
Guo Tu was from Yingchuan Commandery (潁川郡), which is around present-day Xuchang, Henan. He started his career as a subordinate of Han Fu, the Governor of Ji Province. In 191, Guo Tu, along with Xin Ping, Xun Chen and others, managed to convince Han Fu to relinquish his governorship to the warlord Yuan Shao. Guo Tu then became an adviser to Yuan Shao.

In 195, the Han Emperor Xian called for help from the warlords, pleading them to escort him and the imperial court away from the tyrants Li Jue and Guo Si. Yuan Shao's strategist Ju Shou advised Yuan Shao to take the emperor in and use him as a puppet to control and manipulate the other warlords. Just as Yuan Shao was about to agree and send out an army to rescue the Emperor, Guo Tu objected and said Emperor Xian would control him, not the other way round. (Note: However, Yuan Shao's biography in Sanguozhi recorded that it was Guo Tu who suggested to Yuan Shao to take the emperor in. When annotating Yuan Shao's biography in Sanguozhi, Pei Songzhi cited the Xiandi Zhuan, which like the Houhanshu also recorded that Ju Shou was the one who suggested taking in Emperor Xian. Pei then noted that the account in Xiandi Zhuan contradicted the account found in Yuan Shao's biography in Sanguozhi. In vol.03 of Zizhi Tongjian Kaoyi, Sima Guang noted that Tongjian adopted the account found in Yuan Shao's biography in Fan Ye's Houhanshu.) Yuan Shao was persuaded by it and did not rescue the Emperor. As a result, the much less powerful warlord Cao Cao took Emperor Xian into his capital of Xuchang and issued many edicts in the Emperor's name, including a harshly worded edict condemning Yuan Shao for conquering Han provinces from other governors.

During the Battle of Boma in 200, Yuan Shao ordered Yan Liang, with Guo Tu and Chunyu Qiong providing support, to lead troops to attack Boma (白馬; near present-day Hua County, Henan), which was defended by Liu Yan (劉延), a military officer under Yuan Shao's rival Cao Cao. Yan Liang lost the battle and was slain by Guan Yu, who was then a subordinate of Cao Cao.

Later that year, during the Battle of Guandu, Cao Cao led a successful raid on Yuan Shao's supply depot at Wuchao (烏巢) and set fire to the supplies. Zhang He and Gao Lan (高覽), two of Yuan Shao's officers, wanted to lead troops to attack Cao Cao at Wuchao and salvage whatever supplies they could. However, Guo Tu strongly objected to this plan and proposed that they attack Cao Cao's main camp instead to divert Cao Cao's attention away from Wuchao. Yuan Shao heeded Guo Tu's advice and ordered Zhang He and Gao Lan to lead troops to attack Cao Cao's main camp. When news reached Yuan Shao that Zhang He and Gao Lan had failed to capture Cao Cao's main camp, Guo Tu became fearful because his idea had gone wrong. He then accused Zhang He and Gao Lan of not doing their best because they were planning to defect. After Zhang He and Gao Lan heard about it, they were so angry that they led their troops and defected to Cao Cao's side.

Shen Pei's two sons were captured by Cao Cao's forces during the Battle of Guandu. After the battle, Meng Dai (孟岱), one of Yuan Shao's subordinates, slandered Shen Pei in front of Yuan Shao. Guo Tu and Xin Ping agreed with what Meng Dai said, so Yuan Shao removed Shen Pei from his command in Ye city and replaced him with Meng Dai.

In 202, following Yuan Shao's death, his subordinates became polarised into two camps because Yuan Shao did not clearly designate one of his sons as his successor. In one camp, Pang Ji, Shen Pei and others supported Yuan Shang and wanted him to be the new Governor of Ji Province. In the other camp, Xin Ping, Guo Tu and others supported Yuan Tan, Yuan Shao's eldest son. Pang Ji and Shen Pei feared that Yuan Tan would harm them if he came to power so they lied that Yuan Shao had named Yuan Shang as his successor on his deathbed. Yuan Tan retreated to Liyang County (黎陽縣; present-day Xun County, Henan) and appointed himself General of Chariots and Cavalry (車騎將軍) there.

Internal conflict soon broke out between Yuan Shang and Yuan Tan, but they cooperated when Cao Cao led his forces to attack them. After Cao Cao retreated, the Yuan brothers started fighting again for control over northern China. In 205, Cao Cao defeated Yuan Tan at the Battle of Nanpi and eliminated him, along with Guo Tu and his other subordinates.

== See also ==
- Lists of people of the Three Kingdoms
