= AD 127 =

127 in various calendars
- Gregorian calendar: 127; CXXVII
- Ab urbe condita: 880
- Assyrian calendar: 4877
- Balinese saka calendar: 48–49
- Bengali calendar: −467 – −466
- Berber calendar: 1077
- Buddhist calendar: 671
- Burmese calendar: −511
- Byzantine calendar: 5635–5636
- Chinese calendar: 丙寅年 (Fire Tiger); 2824 or 2617 — to — 丁卯年 (Fire Rabbit); 2825 or 2618
- Coptic calendar: −157 – −156
- Discordian calendar: 1293
- Ethiopian calendar: 119–120
- Hebrew calendar: 3887–3888
- Hindu calendars
- Vikram Samvat: 183–184
- Shaka Samvat: 48–49
- Kali Yuga: 3227–3228
- Holocene calendar: 10127
- Iranian calendar: 495 BP – 494 BP
- Islamic calendar: 510 BH – 509 BH
- Javanese calendar: 2–3
- Julian calendar: 127; CXXVII
- Korean calendar: 2460
- Minguo calendar: 1785 before ROC 民前1785年
- Nanakshahi calendar: −1341
- Seleucid era: 438/439 AG
- Thai solar calendar: 669–670
- Tibetan calendar: མེ་ཕོ་སྟག་ལོ་ (male Fire-Tiger); 253 or −128 or −900 — to — མེ་མོ་ཡོས་ལོ་ (female Fire-Hare); 254 or −127 or −899

Year 127 (CXXVII) was a common year starting on Tuesday of the Julian calendar. At the time, it was known as the Year of the Consulship of Rufus and Squilla (or, less frequently, year 880 Ab urbe condita). The denomination 127 for this year has been used since the early medieval period, when the Anno Domini calendar era became the prevalent method in Europe for naming years.

== Events ==
=== By place ===
==== Roman Empire ====
- Emperor Hadrian returns to Rome, after a seven-year voyage to the Roman provinces.
- Hadrian, acting on the advice of his proconsul of Asia, Gaius Minicius Fundanus, determines that Christians shall not be put to death without a trial.

==== India ====
- Kanishka I starts to rule in the Kushan Empire (approximate date).

=== By topic ===
==== Religion ====
- The philosopher Carpocrates rejects ownership of private property as being un-Christian.

== Births ==
- August 29 - Zheng Xuan, Chinese politician, philosopher (d. 200)

== Deaths ==
- Juvenal, Roman poet (approximate year)
- Plutarch, Greek historian and biographer (b. AD 46)
- Publius Metilius Nepos, Roman politician (b. AD 45)
