= Battle of Yan Ford =

Battle between warlords Yuan Shao and Cao Cao (200)

- Part of the Guandu campaign
Date	Between May and August, 200 CE
Location	Yanjin County, Henan
Result	Cao Cao victory

Belligerents
Yuan Shao	Cao Cao

Commanders and leaders
Yuan Shao; Wen Chou †; Liu Bei	Cao Cao

Strength
5,000-6,000 cavalry	<600 cavalry

Battle of Yan Ford
- Traditional Chinese: 延津之戰
- Simplified Chinese: 延津之战
Transcriptions
Standard Mandarin
- Hanyu Pinyin: Yánjīn Zhī Zhàn

The Battle of Yan Ford took place along the southern banks of the Yellow River in the late Eastern Han dynasty. The battle was closely preceded by the Battle of Boma, and was part of a series of engagements leading to the decisive confrontation between the rival warlords Yuan Shao and Cao Cao at the Battle of Guandu in 200. Following the death of one of Yuan Shao's elite generals, Yan Liang, in the previous battle, the death of another famed general Wen Chou in this battle greatly demoralised Yuan's army, which was heading towards Guandu.

== Background ==
Cao Cao and Yuan Shao were heading toward a direct confrontation since the late 190s, and the first months of 200 saw the opening of hostilities at the Battle of Boma after years of manoeuvring. With a feint, Cao Cao was able to split off Yuan Shao's main force gathered at Liyang (黎陽; northwest of present-day Xun County, Henan) across the river from Boma (白馬; near present-day Hua County, Henan) and hence relieve the siege at Boma, killing Yuan Shao's attacking general Yan Liang. Considering that the position at Boma was unsuitable for a determined defence, Cao Cao voluntarily abandoned the outpost and evacuated its population and supplies to the west along the river. With that, Yuan Shao finally crossed the Yellow River in pursuit of Cao Cao's baggage train. However, Cao Cao was not satisfied with just abandoning all lands between Guandu and the river to the enemy — he had also wanted to make his enemy pay dearly by resisting the enemy advance during the predetermined fallback to Guandu.

== The battle ==
As a result of Cao Cao's feint during the Battle of Boma, Yuan Shao had brought the advance-guard of his army up the Yellow River toward the western Yan Ford (延津; north of present-day Yanjin, Henan). It was probably at this ford that Yuan Shao's army made the crossing, which was unhindered by Cao Cao. By this time, Yuan Shao was almost due north of Cao Cao's defensive positions at Guandu and his base in the capital of Xu City.

Cao Cao's men also reached Yan Ford and made camp below a ridge known as the Southern Slope (南阪), 20 li west and 50 li south of Boma. As Cao Cao's position was on the southern side of a dyke some distance away from the river (meant to control seasonal floodwaters), his men were concealed from Yuan Shao's view while Cao Cao had to send lookouts to scout for enemy movements. The lookout first reported five to six hundred enemy cavalry on their way, then reported that there were slightly more cavalry than before and the size of the infantry force was beyond measurement. At this point Cao Cao stopped the lookout from reporting, and had his horsemen undo the saddles and release the horses.

The baggage train from Boma appeared on the road north of the dyke at this time, in plain view of Yuan Shao's men. Some of Cao Cao's officers became uneasy at the prospect of so many enemy horsemen, and suggested to return and defend the camp. Cao Cao's strategist Xun You objected, saying: "This is the way we bait the enemy! How can we leave?" Cao Cao glanced at him and smiled.

Wen Chou and Liu Bei, commanders of Yuan Shao's cavalry, leading five to six thousand cavalry, came one after the other. Cao Cao's men asked to mount their horses, but Cao Cao denied them until Yuan Shao's horsemen, ever increasing in number, split off to raid the baggage train. Cao Cao then gave the permission to mount the horses, and all of Cao Cao's horsemen, led by Zhang Liao and Xu Huang while being less than 600 in number, jumped onto their horses and charged at the enemy. Yuan Shao's army was defeated and Wen Chou was killed in action.

== Aftermath ==
Yan Liang and Wen Chou were the most highly regarded generals in Yuan Shao's army, and both were killed in two successive battles. Yuan Shao's men became greatly shaken.

With the victory at Yan Ford, Cao Cao was able to retreat back to his base in Guandu (官渡; northeast of present-day Zhongmu County, Henan) with the men and supplies without incident. Yuan Shao followed close behind and made camp at Yangwu (陽武; near present-day Yuanyang County, Henan), immediately north of Guandu. He had ignored Ju Shou's advice to leave a garrison at Yan Ford as a cautious step, and had all his forded forces concentrated at Yangwu, and now a decisive battle became imminent.

== In Romance of the Three Kingdoms ==
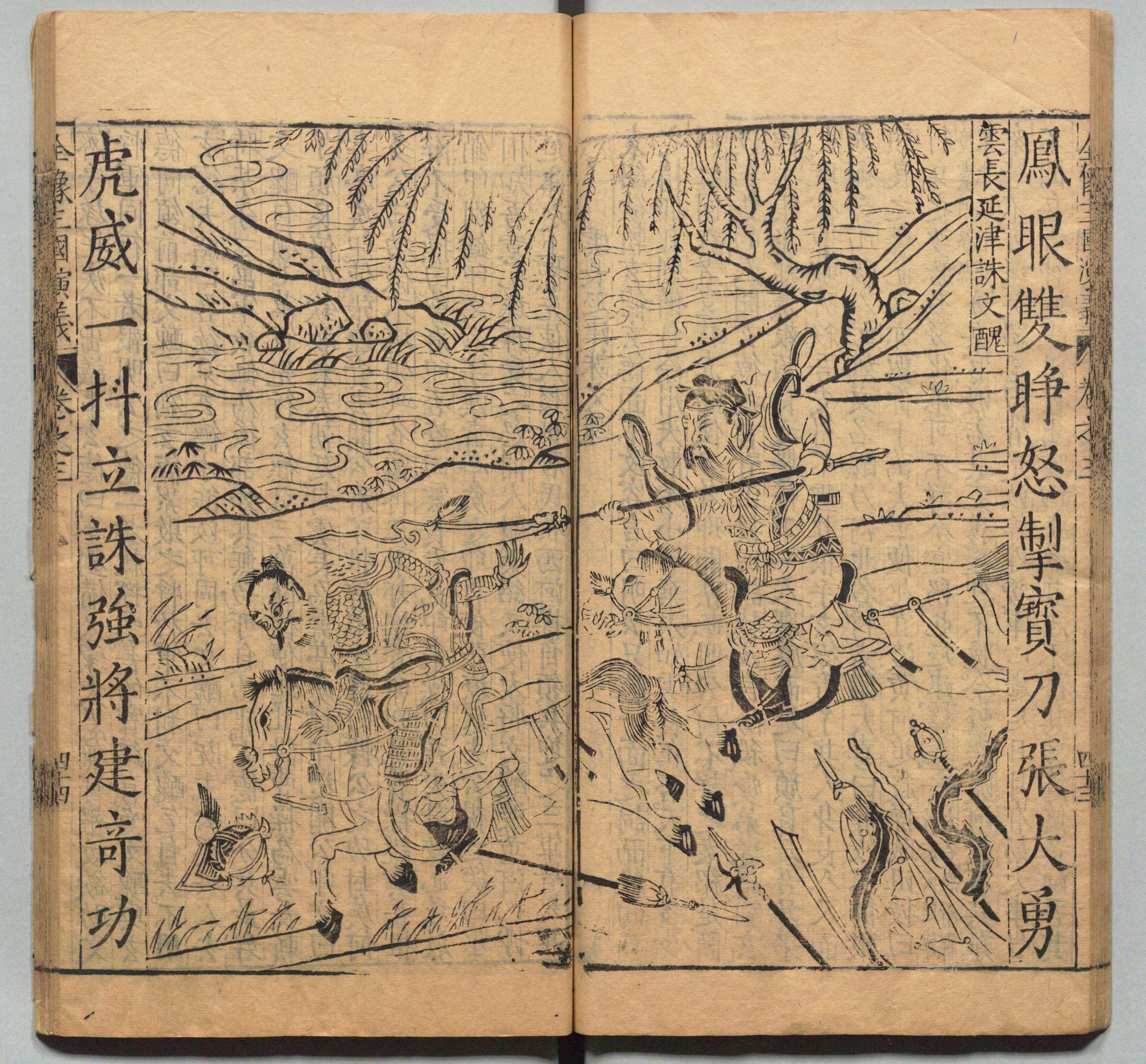
Ming dynasty woodblock print of Guan Yu slaying Wen Chou.

The Battle of Yan Ford was the opening event in chapter 26 of the 14th-century historical novel Romance of the Three Kingdoms.

The battle described in the novel closely followed the one in history until Cao Cao made the call to charge at Wen Chou's forces. At that time Zhang Liao and Xu Huang, two of Cao Cao's best generals, gave chase. Wen Chou fired two arrows from atop his horse, one of which sliced off the feather on Zhang Liao's helmet and the other hit Zhang Liao's horse in the face. Brandishing his poleaxe, Xu Huang came for Wen Chou but had to retreat when a band of enemy soldiers came to their commander's rescue.

Leading a dozen riders, Guan Yu then cut off Wen Chou's escape and engaged in a duel with the enemy. Within three bouts, Wen Chou attempted to flee. However, Guan Yu's horse, the Red Hare, was of a superior breed and soon caught up. Guan Yu then slew Wen Chou from behind.
