= Battle of Boma =

Battle between warlords Yuan Shao and Cao Cao (200)

- Part of the Guandu campaign
Date	c. March – May 200
Location	Near present-day Hua County, Henan, China
Result	Cao Cao victory

Belligerents
Yuan Shao	Cao Cao

Commanders and leaders
Yuan Shao; Yan Liang †	Cao Cao; Liu Yan; Guan Yu

Strength
~10,000 under Yan Liang	Unknown, less than Yuan Shao

Battle of Boma
- Traditional Chinese: 白馬之戰
- Simplified Chinese: 白马之战
Transcriptions
Standard Mandarin
- Hanyu Pinyin: Bómǎ zhī zhàn

The Battle of Boma or Battle of Baima (Note: Both bái and bó are variant readings of the character 白.) was the first of a series of battles that led to the decisive Battle of Guandu between the warlords Yuan Shao and Cao Cao in northern China in the late Eastern Han dynasty of China. Although Cao Cao won the battle and Yuan Shao lost his elite general Yan Liang, Cao eventually abandoned his position in Boma to entrench at the strategically important Guandu.

== Background ==
By the 190s, the Eastern Han dynasty had fractured into warlordism. After years of reconfigurations and annexations, northern China was divided along the Yellow River by two warlords: Yuan Shao to the north and his former ally Cao Cao to the south. As it became obvious that a confrontation was inevitable, the two warlords scrambled to gather their forces in defensive positions along the Yellow River.

At the time, Boma (白馬; near present-day Hua County, Henan) lay south of the river across from Liyang (黎陽; north-west of present-day Xun County, Henan), a major base for military recruits. The crossing between Boma and Liyang was deemed to be of tremendous importance as a strategic link on the main north-south route between Yuan Shao and Cao Cao's territories. Sometime between 8 September and 7 October 199, Cao Cao advanced to the vicinity of Liyang in a probing action and stationed Liu Yan (劉延), the Administrator of Dong Commandery, at Boma. The position at Boma allowed Cao Cao's forces to overlook the vital ford while serving as a first line of defence against Yuan Shao's forces. However, Cao Cao had set his sights on a concentrated confrontation at the topographically advantageous city of Guandu (官渡; northeast of present-day Zhongmu County, Henan) to the south, thus the purpose of defending Boma was only to delay enemy advances across the river.

Cao Cao also placed Yu Jin at the nearby Yan Ford (延津; north of present-day Yanjin County, Henan) with 2,000 troops and went back to the capital at Xu City to make further battle preparations. He returned to his battle command at Guandu after putting down Liu Bei's rebellion in Xu Province sometime between February 3 and March 2, 200.

== The battle ==
Between March 3 and April 1, 200, Yuan Shao sent his general Yan Liang with Guo Tu and Chunyu Qiong across the river to attack Liu Yan's position at Boma, while Yuan stayed behind at Liyang with the main army to give the impression that he was crossing the river. Earlier, Yuan Shao's advisor Ju Shou had objected to letting Yan Liang lead the attack, saying that Yan Liang was brave but impatient and unable to manage the task alone, but Yuan Shao ignored his advice.

Liu Yan's small garrison of troops at Boma apparently offered some stubborn resistance, as the siege dragged on for at least 32 days until May, prompting Cao Cao to lead troops in relief of Boma. If Cao Cao had previously considered the position expendable, then Cao Cao might have been motivated by the time gained by the resistance as well as the need to repair the damage in men, supplies and morale.

As Yuan Shao's forces at Liyang was numerically superior to Cao Cao's forces, Cao Cao's strategist Xun You suggested seeking to split Yuan Shao's forces using a diversionary tactic and take out the less capable Yan Liang. Cao Cao adhered to this plan and marched towards Yan Ford as if trying to cross the river to attack Yuan Shao's rear. Reacting to this apparent threat, Yuan Shao split off his men in Liyang and came west along the northern bank of the river, thus falling for the feint. Rapidly, Cao Cao led light troops east toward Boma, and engaged a startled Yan Liang some ten li west of the outpost. Cao Cao sent Zhang Liao, Xu Huang and Guan Yu (now supporting Cao Cao after Liu Bei was defeated in Xu Province) to lead the vanguard. Noticing Yan Liang's standard from afar, Guan Yu charged through thousands of enemy troops toward Yan Liang, killed him with a stroke, decapitated him, and returned with Yan's head. Thus the siege of Boma was broken.

== Aftermath ==
After the victory at Boma, Cao Cao considered the outpost at Boma untenable and evacuated its population to the west towards Yan Ford. With that, Yuan Shao finally crossed the river in pursuit, attacking the baggage train along the southern bank of the river. In what was to become the Battle of Yan Ford, the plundering party was lured into an ambush set up by Cao Cao, killing another of Yuan Shao's famed generals, Wen Chou. Thus Cao Cao was able to deal a devastating blow to the enemy's morale and retreat back to Guandu unmolested, where Cao Cao had prepared for the eventual showdown.

For his efforts, Guan Yu was enfeoffed with the rank of marquis. However, thinking that by killing Yan Liang he had done Cao Cao a great service and repaid Cao Cao's generosity, Guan Yu left behind all he had received from Cao Cao with a note of parting and returned to Liu Bei. Cao Cao, in admiration of Guan Yu's loyalty, did not allow his generals to give pursuit.

== In Romance of the Three Kingdoms ==
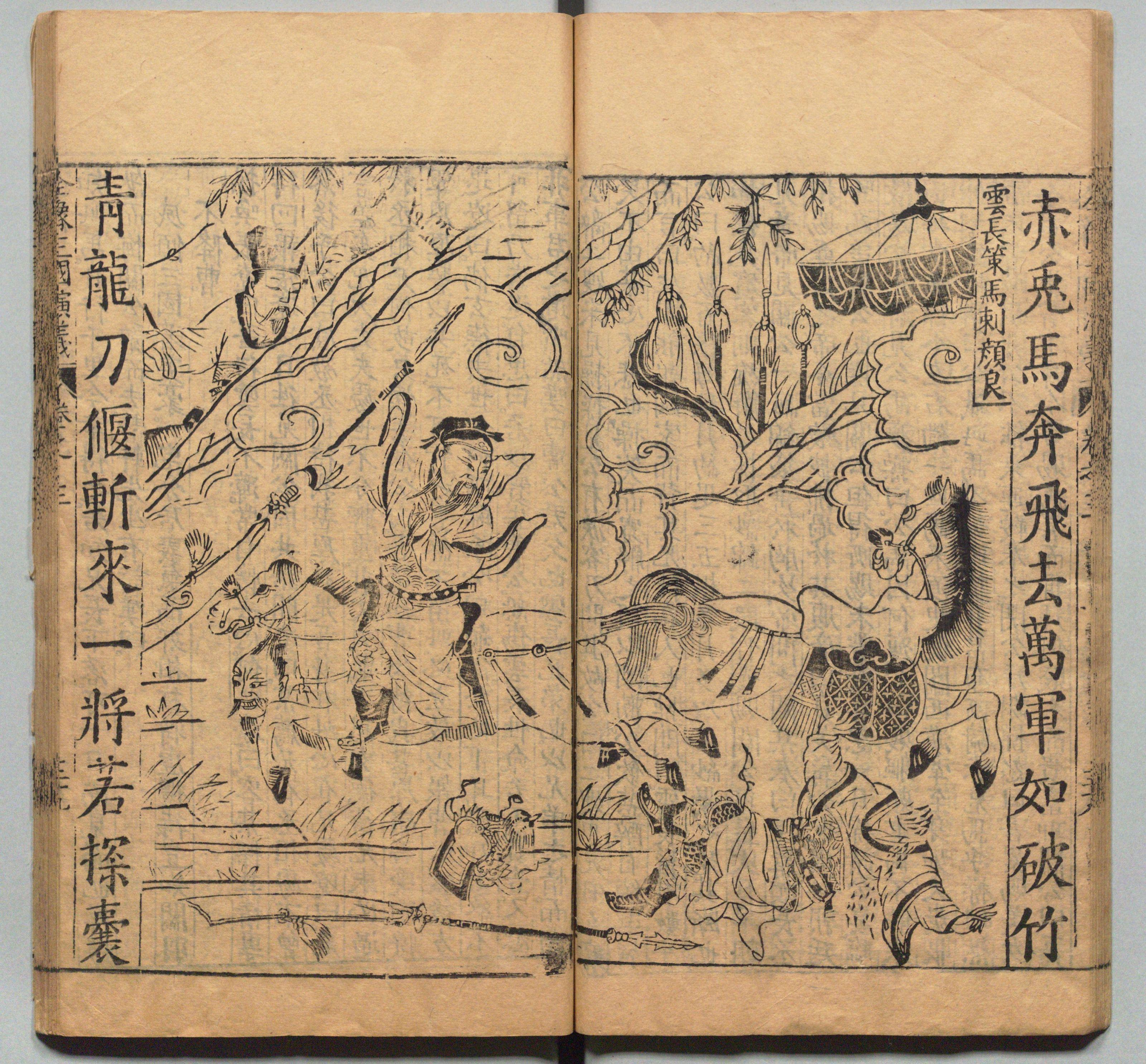
Woodblock print of Guan Yu slaying Yan Liang.

The Battle of Boma was mentioned in Chapter 25 of the 14th-century historical novel Romance of the Three Kingdoms as follows:

With some 100,000 men as the vanguard, Yan Liang attacked Liu Yan at Boma. Answering Liu Yan's repeated requests for aid, Cao Cao launched 150,000 men split into three prongs to relieve Boma. Guan Yu, who had recently pledged service to Cao Cao and was the subject of many rewards by Cao Cao, wanted to participate in the battle against Yan Liang to repay Cao Cao's generosity, but Cao Cao did not think it was necessary to use Guan Yu yet. Cao Cao personally led 50,000 men to engage Yan Liang, but was awed by Yan's arrays of elite troops. Song Xian (宋憲) and Wei Xu (魏續), two former generals under Lü Bu, each volunteered to duel Yan Liang, but were both killed in a short time. Xu Huang also rode out to challenge Yan Liang, but he came back defeated after 20 bouts. Both armies ceased battle for the day.

As suggested by his advisor Cheng Yu, Cao Cao then hesitantly summoned Guan Yu, fearing that the latter would leave him once he had repaid his kindness. The next day, as Yan Liang's army lined up on the battlefield, Guan Yu sat with Cao Cao on a hilltop and looked down. From afar he saw Yan Liang under the army standard. Leaping onto his steed, the Red Hare, Guan Yu galloped straight into the enemy ranks, which broke before him like waves before a swift vessel. Before Yan Liang could fight back, he was struck down by Guan Yu. Guan severed Yan Liang's head, tied it to the neck of his steed, and rode back unhindered. Yan Liang's men became demoralized and fell into chaos, providing an opportunity for Cao Cao to attack. The battle of Boma was thus won with uncountable enemy dead and much plundering of supplies.
