= Ju Shou =

Chinese advisor serving warlord Yuan Shao (died 200)

- 沮授
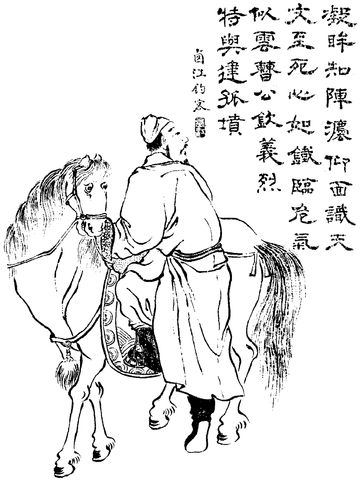
- A Qing dynasty illustration of Ju Shou

General of Vehement Might (奮威將軍) (under Yuan Shao)
- In office c. 191 – 200
- Monarch: Emperor Xian of Han

Army Supervisor (監軍) (under Yuan Shao)
- In office c. 191 – 200
- Monarch: Emperor Xian of Han

Cavalry Commandant (騎都尉) (under Han Fu)
- In office ? – 191
- Monarch: Emperor Xian of Han

Attendant Officer (別駕) (under Han Fu)
- In office ? – 191
- Monarch: Emperor Xian of Han

Personal details
- Born: Unknown Quzhou County, Hebei
- Died: c.November 200
- Relations: Ju Zong (brother)
- Children: Ju Hu
- Occupation: Official, adviser

Ju Shou (died c.November 200) was an adviser serving under the warlord Yuan Shao during the late Eastern Han dynasty of China.

== Life ==
Ju Shou was from Guangping County (廣平縣), Julu Commandery (鉅鹿郡), which is in present-day Quzhou County, Hebei. He was allegedly a descendant of Ju Song (沮誦), who served as a historian under the mythical Yellow Emperor. Known for being ambitious since he was a child, he was particularly interested in strategy. He started his career as an Attendant Officer (別駕) under Han Fu, the Governor of Ji Province, probably sometime in the reign of Emperor Ling (r. 168–189). During this time, he was nominated as a maocai (茂才; outstanding civil service candidate) and held office as the Prefect (令) of two counties in Ji Province. Han Fu later recommended him to be a Cavalry Commandant (騎都尉).

In 191, Ju Shou came to serve the warlord Yuan Shao after Han Fu relinquished his governorship of Ji Province to Yuan Shao. He proposed to Yuan Shao a grand plan: conquer Ji, Qing, You and Bing provinces in northern China, recruit all the talents in these four provinces, and bring the figurehead Emperor Xian (r. 189–220) to Ji Province. Yuan Shao was so pleased that he appointed Ju Shou as an Army Supervisor (監軍) and General of Vehement Might (奮威將軍).

In 195, when Emperor Xian was in Luoyang, Ju Shou advised Yuan Shao to welcome the emperor to Ye city, the capital of Ji Province, and use him as a "trump card" against rival warlords. Just when Yuan Shao was about to follow Ju Shou's advice, some of his other advisers (e.g. Guo Tu) argued that the emperor would be a "burden" rather than a "trump card" because they would have to directly take orders from him and have less autonomy. Yuan Shao thus decided not to bring Emperor Xian to Ji Province. (Note: However, Yuan Shao's biography in Sanguozhi recorded that it was Guo Tu who suggested to Yuan Shao to take the emperor in. When annotating Yuan Shao's biography in Sanguozhi, Pei Songzhi cited the Xiandi Zhuan, which like the Houhanshu also recorded that Ju Shou was the one who suggested taking in Emperor Xian. Pei then noted that the account in Xiandi Zhuan contradicted the account found in Yuan Shao's biography in Sanguozhi. In vol.03 of Zizhi Tongjian Kaoyi, Sima Guang noted that Tongjian adopted the account found in Yuan Shao's biography in Fan Ye's Houhanshu.) In the following year, Yuan Shao's rival Cao Cao brought Emperor Xian to his base in Xu (許; present-day Xuchang, Henan) and established the new imperial capital there.

In the late 190s, Yuan Shao wanted to divide his territories among his three sons by putting each son in charge of one province and assess their capabilities. However, Ju Shou strongly objected to this idea and argued that it would sow the seeds for internal conflict later. Yuan Shao ignored him and went ahead by putting his eldest son Yuan Tan in charge of Qing Province, his second son Yuan Xi in charge of You Province, his maternal nephew Gao Gan in charge of Bing Province, while his third son Yuan Shang would succeed him as the Governor of Ji Province. Ju Shou's prediction came true as conflict broke out between Yuan Tan and Yuan Shang almost immediately after Yuan Shao's death in 202.

In 199, after Yuan Shao eliminated his northern rival Gongsun Zan and gained complete control over the four provinces in northern China, he planned to attack Cao Cao in the south. Ju Shou and Tian Feng, another of Yuan Shao's advisers, urged him to adopt a slow, steady and step-by-step approach towards attacking Cao Cao because it was to their advantage. However, Yuan Shao did not heed Ju Shou and Tian Feng's advice and prepared for an all-out invasion, which led to the Battle of Guandu in 200. Before Yuan Shao embarked on his campaign against Cao Cao, Ju Shou gathered all his family members and relatives and told them to divide the family fortune and disperse, because he knew that the Ju family would be in trouble if Yuan Shao lost the battle. Ju Shou's younger brother, Ju Zong (沮宗), disagreed that Yuan Shao would lose, but Ju Shou insisted that he was right.

In 200, before the Battle of Boma (a prelude to the Battle of Guandu), Ju Shou warned Yuan Shao not to put Yan Liang in charge of leading the attack on Cao Cao's garrison at Boma (白馬; near present-day Hua County, Henan) because Yan Liang was petty and narrow-minded. Yuan Shao ignored him and sent Yan Liang anyway. Yan Liang was killed in action. Before Yuan Shao's main army crossed the Yellow River, Ju Shou advised Yuan Shao to remain at Yan Ford (延津) and send detachments to attack Cao Cao's camp at Guandu (官渡) instead of going all-out to attack Guandu. When Yuan Shao did not heed his advice, Ju Shou sighed, claimed that he was ill and refused to meet anyone. Yuan Shao became very unhappy with Ju Shou and he gave command of Ju Shou's units to Guo Tu instead.

After Yuan Shao lost the Battle of Yan Ford (a follow-up to the Battle of Boma), Ju Shou urged him to change strategy and fight a long-term war with Cao Cao so as to gradually wear down Cao Cao's forces over time. However, Yuan Shao refused to listen and insisted on sending his troops on an all-out confrontation with Cao Cao. In the initial stages of the Battle of Guandu, after Cao Cao's forces attacked one of Yuan Shao's supply convoys, Yuan Shao ordered his general Chunyu Qiong to take charge of transporting supplies and defend the supply depot at Wuchao (烏巢). When Ju Shou advised Yuan Shao to send Jiang Qi (蔣奇) to lead a unit to escort the supply convoy, Yuan Shao ignored him again. Yuan Shao ultimately lost the Battle of Guandu against Cao Cao when the latter led a successful raid on Wuchao and destroyed all of Yuan Shao's supplies.

Ju Shou was captured by Cao Cao's men while Yuan Shao's forces were retreating after their defeat. When he was brought before Cao Cao, he remained stubborn and refused to surrender. Cao Cao not only did not harm him, but also treated him well even though he was a prisoner-of-war. Ju Shou was later killed by Cao Cao's men while attempting to escape and return to Yuan Shao.

== Family ==
Ju Shou had a son, Ju Hu (沮鵠), who served under Yuan Shang after the latter succeeded his father as the Governor of Ji Province. Ju Hu was killed in action during the Battle of Ye in 204 against Cao Cao's forces.

== See also ==
- Lists of people of the Three Kingdoms
