= Battle of Guandu =

Battle between warlords Cao Cao and Yuan Shao (200)

Coordinates: 34°54′26″N 114°37′13″E

- Part of the wars at the end of the Han dynasty
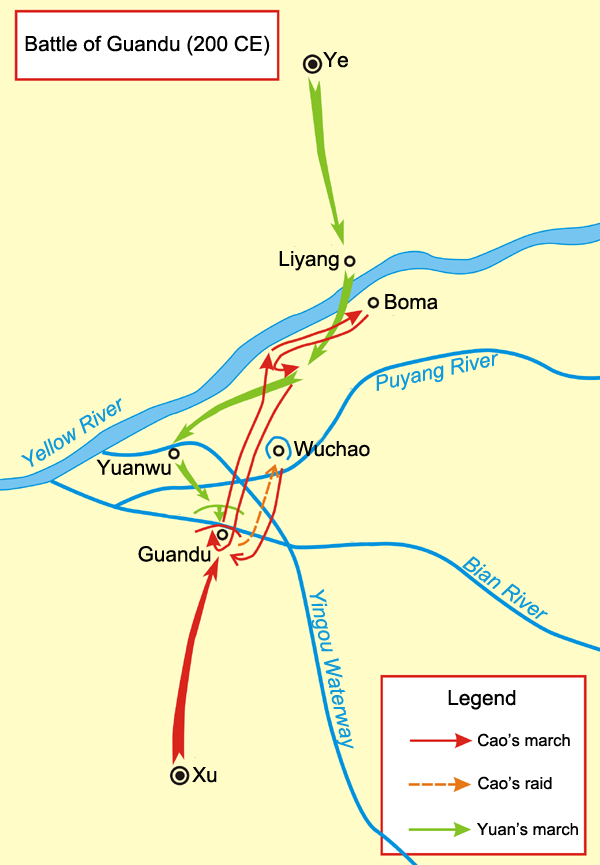
- A map of the battle. It shows the movements during the battles of Boma and Yan Ford. Flanking attempts are not shown. Note that the Yellow River has changed course over the centuries and the places depicted are no longer at the same locations relative to the river.
| Date | September–November 200 |
| Location | Northeast of present-day Zhongmu County, Henan |
| Result | Cao Cao victory |

Belligerents
| Cao Cao | Yuan Shao |

Commanders and leaders
| Cao Cao; Cao Hong; Guo Jia; Xun Yu; Cheng Yu; Xun You; Zhang Liao; Xu Chu; Yue Jin; Xu Huang; Yu Jin; Xiahou Yuan | Yuan Shao; Chunyu Qiong (executed); Guo Tu; Tian Feng (executed); Ju Shou (executed); Shen Pei; Yan Liang †; Wen Chou †; Zhang He (surrendered); Yuan Tan; Liu Bei |

Strength
| About 40,000 | ~110,000 |

Casualties and losses
| ~8,000 | ~80,000 |

Battle of Guandu
- Traditional Chinese: 官渡之戰
- Simplified Chinese: 官渡之战
Transcriptions
Standard Mandarin
- Hanyu Pinyin: Guāndù Zhī Zhàn

The Battle of Guandu was fought between the warlords Cao Cao and Yuan Shao in 200 AD in the late Eastern Han dynasty. Cao Cao's decisive victory against Yuan Shao's numerically superior forces marked the turning point in their war. The victory was also the point at which Cao Cao became the dominant power in northern China, leading to the establishment of the state of Cao Wei in the Three Kingdoms period.

== Background ==
The inevitability of military conflict between Cao Cao and Yuan Shao had become apparent by 196. Yuan Shao held control of the lands north of the Yellow River, namely the Hebei region, while Cao Cao controlled most of the lands south of the Yellow River after he defeated Lü Bu at the Battle of Xiapi in 199 and kept Emperor Xian with him in the new capital city of Xu. The warlords saw each other as the obvious impediment to their individual ambitions to conquer and rule China.

Some years before the battle, Yuan Shao's advisors Ju Shou and Tian Feng warned that Cao Cao would become a threat to their lord in his ambition to dominate China. They advised Yuan Shao to attack Cao Cao when the latter was still building up his forces, but Yuan Shao ignored their advice as Cao Cao was still nominally an ally. Tension between Cao Cao and Yuan Shao increased after Cao Cao moved Emperor Xian from the old capital Luoyang.

== Prelude ==
The geographical position of Guandu (官渡; northeast of present-day Zhongmu County, Henan) made it a strategically vital position. It was near Yan Ford (延津; north of present-day Yanjin County, Henan) on the Yellow River and lay on the road leading to the capital city Xu. Cao Cao recognized its strategic importance and in the autumn of 199, he stationed troops there and prepared fortifications. Other deployments along the frontline included Liu Yan (劉延) at Boma (白馬; near present-day Hua County, Henan), Yu Jin at Yan Ford, Cheng Yu at Juancheng (鄄城; near present-day Juancheng County, Shandong), and Xiahou Dun at Meng Ford (孟津; present-day Mengjin County, Henan). At the same time, Cao Cao sent Zang Ba to harass Qing Province (青州), which was governed by Yuan Shao's son Yuan Tan, to prevent his eastern flank from coming under attack.

In the first month of 200, Liu Bei rebelled against Cao Cao and seized Xu Province after killing Che Zhou (車冑), Cao Cao's appointed Inspector (刺史) of Xu Province. Cao Cao, in an unexpected move, left his northern front exposed to Yuan Shao and turned east to retake Xu Province. Yuan Shao tried to use the opportunity to start a campaign south, but was daunted by Yu Jin, the defender of Yan Ford.

When Cao Cao returned to Guandu after his victory over Liu Bei, who sought refuge under Yuan Shao afterwards, Yuan Shao decided to renew the campaign against Cao Cao. The aide-de-camp (參軍) Tian Feng, who had urged Yuan Shao to attack Cao Cao while he was away, advised against such a campaign, reasoning that they had lost their chance and must wait. Yuan Shao ignored Tian Feng's repeated remonstrations and imprisoned him under charges of demoralizing the army.

Shortly after, Yuan Shao had Chen Lin draft a document condemning Cao Cao in what was essentially a declaration of war, and marched his main army toward the forward base of Liyang (黎陽; northwest of present-day Xun County, Henan) north of the river. At the time, Yuan Shao's army boasted of numbers up to 110,000, including 10,000 cavalry.

== Skirmishes along the Yellow River ==
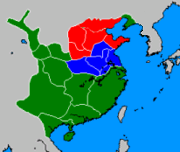
Territories of Yuan Shao (red) and Cao Cao (blue) at the time of the battle

Yuan Shao's general Yan Liang crossed the Yellow River and besieged Cao Cao's fort at Boma. Heeding his advisor Xun You's advice, Cao Cao led a battalion toward Yan Ford as a feint to trick Yuan Shao into believing that Cao Cao would attack his camp on the other side of the river. Yuan Shao split off his troops from Liyang to counter Cao Cao's attack, leaving Yan Liang without any support at Boma. Cao Cao then struck eastward to lift the siege on Boma. In the ensuing battle, Yan Liang was killed by Guan Yu and Yuan Shao's army was routed.

Cao Cao decided to abandon the fort and evacuate its occupants to the south. Taking advantage of the situation, Wen Chou and Liu Bei led 6,000 horsemen in pursuit. Cao Cao anticipated the attack and prepared a distraction tactic. He ordered his troops to discard their steeds, weapons and other valuables along the way. Yuan Shao's forces broke their ranks to grab the valuables lying ahead. Just as they were claiming the items, 600 of Cao Cao's elite cavalry led by Zhang Liao and Xu Huang that had been lying in ambush attacked them. Yuan Shao's commander Wen Chou was killed and Liu Bei fled. Having lost two of their generals in these relatively minor skirmishes prior to the primary conflict at Guandu resulted in a crushing blow to the morale of Yuan Shao's army.

== Advance on Yangwu and flanking attempts ==
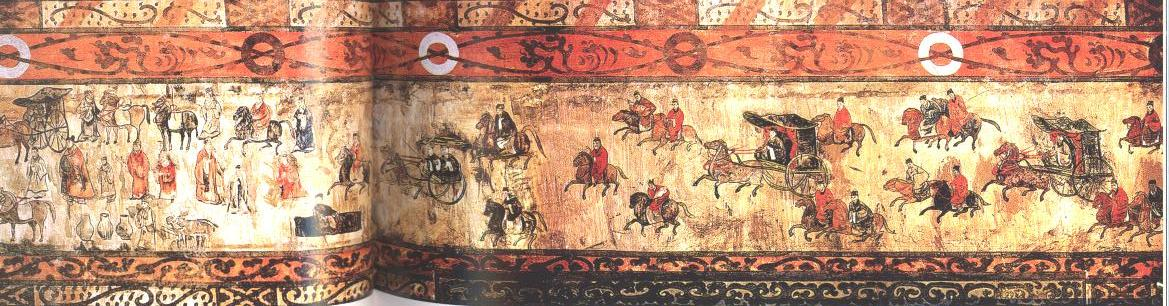
Mural showing cavalry and chariots, from the Dahuting Tomb of the late Eastern Han dynasty (25-220 AD), located in Zhengzhou, Henan province, China

Despite having won the preliminary battles, Cao Cao was still outnumbered. He abandoned the forward bases along the Yellow River in preparation for a determined defence at Guandu. Cao Cao also ordered his officials in charge of his lands in his absence to govern with lenience, so as to minimise chances of chaos within the civilian community that could affect his army's morale.

After the engagements at the river, Yuan Shao's army pushed to Yangwu (陽武; near present-day Yuanyang County, Henan), directly north of Guandu, and began constructing earthen fortifications. He ignored Cheng Yu's bastion of 700 men at Juancheng and missed an opportunity to attack Cao Cao's eastern flank, exactly as Cheng Yu's predicted earlier when he guessed that Yuan Shao would ignore a position with so few men. Yuan Shao's Attendant Officer (從事) Ju Shou had reservations about concentrating all of the main army at Yangwu, and suggested leaving a garrison at Yan Ford as a precaution in case the attack on Guandu did not go well. Yuan Shao ignored the suggestion again. Ju Shou, in despair, tried to excuse himself by claiming to be ill, but Yuan Shao became annoyed at him and would not grant him leave. Instead, he divested Ju Shou's men and divided them under the commands of Guo Tu and Chunyu Qiong.

Yuan Shao reorganized his forces and sent Liu Bei with an army to support the rebellions against Cao Cao in Yinjiang (㶏疆; southwest of present-day Xuchang), just 20 li south of the capital. Although Cao Cao was concerned about such developments in his rear, his cousin Cao Ren observed that Liu Bei could not have too much control over his new men given by Yuan Shao. So Cao Cao sent Cao Ren to deal with the rebellion. Cao Ren succeeded, killing the rebel leader Liu Pi and routing Liu Bei. Yuan Shao also tried to cut off Cao Cao from the west by sending Han Meng (韓猛) southwest. Cao Ren again responded to the threat by defeating Han Meng at Mount Jiluo (雞洛山; 50 li northeast of present-day Xinmi, Henan). Yuan Shao did not send any detached force into Cao Cao's territory after this, while Liu Bei reformed some troops and moved to assist another rebel leader, Gong Du, who was raiding Cao Cao's land. They defeated and killed one officer who led troops to attack them, Cai Yang, and would keep up raids in the area for the next few months.

At Yangwu, several war plans were presented to Yuan Shao. Ju Shou observed that Cao Cao's men were running out of grain, and thus it would be proper to enter a war of attrition, denying Cao Cao a decisive battle. Another advisor, Xu You suggested that Yuan Shao should maintain the front at Guandu but at the same time send men to circle around and capture the emperor in Xu. Yuan Shao accepted neither plan, saying he preferred to capture the emperor with a direct advance.

== Siege of Guandu ==
In the eighth month, Yuan Shao's army slowly advanced southward from Yangwu and engaged Cao Cao's men in trench warfare, behind the earthen embankments that both sides made. Both sides harassed each other with engines of war. Yuan Shao had erected siege-ramps and high platforms which allowed his men to rain arrows onto Cao Cao's forces. In response, Cao Cao's men had to carry their shields above their heads, and retaliated with traction trebuchets that destroyed the archer platforms. Yuan Shao also tried to tunnel under Cao Cao's fort, but Cao Cao had a large ditch dug within his lines to block the tunnels. Subsequently, neither side could overcome each other as Cao Cao and Yuan Shao became locked in a stalemate.

Before long, Cao Cao's army began to run short of supplies and Cao Cao was in a dilemma on whether to retreat in order to lure Yuan Shao deeper into his territory. Xun Yu, the defender of the capital Xu, sent Cao Cao a letter dissuading him from retreat. He wrote, drawing historical examples from the Chu–Han Contention:

...your military supplies are low, but they are not as bad as the situation of Chu and Han at Xingyang and Chenggao. At that time neither Liu nor Xiang were willing to be the first to retreat. The first to retreat reveals that his strength is exhausted. You, Duke, with one-tenth of the enemy's force you have held the ground you marked, and gripping him by the throat, have not let him advance for already half a year. In this situation his strength will be exhausted and there must arise some crisis. This is the time for employing unexpected stratagems; you may not miss this opportunity.

Cao Cao followed this advice and held fast to his ground. In the ninth month, Xun Yu pointed out that Yuan Shao had been storing supplies at a depot in the village of Gushi (故市; southwest of present-day Yanjin County, Henan), guarded by Han Meng. Cao Cao sent out small cavalry units led by Xu Huang and Shi Huan (史渙) to attack this position. They succeeded, routing Han Meng, disrupting Yuan Shao's supply lines, and burning his grain carts. Yuan Shao was forced to call for relief supplies in response to this raid.

== Raid on Wuchao ==
In the tenth month, Yuan Shao's general Chunyu Qiong returned with an army of 10,000 from Hebei escorting large reserves of food supplies. Yuan Shao ordered Chunyu to escort the supplies to Wuchao (烏巢; in present-day Yanjin County, Henan), a place 40 li away from Guandu near Gushi, and placed him in charge of guarding the supplies there. Yuan Shao's advisor Ju Shou argued that Wuchao, being their important supply depot, was too lightly guarded and insisted that Yuan Shao should send the general Jiang Qi (蔣奇) to serve as a perimeter guard to Chunyu Qiong and cut off any potential raids. Yuan Shao, again, did not heed Ju Shou's advice.

Shortly after, Yuan Shao's advisor Xu You, who had harboured dissatisfaction against Yuan Shao for not following his plan and having his wife arrested by Shen Pei, defected over to Cao Cao. He understood Cao Cao's shortage of supplies and alerted Cao Cao to Yuan Shao's exploitable weakness at Wuchao. Cao Cao's generals were suspicious of this piece of intelligence, but his advisors Xun You and Jia Xu urged Cao Cao to put Xu You's plan to action. Thus at night, Cao Cao and Yue Jin led 5,000 infantry and cavalry to attack Wuchao after leaving Cao Hong and Xun You in charge of his main camp at Guandu. Cao Cao's army disguised itself as a reinforcement unit from Yuan Shao and attacked Wuchao. Chunyu Qiong's initial defences were overrun, and he retreated to hold his forts, which Cao Cao attacked and set on fire.

When Yuan Shao's camp received the news that Wuchao was under attack, Zhang He urged Yuan Shao to send reinforcements to Wuchao to save the supplies, on which the fate of the campaign hinged. Guo Tu, however, advocated the opposite: attack Cao Cao's base at Guandu with the hope that Cao Cao will abandon the raid on Wuchao. Yuan Shao used Guo Tu's idea and sent Zhang He and Gao Lan to lead his main army to attack Cao Cao's main camp at Guandu, while only sending a small cavalry unit to reinforce Wuchao.

Cao Cao ignored pleas to split off his force to deal with the reinforcements and readied his men to fight to the death. The raid on Wuchao was a great success, inflicting over a thousand casualties. Yuan Shao's officers Lü Weihuang (呂威璜), Han Juzi (韓莒子), Sui Yuanjin (眭元進), and Zhao Rui (趙叡) were decapitated; Chunyu Qiong was captured by Yue Jin and had his nose cut off. Almost all of Yuan Shao's food supplies at Wuchao were burnt.

By dawn, Wuchao had turned into an inferno and the morale of Yuan Shao's army plummeted sharply due to the loss of food supplies. Cao Cao also cut off the noses of the dead, mixed them with noses and lips of oxen and horses, and showed them to Yuan Shao's men, as a form of intimidation.

Meanwhile, at Guandu, Yuan Shao's army led by Zhang He and Gao Lan failed to break through the enemy lines. Affected by the news of the defeat in Wuchao and rumors of Guo Tu making slanderous remarks about them, Zhang He and Gao Lan surrendered to Cao Hong and destroyed their weapons. Cao Cao's forces seized the opportunity to launch the full attack on Yuan's army. Yuan Shao's numerous armies were destroyed and much of his supplies were captured by Cao Cao. Yuan Shao himself fled north across the Yellow River with only about 800 cavalry, which was what was left of his army. Order was restored only when Yuan Shao reached the camp of his general Jiang Yiqu (蔣義渠), from where he gathered his straggling troops.

Some of Yuan Shao's men could not cross the Yellow River in time and were captured by Cao Cao, including Ju Shou. Some of these men had feigned surrender so they could escape later, thus Cao Cao had these men buried alive. In his proclamation of victory to Emperor Xian, Cao Cao claimed to have killed 70,000 enemy troops. (Note: Pei Songzhi wrote in an annotation in Cao Cao's biography in Sanguozhi that the sources he have seen recorded that Cao killed either 70000 or 80000 of Yuan's troops. In his Zizhi Tonjian Kaoyi, Sima Guang also noted the discrepancy in the number of casualties on Yuan Shao's side, and indicated that he used the figure found in Xiandi Qijuzhu, i.e. 70,000.)

== Aftermath ==
Cao Cao's victory at the Battle of Guandu was a decisive one and marked the turn of the tide in his struggle for power with Yuan Shao. Yuan Shao died in June of 202 and his youngest son Yuan Shang was made his successor shortly thereafter. His oldest son Yuan Tan was furious with the succession and fought with his younger brother. This resulted in internal conflict within Yuan Shao's forces. Yuan Shao's pool of talented advisors and generals were also divided into two factions by the conflict – one supported Yuan Shang and the other supported Yuan Tan. Cao Cao seized the opportunity to launch an attack on Yuan Tan's base at Liyang. Though Cao Cao eventually withdrew, Yuan Tan came to resent Yuan Shang even more during course of the battle, which led to open warfare between the brothers. Yuan Tan eventually allied with Cao Cao against Yuan Shang, but Cao Cao accused him of violating some terms of the alliance and killed him in battle. On the other hand, Yuan Shang suffered defeats at the hands of Cao Cao and fled north to join his second brother Yuan Xi. Cao Cao's forces pursued them and defeated the Wuhuan tribe, the Yuan brothers' ally, in the Battle of White Wolf Mountain. Yuan Shang and Yuan Xi fled to Liaodong to seek shelter under the warlord Gongsun Kang in 207, but Gongsun killed them instead and sent their heads to Cao Cao. By then, most of northern China was unified under Cao Cao's control, and Cao Cao could begin to turn his attention to the south.

== Legacy and analysis ==
Throughout the ages, Cao Cao's impressive victory at Guandu, the climactic event of his life, has drawn analysis by both historical commentators and militarists hoping to imitate his success.

The Song dynasty historian Sima Guang, compiler of the chronicle Zizhi Tongjian, remarked that while Yuan Shao was generous, elegant and able, he was also obstinate, self-satisfied, and seldom heeded reasonable advice. These negative attributes were the cause of his defeat.

In more recent times, both the Chinese Nationalists and Communists have picked up on this battle and made their own interpretations, in various degrees of objectivity.

The Nationalists followed traditional Chinese historiography in that they judged the battle in terms of personalities, rather than the situations and the tactics involved. For example, Cao Cao was seen as capable, decisive, and far-sighted, while Yuan Shao was derided as mediocre, slow, arrogant, and unable to employ men properly.

The Communist leader Mao Zedong, in his writings about strategic retreat, used the Battle of Guandu along with the Battle of Chenggao, Battle of Kunyang, Battle of Red Cliffs, Battle of Xiaoting, and Battle of Fei River to illustrate the concept. In all of these battles, he wrote, "...the contestants were unequal in strength, and the weaker one yielding a step at first, pinned down the stronger one through delayed action and defeated him." Mao's words attracted some attention to the battle, and many papers were written to analyze the Battle of Guandu in Maoist terms. The Maoist interpretation, while taking note of Yuan Shao's serious errors of judgement, advocates that the strong enemy will make fateful errors, while the weaker opponent need only to await their appearance. The Marxist interpretation portrays Yuan Shao as the representative of the great landlord-official class, and Cao Cao as of the middle and small landlord class. The battle was thus a product of class conflict in which Yuan Shao's fall was inevitable.

The historian Carl Leban attributes Cao Cao's victory to one single strategic decision — the defender's choice of location. Leban asserts that Cao Cao chose Guandu as the place to make his stand because of his superior understanding of the relation between topography, logistics, and tactics over Yuan Shao. It was the issue about logistics that prompted Cao Cao to abandon the defence at the Yellow River. By luring Yuan Shao far south into Guandu, Cao Cao had forcibly extended Yuan Shao's supply lines and was thus able to pounce on his logistical disadvantage to gain a decisive victory.

The Australian sinologist Rafe de Crespigny is skeptical of the traditional viewpoint and questions Yuan Shao's supposed advantage over Cao Cao. De Crespigny argues that Yuan Shao's hold on his nominal territories were not as secure as Cao Cao, who had aggressively campaigned to stabilize his surroundings. Taking note that Yuan Shao took ten years to eliminate the isolated Gongsun Zan, de Crespigny suggests that it was not due to indecisiveness that Yuan Shao did not take advantage of Cao Cao's temporal weaknesses, but that Yuan Shao might not have had the men to spare for such ventures. From such a perspective, Yuan Shao, faced with the ever-growing threat of his former ally Cao Cao, concentrated his force in a direct approach to Cao Cao's headquarters in hope that such a strike would overwhelm his enemy. Though he was outwitted and defeated by Cao Cao, Yuan Shao's decisions might not have been so foolish as numerous traditional historians and commentators have said.
