= Chunyu Qiong =

Chinese general under warlord Yuan Shao (died 200)

- 淳于瓊

Right Colonel (右校尉)
- In office ? – 189
- Monarch: Emperor Ling of Han

Personal details
- Born: Unknown
- Died: 200
- Occupation: Military officer
- Courtesy name: Zhongjian (仲簡)

Chunyu Qiong (died 200), courtesy name Zhongjian, was a military officer serving under the warlord Yuan Shao during the late Eastern Han dynasty of China. He played a significant part in the Battle of Guandu in 200.

== Life ==
Little is known about Chunyu's background other than that in 188, he was the Right Colonel (右校尉) in the newly created Army of the Western Garden along with Yuan Shao and Cao Cao. He may have left the capital, Luoyang, at around the same time as Yuan Shao and joined the coalition against Dong Zhuo in 190. It is clear that by the end of the decade, Chunyu Qiong had become one of Yuan Shao's leading and most trusted military officers. In a later memorial submitted by Cao Cao, he is referred to as "a great officer under Yuan Shao".

In 195, Yuan Shao's strategist Ju Shou suggested that he welcome Emperor Xian to his province so that he could effectively be in control of the imperial government. However, Chunyu Qiong opposed this suggestion based on the faulty logic that if he did, he would have to yield to Emperor Xian on key decisions. Yuan Shao listened to Chunyu Qiong thus giving Cao Cao the opportunity.

In 200, Cao Cao had become Yuan Shao's main rival for domination of northern China. In the preparations for the clash, Chunyu Qiong sided with Guo Tu against Ju Shou, calling for a more aggressive strategy against Cao Cao. As a result, he was given command of a third of Yuan Shao's army along with Guo. In the spring of 200, he joined Guo Tu and Yan Liang in an attack on Boma, held by Cao Cao's general Liu Yan.

In the latter stages of the Battle of Guandu, Chunyu Qiong led more than 10,000 troops to guard Wuchao (烏巢), about 40 li north of Yuan Shao's main camp, to receive a new shipment of grain supplies. In early dawn, he was surprised by a raid led by Cao Cao himself. Yuan Shao's cavalry were routed, Wuchao was captured, and Chunyu Qiong was beheaded after the battle.

According to the Cao Man Zhuan, during the battle, his nose was cut off, and he was brought to Cao Cao, who asked him, "What do you have to say for yourself?" Chunyu Qiong replied: "Heaven decides the victor, what need have you to ask?" Impressed by the answer, Cao Cao wanted to spare his life, but Xu You urged Cao Cao to kill Chunyu Qiong, saying that Chunyu Qiong would take revenge later on him for cutting off his nose. Cao Cao then ordered Chunyu Qiong to be executed.

With the fall of Wuchao, Yuan Shao's positions collapsed and a number of his commanders, such as Gao Lan (高覽) and Zhang He, defected to Cao Cao. Chunyu Qiong's defeat at Wuchao has earned him a reputation in Chinese folklore as a commander derelict and without any real ability.

== In Romance of the Three Kingdoms ==
In the 14th-century historical novel Romance of the Three Kingdoms, Chunyu Qiong was described as a heavy drinker and often seen with a bottle of wine. During the Battle of Guandu, Yuan Shao left Chunyu Qiong as the overseer of the important supply depot in Wuchao. When Cao Cao, who listened to Xu You's advice, found the depot, Chunyu Qiong was drunk at the time and failed to put up any significant defence. This resulted in Cao Cao succeeding in burning down the supply depot. Afterwards, Cao Cao mutilated Chunyu Qiong's face and sent him back to Yuan Shao. The furious Yuan Shao ordered Chunyu Qiong's execution.

== See also ==
- Lists of people of the Three Kingdoms
