= Yan Liang =

Chinese military general (died 200)

Yan Liang 顔良
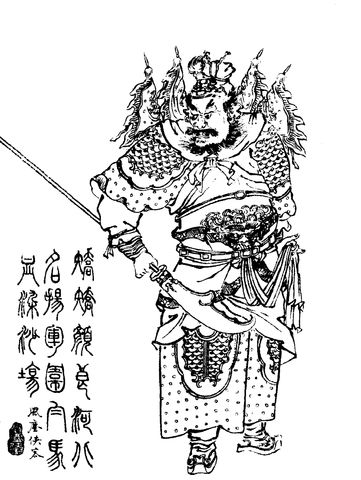
- A Qing dynasty illustration of Yan Liang
- Born: Unknown; Linyi, Shandong
- Died: 200; Boma (白馬; near present-day Hua County, Henan)
- Occupation: Military General

Yan Liang
- Traditional Chinese: 顔良
- Simplified Chinese: 颜良
Transcriptions
Standard Mandarin
- Hanyu Pinyin: Yán Liáng
- Wade–Giles: Yen Liang

Yan Liang (died 200) was a military general serving under the warlord Yuan Shao during the late Eastern Han dynasty of China. He was slain by Guan Yu at the Battle of Boma.

== Life ==
Little is known about Yan Liang's life. The only historical records about him could be found in the Records of the Three Kingdoms, in the biographies of Yuan Shao, Guan Yu, Xun Yu and Cao Cao. By the time he becomes focus of any attention in the records, he had made a name along with Wen Chou as a figure celebrated for his bravery.

In 200, the alliance between Cao Cao and Yuan Shao had turned to war with Yuan Shao led a major army against Cao Cao for the campaign of Guandu. Some in Cao Cao's camp where concerned about the war, the scholar and critic Kong Rong listing Yan Liang and Wen Chou's bravery as reasons to worry but Xun Yu dismissed it as bravery of a common sort that could easily be dealt with. As Yuan Shao's forces marched to Liyang, to ensure a safe crossing of the Yellow River, he intended to send forces across to the south bank to attack Boma (northeast of present-day Hua County, Henan), under Administrator of Dong Liu Yan, to set a foothold on the southern bank of the river. His adviser Ju Shou warned him that Yan Liang was valiant yet too narrow-minded to handle the responsibility alone while more senior commanders Guo Tu and Chunyu Qiong were sent, possibly to supervise Yan Liang's operation

Early in the summer, Cao Cao took Xun You's advice and moved his main force westwards along the Yellow River to Yan Crossing, diverting Yuan Shao's army in the same direction. Cao Cao led a light force to Boma in a forced march, catching Yan Liang by surprise. Yan Liang led his forces to meet Cao Cao over 10 li (over 4 km) from Boma and Cao Cao sent Zhang Liao and Guan Yu as vanguard to fight. During the ensuing battle, Guan Yu identified Yan Liang in the enemy ranks, rode into the midst of Yan Liang's army and killed him then fought his way back out. With Yan Liang dead, the army at Boma collapsed.

Cao Cao would withdraw from Boma, taking the resources off the area back to Guandu and would be pursued by the cavalry forces of Wen Chou and Liu Bei. The ambush and killing of Wen Chou in the resulting battle meant that in the first skirmishes, two of Yuan Shao's famed officers were killed and it was noted to have a demoralizing impact on the morale of Yuan's army.

== In Romance of the Three Kingdoms ==
In the 14th-century historical novel Romance of the Three Kingdoms, Yuan Shao praises Yan Liang's prowess in battle when he laments, as coalition forces see many champions killed by Hua Xiong, that "If I had either Yan Liang or Wen Chou here, I would have nothing to fear." When Yuan Shao confronts Sun Jian over taking the imperial seal, Yan Liang and Wen Chou are there. When Han Fu surrenders Ji to Yuan Shao, loyalists Geng Wu and Min Chun attempted to assassinate Yuan Shao before he can arrive but the plot was foiled with Yan Liang and Wen Chou killing the plotters in the aftermath. When Lü Bu sought Yuan Shao's support after failure to take Yan from Cao Cao, Yan Liang was sent with 50,000 men to attack Lu Bu who then fled to Xu.

The Hua Xiong comment (the novel does have Xun Yu's dismissive comment and Ju Shou's concerns) foreshadows Yan Liang's first appearance in Chapter 25, where Yuan Shao deploys him as the commander of a vanguard force of 100,000 to take Boma in a conflict with rival warlord Cao Cao. Cao Cao quickly leads 50,000 and come to Boma's defence. True to his lord's compliments, Yan Liang slays two of Cao Cao's recently acquired warriors from the victory over Lu Bu, Song Xian (宋憲) lasted three and Wei Xu (魏續) is killed in one bout, and defeats Xu Huang after twenty bounts, demoralizing Cao Cao's forces.

Following Cheng Yu's advice, Cao Cao then summoned Guan Yu to the frontline to deal with Yan Liang. The next day, as Yan Liang's troops lined up on the battlefield, Guan Yu sat beside Cao Cao on a hilltop to observe the enemy, Guan Yu was dismissive of what he saw and tells a surprised Cao Cao he can easily take Yan Liang's head. Riding Red Hare, Guan Yu charged right through the enemy ranks towards Yan Liang who was uncertain of who was approaching him, decapitates him in a swift stroke and returned to Cao Cao's camp in triumph with Yan Liang's head. Yan Liang's army collapsed and were slaughtered by Cao Cao's pursuing force. When news reached Yuan Shao, he nearly killed Liu Bei for what Guan Yu had done believing it to be a plot while Wen Chou sought command of the next army to avenge a man he saw as a brother.

Guan Yu's killings of Yan Liang and Wen Chou would be mentioned in the novel as others like Zhou Yu looked in awe of the slayer of such champions but after Guan Yu's death, his angry spirit is rebuked by a priest for the manner of the slaying of those two men and the guardian's of the five passes who he had slain when returning to Liu Bei from Cao Cao's service.

== See also ==
- Lists of people of the Three Kingdoms
- List of fictitious stories in Romance of the Three Kingdoms
