= Jizhou (ancient China) =

Historical province of China

- Chinese: 冀州
Transcriptions
Standard Mandarin
- Hanyu Pinyin: Jìzhōu

Ji Province, also known by its Chinese name Jizhou, was one of the Nine Provinces of ancient China. It is referenced in Chinese historical texts such as the Tribute of Yu, Erya and Rites of Zhou. It consisted of lands north of the Yellow River, including the modern province Hebei, and the municipalities of Beijing and Tianjin.

== History ==
=== Yu Gong account ===
The Yu Gong treatise in the Book of Documents contains an account of Jizhou province and Yu the Great's actions there. According to the account, Yu mainly focused on water control projects for the Hukou waterfall, the Taiyuan river (modern-day Fen River), the Wei River and the Liang, K'i, Heng and Chang rivers. The treatise also mentions the white clay soil of the region, its high tax revenues, its middle quality fields and the native inhabitants who wore skins.

=== Han dynasty ===
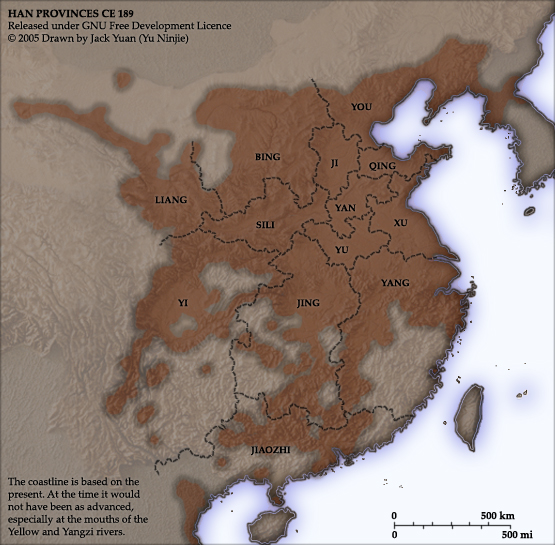
Map of Chinese provinces in the prelude of Three Kingdoms period. (In the late Eastern Han dynasty, 189 CE).

In the late Han dynasty, much of northern China, including Jizhou, was controlled by the warlord Yuan Shao and headquartered at Ye. In 200, Yuan Shao was defeated by the rival warlord Cao Cao at the Battle of Guandu, and died shortly thereafter. His sons Yuan Shang and Yuan Tan took control of his territories. In the following years, Cao Cao launched an invasion of northern China, capturing Ye in 204 and decisively winning the Battle of White Wolf Mountain in 207. Cao Cao and his successors controlled Jizhou for the rest of the Han dynasty and the Three Kingdoms period.
