= Battle of Red Cliffs order of battle =

The following is the order of battle for the Battle of Red Cliffs (208–209 AD).

== Cao Cao forces ==
- Imperial Chancellor (丞相) Cao Cao
- (Acting) General Who Attacks the South (征南將軍) Cao Ren
- Army Protector and Commandant (都督護軍) Zhao Yan, coordinated the units commanded by the following seven officers:
  - General of Tiger's Might (虎威將軍) Yu Jin
  - General Who Defeats Bandits (盪寇將軍) Zhang Liao
  - General Who Pacifies the Di (平狄將軍) Zhang He
  - General Who Defeats Barbarians (破虜將軍) Li Dian
  - Zhu Ling
  - Lu Zhao (路招)
  - Feng Kai (馮楷)
- General Who Sweeps Across the Wilderness (橫野將軍) Xu Huang
- General of Uplifting Martial Might (奮武將軍) Cheng Yu
- Palace Counsellor (太中大夫) Jia Xu
- Administrator of Runan (汝南太守) Man Chong

Total strength of combined land and naval forces: ≈800,000 (according to Cao Cao's claim); ≈220,000–240,000 (according to Zhou Yu's estimations)

== Sun Quan forces ==
- General Who Attacks Barbarians (討虜將軍) Sun Quan
- Central Army Protector (中護軍) Zhou Yu, served as the Left Chief Controller (左都督).
- General of the Household Who Defeats Bandits (盪寇中郎將) Cheng Pu, served as the Right Chief Controller (右都督).
- Colonel Who Praises the Army (贊軍校尉) Lu Su
- General of the Household Who Attacks Barbarians (征虜中郎將) Lü Fan
- General of the Household Who Sweeps Across the Wilderness (橫野中郎將) Lü Meng
- General of the Household (中郎將) Han Dang
- Commandant of Danyang (丹陽都尉) Huang Gai
- Commandant of Vehemence (承烈都尉) Ling Tong
- Chief of Yichun (宜春長) Zhou Tai
- Gan Ning

Total strength of combined land and naval forces: ≈30,000

== Liu Bei and Liu Qi forces ==
- General of the Left (左將軍) Liu Bei
- Lieutenant-General (偏將軍) Guan Yu
- General of the Household (中郎將) Zhang Fei
- Zhuge Liang
- Administrator of Jiangxia (江夏太守) Liu Qi

Total strength of combined land and naval forces: ≈20,000
