= Zhao Yan (Three Kingdoms) =

Chinese official and general (171–245)

- 趙儼

Minister of Works (司空)
- In office 9 April – July or August 245
- Monarch: Cao Fang
- Preceded by: Cui Lin
- Succeeded by: Gao Rou

General of Agile Cavalry (驃騎將軍)
- In office 243 – 9 August 245
- Monarch: Cao Fang
- Succeeded by: Liu Fang

General Who Attacks the West (征西將軍)
- In office ?–243
- Monarch: Cao Fang

General Who Attacks Shu (征蜀將軍)
- In office 239–?
- Monarch: Cao Fang

Minister of Finance (大司農)
- In office ?–239
- Monarch: Cao Rui

Military Adviser to the Grand Marshal (大司馬軍師)
- In office ?–?
- Monarch: Cao Rui

Master of Writing (尚書)
- In office ?–?
- Monarch: Cao Rui
- In office 223
- Monarch: Cao Pi

Military Adviser to the General Who Attacks the East (征東軍師)
- In office 223–226
- Monarch: Cao Pi

General of the Household for Fiscal Revenue (度支中郎將)
- In office 223
- Monarch: Cao Pi

General of the Household for Agriculture (典農中郎將)
- In office ?–222
- Monarch: Cao Pi

Administrator of Hedong (河東太守)
- In office ?–?
- Monarch: Cao Pi
- Preceded by: Du Ji

Chief Commandant of Escorting Cavalry (駙馬都尉)
- In office ?–?
- Monarch: Cao Pi

Palace Attendant
- In office 220–?
- Monarch: Cao Pi

Consultant (議郎)
- In office 219–220
- Monarch: Emperor Xian of Han
- Chancellor: Cao Cao

Army Protector of Guanzhong (關中護軍)
- In office ?–219
- Monarch: Emperor Xian of Han
- Chancellor: Cao Cao

Administrator of Fufeng (扶風太守)
- In office 211–?
- Monarch: Emperor Xian of Han
- Chancellor: Cao Cao

Personal details
- Born: 171 (Note: In 197, Zhao Yan was 27 years old by East Asian age reckoning. By calculation, his year of birth should be around 171.) Yuzhou, Henan
- Died: July or August 245 (aged 74) (Note: Cao Fang's biography in the Sanguozhi recorded that Zhao Yan died in the 6th month of the 6th year in the Zhengshi era of Cao Fang's reign. This month corresponds to 12 July to 9 August 245 in the Gregorian calendar.)
- Children: Zhao Ting
- Occupation: Official, general
- Courtesy name: Boran (伯然)
- Posthumous name: Marquis Mu (穆侯)
- Peerage: Marquis of a Chief District (都鄉侯)

Zhao Yan (171 – July or August 245), courtesy name Boran, was a government official and military general of the state of Cao Wei during the Three Kingdoms period of China. He previously served under the warlord Cao Cao during the late Eastern Han dynasty.

== Early life ==
Zhao Yan was from Yangzhai County (陽翟縣), Yingchuan Commandery (潁川郡), which is present-day Yuzhou, Henan. When chaos broke out in central China towards the end of the Eastern Han dynasty, Zhao Yan fled south to Jing Province (covering present-day Hubei and Hunan), where he met Du Xi and Po Qin (繁欽). (Note: In vol.21 of his annotations of Sanguozhi, Pei Songzhi wrote that Qin's surname should be pronounced as "pó". (繁，音婆。)) The three of them became close friends, pooled their wealth together, and helped each other out financially.

Zhao Yan shared equal fame as Xin Pi, Chen Qun and Du Xi, who like him were also from Yingchuan Commandery. They were collectively referred to as "Xin, Chen, Du and Zhao".

== Service under Cao Cao ==
In 196, the warlord Cao Cao received Emperor Xian, who was previously held hostage by other warlords, and brought him to his base in Xu (許; present-day Xuchang, Henan), which became the new Han imperial capital. The figurehead emperor and the Han central government thus came under Cao Cao's control. When Zhao Yan heard about it, he told Po Qin: "Cao Cao's actions are in line with the will of Heaven and the people. He will definitely be able to restore order and peace to Huaxia. I have found my calling." In the following year, a 26-year-old Zhao Yan brought along his fellow townsfolk to Xu to join Cao Cao. Cao Cao appointed him as the Chief (長) of Langling County (朗陵縣; southwest of present-day Queshan County, Henan), the capital of Yang'an Commandery (陽安郡).

=== As the Chief of Langling County ===
After Zhao Yan assumed office, he saw that Langling County had a high crime rate and that criminals behaved lawlessly because of poor law enforcement. He then started a crackdown on crime by arresting several high-profile criminals, putting them on trial, and sentencing them to death accordingly. While the criminals were put on death row, Zhao Yan wrote to his superior to seek clemency on their behalf. After his superior approved, Zhao Yan pardoned and released the criminals. In doing so, he successfully tempered justice with mercy.

When an uncle of the wife of Li Tong, the Commandant of Yang'an Commandery, committed an offence in Langling County, Zhao Yan arrested him, found him guilty and sentenced him to death. At the time, as Li Tong's appointment was higher than Zhao Yan's, he had the authority to overturn Zhao Yan's decision and spare his wife's uncle. Li Tong's wife knew that, so she tearfully pleaded with her husband to intervene and save her uncle. Li Tong, however, refused to intervene because he saw that as an abuse of power, so his wife's uncle lost his head. Instead of holding a grudge against Zhao Yan over this incident, Li Tong respected him for his righteousness and became close friends with him.

=== Suggesting a tax exemption ===
Around the year 200, when the Battle of Guandu broke out between Cao Cao and his rival Yuan Shao, Yuan Shao sent spies to infiltrate the various commanderies in Yu Province, then under Cao Cao's control, and induce their peoples to turn against Cao Cao and defect to his side. Most of the commanderies agreed to support Yuan Shao; only Yang'an Commandery (陽安郡) refused.

When Li Tong, the Commandant of Yang'an Commandery, pushed the locals to pay their due taxes, Zhao Yan warned him that doing so would only fuel the people's resentment and make them more likely to defect to Yuan Shao. Li Tong then explained his concern: "Yuan Shao and [Cao Cao] are currently locked in a stalemate, and many commanderies and counties have defected to the enemy side. If we fail to deliver tax revenue to the imperial court, I am afraid they will think that we are trying to sit on the fence and waiting to join whichever side that wins the war." Zhao Yan replied: "Your analysis of the situation is spot on. However, I think we should carefully weigh the costs and benefits while refraining from collecting taxes for the time being. I am willing to help you solve this problem."

Zhao Yan then wrote to Xun Yu, the official in charge of Xu (許; present-day Xuchang, Henan), the imperial capital, while Cao Cao was away at the frontline. He wrote: "The people of Yang'an Commandery ought to pay their due taxes to the government. However, it is too risky to deliver tax revenue to the imperial capital at the moment because bandits and enemy forces might rob the convoy along the way. Our people are poor. Many neighbouring commanderies and counties have defected to the enemy. The situation is very unstable now. This is a critical moment. The people of Yang'an Commandery have thus far remained loyal despite being in such a dangerous situation. By giving out small rewards to those who remain loyal, you can motivate them to maintain their loyalty under difficult circumstances. Rewarding goodness is a form of motivation to the righteous; those who excel in the art of governance know that it is best to let the people keep their wealth. I think that the imperial court can exempt (Yang'an Commandery) from taxes this time, as a gesture of kindness and to reward the people for their loyalty." Xun Yu replied: "I will report this to Lord Cao and issue an official notice to Yang'an Commandery to return the collected tax revenue to the people." Zhao Yan's suggestion proved effective as the people were so happy with the tax exemption that they remained loyal to Cao Cao.

Zhao Yan was subsequently summoned to Xu to serve as a Registrar (主簿) under Cao Cao, who then held the position of Minister of Works (司空) in the Han central government.

The Weilue recorded that Li Tong considered defecting to Yuan Shao's side during the Battle of Guandu, just like many other officials under Cao Cao. However, Zhao Yan managed to persuade him to remain loyal to Cao Cao. After the Battle of Guandu, Cao Cao's forces broke into Yuan Shao's office and found several documents detailing exchanges between Yuan Shao and spies/defectors from Cao Cao's side. When Cao Cao looked through the documents, he saw that Li Tong was not among those who had secret contact with Yuan Shao, and deduced that Zhao Yan must have stopped Li Tong. He then remarked, "This must be Zhao Boran's doing." The historian Pei Songzhi noted that the Weilue account contradicted Cao Cao's biography in the Sanguozhi, which recorded that Cao Cao did not look through the documents and immediately ordered them to be burnt. He believed that the Sanguozhi account was the correct one.

=== As a military coordinator ===
In the 200s, three of Cao Cao's top officers – Yu Jin, Yue Jin and Zhang Liao – were respectively stationed at Yingyin (潁陰; in present-day Xuchang, Henan), Yangzhai (陽翟; present-day Yuzhou, Henan) and Changshe (長社; east of present-day Changge, Henan) counties. As all three of them were headstrong and strong-willed, they had difficulties working with each other. Cao Cao thus appointed Zhao Yan as an army adviser to assist the three of them in managing their relations with each other and persuade them to cooperate. Over time, due to Zhao Yan's efforts, the three officers got along better with each other.

In 208, when Cao Cao led a military campaign to conquer Jing Province (covering present-day Hubei and Hunan), he appointed Zhao Yan as the acting Administrator (太守) of Zhangling Commandery (章陵郡; around present-day Zaoyang, Hubei). Later, just before the Battle of Red Cliffs, he reassigned Zhao Yan to serve as Army Protector and Commandant (都督護軍), whose role was to coordinate the movements of the units commanded by the following seven officers: Yu Jin, Zhang Liao, Zhang He, Zhu Ling, Li Dian, Lu Zhao (路招) and Feng Kai (馮楷).

=== Military service in Guanzhong ===
In 211, following his victory over a coalition of northwestern warlords at the Battle of Tong Pass, Cao Cao appointed Zhao Yan as his Registrar (主簿) again, but promoted him to be the Administrator of Fufeng Commandery (扶風郡; around present-day Xingping, Shaanxi) shortly after. He also reorganised about 5,000 troops who used to serve under the northwestern warlords and put them under the command of Yin Shu (殷署), one of his generals. He then appointed Zhao Yan as the Army Protector of Guanzhong (關中護軍) to supervise the various military units stationed in the Guanzhong region.

When some Qiang and other non-Han Chinese tribes caused trouble in the Guanzhong region, Zhao Yan and Yin Shu led their troops to attack the tribes and defeated them at Xinping Commandery (新平郡; around present-day Bin County, Shaanxi). Later, a peasant Lü Bing (呂並) declared himself a general, gathered some followers, and started a rebellion in Chencang (陳倉; east of present-day Baoji, Shaanxi). Zhao Yan and Yin Shu then led their troops to attack the rebels and succeeded in quelling the rebellion.

=== Suppressing a mutiny ===
Around the time, Yin Shu received orders to draft 1,200 men from the Guanzhong region into military service, and send them to Hanzhong Commandery. When the newly recruited soldiers bid farewell to their families in Guanzhong, Zhao Yan noticed that many of them looked upset and distraught. On the day Yin Shu left with the 1,200 recruits, Zhao Yan was worried that something bad would happen so he brought along 150 men and followed Yin Shu and the 1,200 recruits to the Xie Valley (斜谷), where he comforted the recruits and warned Yin Shu to take precautions. After that, he and his 150 men turned back and stayed overnight at the residence of Zhang Ji, the Inspector of Yong Province (covering parts of present-day Shaanxi and Gansu).

In the meantime, after Yin Shu and the 1,200 recruits had travelled about 40 li, some of the recruits started a mutiny because they were unwilling to leave their families behind in Guanzhong and go to Hanzhong. Yin Shu went missing during the chaos. Among the 150 men whom Zhao Yan had brought along, they were either old friends or relatives of the 1,200 recruits. When Zhao Yan's 150 men received news of the mutiny, they became very restless and started readying themselves for a fight.

Zhao Yan wanted to go to Xie Valley alone to end the mutiny, but Zhang Ji stopped him and said, "The soldiers in our own camp are already so disturbed. It won't be of any help if you try to end this mutiny on your own. Why don't we find out more about the situation before taking action?" Zhao Yan replied: "I suspect that some men from our camp are involved in the mutiny as well. When they hear that a mutiny had broken out (in Yin Shu's camp), they try to start a mutiny here too. However, there are also some men from our camp who are reluctant to participate in the mutiny. We should try our best to contain the situation and end the mutiny before it goes out of control. Besides, it is my duty as a commander to maintain order and discipline. If I fail to end this mutiny and end up losing my life, then so be it."

Zhao Yan then headed towards the Xie Valley with only a few men accompanying him. After they travelled 30 li, Zhao Yan called for a break, gathered his men, delivered a speech, and sincerely reassured them that everything would be fine. His men, moved by his speech, promised to remain loyal and stand by him. When Zhao Yan reached the site of the mutiny, he ordered the officers to carry out a headcount and gather back as many of the recruits who deserted as possible. After gathering back more than 800 recruits, Zhao Yan assembled them in an open area, where he executed the chief instigator(s) the mutiny and granted amnesty to the remaining recruits. When the local officials heard about it, they released the deserters they arrested and sent them back to Zhao Yan.

Zhao Yan then secretly asked the Han central government to send a senior officer to take command, and send veteran soldiers to guard the volatile Guanzhong region. Cao Cao approved his request and ordered a general Liu Zhu (劉柱) to lead 2,000 veteran troops to Guanzhong to replace the newly recruited soldiers currently under Zhao Yan's command. The recruits became panicky when they heard that they were going to be replaced.

Zhao Yan assembled all the officers and told them: "We have too few veteran soldiers here. Our reinforcements from the east have yet to arrive. Many of our soldiers are already planning to start a mutiny. If a mutiny breaks out, the consequences would be disastrous. We should take action while they are still hesitating, and quickly put an end to this crisis." He then publicly announced that he would choose 1,000 of the most loyal and dutiful men from among the newly recruited soldiers and allow them to remain in Guanzhong, while the rest would still be sent to more secure territory in the east. He also ordered his staff to carry out a background check of all the newly recruited soldiers and select the 1,000 men. The 1,000 chosen soldiers felt more at ease and willingly complied with Zhao Yan's orders. The others did not dare to cause trouble and resigned to their fates; Zhao Yan gathered all of them and had them escorted to the east on the following day. As for the 1,000 recruits who were granted permission to remain in Guanzhong, Zhao Yan did not put all of them in the same unit and instead scattered them across different units.

About 10 days later, when Liu Zhu and the 2,000 veteran troops reached Guanzhong, Zhao Yan forced the 1,000 recruits to go to the east along with soldiers from other units. They numbered more than 20,000 in total.

The historian Sun Sheng criticised Zhao Yan for lying to the 1,000 recruits, saying that he had betrayed their trust in him when he sent them away despite having promised them that he would allow them to remain in Guanzhong.

=== Battle of Fancheng ===
In 219, when Cao Cao's general Cao Ren was besieged by Liu Bei's general Guan Yu at Fancheng (樊城; present-day Fancheng District, Xiangyang, Hubei) in northern Jing Province, Cao Cao appointed Zhao Yan as a Consultant (議郎) and ordered him to join another general Xu Huang in leading reinforcements to Fancheng to help Cao Ren.

When they reached Fancheng, they saw that Cao Ren was stuck in a perilous situation as Guan Yu's troops had completely surrounded the fortress. To make matters worse, reinforcements led by Cao Cao's other officers had not arrived yet, and Xu Huang did not have enough troops to attack Guan Yu and lift the siege on Fancheng. Xu Huang's subordinates were also pressuring their superior to take action. At this point in time, Zhao Yan told Xu Huang and all the other officers: "The enemy has surrounded Fancheng so heavily that even water cannot seep through. We have too few troops. Cao Ren has also been cut off from contact with us, so he can't act in tandem with us. It won't be of any help if we try to lift the siege now. Why don't we send our vanguard force closer to the enemy encirclement, and at the same time try to contact Cao Ren and let him know that reinforcements are on their way so as to raise their morale? I believe the remaining reinforcements will be here within ten days and that Cao Ren should be able to hold out long enough. When they show up, we will then attack the enemy from outside while Cao Ren attacks from inside, and we can definitely defeat them. I am willing to take full responsibility if the remaining reinforcements don't show up in time."

All of them agreed with Zhao Yan's view. Xu Huang thus ordered his troops to dig trenches, and tie notices to arrows and fire them into the fortress to let Cao Ren and his men know that reinforcements had arrived. When the remaining reinforcements showed up, they combined forces with Xu Huang's army and Cao Ren's defenders to launch an attack on Guan Yu and succeeded in lifting the siege on Fancheng.

Although Guan Yu retreated after his defeat, his ships were still blocking the Mian River (沔水) and preventing Cao Cao's forces in Fancheng from making contact with Cao Cao's other forces in Xiangyang. During this time, Liu Bei's ally Sun Quan broke their alliance and used the opportunity to launch a stealth invasion of Guan Yu's base. When Guan Yu learnt that his base was lost, he immediately turned around and retreated to southern Jing Province.

Cao Ren assembled all the officers and discussed with them his plan to take advantage of the situation to launch a counterattack on Guan Yu and capture him alive if possible. Zhao Yan, however, disapproved and said: "When Sun Quan saw that Guan Yu was occupied with the siege at Fancheng, he wanted to secretly invade and capture Guan Yu's base but he was worried that Guan Yu would turn back to save his base. He was also worried that we would take advantage of their conflict to attack him. That was why he agreed to cooperate with us and pledge allegiance (to Cao Cao). However, he was actually sitting on the fence and waiting to see what happens before making his final decision. Now that Guan Yu and his remaining troops have become an isolated force, all the more we should leave him alive so that he will pose a threat to Sun Quan. If we attack Guan Yu, Sun Quan will become worried that we will attack him after defeating Guan Yu, and will thus turn hostile towards us. I believe the King of Wei (Cao Cao) shares the same deep thoughts about the current situation as me."

Cao Ren agreed with Zhao Yan's view and aborted his plan to attack Guan Yu. Just as Zhao Yan explained, Cao Cao was indeed worried that Cao Ren and the others would launch a counterattack on Guan Yu, so he had sent a messenger to relay his order to Cao Ren to refrain from pursuing and attacking the retreating Guan Yu.

== Service under Cao Pi ==
Following Cao Cao's death in March 220, his son Cao Pi succeeded him as the vassal King of Wei (魏王) and appointed Zhao Yan as Palace Attendant. Later that year, Cao Pi usurped the throne from the figurehead Emperor Xian, ended the Eastern Han dynasty, and established the state of Cao Wei (or Wei) with himself as the new emperor. From the time between Cao Cao's death to the year 222 (the third year of Cao Pi's reign), Zhao Yan consecutively held the following positions: Chief Commandant of Escorting Cavalry (駙馬都尉), Administrator (太守) of Hedong Commandery (河東郡; around present-day Yuncheng, Shanxi), and General of the Household for Agriculture (典農中郎將).

The Weilue recorded that when Du Ji was serving as the Administrator of Hedong Commandery before Zhao Yan replaced him, the Wei government issued an order to all commandery administrators to gather all the widows in their respective jurisdictions and send them to places where the female population was low, so as to allow the widows to remarry and hence promote population growth. Some corrupt commandery administrators cheated by forcefully separating women from their husbands, falsely registering them as widows, and sending them away. As Du Ji went by the book, the records indicated that Hedong Commandery sent a very low number of widows. Later, after Zhao Yan replaced Du Ji as the Administrator of Hedong Commandery, the records showed a significant increase in the number of widows sent from the commandery. When Cao Pi asked Du Ji to explain the difference, the latter replied, "The women I sent were the wives of dead men. The women Zhao Yan sent are the wives of living men." Cao Pi and his other subjects were taken aback by Du Ji's response.

In 222, Cao Pi enfeoffed Zhao Yan as a Secondary Marquis (關內侯). Later that year, during the Battle of Dongkou between Wei and Eastern Wu (the state founded by Sun Quan), Cao Pi ordered Cao Xiu, who then held the appointment of Senior General Who Attacks the East (征東大將軍), to lead the Wei armies to resist the Wu forces. Zhao Yan served as a military adviser (軍師) to Cao Xiu during the battle. After the battle, Cao Pi elevated Zhao Yan from the status of a secondary marquis to a village marquis under the title "Marquis of Yitu Village" (宜土亭侯), and reassigned him to be General of the Household for Fiscal Revenue (度支中郎將). Zhao Yan was promoted to the position of a Master of Writing (尚書) in the imperial secretariat shortly after.

In 224 or 225, when there were military confrontations at Guangling between Wei and Wu forces, Zhao Yan served as a military adviser to Cao Xiu again.

== Service under Cao Rui ==
In 226, Cao Rui became the second emperor of Wei following the death of his father, Cao Pi. After his coronation, Cao Rui elevated Zhao Yan from the status of a village marquis to a Marquis of a Chief District (都鄉侯) with a marquisate of 600 taxable households. He also put Zhao Yan in charge of supervising military affairs in Jing Province and granted him acting imperial authority.

Some time later, Zhao Yan had to resign from his supervisory role in Jing Province later due to illness. He was then reassigned to be a Master of Writing (尚書) in the imperial secretariat again. Later, when he got better, he was put in charge of supervising military affairs in Yu Province and appointed as Military Adviser to the Grand Marshal (大司馬軍師). He was subsequently promoted to Minister of Finance (大司農).

== Service under Cao Fang ==
When Cao Fang came to the throne in 239 following Cao Rui's death, Zhao Yan was reassigned to supervise military affairs in Yong and Liang provinces, granted acting imperial authority, and appointed as General Who Attacks Shu (征蜀將軍). Later, he was promoted to General Who Attacks the West (征西將軍) and put in command of all the Wei armies in the two provinces.

In 243, due to old age and poor health, Zhao Yan requested to resign from his post in Yong and Liang provinces, and was recalled to the imperial capital, Luoyang, to serve as General of Agile Cavalry (驃騎將軍). At the time, each of the four generals who held the position of General Who Attacks the north–south/East/West had his own personal household staff. The generals would usually bring along their personal household staff when they were reassigned elsewhere; Zhao Yan, however, left them behind when he left for Luoyang. When he reached Bashang (霸上; the White Deer Plain located southeast of present-day Xi'an, Shaanxi), he realised he had forgotten to bring along his medication. His escorts immediately rushed back to Yong Province, retrieved several boxes of medicine from his former residence, and brought them to Bashang for him. Zhao Yan laughingly remarked, "People always say 'easier said than done'. I only casually asked about my medication. Is there really a need for you to do this?" He refused to take his medication and continued on his journey to Luoyang.

On 9 April 245, (Note: Cao Fang's biography in the Sanguozhi recorded that Zhao Yan was appointed as Minister of Works on the bingzi day of the 2nd month of the 6th year in the Zhengshi era of Cao Fang's reign. This date corresponds to 9 April 245 in the Gregorian calendar.) Zhao Yan was reassigned to be Minister of Works (司空). He died sometime between 12 July and 9 August of that year. The Wei government honoured him with the posthumous title "Marquis Mu" (穆侯). Zhao Yan's son, Zhao Ting (趙亭), inherited his father's peerage as a Marquis of a Chief District.

== See also ==
- Lists of people of the Three Kingdoms
