= Battle of Ba =

Battle between warlords Liu Bei and Cao Cao (215-216)

Date	December 215 – April 216
Location	Ba (near present-day Hanzhong, Shaanxi), China 33°10′22″N 106°40′14″E
Result	Liu Bei victory; Ba region is pacified

Belligerents
Liu Bei	Cao Cao

Commanders and leaders
Zhang Fei; Huang Quan	Zhang He; Pu Hu; Ren/Yuan Yue (Note: Recorded as Ren Yue (任約) by Sima Guang and Yuan Yue (袁約) by Chang Qu.); Du Huo

Strength
At least 10 000 elite soldiers under Zhang Fei; Unknown number of troops under Huang Quan	Main army of Cao Cao in that region

Casualties and losses
Unknown	Unknown
- Location within China

Battle of Ba
- Traditional Chinese: 巴之戰
- Simplified Chinese: 巴之战
Transcriptions
Standard Mandarin
- Hanyu Pinyin: Bā Zhī Zhàn

The Battle of Ba was fought between the warlords Liu Bei and Cao Cao between December 215 and April 216 during the prelude to the Three Kingdoms period. Following his victory over Zhang Lu at Yangping, Cao Cao appointed Pu Hu (朴胡), Ren Yue (任約) and Du Huo (杜濩) as Administrator of the three Ba commanderies but they were defeated by Huang Quan. Zhang He would later try to relocate citizens from Ba to Hanzhong but was also defeated by Zhang Fei.

== Background ==
In July 215, Sun Quan sent envoys to Liu Bei asking him for the return of his territory in Jing Province. Liu Bei replied: "I will conquer Liang Province. Once, I have settled Liang then we may share Jing Province." Sun Quan was furious and he sent Lü Meng to retake southern Jing Province via a surprise attack. After Lü Meng and his colleagues captured the commanderies of Changsha, Lingling, and Guiyang. Liu Bei returned to Gong'an County and ordered Guan Yu to lead troops to stop Lü Meng and take back the three commanderies.

Around this time, Cao Cao led his army into Hanzhong and Zhang Lu fled to Bazhong. Huang Quan advised Liu Bei and told him: "If Hanzhong is lost then the three Ba commanderies will be in danger. This would be like severing the arms and thighs of the people of Shu." Therefore Liu Bei agreed to peace with Sun Quan, and they divided the territories in southern Jing Province between their respective domains along the Xiang River: Liu Bei would keep Nan, Lingling and Wuling commanderies in the west, while Sun Quan would take Changsha, Jiangxia and Guiyang commanderies in the east.

== Battle ==
In December 215, Liu Bei appointed Huang Quan as Army Protector (護軍) and sent him to welcome Zhang Lu. However, Zhang Lu had already surrendered to Cao Cao. Still, Cao Cao tried to maintain a military presence in the region as he previously appointed the tribal kings Pu Hu (朴胡), Ren Yue (任約) and Du Huo (杜濩) as Administrator of Ba Commandery (巴郡太守), Badong (巴東; "East Ba") and Baxi (巴西; "West Ba") along with marquis titles. However, Huang Quan defeated and forced them to abandon the Ba region.

In January 216, Cao Cao left Nanzheng and headed back to Ye (present-day Handan, Hebei), leaving behind General Who Attacks the West (征西將軍) Xiahou Yuan, Inspector of Yi Province (益州刺史) Zhao Yong and Zhang He to guard Hanzhong. Zhang He would often raid the area. Therefore Liu Bei alongside Zhang Fei and others led troops to oppose him.

In late January or early February 216, as Zhang He led several battalions from the main army separately south to Baxi, intending to evacuate and relocate civilians to Hanzhong. He advanced to Dangqu (宕渠), Mengtou (蒙頭) and Dangshi (盪石) counties until he opposed Zhang Fei's army for approximately 50 days. Zhang Fei directed more than 10,000 soldiers through an alternate route to intercept and ambush Zhang He from another direction at Yangshi. Zhang He's army was divided and its divisions were unable to support each other because of difficulty traversing the mountain paths, and Zhang Fei subsequently greatly defeated Zhang He. Zhang He lost his horse and slipped into the hills. But, he managed to arrive at Nanzheng with more than ten of his personal guards via another road.

== Aftermath ==
With Ba region secure, Liu Bei returned to Chengdu in April 216. On the advice of Fa Zheng and Huang Quan, Liu Bei would launch the Hanzhong Campaign from Ba region in December 217.
