= Maozhou =

Maozhou may refer to:

- Maozhou, Hebei (鄚州), a town in Renqiu, Hebei, China
- Maozhou (in modern Sichuan) (茂州), a prefecture between the 7th and 20th centuries in modern Sichuan, China
