= Shi Huan =

Chinese official serving the warlord Cao Cao (died 209)

- 史渙

Internal Director of the Army
- In office ? – 209

Acting Internal Army Colonel
- In office 190 – ?

Personal details
- Born: Unknown; Pei Commandery
- Died: 209
- Occupation: Military officer
- Courtesy name: Gongliu (公劉)

Shi Huan (died 209), courtesy name Gongliu, gained a reputation for valour and loyalty comparable to Han Hao. Shi Huan served the Eastern Han dynasty warlord Cao Cao from early on and was a trusted figure who helped supervise officials.

== Life ==
Shi Huan was from Pei Commandery and as a youth, he acted as a xia (俠), gathering followers without official authority and often acting outside the law. Shi Huan gained a reputation for having a heroic spirit. When Cao Cao raised forces to face Dong Zhuo in 190, Shi Huan led his retainers to join Cao Cao as Acting Internal Army Colonel and became a trusted aide, helping supervise the officers on campaign. In 198, the warlord Zhang Yang was assassinated and in the turmoil, the former Heishan bandit Sui Gu gained control in Henei and sought an alliance with Yuan Shao. Seeking to prevent the alliance and secure his left flank, Cao Cao sent an army led by Shi Huan, Cao Ren and Yu Jin across the He river to intercept Sui Gu's march north. The forces met in a battle at Quancheng with Sui Gu killed and his forces brought under control.

During the Battle of Guandu, Shi Huan was sent with Xu Huang to raid Yuan Shao's supplies at Gushi, defeating the defenders and setting the supplies ablaze. Shi Huan was given a trusted police role within the army and in 207 there was a debate among Cao Cao's officers about whether to undertake a risky march to attack Liucheng to defeat the Yuan remnants and the Wuhuan. Shi Huan feared the route was too long and dangerous so sought to gather support but he was unable to persuade Han Hao. The plan went ahead and Cao Cao was victorious at the Battle of White Wolf Mountain but after a difficult march back, Cao Cao rewarded those who had objected.

Shi Huan died in 209 with his son Shi Jing inheriting his estate.

== Romance of Three Kingdoms ==
An officer under Xu Huang, Shi Huan captures and interrogates a spy who tells Xu Huang about the supplies at Gushi. Shi Huan then sets the supplies on fire. In the Battle of Cangting Shi Huan has a duel with Yuan Shang but when Yuan Shang fakes a retreat, Shi Huan is lured to follow him and is then fatally shot in the eye by Yuan Shang. Yuan Shao then orders his troops to attack.

== See also ==
- Lists of people of the Three Kingdoms
