= Battle of Yangping =

Battle between warlords Cao Cao and Zhang Lu (215-216)

- Part of the wars at the end of the Han dynasty
Date	c. April 215 – January 216
Location	Hanzhong, China
Result	Cao Cao victory

Belligerents
Cao Cao	Zhang Lu

Commanders and leaders
Cao Cao	Zhang Lu (surrendered)

Battle of Yangping
- Traditional Chinese: 陽平之戰
- Simplified Chinese: 阳平之战
Transcriptions
Standard Mandarin
- Hanyu Pinyin: Yángpíng zhī zhàn

Battle of Yangping Pass
- Traditional Chinese: 陽平關之戰
- Simplified Chinese: 阳平关之战
Transcriptions
Standard Mandarin
- Hanyu Pinyin: Yángpíngguān zhī zhàn

The Battle of Yangping, also known as the Battle of Yangping Pass, was fought between the warlords Cao Cao and Zhang Lu from roughly April 215 to January 216 during the late Eastern Han dynasty of China. The battle concluded with a victory for Cao Cao.

== Background ==
Sometime between 17 April and 15 May 215, Cao Cao launched a campaign against Zhang Lu in Hanzhong Commandery. When Cao Cao's army arrived at Chencang (陳倉; present-day Chencang District, Baoji, Shaanxi) and was about to pass through Wudu (武都; around present-day Longnan, Gansu), the Di tribes in the area blocked their path, so Cao Cao sent Zhang He, Zhu Ling and others to attack the Di and clear the way. Between 16 May and 14 June 215, Cao Cao's army passed through San Pass (散關) and arrived at Hechi (河池). The Di king, Dou Mao (竇茂), led thousands of tribesmen to resist Cao Cao, but Cao defeated them by the following month and he massacred the Di population. Qu Yan (麴演), Jiang Shi (蔣石) and other generals from Xiping (西平) and Jincheng (金城) commanderies killed Han Sui and sent his head to Cao Cao.

Between 13 August and 10 September 215, Cao Cao's forces reached Yangping Pass (陽平關; in present-day Ningqiang County, Shaanxi) after making a long and arduous journey through mountainous terrain. When his soldiers started complaining, Cao Cao announced that he would remember them for their contributions to encourage them to move on.

== Battle ==
Zhang Lu ordered his younger brother Zhang Wei (張衛) and officer Yang Ang (楊昂) to lead troops to defend the pass. Zhang Wei and Yang Ang had defensive structures built in the mountainous areas, spanning over 10 li, to deter Cao Cao's advances. Cao Cao was unable to overcome the enemy after launching assaults so he withdrew his forces. Zhang Lu's men lowered their defences when they saw Cao Cao retreating. Cao Cao gave secret orders to Xie Biao (解𢢼) and Gao Zuo (高祚) to lead a sneak attack on the enemy at night and they achieved success. Yang Ang was killed in action while Zhang Wei fled under the cover of night.

== Aftermath ==
Zhang Lu retreated to Bazhong (巴中; in present-day eastern Sichuan) when he heard that Yangping Pass had been taken. Cao Cao's army occupied Nanzheng (南鄭; present-day Nanzheng County, Shaanxi), the capital of Hanzhong Commandery, and seized the precious items stored in Zhang Lu's treasuries.

The people in Hanzhong surrendered to Cao Cao, who then renamed the place to "Hanzhong" from its previous name "Hanning" (漢寧). (Note: Hanzhong Commandery (漢中郡; around present-day Hanzhong, Shaanxi) had been called "Hanzhong" since the Warring States period. It was renamed to "Hanning Commandery" (漢寧郡) in the late Eastern Han dynasty, but Cao Cao restored its old name "Hanzhong" in 215 after seizing control of the commandery from Zhang Lu.) Cao Cao separated Anyang (安陽) and Xicheng (西城) counties from Hanzhong and placed them under the jurisdiction of Xicheng Commandery (西城郡) and appointed an Administrator (太守) to oversee the commandery. He also partitioned Xi (錫) and Shangyong (上庸) commanderies and appointed Commandants (都尉) to govern those areas.

Between 11 October and 8 November 215, the tribal kings Pu Hu (朴胡), Ren Yue (任約) and Du Huo (杜濩), the Marquis of Congyi (賨邑侯), led the people in Bayi (巴夷) and Cong (賨) to submit to Cao Cao. Cao Cao split Ba Commandery (巴郡) into Badong (巴東; "East Ba") and Baxi (巴西; "West Ba") commanderies and appointed Pu Hu and Du Huo as their Administrators respectively. Ren Yue was appointed as the Administrator of Ba Commandery (巴郡太守). All of them also received marquis titles. In October, Emperor Xian also granted Cao Cao the authority to confer titles upon the nobles and officials in the area. Many of the surrendered tribes moved north to Lüeyang Commandery (略陽郡; in modern Tianshui, Gansu), where they mingled with the local Di tribes and became known as the Ba Di (巴氐).

Between 9 December 215 and 6 January 216, Zhang Lu led his followers out of Bazhong and came to surrender to Cao Cao. Cao Cao accepted their surrender and granted marquis titles to Zhang Lu and his five sons. Around the time, Liu Bei had recently seized control of Yi Province (covering present-day Sichuan and Chongqing) from its governor Liu Zhang and occupied Bazhong after Zhang Lu left. Cao Cao ordered Zhang He to lead a force to attack Liu Bei, but Zhang He was defeated by Liu's general Zhang Fei at the Battle of Baxi.

Between 7 January and 5 February 216, Cao Cao left Nanzheng and headed back to Ye (present-day Handan, Hebei), leaving behind Xiahou Yuan to guard Hanzhong.

== In popular culture ==
The battle is featured as a playable stage in Koei's video games Dynasty Warriors 5: Xtreme Legends and Dynasty Warriors 7 as well as Warriors Orochi 3.
