= Xu Huang =

Chinese general serving warlord Cao Cao (died 227)

- 徐晃
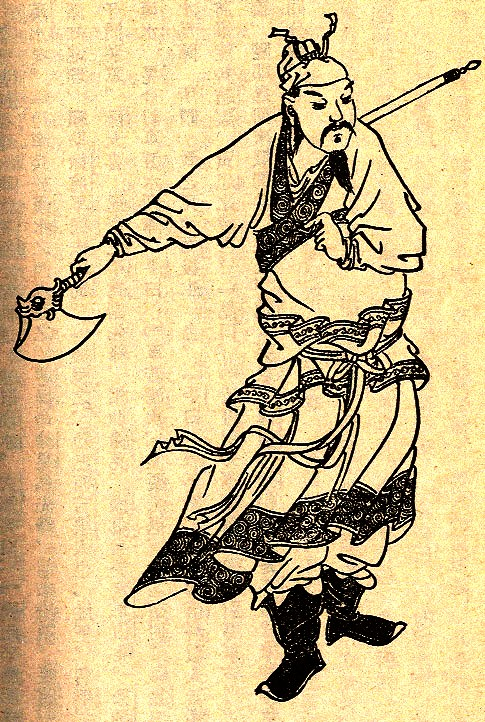
- A Qing dynasty illustration of Xu Huang

General of the Right (右將軍)
- In office 220 – 227
- Monarch: Cao Pi/Cao Rui

General Who Pacifies Bandits (平寇將軍)
- In office 214 – 220
- Monarch: Emperor Xian of Han
- Chancellor: Cao Cao

General Who Sweeps Across the Wilderness (橫野將軍)
- In office 207 – 214
- Monarch: Emperor Xian of Han
- Chancellor: Cao Cao (from 208)

Personal details
- Born: Unknown Hongtong County, Shanxi
- Died: 227
- Children: Xu Gai
- Occupation: Military general
- Courtesy name: Gongming (公明)
- Posthumous name: Marquis Zhuang (壯侯)
- Peerage: Marquis of Yangping (陽平侯)

Xu Huang (died 227), courtesy name Gongming, was a Chinese military general serving under the warlord Cao Cao in the late Eastern Han dynasty of China. He later served in the state of Cao Wei during the Three Kingdoms period under the first two rulers, Cao Pi and Cao Rui, before his death at the start of Cao Rui's reign. Xu Huang is best noted for breaking the siege at the Battle of Fancheng in 219 by routing the enemy commander Guan Yu on the field.

Chen Shou, who wrote the third-century historical text Sanguozhi, named Xu Huang as one of the Five Elite Generals of Cao Wei, alongside Yu Jin, Zhang He, Yue Jin and Zhang Liao.

== Early life and service under Yang Feng ==
Xu Huang was born in Yang County (楊縣), Hedong Commandery, which is located southeast of present-day Hongtong County, Shanxi, in the late Eastern Han dynasty. He served as a minor official in the commandery office in his youth. Later, he became a subordinate of Yang Feng, a former White Wave Bandit who later became a general under the Han central government. Xu Huang later followed Yang Feng to attack rebels and was commissioned as a Cavalry Commandant (騎都尉) as a reward for his efforts.

Between 192 and 195, Li Jue and Guo Si controlled the Han central government and held the figurehead Emperor Xian hostage in the imperial capital, Chang'an (present-day Xi'an, Shaanxi). In 195, internal conflict broke out between Li Jue and Guo Si, whose respective factions started warring with each other in the streets of Chang'an. Yang Feng and Xu Huang were Li Jue's subordinates at the time. In the same year, Xu Huang managed to convince Yang Feng to escort Emperor Xian from Chang'an back to the old Han imperial capital, Luoyang. After Emperor Xian made it safely to Anyi County (安邑縣; west of present-day Xia County, Shanxi), he rewarded Xu Huang by granting him the peerage of a Marquis of a Chief Village (都亭侯).

After they returned to Luoyang with Emperor Xian, internal conflict broke out between the generals Han Xian and Dong Cheng, who were among those who escorted the emperor back to Luoyang. During this time, Xu Huang persuaded Yang Feng to summon the warlord Cao Cao to Luoyang to help them deal with the crisis and protect the emperor. In early 196, Cao Cao and his troops showed up in Luoyang and fetched Emperor Xian to their base in Xu (許; present-day Xuchang, Henan), which became the new Han imperial capital. Yang Feng initially wanted to heed Xu Huang's suggestion and join Cao Cao, but ultimately refused and went his own way. Xu Huang followed him.

In late 196, after Cao Cao defeated Yang Feng in battle at Liang State (around present-day Shangqiu, Henan), Xu Huang pledged allegiance to Cao Cao.

== Cao Cao's campaigns in central and northern China ==
Cao Cao sent Xu Huang with an army to attack rebels at Juan County (卷縣; west of present-day Yuanyang County, Henan) and Yuanwu County (原武縣; present-day Yuanyang County, Henan). Xu Huang defeated them and was promoted to Major-General (裨將軍).

During the battles between Cao Cao and Lü Bu in Xu Province in 198, Xu Huang attacked and defeated Lü Bu's subordinates Zhao Shu (趙庶) and Li Zou (李鄒). With aid from Shi Huan, he also defeated and killed Sui Gu (眭固) in Henei Commandery (around present-day Jiaozuo, Henan).

In the year 200, during the Battle of Guandu between Cao Cao and Yuan Shao, Xu Huang participated in the early skirmishes at Boma (白馬; near Hua County, Henan) and Yan Ford (延津; present-day Yanjin County, Henan) where he helped to defeat the warlord Liu Bei – who had joined Yuan Shao after losing Xu Province – and Yuan Shao's generals Yan Liang and Wen Chou. He was promoted to Lieutenant-General (偏將軍) for his achievements, and later joined Cao Hong in eliminating rebels led by Zhu Bi (祝臂) at Yinjiang (㶏疆; southwest of present-day Xuchang, Henan).

Yuan Shao had stored his supplies at a depot in Gushi (故市; southwest of present-day Yanjin County, Henan). Cao Cao sent Xu Huang and Shi Huan to attack this position. They defeated the defenders at Gushi and burnt down Yuan Shao's grain carts, forcing Yuan Shao to call for relief supplies in response to this raid. Xu Huang received the title of a Marquis of a Chief Village (都亭侯) for his contributions.

A few years later, Xu Huang joined Cao Cao on a campaign against the heirs of Yuan Shao, who had died in 202. In 203, Han Fan (韓範), the Prefect of Yiyang County (易陽縣; northeast of present-day Handan, Hebei), pretended to surrender to Cao Cao while buying time to strengthen his defences. Xu Huang then wrote a letter to Han Fan, tied it to an arrow and fired it into the county. Han Fan became convinced after reading Xu Huang's letter and decided to surrender Yiyang County without putting up resistance.

Before the fall of Yiyang County, Xu Huang went to see Cao Cao and asked him to refrain from massacring the population after Han Fan surrendered. The rationale of their final decision was entirely based on tactical consideration, which was to induce other enemy territories into voluntarily surrendering by setting an example. Cao Cao approved Xu Huang's suggestion.

Xu Huang later set up an ambush and routed the Yuans' forces at Maocheng (毛城), defeated Yuan Tan at the Battle of Nanpi, and suppressed a revolt in Pingyuan Commandery (around present-day Dezhou, Shandong). He also participated in Cao Cao's campaign against Yuan Shang, Yuan Xi and the Wuhuan tribes which led to the Battle of White Wolf Mountain in 207. Xu Huang was further promoted to General Who Sweeps Across the Wilderness (橫野將軍) for his contributions in battle.

== Battle of Jiangling ==
In 208, Xu Huang followed Cao Cao to pacify Jing Province (covering present-day Hubei and Hunan), and participated in the Battle of Red Cliffs in the winter of 208–209. When Cao Cao retreated north after his defeat at Red Cliffs, Xu Huang was ordered to stay behind with Cao Ren in Jiangling County to resist attacks by Sun Quan's forces.

During this time, Xu Huang was stationed at Fancheng (樊城; present-day Fancheng District, Xiangyang, Hubei) and he defeated opposing forces in Zhonglu (中廬), Linju (臨沮) and Yicheng (宜城) counties. During the Battle of Jiangling, he joined Man Chong in attacking Guan Yu at Han Ford (漢津), and Cao Ren in resisting attacks by Zhou Yu at Jiangling.

== Cao Cao's northwestern campaigns ==
In 210, Xu Huang led his troops to attack rebels in Taiyuan Commandery (around present-day Taiyuan, Shanxi), besieged them in Daling County (大陵縣; northeast of present-day Wenshui County, Shanxi), and defeated and killed the rebel leader Shang Yao (商曜).

In 211, when Han Sui and Ma Chao led a coalition of northwestern warlords to start an uprising in Liang Province (covering parts of present-day Shaanxi and Gansu), Cao Cao ordered Xu Huang to move to Fenyin County (汾陰縣; southwest of present-day Wanrong County, Shanxi) and pacify the people in Hedong Commandery. He also awarded Xu Huang gifts of cattle and alcohol, and allowed him to repair and clean up his ancestors' tombs.

When Cao Cao led his forces to Tong Pass to engage the coalition, he became worried that he could not cross the Wei River to attack the enemy so he consulted Xu Huang for advice. Xu Huang suggested to Cao Cao to send him north and cross the Yellow River via Puban Ford to circumvent Tong Pass from the west of the river. (Note: Pei Songzhi pointed out that Chen Shou made a mistake when he quoted Xu Huang referring to himself as "your subject" (臣) in front of Cao Cao because Cao Cao was not a vassal king yet at the time.)

Cao Cao approved Xu Huang's plan and sent him and Zhu Ling to lead 4,000 troops across the river. They crossed Puban and started pitching camps, but before the defence fortification was completed, one of the coalition members, Liang Xing (梁興), discovered their presence and led some 5,000 troops to attack them. Xu Huang and Zhu Ling managed to hold off Liang Xing and allow Cao Cao and his remaining forces to cross the river. (Note: In his Zizhi Tongjian Kaoyi, Sima Guang pointed out that Cao Cao's biography in Sanguozhi attributed the two generals crossing Puban Ford to Cao Cao's planning. Sima opinioned that Chen Shou created this contradiction in his attempts to praise both Cao Cao and Xu Huang in their respective biographies.)

After Cao Cao's victory at Tong Pass, he sent Xu Huang and Xiahou Yuan to pacify the various Di tribes in Yumi County (隃麋縣; east of present-day Qianyang County, Shaanxi) and Qian County (汧縣; south of present-day Long County, Shaanxi). Xu Huang and Xiahou Yuan later rendezvoused with Cao Cao's main army at Anding Commandery (around present-day Zhenyuan County, Gansu). After Cao Cao had returned to Ye (in present-day Handan, Hebei), he sent Xu Huang and Xiahou Yuan again to suppress revolts in Fu County (鄜縣; southwest of present-day Huangling County, Shaanxi) and Xiayang County (夏陽縣; southwest of present-day Hancheng, Shaanxi), where they defeated Liang Xing and forced some 3,000 civilian households into submission.

When Cao Cao embarked on another campaign in western China to attack the warlord Zhang Lu in Hanzhong, he sent Xu Huang with a separate force to pacify the Di tribes living in Du (櫝) and Chouyi (仇夷) mountains. Xu Huang succeeded and was promoted to General Who Pacifies Bandits (平寇將軍). Later, Xu Huang also lifted rebels' siege on Zhang Shun (張順), one of Cao Cao's officers, and defeated the rebel leader Chen Fu (陳福) and destroyed some 30 rebel camps.

== Hanzhong Campaign ==
Cao Cao returned to Ye (in present-day Handan, Hebei) after his victory over Zhang Lu at the Battle of Yangping in 215. He left Xu Huang and Xiahou Yuan behind to defend Hanzhong Commandery against attacks by Liu Bei.

During this time, Liu Bei sent Chen Shi to lead troops to cut off Xiahou Yuan's supply routes at Mamingge (馬鳴閣), Hanzhong's main communication line. Xu Huang led a separate detachment to launch a fierce attack on Chen Shi and defeated him. The casualty rate on Chen Shi's side was very high as many of his soldiers were forced to jump off the cliff during the attack.

Cao Cao was delighted when he heard of the victory and he gave orders to Xu Huang: "This pass is a crucial gateway into Hanzhong. Liu Bei intends to isolate the pass and then move on to conquer Hanzhong. You have done well in foiling the enemy's attempt." Cao Cao then personally led reinforcements to Hanzhong Commandery to counter Liu Bei's advances.

== Battle of Fancheng ==
Xu Huang's most glorious moment in his military career came at the Battle of Fancheng in 219. When Fancheng (樊城; in present-day Xiangyang, Hubei) and Xiangyang were besieged by Liu Bei's general Guan Yu, Cao Cao first sent Yu Jin to lead a relief force to lift the siege but Yu Jin's seven armies were destroyed by a flood. Cao Cao then ordered Xu Huang to lead a second relief force to lift the siege. Cao Ren, the general defending Fancheng, and Lü Chang (呂常), who defended Xiangyang, were both under siege for months.

Knowing that most of his soldiers were composed of new recruits without training, Xu Huang did not go straight into battle but camped behind the enemy at Yanglingbei (陽陵陂; northwest of present-day Xiangyang, Hubei) to impose a deterrent effect. In the meantime, Cao Cao sent subordinates Xu Shang (徐商) and Lü Jian (呂建) to assist Xu Huang and instructed Xu Huang to advance only when Xu Shang, Lü Jian and all other reinforcements had arrived.

At the time, Guan Yu had set up a camp at Yancheng (偃城; north of present-day Xiangyang, Hubei). When Xu Huang showed up, he ordered his troops to pretend to dig trenches around Yancheng to fool the enemy into thinking that they were trying to cut off the supply routes leading to Yancheng. The enemy fell for his ruse, burnt down their camp and abandoned their position, thus allowing Xu Huang to gain a foothold at Yancheng. After capturing Yancheng, Xu Huang pressed on and set up two linked camps about 30 zhangs away from Guan Yu's encirclement. Before Xu Huang attacked, Cao Cao sent Yin Shu (殷署), Zhu Gai (朱蓋) and other officers to lead another 12 military units to support him.

Guan Yu's encirclement was made up of five camps – one main camp leading the siege and four supporting camps. Xu Huang deliberately spread news that he was going to attack the main camp to trick Guan Yu into strengthening his defences at the main camp. In the meantime, he secretly sent his forces to attack the four supporting camps and succeeded in destroying them. When Guan Yu saw that the four camps were down, he personally led 5,000 troops to engage the enemy. Xu Huang launched a fierce attack on Guan Yu and succeeded in defeating him and lifting the siege on Fancheng. During Xu Huang's attack, many of Guan Yu's soldiers panicked and fled towards the nearby Han River, where they drowned.

When Cao Cao heard of the victory, he praised Xu Huang: "The enemy formation was very thick, yet you managed to achieve victory and destroyed their camps and killed so many of their men. I have fought in battles for over 30 years, but I have never heard of any person in history who attempted to break a siege by launching a direct attack on the enemy's encirclement. The situation at Fancheng and Xiangyang was much worse than that at Ju and Jimo. (Note: Cao Cao was referring to the military exploits of Tian Dan, a general of the Qi state in the Spring and Autumn period. In 284 BCE, Tian Dan successfully defended the city of Ju (莒; formerly the Ju state, which was annexed by Qi) from an attack by the Yan state. He defeated Yan forces again later in 279 BCE at the siege of Jimo (即墨) by using the "Fire Cattle Columns" strategy.) Your achievements are comparable to those of Sun Wu and Rangju." (Note: "Rangju" refers to Tian Rangju, a general of the Qi state in the Spring and Autumn period who was famous for his military discipline.)

The Shu Ji (蜀記) recorded an incident about Xu Huang meeting Guan Yu on the battlefield. Xu Huang had a close personal friendship with Guan Yu. They often chatted about other things apart from military affairs. When they met again at Fancheng, Xu Huang gave an order to his men: "Whoever manages to take Guan Yunchang's head will be rewarded with 1,000 jin of gold." Guan Yu was shocked and he asked Xu Huang: "Brother, what are you talking about?" Xu Huang replied: "This is an affair of the State."

Upon Xu Huang's return, Cao Cao went seven li out of Xuchang to greet him, giving him full credit for securing Fancheng and Xiangyang. Throughout the field reception, the soldiers of other commanders shifted about in order to get a better view of Cao Cao, but Xu Huang's men stood stationary in neat files. Seeing this, Cao Cao remarked: "General Xu has truly inherited the style of Zhou Yafu."

== Service under Cao Pi and Cao Rui ==
Following Cao Cao's death in March 220, his son Cao Pi succeeded him and inherited his vassal king title as the King of Wei (魏王). Xu Huang continued to be heavily trusted by Cao Pi, and he was appointed General of the Right (右將軍) and enfeoffed as the Marquis of Lu District (逯鄉侯).

In late 220, Cao Pi usurped the throne from Emperor Xian, ended the Eastern Han dynasty, and established the state of Cao Wei (or Wei) with himself as the new emperor. After his coronation, Cao Pi promoted Xu Huang from a district marquis to a county marquis under the title "Marquis of Yang" (楊侯).

Later, Cao Pi ordered Xu Huang and Xiahou Shang to lead an army to attack Shangyong Commandery (in present-day northwestern Hubei). After completing his mission, Xu Huang moved to the garrison at Yangping County (陽平縣; present-day Shen County, Shandong), so his marquis title was changed to "Marquis of Yangping" (陽平侯).

Cao Pi died in 226 and was succeeded by his son Cao Rui as the emperor of Wei. During that time, Xu Huang successfully repelled an invasion on Xiangyang by the Wu general Zhuge Jin. For his contributions, he was awarded another 200 taxable households in his marquisate, bringing the total number to 3,100.

When Xu Huang became seriously ill later, he gave instructions that he was to be given a simple burial after his death. He died in 227 and was granted the posthumous title "Marquis Zhuang" (壯侯), which literally means "robust marquis".

Xu Huang's son, Xu Gai (徐蓋), inherited his father's peerage as the Marquis of Yangping. After Xu Gai died, his son Xu Ba (徐霸) succeeded him as the next Marquis of Yangping. Cao Rui later divided their marquisate and awarded marquis titles to two descendants of Xu Huang.

== Appraisal ==
Chen Shou concluded Xu Huang's biography in the Sanguozhi with a brief appraisal:

"Xu Huang led a humble and simple life and he was very self-disciplined. When he went into battle and realised he could not win, he would still encourage his men to fight on in pursuit of glory and they did not rest or have meals until they had won. He often sighed: 'The people in the past complained that they did not have a chance to meet and serve a wise lord. Now, I am privileged to have encountered one, so I should do my best to serve him instead of seeking to increase my personal fame!' He did not maintain a wide social network throughout his life."

== In Romance of the Three Kingdoms ==
Xu Huang is a character in the 14th-century historical novel Romance of the Three Kingdoms, which romanticises the events before and during the Three Kingdoms period of China. He makes his first appearance in Chapter 13 as a subordinate of Yang Feng. Xu Huang and Yang Feng escort Emperor Xian back to Luoyang after the emperor escapes from Li Jue and Guo Si's clutches in Chang'an.

When Cao Cao comes to Luoyang to fetch the emperor to his base in Xuchang, Yang Feng sends Xu Huang to stop him. Cao Cao knows on first sight that Xu Huang is an extraordinary man so he orders Xu Chu to duel with Xu Huang. Neither side can gain an advantage over each other after 50 bouts, and by then, Cao Cao is very impressed by Xu Huang's skill. Not wanting either of the two men to get hurt, Cao Cao calls for Xu Chu to retreat. Man Chong, one of Cao Cao's subordinates, knows that his lord wants to recruit Xu Huang so he volunteers to persuade Xu Huang to defect to their side. That very night, Man Chong disguises himself as a common soldier, sneaks into Xu Huang's tent and manages to convince him to switch allegiance to Cao Cao. Man Chong then suggests that Xu Huang slays Yang Feng to prove his loyalty to Cao Cao, but Xu Huang refuses to kill his former superior out of respect for him.

In the novel, Xu Huang meets his end during the Xincheng Rebellion when he is struck by an arrow in the forehead fired by the rebel leader Meng Da. His men immediately take him back to camp, where the physician removes the arrow and tries to heal him, but Xu Huang eventually dies later that night. The novel states that he is 59 years old at the time of his death. This figure, however, is not supported by any evidence from historical records.

== In popular culture ==
Xu Huang is featured as a playable character in Koei's Dynasty Warriors and Warriors Orochi video game series. He also appears in all instalments of Koei's Romance of the Three Kingdoms strategy game series.

== See also ==
- Five Elite Generals
- Lists of people of the Three Kingdoms
