= Yue Jin =

Chinese Han dynasty general (died 218)

- 樂進

General of the Right (右將軍)
- In office 215 – 218
- Monarch: Emperor Xian of Han
- Chancellor: Cao Cao

General Who Breaks and Charges (折衝將軍)
- In office 206 – 215
- Monarch: Emperor Xian of Han
- Chancellor: Cao Cao (from 208)

Personal details
- Born: Unknown Qingfeng County, Henan
- Died: 218 (Note: Yue Jin's biography in the Sanguozhi recorded that he died in the 23rd year of the Jian'an era of the reign of Emperor Xian. This corresponds to the year 218 in the Gregorian calendar.)
- Children: Yue Lin
- Occupation: General
- Courtesy name: Wenqian (文謙)
- Posthumous name: Marquis Wei (威侯)
- Peerage: Marquis of Guangchang Village (廣昌亭侯)

Yue Jin (died 218), courtesy name Wenqian, was a military general serving under the warlord Cao Cao in the late Eastern Han dynasty of China. He was noted as much for his short stature as for his valour and ferocity on the battlefield. Yue Jin participated in most of Cao Cao's early military exploits, and gained multiple successes in the campaigns against Lü Bu, Liu Bei, remnants of the Yellow Turban rebels, and Yuan Shao and his associates. He was particularly praised as a capable vanguard, but his most famed accomplishment came with his supporting role in the defence of Hefei against Sun Quan's forces at the Battle of Xiaoyao Ford of 214–215.

Chen Shou, who wrote the third-century historical text Sanguozhi, named Yue Jin as one of the Five Elite Generals of his time, alongside Yu Jin, Zhang He, Zhang Liao and Xu Huang.

== Early life ==
Yue Jin was born in Yangping Commandery (陽平郡), which is present-day Qingfeng County, Henan, in the late Eastern Han dynasty. He was small-sized and short but was known for his courage. When he first came to serve under the warlord Cao Cao, he was appointed as a clerk who handled administrative tasks in camp.

Around early 190, when Cao Cao was raising troops to join the campaign against the warlord Dong Zhuo who controlled the Han central government, Yue Jin was tasked to recruit soldiers for Cao Cao's camp, in which he brought back 1,000 men from his hometown. For his effort, Yue Jin was put into test as an acting Major (司馬) and Formation Breaking Commandant (陷陣都尉).

== Solidifying Cao Cao's position ==
In 194, the warlord Lü Bu occupied Cao Cao's base, Yan Province, with help from defectors from Cao Cao's side when Cao Cao was away on a campaign against Tao Qian, the Governor of Xu Province. Yue Jin and Cao Hong were assigned to lead the vanguard when Cao Cao's army returned to take back Yan Province. Cao Cao and Lü Bu fought several battles around Puyang, resulting in mainly defeats for Cao Cao, but Yue Jin's contributions in those battles were still recognised by his superior. Yue Jin also participated in Cao Cao's battles against Zhang Chao at Yongqiu (雍丘; present-day Qi County, Henan) and Qiao Rui (橋蕤) at Ku County (苦縣; present-day Luyi County, Henan), in which he served as the vanguard and was the first to break the enemy's defences in both battles. He was enfeoffed as the Marquis of Guangchang Village (廣昌亭侯), and became highly valued in Cao Cao's camp.

Between 197 and 198, Yue Jin followed Cao Cao to subdue Zhang Xiu, who feigned surrender and defeated Cao Cao at the Battle of Wancheng. Much hardships were experienced during the campaign, but Yue Jin, along Yu Jin, was recorded to have earned merit during the battles. Due to the fact that Zhang Xiu was backed by Liu Biao, the Governor of Jing Province, Cao Cao realised that Zhang Xiu could not be defeated within a short period of time. Under the rationale that Liu Bei was asking for help in Xiaopei (小沛; present-day Pei County, Jiangsu) to fight Lü Bu, Cao Cao finally relinquished his war against Zhang Xiu, and sent envoys to ask Zhang Xiu to form an alliance, which Zhang Xiu agreed upon the term that a marriage be arranged between the two families. During the siege of Xiapi, Yue Jin led a separate command and defeated one of Lü Bu's deputies outside the city before he joined the encirclement.

After Lü Bu's defeat and death, Cao Cao focused on preparation to the upcoming war with his rival Yuan Shao, and Yue Jin was assigned to the border. When the warlord of Bing Province, Zhang Yang, vacillated on the predicament upon choosing Cao Cao or Yuan Shao as his ally, his subordinate Yang Chou (楊醜) murdered him and took his head to Cao Cao. However, Sui Gu (眭固), a former Heishan bandit, killed Yang Chou when he was on his way to the imperial capital Xu (許; present-day Xuchang, Henan). In order to merge Zhang Yang's remnants, Yue Jin intercepted Sui Gu when the latter attempted to go back north, and successfully hunted down his prey and took control of the Bing Province troops. He then brought his troops to join Cao Cao's eastern campaign against Liu Bei, who had just killed Che Zhou (車冑), the Governor of Xu Province, and taken control of the province. Within a very short time, Liu Bei was defeated, and his aide, Guan Yu, was captured alive. Yue Jin was promoted to Colonel Who Attacks Bandits (討寇校尉) for his achievements.

== Cao Cao's northern campaign ==
=== Skirmishes ===
Yue Jin participated in the pivotal Battle of Guandu in 200, in which Cao Cao pitted his forces against those of his rival, Yuan Shao. Before Cao Cao led the main army to the frontline, Yue Jin was assigned several thousand soldiers to reinforce Yu Jin at Yan Ford (延津; north of present-day Yanjin County, Henan). After rendezvousing with Yu Jin, they selected 5,000 elite soldiers composed of infantry and cavalry, and raided Yuan Shao's detached encampments along the Yellow River southwest from Yan Ford. They snaked up to as far as Ji County (汲縣; 25 li southwest of present-day Weihui, Henan), and crossed the river to raid Huojia County to the north. (Note: At the time, the river flowed south of Huojia, thus Huojia was on the north bank of the river.) In all, they had set fire to some 30 enemy camps, killed thousands of enemies, captured several thousand men alive, and forced the surrender of some 20 officers, including He Mao (何茂) and Wang Mo (王摩).

=== Major engagements ===
Later on, Cao Cao ordered Yu Jin to camp at Yuanwu County (原武縣; present-day Yuanyang County, Henan) and summoned Yue Jin back. A series of engagements were fought, and some of Yuan Shao's top generals had been killed, but Yuan Shao still possessed a huge army, which put much pressure on Cao Cao. The war had been dragging on for months, and Cao Cao's supplies nearly depleted. When Cao Cao considered retreating, he received a piece of intelligence concerning the whereabouts of his enemy's food storage, which was guarded by Yuan Shao's general Chunyu Qiong. Determined to bet on the information, he picked Yue Jin as his vanguard in this desperate mission, and sneaked their way to Wuchao (烏巢; in present-day Yanjin, Henan) with 5,000 troops composed of mainly cavalry. Under the cover of night, they were unopposed until they arrived the enemy encampment, where they set fire to Yuan Shao's supplies. Chunyu Qiong attempted to fight back with his larger force, but was slain by Yue Jin in the chaos. The success of this raid in Wuchao enabled Cao Cao to score a decisive victory over Yuan Shao's at Guandu.

After the ultimate defeat and subsequent death of Yuan Shao, Cao Cao marched his troops northwards into Ji Province and You Province to stamp out Yuan Shao's heirs and supporters. Cao Cao's progress was checked at the Battle of Liyang (黎陽; northeast of present-day Xun County, Henan), where the war entered a stalemate when the two forces fought on the open field. Yue Jin then targeted the unit of Yan Jing (嚴敬), an officer under Yuan Shang, routed it. Yan Jing's defeat frightened the Yuan brothers, who went back into the city and fled during the night. Yue was promoted to acting Guerrilla General (游擊將軍). He then followed Cao Cao to besiege Ye (in present-day Handan, Hebei) and breached the city's walls. During the Battle of Nanpi, Yuan Tan personally led a counter-offensive, and inflicted considerable damage to Cao Cao's elite cavalry force: the Tiger and Leopard Cavalry (虎豹騎). Nevertheless, Yue Jin climbed the city wall and opened the east gate, and the Tiger and Leopard Cavalry took its revenge by taking Yuan Tan's head.

In 206, Cao Cao wrote a memorial to Emperor Xian, praising the efforts of Yue Jin, Yu Jin and Zhang Liao in the campaigns in northern China. Yue Jin was promoted to General Who Breaks and Charges (折衝將軍) by the Han imperial court in recognition of his contributions.

=== Winding-up ===
When a local gentry and relative of the Yuans, Gao Gan, reneged on his surrender and revolted, Cao Cao despatched Yue Jin to suppress the rebellion. Yue Jin outflanked Gao Gan by adopting a circuitous route to the north of Gao's position. However, Gao Gan outmanoeuvred his opponent by retreating to Hu Pass (壺關; in present-day Huguan County, Shanxi), where he relied on the mountain pass's strong defences. Several battles were fought on the field, resulting in defeats on Gao Gan's side, but Gao Gan remained defiant, and Yue Jin was unable to take the pass alone. When the reinforcements led by Cao Cao arrived, they breached the pass and killed every defender. Later, Yue Jin and Li Dian were assigned as vanguards to attack a pirate force led by Guan Cheng (管承), whom they defeated and forced into surrender. As Jing Province (covering present-day Hubei and Hunan) had yet to be pacified, Cao Cao ordered Yue Jin to garrison at Yangzhai County (陽翟縣; present-day Yuzhou, Henan) later.

== War with Sun Quan ==
After Cao Cao successfully unified central and northern China under his control in 208, he assembled an army to attack Liu Bei, who had allied with the warlord Sun Quan, who controlled the Jiangdong region in southern China. However, he was decisively defeated by the allies at the Battle of Red Cliffs later that year and was forced to retreat north.

=== Battle of Jiangling ===
As a result of the disastrous defeat at the Red Cliffs, Cao Cao's huge army was scattered around the northern plain above the Yangtze River. Yue Jin was ordered to station inside the city of Xiangyang, in anticipation of counterstrikes by Sun Quan's general Zhou Yu. When Liu Bei's general Guan Yu was attempting to cut the connection between Jiangling County and Xiangyang, he was stymied by Yue Jin, who led his army out and defeated him. During Guan Yu's second attempt to block the waterway of Xiangyang, Yue Jin attacked Guan Yu again on the water near Xiakou (夏口; in present-day Wuhan, Hubei) and drove him away.

The war dragged on and Cao Cao's side had suffered high casualties in the battles. Knowing Cao Cao's position in Nan Commandery (南郡; around present-day Jingzhou, Hubei) had worsened, Yue Jin raised an army in Xiangyang and hurried down to Jiangling County, where he attacked and won several skirmishes over Liu Bei's forces. Yue Jin forced the barbarians of southern Jing Province to surrender, and mimicked Guan Yu's infiltration strategy to attack Du Pu (杜普) and Liang Da (梁大), the respective chiefs of Linju (臨沮) and Jingyang (旌陽) counties, which were Liu Bei's territories. Yue Jin defeated and totally routed the forces of Du Pu and Liang Da.

=== Battle of Xiaoyao Ford ===
After Cao Cao lost the Battle of Jiangling in 208, Sun Quan attacked Hefei, prompting the former to personally led reinforcements to the scene. Yue Jin was specifically granted imperial authority on the way to Hefei. After receiving intelligence that Cao Cao had come in person, Sun Quan retreated, and Yue Jin, alongside Zhang Liao and Li Dian were left for the defence of Hefei with 7,000 soldiers. Later, Sun Quan led 100,000 naval forces and advanced to Hefei. Sun Quan's forces bypassed a 300,000 strong army led by Xiahou Dun. Following a direct order from Cao Cao, Xue Ti (薛悌) led a relief force into the city, and also served as a monitoring system to the three generals, who were not in good terms with each other. Yue Jin was ordered to stay behind to defend the city with Xue Ti – who actually assumed a higher command than Zhang Liao, and was there to ensure that the three generals executed Cao Cao's orders – while Li Dian and Zhang Liao led a force of 800 men out to engage the enemy. Sun Quan lost two generals on the first encounter, but his army managed to force Zhang Liao and Li Dian back into the fortified citadel.

However, Sun Quan's forces were unable to breach the walls of Hefei, and were subsequently infected with a plague. Thus, Sun Quan grudgingly withdrew; in order to avoid being infected, Sun Quan only had 1,000 troops with him on the northern part of Xiaoyao Ford (逍遥津). This piece of news was received by Zhang Liao, who immediately led several thousand elite cavalry to pursue the enemy commander. During the chaos, Sun Quan was nearly killed if not saved by his general Ling Tong, and the siege of Hefei came to a complete victory for Cao Cao's side. Yue Jin was promoted to General of the Right (右將軍) for his contributions in the defence of Hefei.

== Death ==
Yue Jin died in 218, but his cause of death was not documented in historical records. He was given the posthumous title "Marquis Wei" (威侯), which literally means the "awe-inspiring marquis".

== Family ==
Yue Jin's son, Yue Chen (樂綝), inherited his father's peerage as the Marquis of Guangchang Village (廣昌亭侯). Like his father, Yue Chen was also known for being decisive and determined. He served as a military officer in the state of Cao Wei during the Three Kingdoms period. In 255, when the Wei generals Guanqiu Jian and Wen Qin started a rebellion in Shouchun (壽春; present-day Shou County, Anhui), Yue Chen served as a subordinate of the Wei regent Sima Shi, who led troops to Shouchun to suppress the revolt. Sima Shi ordered another subordinate Sima Lian (司馬璉) to lead 8,000 riders to pursue Wen Qin while he was retreating after his defeat; Sima Shi also ordered Yue Chen to lead infantry and follow behind Sima Lian to provide backup. After the rebellion was quelled, Yue Chen was appointed as the Inspector (刺史) of Yang Province. On 4 June 257, (Note: Zhuge Dan started his rebellion and killed Yue Lin on the yihai day of the 5th month in the 2nd year of the Ganlu era in Cao Mao's reign. This date corresponds to 4 June 257 in the Gregorian calendar, according to this tool: https://sinocal.sinica.edu.tw/. The character "綝" has two pronunciations: "lín" and "chēn".) the Wei general Zhuge Dan also started a rebellion in Shouchun and sent his troops to kill Yue Chen. The Wei imperial court issued an edict to mourn Yue Chen, posthumously appoint him as Minister of the Guards (衞尉), and award him the posthumous title "Marquis Min" (愍侯). Yue Chen’s son, Yue Zhao (樂肇), inherited his grandfather and father's peerage as the Marquis of Guangchang Village (廣昌亭侯).

== In Romance of the Three Kingdoms ==
Yue Jin is featured as a character in the 14th-century historical novel Romance of the Three Kingdoms, which dramatises the events leading to, and during the Three Kingdoms period. However, his role in the novel was largely downplayed, and his achievements in battle were not as prominent as those described in his historical biography. He often appeared together with Li Dian.

Yue Jin first appeared in Chapter 5, in which he joined Cao Cao's forces when the latter was rallying an army to participate in the campaign against Dong Zhuo. In Chapter 11, when Cao Cao was at war with Lü Bu, Yue Jin engaged Lü Bu's general Zang Ba in a duel but neither of them could defeat his opponent after fighting for more than 30 rounds. In Chapter 23, Cao Cao praised four of his generals – Zhang Liao, Xu Chu, Yue Jin and Li Dian – in front of Mi Heng, saying that the four of them "possessed unwavering courage and surpassed Cen Peng (岑彭) and Ma Wu (馬武)." (Note: Cen Peng and Ma Wu were two prominent generals who served under Emperor Guangwu of Han.)

Yue Jin was also described to be a skilful archer in the novel. There were two incidents which showcased his skill: in Chapter 12, he fired an arrow at Lü Bu's general Cheng Lian (成廉) and killed him; in Chapter 33, he killed Yuan Tan's adviser Guo Tu with a single arrow shot when Guo was attempting to escape after his defeat.

In Chapter 53, during a battle against Sun Quan's forces, Yue Jin was described as "armed with only a sword and on horseback, he charged towards Sun Quan like a bolt of lightning, and raised his sword and slashed down when he reached his target." Sun Quan's subordinates Song Qian and Jia Hua (賈華) used their jis to block Yue Jin but their jis were split apart by Yue Jin's sword, so they used the handles to hit Yue Jin's horse.

In Chapter 68, in an engagement after the Battle of Xiaoyao Ford, Yue Jin duelled with Sun Quan's general Ling Tong for more than 50 rounds but neither of them won. Cao Xiu then fired an arrow at Ling Tong, which hit Ling's horse and caused him to be thrown off his horse. Yue Jin then moved in for the kill, but before he could slay Ling Tong, he was hit in the face by an arrow fired by Gan Ning. Both sides then rushed forth to rescue their respective generals. Cao Cao later ordered Yue Jin to be carried into his tent for medical treatment. Yue Jin did not appear again in the novel after Chapter 68.

== In popular culture ==
Yue Jin is first introduced as a playable character in the eighth instalment of Koei's Dynasty Warriors video game series.

== See also ==
- Five Elite Generals
- Lists of people of the Three Kingdoms
