= Five Elite Generals =

Group of five generals deemed to be warlord Cao Cao's best by historian Chen Shou

- Traditional Chinese: 五子良將
- Simplified Chinese: 五子良将
Transcriptions
Standard Mandarin
- Hanyu Pinyin: wú zǐ liáng jiàng

The Five Elite Generals refer to five military generals serving under the warlord Cao Cao in the late Eastern Han dynasty of China. They later served in the state of Cao Wei, founded by Cao Cao's son and successor Cao Pi, during the Three Kingdoms period. The five were Yu Jin, Zhang He, Yue Jin, Zhang Liao and Xu Huang.

The biographies of the five generals are found in the historical text Records of the Three Kingdoms (Sanguozhi) written by Chen Shou in the third century. After writing the biographies, Chen Shou commented: "Throughout Cao Cao's military exploits, these five were the crème de la crème of the best generals of that era."

Chen Shou then appraised Yu Jin, Zhang He and Yue Jin as follows:

"Yu Jin was persistent and steady but he did not remain firm until the end."
"Zhang He was famous for his ability to adapt well to changes in the situations he faced."
"Yue Jin made his name due to his bravery but his deeds are not supported by other historical sources. It could be due to lapses in documentation, which is why (information on Yue Jin) is not as complete as compared to that on Zhang Liao and Xu Huang.

== See also ==
- Five Tiger Generals
- Lists of people of the Three Kingdoms
