= Zhang Liao =

Chinese general serving warlord Cao Cao (169–222)

- 張遼
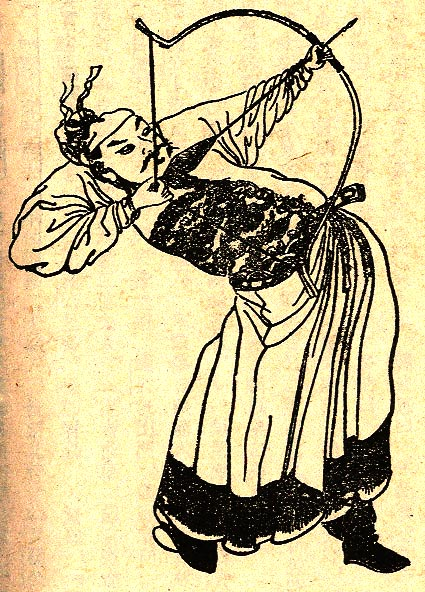
- Qing dynasty portrait

General of the Vanguard (前將軍)
- In office 220 – 222
- Monarch: Cao Pi

General Who Attacks the East (征東將軍)
- In office 215 – 220
- Monarch: Emperor Xian of Han
- Chancellor: Cao Cao

General Who Defeats Bandits (盪寇將軍)
- In office 205 – 215
- Monarch: Emperor Xian of Han
- Chancellor: Cao Cao (from 208)

Cavalry Commandant (騎都尉) (under Lü Bu)
- In office 192 – 198
- Monarch: Emperor Xian of Han

Personal details
- Born: 169 (Note: Zhang Liao's biography in the Sanguozhi recorded that he was 28 years old (by East Asian age reckoning) when he was appointed as the Chancellor of Lu State (魯國相) after following Lü Bu to Xu Province. Since Lu State was a commandery-level state in Xu Province, Lü Bu must be in charge of the province before he could appoint anyone as an official in any of the province's territories. Lü Bu seized control of Xu Province from Liu Bei in 196, so Zhang Liao most likely received the appointment in that year. By calculation, if Zhang Liao was 28 years old (by East Asian age reckoning) in 196, his birth year should be around 169. Zhang Liao's biography in the Sanguozhi recorded that he died in the same year after his subordinates defeated the Wu general Lü Fan at the Battle of Dongkou in late 222. Since Zhang Liao died in 222 and was born in 169, he was about 53 years old at the time of his death.) Shuocheng District, Shuozhou, Shanxi
- Died: late 222 (aged 53) Jiangdu District, Yangzhou, Jiangsu
- Children: Zhang Hu; at least one other son
- Occupation: Military general
- Courtesy name: Wenyuan (文遠)
- Posthumous name: Marquis Gang (剛侯)
- Peerage: Marquis of Jinyang (晉陽侯)

Zhang Liao (169 – late 222), courtesy name Wenyuan, was a Chinese military general serving under the warlord Cao Cao in the late Eastern Han dynasty of China. He served briefly in the state of Cao Wei, founded by Cao Cao's successor Cao Pi, in the early Three Kingdoms period before his death. Formerly a subordinate of other warlords such as Ding Yuan, Dong Zhuo and Lü Bu, Zhang Liao joined Cao Cao c.February 199 after Lü Bu's downfall at the Battle of Xiapi. Since then, he participated in many of Cao Cao's military campaigns, including those against Yuan Shao's heirs and the Wuhuan tribes from 201 to 207. He is best known for his pivotal role in the Battle of Xiaoyao Ford in 214–215, in which he successfully defended Hefei from the forces of the warlord Sun Quan.

Chen Shou, who wrote the third-century historical text Sanguozhi, named Zhang Liao as one of the Five Elite Generals of his time, alongside Yu Jin, Zhang He, Yue Jin and Xu Huang.

== Early career and service under Lü Bu ==
Zhang Liao was from Mayi County (馬邑縣), Yanmen Commandery, which is present-day Shuocheng District, Shuozhou, Shanxi. He was a descendant of Nie Yi (聶壹), but his family name had been changed from Nie to Zhang to avoid association with his disgraced ancestor. (Note: Nie Yi (聶壹) was a trader from Mayi County. He had a significant role in the Battle of Mayi, which took place in 133 BCE during the reign of Emperor Wu in the Western Han dynasty. Nie Yi successfully infiltrated the Xiongnu and attempted to lure them into an ambush set up by Han forces led by a minister Wang Hui (王恢). However, his plan failed because the Xiongnu felt suspicious and withdrew after learning of the ambush from a captive. Wang Hui also pulled back his forces after seeing that the enemy had retreated. After being incarcerated for his failure, he committed suicide in prison later. Nie Yi was disgraced for his role in the incident because he not only indirectly caused Wang Hui's death, but also damaged Han–Xiongnu relations, which were still maintained by the Han's heqin policy at the time. The shame was passed on to Nie Yi's descendants, even until some 300 years later in the Eastern Han dynasty. They changed their family name to avoid being associated with him.) When he was young, he served as a minor official in his home commandery, and experienced many frontier skirmishes against rebellious Donghu people during his youth.

Towards the end of the Eastern Han dynasty, Ding Yuan, the Inspector of Bing Province, heard of Zhang Liao's combat skills and hired him as an assistant officer. Ding Yuan ordered Zhang Liao to lead troops from Bing Province to the imperial capital, Luoyang, to assist the General-in-Chief, He Jin. He Jin then sent him on a mission to Hebei, where Zhang Liao managed to recruit over 1,000 men to serve in He Jin's army.

When Zhang Liao returned to Luoyang, the warlord Dong Zhuo had seized control of Luoyang in the aftermath of He Jin's assassination, and replaced He Jin as the de facto head of the Han central government. Zhang Liao and his 1,000 troops then joined Dong Zhuo's army. In 192, after Lü Bu betrayed and killed Dong Zhuo, Zhang Liao served as one of his deputies and became a Cavalry Commandant (騎都尉).

About a month after he killed Dong Zhuo, Lü Bu came under attack by Dong Zhuo's followers, who were led by Li Jue and Guo Si. They defeated him and forced him out of the imperial capital, Chang'an. (Note: Dong Zhuo relocated the Han imperial capital from Luoyang to Chang'an in 190.) Zhang Liao accompanied Lü Bu as they headed east and wandered around central and northern China until mid 195, when the warlord Liu Bei offered Lü Bu shelter in Xu Province. In 196, Lü Bu betrayed his host and seized control of Xu Province, after which he appointed a 27-year-old Zhang Liao as the Chancellor of Lu State (魯國; around present-day Qufu, Shandong). Despite technically a subordinate of Lü Bu, Zhang Liao was formally independent from Lü Bu as he held office as prefect of Beidi at that time.

In 198, Lu Bu's men were ordered to buy military horses. However, all the gold was plundered by Liu Bei's army on the way. Therefore Zhang Liao fought Liu Bei's forces along with Gao Shun, which prompted Liu Bei to ask Cao Cao for reinforcements, Cao Cao dispatched Xiahou Dun to help Liu Bei. However, Gao Shun and Zhang Liao first jointly defeated Xiahou Dun, and then jointly defeated Liu Bei at Peicheng.

== Service under Cao Cao ==
In late 198, the warlord Cao Cao, who controlled the Han central government and the figurehead Emperor Xian, defeated Lü Bu at the Battle of Xiapi and executed him in February 199. (Note: Lü Bu surrendered to Cao Cao on the guiyou day of the 12th month of the 3rd year of the Jian'an era, which corresponds to 7 Feb 199 in the Julian calendar.) Zhang Liao surrendered to Cao Cao and became one of his subordinates. He was commissioned as a General of the Household (中郎將) and received the peerage of a Secondary Marquis (關內侯). He was promoted to Major-General (裨將軍) later for his contributions in battle.

=== Persuading Chang Xi to surrender ===
In early 201, after Cao Cao defeated his northern rival Yuan Shao at the Battle of Guandu, he first sent Zhang Liao to pacify the various counties in Lu State (魯國; around present-day Qufu, Shandong), and then ordered him and Xiahou Yuan to lead an army to attack a minor warlord Chang Xi (昌豨) in Donghai Commandery (東海郡; around present-day Linyi, Shandong). Zhang Liao and Xiahou Yuan had besieged Chang Xi for months but were unable to defeat him and their supplies were running out, so they considered retreating.

Zhang Liao told Xiahou Yuan: "Over the past several days, whenever we attacked Chang Xi, I noticed he paid careful attention to me. He is also running short of arrows. I suspect he is having doubts, therefore he isn't doing his best to resist us. Wouldn't it be better if I manage to persuade him to surrender?" He then sent a message to Chang Xi and asked to speak to him. When Zhang Liao met Chang Xi, he told the latter that Cao Cao rewarded those who submitted to him. Convinced by Zhang Liao, Chang Xi agreed to surrender to Cao Cao. Zhang Liao then went to Chang Xi's home alone and visited his family. Chang Xi was delighted and he followed Zhang Liao and Xiahou Yuan back to meet Cao Cao.

When Cao Cao heard about how Zhang Liao persuaded Chang Xi to surrender, he scolded Zhang Liao: "This isn't what a great general should do." Zhang Liao replied: "I was certain that Chang Xi wouldn't dare to harm me because he knows that I am authorised by the imperial court and also because he is influenced by the prestige of you, my lord."

=== Campaigns against Yuan Shao's heirs and the Wuhuan ===
In 202, Zhang Liao accompanied Cao Cao to attack Yuan Shao's sons Yuan Tan and Yuan Shang at Liyang (黎陽; northwest of present-day Xun County, Henan). He was promoted to acting Central Resolute General (中堅將軍) for his contributions in battle. Later on, he followed Cao Cao to attack Yuan Shang at Ye (鄴; in present-day Handan, Hebei) but were unable to conquer the city so they retreated in mid 203.

After Cao Cao returned to the imperial capital, Xu (許; present-day Xuchang, Henan), he sent Zhang Liao and Yue Jin to lead an army to conquer Yin'an County (陰安縣; north of present-day Qingfeng County, Henan) and relocate its residents to the south of the Yellow River.

In early 204, Zhang Liao followed Cao Cao to attack Yuan Shang at Ye again and they succeeded in capturing the city this time. Zhang Liao also led troops to the Zhao State (趙國; around present-day Neiqiu County, Hebei) and Changshan State (常山國; around present-day Shijiazhuang, Hebei) in Ji Province, where he persuaded the Heishan bandits and other opposing forces to surrender to Cao Cao.

In 205, Zhang Liao accompanied Cao Cao to attack Yuan Tan at Nanpi County and they defeated Yuan Tan. After the battle, Zhang Liao led an army to the coastal regions and defeated bandit forces led by Liu Yi (柳毅) from Liaodong. When he returned to Ye after the campaign, Cao Cao came out of the city and personally welcomed him back. Zhang Liao was reassigned to serve as General Who Defeats Bandits (盪寇將軍).

In around 206, Cao Cao sent Zhang Liao to counter the unrest in some counties in Jiangxia Commandery (present-day eastern Hubei). Zhang Liao achieved success and returned to his garrison at Linying (臨潁; present-day Linying County, Henan). He was promoted from a Secondary Marquis to a Marquis of a Chief Village (都亭侯).

In 207, Zhang Liao followed Cao Cao on a campaign against Yuan Shang, who had allied with the Wuhuan tribes in northern China. When Cao Cao was preparing to attack the enemy in Liucheng (柳城; present-day Xingcheng, Liaoning), Zhang Liao warned him that Jing Province's Governor Liu Biao take advantage of his absence from Xu to send Liu Bei to attack Xu and take control of the capital. However, Cao Cao felt that Liu Biao would not send Liu Bei to attack Xu because he did not trust Liu Bei, so he proceeded with the campaign against Yuan Shang and the Wuhuan. When they encountered the enemy, Zhang Liao displayed great fervour and strongly urged Cao Cao to launch an attack. Cao Cao was so impressed with Zhang Liao that he passed him his personal signal flag. Zhang Liao led the assault on the Wuhuan at White Wolf Mountain (白狼山; near present-day Lingyuan, Liaoning), defeated them and executed the Wuhuan chieftain Tadun.

=== Suppressing a mutiny and a rebellion ===
Around 208, when Cao Cao was preparing to attack Jing Province, he ordered Zhang Liao to garrison at Changshe (長社; present-day Changge, Henan) and wait to mobilise. During the mobilisation, some soldiers started a mutiny and set fire to the camp at night and caused panic. Zhang Liao told his subordinates: "Don't make any move yet. There isn't a single company whose members are all involved in the mutiny, so the mutineers must be trying to cause chaos and make everyone else join them." He ordered all the soldiers who were not involved in the mutiny to remain in their positions and sit down, and then led his personal guards to the main command post to restore order. The leaders of the mutiny were identified and executed.

During the Battle of Red Cliffs, Zhang Liao were stationed in Changsha In 209, after the Battle of Red Cliffs, Chen Lan (陳蘭) and Mei Cheng (梅成) started a rebellion in Lu County (六縣; in present-day Lu'an, Anhui). Cao Cao sent two separate forces to suppress the rebellion: Yu Jin and Zang Ba to attack Mei Cheng; Zhang Liao, with Zhang He and Niu Gai (牛蓋) as his deputies, to attack Chen Lan. Mei Cheng pretended to surrender to Yu Jin, and then led his men to join Chen Lan at Mount Tianzhu as soon as Yu Jin and Zang Ba left. The paths leading up the mountain were narrow and dangerous to travel on.

When Zhang Liao wanted to attack the rebels, his subordinates advised him against it because of the hazardous terrain. However, Zhang Liao said: "This is where one-to-one fighting will take place. Only the courageous can advance forward." He then ordered his troops to make camp at the foot of the mountain. They attacked the rebels later, defeated them, and killed Chen Lan and Mei Cheng.

When Cao Cao was assessing the respective contributions of his generals in the campaign, he said, "The General Who Defeats Bandits (Zhang Liao) was the one who ascended the mountain, travelled through hazardous terrain, and defeated Chen Lan and Mei Cheng." As rewards for his success, Zhang Liao was granted acting imperial authority and given additional taxable households in his marquisate.

=== Battle of Xiaoyao Ford and aftermath ===
When Cao Cao retreated after being defeated by Sun Quan and Liu Bei at the Battle of Red Cliffs in the winter of 208–209, he left behind Zhang Liao, Yue Jin and Li Dian with about 7,000 troops to guard Hefei from attacks by Sun Quan.

Around 214, before Cao Cao went on a campaign against the warlord Zhang Lu in Hanzhong Commandery, he instructed Xue Ti (薛悌) to pass a sealed letter to the three generals at Hefei. He wrote "Open when the enemy comes" on the envelope.

Later that year, Sun Quan led about 100,000 troops to attack Hefei, so they opened the letter. It read: "If Sun Quan comes, Generals Zhang and Li will go out to fight the enemy while General Yue will defend the fortress. Xue Ti will stay out of the battle." They were confused after reading the letter.

Zhang Liao told Yue Jin and Li Dian: "Our lord is away on a campaign. By the time his reinforcements reach here, we are already done for. So he is actually instructing us to take advantage of the situation – when the enemy has just arrived and isn't fully gathered yet – to attack them and devastate their morale so we can calm our men and strengthen our defences. Victory or defeat, it all depends on this battle. Why are the two of you still hesitating?" The three generals then worked together and recruited over 800 elite soldiers that night and prepared for battle the following day.

At dawn, Zhang Liao donned his armour, carried a ji, and led his men to attack the enemy formation. He killed tens of enemy soldiers and two officers, shouted his own name, and broke through the barriers until he reached Sun Quan's command post. Sun Quan was shocked and his subordinates were all unsure of what to do. He then went to the top of a knoll, armed himself with a long ji, and stood there. He did not dare to move when Zhang Liao challenged him to come down and fight him.

When Sun Quan saw that Zhang Liao did not have many soldiers left with him, he ordered his forces to surround Zhang and his men. However, Zhang Liao fought fiercely and succeeded in breaking out of the encirclement with a few of his men. His remaining men, who were still trapped by the enemy, shouted: "General, are you abandoning us?" Zhang Liao then turned back and fought his way into the encirclement and succeeded in rescuing his remaining men.

Sun Quan and his men were all stunned by Zhang Liao's valour and did not dare to stand in his way. The skirmish lasted from dawn to the afternoon, and the morale of Sun Quan's army had fallen significantly. Zhang Liao returned to Hefei fortress and strengthened his defences. The defenders felt much more at ease and were very impressed with him.

Sun Quan was unable to conquer Hefei after several days so he withdrew his forces. While Sun Quan was retreating, Zhang Liao suddenly launched a surprise attack and inflicted a crushing defeat on the enemy at Xiaoyao Ford (逍遙津). He came very close to capturing Sun Quan a few times during the battle. Cao Cao was very impressed with Zhang Liao and promoted him to General Who Attacks the East (征東將軍). In 217, when Cao Cao launched another campaign against Sun Quan, he passed by Hefei along the way, visited the site of the Battle of Xiaoyao Ford, and spent a long time in reflection at the location. He increased the number of troops under Zhang Liao's command and then relocated Zhang's unit to a garrison at Juchao (居巢; in present-day Chaohu, Anhui).

=== Battle of Fancheng ===
In 219, when Cao Cao's general Cao Ren was being besieged at Fancheng (樊城; present-day Fancheng District, Xiangyang, Hubei) by Liu Bei's general Guan Yu, Cao Cao was away at the Hanzhong Campaign so he ordered his generals to lead troops from their respective garrisons to reinforce Cao Ren.

Around the time, Sun Quan had pledged allegiance to Cao Cao, so Zhang Liao was able to lead his forces from Juchao to help Cao Ren. However, before Zhang Liao reached Fan, Cao Cao's general Xu Huang had already defeated Guan Yu and lifted the siege on Fancheng.

Zhang Liao rendezvoused with Cao Cao, who had returned after being defeated in the Hanzhong Campaign, at Mobei (摩陂; in present-day Jia County, Henan). Cao Cao rode in a carriage and went out to personally receive Zhang Liao. He then relocated Zhang Liao to the garrison at Chen Commandery (陳郡; around present-day Zhoukou, Henan).

== Service under Cao Pi ==
Cao Cao died in early 220 and was succeeded by his son Cao Pi as the King of Wei (魏王). Cao Pi promoted Zhang Liao to General of the Vanguard (前將軍) and awarded him with 1,000 rolls of silk and 10,000 hu of grain.

When Sun Quan renounced his allegiance to Wei, Cao Pi ordered Zhang Liao to garrison at Hefei again to guard against possible attacks from Wu, and increased his marquis rank to Marquis of a Chief District (都鄉侯). Cao Pi also gave Zhang Liao's mother a carriage, sent soldiers to serve as guards in Zhang Liao's residence, and invited Zhang Liao's mother to visit Luoyang. When Zhang Liao's mother arrived, Cao Pi went out of the city and received her. All the officials who were there lined the path and paid respect to her.

In late 220, Cao Pi usurped the throne from Emperor Xian, ended the Eastern Han dynasty, and established the state of Cao Wei with himself as the new emperor. After his coronation, Cao Pi promoted Zhang Liao from a district marquis to a county marquis under the title "Marquis of Jinyang" (晉陽侯) and increased the number of taxable households in his marquisate to 2,600.

In 221, Zhang Liao travelled to the palace in Luoyang for an audience with Cao Pi, who brought him to a newly constructed hall and asked him for his opinion on how to conquer Wu. Cao Pi compared Zhang Liao to Shao Hu (召虎). (Note: Duke Mu of Shao (召穆公), personal name Shao Hu (召虎), was a noble who lived in the Western Zhou dynasty during the reigns of King Li and King Xuan. He was known for assisting King Xuan in governing the state, and once led troops to defeat barbarian forces in the Huai River area.) He also had a new mansion constructed for Zhang Liao and invited Zhang Liao's mother to live there. All the foot soldiers who accompanied Zhang Liao in the battles against Wu were reassigned to the huben (虎賁; "rapid as tigers") unit of the Imperial Guards.

In 221, after Sun Quan pledged allegiance to Wei again, Cao Pi reassigned Zhang Liao from Hefei to the garrison at Yongqiu (雍丘; present-day Qi County, Henan), where Zhang Liao fell sick. When Cao Pi learnt that Zhang Liao was ill, he sent Liu Ye to visit Zhang Liao and bring along an imperial physician to treat him. He also ordered the huben guards to serve as messengers to constantly update him on Zhang Liao's condition – to the point where these messengers frequently encountered each other along the way while they were travelling between Cao Pi and Zhang Liao's locations. Later on, before Zhang Liao had recovered, Cao Pi visited him, held his hand, gave him an imperial robe as a gift, and ordered his servants to prepare imperial cuisine for Zhang Liao. Zhang Liao returned to the garrison after his condition improved significantly.

=== Death ===
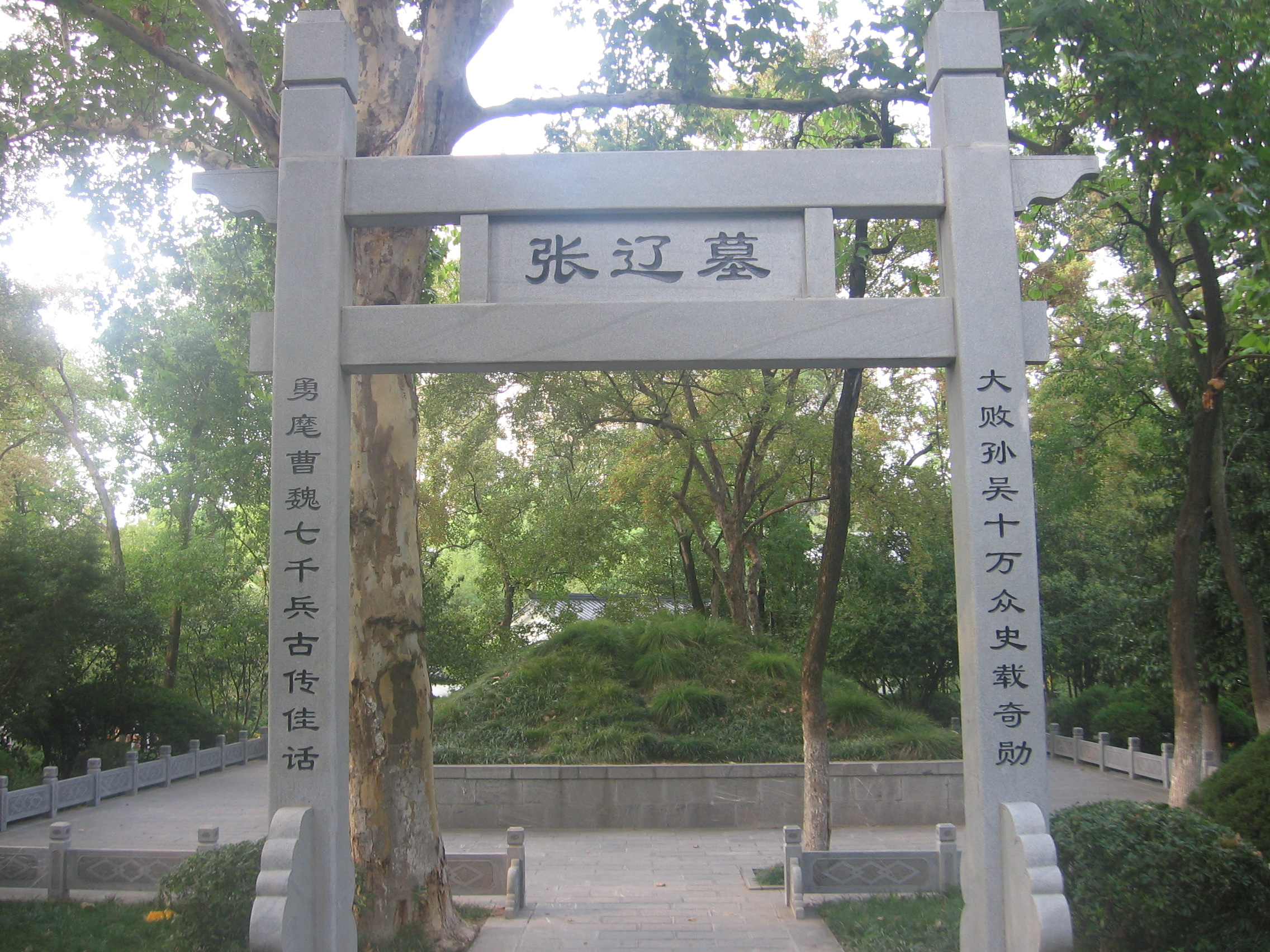
Tomb of Zhang Liao

In 222, after Sun Quan broke ties with Wei and declared himself the independent ruler of his Eastern Wu state, Cao Pi ordered Zhang Liao and Cao Xiu to lead a naval fleet to Hailing (海陵; around present-day Taizhou, Jiangsu), directly facing Wu territory across the river.

Sun Quan was afraid when he heard that Zhang Liao was there, and he warned his generals: "Zhang Liao may be ill, but he is still a foe to be reckoned with. Be careful!"

Zhang Liao and the other Wei generals initially defeated the Wu forces led by Lü Fan, but the battle eventually turned in favor of the Wu forces, and the Wei forces withdrew. Afterward, however, his condition worsened, and he died not long later in Jiangdu (江都; present-day Jiangdu District, Yangzhou, Jiangsu).

Cao Pi cried when he learnt of Zhang Liao's death. He awarded Zhang Liao the posthumous title "Marquis Gang" (剛侯), which literally means "resolute marquis". In 225, in commemoration of Zhang Liao and Li Dian for their contributions at the Battle of Xiaoyao Ford in 214–215, Cao Pi issued an imperial decree: "During the Battle of Hefei, Zhang Liao and Li Dian defeated an enemy force of 100,000 with only 800 foot soldiers. There had never been anything like this before in the history of warfare. They can be referred to as our state's 'claws and teeth' for their success in breaking the enemy's morale. I hereby increase the number of taxable households in Zhang Liao and Li Dian's marquisates by 100 each, and award a son of each of them the title of a Secondary Marquis."

== Family ==
Zhang Liao had an elder brother, Zhang Fan (張汎), who was awarded the title of a marquis in 220 before Cao Pi ended the Han dynasty. Zhang Liao's son, Zhang Hu (張虎), succeeded his father as the next Marquis of Jinyang and held the rank of a Lieutenant-General (偏將軍) in Wei. After Zhang Hu died, his son, Zhang Tong (張統), inherited the peerage. Zhang Liao probably had at least one other son apart from Zhang Hu, because that (unnamed) son of his who received the title of a Secondary Marquis (關內侯) in 225 per Cao Pi's decree was most probably not Zhang Hu.

== In Romance of the Three Kingdoms ==
Zhang Liao is featured as a character in the 14th-century historical novel Romance of the Three Kingdoms, which romanticises the events before and during Three Kingdoms period. While his fictionalised persona is generally similar to its historical counterpart, some fictitious elements were included in the novel to enhance his image as a loyal and righteous general.

See the following for other fictitious stories in the novel which involve Zhang Liao:

- Battle of Xiapi#Zhang Liao's surrender
- List of fictitious stories in Romance of the Three Kingdoms#Guan Yu's three conditions
- List of fictitious stories in Romance of the Three Kingdoms#Guan Yu releases Cao Cao at Huarong Trail
- Battle of Dongkou#In fiction

== See also ==
- Five Elite Generals
- Lists of people of the Three Kingdoms
