= Maozhou, Hebei =

Maozhou 鄚州镇
- Town
- Interactive map of Maozhou
- Coordinates: 38°51′36″N 116°07′28″E
- Country: People's Republic of China
- Province: Hebei
- Prefecture-level city: Baoding
- County-level city: Xiong County
- Village-level divisions: 30 villages
- Elevation: 12 m (39 ft)
- Time zone: UTC+8 (China Standard)
- Area code: 0317

Maozhou (Chinese: 鄚州; pinyin: Màozhōu) is a town of Xiong County in east-central Hebei province, China, located 16 kilometres (9.9 mi) north of downtown Renqiu, which can be accessed by China National Highway 106 and 57 km (35 mi) east of Baoding. As of 2011, it has 30 villages under its administration.

== See also ==
- List of township-level divisions of Hebei
