= Yu Jin =

General serving warlord Cao Cao (died 221)

- 于禁
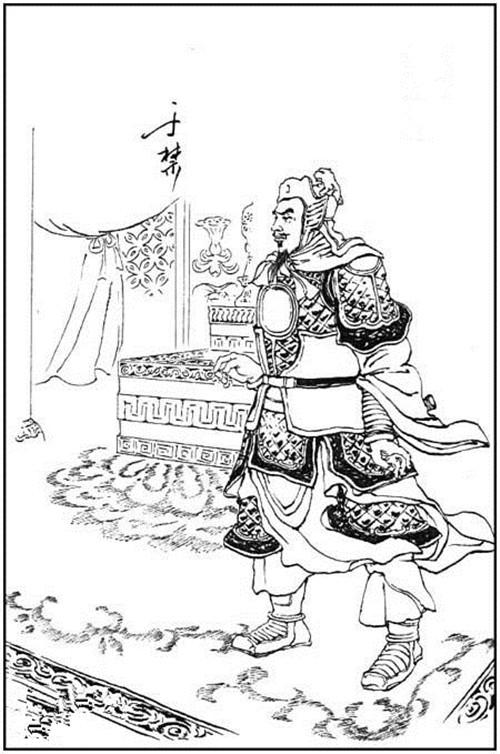

General Who Stabilises Distant Lands (安遠將軍)
- In office 221
- Monarch: Cao Pi

General of the Left (左將軍)
- In office ? – 219
- Monarch: Emperor Xian of Han
- Chancellor: Cao Cao

General of Tiger's Might (虎威將軍)
- In office 206 – ?
- Monarch: Emperor Xian of Han
- Chancellor: Cao Cao (from 208)

Personal details
- Born: Unknown Tai'an, Shandong
- Died: 221
- Children: Yu Gui; at least one other son
- Occupation: Military general
- Courtesy name: Wenze (文則)
- Posthumous name: Marquis Li (厲侯)
- Peerage: Marquis of Yishou Village (益壽亭侯)

Yu Jin (died between September 221 and January 222), courtesy name Wenze, was a Chinese general who served under the warlord Cao Cao during the end of the Han dynasty. He joined Cao Cao in 192 around the start of the civil wars leading to the collapse of the eastern Han dynasty, and fought in many of the campaigns which established his position as a central figure in the period. In 219, Yu Jin was tasked with leading forces to relieve Cao Cao's general Cao Ren, who was being besieged in Fancheng by Liu Bei's general Guan Yu, but his armies were destroyed in a flood due to heavy rains. Yu Jin surrendered to Guan Yu and became a prisoner-of-war, but was transferred to the custody of another warlord, Sun Quan, after Sun Quan's forces captured Guan Yu's bases in late 219.

Sun Quan treated Yu Jin like a guest and in 221 sent him back to the state of Cao Wei, which was founded in late 220 by Cao Cao's successor, Cao Pi, who ended the Eastern Han dynasty. Cao Pi pardoned Yu Jin and restored him to the position of a general. However, Yu Jin died later that year in regret after visiting Cao Cao's tomb, where he saw illustrations of the Battle of Fancheng depicting his surrender to Guan Yu. Chen Shou, who wrote the third-century historical text Sanguozhi, named Yu Jin as one of the Five Elite Generals of his time, alongside Zhang He, Yue Jin, Zhang Liao and Xu Huang.

== Early career ==
Yu Jin was born in Juping County (鉅平縣), Taishan Commandery (泰山郡), which is in present-day Tai'an, Shandong, in the late Eastern Han dynasty. In the early 180s, when the Yellow Turban Rebellion broke out, Yu Jin responded to the Han government's call for volunteers to serve in the imperial army and help to suppress the revolt. He became a subordinate of the general Bao Xin, who was based in Yan Province (covering present-day southwestern Shandong and eastern Henan).

In 192, after the warlord Cao Cao took charge of Yan Province, Yu Jin and his fellow volunteers were appointed as doubos (都伯; an officer leading 100 men) and placed under the command of Wang Lang. Wang Lang felt that Yu Jin was extraordinary and had the potential to become a great general, so he recommended Yu Jin to Cao Cao. Cao Cao commissioned Yu Jin as a Major (司馬) after interviewing him, and then sent him to attack Guangwei (廣威), a location in Xu Province, which was governed by Tao Qian. Yu Jin successfully conquered Guangwei and was promoted to Commandant Who Breaks Formations (陷陣都尉).

== Battles against Lü Bu, Yellow Turban remnants and Yuan Shu ==
Between 194 and 195, Yu Jin fought on Cao Cao's side in a war against a rival warlord Lü Bu for control over Yan Province. He destroyed two of Lü Bu's camps at the south of the city during a battle in Puyang while his subordinates defeated Gao Ya (高雅), one of Lü Bu's officers, at Xuchang (須昌; northeast of present-day Dongping County, Shandong).

Yu Jin later attacked Lü Bu's strongholds at Shouzhang (壽張; southwest of present-day Dongping County, Shandong), Dingtao (定陶; present-day Dingtao County, Shandong) and Lihu (離狐; southeast of present-day Puyang, Henan) counties, and captured all of them. He also besieged Zhang Chao at Yongqiu (雍丘; present-day Qi County, Henan) and conquered the county.

Around 196, Yu Jin joined Cao Cao in a campaign against remnants of the Yellow Turban rebels led by Liu Pi (劉辟), Huang Shao (黃邵) and others. They garrisoned at Banliang (版梁). One night, Huang Shao and the rebels attempted to launch a surprise attack on Cao Cao's camp, but were defeated by Yu Jin and his subordinates. Liu Pi, Huang Shao and the rebel leaders were killed and the remaining rebels surrendered. Yu Jin was promoted to Colonel Who Pacifies the Barbarians (平虜校尉).

In 197, Yu Jin besieged Qiao Rui (橋蕤), an officer serving under a rival warlord Yuan Shu, at Ku County (苦縣; present-day Luyi County, Henan) and killed Qiao Rui and four other enemy officers.

== Battles against Zhang Xiu, Lü Bu and Sui Gu ==
In 197, Yu Jin accompanied Cao Cao on a campaign against the warlord Zhang Xiu in Wancheng (宛城; present-day Wancheng District, Nanyang, Henan). Zhang Xiu initially surrendered and pledged allegiance to Cao Cao, but rebelled later and defeated Cao Cao in a surprise attack. There was chaos and disorder in Cao Cao's forces as they retreated to Wuyin County (舞陰縣; southeast of present-day Sheqi County, Henan).

Only Yu Jin led his unit to continue fighting the pursuing enemy while maintaining an orderly retreat to Wuyin County. They managed to stay together even though they had sustained many casualties and losses. When Zhang Xiu's forces slowed down on their pursuit, Yu Jin reorganised his men and led them towards Wuyin County in a dignified manner even though they had lost the battle.

Before reaching Cao Cao's position, Yu Jin encountered about a dozen injured and naked men on the road. When he asked them what happened, they told him that they were robbed by the Qingzhou Corps (青州兵). (Note: The Qingzhou Corps was a unit in Cao Cao's forces formed by the former Yellow Turban rebels who surrendered to Cao Cao in Qing Province (Qingzhou) in the early 190s.) Yu Jin turned furious and said: "The Qingzhou Corps are part of Lord Cao's army. How dare they become robbers!" He then led his men to attack and punish them. Some of the Qingzhou soldiers escaped to Wuyin County and accused Yu Jin of committing the crimes they were responsible for.

When Yu Jin reached Wuyin County, he immediately set up defensive fortifications around the camp instead of reporting directly to Cao Cao. His subordinates told him: "The Qingzhou soldiers framed you. You should explain matters to Lord Cao as soon as possible." Yu Jin replied: "The enemy is still in pursuit and may reach here anytime. If we don't set up defences now, how can we expect to hold them off? Lord Cao is intelligent and wise. Those accusations aren't a cause for concern."

After the defences were set up, Yu Jin went to meet Cao Cao and explained everything. Cao Cao felt pleased and he said, "How dangerous it was for me when we were defeated at the Yu River. General, you're able to bring order to chaos and hold your ground against a fierce enemy, and you display unwavering loyalty. Even the famous generals of ancient times couldn't have done better than you!" Yu Jin was awarded the title "Marquis of Yishou Village" (益壽亭侯) in recognition of his contributions.

In 198, Yu Jin followed Cao Cao on another campaign against Zhang Xiu at Rang County (穰縣; or Rangcheng 穰城, in present-day Dengzhou, Henan). He also participated in the Battle of Xiapi against Lü Bu, which resulted in Lü Bu's defeat and execution. Later, he joined Shi Huan (史渙) and Cao Ren in defeating Sui Gu (眭固) at Shequan County (射犬縣; present-day Qinyang, Henan).

== Guandu campaign ==
In early 200, when war broke out between Cao Cao and his northern rival Yuan Shao, with the latter initially having the upper hand, Yu Jin volunteered to lead the vanguard to engage Yuan Shao's forces. Cao Cao was impressed with Yu Jin's courage, so he placed Yu Jin in command of 2,000 infantry and cavalry and ordered him to defend Yan Ford (延津; in present-day Yanjin County, Henan) from the enemy, while he personally led another army to Guandu (官渡; northeast of present-day Zhongmu County, Henan).

Around the time, the warlord Liu Bei seized control of Xu Province after killing Che Zhou (車冑), the provincial governor whom Cao Cao had appointed. Cao Cao then led his forces to attack Liu Bei. Yuan Shao concurrently attacked Yan Ford, but Yu Jin managed to hold his position.

Later, Yu Jin and Yue Jin led 5,000 infantry and cavalry to attack Yuan Shao's camps along the Yellow River southwest of Yan Ford. They travelled to as far as Ji (汲; southwest of present-day Weihui, Henan) and Huojia (獲嘉; southeast of present-day Huojia County, Henan) counties. They set fire to over 30 enemy camps, killed or captured thousands of enemy soldiers, and forced over 20 of Yuan Shao's officers, including He Mao (何茂) and Wang Mo (王摩), into surrendering. Cao Cao then ordered Yu Jin to garrison at Yuanwu County (原武縣; present-day Yuanyang County, Henan). Yu Jin attacked and destroyed Yuan Shao's camp at Dushi Ford (杜氏津).

Yu Jin was promoted to Major-General (裨將軍) for his achievement and was then relocated to Cao Cao's camp at Guandu. During the Battle of Guandu, Yuan Shao's forces piled up earth to form small hills and constructed platforms on top for their archers, who rained arrows on Cao Cao's camp. Cao Cao's forces sustained many casualties and the soldiers were all fearful. Yu Jin firmly defended his positions, fought bravely, and displayed great fervour. He was promoted to Lieutenant-General (偏將軍) after Cao Cao scored a decisive victory over Yuan Shao at Guandu.

== Suppressing two rebellions ==
Cao Cao continued waging wars against Yuan Shao after the Battle of Guandu and against Yuan Shao's heirs and allies after Yuan Shao died in 202. By 206, after he had seized control of Ji Province (covering parts of present-day southern Hebei) from the Yuans, a minor warlord Chang Xi (昌豨) who had initially surrendered to him in early 201 (Note: See Zhang Liao#Persuading Chang Xi to surrender for information on how Chang Xi initially surrendered to Cao Cao in early 201.) rebelled against him. Cao Cao ordered Yu Jin to lead an army to attack Chang Xi. Chang Xi surrendered to Yu Jin, who was an old friend of his.

When his subordinates suggested that he send Chang Xi as a prisoner-of-war to Cao Cao and let Cao Cao decide Chang Xi's fate, Yu Jin said: "Aren't you all aware of the norms established by Lord Cao? He doesn't spare those who surrender after they are surrounded. I should follow his norms and uphold law and order. Chang Xi may be an old friend of mine, but I won't break the norms because of this!" He personally supervised Chang Xi's execution and shed tears as he gave the order.

When Cao Cao heard about it, he remarked: "Is it Heaven's will that Chang Xi had his fate decided by Yu Jin instead of me?" He regarded Yu Jin more highly than before after this incident. Yu Jin was promoted to General of Tiger's Might (虎威將軍) for his efforts in pacifying Chang Xi's revolt.

In 209, after the Battle of Red Cliffs, Chen Lan (陳蘭) and Mei Cheng (梅成) started a rebellion in Lu County (六縣; present-day Lu'an, Anhui). Cao Cao sent two separate forces to suppress the rebellion: Yu Jin and Zang Ba to attack Mei Cheng; Zhang Liao, with Zhang He and Niu Gai (牛蓋) as his deputies, to attack Chen Lan. Mei Cheng and his followers, who numbered about 3,000, surrendered when Yu Jin and Zang Ba showed up.

However, after Yu Jin and Zang Ba left, Mei Cheng rebelled again and led his men to join Chen Lan. Zhang Liao led his army to attack the rebels, but was running short of supplies, so Yu Jin headed back and oversaw the transporting of supplies to the frontline to support Zhang Liao. Zhang Liao successfully suppressed the revolt and killed the two rebel leaders. (Note: See also Zhang Liao#Suppressing a mutiny and a rebellion for more information on this rebellion.)

In recognition of his contributions during the campaign, Yu Jin was awarded an additional 200 taxable households in his marquisate, making it 1,200 households in total. Later, he was promoted to General of the Left (左將軍) and granted imperial authority. One of his sons was awarded a marquis title and given 500 households in his marquisate.

== Battle of Fancheng ==
In 219, when Cao Cao was in Chang'an, he gave orders to his general Cao Ren to attack Liu Bei's general Guan Yu at Fancheng (樊城; present-day Fancheng District, Xiangyang, Hubei). He also instructed Yu Jin to lead forces to support Cao Ren.

It was in autumn at the time and there were heavy rains. The Han River overflowed and flooded the neighbouring flat lands. The water level reached as high as several zhang. Yu Jin's seven armies were destroyed in the flood, while Yu Jin himself and his remaining men managed to escape to high ground and were trapped there.

Guan Yu led naval troops to attack Yu Jin. Yu Jin surrendered to Guan Yu, but his subordinate Pang De put up fierce resistance and ended up being captured and executed by Guan Yu when he refused to surrender.

When Cao Cao received news of Yu Jin's surrender, he mourned Pang De's death for a long time and said, "I've known Yu Jin for 30 years, yet the behaviour he displayed in the face of danger was no better than that displayed by Pang De!"

== Later life and death ==
Yu Jin remained as a prisoner-of-war in Guan Yu's base in Jing Province until late 219, when Liu Bei's territories in the province were captured by Sun Quan's general Lü Meng in a stealth invasion. Guan Yu was captured and executed by Sun Quan's forces. Yu Jin was released and brought to Wu (Sun Quan's domain), where he was treated like a guest. However, he was also ridiculed and humiliated by Yu Fan, an official serving under Sun Quan. (Note: See Yu Fan#Mocking Yu Jin for details.)

Cao Cao died in March 220 and was succeeded by his son Cao Pi. Later that year, Cao Pi ended the Eastern Han dynasty and established the state of Cao Wei with him as its first emperor. Sun Quan pledged allegiance to Cao Pi in 221 and sent Yu Jin back to Wei in autumn.

By then, Yu Jin was a pallid-looking old man with a head full of grey hair. He knelt down, kowtowed and cried when he met Cao Pi. Cao Pi comforted him, told him about Xun Linfu (Note: Xun Linfu (荀林父) was a general in the Jin state in the Spring and Autumn period. In 597 BCE, he lost the Battle of Bi against the Chu state. He requested that Duke Jing of Jin execute him as punishment for his defeat, but the duke pardoned him and reinstated him as a general. Xun Linfu redeemed himself later by defeating some of Jin's enemies in battle.) and Mengmingshi, (Note: Mengmingshi (孟明視) was a general in the Qin state in the Spring and Autumn period. He was a son of the Qin statesman Baili Xi. In 627 BCE, he lost the Battle of Xiao against the Jin state and was captured by the enemy, but was released later. He redeemed himself later by helping his lord, Duke Mu of Qin, emerge as one of the Five Hegemons of that era.) and then commissioned him as General Who Stabilises Distant Lands (安遠將軍). Cao Pi wanted to send Yu Jin as his personal representative to meet Sun Quan. Before Yu Jin left, Cao Pi ordered him to visit Cao Cao's tomb at Gaoling (高陵) in Ye (in present-day Handan, Hebei). There, Yu Jin saw illustrations of the Battle of Fancheng, in which he was depicted surrendering to Guan Yu, while Pang De was portrayed in a ferocious and courageous manner. He was so filled with regret that he fell ill, and then died. Cao Pi granted him the posthumous title "Marquis Li", which literally means "severe marquis". (Note: According to the "Rules of assigning posthumous names" chapter in the Yi Zhou Shu, an official would receive the posthumous name "Li" either for being cold-blooded and arrogant, or for having slaughtered innocent people. Quote from Yi Zhou Shu vol. 6. ch. 54: (暴慢無親曰厲。殺戮無辜曰厲。))

== Family ==
Yu Jin's son, Yu Gui (于圭), inherited his father's title "Marquis of Yishou Village" (益壽亭侯). Yu Jin probably had at least one other son, who received a marquis title and 500 households in his marquisate. (Note: See this section.)

== Appraisal ==
Chen Shou, who wrote Yu Jin's biography in the Records of the Three Kingdoms (Sanguozhi), named Yu one of the Five Elite Generals of his time, alongside Zhang Liao, Yue Jin, Zhang He and Xu Huang. He mentioned that when Cao Cao went to war, these five generals were usually in command of either the vanguard (when making offensives) or the rear guard (when retreating). Yu Jin was known for maintaining high standards of discipline in his unit and for never keeping the spoils of war for himself. As such, he was often awarded a large share of rewards after battles. However, he was very unpopular with his men because he was harsh and unforgiving in enforcing rules and regulations.

Cao Cao disliked Zhu Ling, one of his generals, and had the intention of removing him from his position. He knew that Yu Jin had an intimidating presence so he ordered Yu Jin to take control of Zhu Ling's unit. Zhu Ling and his men did not dare to move when Yu Jin showed up at their camp and took over Zhu Ling's command. Zhu Ling then became Yu Jin's subordinate and all his men obediently submitted to Yu Jin's command. Such was Yu Jin's ability to strike fear into the hearts of others.

Pei Songzhi, who annotated Yu Jin's biography in the Sanguozhi, commented that even though Yu Jin followed the book when he executed Chang Xi (who surrendered after being surrounded), he had another option – send Chang Xi as a prisoner-of-war to Cao Cao and let his lord decide Chang Xi's fate – that was still not considered a violation of the norms. Pei Songzhi felt that Yu Jin deserved his eventual fate – ending up as a prisoner-of-war and receiving a negative-sounding posthumous title ("severe marquis") after death – because he was unwilling to make an exception for an old friend, was inclined towards killing, and was harsh in suppressing dissent.

The Song dynasty poet Kong Pingzhong (孔平仲; fl. 11th–12 centuries) wrote a poem "General Yu" (于將軍) describing Yu Jin's life:

長安遣兵百勝強，意氣何有漢中王。Chang'an sends an army of indomitable champions; what resolve does the King of Hanzhong have?
七軍之心俱猛鷙，虎兕挿翼將翺翔。The Seven Armies have hearts of fierce falcons; if tigers and rhinos have feathers put on them, they would soar high.
睥睨荊益可席捲，白帝城髙如堵墻。They look with such disdain upon Jing and Yi that they would conquer them with sweeping force; but the walls of Baidicheng make for a high barrier.
秣馬蓐食朝欲戰，雷聲殷殷山之陽。They feed their horses and have breakfast while eagerly waiting to go to battle at daybreak; but thunder booms over the mountains.
沉隂苦雨十餘日，漢水溢出髙騰驤。The overcast sky releases a heavy and bitter downpour lasting over ten days; the Han River floods and waves crash overhead.
蒼黃不暇治歩伍，攀緣蹙踏半死傷。In a flurried panic, there is no time to regroup the troops; in the frenzy, over half of them are trampled to death.
計窮豈不欲奔走，四望如海皆茫茫。When you run out of ideas, would you not want to flee? Yet, looking around, everything is as vast as the sea.
鼉鳴魚躍尚恐懼，萬一敵至誰敢當。Even the turtles cry and the fish leap about in fright; if the enemy shows up, who would dare fight them?
遙觀大舩載旗鼓，聞説乃是關雲長。From the distance a large ship carrying banners and drums approaches; you hear it is Guan Yunchang.
䝉衝直繞長堤下，勁弩強弓無敵者。The mengchong heads straight to the base of the embankment; in it are crossbows and bows of unparalleled might.
雖有鐡騎何所施，排空白浪如奔馬。Even if you have elite cavalry, what use would they be? The white wave crests billow into the sky like galloping horses.
將軍拱手就縶縛，咋舌無聲面湥赭。The General surrenders without resistance and gets tied up; silent in shame, his face turns a deep ochre.
㨗書一日到錦城，隻輪不返皆西行。The report of victory takes only a day to reach the Shining City; not even a wheel turned back as they all headed west.
將軍疇昔負朋友，若此昌豨猶得生。Long ago, the General betrayed a friend; or else Chang Xi would still be alive.
循環報復雖天意，壯士所惜惟功名。Although divine retribution is the will of Heaven; all heroic men nonetheless hold their reputations dear.
曹瞞相知三十年，臨危不及龎明賢。Cao Man's dear companion of 30 years; when put into a desperate situation, he cannot even be as loyal and virtuous as Pang.
歸來頭白已顦顇，泣涕頓首尤可憐。He returns with white hair, withered with exhaustion; his weeping and kowtowing is a pitiful sight to behold.
髙陵畫像何詭譎，乃令慚痛入九泉。How deceitful and humiliating is that painting at Gaoling; with shame and sorrow it sends him to the Nine Springs.

淯水之師勇冠世，英雄成敗皆偶然。At the Yu River he showed peerless valour; a hero's success or failure is all a matter of circumstances.

== See also ==
- Five Elite Generals
- Lists of people of the Three Kingdoms
