= Zhang He =

General serving warlord Cao Cao (died 231)

- 張郃
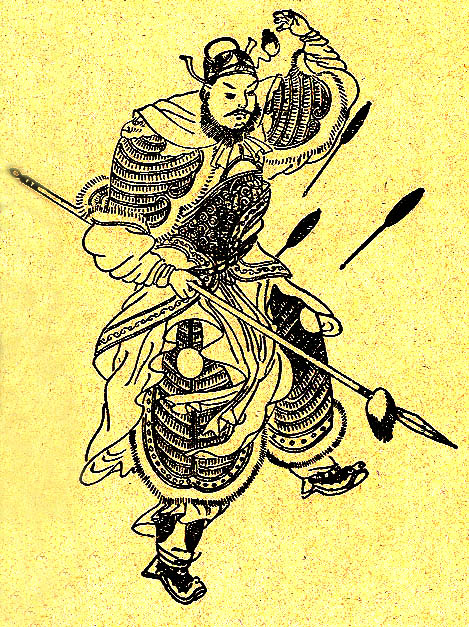
- A Qing dynasty illustration of Zhang He

General of Chariots and Cavalry Who Attacks the West (征西車騎將軍)
- In office 229 – July or August 231
- Monarch: Cao Rui

General of the Left (左將軍)
- In office 220 – 229
- Monarch: Cao Pi

General Who Defeats Bandits (盪寇將軍)
- In office 215 – 220
- Monarch: Emperor Xian of Han
- Chancellor: Cao Cao

General of the Household Who Brings Peace to the State (寧國中郎將) (under Yuan Shao)
- In office 199 – ?
- Monarch: Emperor Xian of Han

Personal details
- Born: Unknown Maozhou, Hebei
- Died: July or August 231 (Note: Liu Shan's biography in the Sanguozhi recorded that Zhang He died in the 6th month of the 9th year of the Jianxing era of Liu Shan's reign. This month corresponds to 17 July to 14 August 231 in the Gregorian calendar.) Qinzhou District, Tianshui, Gansu
- Children: Zhang Xiong; three other sons
- Occupation: General
- Courtesy name: Junyi (儁乂)
- Posthumous name: Marquis Zhuang (壯侯)
- Peerage: Marquis of Mao (鄚侯)

Zhang He (died July or August 231), courtesy name Junyi, was a military general serving under the warlord Cao Cao in the late Eastern Han dynasty of China. He continued serving in the state of Cao Wei under its first two rulers, Cao Pi and Cao Rui, during the Three Kingdoms period until his death.

Zhang He began his career under Han Fu, the governor of Ji Province, in the 180s when he joined the Han imperial forces in suppressing the Yellow Turban Rebellion. He became a subordinate of the warlord Yuan Shao in 191 after Yuan Shao seized the governorship of Ji Province from Han Fu. Throughout the 190s, Zhang He fought in the battles against Yuan Shao's northern rival, Gongsun Zan. In 200, Zhang He initially fought on Yuan Shao's side at the Battle of Guandu against Cao Cao, a warlord who controlled the Han central government. However, he defected to Cao Cao after Yuan Shao's defeat at Guandu in the same year. (Note: Two other accounts claimed that Zhang He defected to Cao Cao's side before Yuan Shao lost the Battle of Guandu. See #Defecting to Cao Cao's side.) Since then, he had fought in several wars under Cao Cao's banner, including the campaigns against Yuan Shao's heirs and allies (201–207), the expeditions in northwestern China (211–214), and the battles around Hanzhong (215–219). After Cao Cao's death in 220, Zhang He served in Wei and fought in battles against Wei's rival states, Shu Han and Eastern Wu. His best known victory was at the Battle of Jieting in 228, in which he defeated the Shu general Ma Su by cutting off the enemy's access to water supplies and then attacking them. In 231, he was killed in an ambush laid by Shu forces during the Battle of Mount Qi while he was reluctantly pursuing a retreating enemy force.

Chen Shou, who wrote the third-century historical text Sanguozhi, named Zhang He as one of the Five Elite Generals of his time, alongside Yu Jin, Yue Jin, Zhang Liao and Xu Huang.

== Service under Han Fu and Yuan Shao ==
Zhang He was from Mao County (鄚縣), Hejian State (河閒國), which is in present-day Maozhou, Hebei. Towards the end of the Eastern Han dynasty, when the Yellow Turban Rebellion broke out, he responded to the Han government's call for volunteers to serve in the army and help suppress the revolt. He was commissioned as a Major (司馬) and placed under the command of Han Fu, the Inspector of Ji Province (present-day southern Hebei).

In 191, after Han Fu relinquished his control of Ji Province to the warlord Yuan Shao, Zhang He came to serve Yuan Shao and was promoted to the rank of Colonel (校尉). Between 191 and 199, Zhang He fought on Yuan Shao's side in the war between Yuan Shao and his rival Gongsun Zan. In 199, after Yuan Shao had eliminated Gongsun Zan at the Battle of Yijing, Zhang He was further promoted to General of the Household Who Brings Peace to the State (寧國中郎將) for his achievements in battle.

== Battle of Guandu ==
In the year 200, Yuan Shao fought the Battle of Guandu with Cao Cao, a warlord who controlled the Han central government and the figurehead Emperor Xian. When Yuan Shao having a few advantages like a far larger army in the initial stages of the campaign, Zhang He suggested that he avoid direct confrontation with Cao Cao and instead send a light cavalry force south to attack the rear of Cao Cao's camp. Yuan Shao did not heed Zhang He's suggestion and attacked his foe's main force instead. In the first few battles of the campaign, Cao Cao's forces won several victories in which two of Yuan Shao's generals, Yan Liang and Wen Chou, were killed and no progress was made in overrunning Cao Cao's defenses.

=== Raid on Wuchao ===
Yuan Shao had sent his general Chunyu Qiong to guard his army's supply depot at Wuchao (烏巢; southeast of present-day Yanjin County, Henan). One night, Cao Cao led a raid on Wuchao to destroy Yuan Shao's supplies.

When news of the attack on Wuchao reached Yuan Shao's camp, Zhang He advised Yuan Shao: "Cao Cao's forces are well-trained so they will definitely defeat Chunyu Qiong. If Chunyu Qiong is defeated, all is lost for you, General. You should immediately dispatch forces to reinforce Wuchao." Yuan Shao's adviser Guo Tu disagreed with Zhang He: "Zhang He's idea isn't right. Why don't we attack Cao Cao's main camp instead? He will definitely head back to defend his camp. In this way, we can stop the attack on Wuchao without having to send reinforcements there." Zhang He replied: "Cao Cao's camp is well-defended and can't be conquered easily. If Chunyu Qiong is taken captive, we will all become prisoners-of-war."

Yuan Shao dispatched a detachment of light cavalry to reinforce Wuchao and sent heavily armed forces to attack Cao Cao's main camp. Cao Cao succeeded in destroying Yuan Shao's supplies at Wuchao, while his main camp successfully resisted Yuan Shao's attacks. Cao Cao scored an overall decisive victory over Yuan Shao in the battle.

=== Defecting to Cao Cao's side ===
Guo Tu felt embarrassed after seeing that his suggestion had resulted in Yuan Shao's defeat, so he attempted to divert attention away from himself by accusing Zhang He of displaying schadenfreude upon learning of their defeat. Zhang He became afraid when he heard about this, so he defected to Cao Cao's side.

Cao Cao was very pleased when Zhang He came to join him and he told Zhang He: "In the past, Wu Zixu failed to understand the situation and met his downfall. (Note: Wu Zixu was an official in the Wu state during the Spring and Autumn period. He foresaw that Wu would be defeated by the Yue state and attempted to warn King Fuchai, but was ignored. Fuchai eventually ordered him to commit suicide. What Cao Cao meant is: "If Wu Zixu had realised that he should no longer serve King Fuchai, he might not have met his downfall.") What if he had abandoned Yin like Weizi (Note: Weizi (微子) was a relative and adviser of King Zhou, the tyrannical last ruler of the Shang dynasty. He abandoned Shang and defected to the faction which eventually overthrew Shang and established the Zhou dynasty.) and defected to Han like Han Xin? (Note: Han Xin was a general who served under Liu Bang, the founding emperor of the Han dynasty. He initially served Liu Bang's rival Xiang Yu, but defected to Liu Bang's side later and assisted Liu Bang in defeating Xiang Yu and unifying China under Han rule.)"

The fifth-century historian Pei Songzhi pointed out a discrepancy between Zhang He's biography and the biographies of Cao Cao and Yuan Shao about the time when Zhang He defected to Cao Cao's side. According to Cao Cao's and Yuan Shao's biographies, Yuan Shao sent Zhang He and Gao Lan (高覽) to attack Cao Cao's main camp per Guo Tu's suggestion. They defected to Cao Cao when they learnt that Wuchao was lost, and their defection resulted in Yuan Shao's defeat. Based on these two accounts, Zhang He defected to Cao Cao before Yuan Shao's defeat at the Battle of Guandu. On the other hand, Zhang He's biography mentioned that Zhang He defected to Cao Cao after Yuan Shao's defeat at Guandu and after Guo Tu slandered him.

== Service under Cao Cao ==
After his defection, Zhang He was appointed by the Han imperial court (under Cao Cao's control) as a Lieutenant-General (偏將軍) and enfeoffed as a Marquis of a Chief Village (都亭侯). Between 200 and 207, he fought on Cao Cao's side against Yuan Shao's heirs and allies at the battles of Ye (204), Bohai (205) and Liucheng (207). He was promoted to General Who Pacifies the Di (平狄將軍) for his contributions.

In 206, Zhang He participated in the campaign against pirate forces led by Guan Cheng (管承) in Donglai Commandery (東萊郡; around present-day Yantai and Weihai, Shandong).

In 209, after the Battle of Red Cliffs, Chen Lan (陳蘭) and Mei Cheng (梅成) started a rebellion in Lu County (六縣; in present-day Lu'an, Anhui). Cao Cao ordered Zhang Liao to lead a force to suppress the revolt. Zhang He and Niu Gai (牛蓋) served as Zhang Liao's deputies and succeeded in eliminating the rebels.

=== Campaigns in northwestern China ===
In 211, Zhang He participated in the Battle of Weinan against a coalition of warlords from the Guanzhong region led by Ma Chao and Han Sui. The coalition broke up after Cao Cao defeated the warlords in the battle. Cao Cao sent Zhang He to lead a force to attack one of the warlords, Yang Qiu, at Anding Commandery (安定郡; covering parts of present-day Ningxia and Gansu), and Zhang succeeded in forcing Yang Qiu to surrender.

In 212, Zhang He accompanied Xiahou Yuan on a campaign against another of the warlords, Liang Xing (梁興), and the Di tribes in Wudu Commandery (武都郡; in present-day Longnan, Gansu). In 214, Xiahou Yuan and Zhang He defeated Ma Chao, who had borrowed troops from the warlord Zhang Lu in Hanzhong Commandery after being driven out of Guanzhong. They also eliminated rebel forces led by Song Jian (宋建).

=== Battles in Hanzhong ===
In 215, when Cao Cao launched a campaign against Zhang Lu in Hanzhong Commandery, he first sent Zhang He to lead an army ahead to attack Liang Xing (梁興) and the Di tribal king, Dou Mao (竇茂). He ordered Zhang He to lead 5,000 infantry to clear the path after entering Hanzhong via San Pass (散關; southwest of present-day Baoji, Shaanxi). After receiving Zhang Lu's surrender, Cao Cao headed back and left behind Xiahou Yuan, Zhang He and other generals to defend Hanzhong from his rival Liu Bei, who controlled Yi Province (covering present-day Sichuan and Chongqing) directly south of Hanzhong.

Later that year, Zhang He tried to relocate the residents of Ba to Hanzhong. He was defeated by Liu Bei's general Zhang Fei at Dangqu (宕渠; in present-day Qu County, Sichuan) and abandoned his horse and escaped on foot via a shortcut with only a few of his men. He retreated to Nanzheng County with his remaining troops. He was promoted to General Who Defeats Bandits (盪寇將軍) later.

In 218, Liu Bei launched a campaign to seize control of Hanzhong from Cao Cao's forces. He garrisoned his forces at Yangping Pass (陽平關; in present-day Ningqiang County, Shaanxi) while Zhang He stationed his troops at Guangshi (廣石). Liu Bei divided his thousands of elite soldiers into ten groups and ordered them to attack Zhang He's position at night. Zhang He personally led his men to resist Liu Bei's forces and succeeded in holding off the enemy. In the meantime, Liu Bei set fire to the fences at Zhang He's camp in Zouma Valley (走馬谷). Xiahou Yuan led some soldiers to put out the fire and encountered Liu Bei's force along the way and engaged the enemy. Xiahou Yuan was killed in action while Zhang He retreated. According to the Weilüe, Liu Bei was fearful that Xiahou Yuan would be replaced by Zhang He as the commander of Cao Cao's forces in Hanzhong. He also expressed disappointment after learning that it was Xiahou Yuan, and not Zhang He, who was killed in battle.

Cao Cao's forces in Hanzhong were shocked when they learnt of their commander's death and became worried that Liu Bei might take advantage of the situation to press on the attack. Guo Huai, a Major who served under Xiahou Yuan, expressed support for Zhang He to be the new commander. He said: "General Zhang (He) is a famous general in the Empire. Even Liu Bei is afraid of him. He is the only person capable of restoring stability in this hour of peril." Zhang He assumed the role and reorganised his forces. The other officers were all willing to submit to his command. Stability was restored.

Cao Cao, who was then in Chang'an, sent a messenger to Hanzhong to approve Zhang He's command. In the following year, he personally led an army to Hanzhong to reinforce Zhang He. Liu Bei ordered his forces to remain in their positions in the mountainous regions and refused to engage Cao Cao in battle. Cao Cao eventually gave up on Hanzhong and led his forces out. Zhang He was relocated to a garrison at Chencang (陳倉; present-day Chencang District, Baoji, Shaanxi).

== Service under Cao Pi ==
Cao Cao died in March 220 and was succeeded by his son Cao Pi as the King of Wei (魏王). Cao Pi promoted Zhang He to General of the Left (左將軍) and increased his marquis rank to Marquis of a Chief District (都鄉侯). Later that year, Cao Pi usurped the throne from Emperor Xian, ended the Eastern Han dynasty and established the state of Cao Wei with himself as the new emperor. After his coronation, he promoted Zhang He from a district marquis to a county marquis under the title "Marquis of Mao" (鄚侯).

In 221, Cao Pi ordered Zhang He and Cao Zhen to lead forces to attack the Lushuihu and Eastern Qiang tribes in Anding Commandery (安定郡; covering parts of present-day Ningxia and Gansu).

=== Battle of Jiangling ===
In 222, Cao Pi summoned Zhang He and Cao Zhen for an audience with him in the Wei capital Luoyang, and then ordered them, Xiahou Shang and other generals to lead armies to attack Jiangling County, which was controlled by Wei's rival state, Eastern Wu. During the battle, Zhang He supervised the Wei forces as they captured an island on the Yangtze River and started constructing a small castle on it. The battle had an inconclusive overall result because the Wei forces withdrew on their own without making any significant gains.

== Service under Cao Rui ==
Cao Pi died in 226 and was succeeded by his son Cao Rui as the emperor of Wei. Cao Rui ordered Zhang He to garrison in Jing Province to defend Wei's southern border from Eastern Wu. Later on, Zhang He and Sima Yi led troops to attack Wu forces commanded by Liu E (劉阿) and defeated them at Qikou (祁口).

=== Repelling the first Shu invasion ===
In 228, Zhuge Liang, the regent of Wei's rival state Shu Han, led the Shu forces on the first of a series of campaigns to attack Wei. Zhang He was recalled from Jing Province to defend Wei's western borders in the Guanzhong region (covering areas in present-day Gansu and Shaanxi) from the Shu armies. Later that year, he defeated the Shu general Ma Su at the Battle of Jieting by first cutting off the enemy's access to water supplies and then attacking them.

Earlier that year, three Wei-controlled commanderies – Nan'an (南安; in present-day Dingxi, Gansu), Tianshui and Anding (安定; covering parts of present-day Ningxia and Gansu) – had responded to Zhuge Liang's call and defected to Shu. Zhang He attacked the three commanderies and took them back for Wei. Cao Rui issued an imperial decree to praise Zhang He for his success in repelling the Shu invasion and reward him by adding 1,000 taxable households to his marquisate. Zhang He had 4,300 households in his marquisate after the increment.

=== Aborted campaign against Wu ===
Around the time, the Wei general Sima Yi, who was training naval forces in Jing Province, planned for an invasion of Wu via the Han River, which links to the Yangtze River. Cao Rui ordered Zhang He to lead forces from the Guanzhong region to Jing Province to support Sima Yi. However, when they arrived in Jing Province, it was already in winter and the waters were unsuitable for the larger ships to sail on, hence the campaign was aborted. Zhang He then returned to his garrison at Fangcheng County (方城縣; present-day Gu'an County, Hubei).

=== Predicting the outcome of the Siege of Chencang ===
In late 228, Zhuge Liang launched a second campaign against Wei and besieged the Wei fortress at Chencang (陳倉; present-day Chencang District, Baoji, Shaanxi), which was defended by Hao Zhao. Cao Rui summoned Zhang He back to the capital Luoyang to discuss plans to counter the Shu invasion but they met in Henan instead. Cao Rui placed Zhang He in command of 30,000 troops and reassigned some of the Imperial Guards to serve as Zhang's bodyguards. He asked Zhang He: "General, if you're late, will Zhuge Liang have already captured Chencang?"

Zhang He predicted that Zhuge Liang's forces could not maintain the siege on Chencang for long because they lacked supplies. He replied: "Zhuge Liang will have already left before I even reach Chencang. I estimate he has less than 10 days worth of supplies." He then led his troops towards Nanzheng County, travelling day and night. The Shu forces retreated. Cao Rui summoned Zhang He back to Luoyang and commissioned him as General of Chariots and Cavalry Who Attacks the West (征西車騎將軍).

=== Death ===
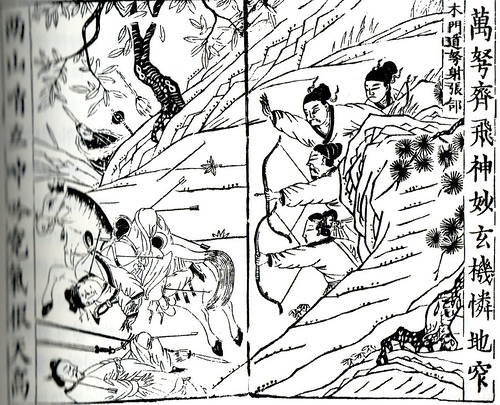
A Qing dynasty illustration of Zhang He's death.

In 231, when Zhuge Liang launched his fourth invasion of Wei, Cao Rui ordered Sima Yi and Zhang He to lead Wei forces west to counter the invasion. When Zhang He's army arrived in Lueyang County, Zhuge Liang retreated to Mount Qi (the mountainous regions around present-day Li County, Gansu) to defend his position. When Sima Yi ordered Zhang He to pursue the enemy, Zhang He refused and said that according to classical military doctrine, they should not pursue an enemy force returning to its base. Sima Yi insisted, so Zhang He had no choice but to pursue the retreating Shu forces. He fell into an ambush at Mumen Trail (木門道; near present-day Mumen Village, Mudan Town, Qinzhou District, Tianshui, Gansu) and died after a stray arrow hit him in the thigh. Cao Rui granted him the posthumous title "Marquis Zhuang" (壯侯), which literally means "robust marquis".

== Family ==
Zhang He had four sons, who were all enfeoffed as marquises by Cao Rui in recognition of their father's contributions to Wei. The eldest, Zhang Xiong (張雄), inherited his father's title and became the next Marquis of Mao (鄚侯). The youngest son, whose name is unknown, received the peerage of a Secondary Marquis (關內侯).

== Appraisal ==
Zhang He was described to be a resourceful and proficient military leader who was well versed in geography and capable of making accurate predictions about war situations, to the point where even Zhuge Liang was wary of him. Even though he served in the military, he highly respected Confucian scholars. He once recommended Bei Zhan (卑湛), a learned scholar who was known for his good moral conduct and who was from the same hometown as him, to serve in the Wei government. Cao Rui accepted Zhang He's suggestion and appointed Bei Zhan as an Academician (博士). He also issued an imperial decree to praise Zhang He for not only defending Wei's borders, but also showing concern for the internal preservation of Wei.

== In popular culture ==
Zhang He is a playable character in Koei's Dynasty Warriors and Warriors Orochi video game series. He also appears in all instalments of Koei's Romance of the Three Kingdoms strategy game series.

In the collectible card game Magic: The Gathering there is a card named "Zhang He, Wei General" in the Portal Three Kingdoms set.

He appears as a unique character in Total War: Three Kingdoms.

== See also ==
- Five Elite Generals
- Lists of people of the Three Kingdoms
