= Xun (surname) =

Xun (荀)
- Pronunciation: Xún (Mandarin)
- Language: Chinese

Origin
- Language: Old Chinese

Other names
- Variant form: Hsün

Xun ([ɕy̌n]) is the Mandarin pinyin romanization of the Chinese surname written 荀 as a Chinese character. It is romanized Hsün in Wade–Giles. Xun is the 201st surname in the Song dynasty classic text Hundred Family Surnames. It is not among the top 300 most common Chinese surnames.

== Notable people ==
- Xun Xi (荀息; died 651 BC), minister of Duke Wu of Jin, enfeoffed at Xun
- Xun Kuang or Master Xun (ca. 312–230 BC), ancient Confucian philosopher
- Xun Shuang (128–190), Eastern Han dynasty politician and historian
- Xun Chen (fl. 2nd century), Eastern Han dynasty advisor to warlord Han Fu
- Xun You (157–214), Eastern Han dynasty statesman and adviser to warlord Cao Cao
- Xun Yu (163–212), Eastern Han dynasty statesman and adviser to warlord Cao Cao
- Xun Yi (died 274), Jin dynasty politician
- Xun Can (c. 209–237), Three Kingdoms-era scholar and philosopher
- Xun Xu (died 289), Western Jin dynasty politician, artist and musician
- Xun Song (荀崧; 263–329), Jin dynasty official and governor, descendant of Xun Yu
- Xun Guan (303–?), Jin dynasty military commander, daughter of Xun Song
- Lady Xun (died 335), mother of Emperor Ming of Jin
- Xun Huisheng (1900–1968), Peking opera singer
