= Xun Shuang =

Chinese essayist, politician and writer (128–190)

- 荀爽

Minister of Works (司空)
- In office 189 – 190
- Monarch: Emperor Xian of Han
- Chancellor: Dong Zhuo

Minister of the Household (光祿勛)
- In office 189
- Monarch: Emperor Xian of Han
- Chancellor: Dong Zhuo

Chancellor of Pingyuan (平原相)
- In office 189
- Monarch: Emperor Xian of Han
- Chancellor: Dong Zhuo

Gentleman (郎中)
- In office 166
- Monarch: Emperor Huan of Han

Personal details
- Born: 128 Xuchang, Henan
- Died: c.July 190 (aged 62) Xi'an, Shaanxi
- Resting place: Xuchang, Henan
- Relations: See Xun family of Yingchuan
- Children: Xun Fei; Xun Cai
- Parent: Xun Shu (father)
- Occupation: Politician, writer
- Courtesy name: Ciming (慈明)
- Other name: Xun Xu (荀諝)

Xun Shuang (128 – c.July 190), courtesy name Ciming, was a Chinese essayist, politician, and writer who lived during the Eastern Han dynasty of China. Born in the influential Xun family of Yingchuan Commandery (around present-day Xuchang, Henan), Xun Shuang, for most of his life, distanced himself from politics because he perceived the political arena to be corrupt and dangerous. He repeatedly turned down offers to serve in the government, and spent his time producing numerous writings and giving lectures. However, in late 189, he was forced to join the civil service and became an official. Within a span of only 95 days, he rose through the ranks quickly from his initial status as a commoner to the highly prestigious office of Minister of Works (司空). Prior to that, within the 95 days, he had held the appointments of Chancellor of Pingyuan (平原相) and Minister of the Household (光祿勳). He died of illness in 190 while secretly making plans with Wang Yun, He Yong and others to eliminate the tyrannical warlord Dong Zhuo, who had hijacked and controlled the Han central government.

== Life ==
Xun Shuang's ancestral home was in Yingchuan Commandery (穎川郡; around present-day Xuchang, Henan). He was the sixth son of Xun Shu (荀淑; 83-149), an official who served as the Prefect (令) of Langling County (朗陵縣) and as the Chancellor (相) to the Marquis of Langling County. Xun Shu was also an 11th generation descendant of Xun Zi. Xun Shu had eight sons, who were nicknamed the "Eight Dragons of the Xun Family" (荀氏八龍).

Xun Shuang was fond of reading since childhood. He could fluently recite the Analects and Spring and Autumn Annals when he was just 11. The Grand Commandant (太尉), Du Qiao (杜喬), praised him and said he was worthy of becoming a teacher. As he was interested purely in scholarly pursuits, he distanced himself from politics by refusing to socialise with officials and turning down offers to serve in the government. The people in Yingchuan Commandery once said, "Among the Eight Dragons of the Xun Family, Ciming has no equal."

In 166, after Zhao Dian (趙典), the Minister of Ceremonies (太常), nominated him to join the civil service, Xun Shuang was appointed as a Gentleman (郎中; a low-level official). He wrote a long memorial to the imperial court, requesting that the government promote Confucianism, enforce Confucian rules of propriety more rigorously, lower taxes, and reduce an oversupply of maids in the imperial palace by freeing them and arranging for them to be married. He resigned after submitting his memorial.

Xun Shuang tried to persuade other officials to leave the political arena to avoid getting into trouble. In 167, Emperor Huan issued a general amnesty. Li Ying, an official who was imprisoned during the first Disaster of the Partisan Prohibitions in 166, was pardoned, released and reinstated as an official. Many officials wanted Li Ying to serve as Grand Commandant (太尉). However, Xun Shuang was worried that Li Ying would incur the jealousy of others due to his fame and popularity, so he wrote a letter to Li Ying to advise him to maintain a low profile to avoid trouble. (Note: Per Li Ying's biography in Houhanshu, Xun Shuang's father Xun Shu was one of the only two friends/mentors Li Ying had, the other being Chen Shi. In any case, Xun Shuang's efforts were in vain as Li Ying got himself into trouble when handling the Zhang Cheng case. Xun Shuang's cousin Xun Yu (荀昱) died together with Li Ying.)

During the second Disaster of the Partisan Prohibitions in 169, during the reign of Emperor Ling of Han, in order to evade the political turmoil, Xun Shuang first fled to the coastal regions and then headed south to the area near the mouth of the Han River (around present-day Wuhan, Hubei). He spent over ten years in southern China, where he produced numerous writings and gave lectures and earned himself a reputation as a highly learned Confucian scholar.

In 184, (Note: While the second Disaster of the Partisan Prohibitions was ended as a response to the Yellow Turban Rebellion, per Emperor Ling's biography in Houhanshu, Yuan Feng was sikong from c.November 178 (10th month of the 1st year of the Guang'he era; the month corresponds to 29 Oct to 27 Nov 178 in the Julian calendar) to c.May 179 (3rd month of the 2nd year of the Guanghe era; the month corresponds to 24 Apr to 23 May 179 in the Julian calendar).) after Emperor Ling lifted the restrictions on civil liberties and ended the second Disaster of the Partisan Prohibitions, Xun Shuang was again invited to serve in one of the top five offices in the government. Yuan Feng (袁逢; father of Yuan Shao and Yuan Shu), the Minister of Works, nominated Xun Shuang to join the civil service but Xun Shuang refused to become an official. When Yuan Feng died, Xun Shuang mourned him for three years and started a trend where officials would mourn the deaths of those who nominated them into office. Xun Shuang also criticised some popular practices which he deemed to be not in line with Confucian customs.

When the general He Jin came to power as regent in mid-189 after Emperor Ling's death, the imperial court sent a carriage to fetch Xun Shuang to the imperial capital, Luoyang, to serve as an official again. He Jin was worried that Xun Shuang would decline the offer, so he nominated Xun Shuang to the position of Palace Attendant. However, the nomination became void very soon because He Jin was assassinated not long later by the eunuch faction in the imperial court.

Shortly after He Jin's death, the warlord Dong Zhuo hijacked and seized control of the central government. In late 189, he replaced Emperor Shao with Emperor Xian, who was actually a puppet ruler under his control. After Emperor Xian's enthronement, Dong Zhuo issued an order to Xun Shuang to serve in the government. Xun Shuang tried to escape but failed, so he had no choice but to follow the order and serve as the Chancellor (相) of Pingyuan State (平原國). While en route to Pingyuan State, he passed by Wanling County (宛陵縣), where he was appointed Minister of the Household (光祿勛). Three days after he assumed office, he was promoted to Minister of Works (司空). Within a span of only 95 days, he had risen through the ranks quickly from a commoner to one of the most prestigious offices in the Han government.

While in office as Minister of Works, Xun Shuang tried to balance relations between Dong Zhuo and other officials. In 190, a coalition of regional officials and warlords started a campaign against Dong Zhuo in the name of rescuing Emperor Xian from being held hostage by Dong Zhuo. As Dong Zhuo prepared to evacuate Luoyang and move the imperial capital to Chang'an in the west, two officials Yang Biao (楊彪) and Huang Wan (黃琬) strongly objected to his decision and had a heated argument with him in the imperial court. Xun Shuang was worried that Dong Zhuo would execute Yang Biao and Huang Wan for opposing him, so he pretended to openly chide Yang Biao and Huang Wan in front of everyone by saying, "You think the Chancellor of State (Dong Zhuo) feels happy about having to do this? The coalition from the east can't be defeated in just one day. That's why we should move the capital elsewhere and wait for an opportunity to strike back. The situation now is similar to that of Qin and Han. (Note: Xun Shuang was referring to how the Guanzhong region, where the city of Chang'an was located, previously served as a solid foundation for the Qin state and the Han dynasty when they set out to conquer the rest of China.)" Dong Zhuo's anger subsided. Later, Xun Shuang privately told Yang Biao, "If you and the other excellencies continue to openly argue over such issues, you'll definitely get yourselves into trouble. That's why I choose to remain silent."

Although Xun Shuang followed Dong Zhuo to Chang'an and appeared to support him, he actually plotted to eliminate Dong Zhuo because he believed that Dong Zhuo's tyranny and cruelty would ruin the Han dynasty. He secretly contacted Wang Yun, He Yong and other officials to make plans to assassinate Dong Zhuo. However, he died of illness in 190 at the age of 62 before the plan materialised.

Around the late 190s, after Xun Shuang's nephew Xun Yu, was appointed acting Prefect of the Masters of Writing (尚書令), he had his uncle's remains transferred from Chang'an back to the Xun family's ancestral home in Yingchuan Commandery (穎川郡; around present-day Xuchang, Henan) for burial. He also arranged for He Yong to be buried beside Xun Shuang.

== Family ==
- Father: Xun Shu
- Elder brothers: Xun Jian; Xun Gun (荀緄)
- Daughter: Xun Cai
- Son: Xun Fei, grandfather of Xun Xu
- Nephews: Xun Yu, son of Xun Gun; Xun Yue, son of Xun Jian
- Cousin: Xun Tan (荀昙), grandfather of Xun You

== See also ==
- Lists of people of the Three Kingdoms
