= Xun =

Xun may refer to:

== China ==
Note: in Wade–Giles, Xun is romanized Hsün

- Xun (surname) (荀), Chinese surname
- Xun (instrument) (壎/塤/埙), Chinese vessel flute made of clay or ceramic
- Xun, Hequ County (巡镇), town in Hequ County, Shanxi, China
- Xun County (浚县), Henan, China

== Other ==
- Xun language (disambiguation), name of several southern African Khoisan languages

== See also ==
- ǃKung people, of southwestern Africa
- Xionites, also known as Hunni, once a people from Central Asia who spoke an Iranian language
