= Xun Can =

Chinese xuanxue philosopher (c. 209–237)

Xun Can 荀粲
- Born: c. 209
- Died: c. 237 (aged 28)
- Other name: Fengqian (奉倩)
- Occupation: Philosopher
- Spouse: Cao Hong's daughter
- Father: Xun Yu
- Relatives: See Xun family of Yingchuan

Xun Can (c. 209–237), courtesy name Fengqian, was a Chinese xuanxue philosopher of the state of Cao Wei in the Three Kingdoms period of China. He was a son of Xun Yu.

== Family background ==
Xun Can's ancestral home was in Yingchuan Commandery (穎川郡; around present-day Xuchang, Henan). He was born in the influential Xun family as a son of Xun Yu, a prominent statesman of the late Eastern Han dynasty and an adviser to the warlord Cao Cao; one of his third cousins was Xun You. His exact birth order among his siblings is not clear; it is only known that he was younger than Xun Yu's sixth son, Xun Yi.

== Views on human understanding of reality ==
Xun Can was markedly different from the rest of his brothers; he enjoyed studying and discussing Taoism as opposed to his brothers' preference for Confucianism. He believed that when Zigong talked about how sages came to understand human nature and divine order, he was referring to a particular higher state of mind that these sages had attained, and that state of mind cannot be expressed in any way. In his opinion, even though the past sages had written books such as the six Confucian classics, these books are actually the "leftovers" from the sages' journeys towards that higher state of mind rather than an expression of that state of mind itself. Xun Yu (荀俁), one of Xun Can's elder brothers, rebutted him, "The Yi Zhuan (易傳) says the sages created images to make sense of reality. They used words to express and describe their understanding of reality. How can you say that human understanding cannot be expressed in any way?"

Xun Can replied,

"The intricacies of human understanding are too complex to be expressed in the forms of images and words. You can use images to make sense of reality, but you can't use them to make sense of the deeper meanings beyond reality. You can use words to express your understanding of reality, but you can't use them to express what is beyond reality. We thus see that the intricacies of human understanding include not only what is expressed through images and words, but also what is beyond such things. Even though you may fully express in images and words what you understand about reality, you can't use them to express what is beyond reality. This means that the intricacies of human understanding not only cannot be fully expressed through images and words, but also cannot be easily understood."

Even the most skilled debaters at the time were unable to counter his argument.

== Views on Xun Yu and Xun You ==
Xun Can had another debate with his brothers about their father Xun Yu and their third cousin Xun You. In his opinion, his father focused on maintaining his image as a morally virtuous and upright man who assumed the moral high ground, whereas his third cousin was not concerned about his external image and was careful about maintaining a low profile and keeping to himself. His brothers were angry with him for describing Xun You in more favourable terms, but they could not refute him.

== Friendships with Fu Gu and Xiahou Xuan ==
In the early Taihe era (227–233) of Cao Rui's reign, Xun Can travelled to the imperial capital Luoyang to meet Fu Gu and have a discussion with him. Fu Gu focused on concrete details while Xun Can focused on abstract things, hence they could not understand each other and ended up in a heated quarrel. Pei Hui (裴徽), the Inspector of Ji Province, stepped in to mediate and successfully helped them resolve their misunderstandings. Xun Can and Fu Gu developed a close friendship after that.

Xun Can was also close friends with Xiahou Xuan. He once told Fu Gu and Xiahou Xuan, "The two of you will become more famous than me, but not as wise as me." Fu Gu retorted, "A famous person should also be a wise person. How can there be people who gain more than they are worth?" Xun Can replied, "A person becomes famous as a reward for being ambitious. However, ambition is a quality on its own and isn't necessarily linked to wisdom. I can also become famous like you, but I might not do so in the same way as you."

== Marriage and death ==
Xun Can assessed women in terms of their beauty and appearance rather than their talent and intelligence. He married the general Cao Hong's daughter, who was known for her pretty looks. At their wedding, they were dressed in extravagant garments and had expensive decorations for their bedroom. Xun Can treated his wife with special care and devotion. However, their romance did not last long as she died of illness a few years later. Fu Gu went to comfort Xun Can at his wife's funeral and saw that he was extremely grieved even though he did not shed tears. Fu Gu told him, "It's difficult to find a wife who has both looks and talents. However, you prefer looks over talents, so it's not too hard to find a new wife. What's there to feel sad about?" Xun Can replied, "It's difficult to find another beautiful woman like her again! Even though she may not have had the most beautiful looks, it wasn't easy for me to have found someone like her." He was so deeply upset over his wife's death that he died a few years later at the age of 28.

Contemporary accounts suggest that Xun Can associated primarily with the leading talents of his age rather than with a wider social circle.Although only around ten people attended his funeral, all were notable members of the scholar-gentry.

== Yuan Can's name change ==
The Liu Song dynasty official Yuan Can admired Xun Can so much that he changed his given name from "Minsun" (愍孫) to "Can" (粲). He also adopted the courtesy name "Jingqian" (景倩), which was also the courtesy name of Xun Can's brother Xun Yi.

== See also ==
- Lists of people of the Three Kingdoms
