= Chen Ji (Yuanfang) =

Eastern Han official and scholar (129–199)

- 陳紀

Minister Herald (大鴻臚)
- In office 196 – 199
- Monarch: Emperor Xian of Han

Chancellor of Pingyuan (平原相)
- In office 190 – ?
- Monarch: Emperor Xian of Han

Palace Attendant (侍中)
- In office 189 – 190
- Monarch: Emperor Xian of Han

General of the Household for All Purposes (五官中郎將)
- In office 189 – 189
- Monarch: Emperor Xian of Han

Personal details
- Born: 129 Xuchang, Henan
- Died: 199 (aged 70)
- Children: Chen Qun
- Parent: Chen Shi (father)
- Occupation: Official, scholar
- Courtesy name: Yuanfang (元方)

Chen Ji (129 – c.July 199), courtesy name Yuanfang, was an official and scholar who lived during the Eastern Han dynasty of China.

== Life ==
Chen Ji was from Xu County (許縣), Yingchuan Commandery (潁川郡), which is present-day Xuchang, Henan. His father Chen Shi was a notable official who served from the reign of Emperor Huan (r. 146–168) well into the early reign of Emperor Ling (r. 168–189).

Due to the Disasters of the Partisan Prohibitions in 166 and 169, Chen Ji did not enter government service and instead spent his time reading and writing. In 184, when the Yellow Turban Rebellion broke out, Emperor Ling issued a general amnesty to everyone affected by the Disasters of the Partisan Prohibitions. Chen Ji then received invitations from the four highest-ranked officials in the central government – General-in-Chief, Minister Over the Masses, Minister of Works and Grand Commandant – to join their administrative staff. However, he declined all of them.

In 189, the warlord Dong Zhuo took advantage of the political chaos in the aftermath of Emperor Ling's death to lead his troops into the imperial capital Luoyang and seize control of the central government. He also deposed Emperor Shao and replaced him with Emperor Xian, who remained a figurehead ruler under his control. Dong Zhuo then sent an invitation to Chen Ji, requesting him to come to Luoyang to serve as General of the Household for All Purposes (五官中郎將). Fearing that he would be killed if he refused, Chen Ji accepted the invitation. He was later reassigned to be a Palace Attendant (侍中).

In 190, Dong Zhuo appointed Chen Ji as the Chancellor (相) of Pingyuan State (平原國). Before Chen Ji left to assume his new office, Dong Zhuo sought his opinion on relocating the imperial capital from Luoyang to Chang'an, in the light of an invasion by a coalition of warlords from the east of Hangu Pass. Chen Ji objected to this idea. Dong Zhuo was very displeased but he did not harm Chen Ji because of Chen Ji's high standing in the imperial court. Some officials suggested appointing Chen Ji as Minister Over the Masses. When Chen Ji heard about it, he quickly left Luoyang for Pingyuan State to avoid getting caught up in politics.

In 196, when Emperor Xian appointed Yuan Shao as Grand Commandant, Yuan Shao refused to accept the appointment because Grand Commandant ranked lower than General-in-Chief, the appointment held by his rival Cao Cao. Yuan Shao then offered the appointment of Grand Commandant to Chen Ji instead, but Chen Ji declined. Emperor Xian then appointed Chen Ji as Minister Herald (大鴻臚). Chen Ji died in office in 199 at the age of 71 (by East Asian age reckoning). His son, Chen Qun, served in the Han central government under the premiership of the warlord Cao Cao throughout the final years of the Eastern Han dynasty and later served in the Cao Wei state during the Three Kingdoms period.

== See also ==
- Lists of people of the Three Kingdoms
