= Xun Chen =

Late 2nd century Chinese advisor to warlord Han Fu

- 荀諶

Personal details
- Born: Unknown
- Died: Unknown
- Relations: See Xun family of Yingchuan
- Children: Xun Hong
- Parent: Xun Gun (father)
- Occupation: Official
- Courtesy name: Youruo (友若)

Xun Chen (fl.190-200), courtesy name Youruo, was an official who lived during the late Eastern Han dynasty of China. Born in the influential Xun family of Yingchuan Commandery (around present-day Xuchang, Henan), he was the fourth brother of Xun Yu and a second cousins once removed of Xun You. He initially served as an adviser to the warlord Han Fu and later to another warlord, Yuan Shao.

== Life ==
Xun Chen's ancestral home was in Yingyin County (潁陰縣), Yingchuan Commandery (穎川郡), which is in present-day Xuchang, Henan. He was born in the influential Xun family as the fourth son of Xun Gun (荀緄), who served as the Chancellor (相) of the Jinan State (濟南國) under the Han government.

Xun Chen served as an adviser to the warlord Han Fu, who was the Governor (牧) of Ji Province. In 191, the warlord Yuan Shao, acting on advice from Pang Ji, secretly contacted another warlord Gongsun Zan to form an alliance to attack Ji Province and agreed to divide Han Fu's territories between them. Gongsun Zan then attacked Han Fu and defeated him in battle. Yuan Shao then sent his nephew Gao Gan to meet Han Fu's close aides, including Xin Ping, Xun Chen and Guo Tu, to persuade Han Fu to hand over Ji Province to him to prevent the province from falling into Gongsun Zan's hands. Xun Chen and the others successfully convinced Han Fu to cede control of Ji Province to Yuan Shao, by assuring him that Ji Province would be better in Yuan Shao's hands and that Han Fu himself would remain safe after giving up his governorship. Xun Chen, along with other former subordinates of Han Fu, then joined Yuan Shao and became one of his advisers.

In 199, after Yuan Shao defeated Gongsun Zan at the Battle of Yijing and took over his territories, he planned to launch a campaign against the warlord Cao Cao, who controlled the figurehead Han emperor, Emperor Xian, and the Han central government. He put his eldest son Yuan Tan in charge of Qing Province, second son Yuan Xi in charge of You Province, nephew Gao Gan in charge of Bing Province, and started mobilising troops from his territories in preparation for the campaign. Xun Chen served as a strategist in Yuan Shao's camp during the Battle of Guandu.

Xun Chen's eventual fate is not recorded in history.

== See also ==
- Lists of people of the Three Kingdoms
