= Wen Chou =

General serving warlord Yuan Shao (died 200)

Wen Chou 文醜
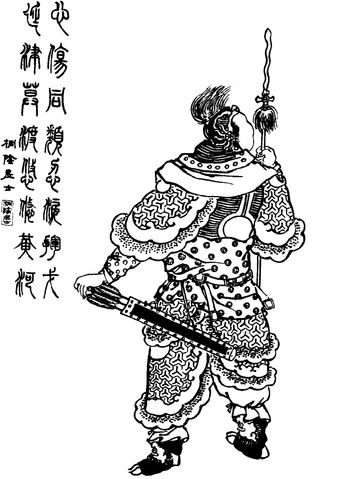
- A Qing dynasty illustration of Wen Chou
- Born: Unknown
- Died: 200; Yan Ford (延津; north of present-day Yanjin County, Henan)
- Occupation: Military General

Wen Chou
- Traditional Chinese: 文醜
- Simplified Chinese: 文丑
Transcriptions
Standard Mandarin
- Hanyu Pinyin: Wén Chǒu
- Wade–Giles: Wen Ch'ou

Wen Chou (died 200) was a military general serving under the warlord Yuan Shao during the late Eastern Han dynasty of China. His force was defeated by that of rival warlord Cao Cao in the Battle of Yan Ford and he was killed in the midst of battle.

== Life ==
Historical records pertaining to Wen Chou are scarce. References to him could be found in the Records of the Three Kingdoms in the biographies of Yuan Shao, Cao Cao, Xun Yu and Xun You, from where it could be gathered that Wen Chou was a fierce warrior whose prowess in battle matched that of his counterpart, Yan Liang.

In 200, after Yan Liang was killed in the Battle of Boma, Yuan Shao brought his main army south of the Yellow River and launched a full-fledged attack on Cao Cao. Wen Chou and Liu Bei were sent forth with a vanguard force of more than 5,000 riders to pursue Cao Cao's retreating forces. Making a stand atop a knoll, Cao Cao retained less than 600 cavalry and let loose the remaining horses.

As Wen Chou's troops arrived, many broke ranks to loot the horses and other supplies. Cao Cao then gave order for a counterattack. The small but elite cavalry force scored a brilliant victory over the disorganised enemy and killed Wen Chou in battle. In the official records, Wen Chou died in battle to unknown assailants, but secondary sources written after the period attribute Guan Yu as the one who slayed Wen Chou.

== In Romance of the Three Kingdoms ==
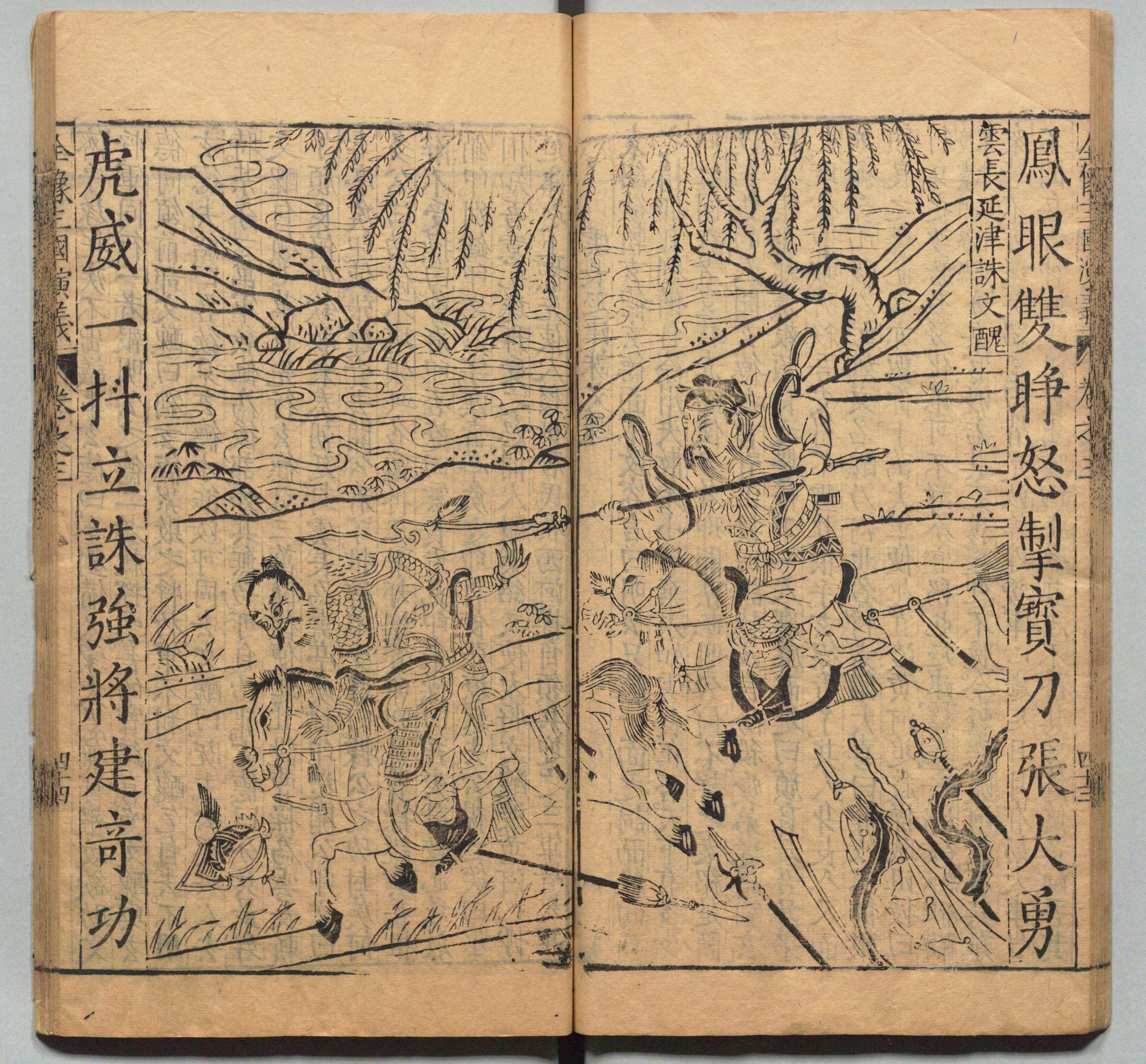
Ming dynasty woodblock print of Wen Chou slain by Guan Yu.

In the 14th-century historical novel Romance of the Three Kingdoms, Wen Chou is said to have a face like that of the xiezhi. (Note: The xiezhi (獬豸) is a legendary beast which supposedly looks hideous.) In Chapter 5, Yuan Shao praises Wen Chou's prowess in battle when he laments, while under attack by Hua Xiong, that "If I had either Yan Liang or Wen Chou here, I would have nothing to fear."

This comment foreshadows the appearance of Wen Chou in chapter 26, where he volunteers to avenge his close friend Yan Liang, who is killed in the Battle of Boma by Guan Yu. Given 70,000 troops, Wen Chou crosses the Yellow River and heads straight towards Cao Cao's camp. In an unusual move, Cao Cao turns his entire formation around, placing the supplies in front. While Wen Chou's soldiers are busy looting the supplies, Cao Cao directs his men south onto a knoll, from where they allow their horses to graze. Wen Chou's soldiers pounce upon the horses as they approach the knoll and become disorganised. Cao Cao then gives the order for a counterattack, forcing the enemy to retreat.

Zhang Liao and Xu Huang, two of Cao Cao's best generals, give chase. Wen Chou fires two arrows from atop his horse, one of which slices off the feather on Zhang Liao's helmet and the other hits his horse in the face. Brandishing his poleaxe, Xu Huang charges towards Wen Chou but has to retreat when a band of enemy soldiers come to their commander's rescue.

Leading a dozen riders, Guan Yu then cuts off Wen Chou's escape and engaged him in a duel. Within three bouts, Wen Chou withdraws and attempts to evade. However, Guan Yu's horse, the Red Hare, is of a superior breed and soon catches up with him. Guan Yu then kills Wen Chou from behind.

== See also ==
- Lists of people of the Three Kingdoms
