= Xun Yi =

Cao Wei and Jin dynasty official (died 274)

- 荀顗

Grand Tutor to the Crown Prince (太子太傅) (acting)
- In office 266 – 274
- Monarch: Emperor Wu of Jin

Grand Marshal (太尉)
- In office 266 – 274
- Monarch: Emperor Wu of Jin

Minister over the Masses (司徒)
- In office 266
- Monarch: Emperor Wu of Jin

Minister of Works (司空)
- In office 30 April 264 – 265
- Monarch: Cao Huan
- Preceded by: Wang Xiang

Personal details
- Born: early 200s (Note: While Xun Yi's birth year is not recorded, his biography in Book of Jin indicated that he was more than 60 when his mother died. According to the chronology of the biography, this incident took place before the fall of Shu (late 263). Therefore, Xun Yi's birth year should be in the early 200s. Volume 16 of Zhengao indicated that he was 70 (by East Asian reckoning) when he died. If correct, his birth year should be 205.)
- Died: 19 June 274
- Spouse: Unknown
- Parent: Xun Yu (father)
- Occupation: Politician
- Courtesy name: Jingqian (景倩)
- Posthumous name: Duke Kang (康公)
- Peerage: Duke of Linhuai (臨淮公)

Xun Yi (Note: not to be confused with his nephew who has a similar sounding name (荀霬), and was the husband of Princess Nanyang, a daughter of Sima Yi.) (early 200s - 19 June 274), courtesy name Jingqian, was a Chinese politician of the state of Cao Wei in the Three Kingdoms period of China. After the fall of Wei, he continued serving under the Jin dynasty, which replaced Wei in February 266. He was the sixth son of Xun Yu.

== Family background and early life ==
Xun Yi's ancestral home was in Yingchuan Commandery (穎川郡; around present-day Xuchang, Henan). He was born in the influential Xun family as the sixth son of Xun Yu, a prominent statesman of the late Eastern Han dynasty and an adviser to the warlord Cao Cao; one of his third cousins was Xun You. Also, one of his second cousins was Xun Xi (荀肸; father of Xun Xu). When he was still young, his brother-in-law Chen Qun (who married an elder sister of his) already regarded him highly. Before he reached adolescence, he was already known for his filial piety, and for being knowledgeable, insightful and meticulous.

== Service in Cao Wei ==
Due to his father's past contributions, Xun Yi was given an appointment as a Palace Gentleman (中郎) in the state of Cao Wei. When Sima Yi was the regent of Wei, he felt that Xun Yi was a rare talent and once remarked, "Lord Prefect Xun's son is comparable to Yaoqing's son Yuan Kan (袁侃)." Xun Yi was later promoted to a Mounted Gentleman (散騎侍郎) and then to a Palace Attendant (侍中).

Xun Yi was a tutor to the third Wei emperor, Cao Fang. He was also commissioned as a Cavalry Commandant (騎都尉) and awarded the title of a Secondary Marquis (關內侯). He studied the Yijing with Zhong Hui and had philosophical debates with Sima Jun on the Confucian values ren and xiao.

When the regent Cao Shuang was in power from 239 to 249, the official He Yan and others wanted to harm Fu Jia, but Xun Yi saved him. After the regent Sima Shi deposed Cao Fang and replaced him with Cao Mao as the emperor of Wei in 254, Xun Yi advised Sima to use the opportunity to announce the new emperor and see how his potential political rivals would react. In the same year, the generals Guanqiu Jian and Wen Qin, who opposed Sima Shi's act of changing the emperor, started a rebellion in Shouchun (壽春; around present-day Shou County, Anhui). Xun Yi assisted Sima Shi in suppressing the rebellion. As a reward for his efforts, he was enfeoffed as the Marquis of Wansui Village (萬歲亭侯) and given 400 taxable households to form his marquisate.

Following Sima Shi's death in 255, his younger brother Sima Zhao became the new regent. Xun Yi was promoted to a Master of Writing (尚書). Between 257 and 258, when Sima Zhao was on a campaign to suppress a rebellion by Zhuge Dan, he left Xun Yi behind to guard the imperial capital Luoyang in his absence. In 260, after his maternal nephew Chen Tai died, Xun Yi replaced him as a Supervisor (僕射) and took charge of the Ministry of Personnel. After he took over the ministry, he implemented more stringent practices to ensure that officials were carefully selected and appointed. During the Xianxi era (264-265) in the reign of the last Wei emperor Cao Huan, Xun Yi served as Minister of Works and was promoted from a village marquis to a district marquis.

Xun Yi was known for his filial piety, which he maintained even when he was already in his 60s. When his mother died, he left office to perform filial mourning and displayed such deep sorrow over her death that he earned praise from his contemporaries for his filial piety. Sima Zhao also provided escorts for Xun Yi when he travelled around. In 265, after the Cao Wei state conquered one of its rival states, Shu Han, it wanted to restore the five-tiered nobility hierarchy system so it put Xun Yi in charge of the process. Xun Yi proposed to the Wei imperial court to allow Yang Hu, Ren Kai (任愷), Geng Jun (庚峻), Ying Zhen (應貞) and Kong Hao (孔顥) to assist him, and they collectively drafted a set of rules governing imperial protocol and etiquette. Xun Yi was also promoted from a district marquis to a county marquis under the title "Marquis of Linhuai" (臨淮侯).

== Service under the Jin dynasty ==
Xun Yi continued serving under the government of the Jin dynasty, which replaced the state of Cao Wei in February 266. After Sima Yan (Emperor Wu) was enthroned as the first Jin emperor, he promoted Xun Yi from a county marquis to a duke under the title "Duke of Linhuai" (臨淮公), with 1,800 taxable households in his dukedom. Emperor Wu also appointed Xun Yi as Minister over the Masses. Later, Xun Yi was concurrently appointed as a Palace Attendant and promoted to Grand Marshal (太尉), putting him in charge of military affairs and in command of 100 of the emperor's close guards. Shortly after, Xun Yi was given an additional appointment as acting Grand Tutor to the Crown Prince (太子太傅).

Xun Yi died in 274 during the Taishi era (265–274) of Emperor Wu's reign. Before his death, he had been tasked with arranging the music for two dance pieces, Zhengde (正德) and Dayu (大豫). Emperor Wu held a grand state funeral for Xun Yi and ordered the crown prince Sima Zhong to pay respects at the funeral. He also honoured Xun Yi with the posthumous name "Kang" (康), hence Xun Yi was formally known as "Duke Kang of Linhuai" (臨淮康公). Xun Yi's family members were given two million coins to build a house because Xun Yi and his family had no fixed residence when he was still living. In the early Xianning era (275–280) of Emperor Wu's reign, the emperor issued an imperial edict to honour his subjects who had rendered meritorious service. Xun Yi, as one of those subjects named in the edict, was enshrined in the imperial ancestral temple.

Xun Yi was very familiar with the rules of decorum and propriety, having read and known by heart the contents of books such as Etiquette and Ceremonial, Book of Rites and Rites of Zhou. Although his moral character was considered generally good, it was nonetheless tarnished by his obsequious behaviour towards, and association with, Jia Chong and Xun Xu (荀勗). When it was time for the crown prince Sima Zhong to marry, Xun Yi nominated Jia Nanfeng, Jia Chong's daughter to be the prince's consort. He was scorned by others for doing that.

== Succession ==
Xun Yi had no son when he died so he had no one to inherit his peerage and dukedom. Sometime in the late 380s, Xun Xu (荀序), a great-great-grandnephew of Xun Yi, inherited the peerage as the "Duke of Linhuai". After Xun Xu's death, Emperor Xiaowu (r. 372–396) designated Xun Xu's son, Xun Heng (荀恆), as the new Duke of Linhuai. The peerage was later passed on to Xun Heng's son, Xun Longfu (荀龍符), and finally abolished in 420 when Liu Yu ended the Jin dynasty and founded the Liu Song dynasty.

== See also ==
- Lists of people of the Three Kingdoms
