= Battle of Yan Province =

Battles fought between warlords Cao Cao and Lü Bu (194-195)

- Part of the wars at the end of the Han dynasty
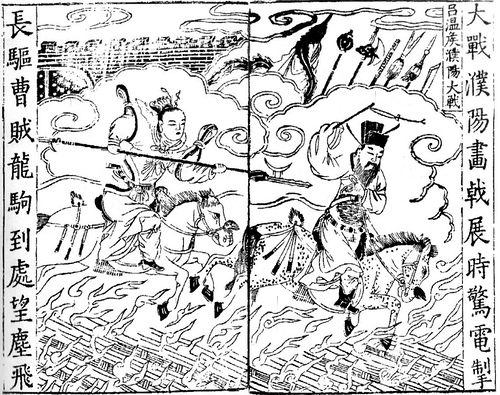
- Lü Bu defeats Cao Cao in Puyang, Romance of the Three Kingdoms illustration
Date	194–195 CE
Location	Yan Province (covering present-day southwestern Shandong and eastern Henan) 34°05′20″N 113°40′10″E
Result	Victory for Cao Cao, Lü Bu retreats

Belligerents
Cao Cao	Lü Bu

Commanders and leaders
Cao Cao; Xun Yu; Cheng Yu; Dian Wei; Cao Ren	Lü Bu; Chen Gong; Zhang Miao †

Strength
	over 10,000
- Location within China

Battle of Yan Province
- Traditional Chinese: 兗州之戰
- Simplified Chinese: 兖州之战
Transcriptions
Standard Mandarin
- Hanyu Pinyin: Yǎnzhōu Zhī Zhàn

The Battle of Yan Province was fought between the warlords Cao Cao and Lü Bu for control of Yan Province (covering present-day southwestern Shandong and eastern Henan) in the late Eastern Han dynasty. The battle lasted for at least one hundred days with an indecisive conclusion.

== Background ==
In 192, remnants of the Yellow Turban rebels from Qing Province invaded Yan Province and occupied Dongping and Rencheng. Liu Dai, Inspector of Yan Province, wanted to attack the rebels but Bao Xin, Chancellor of Jibei, advised him against it. Liu Dai ignored Bao Xin's warning, engaged the rebels in battle, and was eventually defeated and killed.

At that time, Cao Cao's advisor Chen Gong urged him to take control of Yan Province and secure it as a base for conquering other territories. Chen Gong volunteered to persuade Liu Dai's followers to join Cao Cao. Bao Xin, who was friendly towards Cao Cao, travelled to Dong Commandery (southwest of present-day Puyang, Henan) to invite Cao to be the new Inspector of Yan Province.

Cao Cao then attacked the Yellow Turban rebels at Shouzhang but failed to defeat them. After that, Cao Cao reformed his army, enforced military rules more strictly, and used incentives to encourage his men. He recognized that the rebels did not have a stable flow of supplies, as they relied on plundering to sustain themselves. Hence, Cao Cao launched surprise attacks on the rebels, prevented them from pillaging, and achieving ultimate victory and forcing the rebels to retreat north. Cao Cao pursued the rebels and defeated them again at Jibei (south of present-day Changqing District, Shandong). The rebels, numbering more than 300,000, including 100,000 civilians, surrendered to Cao Cao. Cao reorganized the surrendered troops to form the Qingzhou Corps (青州兵), while implementing the tuntian system for the people to provide for themselves and the military.

In 193, Cao Cao's father Cao Song was killed by Zhang Kai (張闓), a subordinate of Tao Qian, Governor of Xu Province. In retaliation, Cao Cao launched an attack on Tao Qian, sweeping through Tao's lands and slaughtering thousands of Xu Province's population, including civilians. Tao Qian retreated to Tancheng (郯城), where Cao Cao was unable to conquer the city and retreated after his army was running low on supplies.

The following year, Cao Cao attacked Tao Qian again, conquering many counties in Langya and Donghai commanderies of Xu Province. Just then, Cao Cao's subordinates Zhang Miao and Chen Gong rebelled against him and aided Lü Bu in taking over his home base of Yan Province. Cao Cao then decided to abandon his campaign on Tao Qian and turn back to retake Yan Province.

== Before Cao Cao's return ==
Zhang Miao, who had been a friend of both Cao Cao and Yuan Shao in his youth, had been falling out with Cao Cao over the last year. While fleeing from Yuan Shao in the north, Lü Bu crossed though Chenliu, which Zhang Miao was the Grand Administrator of, and was allowed by him to stay there for a time before going to join Zhang Yang in Henei. This along with how he had started to criticize Yuan Shao's behavior made it where Yuan Shao wanted to kill Zhang Miao. Cao Cao sheltered Zhang Miao, but Miao always feared that Cao Cao would turn on him and kill him in order to appease his nominal superior. At some point, Chen Gong learned of Zhang Miao's growing distrust and sought to use this. It seems that from how Cao Cao favored other officers that Chen Gong felt his talents were being overlooked and he decided to revolt. He met with Zhang Miao and discussed rebellion to which Zhang Miao was persuaded to turn against Cao Cao, so they took up arms against their absent leader at Chenliu. Because Zhang Miao and Lü Bu were on good terms, Zhang Miao invited Lü Bu to bring his army to aid them and become the new Governor. After Lü Bu agreed, Chen Gong then took the soldiers he had been given to patrol Dong and joined Lü Bu.

When Lü Bu arrived in Chenliu, Zhang Miao sent a man named Liu Yi to Juancheng to try and trick Xun Yu, who was in charge of the defenses there. He claimed that Lü Bu had brought reinforcements for the campaign against Tao Qian and asked Xun Yu to prepare provisions for the army. Xun Yu did not fall for this and realized that Zhang Miao was planning to revolt. He prepared defenses for the city and sent a letter to Xiahou Dun in Puyang, asking him to bring reinforcements to Juancheng in order to defend it. This was particularly important as Cao Cao's family was in the city. After receiving this letter, Xiahou Dun marched from Puyang immediately.

Lü Bu sought to attack Xiahou Dun before he could arrive at Puyang, however when the forces fought, Xiahou Dun's troops won and forced Lü Bu to pull back. Still, Xiahou Dun's departure left Puyang lightly defended, and he was easily able to seize the city. Many local leaders in Yan now felt that Lü Bu would seize the province, so they defected to him. Only the counties of Juancheng, Dong'a, and Fan remained loyal to Cao Cao, so Lü Bu's first priority was to attack them. He personally led the army against Xun Yu and Xiahou Dun at Juancheng, while Chen Gong attacked Dong'a. Another commander, Fan Yi, attacked Fan.

Cao Cao's officer Cheng Yu went to Fan and Dong'a to rally the defenders. The loyalists at Fan were successful in killing Fan Yi, and Lü Bu himself was defeated at Juancheng, so he went west and garrisoned Puyang. Cheng Yu personally commanded the defense of Dong'a and brought a cavalry force to meet Chen Gong at Cangting Ford. Cheng Yu was able to hold the line there and prevent Chen Gong from crossing the river, so Dong'a was defended.

== Cao Cao's return ==
Cao Cao soon returned from Xu to fight Lü Bu. The general Cao Ren, quickly retook the base of Gouyang as Cao Hong attacked and retook the area of Dongping, making it easier for Cao Cao's forces to reestablish a base in Yan.

Cao Cao and Lü Bu's forces were locked in a stalemate for at least a hundred days, with Cao on the disadvantageous end. Eventually, Lü Bu abandoned his position because of an outbreak of famine. Cao Cao then laid siege to Lü Bu at Juye, Puyang. Xun Yu and Cheng Yu kept up the defense of the cities of Juancheng, Fan and Dong'e, but this still left only two counties with solid defenses, so Cao Cao led his army back.

Lü Bu sortied out with his cavalry and charged Cao Cao's Qingzhou Corps. The Qingzhou Corps fled in terror and Cao's formations fell into disarray. Seeing the confusion, Cao Cao quickly galloped ahead, but when a fire broke out he fell from his horse and burnt the palm of his left hand. Cao's army halted before they reached camp because most of the generals had not seen their lord and feared for his safety. Cao Cao then strained himself to rouse his men, ordering that siege weapons be prepared immediately so that they can besiege Lü Bu again.

When Cao Cao later surrounded Lü Bu at Puyang, the influential Tian clan, who were initially on Lü's side, switched allegiance to Cao and allowed his forces to enter the city. Cao Cao set fire to the eastern gate as a sign that he had no intention of reversing course, thereupon he came under attack and was defeated. Some of Lü Bu's horsemen captured Cao Cao but were unaware of his identity. Cao Cao saw a man riding on a yellow horse and lied that the man was him, so Lü Bu's horsemen released him and chased the rider. Cao Cao then dashed through the burning eastern gate and escaped from Puyang.

Thinking Cao Cao would attack him again soon, Lü Bu re-stationed his forces to the east at Shanyang.

By the fourth month of 195, raids by both sides had mostly seen Cao Cao's forces retake small bits of land, but victory was still not in sight. Soon learning that Cao Cao was camped at Shengshi while he was at the nearby area of Dongmin, Lü Bu thought this was a good time to attack him. In the summer, Lü Bu advanced to attack Cao Cao and he was joined by Chen Gong’s forces during the march. At the time, Cao Cao’s soldiers were out harvesting wheat, so he only had a small force at his camp and was outnumbered by an estimated 10 to 1. On hearing of Lü Bu’s approach, he hid half of his men in ambush behind a nearby dam and left the other half in plain view as bait. Lü Bu and Chen Gong fell for the trap and attacked. They were ambushed and the unexpected strike dismantled their army. Lü Bu’s army was crushed and he was forced to flee. Cao Cao capitalized on this momentum and rampaged across Lü Bu’s territory. With Cao Ren and Cao Hong leading the attacks, they retook large parts of Yan with great speed. After another victory over Lü Bu at Juye, Cao Cao was able to recapture all the cities in Yan Province, as Lü Bu fled eastwards to join Liu Bei, who had taken over Xu Province from Tao Qian.

Zhang Miao followed Lü Bu and left his brother Zhang Chao (張超), Administrator of Guangling, to take care of their family at Yongqiu. Cao Cao laid siege to Yongqiu for several months and eventually captured the city, killing Zhang Chao and his family. Zhang Miao pleaded for assistance from Yuan Shu but was rejected and killed by his soldiers. At the same time, a locust plague broke out, causing many to starve while some resorted to cannibalism. Lü Bu had also used up all his provisions, horse feed, and grain supplies so both sides were forced to withdraw.

== Aftermath ==
In 195, Lü Bu turned against Liu Bei, who had offered him refuge in Xu and led to the subsequent Battle of Xiapi in 199, when the allied forces of Cao Cao and Liu Bei launched an attack on Lü Bu in Xu Province. Lü Bu was executed on Cao Cao's order after his defeat.

== In popular culture ==
The battle is featured as a stage in Koei's video game Dynasty Warriors 5: Xtreme Legends called the "Battle of Yan Province". In 7, the battle is part of the "Battle of Xu Province", which has Lü Bu attacking Cao Cao's main camp. It should not be confused with the "Battle of Yan Province", which deals with remnants of the Yellow Turban rebels.
