= Chen Shi (Han dynasty) =

Chinese Eastern Han official (104–186)

Chen Shi Master Wenfan
- 陳寔

Personal details
- Born: 104 Xu County, Yingchuan Commandery, Eastern Han dynasty
- Died: 16 September 186 (aged 81–82)
- Children: 6 sons, including: Chen Ji
- Relatives: Chen Qun (grandson); Chen Tai (great-grandson)

Chen Shi (Chinese: 陳寔; 104 – 16 September 186), courtesy name Zhonggong (仲弓), was a mayor of Taiqiu County in the Eastern Han dynasty of China.

A native of Yingchuan Commandery (潁川郡; covering present-day southern and central Henan), Chen Shi was the father of Chen Ji and the paternal grandfather of Chen Qun. As he was the mayor (長) of Taiqiu County (太丘縣), he was also known as Chen Taiqiu (陳太丘). He was the primogenitor of the Chen clan of Yingchuan (潁川陳氏), and the central figure of the Qingliu school (清流派) in the Yingchuan region.

== Life ==
Chen Shi's 10th-generation ancestor Chen Zhen (陳軫), original name Tian Zhen (田軫), was a son of Tian Jian (田建), after Tian Zhen came from the state of Qi to reside in Yingchuan, he changed his surname from Tian to Chen, may be due to his ancestors as the ruler of the Chen state.

Though he was raised at an impoverished family in Xu County (許縣), which is present-day Xuchang, he loved books and studies at early years. As he was the person of rightfulness, without prejudice and generous, he was held in high repute among the common people. However, as he objected to the eunuchs' abuse of power, he was prevented from holding government positions by the Disasters of the Partisan Prohibitions. As he was prevented from government services, he lived a hermit life at his hometown. Whenever a civil lawsuit occurred, local residents invited him to preside over the case. Whenever consulted, Chen Shi provided reasonable judgements, and no one complained about the outcome. It was said that "Better to have your punishment increased, than to be found lacking by Master Chen."

In the 160s, when a teenage Xu Shao went to Yingchuan, he visited and mingled with many reputable men in the region, except for Chen Shi. Later, when Chen Fan's wife died, many people attended her funeral, but Xu Shao did not show up. When asked, Xu Shao replied, "Taiqiu is too well-acquainted, it's difficult for him to be thorough; Zhongju (Chen Fan's courtesy name) is a serious person who hardly makes compromises. These are the reasons why I didn't visit them."

After the Prohibitions were relieved in 184 during the reign of Emperor Ling of Han, He Jin sent a messenger and called Chen Shi to his ministration, but Chen Shi did not accept He Jin's offer and died soon after.

When he died in September 186, a crowd exceeding 30,000 assembled at his funeral, and those who wore mourning dress numbered in the hundreds. He was given the posthumous name Master Wenfan (文范先生).

== Descendants ==
Chen Shi had 6 sons:

- Chen Ji (陳紀), father of Chen Qun.
- Chen Kui (陳夔)
- Chen Qia (陳洽)
- Chen Chen (陳諶), a ancestor of Chen Baxian, the founding emperor of the Chen dynasty.
- Chen Xiu (陳休)
- Chen Guang (陳光)

The Buddhist monk Chen Hui or Xuanzang also descends from Chen Shi.

== See also ==
- Emperor Wu of Chen
- Xuanzang (Chen Hui)
