= Fu Xun =

Early 3rd century official serving Chinese warlord Liu Biao

- 傅巽

Master of Writing (尚書)
- In office 220 – ?
- Monarch: Cao Pi

Palace Attendant (侍中)
- In office 220 – ?
- Monarch: Cao Pi

Assistant Officer in the East Bureau (東曹掾)
- In office ?–?
- Monarch: Emperor Xian of Han

Gentleman of Writing (尚書郎)
- In office ?–?
- Monarch: Emperor Xian of Han

Personal details
- Born: Unknown Yaozhou District, Tongchuan, Shaanxi
- Died: between 227 and 233
- Relations: Fu Chong (brother); Fu Gu (nephew)
- Parent: Fu Rui (father)
- Occupation: General
- Courtesy name: Gongti (公悌)
- Peerage: Secondary Marquis (關內侯)

Fu Xun (Note: His name is incorrectly romanised as "Fu Xuan" in the online Brewitt-Taylor translation of the historical novel Romance of the Three Kingdoms.) (fl.200 – 227), courtesy name Gongti, was a politician of the state of Cao Wei during the Three Kingdoms period of China. He previously served under the warlord Liu Biao in the late Eastern Han dynasty.

== Life ==
Fu Xun was from Niyang County (泥陽縣), Beidi Commandery (北地郡), which is around present-day Yaozhou District, Tongchuan, Shaanxi. He was well-read and known for giving critical commentary on people. He was recruited into the civil service and served as a Gentleman of Writing (尚書郎). He later moved to Jing Province (covering present-day Hubei and Hunan) and became a guest official under the provincial governor, Liu Biao.

In 208, shortly after Liu Biao's death, the warlord Cao Cao invaded Jing Province and his army arrived outside the provincial capital, Xiangyang. Fu Xun, who was then an Assistant Officer in the East Bureau (東曹掾), along with Kuai Yue and Han Song (韓嵩), urged Liu Biao's younger son and successor Liu Cong to yield to Cao Cao. Liu Cong heeded their advice. Fu Xun came to serve Cao Cao and received a title of a Secondary Marquis (關內侯) for his effort in persuading Liu Cong to surrender.

In 220, Cao Cao's son and heir Cao Pi forced the Han dynasty's last ruler Emperor Xian to abdicate the throne to him, and subsequently established the state of Wei, marking the start of the Three Kingdoms period. Fu Xun served as a Palace Attendant (侍中) and Master of Writing (尚書) in Cao Pi's imperial court. He died in the Taihe era (227-233) of the reign of Cao Pi's successor Cao Rui.

When Fu Xun was in Jing Province, he once commented that Pang Tong was a "half-hero", and foresaw that Pei Qian (裴潛) would become famous for his good moral conduct. Fu Xun's comment on Pang Tong proved accurate as the latter received lesser treatment as compared to Zhuge Liang when he came to serve Liu Bei. As for Pei Qian, he eventually became Prefect of the Masters of Writing (尚書令) in Wei and enjoyed a reputation for being virtuous. When Fu Xun was serving under Cao Cao, he accurately predicted that Wei Feng would start a rebellion one day, and this came true in 219.

== See also ==
- Lists of people of the Three Kingdoms
