= Cao Hong =

Chinese military general (died 232)

- 曹洪
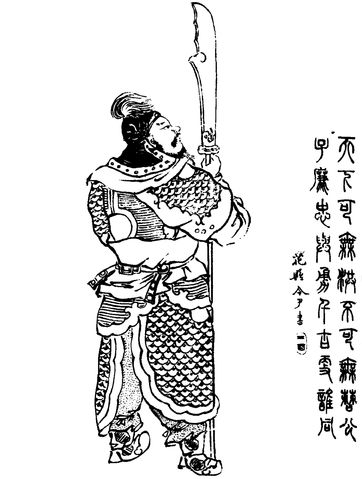
- A Qing dynasty illustration of Cao Hong

General of Agile Cavalry (驃騎將軍)
- In office c. late 220s – 232
- Monarch: Cao Rui

General of the Rear (後將軍)
- In office 227 – c. late 220s
- Monarch: Cao Rui

General of Agile Cavalry (驃騎將軍)
- In office 220 – c. early 220s
- Monarch: Cao Pi

Personal details
- Born: Unknown
- Died: 232
- Children: Cao Fu (died 14 July 311?) (Note: The Zizhi Tongjian recorded that Cao Fu died in the Disaster of Yongjia. However, it is possible that this Cao Fu was another person with the same name.); Cao Zhen; Xun Can's wife
- Occupation: Military general
- Courtesy name: Zilian (子廉)
- Posthumous name: Marquis Gong (恭侯)
- Peerage: Marquis of Lecheng (樂城侯)

Cao Hong (died 232), courtesy name Zilian, was a Chinese military general of the state of Cao Wei during the Three Kingdoms period of China. He started his career in the late Eastern Han dynasty under the warlord Cao Cao, who was his older second cousin.

== Early life and career ==
Cao Hong's uncle, Cao Ding (曹鼎), served as the Prefect of the Masters of Writing (尚書令) in the Han central government. Because of this connection, Cao Hong gained an official appointment as the Chief (長) of Qichun County (蘄春縣; northwest of present-day Qichun County, Hubei).

Around 190, the warlord Cao Cao, an older second cousin of Cao Hong, raised an army to participate in the campaign against the tyrannical warlord Dong Zhuo, who controlled the Han central government. Cao Hong joined Cao Cao around this time and served as an officer in his army. Cao Cao engaged Dong Zhuo's general Xu Rong at the Battle of Xingyang, but was defeated and forced to retreat. While fleeing from the enemy, Cao Cao lost his horse so Cao Hong got off his own horse and offered it to him. When Cao Cao declined, Cao Hong said, "The world can do without me, but not without you." He then escorted Cao Cao on foot to the bank of the Bian River. As the river was too deep for them to wade across, Cao Hong swam around in search of a boat and finally found one. They crossed the river and returned to Cao Cao's hometown in Qiao County (譙縣; present-day Bozhou, Anhui) safely.

Chen Wen (陳溫), the Inspector of Yang Province, was on friendly terms with Cao Hong. At the time, Cao Hong had about 1,000 men from his own militia. He asked for troops from Chen Wen, who provided him with 2,000 of his best soldiers. Cao Hong then went to Danyang Commandery (丹楊郡) and managed to recruit about another 1,000 men with help from the commandery's Administrator, Zhou Xin. He brought along his 4,000 troops to meet Cao Cao at Longkang (龍亢; in present-day Huaiyuan County, Anhui) and became one of Cao Cao's most loyal followers since then.

== Service under Cao Cao ==
=== Battles against Lü Bu in Yan Province ===
In 194, when Cao Cao was away on a campaign in Xu Province, his subordinates Zhang Miao and Chen Gong started a rebellion in his base, Yan Province, and defected to a rival warlord, Lü Bu. Around the time, a famine had broken out in Yan Province. Cao Hong led a vanguard force to retake Dongping (東平) and Fan (范) counties from Lü Bu and stockpile grain to feed the troops. After that, Cao Cao attacked Lü Bu at Puyang County (濮陽縣; west of present-day Puyang County, Henan) and defeated him. Cao Cao subsequently attacked and retook Dong'e (東阿), Jiyin (濟陰), Shanyang (山陽), Zhongmu (中牟), Yangwu (陽武), Jing (京), Mi (密) and other counties from Lü Bu. For his contributions in the Battle of Yan Province against Lü Bu, Cao Hong was first commissioned as Soaring Eagle Colonel (鷹揚校尉) and later promoted to General of the Household Who Spreads Martial Might (揚武中郎將).

=== Joining Cao Cao in receiving Emperor Xian ===
In February 196, acting on the advice of Xun Yu and Cheng Yu, Cao Cao sent Cao Hong west to fetch Emperor Xian (Note: Emperor Xian was held hostage in Chang'an by Li Jue, Guo Si and other former followers of Dong Zhuo. Around 195, when internal conflict broke out between Li Jue and Guo Si, Emperor Xian escaped from Chang'an and returned to the ruins of Luoyang (Luoyang was destroyed by fire in 190 when Dong Zhuo moved the capital to Chang'an). In Luoyang, he came under the protection of Dong Cheng and Yang Feng.) but was blocked by Dong Cheng and Yuan Shu's subordinate Chang Nu (萇奴). In August 196, Cao Cao led his forces into Luoyang and received Emperor Xian. Two months later, he relocated the emperor to his own base in Xu (許; present-day Xuchang, Henan), where the new imperial capital was established. Emperor Xian appointed Cao Hong as a Counsellor Remonstrant (諫議大夫).

=== Incident with Man Chong ===
When Man Chong was serving as the Prefect (令) of Xu County (許縣; present-day Xuchang, Henan), he arrested some of Cao Hong's retainers who broke the law. When Cao Hong heard about it, he wrote to Man Chong, asking for their release, but Man Chong refused. Cao Hong then brought up the issue to Cao Cao, who summoned the official who was overall in charge to come and see him. Man Chong thought that Cao Cao wanted to pardon Cao Hong's retainers, so he immediately ordered their execution. Cao Cao was pleased and he remarked, "Isn't this what an officeholder should do?"

=== Battles against Zhang Xiu ===
In 197, Cao Cao lost the Battle of Wancheng against a rival warlord Zhang Xiu and retreated to Wuyin County (舞陰縣; southeast of present-day Sheqi County, Henan). After Cao Cao left Wuyin County and returned to Xu (許; present-day Xuchang, Henan), the officials in Nanyang (南陽), Zhangling (章陵) and other counties who had surrendered to him earlier rebelled and defected to Zhang Xiu's side. Cao Cao sent Cao Hong to lead troops to recapture those counties but Cao Hong failed and was forced to retreat to a garrison at Ye County (葉縣; southwest of present-day Ye County, Henan). The garrison came under multiple attacks by Zhang Xiu and his ally Liu Biao.

=== Battle of Guandu ===
In the year 200, Cao Hong participated in the Battle of Guandu between Cao Cao and the northern warlord Yuan Shao. When both sides were locked in a stalemate around winter, Cao Cao heeded the advice of Xu You, a defector from Yuan Shao's side, and personally led 5,000 riders to raid Yuan's supply depot at Wuchao (烏巢; southeast of present-day Yanjin County, Henan), which was guarded by Chunyu Qiong. Cao Hong was ordered to remain behind to guard Cao Cao's main camp during the raid. Cao Cao succeeded in destroying Yuan Shao's supplies in the raid and killed Chunyu Qiong in battle.

When Yuan Shao heard that Wuchao was under attack, he sent his generals Zhang He and Gao Lan (高覽) to attack Cao Cao's main camp in the hope of diverting Cao's attention away from Wuchao. However, Zhang He and Gao Lan, already frustrated with Yuan Shao, ended up defecting to Cao Cao's side instead. They destroyed their own camps and led their men to Cao Cao's main camp to surrender. Cao Hong was initially suspicious about Zhang He and Gao Lan, but Xun You managed to convince him to accept their surrender.

=== Battles against Liu Biao and promotions ===
Cao Hong participated in the campaign against the warlord Liu Biao in Jing Province and defeated Liu's subordinates in battles at Wuyang (舞陽), Yinye (陰葉), Duyang (堵陽) and Bowang (博望). For his achievements, he was promoted to General of Sharp Edge (厲鋒將軍) and enfeoffed as the Marquis of Guoming Village (國明亭侯). Later, as he made more contributions in battles, he was further promoted to Protector-General (都護將軍).

=== Hanzhong Campaign ===
In the winter of 217, the warlord Liu Bei sent Zhang Fei, Ma Chao, Wu Lan (吳蘭) and others to garrison at Xiabian County (下辯縣; northwest of present-day Cheng County, Gansu) in preparation for an invasion of Hanzhong Commandery, which Cao Cao had seized from the warlord Zhang Lu after the Battle of Yangping in 215. Cao Cao ordered Cao Hong to lead forces to resist the enemy, with Cao Xiu serving as Cao Hong's adviser. Cao Cao had told Cao Xiu, "You may be an adviser, but you're actually the commander." When Cao Hong received the order, he delegated his command to Cao Xiu. Cao Hong heeded Cao Xiu's advice and defeated Wu Lan in the spring of 218 and killed Wu's deputy, Ren Kui (任夔). Wu Lan was slain by Qiangduan (強端), a Di chieftain from Yinping (陰平). Zhang Fei was forced to retreat.

Cao Hong then threw a party to celebrate his victory. He ordered some prostitutes to dress scantily and dance on drums to entertain everyone. Yang Fu, one of Cao Cao's advisers, openly reprimanded Cao Hong for the indecency of the performance, and then stormed out. Cao Hong immediately called off the performance and invited Yang Fu to return to his seat.

== Service in the state of Cao Wei ==
Cao Cao died in March 220. Later that year, his son and successor Cao Pi ended the Eastern Han dynasty and established the state of Cao Wei with himself as the emperor. Cao Pi appointed Cao Hong as General of the Guards (衞將軍) and promoted him to General of Agile Cavalry (驃騎將軍). He also made Cao Hong the Marquis of Yewang (野王侯) and gave him an additional 1,000 taxable households for his marquisate, making it 2,100 households in total. Cao Hong's marquis title was later renamed to "Marquis of Duyang" (都陽侯).

Cao Hong was wealthy but was also known for being stingy with his wealth. When Cao Cao was still the Minister of Works, he set an example by getting the county offices to keep records of the accounts of officials, including his. When he heard that his personal wealth was equivalent to Cao Hong's, he remarked, "How can my personal wealth be the same as Zilian's?"

=== Fall from grace ===
In the past, when Cao Pi was still a youth, he once asked Cao Hong for a loan, however, Cao Hong was naturally stingy and cherished his money, so he refused the request. Later, when Cao Pi was Cao Cao's heir apparent, he once asked Cao Hong to donate 100 rolls of silk but Cao Hong refused. Cao Pi bore a grudge against Cao Hong because of this. After Cao Pi became emperor, he found an opportunity to take revenge against Cao Hong. In one incident, when Cao Hong's retainers committed crimes, Cao Pi used the incident as an excuse to accuse Cao Hong of negligence and had him imprisoned to await execution. When his ministers tried to persuade him to spare Cao Hong, Cao Pi refused to listen.

Apparently, Cao Hong had previously offended Cao Zhen, another relative of Cao Cao who also served as a general in Wei. In 224, when Cao Zhen returned from a campaign, Cao Pi ordered Wu Zhi to host a banquet in his residence in Cao Zhen's honour. During the banquet, Wu Zhi instructed actors to put up a skit to make fun of Cao Zhen and Zhu Shuo (朱鑠), who were fat and thin respectively. Cao Zhen was enraged and he shouted at Wu Zhi, "Are you and your men seeking a fight with me and my men?" Cao Hong and Wang Zhong egged Wu Zhi on by saying, "If you want to make the General (Cao Zhen) admit that he is fat, you have to show that you're thin." Cao Zhen drew his sword, glared at them and said, "I'll kill whoever dares to mock me." When Cao Hong got into trouble later, Cao Zhen told Cao Pi, "If Cao Hong is to be executed, he'll definitely say something nasty about me." Cao Pi replied, "I'll deal with him myself. Why do you need to worry?"

Cao Pi's mother, Empress Dowager Bian, intervened and scolded her son, "If not for what Zilian did at Liang (梁) and Pei (沛), (Note: Empress Dowager Bian was probably referring to the incident after the Battle of Xingyang where Cao Hong saved Cao Cao's life.) you wouldn't have made it to where you are today." She also told Cao Pi's empress, Guo Nüwang, "If Cao Hong dies today, tomorrow I'll make the Emperor remove you from your position as Empress." The empress then tearfully pleaded with Cao Pi several times to spare Cao Hong. Cao Pi finally agreed to spare Cao Hong, but stripped him of his appointments and titles and confiscated his properties. After Empress Dowager Bian intervened again, Cao Pi reluctantly returned Cao Hong his properties but did not restore him to his former positions. Upon learning that Cao Pi had pardoned him, Cao Hong was so overjoyed that he wrote a memorial to the emperor to express his remorse and said he would spend the rest of his life behind the walls of his home.

=== Rehabilitation and death ===
As Cao Hong was highly regarded for having made great contributions in the past, many people were upset over his demotion and fall from grace. Cao Pi died in June 226 and was succeeded by his son, Cao Rui, as the emperor of Wei. Cao Rui rehabilitated Cao Hong by appointing him as General of the Rear (後將軍) and enfeoffing him as the Marquis of Lecheng (樂城侯) with 1,000 taxable households as his marquisate. Later, he promoted Cao Hong to General of Agile Cavalry (驃騎將軍).

Cao Hong died in 232 and was given the posthumous title "Marquis Gong" (恭侯), which means "humble(d) marquis". (Note: According to the "Rules of assigning posthumous names" chapter in the Yizhoushu, an official could receive the posthumous name "Gong" (恭) for being able to correct past mistakes. In Cao Hong's case, he changed his snobbish attitude after being punished.) His title, Marquis of Lecheng (樂城侯), was passed on to his son, Cao Fu (曹馥). Cao Zhen (曹震), another son of Cao Hong, had already previously been enfeoffed as a marquis. Cao Yu (曹瑜), an older relative of Cao Hong, was known for being conscientious and respectful, and had served as General of the Guards (衞將軍) and been enfeoffed as a marquis as well. Cao Hong's daughter, who was known for her beautiful looks, married Xun Can, a son of Xun Yu. She died a few years after their marriage, and Xun Can was so grieved by her death that he also died a few years later.

== In Romance of the Three Kingdoms ==
Cao Hong appears as a minor character in the historical novel Romance of the Three Kingdoms, which romanticises the events before and during the Three Kingdoms period. In chapter 58, Cao Hong had a rather prominent role at the Battle of Tong Pass between Cao Cao and a coalition of northwestern warlords led by Ma Chao and Han Sui. Cao Cao had instructed Cao Hong to guard Tong Pass for ten days at all costs and not leave his post. However, after hearing taunts from the enemy for nine days, Cao Hong finally gave in to his anger and led his troops out of the pass to engage the enemy. He not only lost the battle but also lost the pass as well. Cao Cao was so angry with Cao Hong that he wanted to execute him for disobeying orders, but his subordinates stopped him. Later on, Cao Hong redeemed himself by risking his life to save Cao Cao, who was fleeing from the battlefield after being defeated by Ma Chao. Cao Hong blocked Ma Chao from chasing Cao Cao and duelled with him for about 100 rounds until Ma gave up and retreated. Cao Cao pardoned Cao Hong for his earlier mistake after taking into consideration how Cao Hong saved his life. There is no mention of these incidents in historical records.

== See also ==
- Lists of people of the Three Kingdoms
