= Xun Cai =

2nd-century Chinese noblewoman and poet

Xun Cai 荀采
- Spouse: Yin Yu
- Father: Xun Shuang

Xun Cai (荀采; fl.2nd century), (Note: While Xun Cai's death date and age when she died were not recorded, her biography implied that she died before her father, who died in c.July 190. Her biography also implied that she died within a few years after her daughter was born. Thus, she was likely in her early 20s when she died. As her father was born in c.128, her own birth year should be in or after c.140.) courtesy name Nüxun (女荀), was a Chinese noblewoman and poet from the late Eastern Han dynasty to the early Three Kingdoms period.

== Early life ==
She was the daughter of Xun Shuang, a writer turned politician at the court of Han empire. She was first the wife of Yin Yu. Later, she was matchmade with Guo Yi. She was the cousin of Xun Yu, an adviser to the warlord Cao Cao. The Xun family was a scholarly and skilled clan. Among Xun Cai's other relatives was Xun You, adviser to Cao Cao. Through marriage, Xun Cai was linked to the Yin family.

She was described as skilled in poetry and intelligent woman, but best known for her devotion to Yin Yu and maintaining ties with the Yin clan even after Yin Yu's death. Due to her convictions, her biography was recorded in Book of the Later Han in volume 84, Biographies of Exemplary Women (卷八十四 列女傳 第七十四).

== Adulthood ==
She married Yin Yu from Nanyang at seventeen (by East Asian reckoning), and at nineteen (by East Asian reckoning) gave birth to a daughter. Shortly after their daughter's birth, Yin Yu died.

According to tradition, if a husband dies, the wife can remarry. She knew that her family wanted her to remarry, but her sense she remained in the Yin clan for a while and refused any request to join another clan through marriage. Xun Shuang asked Xun Cai to marry Guo Yi. (Note: Sources differ on Guo Yi's origins. Xun Cai's biography in Houhanshu indicated that Guo Yi was from the same commandery, i.e. Yingchuan, thus implying that he was Guo Jia's son of the same name. The Taiping Yulan recorded that Guo Yi was from Taiyuan; Guo Huai's clan was also from Taiyuan.) Guo Yi was an official who became known at an early age. He was a widower and wanted to remarry.

After Xun Cai declined the marriage proposal, Xun Shuang feigned illness and asked her to visit him. She prepared a knife to protect herself and traveled to her father's house. Xun Shuang's plan was to bring her home and force her to marry Guo Yi. When she learned that her father had tricked, Xun Cai refused to remarry and took up a knife threatening to take her own life. Xun Shuang ordered the servants to take the knife and send Xun Cai to Guo's house. During the trip, Xun Shuang was worried that Xun Cai was too angry and might cause trouble.

After arriving at Guo's house, Xun Cai pretended to be happy Some time later she said to the others, "At first, I expected to die in the same tomb as Yin Yu, but I was forced by my family to come here and I couldn't fulfill my wish. I was helpless!". During the wedding night she ordered people to light oil lamps everywhere and got dressed. Upon meeting Guo Yi, she spoke seriously about ideas and life with him all night. Guo Yi was shocked by Xun Cai's feelings, so he did not force her to marry him. Guo Yi was a gentleman who greatly admired Xun Cai, so he said that he would leave at dawn. When Guo Yi left, Xun Cai ordered the people around her to get ready for a stone cold bath. After entering the bathroom, she asked the servants to leave and locked the door, then wrote on the bathroom door with incense powder: "The corpse is for (the) Yin (clan)." to express loyalty to the Yin family and her ex-husband. She hanged herself with her belt. The servants waiting outside weren't watching her, and when they found out, Xun Cai had already died.

== Sources ==
- Chen, Shou (3rd century). Records of the Three Kingdoms (Sanguozhi).
- Fan, Ye (5th century). Book of the Later Han (Houhanshu).
