= Fu Gu =

Cao Wei state official (209-255)

- 傅嘏

Manager of the Affairs of the Masters of Writing (錄尚書事) (under the General-in-Chief)
- In office 255 – 255
- Monarch: Cao Mao

Master of Writing (尚書)
- In office 249 – 255
- Monarch: Cao Fang/ Cao Mao

Intendant of Henan (河南尹)
- In office 239 – 255
- Monarch: Cao Fang/ Cao Mao

Personal details
- Born: 209 (Note: Fu Gu's biography in the Sanguozhi recorded that he died in the 2nd year of the Zhengyuan era (254-256) of Cao Mao's reign. He was 47 years old (by East Asian age reckoning) when he died. Also, Fu died after Sima Shi, who died on 23 March in the Julian calendar; the year ends on 12 Feb 256. By calculation, Fu Gu's year of birth should be 209.) Yaozhou District, Tongchuan, Shaanxi
- Died: between 23 March 255 and 12 February 256 (aged 46)
- Relations: Fu Jiezi (ancestor); Fu Rui (grandfather); Fu Xun (uncle)
- Children: Fu Zhi
- Parent: Fu Chong (father)
- Occupation: Official
- Courtesy name: Lanshi (蘭石) / Zhaoxian (昭先)
- Posthumous name: Marquis Yuan (元侯)
- Peerage: Marquis of Yang District (陽鄉侯)

Fu Gu (Note: The character "嘏" has two pronunciations: "gǔ" and "jiǎ") (209–255), courtesy name Lanshi, was an official of the state of Cao Wei during the Three Kingdoms period of China.

== Life ==
Fu Gu's grandfather was Fu Rui (傅睿), Administrator (太守) of Dai Prefecture (代郡) in the late Eastern Han dynasty. His father was Fu Chong (傅充), a Gentleman of the Yellow Gate (黃門侍郎), and his uncle was Fu Xun. Already well known in his 20s, Fu Gu was recommended by Chen Qun to serve the Wei government and was appointed as a low-level official.

In those days, the most famous officials in Wei were He Yan, Deng Yang and Xiahou Xuan. Fu Gu disliked them, distanced himself from them, and chose to associate with Xun Can instead. Although Li Feng was from the same home province as Fu Gu, Fu was on bad terms with him and foresaw that Li would eventually ruin his own reputation.

In 240, Fu Gu was appointed as a Gentleman of Writing (尚書郎) and Gentleman of the Yellow Gate (黃門侍郎).

At those days, Cao Shuang appointed He Yan as the Minister of Civil Affairs (吏部尚書) and put He Yan in charge of personnel allocation. Fu Gu advised Cao Xi (曹羲), a brother of Cao Shuang, that He Yan could not be entrusted with an important responsibility. However, soon later, as his advice were heard by He Yan, Fu Gu was discharged from his position. After that, he was appointed as the County Prefect (縣令) of Yingyang (滎陽) (滎陽県令) but he rejected the appointment. Later, he accepted an offer from Sima Yi to serve as an Assistant Officer of the Household (從事中郎). After Cao Shuang lost power, he was appointed as Intendant of Henan (河南尹) and Master of Writing (尚書).

In 252, after the death of the Eastern Wu emperor Sun Quan, the Wei generals on the frontline such as Hu Zun, Wang Chang and Guanqiu Jian had the intention of using the opportunity to attack their rival state. When Fu Gu was asked for his opinion, he objected to the campaign against Wu. Although the campaign went ahead, Wei forces led by Hu Zun and Zhuge Dan met their defeat at the Battle of Dongxing in 252 by the Wu forces led by Zhuge Ke. Fu Gu was later awarded the title of a Secondary Marquis (關內侯).

Later in 254, Sima Shi deposed the Wei emperor Cao Fang and replaced him with Cao Mao. Fu Gu was promoted from a Secondary Marquis to the Marquis of Wuxiang Village (武鄉亭侯).

In 255, enraged at the regent Sima Shi for deposing the emperor Cao Fang, Guanqiu Jian and Wen Qin started a rebellion in Shouchun against Sima Shi. As Sima Shi was then suffering from an eye disease, the officials urged him to let Sima Fu lead imperial forces to quell the rebellion. However, Fu Gu, Wang Su and Zhong Hui advised him to personally lead the army instead. Sima Shi heeded their advice. Fu Gu participated in the campaign as Supervisor of the Masters of Writing (尚書僕射). Sima Shi's brother Sima Zhao was also involved. Fu Gu contributed to the suppression of the rebellion. During the campaign, Sima Shi's eye condition worsened and he died days later in March that year.

After Sima Shi died in Xuchang, Sima Zhao took over his brother's position as the regent of Wei. In an attempt to prevent a transfer of power from Sima Shi to Sima Zhao, the Wei emperor Cao Mao ordered Sima Zhao to remain in Xuchang and let Fu Gu lead the army back to the capital Luoyang. However, Fu Gu and Zhong Hui met up with Sima Zhao, defied Cao Mao's orders, and returned to the capital together.

Fu Gu was later enfeoffed as the Marquis of Yang District (陽鄉侯) and his fief increased by 600 households to a total of 1200. He died in the same year.

== Descendants ==
Fu Gu had a son, Fu Zhi (傅祗; c.244 - June or July 312); (Note: Fu Zhi's biography in Book of Jin recorded that he died at the age of 69 (by East Asian reckoning) soon after the Disaster of Yongjia. The Zizhi Tongjian dated Fu Zhi's death to the 5th month of the 6th year of the Yongjia era; the month corresponds to 21 Jun to 19 Jul 312 in the Julian calendar.) Fu Xuan (傅宣; fl.267 - 307) (Note: Fu Zhi's biography in Book of Jin recorded that Fu Xuan died at the age of 49 (by East Asian reckoning) in an unknown year; he was appointed to his final two posts during the reign of Emperor Huai of Jin.) and Fu Chang (傅暢; died 330) were his grandsons. (Note: Fu Zhi had a biography in vol.47 of Book of Jin.)

== See also ==
- Lists of people of the Three Kingdoms
