= Xun Yue =

Chinese official, historian and scholar (148–209)

- 荀悅

Master of Writing (尚書)
- In office c. 200 – 209
- Monarch: Emperor Xian of Han
- Chancellor: Cao Cao

Personal details
- Born: 148 (Note: The Houhanshu mentioned that Xun Yue died in 209 at the age of 62 (by East Asian age reckoning). By calculation, his birth year should be around 148.)
- Died: 209 (aged 61)
- Relations: See Xun family of Yingchuan
- Parent: Xun Jian (father)
- Occupation: Historian, philosopher, politician
- Courtesy name: Zhongyu (仲豫)

Xun Yue (148–209), courtesy name Zhongyu, was a Chinese historian, philosopher, and politician of the Eastern Han dynasty of China. Born in the influential Xun family of Yingchuan Commandery (穎川郡; around present-day Xuchang, Henan), Xun Yue served in the Han government as a historian and wrote 13 chapters of the historical text Annals of Han (漢紀), which covered the history of the Western Han dynasty (206 BCE – 9 CE).

== Life ==
Xun Yue's ancestral home was in Yingchuan Commandery (穎川郡; around present-day Xuchang, Henan). His grandfather, Xun Shu (荀淑), was an official who served as the Prefect (令) of Langling County (朗陵縣) and as the Chancellor (相) to the Marquis of Langling County. Xun Shu had eight sons, who were nicknamed the "Eight Dragons of the Xun Family" (荀氏八龍). Xun Yue's father, Xun Jian (荀儉), was the eldest among Xun Shu's eight sons. He died early.

Xun Yue was known for being studious and academically inclined since childhood. When he was just 11, he could already recite and discuss the Spring and Autumn Annals. As his family was poor and could not afford books, he borrowed books from others to read and memorised them after reading through once. Although he had a good-looking appearance, he was also known for his quiet and introverted character.

When the eunuch faction came to power during Emperor Ling's reign (168–189), many scholar-officials decided to leave the political arena to avoid getting into trouble. Xun Yue claimed that he was in poor health and led a life of seclusion. Many people did not know about his talent. Only his younger cousin, Xun Yu, treated him respectfully and regarded him highly.

In the 190s, the warlord Cao Cao came to power and took control of the Han central government, while paying nominal allegiance to Emperor Xian. At the time, Cao Cao held the appointment of General Who Guards the East (鎮東將軍). He initially recruited Xun Yue as his subordinate. Xun Yue was later promoted to a Gentleman of the Yellow Gate (黃門侍郎). As Emperor Xian was fond of studying literature, he ordered Xun Yue, Xun Yu and Kong Rong, who were known for their expertise in literature, to mentor and guide him. Xun Yue was further promoted to Custodian of the Private Library (秘書監) and Palace Attendant (侍中).

At the time, Emperor Xian had been reduced to the status of a figurehead emperor and Cao Cao was in fact the de facto ruler even though he was nominally a subject of the emperor. Although Xun Yue longed for Emperor Xian to retake the reins of power from Cao Cao, he knew that it would not become reality and worried that his ideas would go to waste. As such, he wrote the five-chapter Shenjian (申鑒; Extended Reflections), in which he discussed, among other things, the importance of education and customs, of the balance of rewards and punishments, and the requirements of social justice – including a proposal for restoring the well-field system and opposing the excesses of the landed gentry. More generally, he sought to defend the Han dynasty's traditions by arguing for the preservation and striving for ideals of government, in spite of the realities of human failing. The Australian sinologist Rafe de Crespigny pointed out that when Xun Yue advocated for the need to rely on good officials rather than the vagaries of individual rulers, he could almost be seen as approaching a view of constitutional monarchy. Ch'en Ch'i-yün, who translated the Shenjian into English in 1980, described Xun Yue as "Confucianist in his approach to scholarship, Taoist in his relativistic view of reality, and Legalist in his pragmatic approach towards politics."

Emperor Xian also enjoyed reading historical texts. He found Ban Gu's Book of Han, which covered the history of the Western Han dynasty (206 BCE – 9 CE), very complicated and difficult to read. He thus ordered Xun Yue to write another version of the Book of Han in the style of the Zuo Zhuan, a commentary on the historical text Spring and Autumn Annals. Xun Yue did as instructed, and completed and presented 13 chapters of the historical text Annals of Han (漢紀) in 200 CE. Apart from being a study of history, the Annals of Han sought to demonstrate how imperial virtue had accumulated over generations. It implied that the process had continued under the Eastern Han dynasty and that one should look to a restoration of the Han dynasty rather than usurpation by a subject, no matter how powerful he was. In recognition of his contributions, Xun Yue was promoted to a Master of Writing (尚書) and awarded an ink brush and a scroll.

Xun Yue also wrote numerous chapters in other books such as Chongde (崇德) and Zhenglun (正論). He died in 209 at the age of 62 (by East Asian age reckoning).

== See also ==
- Lists of people of the Three Kingdoms
