= Xun language =

Xun may refer to any of several southern African Khoisan languages

- Juǀʼhoan language
- Kxoe language
