= Xun You =

Chinese statesman and advisor to Cao Cao (157–214)

- 荀攸
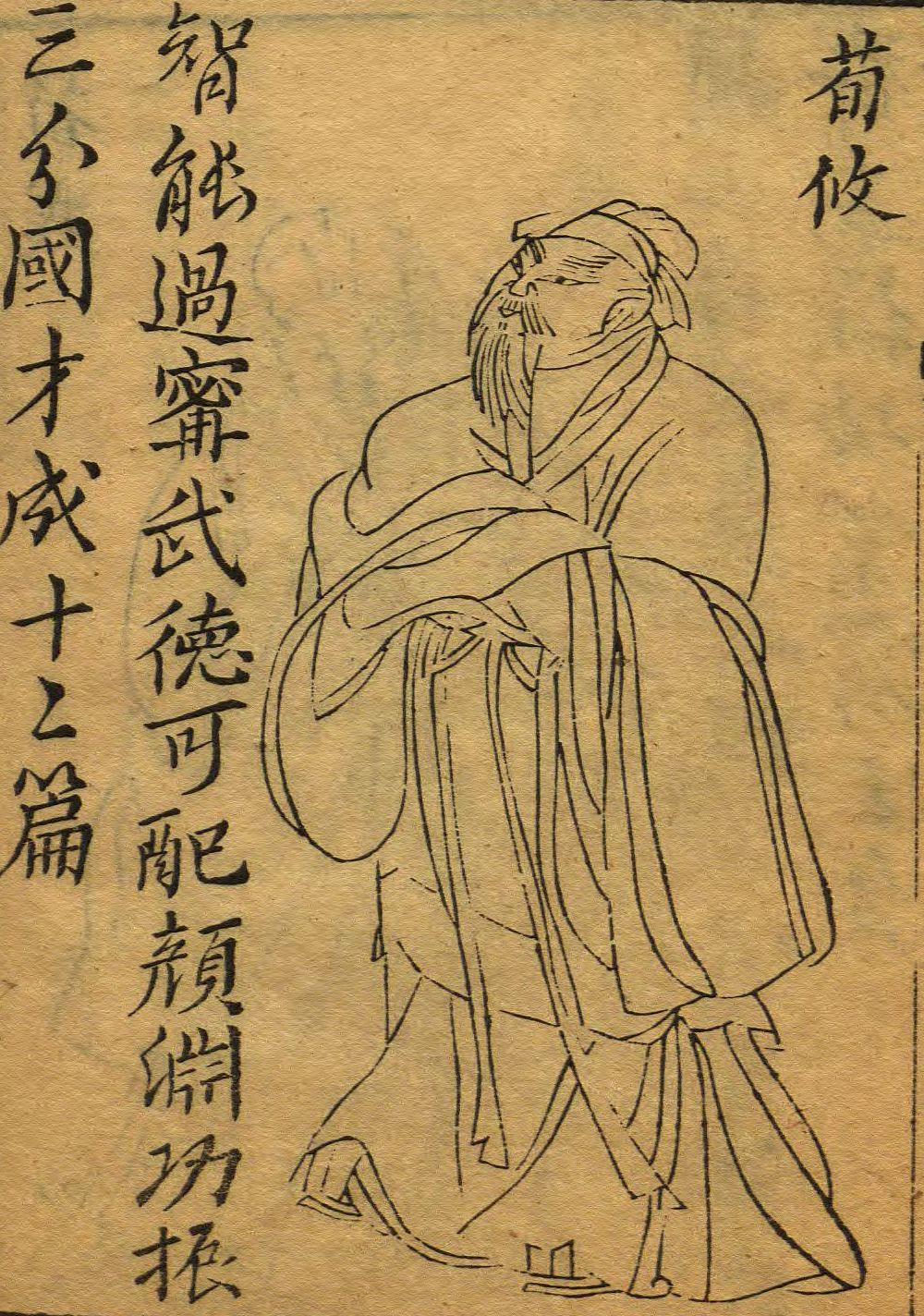

Prefect of the Masters of Writing (尚書令)
- In office 213 – 214
- Monarch: Emperor Xian of Han
- Chancellor: Cao Cao

Master of Writing (尚書) (under Cao Cao)
- In office 196 – ?
- Monarch: Emperor Xian of Han

Personal details
- Born: 157
- Died: c.September 214 (aged 57)
- Children: Xun Ji; Xun Shi; at least one more son
- Parent: Xun Yi (father)
- Occupation: Statesman, adviser
- Courtesy name: Gongda (公達)
- Posthumous name: Marquis Jing (敬侯)
- Peerage: Marquis of Lingshu Village (陵樹亭侯)

Xun You (157–c.September 214), courtesy name Gongda, was a statesman who lived during the late Eastern Han dynasty of China and served as an adviser to the warlord Cao Cao. Born in the influential Xun family of Yingchuan Commandery (around present-day Xuchang, Henan), Xun You was recruited into the civil service by the general He Jin. When the warlord Dong Zhuo hijacked and controlled the Han central government between 189 and 192, Xun You plotted with four others to assassinate him but was discovered and imprisoned. Following his release after Dong Zhuo's death, he wanted to serve as the Administrator of Shu Commandery (around present-day Chengdu, Sichuan) but eventually settled as an official in Jing Province.

In 196, after Cao Cao received the figurehead Han sovereign, Emperor Xian, and reestablished the new imperial capital in Xu (許; present-day Xuchang, Henan), he summoned Xun You to the capital to serve as a Master of Writing and Military Adviser. From then on, Xun You was simultaneously a Han statesman and a subordinate of Cao Cao. He accompanied Cao Cao on his military campaigns as a tactical adviser and occasional commander. Between 198 and 207, he advised Cao Cao in the battles against rival warlords such as Zhang Xiu, Lü Bu, Yuan Shao and Yuan Shao's successors. In 207, on Cao Cao's recommendation, Emperor Xian made Xun You a village marquis to honour him for his contributions. In 213, after Cao Cao had been enfeoffed by Emperor Xian as the Duke of Wei, Xun You served as the Prefect of the Masters of Writing in Cao Cao's dukedom. In 214, while accompanying Cao Cao on a campaign against the southern warlord Sun Quan, Xun You died of illness along the way. The Sanguozhi describes Xun You as a deep and perceptive thinker who kept a low profile and guarded confidential matters. (Note: Sanguozhi vol.10.)

== Historical sources ==
The authoritative historical source on Xun You's life is his official biography in book 10 of the Records of the Three Kingdoms (Sanguozhi), which was written by Chen Shou in the third century.

In the fifth century, Pei Songzhi annotated the Sanguozhi by incorporating information from other sources to Chen Shou's original work and adding his personal commentary. Some alternative texts used in the annotations to the Sanguozhi include: the Wei Shu (魏書; Book of Wei), by Wang Shen (王沈), Xun Yi (荀顗) and Ruan Ji; the Xun Shi Jia Zhuan (荀氏家傳; Xun Family Genealogy); the Han Ji (漢紀; Annals of Han), by Zhang Fan (張璠); the Fu Zi (傅子), by Fu Xuan.

== Family background and childhood ==
Xun You was born in the influential Xun family, whose ancestral home was in Yingyin County (潁陰縣), Yingchuan Commandery (穎川郡), which is in present-day Xuchang, Henan. (Note: (荀彧字文若，潁川潁陰人也。) Sanguozhi vol. 10.) His grandfather, Xun Tan (荀曇), whose courtesy name was Yuanzhi (元智), served as the Administrator (太守) of Guangling Commandery (廣陵郡; around present-day Huai'an, Jiangsu). (Note: (荀攸字公達，彧從子也。祖父曇，廣陵太守。) Sanguozhi vol. 10.) Xun Tan and his brother Xun Yu (荀昱; courtesy name Botiao [伯条]) (Note: Per Xun Shu's biography in Houhanshu, Xun Tan's and Xun Botiao's father was an elder brother of Xun Shu.) were deeply against the eunuch faction at court. While they were serving as officials (Tan as Administrator of Guangling and Yu as Chancellor of Pei), whenever they encountered associates or subordinates of the eunuch faction, they would execute such persons even if they were convicted of minor crimes. Later, Xun Yu died together with Li Ying in late 169, while Tan was barred from office as a partisan for the rest of his life. Xun You's father, Xun Yi (荀彝), served as a commandery-level Assistant Officer (從事). Xun Yi was a second cousin of Xun Yu and Xun Yue. Hence, Xun You was Xun Yu's and Xun Yue's second cousin-nephew (Note: (荀氏家傳曰：曇字元智。兄昱，字伯脩。張璠漢紀稱昱、曇並傑俊有殊才。昱與李膺、王暢、杜密等號為八俊，位至沛相。攸父彝，州從事。彝於彧為從祖兄弟。) Xun Shi Jia Zhuan and Han Ji annotations in Sanguozhi vol. 10.) even though he was six years older than Xun Yu. (Note: (計其年大彧六歲。) Wei Shu annotation in Sanguozhi vol. 10.)

Xun You was orphaned at a young age. He was probably raised by his uncle Xun Qu (荀衢) and his grandfather Xun Tan. When his grandfather died in c.169, a minor administrative assistant, Zhang Quan (張權), offered to be the tomb keeper. Xun You, who was 12 years old then, sensed that something was wrong. He told his uncle Xun Qu, "This man looks suspicious. I believe he's up to something." Upon investigation, it was revealed that Zhang Quan was actually a murderer on the run. Because of this incident, the young Xun You was seen as an extraordinary boy. (Note: (攸少孤。及曇卒，故吏張權求守曇墓。攸年十三，疑之，謂叔父衢曰：「此吏有非常之色，殆將有姦！」衢寤，乃推問，果殺人亡命。由是異之。) Sanguozhi vol. 10.) When Xun You was six or seven, Xun Qu once accidentally injured him while he was drunk. Since then, every time Xun You left or entered his home, he would do so at times to deliberately avoid meeting his uncle. Xun Qu was very surprised by his nephew's intelligence when he heard about it. (Note: (魏書曰：攸年七八歲，衢曾醉，誤傷攸耳；而攸出入遊戲，常避護不欲令衢見。衢後聞之，乃驚其夙智如此。) Wei Shu annotation in Sanguozhi vol. 10.)

== Early career ==
When He Jin rose to power in 189 and became regent to his nephew, the young Emperor Shao, he recruited over 20 notable members of scholar-gentry background to join him including Xun You, who had been noted by the famed judge of talent Yin Xiu (陰脩). (Note: (南陽陰脩為潁川太守，以旌賢擢俊為務，舉五官掾張仲方正，察功曹鍾繇、主簿荀彧、主記掾張禮、賊曹掾杜祐、孝廉荀攸、計吏郭圖為吏，以光國朝) Hanshu (by Xie Cheng) annotation in Sanguozhi, vol.13.) He was appointed as a Gentleman of the Yellow Gate (黃門侍郎), allowing him to act as a liaison to the palace, in the imperial capital, Luoyang and would be the person fellow recruit Zheng Tai would complain to . However, within the same year, He Jin was assassinated by the eunuch faction he had sought to destroy. The warlord Dong Zhuo took advantage of the ensuing political turmoil to hijack and control the central government. Between 190 and 191, several regional warlords formed a coalition and launched a campaign against Dong Zhuo in the name of saving the emperor, in response Dong Zhuo ordered Luoyang to be burnt down and relocated the capital to Chang'an. In Chang'an, Xun You secretly plotted with Zheng Tai (鄭泰), He Yong, Chong Ji (种輯) and Wu Qiong (伍瓊) to assassinate Dong Zhuo, who was notorious for his cruelty and tyranny. However, they were discovered and Xun You was arrested and imprisoned. While he was incarcerated, Xun You spoke and behaved normally as though nothing had happened. He was only released after Dong Zhuo was killed in 192. (Note: (何進秉政，徵海內名士攸等二十餘人。攸到，拜黃門侍郎。董卓之亂，關東兵起，卓徙都長安。攸與議郎鄭泰、何顒、侍中种輯、越騎校尉伍瓊等謀曰：「董卓無道，甚於桀紂，天下皆怨之，雖資彊兵，實一匹夫耳。今直刺殺之以謝百姓，然後據殽、函，輔王命，以號令天下，此桓文之舉也。」事垂就而覺，收顒、攸繫獄，顒憂懼自殺，攸言語飲食自若，會卓死得免。) Sanguozhi vol. 10.) However, the Wei Shu mentioned that Xun You was released after he sent someone to persuade and convince Dong Zhuo to free him. (Note: (魏書云攸使人說卓得免，與此不同。) Wei Shu annotation in Sanguozhi vol. 10.)

Xun You then resigned amidst the chaos resulting from Dong Zhuo's assassination and fled home. Appointed to be the Chancellor (相) of Rencheng State (任城; southwest of present-day Zoucheng, Shandong), he rejected this appointment and asked to be the Administrator (太守) of Shu Commandery (蜀郡; around present-day Chengdu, Sichuan) because he heard that Shu Commandery was prosperous and situated in a geographically strategic location. However, he was unable to travel to Shu Commandery as the routes to Shu had been cut off in the chaos, choosing instead to stay in the relative stability of Jing Province. (Note: (棄官歸，復辟公府，舉高第，遷任城相，不行。攸以蜀漢險固，人民殷盛，乃求為蜀郡太守，道絕不得至，駐荊州。) Sanguozhi vol. 10.)

== Service under Cao Cao ==
In 196, the warlord Cao Cao took control of Emperor Xian and brought him to Xu (許; present-day Xuchang, Henan), establishing the new capital there. He wrote to Xun You: "The Empire is in chaos. It is time for intelligent people to do something. Do you not think you have spent too much time observing the changes in the Shu region?" Xun You was then appointed as the Administrator (太守) of Runan Commandery (汝南郡; around present-day Gushi County, Henan) and later, probably in 198, (Note: Sanguozhi vol.1. When Cao Cao installed the rank of Master of the Army) summoned to the capital to serve as a Master of Writing (尚書). Cao Cao had long heard of Xun You and was overjoyed when they finally met. He told Xun Yu and Zhong Yao: "Gongda is no ordinary person. Now that I have him to advise me, why should I worry about not being able to pacify the Empire?" He also appointed Xun You as Master of the Army (軍師), (Note: (太祖迎天子都許，遺攸書曰：「方今天下大亂，智士勞心之時也，而顧觀變蜀漢，不已乆乎！」於是徵攸為汝南太守，入為尚書。太祖素聞攸名，與語大恱，謂荀彧，鍾繇曰：「公達，非常人也，吾得與之計事，天下當何憂哉！」以為軍師。) Sanguozhi vol. 10.) always accompanying Cao Cao on campaign (Note: (自從太祖征伐，常謀謨帷幄) Sanguozhi vol.10.) with Rafe De Crespigny identifying the rank as a chief of staff role, becoming one of Cao Cao's chief advisers. He would become close to Zhong Yao and seems to have worked closely with the young Guo Jia, another chief adviser. At some unknown point he helped compile a collection of administrative and penal codes for Cao Cao called the "Wei guan yi".

=== Battles against Zhang Xiu and Lü Bu ===
In 198, when Cao Cao wanted to launch another attack on a rival warlord, Zhang Xiu, Xun You advised against it, saying, "Zhang Xiu and Liu Biao share borders. Zhang Xiu and his wandering army rely on Liu Biao for supplies. Liu Biao is unable to provide for them so they will eventually fall out. Why not wait and try to induce Zhang Xiu to surrender to you? When Zhang Xiu ends up in a desperate situation, Liu Biao will definitely support him." Cao Cao ignored Xun You's advice and attacked Zhang Xiu at Rang County (穰縣; present-day Dengzhou, Henan). Just as Xun You predicted, Liu Biao sent reinforcements to help Zhang Xiu, threatening Cao Cao's rear so putting Cao Cao's attacking forces in a disadvantageous position. Cao Cao told Xun You that he regretted not listening to his advice and was forced to retreat with mixed results against his pursuers. (Note: (建安三年，從征張繡。攸言於太祖曰：「繡與劉表相恃為彊，然繡以遊軍仰食於表，表不能供也，勢必離。不如緩軍以待之，可誘而致也；若急之，其勢必相救。」太祖不從，遂進軍之穰，與戰。繡急，表果救之。軍不利。太祖謂攸曰：「不用君言至是。」乃設奇兵復戰，大破之。) Sanguozhi vol. 10.)

Despite the setback Cao Cao wanted to move to attack another rival warlord, the warrior Lü Bu in Xu Province to the east. Some warned against moving east as Zhang Xiu and Liu Biao might attack after their recent victory. However, Xun You had a different opinion: he believed that Zhang Xiu and Liu Biao had yet to recover from a heavy defeat when pursuing Cao Cao and would not make any further moves. He warned Lü Bu was a formidable warrior and had support from the claimant emperor Yuan Shu, if left unchecked he could become a considerable threat and many would support him but right now, Lü Bu's allied forces were not yet organized so could be defeated if they moved now. Lü Bu defeated Liu Bei and received help from Zang Ba but his uncoordinated army would struggle against Cao Cao. (Note: (魏書曰：議者云表、繡在後而還襲呂布，其危必也。攸以為表、繡新破，勢不敢動。布驍猛，又恃袁術，若從橫淮、泗間，豪傑必應之。今乘其初叛，衆心未一，往可破也。太祖曰：「善。」比行，布以敗劉備，而臧霸等應之。) Wei Shu annotation in Sanguozhi vol. 10.)

During the Battle of Xiapi, Cao Cao defeated Lü Bu in the initial stages and forced him to retreat to Xiapi Commandery (下邳郡; south of present-day Pizhou, Jiangsu). Cao Cao then laid siege to Xiapi and launched several attacks but was unable to breach the city walls. As his troops grew weary, Cao Cao considered withdrawing. However, Xun You and Guo Jia advised him, "Lü Bu is brave but foolhardy. His forces' morale is very low after suffering consecutive defeats. An army's morale depends on its commander's will to fight on. Chen Gong is intelligent but slow. Since Lü Bu's army's morale hasn't recovered yet and Chen Gong hasn't finalised his plans yet, you can eventually defeat Lü Bu if you continue attacking him." Cao Cao then ordered his troops to dig ditches and redirect the waters of the Yi and Si rivers to flood Xiapi, flooding the city from three directions. The defenders became demoralized, there would be a mutiny with the city gates opened, Lü Bu surrendered and was executed. (Note: (是歲，太祖自宛征呂布，至下邳，布敗退固守，攻之不拔，連戰，士卒疲，太祖欲還。攸與郭嘉說曰：「呂布勇而無謀，今三戰皆北，其銳氣衰矣。三軍以將為主，主衰則軍無奮意。夫陳宮有智而遲，今及布氣之未復，宮謀之未定，進急攻之，布可拔也。」乃引沂、泗灌城，城潰，生禽布。) Sanguozhi vol. 10.)

=== Battles against the Yuan family ===
In 200 CE, war broke out between Cao Cao and his former ally, the northern warlord Yuan Shao. At the Battle of Boma, Xun You suggested that Cao Cao use a diversionary tactic to eliminate Yuan Shao's general Yan Liang; faking to march across Yan Crossing at the Yellow River as if to attack Yuan Shao's rear then lead lightly armoured troops to Boma. Yuan Shao fell for the ruse and Yan Liang was caught by surprise by Cao Cao's arrival, the battle ended with victory for Cao Cao and Yan Liang's death at the hands of Guan Yu. After the victory at Boma, Cao Cao evacuated Boma with their baggage train along the south banks of the Yellow River, Cao Cao prepared an ambush with troops hidden behind the dykes. Cao Cao's subordinates were worried when Yuan Shao's cavalry, under Wen Chou and Liu Bei arrived and some of Cao Cao's officers suggested gathering the troops to defend the camp. Xun You said, "This is an opportunity to capture the enemy! Why should we retreat?" Cao Cao looked at Xun You and laughed. At the Battle of Yan Ford, when Yuan Shao's soldiers were scrambling for the baggage, Cao Cao sent his infantry and cavalry forces to attack them and scored a major victory; Yuan Shao's general Wen Chou was killed in action with two of Yuan Shao's most famous officers dead in the early skirmishes of the war. Cao Cao then retreated to Guandu (官渡; northeast of present-day Zhongmu County, Henan); Yuan Shao laid siege to Guandu. (Note: (後從救劉延於白馬，攸畫策斬顏良。語在武紀。太祖拔白馬還，遣輜重循河而西。袁紹渡河追，卒與太祖遇。諸將皆恐，說太祖還保營，攸曰：「此所以禽敵，柰何去之！」太祖目攸而笑。遂以輜重餌賊，賊競奔之，陣亂。乃縱步騎擊，大破之，斬其騎將文醜，太祖遂與紹相拒於官渡。) Sanguozhi vol. 10.)

As both sides reached a stalemate at Guandu and Cao Cao's forces struggled for supplies, Xun You advised Cao Cao, "Yuan Shao's supplies will be reaching in one day. Han Xun (韓𦳣), (Note: This officer's name is recorded as "Han Meng" (韓猛) and "Han Ruo" (韓若) in other sources. It is not clear which is the correct one. (Note: (臣松之案諸書，韓𦳣或作韓猛，或云韓若，未詳孰是。) Pei Songzhi's annotation in Sanguozhi vol. 10.)) the officer leading the convoy, tends to underestimate the enemy. He can be easily defeated." (Note: (軍食方盡，攸言於太祖曰：「紹運車旦暮至，其將韓𦳣銳而輕敵，擊可破也。」) Sanguozhi vol. 10.) Xun You also recommended Cao Cao's general Xu Huang to lead the attack on Han Xun. Cao Cao sent Xu Huang and Shi Huan (史渙) to raid Han Xun's depot at Gushi and they burnt the supplies, granting Cao Cao's forces an important morale boost. Later, Yuan Shao's adviser Xu You defected to Cao Cao's side and urged Cao to attack Yuan's supply depot at Wuchao (烏巢; southeast of present-day Yanjin County, Henan), which was guarded by Chunyu Qiong. While Cao Cao's other subordinates were suspicious about Xu You, only Xun You and Jia Xu advised Cao to heed Xu You's suggestion. Cao Cao then ordered Xun You and Cao Hong to remain behind to guard his main camp, while he personally led his forces to attack Wuchao and succeeded in destroying Yuan Shao's supplies. During the battle, Yuan Shao sent Zhang He and Gao Lan (高覽) to attack Cao Cao's main camp at Guandu but Xu You and Cao Hong managed to hold. Seeing the tide had turned, Zhang He and Gao Lan, destroyed their own camps and sought to surrender. Cao Hong felt suspicious and was reluctant to accept their surrender but Xun You told Cao Hong, "Zhang He was angry that Yuan Shao did not listen to him so he decided to defect. (Note: See Zhang He#Defection to Cao Cao.) Sir, what's there to suspect about him?" Cao Hong then accepted their surrender. (Note: (太祖曰：「誰可使？」攸曰：「徐晃可。」乃遣晃及史渙邀擊破走之，燒其輜重。會許攸來降，言紹遣淳于瓊等將萬餘兵迎運糧，將驕卒惰，可要擊也。衆皆疑。唯攸與賈詡勸太祖。太祖乃留攸及曹洪守。太祖自將攻破之，盡斬瓊等。紹將張郃、高覽燒攻櫓降，紹遂棄軍走。郃之來，洪疑不敢受，攸謂洪曰：「郃計不用，怒而來，君何疑？」乃受之。) Sanguozhi vol. 10.)

After Yuan Shao's death in June 202, Cao Cao launched a campaign against Yuan's sons Yuan Tan and Yuan Shang and fought them at the Battle of Liyang but soon the Yuan brothers were at war with each other. In the following year, Cao Cao had marched to attack Liu Biao when he received Yuan Tan's adviser Xin Pi to convey to Cao Cao his wish to surrender and seek aid from Cao in countering his brother. Cao Cao considered accepting Yuan Tan's surrender and sending troops to aid him, and then consulted his advisers. Most of them thought that Liu Biao was more powerful and that Yuan Tan and Yuan Shang posed no threat, so they urged Cao Cao to attack Liu Biao first. Xun You had a different opinion from them. He said, "The Empire has experienced so much turmoil, yet Liu Biao has holed up in the Jiang and Han regions. This shows that he has no intention of expanding his territory. The Yuans occupy four provinces and have 100,000 troops. Yuan Shao had treated his subordinates generously and hoped that his sons would cooperate harmoniously to safeguard his territories; that was why turmoil in the Empire never seemed to end. As of now, relations between the brothers have deteriorated and they seek to destroy each other. If one of them defeats and absorbs the other, he will become more powerful and more difficult to defeat. If you take advantage of their internal conflict to defeat them, you will restore stability in the Empire. You should not miss this great opportunity." Cao Cao agreed, accepted Yuan Tan's surrender and led his forces to Ji and began the campaign that would destroy the Yuan brothers with Yuan Tan defeated and killed at the Battle of Nanpi in 205. (Note: ([建安]七年，從討袁譚、尚於黎陽。明年，太祖方征劉表，譚、尚爭兾州。譚遣辛毗乞降請救，太祖將許之，以問羣下。羣下多以為表彊，宜先平之，譚、尚不足憂也。攸曰：「天下方有事，而劉表坐保江、漢之閒，其無四方志可知矣。袁氏據四州之地，帶甲十萬，紹以寬厚得衆，借使二子和睦以守其成業，則天下之難未息也。今兄弟遘惡，其勢不兩全。若有所并則力專，力專則難圖也。及其亂而取之，天下定矣，此時不可失也。」太祖曰：「善。」乃許譚和親，遂還擊破尚。其後譚叛，從斬譚於南皮。) Sanguozhi vol. 10.)

=== Later life and death ===
After pacifying Ji Province, Cao Cao wrote a memorial to Emperor Xian to recommend him to award Xun You a marquis title to honour him for his contributions, noting "Master of the Army Xún Yōu from the beginning was a great assistant and minister. No campaigns were unsuccessful and from beginning to end all enemies were conquered, all because of Yōu’s plan". (Note: (軍師荀攸，自初佐臣，無征不從，前後克敵，皆攸之謀也) Sanguozhi vol.10.) Xun You was thus enfeoffed as the Marquis of Lingshu Village (陵樹亭侯). In 207, while assessing his subordinates' contributions and recommending Emperor Xian to give out rewards accordingly, Cao Cao credited Xun Yu and Xun You for developing grand strategic plans for him with Xun You second only to Xun Yu. Xun You received an additional 400 taxable households in his marquisate, making it 700 households in total. He was also reassigned to serve as Central Military Adviser (中軍師). (Note: (兾州平，太祖表封攸曰：「軍師荀攸，自初佐臣，無征不從，前後克敵，皆攸之謀也。」於是封陵樹亭侯。十二年，下令大論功行封，太祖曰：「忠正密謀，撫寧內外，文若是也。公達其次也。」增邑四百，并前七百戶，轉為中軍師。) Sanguozhi vol. 10.) The Wei Shu recorded that Cao Cao visited Xun You's residence when he returned from Liucheng (柳城; southwest of present-day Chaoyang, Liaoning) after a campaign. He told Xun You, "Now that the Empire has basically been pacified, it's time for me to share the rewards with virtuous scholar-officials like you. In the past, Emperor Gaozu allowed Zhang Zifang to choose 30,000 taxable households to form his own marquisate. Today, I intend to suggest to the Emperor to let you do the same." (Note: (魏書曰：太祖自柳城還，過攸舍，稱述攸前後謀謨勞勳，曰：「今天下事略已定矣，孤願與賢士大夫共饗其勞。昔高祖使張子房自擇邑三萬戶，今孤亦欲君自擇所封焉。」) Wei Shu annotation in Sanguozhi vol. 10.)

In 213, Xun You was the lead name in the memorial to Emperor Xian calling for the enfeoffing of Cao Cao as the Duke of Wei (魏公), a promotion Xun Yu had opposed before his death. This was granted with Cao Cao granted a dukedom covering parts of present-day Hebei and Henan after Xun You and others opposed plans to only grant a dukedom covering Wei prefecture. (Note: Weishu annotation in Sanguozhi vol.1.) Xun You was appointed as the Prefect of the Masters of Writing (尚書令), replacing the recently deceased Xun Yu who had opposed the dukedom. (Note: (魏國初建，為尚書令。) Sanguozhi vol. 10.) In c.September 214, Xun You accompanied Cao Cao on a campaign against the southern warlord Sun Quan but died of illness along the way. He was 58 (by East Asian age reckoning) when he died. Cao Cao shed tears when he heard of Xun You's death. (Note: (攸從征孫權，道薨。太祖言則流涕。) Sanguozhi vol. 10. Note that when recording Xun You's death, Zizhi Tongjian did not indicate that he accompanied Cao Cao on the campaign against Sun Quan.)

On 6 January 245, the child Emperor Cao Fang and his regents ordered sacrifices for Xun You at Cao Cao's temple while Xun You was posthumously honoured as "Marquis Jing" (敬侯; "respected marquis"); the lateness of these rewards for such an important servant puzzled Pei Songzhi. (Note: (正始中，追謚攸曰敬侯。) Sanguozhi vol. 10.) (Note: Sanguozhi vol.4.) (Note: While Xun You's biography in SGZ does not give a precise date for being awarded a marquis, Cao Fang's biography does for Xun being honoured at Cao Cao's temple. Thus, it would seem reasonable that both honours were bestowed at the same time.)

== Appraisal ==
Xun You was known for being a highly profound and insightful thinker who hid secrets very well. Since he started accompanying Cao Cao on his military campaigns, he had often helped Cao Cao devise and develop strategic plans. Many people, including his family members and relatives, hardly knew what was on his mind or what he had said. (Note: (攸深密有智防，自從太祖征伐，常謀謩帷幄，時人及子弟莫知其所言。) Sanguozhi vol. 10.) The Wei Shu recorded that Xin Tao (辛韜), a son of Xun Yi's sister (and thus Xun You's paternal aunt), once asked Xun You why he urged Cao Cao to attack Ji Province. Xun You replied, "Since Zuozhi has come on behalf of Yuan Tan to surrender, it's expected that the Imperial Army will go there to pacify the area. How would I know why?" Xin Tao and others did not dare to ask Xun You again about state and military affairs after that. (Note: (魏書曰：攸姑子辛韜曾問攸說太祖取兾州時事。攸曰：「佐治為袁譚乞降，王師自往平之，吾何知焉？」自是韜及內外莫敢復問軍國事也。) Wei Shu annotation in Sanguozhi vol. 10.)

Cao Cao often praised Xun You and once said, "Gongda is intelligent but appears foolish; he is courageous but appears cowardly; he is resilient but appears weak. He neither flaunts his talents nor brags about his achievements. You may be as intelligent as him, but you can't pretend to be foolish as well as he does. Even Master Yan and Ning Wu cannot be compared to him." When Cao Pi was still Cao Cao's heir apparent, his father told him, "Xun Gongda is a role model for people. You should treat him courteously and respectfully." When Xun You was ill, Cao Pi visited him and knelt down beside his bed; such was Cao Pi's level of respect for Xun You. Zhong Yao also once said, "Every time I plan something, I'll carefully think through it again and again until I'm certain that I can't make any more changes. However, after consulting Gongda, he always has new insights to offer." Xun You created 12 strategies for Zhong Yao. Zhong Yao died before he managed to finish writing a book about the 12 strategies, hence some of them were lost. (Note: (太祖每稱曰：「公達外愚內智，外怯內勇，外弱內彊，不伐善，無施勞，智可及，愚不可及，雖顏子、寗武不能過也。」文帝在東宮，太祖謂曰：「荀公達，人之師表也，汝當盡禮敬之。」攸曾病，世子問病，獨拜牀下，其見尊異如此。攸與鍾繇善，繇言：「我每有所行，反覆思惟，自謂無以易；以咨公達，輒復過人意。」公達前後凡畫奇策十二，唯繇知之。繇撰集未就，會薨，故世不得盡聞也。) Sanguozhi vol. 10.) (Note: According to Zhu Jianping's biography in Sanguozhi, Zhong Yao, Xun You and Zhu were good friends. Zhu had once predicted that despite being older, Zhong would be the one to take care of Xun's family as the latter would die first. At the time. Zhong laughed it off as a joke. With Xun You's death, Zhong Yao found himself trying to marry off Xun's concubine. Zhong wrote to someone about this; he also praised Zhu's prediction skills.) The historian Pei Songzhi thought it was a huge pity that Xun You's strategies were lost because Zhong Yao died at the age of 79 – some 16 years after Xun You's death – so he probably should have had ample time to finish writing the book. (Note: (臣松之案：攸亡後十六年，鍾繇乃卒，撰攸奇策，亦有何難？而年造八十，猶云未就，遂使攸從征機策之謀不傳於世，惜哉！) Pei Songzhi's annotation in Sanguozhi vol. 10.)

The Wei Shu recorded that Cao Cao once said, "I have travelled with Xun Gongda for over 20 years. I can't find any fault with him." He also said, "Xun Gongda is truly a virtuous man; he fits the saying '(he is) benign, upright, courteous, temperate, and complaisant and thus he gets what he desires.' (Note: This line is quoted from the first book, "Xue Er" (學而), in Confucius's Analects. See James Legge's translation at http://ctext.org/analects/xue-er) He is exactly the man described in this quote by Confucius: 'Yan Ping Zhong knew well how to maintain friendly intercourse. The acquaintance might be long, but he showed the same respect as at first.'" (Note: This line is quoted from the fifth book, "Gongye Chang" (公冶長), in Confucius's Analects. See James Legge's translation at http://ctext.org/analects/gong-ye-chang) (Note: (魏書載太祖令曰：「孤與荀公達周遊二十餘年，無毫毛可非者。」又曰：「荀公達真賢人也，所謂『溫良恭儉讓以得之』。孔子稱『晏平仲善與人交，乆而敬之』，公達即其人也。」) Wei Shu annotation in Sanguozhi vol. 10.)

The Xun Yu Biezhuan (荀彧別傳; Unofficial Biography of Xun Yu) recorded that Cao Cao once commended Xun Yu and Xun You for their excellent judgments about people's talents "The two directors Xun grew ever more reliable in their judgement of men. As long as I live I shall never forget them." (Note: (太祖曰：「二荀令之論人，乆而益信，吾沒世不忘。」) Xun Yu Biezhuan annotation in Sanguozhi vol. 10.)

The Fu Zi mentioned that someone, who lived around the same time as Xun You, once asked if there were any virtuous junzis in their time. He received an answer as follows: "The benevolence of Lord Prefect Xun (Yu) and the intelligence of Military Adviser Xun (You) make them worthy of being called virtuous junzis of our time. Lord Prefect Xun is benevolent and virtuous, he displays wisdom in recommending talents, his personal conduct is flawless, and he is capable of adapting his strategies to suit changes. Meng Ke once said, 'It is a rule that a true royal sovereign should arise in the course of five hundred years, and that during that time there should be men illustrious in their generation.' (Note: This line is quoted from Mencius. See James Legge's translation at http://ctext.org/mengzi/gong-sun-chou-ii) Lord Prefect Xun is one of such men. As Taizu once said, 'Lord Prefect Xun provides advice and doesn't stop providing advice; Military Adviser Xun eliminates evil and doesn't stop eliminating evil.'" (Note: (傅子曰：或問近世大賢君子，荅曰：「荀令君之仁，荀軍師之智，斯可謂近世大賢君子矣。荀令君仁以立德，明以舉賢，行無諂黷，謀能應機。孟軻稱『五百年而有王者興，其間必有命世者』，其荀令君乎！太祖稱『荀令君之進善，不進不休，荀軍師之去惡，不去不止』也。」) Fu Zi annotation in Sanguozhi vol. 10.) It would be a comparison that would later be used to praise Xun Xu.

Xun Yu's philosopher son Xun Can considered Xun You superior to his father as someone “unconcerned with externals – a completely cautious and secluded man”. (Note: (又論父彧不如從兄攸。彧立德高整，軌儀以訓物，而攸不治外形，慎密自居而已。粲以此言善攸，諸兄怒而不能迴也。) Xun Can Zhuan annotation from Sanguozhi vol. 10.) Howard Goodman explains this was partly to provoke his brothers on factional lines, with Can married into the Cao family and other members of the Xun clan leaning towards the Sima family, and partly a philosophical position where Xun You seemed like a good mode for a mystery adapt, above the norms of society and politics.

Chen Shou, who wrote Xun You's biography in the Sanguozhi, appraised him as follows: “Xun You and Jia Xu were very detailed in their strategising and had never miscalculated before. However, in terms of adaptability and flexibility, they were second to (Zhang) Liang and (Chen) Ping.”. (Note: (評曰： ... 荀攸、賈詡，庶乎筭無遺策，經達權變，其良、平之亞與！) Sanguozhi vol. 10.) Chen Shou in another grouping of Cao Cao's advisers compared them as planners but felt they were of lesser character. (Note: (程昱、郭嘉、董昭、劉曄、蔣濟才策謀略，世之奇士，雖清治德業，殊於荀攸，而籌畫所料，是其倫也) Sanguozhi vol.14.) On the other hand, Pei Songzhi felt Xun You's moral character was far superior to Jia Xu and so they should not have been placed together by Chen Shou. (Note: (且攸、詡之為人，其猶夜光之與蒸燭乎！其照雖均，質則異焉。今荀、賈之評，共同一稱，尤失區別之宜也) Pei Songzhi's commentary in Sanguozhi vol.10.)

== Family ==
Xun You had at least three sons. (Note: The name of Xun Biao's father was not recorded in history. He was most probably not Xun Ji's son because Xun Ji died before Xun You. Otherwise he, as Xun You's eldest son, should have inherited Xun You's marquis title instead of Xun You's second son Xun Shi. Since Xun Shi had no son, then Xun Biao's father was probably another son of Xun You. Therefore, Xun You had at least three sons.) The eldest, Xun Ji (荀緝), resembled his father in character but died early. The second, Xun Shi (荀適), inherited his father's title "Marquis of Lingshu Village" (陵樹亭侯) and had no son to succeed him when he died. In the early Huangchu era (220–226) of Cao Pi's reign, Xun You's grandson, Xun Biao (荀彪), inherited the title "Marquis of Lingshu Village" and received 300 taxable households to form his marquisate. His title was later changed to "Marquis of Qiuyang Village" (丘陽亭侯). (Note: (長子緝，有攸風，早沒。次子適嗣，無子，絕。黃初中，紹封攸孫彪為陵樹亭侯，邑三百戶，後轉封丘陽亭侯。) Sanguozhi vol. 10.)

== In Romance of the Three Kingdoms ==
In the classic 14th century novel Romance of the Three Kingdoms by Luo Guanzhong, Xun You joins Cao Cao earlier than in history, when Cao Cao took over Yan province in 192. He is the nephew of Xun Yu, and they join at the same time as Cao Cao begins recruiting advisers but with Xun Yu more prominent. The novel uses Xun You's historical advice but adds some more.

Xun You suggests Kong Rong as a diplomat to Liu Biao which leads to Kong Rong recommending Mi Heng. When Cao Cao falls out with Mi Heng, Cao Cao lists Xun You as a hero of the time, but Mi Heng dismisses Xun You as someone fit only to watch graves, likely a nod to the Zhang Quan incident of his youth. After the burning of Wuchao, proposes spreading rumours that Cao Cao was marching on key areas to force Yuan Shao to split his forces and then attack Yuan Shao's main force. In the wars against the Yuan sons, recommends using recently surrendered Lü Kuang (呂曠) and Lü Xiang (呂翔) to fake surrender to Gao Gan after initial struggles in 206, leading to Gao Gan's destruction.

Helps Cao Cao discover a bronze board and sees it as a good omen for a war southwards but persuades Cao Cao to rest his troops rather than immediately attack Liu Biao. When Jing collapses to Cao Cao in 208 after the delay, Xun You is not happy with the surrendered Cai Mao and Zhang Yun (張允) getting such high ranks, urges Cao Cao to seize Jiangling before Liu Bei can take it. In the build up to the Battle of Red Cliffs, recommends proposing to Sun Quan that they hunt Liu Bei and that Sun Quan would be too scared to oppose, Sun Quan refused. During the campaign itself, suggests sending the relatives of the recently Cai Mao as spies via a false defection, but the Sun commander Zhou Yu sees through this and uses them to feed Cao Cao false information. Agrees with Cheng Yu that fire is a risk but persuaded by Cao Cao the weather would mean a fire-attack is impossible on his fleet. The fleet would be burnt via the false defection of Huang Gai and the incorrect information provided by Xun You's recommended spies.

In 211 as the Liang warlords led by Ma Chao fight to avenge Ma Teng's assassination by Cao Cao, Xun You tries to hastily construct a fort to secure Cao Cao's position using soil, but it keeps collapsing. In 214, he opposes the idea of Cao Cao becoming King of Wei as no further promotion from Duke is justifiable. An angry Cao Cao notes the comparison with Xun Yu's objection and death; an angry Xun You then falls ill and dies soon after. He is buried with full honours, while Cao Cao drops the idea of being King for a short time. Xun You does not get a poem as many major characters do in the novel.

== See also ==
- Lists of people of the Three Kingdoms
