= Chen Qun =

Chinese state of Cao Wei minister (died 237)

- 陳群

Manager of the Affairs of the Masters of Writing (錄尚書事)
- In office 227 – 7 February 237
- Monarch: Cao Rui
- In office ? – 226
- Monarch: Cao Pi

Minister of Works (司空)
- In office January or February 227 – 7 February 237
- Monarch: Cao Rui
- Preceded by: Wang Lang
- Succeeded by: Wei Zhen

Senior General Who Guards the Army (鎮軍大將軍)
- In office ? – January or February 227
- Monarch: Cao Pi

Prefect of the Masters of Writing (尚書令)
- In office 220 – ?
- Monarch: Cao Pi

Supervisor of the Masters of Writing (尚書僕射)
- In office 220 – ?
- Monarch: Cao Pi

Personal details
- Born: Unknown (Note: Although Chen Qun's birth year is not recorded, his biography in Sanguozhi indicated that his grandfather Chen Shi (died in Sept 186) lived to see his childhood, and that he was younger than Kong Rong (born in 153). Thus, his birth year should be between 153 and 180.) Xuchang, Henan
- Died: 7 February 237 (Note: Cao Rui's biography in the Sanguozhi recorded that Chen Qun died on the guisi day of the 12th month of the 4th year of the Qinglong era of Cao Rui's reign. This date corresponds to 7 February 237 in the Gregorian calendar.) Luoyang, Henan
- Spouse: Xun Yu's daughter
- Relations: see Chen clan of Yingchuan
- Children: Chen Tai; Chen Zuo; Chen Tan
- Parent: Chen Ji (father)
- Occupation: Politician
- Courtesy name: Changwen (長文)
- Posthumous name: Marquis Jing (靖侯)
- Peerage: Marquis of Yingyin (潁陰侯)

Chen Qun (died 7 February 237), courtesy name Changwen, was a Chinese politician of the state of Cao Wei during the Three Kingdoms period of China. He initiated the Nine-rank system for civil service nomination in Wei. Following the death of the first Wei emperor Cao Pi, Chen Qun, along with Sima Yi and Cao Zhen, nominated Cao Pi's son, Cao Rui, to be the new emperor.

== Early life ==
Chen Qun was born in the illustrious Chen family of Yingchuan Commandery (潁川郡), which is around present-day Xuchang, Henan. His grandfather Chen Shi, father Chen Ji and uncle Chen Chen (陳諶) all held high offices in the central government of the Eastern Han dynasty. As a child, he was already recognised as a talent by his grandfather Chen Shi, who told the elders in the clan, "This child will make our clan prosper!". When he was older, Kong Rong, a descendant of Confucius and close friend of his father Chen Ji, became friends with Chen Qun as well, thus making Chen Qun famous.

In the days when Liu Bei was nominally the Inspector of Yu Province (where Yingchuan Commandery was located), Chen Qun became a subordinate of Liu Bei. He tried to dissuade Liu Bei from succeeding Tao Qian as the Governor of Xu Province after Tao died in 194 because he believed that whoever controlled Xu Province would be under threat from rival warlords: Yuan Shu to the south and Lü Bu to the west. Liu Bei ignored his advice and assumed office as the Governor of Xu Province, but he soon lost the province to Lü Bu. Liu Bei was said to have regretted not listening to Chen Qun.

== Service under Cao Cao ==
In 198, the warlord Cao Cao, who was the de facto head of the Han central government, led his forces to attack Lü Bu in Xu Province and defeated him at the Battle of Xiapi, after which he took control of the province. Chen Qun and his father Chen Ji, who were both previously subordinates of Lü Bu, surrendered to Cao Cao and entered the service of the central government in the Han imperial capital, Xuchang.

Chen Qun made accusations against Guo Jia, one of Cao Cao's trusted advisers, on a number of occasions because he was unhappy with Guo Jia's unbridled ways. Although Cao Cao was pleased to see that Chen Qun upheld his moral principles, he did not take action against Guo Jia since Guo Jia's advice was crucial to Cao Cao's victories in battles against rival warlords.

In 216, Emperor Xian, the figurehead Han emperor, was forced by Cao Cao to enfeoff him as a vassal king under the title "King of Wei". Cao Cao then sought Chen Qun's opinion on reestablishing an abolished system of corporal punishment within the Wei kingdom since he knew that Chen Qun's father, Chen Shi, supported capital punishment when he was still alive on the grounds that corporal punishment was more humane than bodily mutilation as a legal punishment. Chen Qun, however, favoured bodily mutilation because he thought that it provided more flexibility in the administration of justice, being more lenient than the death penalty yet less lenient than corporal punishment. Zhong Yao, another senior official, also shared the same view as Chen Qun, but others such as Wang Lang strongly objected to corporal punishment. Cao Cao ultimately did not reestablish the system of corporal punishment. Sometime between 216 and 220, Chen Qun urged Cao Cao to usurp the throne from Emperor Xian and become emperor himself, since Cao Cao was already the de facto ruler of the Han Empire at the time, but Cao Cao refused and remained as a nominal subject of Emperor Xian until his death.

== Life in the state of Cao Wei ==
=== Service under Cao Pi ===
In late 220, some months after Cao Cao's death, Cao Pi (Cao Cao's son and successor) forced Emperor Xian to abdicate in his favour and established the state of Cao Wei to replace the Han dynasty, with himself as the new emperor. He enfeoffed Chen Qun as the Marquis of Changwu Village and appointed him as a Master of Writing in the government. At some point during Cao Pi's reign, Chen Qun submitted to him a proposal to create the nine-rank system of civil service, where posts in all Cao Wei-occupied cities and commanderies would be filled by people of high potential. Cao Pi approved of this proposal, and the nine-rank system would be enshrined in the laws of Cao Wei and last until the Song dynasty.

Chen Qun unsuccessfully pleaded with Cao Pi to pardon Bao Xun, who deliberately hid a report by Liu Yao (刘曜) that implicated Sun Yong (孙邕) in a potentially dangerous breach of protocol when the latter visited Cao Pi.

In 226, when Cao Pi became critically ill, he entrusted his son and heir apparent, Cao Rui, to the care of Cao Zhen, Sima Yi, and Chen Qun.

=== Service under Cao Rui ===
In 226, Chen Qun stopped Cao Rui from attending his father's funeral on the grounds of protecting Cao Rui from contracting an unknown disease in the hot summer.

When one of Cao Rui's daughters died prematurely before she even reached one year old, Chen Qun did not want the emperor to attend the funeral because the emperor's presence at funerals was only necessary if the deceased was at least eight years of age. Cao Rui nonetheless ignored Chen Qun's advice and attended his daughter's funeral.

Many of Cao Rui's subjects, including Chen Qun, were concerned about the excessive costs of the construction of the emperor's lavish palaces and ancestral temples. Chen Qun wrote several memorials to the emperor, seeking a reduction in the scale of these projects and eventually managed to convince him to do so.

Chen Qun died on 7 February 237. One of his sons, Chen Tai, inherited his marquis title and marquisate and became a prominent military general in the Cao Wei state later.

== Appraisal ==
It has been said that in his career, Chen Qun was not affected by his personal preferences in deciding whether a policy had merit or not. In his life, Chen Qun was very much concerned with honour and righteousness, and he was also esteemed as a good judge of character.

== See also ==
- Lists of people of the Three Kingdoms
