= Xun Yu =

Han dynasty military official and statesman (163–212)

- 荀彧
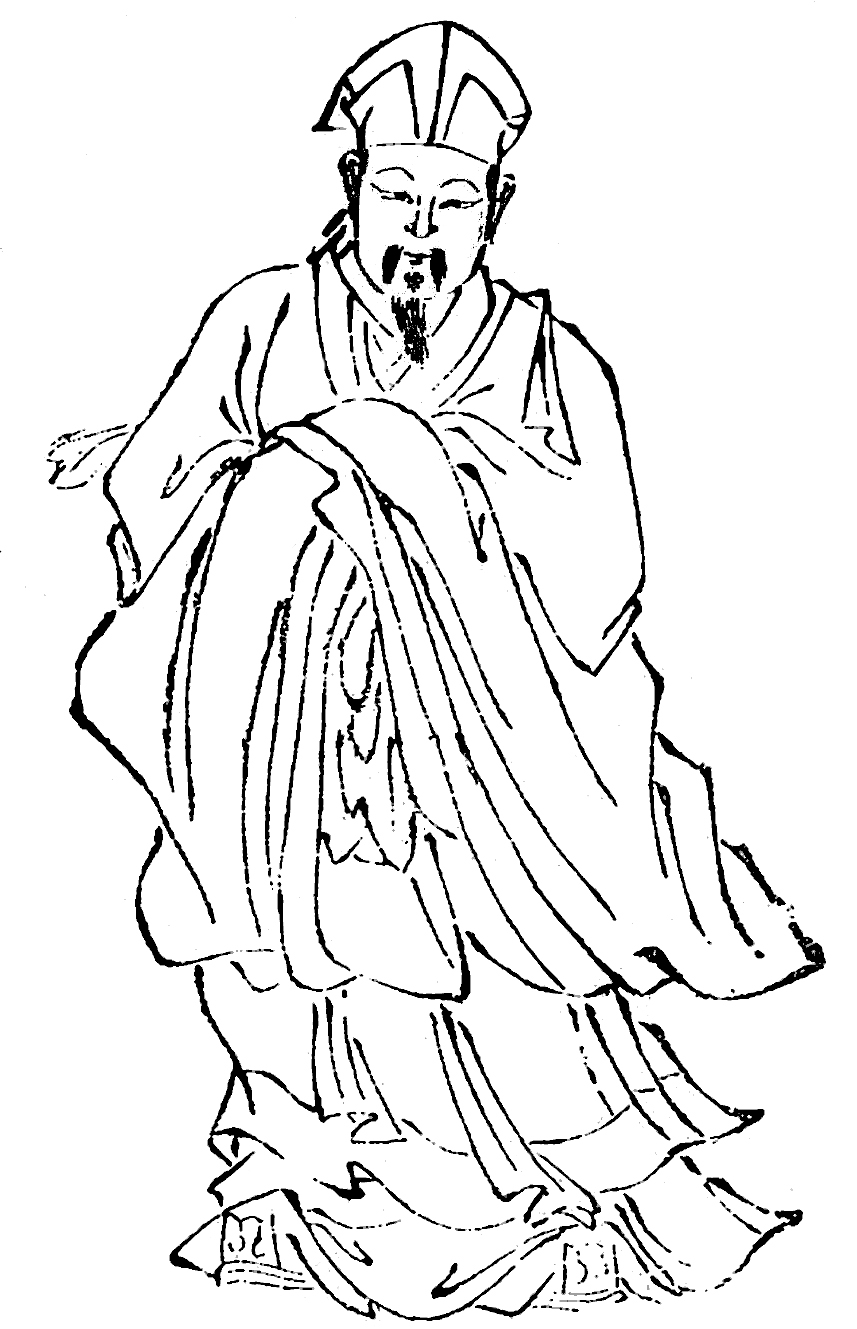
- A Qing dynasty illustration of Xun Yu (1734)

Prefect of the Masters of Writing (尚書令) (acting)
- In office 196 – 212
- Monarch: Emperor Xian of Han
- Chancellor: Cao Cao
- Succeeded by: Hua Xin

Personal details
- Born: 163 Xuchang, Henan
- Died: between November 212 and February 213 (aged 49) Shou County, Anhui
- Spouse(s): possibly Lady Tang; Xun Yi's mother
- Children: Xun Yun; Xun Yu; Xun Shen; Xun Yi; Xun Can; Chen Qun's wife; another two unnamed sons
- Parent: Xun Gun (father)
- Occupation: Military official, politician
- Courtesy name: Wenruo (文若)
- Posthumous name: Marquis Jing (敬侯)
- Peerage: Marquis of Wansui Village (萬歲亭侯)

Xun Yu (163–212), courtesy name Wenruo, was a Chinese military official and politician who served as an adviser to the warlord Cao Cao during the late Eastern Han dynasty of China. He served as acting Prefect of the Masters of Writing from 196 until his death, helping administer the Han court at Xu while Cao Cao was on campaign.

== Early life ==
Xun Yu was from Yingchuan Commandery (around present-day Xuchang, Henan), and was born into a family of government officials. He was described in historical records as a tall and handsome gentleman. His grandfather Xun Shu (荀淑) served as a local governor and had eight sons who were nicknamed the "Eight Dragons of the Xun Family"; an uncle of Xun Yu, Xun Shuang, served as one of the Three Ducal Ministers, while Xun Yu's father Xun Gun was the chancellor of the principality of Jibei.

Xun Yu proved to be a talented youth and was evaluated by the scholar He Yong as "someone capable of assisting kings" (王佐之才). In 189, he was nominated as a xiaolian (civil service candidate) and began his career in the civil service. When the warlord Dong Zhuo seized control of the capital Luoyang, Xun Yu feared for his safety and resigned, returning to Ji Province (present-day Hebei).

In the subsequent years, warlords quickly rose in each region; Xun Yu first served Yuan Shao, whose power base was in Ji Province, but later left him and went to serve Cao Cao in 191. Cao Cao recognised Xun Yu's talent and he exclaimed, "Here comes my Zifang! (Note: "Zifang" was the courtesy name of Zhang Liang, a prominent advisor to Emperor Gao. Zhang Liang contributed greatly to the founding of the Han dynasty, and was named one of the "Three prominences of the early Han dynasty" (漢初三傑), the other two being Han Xin and Xiao He .)" When Xun Yu arrived, he appointed Xun as an army commandant.

== Service under Cao Cao ==
Xun Yu's contributions to Cao Cao's forces and administration are immense. On one hand he recommended many other men of calibre to Cao Cao, including Xun You (his second cousin-nephew), Chen Qun, Zhong Yao, Guo Jia and Sima Yi, creating a body of advisors around Cao; at the same time he participated in several battles and major events of the era, often giving timely advice to his lord. Cao Cao, in turn, respected Xun Yu greatly and placed a great store in his advice.

In 194, as Cao Cao led a campaign against Tao Qian in Xu Province, his home base at Yan Province was suddenly attacked by Lü Bu. Two of Cao's officials, Chen Gong and Zhang Miao, chose to defect to Lü Bu. At that time Xun Yu was in charge of the defences of Juancheng (鄄城), and his firm actions saved the city from capture, allowing Cao Cao's armies to return and drive away Lü Bu. Subsequently, on the death of Tao Qian, Cao Cao was tempted to turn around and move to Xu Province before returning to deal with Lü Bu; it was Xun Yu who dissuaded him from this, reminding him that Yan Province was his heartland and power base and should be secured first before launching campaigns abroad.

It was also at Xun Yu's suggestion that Cao Cao chose to escort Emperor Xian, who was then living in the ruins of Luoyang, to his base at Xu (present-day Xuchang, Henan) in 196, taking on the role of protecting the emperor. Xun Yu's plan was to "control the insubordinate in the name of the emperor" (奉天子以令不臣); the 14th-century historical novel Romance of the Three Kingdoms subtly distorts this to "hold the emperor hostage to control the nobles" (挾天子以令諸侯). In the long run, this strategy would give Cao Cao a considerable political advantage over his rivals, allowing him to legitimise his actions by taking them in the emperor's name.

In 200, Cao Cao was locked in a stalemate against Yuan Shao at the Battle of Guandu for months, eventually exhausting his food supply; while contemplating retreat he sent a letter to Xun Yu (who was then defending Xu) for advice. Xun Yu dissuaded Cao Cao with a letter, highlighting several advantages that his army held over Yuan Shao's forces and urging him to stand fast; the eventual result was a decisive victory for Cao Cao, which was crucial to his domination of northern China.

== Death and posthumous honors ==
In 212, Dong Zhao and a group of Cao Cao loyalists submitted a memorial to Emperor Xian proposing that Cao should be granted the title of a duke. This proposal was significant as it would allow Cao Cao to set up a self-contained feudal state within the Han dynasty. Up to this point, Cao Cao's political legitimacy was only underpinned by his position as the chancellor. Xun Yu, whose ideals were for Cao Cao to continue being the protector of the Han dynasty, opposed Dong Zhao's proposal.

Knowing that Dong Zhao was probably a conduit for Cao Cao when approached by the former for his support, Xun Yu told Dong that Cao's personal mission was one of restoring the Han dynasty and would not approve of such a move – thus possibly hinting to Cao that he should abandon the idea. Xun Yu's remarks greatly displeased Cao Cao.

Following this, Xun Yu was sent to Qiao to reward the soldiers who took part in a military campaign against Sun Quan in c.November 212. While there, Xun Yu was said to have fallen sick and was brought to Shouchun (寿春; present-day Shou County, Anhui) for treatment and recuperation. He died later that year (late 212 or early 213). The circumstances of his death aroused great suspicion and is a matter of debate as it came closely after his opposition towards Cao Cao's ascension to duke. (Note: Eventually, Cao Cao was made Duke of Wei on 16 Jun 213 in the Julian calendar; the annals of Emperor Xian in Houhanshu also recorded the same date.) (Note: In his Zizhi Tongjian Kaoyi, Sima Guang noted that both Xun Yu's biography in Houhanshu and Sun Sheng's Wei Shi Chun Qiu recorded that Xun Yu poisoned himself. Sima opinioned that Chen Shou's account of Xun "dying due to fear" in Xun's biography in Sanguozhi was to hide Cao Cao's involvement in the whole affair; Cao likely ordered Xun to be executed. Thus, he recorded that Xun poisoned himself in Tongjian; if not, Sima feared that future leaders may follow Cao Cao's example and commit similar secret executions.)

Xun Yu was given the posthumous name "Jing" (敬). More than 50 years after his death, in 265, he was posthumously granted the title of Grand Commandant.

== Family ==
- Ancestor: Xun Zi (Note: Xun Shu was an 11th generation descendant of Xun Zi.)
- Grandfather: Xun Shu (荀淑; 83-149), served as Prefect of Langling
- Father: Xun Gun (緄), served as Chancellor of Jinan
- Uncles:
  - Xun Jian (荀儉)
  - Xun Jing (荀靖)
  - Xun Dao (荀燾)
  - Xun Wang (荀汪)
  - Xun Shuang (荀爽), served as Chancellor of Pingyuan, Minister of the Household, and Excellency of Works
  - Xun Su (荀肅)
  - Xun Fu (荀旉)
- Siblings:
  - Xun Yan (荀衍), third brother
  - Xun Chen (荀諶), fourth brother, served Yuan Shao, persuaded Han Fu to surrender, fate unknown after the Battle of Guandu
- Spouse: Lady Tang (唐氏), (Note: Pei Songzhi expressed his skepticism at Dianlve's account of Xun Gun marrying Xun Yu to Tang Heng's daughter willingly. He pointed out that Yuan Hong's Houhanji recorded that Tang Heng died in the 7th year of the Yanxi era of Emperor Huan's reign. At the time, Xun Yu was about two years old (by East Asian reckoning). If Xun Gun wanted to rely on Tang Heng's power and influence, then it didn't make sense for him to marry a son when Tang Heng did not have long to live. Also, Pei felt that with Xun Gun's reputation, it was more reasonable to assume that he was forced into accepting this marriage.) daughter of Tang Heng (唐衡; died 164) (Note: Tang Heng was a eunuch who has a biography in vol.78 of Houhanshu; the biography indicated that Tang Heng died in the 7th year of the Yanxi era of Emperor Huan's reign. As such, this "daughter" of Tang Heng was probably adopted.)
- Sons:
  - Xun Yun (荀惲), served as Rapid as Tigers General of the Household, married Cao Cao's daughter Princess Anyang, died at a young age
  - Xun Yu (荀俁), served as Palace Assistant Imperial Clerk
  - Xun Shen (荀詵), served as General-in-Chief's Assistant Officer, died at a young age
  - Xun Yi (荀顗), rose to the position of Grand Commandant during the Jin dynasty, posthumously honoured as Duke Kang of Linhuai
  - Xun Can (荀粲), a scholar and xuanxue philosopher, married Cao Hong's daughter
- Son-in-law: Chen Qun, served the state of Wei, initiator of the nine-rank system
- First cousins:
  - Xun Yue (荀悅), a historian of Later Han and the son of Xun Jian
  - Xun Cai (荀采), daughter of Xun Shuang who was married to Yin Yu (陰瑜)
  - Xun Fei (荀棐), Xun Xu's grandfather and son of Xun Shuang
- Other cousins:
  - Xun Xu (荀勗), grandson of Xun Fei, and an influential minister to the first Emperor in the Jin dynasty, Sima Yan. Xun Xu's sons also became high ministers and his grandsons served under Eastern Jin.
- Second cousin-nephew: Xun You, one of Cao Cao's advisors
- Grandsons:
  - Xun Han (荀甝), oldest son of Xun Yun, granted the title of Marquis of Guangyangxiang, died at the age of 30
  - Xun Yi (荀霬), the second son of Xun Yun, married Sima Yi's daughter Princess Nanyang (南陽公主), served as a general, posthumously granted title of Marquis of Zhen
  - Xun Yu (荀寓), son of Xun Yu (荀俁), served as Imperial Secretary during the Jin dynasty
  - Chen Tai (陳泰), son of Chen Qun, participated in Cao Wei counterattacks on Jiang Wei's campaigns
- Great-grandsons:
  - Xun Jun (荀頵), son of Xun Han, served as Right Inspector of the Feathered Forest Imperial Guard, died at a young age
  - Xun Dan (荀憺), oldest son of Xun Yi (荀霬), served as Minister Steward
  - Xun Kai (荀愷), second son of Xun Yi (荀霬), served as General Who Conquers the West during the Jin dynasty
  - Xun Kui (荀悝), third son of Xun Yi (荀霬), served as Protector General of the Army, posthumously appointed General of Chariots and Cavalry
  - Xun Yu (荀羽), son of Xun Yu (荀寓), served as Imperial Secretary
- Descendants:
  - Xun Song (荀崧), son of Xun Jun, served as a Household Counsellor
    - Xun Guan (荀灌), daughter of Xun Song
    - Xun Xian (荀羨), son of Xun Song, served as North General of the Household, and Governor of Xu and Yan provinces
      - Xun Bozi (荀伯子), grandson of Xun Xian, served as a Palace Assistant Imperial Clerk during the Liu Song dynasty, author of the Xun Family Records (荀氏家傳)

== In popular culture ==
In Koei's video game Dynasty Warriors 7: Empires, fans voted in the Facebook and Twitter poll for one of the new officers to have the name Xun Yu. Xun Yu became a playable character in Koei's Dynasty Warriors 8: Empires.

In Koei's Kessen II, Xun Yu plays a prominent role, although the character is portrayed as a woman who harbours a requited love for Cao Cao. In the visual novel and anime series Koihime Musō, Jun'iku (Xun Yu's Japanese name) also serves as a strategist to Sōsō (Cao Cao) and has a huge crush on her.

In Wizards of the Coast's Magic the Gathering Card Game, Xun Yu has a Magic Card "Xun Yu, Wei Advisor" from a set called Portal Three Kingdoms. He is shown opening a container in his artwork and wearing traditional clothing for an advisor from the Han dynasty. His quote says, "A splendid talent, admired of all men! His folly lay in serving Cao Cao's Power."

Xun Yu appeared in Total War: Three Kingdoms, serving under Han Fu before joining Cao Cao.

== See also ==
- Lists of people of the Three Kingdoms
