= Yingchuan Commandery =

Chinese Warring States commandery

Yingchuan Commandery (Chinese: 潁川郡) was a Chinese commandery from the Warring States period to Tang dynasty, located in modern central Henan province. The name referred to the Ying River, which flowed through its territory.

The commandery was established by the state of Qin after it conquered Hán. The seat was Yangdi (陽翟, modern Yuzhou, Henan), which, according to legend, was the capital of Yu the Great, and was the capital of the Warring States era State of Han. After the establishment of Hàn dynasty, it originally became Xin, King of Hán's fief. However, Xin was soon moved to Taiyuan, and the commandery was restored. In 2 AD, it administered 20 counties: Yangdi, Kunyang (昆陽), Yingyang (潁陽), Dingling (定陵), Changshe (長社), Xinji (新汲), Xiangcheng (襄城), Yan (郾), Jia (郟), Wuyang (舞陽), Yingyin (潁陰), Chonggao (崇高), Xu (許), Yanling (傿陵), Linying (臨潁), Fucheng (父城), Cheng'an (成安), Zhouchengxiu (周承休), Yangcheng (陽城), and Guanshi (綸氏). The population was 2,210,973, in 432,491 households. In eastern Han dynasty, the commandery administered 17 counties. The population was 1,436,513 in 140 AD, in 263,440 households.

During Emperor Xian of Han's reign, the imperial court was moved to Xu, the home city of Cao Cao, as did the seat of the commandery. In Jin dynasty, Xiangcheng Commandery was formed from the southern part of Yingchuan. 9 Counties remained in Yingchuan. According to the Book of Jin, the commandery had 28,300 households.

In Northern Wei, several new commanderies was established in the area. They were administered by Ying Prefecture (潁州, established in 535), later renamed Zheng (鄭州), and in Northern Zhou, again to Xu (許州).

In Sui and Tang dynasties, the original commanderies were abolished and Yingchuan Commandery became an alternative name of Xu Prefecture. It administered 9 counties, and in 741, the population was 487,864, in 73,347 households.
