= Liu Bei =

Emperor of Shu Han from 221 to 223

Emperor Zhaolie of Han 漢昭烈帝
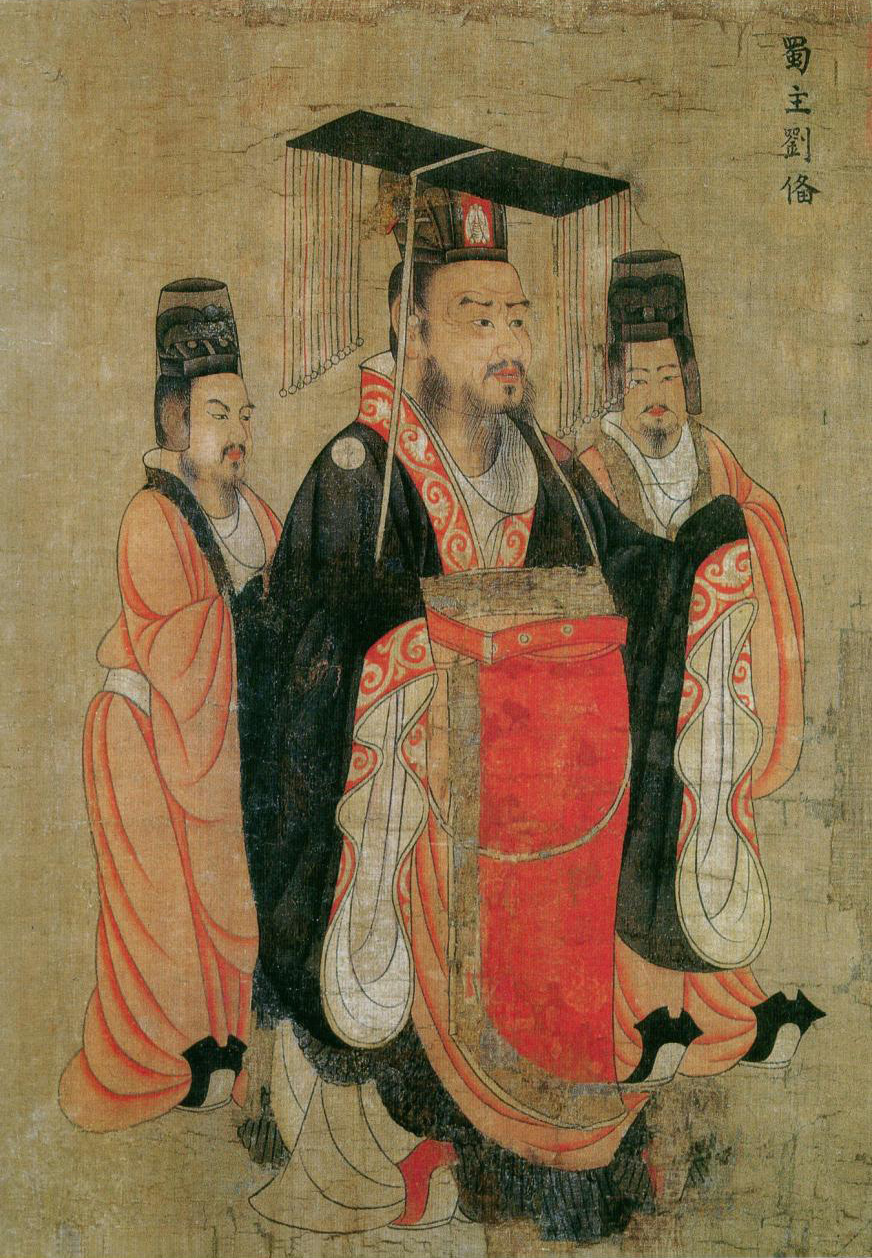
- Tang dynasty portrait of Liu Bei by Yan Liben

Emperor of Shu Han
- Reign: 15 May 221 (Note: The Zizhi Tongjian indicated that Liu Bei crowned himself on the bingwu day of the 4th month of the 2nd year of Cao Pi's reign. The date corresponds to 15 May 221 in the Julian calendar.) – 10 June 223
- Successor: Liu Shan

King of Hanzhong (漢中王) (under the Eastern Han)
- Tenure: July or August 219 (Note: According to Liu Xie's biography in Book of the Later Han, Liu Bei proclaimed himself King of Hanzhong on the gengzi day of the 7th month of the 24th year of the Jian'an era. However, there is no gengzi day in the month; the month corresponds to 30 Jul to 27 Aug 219 on the Julian calendar. Vol.68 of Zizhi Tongjian recorded that Liu Bei proclaimed himself King of Hanzhong in the 7th month of that year.) – 15 May 221
- Born: 161; Zhuo County, Zhuo Commandery, Han Empire (present-day Zhuozhou, Baoding, Hebei)
- Died: 10 June 223 (aged 62) (Note: The Chronicles of Huayang and Liu Bei's biography in Sanguozhi both recorded that Liu Bei died at the age of 63 (by East Asian age reckoning). (Note: (夏四月，先主殂於永安宮，時年六十三。) Huayang Guo Zhi, vol.06) Liu Bei's biography in the Sanguozhi recorded that he died on the guisi day of the 4th month of the 3rd year of the Zhangwu era of his reign. (Note: ([章武三年]夏四月癸巳，先主殂於永安宮，時年六十三。) Sanguozhi, vol.32) However, there was no guisi day in the fourth month. In the next paragraph, Zhuge Liang in a letter to Liu Shan says that Liu Bei died on the 24th of the month, which would have been a xinsi day (10 June 223 in the Julian calendar). (Note: (今月二十四日奄忽升遐，臣妾號咷，若喪考妣。) Sanguozhi, vol. 32)); Baidicheng, Shu Han
- Burial: Hui Mausoleum, Chengdu, Sichuan
- Spouse: Empress Zhaolie Lady Mi Lady Sun Empress Mu
- Issue (among others): Liu Shan, Emperor Huai of Han Liu Yong, Prince of Ganling Liu Li, Prince Dao of Anping at least two daughters
Names
- Family name: Liu (劉); Given name: Bei (備); Courtesy name: Xuande (玄德)
Era name and dates
- Zhangwu (章武): 221–223
Posthumous name
- Emperor Zhaolie (昭烈皇帝)
Temple name
- Liezu (烈祖)
- House: House of Liu
- Dynasty: Shu Han
- Father: Liu Hong
- Military career
- Allegiance: Eastern Han; Shu Han
- Conflicts: Yellow Turban Rebellion; Campaign against Dong Zhuo; Invasion of Xu Province; Campaign against Yuan Shu; Battle of Xiapi; Battle of Guandu; Battle of Bowang; Battle of Changban; Battle of Red Cliffs; Battle of Jiangling; Invasion of Yi Province; Territorial dispute in Jing Province; Hanzhong Campaign; Battle of Xiaoting

Liu Bei
- "Liu Bei" in Traditional (top) and Simplified (bottom) Chinese characters
- Traditional Chinese: 劉備
- Simplified Chinese: 刘备
Transcriptions
Standard Mandarin
- Hanyu Pinyin: Liú Bèi
- Wade–Giles: Liu^{2} Pei^{4}
- IPA: [ljǒʊ pêɪ]
Yue: Cantonese
- Yale Romanization: Làuh Beih
- Jyutping: Lau^{4} Bei^{6}
- IPA: [lɐw˩ pej˨]
Southern Min
- Tâi-lô: Lâu Pī

Alternative Chinese name
- Chinese: 玄德
- Literal meaning: (courtesy name)
Transcriptions
Standard Mandarin
- Hanyu Pinyin: Xuándé
- Wade–Giles: Hsüan^{2}-te^{2}
- IPA: [ɕɥɛ̌ntɤ̌]
Yue: Cantonese
- Yale Romanization: Yùhn-dāk
Southern Min
- Tâi-lô: Hiân-tik

Liu Bei (Chinese: 劉備,; Mandarin pronunciation: [ljǒʊ pêɪ]; 161 – 10 June 223 AD), courtesy name Xuande (玄德), was a Chinese warlord in the late Eastern Han dynasty who later became the founding emperor of Shu Han, one of the Three Kingdoms of China.

While unable to establish a permanent foothold in northern China, he gathered support among opponents of Cao Cao, the warlord who controlled the Han central government and the figurehead Emperor Xian, and was eventually able to carve out his own realm, which at its peak spanned present-day Sichuan, Chongqing, Guizhou, Hunan, and parts of Hubei, Yunnan, and Gansu.

Bolstered by the widespread influence of the 14th-century historical novel Romance of the Three Kingdoms and its portrayal of Liu Bei as an exemplar of virtuous Confucian rule, Liu Bei is widely revered in China and other East Asian societies as an ideal benevolent and humane ruler. Historically speaking, his style of governance has been said to have been "Confucian in appearance but Legalist in substance". (Note: (儒表法里; 儒表法裡; rú biǎo fǎ lǐ; ju^{²} piao^{³} fa^{³} li^{³}), A aniI idiom describing a style of governing which had become the norm after the founding of the Han dynasty.) (Note: Throughout Chinese history, no successful emperor had ruled purely based on Confucianism (though some did purely use Legalism). Numerous studies such as Political Reality of Transforming Legalism by Confucianism in the Western Han Dynasty as Seen from Selection System by Wang Baoding, or Aspects of Legalist Philosophy and the Law in Ancient China: The Chi'an and Han Dynasties and Rediscovered Manuscript of Mawangdui and Shuihudi by Matthew August LeFande, have pointed out most ancient Chinese dynasties after Qin had ruled by a mix of Legalism and Confucianism.)

== Physical appearance ==
The historical text Records of the Three Kingdoms describes Liu Bei as a man seven chi and five cun tall (approximately 1.74 metres), with long arms that "extended beyond his knees" and ears so large that "he himself could see them". (Note: (身長七尺五寸，垂手下膝，顧自見其耳。) Sanguozhi vol. 32.) According to the Chronicles of Huayang, Liu Bei had been called "Big Ears" (大耳) by both Lü Bu and Cao Cao. (Note: (布目先主曰：「大耳兒最叵信者也。」) Huayang Guo Zhi vol. 6.) (Note: (公曰：「大耳翁未之覺也。」) Huayang Guo Zhi vol. 6.) Furthermore, an anecdote shared with Zhang Yu mentions that Liu Bei in his fifties was noted to be beardless. (Note: 裕即荅曰：「昔有作上黨潞長，遷為涿令。涿令者，去官還家，時人與書，欲署潞則失涿，欲署涿則失潞，乃署曰『潞涿君』。」先主無鬚，故裕以此及之。) Sanguozhi vol. 42.)

== Family background ==
According to the third-century historical text Records of the Three Kingdoms, Liu Bei was born in Zhuo County, Zhuo Commandery (present-day Zhuozhou, Hebei). He was a descendant of Liu Sheng, who was the ninth son of Emperor Jing and the first King of Zhongshan in Han dynasty. However, Pei Songzhi's fifth-century commentary, based on the Dianlüe (典略), said that Liu Bei was a descendant of the Marquis of Linyi (臨邑侯). The title "Marquis of Linyi" was held by:

- Liu Fu (劉復; a great-nephew of Emperor Guangwu) and later by Liu Fu's son Liu Taotu (劉騊駼), who were descendants of Liu Fa (劉發), King Ding of Changsha – another son of Emperor Jing.
- Liu Rang (劉讓), a descendant of Liu Shun (劉舜), King Xian of Changshan, – yet another son of Emperor Jing.

Thus, it was possible that Liu Bei descended from either of those two patrilineal lines rather than Liu Sheng's line.

Liu Bei's grandfather Liu Xiong (劉雄) and father Liu Hong (劉弘) both served in provincial and commandery offices. Liu Bei's grandfather, Liu Xiong was recommended as a candidate for civil office in the xiaolian process. Then, he rose to become prefect of Fan (范) in Dong Commandery. (Note: (先主姓劉，諱備，字玄德，涿郡涿縣人，漢景帝子中山靖王勝之後也。勝子貞，元狩六年封涿縣陸城亭侯，坐酎金失侯，因家焉。) Sanguozhi vol. 32.) (Note: (《典略》曰：先主祖雄，父弘，世仕州郡。雄舉孝廉，官至東郡範令。) Dianlüe annotation in Sanguozhi vol. 32.)

== Early life (161–184) ==
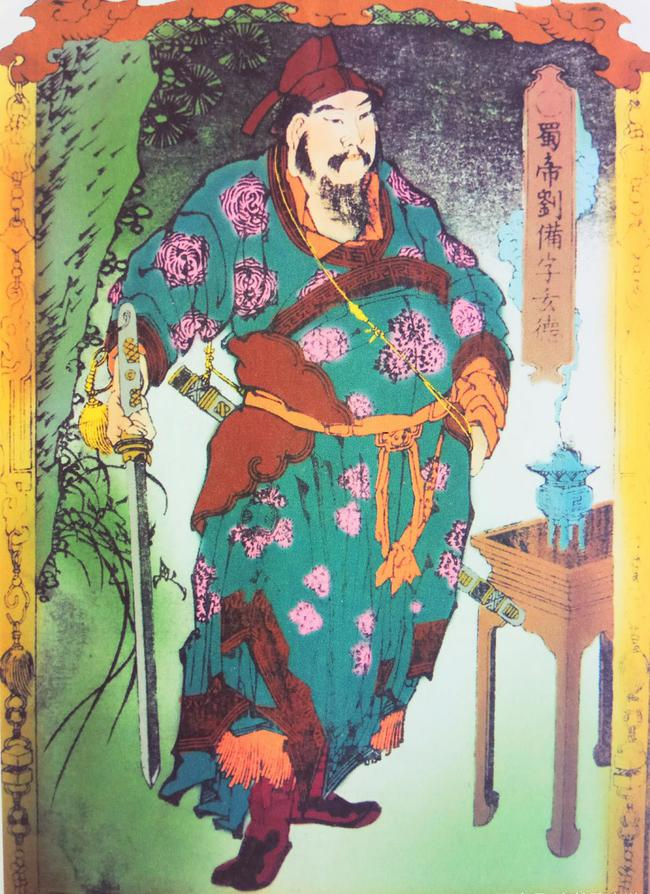
Edo period illustration of Liu Bei

Liu Bei's father, Liu Hong, didn't live long, so Liu Bei grew up poor. To support themselves, he and his mother sold shoes and woven straw mats. Despite this, Liu Bei was full of ambition from childhood. In the southeast of his house, there was a mulberry tree that was very tall (11.5 meters high). When looked from far away, the tree's shade was similar to a small cart therefore people from all around the village felt that this tree was unique with some saying that the house would produce a person of nobility. (Note: (先主少孤，與母販履織蓆為業。舍東南角籬上有桑樹生高五丈餘，遙望見童童如小車蓋，往來者皆怪此樹非凡，或謂當出貴人。) Sanguozhi vol. 32.) A fortune teller named Li Ding (李定) of Zhuo stated: "This family will certainly produce an estimable man." (Note: (漢晉春秋》曰：涿人李定雲：「此家必出貴人。」) Han Jin Chunqiu annotation in Sanguozhi vol. 32.) When he was a child, Liu Bei would play beneath the tree with other children from the village. He would often say: "I must ride in this feather covered chariot (emperor chariot)." Liu Bei's uncle Zijing (子敬) thought of Liu Bei's dream as foolish and that he would bring destruction to his house. (Note: (先主少時，與宗中諸小兒於樹下戲，言：「吾必當乘此羽葆蓋車。」叔父子敬謂曰：「汝勿妄語，滅吾門也！」) Sanguozhi vol. 32.)

In 175, when he was 14, his mother sent him to study with Lu Zhi, a distinguished man and former grand administrator of Jiujiang Commandery. Lu Zhi was from Zhuo Commandery, the same as Liu Bei. One of his fellow-students was Gongsun Zan of Liaodong, with whom he became friends. Since Gongsun Zan was older, Liu Bei treated him as an elder brother. Another fellow-student was his kinsman Liu Deran (劉德然). Liu Deran's father, Yuanqi (元起), often gave Liu Bei material support to help him and his mother and treated him the same as his son, Liu Deran. Yuanqi's wife wasn't happy about this and told him: “Each has his own family. How can you regularly do this?” Yuanqi answered: “This boy is in our clan, and he is an extraordinary person.” (Note: (年十五，母使行學，與同宗劉德然、遼西公孫瓚俱事故九江太守同郡盧植。德然父元起常資給先主，與德然等。元起妻曰：「各自一家，何能常爾邪！」起曰：「吾宗中有此兒，非常人也。」) Sanguozhi vol. 32.)

The adolescent Liu Bei was said to be unenthusiastic about studying. However he was fond of dogs and horses; he also displayed interest in hunting, music and dressing in fine clothing. He enjoyed associating with braves (haoxia), and in his youth he fought and hung out with them. He would not manifest his anger or happiness and always showed a pleasant face in front of others. Liu Bei was charismatic and all the heroic youth bonded with him. (Note: (而瓚深與先主相友。瓚年長，先主以兄事之。先主不甚樂讀書，喜狗馬、音樂、美衣服。身長七尺五寸，垂手下膝，顧自見其耳。少語言，善下人，喜怒不形於色。好交結豪俠，年少爭附之。) Sanguozhi vol. 32.) (Note: (善交結，豪俠少年爭附之。) Huayang Guo Zhi vol. 6.)

Around this time, two very wealthy great horse merchants from Zhongshan, Zhang Shiping (張世平) and Su Shuang (蘇雙), met Liu Bei while passing through Zhuo commandery selling horses. They were so struck by his appearance and personality that they gifted him much money and wealth, allowing Liu Bei to assemble a large group of followers. (Note: (中山大商張世平、蘇雙等貲累千金，販馬周旋於涿郡，見而異之，乃多與之金財。先主由是得用合徒眾。) Sanguozhi vol. 32.)

== Yellow Turban Rebellion (184–189) ==
In 184, at the end of the reign of Emperor Ling, the Yellow Turbans rose up and started the Yellow Turban Rebellion. Every province and commandery called for righteous men to defend the country. Liu Bei led his followers, including among them Guan Yu, Zhang Fei and Jian Yong, (Note: (靈帝末，黃巾起，州郡各舉義兵，) Sanguozhi vol. 32.) to join the local government forces led by Colonel Zou Jing, participating in battles against the rebels with distinction. (Note: (先主率其屬從校尉鄒靖討黃巾賊有功，除安喜尉。) Sanguozhi vol. 32.) Around this time, Liu Ziping of Pingyuan heard of Liu Bei's reputation as a brave man. When Zhang Chun (張純) rebelled, the Qing Province was ordered by imperial decree to send an attendant official to lead an army to defeat Zhang Chun. As they passed through Pingyuan, Ziping recommended Liu Bei to the attendant official. Liu Bei accepted and joined him. When they met the rebels in the field, Liu Bei was gravely wounded and had to feign being dead. After the rebels left, Bei's friend loaded him onto a cart, carrying him away to safety. In recognition of his contributions, the Han central government appointed Liu Bei as the Commandant (尉) of Anxi County (安喜縣; northwest of present-day Anguo, Hebei), one of the counties in Zhongshan Commandery (中山郡). (Note: (典略曰：平原劉子平知備有武勇，時張純反叛，青州被詔，遣從事將兵討純，過平原，子平薦備於從事，遂與相隨，遇賊於野，備中創陽死，賊去後，故人以車載之，得免。後以軍功，為中山安喜尉。) Dianlüe annotation in Sanguozhi vol. 32.)

Later, the Han central government decreed that any official who had gained a post as a reward for military contributions was to be dismissed, yet Liu Bei doubted that he would be dismissed. When he saw an inspector sent to his prefecture, he wanted to meet him. The inspector, however, refused to see him, claiming illness. Liu Bei was furious; he returned to his office, led clerks and soldiers to the postal relay station, and forced his way through the door, proclaiming: "I have been secretly instructed by the commandery administrator to arrest the inspector!" Thereupon he bound the inspector, took him to the outskirts of the district, and tied him to a tree. Liu Bei undid his ribbon of office and hung it on the inspector's neck, whereupon he had the inspector lashed more than one hundred times with a bamboo stave. Liu Bei wanted to kill the inspector, but was dissuaded by the latter's pleas for mercy. Afterwards, he vacated his office. (Note: (督郵以公事到縣，先主求謁，不通，直入縛督郵，杖二百，解綬繫其頸着馬枊，棄官亡命。) Sanguozhi vol. 32.) (Note: (典略曰：其後州郡被詔書，其有軍功為長吏者，當沙汰之，備疑在遣中。督郵至縣，當遣備，備素知之。聞督郵在傳舍，備欲求見督郵，督郵稱疾不肯見備，備恨之，因還治，將吏卒更詣傳舍，突入門，言「我被府君密教收督郵」 。遂就床縛之，將出到界，自解其綬以繫督郵頸，縛之著樹，鞭杖百餘下，欲殺之。督郵求哀，乃釋去之。) Dianlüe annotation in Sanguozhi vol. 32.)

He then travelled south with his followers to join another militia. Around this time, the General-in-Chief He Jin sent the Chief Commandant Guanqiu Yi (毌丘毅) to Danyang with the mission to recruit soldiers and Liu Bei joined him in fighting the Yellow Turbans remnants in Xu Province. When they reached Xiapi, they met the rebel army and Liu Bei fought hard with talent. As a reward for his contributions, he was appointed as Assistant (下密丞) in the commandery office. Again, he resigned from his post. (Note: (頃之，大將軍何進遣都尉毌丘毅詣丹楊募兵，先主與俱行，至下邳遇賊，力戰有功，除為下密丞。復去官。) Sanguozhi vol. 32.) According to the Records of Heroes written by Wang Can, Liu Bei then visited the imperial capital where he met Cao Cao. He joined him as they returned to Cao Cao's ancestral home in Pei State, which is present-day Bozhou, Anhui. where they recruited and gathered many people. (Note: (《英雄記》云：靈帝末年，備嘗在京師，後與曹公俱還沛國，募召合眾。) Yingxiong Ji annotation in Sanguozhi vol. 32.)

Thereafter, the Han central government appointed Liu Bei as the Commandant (都尉) of Gaotang County before promoting him to Prefect (令). (Note: (後為高唐尉，遷為令。) Sanguozhi vol. 32.)

== Warlord state ==
=== In Gongsun Zan's service (189–194) ===
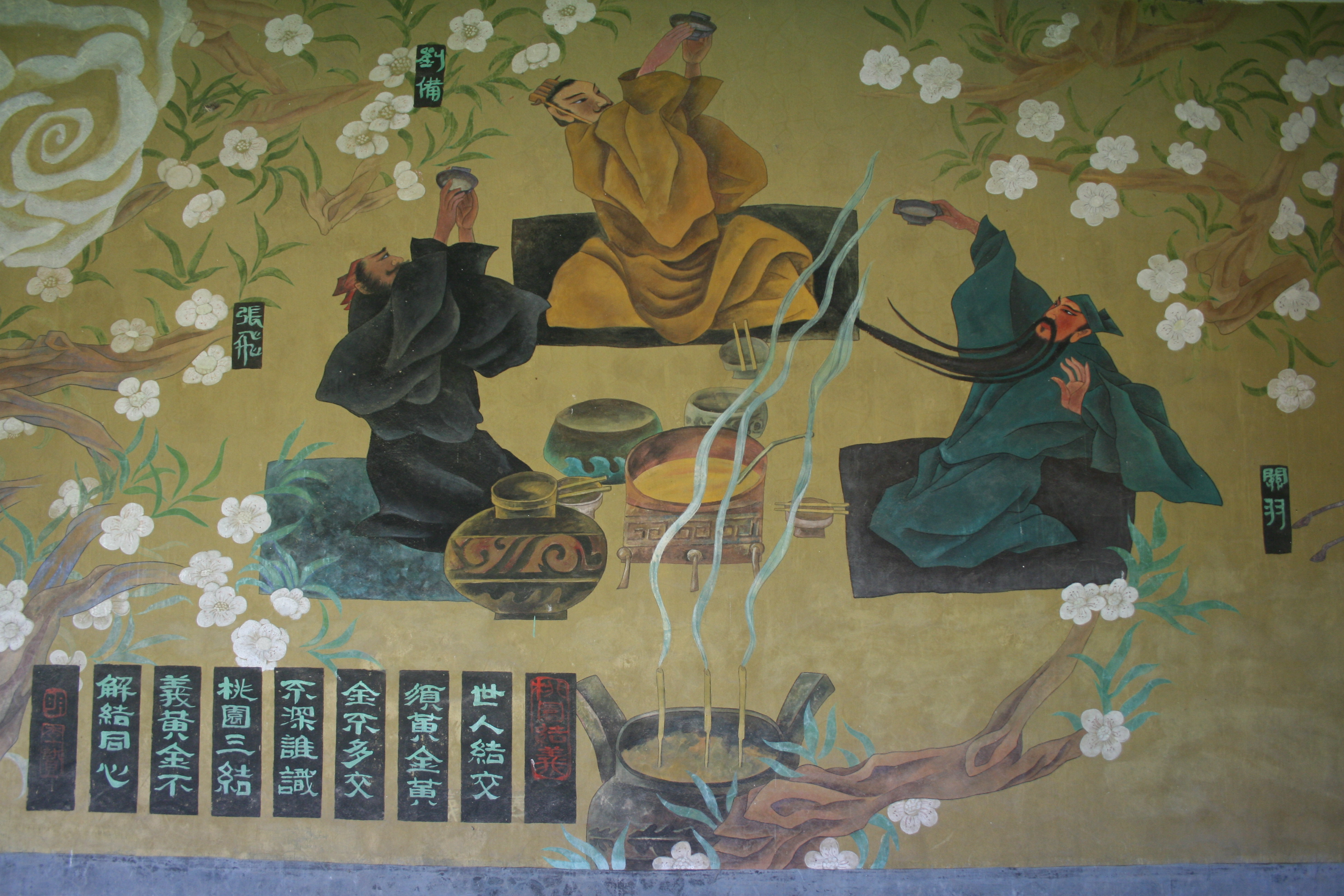
Baling Qiao, mural illustration of the Oath of the Peach Garden between Guan Yu, Zhang Fei, & Liu Bei

When Emperor Ling died in 189, the land fell into chaos. Therefore, Liu Bei raised an army and joined the Campaign against Dong Zhuo. (Note: (《英雄記》云：會靈帝崩，天下大亂，備亦起軍從討董卓。) Yingxiong Ji annotation in Sanguozhi vol. 32.) Later, when he returned to Gaotang County, the commandery was overwhelmed by rebels, so he opted to move north to join an old friend, the warlord Gongsun Zan. In 191, they scored a major victory against another warlord Yuan Shao (the leader of the former alliance against Dong Zhuo) in their struggle for control of Ji Province and Qing Province. Gongsun Zan nominated Liu Bei to be the Chancellor (相) of Pingyuan State and sent him to join his subordinate Tian Kai in fighting Yuan Shao's eldest son Yuan Tan in Qing Province. (Note: Pingyuan State lay on the border between Yuan Shao and Gongsun Zan's territories, and was the only commandery/state Yuan Tan controlled before his expansion. Tian Kai assumed the appointment of Inspector of Qing Province under Yuan Shao, and acted as Liu Bei's direct supervisor.) In defending against the governor of Ji province, Yuan Shao, he fought many battles with distinction. Therefore, he was appointed probationary Prefect (令) of Pingyuan and later was made the concurrent Chancellor (相). (Note: (為賊所破，往奔中郎將公孫瓚，瓚表為別部司馬，使與青州刺史田楷以拒冀州牧袁紹。數有戰功，試守平原令，後領平原相。) Sanguozhi vol. 32.)

While he was in Pingyuan, a resident named Liu Ping (劉平), who had long held Liu Bei in low esteem and who was ashamed of having to serve under him, hired an assassin to kill Liu Bei. Liu Bei, however, didn't realize the assassin's intention, treating him so generously that the assassin could not bring himself to kill him. The assassin informed Liu Bei about Liu Ping's plot before he left. Such was the extent to which Liu Bei had won the hearts of the people. (Note: (郡民劉平素輕先主，恥為之下，使客刺之。客不忍刺，語之而去。其得人心如此。) Sanguozhi vol. 32.) Pingyuan was poor and its people starving, so some banded together to commit robbery. Liu Bei guarded against such bandits while carrying out generous economic measures. He had elites and commoners sit on the same mat and eat from the same pot. He felt no cause to be disdainful, so people attached themselves to him in droves. (Note: (《魏書》曰：劉平結客刺備，備不知而待客甚厚，客以狀語之而去。是時人民饑饉，屯聚鈔暴。備外禦寇難，內豐財施，士之下者，必與同席而坐，同簋而食，無所簡擇。眾多歸焉。) Wei Shu annotation in Sanguozhi vol. 32.)

During his tenure at Pingyuan, Kong Rong worked as the Chancellor of Beihai State (北海國) and was besieged by an army led by Yellow Turbans. He sent Taishi Ci to ask for reinforcement from Liu Bei. When he learned of this, Liu Bei said: "So, Kong Wenju knows that there is a Liu Bei in this world?" Thereafter, he sent troops to rescue Kong Rong and the siege was lifted. (Note: (北海相魯國孔融，為黃巾賊所圍，使太史慈求救於先主。先主曰：「孔文舉聞天下有劉備乎？」以兵救之。) Huayang Guo Zhi vol. 6.)

=== Succeeding Tao Qian (194) ===
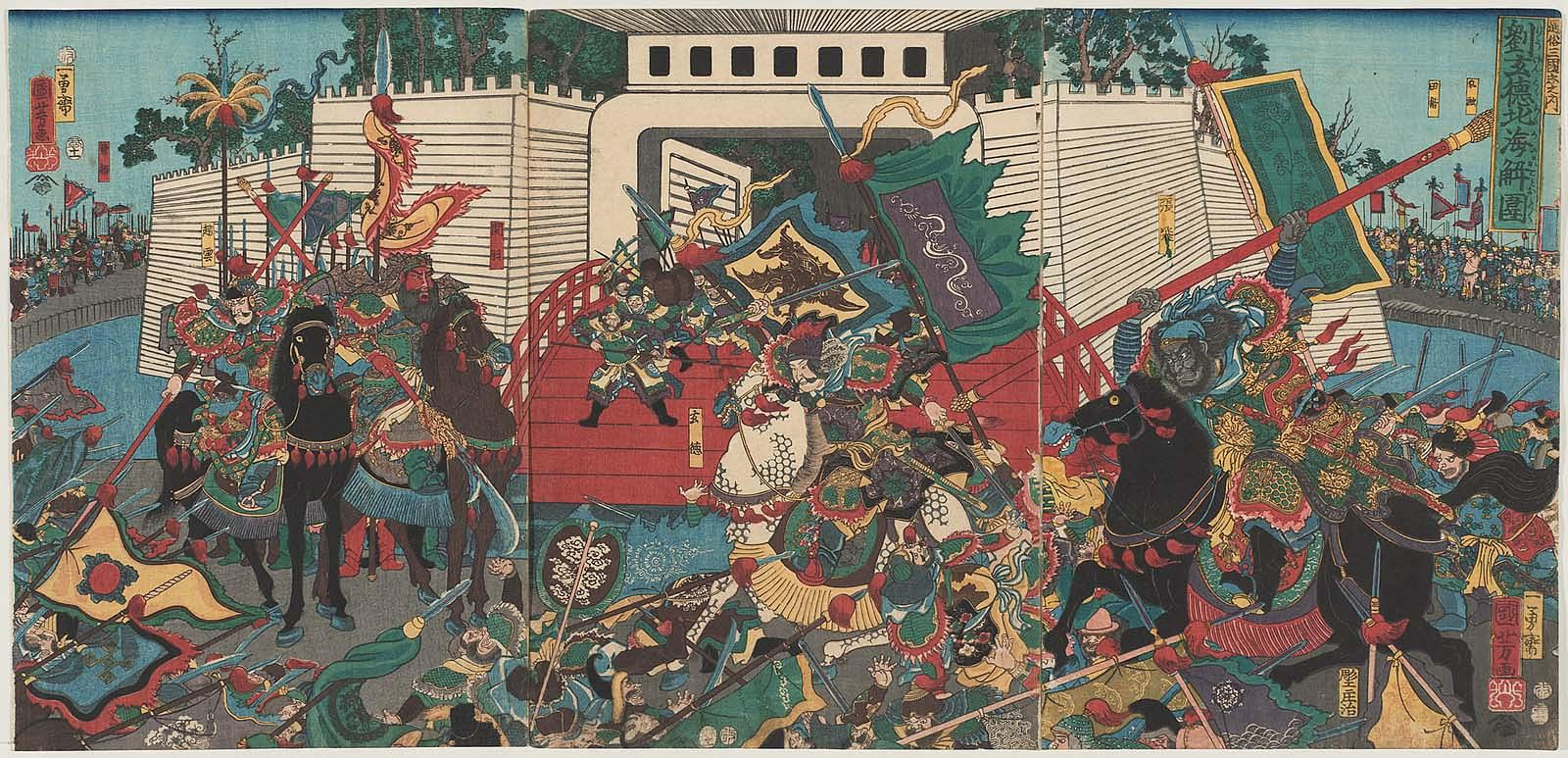
Edo period illustration of Liu Bei breaking the Siege of Beihai along with Taishi Ci, Guan Yu and Zhang Fei

At this time, an alliance of Yuan Shu, Tao Qian and Gongsun Zan opposed an alliance of Yuan Shao, Cao Cao and Liu Biao. In 194, Cao Cao attacked Tao Qian, the Governor of Xu Province. In face of strong pressure from Cao Cao, Tao Qian appealed to Tian Kai for help. Tian Kai and Liu Bei led their armies to support Tao Qian. Liu Bei himself led over 5,000 soldiers with mixed barbarian cavalry from the Wuhuan of You province. He also conscripted several thousand commoners. (Note: (袁紹攻公孫瓚，先主與田楷東屯齊。曹公征徐州，徐州牧陶謙遣使告急於田楷，楷與先主俱救之。時先主自有兵千餘人及幽州烏丸雜胡騎，又略得饑民數千人。) Sanguozhi vol. 32.)

Despite initial success in the invasion, Cao Cao's subordinate Zhang Miao rebelled and allowed Lü Bu to take over Cao Cao's base in Yan Province, forcing Cao Cao to retreat from Xu Province. Tao Qian asked Liu Bei to station his army in nearby Xiaopei and gave him 4,000 more troops from Danyang in addition to the troops and Wuhuan cavalry already under his command. Thus, Liu Bei broke with his superior Tian Kai for Tao Qian, who then memorialized the court to have Liu Bei appointed as the Inspector of Yu province. Liu Bei led his army to Xiaopei, then proceeded to raise troops around the area, and actively built-up connections with influential clans and people of the region. In a rather short period of time, he had gained the support of the two most powerful families in Xu Province: the Mi family led by Mi Zhu and Mi Fang and the Chen family led by Chen Gui and Chen Deng. (Note: (既到，謙以丹楊兵四千益先主，先主遂去楷歸謙。謙表先主為豫州刺史，屯小沛。) Sanguozhi vol. 32.)

The previously mentioned Chen Deng was a man of great talent and enjoyed giving appraisal of well known people. He once said to the scholar Chen Jiao (陳矯) (Note: Chen Jiao has a biography in vol.22 of Sanguozhi.) about Liu Bei: "When It comes to those of bold character that are destined to be heroes, those who lay great plan to become hegemon-kings, I respect Liu Bei." Then he grouped him along with Chen Ji, Hua Xin and Kong Rong as outstanding individuals. (Note: (廣陵太守下邳陳登元龍，太尉球孫也，有雋才，輕天下士，謂功曹陳矯曰：...；雄姿傑出，有王霸之略，吾敬劉玄德。名器盡此。」) Huayang Guo Zhi vol. 6.)

Soon Tao Qian's illness became serious and he told the Bieja (別駕; important assistant to the governor of the province) Mi Zhu: "Other than Liu Bei, there is no one who can bring peace to this province." Upon Tao Qian's death in 194, the Mi family backed Liu Bei instead of one of Tao Qian's sons to be the new Governor of Xu Province. Mi Zhu then led the residents of the province to meet Liu Bei however he was still hesitant and apprehensive about taking this post. He then consulted Kong Rong and Chen Deng. (Note: (謙病篤，謂別駕麋竺曰：「非劉備不能安此州也。」謙死，竺率州人迎先主，先主未敢當。) Sanguozhi vol. 32.)

Chen Deng told him: "Today the House of Han is in decline and the empire is in chaos. It is the moment to establish merit and to accomplish affairs. This province is rich with a population of one million. We wish to impose on you the post of the inspector and have you assume charge of the affairs of the province." Liu Bei answered: "Yuan Shu is nearby at Shouchun. That man is from a line of four dukes in five generations. The empire is turning to him. You can give the province to him.” Chen Deng then said: "Gonglu (Note: Yuan Shu's courtesy name) is arrogant. He is not the ruler to bring order out of the chaos. Now, I wish to assemble 100 000 infantry and cavalry for my lord. Above, you can assist our sovereign and bring aid to the common people then you could fulfill the calling of the Five Hegemons. Below you could allocate territory and preserve the boundaries. Finally, you could write your achievements on bamboo and silk to be recorded for the posterity. If the inspector does not assent then I also dare not to obey the inspector." (Note: (下邳陳登謂先主曰：「今漢室陵遲，海內傾覆，立功立事，在於今日。彼州殷富，戶口百萬，欲屈使君撫臨州事。」先主曰：「袁公路近在壽春，此君四世五公，海內所歸，君可以州與之。」登曰：「公路驕豪，非治亂之主。今欲為使君合步騎十萬，上可以匡主濟民，成五霸之業，下可以割地守境，書功於竹帛。若使君不見聽許，登亦未敢聽使君也。」) Sanguozhi vol. 32.)

The chancellor of Beihai, Kong Rong also told him: "Is Yuan Gonglu someone who will be concerned about the state and forget his family? In what way are dried bones in the grave worthy of our attention? As far as today's matter is concerned, the people will adhere to men of talent and ability. If one does not accept what heaven offers to him then it will be too late if you regret, it later.” Both of them advised him to form an alliance with Yuan Shao. (Note: (北海相孔融謂先主曰：「袁公路豈憂國忘家者邪？冢中枯骨，何足介意。今日之事，百姓與能，天與不取，悔不可追。」先主遂領徐州。) Sanguozhi vol. 32.)

At that time, Chen Deng with Mi Zhu along with the others sent a messenger to call on to Yuan Shao saying: "Heaven has sent down disastrous stench and misfortune has fallen upon our humble and small region. Recently, Tao Qian has died and the people are without a ruler. They fear that greedy rapace will one day take advantage of the opening to extend themselves therefore are very anxious. However, they will embrace the former Administrator of Pingyuan Liu Bei as their rightful leader. Hence allowing the people to know that they have someone to rely on. Just now rebel are around all the regions; there's not a moment of peace to remove his armor. Hence we respectfully send lower officials to report this to the officials in charge." Yuan Shao answered: "Liu Xuande is liberal and refined. He is also known as a man of trust and righteousness. Now, (the people of) Xu region happily accepts him; this matches my own desires." Liu Bei finally took over Xu Province after Yuan Shao recognised the legitimacy of his governorship. (Note: (獻帝春秋曰：陳登等遣使詣袁紹曰：「天降災沴，禍臻鄙州，州將殂殞，生民無主，恐懼奸雄一旦承隙，以貽盟主日昃之憂，輒共奉故平原相劉備府君以為宗主，永使百姓知有依歸。方今寇難縱橫，不遑釋甲，謹遣下吏奔告於執事。」紹答曰：「劉玄德弘雅有信義，今徐州樂戴之，誠副所望也。」) Xiandi Chunqiu annotation in Sanguozhi vol. 32.)

=== Conflict with Lü Bu (195–198) ===
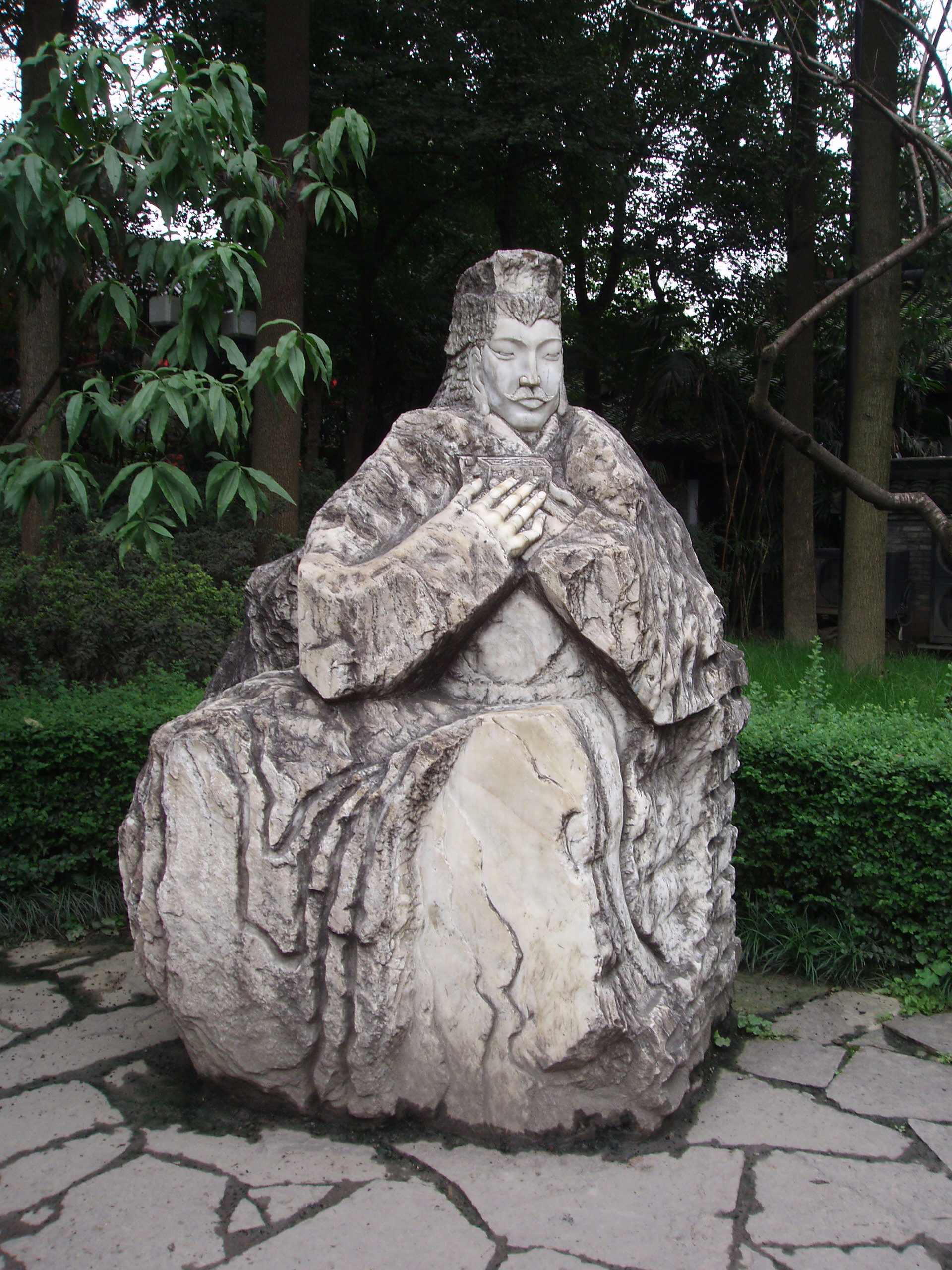
Statue of Liu Bei in Wuhou Shrine, Chengdu

In 195, Lü Bu was defeated by Cao Cao and sought shelter under Liu Bei. In the next year, Yuan Shu led an army to invade Xu Province. In response, Liu Bei led his troops to counter Yuan Shu's advances near present-day Xuyi County and stopped him at Xuyi and Huaiyin (淮陰). Around this time, Cao Cao memorialized to appoint Liu Bei as General Who Subdues The East (鎮東將軍) and enfeoffed him as marquis of Yicheng Village (宜城亭侯). This was in the first year of the Jian'an period (196). (Note: (袁術來攻先主，先主拒之於盱眙、淮陰。曹公表先主為鎮東將軍，封宜城亭侯，是歲建安元年也。) Sanguozhi vol. 32.)

Liu Bei and Yuan Shu had a standoff for about a month without any decisive result. In the meantime, Zhang Fei whom Liu Bei left in charge of Xiapi Commandery (下邳郡; around present-day Pizhou, Jiangsu), the capital of Xu Province, murdered Cao Bao, the Chancellor of Xiapi after an intense quarrel. Cao Bao's death stirred up unrest in Xiapi Commandery which provided the warlord Lü Bu an opportunity to link up with defectors from Liu Bei's side to seize control of Xiapi Commandery and capture Liu Bei's family. (Note: (先主與術相持經月，呂布乘虛襲下邳。下邳守將曹豹反，閒迎布。布虜先主妻子，先主轉軍海西。) Sanguozhi vol. 32.)

Upon receiving news of Lü Bu's intrusion, Liu Bei immediately headed back to Xiapi Commandery but most of his troops scattered along the way. With his remaining men, Liu Bei moved eastward to take Guangling Commandery where Yuan Shu's forces defeated him. Liu Bei then retreated to Haixi County (海西縣; southeast of present-day Guannan County, Jiangsu). (Note: (布取下邳，張飛敗走。備聞之，引兵還，比至下邳，兵潰。收散卒東取廣陵，與袁術戰，又敗。) Yingxiong Ji annotation in Sanguozhi vol. 32.)

However, surrounded by hostile forces and facing a lack of food supplies. Liu Bei's army, both soldiers and military officers resorted to cannibalism. Pressed by poverty and hunger, Liu Bei's men wanted to return to Xiapi. Liu Bei eventually had no choice but to send an official request to surrender to Lü Bu who accepted his surrender and ordered Liu Bei to return to the seat of Xu and to combine their strength to defeat Yuan Shu. He then prepared the regional inspector's chariot and returned his family to the bank of the Si River as an act of good faith. Before Liu Bei left, there was a farewell banquet and everyone seemed happy. (Note: (英雄記曰：備軍在廣陵，飢餓困踧，吏士大小自相噉食，窮餓侵逼，欲還小沛，遂使吏請降布。布令備還州，並勢擊術。具刺史車馬僮僕，發遣備妻子部曲家屬於泗水上，祖道相樂。) Yingxiong Ji annotation in Sanguozhi vol. 32.)

Lü Bu, fearing that Yuan Shu would turn on him after eliminating Liu Bei, obstructed Yuan Shu's attempts to destroy Liu Bei. At this time, Lü Bu's commanders said to him: "Liu Bei has changed his allegiance too often. It is difficult to know what he is going to do and develop relations with him. Soon, you will have to think of a way to take care of him." However, Lü Bu didn't listen to them and even related the matter to Liu Bei. Liu Bei was alarmed and maneuvered to distance himself sending a messenger to Lü Bu with a request to be relocated to Xiaopei. Lü Bu agreed, and Liu Bei was able to safely arrive at Xiaopei where he immediately raised 10 000 troops. (Note: (魏書曰：諸將謂布曰：「備數反覆難養，宜早圖之。」布不聽，以狀語備。備心不安而求自託，使人說布，求屯小沛，布乃遣之。 復合兵得萬餘人。) Wei Shu annotation in Sanguozhi vol. 32.)

Upon seeing Liu Bei's growing power, Lü Bu became worried that Liu Bei would turn against him so he launched a preemptive attack on Xiaopei. Liu Bei was defeated and fled to the imperial capital, Xuchang, (Note: Xu Province (徐州) and Xuchang (許昌) have similar Romanisations in Pinyin but they refer to separate places.) where he took shelter under Cao Cao, the warlord who had been controlling the Han central government since he had brought the figurehead Emperor Xian of Han to Xuchang in 196. Cao Cao welcomed Liu Bei warmly, used Emperor Xian's name to appoint him as the Governor of Yu Province and put him in command of some troops. Liu Bei then returned to the Eastern front to keep an eye on Lü Bu. (Note: (自出兵攻先主，先主敗走歸曹公。曹公厚遇之，以為豫州牧。將至沛收散卒，給其軍糧，益與兵使東擊布。) Sanguozhi vol. 32.)

During the year 197, Yang Feng and Han Xian were brigands who raided the area between Yang and Xu provinces and were ordered by Lü Bu to lead their troops to raid Liu Bei's supplies. However, Liu Bei successfully lured them into a trap. Yang Feng was killed while Han Xian managed to escape.

In 198, Lü Bu renewed his alliance with Yuan Shu to counter Cao Cao's growing influence. Lü Bu ordered his soldiers to gather gold and money to buy some military horses however along the way Liu Bei led his troops and managed to capture the gold and money. In response, Lü Bu sent Gao Shun and Zhang Liao to attack Liu Bei at Peicheng. Cao Cao sent Xiahou Dun to support Liu Bei but he was unable to rescue Liu Bei and they were defeated by Gao Shun again he had his family captured by Gao Shun who sent them to Lü Bu. Liu Bei fled to Xuchang to take shelter under Cao Cao who brought Liu Bei along as he personally led an army to attack Lü Bu in Xu Province. Later that year, the combined forces of Cao Cao and Liu Bei defeated Lü Bu at the Battle of Xiapi; Lü Bu was captured and executed after his defeat. (Note: (呂布惡之，自出兵攻先主，先主敗走歸曹公。曹公厚遇之，以為豫州牧。將至沛收散卒，給其軍糧，益與兵使東擊布。布遣高順攻之，曹公遣夏侯惇往，不能救，為順所敗，復虜先主妻子送布。曹公自出東征，) Sanguozhi vol. 32.) (Note: (英雄記曰：建安三年春，布使人齎金欲詣河內買馬，為備兵所鈔。布由是遣中郎將高順、北地太守張遼等攻備。九月，遂破沛城，備單身走，獲其妻息。十月，曹公自征布，備於梁國界中與曹公相遇，遂隨公俱東征。) Yingxiong Ji annotation in Sanguozhi vol. 32.)

Before his execution, Lü Bu tried to convince Cao Cao to let him live. He told him: "Let me serve under you and you would be unopposed in the realm." Cao Cao still had some doubts. Then, Liu Bei said: "Will you have Lü Bu treat you the same way as he treated the General Ding Yuan and the Grand Instructor Dong Zhuo?" At this remark, Cao Cao nodded while Lü Bu was glaring at Liu Bei and told him: "Big Ears (大耳), you are the most untrustworthy of all." (Note: (三年，公自征布，生禽之。布曰：「使布為明公將騎，天下不足定也。」公有疑色。先主曰：「公待布能如丁建陽、董太師乎？」公頷之。布目先主曰：「大耳兒最叵信者也。」遂殺布。) Huayang Guo Zhi vol. 6.)

Liu Bei recovered his wife and children and followed Cao Cao back to Xu. Cao Cao sent a memorial to have Liu Bei promoted as General Of The Left. Cao Cao treated him with great sympathy. When they went out, they would ride in the same chariot and when they sat, it was on the same mat. (Note: (助先主圍布於下邳，生禽布。先主復得妻子，從曹公還許。表先主為左將軍，禮之愈重，出則同輿，坐則同席。) Yingxiong Ji annotation in Sanguozhi vol. 32.) Cao Cao's advisors Cheng Yu and Guo Jia urged Cao Cao to have Liu Bei killed however Cao Cao refused to follow their advice because he feared that in doing so he would lose the respect of the heroes and scholars in the realm. (Note: (公謀臣程昱、郭嘉勸公殺先主。公慮失英豪望，不許。) Huayang Guo Zhi vol. 6.)

=== Role in the Cao–Yuan conflict (199–201) ===
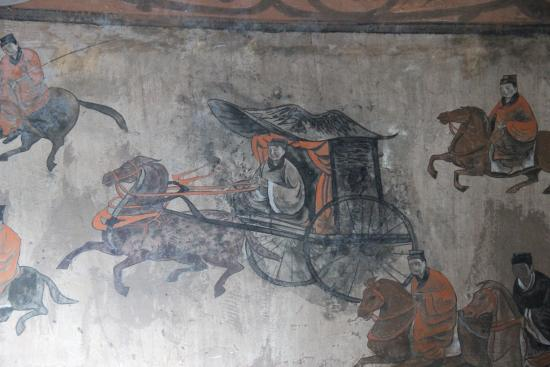
A mural showing chariots and cavalry, from the Dahuting Tomb of the late Eastern Han dynasty (25-220 CE), located in Zhengzhou, Henan

By 199, Cao Cao enjoyed a strong political advantage over his rivals because he had Emperor Xian and the Han central government firmly under his control. During this time, Liu Bei participated in a conspiracy with Dong Cheng, Colonel of the Chang River Encampment Zhong Ji (種輯), General Wu Zilan (吳子蘭) and General Wang Zifu (王子服) to assassinate Cao Cao, after Dong Cheng had received a secret edict from within the Emperor Xian's clothing and girdle to kill Cao Cao. Around this time, Cao Cao said brusquely to Liu Bei: "Currently among the heroes of the empire, there is only you and I. The ilk of Benchu (Note: Yuan Shao's courtesy name) are not worth counting.” At this moment, Liu Bei was taking a bite and from the shock dropped his chopstick and spoon. He excused himself on account of a clap of thunder and told Cao Cao: "When the wise said, “If there is a sudden clap of thunder and a fierce wind, I must change my countenance” it was truly with reason. The awesomeness of a single clap can cause this!" (Note: (先主未出時，獻帝舅車騎將軍董承辭受帝衣帶中密詔，當誅曹公。先主未發。是時曹公從容謂先主曰：「今天下英雄，唯使君與操耳。本初之徒，不足數也。」先主方食，失匕箸。) Sanguozhi vol. 32.) (Note: (《華陽國志》云：於時正當雷震，備因謂操曰：「聖人云『迅雷風烈必變』，良有以也。一震之威，乃可至於此也！」遂與承及長水校尉種輯、將軍吳子蘭、王子服等同謀。會見使，未發。事覺，承等皆伏誅。 《獻帝起居注》曰：承等與備謀未發，而備出。承謂服曰：「郭多有數百兵，壞李傕數萬人，但足下與我同不耳！昔呂不韋之門，須子楚而後高，今吾與子由是也。」服曰：「惶懼不敢當，且兵又少。」承曰：「舉事訖，得曹公成兵，顧不足邪？」服曰：「今京師豈有所任乎？」承曰：「長水校尉種輯、議郎吳碩是我腹心辦事者。」遂定計。) Huayang Guo Zhi annotation in Sanguozhi vol. 32.)

However, at the same time, Liu Bei was anxious to leave Xuchang and be free of Cao Cao's control. Thus, upon hearing news that Yuan Shu was on his way to join Yuan Shao after his defeat, Liu Bei requested permission from Cao Cao to lead an army to stop Yuan Shu. Cao Cao agreed and sent Liu Bei and Zhu Ling to lead an army to block Yuan Shu, who couldn't pass through them and was forced to retreat back to his base in Shouchun and died there later that year. While Zhu Ling returned to Xu, Liu Bei remained in command of the army and led them to attack and seize control of Xu Province after murdering Che Zhou (車冑), the provincial governor appointed by Cao Cao. Liu Bei then moved to Xiaopei while leaving Guan Yu in charge of Xu Province's capital, Xiapi. (Note: (袁術欲經徐州北就袁紹，曹公遣先主督朱靈、路招要擊術。未至，術病死。先主據下邳。靈等還，先主乃殺徐州刺史車冑，留關羽守下邳，而身還小沛。) Sanguozhi vol. 32.)

According to the Wu Li (吳歷) written by Hu Chong, Cao Cao sent loyal men acting as spy to his commanders during entertainments then on some pretext have them killed. Liu Bei often close his gates and concentrate his time to gardening. While Cao Cao would send someone to keep an eye on him. After the spy left, Liu Bei told Guan Yu and Zhang Fei: "How could I become a gardener? Cao Cao is really suspicious. We cannot stay with him." At night, he opened the rear gate and along with his followers left on light horseback. All the clothing he previously received was sealed and left behind. Then he headed for Xiaopei to raise his army. (Note: (胡沖《吳歷》曰：曹公數遣親近密覘諸將有賓客酒食者，輒因事害之。備時閉門，將人種蕪菁，曹公使人闚門。既去，備謂張飛、關羽曰：「吾豈種菜者乎？曹公必有疑意，不可復留。」其夜開後柵，與飛等輕騎俱去，所得賜遺衣服，悉封留之，乃往小沛收合兵眾。) Wu Li annotation in Sanguozhi vol. 32.)

On this anecdote, Pei Songzhi commented: "Cao Cao had Liu Bei lead an army to attack Yuan Shu, Guo Jia along with others were against his decision however he refused to listen to them. The matter should be clear. Liu Bei didn't escape because he was growing vegetables. All of this is absurd!" (Note: (臣松之案：魏武帝遣先主統諸將要擊袁術，郭嘉等並諫，魏武不從，其事顯然，非因種菜遁逃而去。如胡沖所云，何乖僻之甚乎！) Pei Songzhi annotation in Sanguozhi vol. 32.) However the Chronicles of Huayang also gave a similar account with other information such as Guo Jia and Cheng Yu warning Cao Cao that Liu Bei had left, and Cao Cao sending riders to stop him but they failed to do so. It also stated that when he learned about Liu Bei doing trivial things, Cao Cao said: "Old Big Ears (大耳) is really oblivious to what is happening." (Note: (先主還「沛」解，公使覘之，見其方披，使廝人為之，不端，正舉杖擊之。此覘者還報語。公曰：「大耳翁未之覺也。」其夜，先主急東行。昱、嘉復言之。公馳使追之，不及。) Huayang Guo Zhi vol. 6.)

Chang Ba (昌霸) (Note: In his annotation to Zizhi Tongjian, Hu Sanxing wrote that Chang Ba and Chang Xi were the same person.) of Donghai used this occasion to rebel. Also, many commanderies and prefectures joined Liu Bei in rebellion against Cao Cao. Soon, their numbers totaled more than ten thousand. In the meantime, Yuan Shao had defeated Gongsun Zan and was preparing to attack Cao Cao in the Henan region. Liu Bei then sent his adviser Sun Qian to meet Yuan Shao and request that he launch an immediate attack on Cao Cao but Yuan Shao refused. In 200, Cao Cao discovered Dong Cheng's conspiracy and had all the participants rounded up and executed along with their families. Liu Bei survived the purge because he was not in Xuchang. (Note: (東海昌霸反，郡縣多叛曹公為先主，眾數萬人，遣孫乾與袁紹連和，...) Sanguozhi vol. 32.) (Note: Liu Bei killing Che Zhou before Dong Cheng was purged is per Cao Cao's biography in Sanguozhi. Liu Bei's biography recorded that Che Zhou was killed by Liu after Dong Cheng was purged. In his Zizhi Tongjian Kaoyi, Sima Guang noted that Yuan Hong's Annals of the Later Han recorded that Liu Bei occupied Xiapi before Dong Cheng's death. Thus, Sima concluded that the record in Liu Bei's biography was erroneous.)

Having achieved stability in Xuchang, Cao Cao turned his attention towards preparing for a battle with Yuan Shao. He fortified many key crossing points along the south banks of the Yellow River and set up a main camp at Guandu. At the same time, he sent his subordinates Liu Dai (劉岱) (Note: This Liu Dai was not the same person as Liu Dai, brother of Liu Yao, who was an Inspector of Yan Province who died in 192.) and Wang Zhong to attack Liu Bei in Xu Province but they were defeated. Cao Cao then made a highly risky move: He predicted that Yuan Shao would not make any advances so he secretly left his defensive position along the Yellow River and personally led an army to Xu Province to attack Liu Bei. Under the weight of Cao Cao's attacks, Liu Bei's forces quickly disintegrated and Xu Province fell to Cao Cao. Guan Yu, isolated in Xiapi Commandery, was captured by Cao Cao's forces and decided to surrender and temporarily serve under Cao Cao. Liu Bei headed north to join Yuan Shao. (Note: (曹公遣劉岱、王忠擊之，不克。五年，曹公東征先主，先主敗績。) Sanguozhi vol. 32.) (Note: (《魏書》曰：是時，公方有急於官渡，乃分留諸將屯官渡，自勒精兵征備。備初謂公與大敵連，不得東，而候騎卒至，言曹公自來。備大驚，然猶未信。自將數十騎出望公軍，見麾旌，便棄眾而走。曹公盡收其眾，虜先主妻子，並禽關羽以歸。) Wei Shu annotation in Sanguozhi vol. 32.)

Liu Bei first went to Qing province which was under Yuan Tan's supervision. Liu Bei had formerly recommended Yuan Tan as a maocai (茂才), therefore they had good relations. Yuan Tan himself led infantry and cavalry to welcome him. Both of them then left for Pingyuan. Yuan Tan sent a messenger to report to his father, who sent a commander to greet Liu Bei and personally went 200 li from Ye to welcome him. Both Yuan Shao and Yuan Tan greatly esteemed Liu Bei. He stayed a month and a few days; soon his soldiers regrouped under him. He participated in the Battle of Yan Ford alongside Yuan Shao's general Wen Chou against Cao Cao's forces, but they suffered a defeat and Wen Chou was killed in battle. (Note: (先主走青州。青州刺史袁譚，先主故茂才也，將步騎迎先主。先主隨譚到平原，譚馳使白紹。紹遣將道路奉迎，身去鄴二百里，與先主相見。) Sanguozhi vol. 32.) (Note: (魏書曰：備歸紹，紹父子傾心敬重。 駐月餘日，所失亡士卒稍稍來集。) Wei Shu annotation in Sanguozhi vol. 32.)

As Liu Pi, a former Yellow Turban rebel, started a revolt in Runan Commandery (southeastern Henan), Liu Bei convinced Yuan Shao to provide him troops to assist Liu Pi. At the same time, Guan Yu rejoined Liu Bei. When Liu Bei arrived, many among the commandery joined and supported him. Along with Liu Pi then led their forces from Runan Commandery to attack Xuchang while Cao Cao was away at Guandu; however Cao Ren foresaw that most of them were new recruits or Yuan Shao's soldiers not yet ready to follow Liu Bei's orders, therefore he quickly assembled his cavalry and defeated them. (Note: (紹遣劉備徇㶏彊諸縣，多舉衆應之。自許以南，吏民不安，太祖以為憂。仁曰：「南方以大軍方有目前急，其勢不能相救，劉備以彊兵臨之，其背叛固宜也。備新將紹兵，未能得其用，擊之可破也。」太祖善其言，遂使將騎擊備，破走之，仁盡復收諸叛縣而還。) Sanguozhi vol. 9.) Liu Bei then returned to Yuan Shao and urged him to ally with Liu Biao, the Governor of Jing Province. Yuan Shao sent Liu Bei with some troops to Runan Commandery to assist another rebel leader, Gong Du (共都/龔都). Liu Bei and Gong Du defeated and killed Cai Yang (蔡陽), one of Cao Cao's officers who led troops to attack them. (Note: (曹公與袁紹相拒於官渡，汝南黃巾劉辟等叛曹公應紹。紹遣先主將兵與辟等略許下。關羽亡歸先主。曹公遣曹仁將兵擊先主，先主還紹軍，陰欲離紹，乃說紹南連荊州牧劉表。紹遣先主將本兵復至汝南，與賊龔都等合，眾數千人。曹公遣蔡陽擊之，為先主所殺。) Sanguozhi vol. 32.)

Before killing Cai Yang, Liu Bei proclaimed: "I may be lacking in power but even if you were ten thousand still you couldn't defeat me. Only Cao Mengde would force me to flee." Indeed, Liu Bei defeated and killed Cai Yang along with others and fled when he learned that Cao Cao was leading an army. (Note: (公使將蔡楊擊之。先主謂曰：「吾勢雖不便，汝等百萬來，未如吾何。曹孟德單車來，吾自去。」楊等必戰，為先主所殺。) Huayang Guo Zhi vol. 6. Note that in Huayang, Cai's name was recorded as "楊".)

=== Taking refuge under Liu Biao (201–208) ===
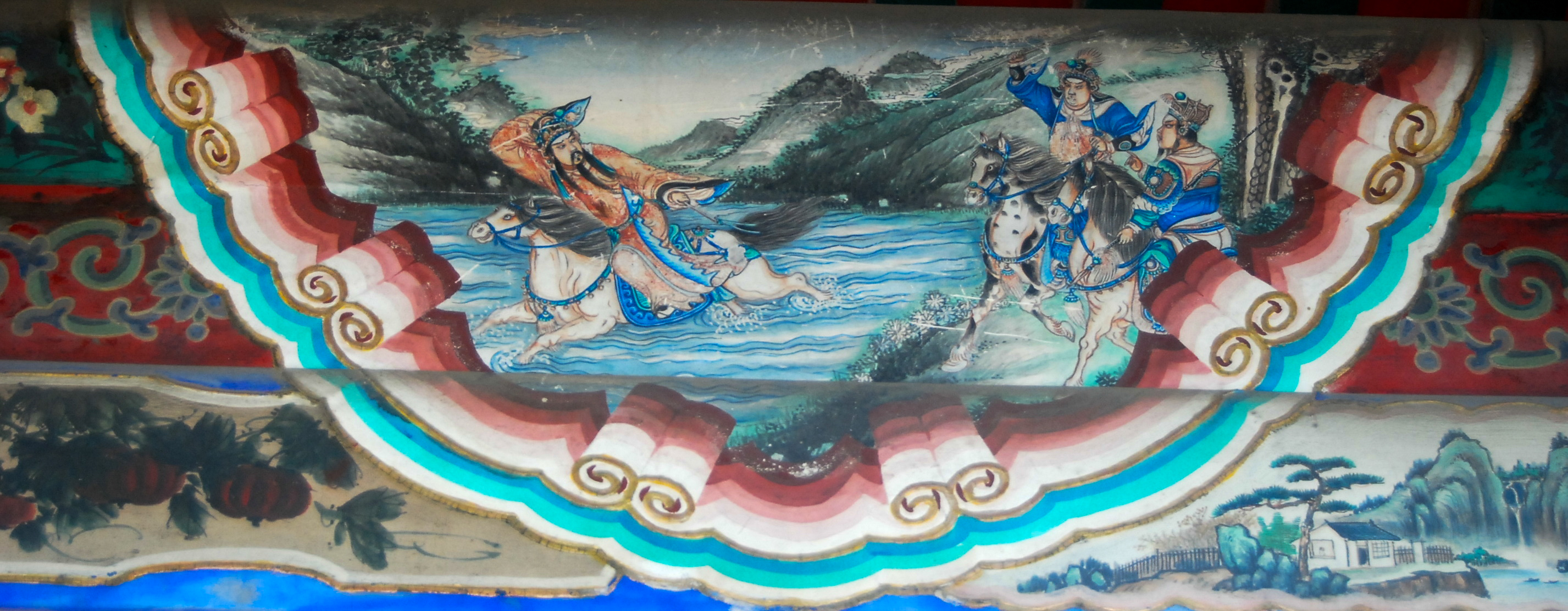
Liu Bei's horse leaps across the Tan Stream

In 201, Cao Cao led his army to attack Liu Bei in Runan Commandery after his victory over Yuan Shao at the Battle of Guandu. Liu Bei sent Mi Zhu and Sun Qian as ambassadors to Liu Biao. Liu Biao himself came to the outskirts to greet Liu Bei and his followers and treated them with utmost courtesy due an honoured guest. He gave him some troops and sent him to station at Xinye County in northern Jing Province to guard against Cao Cao's advances. Soon many men of talents joined Liu Bei and his rank greatly increased. Liu Biao didn't trust him completely and secretly guarded against Liu Bei. (Note: (曹公既破紹，自南擊先主。先主遣麋竺、孫乾與劉表相聞，表自郊迎，以上賓禮待之，益其兵，使屯新野。荊州豪傑歸先主者日益多，表疑其心，陰禦之。) Sanguozhi vol. 32.)

In 202, Liu Biao ordered Liu Bei to fend off Xiahou Dun, Yu Jin and the other officers at Bowang. Liu Bei led his army and set up an ambush. Eventually, he set fire to his own camp and faked a retreat. When Xiahou Dun led his soldiers to the pursuit, they were crushed by the troops lying in ambush at Battle of Bowang. (Note: (使拒夏侯惇、于禁等於博望。久之，先主設伏兵，一旦自燒屯偽遁，惇等追之，為伏兵所破。) Sanguozhi vol. 32.) Liu Bei stayed in Jing Province for about seven years. When he was talking with Liu Biao, he rose up to go to the toilet. Then, he noticed that the flesh in his thighs had increased, he sighed heavily and wept. When he returned to his seat, Liu Biao was surprised and asked him about it. Liu Bei replied: "When I was younger, I've never left the saddle. My thighs were thin. Now I do not ride anymore, they have grown. The days and months pass like a stream, and old age will come, but I have achieved nothing. That's why I am sad." (Note: (九州春秋曰：備住荊州數年，嘗於表坐起至廁，見髀裡肉生，慨然流涕。還坐，表怪問備，備曰：「吾常身不離鞍，髀肉皆消。今不復騎，髀裡肉生。日月若馳，老將至矣，而功業不建，是以悲耳。」) Jiuzhou Chunqiu annotation in Sanguozhi vol. 32.)

Once, Liu Bei camped at Fancheng with his soldiers. Liu Biao was friendly to him however he was also anxious about Liu Bei's conduct and did not place much trust in him. One day, had asked Liu Bei to join him for a banquet. Kuai Yue and Cai Mao however wanted to use this as an occasion to kill him. Liu Bei saw through this, pretended to go to the toilet and nimbly escaped. His horse was named Dilu (的盧), and he quickly rode him. However, during the pursuit, he fell into the waters of the Tan Stream west of Xiangyang city. Liu Bei was drowning and couldn't get away from the river. He then cried: "Dilu! Today I'm in dire straits! Give it your all!" Dilu then jumped three zhang (7 meters) in a single leap and thus both of them got across. Quickly they found a ferry and crossed the river. While they were at half of the river, the pursuers caught up to them and could only apologize on Liu Biao's behalf. (Note: (《世語》曰：備屯樊城，劉表禮焉，憚其為人，不甚信用。曾請備宴會，蒯越、蔡瑁欲因會取備，備覺之，偽如廁，潛遁出。所乘馬名的盧，騎的盧走，墮襄陽城西檀溪水中，溺不得出。備急曰：「的盧：今日厄矣，可努力！」的盧乃一踴三丈，遂得過，乘桴渡河，中流而追者至，以表意謝之，曰：「何去之速乎！」孫盛曰：此不然之言。備時羈旅，客主勢殊，若有此變，豈敢晏然終表之世而無釁故乎？此皆世俗妄說，非事實也。) Shiyu annotation in Sanguozhi vol. 32.)

In 207, Cao Cao planned a campaign to conquer the Wuhuan in the north but was apprehensive that Liu Biao might attack his base, however he was assured by Guo Jia that Liu Biao would not do so for fear of Liu Bei being more powerful than he was. Cao Cao agreed, and Guo Jia's point was proven later, when Liu Biao refused to attack Xu when Liu Bei advised him to do so. When Cao Cao returned from Liucheng. Liu Biao told to Liu Bei: "I didn't adopt your proposal and now I lost this great opportunity." Liu Bei answered: “Now the Tianxia is in chaos and every day there are battles. What seem to be a good opportunity may present himself later. If you are able to respond to them accordingly then this isn't worth regret." (Note: ([建安]十二年，曹公北征烏丸，先主說表襲許，表不能用。) Sanguozhi vol. 32.) (Note: (《漢晉春秋》曰：曹公自柳城還，表謂備曰：「不用君言，故為失此大會。」備曰：「今天下分裂，日尋干戈，事會之來，豈有終極乎？若能應之於後者，則此未足為恨也。」) Han Jin Chunqiu annotation in Sanguozhi vol. 32.)

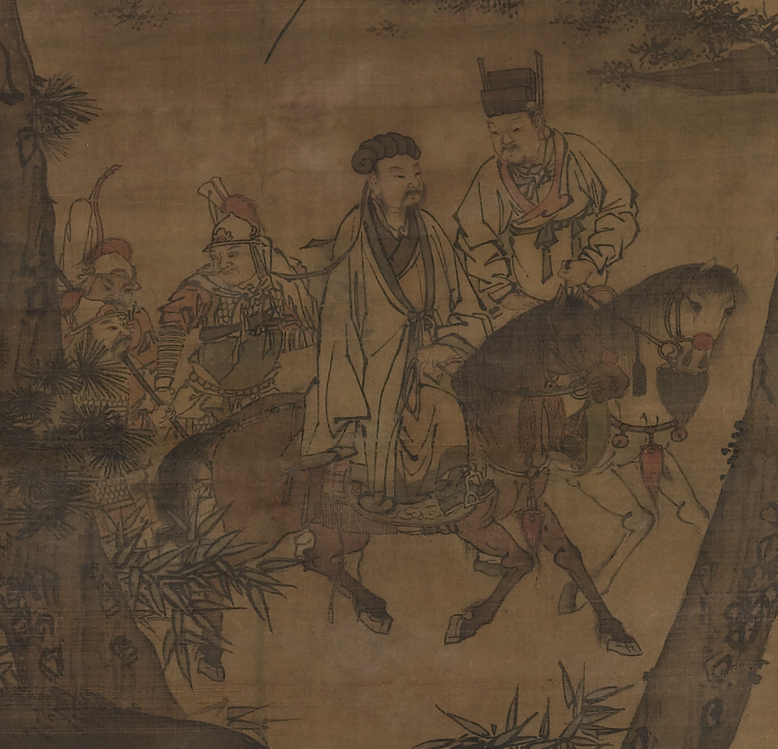
The painting Kongming Leaving the Mountains (detail, Ming dynasty), depicting Zhuge Liang (left, on a horse) leaving his rustic retreat to enter into the service of Liu Bei (right, on a horse)

Away from the battlefields in the east and under Liu Biao's efficient rule, Jing Province was prosperous and a popular destination for literati fleeing from the destruction of war. Liu Bei asked Sima Hui, a revered recluse, about scholars. Sima Hui's friend Pan Degong named Zhuge Liang and Pang Tong as exceptional talents who could comprehend important events of their time well. Xu Shu also urged Liu Bei to call on Zhuge Liang. Liu Bei went to see Zhuge Liang and finally had an audience with him after three visits. Zhuge Liang presented Liu Bei with his Longzhong Plan, a general long-term plan outlining the takeover of Jing Province and Yi Province to set up a two-pronged final strike at the imperial capital. (Note: (潁川徐〔庶〕元直，致瑯琊諸葛亮曰：「孔明，臥龍也。將軍願見之乎？」先主曰：「君與俱來。」庶曰：「此人可就見，不可屈致也。」先主遂造亮。凡三〔往〕。) Huayang Guo Zhi vol. 6.)

Liu Bei was greatly pleased and became a closer colleague of Zhuge Liang's each day saying that he felt like a fish that has found water. (Note: (先主曰：「善。」與亮情好日密，自以為猶魚得水也。) Huayang Guo Zhi vol. 6.)

According to the Wei Shu (魏書), when Liu Biao saw that his illness was serious, he planned to entrust Liu Bei with Jing province. Liu Biao told him: "My sons lack talent while all the generals are not up to the task. After my death, I wish for you to be in charge of this province." Liu Bei answered: "Your sons are all wise. I hope your Lordship recover from your illness." Among Liu Bei's retinue, some advised him to follow Liu Biao's suggestion. However Liu Bei told them: "Liu Biao treats me with generosity. If I followed this proposal, people would believe that I'm just looking after personal gains. I couldn’t bear that." (Note: (魏書曰：表病篤，託國於備，顧謂曰：「我兒不才，而諸將並零落，我死之後，卿便攝荊州。」備曰：「諸子自賢，君其憂病。」或勸備宜從表言，備曰：「此人待我厚，今從其言，人必以我為薄，所不忍也。」) Wei Shu annotation in Sanguozhi vol. 32.) The Records of Heroes also mentioned that when Liu Biao was ill, he sent a memorial to have Liu Bei promoted to Governor of Jing province. (Note: (《英雄記》曰：表病，上備領荊州刺史。) Yingxiong Ji annotation in Sanguozhi vol. 32.)

Pei Songzhi believed that as Liu Biao and his wife already had decided to remove the eldest son from the succession for a younger one they favoured, there would be no reason for him to provide Jing province to Liu Bei. Therefore, he said that those were incorrect statements. (Note: (臣松之以為表夫妻素愛琮，捨適立庶，情計久定，無緣臨終舉荊州以授備，此亦不然之言。) Pei Songzhi annotation in Sanguozhi vol. 32.)

Liu Biao died in 208 and his younger son Liu Cong succeeded him and surrendered to Cao Cao without informing Liu Bei. By the time Liu Bei heard news of Liu Cong's surrender, Cao Cao's army had already reached Wan. When he heard of his surrender, he had someone close to him ask about it. (Note: (子琮代立，遣使請降。先主屯樊，不知曹公卒至，至宛乃聞之，遂將其眾去。) Sanguozhi vol. 32.) Liu Zhong then sent Song Zhong (宋忠) to Liu Bei. When they met, Cao Cao was in Wan and Liu Bei was furious. He said to Song Zhong: "All of you act in such an undesirable way and have not been honest with us from the start. Now only when catastrophe is near do you dare to show your face. Are you thinking of me as a fool?" Liu Bei pulled his sword on Song Zhong and said: "If I were to behead you now, it would quell my rage. However, it would be a shame for a man of my stature to kill someone like you when they are about to fall." Liu Bei sent Song Zhong away and summoned his officers to discuss of the next strategy. Among them, some wanted Liu Bei to persuade Liu Zhong, his officials and the nobles (吏士) of Jing province to flee south to Jiangling. However, Liu Bei replied: "When Liu Biao was near death, he gave me responsibility for his orphaned sons. Now I would have to betray him and his trust to save myself and this isn't something I am ready to do. After death, how could I face him!" (Note: (琮令宋忠詣備宣旨。是時曹公在宛，備乃大驚駭，謂忠曰：「卿諸人作事如此，不早相語，今禍至方告我，不亦太劇乎！」引刀向忠曰：「今斷卿頭，不足以解忿，亦恥大丈夫臨別復殺卿輩！」遣忠去，乃呼部曲議。或勸備劫將琮及荊州吏士徑南到江陵，備答曰：「劉荊州臨亡託我以孤遺，背信自濟，吾所不為，死何面目以見劉荊州乎！」) Sanguozhi vol. 32.)

Liu Bei led his troops away and abandoned Fancheng, leading civilians and his followers on an exodus to the south. Around this time, Zhuge Liang advised Liu Bei to launch an attack on Liu Cong, so that Jing province could belong to him. Liu Bei answered that he couldn't bear to do it. (Note: (過襄陽，諸葛亮說先主攻琮，荊州可有。先主曰：「吾不忍也。」孔衍《漢魏春秋》曰：劉琮乞降，不敢告備。備亦不知，久之乃覺，遣所親問琮。) Sanguozhi vol. 32.) Then he passed near Liu Cong's city and wanted to see him. However, Liu Cong was afraid and would not move. Many of Liu Cong's supporters and the people of Jing joined him. Around this time, Liu Bei took his leave at Liu Biao's grave. He wept at the situation facing Jing province. (Note: (乃駐馬呼琮，琮懼不能起。琮左右及荊州人多歸先主。) Sanguozhi vol. 32.) (Note: (《典略》曰：備過辭表墓，遂涕泣而去。) Dianlüe annotation in Sanguozhi vol. 32.)

By the time they reached Dangyang (當陽; south of present-day Duodao District, Jingmen, Hubei), his followers numbered more than 100,000 and they moved only 10 li a day. Liu Bei sent Guan Yu ahead to wait for him in Jiangling, where abundant supplies and an arsenal were stored, with Jing Province's fleet. Among Liu Bei's followers, some said to him: “You should move fast and then hold Jiangling. Although our force is large, few among us have military equipment. If Cao Cao's army comes, how will you stop him?” Liu Bei answered to them: “In coping with a situation one must always consider men as fundamental. Now that men are joining me, how can I reject them!” (Note: (比到當陽，眾十餘萬，輜重數千兩，日行十餘里，別遣關羽乘船數百艘，使會江陵。或謂先主曰：「宜速行保江陵，今雖擁大眾，被甲者少，若曹公兵至，何以拒之？」先主曰：「夫濟大事必以人為本，今人歸吾，吾何忍棄去！」習鑿齒曰：先主雖顛沛險難而信義愈明，勢偪事危而言不失道。追景升之顧，則情感三軍；戀赴義之士，則甘與同敗。觀其所以結物情者，豈徒投醪撫寒含蓼問疾而已哉！其終濟大業，不亦宜乎！) Sanguozhi vol. 32.)

Xi Zuochi commented about this: "Although the Former Lord faced many difficulties, along the way his faith and loyalty became even clearer. As the situation became worrysome and danger even closer, his words didn't stray away from reason. When he remembered how Liu Biao had treated him, his sentiments touched all the soldiers among the army. When he personally cared for those serving righteousness, all were ready to share defeat with him. Looking at the way he could establish strong bonds with others, how could he not act as such! Wouldn't it be appropriate that he managed to bring a great entreprise to its conclusion!" (Note: (習鑿齒曰：先主雖顛沛險難而信義愈明，勢偪事危而言不失道。追景升之顧，則情感三軍；戀赴義之士，則甘與同敗。觀其所以結物情者，豈徒投醪撫寒含蓼問疾而已哉！其終濟大業，不亦宜乎！) Xi Zuochi annotation in Sanguozhi vol. 32.)

Afraid that Liu Bei might reach Jiangling County which had military stores before he did, Cao Cao led his cavalry on a pursuit to Xiangyang. When he learned that Liu Bei had already passed through there, he urged his 5000 elite troops to move as quickly as possible. In a day and a night they covered over 300 li and Cao Cao caught up with Liu Bei and captured most of his people and baggage at the Battle of Changban. Leaving his family behind, Liu Bei fled with only scores of followers. He made it to the Han Ford where he met with Guan Yu's fleet, they crossed the Mian River to Jiangxia Commandery and the Yangtze River to Xiakou, where they took shelter with Liu Qi, Liu Biao's elder son and met up with over 10,000 followers. Liu Qi objected to his brother's surrender to Cao Cao and was able to maintain Jiangxia Commandery and Xiakou allowing more of his father's former subordinates to escape from Cao Cao. (Note: (曹公以江陵有軍實，恐先主據之，乃釋輜重，輕軍到襄陽。聞先主已過，曹公將精騎五千急追之，一日一夜行三百餘里，及於當陽之長坂。先主棄妻子，與諸葛亮、張飛、趙雲等數十騎走，曹公大獲其人眾輜重。先主斜趨漢津，適與羽船會，得濟沔，遇表長子江夏太守琦眾萬餘人，與俱到夏口。) Sanguozhi vol. 32.) Following this, Zhuge Liang told Liu Bei that the situation was critical and pressed Liu Bei to grant him authority to start an alliance with Sun Quan. (Note: (亮曰：「事急矣！請奉命求救於孫將軍。」) Huayang Guo Zhi vol. 6.)

== Alliance with Sun Quan ==
=== Battles of Red Cliffs and Jiangling (208–211) ===
When Liu Bei was still at Dangyang, Lu Su met him, discussed with him of the situation in the empire and hinted that he should ally with the warlord Sun Quan against Cao Cao. After that, Lu Su asked Liu Bei where he wanted to go next. Liu Bei answered that he and Wu Ju (吳巨) the Administrator of Cangwu Commandery were friends and that he desired to join him. Lu Su told Liu Bei: "Sun Quan is talented and kind. His treats both the elites and the worthies with respect. All the heroes from the south of the Yangtze river already joined him. He also holds the six commanderies, his troops trained and the supplies abundant. You should join him. Now, I propose this plan to you. You should send a confidant of you as an envoy to the east and establish connections, promote the gains of this alliance and together we shall follow the same goal. But you speak of Wu Ju. He has no talents and command a distant commandery. He will soon be under another. How could you entrust yourself to him?" Liu Bei agreed with Lu Su. (Note: (先主遣諸葛亮自結於孫權，) Sanguozhi vol. 32.) (Note: (《江表傳》曰：孫權遣魯肅弔劉表二子，並令與備相結。肅未至而曹公已濟漢津。肅故進前，與備相遇於當陽。因宣權旨，論天下事勢，致殷勤之意。且問備曰：「豫州今欲何至？」備曰：「與蒼梧太守〔吳巨〕有舊，欲往投之。」肅曰：「孫討虜聰明仁惠，敬賢禮士，江表英豪，咸歸附之，已據有六郡，兵精糧多，足以立事。今為君計，莫若遣腹心使自結於東，崇連和之好，共濟世業，而云欲投〔吳巨〕，〔巨〕是凡人，偏在遠郡，行將為人所併，豈足託乎？」備大喜，進住鄂縣，即遣諸葛亮隨肅詣孫權，結同盟誓。) Jiang Biao Zhuan annotation in Sanguozhi vol. 32.)

Zhuge Liang, as Liu Bei's representative, followed Lu Su to meet Sun Quan at Chaisang County (柴桑縣; southwest of present-day Jiujiang, Jiangxi), where they discussed the formation of a Sun–Liu alliance against Cao Cao. Sun Quan already knew of Liu Bei great reputation and was impressed by Zhuge Liang's exceptional eloquence. Therefore, Liu Bei and Sun Quan formed their first alliance against the southward expansion of Cao Cao. (Note: (時權軍柴桑，既服先主大名，又悅亮奇雅，) Huayang Guo Zhi vol. 6.)

Liu Bei followed Lu Su's plan and led his army to Fankou (樊口). While Zhuge Liang was still on his diplomatic trip to Wu; Cao Cao had already led his vast army from the north and was near. Hearing about this, Liu Bei was afraid. Each day, he sent a scout to learn if Sun Quan's army arrived. One day, the scout reported that Zhou Yu's army was here. Liu Bei asked him if it wasn't Cao Cao's armies from Xu and Qing provinces. However the scout reassured him that he recognized Zhou Yu's boats. Liu Bei had a messenger sent to them. Zhou Yu told the messenger that he couldn't move because of his duty but wished to see and assist Liu Bei. Liu Bei told to Guan Yu and Zhang Fei that after they make contact and established the alliance, It wouldn't be fair to them to refuse their invitation then joined Zhou Yu via a single boat. He told Zhou Yu that they needed a plan to defeat Cao Cao and asked about the number of troops he had. Zhou Yu answered 30 000 which Liu Bei felt was not enough. Zhou Yu insisted that It would be enough for his plan and he only needs to watch him destroy Cao Cao's army. Liu Bei wished to deliberate with the others. Zhou Yu told him that he couldn't leave his post and if he wanted to discuss with Lu Su, he could separately go see him, he also adds that Zhuge Liang would be here in 2 or 3 days. Liu Bei felt disconcerted and although he knew of Zhou Yu's talent didn't believe he would defeat Cao Cao. Therefore, along with 2 000 soldiers, Guan Yu and Zhang Fei refuse to link his own force with Zhou Yu allowing a position where he could either advance or withdraw. (Note: (江表傳曰：備從魯肅計，進住鄂縣之樊口。諸葛亮詣吳未還，備聞曹公軍下，恐懼，日遣邏吏於水次候望權軍。吏望見瑜船，馳往白備，備曰：「何以知（之）非青徐軍邪？」吏對曰：「以船知之。」備遣人慰勞之。瑜曰：「有軍任，不可得委署，儻能屈威，誠副其所望。」備謂關羽、張飛曰：「彼欲致我，我今自結託於東而不往，非同盟之意也。」乃乘單舸往見瑜，問曰：「今拒曹公，深為得計。戰卒有幾？」瑜曰：「三萬人。」備曰：「恨少。 」瑜曰：「此自足用，豫州但觀瑜破之。」備欲呼魯肅等共會語，瑜曰：「受命不得妄委署，若欲見子敬，可別過之。又孔明已俱來，不過三兩日到也。」備雖深愧異瑜，而心未許之能必破北軍也，故差池在後，將二千人與羽、飛俱，未肯係瑜，蓋為進退之計也。) Jiang Biao Zhuan annotation in Sanguozhi vol. 32.)

Sun Sheng about this commented: "Liu Bei was a hero. He put himself in a position of certain defeat and reported his predicament to Wu. After he received their help, there was no need for scout and strategy to withdraw. The statements from the Jiang Biao Zhuan (江表傳) are from the documents of the people of Wu therefore offer their one-sided favorable version of those events." (Note: (孫盛曰：劉備雄才，處必亡之地，告急於吳，而獲奔助，無緣復顧望江渚而懷後計。江表傳之言，當是吳人欲專美之辭。) Sun Sheng's annotation in Sanguozhi vol. 32.)

Both sides clashed at the Battle of Red Cliffs, which concluded with a decisive victory for the Sun–Liu side. Liu Bei and the Sun troops advanced by land and water until Cao Cao was pushed to Nan Commandery. Cao Cao retreated north after his defeat and left behind Cao Ren and Xu Huang to guard Jiangling County and Yue Jin to defend Xiangyang. (Note: (與曹公戰於赤壁，大破之，焚其舟船。先主與吳軍水陸並進，追到南郡，時又疾疫，北軍多死，曹公引歸。) Sanguozhi vol. 32.) (Note: (即遣周瑜、程普水軍三萬助先主拒曹公，大破公軍於赤壁，焚其舫舟。) Huayang Guo Zhi vol. 6.)

Sun Quan's forces, led by Zhou Yu, attacked Cao Ren after their resounding victory to wrestle for control of Jiangling County. According to the Records of the Three Kingdoms, Liu Bei recommended Liu Qi to be the new Inspector of Jing Province and led his men to capture the four commanderies in southern Jing Province – Changsha (長沙) led by Han Xuan, Lingling (零陵) led by Liu Du, Guiyang led by Zhao Fan and Wuling led by Jin Xuan. Lei Xu (雷緒) of Lujiang (廬江) also amassed many followers and led ten thousand of soldiers to Liu Bei. Liu Bei set up his base at Gong'an County and continued to strengthen his forces. (Note: (先主表琦為荊州刺史，又南征四郡。武陵太守金旋、長沙太守韓玄、桂陽太守趙範、零陵太守劉度皆降。) Sanguozhi vol. 32.) (Note: (《三輔決錄注》曰：金旋字元機，京兆人，歷位黃門郎，漢陽太守，徵拜議郎，遷中郎將，領武陵太守，為備所攻劫死。子禕，事見《魏武本紀》。廬江雷緒率部曲數萬口稽顙。) Sanfu Jue Lu Zhu annotation in Sanguozhi vol. 32.) While the Jiang Biao Zhuan (江表傳) gives a more favorable account of Sun Quan's forces. According to it, following their victory, Zhou Yu divided some area to the south for Liu Bei. Liu Bei established his camp at Youjiangkou (油江口) latter called Gong'an County. Many of Liu Biao's officers and scholars who were previously forced to join the northern armies rebelled and used this opportunity to join Liu Bei. Rather than conquer the southern commanderies, Liu Bei believed that the territory given to him was too small to secure his people and therefore received them from Sun Quan. (Note: (《江表傳》曰：周瑜為南郡太守，分南岸地以給備。備別立營於油江口，改名為公安。劉表吏士見從北軍，多叛來投備。備以瑜所給地少，不足以安民，（後）〔復〕從權借荊州數郡。) Jiang Biao Zhuan annotation in Sanguozhi vol. 32.)

When Liu Qi died in 209 shortly after Liu Bei secured his position in southern Jing Province. All of Liu Qi's followers wanted for Liu Bei to succeed him as the new Inspector of Jing Province with his administrative seat at Gongan which he accepted. To further strengthen the Sun–Liu alliance, Liu Bei travelled to Sun Quan's territory to marry Sun Quan's younger sister, Lady Sun. After the political marriage, Sun Quan not only recognised the legitimacy of Liu Bei's control over southern Jing Province, but also agreed to "lend" Nan Commandery to him. (Note: (琦病死，羣下推先主為荊州牧，治公安。權稍畏之，進妹固好。先主至京見權，綢繆恩紀。 Sanguozhi vol. 32.) (Note: (《山陽公載記》曰：備還，謂左右曰：「孫車騎長上短下，其難為下，吾不可以再見之。」乃晝夜兼行。臣松之案：魏書載劉備與孫權語，與蜀志述諸葛亮與權語正同。劉備未破魏軍之前，尚未與孫權相見，不得有此說。故知蜀志為是。) Shanyang Gong Zaiji annotation in Sanguozhi vol. 32.)

Sun Quan sent an envoy to Liu Bei and expressed his desire for both of them to conquer Yi province. The emissary reported to Liu Bei: "The Rice Bandit, Zhang Lu has made his base in Ba and acted as a king. He served as Cao Cao's eyes and ears and wants to conquer Yi province. Liu Zhang is weak and can't defend himself. If Cao Cao gained Yi province the Jing would be in danger! Now, you should first conquer Liu Zhang then Zhang Lu. The tail and the head are connected. Once we united Wu and Chu even if there is ten Cao Cao, there would be no need for worry." (Note: (權遣使云欲共取蜀，或以為宜報聽許，吳終不能越荊有蜀，蜀地可為己有。) Sanguozhi vol. 32.) (Note: (《獻帝春秋》曰：孫權欲與備共取蜀，遣使報備曰：「米賊張魯居王巴、漢，為曹操耳目，規圖益州。劉璋不武，不能自守。若操得蜀，則荊州危矣。今欲先攻取璋，進討張魯，首尾相連，一統吳、楚，雖有十操，無所憂也。」) Xiandi Chunqiu annotation in Sanguozhi vol. 32.)

Liu Bei's officers thought Liu Bei should conquer this land alone since Sun Quan couldn't extend his land beyond Jing province. Yin Guan (殷觀) at this time was master of records of Jing province, he said: "If you act as the vanguard for Sun Quan and moved your army but fall to conquer Yi province then while you are away, Sun Quan could use this to his advantage, and everything would be lost! For the time being, you should only encourage his attack on Yi while you explain that you recently conquered several commanderies and cannot act yet. Sun Quan would not dare to pass through us to take Yi alone. With such a strategy of advance and withdrawal, you can reap both the benefits of Sun Quan and the Yi province.” Liu Bei agreed and followed this plan, he then had Yin Guan promoted to be mounted escort attendant. (Note: (荊州主簿殷觀進曰：「若為吳先驅，進未能克蜀，退為吳所乘，即事去矣。今但可然贊其伐蜀，而自說新據諸郡，未可興動，吳必不敢越我而獨取蜀。如此進退之計，可以收吳、蜀之利。」先主從之，權果輟計。遷觀為別駕從事。) Sanguozhi vol. 32.)

And so, Liu Bei answered to Sun Quan: "The people of Yi province are strong and rich moreover the land is hard to conquer. Even if Liu Zhang is weak, he can defend himself. Zhang Lu is crafty and may not be loyal to Cao Cao. Now with the fierce soldiers of Yi and the complicate terrain, the battle is far harder and may be something that Wu Qi couldn't accomplish even less an officer of Sun. Even if Cao Cao wanted to destitute the emperor, he still is officially his protector. And when the civils saw his defeat at Cibhi, they said that his ambition was over, and his power ended. However, he already possesses two thirds of the empire, and he surely wants to take his horse to the farest of the world and led his army to Wu-Gui Commanderies. Why would he allow us to expend ourselves while waiting for his death? Now if we were to attack an ally (Liu Zhang) without reason, Cao Cao would use this opportunity to crush us while we are infighting. This is not a good plan." (Note: (備欲自圖蜀，拒答不聽，曰：益州民富彊，土地險阻，劉璋雖弱，足以自守。張魯虛偽，未必盡忠於操。今暴師於蜀、漢，轉運於萬里，欲使戰克攻取，舉不失利，此吳起不能定其規，孫武不能善其事也。曹操雖有無君之心，而有奉主之名，議者見操失利於赤壁，謂其力屈，無復遠志也。今操三分天下已有其二，將欲飲馬於滄海，觀兵於吳會，何肯守此坐須老乎？今同盟無故自相攻伐，借樞於操，使敵承其隙，非長計也。) Sanguozhi vol. 32.)

Sun Quan didn't listen and sent Sun Yu to lead his troops and camped at Xiakou (夏口). However, Liu Bei blocked this army and would not allow them to pass. He said to Sun Yu: "If you take Yi then I shall let my hair down, go into the mountains and become a hermit so I would not lose the trust of the empire."Also he ordered Guan Yu to encamp at Jiangling, Zhang Fei at Zigui, Zhuge Liang in Nan commandery and Liu Bei himself led his men at Zhanling. When Sun Quan saw this, he grasped Liu Bei's intentions and had to order Sun Yu to return. (Note: (權不聽，遣孫瑜率水軍住夏口。備不聽軍過，謂瑜曰：「汝欲取蜀，吾當被髮入山，不失信於天下也。」使關羽屯江陵，張飛屯秭歸，諸葛亮據南郡，備自住孱陵。權知備意，因召瑜還。) Sanguozhi vol. 32.)

Subsequently, former subordinates of Liu Biao who were unwilling to serve Cao Cao came to join Liu Bei. After the death of Zhou Yu in 210 and Liu Bei's growing influence in southern Jing Province, Sun Quan's position in the north became more untenable. Lu Su succeeded Zhou Yu as the frontline commander of Sun Quan's armies and moved the headquarters to Lukou (陸口), yielding all commanderies of Jing Province (except Jiangxia Commandery) and access to Yi Province to Liu Bei.

Summary of major events
161	Born in Zhuo County, Zhuo Commandery.
184	Volunteered in the fight against the Yellow Turban rebels.
194	Assumed governorship of Xu Province.
198	Defeated by Lü Bu. Allied with Cao Cao and won the Battle of Xiapi.
200	Defeated by Cao Cao. Escaped to join Yuan Shao. Joined Liu Biao.
208	Allied with Sun Quan and won the Battle of Red Cliffs. Took over Jing Province.
214	Defeated Liu Zhang and took over Yi Province.
219	Conquered Hanzhong. Declared himself King of Hanzhong.
221	Proclaimed himself Emperor of Shu Han.
222	Lost the Battle of Xiaoting against Eastern Wu.
223	Died in Baidicheng.

== Establishing the Shu kingdom ==
=== Conquering Yi Province (211–214) ===
In 211, Liu Zhang, the Governor of Yi Province (covering present-day Sichuan and Chongqing), heard that Cao Cao planned to attack the warlord Zhang Lu in Hanzhong Commandery. As Hanzhong Commandery was a strategic location and the northern "gateway" into Yi Province, Liu Zhang was afraid. At this time, the mounted escort Zhang Song told him: "Cao Cao's armies are strong and without a match in the empire. If he was able to use Zhang Lu's grain stores and launch an invasion of Yi province, who could stop him." Liu Zhang answered that he was worried but without a plan. Zhang Song answered: "Liu Bei is of the same clan as you and he is an unstoppable rival of Cao Cao. He commands troops with talent. If we used him to conquer Zhang Lu, Zhang Lu would surely be defeated. With Zhang Lu vanquished, Yi province would be safe and even if Cao Cao were to come, he would be defeated." (Note: (十六年，益州牧劉璋遙聞曹公將遣鍾繇等向漢中討張魯，內懷恐懼。別駕從事蜀郡張松說璋曰：「曹公兵強無敵於天下，若因張魯之資以取蜀土，誰能御之者乎？」璋曰：「吾固憂之而未有計。」松曰：「劉豫州，使君之宗室而曹公之深讎也，善用兵，若使之討魯，魯必破。魯破，則益州強，曹公雖來，無能為也。」) Sanguozhi vol. 32.)

After listening to the advice from Zhang Song, Liu Zhang sent Fa Zheng with 4000 men to form an alliance with Liu Bei and presented him with many expensive gifts. Zhang Song and Fa Zheng privately disapproved of Liu Zhang's governance and looked at Liu Bei as a solution for a legitimate successor. When Liu Bei met them, he welcomed them warmly and treated them with kindness. He used this opportunity to learn more about Yi province, mostly the weaponry, stores, and number of horses, as well as other strategic locations and their distances to each other. Zhang Song and his entourage told him about everything and furthermore drew a map of Yi province with the location of the mountains and rivers. With their help, Liu Bei learned all about Yi province. Liu Zhang invited Liu Bei to join him in Yi Province to capture Hanzhong Commandery before Cao Cao did. (Note: (璋然之，遣法正將四千人迎先主，前後賂遺以巨億計。正因陳益州可取之策。) Sanguozhi vol. 32.) (Note: (《吳書》曰：備前見張松，後得法正，皆厚以恩意接納，盡其殷勤之歡。因問蜀中闊狹，兵器府庫人馬眾寡，及諸要害道里遠近，松等具言之，又畫地圖山川處所，由是盡知益州虛實也。) Wu Shu annotation in Sanguozhi vol. 32.)

Liu Bei led an expedition force of several ten thousand soldiers into Yi Province after leaving behind Zhuge Liang, Guan Yu, Zhang Fei and Zhao Yun to guard Jing Province. Liu Zhang welcomed Liu Bei, when they saw each other, both of them were friendly. Before this, Zhang Song told Fa Zheng to report to Liu Bei that with Pang Tong's backing, they could ambush Liu Zhang at the meeting spot. However, Liu Bei thought that the plan was too hasty for such an important act. (Note: (先主留諸葛亮、關羽等據荊州，將步卒數萬人入益州。至涪，璋自出迎，相見甚歡。張松令法正白先主，及謀臣龐統進說，便可於會所襲璋。先主曰：「此大事也，不可倉卒。」) Sanguozhi vol. 32.)

Liu Zhang then sent a proposition to have Liu Bei be made Commander in Chief and colonel director of the retainers. Liu Bei also proposed Liu Zhang to be General Who Subdues The West and Gouvernor of Yi province. Liu Zhang provided him with more troops under his command and have him supervised the White River Army. With those reinforcement, Liu Bei's army was over 30 000 men with plenty of weapons and horses. While Liu Zhang left for Chengdu, Liu Bei headed to Jiameng Pass (southwest of present-day Guangyuan, Sichuan) at the border between Liu Zhang and Zhang Lu's territories. Instead of engaging Zhang Lu, Liu Bei halted his advance and focused on building connections and gaining influence around the area. He was kind and virtuous and so he soon gained the hearts of the masses (Note: (璋推先主行大司馬，領司隸校尉；先主亦推璋行鎮西大將軍，領益州牧。璋增先主兵，使擊張魯，又令督白水軍。先主並軍三萬餘人，車甲器械資貨甚盛。是歲，璋還成都。先主北到葭萌，未即討魯，厚樹恩德，以收眾心。) Sanguozhi vol. 32.)

Next year, in 212, Cao Cao launched a campaign against Sun Quan, and he soon called Liu Bei for help. Liu Bei sent a messenger to Liu Zhang: "Cao Cao campaigned against Sun and now they are in danger. Both me and them were like "lips and teeth". Moreover, Guan Yu is fighting against Yue Jian at Qingni (清泥). If I don't go to help him now and he is defeated, then he will invade Jing province and the danger will be greater than Zhang Lu. Zhang Lu is looking to preserve his state. He isn't worth worrying about." Liu Bei requested another 10,000 soldiers and additional provisions to defend Jing Province. Liu Zhang gave him only 4,000 troops and half the supplies he requested. Liu Bei used this as a way to motivate his troops: "I'm fighting the enemies of the province. My men are tired and cannot enjoy a peaceful life, while Liu Zhang amasses wealth in his palaces but reward merits feebly. He hopes for the worthy and the brave to go fight in his place. But how can he think as such?" (Note: (明年，曹公徵孫權，權呼先主自救。先主遣使告璋曰：「曹公徵吳，吳憂危急。孫氏與孤本為脣齒，又樂進在青泥與關羽相拒，今不往救羽，進必大克，轉侵州界，其憂有甚於魯。魯自守之賊，不足慮也。」乃從璋求萬兵及資（寶），欲以東行。璋但許兵四千，其餘皆給半。) Sanguozhi vol. 32.) (Note: (《魏書》曰：備因激怒其眾曰：「吾為益州徵強敵，師徒勤瘁，不遑寧居；今積帑藏之財而吝於賞功，望士大夫為出死力戰，其可得乎！」}}) Wei Shu annotation in Sanguozhi vol. 32.)

To set into motion their plan, Fa Zheng and Meng Da joined Liu Bei's side while Zhang Song would stay at Chengdu to serve as a double agent. Zhang Song was worried that Liu Bei would indeed leave. He sent a letter to him and Fa Zheng where he reminded them not to give up and leave now that success is near. At this time, Zhang Su (張肅), Zhang Song's brother, discovered his brother's secret communications with Liu Bei and reported the issue to Liu Zhang. Liu Zhang was furious and stunned when he heard that Zhang Song had been helping Liu Bei to take over Yi Province from him – he executed Zhang Song and ordered his officers guarding the passes to Chengdu to keep secret documents and letters to Liu Bei. (Note: (張松書與先主及法正曰：「今大事垂可立，如何釋此去乎！」松兄廣漢太守肅，懼禍逮己，白璋發其謀。於是璋收斬松，嫌隙始構矣。 璋敕關戍諸將文書勿複關通先主。) Sanguozhi vol. 32.)

When Liu Bei found out about this, he was furious. Before Yang Huai (楊懷) and Gao Pei (高沛), Liu Zhang's subordinates guarding Boshui Pass, knew about Liu Bei's true motive, he lured them into a trap and executed them for behaving disrespectfully towards him. He took command of Yang Huai's and Gao Pei's troops afterwards. Next, Liu Bei had Huang Zhong and Zhuo Ying lead his soldiers against Liu Zhang. When he entered the different passes, he took the commanders as hostage along with their family. He then advanced with his troops and turned to attack Fu County (涪縣; present-day Mianyang, Sichuan). (Note: (先主大怒，召璋白水軍督楊懷，責以無禮，斬之。乃使黃忠、卓膺勒兵向璋。先主徑至關中，質諸將並士卒妻子，引兵與忠、膺等進到涪，據其城。) Sanguozhi vol. 32.)

In the spring of 213, Liu Zhang sent Liu Gui, Ling Bao, Zhang Ren, Deng Xian, Wu Yi and other officers to stop him at Fu. However, all were soundly defeated and had to retreat to Mianzhu. They were killed or captured by Liu Bei's forces. Despite being the most trusted vassal of Liu Zhang, Wu Yi soon changed allegiance. Li Yan and Fei Guan were sent to help them at Mianzhu, but they surrendered to Liu Bei as well. Liu Bei's army was getting stronger, and he sent commanders to pacify the other prefectures. Among them were Zhuge Liang, Zhang Fei, Zhao Yun. They led their army and pacified Baidi, Jiangzhou and Jiangyang. Only Guan Yu stayed behind to defend Jing province. (Note: (璋遣劉跂、冷苞、張任、鄧賢等拒先主於涪，皆破敗，退保綿竹。璋復遣李嚴督綿竹諸軍，嚴率眾降先主。先主軍益強，分遣諸將平下屬縣，諸葛亮、張飛、趙雲等將兵溯流定白帝、江州、江陽，惟關羽留鎮荊州。先主進軍圍雒；時璋子循守城，被攻且一年。) Sanguozhi vol. 32.)

Now the remnant force was under command of Liu Zhang's son, Liu Xun, and he retreated to Luo County (northwest of Chengdu, Sichuan). There, Pang Tong was killed by a stray arrow, and the siege became a prolonged one for nearly a year. In 214, Luo County fell to Liu Bei. (Note: (十九年夏，雒城破) Sanguozhi vol. 32.) Previously, when Liu Bei launched his campaign against Liu Zhang; Zhao Jian (趙戩) a Wei official who served as a clerk in the chancellor's office believed Liu Bei would fall mentioning his past failures and Yi's natural defences. However Fu Gan (傅幹) chastised him and said: "Liu Bei is generous and lenient; his men are willing to fight to the death for him. Zhuge Liang is a perceptive administrator able to adapt to changing situations. He is honorable, talented in planning and worked as his chancellor. Zhang Fei and Guan Yu are brave and also possess righteousness. Both of them are known as warriors who are a match for ten thousand men (萬人敵) and are his commanders. These three men are heroes. Knowing of Liu Bei's awareness along with those three heroes assisting him. How he could not succeed?" (Note: (傅子曰：初，劉備襲蜀，丞相掾趙戩曰：“劉備其不濟乎？拙於用兵，每戰則敗，奔亡不暇，何以圖人？蜀雖小區，險固四塞，獨守之國，難卒並也。”徵士傅幹曰：“劉備寬仁有度，能得人死力。諸葛亮達治知變，正而有謀，而為之相；張飛、關羽勇而有義，皆萬人之敵，而為之將：此三人者，皆人傑也。以備之略，三傑佐之，何為不濟也？”) Fu Zi annotation in Sanguozhi vol. 32.)

Liu Zhang continued to hold up inside Chengdu. Ma Chao, a former warlord and vassal under Zhang Lu, defected to Liu Bei's side and joined him in attacking Chengdu. Although Chengdu's citizens were terrified by Ma Chao's army, they insisted on putting up a desperate fight against the enemy. (Note: (先主遣人迎超，超將兵徑到城下。城中震怖) Sanguozhi vol. 36.) However, Liu Zhang surrendered to Liu Bei after stating that he did not wish to see further bloodshed. (Note: (城中尚有精兵三萬人，谷帛支一年，吏民咸欲死戰。璋言：「父子在州二十餘年，無恩德以加百姓。百姓攻戰三年，肌膏草野者，以璋故也，何心能安！」遂開城出降，群下莫不流涕。) Sanguozhi vol. 31.) Liu Bei then succeeded Liu Zhang as the Governor of Yi Province and relocated him to Gong'an County in Jing Province. The Yi province was rich and prosper, Liu Bei had a banquet prepared for the officers and soldiers. He used the gold and silver to repay them and distributed fabrics and grain to the common people. (Note: (蜀中殷盛豐樂，先主置酒大饗士卒，取蜀城中金銀分賜將士，還其穀帛。) Sanguozhi vol. 32.)

Liu Bei married Wu Yi's sister and went on numerous public tours to consolidate his control on the newly conquered Yi Province. He promoted Zhuge Liang to an office that granted him control over all affairs of state and appointed Dong He as Zhuge Liang's deputy. Fa Zheng as his strategist. Guan Yu, Zhang Fei and Ma Chao as his commanders. Xu Jing, Mi Zhu and Jian Yong as his guests. The rest of Liu Bei's followers, new and old, were entrusted with new responsibilities and promoted to new ranks with Liu Zhang's followers promoted into prominent positions so their talents would not be wasted. Among the talented with ambitions, all competed for Liu Bei's attention. (Note: (先主復領益州牧，諸葛亮為股肱，法正為謀主，關羽、張飛、馬超為爪牙，許靖、麋竺、簡雍為賓友。及董和、黃權、李嚴等本璋之所授用也，吳壹、費觀等又璋之婚親也，彭羕又璋之所排擯也，劉巴者宿昔之所忌恨也，皆處之顯任，盡其器能。有誌之士，無不競勸。) Sanguozhi vol. 32.)

=== Sun–Liu territorial dispute (215–217) ===
After Liu Bei's conquest of Yi Province, Sun Quan sent Lu Su as an emissary to demand the return of the commanderies in Jing Province, but Liu Bei refused and told him to wait until he took Liang province. Sun Quan was furious then sent Lü Meng and Ling Tong to lead 20,000 men to attack southern Jing Province and they succeeded in capturing Changsha, Guiyang and Lingling commanderies. In the meantime, Lu Su and Gan Ning advanced to Yiyang County with 10,000 men to block Guan Yu) and took over command of the army at Lukou. Liu Bei personally went to Gong'an County with 50 000 soldiers while Guan Yu led 30,000 men to Yiyang County. When war was about to break out, Liu Bei received news that Cao Cao was planning to attack Hanzhong Commandery after Zhang Lu fled to Baxi. (Note: (二十年，孫權以先主已得益州，使使報欲得荊州。先主言：「須得涼州，當以荊州相與。」權忿之，乃遣呂蒙襲奪長沙、零陵、桂陽三郡。先主引兵五萬下公安，令關羽入益陽。是歲，曹公定漢中，張魯遁走巴西。先主聞之，與權連和，分荊州、江夏、長沙、桂陽東屬，南郡、零陵、武陵西屬，引軍還江州。) Sanguozhi vol. 32.)

Liu Bei became worried about Cao Cao seizing Hanzhong Commandery. and requested for a border treaty with Sun Quan for the Jing province with Jiangxia, Changsha and Guiyang going to Sun Quan while Nan commandery, Lingling and Wuling would go back to Liu Bei, setting the new border along the Xiang River. Liu Bei led his army back to Ba commandery and had Huang Quan sent to lead troops to meet Zhang Lu, however he already had surrendered to Cao Cao. (Note: (遣黃權將兵迎張魯，張魯已降曹公。) Sanguozhi vol. 32.)

=== Hanzhong Campaign (217–219) ===
In 215, Cao Cao defeated Zhang Lu at the Battle of Yangping and seized Hanzhong Commandery. Sima Yi and Liu Ye advised him to take advantage of the victory to attack Yi Province, since it was still unstable under Liu Bei's new government and Liu Bei himself was away in Jing Province. Cao Cao, who was not fond of the terrain of the region, refused and left Xiahou Yuan, Zhang He and Xu Huang to defend Hanzhong Commandery.

In anticipation of a prolonged war, Zhang He led his army to Dangqu Commandery (宕渠郡; around present-day Qu County, Sichuan) in order to relocate the population of Ba Commandery (巴郡; present-day Chongqing and eastern Sichuan) to Hanzhong Commandery. Meanwhile, Liu Bei appointed Zhang Fei as the Administrator of Baxi Commandery (巴西郡) and ordered him to take over the region. Zhang Fei and Zhang He faced each other for 50 days, which concluded with a victory for the former following a surprise attack on the latter. Narrowly escaping, Zhang He retreated to Nanzheng County on foot, and the Ba region became part of Liu Bei's territory. (Note: (曹公使夏侯淵、張郃屯漢中，數數犯暴巴界。先主令張飛進兵宕渠，與郃等戰於瓦口，破郃等，收兵還南鄭。先主亦還成都。) Sanguozhi vol. 32.)

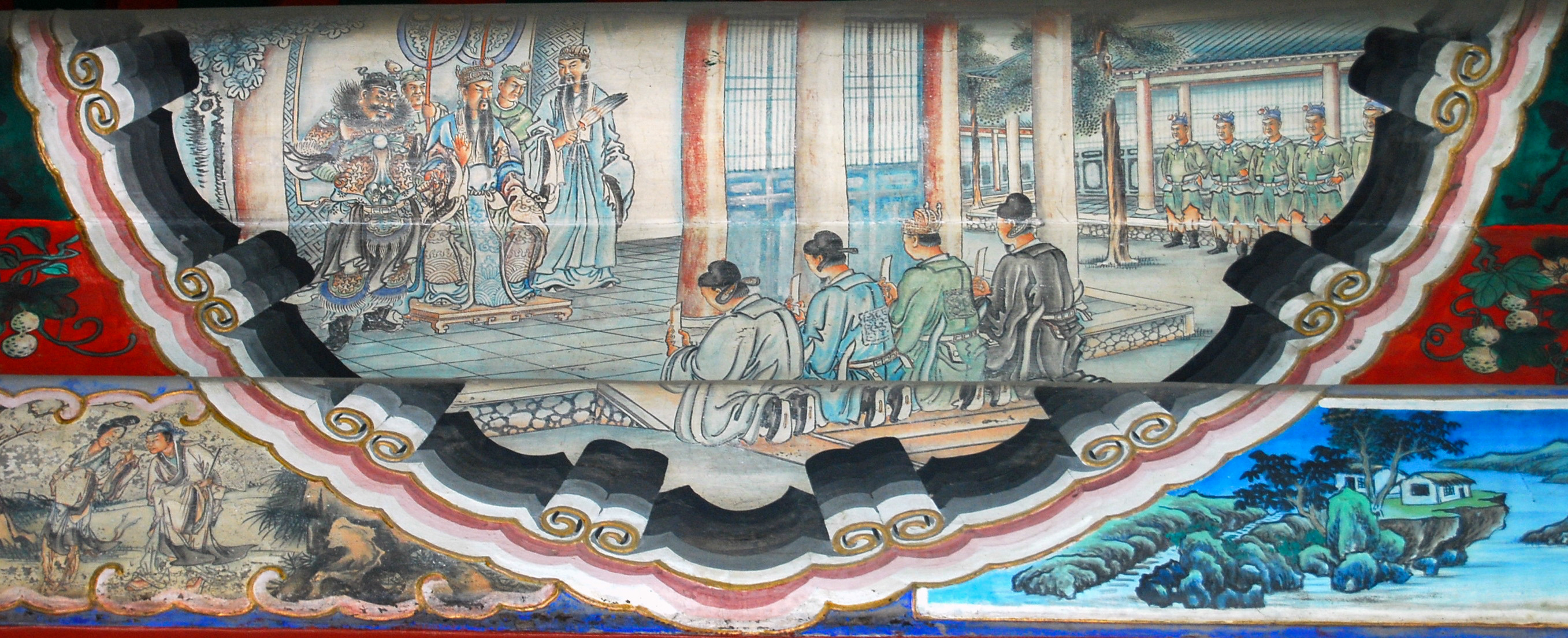
Liu Bei declares himself king, portrait at the Long Corridor of the Summer Palace, Beijing

In 217, Fa Zheng pointed out the strategic necessities of seizing Hanzhong Commandery and advised Liu Bei to drive Cao Cao's force out of the area. Liu Bei sent Zhang Fei, Ma Chao and others to capture Wudu Commandery (武都郡), while he assembled an army and advanced to Yangping Pass. Zhang Fei was forced to retreat after his aides Wu Lan (吳蘭) and Lei Tong (雷銅) were defeated and killed by Cao Cao's forces. Liu Bei, engaged Xiahou Yuan at Yangping Pass, tried to cut the enemy's supply route by sending his general Chen Shi to Mamingge (馬鳴閣), but was routed by Xiahou Yuan's subordinate, Xu Huang. Liu Bei then pressed on Zhang He at Guangshi (廣石) but failed to achieve any success; at the same time, Xiahou Yuan and Zhang He were not able to hinder Liu Bei from mobilising forces around the area. The war turned into a stalemate, and Cao Cao decided to gather an army in Chang'an to fight Liu Bei.

In the spring of 219, Liu Bei and Xiahou Yuan had faced each other for over a year. Liu Bei led the main army to the south of the Mian River (沔水) and ordered Huang Zhong to set up camps on Mount Dingjun, where Xiahou Yuan's encampment in the valley below could be easily monitored. One night, Liu Bei sent 10,000 troops to attack Zhang He in Guangshi and set fire to Xiahou Yuan's barricades. Xiahou Yuan then led a small detachment to put out the fire and sent the main army to reinforce Zhang He as he was overcome by Liu Bei. Fa Zheng saw an opportunity for attack and signalled to Liu Bei to launch an assault. Liu Bei sent Huang Zhong to attack the weakened enemy from above. Huang Zhong targeted Xiahou Yuan's unit and completely routed it. Both Xiahou Yuan and Zhao Yong, Cao Cao's appointed Inspector of Yi Province, were killed in the battle. (Note: (二十四年春，自陽平南渡沔水，緣山稍前，於定軍山勢作營。淵將兵來爭其地。先主命黃忠乘高鼓譟攻之，大破淵軍，斬淵及曹公所署益州刺史趙顒等。) Sanguozhi vol. 32.)

Zhang He, who had been informally elected to succeed Xiahou Yuan by Du Xi and Guo Huai, retreated to the northern bank of the Han River, and awaited Cao Cao's reinforcement from Chang'an. Liu Bei knew Cao Cao would come yet he knew he would hold Hanzhong. He secured all strategic points at the exit of the passes linking Chang'an and Hanzhong Commandery while Cao Cao was approaching via Xie Valley. Liu Bei faced Cao Cao for several months but never engaged the latter in battle, effectively forcing Cao to retreat as many of his soldiers started to desert. (Note: (及曹公至，先主斂眾拒險，終不交鋒，積月不拔，亡者日多。) Sanguozhi vol. 32.) Zhang He also retreated to Chencang County (陳倉縣; east of present-day Baoji, Shaanxi) to set up defences for a potential invasion by Liu Bei. Liu Bei led his main army to Nanzheng County and sent Meng Da and Liu Feng to capture Fangling (房陵) and Shangyong (上庸) commanderies from Shen Dan (申耽). (Note: (曹公自長安舉眾南征。先主遙策之曰：「曹公雖來，無能為也，我必有漢川矣。」及曹公至，先主斂眾拒險，終不交鋒，積月不拔，亡者日多。夏，曹公果引軍還，先主遂有漢中。遣劉封、孟達、李平等攻申耽於上庸。) Sanguozhi vol. 32.)

In 219, after Liu Bei conquered Hanzhong Commandery, his subjects urged him to declare himself a vassal king too to challenge Cao Cao, who was enfeoffed as a vassal king ("King of Wei") by Emperor Xian in 219. Liu Bei thus declared himself "King of Hanzhong" (漢中王) and set up his headquarters in Chengdu, the capital of Yi Province. (Note: (秋，群下上先主為漢中王，表於漢帝曰：平西將軍都亭侯臣馬超、左將軍（領）長史鎮軍將軍臣許靖、營司馬臣龐羲、議曹從事中郎軍議中郎將臣射援、) Sanguozhi vol. 32.) (Note: (《三輔決錄注》曰：援字文雄，扶風人也。其先本姓謝，與北地諸謝同族。始祖謝服為將軍出征，天子以謝服非令名，改為射，子孫氏焉。兄堅，字文固，少有美名，闢公府為黃門侍郎。獻帝之初，三輔飢亂，堅去官，與弟援南入蜀依劉璋，璋以堅為長史。劉備代璋，以堅為廣漢、蜀郡太守。援亦少有名行，太尉皇甫嵩賢其才而以女妻之，丞相諸葛亮以援為祭酒，遷從事中郎，卒官。軍師將軍臣諸葛亮、蕩寇將軍漢壽亭侯臣關羽、徵虜將軍新亭侯臣張飛、征西將軍臣黃忠、鎮遠將軍臣賴恭、揚武將軍臣法正、興業將軍臣李嚴等一百二十人上言曰：昔唐堯至聖而四凶在朝，周成仁賢而四國作難，高後稱製而諸呂竊命，孝昭幼衝而上官逆謀，皆馮世寵，藉履國權，窮凶極亂，社稷幾危。非大舜、周公、硃虛、博陸，則不能流放禽討，安危定傾。伏惟陛下誕姿聖德，統理萬邦，而遭厄運不造之艱。董卓首難，盪覆京畿，曹操階禍，竊執天衡；皇后太子，鴆殺見害，剝亂天下，殘毀民物。久令陛下蒙塵憂厄，幽處虛邑。人神無主，遏絕王命，厭昧皇極，欲盜神器。左將軍領司隸校尉豫、荊、益三州牧宜城亭侯備，受朝爵秩，念在輸力，以殉國難。睹其機兆，赫然憤發，與車騎將軍董承同謀誅操，將安國家，克寧舊都。會承機事不密，令操遊魂得遂長惡，殘泯海內。臣等每懼王室大有閻樂之禍，小有定安之變，夙夜惴惴，戰栗累息。昔在虞書，敦序九族，週監二代，封建同姓，詩著其義，歷載長久。漢興之初，割裂疆土，尊王子弟，是以卒折諸呂之難，而成太宗之基。臣等以備肺腑枝葉，宗子籓翰，心存國家，念在弭亂。自操破於漢中，海內英雄望風蟻附，而爵號不顯，九錫未加，非所以鎮衛社稷，光昭萬世也。奉辭在外，禮命斷絕。昔河西太守梁統等值漢中興，限於山河，位同權均，不能相率，咸推竇融以為元帥，卒立效績，摧破隗囂。今社稷之難，急於隴、蜀。操外吞天下，內殘群寮，朝廷有蕭牆之危，而禦侮未建，可為寒心。臣等輒依舊典，封備漢中王，拜大司馬，董齊六軍，糾合同盟，掃滅凶逆。以漢中、巴、蜀、廣漢、犍為為國，所署置依漢初諸侯王故典。夫權宜之製，苟利社稷，專之可也。然後功成事立，臣等退伏矯罪，雖死無恨。遂於沔陽設壇場，陳兵列眾，群臣陪位，讀奏訖，禦王冠於先主。先主上言漢帝曰：臣以具臣之才，荷上將之任，董督三軍，奉辭於外，不得掃除寇難，靖匡王室，久使陛下聖教陵遲，六合之內，否而未泰，惟憂反側，疢如疾首。曩者董卓造為亂階，自是之後，群凶縱橫，殘剝海內。賴陛下聖德威靈，人神同應，或忠義奮討，或上天降罰，暴逆並殪，以漸冰消。惟獨曹操，久未梟除，侵擅國權，恣心極亂。臣昔與車騎將軍董承圖謀討操，機事不密，承見陷害，臣播越失據，忠義不果。遂得使操窮凶極逆，主後戮殺，皇子鴆害。雖糾合同盟，念在奮力，懦弱不武，歷年未效。常恐殞沒，孤負國恩，寤寐永嘆，夕惕若厲。今臣群寮以為在昔虞書敦敘九族，庶明勵翼，五帝損益，此道不廢。週監二代，並建諸姬，實賴晉、鄭夾輔之福。高祖龍興，尊王子弟，大啟九國，卒斬諸呂，以安大宗。今操惡直醜正，寔繁有徒，包藏禍心，篡盜已顯。既宗室微弱，帝族無位，斟酌古式，依假權宜，上臣大司馬漢中王。臣伏自三省，受國厚恩，荷任一方，陳力未效，所獲已過，不宜復忝高位以重罪謗。群寮見逼，迫臣以義。臣退惟寇賊不梟，國難未已，宗廟傾危，社稷將墜，成臣憂責碎首之負。若應權通變，以寧靖聖朝，雖赴水火，所不得辭，敢慮常宜，以防後悔。輒順眾議，拜受印璽，以崇國威。仰惟爵號，位高寵厚，俯思報效，憂深責重，驚怖累息，如臨於谷。盡力輸誠，獎厲六師，率齊群義，應天順時，撲討凶逆，以寧社稷，以報萬分，謹拜章因驛上還所假左將軍、宜城亭侯印綬。) Sanfu Jue Lu Zhu annotation in Sanguozhi vol. 32.)

He designated his son Liu Shan as his heir apparent. Wei Yan was put in charge of Hanzhong Commandery. Xu Jing and Fa Zheng were respectively appointed as Grand Tutor and Prefect of the Masters of Writing in Liu Bei's vassal kingdom, while Guan Yu, Zhang Fei, Ma Chao and Huang Zhong were respectively appointed Generals of the Vanguard, Right, Left and Rear. (Note: (於是還治成都。拔魏延為都督，鎮漢中。) Sanguozhi vol. 32.) (Note: (《典略》曰：備於是起館舍，築亭障，從成都至白水關，四百餘區。) Dianlüe annotation in Sanguozhi vol. 32.)

=== Becoming an emperor (219–221) ===
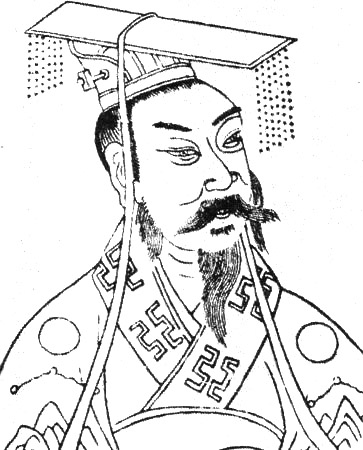
Portrait of Liu Bei from Sancai Tuhui

In early winter 219, Sun Quan's forces led by Lü Meng invaded Liu Bei's territories in Jing Province and captured and executed Guan Yu. (Note: (時關羽攻曹公將曹仁，禽于禁於樊。俄而孫權襲殺羽，取荊州。) Sanguozhi vol. 32.) After learning of Guan Yu's death and the loss of Jing Province, Liu Bei turned furious and ordered his troops to begin preparing for war with Sun Quan. In early 220, Cao Cao died and was succeeded by his son, Cao Pi. Later that year, Cao Pi usurped the throne from Emperor Xian, ended the Eastern Han dynasty and established the state of Cao Wei with himself as the emperor. With some reports saying that the Han Emperor had been killed, Liu Bei declared mourning and adopted mourning clothes. He gave the emperor the posthumous title of The Filial Commiserating Emperor (孝愍皇帝). (Note: (二十五年，魏文帝稱尊號，改年曰黃初。或傳聞漢帝見害，先主乃發喪制服，追諡曰孝愍皇帝。是後在所並言眾瑞，日月相屬，故議郎陽泉侯劉豹、青衣侯向舉、偏將軍張裔、黃權、大司馬屬殷純、益州別駕從事趙莋、治中從事楊洪、從事祭酒何宗、議曹從事杜瓊、勸學從事張爽、尹默、譙周等上言：臣聞河圖、洛書，五經讖、緯，孔子所甄，驗應自遠。謹案洛書甄曜度曰：『赤三日德昌，九世會備，合為帝際。』洛書寶號命曰：『天度帝道備稱皇，以統握契，百成不敗。』洛書錄運期曰：『九侯七傑爭命民炊骸，道路籍籍履人頭，誰使主者玄且來。』孝經鉤命決錄曰：『帝三建九會備。』臣父群未亡時，言西南數有黃氣，直立數丈，見來積年，時時有景雲祥風，從璿璣下來應之，此為異瑞。又二十二年中，數有氣如旗，從西竟東，中天而行，圖、書曰『必有天子出其方』。加是年太白、熒惑、填星，常從歲星相追。近漢初興，五星從歲星謀；歲星主義，漢位在西，義之上方，故漢法常以歲星候人主。當有聖主起於此州，以致中興。時許帝尚存，故群下不敢漏言。頃者熒惑復追歲星，見在胃昴畢；昴畢為天綱，經曰『帝星處之，眾邪消亡』。聖諱豫睹，推揆期驗，符合數至，若此非一。臣聞聖王先天而天不違，後天而奉天時，故應際而生，與神合契。原大王應天順民，速即洪業，以寧海內。) Sanguozhi vol. 32.)

Following the rumors of Emperor Xian's death, there were many favorable omens and soon more and more officials among Liu Bei's court advocated to have him declared Emperor, but Liu Bei refused. (Note: (所在並言眾瑞。故議郎陽泉亭侯劉豹，青衣侯向舉，偏將軍張裔、黃權，〔大〕司馬屬陰純，別駕趙莋，治中楊洪，從事祭酒何宗，議曹從事杜瓊，勸學從事張爽、尹默、「譙」周〔群〕等上〔言〕：「河洛符驗，孔子所甄。〔《洛書‧甄曜度》曰：〕赤三日，德昌九世，會備合為帝際。曰：天度帝道，備稱皇。」先主未許。) Huayang Guo Zhi vol. 6.)

After a dispute with Liu Feng and fearing that Liu Bei would hold him responsible for not reinforcing Guan Yu, Meng Da alongside many of his followers defected to Wei. Assisted by Xu Huang and Xiahou Shang, they conquered Fangling, Shangyong and Xicheng commanderies from Liu Bei's adopted son, Liu Feng. Upon his return to Chengdu, Liu Bei was furious with Liu Feng's loss and his refusal to send reinforcement to Guan Yu in 219. Upon Zhuge Liang's suggestion, Liu Bei had Liu Feng commit suicide. Liu Bei wept upon his death. (Note: (會羽覆敗，先主恨之。又封與達忿爭不和，封尋奪達鼔吹。達旣懼罪，又忿恚封，遂表辭先主，率所領降魏。... 諸葛亮慮封剛猛，易世之後終難制御，勸先主因此除之。於是賜封死，使自裁。封嘆曰：「恨不用孟子度之言！」先主為之流涕。) Sanguozhi vol. 40.)

In 221, Liu Bei declared himself emperor too and established the state of Shu Han; he claimed that his intention was to keep the Han dynasty's lineage alive. He changed the reign year and made Zhuge Liang his chancellor and Xu Jing his minister over the masses. He established a bureaucracy and an ancestral temple where he offered sacrifices to Emperor Gao (the founding emperor of the Han Dynasty). He designated Lady Wu as his empress and made his son Liu Shan crown prince. Later, he named his son Liu Yong prince of Lu and his other son Liu Li prince of Liang. (Note: (章武元年夏四月，大赦，改年。以諸葛亮為丞相，許靖為司徒。置百官，立宗廟，祫祭高皇帝以下。 五月，立皇后吳氏，子禪為皇太子。六月，以子永為魯王，理為梁王。) Sanguozhi vol. 32.)

== Defeat and death (221–223) ==
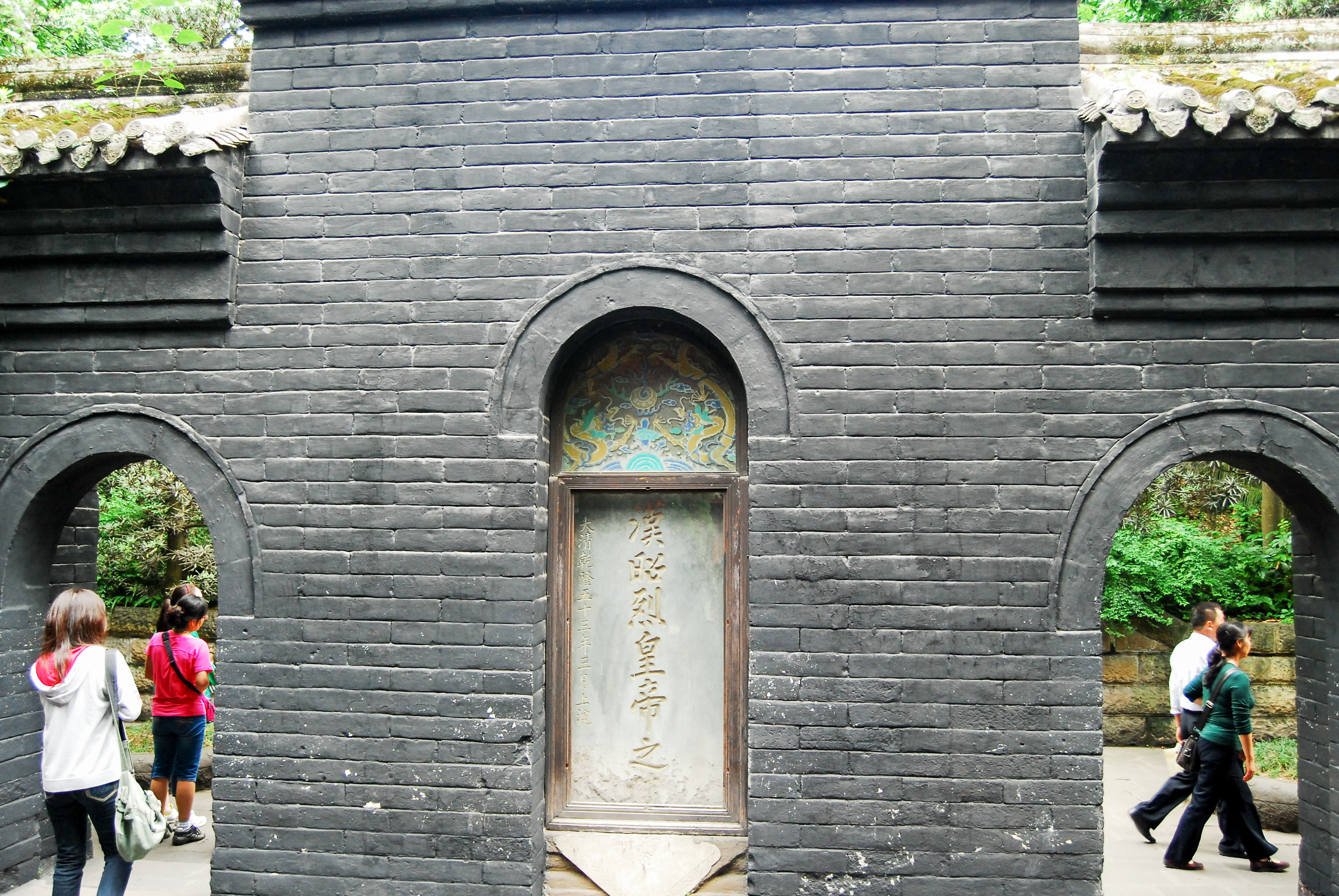
Tomb of Liu Bei

In the August 221, Liu Bei personally led an army to attack Sun Quan to avenge Guan Yu and retake his lost territories in Jing Province, while leaving Zhuge Liang in charge of state affairs in Chengdu. Sun Quan sent a letter seeking for peace, but Liu Bei refused. Even though Zhang Fei was murdered by his subordinates during the onset of the battle, Liu Bei was still able to achieve initial victories against the Sun commandants stationed at Wu and Zigui until Lu Xun, the frontline commander of Sun Quan's forces, ordered a retreat to Yiling. Lu Xun held his position there and refused to engage the invaders. (Note: (車騎將軍張飛為其左右所害。初，先主忿孫權之襲關羽，將東征，秋七月，遂帥諸軍伐吳。孫權遣書請和，先主盛怒不許，吳將陸議、李異、劉阿等屯巫、秭歸；將軍吳班、馮習自巫攻破異等，軍次秭歸，武陵五谿蠻夷遣使請兵。) Sanguozhi vol. 32.)

Knowing that his enemy was not expecting a sudden strike, Lu Xun ordered a counterattack and set fire to the Shu camps linked to each other by wooden fences. 40 camps of Liu Bei's expedition force were destroyed in the fire attack and the remaining troops were defeated and forced to flee west to Ma'an Hills (northwest of Yiling), where they set up a defence. Lu Xun caught up with and besieged Liu Bei there before his men could recuperate. Liu Bei managed to escape overnight to Baidicheng by ordering his men to discard their armour and set them aflame to form a fire blockade. Lu Xun was unable to overcome the blockade and did not press any further attack. Liu Bei retreated to Yufu County (魚復縣; present-day Fengjie County, Chongqing), which he renamed "Yong'an" (永安; literally "everlasting peace"). Eventually because of Cao Pi's invasion of Wu, Lu Xun and Liu Bei renewed their alliance. (Note: (二年春正月，先主軍還秭歸，將軍吳班、陳式水軍屯夷陵，夾江東西岸。二月，先主自秭歸率諸將進軍，緣山截嶺，於夷道猇亭駐營，自佷山通武陵，遣侍中馬良安慰五谿蠻夷，咸相率響應。鎮北將軍黃權督江北諸軍，與吳軍相拒於夷陵道。夏六月，黃氣見自秭歸十餘里中，廣數十丈。後十餘日，陸議大破先主軍於猇亭，將軍馮習、張南等皆沒。先主自猇亭還秭歸，收合離散兵，遂棄船舫，由步道還魚復，改魚復縣曰永安。吳遣將軍李異、劉阿等踵躡先主軍，屯駐南山。秋八月，收兵還巫。) Sanguozhi vol. 32.)

A few weeks before the decisive engagement between the Shu and Wu forces, there was an impressive yellow aura that manifested into the sky. Many saw this as an omen. After his defeat, Liu Bei lamented about this: "My defeat is Heaven's will!" (Note: (夏六月，黃氣見自「姊」〔秭〕歸十餘里中，廣十餘丈。後十數日，與吳人戰，先主敗績。馮習及將張南皆死。先主嘆曰：「吾之敗，天也！」委舟舫，由步道還魚復。) Huayang Guo Zhi vol. 6.)

Sun Quan heard that Liu Bei was in Baidi and sent an envoy for peace, Liu Bei accepted and had Zhong Wei (宗瑋) sent in response. When Huang Yuan (黃元), the administrator of Hanjia, heard that Liu Bei was ill, he rebelled because he feared that after his death, his bad relationship with Zhuge Liang would bring him problems. He was defeated by Cheng Hu (陳曶) and executed. (Note: (三年春二月，丞相亮自成都到永安。三月，黃元進兵攻臨邛縣。遣將軍陳曶討元，元軍敗，順流下江，為其親兵所縛，生致成都，斬之。) Sanguozhi vol. 32.) Liu Bei stayed in Baidicheng until his death from a serious illness on 10 June 223. On his deathbed, he named Zhuge Liang and Li Yan as regents to support Liu Shan and encouraged his sons to live well and do right. (Note: (三年春二月，丞相亮自成都到永安。三月，黃元進兵攻臨邛縣。遣將軍陳曶討元，元軍敗，順流下江，為其親兵所縛，生致成都，斬之。先主病篤，託孤於丞相亮，尚書令李嚴為副。夏四月癸巳，先主殂於永安宮，時年六十三。) Sanguozhi vol. 32.)

Liu Bei's posthumous decree to Liu Shan was as such:

"At first, my illness was only minor but it later evolved into other serious diseases. Those were more dangerous and couldn't be cured. If a man dies at fifty, it is not considered an early death. I am already past sixty. What is there further to regret? I'm not worried about me; but I'm worried about you and your brothers. When Master She came, he told me that the chancellor thought highly of you and saw you as a bright man exceeding his expectation. If he thinks so highly of you then I can leave. Be vigilant! Be vigilant! If an evil is minor, resist it nonetheless. If a good deed is trifling, perform it all the same. Only wisdom and virtue can truly win men's devotion. I was not a virtuous man; do not emulate me. You should study the Book of Han and the Book of Rites in your free time and read different philosophers such as the Six Secret Teachings and The Book of Lord Shang which elevate the soul. Then you can seek the worthies."

When he was near death, he told his son Liu Yong to treat with his brothers the chancellor as a father and do their utmost to help him. (Note: (諸葛亮集載先主遺詔敕後主曰：朕初疾但下痢耳，後轉雜他病，殆不自濟。人五十不稱夭，年已六十有餘，何所復恨，不復自傷，但以卿兄弟為念。射君到，說丞相嘆卿智量，甚大增脩，過於所望，審能如此，吾復何憂！勉之，勉之！勿以惡小而為之，勿以善小而不為。惟賢惟德，能服於人。汝父德薄，勿效之。可讀漢書、禮記，間暇歷觀諸子及六韜、商君書，益人意智。聞丞相為寫申、韓、管子、六韜一通已畢，未送，道亡，可自更求聞達。臨終時，呼魯王與語：「吾亡之後，汝兄弟父事丞相，令卿與丞相共事而已。」) Sanguozhi vol. 32.)

His body was brought back to Chengdu and entombed at Huiling (惠陵; southern suburb of present-day Chengdu) four months later. Liu Bei was given the posthumous name Zhaolie. Liu Shan succeeded him as the emperor of Shu Han, while Zhuge Liang later solidified peace with Sun Quan and rebuilt the old Sun–Liu alliance against Cao Pi formally. (Note: (五月，梓宮自永安還成都，諡曰昭烈皇帝。秋，八月，葬惠陵。) Sanguozhi vol. 32.)

== Appraisal ==
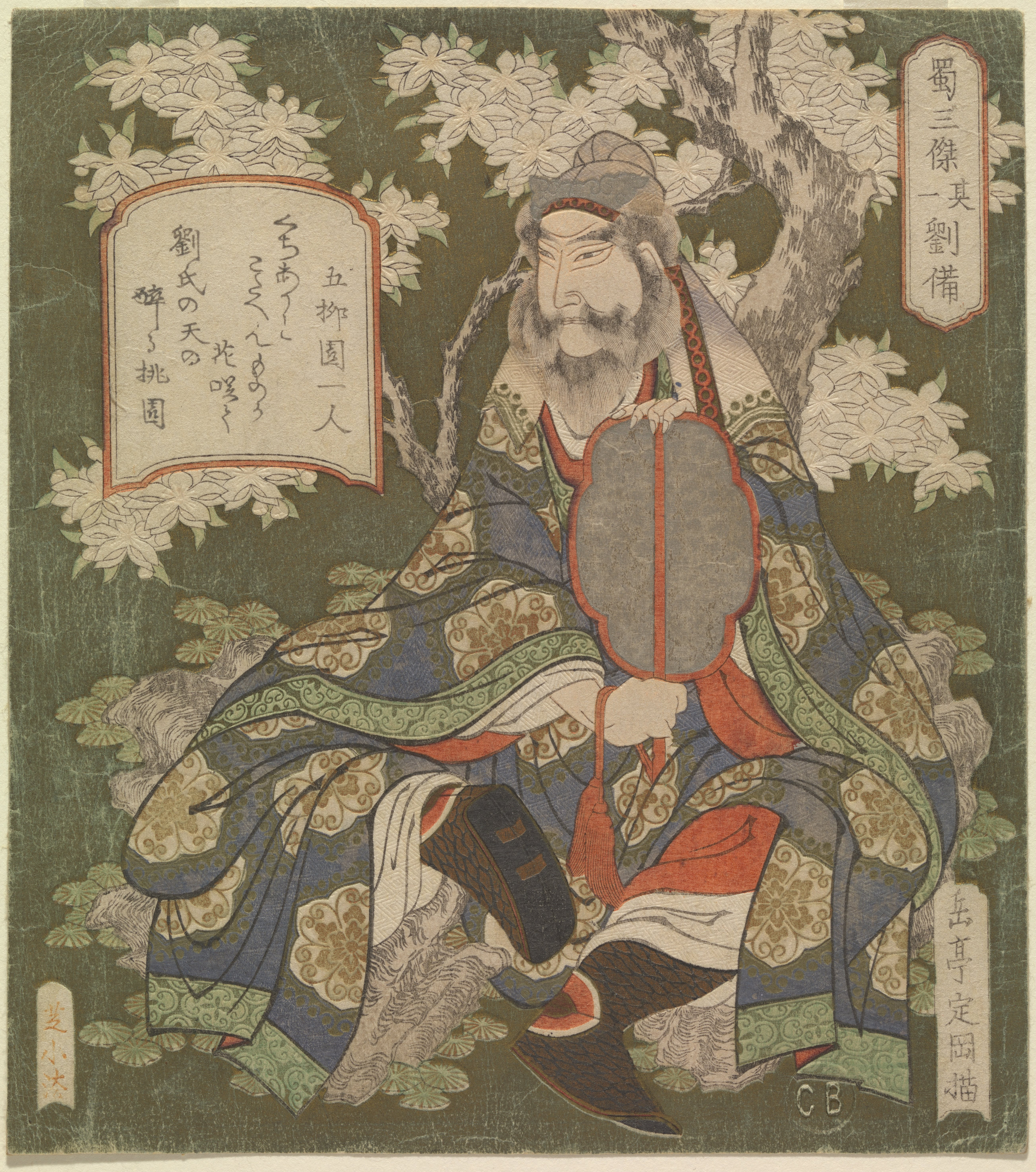
illustration of Liu Bei by Yashima Gakutei in the Chester Beatty Library

Chen Shou, once a subject of Shu and the historian who wrote Liu Bei's biography in the Records of the Three Kingdoms (Sanguozhi), appraised Liu Bei as follows:

From the Former Lord's magnanimity, determination, tolerance and generosity to his judgment of men and treatment of elites assuredly had the air of Emperor Gaozu (Liu Bang) and the aura of a hero about him. When he entrusted the state and his son to Zhuge Liang, his mind was without ambivalence. It was truly the ultimate of selflessness of a ruler and his minister, and it is an excellent model for all time.
Though he was able to respond to situations and was an able strategist, he could not match Emperor Wu of Wei (Cao Cao) and as a consequence his dominion was restricted. Though he might be broken, however he would not yield and in the end he could not be subjugated. Perhaps, he surmised that Cao Cao would be incapable of accepting him. He was not only competing for advantage but also simply sought thereby to avoid harm. (Note: (評曰：先主之弘毅寬厚，知人待士，蓋有高祖之風，英雄之器焉。及其舉國託孤於諸葛亮，而心神無貳，誠君臣之至公，古今之盛軌也。機權幹略，不逮魏武，是以基宇亦狹。然折而不撓，終不為下者，抑揆彼之量必不容己，非唯競利，且以避害雲爾。) Sanguozhi vol. 32.)

Chang Qu, historian and compiler of the Chronicles of Huayang in the fourth-century later used by Pei Songzhi in his annotations to the historical text Records of the Three Kingdoms also gave his appraisal of Liu Bei:

At the end of the Han dynasty, there was great chaos. Following this, many leaders arose. Among them were Dong Zhuo and Lü Bu. Yuan Shao and Yuan Shu. Han Sui and Ma Teng. Zhang Yang and Liu Biao. Alongside many others. All of them were put in charge of provinces and commanderies, they commanded armies numbering in the tens of thousands. They would claim that they were following in the footsteps of Gaozu and inspire themselves from the examples of Duke Huan of Qi and Duke Wen of Jin. Yet in the end, all of them were crushed and slaughtered by Emperor Wu of Wei, for he possessed divine martial valor and exceptional strategic thinking.

Looking at Liu Bei; he was a man of modest reputation and an obscure background however he was able to rise like a dragon and soar like a phoenix. He was a leader in Yu and a ruler in Xu. Later, he acquired the regions of Jing and Chu and would rise and ascend in the territory of Yi and Hanzhong. He inherited the legacy of the Han dynasty and split the land into three with Wu and Wei. Could such a man have enjoyed such successes if he did not possess heroic talents or enjoy Heaven's mandate?

However, when the Cao family replaced the Han dynasty. Liu Bei should have supported his faith in the fallen dynasty in order to demonstrate his intentions to all. When he claimed the title of King, it wasn't what the righteous should do. As Chen Shou commented, when he was near death. Liu Bei "entrusted the state and his son to Zhuge Liang without ambivalence". And Chen Shou thought that this relationship between a ruler and his minister is an excellent model for all time. (Note: (譔曰：漢末大亂，雄桀並起。若董卓、呂布、二袁、韓、馬、張楊、劉表之徒，兼州連郡，眾踰萬計，叱吒之間，皆自謂漢祖可踵，桓、文易邁；而魏武神武幹略，戡屠盪盡。於時先主名微人鮮，而能龍興鳳舉，伯豫、君徐，假翼荊楚，翻飛梁益之地，克胤漢祚，而〔與〕吳、魏「與之」鼎峙。非英才命世，孰克如之。然，必以曹氏替漢，宜扶信順以明至公。還乎名號，為義士所非。及其寄死，託孤於諸葛亮而心神無貳。陳子以為君臣之至公，古今之盛軌也。) Huayang Guo Zhi vol. 6.)

However, the opinions of modern historians are more negative. As Rafe de Crespigny writes in Fire over Luoyang: A History of the Later Han Dynasty 23–220 AD:

Liu Bei must be one of the most over-rated heroes in history. During the early years of the civil war, he suffered several defeats in operations on the North China plain before surrendering to Cao Cao. Though treated generously, he joined an assassination plot and fled to Yuan Shao when it was discovered. Following Yuan Shao's defeat, Liu Bei took refuge with Liu Biao, and as Cao Cao approached in 208 he fled once more to the south.

Despite romantic legend, the subsequent victory at the Red Cliffs was largely the achievement of Sun Quan's troops led by Zhou Yu, but Liu Bei took advantage of the success to occupy the greater part of Jing province south of the Yangzi. He later took Yi province from Liu Zhang and was successful at Dingjun Mountain. After his officer Guan Yu was surprised by Sun Quan's general Lü Meng in 219, Liu Bei launched a revenge attack down the Yangzi to regain Jing province, but suffered a humiliating defeat in 222 and died soon afterwards

It was a picaresque career, and extraordinarily successful for a man of humble background, but Liu Bei was never much more than a soldier of remarkably good fortune.

Rafe de Crespigny also gave a more neutral appraisal of Liu Bei in A Biographical Dictionary of Later Han to the Three Kingdoms (23–220 AD):

Liu Bei was a typical condottiere, primarily concerned with the loyalty of his followers and showing limited interest in a long-term stable future. (Note: A perceptive comment by Pei Qian (father of Pei Xiu) was recorded in A New Account of the Tales of the World; Mather 76:196–197]. This comment was also recorded in Pei's biography in vol.23 of Records of the Three Kingdoms.) He was remarkably successful, for he was an effective fighting general and had several good advisers and officers, but the basics of his survival and that of his state was his isolation in the west and the fortunate series of chances which had led him there. From his earliest days, Liu Bei had changed his coat and his allegiance at any time it seemed to suit, and his take-over of Yi Province was a betrayal of the kinsman who had sought his aid. It is not inappropriate that the destruction of his wider ambitions came through an even greater and quite unexpected act of treachery and trickery by his ally Sun Quan.
However, behind the ostensible realities of history and the exaggerations of the romance, we may perceive a man who could inspire great loyalty and admiration, and whose recovery from repeated set-backs – in an age when defeat so frequently brought death – reflects personal qualities and a presence which can no longer be properly reconstructed. From humble background with an erratic record, Liu Bei was a man of remarkable character: certainly courageous, surely un-trustworthy to superiors and rivals, but clearly loyal to his subordinates; in many respects an ideal hero for an age of individuals.

== Family ==
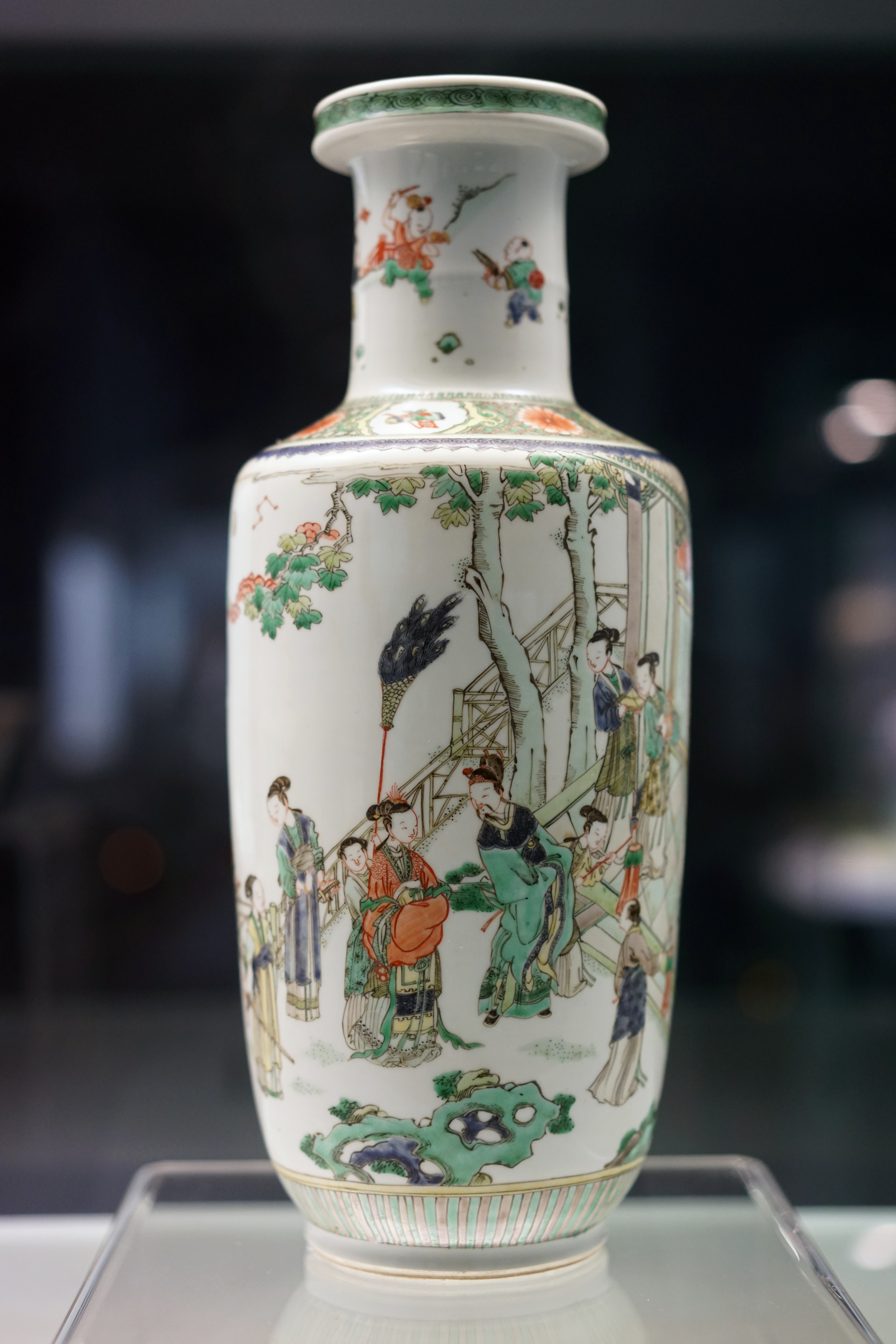
Famille verte vase with design of Liu Bei's marriage story, Qing dynasty.

- Empress Zhaolie, of the Gan clan (昭烈皇后甘氏; d.210)
  - Liu Shan, Emperor Huai (漢懷帝劉禪; 207–271), first son
- Empress Mu, of the Wu clan (穆皇后吳氏; d.245)
- Furen Mi, of the Mi clan (麋夫人)
- Furen Sun, of the Sun clan (孫夫人), daughter of Sun Jian
- Unknown:
  - Liu Yong, Prince of Ganling (甘陵王)
  - Liu Li, Prince of Anping (安平王)
  - at least two daughters , captured by Cao Chun when Battle of Changban

== In Romance of the Three Kingdoms ==
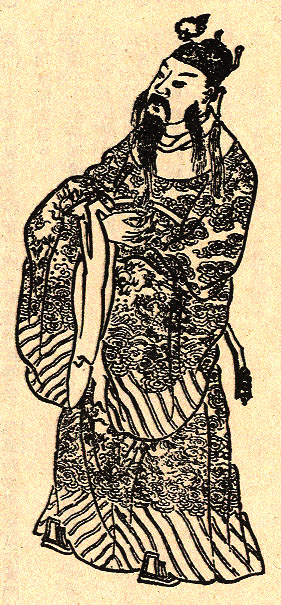
A block print portrait of Liu Bei from a Qing dynasty edition of the historical novel Romance of the Three Kingdoms (wearing an anachronistic scholar's robe and a hat of mediaeval Chinese dynasties).

Romance of the Three Kingdoms is a 14th-century historical novel which romanticises the historical figures and events before and during the Three Kingdoms period of China. Written by Luo Guanzhong more than 1,000 years after the Three Kingdoms period, the novel incorporates many popular folklore and opera scripts into the character of Liu Bei, portraying him as a benevolent and righteous leader, endowed with charismatic potency (called de 德 in Chinese) who builds his state on the basis of Confucian values. This is in line with the historical background of the times during which the novel was written. Furthermore, the novel emphasises that Liu Bei was related, however distantly, to the imperial family of the Han dynasty, thus favouring another argument for the legitimacy of Liu Bei's reign.

Romance of the Three Kingdoms gives additional features Liu Bei's physical appearance. It mentions that Liu Bei is seven chi and five cun tall, with ears so large that they touch his shoulders and that he can even see them, long arms that extend beyond his knees, a fair and jade like face, and lips so red that it seems as though he is wearing lipstick. He wields a pair of double edged swords called shuang gu jian (雙股劍).

See the following for some fictitious stories in Romance of the Three Kingdoms involving Liu Bei:

- Oath of the Peach Garden
- Battle of Hulao Pass
- The Three Visits to the Thatched Cottage
- List of fictitious stories in Romance of the Three Kingdoms § Liu Bei's horse leaps across the Tan Stream
- List of fictitious stories in Romance of the Three Kingdoms § Liu Bei and Lady Sun's marriage
- Battle of Xiaoting § In fiction

== General worship of Liu Bei ==
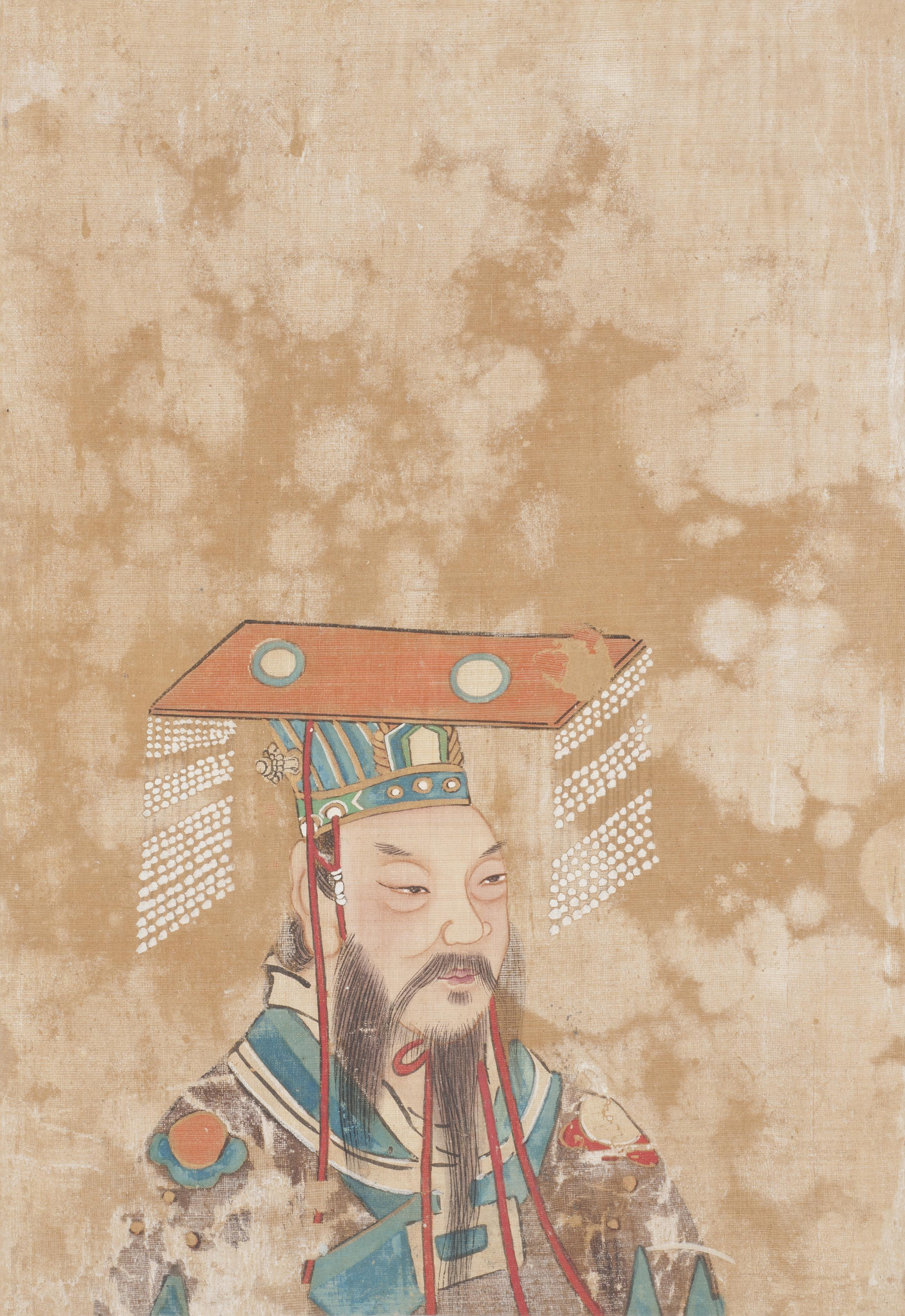
As depicted in the album Portraits of Famous Men c. 1900, housed in the Philadelphia Museum of Art

Liu Bei is worshipped as the patron of shoemakers in Chengdu. It is said that in 1845, during the reign of the Daoguang Emperor in the Qing dynasty, the shoemakers guild in Chengdu, who called themselves "disciples of Liu Bei", sponsored the construction of the Sanyi Temple in Liu Bei's honour. After being relocated many times, the temple can be found in Wuhou District today.

Since the Chinese government loosened its control on religious practices in recent years, the worship of Liu Bei among shoemakers has again gained popularity in Chengdu. In 2005, a large procession was carried out in front of the Sanyi Temple to commemorate Liu Bei – the first such event since the founding of the People's Republic of China in 1949.

A commentary carried by the Yangtse Evening Post criticised such practice as mere commercial gimmickry to exploit the fame of Liu Bei. It argued that although Liu Bei sold straw-woven shoes and mats for a living when he was young, he was hardly the inventor of shoes. According to legend, it was Yu Ze who made the first pairs of shoes with softwood during the time of the Yellow Emperor. However, the criticism did not dampen the enthusiastic shoe industry owners in their decision to erect a statue of Liu Bei in the West China Shoe Center Industrial Zone, which was still under construction in Wuhou District as of August 2005.

== In popular culture ==
=== Film and television ===
Notable actors who have portrayed Liu Bei in films and television series include: Sun Yanjun in Romance of the Three Kingdoms (1994); Chang Fu-chien in Guan Gong (1996); Elliot Ngok in Three Kingdoms: Resurrection of the Dragon (2008); You Yong in Red Cliff (2008–09); Yu Hewei in Three Kingdoms (2010); Alex Fong in The Lost Bladesman (2011); Yan Yikuan in God of War, Zhao Yun (2016); Tony Yang in Dynasty Warriors (2019).

=== Card games ===
In the collectible card game Magic: The Gathering there is a card named "Liu Bei, Lord of Shu" in the Portal Three Kingdoms set. In the selection of hero cards in the Chinese card game San Guo Sha, there is also a "Liu Bei" card that players can select at the beginning of the game. In the Roll-and-write game Shu's Tactics, a hero named Liu Bei appears in chapter 3.

=== Video games ===
Liu Bei is featured as a playable character in all instalments of Koei's video game series Dynasty Warriors, as well as Warriors Orochi, a crossover between Dynasty Warriors and Samurai Warriors. He also appears in other Koei video game series such as the Romance of the Three Kingdoms series and Kessen II.

Liu Bei is the protagonist in Destiny of an Emperor, a RPG on the Nintendo Entertainment System (NES). Released in the United States by Capcom in 1989, the game also loosely follows the plot of the novel Romance of the Three Kingdoms.

Liu Bei's armour (based on the designs appearing in the Dynasty Warriors series) is available in the MMORPG MapleStory. Also featured are Cao Cao, Guan Yu, Zhuge Liang, Sun Quan, and Diaochan's designs.

Liu Bei is featured in the sequel to Level-5's game and anime Inazuma Eleven GO, Chrono Stone, as well as Cao Cao, Zhuge Liang, Guan Yu and Zhang Fei.

He is also featured as one of the available warlords that the player can choose from in Creative Assembly's game Total War: Three Kingdoms, along with the Netflix game Reigns: Three Kingdoms.

== See also ==
- Lists of people of the Three Kingdoms
- List of Chinese monarchs

== Notes ==
Emperor Zhaolie of Shu Han House of Liu Born: 161 Died: 10 June 223
Regnal titles
New title	King of Hanzhong; 218–221	Merged in the Crown
Preceded by Emperor Xian of Han as Emperor of Eastern Han	Emperor of Shu Han; 221–223	Succeeded by Liu Shan
Titles in pretence
Preceded by Emperor Xian of Han	— TITULAR — Emperor of China; Royal descent claimant 221–223; Reason for succession failure: Three Kingdoms	Succeeded by Liu Shan
