= List of people of the Three Kingdoms (L) =

The following is a partial list of people significant to the Three Kingdoms period (220–280) of Chinese history. Their romanised names start with the letter L.

== L ==
Name	Courtesy name	Birth year	Death year	Ancestral home (present-day location)	Role	Allegiance	Previous allegiance(s)	Notes
Lai Gong 賴恭				Jingzhou, Lingling (Lingling District, Hunan)	Politician, general	Shu Han	Liu Biao	
Lai Min 來敏	Jingda 敬達			Xinye, Yiyang (Xinye County, Henan)	Advisor, politician	Shu Han	Liu Zhang	Sanguozhi vol. 42.
Lai Xiong 賴雄/賴厷				Jingzhou, Lingling (Lingling District, Hunan)	Politician	Shu Han		
Lai Yan 來艷	Jide 季德			Xinye (Xinye County, Henan)	Scholar, politician	Han dynasty		
Lai Zhong 來忠				Xinye, Yiyang (Xinye County, Henan)	General	Shu Han		
Lang Cen 狼岑				Dingji, Yuexi (Yanyuan County, Sichuan)	Tribal leader			
Lang Lu 狼路					Tribal leader	Shu Han, Qiang		
Lang Zhi 郎稚				Yuhang, Wu County (Hangzhou, Zhejiang)	Rebel leader			
Lao Jing 勞精					Politician	Cao Wei		
Lei Ding 雷定					Warlord			
Lei Tan 雷譚					General	Eastern Wu		
Lei Tong 雷銅			218		General	Liu Bei	Liu Zhang	
Lei Xu 雷緒		172	213	Lujiang (Southwest of Lujiang County, Anhui)	General, bandit	Liu Bei	Yuan Shu, Cao Cao	Lei Bo in novel.
Leng Bao 泠苞					General	Shu Han	Liu Zhang	Ling Bao in novel.
Li Bing 李秉	Xuanzhou 玄胄			Pingchun, Jiangxia, Jingzhou (Xinyang, Henan)	Politician	Cao Wei		
Li Boren 李伯仁						Shu Han		
Li Chao 李朝	Weinan 偉南		222	Qi County, Guanghan (Santai County, Sichuan)	Politician	Shu Han		
Li Cheng 栗成					General	Yuan Shao		
Li Cheng 李成						Han dynasty		
Li Chong 李重	Maozeng 茂曾	253	300	Pingchun, Jiangxia, Jingzhou (Xinyang, Henan)	Politician	Jin dynasty		
Li Chong 李崇					Politician	Eastern Wu		
Li Damu 李大目					Rebel leader	Zhang Yan		
Li Di 李覿				Wen County, Henei (Wen County, Henan)				
Li Dian 李典	Mancheng 曼成			Juye, Shanyang (Juye County, Shandong)	General	Cao Cao		Sanguozhi vol. 18.
Li Ding 李定				Zhuo County, Zhuo (Zhuozhou, Hebei)	Diviner			
Li Feng 李豐	Anguo 安國		254	Dong County, Pingyi (Dali County, Shaanxi)	Politician	Cao Wei		Sanguozhi vol. 9.
Li Feng 李豐				Nanyang (Nanyang, Henan)	General	Shu Han		Sanguozhi vol. 40.
Li Feng 李豐			197		General	Yuan Shu		
Li Feng 李封					General	Lü Bu		
Li Fu 李福	Sunde 孫德		238	Fu, Zitong (East of Mianyang, Sichuan)	Politician	Shu Han		
Li Fu 李孚	Zixian 子憲	162	210	Julu (Pingxiang County, Hebei)	Politician	Cao Cao	Yuan Shang, Yuan Tan	
Li Fu 李輔					General	Cao Wei		
Li Fu 李輔					General	Cao Wei		
Li Fu 李伏					General	Cao Wei	Zhang Lu	
Li Fu 李服			200		General	Han dynasty		
Li Gao 李高				Xichong County (Xichong County, Sichuan)	General	Jin dynasty		
Li Gu 李固					General	Han dynasty		
Li Guang 李光				Jianwei County, Wuyang (Pengshan County, Sichuan)	Politician	Han dynasty		
Li Guang 李光					General	Eastern Wu		
Li He/Li Shu 李合/李庶	Shujiang 庶姜			Wudu, Wuyuan (Ordos City, Inner Mongolia)	Fangshi			
Li Heng 李衡	Shuping 叔平			Xiangyang (Xiangyang, Hubei)	Politician	Eastern Wu		
Li Hong 李鴻						Shu Han	Cao Wei	
Li Hu 李虎				Lüeyang (Tianshui, Gansu)	Politician	Cao Wei	Shu Han	
Li Hua 李華					Palace maid	Cao Wei		
Li Huan 李桓			236	Luling (Ji'an, Jiangxi)	Rebel leader			
Li Hui 李恢	De'ang 德昂		231	Yuyuan, Jianning (Chengjiang County, Yunnan)	General, politician	Shu Han	Liu Zhang	Sanguozhi vol. 43.
Li Hui 李惠					Politician	Cao Wei		
Li Ji 李基				Pingchun County, Jiangxia (Xinyang, Henan)	General	Cao Wei		
Li Jian 李簡					General	Shu Han	Cao Wei	
Li Jin 李進				Chengshi, Jiyin (Juye County, Shandong)	General	Han dynasty		
Li Jue 李傕	Zhiran 稚然		198	Beidi (Fuping County, Shaanxi)	General, politician, warlord	Li Jue	Dong Zhuo	Houhanshu vol. 9, 71, 72; Sanguozhi vol. 6.
Li Jun 李俊				Wudu (Cheng County, Gansu)	General	Cao Wei		
Li Kan 李堪			211	Hedong (in Shanxi)	General	Guanzhong coalition		Sanguozhi vol. 1, 36.
Li Kang 李康	Xiaoyuan 蕭遠	196	264	Zhongshanguo (Dingzhou, Hebei)	Writer, politician	Cao Wei		
Li Le 李樂		160	196		Bandit leader, general	Han dynasty	Yellow Turban rebels	Li Yue in novel.
Li Li 李歷					Politician	Han Fu		
Li Li 李利				Beidi (Wuzhong, Ningxia)		Dong Zhuo		
Li Li 李立	Jianxian 建賢			Zhuo County (Zhuozhou, Hebei)	Politician	Cao Cao		
Li Meng 李蒙			192		General	Li Jue	Dong Zhuo	
Li Mi 李密	Lingbo 令伯	224	287	Jianwei County, Wuyang (Pengshan County, Sichuan)	Politician	Jin dynasty	Shu Han	Huayang Guo Zhi vol. 11. 09.
Li Miao 李邈	Han'nan 漢南		234	Qi County, Guanghan (Santai County, Sichuan)	Politician	Shu Han	Liu Zhang	
Li Min 李敏				Liaodong (Liaoyang, Liaoning)	Politician	Han dynasty		
Li Mu 李慕				Lüeyang (Tianshui, Gansu)	Politician	Cao Wei		
Li Qian 李乾				Juye, Shanyang (Juye County, Shandong)	General	Cao Cao		
Li Qiu 李球			263	Yuyuan (Chengjiang County, Yunnan)	General	Shu Han		
Li Qiucheng 李求承			225	Western Yunnan	Local leader			Sanguozhi vol. 43.
Li Quan 李權	Boyu 伯豫				Local leader	Han dynasty		Houhanshu vol. 10.
Li Ren 李仁					Politician	Eastern Wu		
Li Ren 李仁	Dexian 德賢			Zitongfu (Mianyang, Sichuan)		Han dynasty		
Li Ru 李儒	Wenyou 文優			Heyang, Pingyi	Advisor, politician	Dong Zhuo		Houhanshu vol. 10.
Li Ruo 李若					Politician	Cao Wei		
Li Shao 李邵				Jiajuyewang (Qinyang, Henan)	Politician	Yuan Shao	Han dynasty	
Li Shao 李邵	Yongnan 永南		225	Qi County, Guanghan (Santai County, Sichuan)	Politician	Shu Han		
Li Shao 李韶						Cao Wei	Shu Han	
Li Shencheng 李申成						Cao Cao		
Li Sheng 李勝	Gongzhao 公昭		249	Nanyang (Nanyang, Henan)	Politician	Cao Wei		Weilue annotation in Sanguozhi vol. 9.
Li Sheng 李盛			228		General	Shu Han		
Li Sheng 李升			188		General	Han dynasty		
Li Shi 李式				Beidi (Fuping County, Shaanxi)		Li Jue		
Li Shu 李術				Runan (Pingyu County, Henan)	General	Han dynasty		
Li Shucai 李淑才						Han dynasty		
Li Shuo 李朔				Changyi, Shanyang (Jinxiang County, Shandong)	Local leader	Han dynasty		
Li Song 栗嵩			189		Eunuch	Han dynasty		
Li Su 李肅			192	Wuyuan (Northwest of Baotou, Inner Mongolia)	General	Lü Bu	Dong Zhuo	
Li Su 李肅	Weigong 偉恭			Nanyang County (Nanyang, Henan)	Politician	Eastern Wu		
Li Tan 李覃				Anpingguo (Jizhou, Hebei)	Politician	Han dynasty		
Li Tao 黎韜				Langzhong, Baxi (Langzhong, Sichuan)	Politician	Shu Han		
Li Tao 李韜			254	Fengyi (Weinan, Dali County, Shaanxi)		Cao Wei		
Li Tiao 李條					Rebel leader			
Li Tong 李通	Wenda 文達	168	209	Pingchun County, Jiangxia (Xinyang, Henan)	General	Cao Cao		Sanguozhi vol. 18.
Li Tong 李通					Politician	Shu Han		
Li Wei 李偉				Fengyi (Dali County, Shaanxi)	Politician	Cao Wei		
Li Wenhou 李文侯			186		Tribal leader	Qiang		
Li Xi 李憙	Jihe 季和			Tongdi, Shangdang (Qin County, Shanxi)	General, politician	Jin dynasty	Cao Wei	Jin Shu vol. 41.
Li Xian 李暹			197	Beidi (Wuzhong, Ningxia)	General	Li Jue	Dong Zhuo	Sanguozhi vol. 6.
Li Xiang 李驤	Shulong 叔龍			Fu, Zitong (East of Mianyang, Sichuan)		Jin dynasty	Shu Han	Huayang Guo Zhi vol. 11.
Li Xiangru 李相如					Rebel leader, general		Han dynasty	
Li Xin 李歆					General	Cao Wei	Shu Han	
Li Xing 李興					General	Cao Wei		
Li Xiu 李休	Zilang 子郎			Nanyang (Nanyang, Henan)	Politician	Cao Wei	Zhang Lu	
Li Xu 李勖			270		General	Eastern Wu		
Li Xu 李緒					General	Cao Wei		
Li Yan 李嚴	Zhengfang 正方		234	Nanyang (Nanyang, Henan)	General, politician	Shu Han	Liu Biao, Liu Zhang	Sanguozhi vol. 40.
Li Yan 李延					Politician	Han dynasty		
Li Yan 李延					Politician	Yuan Shao		
Li Ye 李業	Juyou 巨游				Advisor	Yuan Shu	Han dynasty	
Li Yi 李異				Bahan	General	Sun Quan	Liu Zhang	
Li Yi 李翼			254	Fengyi (Weinan, Dali County, Shaanxi)	Politician	Cao Wei		
Li Yi 李義	Xiaoyi 孝懿			Fengyi (Weinan, Dali County, Shaanxi)	Politician	Cao Wei	Han dynasty	
Li Yi 李遺				Yuyuan, Jianning (Chengjiang County, Yunnan)	Politician	Shu Han		
Li Yi 李毅	Yungang 允剛		306	Guanghanqi (Zhongjiang County, Sichuan)	General	Jin dynasty		
Li Yin 李胤	Xuanbo 宣伯		282	Xiangping, Liaodong (Liaoyang, Liaoning)	General, politician	Jin dynasty	Cao Wei	Jin Shu vol. 44.
Li Ying 李膺					Politician	Cao Wei		
Li Ying 李應					Politician	Dong Zhuo		
Li Yiqi 李意期					Fangshi			He is listed in the Shenxian Zhuan. Li Yi in novel.
Li Yizi 李移子					Merchant			
Li Yong 李永				Suiyang (Shangqiu, Henan)	Politician	Han dynasty		
Li Yu 李玉			213	Yuzhang County (Nanchang, Jiangxi)	Rebel leader			
Li Yun 李允				Jiangxia (Ezhou, Hubei)	General	Eastern Wu		
Li Zhao 李昭					General	Cao Wei		
Li Zhaoyi 李昭儀			264		Noblewoman	Shu Han		
Li Zhen 李禎				Beidi (Fuping County, Shaanxi)	Politician	Han dynasty		
Li Zhen 李禎				Juye, Shanyang (Juye County, Shandong)	Politician	Cao Wei		
Li Zheng 李整				Juye, Shanyang (Juye County, Shandong)	General	Cao Cao		
Li Zhuan 李譔	Qinzhong 欽仲		261	Fu, Zitong (East of Mianyang, Sichuan)	Politician	Shu Han		Sanguozhi vol. 42.
Li Zou 李鄒					General	Cao Cao	Lü Bu	
Li Zuo 李祚					General	Jin dynasty		
Lian Zhao 廉昭				Anle, Yuyang (Beijing)	Politician	Cao Wei		
Liang Da/Tai 梁大/太					General	Liu Bei		
Liang Gang 梁綱			197		General	Yuan Shu		Sanguozhi vol. 1.
Liang Guang 梁廣					Writer	Eastern Wu		
Liang Hong 梁宏				Juzhang, Kuaiji (Ningbo, Zhejiang)	Politician	Han dynasty		
Liang Hu 梁鵠	Menghuang 孟皇			Anding County (Zhenyuan, Gansu)	Calligrapher, politician	Cao Cao	Liu Biao	
Liang Ji 梁冀	Bozhuo 伯卓	88	159		General, politician	Han dynasty		Houhanshu vol. 34.
Liang Ji 梁幾					General	Cao Wei		梁畿 in novel.
Liang Kuan 梁寬					General	Cao Wei		
Liang Mao 涼茂	Bofang 伯方			Changyi, Shanyang (Juye County, Shandong)	Politician	Cao Wei		Sanguozhi vol. 11.
Liang Qi 梁岐					General	Cao Cao	Yuan Shang	
Liang Qi 梁奇					Bandit leader			
Liang Qian 梁虔				Ji County, Tianshui, Liangzhou (Gangu, Gansu	General	Shu Han	Cao Wei	
Liang Shao 梁紹					Politician	Han dynasty		
Liang Shi 梁施				Zhe, Chen (Zhecheng County, Henan)	Politician	Cao Wei		
Liang Shuang 梁雙				Hanyang County (Tianshui, Gansu)	General	Han dynasty		
Liang Xi 梁習	Ziyu 子虞		230	Zhe, Chen (Zhecheng County, Henan)	General, politician	Cao Wei		Sanguozhi vol. 15.
Liang Xing 梁興			212	Pingyi (in Shaanxi)	General	Guanzhong coalition		Sanguozhi vol. 1, 36.
Liang Xu 梁緒				Ji County, Tianshui (Southeast of Gangu County, Gansu)	Politician	Shu Han	Cao Wei	Sanguozhi vol. 44.
Liang Xuan 梁宣	Kongda 孔達				Calligrapher	Han dynasty		
Liang Yu 梁寓	Kongru 孔儒			Wu County (Suzhou, Jiangsu)	General	Eastern Wu		
Liang Yuanbi 梁元碧					Tribal leader			
Liao Hua 廖化	Yuanjian 元儉		264	Zhonglu, Xiangyang (Xiangyang, Hubei)	General	Shu Han		Sanguozhi vol. 45.
Liao Li 廖立	Gongyuan 公淵			Linyuan, Wuling (Changde, Hunan)	Politician	Shu Han		Sanguozhi vol. 40.
Liao Qian 廖潛					Rebel leader, general		Eastern Wu	
Liao Shi 廖式					Rebel leader, general		Eastern Wu	
Lin Dai 鄰戴				Jiuquan (Jiuquan, Gansu)	Rebel leader	Qiang		
Lin Xun 林恂			255		General	Eastern Wu		
Ling Cao 凌操			203	Yuhang, Wu (Yuhang District, Zhejiang)	General	Sun Quan		Sanguozhi vol. 55.
Ling Feng 凌封				Yuhang, Wu (Yuhang District, Zhejiang)	General	Eastern Wu		Sanguozhi vol. 55.
Ling Lie 凌烈				Yuhang, Wu (Yuhang District, Zhejiang)	General	Eastern Wu		Sanguozhi vol. 55.
Ling Tong 凌統	Gongji 公績	189	217 / 237	Yuhang, Wu (Yuhang District, Zhejiang)	General	Sun Quan		Sanguozhi vol. 55.
Ling Zheng 冷徵			184		General	Han dynasty		
Linghu Hua 令狐華				Taiyuan (Taiyuan, Shanxi)	Politician	Cao Wei		
Linghu Jing 令狐景					Advisor, politician	Cao Wei		
Linghu Shao 令狐邵	Kongshu 孔叔			Taiyuan (Taiyuan, Shanxi)	General, politician	Cao Wei		
Linghu Yu 令狐愚	Gongzhi 公治		249		General	Cao Wei		Sanguozhi vol. 28.
Lady Liu 劉氏						Yuan Shao		
Lady Liu 劉氏					Cao Shuang's wife	Cao Wei		
Lady Liu 劉氏				Zhuo County, Zhuo (Zhuozhou, Hebei)	Noble lady, Zhuge Zhan's wife	Shu Han		
Liu A 劉阿					General	Eastern Wu		
Liu Ai 劉艾					Politician	Han dynasty		
Liu Ba 劉巴	Zichu 子初	186	222	Zhengyang, Lingling (Shaodong County, Hunan)	Advisor, politician	Shu Han	Cao Cao, Liu Zhang	Sanguozhi vol. 39.
Liu Ba 劉巴					General	Shu Han		
Liu Ban 劉班					Politician	Han dynasty		
Liu Bao 劉豹		181			Tribal leader	Xiongnu		Sanguozhi vol. 30.
Liu Bao 劉豹					Advisor	Shu Han		
Liu Bao 劉寶				Gaoping, Shanyang (Weishan County, Shandong)	General	Jin dynasty		
Liu Bao 劉寶					General	Eastern Wu		
Liu Bei 劉備	Xuande 玄德	161	223	Zhuo County, Zhuo (Zhuozhou, Hebei)	Emperor	Shu Han	Han dynasty, Gongsun Zan, Tao Qian, Cao Cao, Yuan Shao, Liu Biao	Sanguozhi vol. 32. See Shu Han family trees.
Liu Bian 劉辯		176	190	Nanyang County, Caiyang (Zaoyang, Hubei)	Emperor	Han dynasty		Houhanshu vol. 9.
Liu Biao 劉表	Jingsheng 景升	142	208	Gaoping, Shanyang (Zoucheng, Shandong)	Noble, politician, warlord	Liu Biao	Han dynasty	Houhanshu vol. 74; Sanguozhi vol. 6.
Liu Bin 劉邠	Lingyuan 令元			Peiguo, Xiang (Suixi County, Anhui)	Politician	Cao Wei		
Liu Chan 劉闡				Jiangxia, Jingling (Qianjiang, Hubei)	Politician	Eastern Wu	Liu Zhang, Shu Han	
Liu Chang 劉昶	Gongrong 公榮			Zhuyi, Peiguo (Su County, Anhui)		Jin dynasty	Cao Wei	
Liu Changren 劉長仁				Bohai (Nanpi County, Hebei)	Politician	Cao Wei		
Liu Chen 劉諶			263	Zhuo County, Zhuo (Zhuozhou, Hebei)	Noble	Shu Han		Sanguozhi vol. 33.
Liu Cheng 劉丞			258		General	Eastern Wu		
Liu Chong 劉寵			197		Noble	Han dynasty		
Liu Chuan 劉川					General	Eastern Wu		
Liu Ci 劉慈					Politician	Cao Wei		
Liu Cong 劉琮				Gaoping, Shanyang (Zoucheng, Shandong)	Politician, warlord	Cao Cao	Liu Biao	Sanguozhi vol. 6.
Liu Cui 劉粹				Peiguo, Xiang (Suixi County, Anhui)	Politician	Jin dynasty		
Liu Dai 劉岱	Gongshan 公山		192	Mouping, Donglai (Northwest of Fushan District, Yantai, Shandong)	Noble, politician, warlord	Liu Dai	Han dynasty	Sanguozhi vol. 1, 49.
Liu Dai 劉岱	Gongshan 公山			Peiguo (Anhui)	General	Cao Cao		Sanguozhi vol. 1.
Liu Dan 劉誕				Jingling, Jiangxia (Tianmen, Hubei)	Politician	Liu Yan		
Liu Deran 劉德然				Zhuo County, Zhuo (Zhuozhou, Hebei)				
Liu Desheng 劉德升	Junsi 君嗣			Yingchuan (Yuzhou City, Henan)	Calligrapher	Han dynasty		
Liu Du 劉度					Politician, warlord	Liu Bei	Han dynasty	Sanguozhi vol. 32.
Liu Dun 劉惇	Ziren 子仁			Pingyuan (Pingyuan County, Shandong)	Advisor, astrologer, diviner	Eastern Wu		Sanguozhi vol. 63.
Liu Dun 劉敦				Nanyang County, Caiyang (Zaoyang, Hubei)	Noble	Han dynasty		
Liu Fan 劉範			194	Jingling, Jiangxia (Tianmen, Hubei)	General	Liu Yan		
Liu Fang 劉放	Ziqi 子棄		250	Fangcheng, Zhuo (Gu'an County, Hebei)	General, politician	Cao Wei		
Liu Fei 劉斐				Anping (Anping County, Hebei)		Cao Wei		
Liu Feng 劉封			220	Changsha (Xiangyin County, Hunan)	General	Liu Bei		Sanguozhi vol. 40.
Liu Fenglin 劉奉林				Guangping, Julu (Jize County, Hebei)				
Liu Fu 劉馥	Yuanying 元穎		208	Xiang County, Pei (Northwest of Suixi County, Anhui)	Politician	Cao Cao		Sanguozhi vol. 15.
Liu Fu 柳甫					Politician	Gongsun Yuan	Cao Wei	
Liu Fu 柳孚						Cao Wei		
Liu Fu 劉阜	Boling 伯陵			Nanyang County, Caiyang (Zaoyang, Hubei)	Politician	Cao Wei		
Liu Gan 劉幹					General	Shu Han		
Liu Gu 劉固				Zhaoguo (Handan, Hebei)	Politician	Cao Wei		
Liu Gui 劉璝					General	Liu Zhang		Liu Kui in RTK 11, 13, 14.
Liu Gui 劉龜					Politician	Cao Wei		
Liu Han 劉漢	Zhongjia 仲嘏			Peiguo (Suixi County, Anhui)	Politician	Jin dynasty		
Liu He 劉和				Zou, Donghai (Zoucheng, Shandong)		Liu Yu		
Liu He 劉何					General	Lü Bu		
Liu He 劉闔					General	Liu Biao		
Liu He 劉郃			228		General	Shu Han		
Liu Hong 劉宏		156	189	Nanyang County, Caiyang (Zaoyang, Hubei)	Emperor	Han dynasty		Houhanshu vol. 8.
Liu Hong 劉宏	Zhongjia 終嘏			Peiguo (Pei County, Jiangsu)	Politician	Jin dynasty		
Liu Hong 劉宏					Politician	Han dynasty		
Liu Hong 劉弘	Zigao 子高			Nanyang County, Anzhong (Nanyang, Dengzhou, Henan)	Politician	Han dynasty		
Liu Hong 劉弘	Heji/Shuhe 和季/叔和	236	306	Peiguo, Xiang (Suixi County, Anhui)	General, politician	Jin dynasty		
Liu Hu 劉虎					General	Liu Biao		
Liu Hui 劉徽				(Zichuan District, Zibo, Shandong)	Mathematician			
Liu Ji 劉基	Jingyu 敬輿	184	233	Donglai, Muping (Muping, Shandong)	Politician	Eastern Wu	Liu Yao	Sanguozhi vol. 49.
Liu Jie 劉節				Jinanguo, Jian (Jiyang County, Shandong)	Politician	Cao Wei		
Liu Jing 劉靖	Wengong 文恭		254	Peiguo (Su County, Anhui)	General	Cao Wei		Sanguozhi vol. 15.
Liu Jing 劉靖					Tribal leader	Xiongnu		
Liu Jing 劉靖				Luzhou (Lu'an, Anhui)	Advisor	Eastern Wu		
Liu Jing 劉靖					General	Dong Zhuo		
Liu Jingzong 劉景宗				Guangling (Yangzhou, Jiangsu)	Politician	Han dynasty		
Liu Jun 劉俊			268		General	Eastern Wu		
Liu Jun 劉雋					Politician	Han dynasty		
Liu Kang 劉康				Nanyang County, Caiyang (Zaoyang, Hubei)	Noble	Han dynasty		
Liu Kongci 劉孔慈					Advisor	Kong Rong		
Liu Kuan 劉寬	Wenrao 文饒	120	185	Huayin (Huayin, Shaanxi)	Politician	Han dynasty		
Liu Kuo 劉括				Fufeng (Xingping, Shaanxi)				
Liu Lei 劉類				Hejianguo, Gaoyang (Gaoyang County, Hebei)	General	Cao Wei		
Liu Li 劉理	Fengxiao 奉孝		244	Zhuo County, Zhuo (Zhuozhou, Hebei)	Prince	Shu Han		
Liu Liang 劉梁	Manshan 曼山			Dongping (Dongping County, Shandong)	Politician	Han dynasty		
Liu Liang 劉良					Diviner			
Liu Lin 劉林				Changsha (Xiangyin County, Hunan)	General	Cao Wei	Shu Han	
Liu Lin 劉琳				Handan, Guangping (Handan, Hebei)	General	Cao Wei		
Liu Ling 劉伶	Bolun 伯倫	221	300	Peiguo (Su County, Anhui)	General	Jin dynasty	Cao Wei	Jin Shu vol. 49.
Liu Lü 留慮					General	Eastern Wu		
Liu Lue 留略				Changshan, Kuaiji (Jinhua, Zhejiang)	General	Eastern Wu		Wu Shu annotation in Sanguozhi vol. 64.
Liu Lue 劉略	Fengxiao 奉孝		279		Politician	Eastern Wu		
Liu Lue 劉略					Politician	Eastern Wu		
Liu Man 劉曼				Nanyang County, Caiyang (Zaoyang, Hubei)	Noble lady	Han dynasty		
Liu Mao 劉瑁				Jingling, Jiangxia (Tianmen, Hubei)	Politician	Liu Zhang	Liu Yan	
Liu Mao 劉茂					General, politician	Cao Wei		
Liu Meng 劉猛					Tribal leader	Xiongnu		
Liu Miao 劉邈				Nanyang County, Caiyang (Zaoyang, Hubei)	Noble	Han dynasty		
Liu Min 劉敏				Quanling, Lingling (North of Lingling District, Hunan)	General	Shu Han		
Liu Ning 劉寧					General	Eastern Wu	Shu Han	
Liu Pan 劉磐				Gaoping, Shanyang (Zoucheng, Shandong)	General	Liu Biao		Sanguozhi vol. 36, 49.
Liu Pi 劉辟			201		General	Yellow Turban rebels		
Liu Ping 留平			273	Changshan, Kuaiji (Jinhua, Zhejiang)	General	Eastern Wu		
Liu Ping 劉平				Pingyuan (Pingyuan County, Shandong)				
Liu Pu 柳浦					General	Gongsun Yuan		
Liu Pu 劉普				Chengde, Huainan (South of Shou County, Anhui)		Han dynasty		
Liu Qi 劉琦			209	Gaoping, Shanyang (Zoucheng, Shandong)	Politician, warlord	Liu Qi	Liu Biao	Sanguozhi vol. 6, 32.
Liu Qiao 劉喬	Zhongyan 仲彥			Nanyang (Nanyang, Henan)	General, politician	Jin dynasty		
Liu Qin 劉欽					Politician	Cao Wei		
Liu Qu 劉璩				Zhuo County, Zhuo (Zhuozhou, Hebei)	Noble	Shu Han		
Liu Rong 柳榮				Songyang (Songyang County, Zhejiang)	Politician	Eastern Wu		
Liu Ruo 劉若					General	Han dynasty		
Liu Shan 劉禪	Gongsi 公嗣	207	271	Zhuo County, Zhuo (Zhuozhou, Hebei)	Emperor	Shu Han		Sanguozhi vol. 33. See Shu Han family trees.
Liu Shang 劉尚				Donglai, Muping (Muping, Shandong)	General	Jin dynasty		
Liu Shao 劉劭	Kongcai 孔才			Handan, Guangping (Handan, Hebei)	Politician	Cao Wei	Han dynasty	Sanguozhi vol. 21.
Liu Shao 劉邵					General	Eastern Wu		
Liu Shen 柳伸	Yahou 雅厚			Chengdu, Shu (Chengdu, Sichuan)	Politician	Jin dynasty	Shu Han	Huayang Guo Zhi vol. 11. 03.
Liu Shengbo 劉聖博						Han dynasty		
Liu Shengshu 劉聲叔					Scholar	Eastern Wu		
Liu Shi 劉寔	Zizhen 字真	220	310	Gaotang, Qingzhou (Pingyuan, Shandong)	Politician	Jin dynasty	Cao Wei	Jin Shu vol. 41.
Liu Shi 劉式				Yiyang (Zaoyang, Hubei)	Politician	Shu Han		
Liu Shi 劉石			193		Rebel leader	Zhang Yan		
Liu Shuo 劉鑠				Donglai, Muping (Muping, Shandong)	General	Eastern Wu		
Liu Tao 劉陶	Ziqi 子奇			Yingchuan, Yingyin (South of Xuchang, Henan)	Advisor, politician	Han dynasty		
Liu Tao 劉陶	Jizhi 季治			Chengde, Huainan (South of Shou County, Anhui)	Politician	Cao Wei		
Liu Wan 劉琬					Politician	Han dynasty		
Liu Wangzhi 劉望之				Anzhong, Nanyang (Dengzhou, Henan)	Advisor, politician	Liu Biao		
Liu Wei 劉韙				Mouping, Donglai (Yantai, Shandong)	Noble	Han dynasty		
Liu Wei 劉偉						Cao Wei		
Liu Wei 劉威				Langya (Linyi, Shandong)	Politician	Han dynasty		
Liu Wei 劉衛			184		General	Han dynasty		
Liu Weitai 劉緯台					Diviner	Gongsun Zan		
Liu Wu 劉武				Yiyang (Zaoyang, Hubei)	Politician	Shu Han		
Liu Xi 劉熙	Chengguo 成國			Beihai (Shouguang, Shandong)	Scholar, politician	Han dynasty		
Liu Xi 劉熙				Nanyang County, Caiyang (Zaoyang, Hubei)	Noble	Han dynasty		
Liu Xi 劉熙				Peiguo (Su County, Anhui)	Politician	Cao Wei		
Liu Xi 劉熙				Fangcheng, Zhuo (Gu'an County, Hebei)	Politician	Cao Wei		
Liu Xia 劉夏					Politician	Cao Wei		
Liu Xian 劉先	Shizong 始宗			Jingzhou, Lingling (Lingling District, Hunan)	Politician, advisor	Cao Cao	Han dynasty, Liu Biao	
Liu Xian 劉羡				Donghai county (Tancheng County, Shandong)	Warlord	Cao Wei	Liu Xian	
Liu Xian 劉賢			254		Politician	Cao Wei		
Liu Xian 劉獻					Politician	Yuan Shao		
Liu Xiang 劉祥					General	Han dynasty		
Liu Xiang 劉詳					General	Yuan Shu		
Liu Xiao 劉囂	Chongning 重寧			Changsha County (Changsha, Hunan)	Politician	Han dynasty		
Liu Xie 劉協	Bohe 伯和	181	234	Nanyang County, Caiyang (Zaoyang, Hubei)	Emperor	Han dynasty		Houhanshu vol. 9.
Liu Xie 劉偕					Politician	Han dynasty		
Liu Xin 劉昕					General	Cao Wei		
Liu Xiong/Liu Xiongming 劉雄/劉雄鳴				Lantian (Xi'an, Lantian County, Shaanxi)	General	Cao Cao	Han dynasty	
Liu Xiu 劉脩				Gaoping, Shanyang (Zoucheng, Shandong)	Politician	Cao Wei	Liu Biao	
Liu Xu 劉許	Wensheng 文生			Fangcheng, Zhuo (Gu'an County, Hebei)	General	Jin dynasty	Cao Wei	
Liu Xuan 劉璇/劉璿	Wenheng 文衡	224	264	Zhuo County, Zhuo (Zhuozhou, Hebei)	Noble	Cao Wei	Shu Han	Sanguozhi vol. 33.
Liu Xun 劉勛	Zitai 子台			Langya (Jiaonan, Shandong)	General, warlord	Cao Wei	Yuan Shu, Liu Xun	Sanguozhi vol. 46.
Liu Xun 劉循				Jingling, Jiangxia (Tianmen, Hubei)		Liu Zhang		Sanguozhi vol. 32.
Liu Xun 劉勳					General	Han dynasty		
Liu Xun 劉勳					Politician	Cao Wei		
Liu Xun 劉詢					General	Han dynasty		
Liu Yan 劉焉	Junlang 君郎	132	194	Jingling, Jiangxia (Tianmen, Hubei)	Noble, politician, warlord	Liu Yan	Han dynasty	Houhanshu vol. 75; Sanguozhi vol. 31.
Liu Yan 劉琰	Weishuo 威碩		234	Lu (Qufu, Shandong)	Politician	Shu Han		
Liu Yan 劉彥				Kuaiji (Shaoxing, Zhejiang)	Politician	Han dynasty		
Liu Yan 劉延		166	221		General	Cao Wei		
Liu Yang 劉陽				Peiguo (Pei County, Jiangsu)	Politician	Han dynasty		
Liu Yao 劉曜					General	Cao Wei		
Liu Yao 劉繇	Zhengli 正禮	156	197	Mouping, Donglai (Northwest of Fushan District, Yantai, Shandong)	Politician, warlord	Liu Yao		Sanguozhi vol. 49.
Liu Ye 劉曄	Ziyang 子揚		234	Chengde, Huainan (South of Shou County, Anhui)	Advisor, politician	Cao Wei	Han dynasty	Sanguozhi vol. 14.
Liu Yi 劉廙	Gongsi 恭嗣	180	221	Anzhong, Nanyang (Southeast of Zhenping County, Henan)	Politician	Cao Wei		Sanguozhi vol. 21.
Liu Yi 劉毅	Zhongxiong 仲雄	216	285	Yi, Donglai (Laizhou, Shandong)	Politician	Jin dynasty	Cao Wei	Jin Shu vol. 45.
Liu Yi 劉懿				Nanyang County, Caiyang (Zaoyang, Hubei)	Noble	Han dynasty		
Liu Yi 柳毅					Politician	Han dynasty		
Liu Yi 劉翊	Zixiang 子相			Yingyin County, Yingchuan (Xuchang County, Henan)	Politician	Han dynasty		
Liu Yi 劉壹					Politician	Han dynasty		
Liu Yin 柳隱	Xiuran 休然	189	269	Chengdu, Shu (Chengdu, Sichuan)	General	Jin dynasty	Shu Han, Cao Wei	
Liu Yin 劉隱					Politician	Han dynasty		
Liu Ying 劉穎				Guangling (Yangzhou, Jiangsu)	Scholar			
Liu Yixun 劉義遜					Advisor	Kong Rong		
Liu Yong 劉永	Gongshou 公壽			Zhuo County, Zhuo (Zhuozhou, Hebei)	Prince	Shu Han		
Liu Yong 劉邕	Nanhe 南和			Yiyang (Zaoyang, Hubei)	General	Shu Han		
Liu You 劉由					General	Sun Ce		
Liu Yu 劉虞	Bo'an 伯安		193	Zou, Donghai (Zoucheng, Shandong)	Noble, politician, warlord	Liu Yu		Houhanshu vol. 73; Sanguozhi vol. 8.
Liu Yu 劉㝢				Chengde, Huainan (South of Shou County, Anhui)		Cao Wei		
Liu Yu 劉輿				Mouping, Donglai (Yantai, Shandong)	Politician	Han dynasty		
Liu Yuan 柳遠					Politician	Gongsun Yuan		
Liu Yuanqi 劉元起				Zhuo County, Zhuo (Zhuozhou, Hebei)				
Liu Zan 留贊	Zhengming 正明	183	255	Changshan, Kuaiji (Jinhua, Zhejiang)	General	Eastern Wu		Wu Shu annotation in Sanguozhi vol. 64.
Liu Zhang 劉璋	Jiyu 季玉		219	Jingling, Jiangxia (Tianmen, Hubei)	Noble, warlord	Liu Bei	Liu Yan, Liu Zhang	Sanguozhi vol. 31.
Liu Zhan 劉展					General	Han dynasty		
Liu Zhao 劉兆	Yanshi 延世			Dongping (Dongping County, Shandong)	Scholar			
Liu Zhao 劉肇					Politician	Cao Wei		
Liu Zhen 劉楨	Gonggan 公幹		217	Dongping (Dongping County, Shandong)	Scholar			
Liu Zheng 劉政				Beihaiguo (Changle County, Shandong)		Han dynasty		
Liu Zheng 劉正				Zhuo County, Zhuo (Zhuozhou, Hebei)	Politician	Cao Wei		
Liu Zheng 劉整					General	Cao Wei		
Liu Zhi 劉祗				Shanyang County (Jining, Shandong)		Han dynasty		
Liu Zhi 劉智				Gaotang, Qingzhou (Pingyuan, Shandong)	Politician	Cao Wei		
Liu Zhou 劉胄		233			Rebel leader	Nanman		
Liu Zhu 劉助					General	Eastern Wu		
Liu Zhu 柳朱				Songyang (Songyang County, Zhejiang)				
Liu Zhu 劉柱					General	Cao Cao		
Liu Zihui 劉子惠					Politician	Han Fu		
Liu Ziping 劉子平				Pingyuan (Pingyuan County, Shandong)	General	Han dynasty		
Liu Zu 劉租					Physician	Han dynasty		
Liu Zuan 劉纂					General	Eastern Wu		
Long Youna/Zhanglong Youna 龍佑那/張龍佑那				Western Yunnan	King	Baizi, Jianning	Shu Han	Unofficial history of Nanzhao
Lou Fa 婁發					Rebel leader		Liu Zhang	
Lou Gui 婁圭	Zibo 子伯			Nanyang (Nanyang, Henan)	Advisor, general	Cao Cao	Liu Biao	Sanguozhi vol. 1, 12.
Lou Ju 樓據				Qi County, Pei (Suzhou, Anhui)		Eastern Wu		
Lou Xuan 樓玄	Chengxian 承先			Qi County, Pei (Suzhou, Anhui)	Politician	Eastern Wu		Sanguozhi vol. 65.
Lou Yi 樓異					General	Cao Cao		
Louban 樓班			207		Tribal leader	Wuhuan		Sanguozhi vol. 30.
Lu Cui 路粹	Wenwei 文蔚			Chenliu (Kaifeng, Henan)	Politician	Cao Cao	Han dynasty	
Lu Dan 陸耽			303	Wu County, Wu (Suzhou, Jiangsu)	Politician	Jin dynasty	Eastern Wu	
Lu Fan 路蕃					General	Cao Wei		
Lu Fan 盧藩				Zhuo County, Zhuo (Zhuozhou, Hebei)	Politician	Cao Wei		
Lu He 路合					Rebel leader			
Lu Hong 陸宏				Wu County, Wu (Suzhou, Jiangsu)	General	Eastern Wu		
Lu Hong 盧洪					General	Cao Cao		
Lu Ji 陸績	Gongji 公紀	187	219	Wu County, Wu (Suzhou, Jiangsu)	Advisor, politician	Sun Quan		Sanguozhi vol. 57.
Lu Ji 陸機	Shiheng 士衡	261	303	Wu County, Wu (Suzhou, Jiangsu)	Scholar, writer	Jin dynasty	Eastern Wu	Sanguozhi vol. 58.
Lu Jing 陸景	Shiren 士仁	250	280	Wu County, Wu (Suzhou, Jiangsu)	General	Eastern Wu		Sanguozhi vol. 58.
Lu Jun 陸駿	Jicai 季才			Wu County, Wu (Suzhou, Jiangsu)	Politician	Han dynasty		Sanguozhi vol. 58.
Lu Kai 陸凱	Jingfeng 敬風	198	269	Wu County, Wu (Suzhou, Jiangsu)	General, politician	Eastern Wu		Sanguozhi vol. 61.
Lu Kang 陸抗	Youjie 幼節	226	274	Wu County, Wu (Suzhou, Jiangsu)	General	Eastern Wu		Sanguozhi vol. 58.
Lu Kang 陸康	Jining 季寧	126	195	Wu County, Wu (Suzhou, Jiangsu)	Politician	Han dynasty		Houhanshu vol. 31.
Lu Kui 魯馗				Fufeng (Xingping, Shaanxi)	Politician	Han dynasty		
Lu Mao 陸瑁	Zizhang 子璋		239	Wu County, Wu (Suzhou, Jiangsu)	Politician	Eastern Wu		Sanguozhi vol. 57, 58.
Lu Mu 魯睦				Dongcheng, Linhuai (Southeast of Dingyuan County, Anhui)	General	Eastern Wu		
Lu Pan 鹿磐					General	Cao Wei		
Lu Qin 盧欽	Ziruo 子若		278	Zhuo County, Zhuo (Zhuo County, Hebei)	General, politician	Jin dynasty	Cao Wei	
Lu Rui 陸叡				Wu County, Wu (Suzhou, Jiangsu)	General	Eastern Wu		
Lu Shang 陸尚				Wu County, Wu (Suzhou, Jiangsu)	Lady Xu's ex-husband			
Lu Shi 陸式				Wu County, Wu (Suzhou, Jiangsu)	General	Eastern Wu		
Lu Shi 逯式				Jiangxia (Wuhan, Hubei)		Cao Wei		
Lu Shu 魯淑		217	274	Dongcheng, Linhuai (Southeast of Dingyuan County, Anhui)	General	Eastern Wu		Sanguozhi vol. 54.
Lu Su 魯肅	Zijing 子敬	172	217	Dongcheng, Linhuai (Southeast of Dingyuan County, Anhui)	General, politician	Sun Quan		Sanguozhi vol. 54.
Lu Ting 盧挺	Zihu 子笏			Zhuo County, Zhuo (Zhuo County, Hebei)	Politician	Jin dynasty	Cao Wei	
Lu Xi 陸喜	Wenzhong 文仲			Wu County, Wu (Suzhou, Jiangsu)	Politician	Jin dynasty	Eastern Wu	Sanguozhi vol. 57; Jin Shu vol. 77.
Lu Xi 魯昔					Tribal leader	Wuhuan		
Lu Xian 盧顯				Dongguan, Langya (Yishui County, Shandong)		Cao Wei		
Lu Xu 盧敘				Mao, Kuaiji (Ningbo, Zhejiang)		Eastern Wu		
Lu Xuan 陸玄				Wu County, Wu (Suzhou, Jiangsu)	General	Eastern Wu		Sanguozhi vol. 58.
Lu Xun 陸遜	Boyan 伯言	183	245	Wu County, Wu (Suzhou, Jiangsu)	General, politician	Eastern Wu		
Lu Yan 陸延				Wu County, Wu (Suzhou, Jiangsu)		Eastern Wu		Sanguozhi vol. 58.
Lu Yan 陸晏			280	Wu County, Wu (Suzhou, Jiangsu)	General	Eastern Wu		Sanguozhi vol. 58.
Lu Yi 陸禕				Wu County, Wu (Suzhou, Jiangsu)	General	Eastern Wu		
Lu Yin 陸胤	Jingzong 敬宗			Wu County, Wu (Suzhou, Jiangsu)	Politician	Eastern Wu		
Lu Yu 盧毓	Zijia 子家	183	257	Zhuo County, Zhuo (Zhuo County, Hebei)	Politician	Cao Wei		Sanguozhi vol. 22.
Lu Yu 陸紆	Shupan 叔盤			Wu County, Wu (Suzhou, Jiangsu)	General	Han dynasty		Sanguozhi vol. 58.
Lu Yun 陸雲	Shilong 士龍	262	303	Wu County, Wu (Suzhou, Jiangsu)	General, politician	Jin dynasty	Eastern Wu	Sanguozhi vol. 58.
Lu Yusheng 陸鬱生				Wu County, Wu (Suzhou, Jiangsu)				
Lu Zhao 路招					General	Cao Wei		
Lu Zhao 陸昭					Politician	Han dynasty		
Lu Zhi 盧植	Zigan 子幹		192	Zhuo County, Zhuo (Zhuozhou, Hebei)	General, politician, scholar	Han dynasty		Houhanshu vol. 8, 72; Sanguozhi vol. 32.
Lu Zhi 魯芝	Shiying 世英			Fufeng (Xingping, Shaanxi)	General	Cao Wei		
Lü An 呂安	Zhongti 仲悌		262	Dongping (Dongping County, Shandong)		Cao Wei		
Lü Ba 呂霸				Fupo, Runan (Southeast of Funan County, Anhui)	General	Eastern Wu		Sanguozhi vol. 54.
Lü Bing 呂並					Rebel leader			
Lü Boshe 呂伯奢			189	Chenggao (Xingyang, Henan)				Lü Baishe in RTK 11.
Lü Bu 呂布	Fengxian 奉先		199	Jiuyuan, Wuyuan (in Baotou, Inner Mongolia)	General, warlord	Lü Bu	Ding Yuan, Dong Zhuo, Yuan Shao, Zhang Yang, Liu Bei	Houhanshu vol. 75; Sanguozhi vol. 7.
Lü Chang 呂常		161	221		General	Cao Cao		
Lü Chang 呂常				Nanyang (Nanyang, Henan)	General	Liu Yan	Han dynasty	
Lü Chen 呂辰				Nanyang (Nanyang, Henan)	General	Shu Han		
Lü Cong 呂琮				Fupo, Runan (Southeast of Funan County, Anhui)	General	Eastern Wu		
Lü Cui 呂粹	Jiti 季悌			Dongping (Dongping County, Shandong)	Politician	Cao Wei		
Lü Dai 呂岱	Dinggong 定公	161	256	Hailing, Guangling (Rugao, Jiangsu)	General	Eastern Wu		Sanguozhi vol. 60.
Lü Fan 呂範	Ziheng 子衡		228	Xiyang, Runan (Taihe County, Anhui)	General	Sun Quan		Sanguozhi vol. 56.
Lü Fan 呂翻				Rencheng (Jining, Shandong)	Politician	Cao Wei		
Lü Gong/ Lü Jie 呂公/呂介					General	Liu Biao		
Lü Gong 呂貢					Politician	Cao Wei		
Lü Gui 呂桂				Rencheng (Jining, Shandong)	Politician	Cao Wei		
Lü He 呂合					Rebel leader			
Lü Jian 呂建					General	Cao Cao		
Lü Ju 呂据	Shiyi 世議		256	Xiyang, Runan (Taihe County, Anhui)	General	Eastern Wu		Sanguozhi vol. 47, 48, 56.
Lü Ju 閭舉				Jiangxia (Ezhou, Hubei)		Eastern Wu		
Lü Kai 呂凱	Jiping 季平		225	Buwei, Yongchang (Baoshan, Yunnan)	Politician	Shu Han		Sanguozhi vol. 43.
Lü Kai 呂凱				Hailing, Guangling (Rugao, Jiangsu)	Politician	Eastern Wu		
Lü Kuang 呂曠				Dongping (Dongping County, Shandong)	General	Cao Cao	Yuan Shao, Yuan Shang, Yuan Tan	
Lü Meng 呂蒙	Ziming 子明	178	220	Fupo, Runan (Southeast of Funan County, Anhui)	General	Sun Quan		Sanguozhi vol. 54.
Lü Mu 呂睦				Fupo, Runan (Southeast of Funan County, Anhui)	General	Eastern Wu		
Lü Qi 呂岐					Politician	Han dynasty		
Lü Qian 呂虔	Zike 子恪			Rencheng (Jining, Shandong)	General	Cao Wei		
Lü Qiang 呂強	Hansheng 漢盛		184	Chenggao (Xingyang, Henan)	Politician	Han dynasty		
Lü Shu 呂淑	Weide 偉德		311	Nan'an, Qianwei (Leshan, Sichuan)	Politician	Jin dynasty	Shu Han, Cao Wei	Huayang Guo Zhi vol. 11. 17.
Lü Weihuang 呂威璜			200		General	Yuan Shao		Sanguozhi vol. 1.
Lü Xi 呂習					Politician	Cao Wei		
Lü Xiang 呂翔				Dongping (Dongping County, Shandong)	General	Cao Cao	Yuan Shao, Yuan Shang, Yuan Tan	
Lü Xiang 呂祥				Buwei, Yongchang (Baoshan, Yunnan)	Politician	Jin dynasty	Shu Han	
Lü Xing 呂興			264			Eastern Wu		
Lü Xuan 呂宣					General	Cao Wei		
Lü Xun 呂巽	Changti 長悌			Dongping (Dongping County, Shandong)	Politician	Cao Wei		
Lü Ya 呂雅				Nanyang (Nanyang, Henan)	Politician	Jin dynasty	Shu Han	
Lü Yi 呂乂	Jiyang 季陽		251	Nanyang (Nanyang, Henan)	Politician	Shu Han		
Lü Yi 呂壹			238		Politician	Eastern Wu		
Lü You 呂由					General	Tao Qian		
Lü Zhao 呂昭	Zizhan 子展			Dongping (Dongping County, Shandong)	General	Cao Wei		
Luan Wenbo 欒文博					Scholar	Han dynasty		
Lun Zhi 倫直			238		General	Gongsun Yuan		Jin Shu vol. 1.
Luo Hui 羅暉	Shujing 叔景			Duling (Xi'an, Shaanxi)	Calligrapher, general	Han dynasty		
Luo Jun 駱俊	Xiaoyuan 孝遠			Wushang, Kuaiji (Yiwu, Zhejiang)	Politician	Han dynasty		
Luo Li 羅厲					Rebel leader	Sun Quan		
Luo Lu 駱祿					Politician	Cao Wei		
Luo Meng 羅蒙				Xiangyang (Xiangyang, Hubei)	Politician	Shu Han		
Luo Shang 羅尚	Jingzhi 敬之		310	Xiangyang (Xiangyang, Hubei)	General	Jin dynasty		
Luo Shi 羅市					Rebel leader	Yellow Turban rebels		
Luo Tong 駱統	Gongxu 公緒	193	228	Wushang, Kuaiji (Yiwu, Zhejiang)	General	Sun Quan		Sanguozhi vol. 57.
Luo Xi 羅襲				Xiangyang (Xiangyang, Hubei)	General	Jin dynasty		
Luo Xian 羅憲	Lingze 令則		270	Xiangyang (Xiangyang, Hubei)	General	Jin dynasty	Shu Han, Cao Wei	Sanguozhi vol. 41; Jin Shu vol. 57.
Luo Xiu 駱秀			264	Wushang, Kuaiji (Yiwu, Zhejiang)	General	Eastern Wu		
Luo Yao 駱曜					Rebel leader			
