= Sangokushi (manga) =

Manga by Mitsuteru Yokoyama

- Cover of the tankōbon volume 60, featuring Jiang Wei

三国志
- Manga
- Written by: Mitsuteru Yokoyama
- Published by: Ushio Shuppansha
- Magazine: Comic Tom
- Original run: 1971 – 1987
- Volumes: 60
- Anime television series

Mitsuteru Yokoyama's Sangokushi
- Directed by: Seiji Okuda
- Produced by: Hiroyuki Yano; Kenji Yoshida
- Written by: Jinzō Toriumi (Otori Kobo)
- Music by: Masatoshi Nishimura
- Studio: Azeta Pictures
- Original network: TXN (TV Tokyo)
- Original run: October 18, 1991 – September 25, 1992
- Episodes: 47

Sangokushi (三国志) is a Japanese manga series written and illustrated by Mitsuteru Yokoyama, based on Eiji Yoshikawa's retelling of the 14th century Chinese literary classic Romance of the Three Kingdoms. It was adapted into an anime television called Mitsuteru Yokoyama's Sangokushi (横山光輝 三国志, Yokoyama Mitsuteru Sangokushi).

As of May 2020, the manga series had sold over 80 million copies in circulation, making it one of the best-selling manga series of all time.

== Characters ==
=== Shu Han ===
- Liu Bei Xuande (劉備玄徳, Ryūbi Gentoku) Voiced by: Daiki Nakamura
- Guan Yu Yunchang (関羽雲長, Kanu Unchō) Voiced by: Shinpachi Tsuji
- Zhang Fei Yide (張飛翼徳, Chōhi Yokutoku) Voiced by: Keiji Fujiwara
- Zhao Yun Zilong (趙雲子龍, Chōun Shiryū) Voiced by: Jūrōta Kosugi
- Zhuge Liang Kongming (諸葛亮孔明, Shokatsuryō Kōmei) Voiced by: Show Hayami
- Hong Furong (鴻芙蓉, Kōfuyō)

An original character in the manga and based on Lady Gan, she is a daughter of Hong family, who Zhang Fei served. When Liu Bei escapes from the Yellow Turban, he saves her and they fall in love with each other.

- Xianglan (香蘭, Kōran) Voiced by: Satomi Kōrogi and Kikuko Inoue

An original character in the anime and based on Lady Mi, she is Liu Bei's apprentice who grew up to be his wife. She died of her injuries during the Battle of Changban.

=== Cao Wei ===
- Cao Cao Mengde (曹操孟徳, Sōsō Mōtoku) Voiced by: Yasunori Matsumoto
- Xiahou Chun (夏侯淳, Kakōjun) Voiced by: Kōsuke Meguro

Although his name should be Xiahou Dun (夏侯惇), both the anime and the manga named him Xiahou Chun (夏侯淳).

- Dian Wei (典韋, Ten'i) Voiced by: Masahiro Anzai
- Zhang Liao (張遼, Chōryō) Voiced by: Tomomichi Nishimura
- Xun Yu (荀彧, Jun'iku) Voiced by: Masashi Ebara and Michitaka Kobayashi
- Cheng Yu (程昱, Teiiku) Voiced by: Bin Shimada and Jun Hazumi
- Cao Hong (曹洪, Sōkō)

=== Sun Wu ===
- Sun Quan Zhongmou (孫権仲謀, Sonken Chūbō) Voiced by: Nobuo Tobita
- Sun Jian (孫堅, Sonken) Voiced by: Bin Shimada
- Sun Ce (孫策, Sonsaku) Voiced by: Shigeru Nakahara
- Zhou Yu (周瑜, Shūyu) Voiced by: Unshō Ishizuka
- Lu Su (魯粛, Roshuku) Voiced by: Aruno Tahara
- Zhuge Jin (諸葛瑾, Shokatsukin) Voiced by: Masami Kikuchi and Kazuo Hayashi

=== Others ===
- Emperor Xian (献帝, Kentei) Voiced by: Ai Orikasa and Hikaru Midorikawa
- Dong Zhuo (董卓, Tōtaku) Voiced by: Ryūzaburō Ōtomo
- Lü Bu Fengxian (呂布奉先, Ryofu Hōsen) Voiced by: Kazuki Yao
- Diaochan (貂蝉, Chōsen) Voiced by: Ai Orikasa
- Chen Gong Gongdai (陳宮公台, Chinkyū Kōdai) Voiced by: Hirotaka Suzuoki
- Yuan Shao (袁紹, Enshō) Voiced by: Ikuya Sawaki
- Gongsun Zan (公孫瓚, Kōsonsan) Voiced by: Nobuaki Fukuda
- Liu Biao (劉表, Ryūhyō) Voiced by: Kazuhiko Kishino
- Narrator Voiced by: Shinji Ogawa

== Media ==
=== Manga ===
The manga was first serialized in the Kibō no Tomo magazine, which changed its name to Comic World in 1978, and then to Comic Tom in 1980.

Although Eiji Yoshikawa only wrote the story up to Zhuge Liang's death in the Battle of Wuzhang Plains, the manga continued until the fall of Shu Han.

With this manga, Mitsuteru Yokoyama won the 1991 Japanese Cartoonist Association Award for Excellence.

=== Anime ===
The anime was largely faithful to the manga, though it centered mainly on the camps of Liu Bei and Cao Cao, often minimizing the scenes of other camps. The anime stopped after the Battle of Red Cliffs, which is about the midway through the manga series.

==== Theme songs ====
- Opening
  - "River of Time" (時の河, Toki no Kawa) by Fence of Defense
  - "Don't Look Back" by Fence of Defense
- Ending
  - "Sky" (空, Sora) by Mimori Yusa
  - "Standing Alone" by Fence of Defense

== Reception ==
By May 2020, the manga series had sold over 80 million copies in circulation.
