= Shu Han family trees =

This article contains the family trees of members of the Liu clan, who ruled the state of Shu Han (221-263) in the Three Kingdoms period (220-280) in China. They were related to the House of Liu, the imperial clan of the Han dynasty.

== Liu Bei's ancestors ==
Liu Bei's biography in the Sanguozhi stated that Liu Bei was a descendant of Liu Sheng (Prince of Zhongshan), who was a son of Emperor Jing. Liu Sheng's son was Liu Zhen.

However, the Dianlue claimed that Liu Bei descended from the Marquis of Linyi. Based on historical records in the Han Shu and the Houhanshu, there were two Marquis of Linyi lineages which could be traced to Emperor Jing's sons, hence there were another two lines from which Liu Bei could have possibly descended.

The central line in the family tree below shows the Liu Sheng lineage, while the other two show the Marquis of Linyi lineages.

Liu Qi 劉啟 (Emperor Jing 景帝)
Liu Fa 劉發 (Prince Ding of Changsha 長沙定王)	Liu Sheng 劉勝 (Prince Jing of Zhongshan 中山靖王)	Liu Shun 劉舜 (Prince Xian of Changshan 常山憲王)
Liu Mai 劉買 (Marquis Jie of Chongling 舂陵節侯)	Liu Zhen 劉貞 (Marquis of Lucheng Ting 陆城亭侯 )	Liu Ping 劉平 (Prince Qing of Zhending 真定頃王)
Liu Wai 劉外	Liu Yan 劉偃 (Prince Lie of Zhending 真定烈王)
Liu Hui 劉回	Liu You 劉由 (Prince Xiao of Zhending 真定孝王)
Liu Qin 劉欽	Liu Yong 劉雍 (Prince An of Zhending 真定安王)
Liu Yan 劉縯 (Prince Wu of Qi 齊武王, eldest brother of Emperor Guangwu)	Liu Pu 劉普 (Prince Gong of Zhending 真定共王)
Liu Xing 劉興 (Prince Jing of Beihai 北海靖王)	Liu Rang 劉讓 (Marquis of Linyi 臨邑侯)
Liu Fu 劉復 (Marquis of Linyi 臨邑侯)
Liu Taotu 劉騊駼 (Marquis of Linyi 臨邑侯)

== Liu Bei ==
Liu Xiong 劉雄
Liu Hong 劉弘	Liu Zijing 劉子敬
Wu Yi 吳懿; Ziyuan 子遠	Empress Mu 穆皇后
Lady Mi 麋氏	Mi Zhu 麋竺; Zizhong 子仲	Mi Fang 麋芳; Zifang 子方
Lady Gan 甘氏	Liu Bei 劉備; Xuande 玄德
Lady Sun 孫氏	Sun Quan 孫權; Zhongmou 仲謀
Liu Shan 劉禪; Gongsi 公嗣
Liu Yong 劉永; Gongshou 公壽	Daughter (name unknown)	Daughter (name unknown)	Liu Feng^{1} 劉封	Liu Li 劉理; Fengxiao 奉孝
Liu Yong's son (name unknown)	Liu Yin 劉胤	Liu Ji 劉輯
Liu Xuan 劉玄	Liu Cheng 劉承

Liu Bei's father was Liu Hong. Liu Hong's father was Liu Xiong. Liu Bei's uncle was Liu Zijing.

Liu Bei had three wives: Lady Mi, Lady Sun and Empress Mu, and at least one recorded concubine: Lady Gan. Lady Mi was the younger sister of Mi Zhu and Mi Fang; Lady Sun was Sun Quan's younger sister (see Eastern Wu family trees for details); Empress Mu, née Wu, was Wu Yi's younger sister.

Lady Gan bore Liu Shan. Liu Yong and Liu Li were also Liu Bei's sons and were Liu Shan's younger half-brothers. Liu Yong and Liu Li were born to different mothers. Liu Bei had two daughters, who were captured by Cao Chun during the Battle of Changban. Liu Feng was Liu Bei's adopted son.

Liu Li had two sons: Liu Yin and Liu Ji. Liu Yin's son was Liu Cheng. Liu Yong's grandson was Liu Xuan.

^{1}Liu Feng was Liu Bei's adopted son.

== Liu Shan ==
Zhang Fei 張飛; Yide 益德	Lady Li 李昭儀
Liu Shan 劉禪; Gongsi 公嗣
Lady Wang 王貴人
Empress Jing'ai 敬哀皇后	Empress Zhang 張皇后
Liu Xuan 劉璿; Wenheng 文衡
Liu Yao 劉瑤	Liu Cong 劉琮	Liu Zan 劉瓚
Liu Qian^{1} 劉虔	Liu Xun 劉恂	Liu Chen 劉諶

Liu Shan had four wives: Empress Jing'ai, Empress Zhang, Lady Li and Lady Wang. Empress Jing'ai, née Zhang, was Empress Zhang's elder sister. Both of them were Zhang Fei's daughters.

Lady Wang bore Liu Xuan. Liu Shan had another six sons: Liu Yao, Liu Cong, Liu Zan, Liu Chen, Liu Xun and Liu Qian. The identities of their mothers were not known.

^{1}Liu Qian's name was recorded as "Liu Qu" (劉璩) in the Shu Shipu.

== See also ==
- Cao Wei family trees
- Eastern Wu family trees
- Family tree of Sima Yi
