= Liu Li (Three Kingdoms) =

Chinese imperial prince of Shu Han state (died 244)

Liu Li 劉理

Prince of Anping (安平王)
- Tenure: 230 – May or June 244
- Successor: Liu Yin

Prince of Liang (梁王)
- Tenure: July 221 – 230
- Born: between 207 and 221
- Died: May or June 244 (Note: Liu Shan's biography in the Sanguozhi recorded that Liu Li died in the 4th month of the 7th year of the Yanxi era of Liu Shan's reign. This month corresponds to 25 May to 22 June 244 in the Gregorian calendar.)
- Spouse: Lady Ma
- Issue: Liu Yin; Liu Ji
Names
- Family name: Liu (劉); Given name: Li (理); Courtesy name: Fengxiao (奉孝)
Posthumous name
- Prince Dao (悼王)
- House: House of Liu
- Father: Liu Bei

Liu Li (died May or June 244), courtesy name Fengxiao, was an imperial prince of the state of Shu Han in the Three Kingdoms period of China. He was a son of Liu Bei, the founding emperor of Shu, and a younger half-brother of Liu Shan, the second Shu emperor.

== Life ==
Liu Li was born in an unknown year. His father, Liu Bei, was a warlord of the late Eastern Han dynasty who became the founding emperor of the state of Shu Han in the Three Kingdoms period. His mother was one of Liu Bei's concubines. He was a younger half-brother of Liu Shan, Liu Bei's successor and the second emperor of Shu. He was born to a different mother from Liu Yong, another half-brother of Liu Shan.

Sometime in July 221, about three months after Liu Bei became emperor, he sent Xu Jing, the Minister over the Masses, as an emissary to read out an imperial edict and grant Liu Li the title "Prince of Liang" (梁王).

In 230, during Liu Shan's reign, Liu Li's title was changed to "Prince of Anping" (安平王). He died in 244 and was honoured with the posthumous title "Prince Dao" (悼王).

== Descendants ==
Liu Li's son, Liu Yin (劉胤), inherited his father's peerage as the Prince of Anping. He died in 256 and was honoured with the posthumous title "Prince Ai" (哀王). Liu Yin's son, Liu Cheng (劉承), became the next Prince of Anping, but died a year later in 257 and was posthumously honoured as "Prince Shang" (殤王).

Liu Li had another son, Liu Ji (劉輯), who held the title "Marquis of Wuyi" (武邑侯). In 261, Liu Shan issued an imperial edict ordering Liu Ji to succeed his nephew Liu Cheng as the next Prince of Anping. In 264, the following year after Shu was conquered by its rival state, Wei, Liu Ji moved to Luoyang, the Wei imperial capital. The Wei government appointed him as a Commandant of Equipage (奉車都尉) and enfeoffed him as a district marquis (鄉侯).

== See also ==
- Lists of people of the Three Kingdoms
- Shu Han family trees
