= Lady Mi =

Late 2nd century Chinese noblewoman

Lady Mi 麋夫人
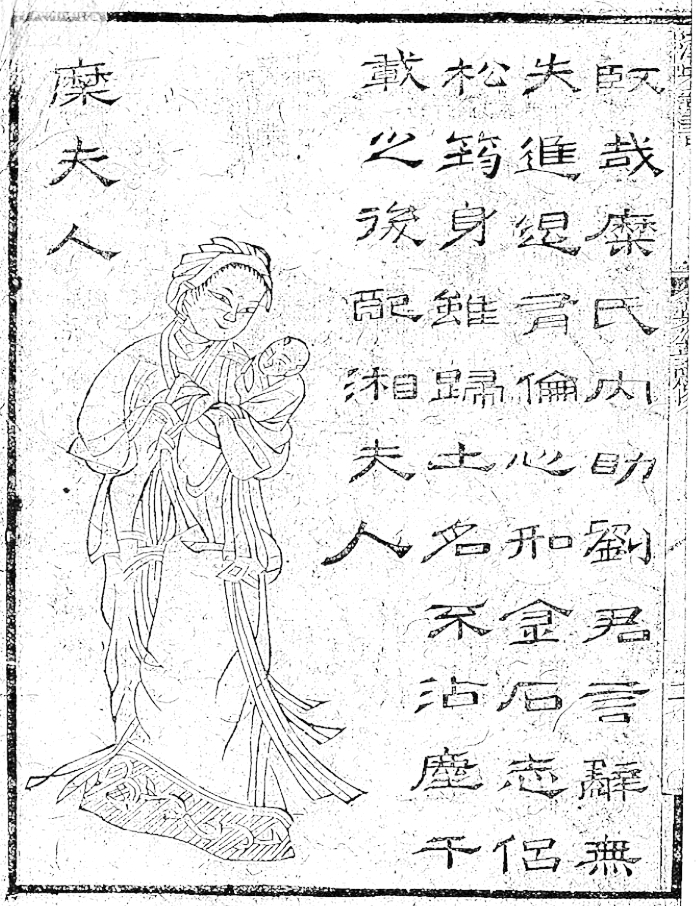
- Born: Unknown; Lianyungang, Jiangsu
- Died: Unknown
- Spouse: Liu Bei
- Relatives: Mi Zhu (brother); Mi Fang (brother)

Lady Mi (fl. 190s CE) was a younger sister of warlord Liu Bei's subordinate Mi Zhu who arranged a marriage between her and Liu Bei after Liu Bei's wife or wives and children had been captured by Lü Bu in 196 CE. Though information on her life is scarce, she is mostly remembered for sacrificing her life in the novel Romance of the Three Kingdoms at the Battle of Changban to ensure the safety of Zhao Yun and the infant Liu Shan from their pursuers.

== Life ==
Lady Mi was from Qu County (朐縣), Donghai Commandery (東海郡), which is present-day Lianyungang, Jiangsu. She had two brothers: Mi Zhu and Mi Fang from the influential and wealthy Mi clan in the Xu Province (present-day northern Jiangsu), who previously served the warlord Tao Qian. After Tao Qian's death, they supported Liu Bei to be the Governor of Xu Province and joined his side. When Lü Bu led his forces to seize Xiapi (下邳; present-day Pizhou, Jiangsu), the capital of Xu Province from Zhang Fei. Mi Zhu sponsored Liu Bei with all of his family wealth and Lady Mi become Liu Bei's first wife during his family absence. Some domestic complications must have followed, for we are told Liu Bei made peace with Lü Bu soon afterwards and his family was returned to him. Lady Mi is never referred to again.

Liu Bei's family was captured once more by Lü Bu in 198, to be again returned later, and in 200 he was obliged to abandon his dependents to Cao Cao: that group never rejoined him. Had the Lady Mi been involved in those later incidents, one might expect that she would have been mentioned, so she probably died earlier about 197.

== In Romance of the Three Kingdoms ==
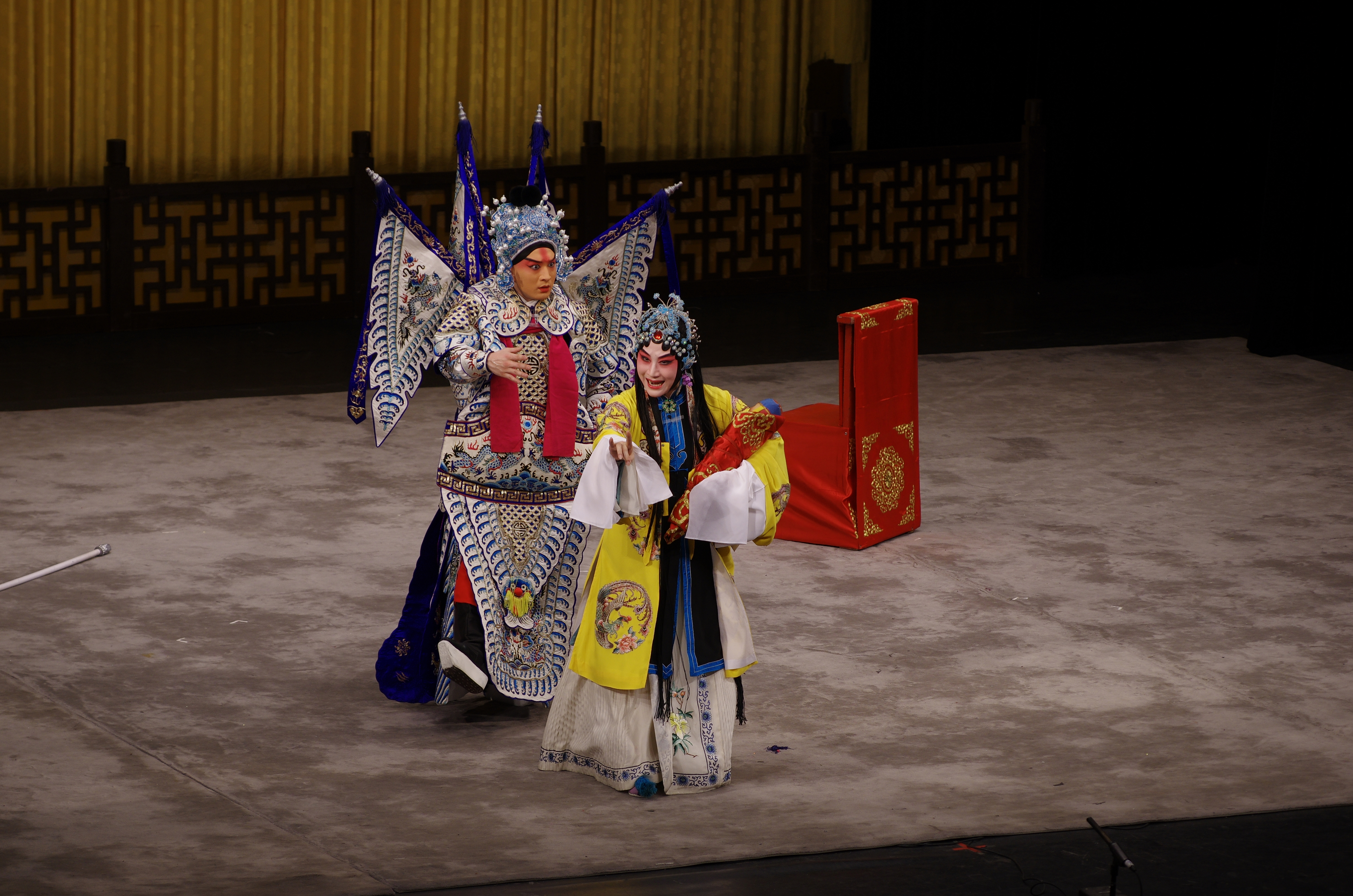
Lady Mi addressing Zhao Yun before her suicide, from a Peking opera performance by Shanghai Jingju Theatre Company on May 3, 2015, in Tianchan Theatre, Shanghai, China.

In the 14th-century historical novel Romance of the Three Kingdoms, during the Battle of Changban, Lady Mi was lost in the midst of the battle and was injured while carrying Liu Bei's infant son Liu Shan with her. Zhao Yun went to search for them and found them beside a well. Zhao urged her to follow him but she refused, not wishing to burden him. After entrusting Liu Shan to Zhao, Lady Mi committed suicide by throwing herself into the well. Zhao knocked down a wall to cover the well to prevent their pursuers from finding her body.

A poem honored her sacrifice with those lines:

The embattled captain had to have his steed;
On foot he could not save the little prince.
Her death preserved the Liu dynastic line:
For bold decision mark this heroine.

Later on, when Guan Yu met Liu Bei after they escaped with Lady Gan and saw that Lady Mi was absent, he asked his brother why he couldn't see his other sister-in-law. Liu Bei could only recount her heroic sacrifice to save Liu Shan in Dangyang. Guan Yu sighed and reproached him not going with his advice during Cao Cao's hunting expedition at the capital.

== In popular culture ==
=== Video games ===
Mei Sanniang from Kessen II is based upon Lady Mi. In the game, she is an old friend of Liu Bei, Guan Yu and Zhang Fei. She serves as a political adviser and leads a cavalry unit into battle.

== See also ==
- Shu Han family trees
- Lists of people of the Three Kingdoms
