= Empress Zhang (Liu Shan's first wife) =

Chinese Empress of Shu Han (died 237)

Empress Zhang 張皇后

Empress consort of Shu Han
- Tenure: 223 – July or August 237
- Predecessor: Empress Wu
- Successor: Empress Zhang
- Born: Unknown
- Died: July or August 237 (Note: Liu Shan's biography in the Sanguozhi recorded that Empress Zhang died in the 6th month of the 15th year of the Jianxing era of Liu Shan's reign. This month corresponds to 11 July to 8 August 237 in the Gregorian calendar.); Chengdu, Sichuan
- Spouse: Liu Shan
Posthumous name
- Empress Jing'ai (敬哀皇后)
- Father: Zhang Fei
- Mother: Unknown (Note: It is not recorded which of the daughters (the elder or the younger) of Zhang Fei was the mother of the boy that Liu Shan commented was related to Xiahou Ba.)

Empress Zhang (died July or August 237), personal name unknown, formally known as Empress Jing'ai (lit. "Respectful and Lamentable Empress"), was an empress of the state of Shu Han in the Three Kingdoms period. She was a daughter of the Shu general Zhang Fei. She married Liu Shan in 221 and became the crown princess of Shu. In 223 when Liu Bei died, Liu Shan ascended the throne of Shu, and Zhang became the empress. Her attendant Wang would catch the eye of Liu Shan and become pregnant with Shan's eldest son Liu Xuan. The Empress died in 237 and was buried in Nanling (南陵). She was succeeded by her younger sister.

In the novel Romance of the Three Kingdoms she doesn't marry Liu Shan until after he becomes Emperor, with Zhuge Liang recommending her due to her prudence.

== See also ==
- Shu Han family trees
- Lists of people of the Three Kingdoms

== Notes ==
Chinese royalty
Preceded by Empress Wu	Empress of Shu Han; 223–237	Succeeded by Empress Zhang (later)
