= Liang Mao =

Early 3rd century Chinese official serving Cao Cao

- 涼茂

Crown Prince's Grand Tutor (太子太傅)
- In office 216 or after – before 220

Zhongwei Fengchang (中尉奉常)
- In office ?–?

Supervisor of the Masters of Writing (尚書僕射)
- In office 213 – ?

Left Military Adviser (左軍師) (under Cao Pi)
- In office ? – 213

Chief Clerk (長史) (under Cao Pi)
- In office 211 – ?
- Succeeded by: Bing Yuan

Chancellor of Ganling (甘陵相)
- In office ?–?

Administrator of Wei Commandery (魏郡太守)
- In office ?–?

Administrator of Lelang Commandery (樂浪太守)
- In office before 204 – ?

Administrator of Taishan (泰山太守)
- In office after 196 – before 204
- Monarch: Emperor Xian of Han
- Chancellor: Cao Cao (from 208)

Personal details
- Born: Unknown Jinxiang County, Shandong
- Died: Unknown
- Occupation: Official
- Courtesy name: Bofang (伯方)

Liang Mao (fl. 190s – 210s), courtesy name Bofang, was a scholar and official serving under the warlord Cao Cao in the late Eastern Han dynasty of China. He spent time in the service of the far north warlord Gongsun Du and successor Kang before returning to Cao Cao's court. A respected figure, served as tutor to the heir and future Emperor Cao Pi but died before the kingdom turned into an empire.

== Early life and career ==
Liang Mao was born in Changyi County (昌邑縣), Shanyang Commandery (山陽郡), which is located northwest of present-day Jinxiang County, Shandong sometime in the late Eastern Han dynasty. Studious since childhood, he was known for being well-versed in Confucian classics as he often quoted lines from the classics to support his points during debates.

Sometime between 196 and 208, when the warlord Cao Cao held the appointment of Minister of Works (司空) in the Han imperial court, he recruited Liang Mao to serve as an assistant in his office. Later, he nominated Liang Mao as a gaodi (高第; an outstanding civil servant) and promoted him to the position of an Imperial Clerk (侍御史). At the time, as bandits were rampant in Taishan Commandery (泰山郡; around present-day Tai'an, Shandong), the Han central government appointed Liang Mao as the Administrator (太守) of Taishan Commandery. Within a month after he assumed office, thousands of families – many with young children – moved into Taishan Commandery and settled there.

== Life in Liaodong Commandery ==
The Han central government later reassigned Liang Mao to be the Administrator of Lelang Commandery (樂浪郡; around present-day Pyongyang, North Korea). At the time, the warlord Gongsun Du controlled the nearby Liaodong Commandery (遼東郡; around present-day Liaoyang, Liaoning). While Liang Mao passed by Liaodong en route to Lelang, Gongsun Du detained him in Liaodong and refused to let him go to Lelang. Liang Mao was unfazed by Gongsun Du's bold and illegal action.

Sometime in the mid 200s, Gongsun Du gathered all his subordinates and asked them, "I heard that Lord Cao is away on a campaign. Ye (around present-day Handan, Hebei) is unguarded. If I lead 30,000 infantry and 10,000 cavalry to attack Ye, can anyone stop me?" All of them agreed that Gongsun Du would succeed if he did so. After Gongsun Du sought his opinion, Liang Mao replied, "The Han Empire is in a state of chaos and on the brink of collapse. General, you command thousands of troops, yet you sit here and watch others attack and destroy each other. As a subject of the Han Empire, is this what you should be doing? Lord Cao is concerned about the Han Empire's future and the people's welfare, which is why he leads an army of righteousness to eliminate tyrants and villains. He has made immense contributions and his virtues are well-known. There is none other like him in the Han Empire. As peace and stability has just recently been restored, it is only a matter of time before everyone starts pointing fingers at you, General, for not doing anything to save the Han Empire. Now, General, you want to lead your forces west to attack Ye? All it takes is one morning to find out the result of this test of survival and destruction. General, I hope you know what is good for you." Gongsun Du's subordinates were shocked when they heard what Liang Mao said. After a long pause, Gongsun Du said, "What Administrator Liang said is correct."

The historian Pei Songzhi points out a discrepancy between the biographies of Liang Mao and Gongsun Du in the Records of the Three Kingdoms. According to Liang Mao's biography, the conversation between him and Gongsun Du took place when Cao Cao was "away on a campaign", which Pei Songzhi assumed to be referring to the Battle of White Wolf Mountain in 207. However, Gongsun Du's biography mentions that Gongsun Du died in 204, so this conversation could not have taken place if there is no error with Gongsun Du's year of death. Kenneth H. J. Gardiner dismisses the story as Wei propaganda while Rafe de Crespigny suggests the advice may have been given to Gongsun Kang instead.

== Later life and career ==
Liang Mao later left Liaodong Commandery and after that he consecutively served as the Administrator of Wei Commandery (魏郡; around present-day Ci County, Hebei) and then as the Chancellor (相) of Ganling State (甘陵國; around present-day Linqing, Shandong). He gained quite a reputation for his achievements during his tenures.

In 211, after Cao Cao's son Cao Pi was appointed as General of the Household for All Purposes (五官中郎將) in the Han central government, Liang Mao first served as his Chief Clerk (長史) and later as his Left Military Adviser (左軍師). In 213, when Emperor Xian, the figurehead Han emperor, wanted to enfeoff Cao Cao as the Duke of Wei (魏公), Cao Cao initially declined but relented after Liang Mao, listed third on the memorial, and several others urged him to accept. Liang Mao served as Supervisor of the Masters of Writing (尚書僕射) and later as zhongwei fengchang (中尉奉常) in Cao Cao's dukedom. In 216, Emperor Xian elevated Cao Cao from the status of a duke to a vassal king under the title "King of Wei" (魏王). A year later, after Cao Cao designated Cao Pi as the heir apparent to his vassal kingdom, he appointed Liang Mao as the Crown Prince's Grand Tutor (太子太傅). Cao Pi treated Liang Mao respectfully and courteously. Liang Mao died in office in an unknown year, but certainly before 220.

== Post-mortem events ==
In December 220, some months after Cao Cao's death in March that year, Cao Pi usurped the throne from Emperor Xian, ended the Eastern Han dynasty, and established the Cao Wei state with himself as the new emperor. After his coronation, Cao Pi recalled ministers who had served and died, figures he considered loyal and goodly men whose families had been neglected so he appointed one of Liang Mao's sons or grandsons as a Gentleman Cadet in recognition of Liang Mao's past service. Contemporary Wang Can said Liang Mao was considered one of the eight friends, but doesn't say who else was part of that group but is placed after Cao Pi's honouring Liang Mao. When historian Pei Songzhi commented on the way Chen Shou placed Liang Mao and other ministers together, he remarked that Zhang Fan and Guo Yuan were of good quality but slightly inferior to the great integrity of Yuan Huan, Bing Yuan and Zhang Fan.

== See also ==
- Lists of people of the Three Kingdoms
