= Liu Xiong =

2nd-century Eastern Han dynasty official

Liu Xiong (劉雄, ?-?) was an official who lived during the Eastern Han dynasty of China. He was the father of Liu Hong and grandfather of the Shu Han warlord Liu Bei (Xuande). He was said to be a descendant of Liu Bang, the founder of Han dynasty.

== Sources ==
- "Three Kingdoms, Volume Thirty-two, two books, two masters of the second biography": the male filial piety, the official to the East County Fan Ling.
- "Three Kingdoms · First Biography": " Han Jing Emperor Zhongshan Jing Wang Sheng also after. Victory son, Yuanshou six years in the county of Lucheng Pavilion Hou. Sitting on the gold lost, because of the family."
