= Li Zhaoyi (Shu Han) =

Concubine of Liu Shan of Shu Han

Li Zhaoyi 李昭儀
- Zhaoyi 昭儀
- Died: 264
- Spouse: Liu Shan
- House: Li clan
- Dynasty: Shu Han

Li Zhaoyi (李昭儀, d. 264) was a Chinese noble woman from the Shu Han state during the Three Kingdoms period. She was the concubine of the Shu Emperor Liu Shan. She was from the Li clan (李) and entered the imperial court under the office title of Zhaoyi (昭儀).

== Fall of Shu ==
In 263, the Wei general Deng Ai led a campaign to conquer the state of Shu. When Deng Ai arrived at the gates of Chengdu, the capital of Shu, where Li Zhaoyi lived, Liu Shan and the entire army surrendered to Wei. Liu Shan signed a surrender treaty and was treated cordially by Deng Ai, later Liu Shan and Empress Zhang went to Cao Wei's capital Luoyang. Li Zhaoyi remained in Chengdu and was ousted from her post.

Liu Shan's surrender caused an uproar among Shu officials, with opinions divided, many of the officials committed suicide, including Liu Shan's son Liu Chen. Li Zhaoyi felt humiliated by the surrender and showed her distaste for Cao Wei's rule. Later, the state of Wei decided to marry the women of the Shu imperial court to unmarried Wei generals. Li Zhaoyi, who had already been humiliated by losing her country to the rival state, would be humiliated again by marrying a Wei general against her will. She said "I can't be insulted again and again" and committed suicide.
