= Liu Xuan (Three Kingdoms) =

Crown Prince of Shu Han (224–264)

Liu Xuan 劉璿

Crown Prince of Shu Han
- Tenure: February 238 – December 263
- Predecessor: Liu Shan
- Born: 224
- Died: March 264 (aged 40); Chengdu, Sichuan
Names
- Family name: Liu (劉); Given name: Xuan (璿); Courtesy name: Wenheng (文衡)
- Father: Liu Shan
- Mother: Consort Wang

Liu Xuan (224 – March 264), courtesy name Wenheng, was a prince of the state of Shu Han during the Three Kingdoms period. He was the eldest son of Liu Shan, the second and last ruler of Shu. His mother was Consort Wang (王貴人), a former servant of Liu Shan's first wife Empress Jing'ai; Lady Wang later became one of Liu Shan's concubines. Liu Xuan became crown prince in c.February 238. After the fall of Shu to the rival state of Wei, Liu Xuan and his surviving brothers returned to the capital, Chengdu. In March 264, Liu Xuan was killed in Chengdu by rebelling soldiers during Zhong Hui's rebellion.

== See also ==
- Lists of people of the Three Kingdoms
- Shu Han family trees
