= Liu Feng (general) =

General and adopted son of Liu Bei (died 220)

- 劉封

Vice-General (副軍將軍)
- In office 219 – 220
- Monarch: Liu Bei (King of Hanzhong) / Emperor Xian of Han

Vice-General of the Household (副軍中郎將) (under Liu Bei)
- In office 214 – 219
- Monarch: Emperor Xian of Han

Personal details
- Born: Unknown
- Died: 220
- Children: Liu Lin
- Relatives: Liu Bei (adopted father)
- Occupation: General

Liu Feng (died 220) was an adopted son of Liu Bei, a warlord who lived in the late Eastern Han dynasty and founded the state of Shu Han in the Three Kingdoms period of China. He traced his lineage to a certain marquis whose family name was "Kou" (寇). He was also related to the House of Liu – the imperial clan of the Han dynasty from which Liu Bei descended – albeit not from a patrilineal line. He served as a general in his adoptive father's military forces.

== Life ==
Liu Feng was a descendant of the Marquis of Luo (羅侯), whose family name was Kou (寇). He was also related (but through a cognatic line) to the Liu (劉) family of Changsha (長沙; around present-day Changsha, Hunan), who descended from Liu Fa (劉發), one of Emperor Jing's sons. When Liu Bei seized control of four commanderies – Changsha, Lingling (零陵), Guiyang (桂陽), Wuling (武陵) – in southern Jing Province (covering present-day Hubei and Hunan) in 209, he adopted Liu Feng as his son because he had no suitable heir at the time. In 211, Liu Bei led an army from Jing Province to Yi Province (covering present-day Sichuan and Chongqing), ostensibly to help Yi Province's governor Liu Zhang counter a rival warlord Zhang Lu in Hanzhong Commandery. When war broke out between Liu Bei and Liu Zhang in the following year, Liu Feng, then in his early 20s and famous for his combat skills and great physical strength, led forces from Jing Province together with Liu Bei's other followers to assist his foster father in the Yi Province campaign. Liu Zhang surrendered to Liu Bei in 214, after which Yi Province came under Liu Bei's control. Liu Bei appointed Liu Feng as a Vice-General of the Household (副軍中郎將).

In 219, Liu Bei ordered his general Meng Da to lead an army from Zigui County to attack Fangling County (房陵縣; present-day Fang County, Hubei), which was defended by Kuai Qi (蒯祺). Meng Da defeated Kuai Qi in battle, conquered Fangling County, and then proceeded to attack Shangyong Commandery (上庸郡; around present-day Zhushan County, Hubei). Liu Bei was worried that Meng Da could not manage alone, so he sent Liu Feng to lead a force from Hanzhong Commandery and sail down the Mian River (沔水) to rendezvous with Meng Da at Shangyong. Shen Dan (申耽), the Administrator of Shangyong, surrendered to Meng Da and Liu Feng. For his achievement, Liu Feng was promoted to Vice-General (副軍將軍). Later that year, when Liu Bei's general Guan Yu led an army from Jing Province to attack an enemy garrison at Fan (樊; or Fancheng, present-day Fancheng District, Xiangyang, Hubei), he repeatedly asked Meng Da and Liu Feng to lead reinforcements from Shangyong to support him but they refused, claiming that the situation in Shangyong was not stable yet. Eventually, Guan Yu not only failed to conquer Fan, but also lost his lord's territories in Jing Province in a stealth invasion by Liu Bei's ally Sun Quan, who had turned against Liu. Guan Yu was captured and executed by Sun Quan's forces. Liu Bei resented Liu Feng and Meng Da for not aiding Guan Yu. At the time, Liu Feng had a quarrel with Meng Da. Meng Da became afraid when he heard of Liu Bei's anger towards him and was also worried about his dispute with Liu Feng, so he brought along his followers and defected to the state of Cao Wei, which was established by Liu Bei's rival Cao Pi.

After defecting to Wei, Meng Da wrote a letter to Liu Feng, in which he attempted to persuade Liu Feng to join him by noting two important points: Liu Bei already had other sons at the time so he no longer regarded Liu Feng as highly as before; the Wei imperial court was willing to allow Liu Feng to inherit the Luo marquisate which belonged to his biological family. Liu Feng ignored Meng Da's advice and returned to his foster father. Liu Bei reproached his adoptive son for not helping Guan Yu and blamed him for Meng Da's defection. Liu Bei's chancellor, Zhuge Liang pointed out Liu Feng's martial prowess and expressed worries that Liu Feng might become a threat to them if he switched his allegiance to their enemies, hence he urged his lord to eliminate Liu Feng. Liu Bei eventually condemned Liu Feng to death but permitted him to take his own life. Before committing suicide, Liu Feng said, "I regret not listening to Meng Zidu! (Note: Given Meng Da's original courtesy name of "Zijing", "Zidu" was likely Meng Da's new courtesy name.)" Liu Bei shed tears after Liu Feng died.

Liu Feng's son, Liu Lin (劉林), was appointed as an Officer of the Standard (牙門將) and served in the state of Shu Han – founded by Liu Bei in 221 – in the Three Kingdoms period throughout the reign of Liu Bei's eldest son and successor, Liu Shan. In 264, after the fall of Shu, Liu Lin was ordered to move out of former Shu territory to Hedong Commandery.

== In Romance of the Three Kingdoms ==
Portrait of Liu Feng as a Peking opera character, from the Metropolitan Museum of Art collection

In the historical novel Romance of the Three Kingdoms by Luo Guanzhong, Liu Feng was adopted after Liu Shan was born, which proved controversial because Liu Bei already had a biological son at the time who was far younger than Liu Feng. Guan Yu, in particular, voiced his opposition, citing the family feud between Liu Biao's sons. However, Liu Feng showed his worth in battle and proved to be a valuable asset to his foster father.

In 219, when Guan Yu was being surrounded by Sun Quan's forces in Maicheng (麥城), Liu Feng refused to provide reinforcements partly because Meng Da reminded Liu Feng of Guan Yu's disapproval. When the general Liao Hua told Liu Bei that Guan Yu died because Liu Feng and Meng Da did not send reinforcements, Liu Bei began to resent the two and even plotted their arrest. Meng Da became afraid and defected to the state of Cao Wei and sent Liu Feng a message, urging him to defect as well. In anger, Liu Feng executed the messenger and went to battle Meng Da, who was now aided by the Wei generals Xu Huang and Xiahou Shang. As Liu Feng was out of the city, the defender Shen Dan surrendered to Wei and shot arrows at Liu Feng's men. Defeated, Liu Feng returned to Chengdu with only slightly more than a hundred horsemen.

Liu Feng sought an interview with Liu Bei, but gained scant sympathy. In response to Liu Feng's petition, Liu Bei instructed the executioners to expel Liu Feng and put him to death. Liu Bei felt some regret later when he heard of Liu Feng's staunch rejection of Meng Da's enticement. This, adding to the recent death of Guan Yu, made Liu Bei grieve until he fell sick.

== See also ==
- Shu Han family trees
- Lists of people of the Three Kingdoms
