= Lady Gan =

Liu Bei's concubine and Liu Shan's mother (died c. 210)

Lady Gan 甘夫人
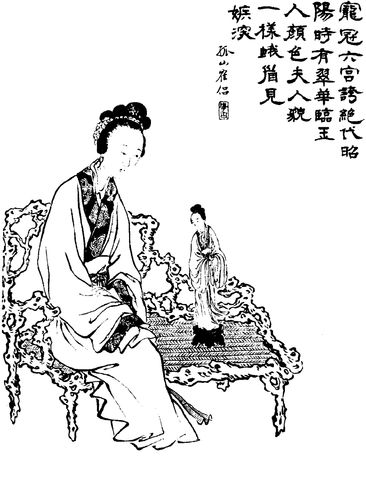
- A Qing dynasty illustration of Lady Gan
- Born: Pei County, Jiangsu
- Died: c. 210; Gong'an County, Hubei
- Burial: Jingzhou, Hubei
- Spouse: Liu Bei
- Issue: Liu Shan
Posthumous name
- Lady Huangsi (皇思夫人); Empress Zhaolie (昭烈皇后)

Lady Gan (died c. 210) was a concubine of Liu Bei, the founding emperor of the state of Shu Han in the Three Kingdoms period of China and Liu Shan's mother. She was later posthumously honoured as Lady Huangsi which means "the Lady whom the Emperor misses" by Liu Bei; after his death, she was named Empress Zhaolie by her son to match his father's posthumous title. In the Gazette of Kuizhou Prefecture (夔州府志) compiled in 1513, her name is given as Gan Mei (甘梅), though the compiler deems the name fictitious.

== Life ==
Lady Gan was born to a family of commoners from Pei (沛), which is in present-day Pei County, Jiangsu) though a diviner predicted a bright future in store for her. When Lady Gan entered adulthood, her appearance became striking. And by the time she turned eighteen, she had already matured into a seductive and bewitching beauty. She had a beautiful body and soft flesh. When Liu Bei visited Xu Province, he stayed in Xiaopei (小沛; present-day Pei County, Jiangsu), where he met Lady Gan and took her as his concubine. Whenever Liu Bei would summon her within the silken curtains, she would look to anyone who gazed upon her from outside the window as if she was like drifted snow beneath the Moon.

Liu Bei had a three-foot-tall jade figurine that he kept in Lady Gan's apartment. He was reputed to have spent his days planning military strategies, retreating to the apartment at night: It is said that Lady Gan's body was as white and sleek as the jade figurine and that it was difficult to tell them apart. Realizing that Liu Bei's other concubines were extremely jealous of her and the jade figurine, Lady Gan wisely admonished Liu Bei for cherishing such a bewitching trifle, telling him that infatuation gives rise to suspicion. He heeded her warning and disposed of the jade figurine.

Since Liu Bei lost several wives during this time, Lady Gan was in charge of family affairs. On several occasions, she was captured by Liu Bei’s enemies but always managed to emerge from the experience unharmed, and she succeeded in keeping his household together through such crises. Because of her leading role in the household, a common misinterpretation is that she was Liu Bei's first wife. However, though he liked her and trusted her, Liu Bei never married her as a formal wife. This was probably because he wanted a formal wife who would bring him some political advantage; Liu Bei's three known wives were all from powerful clans in the region he was at: Lady Mi in Xu Province, Lady Sun in Eastern Wu and Empress Wu in Yi Province.

She followed Liu Bei to Jing Province later, where she gave birth to Liu Shan. During the Battle of Changban, Liu Bei was forced to abandon her and Liu Shan, but she and her son were both saved by Zhao Yun. She was buried in Nan Commandery (around present-day Jingzhou, Hubei), her death probably was what prompted the offer of marriage between Liu Bei and Lady Sun, since Liu Bei no longer had someone to manage his household or raise his son.

== Posthumous honours ==
In 221, after Liu Bei established the state of Shu Han and became its first emperor, he posthumously honoured Lady Gan as "Lady Huangsi" (皇思夫人), which literally means "the Lady whom the Emperor misses". Lady Gan's remains were excavated from Nan Commandery for reburial in Shu territory (covering present-day Sichuan and Chongqing), but Liu Bei died before this was completed.

Later, after Liu Shan succeeded his father, Liu Bei, as the emperor of Shu, the chancellor Zhuge Liang wrote a memorial to Liu Shan, suggesting that Lady Gan be honoured and buried together with Liu Bei. Liu Shan obliged and posthumously honoured his mother as "Empress Zhaolie" (昭烈皇后) to match his father's posthumous title, "Emperor Zhaolie".

== In Romance of the Three Kingdoms ==
Lady Gan first appears in Chapter 15 of the novel alongside Liu Bei's other consort Lady Mi. The two of them had been treated well by Lü Bu who sought to maintain his alliance with their husband. They were also used as a bartering chip to ensure Guan Yu's loyalty to Cao Cao. Lady Gan urged her brother-in-law to escape upon hearing news of Liu Bei's whereabouts. She also provided him with numerous pieces of advice during the journey, even helping pacify Zhang Fei who mistook his brother's ties to Cao Cao as treachery.

After reuniting with her husband, Lady Gan, bore him a son, Liu Shan. On the night of the birth a white crane alighted on the yamen, sang some forty notes (number of years her son would reign), and flew into the west (place he would reign). During parturition an unknown fragrance filled the room. Once Lady Gan had dreamed that she swallowed the stars of the Northern Dipper and conceived as a result—hence the child's milkname, Ah Dou, or Precious Dipper. She was among those Zhao Yun saved when the conflict at Changban occurred. Her death in Chapter 54 inspired Zhou Yu to entrap Liu Bei in Wu by arranging a marriage between him and Lady Sun.

== See also ==
- Shu Han family trees
- Lists of people of the Three Kingdoms
