= Battle of Changban =

Battle between warlords Cao Cao and Liu Bei (208)

Coordinates: 32.0450°N 112.1360°E

- Part of the Red Cliffs campaign
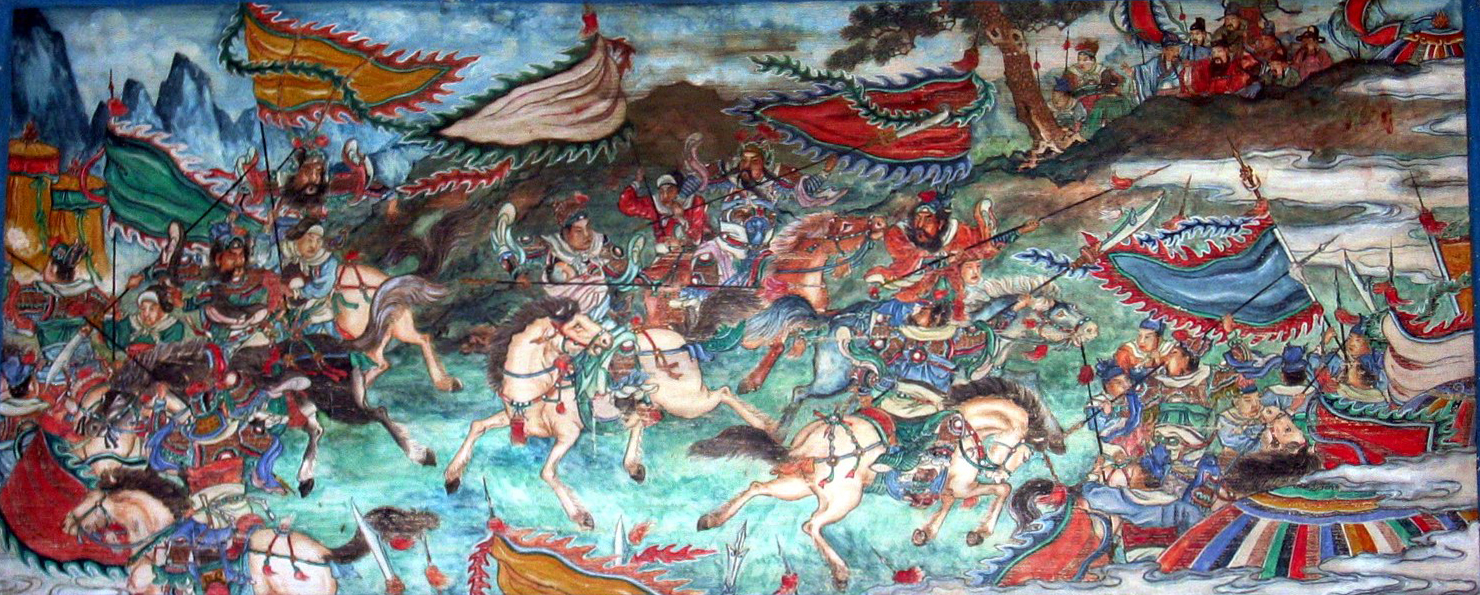
- The painting "Zhao Yun's Fight at Changban" inside the Long Corridor on the grounds of the Summer Palace in Beijing
Date	c. October 208
Location	Changban, Dangyang, Jing Province (south of present-day Duodao District, Jingmen, Hubei)
Result	Cao Cao victory Liu Bei evacuated to Xiakou

Belligerents
Forces of Cao Cao	Forces of Liu Bei; Forces of Liu Qi

Commanders and leaders
Cao Cao; Cao Chun	Liu Bei; Liu Qi; Guan Yu; Zhang Fei; Zhuge Liang; Zhao Yun

Strength
5,000 elite cavalry	2,000–10,000 infantry 100,000 mostly unarmed civilians

Battle of Changban
- Traditional Chinese: 長坂之戰
- Simplified Chinese: 长坂之战
Transcriptions
Standard Mandarin
- Hanyu Pinyin: Chángbǎn zhī zhàn

The Battle of Changban was fought between the warlords Cao Cao and Liu Bei in October 208 in the late Eastern Han dynasty of China. The battle took place at Changban (長坂; south of present-day Duodao District, Jingmen, Hubei).

== Background ==
After Cao Cao unified northern China under his control in 207, he made arrangements for a southern campaign on Jing Province (covering present-day Hubei and Hunan), which was governed by Liu Biao at the time. Initial minor invasions led by Xiahou Dun were repelled by Liu Biao's vassal Liu Bei, whose forces were stationed at Xinye County at the northern border of Jing Province. Following that, Cao Cao personally led his armies south to attack Jing Province in August 208.

Around late August or September, when Cao Cao's forces had reached Wancheng (宛城; in present-day Nanyang, Henan), Liu Biao died of illness and was succeeded by his younger son, Liu Cong. Liu Cong's advisers Kuai Yue and Fu Xun convinced Liu Cong that he could not resist Cao Cao even with Liu Bei's help, so Liu Cong agreed to surrender. Liu Bei, who was at Fancheng at the time, was not informed of Liu Cong's decision to surrender. When Liu Bei became suspicious, he sent an attendant to Xiangyang to question Liu Cong, and only then would Liu Cong pass the news to Liu Bei through his subordinate Song Zhong (宋忠). Dismayed, Liu Bei drew his sword on Song Zhong, but did not kill him.

Liu Bei then called for a council of his advisors. Zhuge Liang suggested that Liu Bei should attack Liu Cong to secure Jing Province and defend against Cao Cao there, but Liu Bei rejected this and said, "as Liu Biao was dying, he entrusted his orphans to me. I cannot turn from this obligation and seek my own advantage. How am I to face Liu Biao after I die?". Not willing to fall into the hands of Cao Cao, Liu Bei gathered his men and marched southward. As he passed Xiangyang he called out to Liu Cong, but Liu Cong dared not see him and hid. Many officials and civilians of Xiangyang followed Liu Bei as he left, as he was greatly respected by the people.

Between 28 September and 26 October 208, Liu Cong set out from Xiangyang towards Xinye to receive Cao Cao, surrendering Jing Province. Cao Cao took command of Jing Province's military, especially its naval fleet, a component which Cao Cao's forces lacked. Fearing that Liu Bei would take the strategic Jiangling County in the south, Cao Cao swiftly gave chase to Liu Bei with a 5,000-strong elite cavalry force, leaving his baggage behind. As Liu Bei was bringing along more than 100,000 unarmed people and thousands of carts of luggage, his force could not move very quickly. Someone suggested to Liu Bei that he should abandon the people for his safety, but Liu Bei did not have the heart to desert them when the people risked their own lives to follow him. Instead, Liu Bei had Guan Yu sail ahead down the Han River with a detachment of several hundred ships and take a roundabout route to Jiangling, where they planned to rendezvous.

== Battle ==
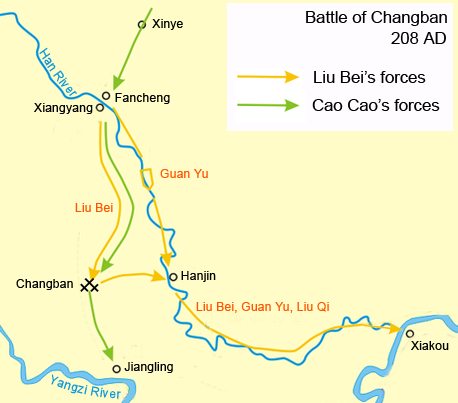
Map of the battle

Cao Cao and his cavalry caught up with Liu Bei's congregation at Changban, Dangyang, and Liu Bei had to flee for his life, galloping south with Zhang Fei, Zhao Yun, and Zhuge Liang, while leaving his family and the populace behind. Cao Cao's forces captured most of the unarmed civilians and Liu Bei's baggage. Xu Shu, a friend of Zhuge Liang who was also serving Liu Bei at the time, requested leave from Liu Bei and left to serve Cao Cao after learning that his mother had been captured by Cao Cao's forces. Cao Cao's subordinate Cao Chun also captured Liu Bei's two daughters during the battle.

Zhang Fei commanded 20 horsemen as rearguard. He sent his troops into a nearby wooded area and had them move about frenetically as though their number was greater than it actually was. He then stood at the bridge; looking fierce and shaking his lance, he shouted: "I am Zhang Yide. Come and battle me to the death!" (Yide was Zhang Fei's courtesy name). Believing there was an ambush in the woods behind Zhang Fei, none of Cao Cao's men dared to go near him. Zhang Fei and his troops then crossed the bridges and destroyed them. While this bought some time for Liu Bei to escape, it also allowed Cao Cao's men to realize that there was no ambush at all and resume their pursuit.

As Zhang Fei retreated with Liu Bei, Cao Cao ordered his men to build pontoon bridges and launch an assault, but a timely arrival of Guan Yu and his forces prevented Cao Cao from fully attaining victory.

In the chaos, Zhao Yun disappeared to the north, prompting suspicion that he had surrendered to Cao Cao. When someone reported that to Liu Bei, Liu Bei angrily threw a ji and said "Zilong (Zhao Yun's courtesy name) would never desert me." Surely enough, Zhao Yun came back with Liu Bei's infant son Liu Shan along with Lady Gan. With this, Zhao Yun was promoted to General of the Standard (牙門將軍).

Turning east from Changban, Liu Bei and the remnants of his party had crossed the Han River to the east where Liu Qi, Liu Biao's elder son, still held control of Jiangxia Commandery. They met Guan Yu's fleet and over 10,000 men led by Liu Qi at Han Ford (漢津). Together, they sailed down the river to Xiakou (in present-day Wuhan, Hubei.)

Cao Cao did not follow up in immediate pursuit. The main objective of his drive to the south had been the base at Jiangling County, and he pressed on south to secure that base first.

== Aftermath ==
After the Battle of Changban, the land of Jing Province west of the Han River became territories of Cao Cao. Cao Cao entered Jiangling County and pacified the officials and peasants there. Cao Cao's advisor Jia Xu suggested that Cao Cao should make full use of the resources in Jing Province to settle his troops before further territorial expansions, but Cao Cao preferred to use the momentum from his victories to attack the Jiangdong (or Wu) region next.

Lu Su, an adviser to the Jiangdong warlord Sun Quan, was originally on a mission to offer condolences for Liu Biao's death. By the time he reached Jing Province, however, Liu Cong had already surrendered and Liu Bei had fled south. Lu Su went to see Liu Bei at Changban and, after Liu Bei's defeat, followed him to Xiakou. There he asked where Liu Bei was heading after, and Liu Bei replied that he plans to take refuge under Wu Ju (吳巨), an old friend, in the distant Cangwu Commandery (east of present-day Guangxi). To this, Lu Su dissuaded Liu Bei from joining Wu Ju, saying Wu Ju was only an ordinary fellow who would not be independent for long; and persuaded Liu Bei to form an alliance with his lord Sun Quan against Cao Cao. Liu Bei was pleased at this suggestion, and sent Zhuge Liang to follow Lu Su back to meet Sun Quan and secure the alliance.

The successful formation of the Sun-Liu alliance led to the Battle of Red Cliffs shortly after in the same year, where the allied forces defeated Cao Cao's overwhelming fleet, driving him back north and forming the basis of the Three Kingdoms.

== In Romance of the Three Kingdoms ==
In the 14th-century historical novel Romance of the Three Kingdoms, the battle is romanticised into a showcase of the power and bravery of Zhang Fei and Zhao Yun.

Liu Bei's wife Lady Mi and infant son A'dou (Liu Shan) are isolated from the rest during an attack by Cao Cao and his cavalry. Zhao Yun braves danger by fighting his way through enemy lines in search of Lady Mi and A'dou. He encounters the enemy general Xiahou En, defeats him and takes Cao Cao's prized Qinggang Sword that could cut through armour from him. When Zhao Yun finally finds Lady Mi and A'dou beside a well, he urges them to mount his horse quickly, but Lady Mi refuses as she does not want to be a burden to Zhao Yun. She entrusts A'dou to Zhao Yun and commits suicide by throwing herself into the well. Zhao Yun then straps A'dou to his body and fights his way out against overwhelming numbers of enemy forces, bringing A'dou safely back to Liu Bei.

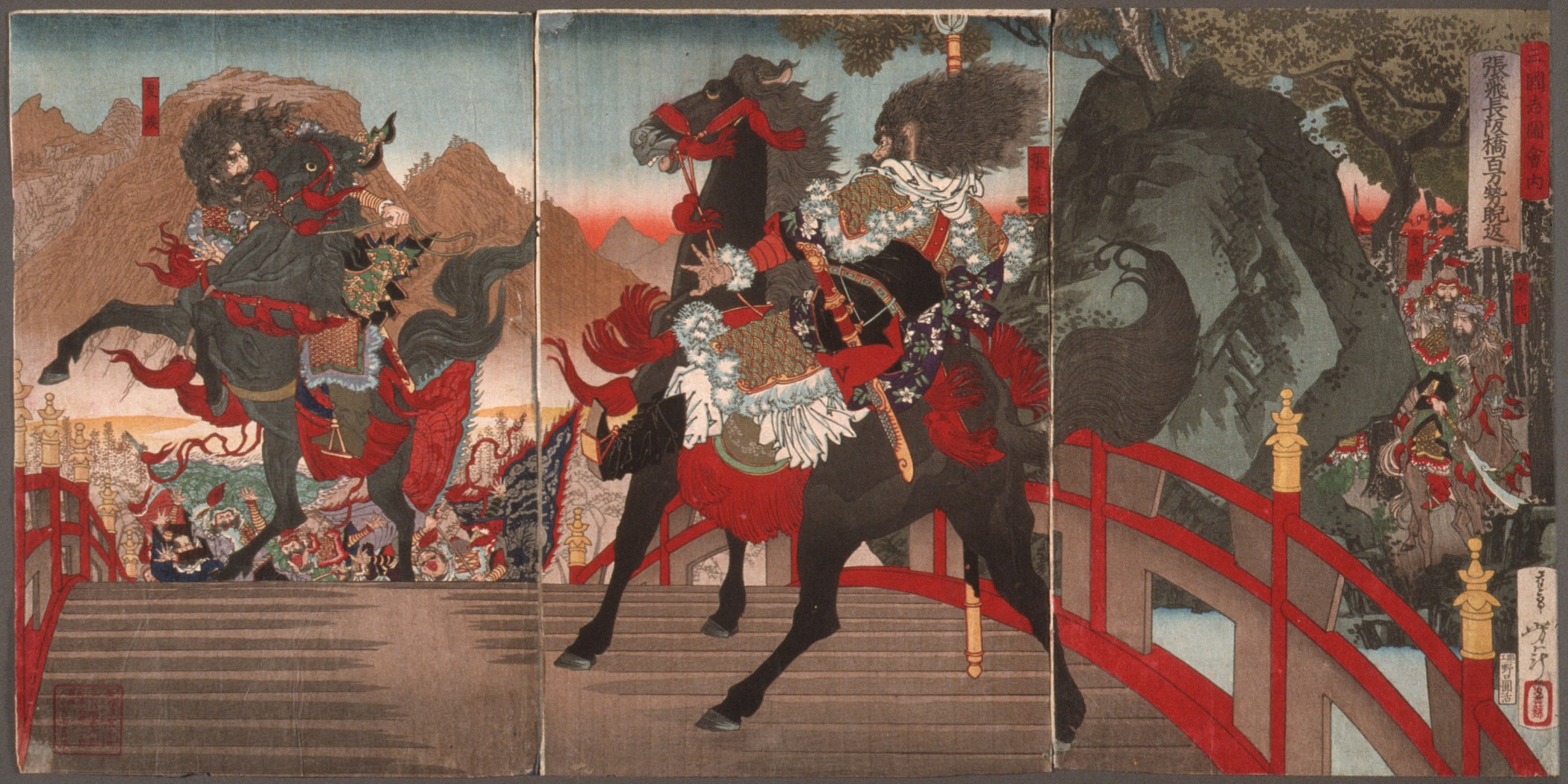
"Zhang Fei on Changban Bridge" (三国志図会内 張飛長阪橋百万勢睨返ス, an ukiyo-e print by Tsukioka Yoshitoshi)

Cao Cao's forces pursue Zhao Yun until they arrive at Changban Bridge, where Zhang Fei stands guard alone. Zhang Fei bellows a challenge at the enemy and shocks Xiahou Jie to death. Cao Cao's soldiers also observe that the woods behind Zhang Fei are clouded in dust and believe that there is an ambush, so they retreat without a fight and Zhang Fei destroys the bridge and retreats as well. Zhang Fei had earlier ordered his men to tie tree branches to the tails of their horses and ride around in the woods, churning up dust to create an illusion of an ambush.

By then, Zhao Yun has returned with A'dou to his father safely. When he presented A'dou to Liu Bei, the warlord throws his infant son to the ground and exclaims that his son had nearly cost him one of his best warriors. Zhao Yun catches A'dou in time and reaffirms his allegiance to Liu Bei, pledging to serve his lord with his life and he does so, serving him until A'dou succeeds his father later.

=== Historicity ===
Zhao Yun's biography in the Sanguozhi briefly stated that during the Battle of Changban, after Liu Bei abandoned his family and fled, Zhao Yun protected A'dou (carrying A'dou close to him) and Lady Gan and escorted them to safety. Both Lady Gan and Lady Mi also survived the battle. Zhang Fei's biography also briefly mentioned that Zhang Fei remained behind with 20 horsemen to block Cao Cao's pursuing forces. The bridge was already destroyed when Zhang Fei bellowed a challenge, similar in tone to the one in the novel, but without the highly exaggerated effect on the enemy. Cao Cao's men did not dare to come near and Zhang Fei was safe. Xiahou En and Xiahou Jie are fictional characters.

== In popular culture ==
The Battle of Changban is the highlight of Zhao Yun's and Zhang Fei's story mode in Koei's video game series Dynasty Warriors.

The battle is also featured in the 2008–2009 two-part epic film Red Cliff.
