= Liu Chen (Shu Han) =

Chinese prince (died 263)

Liu Chen 劉諶
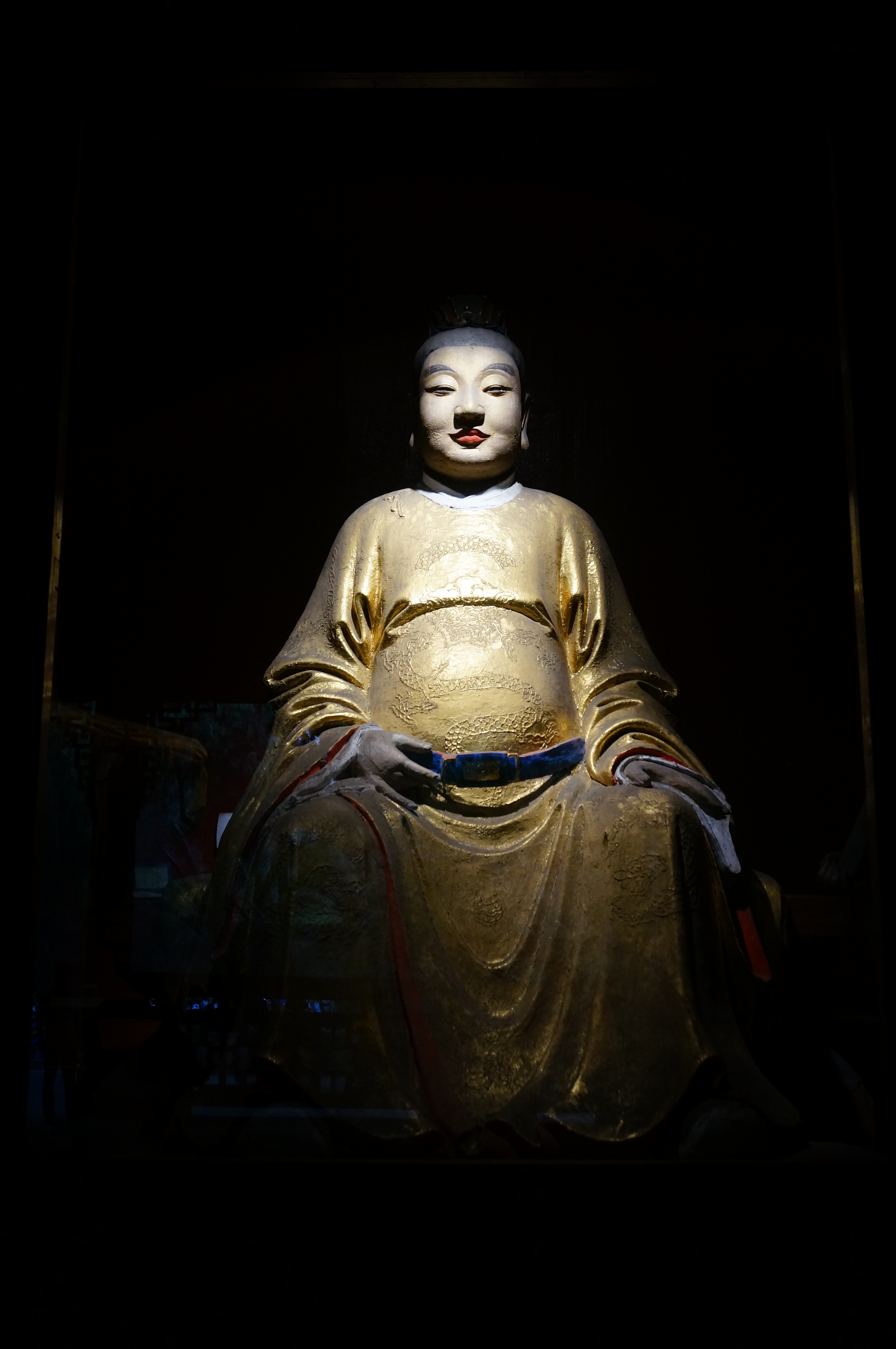
- Statue of Liu Chen in the Temple of Marquis Wu in Chengdu, Sichuan

Prince of Beidi (北地王)
- Tenure: July 259 – December 263
- Born: Unknown
- Died: December 263 (Note: Cao Huan's biography in the Sanguozhi recorded that Liu Shan surrendered to Deng Ai in the 11th month of the 4th year of the Jingyuan era of Cao Huan's reign. This month corresponds to 18 December 263 to 15 January 264 in the Julian and proleptic Gregorian calendars. Liu Shan's biography in the Sanguozhi also recorded that Liu Chen killed his wife and children before committing suicide on the same day his father surrendered. Based on these records, Liu Chen died in December 263.); Chengdu, Sichuan
- Father: Liu Shan

Liu Chen (simplified Chinese: 刘谌; traditional Chinese: 劉諶; pinyin: Liú Chén; died December 263), the Prince of Beidi (北地王), was the fifth son of Liu Shan, the second ruler of the state of Shu Han during the Three Kingdoms period of China. Liu Chen opposed the plans of Qiao Zhou to surrender to the opposing force under general Deng Ai from the rival state of Cao Wei. Liu Chen attempted to convince his father to fight for the honour of Shu, so Liu Bei (the founder of Shu) could look upon him as a redeemed ruler of Shu. However, Liu Shan threw Liu Chen out of the court for this. He then went to Liu Bei's ancestral temple and killed his wife and children before committing suicide.

Liu Chen is depicted in the Wu Shuang Pu (無雙譜, Table of Peerless Heroes) by Jin Guliang.

Liu Chen's story is reenacted in a play of the Yue opera.

== See also ==
- Shu Han family trees
- Lists of people of the Three Kingdoms
