= Liu Yong (Three Kingdoms) =

3rd century imperial prince of the Shu Han state

Liu Yong 劉永

Prince of Ganling (甘陵王)
- Tenure: 230–263

Prince of Lu (魯王)
- Tenure: July 221 – 230
- Born: between 207 and 221
- Died: Unknown
Names
- Family name: Liu (劉); Given name: Yong (永); Courtesy name: Gongshou (公壽)
- House: House of Liu
- Father: Liu Bei

Liu Yong (fl.221-264), courtesy name Gongshou, was an imperial prince of the state of Shu Han in the Three Kingdoms period of China. He was a son of Liu Bei, the founding emperor of Shu Han, and a younger half-brother of Liu Shan, the second Shu Han emperor.

== Life ==
Liu Yong was born in an unknown year. His father, Liu Bei, was a warlord of the late Eastern Han dynasty who became the founding emperor of the state of Shu Han in the Three Kingdoms period. His mother was one of Liu Bei's concubines. He was a younger half-brother of Liu Shan, Liu Bei's successor and the second emperor of Shu.

Sometime in July 221, about three months after Liu Bei became emperor, he sent Xu Jing, the Minister over the Masses, as an emissary to read out an imperial edict and grant Liu Yong the title "Prince of Lu" (魯王).

In 230, during Liu Shan's reign, Liu Yong's title was changed to "Prince of Ganling" (甘陵王). Liu Yong hated the eunuch Huang Hao, whom Liu Shan highly trusted and favoured. After Huang Hao came to power, he frequently spoke ill of Liu Yong in front of Liu Shan, resulting in Liu Shan giving Liu Yong the cold shoulder and refusing to meet him for over 10 years.

In 264, the following year after Shu was conquered by its rival state, Wei, Liu Yong moved to Luoyang, the Wei imperial capital. The Wei government appointed him as a Commandant of Equipage (奉車都尉) and enfeoffed him as a district marquis (鄉侯). It is not known when Liu Yong died.

Liu Yong had a grandson, Liu Xuan (劉玄; fl.307 - 347), who survived the Disaster of Yongjia in 311. In his Shu Shi Pu, Sun Sheng indicated that he met Liu Xuan in Chengdu during Huan Wen's expedition against Li Shi (Note: the last ruler of the Cheng-Han regime) in 347 (Note: 3rd year of the Yonghe era during the reign of Emperor Mu of Jin). Sun claimed that Li Xiong, founder of the Cheng-Han regime, created Liu Xuan as his Duke of Anle, after Liu fled to Shu during the chaos of the Yongjia era.

== See also ==
- Lists of people of the Three Kingdoms
- Shu Han family trees
