= Liu Shan =

Emperor of Shu Han from 223 to 263

Liu Shan 劉禪
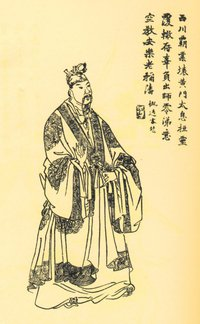
- A Qing dynasty illustration of Liu Shan

Emperor of Shu Han
- Reign: June 223 – December 263
- Predecessor: Liu Bei
- Regent: Zhuge Liang; Jiang Wan; Fei Yi; Jiang Wei

Crown Prince of Shu Han
- Tenure: 19 June 221 – June 223
- Successor: Liu Xuan

Duke of Anle (安樂公)
- Tenure: 264–271
- Born: 207; Xinye County, Henan
- Died: 271 (aged 64); Luoyang, Henan
- Spouse: Empress Jing'ai; Empress Zhang; Lady Li; Consort Wang
- Issue Detail: Crown Prince Liu Xuan; Liu Yao; Liu Cong; Liu Zan; Liu Chen, Prince of Beidi; Liu Xun; Liu Qian
Names
- Family name: Liu (劉); Given name: Shan (禪); Courtesy name: Gongsi (公嗣)
Era dates
- Jianxing (建興; 223–237); Yanxi (延熙; 238–257); Jingyao (景耀; 258–263); Yanxing (炎興; 263)
Posthumous name
- Duke Si of Anle (安樂思公); Emperor Xiaohuai (孝懷皇帝)
- House: House of Liu
- Dynasty: Shu Han
- Father: Liu Bei
- Mother: Empress Zhaolie

Liu Shan
- Traditional Chinese: 劉禪
- Simplified Chinese: 刘禅
Transcriptions
Standard Mandarin
- Hanyu Pinyin: Líu Shàn
- Wade–Giles: Liu Shan

Liu Shan (207–271), (Note: Liu Shan's name is commonly mispronounced as "Liu Chan". See Lü Youren (吕友仁) (1988). 阿斗的大名怎样读 [How to pronounce Adou's name]. Zhonghua Shuju Wenshi Zhishi 中华书局《文史知识》. No. 11. Archived from the original on November 29, 2006. In addition, when combined with his adopted brother Liu Feng's name, the two men's names formed the term "Feng Shan".) courtesy name Gongsi, was the second and last emperor of the state of Shu Han during the Three Kingdoms period. As he ascended the throne at the age of 16, Liu Shan was entrusted to the care of the Chancellor Zhuge Liang and Imperial Secretariat Li Yan. His reign of 40 years was the longest of all emperors in the Three Kingdoms era. (Note: Sun Quan ruled his state for 52 years (200–252). However, he only declared himself emperor in 229, and was emperor for 23 years.) During Liu Shan's reign, many campaigns were led against the rival state of Cao Wei, primarily by Zhuge Liang and his successor Jiang Wei, but to little avail, due to their drastic mismatch in terms of population and geographic extent. Liu Shan eventually surrendered to Wei in 263 after Deng Ai led a surprise attack on the Shu capital Chengdu. He was quickly relocated to the Wei capital at Luoyang, and enfeoffed as "Duke Anle". There he enjoyed his last years peacefully before dying in 271, most probably of natural causes.

Widely known to later generations by his infant name "Adou" (阿斗), Liu Shan was commonly perceived as an incapable ruler. He was also accused of indulging in pleasures while neglecting state affairs, allowing corrupt officials to take power. Some modern scholars have taken a more positive view towards Liu Shan's capability, as Liu Shan's long reign in Shu Han was free of bloody court coups unlike its rivals. Nevertheless, the name "Adou" is today still commonly used in Chinese as an epithet for someone so incompetent at a task that no amount of assistance will help them succeed.

The main source of historical information about Liu Shan and his contemporaries is Records of the Three Kingdoms. Its author Chen Shou noted in his postface that Zhuge Liang did not employ scribes at Liu Shan's court, contrary to tradition. This custom would never be established in Shu Han, so details of Liu Shan's rule are hazy in comparison to the richness of information available for Shu's rival states of Wei and Wu. Much of his reign is recorded in spare, terse synopsis.

== Early life ==
Liu Shan was the eldest son of the warlord Liu Bei and was born to Liu Bei's concubine Lady Gan. In 208, Liu Bei's rival Cao Cao, who had by then occupied most of northern China, launched a campaign on Jing Province. During his retreat south, Liu Bei was caught up by an elite cavalry force led by Cao Cao at the Battle of Changban, and forced to leave behind Lady Gan and Liu Shan to resume his escape. Liu Bei's general Zhao Yun stayed behind to protect the family members of Liu Bei. Holding the infant Liu Shan in his arms, Zhao Yun led the mother and child to safety. (Note: It appears likely that Lady Gan had died sometime before 209, because when Liu Bei's wife Lady Sun effectively divorced Liu Bei in 211, Liu Shan was in her custody.)

An alternative story of Liu Shan's early life was given in Yu Huan's Weilüe. It was said that Liu Shan, then already several years old, was separated from Liu Bei when the latter was attacked by Cao Cao in Xiaopei in 200. He somehow landed in Hanzhong and was sold by slave traders. Only when Liu Bei declared himself emperor in 221 was Liu Shan reunited with his father. Pei Songzhi included this account in his Annotated Records of the Three Kingdoms but refused to give it any credence.

After Liu Bei declared himself emperor of Shu Han in 221, Liu Shan was formally made the crown prince. In the following year, Liu Bei left the capital Chengdu on a campaign against Sun Quan, who had sent his general Lü Meng to invade and seize Jing Province from Liu Bei in 219. Liu Bei was defeated at the Battle of Xiaoting and, having retreated to the city of Baidicheng, eventually died in 223. Before his death, Liu Bei entrusted the young Liu Shan to the care of his chancellor Zhuge Liang. Liu Bei made an ambiguous deathbed statement to Zhuge Liang about the possibility of Liu Shan's fitness to rule. The statement meant at minimum that Zhuge Liang was empowered to replace Liu Shan if the crown prince proved incapable, and may have indicated permission for Zhuge Liang to take the throne himself.

== Reign ==
=== Zhuge Liang's regency ===
While Zhuge Liang was alive, Liu Shan treated him as a father figure, allowing Zhuge to handle all state affairs. Zhuge Liang recommended many trusted officials, including Fei Yi, Dong Yun, Guo Youzhi and Xiang Chong into key positions. Under Zhuge Liang's advice, Liu Shan entered into an alliance with the state of Eastern Wu, helping both states to survive against the much larger state of Cao Wei. During Zhuge Liang's regency, the government was largely efficient and not corrupt, allowing the relatively small state of Shu to prepare itself for military campaigns.

In 223, Liu Shan married Zhang Fei's daughter, Empress Zhang.

In the aftermath of Liu Bei's death, the southern Nanman tribes had peeled away from Shu dominion. In 225, Zhuge Liang headed south and was able to, by both military victories and persuasion, reintegrate the southern region into the empire. For the rest of Zhuge Liang's regency, the southern Nanman people would be key contributors to Shu's campaigns against Wei.

Starting in 227, Zhuge Liang launched his five Northern Expeditions against Wei. All but one were modest military failures, with the Shu forces exhausting their provisions before they were able to inflict significant damage on Wei. On one expedition in 231, Zhuge Liang faced a political crisis. Unable to supply the troops sufficiently, Zhuge Liang's co-regent Li Yan forged an edict by Liu Shan, ordering Zhuge Liang to retreat. When Zhuge Liang discovered this, he recommended that Li Yan be removed from his office and put under house arrest, and Liu Shan accepted the recommendation.

In 234, while Zhuge Liang was on his final campaign against Wei, he grew seriously ill. Hearing about Zhuge's illness, Liu Shan sent his secretary Li Fu (李福) to the front line to visit Zhuge Liang and request instructions on important state matters. Among other things, Zhuge Liang recommended that Jiang Wan succeed him, and that Fei Yi succeed Jiang Wan. Zhuge Liang refused to answer Li Fu's next question — who should succeed Fei Yi. Zhuge Liang died soon thereafter. Liu Shan followed these recommendations, installing Jiang Wan as the new regent.

=== Jiang Wan's regency ===
Jiang Wan was a capable administrator, and he continued Zhuge Liang's domestic policies, leaving the government largely efficient. He was also known for his tolerance of dissension and his humility. Not having much military aptitude, however, he soon abandoned Zhuge Liang's aggressive foreign policy towards Wei, and indeed in 241 withdrew most of the troops from the important border city of Hanzhong to Fu County (涪縣; in present-day Mianyang, Sichuan). From that point on, Shu was generally in a defensive posture and no longer posed a threat to Wei. According to histories of the Wu court, Shu's defensive posture was interpreted by many Wu officials as a sign that Shu was abandoning the alliance and had entered into a treaty with Wei; but Wu's emperor Sun Quan correctly identified it as merely a sign of weakness, not an abandonment of the alliance.

In 237, Empress Zhang died. That year, Liu Shan took her younger sister as a consort, and in 238 created her empress. Her title remained the same as her sister, Empress Zhang.

In 243, Jiang Wan grew ill and transferred most of his authority to Fei Yi and Fei's assistant Dong Yun. In 244, when Wei's regent Cao Shuang attacked Hanzhong, it was Fei Yi who led the troops against Cao Shuang and dealt Wei a major defeat in the Battle of Xingshi. Jiang Wan, however, remained influential until his death in 245. Soon after Jiang Wan's death, Dong Yun also died — allowing the eunuch Huang Hao, a favourite of Liu Shan's, whose power Dong Yun had curbed, to start aggrandising his power. Huang Hao was viewed as corrupt and highly manipulative in domestic matters, and the governmental efficiency that was achieved during Zhuge Liang's and Jiang Wan's regencies began to deteriorate.

=== Fei Yi's regency ===
After Jiang Wan and Dong Yun's deaths, Liu Shan named Jiang Wei as Fei Yi's assistant, but both were largely involved only in military matters, as Liu Shan gradually became more self-assertive in non-military matters. It was also around this time that he became more interested in touring the countryside and increasing the use of luxury items, both of which added stress on the treasury, albeit not cripplingly so. Jiang Wei was interested in resuming Zhuge Liang's policies of attacking Wei aggressively, a strategy that Fei Yi partially agreed with — as he allowed Jiang Wei to make raids on Wei's borders, but never gave him a large number of troops, reasoning that Shu was in no position for a major military confrontation with Wei.

In 253, Fei Yi was assassinated by the general Guo Xun (郭循), a former Wei general who had been forced to surrender but who secretly maintained his loyalty to Wei. Fei Yi's death left Jiang Wei as the de facto regent, but with a power vacuum in domestic affairs, as Jiang Wei continued to be on the borders, conducting campaigns against Wei. Huang Hao's influence increased greatly as a result.

=== Jiang Wei's semi-regency ===
After Fei Yi's death, Jiang Wei assumed command of Shu's troops and began a number of campaigns against Wei—but while they were troubling to the Wei regents Sima Shi and Sima Zhao, the attacks largely inflicted no real damage against Wei, as Jiang Wei's campaigns were plagued by one problem that had plagued Zhuge Liang's—the lack of adequate food supply—and largely had to be terminated after a short duration. These campaigns instead had a detrimental effect on Shu, whose government no longer had the efficiency that it had during Zhuge Liang's and Jiang Wan's regencies, and therefore was unable to cope with the drain of resources that Jiang Wei's campaigns were having.

In 253, Jiang Wei made a coordinated attack on Wei, along with Wu's regent Zhuge Ke, but was eventually forced to withdraw after his troops ran out of food supplies — allowing Sima Shi to concentrate against Zhuge Ke, dealing Wu forces a devastating defeat that eventually caused so much resentment that Zhuge Ke was assassinated. This was the last of the coordinated attacks by Shu and Wu on Wei in the duration of the Shu-Wu alliance.

In 255, on one of Jiang Wei's campaigns, he dealt Wei forces a major defeat in the Battle of Didao, nearly capturing the important Wei border city Didao, but in 256, as he tried to again confront the Wei forces, he was instead dealt a defeat by Deng Ai, and this was a fairly devastating loss that left Jiang Wei with a weakened standing with the people. Many officials now openly questioned Jiang Wei's strategy, but Liu Shan took no actions to stop Jiang. Further, in 259, under Jiang Wei's suggestion, Liu Shan approved a plan where the main troops were withdrawn from major border cities to try to induce a Wei attack, with troops positioned in such a way as to trap the Wei troops should they do so — a strategy that would be used several years later, in 263, when Wei did attack, but which would prove to be a failure.

By 261, Huang Hao's power appeared paramount. Among the key domestic officials, only Dong Jue and Zhuge Liang's son Zhuge Zhan were able to maintain their posts without flattering Huang Hao. In 262, Huang Hao would in fact try to remove Jiang Wei and replace him with his friend Yan Yu (閻宇). Upon hearing this, Jiang Wei advised Liu Shan to execute Huang Hao, but the emperor denied the request, saying that the eunuch was but a servant who ran errands. Fearing retaliation, Jiang Wei left Chengdu to garrison troops at Tazhong (沓中; northwest of present-day Zhugqu County, Gansu).

According to the Wu ambassador Xue Xu, who visited Shu in 261 on the order of the Wu emperor Sun Xiu, the status that Shu was in at this point was:

The ruler is incompetent and does not know his errors; his subordinates do the bare minimum to avoid punishment. When I entered their court, I heard no proper speech; when I toured their countryside, the people looked sallow from hunger. Your servant has heard that swallows and sparrows may nests atop a great hall, mother and child both content, believing themselves safe. Yet should the rafters suddenly ignite, the birds remain happy, unaware of the disaster about to befall them. The situation is analogous.

=== Fall of Shu ===
In 262, aggravated by Jiang Wei's constant attacks, Wei's regent Sima Zhao planned to carry out a major campaign to terminate the Shu threat once and for all. Upon hearing rumours of this plan, Jiang Wei submitted a request to Liu Shan, warning him about the mustering of Wei troops under the generals Deng Ai, Zhuge Xu, and Zhong Hui near the border. However, Huang Hao persuaded Liu Shan with fortunetelling to take no action on Jiang Wei's requests for war preparations.

In 263, Sima Zhao launched his attacks, led by Deng Ai, Zhuge Xu, and Zhong Hui. Liu Shan followed Jiang Wei's previous plans and ordered the border troops to withdraw and prepare to trap Wei forces, rather than to confront them directly. The plan, however, had a fatal flaw — it assumed that Wei forces would siege the border cities, which, instead, Deng Ai and Zhong Hui ignored, and they advanced instead on Yang'an Pass (陽安關; in present-day Hanzhong, Shaanxi), capturing it. Jiang Wei was able to meet their troops and initially repel them, but Deng Ai led his army through a treacherous mountain pass and deep into Shu territory. There he launched a surprise attack on Jiangyou (江油; in present-day Mianyang, Sichuan). After defeating Zhuge Zhan there, Deng Ai had virtually no Shu troops left between his army and the Shu capital Chengdu. Faced with the prospect of defending Chengdu against Deng Ai's troops with no defences, Liu Shan took the advice of Secretary Qiao Zhou and promptly surrendered. This surrender was criticised by many: Chen Shou alone had sympathetic words, in a laconic coda to the biography of Qiao Zhou, his own former mentor. It would be until the Qing dynasty that other nuanced or positive assessments were made.

In March 264, Zhong Hui would carry out an attempt to seize power — which Jiang Wei, who had surrendered to Zhong Hui, tried to take advantage of to revive Shu. He advised Zhong Hui to falsely accuse Deng Ai of treason and arrest him, and, with their combined troops, rebel against Sima Zhao. Zhong Hui did so, and Jiang Wei planned to next kill Zhong Hui and his followers, and then redeclare Shu's independence under emperor Liu Shan, and had in fact written to Liu Shan to inform him of those plans. However, Zhong Hui's troops rebelled against him, and both Jiang Wei and Zhong Hui were killed in battle. Liu Shan himself was not harmed in the disturbance, although his crown prince Liu Xuan was killed in the confusion.

== Life after the fall of Shu ==
In early 264, Liu Shan with Empress Zhang and his entire family was relocated to the Wei capital Luoyang. On 11 April 264, (Note: Cao Huan's biography in the Sanguozhi recorded that Liu Shan was made the Duke of Anle on the dinghai day of the 3rd month of the 1st year of the Xianxi era of Cao Huan's reign. This date corresponds to 11 April 264 in the Julian calendar.) he was enfeoffed as Duke of Anle (安樂公) while his sons and grandsons became marquises. This practice was referred to as èrwáng-sānkè (二王三恪).

The Chronicle of Han and Jin by Xi Zuochi records an incident which has become the most famous tale to be associated with Liu Shan: One day, the Wei regent Sima Zhao invited Liu Shan and his followers to a feast, during which Sima Zhao arranged to have entertainers perform traditional Shu music and dance. The former Shu officials present were all saddened, but Liu Shan was visibly unmoved. When asked by Sima Zhao if he missed his former state, Liu Shan replied:

I am too happy here to think about Shu.
(此間樂不思蜀)

This phrase has become a Chinese idiom— lèbùsīshǔ (樂不思蜀), figuratively meaning "joyful and does not think of home / the past". The phrase has a negative connotation with regards to the person's character.

Former Shu official Xi Zheng then advised Liu Shan that the appropriate response was to lament how far he had been removed from his family tombs. Liu Shan followed the advice when he was asked the same question later, however Sima Zhao quickly guessed that he had been coached in his answer, and Liu Shan admitted as much. This was noted by Sima Zhao as a sign that Liu Shan was an incompetent fool; some later historians believed that it showed Liu Shan's wisdom in intentionally displaying a lack of ambition so that Sima Zhao would not view him as a threat. Liu Shan outlived Sima Zhao, and saw Sima Yan's (Zhao's son) forcing Cao Huan, the last emperor of Cao Wei, to yield the throne to him; Yan then established the Jin dynasty in February 266.

Liu Shan died in 271, during Sima Yan's reign, in Luoyang, and was given the posthumous name "Duke Si of Anle" (安樂思公; (Note: This posthumous name is per Wang Yin's Shu Ji. In Zizhi Tongjian Kaoyi, Sima Guang cited Sun Sheng's Jin Chunqiu, which recorded that Liu Shan's posthumous name was "Duke Hui" (惠公); Tongjian itself adopted the account found in Shu Ji when recording Liu's posthumous name.) "the deep-thinking duke of peace and happiness"). This landless sinecure lasted a few generations during the Jin dynasty, before being extinguished in the Disaster of Yongjia. (Note: Liu Bei's line did not completely die out. In his Shu Shi Pu, Sun Sheng indicated that he once met Liu Shan's younger half-brother Liu Yong's grandson Liu Xuan (劉玄) in Chengdu during Huan Wen's expedition against Li Shi, the last ruler of the Cheng-Han regime, in 347 (3rd year of the Yonghe era). Sun claimed that Li Xiong, founder of the Cheng Han regime, created Liu Xuan as his Duke of Anle, after Liu fled to Shu during the chaos of the Yongjia era.) Liu Yuan, the founder of Han-Zhao, one of the states in the Sixteen Kingdoms, claimed to be a legitimate successor of the Han dynasty. In that capacity, he bestowed Liu Shan the posthumous name "Emperor Xiaohuai" (孝懷皇帝; "the filial and kind emperor").

== Assessment ==
=== Contemporary ===
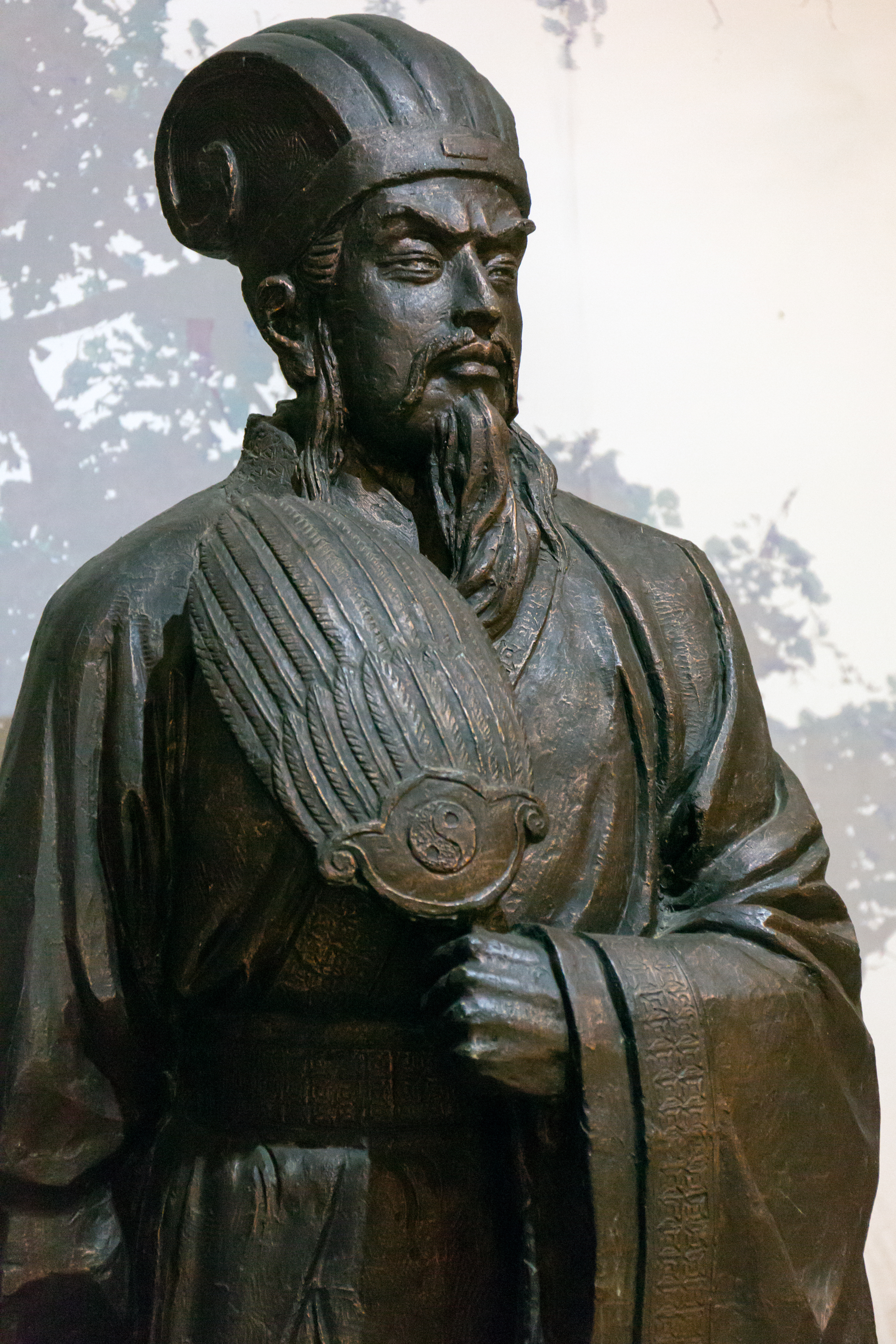
Statue of Zhuge Liang, whose employment is responsible for most of the contemporary praises toward Liu Shan.

Liu Shan had a very negative reputation among his contemporaries. He was seen as an incompetent ruler, more interested in satisfying his desires than looking after his country and was held responsible for appointing corrupt officials to position of power.

Both Xue Xu and Lu Kai, officials from the allied State of Eastern Wu described him as a mediocre ruler with Xue Xu further remarking that when he travelled to Shu for his mission as emissary in 261, he saw corruption among the officials and hunger among the people. Lu Kai noted that the natural defences of Sichuan along with a strong army were enough to protect his state, yet Liu Shan allowed disorder and corruption in his court, failed to recognize honest officials from dishonest, and was more interested in luxury.

This statement about the impressive natural defenses of the region is repeated by Li Te, when he led his clan back to Yi Province. While passing through Jian'ge Pass (劍閣關, in modern Guangyuan, Sichuan), he exclaimed that with such an impressive barrier, only a lesser man like Liu Shan could have been submitted by someone else.

As previously stated, Sima Zhao thought of Liu Shan's attitude as pleasure seeker, saying that even someone as talented as Zhuge Liang couldn't assist and safeguard him forever so even less Jiang Wei. Jia Chong answered to Sima Zhao that this was the same behaviour that allowed them to conquer Shu Han. A resounding anecdote when comparing with the events preceding the Wei invasion. When he was Emperor, Liu Shan repeatedly wanted to expand his harem however Dong Yun prevented him from doing so. Liu Shan was too afraid to act against him and for this disliked him. After Dong Yun's death, with the flattery of Chen Zhi and influence of Huang Hao, Liu Shan's hatred for Dong Yun grew each day. After Chen Zhi's death in 258, Huang Hao was controlling the politics of the State and none among the people of Shu did not miss Dong Yun.

Li Mi, a former official of Shu gave a mixed appraisal praising him for the employment of Zhuge Liang which allowed him to stabilize his power but also criticizing him for the employment of Huang Hao which allowed the later corruption of his court. Sun Sheng evaluated Liu Shan as a mediocre and ignorant ruler and denounced him for surrendering so quickly during the Conquest of Shu by Wei in 263 rather than use the local rugged terrain along with other armies in his government to resist the invaders. Pei Songzhi qualified him (along with Fei Yi) as an average individual who had no weight on the existence of his State.

Chang Qu, who wrote extensively about the history of the Sichuan region in the Chronicles of Huayang (Huayang Guo Zhi), greatly praised Zhuge Liang but lamented that his lord, Liu Shan wasn't the kind of man that could unite a country. In the volume 7 of the Huayang Guo Zhi, he ends Liu Shan's biography with Wang Chong's eulogy toward his former State of Shu Han where Wang Chong comments that Liu Shan was a mediocre ruler without ambition toward the world and was in part responsible for the decline of his State.

Chen Shou, who wrote Liu Shan's biography in the Records of the Three Kingdoms (Sanguozhi), in his appraisal commends Liu Shan when he appointed Zhuge Liang for following reason but condemns him for the employment of Huang Hao as being ignorant. He noted that when something is without substance, it reflects what's around. And this expression fits Liu Shan perfectly.

=== Modern ===
However, modern historians have taken a revisionist view, challenging the common portrayal of Liu Shan seeing him in a far more positive light.

Among them, Yi Zhongtian argued that even competent emperors like Emperor Wu of Han had evil courtiers beside him; Liu Shan is not the only case. Moreover, surrounding Liu Shan were not only evil courtiers, but also many competent and talented officers like Jiang Wan, Fei Yi and Dong Yun. Secondly, Liu Shan surrendering without much fighting is blameworthy, but the fall of Shu Han was actually due to many reasons. Thirdly, for the case of Zhao Yun, Zhao's official position during his life was actually lower than Guan Yu, Zhang Fei, Ma Chao and Huang Zhong. Hence, Liu Shan's awarding of posthumous Marquis titles to the latter four but not timely to Zhao Yun was understandable. Finally, Liu Shan's behavior in front of Sima Zhao was purposeful: he pretended to be stupid and despicable so that Sima Zhao would ignore him and spare his family, and Liu Shan was successful. Being able to fool the distrustful Sima Zhao meant Liu Shan was actually not a fool.

Moreover, there were notable signs of Liu Shan's competence during his reign. He cleverly retook direct control of state affairs after the death of Zhuge Liang and appointed Jiang Wan and Fei Yi so that the two could keep each other in check. In 238, Cao Wei made war with Gongsun Yuan and many people in Shu Han believed it was a good chance for northern expansion. However, Liu Shan carefully instructed Fei Yi to attack only in combination with Eastern Wu, and only when Cao Wei was unprepared. Several historical commentators thus compare Liu Shan's caution favorably with that of Liu Bei and Zhuge Liang's costly and ineffective campaigns. Finally, Liu Shan's surrender in 262-263 has been viewed with sympathy as an inevitable choice by commentators in both historical records and contemporary times, due to the vast difference in population and military capability between the two states, as well as the tendency of victors to massacre the citizens of enemy states that had refused to surrender. In particular, Liu Shan's surrender is often compared favorably with that of Gongsun Yuan, a regional warlord who attempted to retake power by allying with Eastern Wu, which eventually resulted in the extermination of his clan, and a bloody massacre of his population base at Liaodong. In contrast, Liu Shan's surrender led to a peaceful transfer of power to the Wei kingdom, with most of the population unharmed, except during the week of unrest caused by Jiang Wei's plotting.

== Family ==
- Empress Jing'ai, of the Zhang clan (敬哀皇后 張氏; d. 237)
- Empress Zhang, of the Zhang clan (張皇后 張氏; fl. 237–264)
- Noble Lady Wang, of the Wang clan (王貴人 王氏)
  - Liu Xuan, Crown Prince (皇太子 劉璿; 224–March 264), first son
- Li Zhaoyi, of the Li clan (李昭儀 李氏)
- Unknown:
  - Liu Yao, Prince of Anding (安定王劉瑤), second son
  - Liu Cong, Prince of Xihe (西河王劉琮; d. 262), third son
  - Liu Zan (劉瓚), fourth son
  - Liu Chen, Prince of Beidi (北地王劉諶; d. 263), fifth son
  - Liu Xun, Prince of Xinxing (新興王劉恂; fl.271), sixth son; later succeeded the peerage of Duke of Anle
  - Liu Qian (劉虔), seventh son

== In popular culture ==
=== Romance of the Three Kingdoms ===
Liu Shan appears as a character in the historical novel Romance of the Three Kingdoms by Luo Guanzhong, which romanticises the historical events before and during the Three Kingdoms period. In the novel, Liu Shan is generally portrayed as an incapable ruler who was easily swayed by words, especially those from the eunuch Huang Hao, whom he favoured.

=== In modern works ===
Liu Shan is a playable character in Koei's Dynasty Warriors video game series, first available in the seventh instalment, as well as in Warriors Orochi 3, also by Koei.

== See also ==
- List of Chinese monarchs
- Lists of people of the Three Kingdoms

Emperor Xiaohuai of Shu Han House of Liu Born: 207 Died: 271
Regnal titles
Preceded by Liu Bei	Emperor of Shu Han; 223–263 with Zhuge Liang (223–234); Jiang Wan (234–245); Dong Yun (245–246); Fei Yi (245–253); Jiang Wei (253–263)	Abolished
Royal titles
New creation	Duke of Anle; 264–271	Unknown
Titles in pretence
Preceded by Liu Bei	— TITULAR — Emperor of China; Royal descent claimant 223–263; Reason for succession failure: Conquest of Shu by Wei	Succeeded by Cao Huan
