= List of people of the Three Kingdoms (X) =

The following is a partial list of people significant to the Three Kingdoms period (220–280) of Chinese history. Their romanised names start with the letter X.

== X ==
| Name | Courtesy name | Birth year | Death year | Ancestral home (present-day location) | Role | Allegiance | Previous allegiance(s) | Notes |
|---|---|---|---|---|---|---|---|---|
| Lady Xi 習氏 | | | | Xiangyang (Xiangyang, Hubei) | Pang Lin's wife | Cao Wei | Shu Han | |
| Xi Jia 郤嘉 | | | | | Politician | Cao Wei | | |
| Xi Jian 郤儉 | | | 188 | Yangcheng (Dengfeng, Henan) | Politician | Han dynasty | | |
| Xi Jian 郤儉 | | | | Yingchuan (Xuchang, Henan) | Fangshi | Cao Wei | | |
| Xi Long 習隆 | | | | Xiangyang (Xiangyang, Hubei) | General | Shu Han | | |
| Xi Shou 習授 | | | | Nan County (Jingzhou, Hubei) | | Cao Wei | | |
| Xi Su 襲肅 | | | | | General | Eastern Wu | Han dynasty | |
| Xi Wen 習溫 | | | | Xiangyang (Xiangyang, Hubei) | Politician | Eastern Wu | | |
| Xi Xi 奚熙 | | | | | General | Eastern Wu | | |
| Xi Yi 郤揖 | | | | Yanshi, Henan (Yanshi, Henan) | General | Cao Wei | Shu Han | |
| Xi Yingxi 習英習 | | | | Xiangyang (Xiangyang, Hubei) | Li Heng’s wife | Eastern Wu | | |
| Xi Zhen 習禎 | Wenxiang 文祥 | | | Xiangyang (Xiangyang, Hubei) | Politician | Shu Han | | |
| Xi Zhen 習珍 | | | 220 | Xiangyang (Xiangyang, Hubei) | General | Liu Bei | | |
| Xi Zheng 郤正 | Lingxian 令先 | | 278 | Yanshi, Henan (Yanshi, Henan) | Politician | Jin dynasty | Shu Han | Sanguozhi vol. 42. |
| Xi Zhicai 戲志才 | | | | Yingchuan (Yuzhou City, Henan) | Advisor, politician | Cao Cao | | |
| Xi Zhong 習忠 | | | | Xiangyang (Xiangyang, Hubei) | Politician | Shu Han | | |
| Lady Xia 夏氏 | | | | | Mother of Empress Mao | Cao Wei | | |
| Xia Mou 夏牟 | | | | | General | Han dynasty | | |
| Xia She 夏舍 | | | 228 | | General | Cao Wei | | |
| Xia Yi 夏逸 | | | | | Politician | Cao Wei | | |
| Xia Yu 夏育 | | | | | General | Han dynasty | | |
| Xia Yun 夏惲 | | | 189 | | Eunuch | Han dynasty | | |
| Xia Rong 夏榮 | | | | | Fangshi | | | |
| Xia Zhao 夏昭 | | | | | General | Yuan Shao | | |
| Lady Xiahou 夏侯氏 | | | | Qiao County, Pei (Bozhou, Anhui) | Zhang Fei's wife | Shu Han | Cao Cao | |
| Xiahou Ba 夏侯霸 | Zhongquan 仲權 | | 259 | Qiao County, Pei (Bozhou, Anhui) | General | Shu Han | Cao Wei | |
| Xiahou Bao 夏侯褒 | | | | Qiao County, Pei (Bozhou, Anhui) | Politician | Jin dynasty | | |
| Xiahou Ben 夏侯本 | | | | | Politician | Cao Wei | | |
| Xiahou Bo 夏侯博 | | | | | General | Liu Bei | | |
| Xiahou Cheng 夏侯稱 | Shuquan 叔權 | | | Qiao County, Pei (Bozhou, Anhui) | | Cao Wei | | |
| Xiahou Cheng 夏侯承 | | | | | Politician | Eastern Wu | | |
| Xiahou Chong 夏侯充 | | | | Qiao County, Pei (Bozhou, Anhui) | Politician | Cao Wei | | |
| Xiahou Dun 夏侯惇 | Yuanrang 元讓 | | 220 | Qiao County, Pei (Bozhou, Anhui) | General | Cao Wei | | Sanguozhi vol. 9. |
| Xiahou Feng 夏侯奉 | | | | Qiao County, Pei (Bozhou, Anhui) | Politician | Cao Wei | | |
| Xiahou He 夏侯和 | Yiquan 義權 | | | Qiao County, Pei (Bozhou, Anhui) | General, politician | Jin dynasty | Cao Wei | |
| Xiahou Heng 夏侯衡 | Boquan 伯權 | | | Qiao County, Pei (Bozhou, Anhui) | Politician | Cao Wei | | |
| Xiahou Hui 夏侯惠 | Zhiquan 稚權 | | | Qiao County, Pei (Bozhou, Anhui) | General, politician | Cao Wei | | |
| Xiahou Hui 夏侯徽 | Yuanrong 媛容 | 211 | 234 | Qiao County, Pei (Bozhou, Anhui) | Sima Shi's wife | Cao Wei | | |
| Xiahou Ji 夏侯績 | | | | Qiao County, Pei (Bozhou, Anhui) | General | Cao Wei | | |
| Xiahou Jun 夏侯駿 | | | | Qiao County, Pei (Bozhou, Anhui) | General | Jin dynasty | Cao Wei | |
| Xiahou Lan 夏侯蘭 | | | | Zhending, Changshan (South of Zhengding, Hebei) | General | Liu Bei | Cao Cao | |
| Xiahou Lian 夏侯廉 | | | | Qiao County, Pei (Bozhou, Anhui) | Politician | Cao Wei | | |
| Xiahou Lingnü 夏侯令女 | | | | Qiao County, Pei (Bozhou, Anhui) | | Cao Wei | | |
| Xiahou Mao 夏侯楙 | Zilin 子林 | | | Qiao County, Pei (Bozhou, Anhui) | General | Cao Wei | | |
| Xiahou Rong 夏侯榮 | Youquan 幼權 | | 219 | Qiao County, Pei (Bozhou, Anhui) | | Cao Cao | | |
| Xiahou Ru 夏侯儒 | Junlin 俊林 | | | Qiao County, Pei (Bozhou, Anhui) | General | Cao Wei | | |
| Xiahou Shang 夏侯尚 | Boren 伯仁 | | 225 | Qiao County, Pei (Bozhou, Anhui) | General | Cao Wei | | Sanguozhi vol. 9. |
| Xiahou Wei 夏侯威 | Jiquan 季權 | | | Qiao County, Pei (Bozhou, Anhui) | General, politician | Cao Wei | | |
| Xiahou Wenning 夏侯文寧 | | | | Qiao County, Pei (Bozhou, Anhui) | Politician | Cao Wei | | |
| Xiahou Xian 夏侯咸 | | | | | General | Cao Wei | | |
| Xiahou Xian 夏侯獻 | | | | Qiao County, Pei (Bozhou, Anhui) | General | Cao Wei | | |
| Xiahou Xuan 夏侯玄 | Taichu 太初 | 209 | 254 | Qiao County, Pei (Bozhou, Anhui) | Politician, scholar | Cao Wei | | Sanguozhi vol. 9. |
| Xiahou Yi 夏侯廙 | | | | Qiao County, Pei (Bozhou, Anhui) | Politician | Jin dynasty | Cao Wei | |
| Xiahou Yuan 夏侯淵 | Miaocai 妙才 | | 219 | Qiao County, Pei (Bozhou, Anhui) | General | Cao Cao | | Sanguozhi vol. 9. |
| Xiahou Zhan 夏侯湛 | Xiaoruo 孝若 | | | Qiao County, Pei (Bozhou, Anhui) | General | Jin dynasty | | Jin Shu vol. 55. |
| Xiahou Zhuang 夏侯莊 | Zhongrong 仲容 | | | Qiao County, Pei (Bozhou, Anhui) | Politician | Jin dynasty | | |
| Xiahou Zijiang 夏侯子江 | | | | Qiao County, Pei (Bozhou, Anhui) | Politician | Cao Wei | | |
| Xiahou Zizang 夏侯子臧 | | | | Qiao County, Pei (Bozhou, Anhui) | Politician | Cao Wei | | |
| Xiahou Zuan 夏侯纂 | | | | | Politician | Shu Han | | |
| Xiahou Zuo 夏侯佐 | | | 266 | Qiao County, Pei (Bozhou, Anhui) | Politician | Jin dynasty | | |
| Xiang Chong 向寵 | | | 240 | Yicheng, Xiangyang (Yicheng, Hubei) | General, politician | Shu Han | | Sanguozhi vol. 41. |
| Xiang Chong 向充 | | | | Yicheng, Xiangyang (Yicheng, Hubei) | Politician | Cao Wei | Shu Han | |
| Xiang Cun 向存 | | | 214 | | General | Liu Zhang | | |
| Xiang Ju 向舉 | | | | | Advisor | Shu Han | Liu Zhang | |
| Xiang Jun 項峻 | | | | | Politician, writer | Eastern Wu | | |
| Xiang Kai 襄楷 | Gongju 公矩 | | | Pingyuan (Pingyuan County, Shandong) | Fangshi | Han dynasty | | Houhanshu vol. 30. (Part.2) |
| Xiang Lang 向朗 | Juda 巨達 | | 247 | Yicheng, Xiangyang (Yicheng, Hubei) | Advisor, politician | Shu Han | Liu Biao | Sanguozhi vol. 41. |
| Xiang Tiao 向條 | Wenbao 文豹 | | | Yicheng, Xiangyang (Yicheng, Hubei) | General, politician | Jin dynasty | Shu Han | Sanguozhi vol. 41. |
| Xiang Xiong 向雄 | Maobo 茂伯 | | | Shanyang County (Jinxiang County, Shandong) | Politician | Jin dynasty | Cao Wei | Jin Shu vol. 48. |
| Xiang Xiu 向秀 | Ziqi 子期 | 227 | 272 | Henei (Southwest of Wuzhi County, Henan) | Politician, scholar | Jin dynasty | Cao Wei | Jin Shu vol. 49. |
| Xiang Xu 向栩 | Fuxing 甫興 | | 184 | Henei County (Jiaozuo, Wuzhi County, Henan) | Politician | Han dynasty | | Houhanshu vol. 81. |
| Xianyu Dan 鮮于丹 | | | | | General | Eastern Wu | | |
| Xianyu Fu 鮮于輔 | | | | Yuyang (Miyun County, Beijing) | General | Cao Wei | Liu Yu | |
| Xianyu Si 鮮于嗣 | | | | | General | Cao Wei | | |
| Xianyu Yin 鮮于銀 | | | | | General | Liu Yu | | |
| Xiao Jian 蕭建 | | | | Donghai (Tancheng County, Shandong) | Politician | Han dynasty | | |
| Lady Xie 謝氏 | | | | Shanyin, Kuaiji (Southeast of Shaoxing, Zhejiang) | Noble lady | Eastern Wu | | Sanguozhi vol. 50. |
| Xie Biao 解𢢼 | | | | | General | Cao Wei | | |
| Xie Cheng 謝承 | Weiping 偉平 | | | Shanyin, Kuaiji (Southeast of Shaoxing, Zhejiang) | Politician, writer | Eastern Wu | | |
| Xie Chong 謝崇 | | | | Shanyin, Kuaiji (Shaoxing, Zhejiang) | General | Eastern Wu | | |
| Xie Ci 謝慈 | Xiaozong 孝宗 | | | Pengcheng (Xuzhou, Jiangsu) | Advisor | Eastern Wu | | |
| Xie Fei 謝斐 | | | | Kuaiji County, Shanyin (Shaoxing, Yuecheng District, Zhejiang) | Politician | Eastern Wu | | |
| Xie Gai 謝該 | Wenyi 文儀 | | | Nanyang County, Zhangling (Zaoyang, Hubei) | Politician, scholar | Han dynasty | | Houhanshu vol. 79. (part.2) |
| Xie Gong 謝厷 | | | | | Advisor, politician | Eastern Wu | | |
| Xie Hong 解弘 | | | | | General | Cao Wei | | |
| Xie Hong 謝宏 | | | | | General | Eastern Wu | | |
| Xie Huan 謝奐 | | | | | Politician | Cao Cao | Han dynasty | |
| Xie Ji 謝姬 | | | | | Noble lady | Eastern Wu | | |
| Xie Jing 謝旌 | | | | | General | Eastern Wu | | |
| Xie Jing 謝景 | Shufa 叔發 | | | Nanyang County (Nanyang, Henan) | Politician | Eastern Wu | | |
| Xie Jiong 謝煚 | | | | Shanyin, Kuaiji (Southeast of Shaoxing, Zhejiang) | Politician | Han dynasty | | |
| Xie Jun 解儁 | | | | | Politician | Cao Wei | | |
| Xie Qi 謝奇 | | | | Lujiang County (Lujiang County, Anhui) | General | Cao Wei | | |
| Xie Shun 謝順 | | | | | General | Cao Wei | | |
| Xie Tan 謝譚 | | | | | | | | |
| Xie Xu 謝勖 | | | | Shanyin, Kuaiji (Shaoxing, Zhejiang) | Politician | Eastern Wu | | |
| Xie Yuan 謝淵 | Xiude 休德 | | | Kuaiji (Shaoxing, Zhejiang) | General | Eastern Wu | | |
| Xie Zan 謝贊 | | | | Shanyin, Kuaiji (Southeast of Shaoxing, Zhejiang) | Politician | Eastern Wu | | |
| Xie Zhen 謝貞 | | | | Shanyin, Kuaiji (Southeast of Shaoxing, Zhejiang) | Politician | Han dynasty | | |
| Xie Ziwei 謝子微 | | | | Runan County, Zhaoling (Luohe, Henan) | | Han dynasty | | |
| Xieguini 泄歸泥 | | | | | Tribal leader | Xianbei | | |
| Xin Chang 辛敞 | Taiyong 泰雍 | | | Yangzhai, Yingchuan (Yuzhou City, Henan) | General | Jin dynasty | Cao Wei | |
| Xin Cheng 鐔承 | Gongwen 公文 | | | Guanghan (Shehong County, Sichuan) | Politician | Shu Han | | |
| Xin Ji 辛機 | | | | | Politician | Cao Wei | | |
| Xin Pi 辛毗 | Zuozhi 佐治 | | | Yangzhai, Yingchuan (Yuzhou City, Henan) | Politician | Cao Wei | Yuan Shao | Sanguozhi vol. 25. |
| Xin Ping 辛評 | Zhongzhi 仲治 | | 204 | Yangzhai, Yingchuan (Yuzhou City, Henan) | Advisor | Yuan Tan | Yuan Shao | |
| Xin Xianying 辛憲英 | | 191 | 269 | Yangzhai, Yingchuan (Yuzhou City, Henan) | | | | |
| Xing Ju 邢舉 | | | | | General | Han dynasty | | |
| Xing Yong 邢顒 | Zi'ang 子昂 | | 223 | Mo County, Hejian (North of Renqiu, Hebei) | Politician | Cao Wei | | Sanguozhi vol. 12. |
| Xing You 邢友 | | | | Mo County, Hejian (North of Renqiu, Hebei) | Politician | Cao Wei | | |
| Xing Zhen 邢貞 | | | | | Politician | Cao Wei | | |
| Xiong Mu 熊睦 | | | | | Advisor | Eastern Wu | | |
| Xiu Yun 修允/脩允 | | | | Linchuan, Yangzhou (Nancheng County, Jiangxi) | General | Eastern Wu | | |
| Xiu Ze 修則/脩則 | | | 268 | Linchuan, Yangzhou (Nancheng County, Jiangxi) | General | Eastern Wu | | |
| Xiuwulu 修武盧 | | | | | Tribal leader | Wuhuan | | |
| Lady Xu 徐氏 | | | | Fuchun, Wu (Fuyang, Zhejiang) | Noble lady | Eastern Wu | | Sanguozhi vol. 50. |
| Lady Xu 徐氏 | | | | | Noble lady | Eastern Wu | | |
| Xu Ba 徐霸 | | | | Yang County, Hedong (Southeast of Hongdong County, Shanxi) | | Cao Wei | | |
| Xu Biao 徐彪 | Zhongyu 仲虞 | | | Guangling (Yangzhou, Jiangsu) | General | Eastern Wu | | |
| Xu Can 徐粲 | | | | | Politician | Eastern Wu | | |
| Xu Chang 許昌 | | | | Kuaiji County (Shaoxing, Zhejiang) | Rebel leader | | | |
| Xu Chu 許褚 | Zhongkang 仲康 | | | Qiao County, Pei (Bozhou, Anhui) | General | Cao Wei | | Xu Zhu in RTK games. |
| Xu Ci 許慈 | Rendu 仁篤 | | | Nanyang (Nanyang, Henan) | Scholar, politician | Shu Han | | Sanguozhi vol. 42. |
| Xu Cun 徐存 | | | | | General | Eastern Wu | | |
| Xu Dan 許耽 | | | | Danyang (Xuancheng, Anhui) | General | Liu Bei | | |
| Xu Deng 徐登 | | | | Minzhong (Quanzhou, Fujian) | Fangshi | | | |
| Xu Ding 許定 | | | | Qiao County, Pei (Bozhou, Anhui) | General | Cao Wei | | |
| Xu Feng 徐奉 | | | 184 | | Eunuch | Han dynasty | | |
| Xu Gai 徐蓋 | | | | Yang County, Hedong (Southeast of Hongdong County, Shanxi) | Politician | Cao Wei | | |
| Xu Gan 徐幹 | Weichang 偉長 | 170 | 217 | Beihai (West of Changle County, Shandong) | Scholar | | | |
| Xu Gong 許貢 | | | | | Politician | Han dynasty | | |
| Xu Gu 徐顧 | | | | | General | Sun Quan | | |
| Xu Guo 許國 | | | | Nanyang County (Nanyang, Henan) | | Jin dynasty | Shu Han | |
| Xu He 徐和 | | | | Jinanguo (Zhangqiu, Shandong) | Rebel leader | Yellow Turban rebels | | |
| Xu Huang 徐晃 | Gongming 公明 | | 227 | Yang County, Hedong (Southeast of Hongdong County, Shanxi) | General | Cao Wei | | Sanguozhi vol. 17. |
| Xu Hun 許混 | | | | Runan County, Pingyu (Pingyu County, Henan) | Politician | Cao Wei | | |
| Xu Ji 徐箕 | | | | | | Cao Wei | | |
| Xu Jiao 徐矯 | | | | Fuchun, Wu (Fuyang, Zhejiang) | General | Eastern Wu | | |
| Xu Jilong 徐季龍 | Kaiming 開明 | | | | Politician | Cao Wei | | |
| Xu Jing 許靖 | Wenxiu 文休 | | 222 | Pingyu, Runan (Pingyu County, Henan) | Advisor, politician | Shu Han | Kong Zhou, Xu Gong, Wang Lang, Liu Zhang | Sanguozhi vol. 38. |
| Xu Ju 許據 | | | | Gaoyang (Gaoyang County, Hebei) | General, politician | Cao Wei | | |
| Xu Kai 徐楷 | | | | Ju County, Langya (Ju County, Shandong) | General | Eastern Wu | | |
| Xu Kun 徐琨 | | | | Fuchun, Wu (Fuyang, Zhejiang) | General | Sun Quan | | |
| Xu Ling 徐陵 | Yuanda 元大 | | | Taimo, Kuaiji (Quzhou, Zhejiang) | General, politician | Eastern Wu | | |
| Xu Miao 徐邈 | Jingshan 景山 | 171 | 249 | Guangyang (Daxing District, Beijing) | Politician | Cao Wei | | Sanguozhi vol. 27. |
| Xu Min 許旻 | | | 250 | | General | Eastern Wu | | |
| Xu Ping 徐平 | Boxian 伯先 | | | Taimo, Kuaiji (Quzhou, Zhejiang) | General, politician | Eastern Wu | | |
| Xu Qi 徐旗 | | | | | Politician | Eastern Wu | | |
| Xu Qian 許乾 | | | | | Warlord | | | |
| Xu Qin 許欽 | | | | Runan County, Pingyu (Pingyu County, Henan) | | Shu Han | | |
| Xu Qin 徐欽 | | | | Haixi County, Guangling (Guannan County, Jiangsu) | | Cao Wei | | |
| Xu Qiu 徐璆 | Mengyu 孟玉 | | | Guangling (Yangzhou, Jiangsu) | General | Cao Cao | Han dynasty | Houhanshu vol. 48. |
| Xu Rong 徐榮 | | | 192 | Xiangping / Xuantu, Liaodong | General | Dong Zhuo | | |
| Xu Shang 徐商 | | | | | General | Cao Wei | | |
| Xu Shao 許劭 | Zijiang 子將 | 150 | 195 | Pingyu, Runan (Pingyu County, Henan) | Commentator, philosopher, politician | Liu Yao | | Houhanshu vol. 68. |
| Xu Shao 許韶 | | | | Kuaiji County (Shaoxing, Zhejiang) | Rebel leader | | | |
| Xu Shao 徐紹 | | | | | General | Cao Wei | Eastern Wu | |
| Xu Sheng 徐盛 | Wenxiang 文響 | | | Ju County, Langya (Ju County, Shandong) | General | Eastern Wu | | Sanguozhi vol. 55. |
| Xu Shu 徐庶 | Yuanzhi 元直 | | | Yingchuan (Yuzhou City, Henan) | Advisor, politician | Cao Wei | Liu Bei | |
| Xu Shulong 許叔龍 | | | | Pingyu, Runan (Pingyu County, Henan) | Politician | Shu Han | | |
| Xu Si 許汜 | | | | | Advisor | Liu Biao | Zhang Miao, Cao Cao, Lu Bu | |
| Xu Ta 徐他 | | | 199 | | | Cao Cao | | |
| Xu Tong 徐統 | | | | Dongguan, Langya (Yishui County, Shandong) | Politician | Cao Wei | | |
| Xu Wu 徐武 | | | | Guangyang (Daxing District, Beijing) | Politician | Cao Wei | | |
| Xu Xi 徐翕 | | | | | | Cao Cao | Lü Bu | |
| Xu Xiang 徐詳 | Ziming 子明 | | | Wu County, Wucheng (Huzhou, Zhejiang) | General | Eastern Wu | | |
| Xu Xiang 許相 | | | 189 | | Politician | Han dynasty | | |
| Xu Xu 許栩 | | | | Pingyu, Runan (Pingyu County, Henan) | Politician | Han dynasty | | |
| Xu Xuan 徐宣 | Baojian 寶堅 | 167 | 236 | Haixi County, Guangling (Guannan County, Jiangsu) | Politician | Cao Wei | | Sanguozhi vol. 22. |
| Xu Xun 徐勳 | | | | | Politician | Yuan Shao | | |
| Xu Xun 許勛 | | | | Nanyang County (Nanyang, Henan) | Scholar | Shu Han | | |
| Xu Yan 許晏 | | | 233 | | General | Eastern Wu | | |
| Xu Yang 許瑒 | Weijun | | | Runan County, Pingyu (Pingyu County, Henan) | Politician | Han dynasty | | Houhanshu vol. 82. (Part.1) |
| Xu Yi 徐奕 | Jicai 季才 | | 219 | Dongguan (Yishui County, Shandong) | Politician | Cao Cao | | Sanguozhi vol. 12. |
| Xu Yi 許儀 | | | 263 | Qiao County, Pei (Bozhou, Anhui) | General | Cao Wei | | |
| Xu Yi 徐逸 | | | | | General | Sun Ce | | |
| Xu Yi 徐揖 | | | | | Politician | Han dynasty | | |
| Xu Yi 徐毅 | | | | | | Cao Cao | | |
| Xu Yin 徐胤 | | | | | General | Jin dynasty | | |
| Xu Ying 徐英 | Boji 伯濟 | | | Fengyi (Dali County, Shaanxi) | Politician | Cao Wei | | |
| Xu You 許攸 | Ziyuan 子遠 | | 204 | Nanyang (Nanyang, Henan) | Advisor | Cao Cao | Yuan Shao | |
| Xu You 許攸 | | | | | Politician | Cao Wei | Han dynasty | |
| Xu You 許游 | | | | Runan County, Pingyu (Pingyu County, Henan) | Politician | Shu Han | | |
| Xu Yuan 徐元 | | | | | General | Eastern Wu | | |
| Xu Yuan 徐原 | | | | Wu County (Suzhou, Jiangsu) | Advisor | Eastern Wu | | |
| Xu Yuanxian 徐元賢 | | | | | | | | |
| Xu Yun 許允 | | | | | Advisor | Shu Han | | |
| Xu Yun 許允 | Shizong 士宗 | | | Gaoyang (Gaoyang County, Hebei) | General | Cao Wei | | |
| Xu Zhang 許章 | | | | | | Han dynasty | | |
| Xu Zhao 許昭 | | | | | General | Han dynasty | | |
| Xu Zhen 徐真 | | | | Fuchun, Wu (Fuyang, Zhejiang) | Lady Xu's grandfather | | | |
| Xu Zheng 徐整 | | | | | Politician, writer | Eastern Wu | | |
| Xu Zhi 徐質 | | | 254 | | General | Cao Wei | | |
| Xu Zhi 徐質 | | | 225 | | General | Cao Wei | | |
| Xu Zhi 許芝 | | | | | Politician | Cao Wei | | |
| Xu Zhong 徐忠 | | | | | General | Sun Quan | | |
| Xu Zong 許綜 | | | | Qiao County, Pei (Bozhou, Anhui) | Politician | Jin dynasty | | |
| Xu Zong 徐宗 | | | | Yuzhang (Nanchang, Jiangxi) | General | Eastern Wu | | |
| Xu Zuo 徐祚 | | | | Fuchun, Wu (Fuyang, Zhejiang) | General | Eastern Wu | | |
| Xuan Fan 宣璠 | | | | | General | Dong Zhuo | | |
| Xuan Jing 宣靖 | | | | Shanyang County (Jining, Shandong) | | Han dynasty | | |
| Xuan Long 宣隆 | | | | | Politician | Cao Wei | | |
| Xue Fang 薛房 | | | | Dong County, Dong'a (Yanggu County, Shandong) | Politician | Han dynasty | | |
| Xue Hong 薛洪 | | | | | Politician | Cao Wei | Zhang Yang | |
| Xue Lan 薛蘭 | | | 195 | | General | Lü Bu | | |
| Xue Li 薛禮 | | | 195 | | Advisor | Liu Yao | | |
| Xue Lingyun 薛靈芸 | | | | Zhending, Changshan (South of Zhengding, Hebei) | Palace maid | Cao Wei | | |
| Xue Qi 薛齊 | Yifu 夷甫 | | | | General | Jin dynasty | Shu Han, Cao Wei | |
| Xue Qiao 薛喬 | | | | | General | Cao Wei | | |
| Xue Sheng 薛勝 | | | | | General | Jin dynasty | | |
| Xue Ti 薛悌 | Xiaowei 孝威 | 173 | 240 | Dong county, Yanzhou (Puyang, Henan) | General | Cao Wei | | |
| Xue Xia 薛夏 | Xuansheng 宣聲 | | | Hanyang (Tianshui, Gansu) | Scholar, politician | Cao Wei | | |
| Xue Xu 薛珝 | | 207 | 270 | Zhuyi, Pei (Suixi County, Anhui) | General, politician | Eastern Wu | | |
| Xue Ying 薛瑩 | Daoyan 道言 | | 282 | Zhuyi, Pei (Suixi County, Anhui) | Politician | Eastern Wu | | |
| Xue Yong 薛永 | Maochang 茂長 | | | | Politician | Shu Han | | |
| Xue Yu 薛郁 | | | | Shanyang County (Jining, Shandong) | | Han dynasty | | |
| Xue Zhou 薛州 | | | | | Rebel leader | | | |
| Xue Zong 薛綜 | Jingwen 敬文 | | 243 | Zhuyi, Pei (Suixi County, Anhui) | Advisor, politician, scholar | Eastern Wu | | Sanguozhi vol. 53. |
| Xun Biao 荀彪 | | | | Yingyin County, Yingchuan (Xuchang County, Henan) | Politician | Cao Wei | | |
| Xun Can 荀粲 | Fengqian 奉倩 | | | Yingyin County, Yingchuan (Xuchang County, Henan) | Astrologer | Cao Wei | | |
| Xun Chen 荀諶 | Youruo 友若 | | | Yingyin County, Yingchuan (Xuchang County, Henan) | Advisor | Yuan Shao | Han Fu | |
| Xun Dan 荀憺 | | | | Yingyin County, Yingchuan (Xuchang County, Henan) | Politician | Jin dynasty | | |
| Xun Fu 荀旉 | | | | Yingyin County, Yingchuan (Xuchang County, Henan) | | Han dynasty | | |
| Xun Gun 荀緄 | | | | Yingyin County, Yingchuan (Xuchang County, Henan) | Politician | Han dynasty | | |
| Xun Han 荀甝 | | | | Yingyin County, Yingchuan (Xuchang County, Henan) | Politician | Cao Wei | | |
| Xun Hong 荀閎 | Zhongmao 仲茂 | | | Yingyin County, Yingchuan (Xuchang County, Henan) | Politician | Cao Wei | | |
| Xun Hui 荀煇 | Jingwen 景文 | | | Yingyin County, Yingchuan (Xuchang County, Henan) | Politician | Jin dynasty | | |
| Xun Ji 荀緝 | | | | Yingyin County, Yingchuan (Xuchang County, Henan) | Advisor | Cao Cao | | |
| Xun Jian 荀儉 | | | | Yingyin County, Yingchuan (Xuchang County, Henan) | | Han dynasty | | |
| Xun Jing 荀靖 | Shuci 叔慈 | | | Yingyin County, Yingchuan (Xuchang County, Henan) | Hermit | | | |
| Xun Jun 荀頵 | Wenbo 溫伯 | | | Yingyin County, Yingchuan (Xuchang County, Henan) | Politician | Cao Wei | | |
| Xun Kai 荀愷 | | | | Yingyin County, Yingchuan (Xuchang County, Henan) | | Jin dynasty | Cao Wei | |
| Xun Kui 荀悝 | | | | Yingyin County, Yingchuan (Xuchang County, Henan) | General | Jin dynasty | | |
| Xun Qi 荀祈 | | | | Yingyin County, Yingchuan (Xuchang County, Henan) | Politician | Han dynasty | | |
| Xun Qu 荀衢 | | | | Yingyin County, Yingchuan (Xuchang County, Henan) | | Han dynasty | | |
| Xun Rong 荀融 | Boya 伯雅 | | | Yingyin County, Yingchuan (Xuchang County, Henan) | General | Cao Wei | | |
| Xun Shao 荀紹 | | | | Yingyin County, Yingchuan (Xuchang County, Henan) | Politician | Cao Wei | | |
| Xun Shen 荀詵 | Manqian 曼倩 | | | Yingyin County, Yingchuan (Xuchang County, Henan) | General | Cao Wei | | |
| Xun Shen 荀詵 | | | | Yingyin County, Yingchuan (Xuchang County, Henan) | | Han dynasty | | |
| Xun Shi 荀適 | | | | Yingyin County, Yingchuan (Xuchang County, Henan) | Politician | Cao Wei | | |
| Xun Shuang 荀爽 | Ciming 慈明 | 128 | 190 | Yingyin County, Yingchuan (Xuchang County, Henan) | Politician | Dong Zhuo | Han dynasty | Houhanshu vol. 62. |
| Xun Su 荀肅 | | | | Yingyin County, Yingchuan (Xuchang County, Henan) | | Dong Zhuo | | |
| Xun Tao 荀燾 | | | | Yingyin County, Yingchuan (Xuchang County, Henan) | | Han dynasty | | |
| Xun Wanchuan 覃萬傳 | | | | Nanzheng County, Hanzhong (Nanzheng District, Shaanxi) | General | Shu Han | | |
| Xun Wang 荀汪 | Mengci 孟慈 | | | Yingyin County, Yingchuan (Xuchang County, Henan) | Politician | Han dynasty | | |
| Xun Wei 荀緯 | Gonggao 公高 | 182 | 223 | Henai County (Jiaozuo, Wuzhi County, Henan) | Advisor, politician | Cao Wei | Han dynasty | |
| Xun Xu 荀勖 | Gongzeng 公曾 | | 289 | Yingyin County, Yingchuan (Xuchang County, Henan) | Politician | Jin dynasty | Cao Wei | Jin Shu vol. 39. |
| Xun Yan 荀衍 | Xiuruo 休若 | | | Yingyin County, Yingchuan (Xuchang County, Henan) | General | Han dynasty | | |
| Xun Yi 荀顗 | Jingqian 景倩 | | 274 | Yingyin County, Yingchuan (Xuchang County, Henan) | Politician | Jin dynasty | Cao Wei | Jin Shu vol. 39. |
| Xun Yi 荀霬 | | | | Yingyin County, Yingchuan (Xuchang County, Henan) | General | Cao Wei | | |
| Xun Yi 荀廙 | | | | | Politician | Cao Wei | | |
| Xun Yin 荀愔 | | | | Yingyin County, Yingchuan (Xuchang County, Henan) | Politician | Han dynasty | | |
| Xun You 荀攸 | Gongda 公達 | 157 | 214 | Yingyin County, Yingchuan (Xuchang County, Henan) | Advisor, politician | Cao Cao | Han dynasty | Sanguozhi vol. 10. |
| Xun Yu 荀彧 | Wenruo 文若 | 163 | 212 | Yingyin County, Yingchuan (Xuchang County, Henan) | Advisor, politician | Cao Cao | Han Fu, Yuan Shao | Houhanshu vol. 70; Sanguozhi vol. 10. |
| Xun Yu 荀俁 | Shuqian 叔倩 | | | Yingyin County, Yingchuan (Xuchang County, Henan) | Politician | Cao Wei | | |
| Xun Yu 荀寓 | Jingbo 景伯 | | | Yingyin County, Yingchuan (Xuchang County, Henan) | Politician | Jin dynasty | | |
| Xun Yu 荀禹 | | | | | General | Cao Wei | | |
| Xun Yue 荀悦 | Zhongyu 仲豫 | 148 | 209 | Yingyin County, Yingchuan (Xuchang County, Henan) | Politician, writer | Han dynasty | | Houhanshu vol. 62. |
| Xun Yun 荀惲 | Changqian 長倩 | | | Yingyin County, Yingchuan (Xuchang County, Henan) | General, politician | Cao Wei | | |
