= Chu Shi Biao =

Memorials written by Zhuge Liang (227–228)

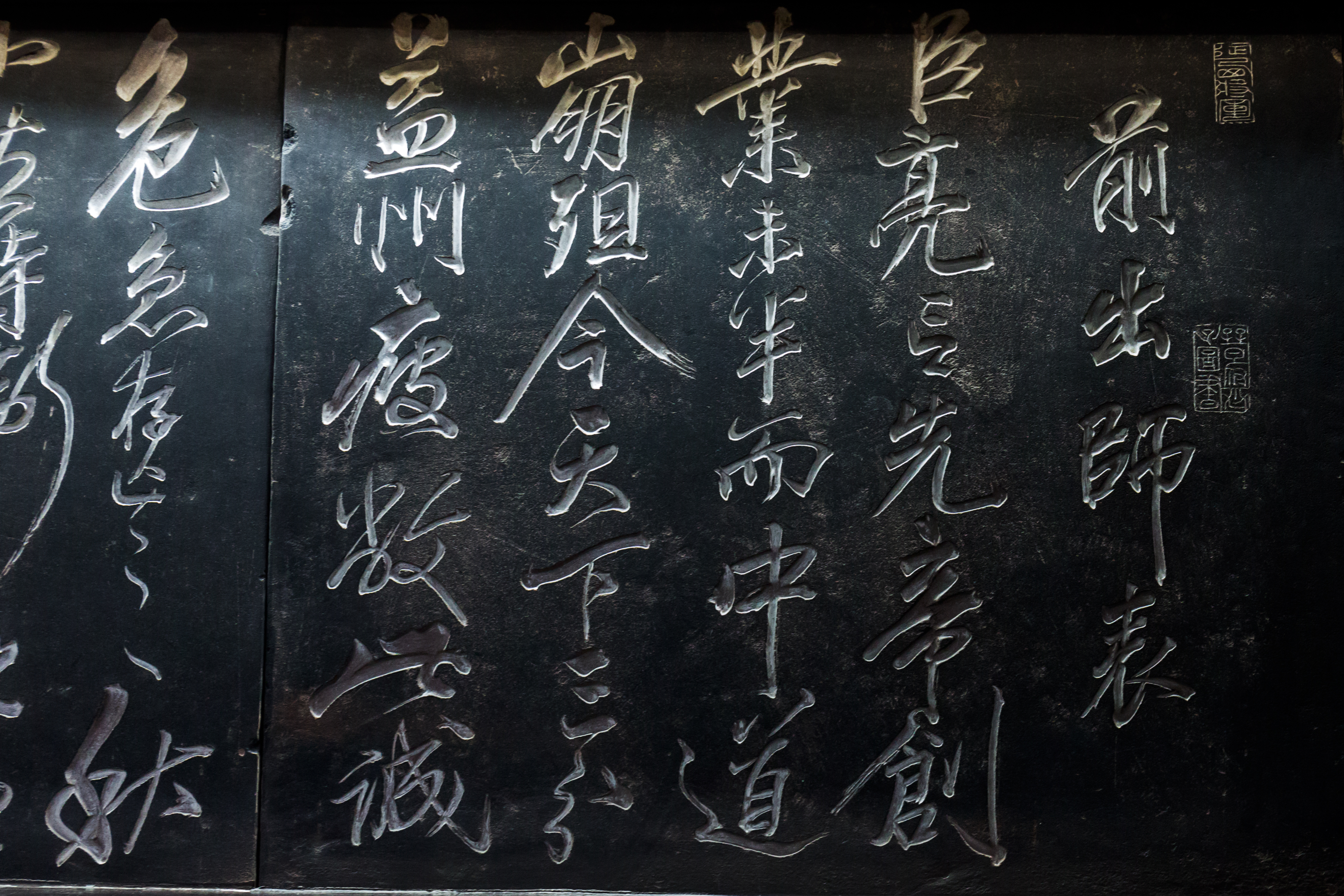
- The Former Chu Shi Biao engraved in the Temple of Marquis Wu, Chengdu, Sichuan
- Traditional Chinese: 出師表
- Simplified Chinese: 出师表
- Literal meaning: Memorial on the case to go to war
Transcriptions
Standard Mandarin
- Hanyu Pinyin: Chū Shī Biǎo
- Wade–Giles: Chu Shih Piao
Yue: Cantonese
- Jyutping: Ceot^{1} Si^{1} Biu^{2}

The Chu Shi Biao refers to either of two memorials written by Zhuge Liang, the imperial chancellor of the state of Shu during the Three Kingdoms period of China. He presented them to Liu Shan, the second emperor of Shu. The first Chu Shi Biao, which is referred to as the "Former Chu Shi Biao", was presented in 227 before Zhuge Liang embarked on the first of a series of military campaigns against Shu's rival state, Wei. The second, known as the "Later Chu Shi Biao", was purportedly submitted in 228 before Zhuge Liang left for the second Northern Expedition.

The main topics addressed in the Chu Shi Biao included the reasons for the campaigns, as well as Zhuge Liang's personal advice to Liu Shan on how to govern and rule the state.

The authenticity of the Later Chu Shi Biao is disputed and many scholars believe that it was not written by Zhuge Liang.

== Former Chu Shi Biao ==
The Former Chu Shi Biao was written in 227 and was recorded in Zhuge Liang's biography in the Sanguozhi.

At that time, Shu was recovering from its previous defeat at the Battle of Xiaoting in 222 and from the Southern Campaign against opposing forces in the south in 225. Zhuge Liang thought that Shu was weak so it had to be aggressive towards its rivals in order to survive. He decided to launch a campaign against Shu's rival state, Wei, in the north. This marked the start of a series of Shu invasions of Wei. Before leaving, Zhuge Liang wrote the Former Chu Shi Biao to the Shu emperor Liu Shan to explain the reasons for the campaign and to give his personal advice to Liu Shan on governance.

The Song dynasty poet Su Shi commented in the Yue Quan Xiansheng Wenji (樂全先生文集敘) that Zhuge Liang's (Former) Chu Shi Biao was "simple and concise, direct but not disrespectful."

=== Content ===
The following is a rough translation of the Former Chu Shi Biao. See the notes section for further explanation of certain parts in the text.

Your subject, Liang, (Note: "Liang" refers to Zhuge Liang) says: The Late Emperor (Note: The "Late Emperor" refers to Liu Bei, Shu's founding emperor. This memorial was addressed to Liu Shan, Liu Bei's son and successor. That was why the writer had to refer to Liu Bei as the "Late Emperor".) had yet to complete his great mission (Note: The "great mission" refers to Shu's goal of defeating its rival state Wei and restoring the Han dynasty. When Shu was founded in 221, Liu Bei saw his state as a legitimate successor to the Han dynasty because he descended from the imperial clan of the Han dynasty. He perceived the Wei rulers as "villains" who usurped the Han dynasty, and thus made it Shu's mission to defeat Wei and restore the Han dynasty.) when he passed away. This world is divided into three (Note: China was ruled by the Han dynasty until 220, when Cao Pi usurped the throne from Emperor Xian and ended the Han dynasty. Cao Pi then founded the state of Wei, an event marking the start of the Three Kingdoms period. A year later, Liu Bei declared himself emperor of Shu, and in 229, Sun Quan declared himself emperor of Wu. The former "Empire" of the Han dynasty was divided among the three states of Wei, Shu and Wu.) and Yi Province is in dire straits. This is a critical moment indeed. (Note: Shu was the weakest of the three states at the time (c. 228) because it lacked resources and manpower as it only controlled one province – Yi Province – while the other two states ruled more than one province each. Zhuge Liang advocated an aggressive foreign policy towards Wei, the most powerful of the three states, because he believed that it was critical to Shu's survival.) However, the ministers in the capital are not disheartened, and the loyal warriors outside the capital do not fear death. This is because they remember the generous treatment they received from the Late Emperor, and they wish to repay his kindness by serving Your Majesty well. It may be beneficial that Your Majesty welcome their views and opinions, promote the virtues of the Late Emperor, inspire those with lofty ambitions, and refrain from looking down on yourself or making inappropriate remarks that would discourage people from giving good advice.

Regardless of whether they serve in the Imperial Palace or in the Imperial Chancellor's Office, (Note: The "Imperial Palace" and "Imperial Chancellor's Office" referred to two different offices in the Shu central government in Chengdu. Those serving in the former reported directly to the emperor while those serving in the latter reported to the Imperial Chancellor, Zhuge Liang.) all officials are subjects of the State. Therefore, they should all be treated equally in terms of rewards and punishments. Any person who commits an offence or renders meritorious service to the State may be handed over to the appropriate authority, who will then make the decision on what punishment or reward to be given out. Doing so will exemplify Your Majesty as a wise and just ruler. It is best if Your Majesty do not show any form of bias or favouritism as it will distort the principles of fairness.

Palace Attendant Guo Youzhi, Fei Yi, and Dong Yun are examples of good and trustworthy ministers. They are loyal and faithful. That was why the Late Emperor selected them to assist Your Majesty. I believe that Your Majesty should discuss all major and minor state affairs with them before implementing any policies because this will help to cover up flaws and achieve greater efficiency.

General Xiang Chong is of good character and he is well-versed in military affairs. When he was given responsibilities in the past, the Late Emperor praised him as a capable person so everyone nominated him to be a Chief Controller. I feel that Your Majesty may discuss all military affairs with him, as this will promote cohesion within the armed forces and every person will receive an assignment corresponding to his ability.

The Former Han dynasty prospered because the rulers favoured virtuous ministers and alienated petty and corrupt officials; the Later Han dynasty declined because the rulers favoured petty and corrupt officials and alienated virtuous ministers. When the Late Emperor was still living, he would often discuss these topics with me, and he expressed grief and regret when we spoke of Huan and Ling. (Note: "Huan" and "Ling" refer to Emperor Huan of Han and Emperor Ling of Han respectively. These two emperors are widely held responsible for the decline of the Han dynasty and its eventual downfall.) The Palace Attendants, Masters of Writing, Chief Clerks, and Army Advisers are all loyal and capable subjects who are willing to die for Your Majesty. I hope that Your Majesty will be close to them and will place your faith in them. In this way, the Han dynasty will be revived very soon.

I was of humble origin, and used to lead the life of a peasant in Nanyang. (Note: "Nanyang" refers to Nanyang Commandery, which is located around present-day Nanyang, Henan.) In those days, I only hoped to survive in such a chaotic era. I did not aspire to become famous among nobles and aristocrats. The Late Emperor did not look down on me because of my background. He humbled himself and visited me thrice in the thatched cottage, where he consulted me on the affairs of our time. (Note: Liu Bei visited Zhuge Liang thrice in the latter's house (a "thatched cottage") and their conversation led to the Longzhong Plan. See also Three Visits.) I was so deeply touched that I promised to do my best for the Late Emperor. We encountered hard times and setbacks later. I was given heavy responsibilities when we were facing defeats. I received important duties in dangerous and difficult situations. It has been 21 years since then.

The Late Emperor knew that I am cautious and prudent, so before he passed away, he entrusted me with the duty to complete his great mission. Ever since I received that heavy responsibility, I have been feeling uneasy day and night, because I fear that I may not accomplish the mission well and will tarnish the Late Emperor's judgment and faith in me. In the fifth month, I crossed the Lu and entered barren and treacherous lands. Now that the rebellions in the south have been pacified (Note: The "Lu" refers to the area around present-day Lushui County in Yunnan, which was historically located in the southern part of Shu. Some local governors in that area rebelled against Shu, and tribal peoples (known as the Nanman) often intruded into the area. In 225, Zhuge Liang led a Southern Campaign to suppress the revolts and pacify the region, because he felt that internal stability in Shu must be achieved first before they could concentrate on attacking Wei.) and we have sufficient military resources, it is time to increase the troops' morale and lead them north to reclaim the Central Plains. I only hope to use the best of my ability to eliminate our evil enemies, (Note: The "evil enemies" refer to Shu's rival state Wei.) to restore the Han dynasty, and to return to the old capital. (Note: The "old capital" refers to Luoyang, the former capital of the Han dynasty.) It is my duty to repay the Late Emperor's kindness and prove my loyalty to Your Majesty. The responsibilities of Guo Youzhi, Fei Yi, Dong Yun and others are to assist Your Majesty in administrating state affairs and to provide good advice.

I hope that Your Majesty will assign me the mission of eliminating the villains (Note: The "villains" refer to the state of Wei, which was founded in 220 after Cao Pi usurped the throne from Emperor Xian, the last emperor of the Han dynasty. Shu regarded Wei as a "villain" who usurped the Han dynasty.) and restoring the Han dynasty. If I fail, Your Majesty should punish me in order to answer to the Late Emperor. If Your Majesty does not receive honest and loyal advice, please punish Guo Youzhi, Fei Yi and Dong Yun for not performing their duties well, so as to highlight their mistakes. Your Majesty should also make plans for yourself, search for the best way to govern the state, and accept good advice. I feel very honoured and grateful to be able to pursue the Late Emperor's final wish.

I am going to leave Your Majesty soon. Now, as I read this memorial, I am unable to hold back my tears and I do not know what to say.

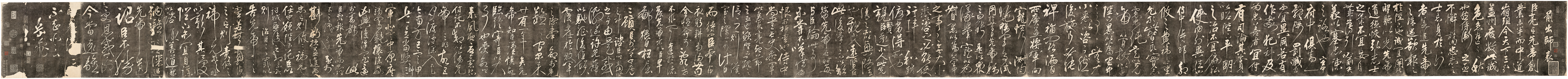
The Former Chu Shi Biao in Yue Fei's hand, engraved in the Temple of Marquis Wu, Wuzhang Plains

== Later Chu Shi Biao ==
The Later Chu Shi Biao was written in 228 and was not recorded in the original version of the Sanguozhi by Chen Shou. When Pei Songzhi made annotations to the Sanguozhi, he wrote that the Later Chu Shi Biao came from the Mo Ji (默記) by Zhang Yan (張儼). The Later Chu Shi Biao was incorporated into the Han Jin Chunqiu (漢晉春秋) by Xi Zuochi.

Many scholars have cast doubts on the authorship of the Later Chu Shi Biao and believed that it was not written by Zhuge Liang. The Qing dynasty scholar Qian Dazhao (錢大昭) expressed suspicion in his book Sanguozhi Bianyi (三國志辨疑; Doubts on Records of the Three Kingdoms). The Later Chu Shi Biao was not part of a collection of writings by Zhuge Liang, and appeared only in Zhang Yan's Mo Ji. Besides, the tone in the Later Chu Shi Biao differs largely from the Former Chu Shi Biao; the latter sounded more coercive while the former appeared more sincere and humble. The latter even included the use of analogies and historical examples in the third paragraph to urge war. It also contains a discrepancy about Zhao Yun's death: Zhao Yun died in 229, but the Later Chu Shi Biao, purportedly written in 228, already mentioned his death.

=== Content ===
The following is a rough translation of the Later Chu Shi Biao. See the notes section for further explanation of certain parts in the text.

The Late Emperor considered that the Han (Note: The "Han" refers to the Han dynasty. When Shu was founded in 222, it saw itself as a legitimate successor to the Han dynasty because its founder, Liu Bei, was a descendant of the imperial clan of the Han dynasty.) and the villains cannot coexist, and that our state cannot be content with only internal stability, hence he tasked me with attacking the villains. Based on the Late Emperor's assessment of my ability, he already knew that I was weak and not capable of standing against a powerful enemy. However, if we do not attack the enemy, our state will be in greater peril. Should we wait for death or should we preempt the enemy? The Late Emperor did not hesitate in entrusting me with this responsibility.

When I first received the mission, I was unable to sleep or dine in peace. When I considered attacking the north, I felt that we should pacify the south first. In the fifth month, I crossed the Lu and entered barren and treacherous lands. I had a meal only every two days. This was not because I do not love myself. We cannot hope to be safe by just remaining in Shu, so I have to brave danger to fulfil the Late Emperor's dying wish. However, there are some who argue that this is not the best plan. As of now, the enemy is busy in the west (Note: The "enemy is busy in the west" refers to the situation in 228, when three commanderies – Nan'an, Tianshui and Anding – in the Guanzhong region (located near the western border of Wei) rebelled and defected to Shu. (See the Tianshui revolts.) The Wei government sent Zhang He to lead an army to suppress the revolts.) and occupied in the east. (Note: The "occupied in the east" refers to the situation in 228 when the forces of Wei and Wu clashed at the Battle of Shiting at the southeastern border of Wei.) According to military strategy, the best time to attack an enemy is when they are tired and weary, and now is the best time for us to launch a swift attack on them.

Please allow me to explain further as follows: Emperor Gao's (Note: "Emperor Gao" refers to Emperor Gao (Liu Bang), the founding emperor of the Han dynasty.) wisdom can be compared to the radiance of the sun and the moon. His strategists were very learned and far-sighted. However, he still had to go through difficulties and suffer some setbacks before he could achieve peace. As of now, Your Majesty is far from Emperor Gao, your advisers are not comparable to Liang and Ping, (Note: "Liang" refers to Zhang Liang while "Ping" refers to Chen Ping. Both of them served Emperor Gao as advisers and helped him defeat his rival Xiang Yu in the Chu–Han Contention.) yet Your Majesty intends to employ a long-term strategy to achieve victory and pacify the Empire smoothly. This is the first thing I do not understand. (Note: The Chinese term 未解 is usually translated to mean "cannot understand". However, the Yuan dynasty historian Hu Sanxing commented that 解 could be also interpreted in the same way as 懈, which means "do not dare to be remiss".) Liu Yao and Wang Lang (Note: Liu Yao and Wang Lang were two regional officials (or warlords) who controlled territories in the Jiangdong region in the late 190s.) each controlled provinces and commanderies. When they were discussing strategies to maintain peace, they often claimed to be following the ways of the ancient sages, but they were actually filled with doubts and worries. They were unwilling to go to war year after year, so Sun Ce gradually became more powerful and he eventually conquered Jiangdong. (Note: The territories in the Jiangdong region, initially controlled by warlords such as Liu Yao and Wang Lang, were conquered by Sun Ce in a series of wars between 194 and 199. The conquered lands served as the foundation of the state of Eastern Wu, which was founded by Sun Ce's younger brother Sun Quan.) This is the second thing I do not understand. Cao Cao was very intelligent and his expertise in military affairs is comparable to that of Sun and Wu. (Note: "Sun" refers to Sun Wu (better known as Sun Tzu) while "Wu" refers to Wu Qi. Both Sun Wu and Wu Qi were renowned military strategists in ancient China.) He faced dangerous and difficult situations in Nanyang, (Note: Refers to the Battle of Wancheng in 197, fought between Cao Cao and Zhang Xiu. Cao Cao lost the battle. Wancheng was located in Nanyang Commandery (near present-day Nanyang, Henan).) Wuchao, (Note: Refers to the Battle of Guandu in 200 CE, fought between Cao Cao and Yuan Shao. The decisive turning point in the battle was a raid by Cao Cao's forces on Yuan Shao's supply depot at Wuchao, which was crucial to Cao Cao's victory over Yuan Shao.) Qilian, (Note: According to the Yuan dynasty historian Hu Sansheng (or Hu Sanxing), the "Qilian" refers to Mount Qi, located near Ye (southeast of present-day Ci County, Handan, Hebei). In 204, during the Battle of Ye, Cao Cao besieged Ye, which was held by forces under Yuan Shao's son Yuan Shang. Yuan Shang lost and retreated to Mount Qi at the south of Ye, where he was defeated by Cao Cao again. Cao Cao then besieged Ye once more, and was nearly killed by Shen Pei's archers, who were lying in ambush.) Liyang, (Note: Refers to the Battle of Liyang of 202–203, fought between Cao Cao and Yuan Shang. Cao Cao attacked Yuan Shang several times but failed to defeat Yuan, and eventually withdrew his forces.) and Beishan, (Note: Refers to an event in the Hanzhong Campaign in 219. Cao Cao led an army from Xie Valley to Beishan in Yangping (west of present-day Mian County, Shaanxi) and fought with Liu Bei for control of Hanzhong Commandery. Cao Cao was unable to defeat Liu Bei and eventually retreated to Chang'an.) and nearly lost his life at Tong Pass, (Note: Refers to the Battle of Tong Pass in 211, fought between Cao Cao and a coalition of northwestern warlords led by Ma Chao. Cao Cao nearly lost his life in one encounter with Ma Chao during the battle.) but managed to achieve stability for a period of time. (Note: Refers to the situation in the 210s, when Cao Cao had already united northern China under his control, and was even given the title of a vassal king – "King of Wei" – by Emperor Xian of Han. Most of the territories controlled by Cao Cao were enjoying relative stability at that time, except at the borders.) I am not very capable, but I still braved danger to bring peace and stability. This is the third thing I do not understand. Cao Cao attacked Chang Ba five times but failed; (Note: "Chang Ba" (昌霸) is another name for Chang Xi (昌豨), a former bandit who submitted to Cao Cao and became a governor under Cao. However, Chang Xi rebelled against Cao Cao many times, each time after he agreed to surrender to Cao Cao. He was eventually killed by Cao Cao's general Yu Jin.) he attempted to cross the Chao Lake four times but was not successful. (Note: The Chao Lake is located in present-day Anhui, and was situated on the border between the domains of Cao Cao and Sun Quan. In his whole life, Cao Cao had led four campaigns to attack Sun Quan but all of them were unsuccessful, and most of the battles took place near the Chao Lake.) He appointed Li Fu as an official but Li Fu plotted against him; (Note: Li Fu (李服) was also known as "Wang Fu" (王服) and "Wang Zifu" (王子服). In 199, Li Fu plotted with Dong Cheng, Liu Bei and others to kill Cao Cao, but the plot failed and Cao Cao had most of the conspirators killed.) he employed Xiahou but Xiahou was defeated and killed in action. (Note: "Xiahou" refers to Xiahou Yuan. Cao Cao left Xiahou Yuan to defend Hanzhong commandery in 216. In 217, Liu Bei launched the Hanzhong Campaign to seize control of Hanzhong from Cao Cao. Xiahou Yuan was killed in action at the Battle of Mount Dingjun in 219 by Liu Bei's general Huang Zhong.) The Late Emperor often said that Cao Cao was very capable but he still had his fair share of losses. My ability is poor, so how can I be assured that I will secure victory? This is the fourth thing I do not understand. I have been in Hanzhong for about a year now. (Note: Zhuge Liang led Shu forces back to Hanzhong and garrisoned there after the Shu defeat at the Battle of Jieting in (early) 228.) During this year, I lost Zhao Yun, Yang Qun, Ma Yu, Yan Zhi, Ding Li, Bai Shou, Liu He, Deng Tong, and over 70 officers in total, (Note: Zhao Yun, Yang Qun and the others named here were all well known military officers in Shu.) as well as many tujiang and wuqian. (Note: Tujiang (突將) and wuqian (無前) refer to elite units in the Shu army.) The cong, sou, qingqiang, sanqi and wuqi, numbering over 1,000, was formed over a period of 10 years by recruiting the best from many places, and not just from only one province or one commandery. (Note: The cong (賨), sou (叟) and qingqiang (青羌) refer to divisions in the Shu military made up of soldiers recruited from ethnic minorities such as the Qiang people. The sanqi (散騎) and wuqi (武騎) refer to cavalry divisions in the Shu army. These divisions were all regarded as elite forces in the Shu military, and many of them were recruited from other areas outside of Yi Province, the heartland of Shu.) A few years from now, we will lose two thirds of what we have now. By then, what do we still have to fight our enemy with? This is the fifth thing I do not understand. Now, our people and our troops are weary, but war cannot cease. War cannot cease. The efforts and amount of resources we pump into an offensive approach towards the enemy are the same as if we were to adopt a defensive strategy and wait for the enemy to attack us. Why do we not attack the enemy now, and instead, pit the strength of our one province against them? This is the sixth thing I do not understand.

War is very unpredictable. When the Late Emperor was defeated in Chu, (Note: "Chu" is another name for Jing Province. In 208, Cao Cao led his forces south to attack Jing Province and defeated Liu Bei at the Battle of Changban. Changban was within the vicinity of Chu (Jing Province).) Cao Cao clapped his hands in joy and claimed that the Empire has been pacified. However, the Late Emperor later allied with Wu and Yue, (Note: "Wu" and "Yue" refer to Eastern Wu, which covered the Wuyue region. Liu Bei formed an alliance with Sun Quan, whose domain was referred to as "Wu", in 208 and they defeated Cao Cao at the Battle of Red Cliffs later that year.) seized Ba and Shu in the west, (Note: Refers to Liu Bei's takeover of Yi Province from the warlord Liu Zhang between 202 and 205.) and led his forces to attack the north, and Xiahou lost his head. Cao had miscalculated, and it seemed that the great mission was about to be completed. However, later, Wu broke the alliance, Guan Yu was destroyed, (Note: Sun Quan broke his alliance with Liu Bei in 219 and sent his general Lü Meng to invade Liu Bei's territories in Jing Province, which were defended by Guan Yu. Guan Yu lost Jing Province in the surprise attack and was captured and killed by Sun Quan's forces. See Lü Meng's invasion of Jing Province.) we suffered losses at Zigui, (Note: Refers to the Battle of Xiaoting of 221–222, fought between Shu and Wu, which concluded with defeat for Shu. Zigui (north of present-day Yichang, Hubei) was one of the battlegrounds in that war.) and Cao Pi declared himself emperor. (Note: In 220, Cao Cao's son Cao Pi forced Emperor Xian to abdicate in his favour, ending the Han dynasty and establishing the state of Wei.) All things are like that; they are very unpredictable. I shall bend to the task until I am worn out, and not stop until I am dead. My ability is limited and does not permit me to foresee whether the future will be a smooth or an arduous journey, and whether we will succeed or not.

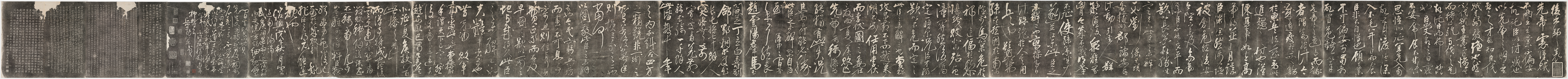
The Later Chu Shi Biao in Yue Fei's hand, engraved in the Temple of Marquis Wu, Wuzhang Plains

== Legacy ==
The phrase "Han and traitors cannot together stand" (漢賊不兩立 (Hàn zéi bù liǎng lì)) from the Later Chu Shi Biao is later used to describe a situation where two opposing powers cannot coexist. The phrase was famously invoked by Chiang Kai-shek in 1961 to describe the Republic of China's stance against the People's Republic of China being represented in international organizations.

Another phrase "with deference and prudence, to the state of one's depletion; it's never finished until one's death" (鞠躬盡瘁，死而後已 (jū gōng jìn cuì, sǐ ér hòu yǐ)) from the Later Chu Shi Biao is later used to describe one's commitment to strive to the utmost.
