= Longzhong =

Scenic area in Xiangyang, Hubei, China

Coordinates: 32°00′N 112°02′E

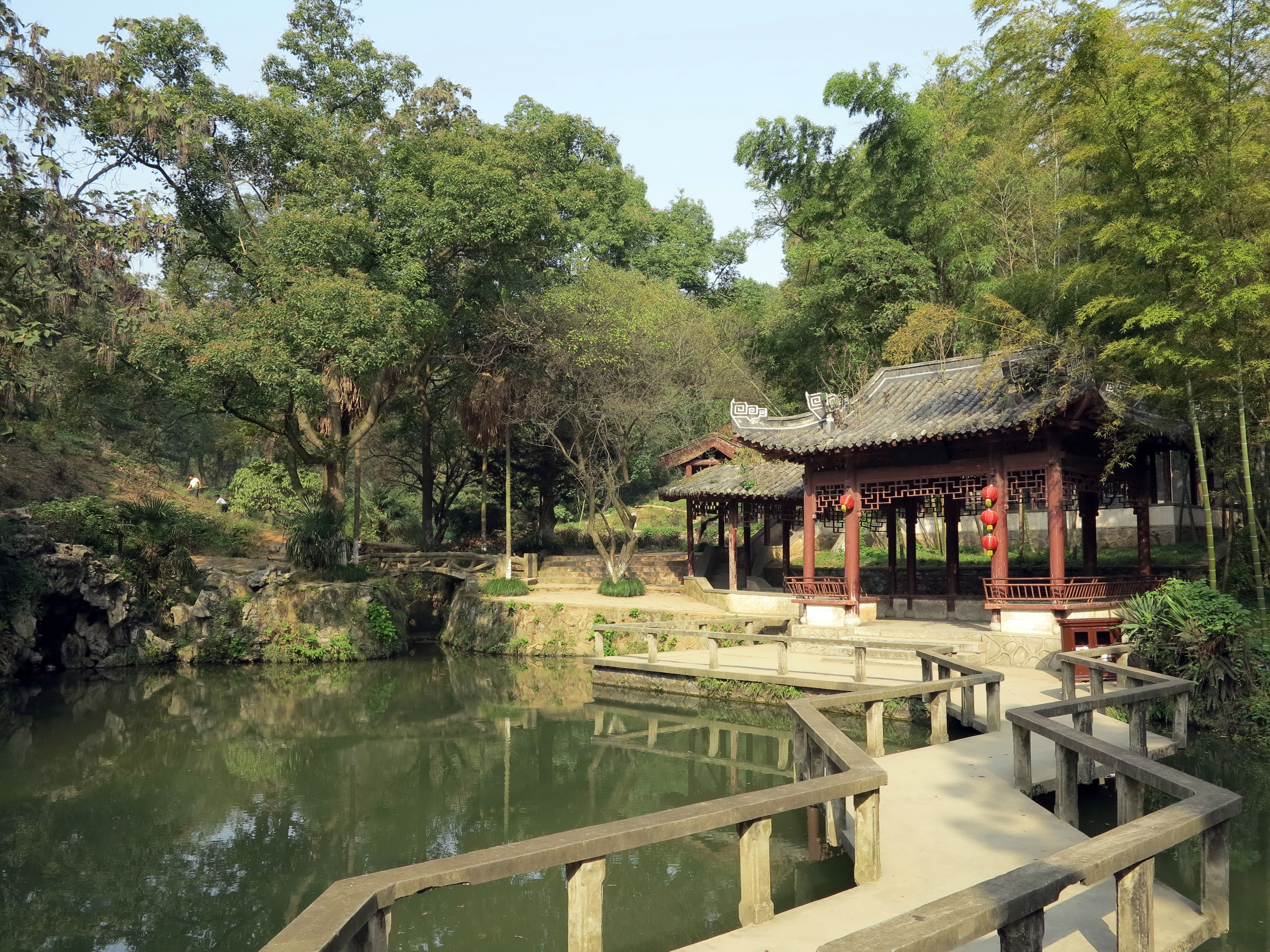
Longzhong in the suburb of Xiangyang

Longzhong (Chinese: 隆中; pinyin: Lóngzhōng) is a scenic area with total area of 209 square kilometres (81 sq mi) located approximately 13 kilometres (8.1 mi) away from Xiangyang, Hubei, China. It is known as the former home of the Three Kingdoms-era strategist Zhuge Liang.

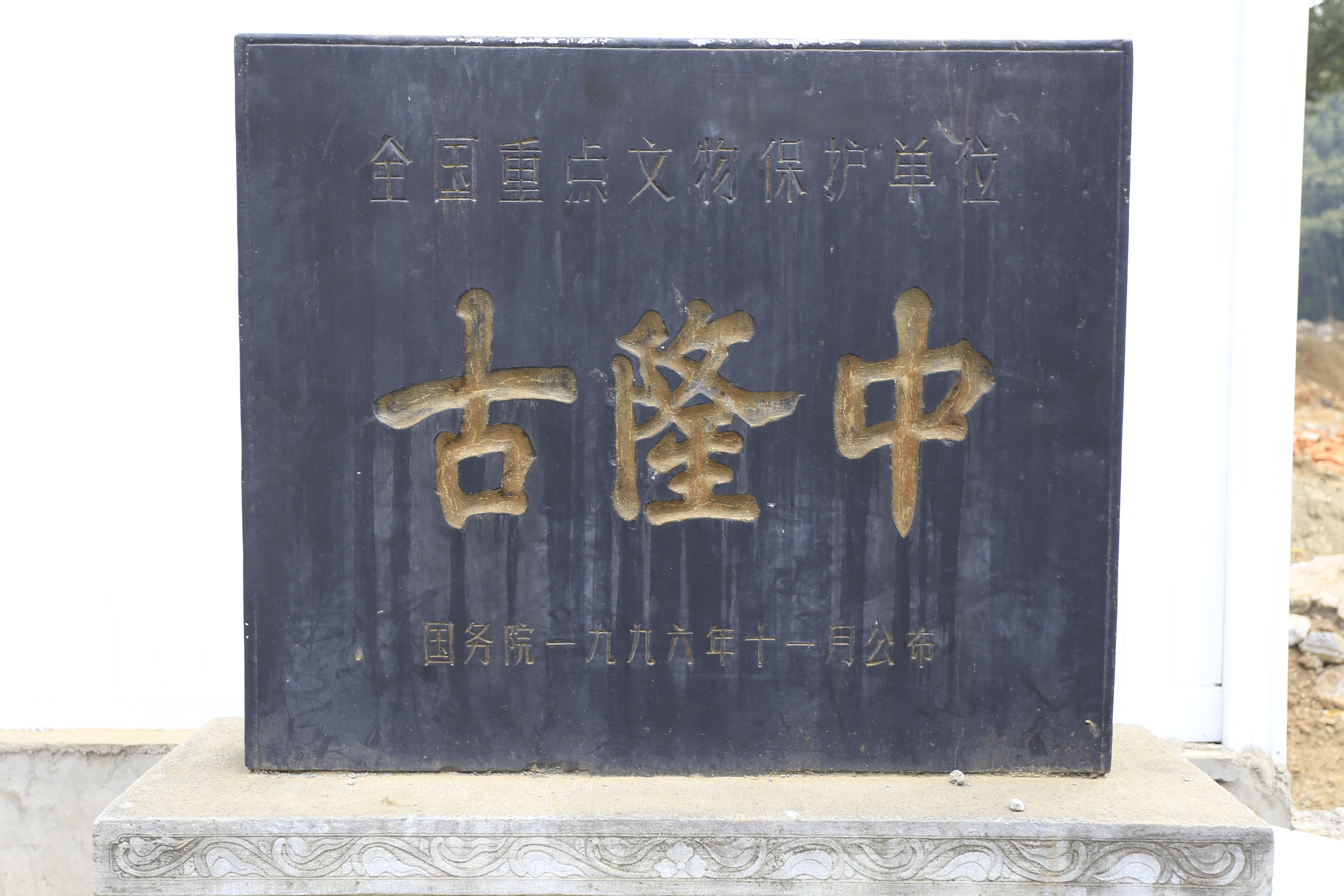
Longzhong is the former home of the Three Kingdoms-era strategist Zhuge Liang, near Xiangyang

== History ==
The famous statesman Zhuge Liang from the Three Kingdoms period of Chinese history lived in Longzhong seclusively for more than ten years. It is where Liu Bei met Zhuge Liang and the story of the Three Visits occurred. Liu Bei made three trips before he was able to see Zhuge Liang. On the third visit, Zhuge Liang, thankful for the courtesy, showed Liu Bei the Longzhong Plan, a long-term strategy that outlined how Liu Bei could compete with Cao Cao. This episode gave the birth to a modern Chinese idiom, "to visit the thatched cottage three times" (三顧茅廬), which means to repeatedly request somebody to take up a responsible post.

== Description ==
The Longzhong scenic area consists of man-made landscapes as well as beautiful natural environments. The Ming dynasty had already formed the “Longzhong Ten Scenes”, which include Caolu Ting, Gonggeng Tian, Sangu Tang, Xiao Hongqiao, Liujiao Jin, Wuhou Ci, Banyue Xi, Laolong Dong, Liangfu Yan and Baoqi Shi. After the establishment of the People's Republic of China, more human landscapes have been built inside the Longzhong scenic area, like Zhuge Caolu and Guanxing Tai. In 1994, Longzhong was listed as national key scenic spots in China, and in 1996, it was designated as the national key cultural heritage protection units.
