= Xiang Chong =

Xiang Chong may refer to:

- Xiang Chong (Water Margin) (項充), a fictional character in the Water Margin
- Xiang Chong (Three Kingdoms) (向寵), Shu Han general of the Three Kingdoms period
