= Xie Jing =

Xie Jing may refer to:

- Xie Jing (badminton) (born 1990), a badminton player in the 2010 China Badminton Super League
- Xie Jing (Shufa) (3rd century), a politician from the Three Kingdoms, China
- Xie Jing (3rd century), a general from the Three Kingdoms, China
