= Guo Youzhi =

3rd century Shu Han state official

- 郭攸之

Palace Attendant (侍中)
- In office ?–?
- Monarch: Liu Shan

Gentleman of the Yellow Gate (黃門侍郎)
- In office 224–?
- Monarch: Liu Shan

Registrar (主簿)
- In office ?–?
- Monarch: Liu Shan

Personal details
- Born: Unknown Nanyang, Henan
- Died: Unknown
- Occupation: Official
- Courtesy name: Yanchang (演長)

Guo Youzhi (fl. third century), courtesy name Yanchang, was an official of the state of Shu Han in the Three Kingdoms period (220–280) of China. Zhuge Liang, the Imperial Chancellor of Shu, described Guo Youzhi in the Chu Shi Biao as exceedingly loyal and faithful, and named him along with Dong Yun and Fei Yi as the more competent officials in Shu while advising the Shu emperor Liu Shan to make good use of their talents. But he only as a reservist when Zhuge Liang's Northern Expeditions due to his obedient personality.

== See also ==
- Lists of people of the Three Kingdoms
