= Yulin Township, Xuchang =

Yulin Township 榆林乡
- Township
- Location in Henan
- Coordinates: 33°55′24″N 113°43′57″E
- Country: People's Republic of China
- Province: Henan
- Prefecture-level city: Xuchang
- District: Jian'an District
- Time zone: UTC+8 (China Standard)

Yulin Township (simplified Chinese: 榆林乡; traditional Chinese: 榆林鄉; pinyin: Yúlín Xiāng) is a township under the administration of Jian'an District, Xuchang, Henan, China. As of 2018, it has two residential communities and 29 villages under its administration.
