= Xu Ci =

3rd century Shu Han official and scholar

- 許慈

Empress's Chamberlain (大長秋)
- In office ?–?
- Monarch: Liu Shan

Personal details
- Born: Unknown Nanyang, Henan
- Died: Unknown
- Children: Xu Xun
- Occupation: Official, scholar
- Courtesy name: Rendu (仁篤)

Xu Ci (fl. third century), courtesy name Rendu, was an official and scholar of the state of Shu Han in the Three Kingdoms period of China. An outsider to the province, he and Hu Qian's disorderly conduct would hamper a scholarly project and see his superior put on a play mocking the poor conduct of those involved.

== Life ==
Xu Ci was from Nanyang Commandery (南陽郡), which is around present-day Nanyang, Henan. He was born sometime in the late Eastern Han dynasty and had studied under the tutelage of Liu Xi (劉熈). He specialised in the teachings of the Confucian scholar Zheng Xuan, the Yijing, Book of Documents, Etiquette and Ceremonial, Book of Rites, Rites of Zhou, Mao Commentary and Analects of Confucius. Sometime between 196 and 220, he met Xu Jing and others in Jiao Province (covering parts of present-day Guangxi, Guangdong and northern Vietnam) and later accompanied them to Yi Province (covering present-day Sichuan and Chongqing).

In 214, after the warlord Liu Bei seized control of Yi Province from its governor, Liu Zhang, he saw that Confucian customs and education in the province were very disorderly due to years of neglect. He wanted to revive Confucianism in Yi Province and establish a set of rituals and procedures for the region, so he set up an education office to oversee this project. Apart from building up a library of Confucian texts, Liu Bei also appointed Xu Ci and Hu Qian as academicians (博士), serving at the academy, and ordered them to work with other scholars such as Meng Guang and Lai Min on this project.

While the project was still in its initial stage of development, bitter disagreements and quarrels broke out among the scholars due to differences in opinion. Xu Ci and Hu Qian started making accusations and taking petty revenge against each other including withholding books. They bickered among themselves and constantly sought opportunities to provoke each other. They also praised themselves and scorned their colleagues. When Liu Bei heard about it, he came up with an idea to urge them to put aside their differences and cooperate with each other. He gathered all the officials for a feast and had actors put on a skit parodying the conflict between Xu Ci and Hu Qian, showing how a war of words between them led to them using weapons to attack each other. Despite Liu Bei's efforts, the project ultimately turned out to be a failure.

Hu Qian died before Xu Ci in an unknown year. Following the end of the Eastern Han dynasty in 220, Xu Ci was consulted by officials on the proper rites for establishing an Emperor, served in the state of Shu Han, founded by Liu Bei in 221, during the Three Kingdoms period. After Liu Bei's death in 223, Xu Ci continued serving under Liu Shan, Liu Bei's son and successor. During Liu Shan's reign, he held the appointment of Empress's Chamberlain (大長秋). He died in an unknown year.

Xu Ci's son, Xu Xun (許勛), inherited his father's legacy and served as an academician (博士) in Shu.. In Xu Ci's biography is placed another non-native scholar living in Yi Province called one Hu Qian (胡潛), whose courtesy name was Gongxing (公興). Nobody knew why Hu Qian left his home in Wei Commandery (魏郡; around present-day Handan, Hebei) and travelled all the way to Yi Province. While Hu Qian was not as well-read and knowledgeable as the others, he was intelligent and had a very good memory. He memorised and knew by heart everything about Confucian rites, rituals, procedures, protocol, etc., ranging from ancestral worship to the five types of mourning attire. (Note: The historian Sun Sheng pointed out that Chen Shou embedded Hu Qian's biography in Xu Ci's biography in the Records of the Three Kingdoms because there were too few notable scholars in Shu (and too little information about them), so it did not make sense to have individual biographies for all of them.)

== Appraisal ==
Chen Shou noted Xu Ci had broad knowledge and experience, a learned man of his age while the Jin historian and critic Sun Sheng remarked, such men being hired by Liu Bei reflected the lack of scholars in Shu-Han. J. Michael Farmer notes Chen Shou focused on their characters rather than their intellectual contributions, using a humorous story to highlight their pettiness. Chen Shou also used Xu Ci and Hu Qian to assert the supremacy of his local intellectual tradition over that of outside scholars from the Central Plains. He also used Xu Ci and Hu Qian to show the poor state of intellectual affairs in the early years of Shu Han with the concern of Liu Bei about it. In the debate on the way Zheng Xuan's work gained influence in the Chengdu area, Yoshikawa Tadao argues Xu Ci played a key role in bringing its influence to the province.

== See also ==
- Lists of people of the Three Kingdoms
