= Shuangmiao Township, Pingyu County =

Shuangmiao Township 双庙乡
- Township
- Location in Henan
- Coordinates: 32°55′23″N 114°44′25″E
- Country: People's Republic of China
- Province: Henan
- Prefecture-level city: Zhumadian
- County: Pingyu
- Elevation: 45 m (148 ft)
- Time zone: UTC+8 (China Standard)

Shuangmiao Township (simplified Chinese: 双庙乡; traditional Chinese: 雙廟鄉; pinyin: Shuāngmiào Xiāng; lit. 'double temple') is a township of Pingyu County in southeastern Henan province, China, located about 10 kilometres (6.2 mi) southeast of the county seat. As of 2011, it has 7 villages under its administration.

== See also ==
- List of township-level divisions of Henan
