= Pingyu County =

Pingyu County 平舆县
- County
- Location within Henan
- Coordinates: 32°57′47″N 114°37′08″E
- Country: People's Republic of China
- Province: Henan
- Prefecture-level city: Zhumadian

Area
  - Total: 1,285 km^{2} (496 sq mi)

Population (2019)
  - Total: 714,100
  - Density: 555.7/km^{2} (1,439/sq mi)
- Time zone: UTC+8 (China Standard)
- Postal code: 463400
- Website: www.pingyu.gov.cn

Pingyu County (simplified Chinese: 平舆县; traditional Chinese: 平輿縣; pinyin: Píngyú Xiàn) is a county of Henan province, China, bordering Anhui province to the east. It is under the administration of Zhumadian city.

== Notable people ==
It is the hometown of the following people:

- Chen Fan and Xi Zhong, who were famous Chinese historical persons
- Chen Quanguo, the Chinese Communist Party Politburo member

Pingyu County is also the birthplace of the Chinese surnames Shěn and Ran.

== Administrative divisions ==
As of 2017, this county is divided to 3 subdistricts, 11 towns and 5 townships.

Subdistricts

- Guhuai Subdistrict (古槐街道)
- Qinghe Subdistrict (清河街道)
- Donghuang Subdistrict (东皇街道)

Towns

- Yangbu (杨埠镇)
- Donghedian (东和店镇)
- Miaowan (庙湾镇)
- Sheqiao (射桥镇)
- Xiyangdian (西洋店镇)
- Yangcheng (阳城镇)
- Guolou Township (郭楼镇)
- Litun Township (李屯镇)
- Wanjindian Township (万金店镇)
- Gaoyangdian Township (高杨店乡)
- Wanzhong Township (万冢乡)

Townships

- Shizilu Township (十字路乡)
- Yuhuangmiao Township (玉皇庙乡)
- Laowanggang Township (老王岗乡)
- Xindian Township (辛店乡)
- Shuangmiao Township (双庙乡)

== Climate ==
Climate data for Pingyu, elevation 45 m (148 ft), (1991–2020 normals, extremes 1981–present)
| Month | Jan | Feb | Mar | Apr | May | Jun | Jul | Aug | Sep | Oct | Nov | Dec | Year |
|---|---|---|---|---|---|---|---|---|---|---|---|---|---|
| Record high °C (°F) | 21.1 (70.0) | 26.6 (79.9) | 33.7 (92.7) | 33.2 (91.8) | 37.3 (99.1) | 39.0 (102.2) | 40.0 (104.0) | 39.7 (103.5) | 37.5 (99.5) | 34.6 (94.3) | 28.6 (83.5) | 21.6 (70.9) | 40.0 (104.0) |
| Mean daily maximum °C (°F) | 6.6 (43.9) | 10.1 (50.2) | 15.3 (59.5) | 21.7 (71.1) | 27.2 (81.0) | 31.3 (88.3) | 32.2 (90.0) | 31.1 (88.0) | 27.6 (81.7) | 22.5 (72.5) | 15.3 (59.5) | 8.8 (47.8) | 20.8 (69.5) |
| Daily mean °C (°F) | 1.6 (34.9) | 4.7 (40.5) | 9.8 (49.6) | 15.8 (60.4) | 21.2 (70.2) | 25.8 (78.4) | 27.6 (81.7) | 26.4 (79.5) | 22.0 (71.6) | 16.5 (61.7) | 9.8 (49.6) | 3.7 (38.7) | 15.4 (59.7) |
| Mean daily minimum °C (°F) | −2.2 (28.0) | 0.5 (32.9) | 5.0 (41.0) | 10.5 (50.9) | 16.0 (60.8) | 20.9 (69.6) | 23.9 (75.0) | 22.9 (73.2) | 17.9 (64.2) | 12.0 (53.6) | 5.5 (41.9) | −0.2 (31.6) | 11.1 (51.9) |
| Record low °C (°F) | −15.0 (5.0) | −15.3 (4.5) | −6.6 (20.1) | −1.0 (30.2) | 5.3 (41.5) | 12.3 (54.1) | 17.7 (63.9) | 13.3 (55.9) | 8.7 (47.7) | −0.3 (31.5) | −8.2 (17.2) | −16.0 (3.2) | −16.0 (3.2) |
| Average precipitation mm (inches) | 22.1 (0.87) | 25.4 (1.00) | 44.0 (1.73) | 55.5 (2.19) | 84.3 (3.32) | 146.4 (5.76) | 205.0 (8.07) | 136.3 (5.37) | 78.2 (3.08) | 54.5 (2.15) | 40.6 (1.60) | 18.1 (0.71) | 910.4 (35.85) |
| Average precipitation days (≥ 0.1 mm) | 6.0 | 6.7 | 7.5 | 7.4 | 9.9 | 8.5 | 11.0 | 10.5 | 8.5 | 7.9 | 6.9 | 5.3 | 96.1 |
| Average snowy days | 4.4 | 3.4 | 1.1 | 0 | 0 | 0 | 0 | 0 | 0 | 0 | 0.7 | 2.1 | 11.7 |
| Average relative humidity (%) | 71 | 71 | 71 | 72 | 72 | 72 | 82 | 84 | 79 | 73 | 72 | 70 | 74 |
| Mean monthly sunshine hours | 114.4 | 119.7 | 154.7 | 184.6 | 190.9 | 169.4 | 186.7 | 175.2 | 149.8 | 143.3 | 132.6 | 125.3 | 1,846.6 |
| Percentage possible sunshine | 36 | 38 | 41 | 47 | 44 | 40 | 43 | 43 | 41 | 41 | 43 | 41 | 42 |
Source: China Meteorological Administration all-time January high
