= Xiang Lang =

Chinese official and scholar (died 247)

- 向朗

General of the Left (左將軍)
- In office 234 – ?
- Monarch: Liu Shan

Minister of the Household (光祿勳)
- In office ? – 234
- Monarch: Liu Shan
- Chancellor: Zhuge Liang

Chief Clerk to the Imperial Chancellor (丞相長史)
- In office ? – 228
- Monarch: Liu Shan
- Chancellor: Zhuge Liang

Colonel of Infantry (步兵校尉)
- In office 228 – 233
- Monarch: Liu Shan
- Chancellor: Zhuge Liang

Administrator of Fangling (房陵太守) (under Liu Bei)
- In office ?–?
- Monarchs: Emperor Xian of Han / Liu Bei (from 219)

Administrator of Zangke (牂牁太守) (under Liu Bei)
- In office ?–?
- Monarch: Emperor Xian of Han

Administrator of Baxi (巴西太守) (under Liu Bei)
- In office 214 – ?
- Monarch: Emperor Xian of Han

Chief of Linju (臨沮長) (under Liu Biao)
- In office ? – 208
- Monarch: Emperor Xian of Han

Personal details
- Born: 160s (Note: Xiang Lang's biography in the Sanguozhi mentioned that he lived to his 80s. Thus, his birth year should be in the 160s.) Yicheng, Hubei
- Died: 247 (Note: Xiang Lang's biography in Sanguozhi mentioned that he died in the 10th year of the Yanxi era (238-257) in Liu Shan's reign.)
- Relations: Xiang Chŏng (nephew); Xiang Chōng (nephew)
- Children: Xiang Tiao
- Occupation: Official, scholar
- Courtesy name: Juda (巨達)
- Peerage: Marquis of Xianming Village (顯明亭侯)

Xiang Lang (160s-247), courtesy name Juda, was an official and scholar of the state of Shu Han during the Three Kingdoms period of China. He previously served under the warlords Liu Biao and Liu Bei (later the founding emperor of Shu Han) in the late Eastern Han dynasty. In his later years, Xiang Lang spent his time reading, writing, proofreading and editing various classical texts. By the time of his death in 247, he was one of the foremost book collectors of his time and a major source of influence for many later scholars. He was an uncle of the Shu general Xiang Chong.

== Early career ==
Xiang Lang was born in Yicheng, Xiangyang Commandery, which is present-day Yicheng, Hubei. In his youth, Xiang Lang was a student of Sima Hui, and was close and friendly with Xu Shu, Han Song and Pang Tong. He was appointed as the Chief of Linju (臨沮長) by Liu Biao. Upon Liu Biao's death, Xiang Lang went to serve under Liu Bei.

== Service under Liu Bei ==
After Liu Bei conquered the lands south of the Yangtze River, he assigned Xiang Lang as Commander (督) of Mu (巫), Yidao (夷道), Yiling (夷陵) and Zigui (秭歸) in charge of military and civil affairs of the four counties. After Liu Bei seized control of Yi Province (covering present-day Sichuan and Chongqing) from Liu Zhang in 214, he appointed Xiang Lang as the Administrator of Baxi Commandery (巴西太守). Soon, Xiang Lang was reassigned to serve as the Administrator of Zangke Commandery (牂牁太守) then as the Administrator of Fangling Commandery (房陵太守).

== Service under Liu Shan ==
In 223, after Liu Shan succeeded his father Liu Bei as the emperor of Shu, he appointed Xiang Lang as a Colonel of Infantry (步兵校尉) and Chief Clerk to the Imperial Chancellor (丞相長史), Zhuge Liang. In 225, when Zhuge Liang led the Shu forces on a campaign to pacify rebellions in the Nanzhong region, he left Xiang Lang in charge of domestic affairs at Shu's imperial capital, Chengdu.

In 228, when Zhuge Liang led Shu forces on the first of a series of campaigns against Shu's rival state, Cao Wei, he brought Xiang Lang along and left him in charge of the Shu base at Hanzhong Commandery. The Shu vanguard, led by Ma Su, suffered a devastating defeat at the Battle of Jieting against Wei forces led by Zhang He. Xiang Lang received news that Ma Su fled his post, but due to his friendship with Ma Su, he did not report it to Zhuge Liang. Later, after Zhuge Liang found out, he was so furious that he dismissed Xiang Lang and sent him back to Chengdu.

Some years later, Xiang Lang returned to serve in the Shu government as Minister of the Household (光祿勳). In 234, after Zhuge Liang's death, Liu Shan promoted Xiang Lang to the position of General of the Left (左將軍) and enfeoffed him as the Marquis of Xianming Village (顯明亭侯) in recognition of his past contributions.

In his youth, although he did study literature Xiang Lang wasn't interested in it. Instead, he wanted to serve as an official and for his ability received many praises. From the moment he was dismissed from his office as Chief Clerk, he traveled for almost thirty years without engaging in personal affairs. (Note: Pei Songzhi commented here that Xiang Lang was dismissed from his post as Chief Clerk for his association with Ma Su in 228, and died in 247. Hence it should be twenty rather than thirty years; the figure of "thirty" must be an error.) He concentrated his mind on the collection of records working assiduously and tirelessly. When he was more than eighty years old, he would still check personally each document, correct and inspect for any errors. He collected many books, volumes and scrolls and at the time had the largest library. He welcomed any guest. He would teach and receive many of the newer generation, but only to debate over ancient principles and refused to engage in discussion about current matters. For his attitude, he received praises. He was greatly respected from those in government office to the young students (before 19 years old) still learning. He died in 247.

== Xiang Tiao ==
Xiang Lang's son, Xiang Tiao (向條) inherited his father's title and became the next Marquis of Xianming Village (顯明亭侯). During the Jingyao era (景耀; 258–263) of Liu Shan's reign, he was appointed as Assistant to the Imperial Counsellor (御史中丞).

According to the Xiangyang Ji, Xiang Lang's last words to his son were: "The Zuo Zhuan teaches us that an army overcoming another is thanks to their harmony, not their numbers. It also says that when Heaven and Earth are joined in harmony then everything is created; when the ruler and his ministers are in harmony then the land is safe; when all the members in the family til the most distant relative are in harmony, then great enterprise can be made. During periods of calm, safety can be obtained and therefore all sages from all time favor it to reach harmony. I'm a mere servant of my state, nothing more. But from a young age, I missed my parents. Therefore, I was raised and educated by my two elder brothers. Thanks to their guidance, my character and conduct was such that I wasn't looking to satisfy personal gains or obtain wealth. In doing so, I was safe from ignorance. However, now I don't have much. But poverty is nothing to worry about, for men must sought after harmony; only this is precious. You must follow this conduct!"

It also recorded that Xiang Tiao, whose courtesy name was Wenbao (文豹), was known for his wide range of studies and extensive knowledge. He served during the Jin dynasty as Administrator of Jiangyang Commandery (江陽太守) and Major of the South Palace (南中軍司馬).

== See also ==
- Lists of people of the Three Kingdoms
