= Meng Guang =

3rd century Shu Han official and scholar

- 孟光

Minister of Finance (大司農)
- In office ?–?
- Monarch: Liu Shan

Steward of the Changle Palace (長樂少府)
- In office ?–?
- Monarch: Liu Shan

Colonel of the Garrison Cavalry (屯騎校尉)
- In office ?–?
- Monarch: Liu Shan

Prefect of Insignia and Credentials (符節令)
- In office 223 – ?
- Monarch: Liu Shan

Consultant (議郎)
- In office 214 – ?

Personal details
- Born: Unknown; Luoyang, Henan
- Died: Unknown
- Relations: Meng Yu (relative); Meng Ben (relative)
- Occupation: Official, scholar
- Courtesy name: Xiaoyu (孝裕)

Meng Guang (fl. 190s – third century), courtesy name Xiaoyu, was an official and scholar of the state of Shu Han in the Three Kingdoms period of China.

== Life ==
Meng Guang was from Luoyang, Henan. He was born sometime in the Eastern Han dynasty. His relative, Meng Yu (孟郁), served as the Grand Commandant (太尉) in the Han imperial court. Meng Yu's elder brother, Meng Ben (孟賁), was a eunuch who served as a Central Regular Attendant (中常侍). Meng Guang started his career as a minor official in one of the departments of the central government towards the end of the reign of Emperor Ling (r. 168–189).

In 190, after the warlord Dong Zhuo seized control of the Han central government and forced Emperor Xian (r. 189–220) to move the imperial capital to Chang'an, Meng Guang escaped and fled to Yi Province (covering present-day Sichuan and Chongqing). Liu Yan, the Governor of Yi Province, treated Meng Guang like a guest. After Liu Yan died in 194, his son and successor, Liu Zhang, accorded Meng Guang the same treatment. Meng Guang was known for being knowledgeable and well-read; he was particularly interested in the Records of the Grand Historian, Book of the Later Han and Dongguan Han Ji (東觀漢記). He also frequently debated with Lai Min, another guest scholar living in Yi Province, over the Spring and Autumn Annals (Chunqiu) as each of them preferred a different commentary on the Chunqiu: Meng Guang and Lai Min specialised in the Gongyang Zhuan and Zuo Zhuan respectively. Meng Guang was notorious for being loud and annoying during his debates with Lai Min.

In 214, after the warlord Liu Bei seized control of Yi Province from Liu Zhang, he appointed Meng Guang as a Consultant (議郎) and put him and Xu Ci in charge of institutional matters. Following the end of the Eastern Han dynasty in 220, Meng Guang served in the state of Shu Han, founded by Liu Bei in 221, during the Three Kingdoms period. Liu Shan, Liu Bei's son, became the new emperor of Shu when his father died in 223. During his reign, Liu Shan appointed Meng Guang to various positions, including Prefect of Insignia and Credentials (符節令), Colonel of the Garrison Cavalry (屯騎校尉), Steward of the Changle Palace (長樂少府), and Minister of Finance (大司農).

In the autumn of 246, when the Shu government proclaimed a general amnesty, Meng Guang stepped up and scolded Fei Yi, the head of the central government, in front of the entire imperial court. He argued that a general amnesty, as a policy, should only be implemented under extraordinary circumstances (e.g., as a political move to gain popular support especially in times of instability) and as a last resort. In his opinion, as Shu was rather peaceful and stable at the time, a general amnesty would benefit criminals instead of improving the government's public image. Fei Yi apologised to Meng Guang in a polite but awkward manner.

Throughout his career in the Shu government, Meng Guang was notorious for making public outbursts on numerous occasions and for being very unbridled in his speech. As a result, his colleagues generally disliked or detested him. There were also instances where he carelessly divulged state secrets (probably due to a slip of the tongue) and discussed politics in inappropriate settings. However, he got off lightly because he held much prestige among the literati for his status as a learned Confucian scholar. Meng Guang's behaviour had a huge negative impact on his career: he never made it to higher positions – his highest appointment was Minister of Finance (大司農) – and never received any honours/privileges (e.g., a marquis title). Two of his colleagues, Minister of Ceremonies Xin Cheng (鐔承) (Note: Xin Cheng (鐔承) was from Guanghan Commandery (廣漢郡; around present-day Guanghan, Sichuan) and his courtesy name was Gongwen (公文). Before rising to the position of Minister of Ceremonies (太常), he served as Minister Steward (少府) and as the administrator of various commanderies.) and Minister of the Household Pei Jun (裴儁), (Note: Pei Jun (裴儁) was from Hedong Commandery (河東郡) and his courtesy name was Fengxian (奉先). His elder brother, Pei Qian, served as Prefect of the Masters of Writing (尚書令) in Wei, Shu's rival state. When Pei Jun was still a teenager, he went to Yi Province (covering present-day Sichuan and Chongqing) to live with his brother-in-law, who served as a Chief Clerk (長史) there. He could not return to Hedong Commandery because of the chaos which broke out towards the end of the Eastern Han dynasty. He remained in Yi Province and eventually became a government official in Shu. His son, Pei Yue (裴越), had the courtesy name Lingxu (令緒). Like his father, Pei Yue also served in Shu as a military officer. After the fall of Shu in 263, Pei Yue moved to the Wei imperial capital Luoyang and served as a Consultant (議郎) in the Wei government.) were younger and less experienced than him, yet they made it to positions higher than his.

Xi Zheng, then an assistant official in the palace library, often visited Meng Guang to consult him. When Meng Guang asked him what the crown prince, Liu Xuan, had been learning and reading and what he was interested in, Xi Zheng replied, "He treats the people around him respectfully. He is very diligent and hardworking. He has the style of a crown prince of ancient times. When he meets people, he shows sincerity, kindness and generosity in everything he says and does." Meng Guang then said, "This is what is expected of every other person. What I really want to know is his level of political wisdom and how good his political skills are." Xi Zheng replied, "The Crown Prince's approach towards life is to focus on winning people's hearts and favour. He won't do what he shouldn't do. He doesn't openly reveal his wisdom. Besides, political skills can only be used under certain circumstances; they cannot be cultivated and learnt in advance." Meng Guang knew that Xi Zheng was trying to careful with his words, so he said, "I like to speak my mind as freely as possible. Every time I openly make criticisms, people will ridicule or hate me for that. Although I sense that you don't like to hear what I say, my words make sense. The Empire is not unified yet. Political skills are crucial in this time and age. While one's mastery of political skills depends on his intellectual abilities, political skills can be learnt and mastered through diligence. This has to do with the Crown Prince's education. He should be striving to enrich himself with as much knowledge as possible so that he can be like a consultant. He should also sit for written and oral tests like academics and gain some titles. This is a top priority for him." Xi Zheng strongly agreed with him.

Meng Guang was later removed from office for committing offences. He died in an unknown year in his 90s.

== See also ==
- Lists of people of the Three Kingdoms
