= Longzhong Plan =

Political strategic plan by Zhuge Liang (207)

- Traditional Chinese: 隆中對
- Simplified Chinese: 隆中对
Transcriptions
Standard Mandarin
- Hanyu Pinyin: Lóngzhōng duì

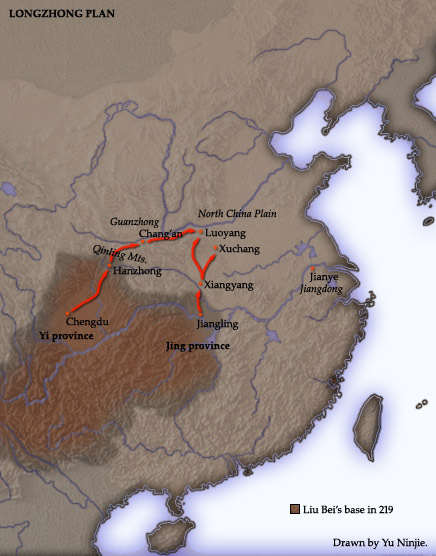
Outline of the Longzhong Plan.

The Longzhong Plan is the name given to a strategic plan by Zhuge Liang, a statesman of the Shu Han state in the Three Kingdoms period (220–280) of China. Zhuge Liang presented the plan to Liu Bei, a warlord who became the founding emperor of the Shu Han state, sometime in 207 towards the end of the Eastern Han dynasty when Liu Bei visited him at his residence in Longzhong, an area in the west of present-day Xiangyang, Hubei.

The Longzhong Plan formed the basis for the establishment of the Shu Han state. In essence, the plan required Liu Bei to gain control over Jing and Yi provinces, which covered present-day Hubei and Hunan, and Sichuan and Chongqing, respectively, so as to secure a viable base for staging attacks against Liu Bei's rival, Cao Cao, and his territories in central and northern China. The plan also required Liu Bei to form a strategic alliance with another warlord, Sun Quan, who was based in eastern China.

== Details ==
Zhuge Liang's biography in the historical text Records of the Three Kingdoms, written by Chen Shou in the late third century, recorded the details of the private conversation between him and Liu Bei in his house in Longzhong. Liu Bei said:

"The Han dynasty is in decline. Villainous officials usurp power while the Emperor was forced into exile. I may be unworthy in both strength and virtue, but I still want to uphold justice and righteousness in the Empire. However, I am not intelligent and shrewd enough, which is why I have repeatedly suffered setbacks and ended up in my current situation. Nevertheless, I have neither deviated from my initial intentions nor given up on my ambitions. Sir, what do you think I can do?"

Zhuge Liang replied:

"Since Dong Zhuo usurped power, many warlords throughout the Empire have risen up, seized and controlled territories.

Cao Cao was inferior to Yuan Shao in terms of fame and military power, yet he managed to defeat Yuan Shao and transform from a weak to a powerful warlord. This was not due to only favourable circumstances, but also human intelligence and wisdom. Now, as Cao Cao leads hundreds of thousands of troops and uses the Emperor's name to command other warlords, you definitely can't compete with him directly.

Sun Quan rules over Jiangdong and his family has controlled the region for three generations. He has geographical advantage, the hearts of the people, and the support of many wise and talented advisers. You should attempt to make contact and form an alliance with him instead of trying to conquer his territories.

As for Jing Province, it has natural geographical barriers such as the Han and Mian rivers in the north, as well as direct access to an abundance of resources from the sea in the south. It is connected to Wu and Kuaiji commanderies in the east, and Ba and Shu commanderies in the west. It is a strategic location in the eyes of military strategists. Its ruler doesn't have the capability to defend it. It is a special gift from Heaven to you, General. Do you, General, have the intention of seizing it?

Yi Province is a geographically strategic location. It has thousands of li of fertile land and has been called a "Country of Heaven". Emperor Gaozu used it as his base when he started conquering the Empire. Liu Zhang is incompetent and weak. He also faces the threat of Zhang Lu in the north. Even though his domain is wealthy and prosperous, he doesn't know how to treasure it. All the talents there hope to serve under a wise ruler.

General, you are not only a member of the imperial clan, but also a man famous throughout the Empire for his integrity and righteousness. You have attracted heroes to aid you, and you seek wise and capable talents like a thirsty man looking for water. If you control Jing and Yi provinces and make use of their strategic geography to defend them well. At the same time, you should foster good relations with the Rong peoples in the west and implement policies to placate and pacify the Yi and Yue peoples in the south. Externally, you should build a strong alliance with Sun Quan; internally, you should reform government and promote civil culture.

When the opportunity arises, you can order one of your senior officers to lead troops from Jing Province to attack Wancheng and Luoyang, while you, General, can personally lead troops out of Yi Province via the Qin Mountains. When you do this, won't the people welcome you and your troops with food and drink? If this really happens, you will be able to fulfil your ambition and the Han dynasty will be revived."

The plan envisaged that Liu Bei would take over Jing and Yi provinces, both of which were governed by the warlords Liu Biao and Liu Zhang respectively. The Longzhong Plan noted that Cao Cao controlled the North China Plain, which was key to mastery of China, and that Sun Quan held the lower Yangtze River region, known as "Jiangdong". In view of this, a move to occupy Jing and Yi provinces was vital for success. The essential outlines of the plan held remarkable foresight in envisaging the tripartite division of China. The other crucial aspect of the plan was the proposal for forming an alliance with Sun Quan in order to deter and resist Cao Cao. Other minor aspects included the institution of economic, legal and administrative reforms as well as developing cordial relations with the non-Han Chinese peoples located in the west and south. Such a policy would reduce resistance and increase much-needed manpower and economic resources. The culminating clause was a two-pronged northern campaign which would end in the seizure of the North China Plain and the reestablishment of the Han dynasty.

One advance would be from Yi Province in the west, north through the Qin Mountains, which debouches into the Wei River valley and achieving a strategic position in the west from which to dominate the great bend of the Yellow River and the Guanzhong region. The second advance would be from Jing Province north toward Luoyang, the old imperial capital of the Han dynasty, and the surrounding plains. Such a campaign would presumably occur at an opportune moment of destabilisation of Cao Cao's regime but that moment was not specified. Nor was the role of Sun Quan in the offensives identified; though it would be assumed that he would tie down at least some of Cao Cao's forces.

From 214 onwards, Liu Bei controlled both Jing and Yi provinces after seizing Yi Province from Liu Zhang. In 219, he won a decisive victory over Cao Cao and occupied Hanzhong Commandery. That autumn, his commander in Jing Province, Guan Yu, struck north against Cao Cao's positions on the Han River. This offensive may have been part of the planned two-pronged attack. For the first few months, Guan Yu's attack was remarkably successful and Cao Cao even considered evacuating the imperial capital, Xuchang. At this point, however, Sun Quan took the opportunity to launch a surprise attack and rapidly seized Jing Province. Liu Bei tried unsuccessfully to recapture Jing Province during the Battle of Xiaoting of 222–223, and died shortly thereafter. Even with the loss of Jing Province, Zhuge Liang may have attempted to carry out a modified version of the Longzhong Plan in the form of the Northern Expeditions, although it is arguable that those campaigns had different tactical and strategic goals.

== Criticism ==
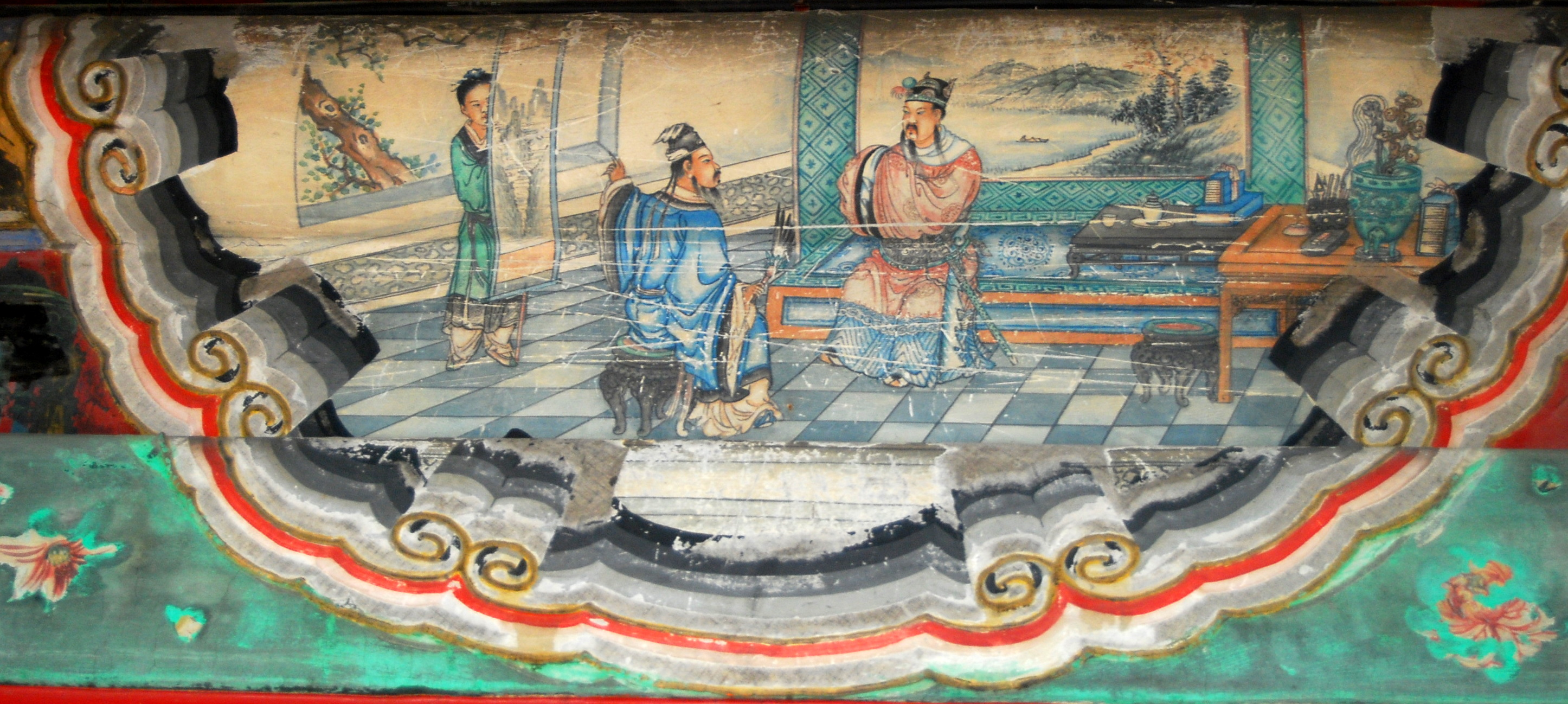
Liu Bei and Zhuge Liang discussing the Longzhong Plan. Mural at the Long Corridor of the Summer Palace, Beijing.

The Qing dynasty scholar Wang Fuzhi was critical of the strategic goal of the Longzhong Plan because the two-pronged offensive that was intrinsic to the plan did not make a distinction as to which prong was the decoy and which was the main force. He alludes to the plan as being without any subtlety: such as using the stratagem "make a sound in the east but strike in the west" (聲東擊西 shēng dōng jī xī). Nor did it incorporate any hint of the interplay between zheng (正) and qi (奇) - the orthodox, apparent, and overt military operation and a surprise, covert, or unexpected military action which brings about victory for a weaker force. Wang Fuzhi notes that one who seeks to seize the empire from a comparatively weak position must be flexible in strategic planning in order to grasp the opportunity to use qi to obtain victory.

Others charge that the political goal of the Longzhong Plan was flawed because the restoration of the Han dynasty was unrealistic. The Cao Wei state, which Zhuge Liang considered to be an illegitimate successor to the Han dynasty, had effectively dealt with economic and political issues and had gained the support of the people. The military historians at the Military Science Academy in Beijing view Zhuge Liang's political goal as inappropriate and unrealistic even in 207 when the plan was formulated and totally irrelevant by the time of the Northern Expeditions. The idea of seizing Jing Province in the Longzhong Plan was a flawed concept because Sun Quan would never accept Liu Bei in control of this critical area, crucial for the security of his base in Jiangdong. In essence, Zhuge Liang is charged with failing to make an objective analysis of the political situation in 207.

== See also ==
- The Three Visits

== Reading ==
- Chen, Shou (3rd century). Records of the Three Kingdoms (Sanguozhi).
- Pei, Songzhi (5th century). Annotations to Records of the Three Kingdoms (Sanguozhi zhu).
- Sima, Guang (1084). Zizhi Tongjian.
