= The Three Visits =

Eastern Han Dynasty event

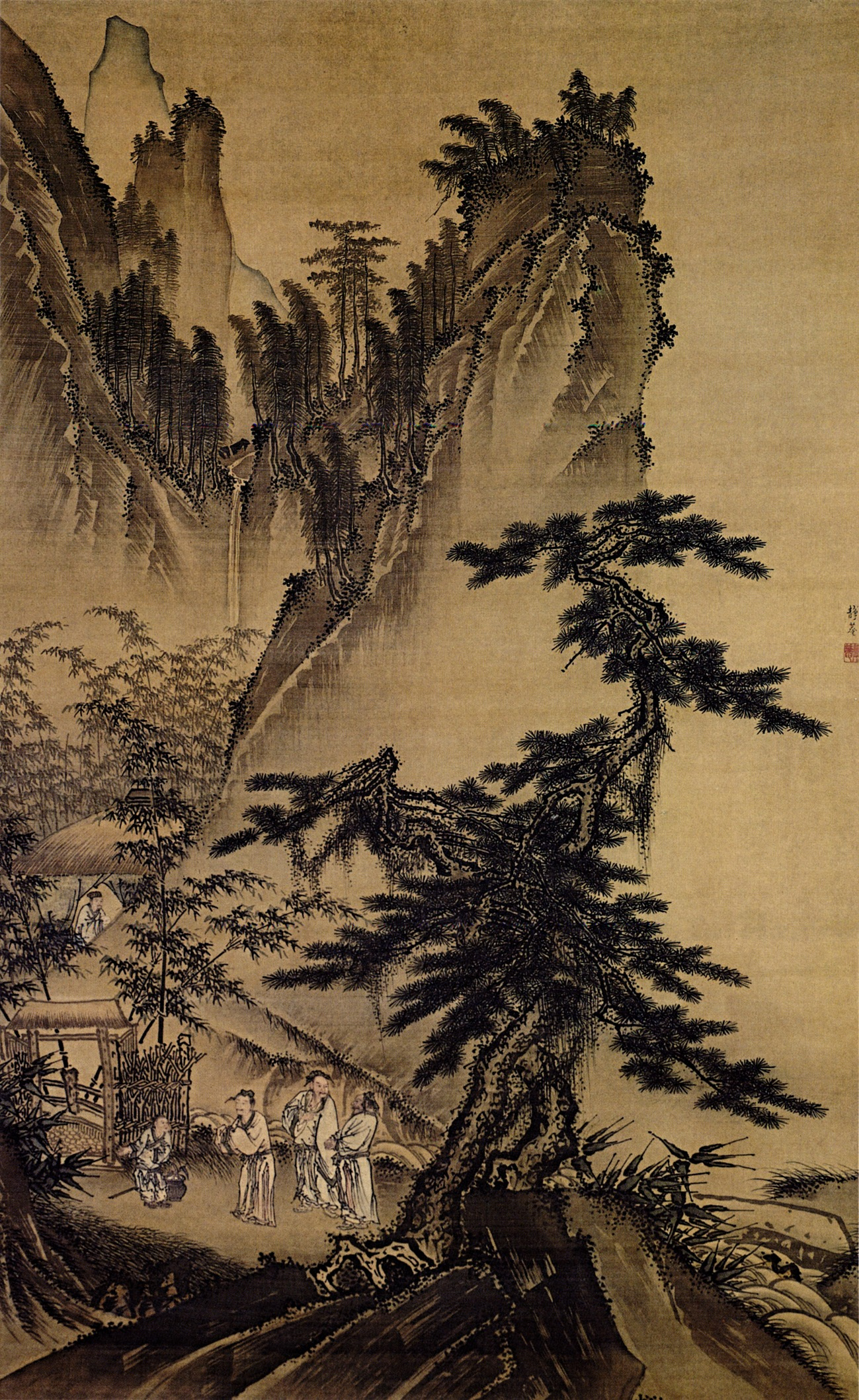
Looking Three Times at the Thatched Hut; hanging scroll, ink on silk, by Dai Jin (1388–1462)

The Three Visits to the Thatched Cottage (Note: Also known in English as The Three Visits to the Thatched Hut, The Three Visits to the Grass Hut, and Three visits to a rural retreat.) (Chinese: 三顧茅廬) refers to the event in the late Eastern Han dynasty (c.late 2nd century AD) when the future Shu Han emperor Liu Bei visited Zhuge Liang’s residence three times to ask him for help. The Zizhi Tongjian recorded that the meeting(s) took place in 207. The event is briefly mentioned in the historical Records of the Three Kingdoms and fictionalized in more detail in the novel Romance of the Three Kingdoms.

== Historical accounts ==
The Records of the Three Kingdoms describes in just one sentence that Liu Bei visited Zhuge Liang three (Note: Although the Sanguozhi recorded that Liu Bei visited Zhuge Liang three times, the "three times" could also be interpreted in a metaphorical way to mean "multiple times", à la the Chinese saying 一而再，再而三 used to describe something be done repeatedly.) times and met him. (Note: Chen and Pei 429, 35.912: "由是先主遂詣亮，凡三往，乃見。") The Zizhi Tongjian recorded that the meeting(s) took place in 207. Chen Shou also mentions the three visits in his biographical sketch of Zhuge Liang appended to the compilation of Zhuge Liang's writings. (Note: Chen and Pei 429, 35.930) Among those is the Former Chu Shi Biao, where Zhuge Liang says: "(Liu Bei) visited me thrice in the grass cottage (草盧), [and] consulted me on the affairs of our time."

During the third visit, Zhuge Liang presented the Longzhong Plan to Liu Bei. Liu Bei accepted the plan, which solidified Zhuge Liang as the military strategist for Liu Bei.

=== Weilüe and Jiuzhou Chunqiu accounts ===
The Weilüe and Jiuzhou Chunqiu (九州春秋), however, provide a completely different account of how Liu Bei met Zhuge Liang. It mentioned that Liu Bei was at Fancheng (樊城; present-day Fancheng District, Xiangyang, Hubei) at the time, and that Cao Cao had just pacified northern China and was preparing to attack Jing Province. Zhuge Liang went to Fancheng to meet Liu Bei, who treated him like any other ordinary guest because he did not know Zhuge Liang before that, and thought that he was just a typical young scholar. When all the other guests left after the meeting, Zhuge Liang stayed behind. Liu Bei did not ask him if he had something to say, and started playing with a yak tail garment one of the guests had gifted him. Zhuge Liang said, "I heard that you, General, have great ambitions, yet all I see is you playing with that." When Liu Bei heard that, he sensed that Zhuge Liang was no ordinary person so he threw aside the gift and said he was only playing with it as a hobby. Zhuge Liang then asked him if he and Liu Biao could resist an invasion by Cao Cao. When Liu Bei replied that neither him nor Liu Biao was capable of resisting Cao Cao and that he was at a loss on what to do, Zhuge Liang proposed a plan for him. He pointed out that there were large numbers of refugees who migrated south to Jing Province to escape from the chaos in central and northern China, and suggested to Liu Bei to have them registered as new residents so that the Jing Province administration could collect taxes from them and draft them into military service. Liu Bei heeded Zhuge Liang's advice and managed to increase the strength of his forces. From then on, he saw Zhuge Liang as a great talent and started treating him like an honoured guest. (Note: Yu, Weilüe: "劉備屯於樊城。是時曹公方定河北，亮知荊州次當受敵，而劉表性緩，不曉軍事。亮乃北行見備，備與亮非舊，又以其年少，以諸生意待之。坐集旣畢，衆賔皆去，而亮獨留，備亦不問其所欲言。備性好結毦，時適有人以髦牛尾與備者，備因手自結之。亮乃進曰：「明將軍當復有遠志，但結毦而已邪！」備知亮非常人也，乃投毦而荅曰：「是何言與！我聊以忘憂爾。」亮遂言曰：「將軍度劉鎮南孰與曹公邪？」備曰：「不及。」亮又曰：「將軍自度何如也？」備曰：「亦不如。」曰：「今皆不及，而將軍之衆不過數千人，以此待敵，得無非計乎！」備曰：「我亦愁之，當若之何？」亮曰：「今荊州非少人也，而著籍者寡，平居發調，則人心不恱；可語鎮南，令國中凡有游戶，皆使自實，因錄以益衆可也。」備從其計，故衆遂彊。備由此知亮有英略，乃以上客禮之。" Cited in Chen and Pei 429, 35.913 n. 2, with the addendum that Sima Biao's Jiuzhou Chunqiu records events similarly.)

In summary, the Weilüe and Jiuzhou Chunqiu accounts say Zhuge Liang visited Liu Bei first instead of the popular story of Liu Bei visiting Zhuge Liang three times. Pei Songzhi, the compiler of the Annotated Records of the Three Kingdoms, dismissed these alternate accounts since they contradict Zhuge Liang's own words in the Chu Shi Biao. (Note: Pei Songzhi, in Chen and Pei 429, 35.914 n. 2: "臣松之以為亮表云「先帝不以臣卑鄙，猥自枉屈，三顧臣於草廬之中，諮臣以當世之事」，則非亮先詣備，明矣。")

Yi Zhongtian suggested that both the records in Sanguozhi and Weilüe could be true. The chronological order might be: Zhuge Liang approached Liu Bei first to demonstrate his wisdom. Liu Bei, having recognised Zhuge Liang's talent, personally visited him three times to have further discussions.

== In Romance of the Three Kingdoms ==
The 14th-century historical novel Romance of the Three Kingdoms gives a romanticised account, spanning two chapters, of how Liu Bei met Zhuge Liang. After Xu Shu recommends Zhuge Liang to him, Liu Bei travels to Longzhong with his sworn brothers Guan Yu and Zhang Fei to find Zhuge Liang. When they reach Zhuge Liang's house (described as a "thatched cottage" 茅廬), a servant tells them that his master is out. Liu Bei then asks the servant to pass a message to Zhuge Liang that Liu Bei came to find him. Later during winter, Liu Bei and his sworn brothers brave heavy snowfall and travel to Longzhong again. Along the way, they meet Zhuge Liang's friends. This time, the servant leads them to his "master", who turns out to be Zhuge Liang's younger brother, Zhuge Jin. Just as they are about to leave, Liu Bei sees an older man approaching and thinks he is Zhuge Liang, but the man introduces himself as Huang Chengyan, Zhuge Liang's father-in-law. When spring arrives, Liu Bei decides to visit Zhuge Liang again, much to the annoyance of his sworn brothers. On this third occasion, Zhuge Liang is at home but is asleep. Liu Bei waits patiently for hours until Zhuge Liang wakes up.

== Cultural influences ==
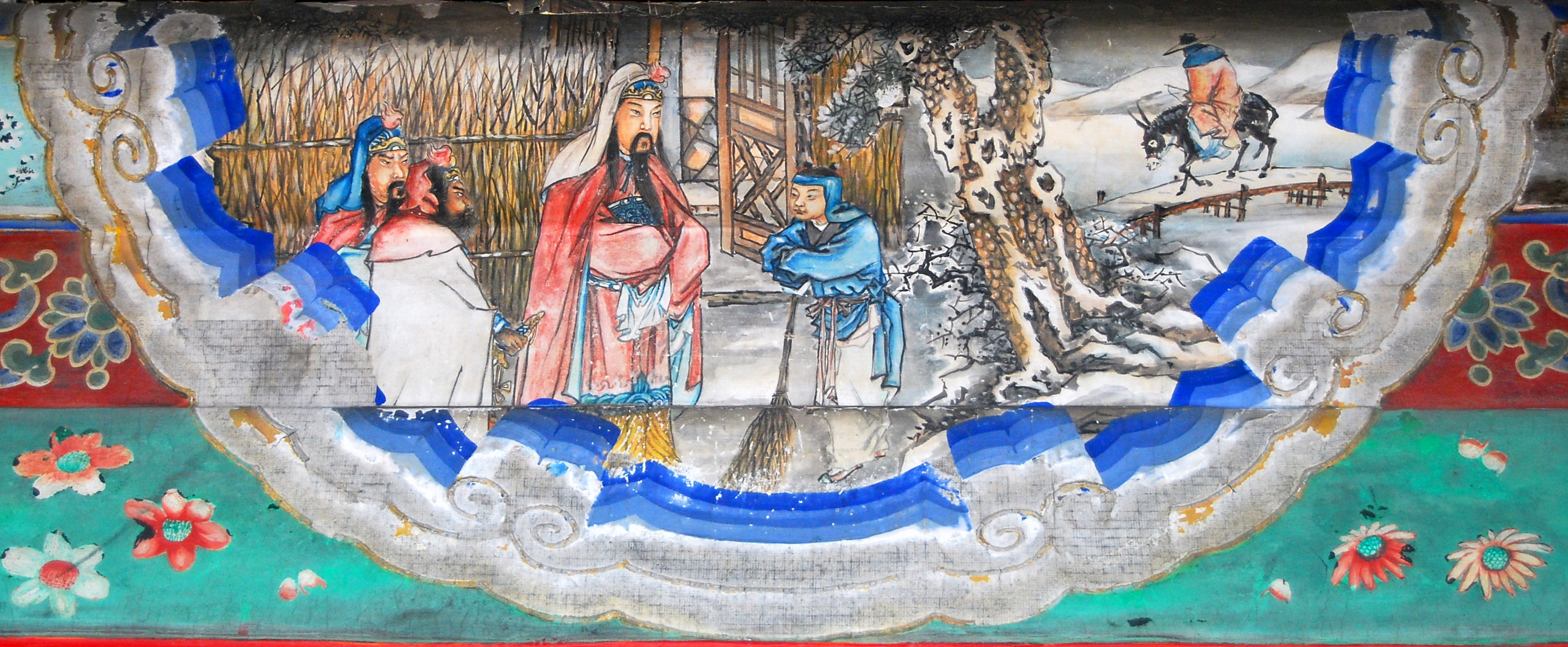
A 19th century painting in the Long Corridor of the Summer Palace displaying the Three Visits to the Thatched Cottage

The event has been adapted into other works, such as plays and portrayed in works of visual art by artists such as Dai Jin.

"To visit a thatched cottage three times" became a complementary idiom in Chinese language, a metaphor with the meaning or "sincerely and repeatedly making a request to a worthy person".
