= Jian'an, Xuchang =

Jian'an 建安区
- District
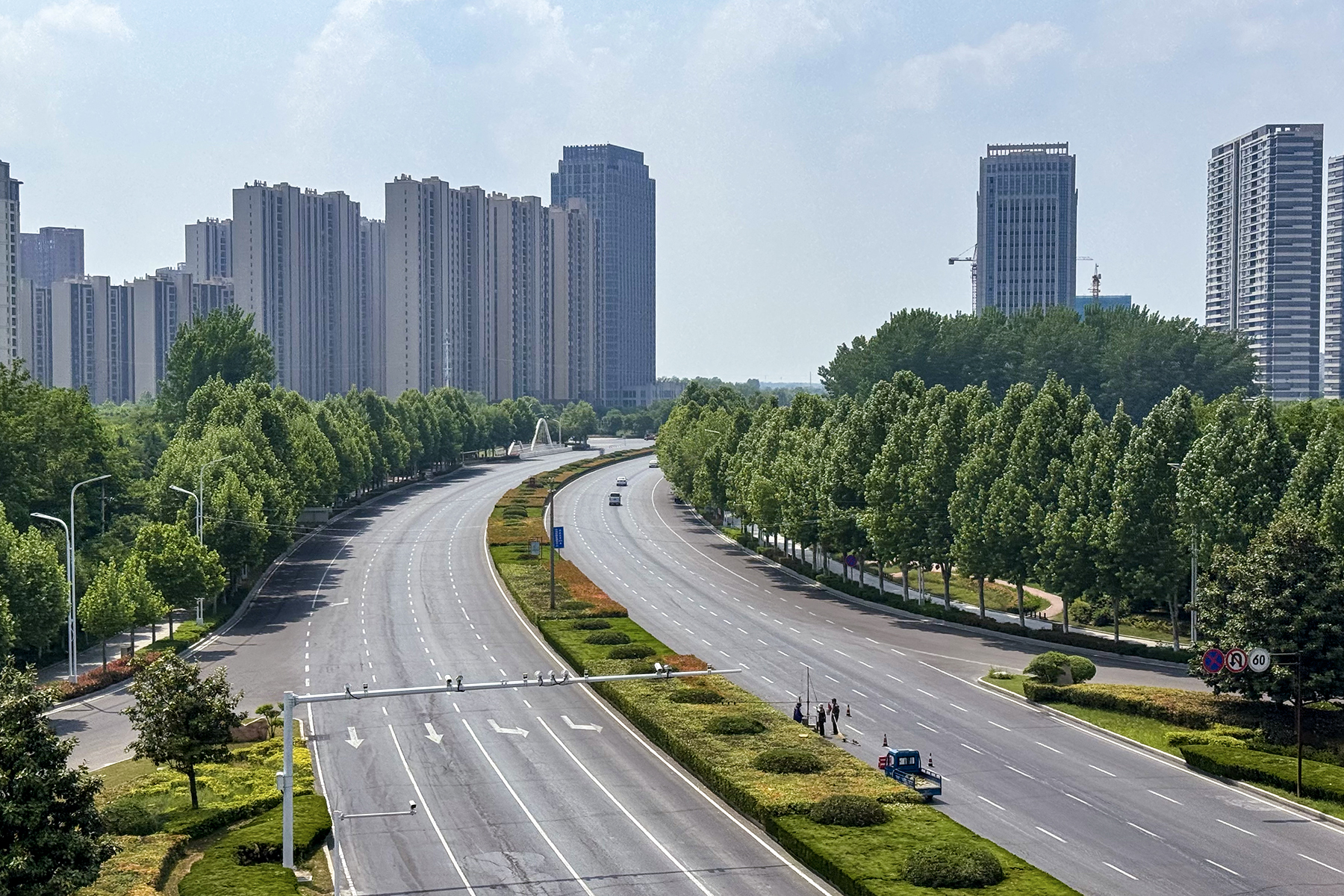

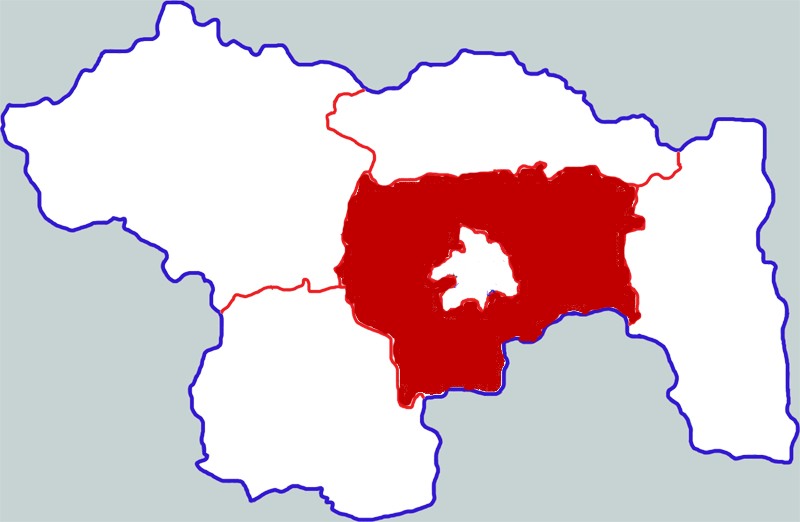
- Jian'an in Xuchang

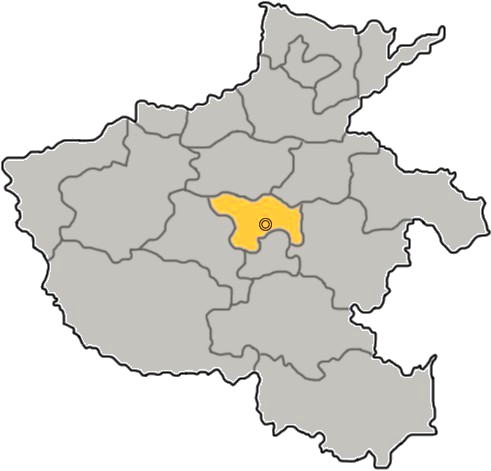
- Xuchang in Henan
- Coordinates: 34°07′29″N 113°49′23″E
- Country: People's Republic of China
- Province: Henan
- Prefecture-level city: Xuchang

Area
  - Total: 1,002 km^{2} (387 sq mi)

Population (2019)
  - Total: 793,100
  - Density: 791.5/km^{2} (2,050/sq mi)
- Time zone: UTC+8 (China Standard)
- Postal code: 461100

Jian'an District (Chinese: 建安区; pinyin: Jiàn'ān Qū), formerly Xuchang County (许昌县) is a district of the prefecture of Xuchang in Henan Province, China. The district is named for Jian'an, a famous Chinese era during the reign of Emperor Xian, the last emperor of the Han dynasty.

== Administrative divisions ==
As of 2012, this district is divided to 7 towns, 8 townships and 1 ethnic township.

Towns

- Jiangguanchi (将官池镇)
- Wunüdian (五女店镇)
- Shangji (尚集镇)
- Suqiao (苏桥镇)
- Jiangliji (蒋李集镇)
- Zhangpan (张潘镇)
- Lingjing (灵井镇)

Townships

- Chencao Township (陈曹乡)
- Dengzhuang Township (邓庄乡)
- Xiaozhao Township (小召乡)
- Hejie Township (河街乡)
- Guicun Township (桂村乡)
- Zhenjian Township (椹涧乡)
- Yulin Township (榆林乡)
- Changcunzhang Township (长村张乡)

Ethnic townships

- Aizhuang Hui Township (艾庄回族乡)
