= Lai Min =

3rd century Shu Han state official and scholar

- 來敏

General Who Behaves Cautiously (執慎將軍)
- In office ?–?
- Monarch: Liu Shan

Household Counsellor (光祿大夫)
- In office ?–?
- Monarch: Liu Shan

Empress's Chamberlain (大長秋)
- In office after 234 – ?
- Monarch: Liu Shan

General Who Assists the Army (輔軍將軍)
- In office 227 or later – before 234
- Monarch: Liu Shan
- Chancellor: Zhuge Liang

Army Libationer (軍祭酒)
- In office 227 or later – before 234
- Monarch: Liu Shan
- Chancellor: Zhuge Liang

Huben General of the Household (虎賁中郎將)
- In office 223 – ?
- Monarch: Liu Shan
- Chancellor: Zhuge Liang

Crown Prince's Household Steward (太子家令)
- In office 221 or later – 223
- Monarch: Liu Bei
- Chancellor: Zhuge Liang

Personal details
- Born: c. 160s (Note: Lai Min's biography in the Sanguozhi mentioned that he died in the middle of the Jingyao era (258–263) of Liu Shan's reign at the age of 97 (by East Asian age reckoning). Based on this record, he probably died in the 260s and was therefore born in the 160s.) Xinye County, Henan
- Died: c. 260s (aged 96)
- Relations: Lai Xi (ancestor); Huang Wan (brother-in-law)
- Children: Lai Zhong
- Parent: Lai Yan (father)
- Occupation: Official, scholar
- Courtesy name: Jingda (敬達)

Lai Min (c. 160s – 260s), courtesy name Jingda, was an official and scholar of the state of Shu Han during the Three Kingdoms period of China.

== Life ==
Lai Min was from Xinye County (新野縣), Yiyang Commandery (義陽郡), which is present-day Xinye County, Henan. He was born sometime in the 160s during the Eastern Han dynasty. His ancestor was Lai Xi (來歙; died 35 CE), an official who served under Emperor Guangwu (r. 25–57 CE), the first Eastern Han emperor. His father, Lai Yan (來豔), was known for being studious and hospitable towards retainers. Lai Yan served as a government official and rose to the position of Minister of Works (司空) during the reign of Emperor Ling (r. 168–189).

When chaos broke out towards the end of the Eastern Han dynasty, Lai Min and his elder sister fled south to Jing Province (covering present-day Hubei and Hunan) to evade trouble. Lai Min's elder sister married Huang Wan (黃琬), a nephew of Lady Huang, the paternal grandmother of Liu Zhang, the Governor of Yi Province (covering present-day Sichuan and Chongqing). When Liu Zhang heard that they were in Jing Province, he sent people to fetch them to Yi Province. Lai Min followed his sister to Yi Province, where Liu Zhang treated him like a guest.

Lai Min was known for being well read, well-versed in the Zuo Zhuan, and for specialising in lexicographical works such as the Cangjiepian and Erya. In particular, he enjoyed studying ancient Chinese script styles. He frequently debated with Meng Guang, another guest scholar living in Yi Province, over the Spring and Autumn Annals (Chunqiu) as each of them preferred a different commentary on the Chunqiu: Lai Min and Meng Guang specialised in the Zuo Zhuan and Gongyang Zhuan respectively. Meng Guang was notorious for being loud and annoying during his debates with Lai Min.

In 214, after the warlord Liu Bei seized control of Yi Province from Liu Zhang, he recruited Lai Min to serve in the education office of his administration. During this time, Lai Min worked with a group of scholars on the codification of procedures and rituals. However, the project ended up dissolving into squabbles.

Following the end of the Eastern Han dynasty in 220, Lai Min served in the state of Shu Han, founded by Liu Bei in 221, during the Three Kingdoms period. Liu Bei appointed him as Household Steward (家令) to take care of Liu Shan, the Crown Prince. When Liu Bei died in 223, Liu Shan succeeded his father as the emperor of Shu. After his coronation, Liu Shan appointed Lai Min as a General of the Household (中郎將) in the Huben (虎賁; "Rapid as Tigers") division of the imperial guards.

Between 227 and 234, Zhuge Liang, the Imperial Chancellor of Shu, launched a series of military campaigns against Shu's rival state, Wei. Hanzhong Commandery served as the base for launching each campaign. During this time, Zhuge Liang summoned Lai Min to Hanzhong Commandery and appointed him as an Army Libationer (軍祭酒) and General Who Assists the Army (輔軍將軍) to assist him in the campaigns. Lai Min was later stripped of his appointments for committing an offence. Zhuge Liang wrote in a memo why he decided to fire Lai Min:

General Lai Min once told his superior(s): 'What achievements have the newcomers made to give them the right to steal the glory away from me? If they all hate me, so be it.' In his old age, he turned insolent and rebellious, and started voicing out such perceived grievances. In the past, when the Late Emperor first settled in Chengdu, many officials accused Lai Min of stirring up dissent. However, as the Late Emperor was concerned about maintaining political stability in the newly established administration, he tolerated Lai Min but did not put him in any key appointments. Later, when Liu Zichu recommended Lai Min to be the Crown Prince's Household Steward, the Late Emperor was unhappy but he could not bear to reject Liu Zichu's recommendation so he agreed. After His Majesty came to the throne, I heard of Lai Min and decided to let him serve as a General and Libationer under me – despite having heard negative views of Lai Min from many colleagues. I chose not to be swayed by how the Late Emperor treated Lai Min, as I believed that I could positively influence Lai Min and change him for the better. Now that I have failed to do so, I have no choice but to strip him of his appointments and send him home to reflect on his behaviour.

Following Zhuge Liang's death in 234, Lai Min returned to Chengdu, the Shu imperial capital, to serve as the Empress's Chamberlain (大長秋). He was fired again later. After some time, he was recalled to serve as a Household Counsellor (光祿大夫), but was removed from office again shortly after. Throughout his career, he was demoted or fired several times, either because he had no filter when he spoke or because he behaved inappropriately.

At the time, Lai Min's old debating rival, Meng Guang, was as equally notorious for being unbridled in his speech and was, in some ways, worse than Lai Min in this regard. Meng Guang not only carelessly divulged state secrets (probably due to a slip of the tongue), but also discussed politics in an inappropriate setting. Nevertheless, both of them got off lightly because they held much prestige among the literati for their status as learned Confucian scholars. Lai Min, in particular, came from an elite family background and had previously served as an attendant to the Shu emperor Liu Shan when the emperor was still crown prince, therefore he was able to return to service every time after he got fired.

After Lai Min's string of incidents, the Shu government specially appointed him as General Who Behaves Cautiously (執慎將軍). The name of his position was meant to remind him to be mindful of his speech and conduct. He died sometime between 258 and 263 at the age of 97 (by East Asian age reckoning).

== Family ==
Lai Min's son, Lai Zhong (來忠), was known for being well-versed in Confucian studies and resembling his father in character. Lai Zhong and Xiang Chong once praised the Shu general Jiang Wei, who was so pleased that he recruited them to serve as Army Advisers (參軍) under him.

== See also ==
- Lists of people of the Three Kingdoms
