= Xiang Chong (Three Kingdoms) =

State of Shu Han military officer (died 240)

Xiang Chǒng
- 向寵
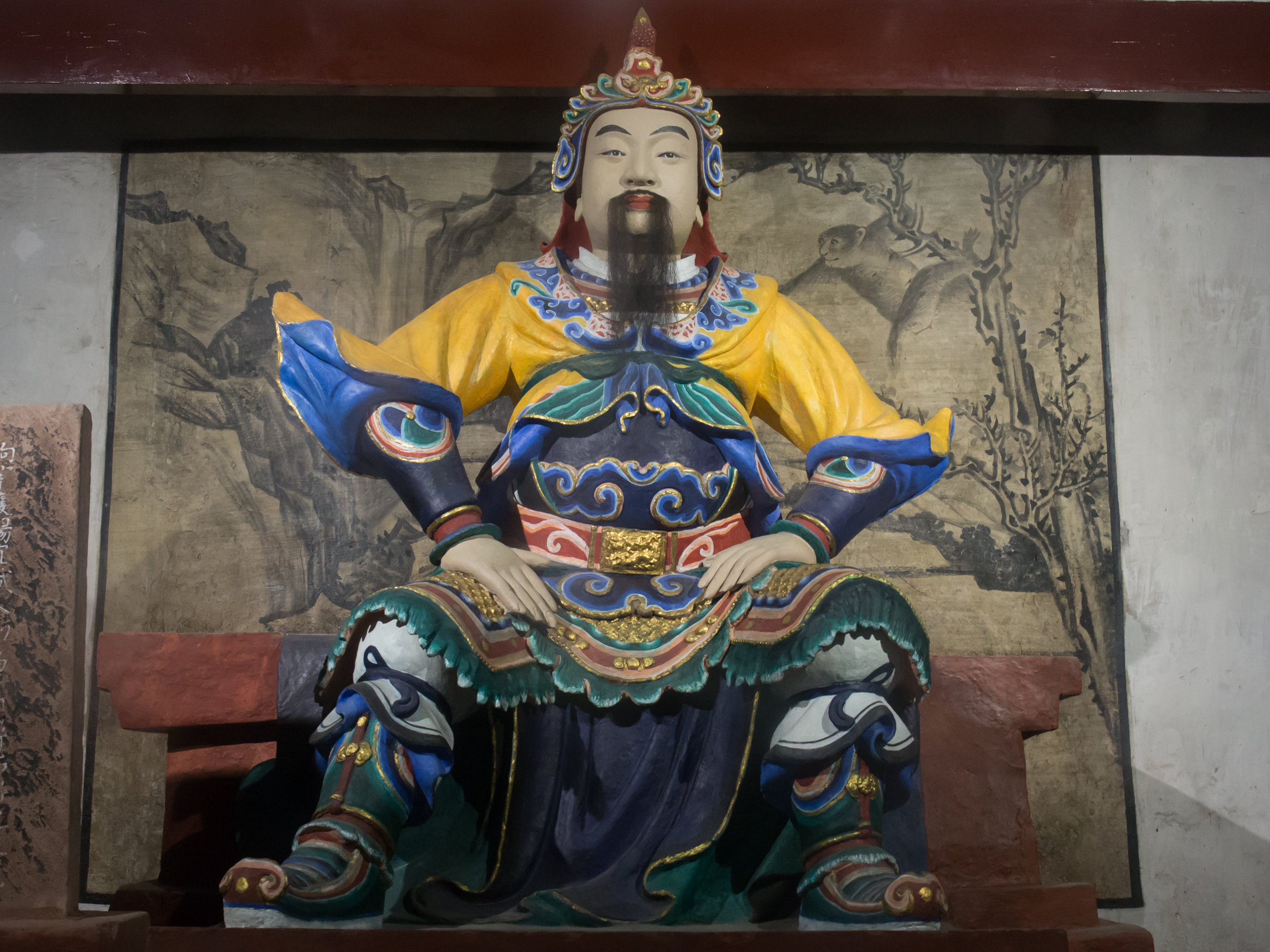
- Statue of Xiang Chong in the Zhuge Liang Memorial Temple in Chengdu, Sichuan

Commandant of the Central Army (中領軍)
- In office ? – 240
- Monarch: Liu Shan

Central Chief Controller (中都督)
- In office 223 – ?
- Monarch: Liu Shan
- Chancellor: Zhuge Liang

Officer of the Standard (牙門將)
- In office ? – 223
- Monarch: Liu Bei
- Chancellor: Zhuge Liang

Personal details
- Born: Unknown Yicheng, Hubei
- Died: 240 Lushan County, Sichuan
- Relations: Xiang Chōng (brother); Xiang Lang (uncle); Xiang Tiao (cousin)
- Occupation: Military officer
- Peerage: Marquis of a Chief Village (都亭侯)

Xiang Chǒng (died 240) was a Chinese military officer of the state of Shu Han during the Three Kingdoms period of China. In the Chu Shi Biao, Zhuge Liang named Xiang Chong as a capable subject of good character and someone well-versed in military affairs, and urged Liu Shan to put Xiang Chong's talents to good use. He was a nephew of the Shu scholar Xiang Lang.

== Life ==
Xiang Chong was born in Yicheng, Xiangyang Commandery, which is present-day Yicheng, Hubei. His uncle, Xiang Lang, served under Liu Biao, the Governor of Jing Province (covering present-day Hubei and Hunan) in the late Eastern Han dynasty and later under the warlord Liu Bei, the founding emperor of the Shu Han state in the Three Kingdoms period.

Xiang Chong started his military career in Shu as an Officer of the Standard (牙門將) during Liu Bei's short reign from 221 to 223. During the Battle of Xiaoting of 221–222, while the Shu forces were retreating after their defeat, only Xiang Chong's unit managed to retreat without sustaining any losses along the way. As a result, he received high praise from Liu Bei.

In 223, when Liu Shan became the new emperor of Shu after his father death, he enfeoffed Xiang Chong as a Marquis of a Chief Village (都亭侯) and appointed him as a Central Chief Controller (中都督) among the imperial guards. Around 227 or 228, when Zhuge Liang, the Imperial Chancellor of Shu, was about to launch the first of a series of military campaigns against Shu's rival state Wei, he wrote the Chu Shi Biao to Liu Shan to explain his reasons for waging war against Wei and giving advice to the emperor on governance.

In the Chu Shi Biao, Zhuge Liang described Xiang Chong as such: "General Xiang Chong is a man that is naturraly inclined toward virtuous acts and fair conduct, he also understands fluently military affairs, in the past he has been tested and answered well to the problem of the time and the Late Emperor praised him as talented therefore in accordance with the desire of the masses he was presented as Commander (督). In my humble view, the military affairs should be first discussed with him then surely the army would be able to move forward coordinate hence we could recolt victory's harvest."

Xiang Chong was later promoted to the position of Commandant of the Central Army (中領軍). In 240, he was killed in action while leading Shu forces to suppress a rebellion by local tribes in Hanjia Commandery (漢嘉郡; around present-day Lushan County, Sichuan).

== Xiang Chōng (向充) ==
Xiang Chong had a similarly named younger brother, Xiang Chong (向充), (Note: Note that the Chinese characters for Chong in their names are different.) who also served as a military officer in Shu. He initially held the appointments of Colonel of Trainee Archers (射聲校尉) and Master of Writing (尚書) in the imperial secretariat.

When Zhuge Liang died in 234, many people wanted the Shu government to build temples/shrines to commemorate him, but the government refused so many people privately built their own temples/shrines. When Xiang Chong, then holding the position of a Palace Gentleman of Writing (中書郎), heard about it, he and Xi Long (習隆; an infantry colonel) wrote to the Shu emperor Liu Shan to advise him to build a temple for Zhuge Liang in Mianyang.

Between 240 and 262, when the Shu general Jiang Wei led Shu forces on a series of military campaigns against Shu's rival state Wei, Xiang Chōng and another official, Lai Zhong, served as Jiang Wei's subordinates.

About eight months after the Conquest of Shu by Wei, in c.July 264, the Wei general Wei Guan found a jade ring and seal with the words "Cheng Xin" ("Achieving Faith") etched on them. The people of Wei showed them to the officials and discussed about this before keeping it in the Chancellor's office.

Xiang Chong heard about this and commented: "In the past, I heard Qiao Zhou saying that the Former Emperor's name was "Bei" which means "to prepare", while the Later Ruler's name was "Shan" which means "to give". This must mean that the Liu clan was already prepared to give up their power to another. Today, the Supporter of the Army is named "Yan" while Han's last year was "Yánxīng" meaning "Yan rises". Chengdu sent a propitious sign and is now stored in the Chancellor's office. (Note: At the time, the Chancellor (xiangguo) of Wei was Sima Zhao, Sima Yan's father.) Surely, this is Heaven's will."

During the same year (the Chinese year 264), Xiang Chong entered the service of the Wei government and was appointed as the Administrator (太守) of Zitong Commandery (梓潼郡; around present-day Mianyang, Sichuan). In the 12th month of the next year (the Chinese year 265), (Note: corresponding to 23 Jan to 21 Feb 266 in the Julian calendar. Sima Yan's actual coronation was on the bingyin day of that month (8 Feb).) Sima Yan became emperor and founded the Jin dynasty (as its Emperor Wu), fulfilling the prophecy of "Yán Rising". (Note: Jin historian Sun Sheng noted that in the past Gongsun Shu rose in Chengdu (against Emperor Guangwu of Han) and his state was named "Cheng"; those jade engravings were probably made by him.)

== See also ==
- Lists of people of the Three Kingdoms
