= Xiangyun (Auspicious clouds) =

Traditional Chinese auspicious clouds

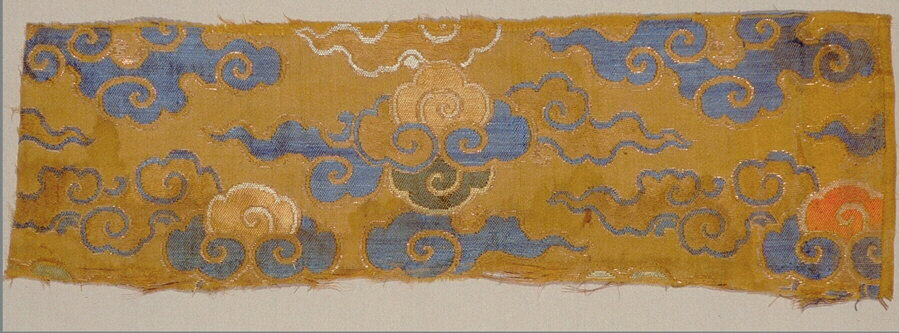
- Auspicious clouds, China, 17th-18th century

Chinese name
- Traditional Chinese: 祥雲
- Simplified Chinese: 祥云
- Literal meaning: Auspicious clouds
- Hanyu Pinyin: Xiángyún

Japanese name
- Kanji: 瑞雲
- Katakana: ずいうん
- Romanization: Zuiun

English name
- English: Auspicious clouds/clouds/lucky clouds

Xiangyun (simplified Chinese: 祥云; traditional Chinese: 祥雲; pinyin: xiángyún) are traditional Chinese stylized clouds in decorative patterns. They are also known as yunwen (云纹; 雲紋; 'cloud motif'), auspicious clouds, lucky clouds, and sometimes abbreviated as clouds (云; 雲; yún) in English. A type of xiangyun which was perceived as being especially auspicious is the five-coloured clouds, called qingyun (庆云; 慶雲; qìngyún), which is more commonly known as wuse yun (五色云; 五色雲; wǔsèyún; 'five-colour cloud') or wucai xiangyun (五彩祥云; 五彩祥雲; wǔcǎi xiángyún; 'five-coloured auspicious clouds'), which was perceived as an indicator of a kingdom at peace. (Note: Five-coloured clouds are red, blue, black, yellow, and white in colour.)

Xiangyun are one of the most auspicious patterns used in China and have a very long history. Clouds motifs have appeared in China as early as the Shang dynasty and Eastern Zhou dynasty. They are one of the oldest decorations and ornaments used in Chinese art, Chinese architecture, furniture, Chinese textiles and Chinese clothing. When used on Chinese textiles, xiangyun can take many various forms, including having the appearance of the Chinese character wan (卐; wàn) or the appearance of the lingzhi. (Note: The Chinese characters 'wan' (卐 and 卍) are used as auspicious symbols in Chinese culture; they were adopted from Buddhist visual arts which was introduced from India to China. In 693 AD during the Tang dynasty, Empress Wu Zetian declared the swastika the source of "all good fortune"; she thus named it 'wan', which is the homonym for the Chinese word wan (万) which means "ten thousands" or "infinity".) Xiangyun motif has been transmitted from generation to generation in China and is still valued in present-day China for its aesthetic and cultural value. Xiangyun was also introduced in Japan, where it became known as zuiun.

== Cultural significance and symbolism ==
=== Auspicious significance ===
Clouds motifs is rooted in agrarian society culture of the Chinese people. Clouds are associated with good luck as the cloud makes rain which moisten all things, and therefore, it brings good fortune to people.

In Chinese language, clouds are called yun (云; 雲; yún) which is a homonym for the Chinese character yun "good fortune" (运; 運; yùn).

In Chinese culture, clouds (especially the five-coloured clouds) are perceived as an auspicious sign (e.g. an omen of peace), a symbol of Heaven, and the expression of the Will of Heaven. (Note: "Xiangrui" is the Chinese term used to refer to "auspicious signs" which have been interpreted by the ancient Chinese people as the expressions of the Will of Heaven; the concept of Xiangrui is very old and can be traced back to the Eastern Zhou dynasty.) They also symbolize happiness and good luck.

=== Association with Taoism and Chinese cosmology ===
Chinese character Qi (气), Spring and Autumn period

The clouds physical characteristics (being wispy and vaporous in nature) were associated with the Taoist concept of qi (气; 氣), especially yuanqi, and the cosmological forces at work; (Note: In Chinese cosmology, qi (气) is often defined as a "vital energy", which is an essential matter of the universe.) i.e. the yuanqi was the origins of the Heavens and Earth, and all things were created from the interaction between the yin and yang. As the ancient pictograph of qi looked like rising steam, ancient Chinese believed that the Qi was the clouds and the clouds was the qi.

=== Association with deities, Chinese Immortals, and the Will of Heaven ===
Early in its history, clouds were often perceived under a ritual or liturgical lens where xiangyun were oftentimes associated with the presence of deities and were considered a good omen indicating the arrival of good fortune.

In Chinese mythologies, mythological creatures and deities use clouds as their mount. Clouds were also closely associated with the Chinese immortals (called xian) and their residence on Mount Penglai.

Xiangyun were also symbolic motifs which implied immortality.

In the Han dynasty, auspicious signs (祥瑞; xiángruì) were popular; the Han dynasty Emperors would interpret xiangrui as an indicator of the Mandate of Heaven. In that period, the sighting of xiangyun in the sky and its association its auspicious characteristics was recorded in the Chapter Fengshanshu 《封禪書》of the Shiji by Sima Qian, where it was described as "an unusual cloud formation [...] in the sky northeast of Chang'an a supernatural emanation had appeared, made of five colours [五彩] and shaped like a man’s hat"; the record continues with the following suggestion: "since Heaven has sent down this auspicious sign [referring to xiangyun], it is right that places of worship should be set up to offer sacrifices to the Lord on High in an answer to his omen". In this period, the people of the Han dynasty therefore interpreted the apparitions of the five-coloured clouds in the sky as an expression of the Will of Heaven.

== History ==
=== Ancient ===
Earliest yunleiwen pattern appeared in the Sanxingdui archaeological site, dated from 1131 BC to 1012 BC, on the jade zhang blade and on a bronze altar.

Cloud motifs in China appeared as early as the Eastern Zhou dynasty and earlier. They can be traced back to the vortex pattern used to decorate prehistoric painted pottery, to the yunleiwen (云雷纹; 雲雷紋; yúnléiwén; 'cloud thunder motif'), which somewhat resemble the meander patterns, and to the cloud scroll patterns which were used in the Warring States period. All these early depictions of cloud motifs however eventually evolved with time changing in shape and colours and further matured in the Han dynasty.

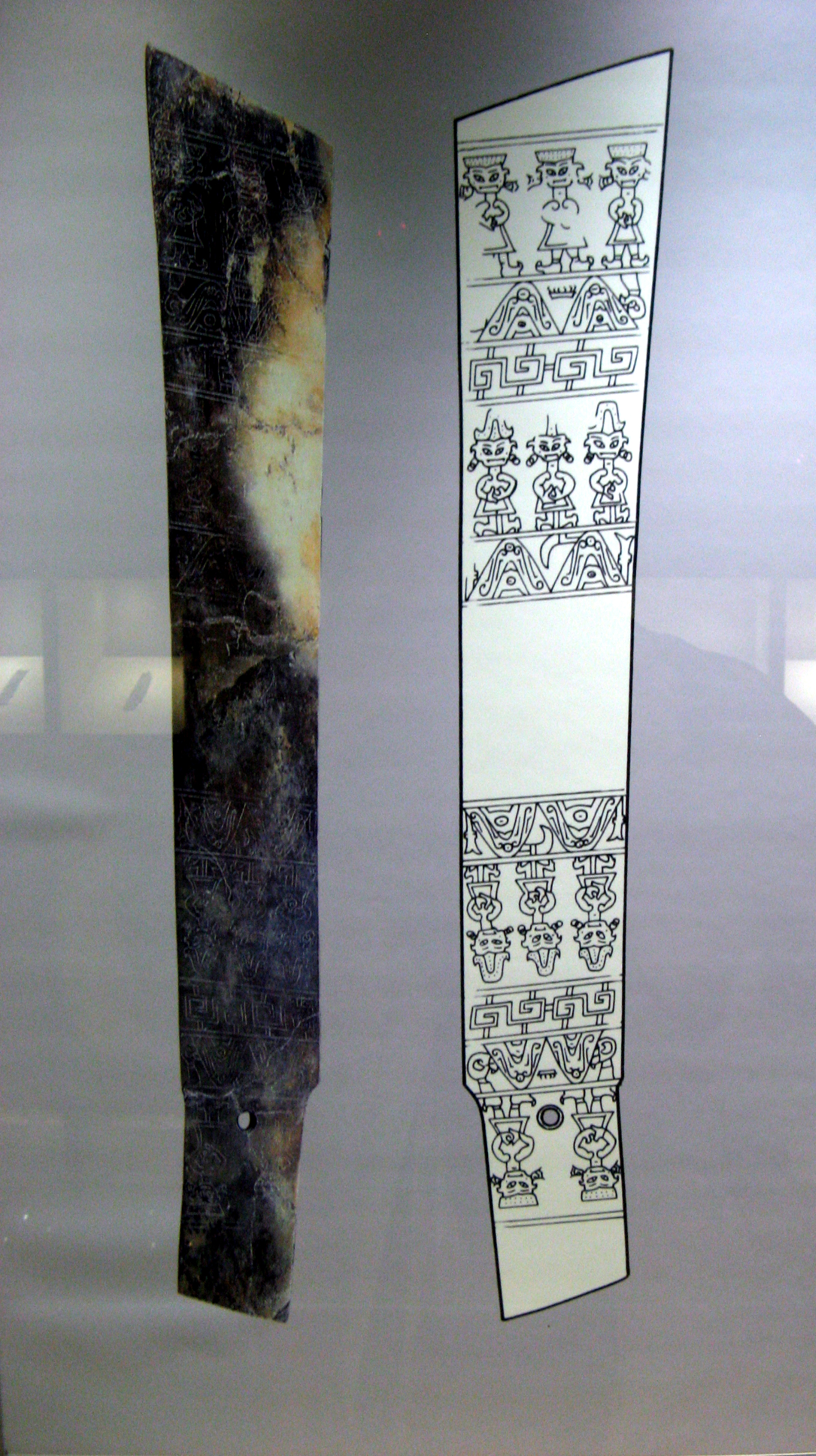
Large jade zhang blade, length 54 cm (21 in), Sanxingdui Museum

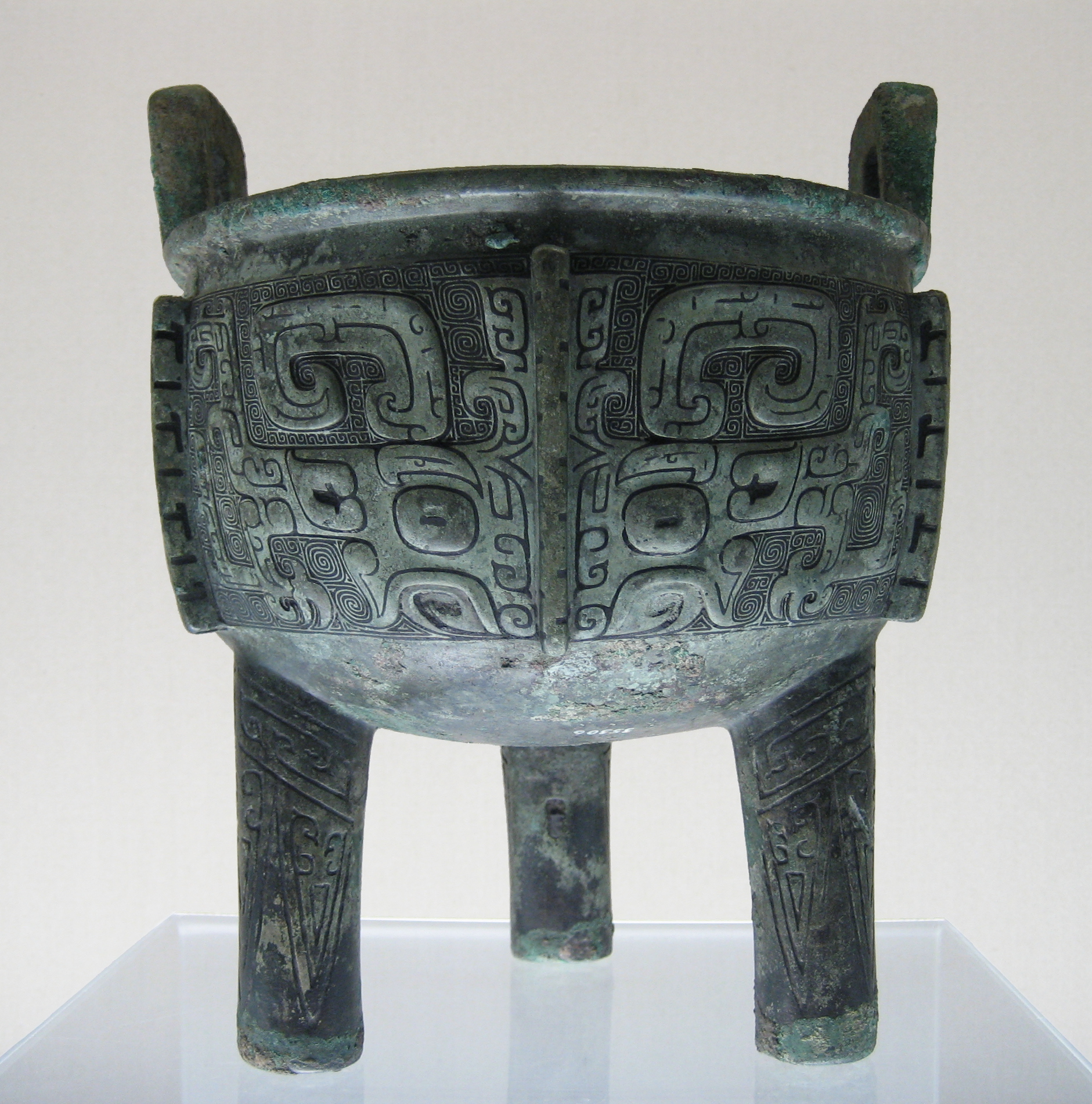
Shang dynasty bronze ding with yunleiwen around the Taotie.

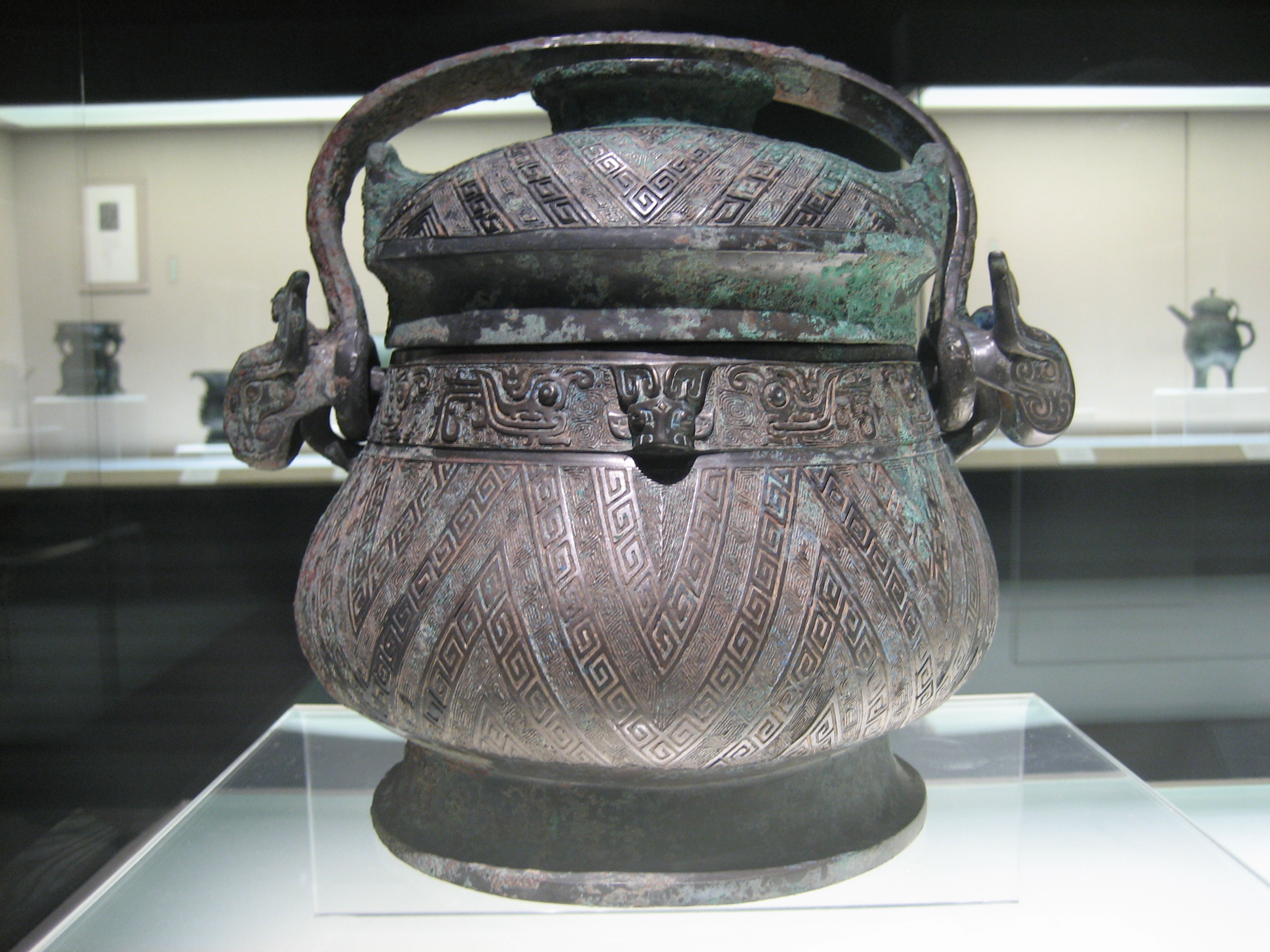
Zhou dynasty you-vessel with yunleiwen

Ink drawing of a Zhou dynasty vessel with lightning patterns recorded on Gujin Tushu Jicheng

Ink drawing of a Zhou dynasty vessel with cloud patterns recorded on Gujin Tushu Jicheng

=== Han dynasty ===
In the Han dynasty, stories on Chinese immortals became popular and the popularity of the cloud motif grew. The cloud patterns gained more artistic beauty which were associated with the concept of immortality and were formalized. These cloud motifs were then used in various ways, such as in architecture, clothing, utensils, and coffins. They were also combined with other animals (e.g. birds) and mythological creatures (e.g. Chinese dragons).

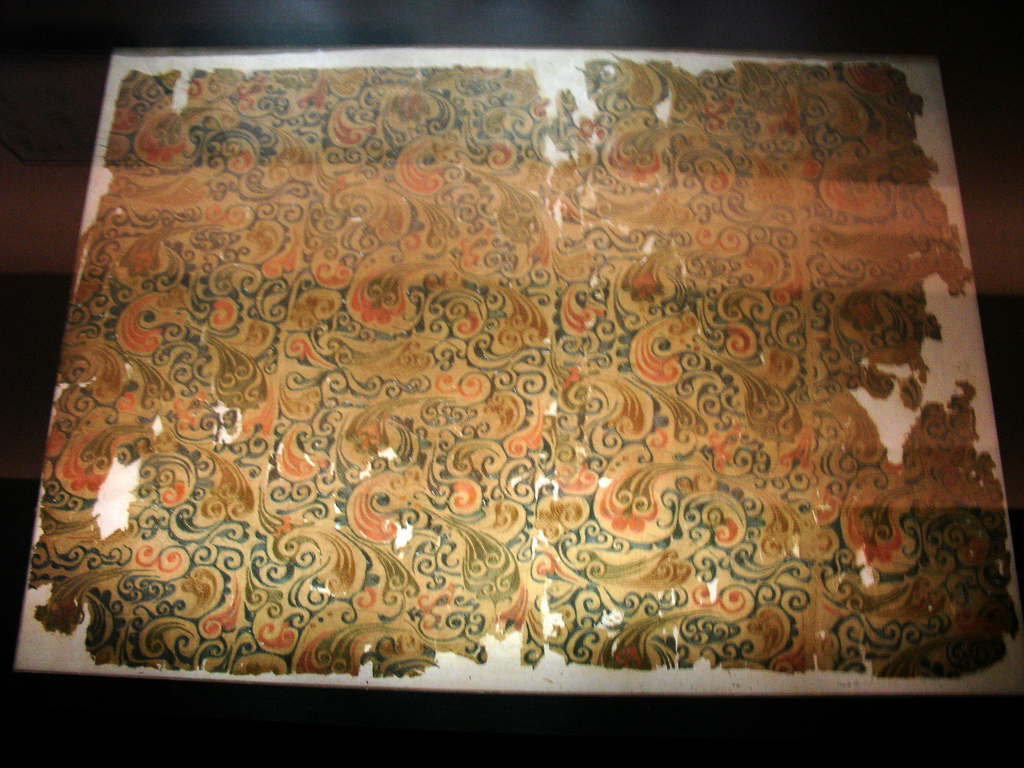
Early Han dynasty cloud motif as seen on silk from Mawangdui.

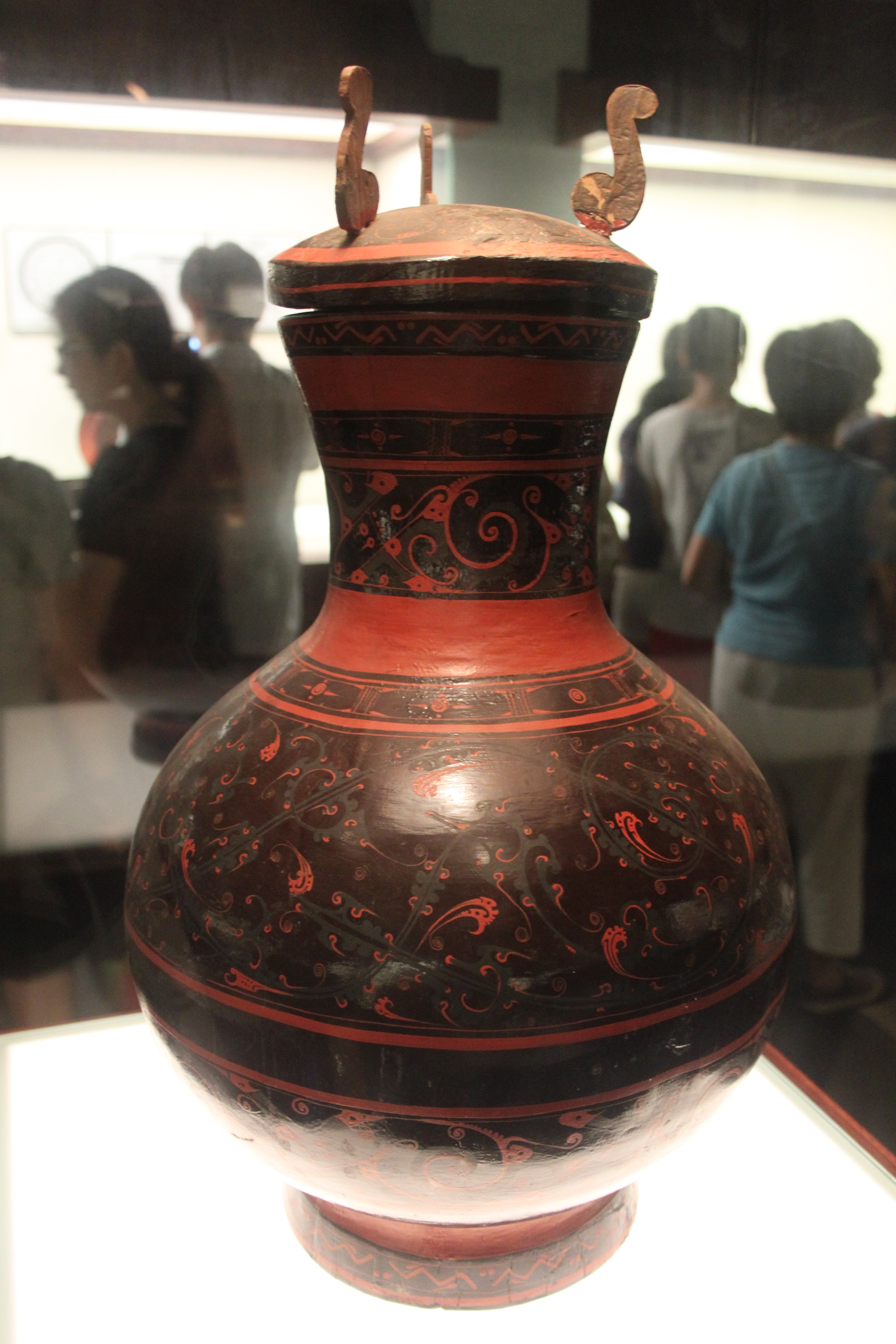
Cloud-motifs can be often seen on lacquerware of the Han dynasty.

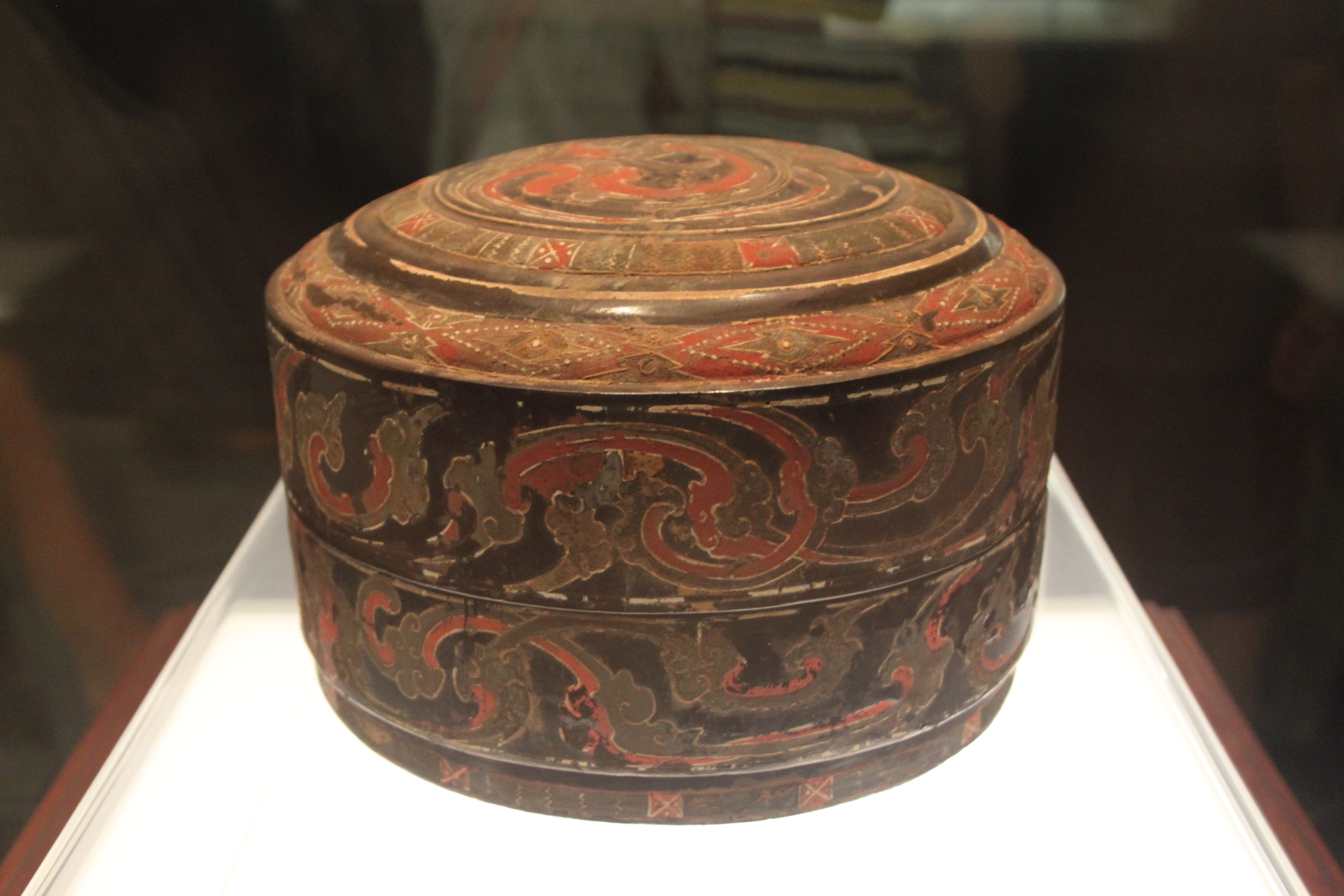

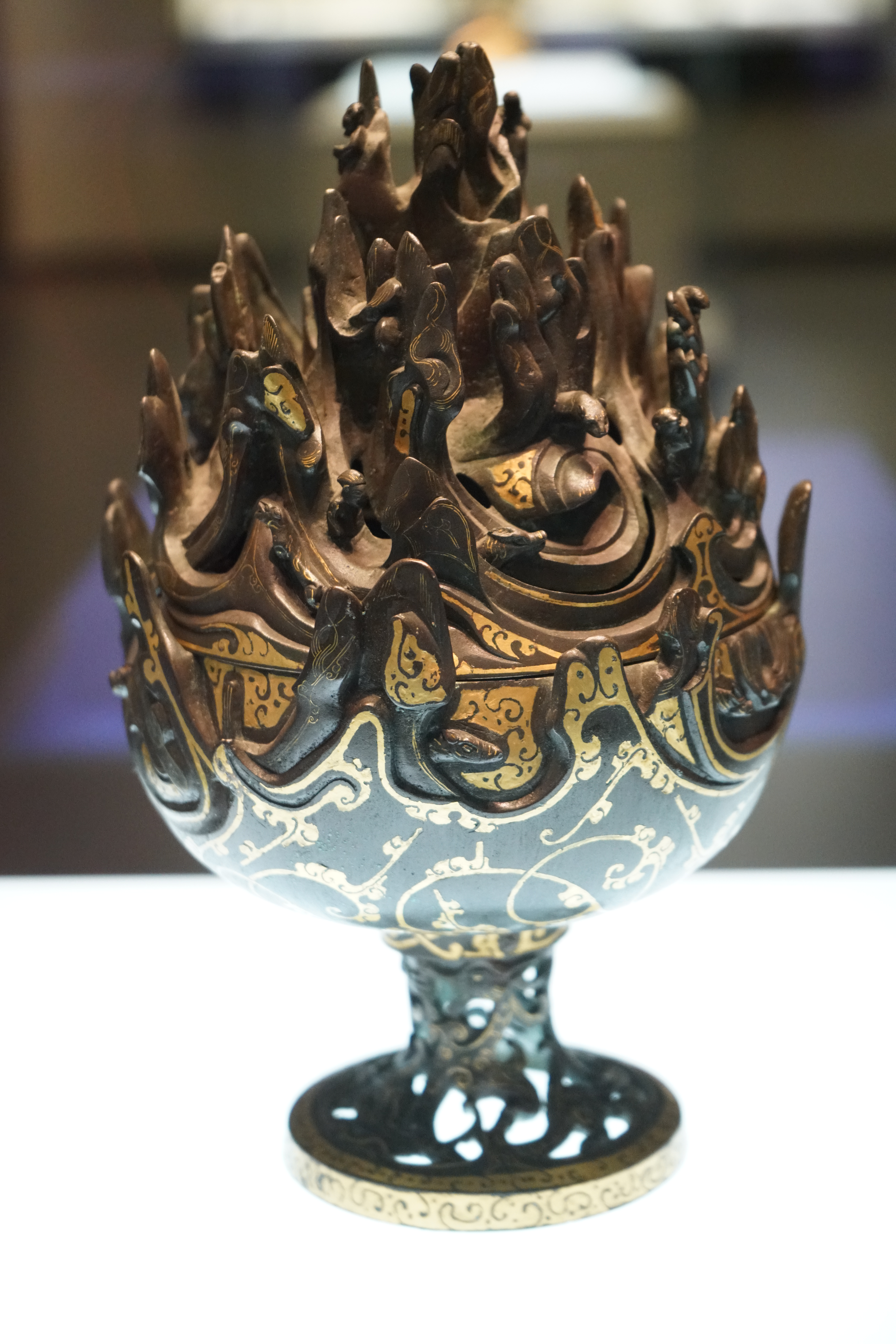
Hill censer from the tomb of Liu Sheng, Prince of Zhongshan decorated with cloud motifs

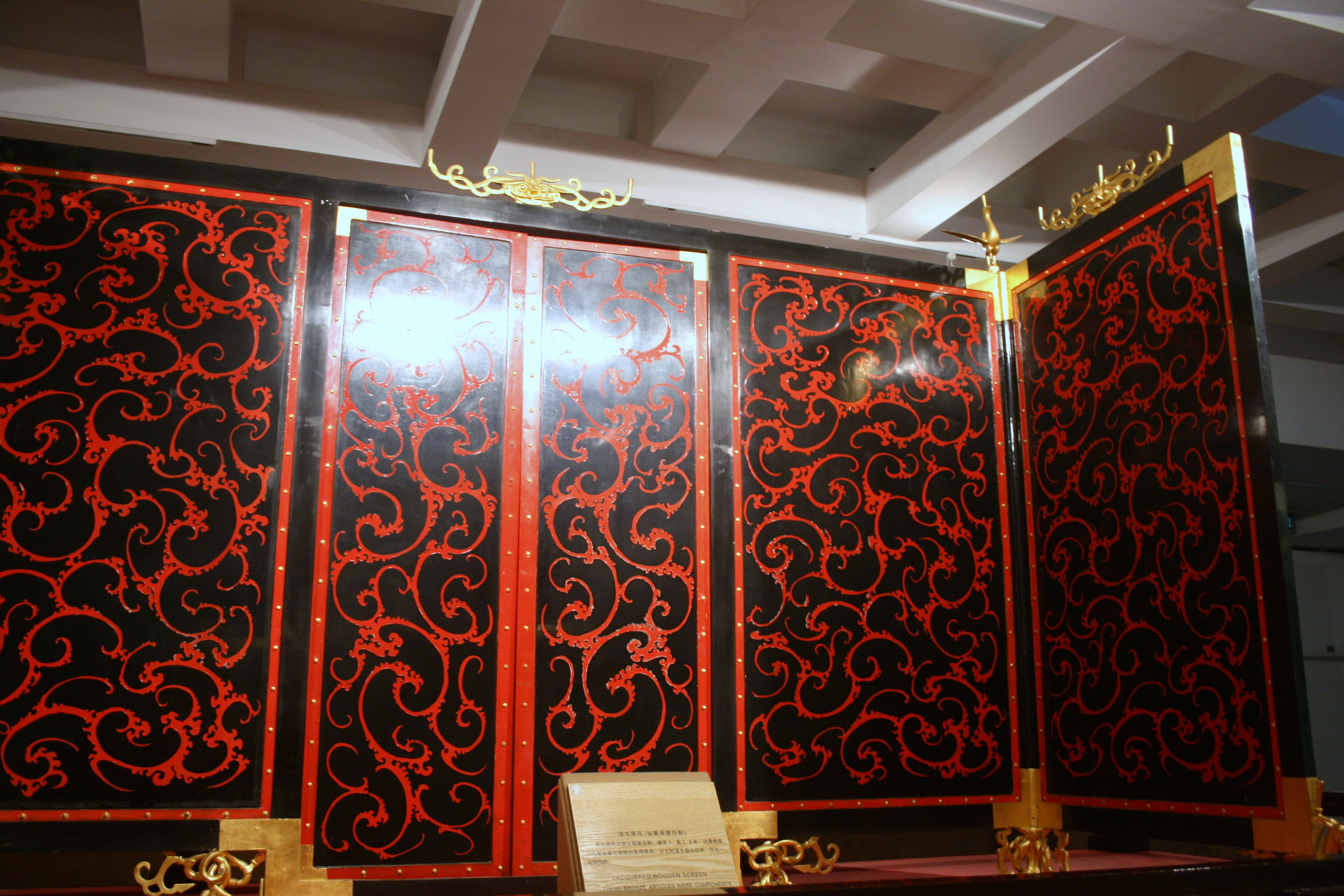
Lacquerware screen of Prince of Nanyue (reconstruction)

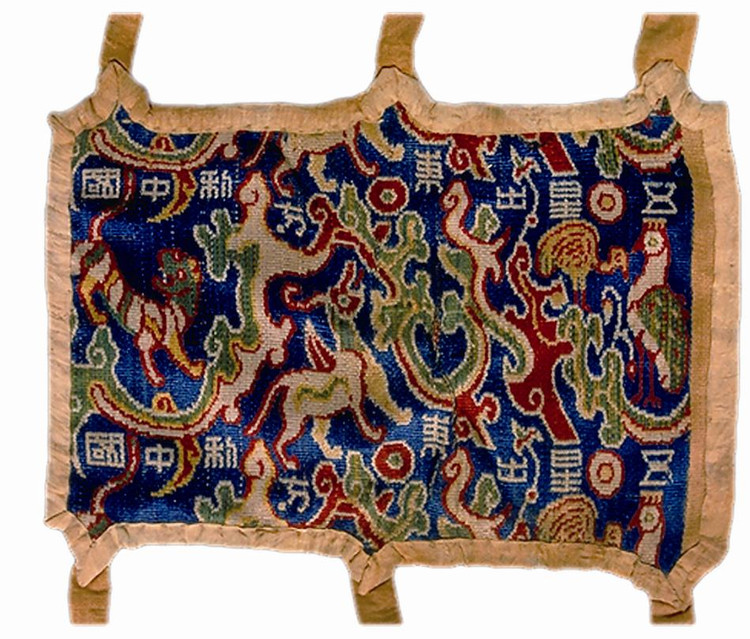
Eastern Han cloud motif.

=== Wei, Jin, Northern and Southern dynasties ===
During the Wei, Jin, Northern and Southern dynasties, the cloud motifs looked like streamers.

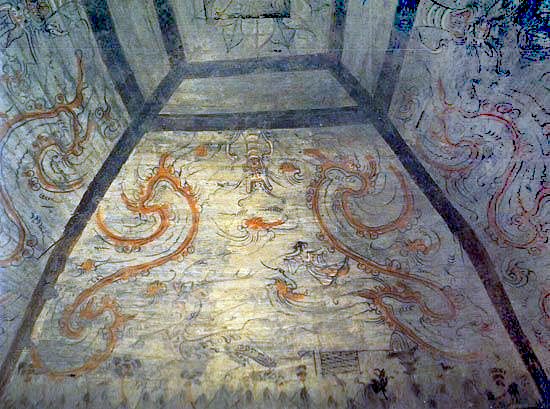
Aspara flying in the skies, illustrated in the Yanju's tomb

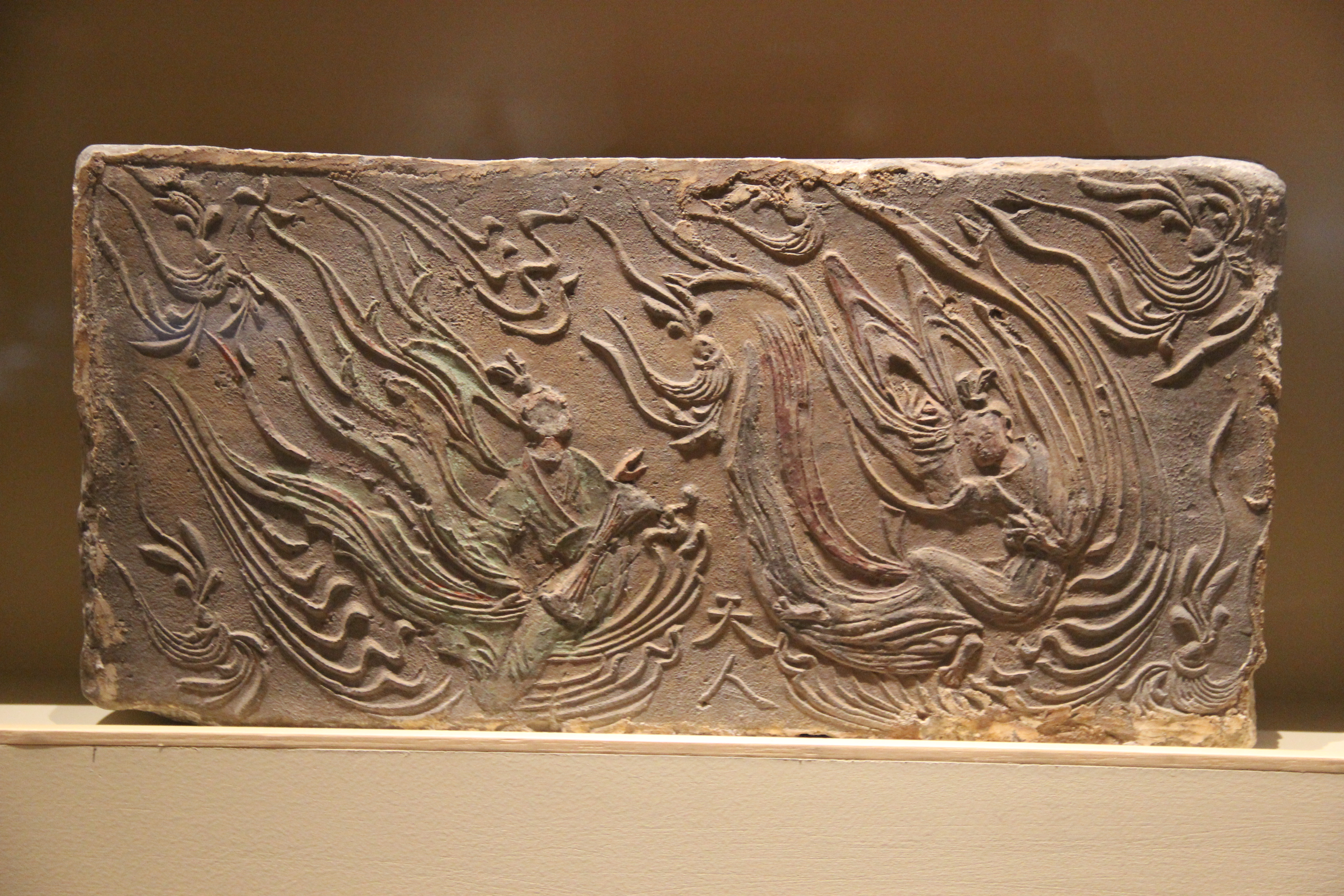
Flying immortals on Liu Song dynasty stone-relief

=== Sui and Tang dynasty ===
In the Sui and Tang dynasties, the cloud motifs looked like flowers; it looked realistic, plump, and very decorative. They became an established theme on ceramic ware since the Tang dynasty and would symbolize happiness or good luck. Their shapes became more and more diverse in the Tang dynasty and cloud motifs were coupled with the images of other creatures.

=== Song and Yuan dynasties ===
In the Song and Yuan dynasties, the cloud motifs were ruyi-like.

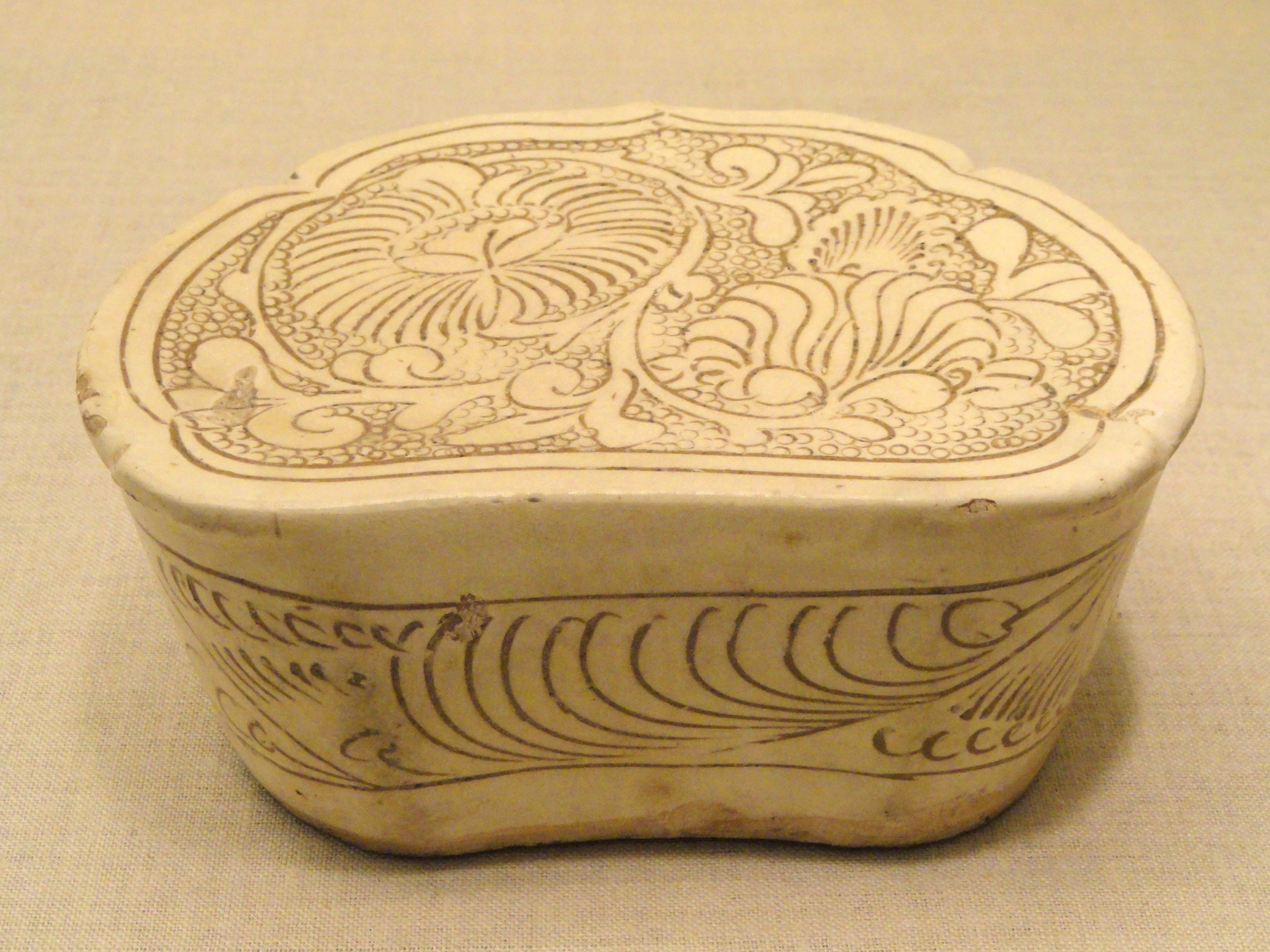
Cloud-shaped pillow

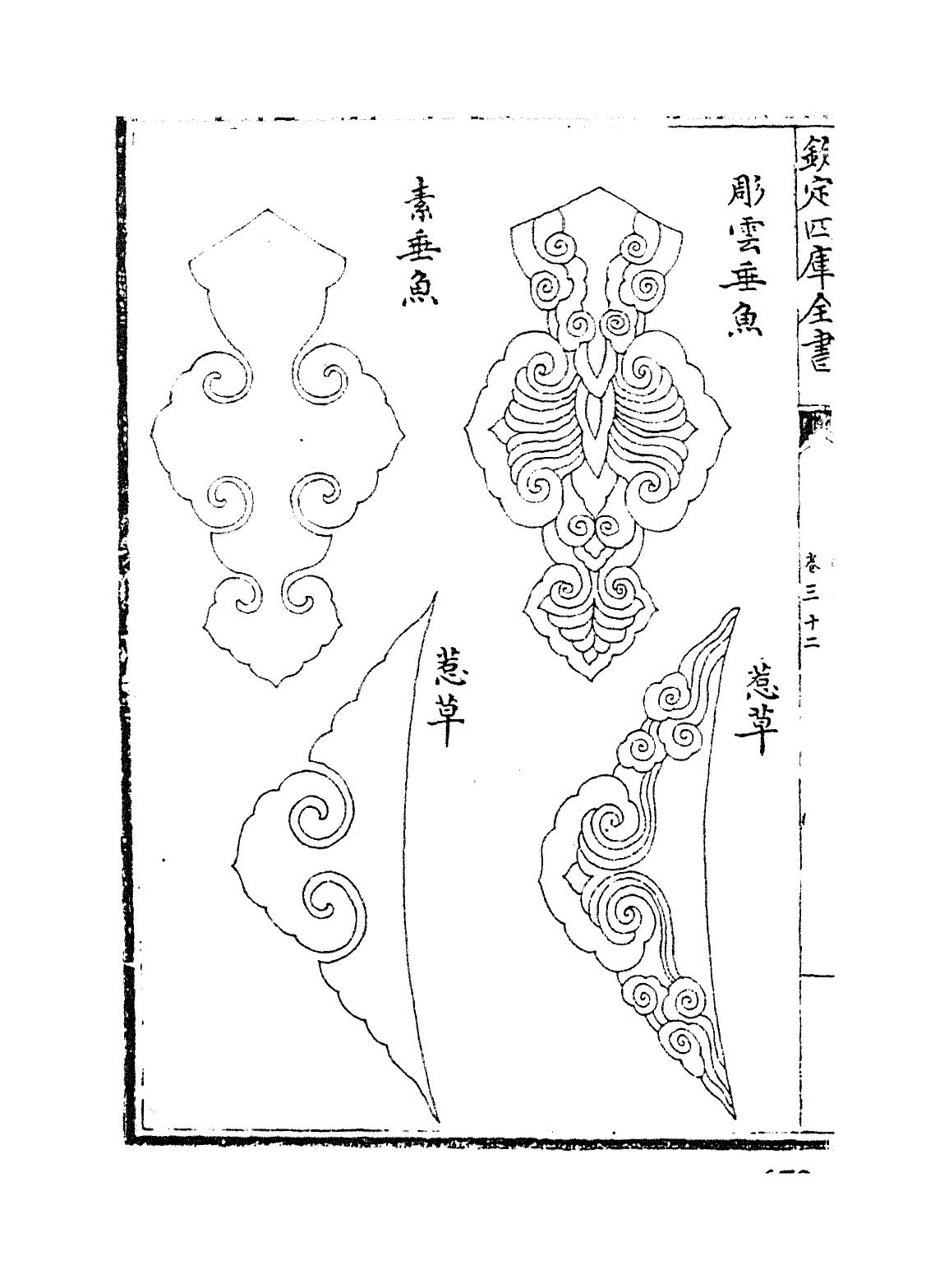
Cloud-shaped carving examples from Yingzao Fashi.

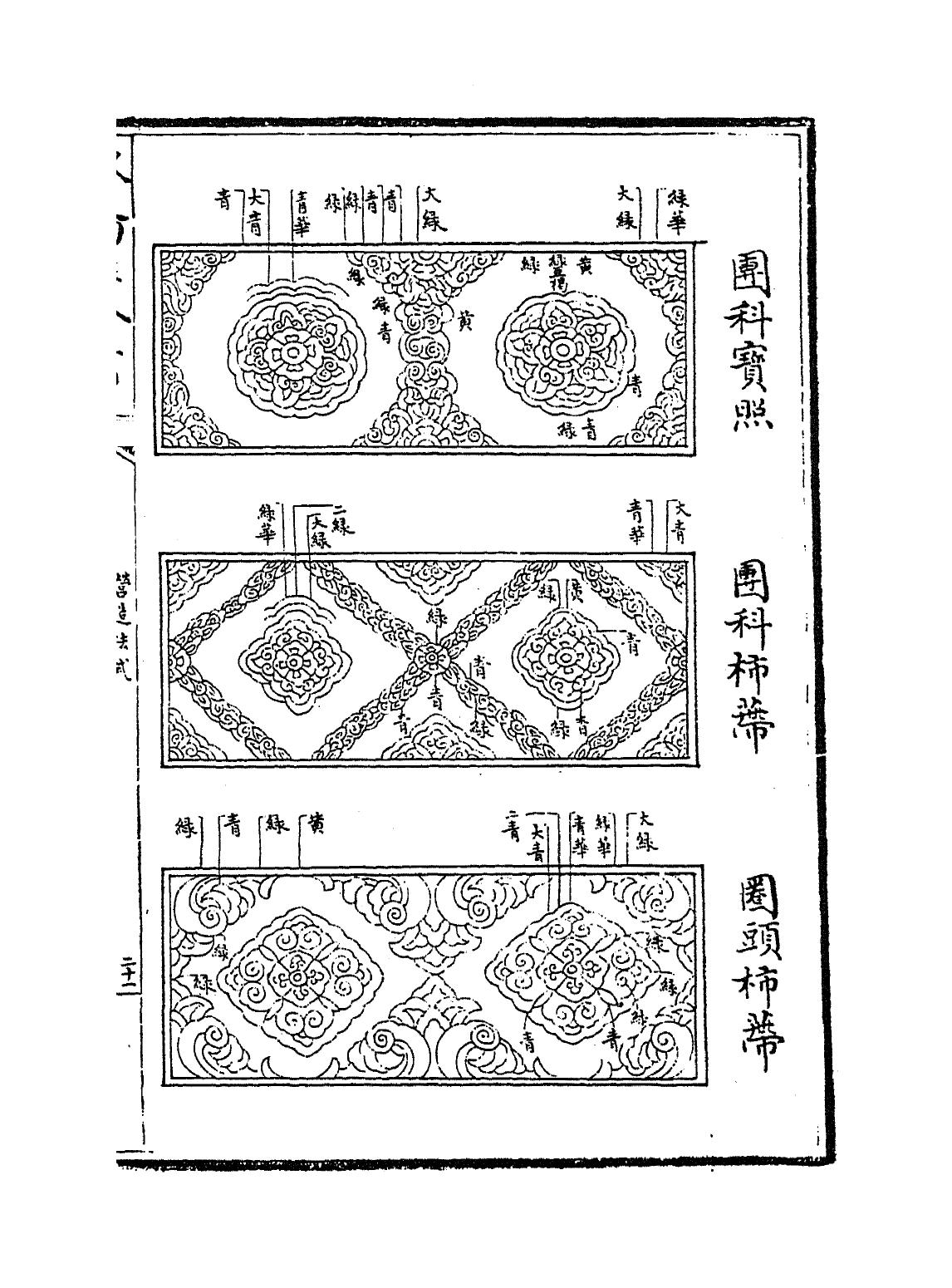
Ruyi-like cloud Caihua examples from Yingzao Fashi.

=== Ming dynasty ===
In the Ming dynasty, there was a unique form of cloud motifs which looked like a gourd.

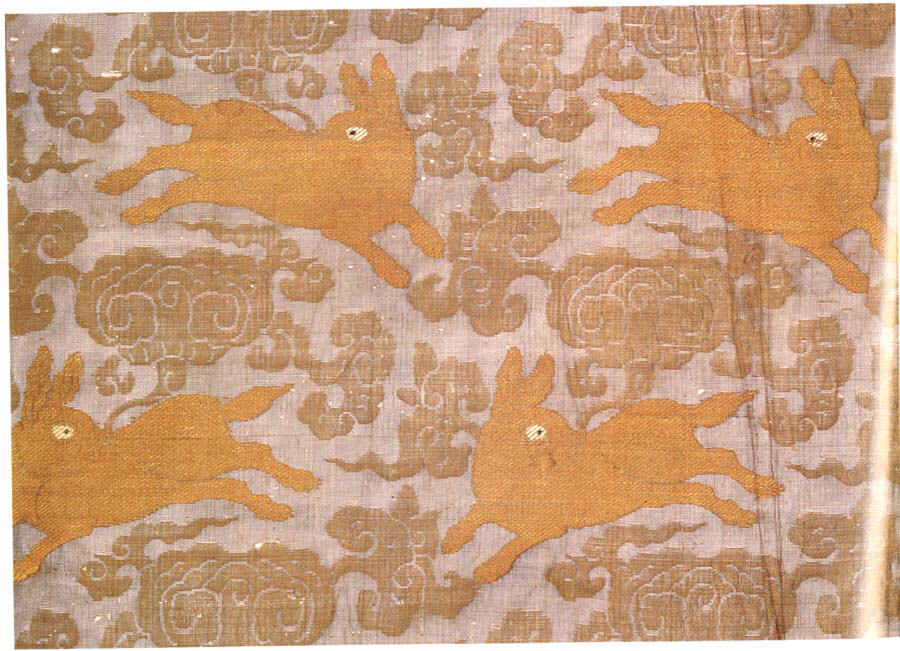

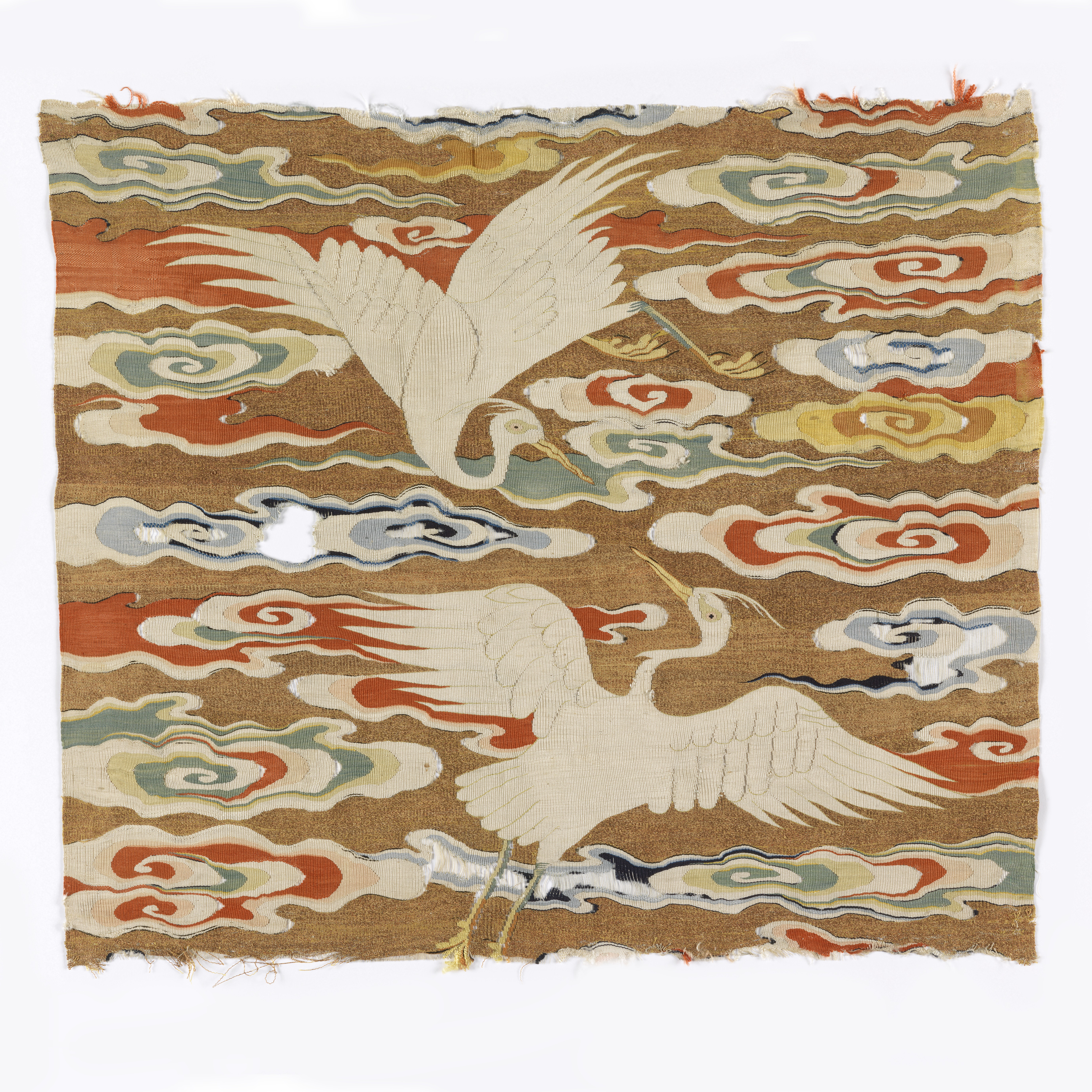

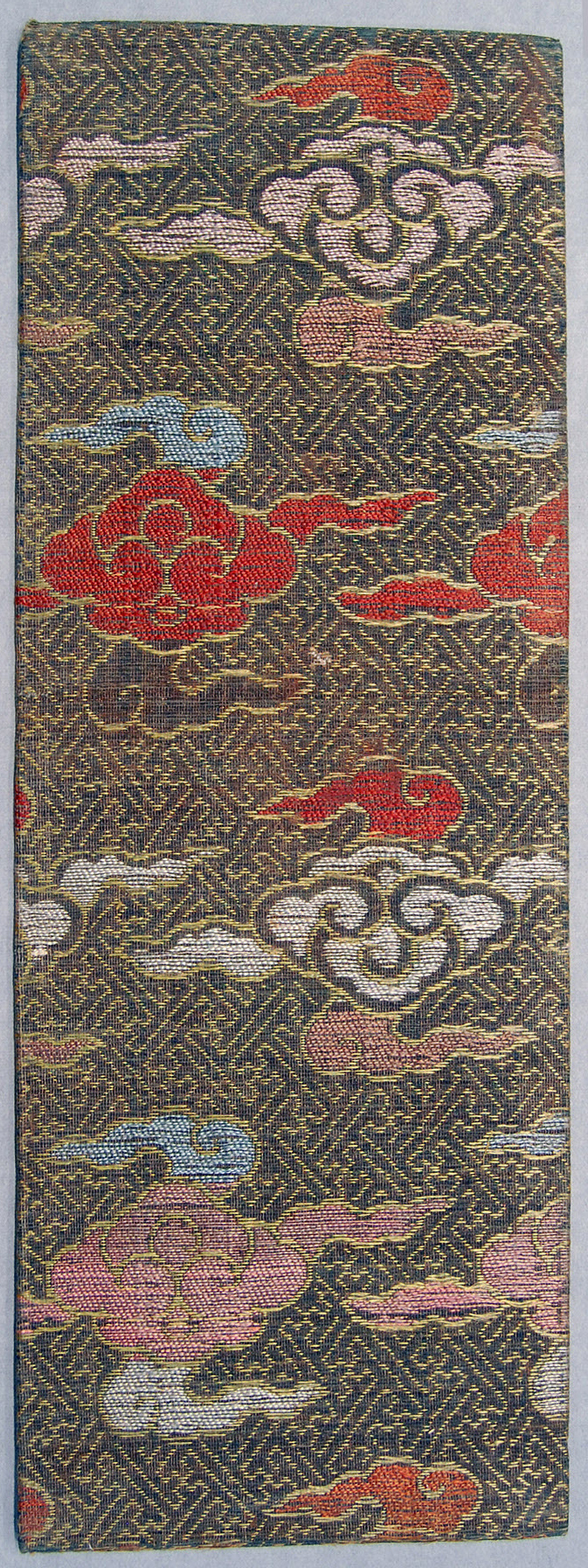

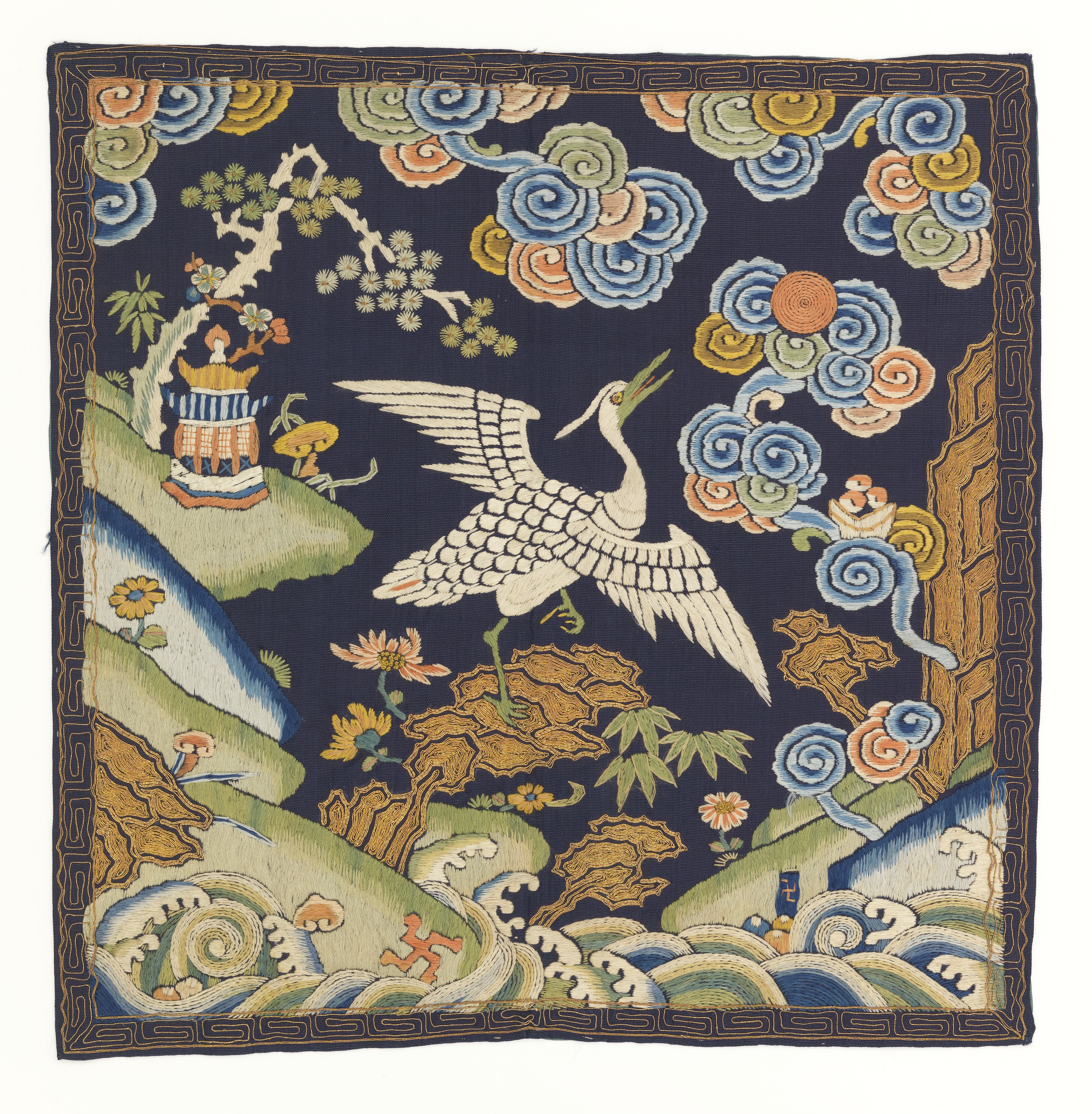

=== Modern ===
The yunleiwen patterns remained popular in modern times and continue to be used on contemporary tableware.

== Shapes of auspicious clouds ==
=== Yunleiwen/Yunwen/Leiwen ===
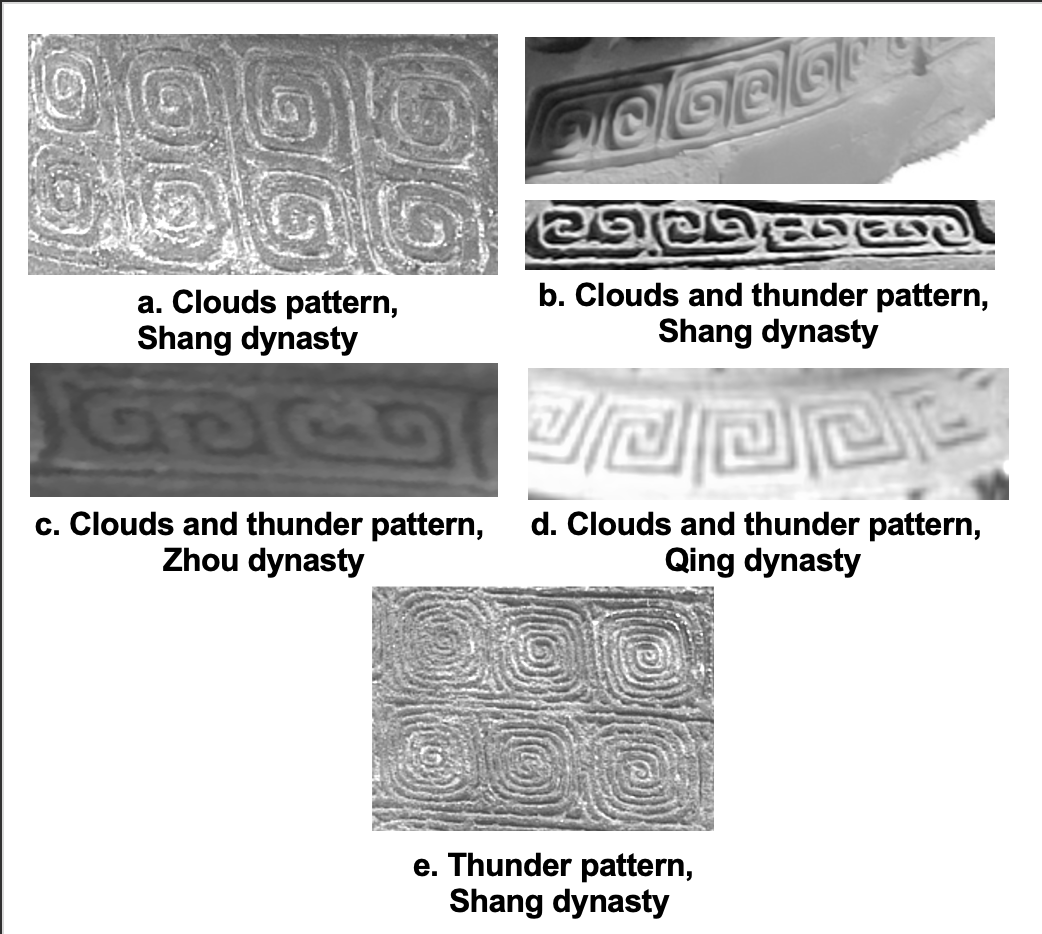
Example of various forms of yunleiwen motifs

The yunleiwen (云雷纹; 雲雷紋; yúnléiwén) was also known as cloud-and-thunder motif, meander border, or meander order in English. It was sometimes also referred as yunwen (cloud pattern) or leiwen (thunder pattern) in Chinese. It was a form of repetitive pattern similar to a meander. It came in various shapes; some looked like juxtaposed squared-off spirals; others looked like stylized angular "S" repeated designs which could be sometimes sometimes connected or disconnected.

The yunleiwen pattern was a symbol of the life-giving and the abundance in harvest that the rain would bring to the people in an agrarian society. The pattern may have been derived from the symbols and ancient characters for clouds and thunder which had been used by the ancient Chinese when performing the worship of rain rituals. The yunleiwen can be found in the textiles dating to the Shang and Zhou dynasties and in sacred bronze vessels of the Zhou dynasty.

The yunleiwen motif continues to be used in the 21st century as a border decoration on contemporary tableware.

== Influences and derivatives ==
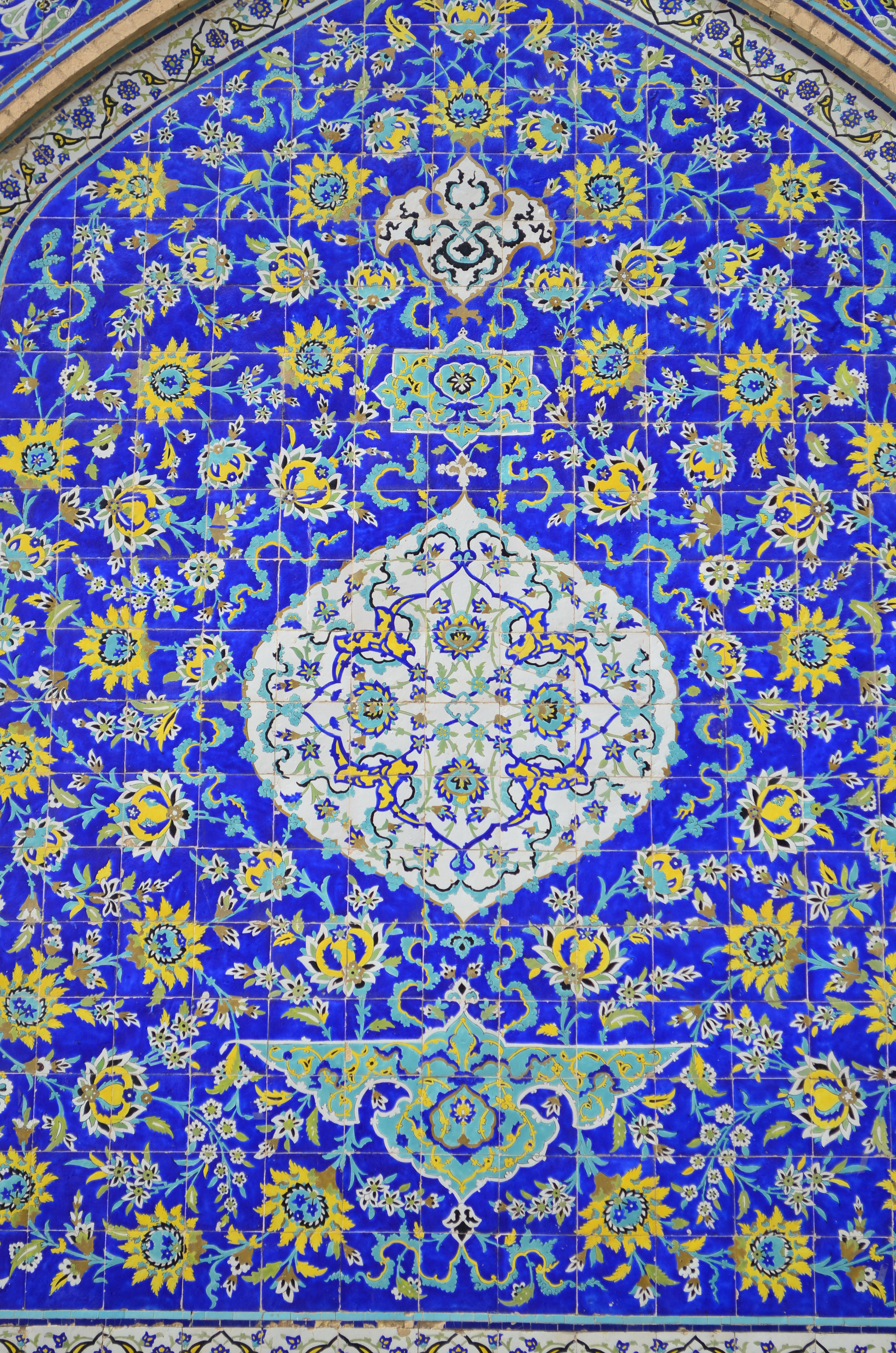
Tiles featuring 'cloud band' motifs, Sheikh Lotfollah Mosque, Isfahan, Iran

=== Central Asia and Islamic art ===
Chinese arts have increasingly impacted arts of Central Asia and Iran, such as painting and pottery, during the Tang dynasty. Under the Liao dynasty, the Chinese cloud motifs coupled with animal motifs were gradually introduced to Central Asia.

Following the Mongol invasion, Chinese influences on the arts of Central Asia and Iran reached its peak during the Islamic period; it was a period when Chinese models and motifs influenced Persian designs and thus, the Chinese ways of depicting clouds, mountains, trees and facial features were imitated and adopted. In the late 13th century, the Iranians especially favoured cloud motifs (often coupled with animals) in their arts, including textiles, and paintings as landscape elements.

=== Japan ===
Xiangyun was introduced from China to Japan where it became known as zuiun or Reishi mushroom cloud; under the influence of China, Japan started to use various forms of clouds designs in the Asuka period. They gained different names based on their shapes; e.g. kumodori (soft and drifting clouds). Zuiun is characterized by a swirly shape which looks like a reishi mushroom and also express an auspicious omen. Some clouds patterns in Japan were localized and developed from the shape of the Chinese clouds; such as the clouds developed by Ninsei. which were simpler in shape and were presented as mass of clouds instead of a group of clouds. Ninsei's cloud-style was then adapted and later evolved into cloud outline which were then applied on all types of Japanese ceramics.

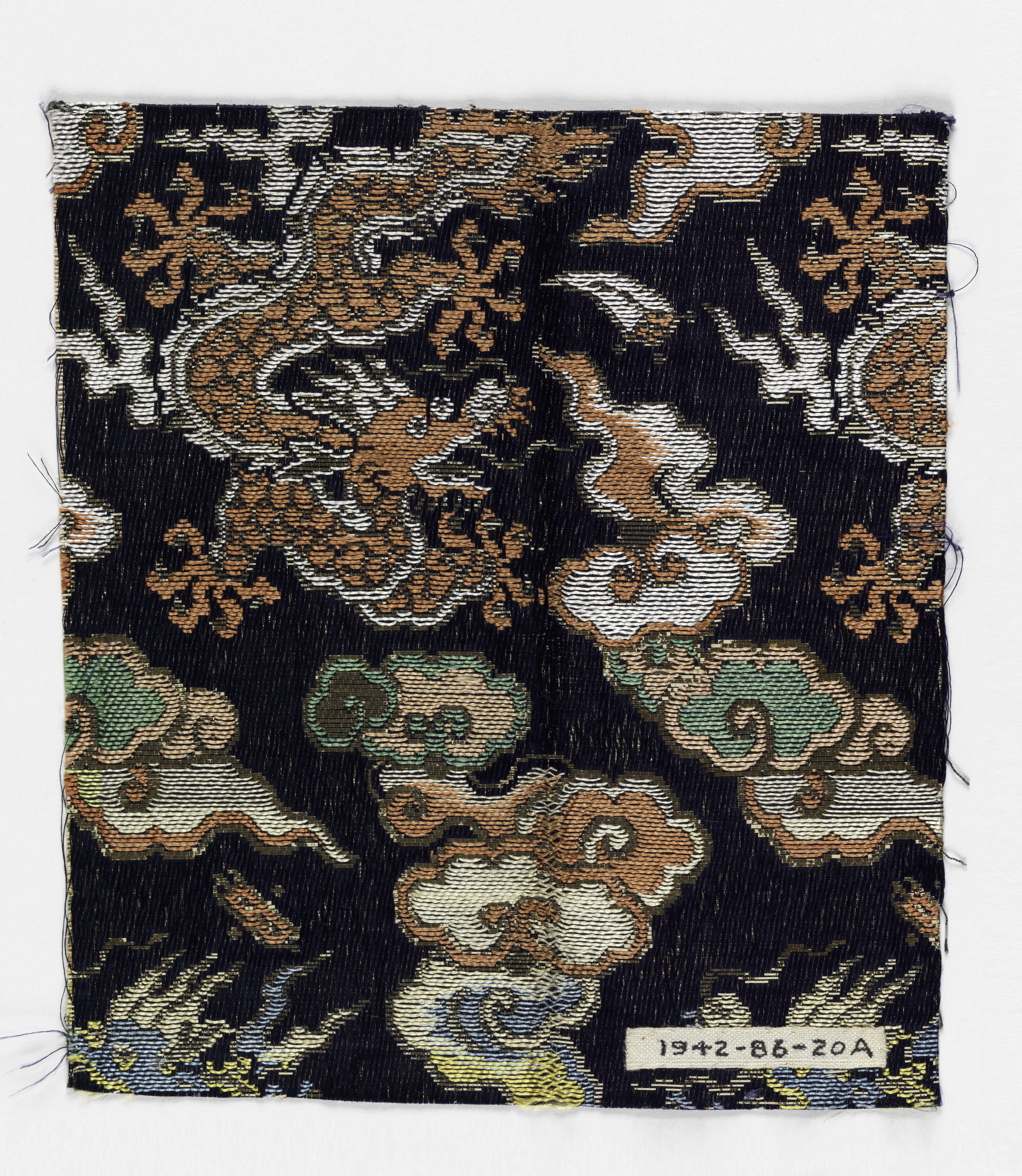

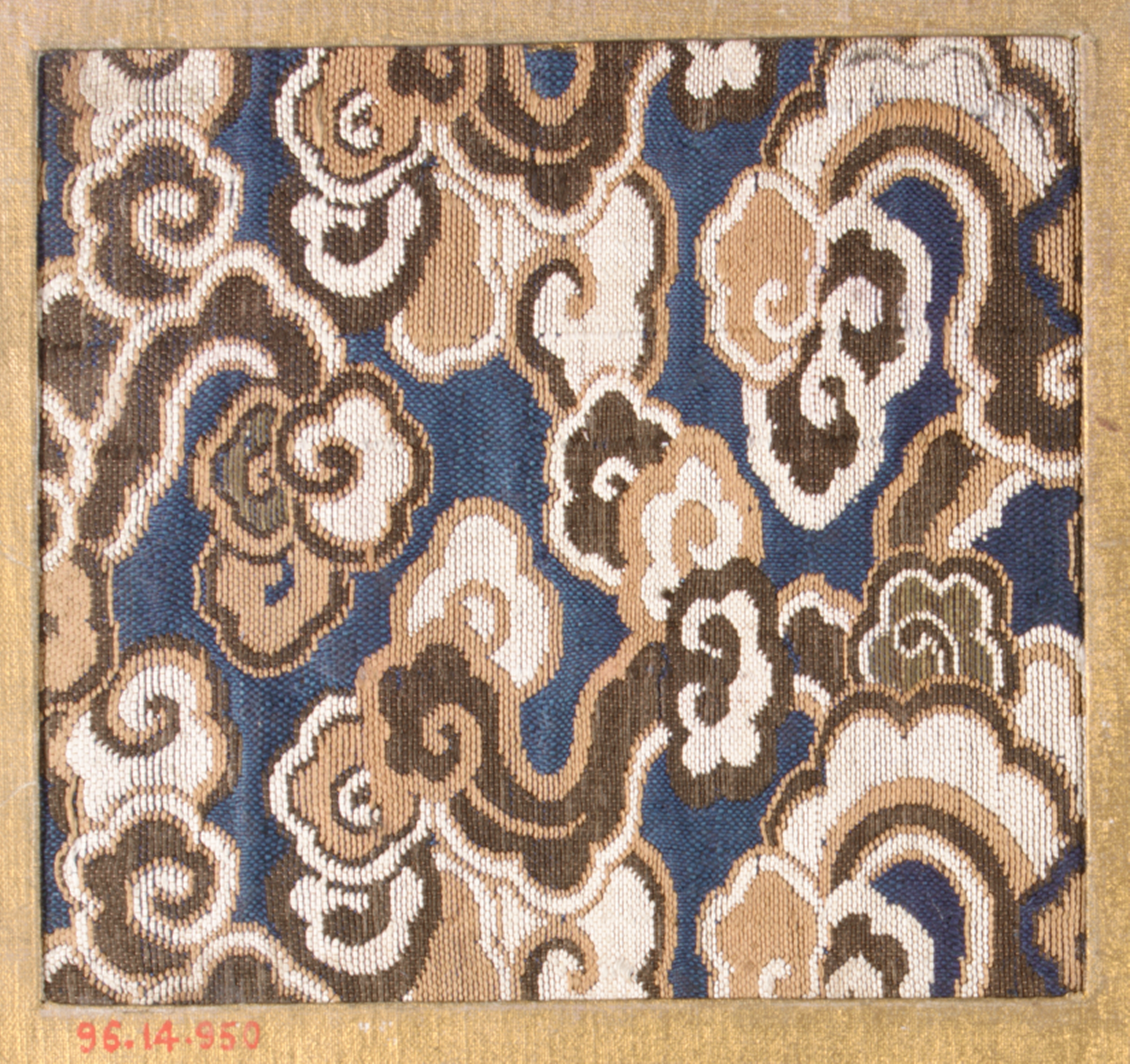

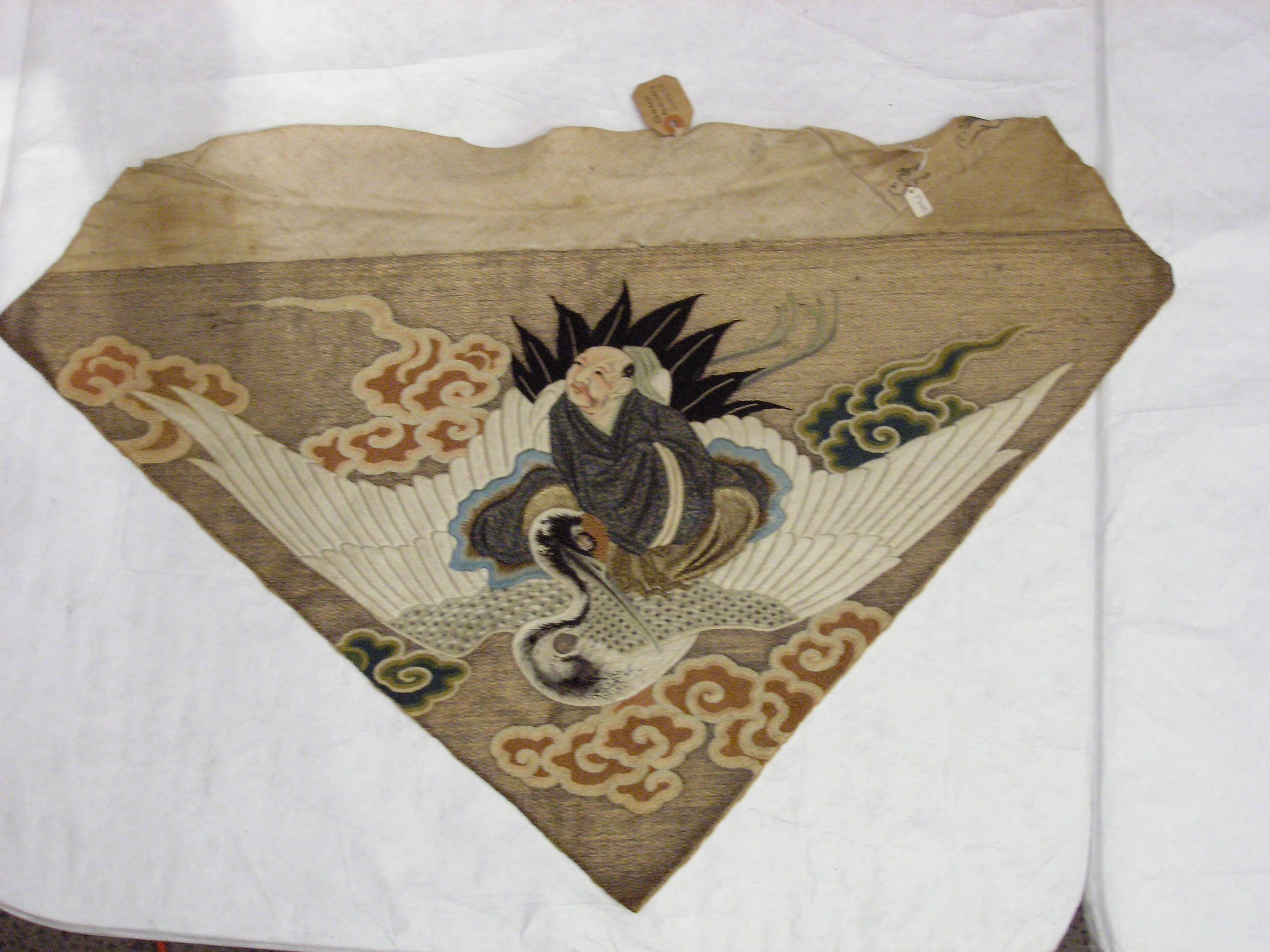

== See also ==
- Chinese auspicious ornaments in textile and clothing
- Chinese embroidery
- Chinese ornamental gold silk
