= Incense in China =

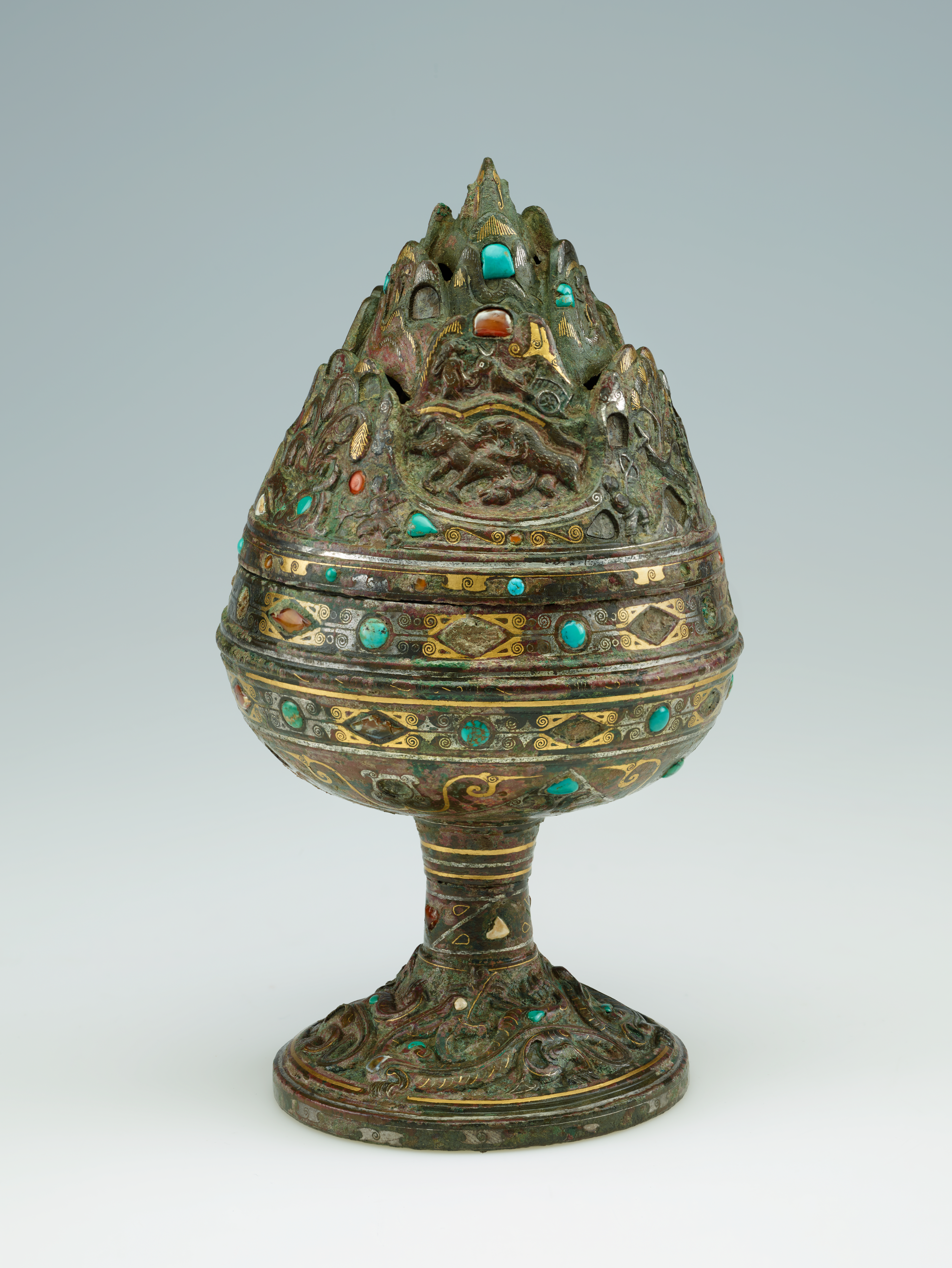
Lidded hill censer (xianglu) with geometric decoration and narrative scenes. Han dynasty, 2nd century BCE

Incense in China is traditionally used in a wide range of Chinese cultural activities including religious ceremonies, ancestor veneration, traditional medicine, and in daily life. Known as Chinese: 香; pinyin: xiāng; Wade–Giles: hsiang; lit. 'fragrance', incense was used by the Chinese cultures starting from Neolithic times with it coming to greater prominence starting from the Xia, Shang, and Zhou dynasties.

One study shows that during the Han dynasty (206 BC – AD 220) there was increased trade and acquisitions of more fragrant foreign incense materials when local incense materials were considered "poor man's incense".

It reached its height during the Song dynasty with its nobility enjoying incense as a popular cultural pastime, to the extent of building rooms specifically for the use of incense ceremonies.

Besides meaning "incense", the Chinese word xiang (香) also means "fragrance; scent; aroma; perfume; spice". The sinologist and historian Edward H. Schafer said that in medieval China:

there was little clear-cut distinction among drugs, spices, perfumes, and incenses – that is, among substances which nourish the body and those which nourish the spirit, those which attract a lover and those which attract a divinity.

— The Golden Peaches of Samarkand, a Study of T'ang Exotics, Edward H. Schafer

== Chinese censers ==
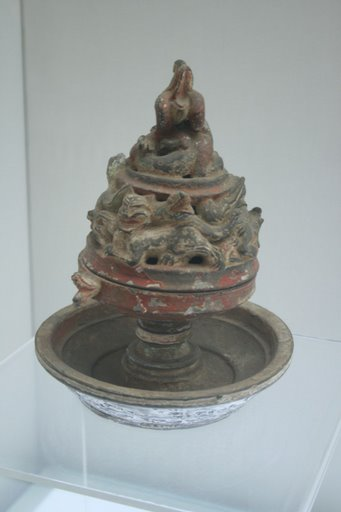
An Eastern Han ceramic hill censer

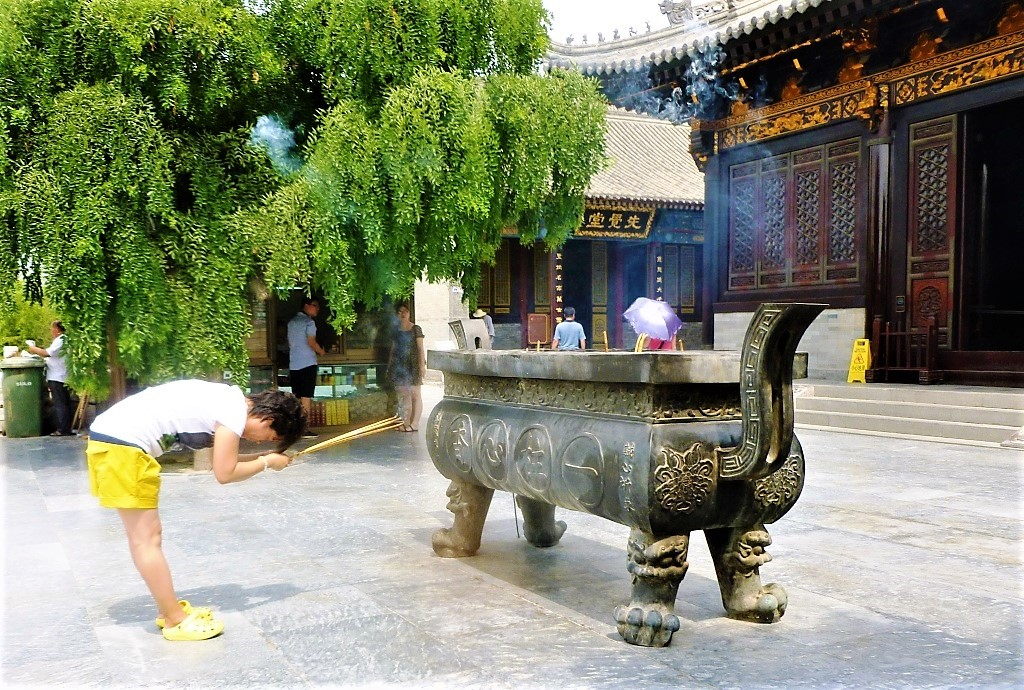
Bronze incense censer in front of Buddhist temple, Xi'an

The earliest vessels identified as censers date to the mid-fifth to late fourth centuries BCE during the Warring States period. The modern Chinese term for "censer," xianglu (香爐; "incense burner"), is a compound of xiang ("incense, aromatics") and lu (爐; "brazier; stove; furnace"). Another common term is xunlu (熏爐; "a brazier for fumigating and perfuming"). Early Chinese censer designs, often crafted as a round, single-footed stemmed basin, are believed to have derived from earlier ritual bronzes, such as the dou (豆) sacrificial chalice.

Among the most celebrated early incense burner designs is the hill censer (博山爐; boshanlu), a form that became popular during the reign of Emperor Wu of Han (r. 141–87 BCE). Some scholars believe hill censers depict a sacred mountain, such as Mount Kunlun or Mount Penglai. These elaborate vessels were designed with apertures that made rising incense smoke appear like clouds or mist swirling around a mountain peak.

Other popular designs include censers shaped to look like birds or animals, small "scenting globes" xiangqiu (香球), and hand-held censers shoulu (手爐). Very large censers, sometimes made to resemble ancient ritual bronze vessels, are often placed in the courtyards of Buddhist and Daoist temples.

== Uses ==
=== Medicine ===
Similar ingredients and processing techniques are involved in production of both incense and Traditional Chinese medicines. For example, take jiu (灸) "moxibustion"). Incense is believed to have physiological and psychological benefits. For instance, according to the Bencao Gangmu pharmacopoeia, "camphor cured evil vapors in heart and belly, and was especially recommended for eye troubles, including cataract."

=== Time-keeping ===
Along with the introduction of Buddhism in China came calibrated incense sticks and incense clocks (香鐘; xiangzhong; "incense clock" or 香印; xiangyin; "incense seal"). The poet Yu Jianwu (庾肩吾, 487–551) first recorded them: "By burning incense we know the o'clock of the night, With graduated candles we confirm the tally of the watches." The use of these incense timekeeping devices spread from Buddhist monasteries into secular society.

=== Religion ===
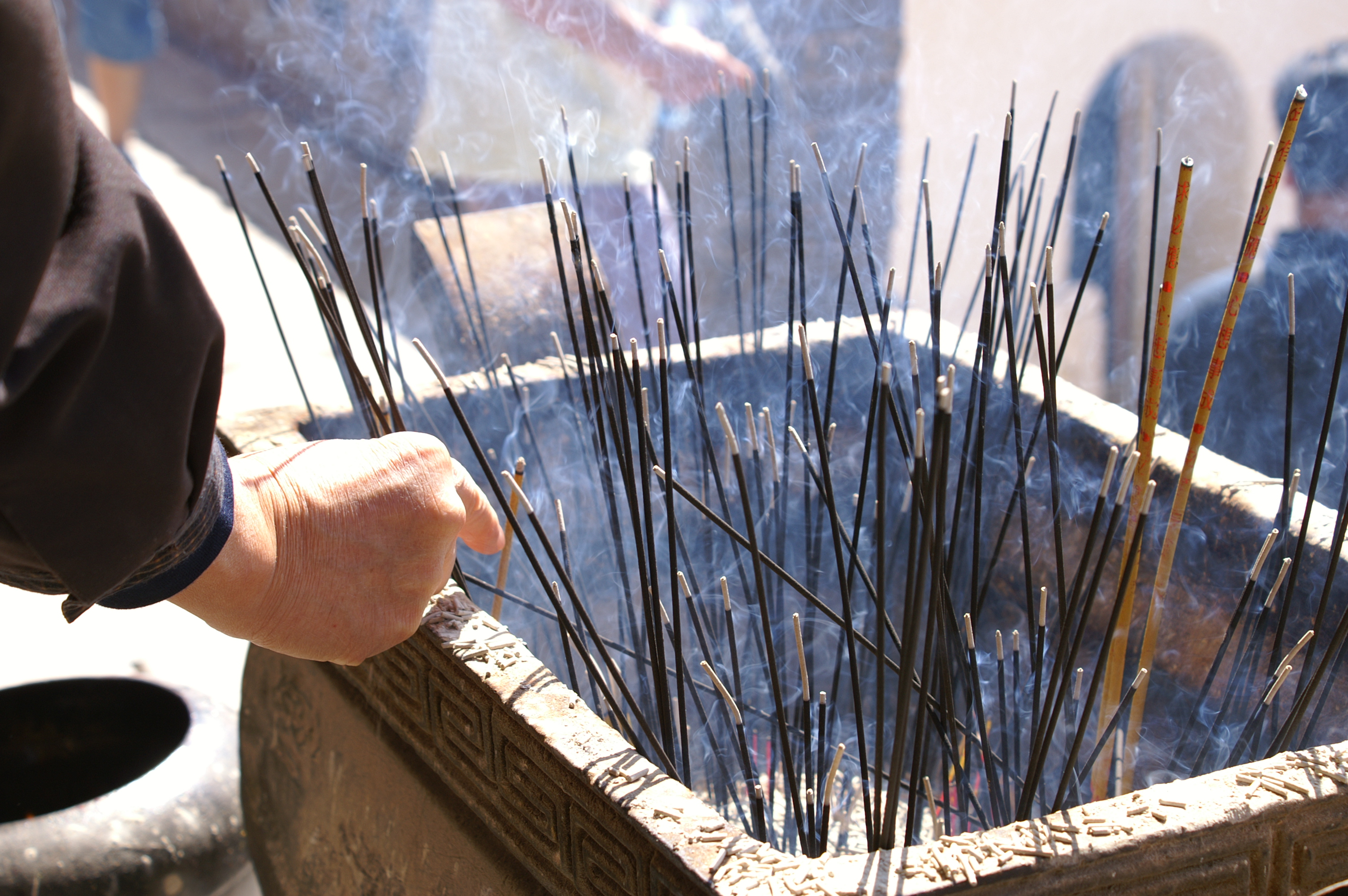
Burning incense at a Chinese temple

Xiangbang (香棒), with "stick; club" means "incense stick; joss stick". Two "incense" synonyms specifying religious offerings to ancestors or deities are gāoxiāng (高香; "high incense") and gōngxiāng (供香; "offering incense").

The Sunni Muslim Hui Gedimu and the Yihewani burned incense during worship. This was viewed as Daoist or Buddhist influence. The Hui, also known as "White-capped HuiHui", used incense during worship, while the Salar, also known as "black-capped HuiHui" considered this to be a heathen ritual and denounced it.

=== As an art form ===
The Chinese developed a sophisticated art form with incense burning like with tea and calligraphy called xiangdao (香道). It involves various paraphernalia and utensils in various ceramic containers utilised to burn incense. Examples include tongs, spatulas, special moulds to create ideograms with incense powder, etc. all placed on a special small table. It is most often used as an enhancement to a personal space to accompany other arts such as tea drinking and guqin playing.

== Production ==
=== Bamboo processing ===
Bamboo species with good burning characteristics are harvested and dried. The most common type of bamboo used for producing the sticks is Phyllostachys heterocycla cv. pubescens (茅竹,江南竹) since this species produces thick wood and easily burns to ashes in the incense stick. Other types of bamboos such as Phyllostachys edulis (毛竹) may be used, however due to their fibrous surfaces or relatively thin wood producing good bamboo sticks is more difficult. Longer incense stick are produced using cao bamboo (草竹).

The dried bamboo poles of around 10 cm in diameter are first manually trimmed to length, soak, peeled, and then continuously split in halves until thin sticks of bamboo with square cross sections of less than 3mm width have been produced. This process has largely been replaced by machines in modern incense production.

=== Incense materials ===
Chinese incense is made from diverse ingredients with much overlap into the traditional Chinese herbal pharmacopoeia. Of all the incense ingredients some of the most commonly used include:

- Chenxiang (沈香; "Agarwood, aloeswood")
- Tanxiang (檀香; "Sandalwood")
- Anxixiang (安息香; "Benzoin resin and wood, gum guggul")
- Cuibai (翠柏; "Calocedrus macrolepis, Chinese incense-cedar")
- Zhangnao (樟腦; "Camphor")
- Ruxiang (乳香; "Frankincense")
- Dingxiang (丁香; "Cloves")
- Bajiao (八角; "Star anise")
- Guipi (桂皮; "Cinnamomum cassia")
- Dahuixiang (大回香; "Fennel, Foeniculum vulgare")
- Dahuang (大黃; "Chinese Rhubarb, Rheum officinale")
- Hupo (琥珀; "Fossil Amber")
- Gansong (甘松; "Spikenard")
- Chuanxiong (川芎; "Sichuan Lovage, Ligusticum wallichii")
- Wujia (五加; "Siberian Ginseng, Eleutherococcus senticosus (Acanthopanax senticosus)")
- Beijiaxiang (貝甲香; "East African marine snails")
- Jiangzhenxiang (降真香) also known as zitengxiang (紫藤香), Lakawood

The dried powdered bark of Persea nanmu (楠木皮) is used extensively for its mucilaginous qualities, which helps to bind the other powdered ingredients together.

=== Processes ===
Incense powder is formed into the final product through various methods. In the Lin-xiang process incense powder is tossed over wet sticks. Nuo-xiang is when incense paste is kneaded around sticks. For large incense pillars, incense paste is piled around a single bamboo stick and sculpted to shape. Incense paste may be extruded and wound to produce spiral incense.

== See also ==
- Japanese incense
- Incense
- Incense Road
- Silk Road
- Spice
