= Liu Zhen (Western Han) =

Marquis of Lucheng (died 113 BC)

Liu Zhen 劉貞

Marquis of Lucheng (陆城侯)
- Tenure: 117 BC - 113 BC
- Born: Unknown
- Died: 113 BC
Names
- Family name: Liu (劉); Given name: Zhen (貞)
- House: Han dynasty
- Father: Liu Sheng, Prince of Zhongshan

Liu Zhen (simplified Chinese: 刘贞; traditional Chinese: 劉貞; pinyin: Liú Zhēn) was the son of Liu Sheng, Prince of Zhongshan, and the grandson of Emperor Jing of Han. According to the Records of the Three Kingdoms, Liu Zhen was granted the title of Ting Marquis of Lucheng (陆城亭侯) by the emperor Wu of Han. In the Han dynasty, a marquis was expected to pay an annual tribute of gold to the emperor, which was to be used toward the ritual sacrifices to the gods and ancestors. Failure to pay this tribute was considered to be an offense meriting the stripping of one's noble rank. Liu Zhen failed to pay the tribute, and was thus stripped of his marquis title. His family remained in Zhuo County, possibly until the time of Liu Bei, who may have been Liu Zhen's descendant. Liu Bei became the ruler of Shu Han in the Three Kingdoms period. Liu Zhen also appears in the fictional Romance of the Three Kingdoms in a chronology of Liu Bei's ancestors.

== See also ==
- Shu Han family trees

Marquis of Lucheng House of Liu
Chinese royalty
New title	Marquis of Lucheng; 117 BC – 113 BC	Loss of title
