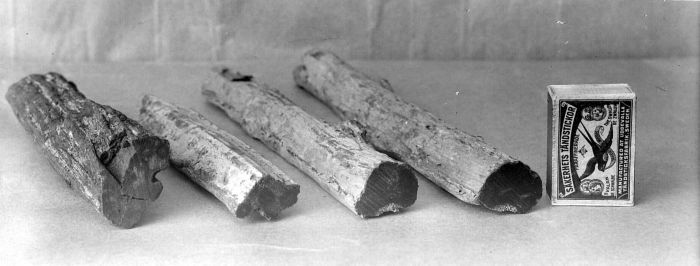
- Wood of Dalbergia parviflora

Conservation status
- Least Concern (IUCN 3.1)

Scientific classification
- Kingdom: Plantae
- Clade: Embryophytes
- Clade: Tracheophytes
- Clade: Spermatophytes
- Clade: Angiosperms
- Clade: Eudicots
- Clade: Rosids
- Order: Fabales
- Family: Fabaceae
- Subfamily: Faboideae
- Genus: Dalbergia
- Species: D. parviflora

Binomial name
- Dalbergia parviflora Roxb.

Synonyms
- Drepanocarpus cumingii Kurz; Drepanocarpus cuminghii Kurz; Dalbergia cumingii Benth. Amerimnon parviflorum (Roxb.) Kuntze; Amerimnon cumingii (Benth.) Kuntze; Dalbergia corymbifera Blume ex Miq. Dalbergia forbesii Prain; Dalbergia zollingeriana Miq.

= Dalbergia parviflora =

Species of legume

Dalbergia parviflora is a species of liana found in South East Asia. Its name is kayu laka in Malay and Indonesian, from which the word lakawood, the heartwood of the plant used for incense, is derived.

The plant is called khree in Thai, tahid-labuyo in Tagalog, in Vietnamese it is trắc hoa nhỏ (i.e. "small flowers" as in the scientific name). The genus Dalbergia is placed in the subfamily Faboideae and tribe Dalbergieae; no subspecies are listed in the Catalogue of Life.

The plant is a thorny liana that can grow to 30m in length. It has white flowers with bell-shaped calyx, and produces flattened obovate pods. It is found in many countries in South East Asia, from Burma and Thailand to Malaysia and Indonesia. It grows in the alluvial soil of secondary forest along the river banks and seashores, and in fresh-water swamp and Dipterocarpus forests.
