= Lakawood =

Tropical Asian wood used as incense

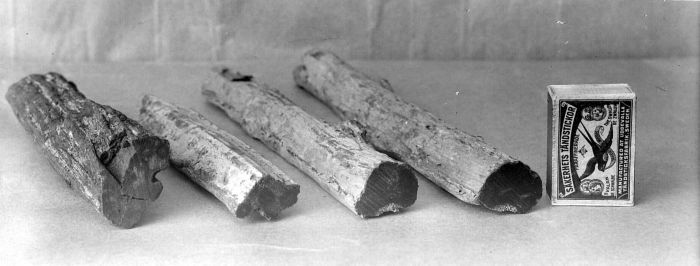
Dalbergia parviflora

Lakawood, or laka wood (Malay: kayu laka), is a reddish aromatic heartwood used as incense in China, India and South East Asia. It also had a number of other uses in the past, for example as a dye and for medicinal purposes. The name lakawood can refer to the wood of different plants, such as Acronychia pedunculata, A. Laurifolia, and in particular, Dalbergia parviflora found in South East Asia. Historically it was one of the most commonly-traded commodities of South East Asia in the trade between China and South East Asia from the Song dynasty onwards, possibly earlier.

== Names ==
The lakawood of Dalbergia parviflora is a product of the Malay Peninsula and Archipelago, and its native name in Malay is kayu laka (literally "laka wood"), from which the words cayolaque and lakawood are derived. In old Javanese literature, the word "laka" was also used to denote a shade of red on cloth, and the word manglaka meant "processor of laka-wood dye", although the tree from which the dye was derived from is Emblica officinalis. It is also called akar laka.

In Chinese, lakawood may be called jiangzhenxiang (降真香) or zitengxiang (紫藤香). The two names referred to different types of fragrant wood in the early period, but by the early 13th century, the two names were regarded as referring to the same product. The older term ziteng (紫藤, literally "purple vine", but is distinct from wisteria which has the same name in Chinese) has been identified as a plant grown in Southern China Acronychia pedunculata and A. Laurifolia. The fragrance from the wood was particularly appreciated by Taoists, and it therefore gained the name jiangzhenxiang meaning "the incense that summons the Perfected Ones to descend among us". Historical records however used two similar terms, jiangzhenxiang and jiangzhen, which may have been two different products. The fragrance and appearance of the heartwood and root wood from Dalbergia parviflora of South East Asia, known to have been imported into China in the 10th century, is similar to the earlier Chinese incense wood, it therefore became a substitute for the Chinese product. Lakawood was also once referred to as Tanarius major in some English sources.

== Uses ==
The wood has been used as incense in China from an early period, and it was said to be particularly favoured by the Taoists. It is powdered and mixed with other substances to make incense, commonly in the form of joss sticks. It was first mentioned in 304 AD as a preservative in wine and an incense wood for the summoning of spirit. During the Tang dynasty, it was used for magical and medicinal purposes, burnt in home to rid of all that is "weird and strange", and pieces of the wood were attached to children to ward off "evil vapours". The wood of Dalbergia parviflora often has no smell until it is burnt (but there as species which gently smell like a peach or peony even without being heated/burnt), and only a small amount is used in joss sticks due to its strong aroma. According to 16th century herbologist and doctor Li Shizhen, it was also used "as an astringent, as a wash to cleanse sores and to excite granulations, and as a deodorizing and disinfecting agent."

The sap of Emblica officinalis, also called laka, was used as a red dye by people of Java and the Malacca Strait area. According to Zhu Fan Zhi, the red-coloured sap of lakawood was once used as an ingredient in a product called "imitation dragon's blood" (imitation of a product from Dracaena cinnabari).

The essential oils found in Dalbergia parviflora are nerolidol, farnesol, furfurol, aryl-benzofurans, and neoflavonoids.

== Historical records ==
Ziteng was first described in 304 AD in a book on plants, Nanfang Caomu Zhuang (Plants of the Southern Regions) written by Ji Han, as having long and slender leaves, white flower and black seed. Its wood was chopped up and used as incense. The 9th century Tang poet Cao Tang (曹唐) wrote a poem on a Taoist theme that refers to the lakawood jiangzhenxiang: "Reddish dew gives me an image of upturning "the wine which extends life", Whitish smoke puts me in mind the burning of "jiangzhenxiang" ("the aromatic which brings down the True Ones")".

Lakawood from South East Asia was first noted in 982 (early Song dynasty) as one of the 37 foreign products that could be freely traded in China. Descriptions of lakawood and its trade are given in accounts from the Sung and Yuan dynasty, Zhu Fan Zhi and Daoyi Zhilüe. These texts indicate that Lakawood was a product of various states in the Malay Peninsula, Singapore, Sumatra, Java, as well as Borneo. Daoyi Zhilüe also listed laka-wood as an export of the large-scale chiefdoms at Ma-li-lu (Maynila), Sulu (later the Sultanate of Sulu), and Min-to-lang (later the Sultanate of Maguindanao) in the modern-day Philippines. They suggest a significant trade in lakawood, but it was also regarded as a cheap import during the Song dynasty, such that people of Quanzhou be they rich or poor can afford to buy the incense to burn at the end of the year as a sacrifice to Heaven. Lambri in Sumatra was mentioned as producing the best quality lakawood. Laka wood is also mentioned by Zhou Daguan in his book The Customs of Cambodia describing his trip in 1297. The value of lakawood however increased during the Ming dynasty. The product was mentioned in accounts of Zheng He's voyages such Yingya Shenglan by Ma Huan during the Ming dynasty, and its value was considered high enough to be presented to the imperial court as tributes by various ports of Sumatra as well as Siam.
