= Liu Sheng, Prince of Zhongshan =

Prince of Zhongshan (died 113 BC)

Liu Sheng 劉勝
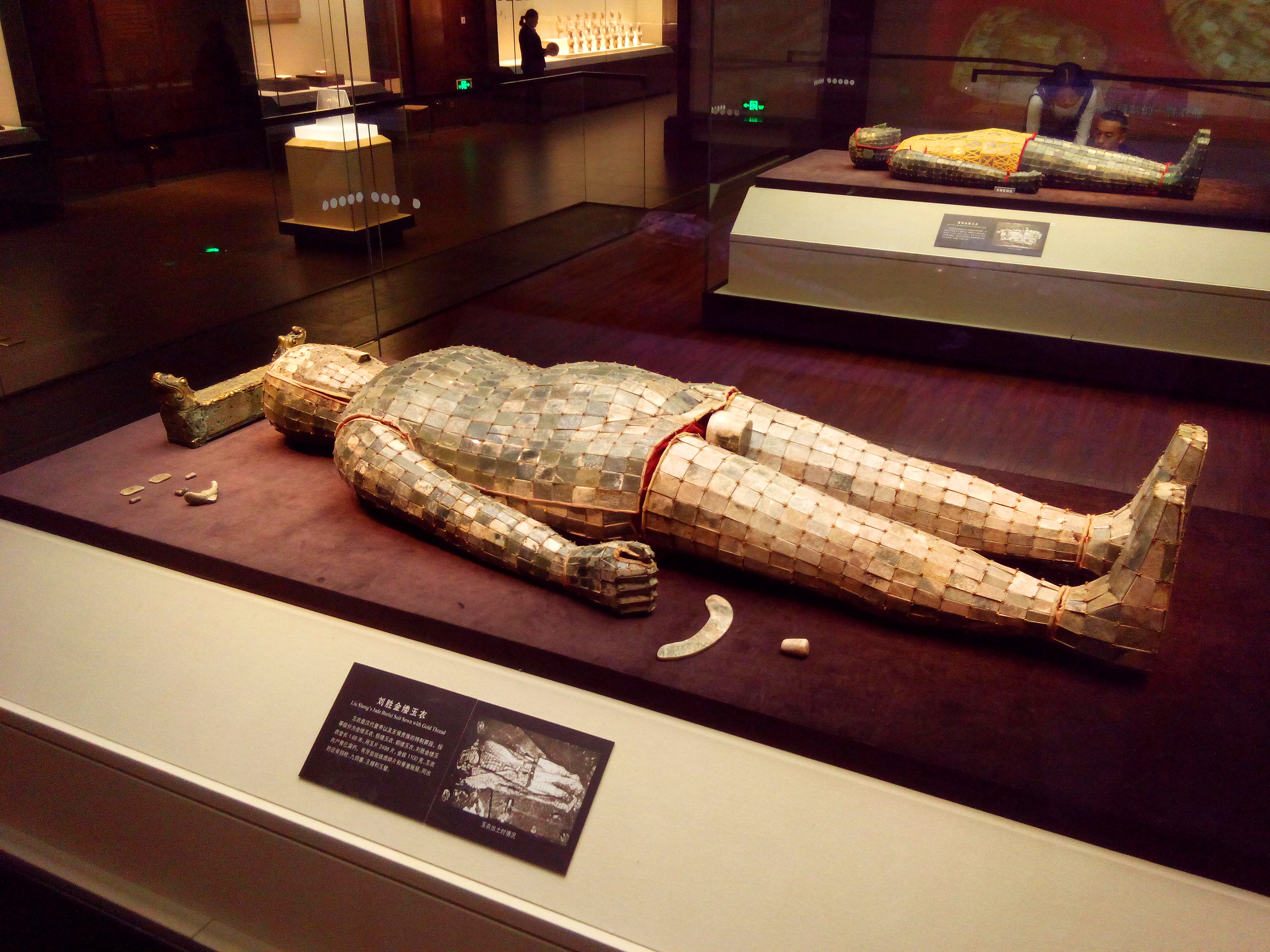
- The jade burial suit of prince Liu Sheng, Hebei Museum

Prince of Zhongshan (中山王)
- Tenure: 154 BC - 113 BC
- Successor: Liu Chang
- Born: Unknown
- Died: 113 BC
- Spouse: Dou Wan
- Issue: Liu Chang; Liu Zhen
Names
- Family name: Liu (劉); Given name: Sheng (勝)
Posthumous name
- Prince Jing of Zhongshan (中山靖王)
- House: Han dynasty
- Father: Emperor Jing of Han
- Mother: Consort Jia

Liu Sheng (simplified Chinese: 刘胜; traditional Chinese: 劉勝; pinyin: Liú Shèng; died 113 BC), posthumously known as King/Prince Jing of Zhongshan (Chinese: 中山靖王; pinyin: Zhōngshān Jìng Wáng), was a king/prince of the Western Han empire of Chinese history. His father was Emperor Jing, and he was the elder brother of Emperor Wu of Han. His mausoleum is one of the most important archaeological sites pertaining to the Western Han imperial family.

== Life ==
Liu Sheng was born to Emperor Jing of Han and Consort Jia, who also had another son, Liu Pengzu the Prince of Zhao. He was given the fief of Zhongshan by his father in 154 BC, and therefore reigned in the period right after the Rebellion of the Seven States, when the political atmosphere was one of suspicion regarding the feudal states. Given this atmosphere Liu Sheng was one of the more successful feudal rulers.

In the third year of the reign of Emperor Wu, his younger brother, Liu Sheng and several other princes were invited to Chang'an to feast; at the feast Liu Sheng wept and complained of the treatment of the feudal princes by centrally appointed officials, who made use of their role as monitors to constantly trump up charges against the princes. Impressed by this petition the Emperor explicitly ordered that the unfair scrutiny of the princes should stop, and Liu Sheng became one of the most renowned of the feudal rulers of his time.

He was known to indulge in alcohol and women, and is reputed to have had some 120 sons.

== Family ==
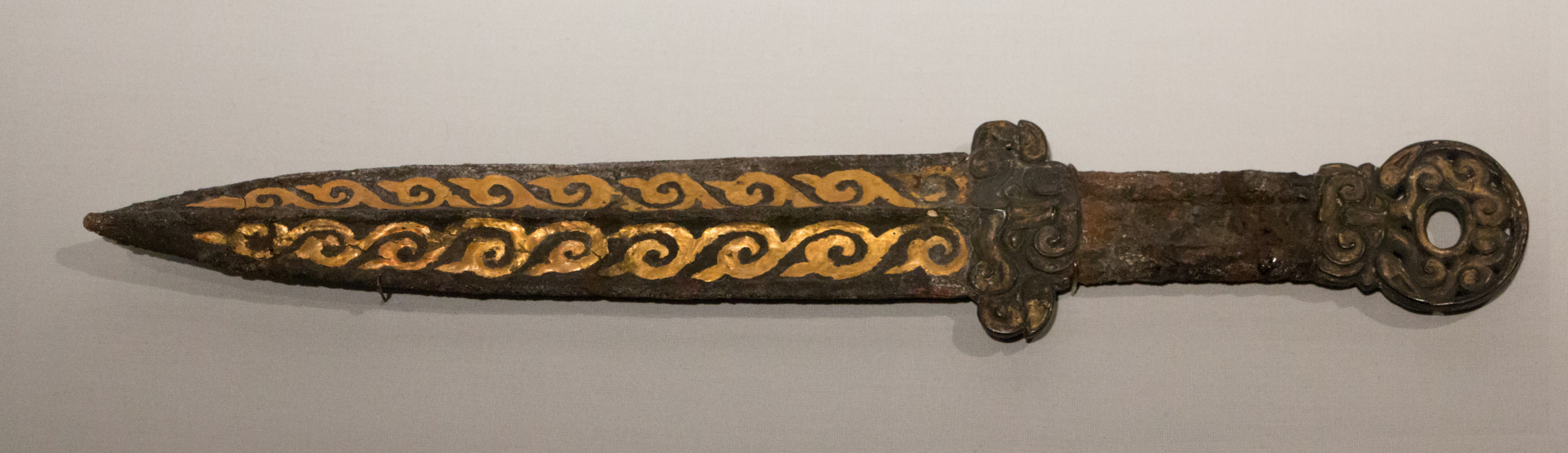
Bronze short sword with gold inlay and reliefs. Found in the tomb of Liu Sheng (d. 113 BC), Mancheng, Hebei, China. Chinese, Western Han, 112 BCE. Hebei Provincial Museum, Shijiahuang.

- Father: Emperor Jing of Han (9th son of)
- Mother: Consort Jia
- Wife: Dou Wan
- Children:
  - Liu Chang (劉昌), Prince Ai of Zhongshan (中山哀王)
  - Liu Zhen (劉貞), Marquis of Zhuolu Ting (涿鹿亭侯)
- Descendants:
  - Liu Bei (161–223)
  - Liu Kun (270–318)

== Mausoleum ==
Liu Sheng's tomb was discovered in 1968 by Wang Zhongshu at Mancheng in the Hebei Province, west of Beijing. He was buried along with his wife, Dou Wan. It was the first undisturbed Western Han tomb discovered. The two were buried in two caves inside a mountainside. Each cave contained two side rooms for storage, a rear chamber for the coffin, and a large central chamber with a tiled roof and wooden supports that has since collapsed. The tomb contained over 2,700 artifacts. In total, the following objects were excavated:

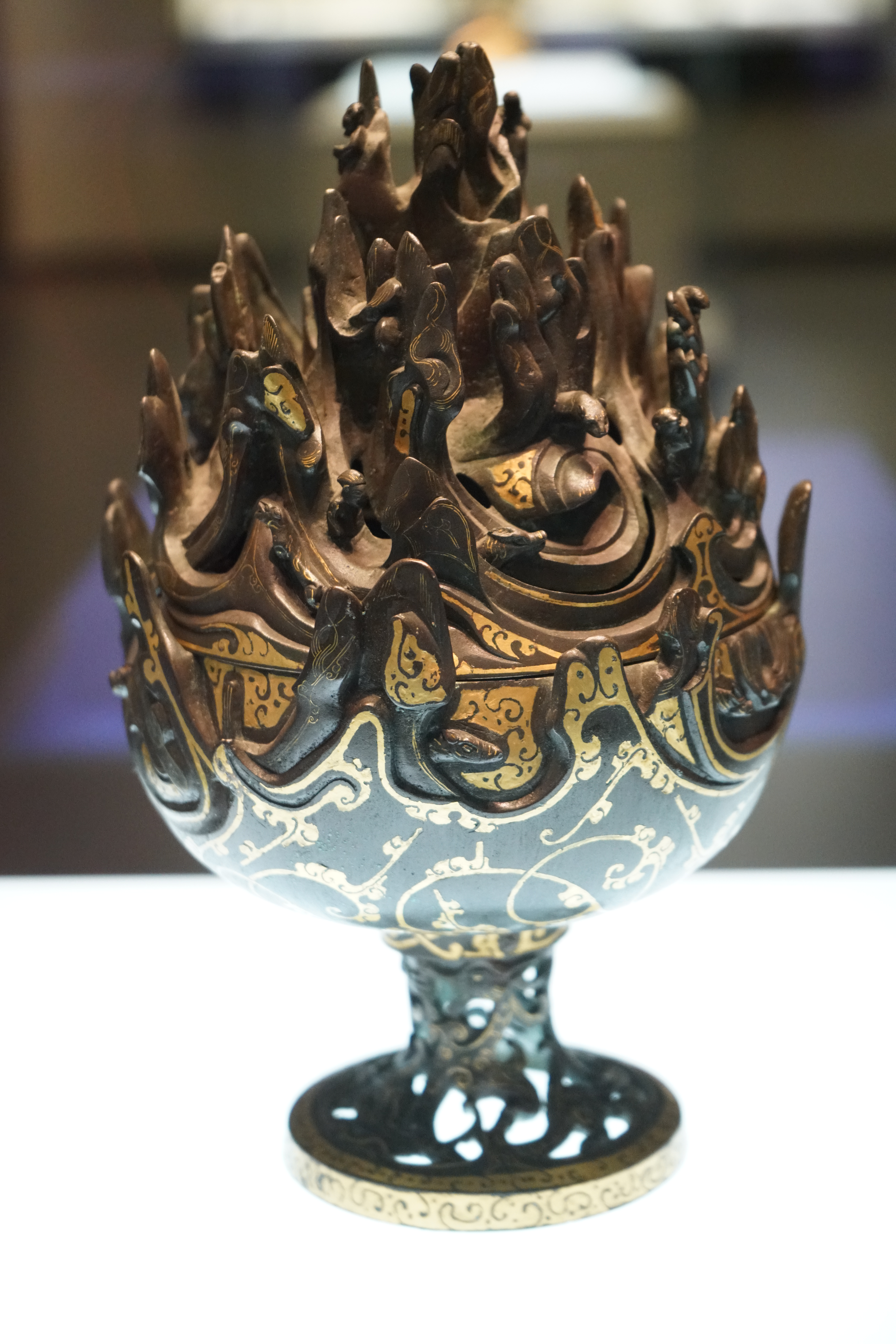
Bronze incense burner inlaid with gold; from the tomb of Liu Sheng, Prince of Zhongshan, at Hebei Mancheng, Western Han period, 2nd century BC

- 419 bronze artifacts
- 499 iron artifacts
- 21 gold artifacts
- 77 silver artifacts
- 78 jade artifacts
- 70 lacquered artifacts
- 6 chariots (south-facing side room)
- 571 pieces of pottery (north-facing side room)
- Silk fabric

The artifacts included gold and silver acupuncture needles, and decorative iron daggers. Two key items are the bronze incense burner, known as a boshanlu (Chinese: 博山爐) and Sheng's jade burial suit. The boshanlu resembles the sacred mountains of the Isles of the Immortals in the Eastern Sea. Han Daoists believed that the mountains were a path to everlasting life. It has a deep hemispherical bowl and an elegant base with classical Chinese intertwining dragons. There are wavy inlaid gold lines in the work, which likely represent the Eastern Sea. Projecting from the jagged peaks are relief figures of humans and animals. The boshan is an attribution to both Sheng's immense wealth and the skill of Han bronze casting. Both Sheng and his wife were buried with intricated jade suits that each contained over 2,000 pieces of jade.

== See also ==
- Shu Han family trees

Prince Jing of Zhongshan House of Liu Died: 113 BC
Chinese royalty
New title	Prince of Zhongshan; 154 BC – 113 BC	Succeeded by Liu Chang
