= Hill censer =

Chinese censer used for burning incense

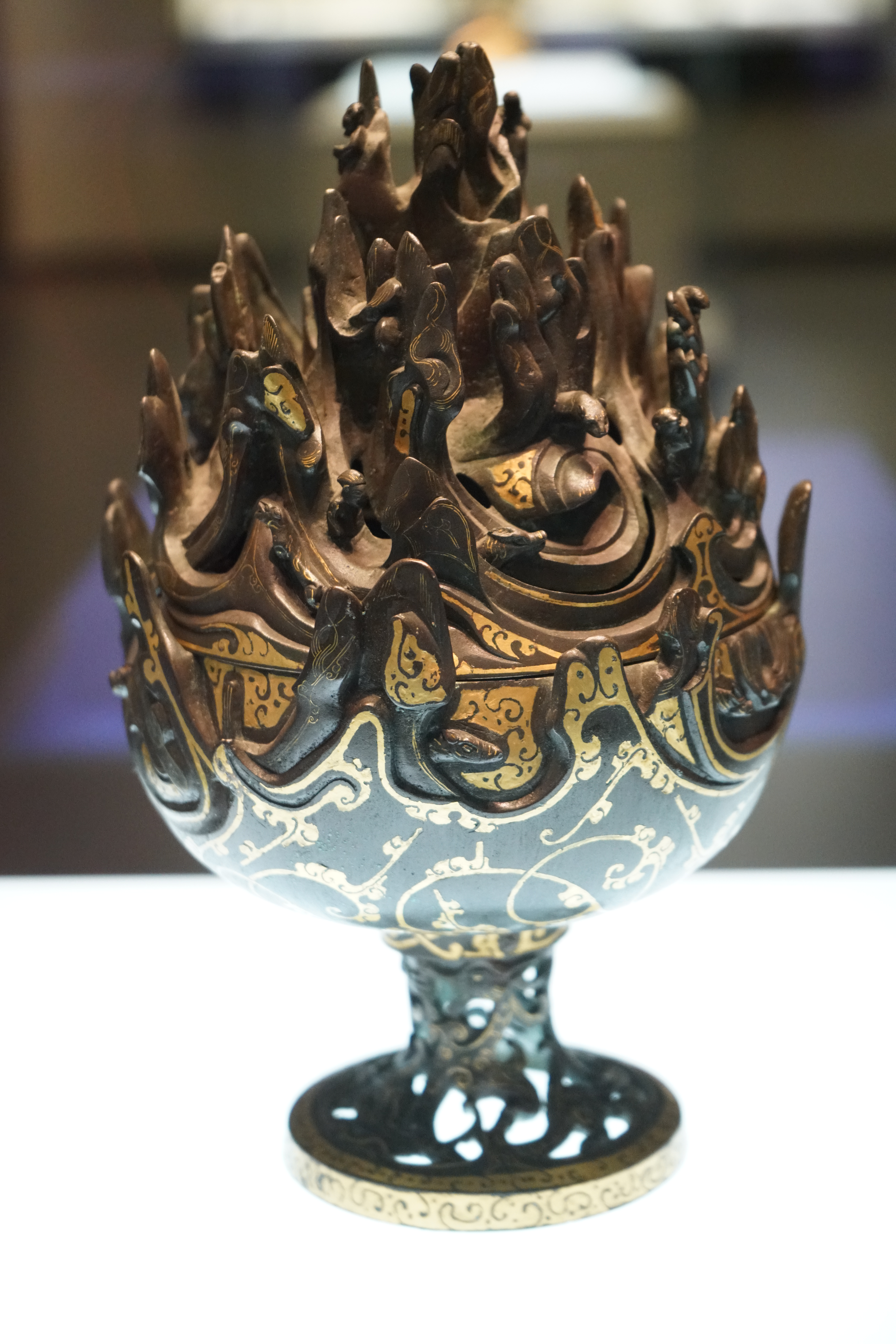
Bronze hill censer inlaid with gold; from the tomb of Liu Sheng, Prince of Zhongshan, at Hebei Mancheng, Western Han period, 2nd century BC

The hill censer or boshanlu (博山爐 "universal mountain censer" or boshan xianglu 博山香爐) is a type of Chinese censer used for burning incense. Hill censers first start appearing in tombs dating to the Western Han (202 BCE – 23 CE). Fashioned with a conical lid, the censers were designed to look like miniature mountains. The more elaborately crafted versions incorporate imagery of trees, wild animals, and humans among the rocky crags of the landscape. The scented smoked is vented through apertures in the lid, creating a scene reminiscent of clouds swirling around a mountain. The earliest vessels of this type were recovered from tombs of the imperial family, including Liu Sheng (d. 113 BCE), half-brother of the famed Emperor Wu of Han (157 – 87 BCE). Some excavated vessels lack vents and are thus believed to be examples of mingqi, or "spirit objects." These latter objects are often called "hill jars" by scholars.

Because hill censers first appeared when beliefs in sacred mountains inhabited by immortals were gaining in popularity, it is commonly thought these objects were crafted to represent these fantastic locations. Most frequently, hill censers are claimed to be depictions of Mount Penglai, the isle of the immortals located off the eastern coast of China. Some vessels have a tray as part of the foot support, further suggesting the censer represented a mountain island arising from the sea.

Some scholars believe hill censers functioned as visual supports for envisioning the mountainous abodes of the immortals. Medieval Chinese sources suggest the close association of hill censers with the imperial court, noting they were used as wedding gifts for princes. The Han dynasty craftsman and mechanical engineer, Ding Huan, is credited with creating a "nine-storied" hill censer carved with fantastic creatures that could move automatically.
