= Battle of Mount Qi =

Military conflict between Cao Wei and Shu Han (231)

Battle of Mount Qi (Battle of Lucheng)
- Part of Zhuge Liang's Northern Expeditions
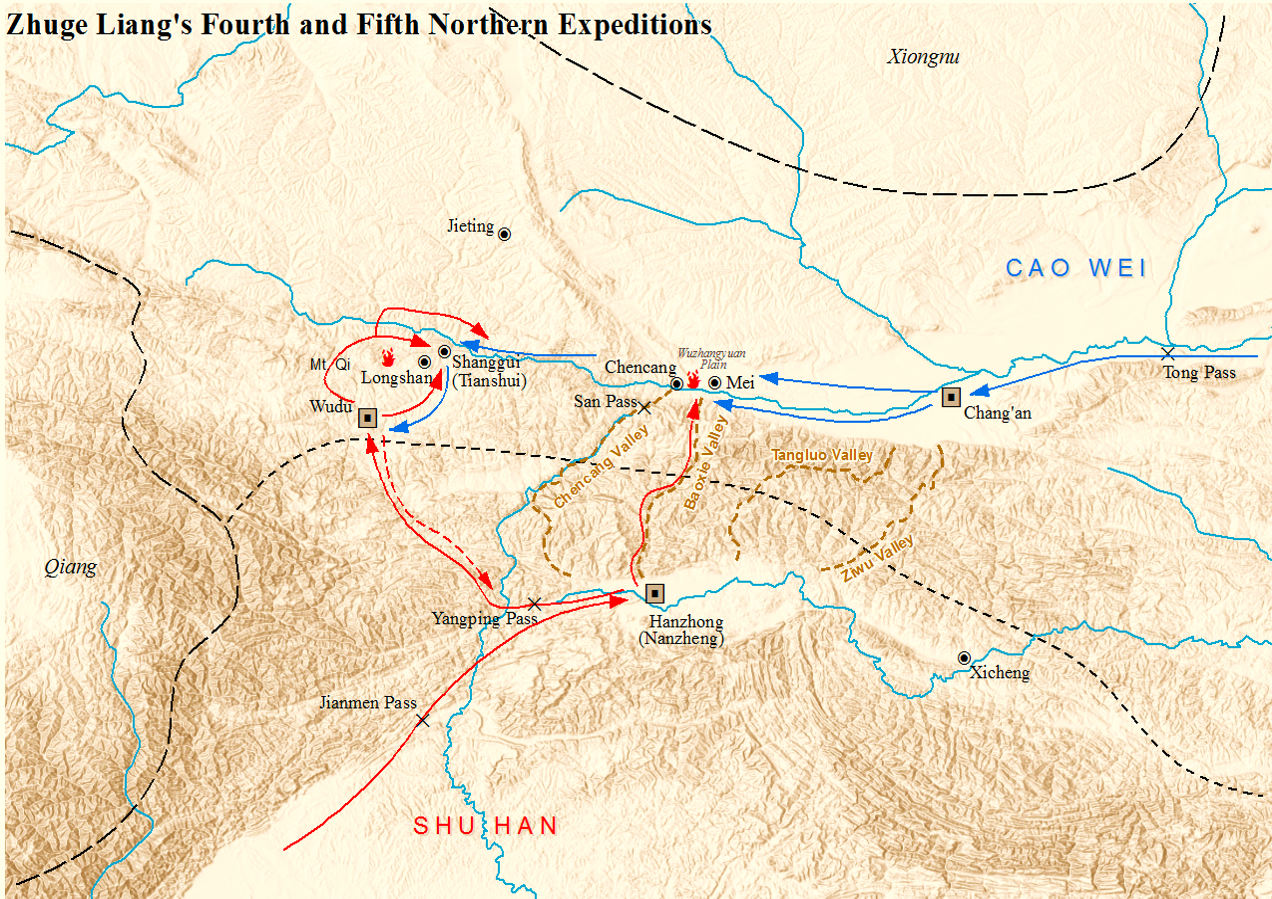
- Map showing the fourth and fifth Northern Expeditions
Date	March – August 231
Location	Southeastern Gansu, China (Mount Qi, Shanggui, and Lucheng)
Result	See aftermath

Belligerents
Cao Wei	Shu Han; Xianbei (Briefly)

Commanders and leaders
Sima Yi; Zhang He †; Fei Yao; Dai Ling; Guo Huai; Jia Si; Wei Ping	Zhuge Liang; Wang Ping; Wei Yan; Wu Ban; Gao Xiang; Kebineng

Strength
Unknown	Unknown

Casualties and losses
Heavy (According to Han Jin Chunqiu)	Unknown

The Battle of Mount Qi (祁山之戰), also known as the Battle of Lucheng (鹵城之戰), was a military conflict which took place around Mount Qi and Lucheng (in present-day southeastern Gansu) between the states of Cao Wei and Shu Han in 231 during the Three Kingdoms period of China. It was the fourth of Zhuge Liang's five Northern Expeditions.

During this campaign, the Shu regent Zhuge Liang achieved significant tactical victories, including a major defeat of the Wei commander Sima Yi at Lucheng and the killing of the veteran Wei general Zhang He in an ambush. However, the campaign ultimately resulted in a strategic Wei victory, as continuous heavy rainfall disrupted the Shu supply lines, forcing Zhuge Liang to retreat. The campaign is also notable for the first military use of the "Wooden ox" (木牛) by Shu forces to transport supplies, and the subsequent political downfall of the Shu minister Li Yan due to his logistical failures.

== Background ==
In 217, Liu Bei's strategist, Fa Zheng, proposed that Hanzhong Commandery could be used as an operational base to either attack the heartland of Wei or ingest the far-left-hook of Wei's Liang and Yong provinces. Following his failed attempts to capture Chang'an in 228 and Chencang in 229, Zhuge Liang spent time recuperating his forces and returned to Fa Zheng's blueprint. In early 231, Zhuge Liang assembled his troops to conquer the Longyou region, setting Mount Qi as his immediate target. Before marching, he sent emissaries to incite the Xianbei and Qiang peoples to create disturbances in Wei territory. He also introduced the newly invented "wooden oxen" (a type of modified wheelbarrow) to greatly improve the transportation of supplies through the rugged mountainous terrain. (Another invention, the "flowing horses", would not be introduced until his final expedition in 234.)

In February 231, Shu forces advanced towards Mount Qi. At the time, the overall Wei commander in the region, Cao Zhen, had fallen severely ill (and would die shortly after). Recognizing the gravity of the situation, the Wei emperor Cao Rui urgently recalled Sima Yi from Jing Province, appointing him as the overall commander of Wei's military forces in Yong and Liang provinces to repel the Shu invasion. The Wei generals Zhang He, Fei Yao, Dai Ling, and Guo Huai served as Sima Yi's subordinates.

== The Campaign ==
=== Standoff at Shanggui ===
The offensive began with Shu forces laying siege to Mount Qi, which was guarded by the Wei officers Jia Si and Wei Ping. Zhuge Liang also successfully convinced the Xianbei tribal chief, Kebineng, to support the Shu forces, rallying locals from Beidi Commandery to aid the invasion.

Sima Yi left Fei Yao and Dai Ling with 4,000 elite troops to protect Shanggui County (上邽縣; in present-day Tianshui) and set out with his main army westward to relieve the mountainous battlefield. Zhang He advised splitting forces to protect Yong and Mei counties as a rearguard, but Sima Yi refused, stating that dividing forces against a strong enemy was the reason the three armies of Chu were defeated by Qing Bu.

When Zhuge Liang heard of the Wei army's approach, he divided his forces, leaving a contingent to besiege Mount Qi while he led the main army to Shanggui to harvest the local early spring wheat to sustain his troops. Sima Yi bypassed Zhuge Liang's maneuvers by force-marching his troops overnight in light armor to reach Shanggui. Sima Yi commented that Zhuge Liang's hesitation to engage directly showed he feared the Wei pursuit. Not wanting to engage Sima Yi directly without a clear advantage, Zhuge Liang collected the harvested wheat and withdrew eastward after easily defeating Guo Huai and Fei Yao in a minor skirmish.

To resolve the resulting food shortage for the Wei army, Guo Huai asserted his influence over the local nomadic Qiang tribes, forcing them to produce food supplies. This allowed the Wei army to sustain itself without relying on long-distance shipments from the central government in Luoyang.

=== Battle of Lucheng ===
Following the standoff at Shanggui, Zhuge Liang retreated to the east of the Mount Qi ridges and set up a heavily fortified camp at Lucheng (鹵城). Using the local river as a natural barrier, the Shu army occupied the hills to the north and south, effectively taking complete control of the water passage.

Sima Yi pursued the Shu army to Lucheng but, upon seeing the strong Shu defenses, ordered his troops to dig in on the surrounding mountains and refused to engage. Sima Yi's reluctance to fight frustrated his subordinates. The besieged Wei officers at Mount Qi, Jia Si and Wei Ping, sent desperate messages mocking Sima Yi, stating, "My Lord, you fear Shu like a tiger, how can you not become the laughingstock of the world!"

Yielding to the immense pressure and criticism from his generals, Sima Yi finally launched a two-pronged offensive in May 231. He ordered Zhang He to attack the Shu southern camp defended by Wang Ping, while Sima Yi personally led the main force in a frontal assault against Zhuge Liang's center at Lucheng. In response, Zhuge Liang dispatched Wei Yan, Gao Xiang, and Wu Ban to intercept Sima Yi's main force. The Wei army suffered a catastrophic defeat. According to the Han Jin Chunqiu, the Shu forces killed 3,000 Wei soldiers and captured 5,000 suits of armor and 3,100 hornbeam crossbows. Defeated, Sima Yi retreated to his camps and reverted to a defensive stance.

=== Shu Retreat and Death of Zhang He ===
Despite the major tactical victory at Lucheng, Zhuge Liang could not press his advantage. By June, continuous heavy summer rains had severely damaged the mountain roads, halting Shu's supply lines. Li Yan, the Shu minister responsible for logistics in Hanzhong, sent a forged imperial edict claiming that the Emperor had ordered a retreat due to the imminent collapse of the army from starvation. Unaware of the deception at the time, Zhuge Liang ordered a full withdrawal from Mount Qi.

Seeing the Shu forces retreat and assuming they were exhausted and demoralized, Sima Yi ordered Zhang He to pursue them. According to the Weilüe, Zhang He strongly objected, citing classical military doctrine that "a retreating army returning home should not be pursued." However, Sima Yi ignored the advice and forced Zhang He to carry out the order. During the pursuit, the retreating Shu forces laid a deadly ambush at the narrow Mumen Trail (木門道). Shu crossbowmen positioned on high ground fired a barrage of arrows at the approaching Wei vanguard. Zhang He was struck in the right knee (or thigh) by a stray arrow and died, inflicting a significant blow to the Wei military leadership.

== Aftermath ==
When Zhuge Liang safely returned to Hanzhong, Li Yan's betrayal was brought to light. Feigning ignorance, Li Yan falsely claimed that the food supply was sufficient and asked Zhuge Liang why he had retreated. Simultaneously, Li Yan submitted a memorial to the Shu emperor Liu Shan, claiming that Zhuge Liang had "feigned retreat in order to lure the enemy."

Disgusted by this political maneuvering, Zhuge Liang presented Li Yan's original handwritten letters to the Emperor, exposing the contradictory lies. Unable to deny the evidence, Li Yan confessed to his misconduct. He was stripped of all his titles and offices and exiled to Zitong Commandery, though his family was allowed to keep their wealth and his son retained a government post.

Zhuge Liang spent the next three years recuperating the state's resources and completely overhauling his strategy—abandoning the Mount Qi route in favor of the Wuzhang Plains—before launching his final Northern Expedition in 234.

== Historiography ==
The events of the Battle of Mount Qi, particularly the engagement at Lucheng, are a subject of significant historiographical debate due to conflicting primary sources.

The Book of Jin (Jin Shu), the official history of the Jin dynasty compiled during the Tang dynasty, claims that Sima Yi successfully broke the Shu defenses at Lucheng, forcing Zhuge Liang to flee at night, and that Sima Yi's pursuit resulted in "tens of thousands" of Shu casualties. However, modern historians and classical scholars have widely rejected this account. The Book of Jin was written to legitimize the Sima clan (founders of the Jin dynasty) and frequently embellished Sima Yi's military record. Furthermore, its geographic descriptions of the battle contradict the established routes of the campaign.

Conversely, the Han Jin Chunqiu (written by Xi Zuochi in the 4th century) details the massive Shu victory led by Wei Yan, Gao Xiang, and Wu Ban. When the 11th-century historian Sima Guang compiled the monumental chronological history Zizhi Tongjian, he critically evaluated these conflicting texts. Sima Guang discarded the Book of Jin 's fabricated Wei victory, choosing instead to adopt the narrative of the Han Jin Chunqiu regarding Sima Yi's defeat and the 3,000 Wei casualties. However, Sima Guang also filtered out the Han Jin Chunqiu's claims of massive looted equipment (5,000 armors and 3,100 crossbows), likely viewing them as an exaggeration by Shu sympathizers.

Today, the consensus among historians (such as Sima Guang, and modern scholars) aligns with the synthesized view: Zhuge Liang achieved a clear tactical victory at Lucheng, but the campaign ended as a strategic success for Wei, as Sima Yi's Fabian strategy and the adverse weather successfully forced the Shu army to withdraw without permanent territorial gains.

Modern military historians, such as John Killigrew, view the 231 campaign as a fascinating paradox that highlights the stark contrast between Zhuge Liang's tactical brilliance and his lack of a flexible grand strategy.

In his detailed analysis of the campaign, Killigrew notes the perplexing aftermath of the Shu victory at Lucheng. Despite allegedly capturing thousands of weapons and inflicting a major defeat on Sima Yi, Zhuge Liang failed to press his advantage. Whether this was due to a lack of cavalry, fear of Wei ambushes, or extreme caution, the tactical victory ultimately stagnated into a months-long standoff at Shanggui, failing to yield any strategic territorial gains.

Furthermore, Killigrew interprets Li Yan's forged retreat order not merely as a desperate cover-up for logistical incompetence, but as a calculated political sabotage designed to overthrow Zhuge Liang's regime in Chengdu. As an old friend of Liu Bei representing the conservative Yi Province faction, Li Yan deeply opposed the alliance with Eastern Wu and the exhausting Northern Expeditions, preferring local rule over a divided China rather than the costly ideal of restoring the Han dynasty.

Despite the overall strategic failure of the expedition, Killigrew argues that Zhuge Liang's successful ambush of Zhang He at Mumen Trail cemented his reputation as a master tactician. By devastating the Wei cavalry with repeating crossbows in a narrow defile, Zhuge Liang effectively proved himself a worthy successor to the ancient strategist Sun Bin, who famously defeated Pang Juan via a similar ambush at the Battle of Maling in 341 BC.

Ultimately, however, the 231 campaign marked a definitive turning point in Wei's grand strategy. Acknowledging Zhuge Liang as a formidable adversary, Sima Yi realized that passive defense alone would not secure the Longyou region. In the aftermath of the campaign, Sima Yi implemented the tuntian (military agricultural colonies) system along the northern banks of the Wei River, mirroring the policies Cao Cao had once used against Eastern Wu. More significantly, in the winter of 231, Sima Yi initiated the construction of a massive 175km irrigation canal—restoring the ancient Zhengguo Canal—which watered over 34 square kilometers of farmland. These sweeping logistical reforms permanently resolved Wei's local supply issues, allowing Sima Yi to easily sustain a prolonged war of attrition and ultimately thwart Zhuge Liang's final expedition in 234.
