= Gao Xiang (Three Kingdoms) =

3rd-century Chinese Shu Han state general

- 高翔 / 高詳

General-in-Chief (大將軍)
- In office ?–?
- Monarch: Liu Shan

General of the Right (右將軍)
- In office 229 – 232
- Monarch: Liu Shan

Personal details
- Born: Unknown Jingzhou, Hubei
- Died: Unknown
- Occupation: General
- Peerage: Marquis of Xuan District (玄鄉侯)

Gao Xiang (fl. 217–240s) was a military general of the state of Shu Han in the Three Kingdoms period of China.

== Life ==
Gao Xiang served as General of the Right (右將軍). He followed Liu Bei on the Hanzhong Campaign between 217 and 219. Gao Xiang and Chen Shi camped at Yangping but were defeated by Cao Cao's general Xu Huang. In 228, Gao Xiang followed Zhuge Liang on the Northern Expeditions, serving as a subordinate of Ma Su, and they stationed at Liucheng. When Ma Su was defeated and Liucheng fell to the enemy General Guo Huai, Gao Xiang retreated. In 231, Gao Xiang was appointed Front Commander (前部督), leading an army together with Wei Yan and Wu Ban, defeating the enemy commander Sima Yi. They collected 3,000 enemy heads, 5,000 suits of armour, and 3,100 crossbows. When the supply official Li Yan failed in his mission, Gao Xiang and Zhuge Liang proposed that Li be relieved of his duties. Gao Xiang maintained General of the Right until at least 233, when Fu Kuang succeeded Gao, it is unknown if the later simply died or retired from the army. Considering Yang Xi's Ji Han Fuchen Zan which oddly doesn't feature the former General of the Right Gao, it may be reasoned to assume he died after 241 as a civilian.

== In Romance of the Three Kingdoms ==
Gao Xiang appears in Chapter 91 of the 14th-century historical novel Romance of the Three Kingdoms as a Center Army Right General, and he fills a minor role in the following chapters, being stationed near Liliu, he joins with Wei Yan and Wang Ping to retake Jieting. However they fail and Ma Su is executed by Zhuge Liang for the defeat.

Later Gao Xiang is involved in Zhuge Liang's Northern Expeditions. In chapter 102, he leads 500 men disguised as soldiers of Wei. Their purpose is to capture the wooden oxen that are part of the Wei convoy.

== See also ==
- Lists of people of the Three Kingdoms
