= Zhuge Liang's Northern Expeditions =

Shu Han military campaigns against Cao Wei (228-234)

- Part of the wars of the Three Kingdoms period
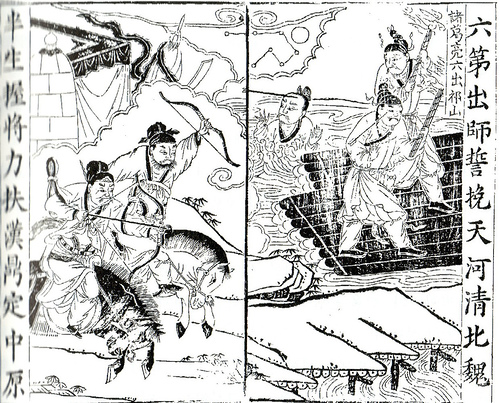
- An illustration of the Northern Expeditions from a Qing dynasty edition of the 14th-century historical novel Romance of the Three Kingdoms
Date	c. February 228 – October 234
Location	Gansu and Shaanxi, China
Result	See aftermath

Belligerents
Cao Wei	Shu Han; Qiang; Xianbei

Commanders and leaders
Cao Rui; Cao Zhen # Sima Yi; Zhang He †; Hao Zhao # Wang Shuang †; Guo Huai; Fei Yao; Dai Ling; Niu Jin; Jia Si; Wei Ping; Xin Pi; Xiahou Mao; Qin Lang	Liu Shan; Zhuge Liang # Wei Yan (executed); Zhao Yun # Deng Zhi; Ma Su (executed); Chen Shi; Wang Ping; Wu Yi; Wu Ban; Gao Xiang; Yang Yi; Jiang Wei; Kebineng

Zhuge Liang's Northern Expeditions
- Traditional Chinese: 諸葛亮北伐
- Simplified Chinese: 诸葛亮北伐
Transcriptions
Standard Mandarin
- Hanyu Pinyin: Zhūgě Liàng Běifá

Six campaigns from Mount Qi
- Chinese: 六出祁山
Transcriptions
Standard Mandarin
- Hanyu Pinyin: lìu chū Qíshān

Zhuge Liang's Northern Expeditions were a series of five military campaigns launched by the state of Shu Han against the rival state of Cao Wei from 228 to 234 during the Three Kingdoms period in China. All five expeditions were led by Zhuge Liang, the Imperial Chancellor and regent of Shu after the Kingdoms of Wei and Shu were established. Although they proved unsuccessful and ended up as a stalemate, the expeditions have become some of the best-known conflicts of the Three Kingdoms period and one of its few battles during which each side (Shu and Wei) fought with hundreds of thousands of troops, as opposed to other battles in which one side had a huge numerical advantage.

The expeditions are dramatised and romanticised in the 14th-century historical novel Romance of the Three Kingdoms, which includes the famous scene of the Empty Fort Strategy.

== Background ==
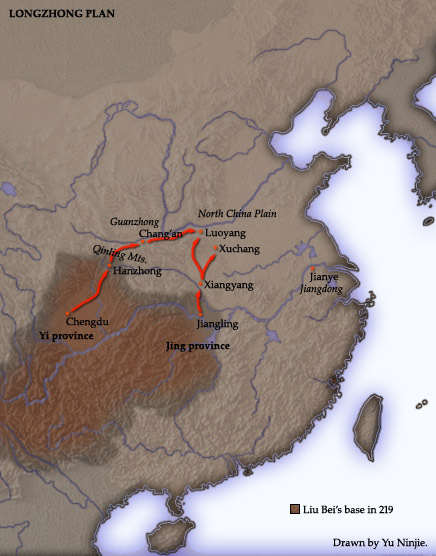
The Longzhong Plan

In 220, following the end of the Han dynasty, China was divided into three competing regimes: Cao Wei (or Wei), Shu Han (or Shu) and Eastern Wu (or Wu). Each of them was trying to unify the country under its rule.

In Shu, the strategic thinking behind the Northern Expeditions came from Zhuge Liang's Longzhong Plan, which he presented to the warlord Liu Bei in 207. In essence, the plan envisaged a tripartite division of China between the domains of the warlords Liu Bei, Cao Cao and Sun Quan. According to the plan, Liu Bei would seize control of Jing Province and Yi Province from their respective governors, Liu Biao and Liu Zhang, and establish a solid foothold in southern and western China. Liu Bei would then form an alliance with Sun Quan, who ruled eastern China, and wage war against Cao Cao, who controlled northern China and the political centre of the Han dynasty in central China. Liu Bei would then lead one army from Yi Province to attack Chang'an via the Qin Mountains and Wei River valley; one of Liu Bei's top generals would lead another army from Jing Province to attack Luoyang.

The first phase of the plan was completed in 214 when Liu Bei gained control of southern Jing Province and Yi Province. Between 217 and 219, Liu Bei launched a campaign to seize control of Hanzhong Commandery, the "northern gateway" into Yi Province, and succeeded in capturing it from Cao Cao's forces. In 219, Liu Bei's general Guan Yu, whom Liu Bei had left in charge of Jing Province, started the Battle of Fancheng against Cao Cao's forces. However, the Sun Quan–Liu Bei alliance ("Sun–Liu alliance"), which Zhuge Liang played an instrumental role in creating, broke down when Sun Quan sent his forces to attack and seize Liu Bei's territories in Jing Province while Guan Yu was away at the Battle of Fancheng. Guan Yu was captured and executed by Sun Quan's forces. Between 221 and 222, Liu Bei started the Battle of Xiaoting/Yiling against Sun Quan in an attempt to retake Jing Province, but failed and suffered a disastrous defeat. After Liu Bei died in 223, his son Liu Shan succeeded him as emperor of Shu, with Zhuge Liang serving as regent. The same year, Zhuge Liang made peace with Sun Quan's Eastern Wu regime and reestablished the Sun–Liu alliance (now the Wu–Shu alliance) against Wei, the regime established by Cao Cao's son and successor, Cao Pi.

In 227, Zhuge Liang ordered troops from throughout Shu to mobilise and assemble in Hanzhong Commandery in preparation for a large-scale military campaign against Wei. Before leaving, he wrote a memorial, called Chu Shi Biao (literally "memorial on the case to go to war"), and submitted it to Liu Shan. Among other things, the memorial contained Zhuge Liang's reasons for the campaign against Wei and his personal advice to Liu Shan on governance issues. After Liu Shan approved, Zhuge Liang ordered the Shu forces to garrison at Mianyang (沔陽; present-day Mian County, Shaanxi).

== Geography ==
Zhuge Liang's plan called for a march north from Hanzhong Commandery (what is now southern Shaanxi Province), the main population centre in northern Yi Province. In the 3rd century, Hanzhong Commandery was a sparsely-populated area surrounded by wild virgin forest. Its importance lay in its strategic placement in a long and fertile plain along the Han River, between two massive mountain ranges, the Qin Mountains in the north and the Micang Mountains in the south. It was the major administrative centre of the mountainous frontier district between the rich Sichuan Basin in the south and the Wei River valley in the north. The area also afforded access to the dry northwest and the Gansu panhandle.

Geographically, the rugged barrier of the Qin Mountains provided the greatest obstacle to Chang'an. The mountain range consists of a series of parallel ridges, all running slightly south of east, separated by a maze of ramifying valleys whose canyon walls often rise sheer above the valley streams. As a result of local dislocations from earthquakes, the topographical features are extremely complicated.

Access from the south was limited to a few mountain routes called "gallery roads," which crossed major passes and were remarkable for their engineering skill and ingenuity. The oldest of them was northwest of Hanzhong Commandery and crossed the San Pass. The Lianyun "Linked Cloud" Road was constructed there to take carriage traffic during the Qin dynasty, in the 3rd century BCE. Following the Jialing Valley, the route emerges in the north where the Wei River widens considerably near Chencang (in present-day Baoji, Shaanxi). Another important route was the Baoye route, which transverses the Yegu Pass and ends south of Mei County. A few more minor and difficult routes lay to the east, notably the Ziwu Valley, which leads directly to the south of Chang'an.

== Xincheng Rebellion ==
Meng Da, a former Shu general who defected to Wei in 220, served as the Administrator of Xincheng Commandery (新城郡; in present-day northwestern Hubei) near Shu's northeastern border. Zhuge Liang hated Meng Da for his capricious behaviour and worried that he would become a threat to Shu. Around 227, when he heard that Meng Da had a quarrel with his colleague Shen Yi (申儀), he sent spies to stir up greater suspicions between them and spread news that Meng Da was plotting a rebellion against Wei. Meng Da became fearful and decided to rebel. However, he was stuck in a dilemma after receiving a letter from the Wei general Sima Yi, who was stationed at Wancheng. In the meantime, Sima Yi quickly assembled an army, headed towards Xincheng, and reached there within eight days.

Wei's rival states, Shu and Wu, sent forces to support Meng Da but were defeated and driven back by Wei forces led by Sima Yi's subordinates. Sima Yi ordered his troops to surround Shangyong (上庸), Meng Da's base, and attack from eight directions. At the same time, he also successfully induced Meng Da's nephew Deng Xian (鄧賢) and subordinate Li Fu (李輔) to betray Meng Da. After 16 days of siege, Deng Xian and Li Fu opened Shangyong's gates and surrendered to Sima Yi. Meng Da was captured and executed. Sima Yi and his troops headed back to Wancheng after suppressing the rebellion. He then went to the Wei capital, Luoyang, to report to Wei emperor Cao Rui and then returned to Wancheng.

== First expedition ==
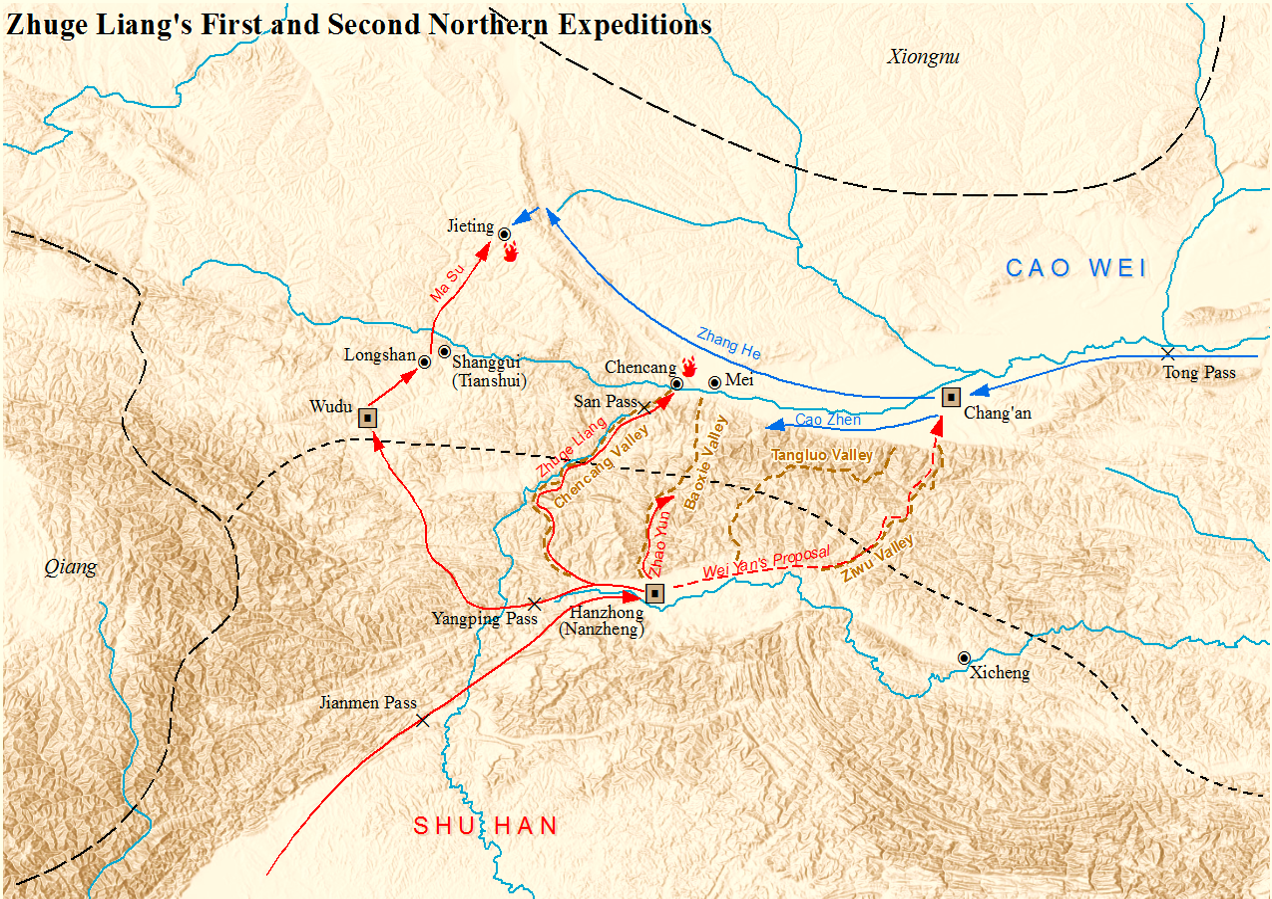
Map showing the first and second Northern Expeditions

In the spring of 228, Zhuge Liang launched the first Northern Expedition and led the Shu forces to Mount Qi (祁山; the mountainous regions around present-day Li County, Gansu). At the same time, he ordered Zhao Yun and Deng Zhi to lead a decoy force to Ji Valley (箕谷) and pretend to be ready to attack Mei County, so as to divert the Wei forces' attention away from Mount Qi. News of the Shu invasion sent shockwaves throughout the Guanzhong region. Three Wei-controlled commanderies – Nan'an (南安), Tianshui and Anding (安定) – defected to the Shu side.

In response to the Shu invasion, Cao Rui moved from Luoyang to Chang'an to oversee the defence and to provide backup. He ordered Zhang He to attack Zhuge Liang at Mount Qi, and Cao Zhen to attack Zhao Yun and Deng Zhi at Ji Valley. Zhao Yun and Deng Zhi lost the Battle of Ji Valley because their decoy force, composed of the weaker soldiers in the Shu army, were no match for Cao Zhen and his well-trained troops. (Zhuge Liang had reserved the better troops for the attack on Mount Qi.) In the meantime, Zhuge Liang sent Ma Su to lead the vanguard force to engage Zhang He at Jieting (街亭; located east of present-day Qin'an County, Gansu). Ma Su not only disobeyed Zhuge Liang's orders but also made the wrong moves, which resulted in the Shu vanguard suffering a disastrous defeat. After his victory at the Battle of Jieting, Zhang He seized the opportunity to attack and to recapture the three commanderies.

Upon learning of the Shu defeats at Ji Valley and Jieting, Zhuge Liang pulled back all his forces and retreated to Hanzhong. Although the first Northern Expedition was an overall failure, Zhuge Liang still made some small gains for Shu. The first gain was the capture of some Wei civilian families, which were then registered as Shu citizens and resettled in Hanzhong.

The second gain was the defection of Jiang Wei, a low-ranking Wei officer who later became a prominent Shu general. After returning to Hanzhong, Zhuge Liang executed Ma Su to appease public anger and then wrote a memorial to Liu Shan, taking full responsibility for the failure of the first Northern Expedition and requesting to be punished by demotion. Liu Shan approved and symbolically demoted Zhuge Liang from Imperial Chancellor (丞相) to General of the Right (右將軍) but allowed him to remain as acting Imperial Chancellor.

== Second expedition ==
In the winter of 228–229, Zhuge Liang launched the second Northern Expedition and led Shu forces to attack the Wei fortress at Chencang via San Pass. When he showed up at Chencang, he was surprised to see that it was much more heavily fortified and well defended than he had expected. That was because after the first Northern Expedition, the Wei general Cao Zhen had predicted that Shu forces would attack Chencang the next time and so he put Hao Zhao in charge of defending Chencang and strengthening its defenses.

Zhuge Liang ordered his troops to surround Chencang and sent Jin Xiang (靳詳), an old friend of Hao Zhao, to persuade Hao Zhao to surrender. Hao Zhao refused twice. Although Hao Zhao had only 1,000 men with him to defend Chencang, he successfully held his ground against the Shu forces. During the 20-day siege of Chencang, Zhuge Liang used an array of tactics to attack the fortress (siege ladders, battering rams, siege towers and tunnels), but Hao Zhao successfully countered each of them in turn. Upon learning that Wei reinforcements were approaching Chencang, Zhuge Liang immediately pulled back all his troops and returned to Hanzhong. A Wei officer, Wang Shuang, led his men to attack the retreating Shu forces, but was killed in an ambush.

== Third expedition ==
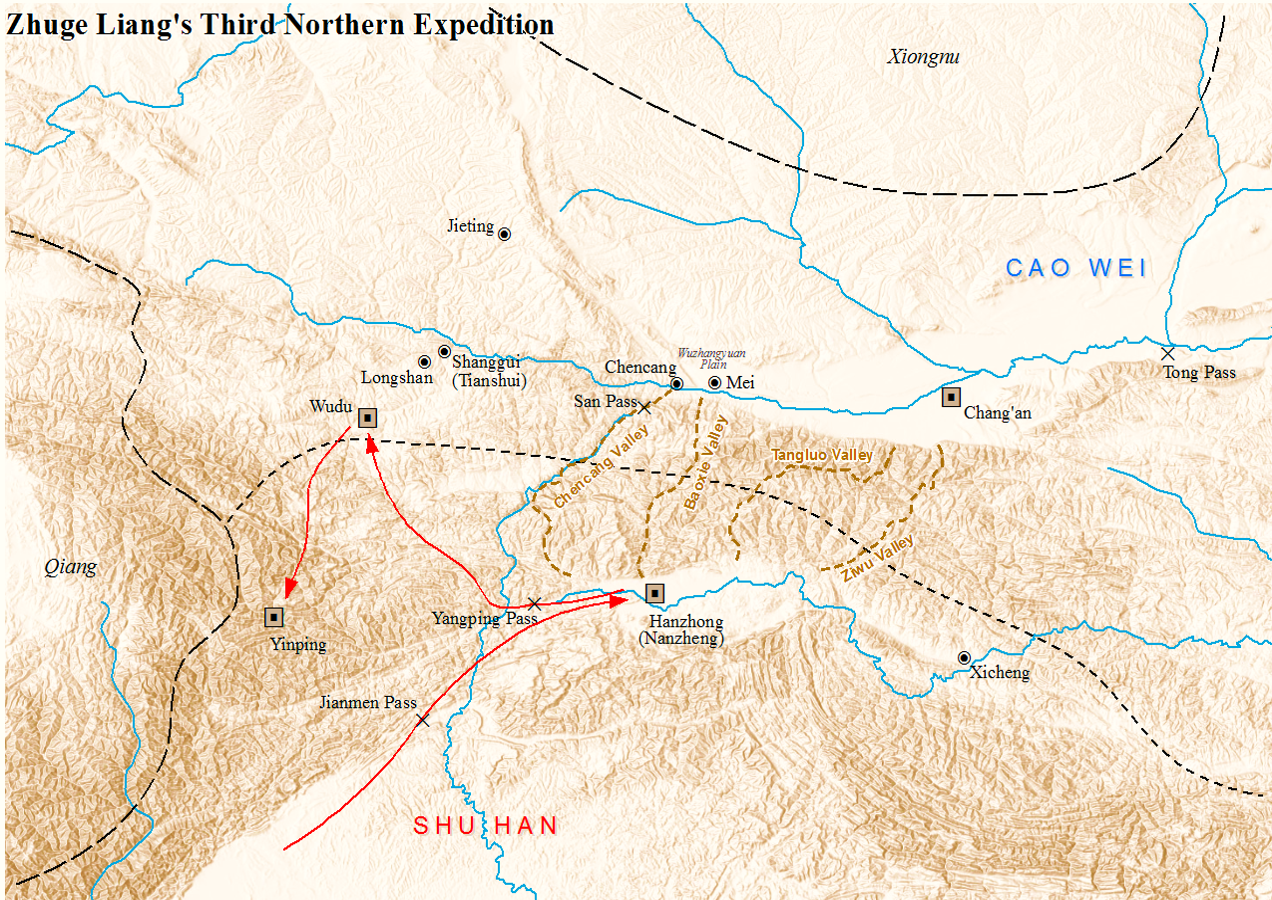
Map showing the Battle of Jianwei

In the spring of 229, Zhuge Liang launched the third Northern Expedition and ordered Chen Shi to lead Shu forces to attack the Wei-controlled Wudu (武都) and Yinping (陰平) commanderies. The Wei general Guo Huai led his troops to resist Chen Shi. He retreated after Zhuge Liang led a Shu army to Jianwei (建威; in present-day Longnan, Gansu). The Shu forces then conquered the Wudu and Yinping commanderies.

When Zhuge Liang returned from the campaign, Shu Emperor Liu Shan issued an imperial decree to congratulate him on his successes in defeating Wang Shuang during the second Northern Expedition, forcing Guo Huai to flee, winning back the trust of the local tribes, and capturing Wudu and Yinping commanderies during the third Northern Expedition. He also restored Zhuge Liang to the position of Imperial Chancellor (丞相).

== Ziwu Campaign ==
In August 230, Cao Zhen led an army from Chang'an to attack Shu via the Ziwu Valley (子午谷). At the same time, another Wei army led by Sima Yi, acting on Cao Rui's order, advanced towards Shu from Jing Province by sailing along the Han River. The rendezvous point for Cao Zhen and Sima Yi's armies was at Nanzheng County (南鄭縣; in present-day Hanzhong, Shaanxi). Other Wei armies also prepared to attack Shu from the Xie Valley (斜谷) or Wuwei Commandery.

When he heard of Wei recent movements, Zhuge Liang urged Li Yan to lead 20,000 troops to Hanzhong commandery to defend against the Wei invasion, which he reluctantly accepted after much persuasion. As Xiahou Ba led the vanguard of the expedition through the 330 km Ziwu Trail (子午道), he was identified by the local residents who reported his presence to the Shu forces. Xiahou Ba barely managed to retreat after reinforcements from the main army arrived.

Zhuge Liang also allowed Wei Yan to lead troops behind the enemy lines towards Yangxi (陽谿; southwest of present-day Wushan County, Gansu) to encourage the Qiang people to join Shu Han against Wei. Wei Yan greatly defeated Wei forces led by Guo Huai and Fei Yao. Following those events, the conflict became a prolonged stalemate with few skirmishes. After more than a month of slow progress and by fear of significant losses and waste of resources, more and more Wei officials sent memorials to end the campaign. The situation was wordened by the difficult topography and constant heavy rainy weather that lasted more than 30 days. Cao Rui had decided to abort the campaign and recalled the officers by October 230.

== Fourth expedition ==
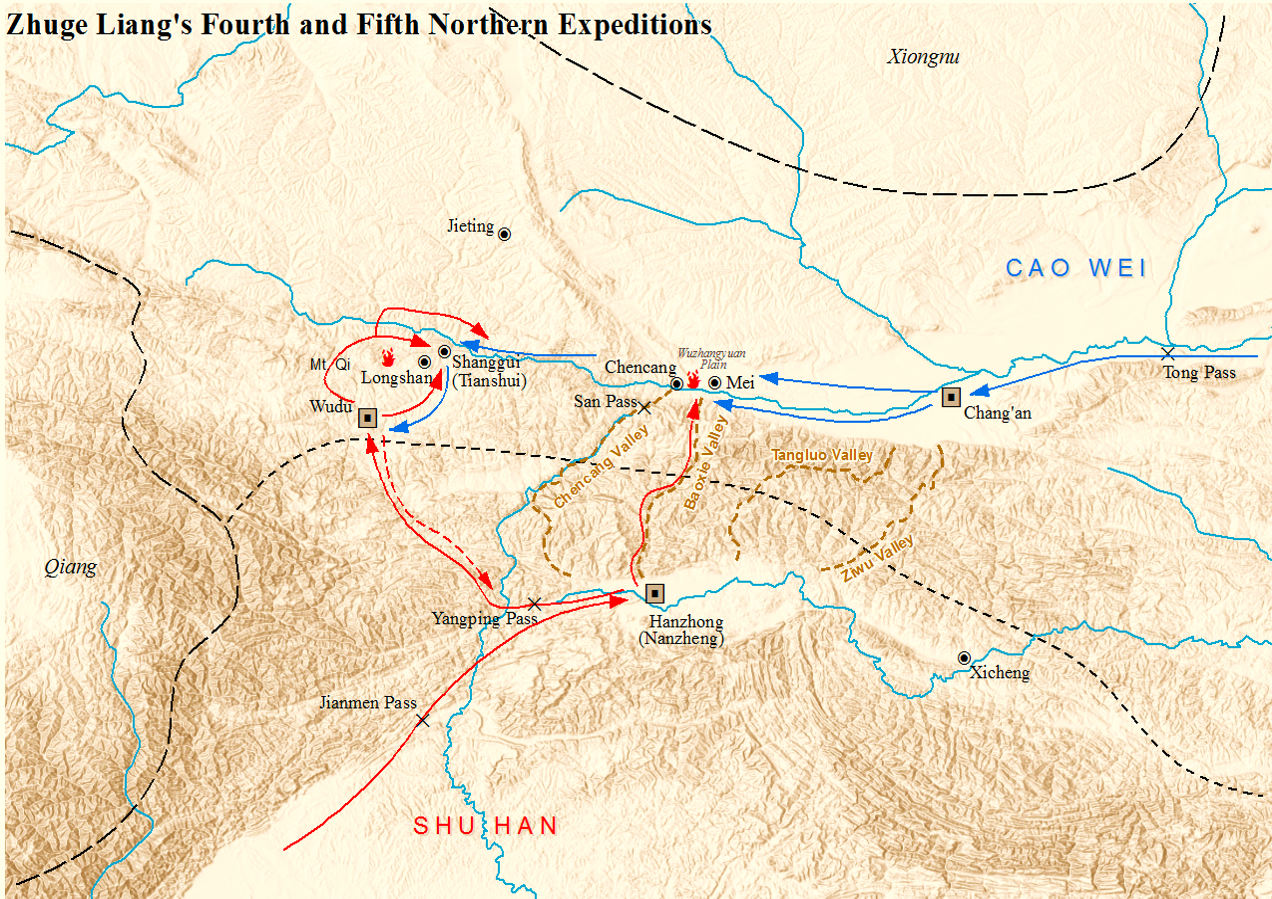
Map showing the Battle of Mount Qi and Battle of Wuzhang Plains

In 231, Zhuge Liang launched the fourth Northern Expedition and attacked Mount Qi again. He used the wooden ox, a mechanical device he invented, to transport food supplies to the frontline. The Shu forces attacked Tianshui Commandery and surrounded Mount Qi, which was defended by the Wei officers Jia Si (賈嗣) and Wei Ping (魏平). At Mount Qi, Zhuge Liang managed to convince Kebineng, a Xianbei tribal leader, to support Shu in the war against Wei. Kebineng went to Beidi Commandery and rallied the locals to support Shu.

At the time, as Cao Zhen, the Wei grand marshal, was ill, Wei Emperor Cao Rui ordered the general Sima Yi to move to Chang'an to supervise the Wei defenses in the Guanzhong region against the Shu invasion. After making preparations for battle, Sima Yi, with Zhang He, Fei Yao, Dai Ling (戴陵) and Guo Huai serving as his subordinates, led Wei forces to Yumi County (隃麋縣; east of present-day Qianyang County, Shaanxi) and stationed there. He then left Fei Yao and Dai Ling with 4,000 troops to guard Shanggui County (上邽縣; in present-day Tianshui, Gansu), while he led the others to Mount Qi to help Jia Si and Wei Ping.

When Zhuge Liang learnt of the Wei forces' approach, he split his forces into two groups. One group was to remain at Mount Qi while he led the other group to attack Shanggui County. He defeated Guo Huai, Fei Yao, and Dai Ling in battle and ordered his troops to collect the harvest in Shanggui County. In response, Sima Yi turned back from Mount Qi, headed to Shanggui County, and reached there within two days. By then, Zhuge Liang and his men had finished harvesting the wheat and were preparing to leave. Zhuge Liang encountered Sima Yi at Hanyang (漢陽) to the east of Shanggui County, but they did not engage in battle. Zhuge Liang ordered his troops to make use of the terrain and get into defensive positions; Sima Yi ordered his troops to get into formation and sent sending Niu Jin to lead a lightly-armed cavalry detachment to Mount Qi. The standoff ended when Zhuge Liang and the Shu forces retreated to Lucheng (鹵城), took control of the hills in the north and the south, and used the river as a natural barrier.

Although his subordinates repeatedly urged him to attack the enemy, Sima Yi was hesitant to do so after he saw the layout of the Shu camps in the hills. However, he eventually relented when Jia Si and Wei Ping mocked him and said that he would become a laughing stock if he refused to attack. Sima Yi then sent Zhang He to attack the Shu camp in the south, guarded by Wang Ping, while he led the others to attack Lucheng head-on. In response, Zhuge Liang ordered Wei Yan, Wu Ban and Gao Xiang to resist the enemy outside Lucheng, where the Wei forces suffered an unexpected and tremendous defeat: 3,000 soldiers were killed, and 5,000 suits of armour and 3,100 sets of hornbeam crossbows were seized by Shu forces. Even though the losses were heavy, Sima Yi still retained a sizeable army, which he led back to his camp.

Despite the victory, Zhuge Liang could not press his advantage with a major offensive because of the dwindling food supply. Adverse weather prevented Shu's logistics from delivering matériel on schedule. Li Yan, the Shu general responsible for overseeing the transportation of food supplies to the frontline, falsely claimed that Emperor Liu Shan had ordered a withdrawal. The Book of Jin claimed that Sima Yi launched an attack on Shu garrisons at this juncture and succeeded in capturing the Shu "covering camps." Zhuge Liang abandoned Lucheng and retreated under the cover of night, but Sima Yi pursued him and inflicted roughly 10,000 casualties on the Shu army. That account from the Book of Jin is disputed by historians and is not included in the outstanding chronological 11th-century historical text Zizhi Tongjian.

In any case, according to Records of the Three Kingdoms and Zizhi Tongjian, Zhuge Liang retreated to the Shu for lack of supply but had not been defeated. and the Wei forces pursued him. The pursuit did not go completely smoothly for Wei. Sima Yi ordered Zhang He to further pursue the enemy in an attempt to capitalise on their momentum. The Weilüe mentions that Zhang He refused to obey Sima Yi's order and argues that according to classical military doctrine, one should refrain from pursuing an enemy force retreating to its home territory. However, Sima Yi refused to listen and forced Zhang He to carry out the order. Indeed, Zhang He fell into an ambush at Mumen Trail (木門道; near present-day Qinzhou District, Tianshui, Gansu), where Zhuge Liang had ordered crossbowmen to hide on high ground and fire at approaching enemy forces when they entered a narrow defile. Zhang He died after a stray arrow hit him in the right knee. Unlike the Book of Jin records, Wei's army suffered a great deal of damage from pursuing Shu's retreating army.

== Fifth expedition ==
In the spring of 234, Zhuge Liang led more than 100,000 Shu troops out of Xie Valley (斜谷) and camped at the Wuzhang Plains on the south bank of the Wei River near Mei County. Aside from using the flowing horse to transport food supplies to the frontline, he implemented a tuntian plan by ordering his troops to grow crops alongside civilians at the south bank of the Wei River. He also forbade his troops from taking the civilians' crops.

In response to the Shu invasion, the Wei general Sima Yi led his forces and another 20,000 reinforcements to the Wuzhang Plains to engage the enemy. After an initial skirmish and a night raid on the Shu camp, Sima Yi received orders from the Wei emperor Cao Rui to hold his ground and refrain from engaging the Shu forces. The battle became a stalemate. Meanwhile, Zhuge Liang made several attempts to lure Sima Yi to attack him. On one occasion, he sent women's ornaments to Sima Yi to taunt him. An apparently-angry Sima Yi sought permission from Cao Rui to attack the enemy but was denied. Cao Rui even sent Xin Pi as his special representative to the frontline to ensure that Sima Yi followed orders and remained in camp. Zhuge Liang knew that Sima Yi was pretending to be angry because he wanted to show the Wei soldiers that he would not put up with Zhuge Liang's taunting and to ensure that his men were ready for battle.

During the stalemate, when Zhuge Liang sent a messenger to meet Sima Yi, Sima Yi asked the messenger about Zhuge Liang's daily routine and living conditions. The messenger said that Zhuge Liang consumed three to four sheng of grain a day and that he micromanaged almost everything except for trivial issues like punishments for minor offences. After hearing that, Sima Yi remarked, "How can Zhuge Kongming expect to last long? He's going to die soon."

The stalemate at the Wuzhang Plains lasted for over 100 days. Sometime between 11 September and 10 October 234, (Note: The Sanguozhi recorded that Zhuge Liang fell sick and died in the 8th lunar month of the 12th year of the Jianxing era in Liu Shan's reign. The month corresponds to 11 September to 10 October 234 in the Gregorian calendar.) Zhuge Liang became critically ill and died in camp. He was 54 (by East Asian age reckoning) at the time of his death.

When Sima Yi heard from civilians that Zhuge Liang had died from illness and that the Shu army had burnt down their camp and retreated, he led his troops in pursuit and caught up with them. The Shu forces, on Yang Yi and Jiang Wei's command, turned around and readied themselves for battle. Sima Yi pulled back his troops and retreated. Some days later, while he surveyed the remains of the Shu camp, Sima Yi remarked, "What a genius he was!" Based on his observations that the Shu army made a hasty retreat, he concluded that Zhuge Liang had indeed died and Sama Yi he led his troops in pursuit again. When he reached Chi'an (赤岸), he asked the civilians living there about Zhuge Liang and heard that there was a recent popular saying: "A dead Zhuge (Liang) scares away a living Zhongda (Note: "Zhongda" was Sima Yi's courtesy name.)" He laughed and said, "I can predict the thoughts of the living but I can't predict those of the dead."

== Results ==
Zhuge Liang's expeditions managed to inflict damage to the Wei army, killed several notable Wei commanders, and captured two small commanderies, but he failed to fulfil his strategic goal. After Zhuge Liang's death, his successor, Jiang Wan, changed policy to a defensive stance. Some people in Eastern Wu suspected that Shu Han wanted to renege on the Shu-Wu alliance, but Sun Quan commented that it was simply a sign of fatigue and exhaustion.

Yi Zhongtian listed three reasons for Zhuge Liang's failures:

1. Strong enemy: Cao Wei regime was robust and stable and had many talents (such as Sima Yi) and so could not be easily tackled by Shu Han.
2. Rough terrain: Cao Wei and Shu Han were separated by natural barriers, which put extremely heavy logistical burdens on the Shu Han army, including in providing adequate food supply. That was a key reason for the failure of the expeditions.
3. Zhuge Liang's own limitations: he was an excellent military organizer but not an outstanding military commander. He lacked the cleverness and decisiveness of a military general since he could properly lead an army but could not conduct complex and deceptive moves.

Yi Zhongtian argued that Zhuge Liang knew full well of all of the difficulties, including his own weaknesses, but still pressed on with the Northern Expeditions for three reasons:

1. Han restoration: Zhuge Liang was sincere and faithful to his goal of restoring the Han dynasty. He could change the tactics depending on the situation but never deviated from his ultimate goal.
2. Waging war for internal stability: The expeditions also served as a means to maintain the "state of war" and hence "martial rule" over Shu Han. Zhuge Liang wanted to use "martial rule" to tighten control over the local nobility and the privileged classes, which were not always happy with his legalist policies.
3. Pre-emptive strike: Being the weakest of the three kingdoms, Shu Han would be the first one to be preyed upon. The only solution was making pre-emptive strikes to intimidate the enemy and to enlarge Shu Han's own power base. The pre-emptive moves did not guarantee success but were better than doing nothing and withering away.

In other words, Shu Han's relentless attacks against stronger enemy were from Zhuge Liang's point of view actually necessary for its own survival. Zhuge Liang was praised for being far-sighted in recognising the issue.

== Timeline ==
Timeline of Zhuge Liang's Northern Expeditions
Approximate date range	Location	Event(s)
4 Apr – 2 May 227	Hanzhong, Shaanxi	Zhuge Liang moves to Hanzhong in preparation for the first expedition. He writes the Chu Shi Biao to Liu Shan.
4 Apr – 2 May 227	Luoyang, Henan	Sun Zi dissuades Cao Rui from sending Wei forces to attack Hanzhong.
2–30 July 227	Nanyang, Henan	Sima Yi is put in charge of military affairs in Jing and Yu provinces and stationed at Wancheng.
26 Dec 227 – 23 Mar 228	Northwestern Hubei	Xincheng Rebellion: Sima Yi suppresses the rebellion and executes Meng Da. He then goes to Luoyang to meet Cao Rui and returns to Wancheng after that.
23 Feb – 21 May 228	Western Shaanxi and southeastern Gansu	First Northern Expedition: Zhuge Liang rejects Wei Yan's Ziwu Valley Plan.; 8 April: Cao Rui moves from Luoyang to Chang'an.; Battle of Ji Valley: Cao Zhen defeats the Shu decoy force led by Zhao Yun and Deng Zhi.; Tianshui, Nan'an and Anding commanderies defect from Wei to Shu, but Wei forces recapture them later.; Battle of Jieting: Zhang He defeats Ma Su.; Zhuge Liang pulls back all Shu forces to Hanzhong. He executes Ma Su for defying orders and takes responsibility for the failure of the first expedition.; Cao Zhen puts Hao Zhao in charge of defending Chencang.
29 May 228	Xi'an, Shaanxi	Cao Rui departs Chang'an and returns to Luoyang.
17 Sep – 15 Oct 228	Shucheng County, Anhui	Battle of Shiting: Wu forces defeat Wei forces.
14 Dec 228 – 12 Jan 229	Hanzhong, Shaanxi	Zhuge Liang allegedly writes a second Chu Shi Biao to Liu Shan.
13 Jan – 10 Feb 229	Chencang District, Baoji, Shaanxi	Second Northern Expedition: Siege of Chencang: Hao Zhao successfully defends Chencang from Zhuge Liang's attacks.; Zhuge Liang retreats when his army runs out of supplies.
11 Feb – 10 May 229	Longnan, Gansu	Third Northern Expedition: Battle of Jianwei: Shu forces led by Chen Shi conquer Wudu and Yinping commanderies.; Zhuge Liang leads a Shu army to Jianwei as backup.; Wei forces under Guo Huai retreat.
28 Jul – 26 Aug 230	Luoyang, Henan	Ziwu Campaign: Cao Zhen convinces Cao Rui to launch a large-scale invasion of Shu. Cao Rui orders Sima Yi to lead an army from Jing Province and link up with Cao Zhen's army at Hanzhong.
27 Aug – 24 Sep 230	Hanzhong, Shaanxi	Zhuge Liang orders Li Yan to lead 20,000 troops to reinforce Hanzhong. The Wei invasion forces cannot pass through the Xie Valley as the gallery roads leading into Shu have been damaged by heavy rainfall over a period of more than 30 days.
27 Aug – 24 Oct 230	Wushan County, Gansu	Battle of Yangxi: Wei Yan defeats Guo Huai and Fei Yao in battle.
25 Sep – 24 Oct 230	Xuchang, Henan	Cao Rui orders the Wei invasion forces to abort their mission and return to base.
21 Mar – 15 Aug 231	Southeastern Gansu	Fourth Northern Expedition: Cao Zhen dies sometime between 20 Apr and 18 May.; Battle of Mount Qi: Zhuge Liang and Sima Yi engage in battle near Shanggui County and at Lucheng.; 17 July – 15 Aug: Zhuge Liang orders a retreat when his army runs out of supplies. Zhang He is killed in an ambush.
18 Mar – 10 Oct 234	Shaanxi	Fifth Northern Expedition: Battle of Wuzhang Plains: Zhuge Liang and Sima Yi reach a stalemate at the Wuzhang Plains.; Zhuge Liang dies in camp sometime between 11 Sep and 10 Oct.; The Shu army retreats after Zhuge Liang's death.

== In Romance of the Three Kingdoms ==
The Northern Expeditions in the novel "Romance of the Three Kingdoms" are heavily fictionalized and romanticized.

- Xincheng Rebellion#In Romance of the Three Kingdoms
- Empty Fort Strategy#Zhuge Liang

== See also ==
- Zhuge Liang's Southern Campaign
- Jiang Wei's Northern Expeditions
