= Wu Ban =

3rd century general of the Shu Han state

- 吳班

General of Agile Cavalry (驃騎將軍)
- In office 237 – 239
- Monarch: Liu Shan

General of the Rear (後將軍)
- In office before 231 – 235
- Monarch: Liu Shan

Personal details
- Born: Unknown
- Died: Unknown, probably between 241 and 243
- Relations: Empress Mu (relative); Wu Yi (relative)
- Parent: Wu Kuang (father)
- Occupation: Military general
- Courtesy name: Yuanxiong (元雄)
- Peerage: Marquis of Mianzhu (綿竹侯)

Wu Ban (fl. 221–239), courtesy name Yuanxiong, was a Chinese military general of the state of Shu Han in the Three Kingdoms period of China.

== Life ==
Wu Ban was a son of Wu Kuang (吳匡; fl.180-189), (Note: In He Jin's biography in Book of the Later Han, Wu Kuang was recorded as killing He Jin's step-brother He Miao.) an official who served under the general He Jin during the reign of Emperor Ling (r. 168–189) in the Eastern Han dynasty. Like his older relative Wu Yi, he served as a military general in the state of Shu Han during the Three Kingdoms period and held appointments/positions which were second to those held by Wu Yi. He was known for being bold and chivalrous. During the short reign of Liu Bei (r. 221–223), the founder and first emperor of Shu, Wu Ban served as a lingjun (領軍; a military commander).

Wu Ban participated in the Battle of Xiaoting of 221–222 against Shu's ally-turned-rival state, Eastern Wu. In the initial stages of the battle, the units led by Wu Ban and Feng Xi attacked and captured Wu positions at the Wu Gorge, which were guarded by the Wu officers Li Yi (李異) and Liu E (劉阿). As the Shu army advanced further, Liu Bei ordered Wu Ban and Chen Shi to lead the Shu navy to station at Yiling (夷陵; southeast of present-day Yichang, Hubei) in between the east and west banks of the Yangtze. After the Shu army passed through the Wu Gorge, Liu Bei instructed Wu Ban to lead a few thousand soldiers out of the mountainous terrain and set up camps on flat ground to provoke the Wu forces to attack them, but failed to lure the enemy out into a trap. The Shu forces ultimately lost the Battle of Xiaoting and retreated back to Shu.

Sometime before 231, Wu Ban held the appointment General of the Rear (後將軍) and was enfeoffed as the Marquis of Anle Village (安樂亭侯). Wu Ban participated at least to Zhuge Liang's fourth northern campaign against Wei where during the Battle of Mount Qi in 231 along with the officers Wei Yan and Gao Xiang they scored a major victory against Wei army led by Sima Yi, when they killed 3,000 Wei soldiers and seized 5,000 sets of armour and 3,100 crossbows. Sima Yi was forced to retreat back to his camp.

Later in 237, he succeeded his cousin Wu Yi as General of Agile Cavalry (驃騎將軍), granted imperial authority, and elevated from a village marquis to a county marquis under the title "Marquis of Mianzhu" (綿竹侯). Wu Ban maintained his appointment until at least 239; he is thought to have died by 243 where Deng Zhi is promoted to General of Agile Cavalry. Yang Xi's Ji Han Fuchen Zan (季汉辅臣赞), written in 241, did not mention Wu Ban, further suggesting that he died after 241. (Note: Yang Xi did not mention officials who were still alive when he wrote the work.)

== In Romance of the Three Kingdoms ==
In the 14th-century historical novel Romance of the Three Kingdoms, which romanticises the events before and during the Three Kingdoms period, Wu Ban is killed in battle during one of Zhuge Liang's military campaigns against Shu's rival state Wei. He is hit by arrows fired by archers under the command of the Wei officers Zhang Hu (張虎; Zhang Liao's son) and Yue Lin (樂綝; Yue Jin's son), falls into a river and dies. (Note: Historically, Wu Ban is listed as General of Chariots and Cavalry as late as 239, He likely died around that time of natural causes.)

== See also ==
- Lists of people of the Three Kingdoms
