= Ziwu Campaign =

Battle between Shu Han and Cao Wei in 230

- Part of the wars of the Three Kingdoms period
Date	August (Note: The campaign started in the 7th month of the 3rd year of the Taihe era of Cao Rui's reign. This month corresponds to 28 July to 26 August 230 in the Gregorian calendar.) – October 230 (Note: The troops retreated in the 9th month of the 3rd year of the Taihe era of Cao Rui's reign. This month corresponds to 25 September to 24 October 230 in the Gregorian calendar.)
Location	Qinling, Wushan County, Gansu, China
Result	Inconclusive, Cao Zhen retreat

Belligerents
Cao Wei	Shu Han

Commanders and leaders
Cao Zhen; Xiahou Ba; Guo Huai	Zhuge Liang; Li Yan; Wei Yan

Strength
Unknown number of Western troops	Unknown number in Hanzhong; 20 000 reinforcements under Li Yan

Casualties and losses
Unknown	Unknown

The Ziwu Campaign was a military counter offensive launched in 230 by the state of Cao Wei against his rival state Shu Han during the Three Kingdoms period of China. The campaign was initiated by Wei's Grand Marshal, Cao Zhen following the numerous Northern Expeditions and more recently the battle of Jianwei.

== Background ==
Following Zhuge Liang's return after the battle of Jianwei, Liu Shan issued an imperial decree to congratulate him on his recent success. He also restored Zhuge Liang to the position of Imperial Chancellor (丞相).

While in Wei, Cao Rui summoned Cao Zhen to the imperial capital Luoyang, where he promoted him to Grand Marshal (大司馬) for his successful defense of Wei territory against Shu Han's expeditions. During this meeting, Cao Zhen proposed that in response to Shu Han's attacks, Cao Wei should launch their own invasion. He also said that if the various generals proceeded along several routes simultaneously then there could be great chance of success. Chen Qun prevailed against such a plan on the basis, that when Cao Cao defeated Zhang Lu, the army already had difficulty transporting provisions. He further said that the terrain of Hanzhong makes it hard to advance and retreat, posing a great danger for the troops. (Note: Chen Qun said; "Before, when Cao Cao launched a campaign against Zhang Lu, he made sure to have a large quantity of both wheat and beans to keep the army well provisioned. Yet, before he defeated Zhang Lu, he ran into problems with provisions and could not find a solution. Moreover, the land is steep, it is difficult to advance or retreat, especially with transport. Our troops will certainly be intercepted and destroyed. If we use a large number of soldiers for this operation, it would be a waste. We must give this matter more consideration.") Cao Rui discussed the matter with Cao Zhen. Cao Zhen planned to use a different route to Ziwu, but Chen Qun again spoke against this plan. Cao Rui brought Chen Qun's arguments to Cao Zhen, but he was adamant in his decision and the campaign began.

== The Campaign ==
In August 230, Cao Zhen led an army from Chang'an to attack Shu via the Ziwu Valley (子午谷). At the same time, another Wei army led by Sima Yi, acting on Cao Rui's order, advanced towards Shu from Jing Province by sailing along the Han River. The rendezvous point for Cao Zhen and Sima Yi's armies was at Nanzheng County (南鄭縣; in present-day Hanzhong, Shaanxi). Other Wei armies also prepared to attack Shu from the Xie Valley (斜谷) or Wuwei Commandery.

When he heard of Wei's movements, Zhuge Liang urged Li Yan to lead 20,000 troops to Hanzhong Commandery to defend against the Wei invasion. However, Li Yan did not want to leave his home base and serve under Zhuge Liang, so he refused at first until Zhuge Liang appeased him by allowing his son, Li Feng, to replace him if he did come. Li Yan finally went to Hanzhong Commandery under persuasion and pressure from Zhuge Liang.

Lieutenant-General (偏将军) Xiahou Ba asked to be named as the vanguard of this expedition. He then led a force towards Hanzhong Commandery taking a route through the 330 km Ziwu Trail (子午道), and camped in a crooked gorge, near the Xingshi camp set up earlier by Shu general, Wei Yan. There, Xiahou Ba was spotted by the local residents, who reported his presence to the Shu forces led by Li Yan. Xiahou came was under heavy attack. As the main army of Cao Zhen had not caught up with the vanguard, Xiahou Ba was put into a dire situation, and were only to withdraw when reinforcements arrived.

Away from the main operation, Wei Yan led some troops towards Yangxi (陽谿; southwest of present-day Wushan County, Gansu) to encourage the Qiang people to join Shu Han against Wei, Wei did the same and sent Guo Huai along with Fei Yao to counter the uprising. When both armies met on the field, Wei Yan managed to inflict a heavy defeat to the Wei forces which allowed him to raise more troops and prevented Zhang He from joining the expedition.

Following those events, the conflict became a prolonged stalemate with few skirmishes. After more than a month of slow progress, more and more officials sent memorials to end the campaign, fearing significant losses and waste of resources. Among them were Hua Xin, (Note: Hua Xin's memorial is as follows: "A long time has already passed since the beginning of those conflicts and turmoil in this land. During this time, our great dynasty of Wei succeeded the Mandate of Heaven. Thanks to your Majesty's virtue, our country met providence similar to the previous rule of King Cheng and Kang of Zhou. You must cultivate your enlightened rule to others and succeed the Three Kings. There are the two rebel kingdoms but knowing of your ever-growing wisdom and the love that the people have for virtuous people, surely those from far away will join you with their children on their shoulders. One must use weapons only as a last resort and therefore armies must be used only on rare occasions. I hope that your Majesty would cultivate the country's economy and refrain from military actions. Moreover, an expedition carrying provisions over a thousand li, crossing many passes and advancing deep into the enemy territory, is bound to fail. I have heard that most of this year's harvest has been used to provision the army. A ruler should look at his people as his foundation and what matters more for them is food and clothing. If China does not suffer from disaster and people are joined in heart with their superiors, then it is a great chance for the Empire and only a matter of time before the surrender of the two rebels. As one of the foremost ministers of the State, I grow with each day even weaker. Soon my unworthy life shall end. I fear I might not see you again and therefore must wish to carry my duty as a servant to his sovereign. I hope you shall take notice of this.") Yang Fu (Note: Yang Fu's memorial is as follows: "In the past, King Wen of Zhou saw a red crow and couldn't eat for a whole day while King Wu of Zhou saw a white fish leap into his boat became fearful along with his subordinates. Those two events were considered as great auspicious signs, yet they were afraid. Now if one saw calamitous omens, how could he not feel a shiver? Wu and Shu are still not pacified yet we received many ominous omens. What your Majesty should do is look for wise advice to demonstrate yourself as a humble man. Show your tolerance to those far away while pacifying those nearby with your frugality. Our soldiers had barely started the campaign when there came a great calamity in the form of rain from the Heavens. For many days, they have suffered trapped in the mountains and defiles. The toil of the transport along with the burden of carrying provisions has already cost us so much. If we continue as such, our plan will fail. The ancients said "To advance when possible and withdraw when faced with difficulty is the way to move armies." To leave our soldiers trapped in valleys with no purpose, with nothing to conquer when they advance and no plan for retreat, is not the way for our army. In the past King Wu withdrew yet defeated Yin, with time he received his Mandate from Heaven. This year, the harvest is poor and the people are starving. You should issue an edict requisitioning less food and clothing, as well as all that is used to finance art and trinkets. In the past, Shao Xinchen said that in time of peace, one should limit his meals. Now that the army's supplies are lacking, this applies even more.") and Wang Su, (Note: Wang Su's memorial is as follows: "I have read that "If one transports food for a thousand li then the army will face hunger; if one must harvest wood before starting a fire, then the soldiers will not eat until the night." This applies for flat terrain, but we are moving through mountains and valleys where the roads are not flat. Now the toil of this expedition must be severe. Moreover, there have been incessant rains making the road slippery. The army cannot spread out and the provisions are far away and difficult to manage. This is a terrific task for his commander. I have heard that Cao Zhen, who started more than a month ago, has only made it halfway across Ziwu. The army must exhaust itself maintaining the road, while our enemy awaits us eagerly. This is against the teaching of strategy. In the past, King Wu made a campaign against Zhou but retreated soon after. More recently, both Cao Cao and Cao Pi did not cross the Jiang river when they faced Sun Quan. Are they not men of clairvoyance who accepted the limit decided by Heaven? If the people hear that you, having heard of the difficulties due to rain, let your soldiers rest, then you would make use of this opportunity. As they say when one is comforted after difficulties, he forgets death.") son of Wang Lang. The situation wasn't helped by the difficult topography and constant heavy rainy weather lasting more than 30 days. After this, Cao Rui decided to abort the campaign and recalled the officers by October 230.

== Aftermath ==
Although the campaign failed, Cao Zhen's timely retreat allowed Wei to limit their losses. The leading commander of the Wei forces, Cao Zhen, himself fell sick on the journey back to Luoyang and became bedridden in the subsequent months. He eventually died of illness in April or May 231. Cao Rui honoured him with the posthumous title "Marquis Yuan" (元侯).

For his success against Guo Huai and Fei Yao. the Shu government promoted Wei Yan to Vanguard Military Adviser (前軍師) and Senior General Who Attacks the West (征西大將軍), and elevated him from a village marquis to a county marquis under the title "Marquis of Nanzheng" (南鄭侯). Li Yan was not permitted to go back to the east. Instead, he became a subordinate of Zhuge Liang to help him during his future expeditions.

Cao Zhen's son, Cao Shuang, would be the leading commander of a similar expedition in 244 which resulted in the battle of Xingshi.
