= Chen Dao =

Early 3rd century Shu Han state general

- 陳到

Area Commander of Yong'an (永安都督)
- In office 226 – ?
- Monarch: Liu Shan
- Chancellor: Zhuge Liang

General Who Attacks the West (征西將軍)
- In office c. 223–?
- Monarch: Liu Shan
- Chancellor: Zhuge Liang

Army Protector (護軍)
- In office c. 223–?
- Monarch: Liu Shan
- Chancellor: Zhuge Liang

Personal details
- Born: Unknown Henan
- Died: Unknown
- Occupation: General
- Courtesy name: Shuzhi (叔至)
- Peerage: village marquis (亭侯)

Chen Dao (fl. 190s–230s), courtesy name Shuzhi, was a military general of the state of Shu Han in the Three Kingdoms period of China. He previously served under the warlord Liu Bei, the founding emperor of Shu Han, in the late Eastern Han dynasty.

== Historical sources on Chen Dao's life ==
Little is recorded about Chen Dao in history; unlike other notable persons of the late Eastern Han dynasty and Three Kingdoms period, he does not have a biography in the 3rd-century text Records of the Three Kingdoms (Sanguozhi), the authoritative source for that era in Chinese history. Information on him is scattered throughout the biographies of other persons in the Sanguozhi and other sources such as the Chronicles of Huayang (Huayang Guo Zhi) and Taiping Yulan.

== Life and career ==
Chen Dao was from Runan Commandery (汝南郡), which covers parts of present-day southern Henan. He started following the warlord Liu Bei sometime in the 190s when Liu Bei held the appointment of Governor of Yu Province.

Chen Dao served under the Shu Han state, founded by Liu Bei, during the Three Kingdoms period. In the early Jianxing era (223–237) of Liu Shan's reign, he was appointed General Who Attacks the West (征西將軍) and Army Protector (護軍), and awarded the title of a village marquis (亭侯). In 226, when the Shu regent Zhuge Liang was preparing to launch a military campaign against Wei (Shu's rival state), he reassigned the general Li Yan to Jiangzhou (江州; in present-day Chongqing) and put him in charge of logistics. Chen Dao was ordered to replace Li Yan at his previous post in Yong'an County (永安縣; present-day Fengjie County, Chongqing) near the border between Shu and its ally state Wu. Chen later died while serving at Yong'an, and Zong Yu succeeded him.

== Appraisal ==
Chen Shou, who wrote the Records of the Three Kingdoms (Sanguozhi) in the 3rd century, recorded that Chen Dao was second to the Shu general Zhao Yun in terms of fame and status, and that he exhibited loyalty and courage throughout his life.

Yang Xi, who wrote the Ji Han Fuchen Zan (季漢輔臣贊; pub. 241), a collection of praises of notable persons who served in the Shu Han state, appraised him as follows: "General Who Attacks the South (征南將軍) was kind and conscientious, General Who Attacks the West (征西將軍; Chen Dao) was loyal and diligent. Both were at the time elite warriors and ferocious generals among the illustrious."

Zhuge Liang, the Shu regent from 223 to 234, mentioned in a letter that his brother Zhuge Jin, commented that the soldiers guarding Baidicheng were not well trained. Zhuge Liang reassured him that the one in charge of military affairs was Chen Dao, who previously served as the leader of Liu Bei's bodyguards, the "White Feather Soldiers" (白毦兵), which was one of the most elite units in the Shu army at the time.

== In Romance of the Three Kingdoms ==
Chen Dao does not appear in the 14th-century historical novel Romance of the Three Kingdoms, which romanticises the historical figures and events before and during the Three Kingdoms period.

== See also ==
- Lists of people of the Three Kingdoms
