= Deng Zhi =

Shu Han official, diplomat and general (died 251)

- 鄧芝
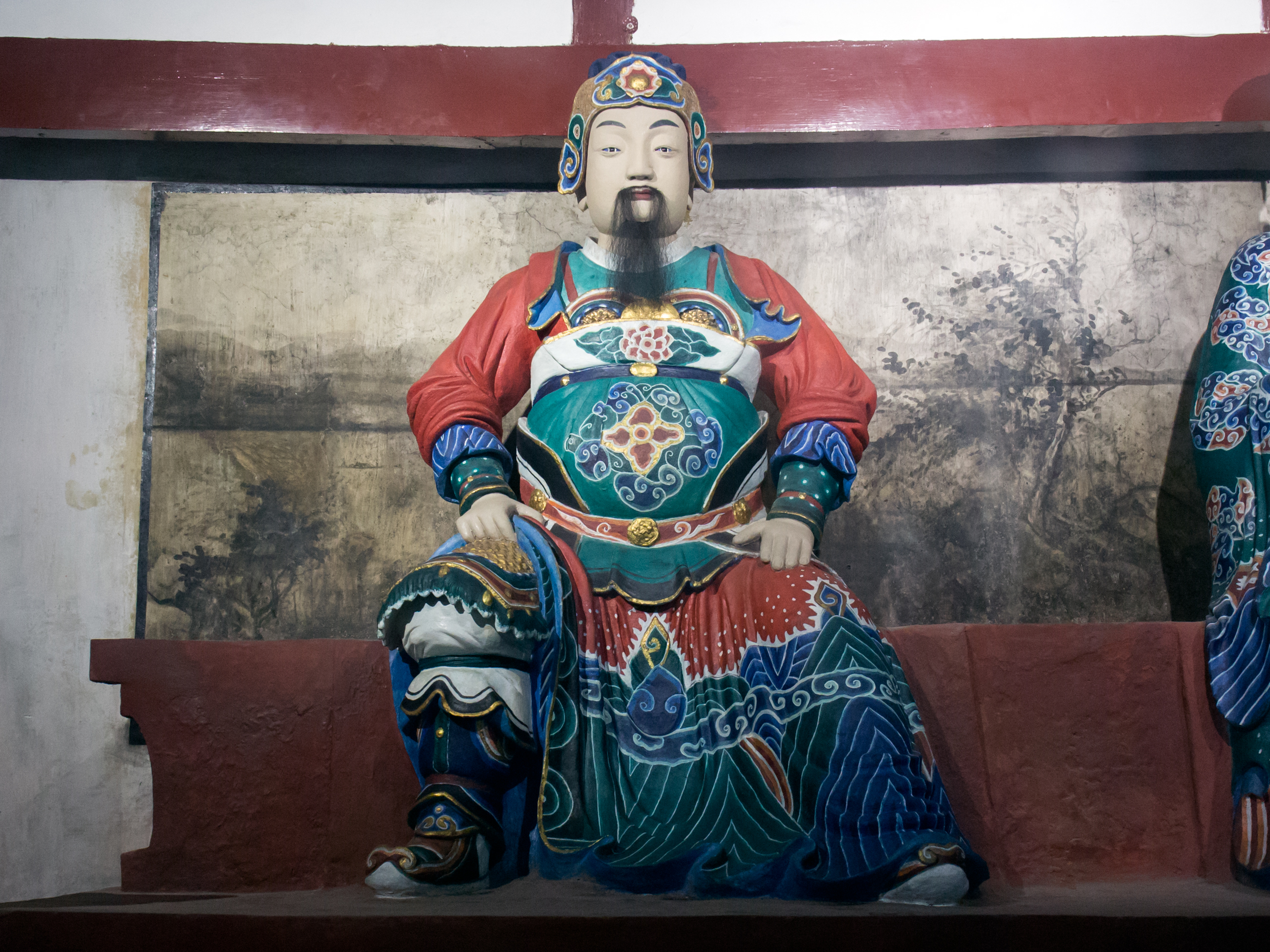
- Statue of Deng Zhi in a temple in Chengdu, Sichuan

General of Chariots and Cavalry (車騎將軍)
- In office 243 – 251
- Monarch: Liu Shan

Inspector of Yan Province (兗州刺史) (nominal)
- In office 234 – 243
- Monarch: Liu Shan

General of the Vanguard (前將軍)
- In office 234 – 243
- Monarch: Liu Shan

Vanguard Military Adviser (前軍師)
- In office 234 – 243
- Monarch: Liu Shan

General Who Spreads Martial Might (揚武將軍)
- In office 227 – 234
- Monarch: Liu Shan
- Chancellor: Zhuge Liang

Central Supervisor of the Army (中監軍)
- In office 227 – 234
- Monarch: Liu Shan
- Chancellor: Zhuge Liang

Master of Writing (尚書)
- In office c. 221 – 227
- Monarch: Liu Bei / Liu Shan
- Chancellor: Zhuge Liang

Administrator of Guanghan (廣漢太守)
- In office ? – c. 221

Prefect of Pi (County) (郫令)
- In office c. 214–?

Personal details
- Born: 178 Xinye County, Henan
- Died: 251 (aged 73)
- Resting place: Zitong County, Sichuan
- Relations: Deng Yu (ancestor)
- Children: Deng Liang
- Parent: Zheng Tiansheng (mother)
- Occupation: Official, diplomat, general
- Courtesy name: Bomiao (伯苗)
- Peerage: Marquis of Yangwu Village (陽武亭侯)

Deng Zhi (178 - 251), (Note: Rafe de Crespigny erroneously writes in A Biographical Dictionary of Later Han to the Three Kingdoms 23-220 AD that Deng Zhi died in the year 250.) courtesy name Bomiao, was a government official, diplomat and military general of the state of Shu Han during the Three Kingdoms period of China. A descendant of Deng Yu, Deng Zhi started his career in the late Eastern Han dynasty under the warlord Liu Bei as a low-level officer in Pi County. After Liu Bei discovered his talent, Deng Zhi steadily rose through the ranks to become a county prefect and later a commandery administrator and imperial secretary. In 223, the Shu regent Zhuge Liang sent him as Shu's envoy to meet Sun Quan, the ruler of Shu's ally state Wu, and reestablish the Wu–Shu alliance against their common rival state Wei. Deng Zhi succeeded in his mission and earned praise from Sun Quan for strengthening Wu–Shu ties. In 227, Deng Zhi became a military general and he participated in the first Shu invasion of Wei by leading a decoy force with Zhao Yun to distract the Wei general Cao Zhen. Although they lost the battle, Deng Zhi and Zhao Yun managed to rally their troops to put up a firm defence during their retreat and minimise their losses. Following Zhuge Liang's death in 234, Deng Zhi rose to higher general ranks and was stationed in present-day Chongqing for about 10 years before he was recalled back to the Shu capital Chengdu in his 70s to serve as General of Chariots and Cavalry. In 248, he suppressed a rebellion in Fuling (around present-day Pengshui County, Chongqing). He died in 251.

== Early life ==
Deng Zhi was born in the late Eastern Han dynasty in Xinye County (新野縣), Yiyang Commandery (義陽郡), which is present-day Xinye County, Henan. He was a descendant of Deng Yu, a general who served under Emperor Guangwu in the early Eastern Han dynasty.

Towards the end of the Eastern Han dynasty, Deng Zhi migrated to Yi Province (covering present-day Sichuan and Chongqing), where he did not receive as much recognition from the locals as he expected. He then decided to consult Zhang Yu, a low-ranking official in Yi Province who was also a famous fortune teller. Zhang Yu told him: "Sir, once you are above the age of 70, you will rise to the position of General-in-Chief and will receive a peerage as a marquis."

Deng Zhi later heard that Pang Xi, the Administrator of Baxi Commandery (巴西郡; around present-day Langzhong, Sichuan), had a reputation for hosting retainers, so he travelled there and became one of Pang Xi's retainers.

== Service under Liu Bei ==
In 214, after the warlord Liu Bei seized control of Yi Province from the provincial governor Liu Zhang, Deng Zhi was appointed as a low-level officer in charge of the granary in Pi County. One day, when Liu Bei visited Pi County, he spoke to Deng Zhi and discovered his talent. He was so impressed with Deng Zhi that he appointed Deng Zhi as the Prefect of Pi County, and later promoted him to the position of Administrator of Guanghan Commandery (廣漢郡; around present-day Guanghan, Sichuan).

After the fall of the Eastern Han dynasty in 220, Liu Bei declared himself emperor in May 221 and established the state of Shu to challenge the legitimacy of the state of Wei, which replaced the Eastern Han dynasty. Around this time, due to his good performance in office, Deng Zhi was reassigned from Guanghan Commandery to the Shu capital, Chengdu, to serve as a Master of Writing (尚書) in the imperial secretariat.

== As Shu's envoy to Wu ==
Between August 221 and October 222, Liu Bei went to war with his former ally Sun Quan, who broke their alliance in 219 by seizing Liu Bei's territories in southern Jing Province and executing Guan Yu, one of Liu Bei's top generals. However, he ended up suffering a disastrous defeat at the Battle of Xiaoting against Sun Quan's forces.

Before Liu Bei died in June 223, Sun Quan sought to make peace with him after the Battle of Xiaoting. In response, Liu Bei had sent Song Wei (宋瑋) and Fei Yi as his representatives to meet Sun Quan and agree on a truce. Following Liu Bei's death, Zhuge Liang, the Imperial Chancellor of Shu, became regent to Liu Bei's son and successor Liu Shan as Liu Shan was still underage at the time.

Just when Zhuge Liang feared that Sun Quan would break the truce and was unsure of what to do, Deng Zhi came to see him and told him: "His Majesty is still young and vulnerable. He has only recently ascended the throne. We should send an emissary to Wu to reestablish friendly ties with them." Zhuge Liang replied: "I have thought about this for a long time but I haven't found a suitable person to do this. Now I have found the right person." When Deng Zhi asked him who he had in mind, Zhuge Liang replied: "You, Sir." He then sent Deng Zhi as Shu's envoy to Wu to meet Sun Quan.

=== First trip to Wu ===
When Deng Zhi showed up in Wu, Sun Quan refused to meet him so he wrote a memorial to Sun Quan as follows: "I came here today not just for the sake of Shu, but also for the sake of Wu." Sun Quan then granted Deng Zhi an audience and told him: "I genuinely wish to form an alliance with Shu. However, I am worried that the ruler of Shu is still young and vulnerable, and that Shu is so small and weak that it can't save itself from being conquered by Wei. That's why I am having second thoughts."

Deng Zhi replied:

"The two states of Wu and Shu span four provinces. While Your Majesty is a dynastic hero, Zhuge Liang is also a hero of his time. Shu has high mountains as its natural defences while Wu has the rivers as natural barriers. If we combine our geographical advantages and form an alliance, we can conquer the Empire if we advance, and we can still maintain our positions if we recede. This is the natural course of things. If Your Majesty agrees to send your son as a hostage to Wei, they will eventually summon you to their imperial court or make your crown prince serve them. If you refuse, they will take it as treason and attack you. When that happens, Shu will follow the flow and take whatever it can from you. The lands in Jiangnan will then no longer belong to Your Majesty."

Sun Quan thought for a long time before replying: "Sir, you are right." He then decided to break ties with Wei, form an alliance with Shu, and then appointed Zhang Wen as his envoy to follow Deng Zhi back to Shu. Deng Zhi would also negotiate for the return of Zhang Yi who had been captured in a revolt by the locals in Nanzhong led by Yong Kai and sent to Wu.

=== Second trip to Wu ===
In Shu, after Zhang Wen reaffirmed the Wu–Shu alliance against Wei, Deng Zhi accompanied him on his journey home and paid another diplomatic visit to Wu. During this time, Sun Quan told Deng Zhi: "How wonderful it would be if two rulers can rule the Empire together in peacetime!" Deng Zhi replied:

"The sky cannot have two suns, and the land cannot have two kings. If, after Wu and Shu vanquish Wei, Your Majesty fails to understand who has the Mandate of Heaven, each ruler will extol his own virtues, their subjects will fulfil their loyalties to their respective rulers, and their warriors will ready themselves for battle. That will only be the beginning of war."

Sun Quan laughed and told Deng Zhi: "You are truly an honest person!"

Sun Quan later wrote a letter to Zhuge Liang as follows: "Ding Gong does it superficially while Yin Hua does it incompletely. Only Deng Zhi does well in bridging ties between our two states." Sun Quan's treatment of Deng Zhi compared with Fei Yi and was considered superior to another favoured envoy Zong Yu.

== First Shu invasion of Wei ==
In 227, Zhuge Liang ordered troops from throughout Shu to mobilise and assemble in Hanzhong Commandery in preparation for a large-scale military campaign against Shu's rival state, Wei. During this time, he commissioned Deng Zhi as General Who Spreads Martial Might (揚武將軍) and appointed him as Central Supervisor of the Army (中監軍).

In the spring of 228, Zhuge Liang ordered Zhao Yun and Deng Zhi to lead a detachment of troops to Ji Valley (箕谷) and pretend to attack Mei County (郿縣; southeast of present-day Fufeng County, Shaanxi) via Xie Valley (斜谷). Their mission was to distract and hold the Wei forces' attention, while Zhuge Liang led the Shu main army to attack Mount Qi (祁山; the mountainous regions around present-day Li County, Gansu). In response to the Shu invasion, the Wei emperor Cao Rui sent Zhang He to attack Zhuge Liang at Mount Qi, and Cao Zhen to attack Zhao Yun and Deng Zhi at Ji Valley.

Zhao Yun and Deng Zhi lost to Cao Zhen at the battle in Ji Valley because Zhuge Liang had given them command of the weaker soldiers while he led the better troops to attack Mount Qi. Nevertheless, Zhao Yun and Deng Zhi managed to rally their men into putting up a firm defence as they retreated, thus minimising their losses.

In the meantime, the Shu vanguard led by Ma Su suffered a disastrous defeat at Jieting (街亭; or Jie Village, located east of present-day Qin'an County, Gansu) against Wei forces under Zhang He's command. Zhang He then seized the opportunity to attack and recapture three Wei commanderies which defected to the Shu side. Upon learning of the Shu defeats at Ji Valley and Jieting, Zhuge Liang pulled back the Shu forces and retreated to Hanzhong Commandery by the late spring of 228. As a senior official, he would be listed by Zhuge Liang among the names calling for the sack of Li Yan for the attempted cover-up of his failure with supplies.

== Guarding Jiangzhou and pacifying Fuling ==
After Zhuge Liang's death in 234, Deng Zhi rose to the positions of Vanguard Military Adviser (前軍師) and General of the Vanguard (前將軍). He was also appointed as the nominal Inspector of Yan Province as Yan Province was not Shu territory. In addition, he was enfeoffed as a village marquis under the title "Marquis of Yangwu Village" (陽武亭侯). Shortly after, he was put in charge of guarding Jiangzhou (江州; present-day Chongqing) near the eastern border of Shu. His fame was compared to other border commanders Wang Ping and Ma Zhong.

When he was at Jiangzhou, Deng Zhi had several exchanges with the Wu emperor Sun Quan, who also sent him expensive gifts on numerous occasions.

In 243, Deng Zhi was promoted to General of Chariots and Cavalry (車騎將軍) and granted acting imperial authority.

In 248, the people in Fuling (涪陵; around present-day Pengshui County, Chongqing), a small vassal state under Shu, killed their Commandant and started a rebellion. In response, Deng Zhi led troops to attack the rebels, defeated them and executed their leaders. Peace was restored in Fuling.

== Death ==
Deng Zhi died in 251. at the age of 74 (by East Asian age reckoning). He was buried in a location about five li southwest of present-day Zitong County, Sichuan.

=== Encounter with the ape ===
The Chronicles of Huayang recorded that when Deng Zhi led Shu imperial forces to suppress the rebellion in Fuling in 248, he encountered a black ape in the hills. As he enjoyed firing crossbows, he decided to use the ape for target practice and fired a bolt at it. The ape pulled out the bolt from its wound and used twigs and leaves to nurse the wound. When Deng Zhi saw that, he said: "Alas! I have violated the laws of nature. I will die soon!"

Another account says that Deng Zhi saw a female ape carrying its child on a tree. He fired a crossbow bolt at them and hit the female ape. The baby ape pulled out the bolt from its mother's wound and used twigs and leaves to nurse the wound. After seeing that, Deng Zhi sighed, threw his crossbow into the water, and knew that he was going to die soon.

== Family ==
Deng Zhi's mother was Zheng Tiansheng (鄭天生).

Deng Zhi's son, Deng Liang (鄧良), inherited his father's peerage and became the next Marquis of Yangwu Village (陽武亭侯). He served as an official in the selection bureau of the imperial secretariat during the Jingyao era (258–263) of Liu Shan's reign and was one of the officers sent to surrender to Deng Ai. After the fall of Shu, he served under the Jin dynasty as the Administrator of Guanghan Commandery (廣漢郡; around present-day Guanghan, Sichuan).

== Appraisal ==
Throughout his career of over 20 years as a general, Deng Zhi was known for showing wisdom and fairness in giving out rewards and punishments, as well as for treating his soldiers very well. He also led a frugal and simple life as he relied solely on his official salary and government-issued items for his basic needs. When he became General of the Vanguard, his salary increased substantially and even far greater as General of Chariots and Cavalry but this increase of income was mostly used to pay off debts and support his family and relatives. As he owned no private property throughout his life, his family often struggled to make ends meet and they had no excess wealth at the time of his death.

Deng Zhi was also known for being firm and candid, and direct when he expressed his thoughts and feelings. As a result, he neither got along well with the scholar-elite and literati nor gained much respect and prestige among his contemporaries. Jiang Wei was one of the few who regarded Deng Zhi highly.

Despite his positive traits, Deng Zhi was known for being arrogant and condescending. Many of his colleagues, including his superior Fei Yi, tended to give in to him. However, there was one Zong Yu who stood up to Deng Zhi. In 243, when Deng Zhi returned to the Shu capital Chengdu from his previous post at Jiangzhou to serve as General of Chariots and Cavalry, he met Zong Yu and asked him: "According to the rules of propriety, a man should no longer serve in the military once he reaches 60. Why do you still want to receive command of troops at this age?" Zong Yu rebuked him: "You are already 70, but you haven't relinquished your command of troops. So why can't I receive command of troops when I am 60?"

== In Romance of the Three Kingdoms ==
Deng Zhi is a minor character in the 14th-century historical novel Romance of the Three Kingdoms, which romanticises the historical events before and during the Three Kingdoms period of China. His first trip to Wu as Shu's envoy in the year 223 is dramatised and exaggerated in Chapter 86.

When Deng Zhi shows up in Wu, Zhang Zhao suggests to the Wu king Sun Quan to intimidate Deng Zhi and boil him alive (in the same way the King of Qi executed Li Yiji) if he tries to lobby them to make peace with Shu. Sun Quan heeds Zhang Zhao's suggestion by setting up a large cauldron filled with boiling oil outside the meeting hall, and ordering heavily armed guards to line the path leading to the hall.

Upon his arrival outside the hall, Deng Zhi sees the display and understands Sun Quan's intentions. He shows no sign of fear and calmly walks into the hall, smiling at the heavily armed guards who glare at him. After entering the hall, he does not kneel when he pays respect to Sun Quan, who shouts at him: "Why are you not kneeling?" Deng Zhi confidently replies: "An emissary of a great kingdom does not bow to the lord of a lesser state." An enraged Sun Quan says: "You don't know your place. Are you trying to use that tongue of yours to convince me in the same way Li Yiji tried to lobby the King of Qi? You can throw yourself into that cauldron now!" Deng Zhi laughs and replies: "People all say Eastern Wu has many talents. Who would expect that they fear a scholar?" An angry Sun Quan asks: "Why should I be afraid of a common man?" Deng Zhi replies: "If you don't fear Deng Bomiao, then why are you worried that I am here to lobby you?" Sun Quan asks: "You are here on Zhuge Liang's behalf to lobby me to reject Wei and join Shu. Is that true?" Deng Zhi replies: "I am but a scholar from Shu. I came here specially in the interests of Wu, yet you try to intimidate me with heavily armed guards and an oil cauldron. Doesn't that show how narrow-minded and intolerant you are?"

Sun Quan feels anxious and ashamed after hearing Deng Zhi's words, so he orders the guards to leave and offers Deng Zhi a seat in the hall. He then asks Deng Zhi: "Sir, can you tell me what are the interests of Wu and Wei?" Deng Zhi asks him back: "Your Majesty wants to make peace with Shu or Wei?" Sun Quan replies: "I wish to make peace with Shu, but I am afraid that the ruler of Shu is too young and inexperienced that he cannot ensure Shu's survival." Deng Zhi says: "While Your Majesty is a dynastic hero, Zhuge Liang is also a hero of his time. Shu has high mountains as its natural defences while Wu has the rivers as natural barriers. If we combine our geographical advantages and form an alliance, we can conquer the Empire if we advance, and we can still maintain our positions if we recede. This is the natural course of things. If Your Majesty agrees to send your son as a hostage to Wei, they will eventually summon you to their imperial court or make your crown prince serve them. If you refuse, they will take it as treason and attack you. When that happens, Shu will follow the flow and take whatever it can from you. The lands in Jiangnan will then no longer belong to Your Majesty. If Your Majesty disagrees with what I have just said, then I will die immediately in front of Your Majesty to rid myself of being labelled a lobbyist."

After finishing his speech, Deng Zhi leaves his seat, dashes out of the hall and prepares to throw himself into the cauldron. Sun Quan immediately stops him, invites him back to the hall, and treats him like an honoured guest. He then tells Deng Zhi: "Sir, what you just said is in line with my thoughts. I desire to make peace and ally with Shu. Sir, are you willing to help me?" Deng Zhi replies: "Just now Your Majesty wanted to boil me alive. Now Your Majesty wants me to help you with diplomacy. If Your Majesty can't make up your mind, how can you gain people's trust?" Sun Quan replied: "I have made up my mind. Sir, you can be sure about that."

Sun Quan then sends Zhang Wen as his envoy to accompany Deng Zhi back to Shu to meet Zhuge Liang and reestablish the Wu–Shu alliance against Wei.

== See also ==
- Lists of people of the Three Kingdoms
