= Battle of Jianwei =

Military conflict between Cao Wei and Shu Han (229)

- Part of the third of Zhuge Liang's Northern Expeditions
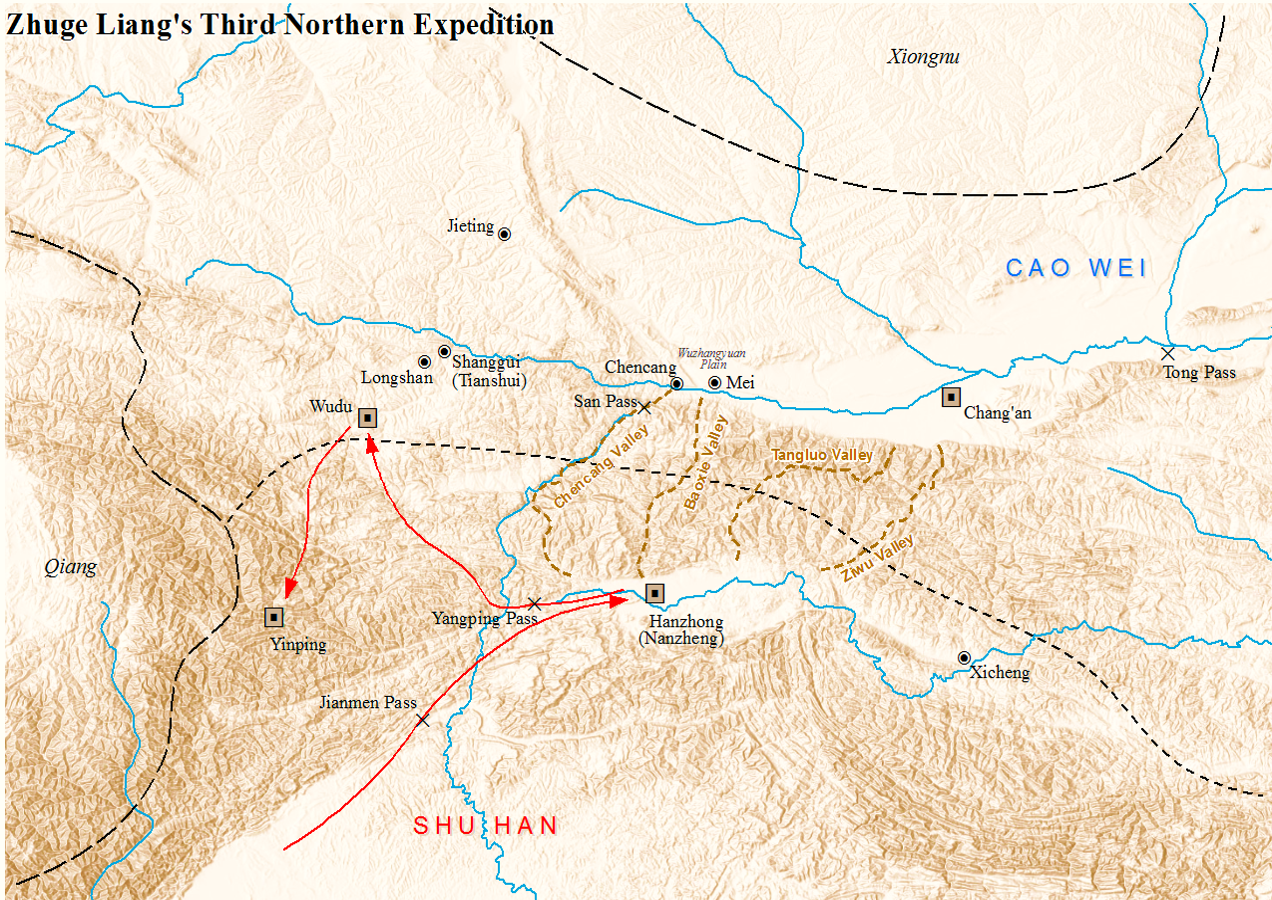
- The third of Zhuge Liang's northern expeditions
Date	February – May 229
Location	Longnan, Gansu, China
Result	Shu Han victory
Territorial changes	Wudu and Yinping commanderies captured by Shu

Belligerents
Cao Wei	Shu Han

Commanders and leaders
Guo Huai	Zhuge Liang; Chen Shi

Battle of Jianwei
- Traditional Chinese: 建威之戰
- Simplified Chinese: 建威之战
Transcriptions
Standard Mandarin
- Hanyu Pinyin: Jiànweī zhī zhàn

The Battle of Jianwei was fought between the contending states of Shu Han and Cao Wei in the Three Kingdoms period of China. The battle was also the third of a series of military campaigns against Wei launched by Shu's chancellor, Zhuge Liang. The battle concluded with a Shu victory and the capture of Wudu and Yinping commanderies, which were located near present-day Longnan, Gansu.

== The battle ==
In the spring of 229, Zhuge Liang ordered Chen Shi to lead troops to attack the Wei-controlled Wudu (武都; near present-day Cheng County, Gansu) and Yinping (陰平; present-day Wen County, Gansu) commanderies, In response, Guo Huai led his troops in an attempt to rescue those commanderies. Upon receiving news that the Wei general Guo Huai had mobilised his forces to attack Chen Shi, Zhuge Liang moved his army from Yangping Pass to Jianwei (建威; in present-day Longnan, Gansu) in the northwestern corner of Wudu Commandery.

Later; Guo Huai and his troops withdrew. The Shu forces thus successfully captured Wudu and Yinping commanderies.

== Aftermath ==
When Zhuge Liang returned from the campaign, the Shu emperor Liu Shan issued an imperial decree to congratulate him on his successes in defeating Wang Shuang during the second Northern Expedition, forcing Guo Huai to flee, winning back the trust of the local tribes and capturing Wudu and Yinping commanderies during the third Northern Expedition. He also restored Zhuge Liang to the position of Imperial Chancellor (丞相).

Achilles Fang's translation of Liu Shan's memorial is as follows:

"The fault at the battle of Jieting lay with Ma Su, but you held yourself responsible and demoted yourself drastically. Respecting your wishes, I complied with your principle. In the past year, you made our army illustrious and beheaded Wang Shuang. In the present year you led a campaign and put Guo Huai to flight, won the Di and the Qiang over to us, restored the two jun (commanderies); your prowess has shaken the lawless, your achievements have become pre-eminent. At present, the Empire is in disorder and the chief criminal is not yet decapitated. To allow you, who are entrusted with a great work and important business of state, to remain demoted for a long time is not the way to glorify grand merit. I now reinstate you as chengxiang (Imperial Chancellor); do not refuse it."

Following this battle, Cao Wei would launch their own campaign the next year, the Ziwu Campaign.
