= Ma Su =

Shu Han general and strategist (190-228)

- 馬謖
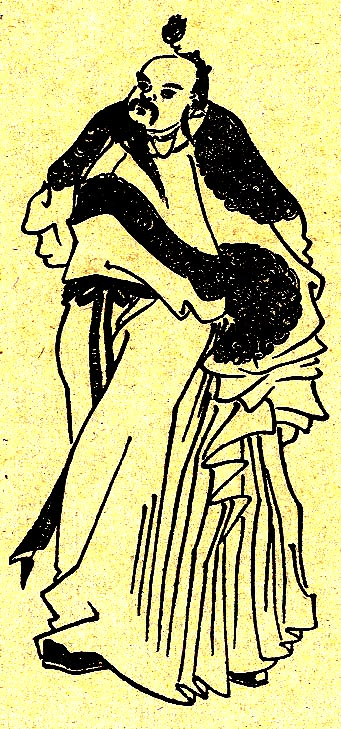
- A Qing dynasty illustration of Ma Su

Advisor (參軍)
- In office 223 – 228
- Monarch: Liu Shan
- Chancellor: Zhuge Liang

Administrator of Yuexi (越嶲太守) (under Liu Bei)
- In office ?–?
- Monarchs: Emperor Xian of Han/ Liu Bei (from 219)

Prefect of Chengdu (成都令) (under Liu Bei)
- In office 214 – ?
- Monarch: Emperor Xian of Han

Prefect of Mianzhu (綿竹令) (under Liu Bei)
- In office 213 – ?
- Monarch: Emperor Xian of Han
- Preceded by: Fei Shi

Assistant Officer (從事) (under Liu Bei)
- In office 209 – 213
- Monarch: Emperor Xian of Han

Personal details
- Born: 190 Yicheng, Hubei
- Died: 228 (aged 38)
- Relations: Ma Liang (brother); three other brothers; Ma Bing (nephew)
- Occupation: Military general, politician
- Courtesy name: Youchang (幼常)

Ma Su (190–228), courtesy name Youchang, was a Chinese military general and politician of the state of Shu Han in the Three Kingdoms period of China. Ma Su had conspicuous talent in military theories and was admired by the Shu chancellor Zhuge Liang. However, a tactical blunder by Ma Su at the Battle of Jieting resulted in Shu being dealt a huge defeat by Zhang He, a general of the rival state of Wei. He was a younger brother of Ma Liang.

Much dramatisation shrouds the death of Ma Su. According to the biography of Ma Su's close friend Xiang Lang, Ma Su was said to have attempted to flee with no further information if it was after or during his defeat at Jieting, but was captured. Following this, he was executed on Zhuge Liang's order and seemed to have faced death with dignity. Most cultural depictions concentrate on the latter part, such as the historical novel Romance of the Three Kingdoms as well as the Peking opera Loss of Jieting.

== Early life ==
Ma Su was born in Yicheng, Xiangyang Commandery, which is present-day Yicheng, Hubei. He was one of the five brothers in the Ma family, all of whom were renowned for their intellects and commonly known as the "Five Changs" (五常) as their style names all contained "Chang" (常). Although, Ma Su's elder brother Ma Liang was deemed to be the most talented among them all. Aside from his personal talent and military knowledge, Ma Su was described as a man about eight chi tall (approximately 1.84 metres), sociable and good at making friends. With a bright mind and deep expertise.

Together with Ma Liang, Ma Su began his service as an Assistant Officer (從事) under Liu Bei around 209, when Liu Bei succeeded Liu Qi as Governor of Jing Province (covering present-day Hubei and Hunan). In 211, he accompanied Liu Bei into Yi Province. Later, when conflict broke out between Liu Bei and Liu Zhang, Ma Su followed him with the army and served as a military advisor alongside Pang Tong and Fa Zheng. He was appointed as Prefect (令) of Mianzhu (綿竹) and Chengdu (成都). Thereafter, Ma Su was transferred to serve as Administrator of Yuexi (越嶲太守), a troubled commandery in the south. Yuexi was home to numerous indigenous tribes, many of whom refused to accept Liu Bei’s authority. It was the site of a significant tribal revolt led by Gao Ding (高定), the chief of the Sou tribe (叟族) in 218 that was successfully quelled with help from Li Yan.

As Ma Su had talent and ability that surpassed others and enjoyed discussing planning and strategy. Liu Bei's chief advisor, Zhuge Liang had been impressed by him and praised him as an exceptional individual. However, before Liu Bei died in 223, he warned Zhuge Liang that Ma Su's knowledge and speech exceed his real abilities and should not be given important appointments. Still, Zhuge Liang did not heed the warning, and Ma Su was made a personal military Advisor (參軍) soon after Liu Bei's death. The two were very close and would often hold discussions from dawn to dusk.

== Southern Campaign ==
During the campaign against Meng Huo, Ma Su went several tens of li to see Zhuge Liang off. Zhuge Liang told Ma Su: "It's been years since we strategized together, now I ask for your help with your wise and skilled planning."

Ma Su answered to Zhuge Liang as such: "Nanzhong relies on the distance from the capital and its difficult access, and it never submits for long. If we defeat them and leave, tomorrow they would rebel again. Now you are about to engage the whole state and army for a Northern Expedition against the powerful rebels. When the south learn that the authority of the government is weak then they will immediately rebel again. However, if all the tribes with their kinds are exterminated to end future worries then that would be inhumane as this is not the way of the benevolent man. Moreover, it would be a long affair. I learned that, in the way of using troops "attacking the heart is the wisest, attacking the city is worst. Psychological warfare is best, armed warfare is the worst." Therefore, I hope that you my lord will focus on subduing their hearts.”

Zhuge Liang followed Ma Su's advice, many times he forgave Meng Huo in order to gain the trust of the people of the South. Hence, until the end of Zhuge Liang’s life, the South did not rebel again.

== Performance in Jieting ==
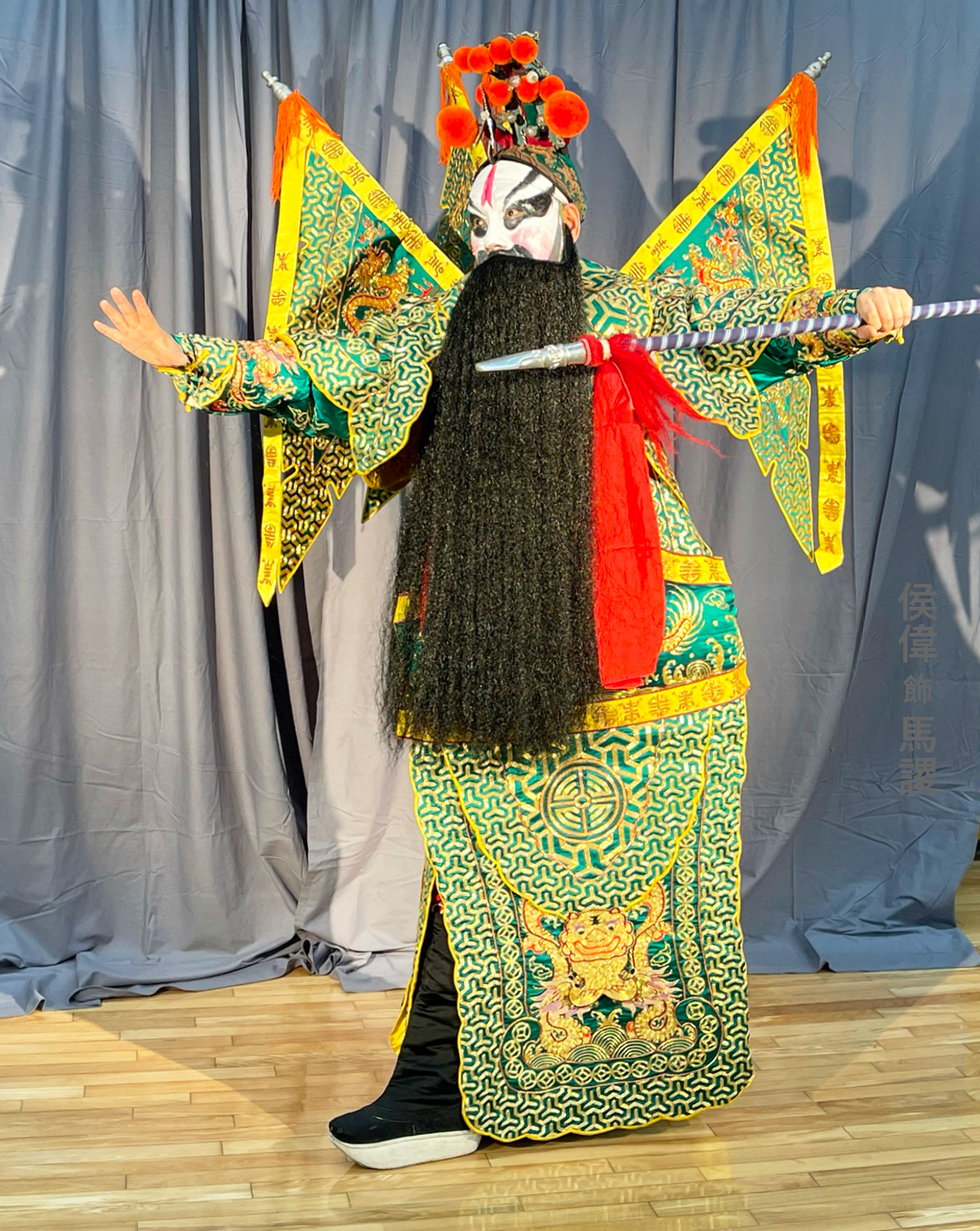
Ma Su of Lost Street Pavilion (Lost Jieting), a famous program of Peking opera

In 228, Zhuge Liang launched his Northern Expeditions against Wei, at the time there were veteran leaders such as Wei Yan and Wu Yi. Among the army, many advisors suggested appointing either one of them as the vanguard commander however Zhuge Liang disagreed with the majority and chose Ma Su to command the army at the front instead.

Ma Su's forces encountered Zhang He's forces at Jieting. It was here that Ma Su made a serious tactical blunder. He disobeyed Zhuge Liang's order to garrison his army inside the city of Jieting and had his troops camped on top of a hill, believing the vantage point would provide him with a more advantageous position in terms of observation and a place of attack. His subordinate Wang Ping advised against Ma Su's decision, arguing that their water supply might be cut off and their forces surrounded. While his good counsel was rejected, Ma Su allowed Wang Ping to take 1,000 men and camp nearby the Shu forces in support.

As Wang Ping predicted, Zhang He took advantage of Ma Su's mistake by striking at the Shu camp's water supply. He succeeded in cutting off the enemy's water supply. The parched soldiers of Shu were easily defeated when Zhang He launched an offensive on the main camp itself. Wang Ping, with only a handful of soldiers, did his best to keep the retreat organized and ordered his soldiers to beat their drums loudly to create the impression that reinforcements had arrived. Zhang He believed this to be an ambush and did not pursue. When Zhuge Liang arrived, he could not force Zhang He from his position and retreated to Hanzhong.

== Records on Ma Su's death ==
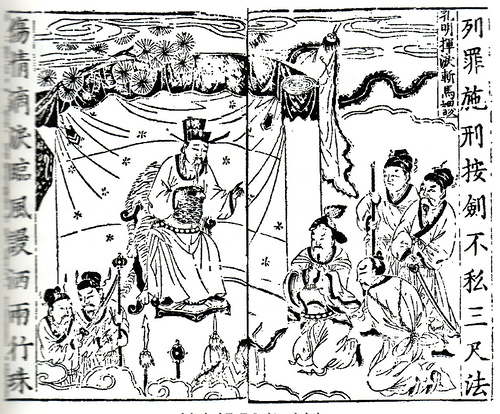
Kongming shedding tears as he subjects Ma Su to execution

According to a record from the biography of Xiang Lang in Sanguozhi, Xiang, as a close friend of Ma Su, didn't report him when he fled though the record makes no statement if it was during or after the battle. (Note: The quote can, together with other sources, be interpreted as Ma deserting his army earlier, but was captured and sent to jail.)

Although he survived the battle, Ma Su's army suffered a heavy defeat (Note: Wang Ping was able to regroup the scattered forces.), so he was soon arrested and sentenced to execution by a reluctant and tearful Zhuge Liang (Note: Although the text simply says that Ma Su died ("wugu", 物故), the implication is clear that he was executed.) as a way to soothe the troops. (Note: ((亮)戮謖以謝眾。); literally "(Zhuge) Liang had to execute (Ma) Su as an apology to the citizens)") Before his execution, Ma Su wrote a letter to Zhuge Liang: "You wise lord regarded me like a son and myself looked upon you as a father. I dearly hope that this is the righteousness of the execution of Gun leading to the rise of Yu the Great. May our whole life's relationship not be reduced by this. Though I shall die, I shall bear no resentments against the yellow earth." At the time, many among the army wept for his death.

When Jiang Wan later visited Hanzhong, he spoke with Zhuge Liang on this matter: "In the past, when the State of Chu killed Cheng Dechen then the joy of Duke Wen of Jin was great. Today, the Tianxia has yet to be unified. However, you put a man who is a knowledgeable strategist to death. Is it not regretful?" Zhuge Liang, in tears, answered: "The reason why Sun Tzu was able to dominate throughout the Tianxia was that he was clear in his application of the laws. Thus, it was because Yang Gan (楊干) had brought confusion to laws that Wei Jiang (魏絳) put Yang's charioteer to death. (Note: According to the Zuo Zhuan and the Shiji, Yang Gan was a brother of Duke Dao of Jin. Yang Gan once disrupted a meeting with Duke Dao in attendance. Duke Dao's minister Wei Jiang then killed Yang's charioteer as punishment.) Now that the (lands within the) Four Seas are still divided and war has just begun, if we again abandon the laws, then by what means shall we quell the rebels?"

Xi Zuochi harshly criticized Zhuge Liang for Ma Su's execution. Xi wrote: "Wasn't it appropriate that Zhuge Liang failed to unify the realm? When Xun Linfu (荀林父) was defeated by the army of Chu, the Duke of Jin refused to execute him, knowing his latter success would allow him to win the war. Meanwhile, King Cheng of Chu executed Cheng Dechen while being ignorant of all Cheng was doing for his country and therefore brought his own defeat. Now, Shu is situated in a remote location with less population and talent than the central plains. Yet, they executed their outstanding men and have to fall back and employed lesser men. To be so severe with the talented and not apply the "principle of three defeats" while wanting to realize great enterprises: isn't that difficult? Moreover, Liu Bei warned him that Ma Su shouldn't be employed in important matters. Why choose Ma Su rather than someone else? Zhuge Liang heard his warning but didn't follow it. Surely, he wasn't able to refuse Ma Su. However, Zhuge Liang was the chief minister of his empire and wanted to gather more resources. Yet, he didn't evaluate the ability of each to make the correct appointment and assigned people according to their talent. His judgement was wrong and he ignored his lord's brilliant advice. Hence, he failed and killed a man who had something to offer. After this, it seems hard to include him when speaking of the wise."

Li Sheng (李盛) and Zhang Xiu (張休) were also put to death with Ma Su. Huang Xi (黃襲) along with others were relieved of the command of their soldiers. Wang Ping, on the other hand, was promoted to General Who Attacks Bandits (討寇將軍) for his efforts in minimizing casualties and for trying to prevent Ma Su's actions. Zhuge Liang sent a memorial to the Emperor Liu Shan requesting to be demoted for the defeat at Jieting, which Liu Shan granted.

Regardless, Ma Su was deemed by Zhuge Liang and later by Liu Shan in an imperial memorial following the Battle of Jianwei to hold major responsibility for the failure of the first Northern Expedition. However, Ma Su's wife and children were well taken care of by Zhuge Liang after Ma Su's death. Zhuge Liang also personally offered sacrifice at Ma Su's grave.

== See also ==
- Lists of people of the Three Kingdoms
