= Chen Shi (Three Kingdoms) =

3rd century Shu Han state general

- Traditional Chinese: 陳式
- Simplified Chinese: 陈式
Transcriptions
Standard Mandarin
- Hanyu Pinyin: Chén Shì
- Wade–Giles: Chen Shih

Chen Jie
- Traditional Chinese: 陳戒
- Simplified Chinese: 陈戒
Transcriptions
Standard Mandarin
- Hanyu Pinyin: Chén Jiè
- Wade–Giles: Chen Chieh

Chen Shi (fl. 217–229) was a Chinese military officer of the state of Shu Han in the Three Kingdoms period of China. He previously served under the warlord Liu Bei in the late Eastern Han dynasty. His name is sometimes recorded as Chen Jie.

== Life ==
Little is recorded about Chen Shi in history. Information about him is scattered throughout the biographies of different persons and across different years in the Records of the Three Kingdoms, the authoritative source for the history of the Three Kingdoms period.

Chen Shi was first mentioned in 217 when he participated in the Hanzhong Campaign under Liu Bei's command. Liu Bei sent him and ten other officers to lead their troops to cut off the enemy's route along the gallery roads at Maminge Path (馬鳴閣道; in present-day Guangyuan, Sichuan). However, they were driven back by Xu Huang, a general under Liu Bei's rival Cao Cao, and many of Liu Bei's soldiers fell off the gallery roads into the deep valleys and died during the attack.

The second mention of Chen Shi was in 221–222 during the Battle of Xiaoting, which was fought between Liu Bei and his ally-turned-rival, Sun Quan, the founding emperor of the Eastern Wu state. Liu Bei, then already the emperor of the Shu Han state, had amassed an army to attack Sun Quan and seize back Jing Province, which Sun Quan captured from him in 219. In the initial stages of the battle, Liu Bei ordered Chen Shi and Wu Ban to lead the Shu navy and station at Yiling (southeast of present-day Yichang, Hubei) in between the east and west banks of the Yangtze River.

Chen Shi was mentioned for the third and last time in 229, during the reign of Liu Bei's son and successor, Liu Shan. He participated in the third of a series of military campaigns led by Shu's chancellor, Zhuge Liang, against Shu's rival state Wei. This is historically known as the Battle of Jianwei. Acting on Zhuge Liang's order, Chen Shi led troops to attack Wudu (武都) and Yinping (陰平) commanderies and conquered them for Shu. The Wei general Guo Huai attempted to seize back the two commanderies from Chen Shi, but retreated after Zhuge Liang had personally led an army from Jianwei (建威) to reinforce Chen Shi. (Note: Chen Shi is erroneously referred to in Zhuge Liang's biography in the Sanguozhi as "Chen Jie" (陳戒).)

== In Romance of the Three Kingdoms ==
In the 14th-century historical novel Romance of the Three Kingdoms, Chen Shi was captured at the Battle of Mount Dingjun by Xiahou Yuan's forces, but was released in exchange for Xiahou Shang, who was captured by Liu Bei's forces. In the novel, during Zhuge Liang's third Northern Expedition, after committing a strategic blunder, he tried to push the blame to Wei Yan but Zhuge Liang held him responsible and executed him.

== See also ==
- Lists of people of the Three Kingdoms
