= Fei Yao =

3rd century Cao Wei general

- 費曜 / 費耀 / 費瑤
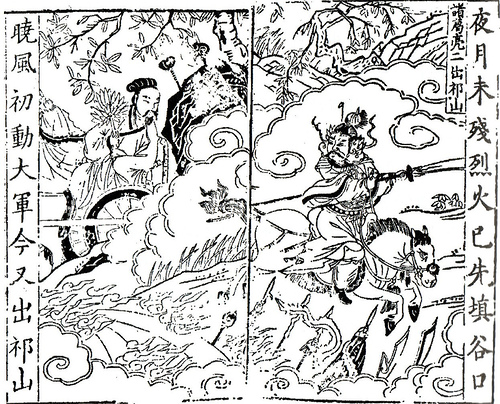
- A Qing dynasty illustration of Fei Yao (right) encountering Zhuge Liang on the battlefield

General of the Rear (後將軍)
- In office 230 – ?
- Monarch: Cao Rui

Personal details
- Born: Unknown
- Died: Unknown
- Occupation: General

Fei Yao (fl. 220–231) was a military general of the state of Cao Wei during the Three Kingdoms period of China.

== Life ==
Little information about Fei Yao is recorded in history; unlike other notable figures of the late Eastern Han dynasty and Three Kingdoms period, he does not have a biography in the 3rd-century text Records of the Three Kingdoms (Sanguozhi), the authoritative source for the history of that period. Information about him is found in parts of the biographies of other persons.

The first mention of Fei Yao was in 220, the year when the Cao Wei state was established and the beginning of the Three Kingdoms period. He joined the Wei general Cao Zhen in suppressing a rebellion by Zhang Jin (張進) in Jiuquan Commandery (酒泉郡; around present-day Jiuquan, Gansu).

In late 221, when the Lushuihu people started a rebellion in Liang Province (covering parts of present-day Shaanxi and Gansu), Fei Yao joined Zou Qi (鄒岐), Zhang Ji, Xiahou Ru (夏侯儒) and others in suppressing the rebellion.

In early 229, when Wei's rival state Shu Han sent an army to invade the Wei fortress at Chencang (陳倉; east of present-day Baoji, Shaanxi), Cao Zhen ordered Fei Yao to lead troops to reinforce Hao Zhao, the Wei general defending Chencang, but Hao Zhao held his ground and the Shu invaders retreated when Fei Yao showed up.

In 230, Fei Yao was promoted to the position of General of the Rear (後將軍). In the same year, the Shu regent Zhuge Liang, along with the Shu generals Wei Yan, Wu Yi and others, led Shu forces to attack Wei territories in Liang Province. Fei Yao and another Wei general, Guo Huai, engaged enemy forces under Wei Yan at Yangxi (陽溪), but were defeated and driven back.

Around March 231, Zhuge Liang led Shu forces to attack Wei again, leading to the Battle of Mount Qi. At the time, the Wei general Sima Yi was in charge of military affairs in Liang and Yong provinces. Sima Yi, with Zhang He, Fei Yao, Guo Huai, Dai Ling (戴陵) and others as his subordinates, led the Wei forces to resist the enemy. In April 231, Sima Yi sent Fei Yao and Dai Ling with 4,000 troops to defend Shanggui County (上邽縣; in present-day Tianshui, Gansu) while he led the remaining troops to attack the enemy at Mount Qi (祁山; the mountainous regions around present-day Li County, Gansu). Zhuge Liang led a detachment to attack Shanggui County while leaving the rest of his army to attack Mount Qi. Zhuge Liang and his troops defeated Guo Huai, Fei Yao and others and collected the harvest in Shanggui County.

== In Romance of the Three Kingdoms ==
Fei Yao appears as a minor character in the 14th-century historical novel Romance of the Three Kingdoms, which romanticises the events before and during the Three Kingdoms period. In the novel, he is one of Cao Zhen's subordinates and he participates in the defence of Wei territory during the second Shu invasion. He falls into an ambush set by Jiang Wei which is meant for Cao Zhen and commits suicide after being surrounded by the enemy.

== See also ==
- Lists of people of the Three Kingdoms

== Sources ==
- Chen Shou (1977) [429]. Pei Songzhi (ed.). Annotated Records of the Three Kingdoms 三國志注 (in Chinese). Taipei: Dingwen Printing.
- Luo Guanzhong (1998) [1300s]. 三國演義 [Romance of the Three Kingdoms] (in Chinese). Yonghe, Taiwan: Zhiyang Publishing House.
- Sima Guang, ed. (1934) [1084]. Zizhi Tongjian (in Chinese). Hong Kong: Zhonghua Shuju.
