= Dasan Pass =

- Sanguan Pass
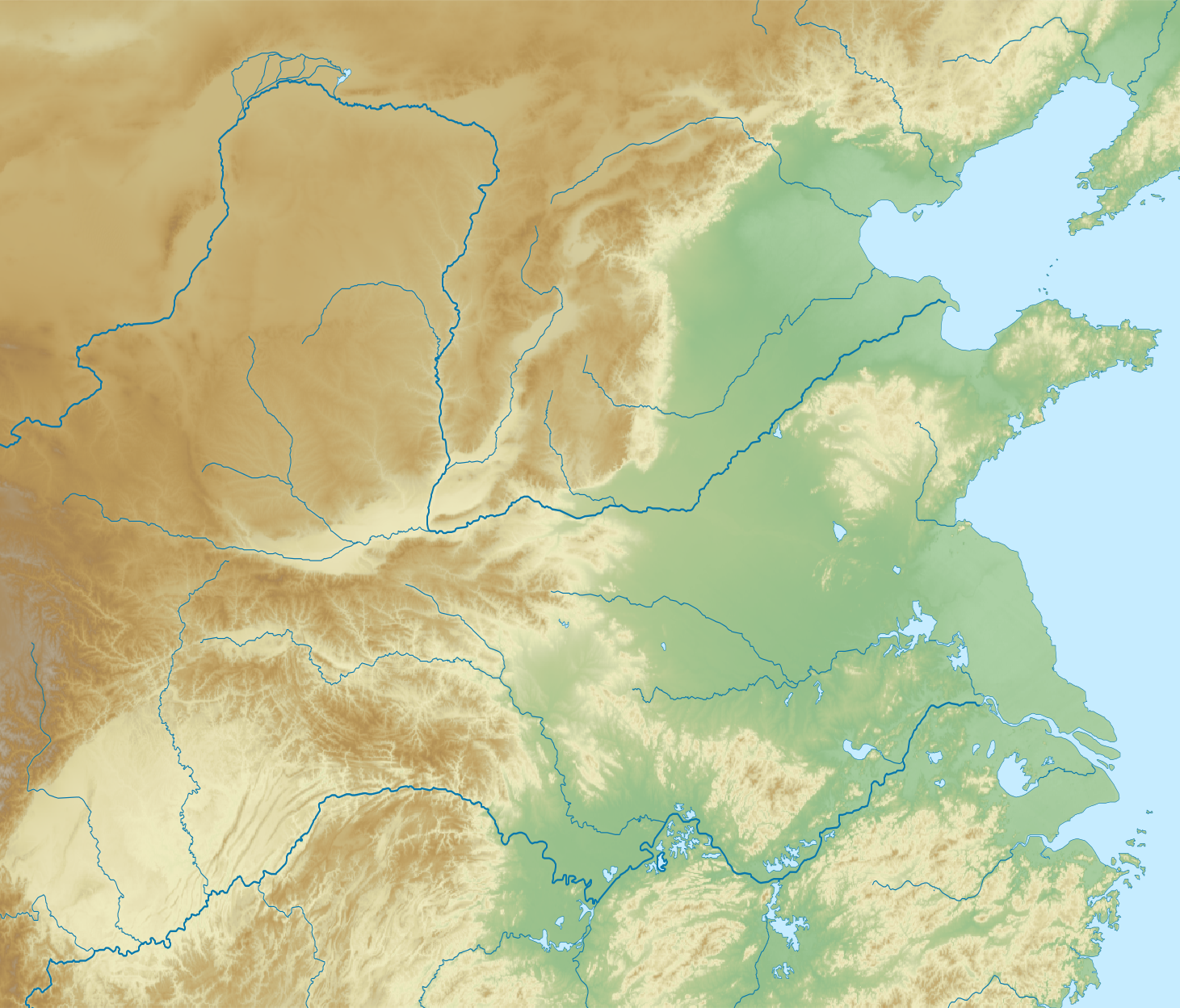
- Location within Northern China Location within China
- Traversed by: Shaanxi Provincial Road S212

Third Approach
- Location: Baoji City, Shaanxi Pronvince, China
- Range: Qin Mountains
- Coordinates: 34°16′18″N 107°00′36″E

Dasan Pass
- Simplified Chinese: 大散关
- Traditional Chinese: 大散關
- Literal meaning: Great Dissolve Pass
Transcriptions
Standard Mandarin
- Hanyu Pinyin: Dà Sǎn Guān

Dasan Pass or Sanguan Pass (simplified Chinese: 大散关; traditional Chinese: 大散關; pinyin: Dà Sǎn Guān; lit. 'Great Dissolve Pass') is a mountain pass located in the west mountain area of the city of Baoji in Shaanxi province.

It was a military mountain gate guarding the Guanzhong Plain since the Zhou dynasty period. Due to its strategic location, more than 70 battles have been fought here throughout Chinese history. In the year 1131, two Song dynasty generals Wu Jie and Wu Lin, who were brothers, were stationed here to defend against the Jin general Wanyan Wulu.
