= Li Yan (Three Kingdoms) =

Shu Han general (died 234)

- 李嚴

Central Protector-General (中都護)
- In office 230 – September or October 231
- Monarch: Liu Shan
- Chancellor: Zhuge Liang

General of Agile Cavalry (驃騎將軍)
- In office 230
- Monarch: Liu Shan
- Chancellor: Zhuge Liang

General of the Vanguard (前將軍)
- In office 226 – 230
- Monarch: Liu Shan
- Chancellor: Zhuge Liang

Minister of the Household (光祿勳)
- In office 226 – 230
- Monarch: Liu Shan
- Chancellor: Zhuge Liang

Prefect of the Masters of Writing (尚書令)
- In office 222 – 223
- Monarch: Liu Bei
- Chancellor: Zhuge Liang

General Who Assists Han (輔漢將軍)
- In office 218 – 222

General Who Revives Glory (興業將軍)
- In office c. 214 – 218

Administrator of Qianwei (犍為太守)
- In office c. 214 – 218

Personal details
- Born: Unknown; Nanyang, Henan
- Died: 234; Zitong County, Sichuan
- Children: Li Feng
- Occupation: General
- Courtesy name: Zhengping (正方)
- Other name: Li Ping (李平)
- Peerage: Marquis of a Chief District (都鄉侯)

Li Yan (died c.October 234), courtesy name Zhengfang, also known as Li Ping, was a military general of the state of Shu Han during the Three Kingdoms period of China. He climbed to the zenith of his career when he was asked by the Shu emperor Liu Bei to be the military paramountcy and co-regent alongside Zhuge Liang for his son and successor, Liu Shan. After the death of Liu Bei, Li Yan was given the rank of General of the Vanguard which was last held by Guan Yu back in 220. Li served most of his career in the mid and late 220s as the area commander for the Eastern Front centered in Yong An with Chen Dao as his deputy; he never faced any major battles in his position. However, during the 230s and the 4th of Zhuge Liang's Northern Expeditions, Li Yan was given a higher rank of General of the Agile Cavalry, below only Zhuge Liang. He was assigned to handle logistics, but he was unable to deliver supplies to Zhuge Liang's army in a timely manner. After his attempt to fraudulently cover his inability to follow commands, Li Yan was stripped from positions and power.

== Early life and career ==
During his youth, Li Yan worked as a civil clerk in Jing Province (covering present-day Hubei and Hunan) under the provincial governor Liu Biao, and had earned himself a reputation of being competent. When the northern warlord Cao Cao launched a campaign in 208 to seize control of Jing Province, Li Yan became one of the refugees who escaped the province, and entered Yi Province (covering present-day Sichuan and Chongqing), which was under control of Liu Zhang.

Liu Zhang appointed Li Yan as the Prefect of Chengdu, and once again, Li Yan distinguished himself on his new post. Later, when the warlord Liu Bei invaded Yi Province, Li Yan was assigned as an army controller after initial resistance proved futile. Li was supposed to repel the invading army at Mianzhu, a strategic stronghold that laid before Yi Province's capital Chengdu; however, Li Yan led his subordinates to surrender to Liu Bei when the latter arrived. For his timely defection, Li Yan was appointed as a Major-General.

== Service under Liu Bei ==
After Liu Bei conquered Yi Province, Li Yan was appointed as the Administrator (太守) of Qianwei Commandery (犍為郡) and General Who Revives Glory (興業將軍), as a follow-up solidification of the new regime. Even being a newcomer, Li Yan was invited to constitute the Shu Ke (蜀科; the code of law for the Shu region) with Zhuge Liang, Fa Zheng, Yi Ji and Liu Ba. (The Shu Ke was the most important guidance on the legal system of the Shu Han state later.) Li Yan continued to prove his talent as a commandery administrator — several major civil projects were initiated and conducted under his leadership: a tunnel was dug through Mount Tianshe, roads along rivers were repaired, infrastructures within his jurisdiction were decorated and rebuilt. Residents under Li Yan's rule were pleased. However, he started to reveal his weak intra-bureaucratic relationship with his peer. Yang Hong, Li Yan's official chief assistant, opposed one of Li Yan's reconstruction projects — the relocation of the Administrator's residency. Li Yan refused to listen to Yang Hong's suggestion; Yang Hong resigned after repeatedly objecting to Li Yan's plan. Wang Chong, a General of Standard under Li Yan, purportedly defected to Wei after a major fall-out with his supervisor.

In 218, while Liu Bei was wrestling control with Cao Cao over Hanzhong Commandery, the bandit leaders Ma Qin (馬秦) and Gao Sheng (高勝) rebelled. The rebels controlled Zizhong County and gathered several tens of thousands people to join their cause. Since the majority of the mobile forces were deadlocked in the Hanzhong frontline, Li Yan could only muster 5,000-strong local defensive forces in Qianwei Commandery, where he successfully suppressed the revolt and brought back stability and order to the province and his people. Gao Ding, the leader of the Sou (叟) tribe, also took this opportunity to attack Xindao County (新道縣), but Li Yan deftly led his unit to defend the county and repelled Gaoding's aggression. For his effort, Li Yan was promoted to General Who Assists Han (輔漢將軍).

In 222, Liu Bei suffered a devastating defeat to the eastern warlord, Sun Quan, at the Battle of Xiaoting and died not long later in Baidicheng. During this year, he summoned Li Yan to Baidicheng and promoted him to the rank of Prefect of the Masters of Writing (尚書令). On his death bed, Liu Bei specifically asked Li Yan to be a co-regent with Zhuge Liang to take care of his son, Liu Shan, and appointed Li Yan as Central Protector-General (中都護) to handle all military matters — both imperial guards and standard armies were supposed to be under his command. He was also put in charge of the defense of Yong'an County (永安縣; present-day Fengjie County, Chongqing) near the border between Shu and its ally state Wu. According to Liu Bei's dying wish, Li Yan should be the military paramountcy within the Shu regime. Liu's choice fell on Li because by 223, other original Yi officials likely to be given the position, Fa Zheng and Dong He had already died, while Huang Quan had surrendered to Wei the year before and Wu Yi (Three Kingdoms) wasn't considered as talented as Li Yan.

== Service under Shu Han ==
=== As a co-regent ===
When Yong Kai, a local leader in the Nanzhong region, started a rebellion and declared independence from Shu rule, Li Yan tried to tap into his personal influence to dissuade Yong Kai from doing so, by writing a total of six letters to him, but to no avail. Gao Ding and Meng Huo also fanned the uprising and the campaign became a major revolution, which prompted Zhuge Liang to retaliate with military force.

After his successful southern subjugation and repair of the Wu–Shu alliance, Zhuge Liang, utilising his huge bureaucratic power and influence, carried out a series of human resource rearrangement. After prescribing several officers as palace attendants for the young emperor, Zhuge Liang continued to spend considerable effort in strengthening ties with Wu. Chen Zhen (Three Kingdoms), a close associate of Zhuge Liang, was selected to be the ambassador to congratulate Sun Quan's enthronement in 229. Before his departure, Chen Zhen told Zhuge Liang that "Li Yan has scales in his stomach" but Zhuge Liang replied that he would rather praise Li Yan than to attack him because the situation had not been settled.

Around 226, Li Yan was promoted to Minister of the Household (光祿勳) and enfeoffed with the Marquis of a Chief District (都鄉侯). The same year, he was given a new rank as General of the Vanguard (前將軍). Later, Zhuge Liang attempted to replace Wei Yan, the area commander of Hanzhong assigned by Liu Bei, with Li Yan. Li Yan was the acting area commander of the eastern front at the time, so such a move transferred him form the east to the north without technically changing his rank; however, Li Yan did not perceive it thus. On the other hand, Li Yan suggested Zhuge Liang to create a new province, Ba Province, with five commanderies and recommended himself to be the Inspector of this new Ba Province. Zhuge Liang did not agree to Li Yan's suggestion. Li Yan however reassigned his position to Jiangzhou (江州; in present-day Chongqing). In the following years, Li Yan and Zhuge Liang shared a competitive, yet cooperative relationship.

In a letter to the recently defected Meng Da, Li Yan wrote that both Kongming and he were entrusted with a difficult task and a lot of responsibilities follows it. Yet, he was lucky to have such a great partner. Zhuge Liang also wrote a letter to Meng Da where he praised Li Yan's abilities and conduct. Li Yan once sent a letter to Zhuge Liang, stating the latter should receive the nine bestowments and become a vassal king of the Shu regime; Zhuge Liang replied that he would do so only after Shu had vanquished its rival state, Wei. The letter was written as such :

“You and I know each other since a long time yet we no longer understand reciprocally each other! Your mission should be to support the restoration of the State and be worried of improper ways hence I cannot be silent. At first, I was of humble rank from the eastern region yet my talent was exaggerated by the Former Emperor and now my rank is the highest among the officials, my salary and bestowment far too many. At this moment, the suppression of the rebels hasn't been accomplished. You who understand that our task is still going would encourage us to receive undeserved favor and wait with glorious titles. It isn't the path of the virtuous. Now, if we vanquish the rebels and slay Cao Rui with the emperor recovering his imperial seat, then both you and I would rise. In that case, I would accept even ten bestowments, all the more for nine!”

In August 230, the Wei general Cao Zhen launched a punitive campaign against Shu as a form of retaliation against Zhuge Liang's previous attacks. Zhuge Liang urged Li Yan to lead 20,000 troops to Hanzhong Commandery to defend against the Wei invasion. However, Li Yan did not want to leave his home base and serve under Zhuge Liang, so he told the latter that he should have the right to open an office (just like Zhuge Liang) as a co-regent. Zhuge Liang denied Li Yan's request, but appeased him by allowing his son, Li Feng, to replace him if he did come to Hanzhong Commandery. Li Yan finally went to Hanzhong Commandery under persuasion and pressure from Zhuge Liang.

=== As a logistic officer ===
After the Wei attack stalled due to continuous rainfall, Li Yan was not permitted to go back to the east. Instead, Zhuge Liang included Li Yan as a member of his cabinet, granting the latter access to the Imperial Chancellor's office to help prepare for future campaigns against Wei. Thus, Li Yan changed his name to "Li Ping", compromised on Zhuge Liang's war plan, and accepted the role of a logistic officer for Zhuge Liang's fourth northern expedition.

As the fourth expedition dragged on for months, Zhuge Liang and the Wei general Sima Yi had been having a series of battles around Mount Qi, and both sides needed backup supplies. However, rainfall rendered the transportation lines impassable, and Li Yan failed to provide supplies to Zhuge Liang's camp. Instead of informing Liu Shan of the situation, Li Yan attempted to cover up his failure. Li Yan had the Advisor to the Army Hu Zhong (狐忠) and the Commander of the Army Cheng Fan (成藩) deliver a letter to Zhuge Liang, informing the commander of the logistic problem, and asked the latter to return. When Zhuge Liang got back to Hanzhong Commandery, Li Yan told him that the food supply was ready and asked him why he retreated. At the same time, Li Yan sent Liu Shan a memo which says "the army feigned retreat in order to lure the enemy to do battle", hoping that Zhuge Liang would resume the war so his failure to transport supplies would go unnoticed.

However, Zhuge Liang absolved himself from the campaign, and returned to Chengdu to deal with Li Yan. On the way back to Chengdu from Hanzhong Commandery, Zhuge Liang did not reprimand Li Yan, but he secretly preserved Li Yan's letter. When the returning officers greeted the emperor at the imperial palace, Zhuge Liang showed Li Yan's handwritten letter to Liu Shan, so Li Yan could not deny his fault. Then, Zhuge Liang asked Liu Shan to strip Li Yan off all of his titles and official posts and exile him to Zitong Commandery. There, Li Yan lived the rest of his life as a civilian until he heard the news of Zhuge Liang's death in 234, after which he became ill and died. Li Yan always hoped that Zhuge Liang would forgive him and reemploy him, thinking that officials replacing Zhuge wouldn't do so. Hence his pain and anger when he heard that Zhuge died. After Li Yan's dismissal from office, Zhuge Liang kept employing his son Li Feng (李豐) and encouraged him to do his best under Jiang Wan so he may regain his father's honor. After Li Yan's death, Li Feng reached the rank of Administrator of Zhuti (朱提太守).

Xi Zuochi commented on Li Yan's cause of death and Zhuge Liang's application of law:

"In the ancient times, because they were found guilty of an offense and in accordance with the law, Duke Huan of Qi ordered Guan Zhong to seize three hundred households of the Bo Clan (伯氏). However since Guan Zhong's law enforcement was fair, they never complained. People of wisdom thought this attitude worthy and praised Guan Zhong for his just application of law. In comparison with this, Zhuge Liang's death made Liao Li shed tears and Li Ping to die of despair even though he was responsible for their dismissal from office. Though Water may bend, It stays of utmost evenness and adapt. Though Mirrors may show ugliness, It reflects without judgement. Both Water and Mirrors reveal the concealed without any complaints; this is because there is an absence of Ego. Water and Mirrors are without Ego and so avoid slander. So all the more difficult for men of high rank put in position of power over people to accept the judgement of others. Promoting people into positions of power yet they have no Ego, pronouncing sentences over people and yet they have no anger. Can one act as such and avoid resentment in this world? Zhuge Liang therefore can be praised for his enforcement of the law; from the Qin era to the Han era, few can compare."

== See also ==
- Lists of people of the Three Kingdoms
