= Wooden ox =

Single-wheeled cart with two handles

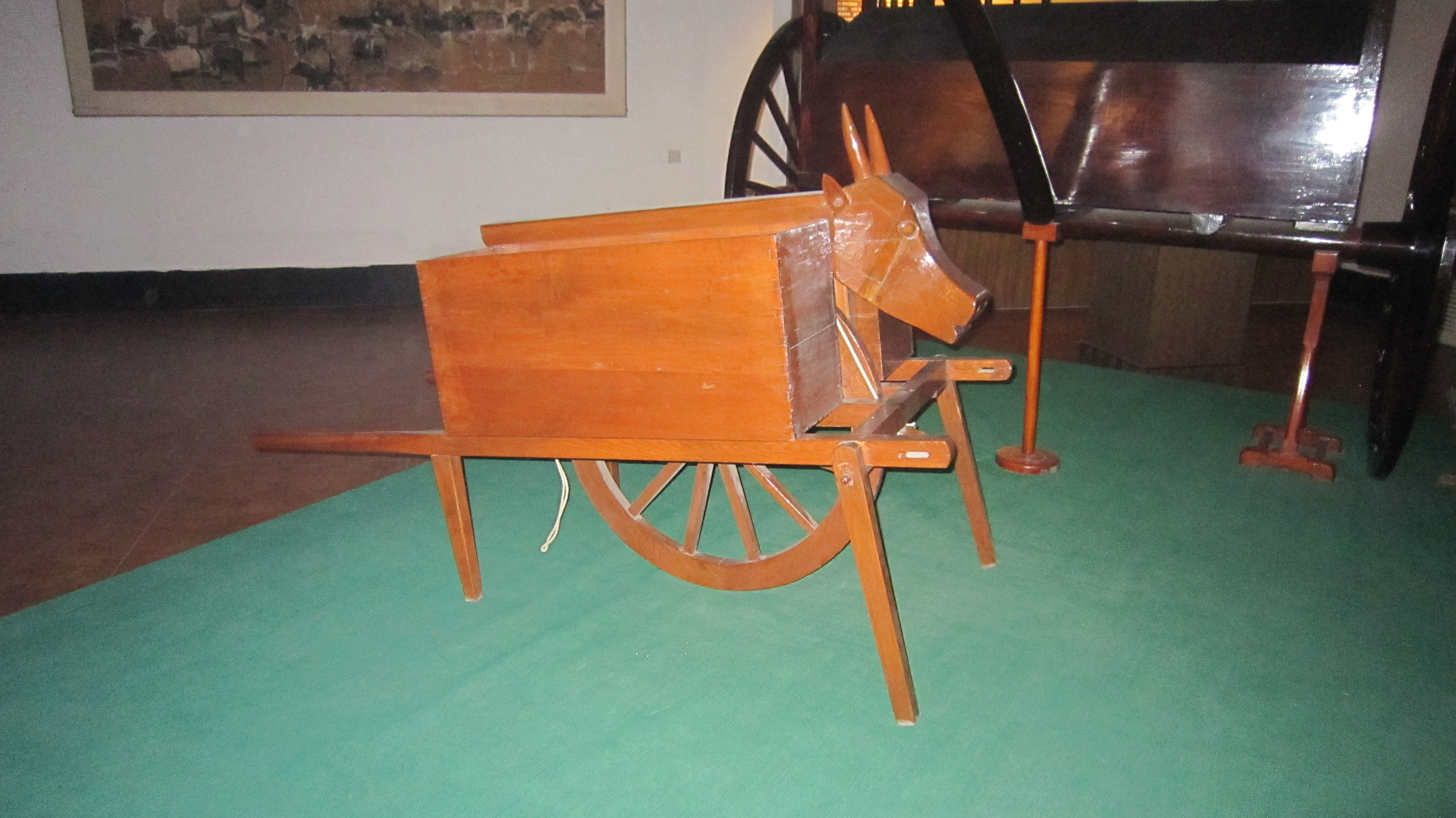
Wooden ox replica in the Ancient Chariot Museum in Zibo, China

The wooden ox (木牛流馬; lit. wooden ox and flowing horse) was a single-wheeled cart with two handles (i.e., a wheelbarrow) whose invention within China is sometimes credited to Zhuge Liang while he served Shu Han around the year 230 CE. The wooden ox purportedly allowed a single man to transport enough food to supply four others for up to three months, and this allowed for the feeding of large armies in the field. The wooden ox is pulled from the front, like an ox with a yoke; the flowing horse is pushed from behind. The basic device, however, appears to have been recorded centuries earlier in stone carvings dating from as early as 206 BCE.
