= Wu Yi (Three Kingdoms) =

Chinese general of Shu Han state (died 237)

- 吳懿 / 吳壹 (Note: The Sanguozhi recorded Wu Yi's name as 吴壹 instead of 吴懿 due to naming taboo; Sima Yi's (posthumously known as Emperor Xuan of Jin) given name was 懿.)

General of Chariots and Cavalry (車騎將軍)
- In office 234 – 237
- Monarch: Liu Shan

Inspector of Yong Province (雍州刺史) (nominal)
- In office 234 – 237
- Monarch: Liu Shan

Area Commander of Hanzhong (漢中都督)
- In office 234 – 237
- Monarch: Liu Shan
- Succeeded by: Wang Ping

General of the Left (左將軍)
- In office 230 – 234
- Monarch: Liu Shan

Chief Controller of Guanzhong (關中都督)
- In office 221 – 230
- Monarch: Liu Bei / Liu Shan

Personal details
- Born: Unknown Kaifeng, Henan
- Died: 237 Hanzhong, Shaanxi
- Relations: Empress Mu (sister); Wu Ban (relative)
- Occupation: Military General
- Courtesy name: Ziyuan (子遠)
- Peerage: Marquis of Jiyang (濟陽侯)

Wu Yi (died 237), courtesy name Ziyuan was a Chinese military general of the state of Shu Han in the Three Kingdoms period of China. His younger sister, Empress Mu, was the empress consort of Shu's founding emperor, Liu Bei. Wu Yi had a younger relative, Wu Ban, who also served as a general in Shu.

== Life ==
As information about Wu Yi's life was initially lost over the course of history, Chen Shou did not write a biography for Wu Yi in the Records of the Three Kingdoms (Sanguozhi) in the third century. However, Chen Shou still annotated some information about his life to his appraisal in Yang Xi's Ji Han Fuchen Zan (季漢輔臣贊; pub. 241) found in the volume 45 of the Sanguozhi.

Wu Yi was from Chenliu Commandery (陳留郡), which is around present-day Kaifeng, Henan. Wu Yi lost his father while he was still young. However, his father was also a friend of Liu Yan therefore along with his entire family accompanied him into Yi Province (covering present-day Sichuan and Chongqing) around 188 when the latter was appointed as the Governor of Yi Province by the central government of the Eastern Han dynasty. Wu Yi was also in-laws with Liu Yan, as his younger sister married Liu Mao (劉瑁), Liu Yan's son.

Following Liu Yan's death in 194, Wu Yi continued serving under Liu Zhang, Liu Yan's son and successor as the Governor of Yi Province. Liu Zhang appointed him as a General of the Household (中郎將). Between 212 and 214, when the warlord Liu Bei attacked Liu Zhang in an attempt to seize control of Yi Province, Wu Yi fought on Liu Zhang's side and led troops to fight Liu Bei's forces at Fu County (涪縣; in present-day Mianyang, Sichuan). However, he surrendered to Liu Bei after being defeated.

After completely taking control over Yi Province by 214, Liu Bei appointed Wu Yi as General Who Protects the Army and Attacks Rebels (護軍討逆將軍) and married Wu Yi's sister. In 221 during the Three Kingdoms period, after Liu Bei declared himself emperor and established the state of Shu Han, he appointed Wu Yi as Chief Controller of Guanzhong (關中都督).

After Liu Bei's death in 223, Wu Yi continued serving under Liu Bei's son and successor, Liu Shan. In 230, he followed the Shu general Wei Yan to attack Nan'an Commandery (南安郡; southeast of present-day Longxi County, Gansu), which was under the control of Shu's rival state, Wei. They defeated Wei forces led by Fei Yao in the battle. In recognition of Wu Yi's contributions, Liu Shan first enfeoffed Wu Yi as a village marquis (亭侯), but promoted him to a district marquis later under the title "Marquis of Gaoyang District" (高陽鄉侯). He also appointed Wu Yi as General of the Left (左將軍).

In 234, when Zhuge Liang, the Imperial Chancellor of Shu, died, Liu Shan appointed Wu Yi as General of Chariots and Cavalry (車騎將軍), granted him imperial authority, and ordered him to oversee military affairs in Hanzhong Commandery as Area Commander of Hanzhong (漢中都督). Liu Shan also appointed Wu Yi as the nominal Inspector (刺史) of Yong Province (because Yong Province was not under Shu control), in addition to promoting him to a county marquis under the title "Marquis of Jiyang" (濟陽侯). Wu Yi died in 237.

== See also ==
- Lists of people of the Three Kingdoms
