= Lü Yi (Shu Han) =

Official of the state of Shu Han (died 251)

- 呂乂

Prefect of the Masters of Writing (尚書令)
- In office 246 – 251
- Monarch: Liu Shan
- Preceded by: Dong Yun
- Succeeded by: Chen Zhi

Master of Writing (尚書)
- In office ? – 246
- Monarch: Liu Shan

Administrator of Shu Commandery (蜀郡太守)
- In office ?–?
- Monarch: Liu Shan

Administrator of Guanghan (廣漢太守)
- In office 234 – ?
- Monarch: Liu Shan

Administrator of Baxi (巴西太守)
- In office ?–?
- Monarch: Liu Shan

Personal details
- Born: Unknown
- Died: 251
- Children: Lü Chen; Lü Ya
- Parent: Lü Chang (father)
- Occupation: Official
- Courtesy name: Jiyang (季陽)

Lü Yi (died 251), courtesy name Jiyang, was an official of the state of Shu Han during the Three Kingdoms period of China.

== Life ==
Lü Yi's ancestral home was in Nanyang Commandery (南陽郡), which is around present-day Nanyang, Henan. His father, Lü Chang (呂常), escorted Liu Yan into Yi Province (covering present-day Sichuan and Chongqing) around 188 when Liu Yan was appointed as the Governor of Yi Province by the central government of the Eastern Han dynasty. After completing his mission, Lü Chang could not return to Nanyang Commandery because the road was obstructed, so he had no choice but to remain in Yi Province and settle down there. Lü Yi was most probably born in Yi Province.

Lü Yi became orphaned at a young age. He was fond of reading, calligraphy, and playing drums and the guqin. It is not known whether he served as an official under Liu Yan or Liu Yan's son and successor, Liu Zhang, when they were the Governors of Yi Province.

In 214, after the warlord Liu Bei seized control of Yi Province from Liu Zhang, he set up a Salt Office (鹽府) in his administration to oversee and regulate the production and trade of salt. During this time, Lü Yi served in the Salt Office as an assistant official tasked with keeping track of profits from the trading of salt and iron. When Wang Lian was serving as Colonel of the Salt Office (鹽府校尉), he promoted Lü Yi, Du Qi (杜祺)and Liu Gan (劉幹) (Note: Du Qi (杜祺) served as the administrator of various commanderies before directly serving under the General-in-Chief Fei Yi. Liu Gan (劉幹) also served in various positions but the highest appointment he ever got was Administrator of Baxi Commandery. Both Du Qi and Liu Gan were known to be close friends of Lü Yi, and were on par with him in terms of fame. However, Lü Yi enjoyed a better reputation than them for his frugal lifestyle and professional working style.) to the position of diancao duwei (典曹都尉) under him.

After the end of the Eastern Han dynasty in 220, Lü Yi served in the state of Shu Han, founded by Liu Bei in 221, during the Three Kingdoms period of China. Following Liu Bei's death in 223, he continued serving under Liu Shan, Liu Bei's son and successor.

Lü Yi rose through the ranks and consecutively served as the Prefect (令) of Xindu County (新都縣; present-day Xindu District, Chengdu, Sichuan) and Mianzhu County (緜竹縣; southeast of present-day Mianzhu, Sichuan), which were under Guanghan Commandery (廣漢郡). During his tenures, he gained a reputation for being benevolent and compassionate towards the common people. He received the highest praise among all the county prefects in Guanghan Commandery. He was later promoted to serve as the Administrator (太守) of Baxi Commandery (巴西郡; around present-day Langzhong, Sichuan).

Between 228 and 234, Zhuge Liang, the Imperial Chancellor of Shu, led the Shu armies on a series of military campaigns against Shu's rival state, Wei. During the campaigns, Zhuge Liang had to frequently ask the various commanderies in Shu to recruit manpower and gather resources, and send them to the frontline. While many commandery administrators failed to meet the deadlines for sending troops and supplies to the frontline, Lü Yi managed to recruit 5,000 troops in Baxi Commandery and send them to Zhuge Liang in time. As he had explained to those 5,000 soldiers why they were going to war and instilled a strong sense of discipline in them, none of them deserted along the way. Due to Lü Yi's good track record, the Shu government reassigned him to be the Administrator of Hanzhong Commandery and put him in charge of overseeing agricultural production and the transportation of food supplies to the frontline.

Following Zhuge Liang's death in 234, Lü Yi was first reassigned to be the Administrator of Guanghan Commandery (廣漢郡; around present-day Guanghan, Sichuan) and later as the Administrator of Shu Commandery (蜀郡; around present-day Chengdu, Sichuan). As Shu Commandery was centred around the imperial capital, Chengdu, it had the largest population among all the commanderies. In the six or seven years of relative peace after Zhuge Liang's death, (Note: There was a period of about six or seven years of relative peace in Shu between the last of Zhuge Liang's Northern Expeditions in 234 and the first of Jiang Wei's Northern Expeditions in 240.) the Shu government decided to give out compensation to war veterans. During this time, many people attempted to cheat the system by impersonating dead soldiers or pretending to have fought in the campaigns, so that they could claim the compensation. When Lü Yi found out, he immediately imposed stricter regulations to prevent such abuses of the system. At the same time, he also counselled the people and explained to them the benefits of serving in the military. His efforts proved successful as within a few years, over 10,000 men voluntarily joined the army.

Lü Yi was later reassigned to be a Master of Writing (尚書) in the central government. In 246, following Dong Yun's death, Lü Yi replaced him as Prefect of the Masters of Writing (尚書令; i.e., the director of the imperial secretariat). During his tenure, he gained a reputation for efficiency: he dealt with important matters without delay, and quickly cleared the queues of officials with issues waiting to be heard. He died in 251.

== Family ==
Lü Yi had at least two sons: Lü Chen (呂辰) and Lü Ya (呂雅). Lü Chen also served as an official in Shu and rose to the position of Prefect of Chengdu (成都令) sometime between 258 and 263. Lü Ya, who was known for his literary talent, served as an Internuncio (謁者) and wrote the 15-chapter Ge Lun (格論).

== Appraisal ==
Throughout his service in Shu in both the central government and regional administrations, Lü Yi was known for being highly competent, professional and efficient in his working style. On a personal level, he led a simple and frugal lifestyle, and was known for being humble, modest and reserved in speech. However, he was also criticised for being inflexible and overly strict in applying the laws, and for his preference for bureaucracy over talent. Towards the end of his career, even though he made it to one of the highest offices – Prefect of the Masters of Writing (尚書令) – in the central government, he remained a very unpopular figure at the commandery and county levels.

Chen Shou, the historian who wrote Lü Yi's biography in the Records of the Three Kingdoms, pointed out that Lü Yi gained a good reputation when he was serving as a county prefect or commandery administrator, but became highly unpopular after he started serving in the central government. He remarked that Lü Yi was of a lower calibre as compared to Huang Ba (黃霸) and Xue Xuan (薛宣), two famous officials who served as chancellors in the Western Han dynasty.

== In Romance of the Three Kingdoms ==
Lü Yi's name is rendered as 呂義 (traditional) / 吕义 (simplified) in the 14th-century historical novel Romance of the Three Kingdoms.

== See also ==
- Lists of people of the Three Kingdoms
