= Dong Yun =

Shu Han state general and official (died 246)

- 董允
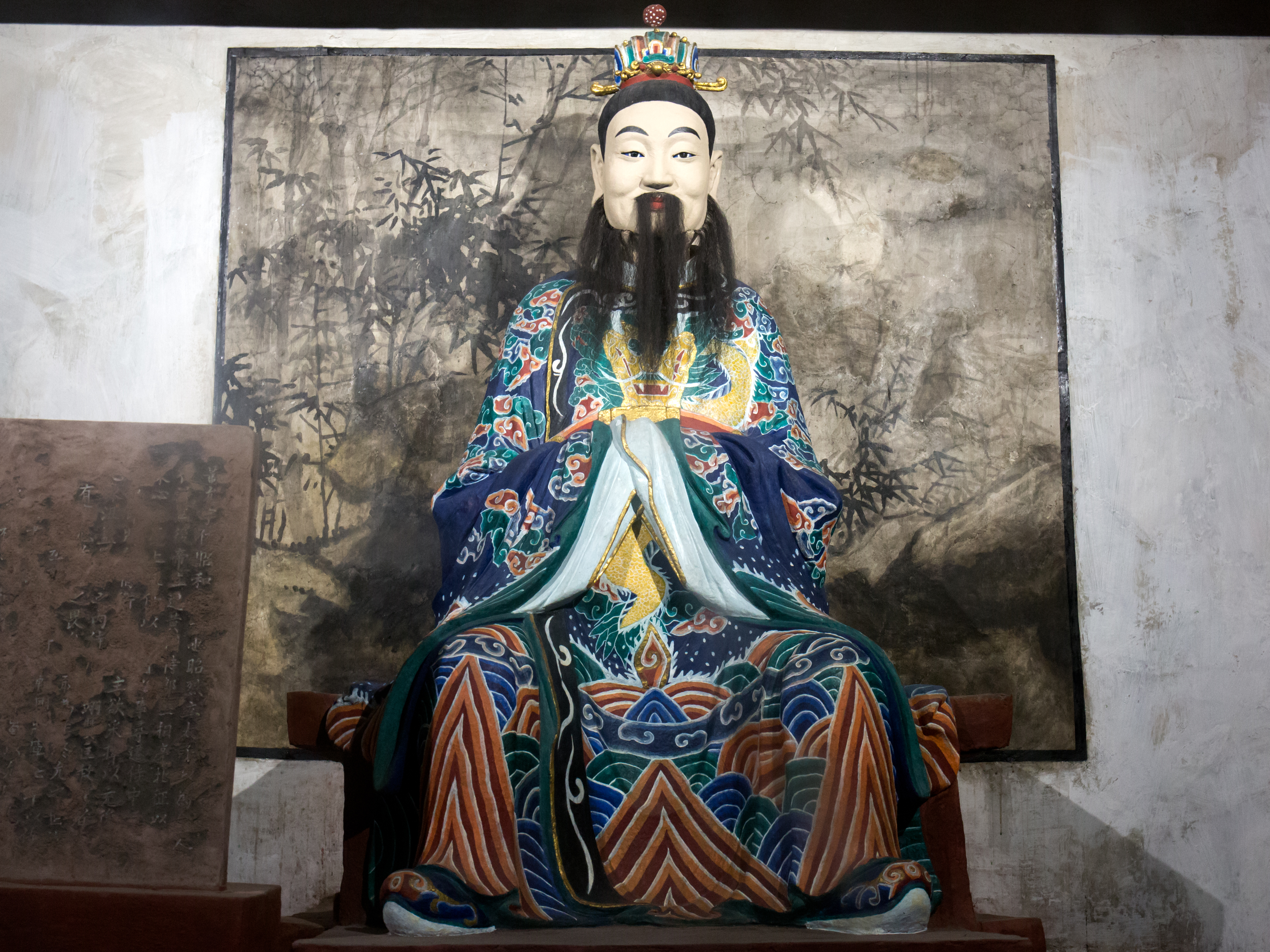
- Statue of Dong Yun in the Zhuge Liang Memorial Temple in Chengdu, Sichuan

Prefect of the Masters of Writing (尚書令)
- In office 244 – 246
- Monarch: Liu Shan
- Preceded by: Fei Yi
- Succeeded by: Lü Yi

Palace Attendant
- In office 244 – 246
- Monarch: Liu Shan

General Who Assists the State (輔國將軍)
- In office 243 – 244
- Monarch: Liu Shan

Huben General of the Household (虎賁中郎將)
- In office ? – 243
- Monarch: Liu Shan

Gentleman of the Yellow Gate (黃門侍郎)
- In office 223 – ?
- Monarch: Liu Shan
- Chancellor: Zhuge Liang

Personal details
- Born: Unknown Zhijiang, Hubei
- Died: 246 Chengdu, Sichuan
- Parent: Dong He (father)
- Occupation: General, politician
- Courtesy name: Xiuzhao (休昭)

Dong Yun (died c.December 246 (Note: The Chronicles of Huayang indicated that both Jiang Wan and Dong Yun died in the 11th month of the 9th year of the Yanxi era of Liu Shan's reign. This month corresponds to 26 Nov to 25 Dec 246 in the Gregorian calendar.)), courtesy name Xiuzhao, was a Chinese general and politician of the state of Shu Han during the Three Kingdoms period of China. His father, Dong He, also served as an official in Shu. Dong Yun was one of four persons who held positions equivalent to a head of government in Shu from 221 to 253; the other three were Zhuge Liang, Jiang Wan and Fei Yi.

== Family background ==
Dong Yun's ancestors were originally from Jiangzhou (江州; in present-day Chongqing), but they migrated to Zhijiang County (枝江縣) in Nan Commandery (南郡), which is present-day Zhijiang, Hubei, and designated Zhijiang as their ancestral home.

Dong Yun's father, Dong He, previously served as an official under Liu Zhang, the Governor of Yi Province (covering present-day Sichuan and Chongqing), during the late Eastern Han dynasty before switching allegiance to Liu Bei, the founding emperor of the state of Shu during the Three Kingdoms period.

== As an attendant to the crown prince ==
In 221, after Liu Bei named his son Liu Shan as his crown prince, he appointed Dong Yun as an attendant to the newly anointed heir apparent.

== Earning praise from Zhuge Liang ==
After Liu Shan became emperor of Shu in 223 following his father's death, he appointed Dong Yun as a Gentleman of the Yellow Gate (黃門侍郎).

In 227, Zhuge Liang, the Imperial Chancellor of Shu, mobilised military forces from throughout Shu in preparation for a large-scale campaign against Shu's rival state Wei in the following year. As the troops gathered at the staging area in Hanzhong Commandery, Zhuge Liang was worried that Liu Shan was still young and not mature enough to make good judgments. He thus decided to put Dong Yun in charge of internal affairs in the Shu capital Chengdu because he believed that Dong Yun would perform his duties in a professional and impartial manner.

In his Chu Shi Biao (literally "memorial on the case to go to war"), Zhuge Liang named Dong Yun, Fei Yi and Guo Youzhi as examples of trustworthy, loyal and competent officials who could provide good advice and assist Liu Shan in governing Shu more effectively.

== As a Palace Attendant ==
Not long later, Zhuge Liang nominated Dong Yun to serve as Palace Attendant, commissioned him as a General of the Household (中郎將) and put him in command of the huben division of the imperial guards. As his colleague Guo Youzhi, who also held the position of a Palace Attendant, tended to be mild-tempered and non-confrontational when dealing with people, the burden of advising the emperor Liu Shan and speaking up on difficult issues largely rested on Dong Yun's shoulders. Dong Yun performed his duties well and did his best to plan ahead and preempt problems that could possibly arise.

=== Objecting to Liu Shan's plan to expand his harem ===
When Liu Shan wanted to have more concubines, Dong Yun pointed out that his imperial harem was already full and reminded him that according to historical precedent a ruler should have no more than 12 women in his harem. He also firmly refused to carry out the emperor's order to search for more women to join the harem. Liu Shan, unable to get what he wanted, resented and feared Dong Yun.

=== Rejecting a peerage ===
Jiang Wan, the Prefect of the Masters of Writing (尚書令) and Inspector of Yi Province (益州刺史), once wrote a memorial to Liu Shan to express his wish to step down and let Fei Yi and Dong Yun succeed him. He also wrote: "(Dong) Yun has served in the palace for many years and done his best to support and uphold the dynasty. He should be awarded a peerage to honour him for his contributions." However, Dong Yun declined to accept a peerage.

=== Keeping Huang Hao in check ===
As Liu Shan grew older, he started to favour the palace eunuch Huang Hao, who actively fawned on the emperor in a concerted attempt to rise to higher positions and gain greater power in the Shu government. When Dong Yun learnt about this, he openly criticised the emperor for showing favouritism towards Huang Hao and, at the same time, severely reprimanded the eunuch for his behaviour. Huang Hao feared Dong Yun so he did not dare to cause any trouble; he also never made it to any position higher than that of an Assistant of the Yellow Gate (黃門丞) while Dong Yun was still alive.

=== Treating his colleagues with respect ===
On one occasion, when Dong Yun was about to leave his residence for a casual hang-out with his friends Fei Yi, Hu Ji and others, he heard that a junior colleague, Dong Hui (董恢), (Note: Dong Hui (董恢), whose courtesy name was Xiuxu (休緒), was from Xiangyang. He once accompanied Fei Yi on a diplomatic mission to Shu's ally state Wu and met the Wu emperor Sun Quan. Sun Quan, who was drunk at the time, asked Fei Yi: "Yang Yi and Wei Yan behave like immature boys. Even though their contributions are insignificant, they can still cause big trouble because they are in positions of power. If one day Zhuge Liang is no longer around, there will definitely be disaster. All of you are confused. No one has considered the long-term implications of this problem. Isn't that harmful to your descendants?" Fei Yi, stunned by Sun Quan's question, could not respond immediately and started glancing around as he tried to think of an answer. Dong Hui stepped up, looked at Fei Yi and said: "You can say that the conflict between Yang Yi and Wei Yan is a private issue between them. They don't have wild ambitions unlike Ying Bu and Han Xin. As of now, our priority is to eliminate our powerful enemy and reunify the Empire. Only after we have achieved that can we consider our mission accomplished and be able to expand our legacy. If we put our priority aside and focus on preempting internal problems such as this, it would be equivalent to not building a boat at all to avoid getting caught in a storm. That wouldn't be beneficial at all in the longer term." Sun Quan was very amused by Dong Hui's reply. Zhuge Liang agreed with Dong Hui's answer after hearing about it. Within three days after Dong Hui returned to Chengdu, Zhuge Liang employed him as an assistant and later promoted him to serve as the Administrator of Ba Commandery (巴郡太守). Pei Songzhi pointed out a discrepancy between the Xiangyang Qijiu Ji and Han Jin Chunqiu (both were written by Xi Zuochi): the latter recorded that Fei Yi thought of the answer to Sun Quan's question on his own, instead of Dong Hui replying on his behalf. He also noted that Dong Yun's biography in the Sanguozhi recorded that Dong Hui was a "junior official" when he visited Dong Yun, but Dong Hui should not be considered "junior" in any sense since he held the position of a commandery administrator. Pei Songzhi then criticised Xi Zuochi for being careless in his writing because of such contradictions.) had come to visit and consult him. After seeing that Dong Yun already had an appointment and was about to board the carriage, Dong Hui said he would come back again another time and prepared to leave.

Dong Yun stopped him and said: "I am just hanging out with my friends. I think you made a trip here to share some brilliant ideas with me. It would be rude of me to ignore you just so that i can go out with my friends." He then got off the carriage. Fei Yi and the others also cancelled their hang-out. Dong Yun earned praise for his courteous and respectful attitude towards his colleagues and people of talent.

== As Prefect of the Masters of Writing ==
Dong Yun was given the additional appointment of General Who Assists the State (輔國將軍) in 243. In the following year, he was promoted to the position of Prefect of the Masters of Writing (尚書令) while concurrently holding the appointment of Palace Attendant. He also served as a deputy to Fei Yi, who held the position of General-in-Chief (大將軍).

== Death and legacy ==
Dong Yun died in 246. At the time, the people of Shu named Zhuge Liang, Jiang Wan, Fei Yi and Dong Yun as the four heroic chancellors of their state.

After Dong Yun's death, Chen Zhi, whom the Shu emperor Liu Shan favoured, replaced him as Palace Attendant. Chen Zhi then formed an alliance with the eunuch Huang Hao to dominate the political scene in Shu. Both of them shared power until Chen Zhi died in 258, leaving Huang Hao solely in control. Since Chen Zhi became one of his most favoured officials, Liu Shan gradually began to resent Dong Yun and see him as "arrogant and disrespectful". Chen Zhi and Huang Hao also often spoke ill of Dong Yun in front of Liu Shan and make the emperor hate Dong Yun even more. Dong Yun's death marked the beginning of Huang Hao's rise to power and a trend of increasing corruption in the Shu government. The people of Shu longed to return to the times when Dong Yun was in power.

== Descendants ==
Dong Yun's grandson, Dong Hong (董宏), served as the Administrator of Baxi Commandery during the Jin dynasty.

== Appraisal ==
Chen Shou, who wrote Dong Yun's biography in the Records of the Three Kingdoms (Sanguozhi), appraised Dong Yun as follows: "Dong Yun rectified his lord when he was in the wrong and righteousness was manifested in his countenance... Along with Dong He, Liu Ba, Ma Liang and Chen Zhen, he was one of the best officials in Shu."

== See also ==
- Lists of people of the Three Kingdoms
