= Empress Wu (Zhaolie) =

Empress of Shu Han from 221 to 223

Empress Wu 吳皇后

Empress dowager of Shu Han
- Tenure: 16 June 223 – September or October 245

Empress consort of Shu Han
- Tenure: 19 June 221 – 16 June 223
- Successor: Empress Jing'ai
- Born: Unknown; Kaifeng, Henan
- Died: September or October 245 (Note: Liu Shan's biography in the Sanguozhi recorded that Empress Dowager Wu died in the 8th month of the 8th year of the Yanxi era of Liu Shan's reign. This month corresponds to 9 September to 8 October 245 in the Gregorian calendar.)
- Spouse: Liu Mao; Liu Bei
Posthumous name
- Empress Mu (穆皇后)

Empress Wu (died September or October 245), personal name Wu Xian (Chinese: 吳莧), formally known as Empress Mu (literally "the Just Empress"), was an empress of the state of Shu Han during the Three Kingdoms period. She was the last wife and the only empress of Liu Bei, the founding emperor of Shu Han, and a younger sister of Wu Yi.

== Life ==
Lady Wu was from Chenliu Commandery (陳留郡), which is around present-day Kaifeng, Henan. She was born sometime in the late Eastern Han dynasty. She had an elder brother, Wu Yi (吴懿). The siblings lost their father at a young age. However her father, whose name is not recorded in history, was a friend of Liu Yan, therefore Lady Wu followed him into Yi Province (covering present-day Sichuan and Chongqing) when Liu Yan was made the governor in 188. Liu Yan had imperial ambition and knew that a physiognomist once assessed that Lady Wu would rise to high nobility. Because of this prediction and due to the friendship between her father and Liu Yan, she was married to Liu Yan's son Liu Mao (劉瑁) who accompanied him. After Liu Mao's death, she did not remarry. (Note: Liu Mao died between late 208 and 214. There is ambiguity in the birth order of Liu Zhang and Liu Mao in Sanguozhi. In Liu Yan's biography, Liu Mao was recorded as being Liu Yan's youngest son. However, in Liu Zhang's biography, Liu Mao became Liu Zhang's elder brother.)

When Liu Bei seized Yi Province from Lady Wu's brother-in-law Liu Zhang in 214, he had been effectively divorced from his wife Lady Sun, the younger sister of Sun Quan. Many of Liu Bei's subordinates encouraged him to take Lady Wu as his wife. However, he was hesitant because Liu Mao and he were of the same clan. In order to convince Liu Bei, Fa Zheng reminded Liu that Duke Wen of Jin was betrothed to Huai Ying, even though he was the brother of her previous husband, Duke Huai of Jin. Therefore, Liu Bei agreed and he married Lady Wu.

Xi Zuochi disapproved of Liu Bei's decision; he commented: "Human relations begin with the marriage between two individuals, it is the socle of a ruler's influence. The common people must abide to the ancestral customs, even more for someone who wishes to act as their ruler. Duke Wen of Jin abolished those customs and used his personal power to serve his career. Therefore, Hu Yan rightfully chastised him. This was not without reason, for he violated the common rule. In Liu Bei's situation, he wasn't forced to be so quick in his decision. Yet his subordinate, by mentioning a previous fault as an example, didn't serve his ruler the way ancient customs teach us. Liu Bei, in following his advice, made a mistake."

When he claimed for himself the title of the "Prince of Hanzhong" in 219, he made Lady Wu his queen consort. After the fall of the Eastern Han dynasty in late 220 (with Emperor Xian's abdication to Cao Pi), Liu Bei claimed for himself the Han imperial title in 221, establishing Shu. Later that year, he made her empress. After his death in 223, his son and successor Liu Shan honoured her as empress dowager. She died in 245 and was buried at Huiling along with Liu Bei in the imperial tomb. However the Records of the Three Kingdoms is inconsistent in stating whether she, or Liu Shan's mother Lady Gan, was buried with Liu Bei. (Note: Lady Gan's biography also state that she was buried with Liu Bei. It is possible that both were buried with Liu Bei.)

== See also ==
- Shu Han family trees
- Lists of people of the Three Kingdoms

== Notes ==
Chinese royalty
New dynasty	Empress of Shu Han; 221–223	Succeeded by Empress Jing'ai
Preceded by Empress Cao Jie of the Eastern Han dynasty	Empress of China (Southwestern); 221–223	Succeeded by Empress Jing'ai
