= White eyebrows =

White eyebrows may refer to:

- As the fables and phrases, it means that White eyebrows is the greatest one among others.
- Ma Liang (馬良), an advisor to the powerful warlord Liu Bei during the Three Kingdoms era of China.
- Bak Mei (白眉), one of the legendary Five Elders of China.
- Pai Mei, a character who is in the Hollywood film Kill Bill.
