= Records of the Three Kingdoms =

Chinese official history (c. 290 CE)

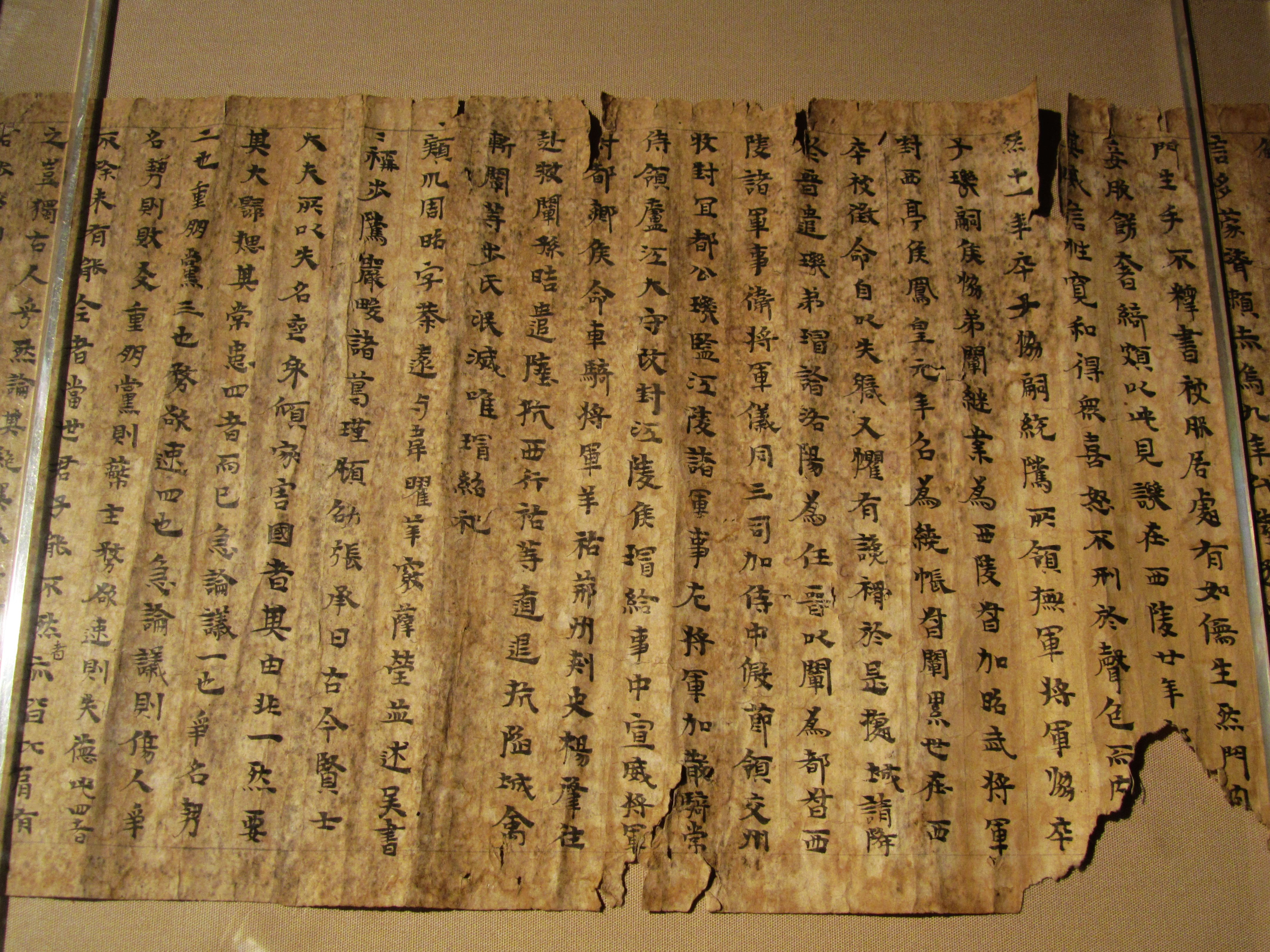
- A fragment of the biography of Bu Zhi from the Records of the Three Kingdoms, part of the Dunhuang manuscripts
- Author: Chen Shou
- Original title: 三國志
- Language: Classical Chinese
- Publication date: 280s or 290s
- Publication place: China

Records of the Three Kingdoms

Chinese name
- Traditional Chinese: 三國志
- Simplified Chinese: 三国志
Transcriptions
Standard Mandarin
- Hanyu Pinyin: Sānguó zhì
- Bopomofo: ㄙㄢ ㄍㄨㄛˊ ㄓˋ
- Wade–Giles: San^{1}-kuo^{2} Chih^{4}
- IPA: [sán kwǒ ʈʂɨ̂]
Yue: Cantonese
- Yale Romanization: Sāam gwok ji
- Jyutping: Saam1 gwok3 zi3
Southern Min
- Hokkien POJ: Sam-kok-chì
- Tâi-lô: Sam-kok-tsì

Vietnamese name
- Vietnamese: Tam quốc chí
- Hán-Nôm: 三國志

Korean name
- Hangul: 삼국지
- Hanja: 三國志
Transcriptions
- Revised Romanization: Samgukji

Japanese name
- Kyūjitai: 三國志
- Shinjitai: 三国志
Transcriptions
- Romanization: Sangokushi

The Records of the Three Kingdoms is a Chinese official history compiled by Chen Shou in the late 3rd century. It covers the end of the Han dynasty and the histories of Cao Wei, Shu Han, and Eastern Wu through the reunification of China under the Western Jin. The work has 65 volumes divided into the Book of Wei, Book of Shu, and Book of Wu, and is organized mainly as biographies.

Chen Shou drew on earlier official histories of Wei and Wu and collected surviving materials for Shu, which had no comparable official history. In the 5th century, Pei Songzhi added extensive annotations that preserved alternative accounts, quoted lost works, and commented on discrepancies in the text. The Records and Pei's annotations are major sources for the political and military history of the late Han and Three Kingdoms periods.

The work also supplied much of the historical framework for the 14th-century novel Romance of the Three Kingdoms. Large portions have been translated into English, but no complete unabridged English translation has been published.

== Origin and structure ==
The Book of Han and Records of the Three Kingdoms join the original Han-era universal history Records of the Grand Historian to constitute the first three entries in the Twenty-Four Histories canon, with each work cementing the new genre's literary and historiographical qualities as established by Sima Qian. The Records of the Three Kingdoms consist of 65 fascicles divided into three books—one per eponymous kingdom—totaling around 360,000 Chinese characters in length. The Book of Wei, Book of Shu, and Book of Wu receive 30 fascicles, 15 fascicles, and 20 fascicles respectively. Each fascicle is organised in the form of one or more biographies.

The author Chen Shou was born in present-day Nanchong, Sichuan, then in the state of Shu Han. After the Conquest of Shu by Wei in 263, he became an official historian under the government of the Jin dynasty, and created a history of the Three Kingdoms period. After the Conquest of Wu by Jin in 280, his work received the acclaim of senior minister Zhang Hua.

Prior to the Jin dynasty, both the states of Cao Wei and Wu had already composed their own official histories: the Book of Wei by Wang Chen, Xun Yi, and Ruan Ji; and the Book of Wu by Wei Zhao, Hua He, Xue Ying, Zhou Zhao (周昭), and Liang Guang (梁廣). Additionally, Yu Huan had completed his privately compiled history of Wei, the Weilüe. Chen Shou used these texts as the foundation of the Records of the Three Kingdoms. However, since the state of Shu lacked an official history bureau, the Book of Shu in the Records was composed by Chen Shou himself based on his earlier personal notes about events in Shu and other primary sources he collected, such as his previously compiled writings of Zhuge Liang.

The Records of the Three Kingdoms used the year 220 CE—when the last emperor of the Han dynasty was forced to abdicate to Cao Pi—as the year in which the Wei dynasty was established. The Records refer to the rulers of Wei as 'Emperors' and those of Shu and Wu as 'Lords' or by their personal names.

== Dates ==
Due to the biographical rather than primarily annalistic arrangement of the work, assigning dates to the historical content is both imprecise and non-trivial. Certain fascicles contain background information about their subjects' forebears which date back centuries before the main record. For example, the biography of Liu Yan begins with discussing his ancestor Liu Yu's enfeoffment at Jingling (present-day Tianmen, Hubei) in around 85 CE. The first event to receive detailed description throughout the work is the Yellow Turban Rebellion in 184. Many biographies make passing mention of the event, but more concrete information such as correspondence and troop movements during the uprising can be found in fragmentary form in at least four fascicles: the biographies of Cheng Yu, Yu Jin, Liu Bei, and Sun Jian.

The three books in the Records of the Three Kingdoms end at different dates, with the main section of the Book of Wei ending with the abdication of Cao Huan in February 266, the Book of Shu ending with the death of Liu Shan in 271, and the Book of Wu ending with the death of Sun Hao in 284.

One abstract regarding the chronology is translated as follows:

In the 24th year (of Jian'an), the Former Lord became the King of Hanzhong, and he appointed (Guan) Yu as the General of the Vanguard. In the same year, (Guan) Yu led his men to attack Cao Ren at Fan. Lord Cao sent Yu Jin to aid (Cao) Ren. In autumn, great rains caused the Han River to flood. (Yu) Jin and all seven armies he oversaw were inundated.

== Contents ==
=== Book of Wei (魏書) ===
#	Title	Translation	Notes
Fascicle 1	武帝紀	Annals of Emperor Wu	Cao Cao
Fascicle 2	文帝紀	Annals of Emperor Wen	Cao Pi
Fascicle 3	明帝紀	Annals of Emperor Ming	Cao Rui
Fascicle 4	三少帝紀	Annals of the three young emperors	Cao Fang, Cao Mao, Cao Huan
Fascicle 5	后妃傳	Biographies of empresses and concubines	Lady Bian, Lady Zhen, Guo Nüwang, Empress Mao, Empress Guo
Fascicle 6	董二袁劉傳	Biographies of Dong, the two Yuans, and Liu	Dong Zhuo, Yuan Shao, Yuan Shu, Liu Biao
Fascicle 7	呂布臧洪傳	Biographies of Lü Bu and Zang Hong	Zhang Miao, Chen Deng
Fascicle 8	二公孫陶四張傳	Biographies of the two Gongsuns, Tao, and the four Zhangs	Gongsun Zan, Tao Qian, Zhang Yang, Gongsun Du, Zhang Yan, Zhang Xiu, Zhang Lu
Fascicle 9	諸夏侯曹傳	Biographies of the Xiahous and Caos	Xiahou Dun, Han Hao, Xiahou Yuan, Cao Ren, Cao Chun, Cao Hong, Cao Xiu, Cao Zhen, Cao Shuang, Xiahou Shang, Xiahou Xuan
Fascicle 10	荀彧荀攸賈詡傳	Biographies of Xun Yu, Xun You, and Jia Xu	
Fascicle 11	袁張涼國田王邴管傳	Biographies of Yuan, Zhang, Liang, Guo, Tian, Wang, Bing, and Guan	Yuan Huan, Zhang Fan, Zhang Cheng, Liang Mao, Guo Yuan, Tian Chou, Wang Xiu, Bing Yuan, Guan Ning
Fascicle 12	崔毛徐何邢司馬傳	Biographies of Cui, Mao, Xu, He, Xing, and Sima	Cui Yan, Mao Jie, Xu Yi, He Kui, Xing Yong, Bao Xun, Sima Zhi
Fascicle 13	鍾繇華歆王朗傳	Biographies of Zhong Yao, Hua Xin, and Wang Lang	Zhong Yu, Wang Su
Fascicle 14	程郭董劉蔣劉傳	Biographies of Cheng, Dong, Guo, Liu, Jiang, and Liu	Cheng Yu, Cheng Xiao, Guo Jia, Dong Zhao, Liu Ye, Jiang Ji, Liu Fang
Fascicle 15	劉司馬梁張溫賈傳	Biographies of Liu, Sima, Liang, Zhang, Wen, and Jia	Liu Fu, Liu Jing, Sima Lang, Liang Xi, Zhang Ji (Derong), Zhang Ji (Jingzhong), Wen Hui, Jia Kui
Fascicle 16	任蘇杜鄭倉傳	Biographies of Ren, Su, Du, Zheng, and Cang	Ren Jun, Su Ze, Du Ji, Zheng Hun, Cang Ci
Fascicle 17	張樂于張徐傳	Biographies of Zhang, Yue, Yu, Zhang, and Xu	Zhang Liao, Yue Jin, Yu Jin, Zhang He, Xu Huang
Fascicle 18	二李臧文呂許典二龐閻傳	Biographies of the two Lis, Zang, Wen, Lü, Xu, Dian, the two Pangs, and Yan	Li Dian, Li Tong, Zang Ba, Wen Ping, Lü Qian, Xu Chu, Dian Wei, Pang De, Pang Yu, Yan Wen
Fascicle 19	任城陳蕭王傳	Biographies of the princes of Rencheng, Chen, and Xiao	Cao Zhang, Cao Zhi, Cao Xiong
Fascicle 20	武文世王公傳	Biographies of nobles in Emperors Wu and Wen's time	Cao Ang, Cao Shuo, Cao Chong, Cao Ju (Prince of Pengcheng), Cao Yu, Cao Lin (Prince of Pei), Cao Gun, Cao Xuan, Cao Jun (Prince of Chenliu), Cao Ju (Prince of Fanyang), Cao Gan, Cao Zishang, Cao Biao, Cao Ziqin, Cao Zicheng, Cao Zizheng, Cao Zijing, Cao Jun (Duke of Fan), Cao Ziji, Cao Hui, Cao Mao (Prince of Laoling), Cao Xie, Cao Rui (Prince of Beihai), Cao Jian, Cao Lin (Prince of Donghai), Cao Li, Cao Yong, Cao Gong, Cao Yan
Fascicle 21	王衛二劉傳	Biographies of Wang, Wei, and the two Lius	Wang Can, Wei Ji, Liu Yi, Liu Shao, Fu Gu
Fascicle 22	桓二陳徐衛盧傳	Biographies of Huan, the two Chens, Xu, Wei, and Lu	Huan Jie, Chen Qun, Chen Tai, Chen Jiao, Xu Xuan, Wei Zhen, Lu Yu
Fascicle 23	和常楊杜趙裴傳	Biographies of He, Chang, Yang, Du, Zhao, and Pei	He Qia, Chang Lin, Yang Jun, Du Xi, Zhao Yan, Pei Qian
Fascicle 24	韓崔高孫王傳	Biographies of Han, Cui, Gao, Sun, and Wang	Han Ji, Cui Lin, Gao Rou, Sun Li, Wang Guan
Fascicle 25	辛毗楊阜高堂隆傳	Biographies of Xin Pi, Yang Fu, and Gaotang Long	
Fascicle 26	滿田牽郭傳	Biographies of Man, Tian, Qian, and Guo	Man Chong, Tian Yu, Qian Zhao, Guo Huai
Fascicle 27	徐胡二王傳	Biographies of Xu, Hu, and the two Wangs	Xu Miao, Hu Zhi, Wang Chang, Wang Ji
Fascicle 28	王毌丘諸葛鄧鍾傳	Biographies of Wang, Guanqiu, Zhuge, Deng and Zhong	Wang Ling, Guanqiu Jian, Zhuge Dan, Deng Ai, Zhong Hui
Fascicle 29	方技傳	Biographies of fangshi and artisans	Hua Tuo, Du Kui, Zhu Jianping, Zhou Xuan, Guan Lu
Fascicle 30	烏丸鮮卑東夷傳	Biographies of the Wuhuan, Xianbei, and Dongyi	Wuhuan, Xianbei, Buyeo, Goguryeo, Okjeo, Yilou, Yemaek, Samhan, Wa (Wajinden); and a long footnote at the end containing the chapter on the Xirong, or 'Peoples of the West' from the Weilüe, or "Brief Account of the Wei Dynasty", composed by Yu Huan in the second third of the 3rd century CE.

=== Book of Shu (蜀書) ===
#	Title	Translation	Notes
Fascicle 31	劉二牧傳	Biographies of the two Governor Lius	Liu Yan, Liu Zhang
Fascicle 32	先主傳	Biography of the Former Lord	Liu Bei
Fascicle 33	後主傳	Biography of the Later Lord	Liu Shan
Fascicle 34	二主妃子傳	Biographies of concubines and sons of the two Lords	Lady Gan, Empress Wu, Empress Zhang (former), Empress Zhang (later), Liu Yong, Liu Li, Liu Xuan
Fascicle 35	諸葛亮傳	Biography of Zhuge Liang	Zhuge Qiao, Zhuge Zhan, Dong Jue
Fascicle 36	關張馬黃趙傳	Biographies of Guan, Zhang, Ma, Huang, and Zhao	Guan Yu, Zhang Fei, Ma Chao, Huang Zhong, Zhao Yun
Fascicle 37	龐統法正傳	Biographies of Pang Tong and Fa Zheng	
Fascicle 38	許麋孫簡伊秦傳	Biographies of Xu, Mi, Sun, Jian, Yi, and Qin	Xu Jing, Mi Zhu, Mi Fang, Sun Qian, Jian Yong, Yi Ji, Qin Mi
Fascicle 39	董劉馬陳董呂傳	Biographies of Dong, Liu, Ma, Chen, Dong, and Lü	Dong He, Liu Ba, Ma Liang, Ma Su, Chen Zhen, Dong Yun, Chen Zhi, Huang Hao, Lü Yi
Fascicle 40	劉彭廖李劉魏楊傳	Biographies of Liu, Peng, Liao, Li, Liu, Wei, and Yang	Liu Feng, Peng Yang, Liao Li, Li Yan, Liu Yan, Wei Yan, Yang Yi
Fascicle 41	霍王向張楊費傳	Biographies of Huo, Wang, Xiang, Zhang, Yang, and Fei	Huo Jun, Huo Yi, Wang Lian, Xiang Lang, Xiang Chong, Zhang Yi, Yang Hong, Fei Shi
Fascicle 42	杜周杜許孟來尹李譙郤傳	Biographies of Du, Zhou, Du, Xu, Meng, Lai, Yin, Li, Qiao, and Xi	Du Wei, Zhou Qun, Zhang Yu, Du Qiong, Xu Ci, Hu Qian, Meng Guang, Lai Min, Yin Mo, Li Zhuan, Qiao Zhou, Xi Zheng
Fascicle 43	黃李呂馬王張傳	Biographies of Huang, Li, Lü, Ma, Wang, and Zhang	Huang Quan, Li Hui, Lü Kai, Ma Zhong, Wang Ping, Zhang Ni
Fascicle 44	蔣琬費禕姜維傳	Biographies of Jiang Wan, Fei Yi, and Jiang Wei	
Fascicle 45	鄧張宗楊傳	Biographies of Deng, Zhang, Zong, and Yang	Deng Zhi, Zhang Yi, Zong Yu, Liao Hua, Yang Xi

=== Book of Wu (吳書) ===
#	Title	Translation	Notes
Fascicle 46	孫破虜討逆傳	Biographies of Sun Who Destroys Barbarians, and Sun Who Attacks Rebels	Sun Jian, Sun Ce
Fascicle 47	吳主傳	Biography of the Lord of Wu	Sun Quan
Fascicle 48	三嗣主傳	Biographies of the three heirs	Sun Liang, Sun Xiu, Sun Hao
Fascicle 49	劉繇太史慈士燮傳	Biographies of Liu Yao, Taishi Ci, and Shi Xie	Ze Rong, Liu Ji
Fascicle 50	妃嬪傳	Biographies of concubines and ladies	Lady Wu, Wu Jing, Lady Xie, Lady Xu, Bu Lianshi, Empress Dayi, Empress Jinghuai, Empress Pan, Quan Huijie, Empress Zhu, Empress Dowager He, Teng Fanglan
Fascicle 51	宗室傳	Biographies of nobles	Sun Jing, Sun Yu, Sun Jiao, Sun Huan, Sun Ben, Sun Fu, Sun Yi, Sun Kuang, Sun Shao, Sun Huan
Fascicle 52	張顧諸葛步傳	Biographies of Zhang, Gu, Zhuge, and Bu	Zhang Zhao, Zhang Cheng, Zhang Xiu, Gu Yong, Gu Shao, Gu Tan, Gu Cheng, Zhuge Jin, Bu Zhi
Fascicle 53	張嚴程闞薛傳	Biographies of Zhang, Yan, Cheng, Kan, and Xue	Zhang Hong, Yan Jun, Cheng Bing, Kan Ze, Xue Zong
Fascicle 54	周瑜魯肅呂蒙傳	Biographies of Zhou Yu, Lu Su, and Lü Meng	
Fascicle 55	程黃韓蔣周陳董甘淩徐潘丁傳	Biographies of Cheng, Huang, Han, Jiang, Zhou, Chen, Dong, Gan, Ling, Xu, Pan, and Ding	Cheng Pu, Huang Gai, Han Dang, Jiang Qin, Zhou Tai, Chen Wu, Dong Xi, Gan Ning, Ling Tong, Xu Sheng, Pan Zhang, Ding Feng
Fascicle 56	朱治朱然呂範朱桓傳	Biographies of Zhu Zhi, Zhu Ran, Lü Fan, and Zhu Huan	Shi Ji, Zhu Yi
Fascicle 57	虞陸張駱陸吾朱傳	Biographies of Yu, Lu, Zhang, Luo, Lu, Wu, and Zhu	Yu Fan, Lu Ji, Zhang Wen, Luo Tong, Lu Mao, Wu Can, Zhu Ju
Fascicle 58	陸遜傳	Biography of Lu Xun	Lu Kang
Fascicle 59	吳主五子傳	Biographies of the five sons of the Lord of Wu	Sun Deng, Sun Lü, Sun He, Sun Ba, Sun Fen
Fascicle 60	賀全呂周鍾離傳	Biographies of He, Quan, Lü, Zhou, and Zhongli	He Qi, Quan Cong, Lü Dai, Zhou Fang, Zhongli Mu
Fascicle 61	潘濬陸凱傳	Biographies of Pan Jun and Lu Kai	
Fascicle 62	是儀胡綜傳	Biographies of Shi Yi and Hu Zong	
Fascicle 63	吳範劉惇趙達傳	Biographies of Wu Fan, Liu Dun, and Zhao Da	
Fascicle 64	諸葛滕二孫濮陽傳	Biographies of Zhuge, Teng, the two Suns, and Puyang	Zhuge Ke, Teng Yin, Sun Jun, Sun Chen, Puyang Xing
Fascicle 65	王樓賀韋華傳	Biographies of Wang, Lou, He, Wei, and Hua	Wang Fan, Lou Xuan, He Shao, Wei Zhao, Hua He

== Annotations ==
During the fifth century, the Liu Song dynasty historian Pei Songzhi (372–451) extensively annotated Chen Shou's Records of the Three Kingdoms using a variety of other sources, augmenting the text to twice the length of the original. This work, completed in 429, became one of the official histories of the Three Kingdoms period, under the title Sanguozhi zhu (三国志注, zhu meaning "notes"). Bibliographical records indicate that up until Pei's own Liu Song dynasty, Chen Shou's three books had circulated individually rather than as a single work.

Pei collected other records to add information he felt should be added. He provided detailed explanations to some of the geography and other elements mentioned in the original. He also included multiple accounts of the same events. Sometimes, the accounts he added contradicted each other, but he included them anyway since he could not decide which version was the correct one. If Pei added something that sounded wrong, he would make a note or even offer a correction. In regard to historical events and figures, as well as Chen Shou's original text, he added his own commentary. Crucially, he cited his sources in almost every case.

== Legacy ==
The Records of the Three Kingdoms was the main source of inspiration for the 14th century Romance of the Three Kingdoms, one of the four great Classic Chinese Novels. As such the records is considered one of the most influential historical and cultural texts in Chinese history. In addition, the records provide one of the earliest accounts of Korea and Japan. Chen's Records set the standard for how Korea and Japan would write their official histories as well.

=== Influence on Asia ===
Chen's Records is the chronologically final text of the "Four Histories" (四史), which together influenced and served as a model for Korean and Japanese official histories.

The Records are important to the research of early Korean (삼국지 Samguk ji) and Japanese history (三国志, Sangokushi). It provides, among other things, the first detailed account of Korean and Japanese societies such as Goguryeo, Yemaek and Wa. The passages in Fascicle 30 about the Wa, where the Yamatai-koku and its ruler Queen Himiko are recorded, are referred to as the Wajinden in Japanese studies. The Japanese did not have their own records until more than three centuries later, with the earliest extant native record being the Kojiki of 712.

=== Romance of the Three Kingdoms ===
The text forms the foundation on which the 14th-century novel Romance of the Three Kingdoms by Luo Guanzhong is based. In addition, Chen Shou's literary style and vivid portrayal of characters have been a source of influence for the novel.

The Records include biographies of historical figures such as Cao Cao and Guan Yu who feature prominently in the Romance of the Three Kingdoms, though the Romance also includes a number of characters and stories that are fictional. However, most of the historical facts were drawn from Chen's Records.

== Translations ==
The Records of the Three Kingdoms has not been fully translated into English. William Gordon Crowell alludes to a project to translate Chen Shou's work with Pei Songzhi's commentary in full, but it was apparently discontinued. Parts of that project are published by Robert Joe Cutter and William Gordon Crowell under the title Empresses and Consorts: Selections from Chen Shou's Records of the Three States With Pei Songzhi's Commentary (University of Hawaii Press, 1999), which includes the translations for fascicles 5, 34, and 50.

Other translations include Kenneth J. Dewoskin's Doctors Diviners and Magicians of Ancient China: Biographies of Fang-Shih (Columbia University Press, 1983), which includes a full translation of fascicle 29. Rafe de Crespigny, in addition to his translation of Sun Jian's biography (Fascicle 46), also translated excerpts of the Records of the Three Kingdoms in his translation of the Zizhi Tongjian that deals with the last years of the Han dynasty, as does Achilles Fang, who translated the Zizhi Tongjian fascicles that deal with the Three Kingdoms period proper. The Zizhi Tongjian fascicles in question draw heavily from Records of the Three Kingdoms. Further excerpts of the Records can be found in various sourcebooks dealing with East Asian history.

Below is a table containing the known English translations of the Records of the Three Kingdoms that have been published in academia:

Fascicle	Title of translation	Translator(s)	Publish year	URL/page numbers	Notes
5 (Wei 5)	Empresses and Consorts: Selections from Chen Shou's Records of the Three States With Pei Songzhi's Commentary	Robert Joe Cutter and William Gordon Crowell	1999	pp. 89–114	Lady Bian, Lady Zhen, Guo Nüwang, Empress Mao, Empress Guo
8 (Wei 8)	Chinese Civilization: A Sourcebook, 2nd Ed	Patricia Buckley Ebrey	2009	pp.84–5	The section titled "Heterodox Bandits" is an unannotated translation of the Dianlüe footnote of the Zhang Lu chapter, about Zhang Xiu (張脩)
9 (Wei 9)	Early Medieval China: A Sourcebook	Timothy M. Davis	2013	pp. 135–46	Translation of the correspondence between Xiahou Xuan and Sima Yi from the biography of Xiahou Xuan
29 (Wei 29)	Doctors Diviners and Magicians of Ancient China: Biographies of Fang-Shih	Kenneth J. Dewoskin	1983	Entire book	Hua Tuo, Du Kui, Zhu Jianping, Zhou Xuan, Guan Lu
29 (Wei 29)	"The Biography of Hua-t'o from the History of the Three Kingdoms" in The Columbia Anthology of Traditional Chinese Literature	Victor H. Mair	1994	pp. 688–696	Hua Tuo
30 (Wei 30)	Sourcebook of Korean Civilization: Volume One: From Early Times to the 16th Century	Michael C. Rogers	1993	pp.13–24	Buyeo, Goguryeo, Okjeo, Yemaek, Samhan (abridged, Yilou omitted)
30 (Wei 30)	"Chinese Accounts of Koguryŏ and its Neighbours" in The Review of Korean Studies, Volume 15 Number 2	Kenneth H. J. Gardiner	2012	pp. 91–113	Buyeo, Goguryeo, Okjeo
30 (Wei 30)	"The Account of the Han in the Sanguozhi—An Annotated Translation" in Early Korea Vol. 2 (The Samhan Period in Korean History)	Mark E. Byington	2009	pp. 125–52	Samhan
30 (Wei 30)	Japan in the Chinese dynastic histories: Later Han through Ming dynasties	Ryūsaku Tsunoda and Luther Carrington Goodrich	1951	pp. 8–16	Wa (Japan) only (Wajinden)
30 (Wei 30)	Himiko and Japan's Elusive Chiefdom of Yamatai: Archaeology, History, and Mythology	J. Edward Kidder Jr.	2007	pp. 12–18	Wa (Japan) only (Wajinden)
30 (Wei 30)	Treatise on the People of Wa in the Chronicle of the Kingdom of Wei: The World's Earliest Written Text on Japan	Arikiyo Saeki and Joshua A. Fogel	2018	Entire book	Wa (Japan) only (Wajinden)
30 (Wei 30)	The Peoples of the West from the Weilüe 魏略 by Yu Huan 魚豢: A Third Century Chinese Account Composed between 239 and 265 CE.	John E. Hill	2004		Translation of the long Xirong footnote from the Weilüe, includes descriptions of the Western Regions including Rome
31 (Shu 1)	Record of The Three Kingdoms: The History of Shu – Fascicle One: "The Two Shepherds Liu"	William Gordon Crowell	2005		Liu Yan, Liu Zhang
32 (Shu 2)	Record of The Three Kingdoms: The History of Shu – Fascicle Two: "The Former Lord"	William Gordon Crowell	2006		Liu Bei
34 (Shu 4)	Empresses and Consorts: Selections from Chen Shou's Records of the Three States With Pei Songzhi's Commentary	Robert Joe Cutter and William Gordon Crowell	1999	pp. 115–21	Lady Gan, Empress Wu, Empress Zhang (former), Empress Zhang (later), Liu Yong, Liu Li, Liu Xuan
35 (Shu 5)	Zhuge Liang: Strategy, Achievements, and Writings	Ralph D. Sawyer	2014		Zhuge Liang (partial translation)
39 (Shu 9)	Record of The Three Kingdoms: The History of Shu – Fascicle Nine: Biographies of Dong He, Liu Ba, Ma Liang, Chen Zhen, Dong Yun, and Lü Yi	William Gordon Crowell	2006		Dong He, Liu Ba, Ma Liang, Ma Su, Chen Zhen, Dong Yun, Chen Zhi, Lü Yi
42 (Shu 12)	Sanguo Zhi Fascicle 42: The Biography of Qiao Zhou	J. Michael Farmer	2017		Qiao Zhou only
46 (Wu 1)	The Biography of Sun Chien: Being an Annotated Translation of Pages 1 to 8a of Chüan 46 of the San-kuo Chih of Ch'en Shou in the Po-na Edition	Rafe de Crespigny	1966	Entire book	Sun Jian only
49 (Wu 4)	Men of Hu, Men of Han, Men of the hundred man: the biography of Sī Nhiêp and the conceptualization of early Vietnamese society	Stephen O'Harrow	1986	pp. 259–65	Shi Xie only
50 (Wu 5)	Empresses and Consorts: Selections from Chen Shou's Records of the Three States With Pei Songzhi's Commentary	Robert Joe Cutter and William Gordon Crowell	1999	pp. 122–36	Lady Wu, Wu Jing, Lady Xie, Lady Xu, Bu Lianshi, Empress Dayi, Empress Jinghuai, Empress Pan, Quan Huijie, Empress Zhu, Empress Dowager He, Teng Fanglan

== See also ==
- Lists of people of the Three Kingdoms
- Timeline of the Three Kingdoms period
- Military history of the Three Kingdoms
