= Liu Ba (Three Kingdoms) =

Chinese politician and official (died 222)

- 劉巴

Prefect of the Masters of Writing (尚書令)
- In office 220 – 222
- Monarch: Liu Bei
- Preceded by: Fa Zheng

Master of Writing (尚書)
- In office 219 – 220
- Monarch: Liu Bei

Personal details
- Born: Unknown (Note: From the chronology of Liu Ba's biography, he was older than 17 when Cao Cao was defeated at Chibi. Thus, his birth year should be before 190.) Shaodong County, Hunan
- Died: 222 Chengdu, Sichuan
- Parent: Liu Xiang (father)
- Relatives: Liu Yao (grandfather)
- Occupation: Official
- Courtesy name: Zichu (子初)
- Other names: Zhang Ba (張巴)

Liu Ba (died 222), courtesy name Zichu, was an official in the state of Shu Han during the Three Kingdoms period of China. He originally served under the warlord Liu Zhang before becoming a subordinate of Liu Bei (the founding emperor of Shu) after Liu Zhang's surrender to Liu Bei in 214. Liu Ba was instrumental in helping Liu Bei reward his subordinates from the treasury without impoverishing the common people after their conquest of Yi Province. Liu Ba also helped write the Shu Ke (蜀科), the legal code of Shu, along with Zhuge Liang, Fa Zheng, Li Yan and Yi Ji. Liu Ba succeeded Fa Zheng as the Prefect of the Masters of Writing in 220 and held office until his death in 222.

== Family background ==
Liu Ba's grandfather, Liu Yao (劉曜) served as the Administrator of Cangwu (蒼梧太守), while his father Liu Xiang (劉祥) was appointed as Administrator of Jiangxia (江夏太守) and General Who Defeats Rebels (盪寇將軍). Around this time, Sun Jian led his troops to defeat Dong Zhuo. As the Administrator of Nanyang (南陽太守) Zhang Zi (張咨) refused to supply Sun with provisions for his army, Sun Jian killed Zhang. Liu Xiang had good relations with Sun Jian, therefore officials and people from Nanyang begrudged Liu Xiang. They raised an army and attacked Liu Xiang. He was defeated and fled. The Governor of Jing Province (荊州牧), Liu Biao also didn't like Liu Xiang; Liu Biao then imprisoned Liu Ba. As Liu Biao wanted a pretext to execute him, Liu Biao would also send to Liu Ba some of Liu Xiang's trusted subordinates, who would pretend that they were going to help Liu Ba escape before Liu Biao executed him. Although this happened several times, Liu Ba didn't fall for the trick and gave them no answer. They informed Liu Biao of the situation who therefore did not kill Liu Ba.

== Early life ==
Liu Ba's was born in Zhengyang County, Lingling Commandery (零陵郡), which is present-day Shaodong County, Hunan. At a young age, he was already famous.

When he reached seventeen years old, Liu Ba was appointed by the commandery to serve as an official. Liu Xian (劉先) wanted to have his sister's son, Zhou Buyi (周不疑) study under Liu Ba. However Liu Ba replied to him : "In my youth, when I lived in the North of Jing. I would travel from one master's home to another and learned "perfect memorization in order to answer any questions" however it isn't enough to have my name so well known. I'm not the same as Yang Zhu able to maintain serenity in all circumstances neither the manner of Mo Di known for attending to the matters of all times. I'm like the southern star Winnow: without substance and useless. You sent me a letter expressing your desire to have your worthy nephew gave up on the beauty of the phoenixes and simurghs only to wander in the world of swallows and sparrows. How would I enlighten him? I am ashamed by "having knowledge but feeling none, being full while seeming to be empty" How could I accomplish this task!"

== Service under Cao Cao ==
Liu Biao repeatedly tried to appoint Liu Ba as a member of his staff and recommended him as a maocai (茂才). However, Liu Ba always refused his requests. In 208, Liu Biao died and Cao Cao led his army to attack Jing province. Liu Bei fled south of the Yangtze with all the nobles and officials of Jing and Chu joining him with the exception of Liu Ba who went north to join Cao Cao. Cao Cao appointed him to his staff.

Thereafter, Cao Cao was defeated at Wulin (烏林). While returning to the north, he wanted to employ Huan Jie with the mission to convince Changsha, Lingling and Guiyang commanderies to submit. However Huan Jie refused and told Cao Cao that he could not match Liu Ba. Liu Ba said to Cao Cao: "Right now, Liu Bei is taking over Jing Province, this is not acceptable." Cao Cao answered "If Liu Bei plans against me then I would go after him with the might of my Six Armies." However, Liu Bei already had the three commanderies subjugated therefore Liu Ba was unable to accomplish his mission and instead moved to the Jiaozhi Province. Liu Bei deeply regretted that Liu Ba didn't join him.

By the time Liu Ba reached Lingling, the commandery already joined Liu Bei. As Jing was under Liu Bei's control, he decided to move back to the south as a way to one day return to the north. He knew that Zhuge Liang was at Lingzheng so he wrote to him : "During my life, I have been forced to go through danger, faced with troubles and hardships. I met many people concerned about virtue and righteousness who wished to follow me, carrying on the intention of Heaven and obeying nature's will. It was not my intention to have them leave their home for a arduous task. If the path is closed and my days here end, I shall entrust my life to the azur sea not looking back again toward Jing Province." Zhuge Liang quickly wrote him back: "Lord Liu Bei's great ability dominates the empire. He occupies Jing Province and none turn their back to his virtue. He is already well aware of the comings and goings of Heaven and man. Why would you go elsewhere?" Liu Ba answered: "I have received an order, came and was unsuccessful for now I'm going back. This is the righteous way. What else are you speaking of?"

== Service under Liu Zhang ==
When Liu Ba reached Jiao province, he changed his surname to Zhang (張). He met the governor of the province Shi Xie however they had a disagreement. Thereafter, he travelled to Zangke Commandery (牂柯郡) for Yi Province. He was imprisoned in a local commandery, with the administrator wanting to kill him. However the registrar (主簿) convinced him that he was not an ordinary person. The registrar then asked to personally escort Liu Ba to the province seat and meet his governor Liu Zhang. Since Liu Zhang's father, Liu Yan was nominated as a xiaolian (civil service candidate) by Liu Ba's father, Liu Xiang. Liu Zhang was glad to meet Liu Ba. For every important discussion, Liu Zhang would consult Liu Ba.

However Pei Songzhi commented that when Emperor Ling of Han was emperor, Liu Yan already served as Minister of Ceremonies (太常) and by the time he was sent as Governor of Yi Province, Liu Xiang was just the Administrator of Jiangxia. Hence, he believes that Liu Xiang could not nominate Liu Yan as a xiaolian (civil service candidate)

When Liu Zhang sent Fa Zheng to welcome Liu Bei, Liu Ba reprimanded him as such: "Liu Bei is a great man. If you let him in Yi province, he will surely bring you misfortune. You have to stop him." Thereafter, when Liu Bei was in the province, Liu Ba once again reprimanded Liu Zhang: "If you send him against Zhang Lu, it would be like releasing a tiger in the mountains and forests." However Liu Zhang wouldn't listen so Liu Ba stopped leaving his house and claimed illness. When Liu Bei surrounded Chengdu, he ordered among his soldiers that anyone who would harm Liu Ba would suffer Nine familial exterminations. When Liu Bei finally met Liu Ba, he was deeply happy.

== Service under Liu Bei ==
When Yi Province was settled by Liu Bei. Liu Ba presented his excuses but Liu Bei did not hold him culpable. Moreover, Zhuge Liang repeatedly praised and recommended him for high position therefore Liu Bei appointed him as staff member to his office as Senior West Department Official (軍西曹掾).

=== Conflict with Zhang Fei ===
Zhang Fei once visited Liu Ba's home. However, Liu Ba refused to speak with him. Because of this, Zhang Fei was angered and furious. Therefore Zhuge Liang said to Liu Ba: "Although Zhang Fei is a martial person, he deeply admires and respects you. Right now, our lord needs to gather many civil and military officers to help him accomplish his great mission. Even if you are a man of high moral and bright talents, you should be less condescending of others." Liu Ba's reply to Zhuge Liang was "When a real man is born in this world, he must associate himself with the greatest heroes. How can I speak with a mere soldier?"

When he heard about this conversation, Liu Bei was furious. He said: "I wish to secure the empire however, Zichu (Liu Ba) wishes to throw it into disorder. His desire is to leave and return North; he is only borrowing this road. How could he help me settle my affairs?" Liu Bei also said "Zichu's ability and wisdom are far superior to any men. However even if I can employ him, I fear others wouldn't be able to." Zhuge Liang further said about Liu Ba "In logistics planning and strategies inside the tent curtains, I'm not the equal of Zichu. However if it's about beating the drums, gathering the army encampments and encouraging the common people to do their utmost, I can discuss this with others."

Zhang Zhao, advisor of the rival warlord Sun Quan, once criticized Liu Ba that he was condescending and should not have been so extreme in his refusal of Zhang Fei. Sun Quan's reply to Zhang Zhao was: "If Zichu had chosen to be insincere and follow the oscillation of the world, only acting to please Liu Bei rather than behaving as his own self then how could he be worthy to be praised as a lingshi (令士; a virtuous scholarly gentleman)?"

=== Managing Liu Bei's economy ===
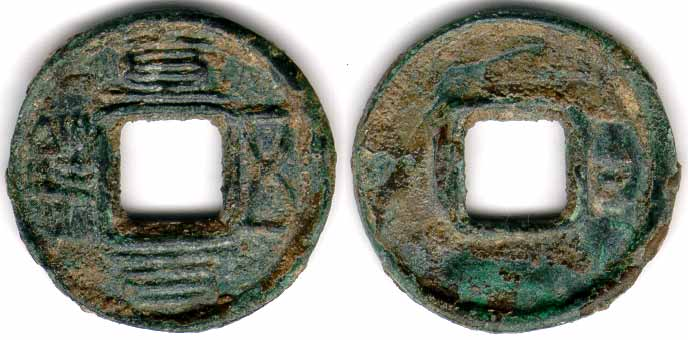
The zhi bai wu zhu coin issued from Liu Ba's suggestion

When Liu Bei started his campaign against Liu Zhang, he made an oath with his soldiers. That If their great enterprise is successful then the government treasury with all his goods shall be all theirs. And so when his army conquered Chengdu, all the soldiers threw away their shields and spears and compete with one another to the various stores to take valuable items. Soon the military supplies were falling and Liu Bei was deeply worried about this. Liu Ba told him: "It is simple! You simply have to issue coins worth a hundred coins (直百五銖; zhi bai wu zhu), have the price for them stable and order your officials to manage the government markets." Liu Bei followed his advice and within several months, all the government treasury was full again.

=== Liu Bei's imperial pretensions and death ===
In 219, Liu Bei declared himself King of Hanzhong and Liu Ba was promoted to be the Master of Writing (尚書) and soon took Fa Zheng's position as Prefect of the Masters of Writing (尚書令). Liu Ba himself conducted with purity and integrity. He would not engage in the management of property or production. Moreover, because he was not originally an officer of Liu Bei, he feared that he would face jealousy, doubt and suspicion. Therefore, Liu Ba was also respectful and always kept his composure. He was tranquil and did not engage in personal matters. He would speak of nothing but official business.

Around this time, Liu Bei was set to claim the imperial title for himself. Liu Ba did not think that Liu Bei should take the imperial throne yet and wanted him to change his mind. He joined with the registrar, Yong Mao (雍茂) to disagree with Liu Bei. Later, Liu Bei used another problem as an excuse to have Yong Mao killed. And so people from far away stopped joining him.

When Liu Bei took the title of Emperor, he had Liu Ba write all the documents, admonitions and decrees. He died in 222. After his death, when Chen Qun of the enemy state of Wei wrote to Zhuge Liang, when they would speak about Liu Ba, Chen Qun referred to him as "Lord Liu Zichu" (劉君子初) in his letter as a sign of his great respect for Liu Ba.

Of Liu Ba's objection to Liu Bei's imperial pretensions, Liu Qingzhi (劉清植) remarks that since Liu Ba was tasked to write all the documents, orders and decrees, he would not have been opposed to Liu Bei assuming the imperial throne. Liu Qingzhi also says that the Traditions of the Former Worthies would have used critical language when speaking of people of the enemy state and that it should not be trusted. (Note: Authorship has been attributed to Sima Biao, a member of the Jin royal family, however J. Mansvelt Beck has questioned the attribution. See Mansvelt Beck, The Treatises of the Later Han: Their Author, Sources, Content and Place in Chinese Historiography)

== Appraisal ==
Chen Shou, who wrote Liu Ba's biography in the Records of the Three Kingdoms (Sanguozhi), appraised Liu Ba as follows: "Liu Ba followed the integrity of the pure and exalted.... Along with Dong He, Ma Liang, Chen Zhen and Dong Yun, he was one of the best officials in Shu."

== See also ==
- Lists of people of the Three Kingdoms
