= Chen Zhen =

Chen Zhen may refer to:

- Chen Zhen (Three Kingdoms), Shu Han minister in the Three Kingdoms period
- Chen Zhen (character), fictional Chinese martial artist
- Chen Zhen (artist) (陈箴; 1955–2000), Chinese-French artist
- Chen Zhen (handballer) (born 1963), Chinese Olympic handball player
