= Dong He =

Chinese official and minister (died 221)

- 董和
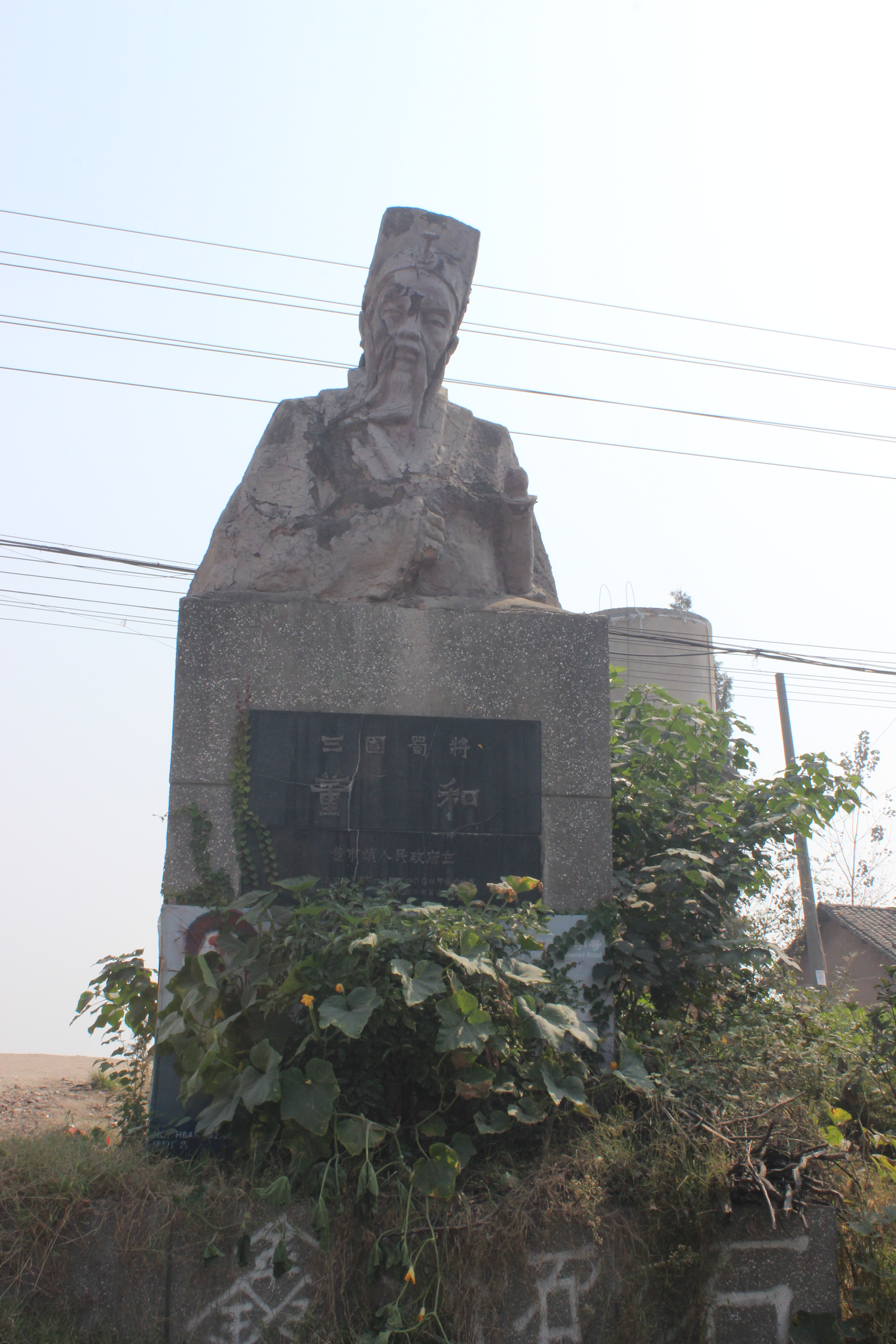
- A statue of Dong He in Zhijiang, Hubei

General of the Household and Manager of the Army (掌軍中郎將) (under Liu Bei)
- In office 214 – 221
- Monarch: Emperor Xian of Han / Liu Bei (from 219)

Administrator of Yizhou (益州太守) (under Liu Zhang)
- In office ? – 214
- Monarch: Emperor Xian of Han

Prefect of Chengdu (成都令) (under Liu Zhang)
- In office ?–?
- Monarch: Emperor Xian of Han

Personal details
- Born: Unknown Zhijiang, Hubei
- Died: early 221 (Note: Dong He's biography in volume 38 of Sanguozhi recorded that Zhuge Liang became Chancellor after his death (死之日家無儋石之財。亮後為丞相). The biography also recorded that he served seven years in office along with Zhuge Liang (又董幼宰參署七年). Therefore, Dong He must have died in early 221, before Liu Bei proclaimed himself Emperor and appointed Zhuge Liang as Chancellor in 15 May 221.)
- Children: Dong Yun
- Occupation: Official
- Courtesy name: Youzai (幼宰)

Dong He (died early 221), courtesy name Youzai, was an official in the state of Shu Han during the Three Kingdoms period of China. He originally served under the warlord Liu Zhang before becoming a subordinate of Liu Bei (the founding emperor of Shu) after Liu Zhang's surrender to Liu Bei in 214. He would serve in Liu Bei's office alongside Zhuge Liang until his death seven years later. He was known for his frugality and virtue, which earned him the admiration of the people of the land of Shu.

== Early life ==
Dong He was born in Zhijiang, Nan Commandery (南郡), which is present-day Zhijiang, Hubei. His ancestral home was in Jiangzhou, Ba Commandery. During the end of the Han dynasty, in 196, Dong He led his family back west in the Yi Province. (Note: Sun Jiaben believed that the text may have been erroneous. Moving eastward would have been necessary to go from Ba commandery to Nan commandery which was unusual at this time. In his opinion, the text must originally had Dong He's birthplace as Ba commandery with his ancestors moving there from Nan commandery. Lü Bi thinks the same. However, Chang Qu, another historian who wrote extensively about the history of the Sichuan region in the Chronicles of Huayang (Huayang Guo Zhi), also recorded Dong He as being born in Nan Commmandery (南郡董和).) Liu Zhang named him as Chief (長) of Niubi (牛鞞) and Jiangyuan (江原). Dong He was also appointed as Prefect of Chengdu (成都令).

== Service under Liu Zhang ==
During this time, the Yi province was rich and fruitful. Soon, the local customs became extravagant and wasteful. Those who managed properties dressed in the same clothes as marquises and ate with jade utensils. The marriage ceremonies and funeral processions were so extravagant that they could ruin an entire family. However, Dong He lived as an example for others. He wore simple clothing and was known to be a vegetarian. He guard himself against excess and would end the instituted regulations. Therefore, wherever he was, he improved the current customs. Awed by him, the magnates of the prefecture would not dare to break the laws.

This strict application of the laws didn't go well with the powerful and influential families of the region therefore they convinced Liu Zhang to have Dong He transferred far away as Commandant of the dependent state of Badong (巴東屬國都尉). Local officials and commoners learnt of this; several thousands begged to have Dong He stay, and among them were also the elderly and the frail.

Liu Zhang listened to them and allowed Dong He to stay for two years before he was appointed as the Administrator of Yizhou (益州太守), again a far away and still unruly land. Yet Dong He did not change his ways. His integrity and restraint remained the same. He resolved the common affairs with a sincere heart and would seek to work with the non-Han people. Hence the people from the southern region were fond of him and trusted him.

As a Commandery, Yizhou (益州) had many natural assets. Among them were parrots, peacocks, salt ponds, agricultural fields, fishing rivers, livestock along with gold and silver, making the region bountiful from common to rare resources. However, it was also difficult to maintain control over the territory because of the rebellious tribes. Dong He received praises from Chang Qu for being one of the few officials who could restrain the locals. Therefore, they could benefit from the abundant riches of the land.

== Service under Liu Bei ==
In 214, Liu Bei seized Yi province from Liu Zhang. At this time, Dong He was known for his righteousness and integrity in Sichuan. He was loved and trusted by the people of the whole province. Therefore, Liu Bei summoned him to serve as General of the Household and Manager of the Army (掌軍中郎將) alongside the Military Advisor General (軍師將軍) Zhuge Liang to manage his office affairs. They presented proposals that could be adopted while they turned back those that could not. In those positions, Zhuge Liang and Dong He were of the same mind. Since Dong He opened his office and started receiving a salary, he has been in charge of difficult regions, had to oversee important matters and managed high positions for more than twenty years. Yet the day he died, his family didn't have any personal wealth.

== Zhuge Liang's appreciation of Dong He and others ==
After Dong He's death, Zhuge Liang became Chancellor and told his various officers and subordinates: "Now advising and appointing in the office have the benefice of collecting everyone’s thoughts and gathering loyal benefit from other's ideas then extend loyalty. If far away there is even small resentment, that someone doesn't concur with today's agreement or disaccord isn't spoke plainly then there will be vast losses. However if opposition is reversed and unity secured then it is like relinquishing broken stilts and acquiring pearls and jade. Still, the concerns of a man’s heart can not be exhausted. Only Xu Shu (Yuanzhí) could deal quickly and without doubts with also Dong He (Youzai) who managed the office for seven years, if a matter was not completed then he would examine it as much as ten times then reach mutual understanding. If one person is able to emulate just one tenth of Yuanzhí or Youzai’s assiduous awareness and loyalty to the state then I can have fewer mistakes."

Zhuge Liang also said: "In the past, I first associated with Cuī Zhoupíng (崔州平). Then, I was often informed of my strengths and failings. Later, I would interact with Xu Yuanzhi and I was often met with his instruction. Earlier, I would consult important matters with Dong Youzai and with every speech he was conscientious and sincere. Afterward, I managed affairs with Hu Ji (Weidu) and frequently, I was met with his admonishments. Although my temperament and nature is rustic and ignorant hence I'm unable to always accept their comments completely, however with these four talented men I was friend from the start to the end and also aware enough to not have doubts of their loyal nature and upright words."

Zhuge Liang always spoke highly of Dong He and had fond memories of him after his death.

== Appraisal ==
Chen Shou, who wrote Dong He's biography in the Records of the Three Kingdoms (Sanguozhi), appraised Dong He as follows: "Dong He was a wise and honorable official. He pursued the purity of “The Sacrificial Lamb”... Along with Liu Ba, Ma Liang, Chen Zhen and Dong Yun, he was one of the best officials in Shu."

== See also ==
- Lists of people of the Three Kingdoms
