= Chen Zhen (Three Kingdoms) =

Chinese She Han state official (died 235)

- 陳震
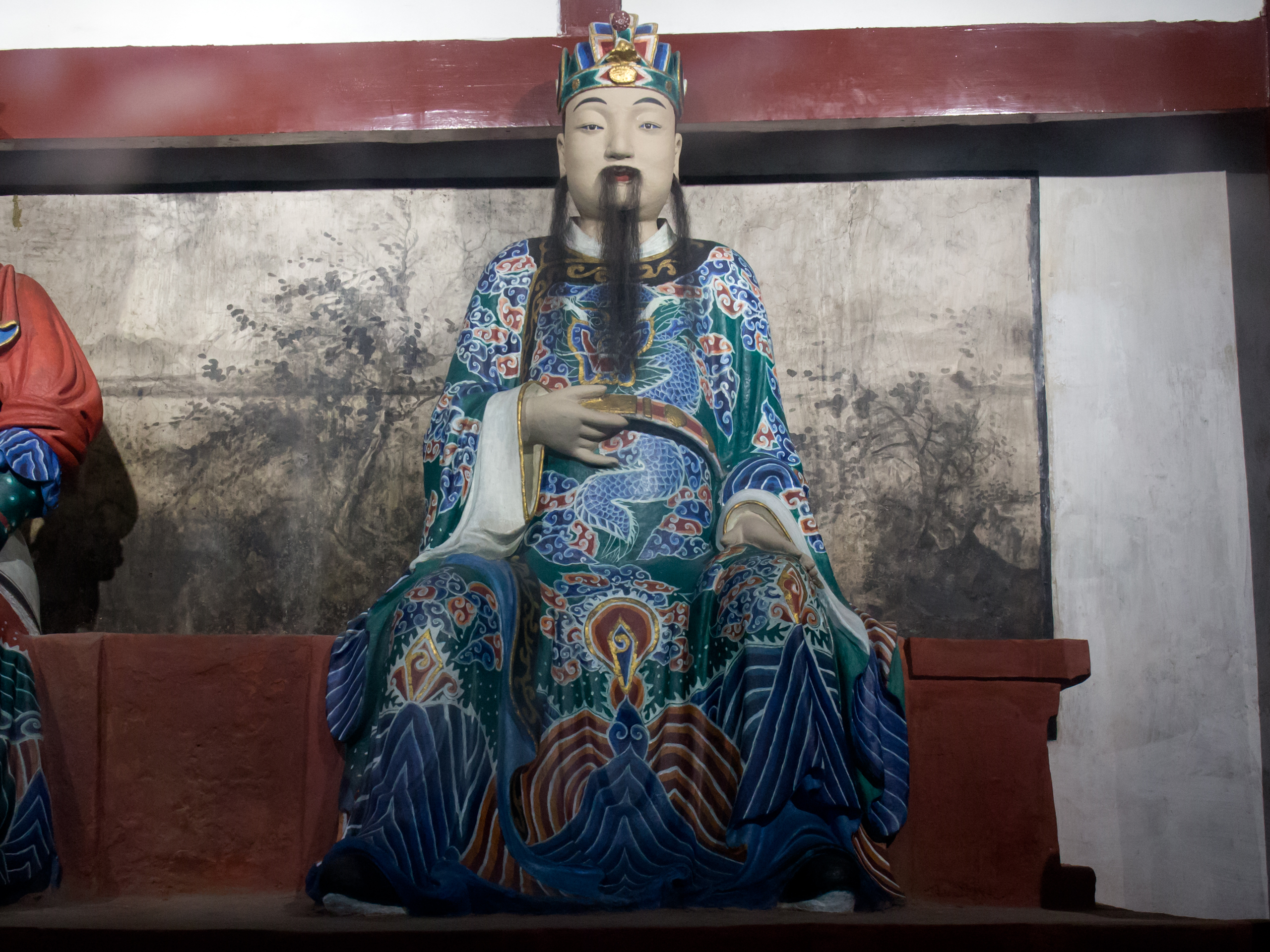
- Statue of Chen Zhen in the Zhuge Liang Memorial Temple in Chengdu, Sichuan

Minister of the Guards (衛尉)
- In office 229 – 235
- Monarch: Liu Shan
- Chancellor: Zhuge Liang

Prefect of the Masters of Writing (尚書令)
- In office 225 – 229
- Monarch: Liu Shan
- Chancellor: Zhuge Liang

Master of Writing (尚書)
- In office 225 – 225
- Monarch: Liu Shan
- Chancellor: Zhuge Liang

Administrator of Jianwei (犍為太守)
- In office ?–?

Administrator of Wenshan (汶山太守)
- In office ?–?

Commandant of the North District of Shu Commandery (蜀郡北部都尉)
- In office 214 – ?

Personal details
- Born: Unknown Nanyang, Henan
- Died: 235
- Children: Chen Ji
- Occupation: Official
- Courtesy name: Xiaoqi (孝起)
- Peerage: Marquis of Chengyang Village (城陽亭侯)

Chen Zhen (died 235), courtesy name Xiaoqi, was an official of the state of Shu Han in the Three Kingdoms period of China. When Liu Bei became Governor of Jing Province, Chen Zhen was hired to serve as a local officer and was stationed in various commanderies. When Liu Bei entered Yi Province (covering present-day Sichuan and Chongqing), Chen Zhen remained in his service, where he progressed in rank and soon became Prefect of the Masters of Writing at the capital. When Sun Quan declared himself emperor and established the state of Eastern Wu in 229, Liu Shan sent Chen Zhen to offer his congratulations and to form an alliance, which he did, and they also drew out their respective states' boundaries.

== Life ==
Chen Zhen was born in Nanyang Commandery, which is around present-day Nanyang, Henan. When Liu Bei was Governor of the Jing Province in 209, Chen Zhen was recruited among Liu Bei's staff an attendant clerk with authority over the various commanderies. (Note: According to Fang Beichen, Chen Zhen's mission was to assure the timely submission of documents from the commanderies and counties, as well to report any illegal activities committed by commandery officials) Chen Zhen followed Liu Bei into Yi Province. When the conflict was settled in 214, Liu Bei further employed him as Commandant of the North District of Shu Commandery (蜀郡北部都尉). Later because the commandery name was changed, he became Administrator of Wenshan (汶山太守). Then, he was transferred to be Administrator of Jianwei (犍為太守).

In 225, Chen Zhen joined the court at the capital Chengdu and was appointed as Master of Writing (尚書). Chen Zhen was further promoted to Prefect of the Masters of Writing (尚書令). Moreover, he was sent as an envoy to Eastern Wu.

In 229, Sun Quan declared himself emperor. At the same time, Chen Zhen was appointed as Minister of the Guards (衛尉) and was sent with the perilous task to congratulate Sun Quan's ascension. Zhuge Liang thought highly of him and praised him in a letter wrote to his elder brother Zhuge Jin in Wu: “Xiaoqi is of honest and loyal nature even so he becomes even wiser as he grows older. He speaks praise of all things, is joyful and peaceful and want to bring the best to the East and the West. His conduct is praiseworthy.”

When Chen Zhen entered Wu's borders, he sent a message to the captain of the pass. He said:

“The East joined with the West is such that the messenger comes and goes. Their caps and canopies in plain sight, They extend the pledge to reaffirm the friendship of before. Each days producing new model of it. And so the respected ruler of the East accepts the sacred blessing to rule. He proclaimed his acceptance of the seals, judges the land and space and receive Heaven's signs. The realm responds in answer, and each and every pays respect. Now that it has come to this, Both of our state may join our hearts and be of one mind to defeat the bandit rebels and when we attack how can we fail to crush them! The western court’s lord and ministers all eagerly await this happy alliance. I, Zhen, though I am an untalented man, was chosen to accomplish my mission as an envoy. And to respectfully arrange union, respect and friendship between us. I step over our border and leap with joy entering as Wu as if I'm returning home. When Xianzi (獻子) went to Lu, he violated their taboo concerning their hills, and the Spring and Autumn Annals ridiculed him. I expect that you will inform me to certainly serve as messenger to establish friendship. In the next few days I will address the crowds, and each side will pledge alliance. I must follow the current, floating swiftly. The state laws here are different, and I fear I may commit some violation. Hopefully I will certainly be instructed and shown what should be done.”

Chen Zhen was treated with respect by Sun Quan. And when he arrived at Wuchang. Both, Sun Quan and him ascended the Altar and together smeared their mouths with blood to pledge to the formed alliance between Wu and Shu. Then, they divided the realm Under Heaven; and so Xu, Yu, You and Qīng belong to Wu; While Bing, Liang, Ji and Yan belong to Shu Han. The lands of Si province would be divided with Hang Valley Aass (函谷關) as the border. (Note: Three Kingdoms#/media/File:Han provinces.jpg) After his mission was accomplished, Chen Zhen returned to Shu and was given a fief as Marquis of Chengyang Village (城陽亭侯).

In 231, during Zhuge Liang's fourth expedition Li Ping failed to provide supplies to Zhuge Liang's camp and falsely called off the campaign to hide it. After further investigations, he was found guilty and dismissed from office. Zhuge Liang with his Chief Clerk Jiang Wan and the Palace Attendant Dong Yun about this matter wrote to the court: "When Xiaoqi was previously sent in mission to Wu, he told us that "Zhengfang has scales and shells in his stomach" (Note: This expression is used to define someone behaving with arrogant and prickly attitude. The reference is to fish scales and turtle shells.) Moreover, that the locals thought of him as someone unapproachable. I just assumed that when dealing with someone who "has scales and shells in his stomach", It would be a matter of not provoking them and so I could not imagine that there would be another incident like with Su Qin (蘇秦) and Zhang Yi (張儀), (Note: Su Qin and Zhang Yi were diplomats famous for their duplicity during the Warring States period of Chinese history.) hence we were all surprised at this turn of event. Only Xiaoqi saw through this.”

Chen Zhen died in 235. His son Chen Ji (陳濟) inherited his father's title and became the next Marquis of Chengyang Village (城陽亭侯).

== Appraisal ==
Chen Shou, who wrote Chen Zhen's biography in the Records of the Three Kingdoms (Sanguozhi), appraised Chen Zhen as follows: "Chen Zhen was faithful and respectful and as he grew older he was increasingly sincere.... Along with Dong He, Liu Ba, Ma Liang and Dong Yun, he was one of the best officials in Shu."

== In Romance of the Three Kingdoms ==
Chen Zhen first appears in the 14th-century historical novel Romance of the Three Kingdoms as a subordinate of the warlord Yuan Shao. His actions under Yuan Shao are not unlike his duties with Liu Bei, where he performs diplomatic tasks such as delivering Liu Bei's letter to Guan Yu in Luoyang, and meeting with Sun Ce to request aid against Cao Cao. Also in the novel, it was he who suggested to Liu Bei that he meet the seer Li Yi (李意) while mourning the deaths of his brothers.

== See also ==
- Lists of people of the Three Kingdoms
