= Ma Liang (Three Kingdoms) =

Chinese official (187–222)

- 馬良
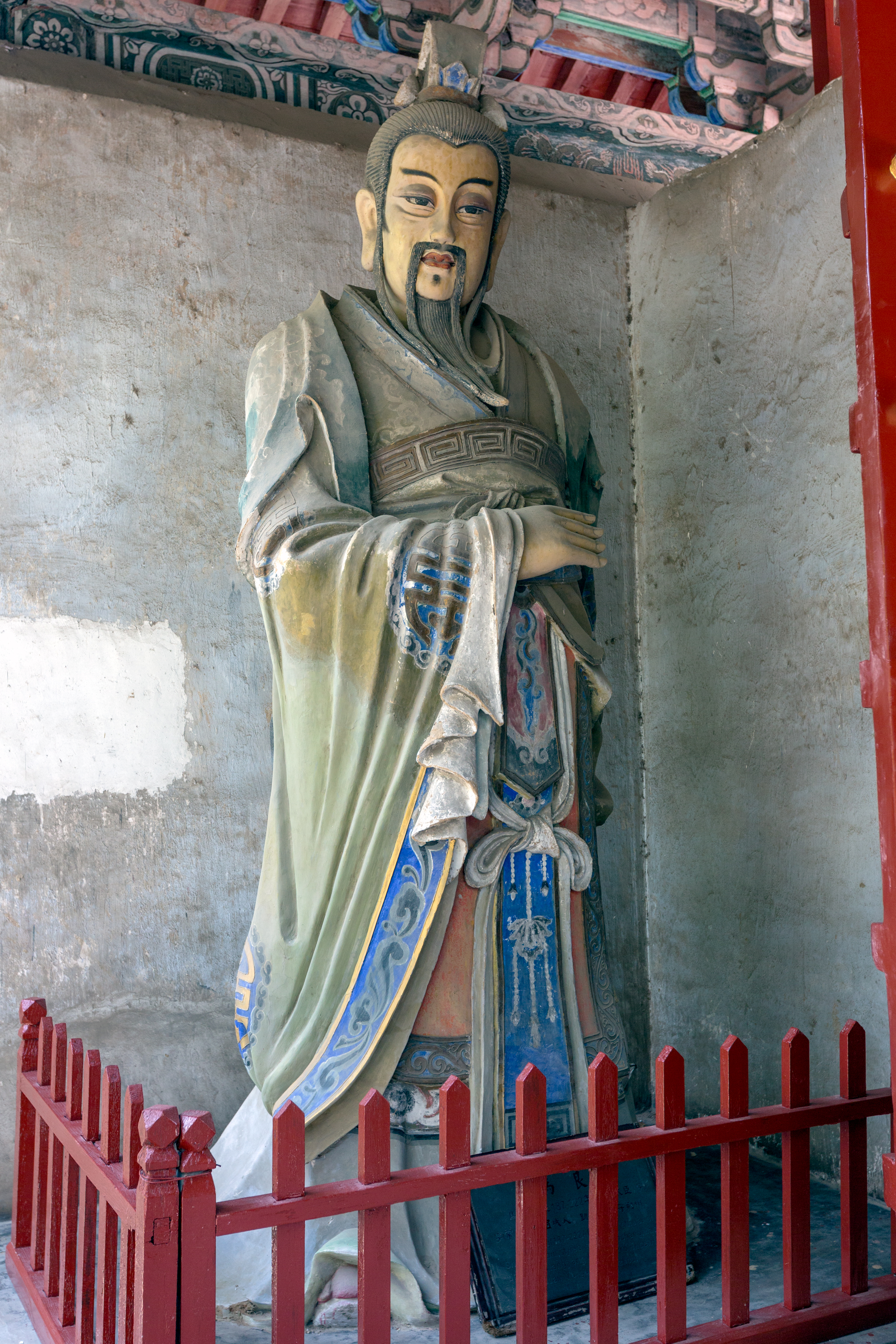
- Statue of Ma Liang in the Emperor Guan Temple in Xuchang, Henan

Palace Attendant
- In office 221 – 222
- Monarch: Liu Bei

Senior Clerk (掾) (under Liu Bei)
- In office 214 – 221
- Monarchs: Emperor Xian of Han/ Liu Bei (from 219)

Assistant Officer (從事) (under Liu Bei)
- In office 209 – 214
- Monarch: Emperor Xian of Han

Personal details
- Born: 187 (Note: The Sanguozhi recorded that Ma Liang died at the age of 36 (by East Asian age reckoning) at the Battle of Xiaoting in 222. By calculation, Ma Liang's birth year should be around 187.) Yicheng, Hubei
- Died: 222 (aged 35) Yidu County or Changyang County, Hubei
- Relations: Ma Su (brother); three other brothers
- Children: Ma Bing
- Occupation: Official
- Courtesy name: Jichang (季常)
- Nickname: "White Eyebrows" (白眉)

Ma Liang (187–222), courtesy name Jichang, was a Chinese politician who serving under the warlord Liu Bei during the late Eastern Han dynasty of China. Since he was young, Ma Liang was famous for his exceptional talent, with Chen Shou describing him as one of Shu's best officials. However, he was killed in battle at the age of 35 years during the Battle of Xiaoting. He served in the state of Shu Han as one of the founding emperor Liu Bei's Palace Attendants during the early Three Kingdoms period and was the elder brother of Ma Su.

== Life ==
Ma Liang was born in Yicheng County (宜城縣), Xiangyang, which is present-day Yicheng, Hubei. He had four brothers, all of them well known as gifted individual. Ma Su was one of them. However, Ma Liang was esteemed as the most talented. He had white strands of hair in his eyebrows. There was a saying in Ma Liang's hometown to describe him and his brothers: "Of the Five Changs (五常) in the Ma family, White Eyebrows (白眉) is the most liang." (Note: Ma Liang and his four brothers all had the Chinese character chang (常) in their courtesy names. Ma Liang's given name, liang (良), literally means "good". Therefore, the saying can be interpreted as "White Eyebrows" is the best among the five Ma brothers.")

Around 209, when the warlord Liu Bei took charge of Jing Province (covering present-day Hubei and Hunan) after the death of its Inspector (刺史), Liu Qi, he recruited Ma Liang to serve as an Assistant Officer (從事) under him. Later in 211, when Liu Bei left Jing Province for an expedition in Yi Province (covering present-day Sichuan and Chongqing), Ma Liang remained behind in Jing Province. Ma Liang was a close friend of Liu Bei's strategist Zhuge Liang and they were sworn brothers.

He once wrote a letter to Zhuge Liang, who was in Yi Province at the time, to praise and encourage him. The letter was written as such:

"I have heard that Luo Castle (雒城) has fallen and this is Heaven's blessing. Honored elder brother, you are responding to the time by helping the wise and joining him in his great enterprise. And now bringing glory to the state. Favorable omens are appearing. Today, those matters will require your careful examination and your wise deliberation so you can bring them to clarity. You should sought the help of men of talent while helping those below. When it comes to "softening the glare", and bringing comfort to those afar, sacrificing oneself so he can lead virtue through the great realm, allowing for those of our age to be free of worries, respectful of others and behaving in the rightful way, arranging beautiful tunes and rectifying the airs of Zheng (鄭) and Wei (衛), so they became instruments to the affairs of the state, without sowing disharmony among the people. These are the epitome of orchestration, the harmonies of Bo Ya (伯牙) and Shi Kuang (師矌). Though I may not be Zhong Qi (鍾期), dare I not strike the staves!" (Note: Bo Ya, Shi Kuang and Zhong Qi were famous musicians during the Spring and Autumn period, famed for being able to discern the mood and thoughts of a person from their music.)

Zhuge Liang was happy to receive those words from Ma Liang and cherished them as they shared a close bond.

Following Liu Bei's takeover of Yi Province, Ma Liang was promoted to the position of a Senior Clerk (掾) in the office of the General of the Left (左將軍). (Note: Liu Bei nominally held the appointment of General of the Left (左將軍) under the Han central government.)

Ma Liang was later appointed as an emissary to meet the warlord Sun Quan, Liu Bei's ally. Before his mission to Wu, Ma Liang spoke to Zhuge Liang: "Now that I'm sent by the state with the mission to bring harmony and friendship between our two nations. May I have the chance to be introduced by you to General Sun Quan?" Zhuge Liang answered: "You ought to try writing something yourself." And so Ma Liang wrote a draft that said: "Our wise lord send his advisor Ma Liang to convey respects, bring gifts and extend prosperity to our friendship thereby continue on the praiseworthy legacy of Kunwu (昆吾) and Shiwei (豕韋). I'm a fortunate man of some talent from Jing and Chu region. Rarely, I'm rash in action and yet I have the virtue of seeing matters through to the end. With a calm heart, I turn my head toward you hoping you deign to accept me and give me assistance so I can accomplish my mission." Sun Quan received and treated Ma Liang very respectfully.

In 221, after the collapse of the Eastern Han dynasty, Liu Bei declared himself emperor and established the state of Shu Han. Ma Liang was appointed as Palace Attendant in Shu. Later that year, Liu Bei launched a campaign against Sun Quan, (Note: The alliance between Liu Bei and Sun Quan was broken in late 219 when Sun launched a stealth invasion on Liu's territories in Jing Province, seizing all the lands and executing Guan Yu.) leading to the Battle of Xiaoting. Ma Liang was tasked with persuading the tribal peoples in Wuling (武陵; around present-day Wuling District, Changde, Hunan) to join Liu Bei and he succeeded in his mission. The army's advance until they arrived at Xiaoting in Yidao, from there Liu Bei extended his camps closely linked to each other. While Ma Liang following the road to Wuling was further sent to oversee and manage the affairs of the Yi and Man tribes that previously joined Liu Bei. Liu Bei was eventually defeated by Sun Quan's general Lu Xun at the Battle of Xiaoting in 222 and Ma Liang was killed in action. Later, after he managed to retreat to Baidicheng (in present-day Fengjie County, Chongqing) safely, Liu Bei appointed Ma Liang's son, Ma Bing (馬秉), as a Cavalry Commandant (騎都尉).

== Appraisal ==
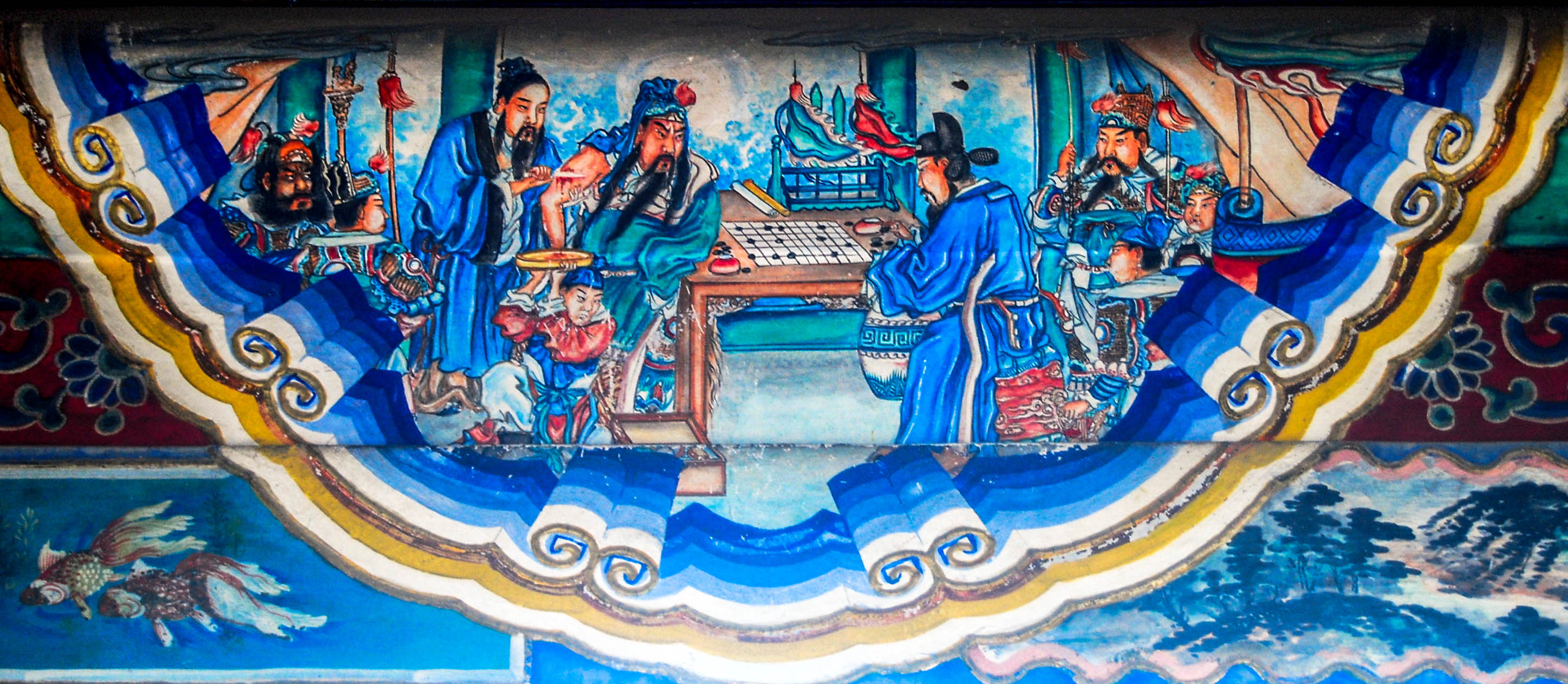
Ma Liang playing Go against Guan Yu while Hua Tuo treats his poisoned arm by scraping the bone (刮骨療毒), portrait at the Long Corridor of the Summer Palace, Beijing

Chen Shou, who wrote Ma Liang's biography in the Records of the Three Kingdoms (Sanguozhi), appraised Ma Liang as follows: "Ma Liang was incorruptible, honest and was praised as an outstanding elite. He was worthy to be called a lingshi (令士; a virtuous scholarly gentleman)... Along with Dong He, Liu Ba, Chen Zhen and Dong Yun, he was one of the best officials in Shu."

== In Romance of the Three Kingdoms ==
Ma Liang is a minor character in the 14th-century historical novel Romance of the Three Kingdoms, He joined Liu Bei under Yi Ji's recommendation along with his younger brother Ma Su. Then, he advised Liu Bei to have Liu Qi appointed as Governor of Jing Province to satisfy the people while he would conquer the southern Commanderies. During the conquest of Yi, he stayed behind and acted as Guan Yu's main civil advisor mostly as a voice of reason during the negotiation with Wu and playing weiqi against Guan Yu during Hua Tuo's famous operation.

== See also ==
- Lists of people of the Three Kingdoms
