= Zhu Jianping =

2nd-century Chinese physiognomy expert

- 朱建平

Personal details
- Born: Unknown Pei Commandery
- Died: 220–226

Zhu Jianping (fl. 213 – c. 220) was an expert in physiognomy and horses whose reputation saw him gain position at Eastern Han dynasty warlord Cao Cao's court and at a gathering for the future Cao Wei Emperor Cao Pi predicted the fates of prominent figures there, said to be rarely wrong.

== Life ==
Zhu Jianping was from Pei Commandery. He gained a reputation for his skill in physiognomy, said to be without a single error at that time, among the people and in 213 the Duke of Wei Cao Cao appointed Zhu Jianping to court. He became friends with Xun You and Zhong Yao who asked Zhu Jianping for a reading together; the prediction warned that though Xun You was younger (Note: Zhong Yao was born in 151, while Xun You was born in 157.), Zhong Yao would be the one left caring for Xun You's household. Zhong Yao joked all he would do was arrange a marriage for Xun You's concubine but after Xun You died in 214, Zhong Yao was left reflecting on the joke as he indeed looked for a marriage for the concubine. Zhong Yao wrote that Zhu Jianping's skill was greater than figures of the past like the Warring States physiognomist Tang Ju and former Han diviner Xu Fu.

Zhu Jianping was also skilled with horses and one day, upon seeing a horse prepared in the courtyard for Cao Pi, Zhu Jianping warned the horse would not survive the day. When Cao Pi tried to ride the horse, it became unsettled by Cao Pi's fragrant clothing and bit Cao Pi on the knee. Cao Pi was furious and had the horse killed.

Zhu Jianping died in the Huangchu period during Cao Pi's reign, which means he died sometime between 220–226.

== Predictions at Cao Pi's gathering ==
Cao Pi, as Five Offices Cadet-General (五官將), (Note: thus dating the event to between spring of 211 till late 217, when Cao Pi was made heir, with Lu Kanru dating it to 214.) held a gathering of over thirty people and invited Zhu Jianping to use his skills to assess the lifespans of Cao Pi and his guests. Chen Shou only gave a few examples as not all could go into detail but noted that Zhu largely made accurate predictions; only the future Excellency Wang Chang, the General Cheng Xi and future Minister Wang Su got incorrect predictions. Rafe de Crespigny notes a pattern in the recorded predictions of a crisis at midlife that, if overcame, would give them further lease of life.

Zhu Jianping told Cao Pi his lifespan was eighty years but would suffer a small hardship when he was forty and would need to take care. In 226, when Cao Pi was forty, (Note: While age at death is 38–39 by western count, in Chinese reckoning of the age it is 40 sui as people were considered to be aged one at birth. See East Asian age reckoning.) he became mortally ill with Cao Pi remarking to his attendants that Zhu Jianping had counted both day and night for the forty years; it was now the time for his death.

Cao Pi's younger half-brother Cao Biao was advised by Zhu Jianping that he would be in charge of a state but at the age of 57, would suffer a disaster with warfare so Cao should avoid it. In 222, the new Emperor Cao Pi made Cao Biao a Prince from possibly 248 and certainly from 249, Cao Biao plotted with Wang Ling to end Sima Yi's control at court and replace the Emperor Cao Fang. On 7 June 251 the plot was revealed by Huang Hua, the Inspector of Yan Province. Cao Biao was allowed to take his own life with his state abolished.

Xiahou Wei was told he would be in charge of a province at the age of forty-nine, if he could survive the hardship at that time then he would live to seventy and become an Excellency. When forty-nine years old, Xiahou Wei was Inspector of Yan Province and fell ill. Remembering the prophecy, Xiahou Wei made his preparations for death including organizing his funeral and making a final will but by the end of the month, his health recovered. The evening before his birthday, he invited guests for a drinking party, talking of how when the rooster crowed he would have made it through the hardship Zhu Jianping had warned of. However, after seeing his guests out, Xiahou Wei became ill again and he died that night.

The poet Ying Qu (應璩), who had close ties to the Cao family, was told by Zhu Jianping that at the age of sixty-two he would be a trusted official, but a year before his death, he would see a white dog that nobody else would see. When Ying Qu was sixty-one and a Palace Attendant, he saw a white dog in the government offices but, despite asking around, he found no one else had seen the dog. Remembering Zhu Jianping's warning, Ying Qu spent his last year traveling around, having celebrations and throwing feats for his friends, enjoying his last year. He duly died in 252.

Wang Su, according to his own account, was told he would reach seventy and become an Excellency. When he fell ill in 256 at the age of sixty-two the doctors gave up hope, but Wang Su told his wife he would be fine as Zhu Jianping's predictions for both age and rank had yet to pass so why should he fear? He died.

== Appraisal ==
Chen Shou lists Zhu Jianping among Hua Tuo, Du Kui, Guan Lu and Zhou Xuan as expert technicians, with skills of their chosen art that were out of the ordinary with a specialty in the mysterious and profound. Zhou Xuan's dream interpretations in their accuracy were compared to Jianping's skill with physiognomy.
