= Xi Zuochi =

4th-century Jin dynasty historian (習鑿齒)

- Traditional Chinese: 習鑿齒
- Simplified Chinese: 习凿齿
Transcriptions
Standard Mandarin
- Hanyu Pinyin: Xí Zuòchǐ
- Wade–Giles: Hsi Tso-ch'ih

Yanwei (courtesy name)
- Traditional Chinese: 彥威
- Simplified Chinese: 彦威
Transcriptions
Standard Mandarin
- Hanyu Pinyin: Yànwēi

Xi Zuochi (after 316 – 384), courtesy name Yanwei, was a Jin dynasty historian native to Xiangyang, Hubei. He is principally remembered for being the first historian to regard the Wei dynasty as an illegitimate successor to the Han dynasty.

== Life ==
Born into a powerful family of local magnates, Xi Zuochi was ambitious and studious from a young age. Beginning his career as a clerk, Xi Zuochi came to the attention of Inspector of Jing Province Huan Wen through the repeated recommendations of Yuan Qiao (袁喬), magistrate of Jiangxia Commandery. Huan Wen greatly esteemed Xi Zuochi, promoting him three times during the course of a single year, such that Xi Zuochi held the position of Superintendent of Records in the central administration of Jing Province while he was still a young man, possibly not yet thirty years old. Huan Wen would occasionally employ Xi Zuochi as an administrative aide whilst on campaign, and he excelled in all his duties whether in camp or in the office.

Xi Zuochi's relationship with his employer became strained after a visit to the capital city, where he met Sima Yu, future Emperor Jianwen of Jin and political rival of Huan Wen. Xi Zuochi was apparently so taken with Sima Yu that Huan Wen felt it best to distance himself from Xi Zuochi, and demoted him to Grand Administrator of Hengyang, in the Xiang river basin far to the south, in present-day Hunan. Xi Zuochi may have suffered a stroke at this time, contributing to his difficulty walking later in life.

While in quasi-banishment in the deep south, Xi Zuochi composed his greatest work, The Annals of Han and Jin (漢晉春秋), in 54 fascicles. Intended as a corrective against Huan Wen's increasingly undeserved imperial ambitions, Xi Zuochi took the inventive and iconoclastic step of delegitimating the Wei dynasty, theorising that ritual abdication alone was not enough to establish a legitimate dynasty with a true mandate. He developed a disease of the feet which caused him to limp, quit his post, and went home to Xiangyang, collecting a local history gazette titled Records of the Elders of Xiangyang (襄陽耆舊記).

Xiangyang at this time was a flourishing centre of Buddhism, due in no small part to the activity of Shi Dao'an, whom Xi Zuochi greatly admired, advocated, and was friendly with. He introduced himself to Shi Dao'an via letter in 365, and the two met shortly thereafter. In a separate letter to Xie An, one of the most powerful figures in the Jin court, Xi Zuochi effuses solemnly about Shi Dao'an's monastic mastery, and advocates that the two ought meet. In 378, northern armies under Fu Jian besieged Xiangyang, and in 379 the city fell. Xi Zuochi and Shi Dao'an were taken to Fu Jian's capital at Chang'an. Fu Jian was extremely pleased with his acquisition of two such eminent intellectuals, and rewarded them richly. However Xi Zuochi, citing illness, refused entry into Fu Jian's service and returned to Xiangyang.

Jin forces recaptured Xiangyang in 383, and the court offered Xi Zuochi the job of compiling an official national history, but his death interrupted any progress he may have made on the project.

== The Annals of Han and Jin ==
In 220, Emperor Xian of Han formally abdicated the imperial throne to Cao Pi, who then became the founding emperor of the Wei dynasty. This succession reflected the political reality of Cao Wei control over the imperial court as well as the majority of economic and demographic resources in China, and satisfied propriety through the ritual abdication ceremony. Since the time of Chen Shou, who compiled his massive Records of the Three Kingdoms sometime in the 280s or 290s, historians had treated the Wei dynasty as the legitimate as well as de facto successors to the Han, in part because the ruling Jin dynasty partially derived its legitimacy through a smooth transfer of the mandate through Wei. Xi Zuochi put forth an alternative judgment, stating that as Wei neither controlled the whole of China nor had imperial blood in its ruling house, it should be considered an illegitimate dynasty, no better than the Xin dynasty of Wang Mang. According to Xi Zuochi's biography in the Book of Jin, he formulated his theory of dynastic legitimation in the Annals of Han and Jin (漢晉春秋 Han Jin Chunqiu) in order to curb and correct his overambitious patron, Huan Wen. (Note: The Xu Jin Yang Qiu also recorded a similar observation.)

Even the work's title, naming the Han and Jin dynasties without mention of the intervening Wei, is indicative of its primary thrust. The annals began with Emperor Guangwu of Han, restorer of the dynasty and founding emperor of the Eastern (or Later) Han, and continued through to the time of Emperor Min of Jin, final emperor of the Western Jin (i.e. years CE 25–317). Although his primary goal was to argue that ritual abdication was insufficient to achieve a legitimate mandate, Xi Zuochi's aims had the secondary effect of legitimating Liu Bei's Shu Han as the legitimate successor to the Han dynasty, which he displayed by employing the Shu Han calendar, going so far as to use dynastic founder Emperor Wu of Jin's taboo personal name in recording the events of Liu Shan's final regnal year. Late in life, in his final memorial to the throne, Xi Zuochi laid bare his rationale and method behind delegitimating Wei while conducting the balancing act of considering the Jin dynasty still legitimate.

Xi Zuochi's heterodox theory met with little acceptance during his lifetime or in the centuries immediately following his death. It was not until the Song dynasty when Ouyang Xiu and Sima Guang echoed his criteria for dynastic legitimacy that mainstream historiography embraced Xi Zuochi's thought. Zhu Xi was extremely politically concerned with legitimating Shu Han, and arrived at the same conclusions as Xi Zuochi from a different basis and direction. From that point on, according to the compilers of the Siku Quanshu, "there were none who did not reject Chen Shou [i.e. a legitimate Wei dynasty], accepting instead Xi Zuochi", although they emphasised that both men were products of their environments.

== Criticism ==
Pei Songzhi cites Xi Zuochi repeatedly in his Annotated Records of the Three Kingdoms, even preferring his account of certain events over historically closer records. (Note: However, Pei also criticized Xi for deliberately downplaying the scale of Cao Mao's funeral due to his bias.) However, he also accuses Xi Zuochi of forging a letter from Wang Ling to his nephew Linghu Yu (令狐愚), basing his suspicions on the letter's style and language, as well as the fact that Xi Zuochi's work alone out of all his sources carried the text. In a separate account, Pei Songzhi cites an episode from Xi Zuochi's Records of the Elders of Xiangyang, about Xiangyang native Dong Hui assisting Fei Yi in a difficult diplomatic encounter with Sun Quan, and subsequently being appointed to the chancellery staff of Zhuge Liang and made grand administrator of Ba commandery. Pei Songzhi goes on to note that Xi Zuochi's own Annals of Han and Jin disagrees with this episode, and that Dong Hui's rapid promotion is incompatible with Chen Shou's base text remarking that Dong Hui held only a minor appointment. Pei Songzhi chides Xi Zuochi as something of an incautious scholar because of these discrepancies.

== Family ==
- Uncles: Luo Chong (羅崇) and Luo You (羅友)
- Son: Xi Piqiang (習辟彊 or 辟強), Palace Retainer for the General of Cavalry
