= Hu Ji =

3rd century Shu Han state general

- 胡濟

Right General of Agile Cavalry (右驃騎將軍)
- In office 256 – ?
- Monarch: Liu Shan

Senior General Who Guards the West (鎮西大將軍)
- In office ? – 256
- Monarch: Liu Shan

Area Commander of Hanzhong (漢中都督)
- In office 248 – ?
- Monarch: Liu Shan
- Preceded by: Wang Ping

Central Manager of the Army (中典軍)
- In office 234 – 248
- Monarch: Liu Shan

General of the Household of Illustrious Martial Might (昭武中郎將)
- In office ? – 234
- Monarch: Liu Shan
- Chancellor: Zhuge Liang

Personal details
- Born: Unknown; Tongbai County, Henan
- Died: Unknown
- Relations: Hu Bo (brother)
- Occupation: General
- Courtesy name: Weidu (偉度)
- Peerage: Marquis of Chengyang Village (成陽亭侯)

Hu Ji (fl. 220s–258), courtesy name Weidu, was a military general of the state of Shu Han in the Three Kingdoms period of China.

== Life ==
Hu Ji was from Yiyang County (義陽縣), Yiyang Commandery (義陽郡), which is located east of present-day Tongbai County, Henan. Little is known about his early life; the first mention of him in historical records was when he was already serving in the Shu Han state during the Three Kingdoms period as a Registrar (主簿) under Zhuge Liang, the Imperial Chancellor and regent of Shu.

In 231, the Shu general Li Yan, who was in charge of logistics during the military campaigns against Shu's rival state Cao Wei, failed to ensure that supplies were transported to the frontline in time. He then attempted to fraudulently cover up his failure, but Zhuge Liang discovered the truth. Hu Ji, then holding the position of acting Army Adviser (參軍) and General of the Household of Illustrious Martial Might (昭武中郎將), joined Zhuge Liang in petitioning the Shu emperor Liu Shan to strip Li Yan of his appointments and titles.

Following Zhuge Liang's death in 234, Liu Shan appointed Hu Ji as zhongdianjun (中典軍) and enfeoffed him as the Marquis of Chengyang Village (成陽亭侯). When the Shu general Wang Ping died in 248, the Shu imperial court appointed Hu Ji as the Area Commander of Hanzhong to replace Wang Ping, in addition to granting him imperial authority and appointing him as the nominal Inspector (刺史) of Yan Province. (Note: Yan Province was under the control of Shu's rival state, Wei, at the time, so Hu Ji could only be the provincial Inspector in name.) Some years later, he was promoted to Senior General Who Guards the West (鎮西大將軍).

In 256, when the Shu general Jiang Wei led Shu forces on a military campaign against Wei, he made arrangements with Hu Ji, who was leading another detachment, to rendezvous with him in Shanggui County (上邽縣; in present-day Tianshui, Gansu). However, Hu Ji did not show up, and Jiang Wei ended up being defeated by Wei forces under Deng Ai's command. Hu Ji was later promoted to Right General of Agile Cavalry (右驃騎將軍). In 258, Jiang Wei deployed Hu Ji, Wang Han (王含) and Jiang Bin (蔣斌) in Hanshou County (漢壽縣; northeast of present-day Jiange County, Sichuan), Yuecheng County (樂城縣; present-day Chenggu County, Shaanxi) and Hancheng County (漢城縣; present-day Mian County, Shaanxi) to guard against invasions from Wei.

Hu Ji died in an unknown year. He was known for being loyal, upright and honest. Zhuge Liang once mentioned that Hu Ji, Cui Zhouping (崔州平), Xu Shu and Dong He (董和) were the only ones among his friends who could criticise him and point out his shortcomings and failures.

== See also ==
- Lists of people of the Three Kingdoms
