= Du Kui =

Chinese musician and official to warlord Liu Biao

- Traditional Chinese: 杜夔
- Simplified Chinese: 杜夔
Transcriptions
Standard Mandarin
- Hanyu Pinyin: Dù Kuí
- Wade–Giles: Tu K'uei

Gongliang (courtesy name)
- Chinese: 公良
Transcriptions
Standard Mandarin
- Hanyu Pinyin: Gōngliáng
- Wade–Giles: Kung-liang

Du Kui (fl. 180–225), courtesy name Gongliang, was a musician and official who served under the warlord Liu Biao in the late Eastern Han dynasty of China. He served in the state of Cao Wei during the Three Kingdoms period.

== Life ==
Du Kui attempted to stop Liu Biao from performing imperial music in his own court. He was proficient in tuning the bells and other musical instruments expertise, but not in arrangement of dances and singing. With help from other court specialists, he researched old musical practices and texts and gained credit for "starting restoration of the ancient music" (yayue).

While in the service of the warlord Cao Cao, Du Kui got into an argument with Chai Yu (柴玉), a bell-caster. He had forced Chai Yu to recast the bell set several times for the lack of regular pitch.

Cao Cao's successor, Cao Pi, favoured Chai Yu. Under the pretext of Du Kui's discomfort with court music for entertainment (mouth organ and zithers), Cao Pi had him dismissed. Du Kui died soon afterwards.

== Legacy ==
Liu Xie (465–522) praised Du Kui, along with Fu Xuan (217-278) and Zhang Hua (232–300), for "correcting Caos' mistakes" (Wenxin Diaolong). A Song dynasty treatise (琴史) by Zhu Changwen (朱长文) mentioned that Du Kui had a son, Du Meng (杜孟). The information is nowhere corroborated. (Note: Northen Song scholar He Yuan's (何薳) Chun Zhu Ji Wen (《春渚纪闻》) recorded that Ji Kang learnt the Guangling san from Du Meng.)

Du Kui's apprentice, Chen Qi (陳頎; or Chen Hang [陳頏] (Note: Chen was known by this name in Du Kui's biography in Sanguozhi.)), was a mentor to Xun Xu (died 289), the leading court musician under Emperor Wu of the Jin dynasty. (Note: Xun Xu was mentioned together with Du Kui in vol.16 of the Book of Jin.)

== See also ==
- Lists of people of the Three Kingdoms
- Kui (Chinese mythology) (legendary music master)
