= Liu Yan (Han dynasty warlord) =

Eastern Han warlord (died 194)

- 劉焉

Governor of Yi Province (益州牧)
- In office 188 – 194
- Monarchs: Emperor Ling of Han / Emperor Xian of Han
- Succeeded by: Liu Zhang

Personal details
- Born: Unknown (Note: Although Liu Yan's birth year was not recorded, he should be at least in his 20s when his teacher Zhu Tian died in July 160. Thus, his birth year should be in the late 130s or before.) Qianjiang, Hubei
- Died: 194 Chengdu, Sichuan
- Children: Liu Fan; Liu Dan; Liu Mao; Liu Zhang
- Occupation: Politician, warlord
- Courtesy name: Junlang (君郎)
- Peerage: Marquis of Yangcheng (陽城侯)

Liu Yan (died 194 (Note: Liu Xie's biography in Book of the Later Han dated the battle between Han Sui, Ma Teng and Guo Si, Fan Chou to the 3rd month of the 1st year of the Xing'ping era. This corresponds to 9 April to 7 May 194 in the Julian calendar. Liu Yan's biographies in both Houhanshu and Sanguozhi indicated that he died after this incident.)), courtesy name Junlang, was a Chinese politician and warlord who lived in the late Eastern Han dynasty of China. He was also a member of the extended family of the Han emperors. Towards the end of his career he served as the governor of Yi Province (covering present-day Sichuan and Chongqing), which he developed into an independent power base. His domain was passed on to his son Liu Zhang, and eventually conquered by Liu Bei, who founded the state of Shu Han during the Three Kingdoms period.

== Life ==
Liu Yan was a descendant of Liu Yu, who was Prince of Lu in the early Han dynasty; his mother's surname was "Huang", (Note: Lai Min's biography in Sanguozhi recorded that his elder sister married Huang Wan (黃琬), a nephew of the paternal grandmother of Liu Zhang (and hence Liu Yan's mother); this meant that Liu Yan and Huang Wan were cousins as Liu's mother and Huang's father were siblings. It is likely, though not certain, that this Huang Wan was the Eastern Han official with the same name, who was a grandson of Huang Qiong, per vol.61 of Houhanshu; Huang Qiong's grandson died in prison at Chang'an after Li Jue and Guo Si seized control of the city.) and she was likely a daughter of Huang Qiong (黄琼; 86-164) and a granddaughter of Huang Xiang (黄香; 68-122), who was once Administrator of Wei Commandery. The name of Liu Yan's father was not recorded, but his moniker "Liu Changsha" suggests that he was an official at Changsha Commandery. (Note: The Taiping Yulan recorded that the tombs of Liu Yan's father and Huang Xiang were located in Zheng village (郑乡), which was the former capital of Zheng (modern-day Xinzheng). Huang Xiang being Huang Qiong's father was recorded in Qiong's biography in vol.61 of Houhanshu.) Because his branch of the Liu family was powerful, and because he proved himself to be an able statesman, he quickly rose through the ranks of the court. However, in July 160, with the death of his teacher Zhu Tian (祝恬), he resigned his position to observe a mourning period as per the traditions of the day. (Note: Liu Yan's biography in Sanguozhi only indicated that his teacher's surname was Zhu; it was Pei Songzhi who identified Master Zhu as Zhu Tian, who was situ before his death.) The highest post he reached was that of Minister of Ceremonies (太常), or person responsible for ceremonies related to the emperor. During the reign of Emperor Ling, the central court became a politically dangerous place, which Liu Yan wanted to distance himself from. Initially, Liu Yan wanted to be the Governor of Jiaozhi, but an adviser of his, Dong Fu (董扶), suggested that being the Governor of Yi Province, at that time considered a backward and distant province of the Han Empire, would be auspicious. Liu Yan took the advice, and with his private army set off for his new post in 188.

After arriving in Yi Province, Liu Yan was confronted with his first crisis. Ma Xiang (馬相) and Zhao Zhi (趙祗) started a rebellion in the region, claiming to be part of the Yellow Turban Rebellion. Liu Yan enlisted the help of powerful local families to raise an army and put down the rebellion.

Once firmly in control of the region, he plotted to gain independence from the central Han government. The first step in his plan was to send Zhang Lu and Zhang Xiu (張脩) to attack the forces of the official Han governor of Hanzhong, Su Gu (蘇固) and take over his territory. Zhang Lu first killed Zhang Xiu, and after absorbing the latter's armies he successfully managed to kill Su Gu and take control of the territory, which created an independent buffer state between Liu Yan's Yi Province and the Han central government.

His next step in gaining control of the region was to rein in the power of the local families, who had their own wealth and large private armies. He executed the leaders of over 10 families, but another powerful family leader Jia Long (賈龍) banded together with others and rebelled. Although the armies of the families were powerful, Liu Yan's forces eventually prevailed. The next threat was from the Qiang people, who attacked Liu Yan's capital of Mianzhu (綿竹). However, Liu Yan's forces were able to successfully defend their territory from being ravaged.

In c.April 194, when Li Jue and Guo Si gained control of Chang'an after Dong Zhuo's death, three of Liu Yan's sons (Liu Fan, Liu Dan, and Liu Zhang) were in Chang'an serving in various government posts. Liu Yan joined forces with Han Sui and Ma Teng in an attempt to attack the capital and seize it. With the help of his sons in the city, the armies attacked, but were defeated. In the hasty retreat, Liu Fan and Liu Dan were captured by Li Jue's forces as they tried to flee Chang'an, and were tortured and killed. Liu Zhang, however, barely managed to escape and join up with his father, who returned once again to Yi Province.

In summer of the same year, Liu Yan's residence in Mianzhu was struck by lightning and burnt down, forcing him to relocate the provincial capital to Chengdu. It is said that the grief caused by the loss of two sons and the stress from the Mianzhu fire caused him to develop an illness on his back, which would eventually cause his death later in the year.

His death left his fourth and youngest son Liu Zhang (Note: There is ambiguity in the birth order of Liu Zhang and Liu Mao in Sanguozhi. In Liu Yan's biography, Liu Mao was recorded as being Liu Yan's youngest son. However, in Liu Zhang's biography, Liu Mao became Liu Zhang's elder brother. Liu Zhang's biography in Houhanshu also indicated that he was younger than Liu Mao.) in control of Yi Province. (Note: In 208, when Cao Cao attacked Jingzhou, Liu Mao was alive at the start of the invasion, as Cao Cao recommended that he be granted a position as general. Liu Mao only died from illness after this.)

== Family ==
- Ancestor: Liu Yu, fifth son of Emperor Jing
- Mother: Lady Huang, probably a daughter of Huang Qiong and granddaughter of Huang Xiang.
- Wife/concubine: Lady Fei, paternal aunt of Fei Boren (费伯仁; a relative of Fei Yi) and mother of Liu Zhang.
- Sons:
  - Liu Fan (劉範), served as General of the Household of the Left, killed by Li Jue
  - Liu Dan (劉誕), served as Imperial Clerk Preparer of Documents, killed by Li Jue
  - Liu Mao (劉瑁), served as Senior Major, died from illness between late 208 and 214
  - Liu Zhang, inherited Liu Yan's position as Governor of Yi Province, lost Yi province to Liu Bei, joined Liu Bei, defected to Sun Quan, died shortly after the defection.
- Daughter-in-law:
  - Lady Wu (吳氏), Liu Mao's wife, married Liu Bei after her husband's death, posthumously known as Empress Mu

== In Romance of the Three Kingdoms ==
In the 14th-century historical novel Romance of the Three Kingdoms, Liu Yan was the governor of You Province in northern China during the events of the Yellow Turban Rebellion. He met Liu Bei, who rallied an army of volunteers to help him fight the Yellow Turban rebels. In Chen Shou's Records of the Three Kingdoms, however, there is no record of Liu Yan assuming governorship of You Province.

== See also ==
- Lists of people of the Three Kingdoms
