= Liu Zhang (warlord) =

Late 2nd/early 3rd century Eastern Han warlord

- 劉璋
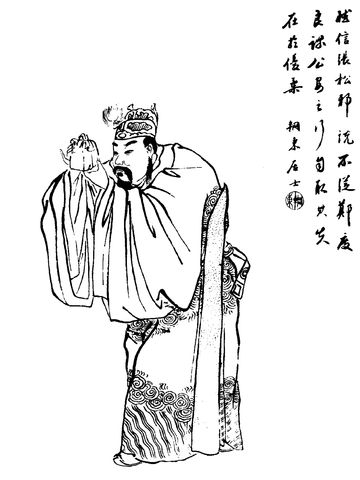
- A Qing dynasty illustration of Liu Zhang

General Who Inspires Might (振威將軍)
- In office c. 214 – c. 220
- Monarch: Emperor Xian of Han

Governor of Yi Province (益州牧)
- In office c. 194 – 214
- Monarch: Emperor Xian of Han
- Preceded by: Liu Yan
- Succeeded by: Liu Bei

Inspector of Yi Province (益州刺史)
- In office c. 194
- Monarch: Emperor Xian of Han

Personal details
- Born: Unknown Qianjiang, Hubei
- Died: c. 220 (Note: Guan Yu was killed in January or February 220. Since Liu Zhang died shortly after this incident, he likely died in 220.)
- Children: Liu Xun; Liu Chan; Fei Guan's wife
- Parent: Liu Yan (father)
- Relatives: Lady Wu (sister-in-law); Pang Xi (in-laws) (Note: Pang Xi's daughter married Liu Xun, Liu Zhang's elder son.)
- Occupation: Politician, warlord
- Courtesy name: Jiyu (季玉)

Liu Zhang (fl. 190–219), courtesy name Jiyu, was a Chinese politician and warlord who served as a provincial governor during the late Eastern Han dynasty of China. He became the Governor of Yi Province (covering present-day Sichuan and Chongqing), succeeding his father Liu Yan and ruled the region until 214, when he then surrendered to Liu Bei. Six years later, Liu Zhang again surrendered to Eastern Wu, and died shortly afterwards. Liu Zhang is often considered an incapable leader but is noted to have been the original lord of some of Shu Han's most famous generals and officials such as Fa Zheng, Meng Da, Zhang Ni, Liu Ba, Huang Quan, Wu Yi, Li Yan, Dong He and others.

== Early life ==
Like his father, Liu Zhang was a descendant of Liu Yu, who was Prince of Lu in the early Han dynasty.

The youngest son of Liu Yan, Liu Zhang spent his early career at the Han imperial court as an assistant to his two eldest brothers, Liu Fan and Liu Dan. They served at the court when it was controlled by the warlords Li Jue and Guo Si. Liu Zhang was sent by the imperial court to admonish his father for brutal actions, but upon arriving his father refused to let him go back to the imperial court.

== Governorship of Yi Province ==
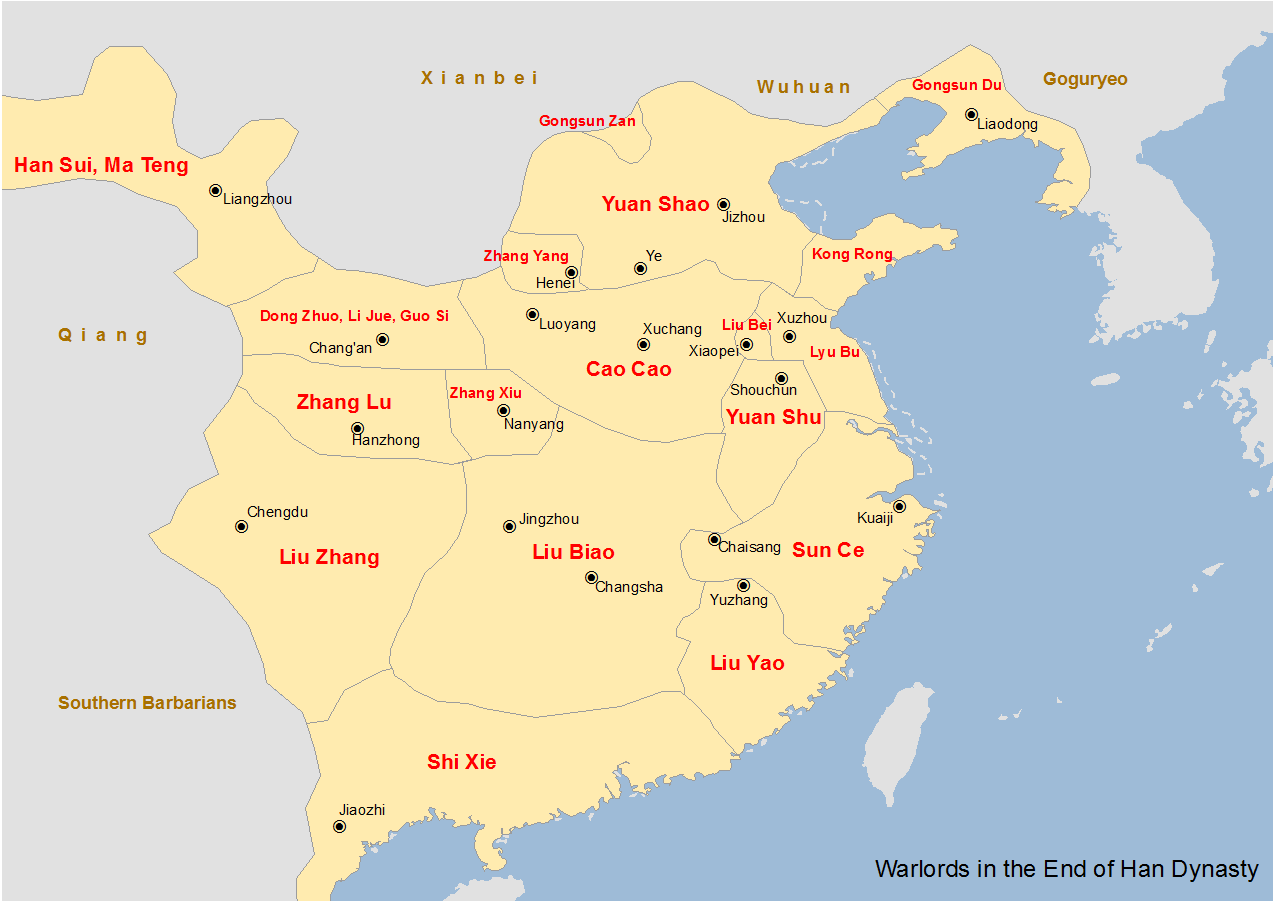
Map showing the major warlords of the Han dynasty in the 190s, including Liu Zhang

In 194, following the deaths of two of his elder brothers at the hands of Li Jue's forces (though Liu Zhang's brother Liu Mao was still alive at this time), (Note: It is unclear if Liu Mao was older or younger than Liu Zhang. In Liu Yan's biography in Sanguozhi, Liu Mao was recorded as being Liu Yan's youngest son. However, in Liu Zhang's biography in the same work and Houhanshu, Liu Mao became Liu Zhang's elder brother.) Liu Zhang was nominated to take over the governorship of Yi Province by Liu Yan's ministers Zhao Wei (赵韪) and Wang Shang (王商) along with other members of the gentry of Yi Province, due to Liu Zhang's timid and kindly nature.

Following Liu Zhang's succession, former subordinates Shen Mi (沈彌) and Lou Fa (婁發) rebelled, aided by Gan Ning and receiving support from Liu He (劉闔), an official from the neighbouring Jing Province. However, they failed and were forced to flee to Jing Province.

During his rule over Yi Province, Liu Zhang's soft and timid nature and lack of decisiveness led to widespread resentment from the people of Yi Province. Due to Liu Zhang's laxity, his laws and authority was too feeble to control the clans and officials of Yi, while Liu Yan's former army composed of refugees of Nanyang and regions around Chang'an, named the Dongzhou military (東州兵), subjugated and bullied the local people. Zhao Wei used the opportunity to earn people's trust behind Liu Zhang's back. Due to the resentment of the people of Yi, Zhao Wei then established relations with the eminent families of Jing Province, intending to raise arms against Liu Zhang.

In 200, Zhao Wei began his rebellion against Liu Zhang. Liu Zhang fortified within Chengdu. The Dongzhou military, fearing for their potential loss if Liu Zhang was defeated, came to Liu Zhang's aid. The combined forces beat back Zhao Wei, forcing him to retreat to Jiangzhou, where he would die soon after.

In the same year, Zhang Lu, who had previously recognised Liu Yan as his master, also rebelled against Liu Zhang. Liu Zhang had Zhang Lu's mother, and younger brother(s) executed; the pair became enemies from this point on.

In late 208, Liu Zhang received news that Cao Cao was attacking Jingzhou and had already occupied Hanzhong. He dispatched Yin Pu (阴溥) as an emissary to pay homage to Cao. Cao then recommended that Liu Zhang and his brother Liu Mao (husband of Lady Wu) be granted positions as generals. Liu Mao later died from illness.

In 211, at the suggestion of his adviser Zhang Song, he asked Liu Bei to come to his assistance in the battle against Zhang Lu. The welcoming of Liu Bei was a plan by Zhang Song, Fa Zheng and Meng Da to ultimately make him their leader, since they considered him more ambitious and worthy of serving than Liu Zhang. Wang Lei (王累), Huang Quan, Li Hui and others tried to persuade Liu Zhang not to accept Liu Bei into his territory, but their pleas were ignored and Liu Bei was welcomed as a guest of Liu Zhang where he would go to the front to fight against Zhang Lu.

When Zhang Song's true intentions were revealed to Liu Zhang by Zhang Song's elder brother Zhang Su, he executed Zhang Song and began his battle against Liu Bei, who then began his conquest of Yi Province. Although generals such as Zhang Ren fought hard to defend their master, Liu Bei's forces had the upper hand, and by 214 they had surrounded Yi Province's capital, Chengdu. Liu Zhang's advisers Liu Ba, Dong He and Hu Jing pleaded to their master to resist at all costs, but Liu Zhang rejected their pleas, saying "I don't want my subjects to suffer any more." He then surrendered to Liu Bei.

== Later life ==
Soon after surrendering his territory, Liu Bei sent Liu Zhang and his second son Liu Chan to the western part of Jing Province, on the border with Sun Quan's territory. In the winter of 219-220, however, forces led by Lü Meng, a subordinate of Sun Quan, captured Liu Bei's general Guan Yu and executed him, seizing Jing Province. Liu Zhang and Liu Chan were taken in by the Wu forces, and Sun Quan, seeking to establish a claim to the rest of Liu Bei's territory, appointed Liu Zhang as the Governor of Yi Province, which was his previous appointment before Liu Bei seized it from him. However, Sun Quan made no further attempts to invade Liu Bei's territory, and Liu Zhang died shortly after becoming a vassal under Sun Quan. Liu Chan continued to serve in Eastern Wu while Liu Xun served in Shu Han.

== Family ==
Liu Zhang's paternal grandmother Lady Huang was a paternal aunt of Huang Wan (黃琬); Huang was Lai Min's brother-in-law, as he married Lai's elder sister. When Liu Zhang heard that Lai Min and his elder sister were in Jing Province, he sent people to fetch them to Yi Province. Lai Min followed his sister to Yi Province, where Liu Zhang treated him like a guest. Lady Huang was likely a daughter of Huang Qiong (黄琼) and a granddaughter of Huang Xiang (黄香), who was once Administrator of Wei Commandery. The name of Liu Zhang's grandfather was not recorded, but his moniker "Liu Changsha" suggests that he was an official at Changsha Commandery. His mother Lady Fei was a paternal aunt of Fei Boren (费伯仁), a relative of Fei Yi.

Liu Zhang had at least two sons. His eldest son, Liu Xun (劉循), served as a General of the Household of Equipage in the Shu Han state during the Three Kingdoms period. His second son, Liu Chan (劉闡), accompanied his father to Jing Province after their defeat by Liu Bei and served as Palace Assistant Imperial Clerk (御史中丞) in Eastern Wu during the Three Kingdoms period.

== Historical evaluation ==
In popular accounts of the period, such as the 14th-century historical novel Romance of the Three Kingdoms, Liu Zhang is portrayed as a foolish and incapable ruler.

In Chen Shou's Records of the Three Kingdoms, contemporary accounts evaluate Liu Zhang as being benevolent and unambitious but weak-willed and ineffectual ruler, who lacked the authority and decisiveness to sufficiently control and administer the state. His modesty safeguarded Yi Province from the outside; his leniency led to many internal troubles and disloyalty in his state.

== See also ==
- Lists of people of the Three Kingdoms
