= Government of the Han dynasty =

Governance during the Chinese Han dynasty (202 BC–220 AD)

Provinces and commanderies at the end of the Eastern Han dynasty in 219 AD

The Han dynasty (202 BC – 220 AD) was the second imperial dynasty of China, following the Qin dynasty (221–207 BC). It was divided into the periods of Western (Former) Han (202 BC – 9 AD) and Eastern (Later) Han (25–220 AD), briefly interrupted by the Xin dynasty (9–23 AD) of Wang Mang. The capital of Western Han was Chang'an, and the capital of Eastern Han was Luoyang. The emperor headed the government, promulgating all written laws, serving as commander-in-chief of the armed forces, and presiding as the chief executive official. He appointed all government officials who earned a salary of 600 bushels of grain or more (though these salaries were largely paid in coin cash) with the help of advisors who reviewed each nominee. The empress dowager could either be the emperor's actual or symbolic mother, and was in practice more respected than the emperor, as she could override his decisions; she could even make decisions on behalf of the emperor in dilemma matters of the country or for the order and continuation of the dynasty. If necessary, with the support of the courtiers, she would decide on his successor or his dismissal, although such a challenge was only raised by the empress dowager to the emperor during the emperor's youth or incapacity. The emperor's executive powers could also be practiced by any official upon whom he bestowed the Staff of Authority. These powers included the right to execute criminals without the imperial court's permission.

Near the beginning of the dynasty, semi-autonomous regional kings rivaled the emperor's authority. This autonomy was greatly diminished when the imperial court enacted reforms following the threats to central control like the Rebellion of the Seven States. The end of the Han dynasty came about during a time of civil, military and religious upheaval, which resulted in the period of Three Kingdoms.

The highest officials in the central bureaucracy, who provided advisory, censorial, executive, and judicial roles in governing the empire, consisted of cabinet members known as the Excellencies, heads of large specialized ministries known as the Nine Ministers, and various metropolitan officials of the capital region. (Note: Most of the English renditions of the Chinese titles used in this article are taken from Rafe de Crespigny's A Biographical Dictionary of Later Han to the Three Kingdoms (2007); alternative renditions are provided in parentheses and are taken from Hans Bielenstein's The Bureaucracy of Han Times (1980) and Wang Yu-ch'uan's An Outline of The Central Government of The Former Han Dynasty (1949). Note that sometimes there is only one variant English title in the parentheses; this means that Bielenstein and Wang used the same English rendition. See Translation of Han dynasty titles for a list of different renditions.) Distinguished salary-ranks were granted to officials in the bureaucracy, nobles of the imperial family, concubines of the harem, and military officers of the armed forces.

Local government divisions, in descending order by size, were the province, commandery, county, and district. Local fiefs of the nobility included the kingdom, which was modeled largely upon the regular commandery, as well as the marquessate, modelled largely upon the regular county. Although the central government's monopolies on salt, iron, and liquor eventually failed and were relinquished back to private production, the government successfully nationalized the issuing of coin currency through its imperial mint, which lasted from 113 BC until the end of the dynasty. The conscription system for commoners as non-professional soldiers was reduced in size in favor of a volunteer army and a substitution tax by Eastern Han. A small professional standing army existed throughout Western and Eastern Han. During times of crisis, the volunteer army increased in size, but large militias were raised and certain officer titles were revived for temporary use.

== Salaries ==
During the Han dynasty, the power a government official exercised was determined by his annual salary-rank, measured in grain units known as dan, shi or shih (石, a unit of volume, approximately 35 litres (0.99 US bsh)). However, approximately half an official's salary in grain was made in payments of cash coins, the standard of which, after 119 BC, was the wushu (五銖) coin measuring 3.2 g (0.11 oz). The other half of an official's salary consisted of unhusked grain and husked grain measured in hu (觳, approximately 20 L / 676 oz); since one hu of unhusked grain was equal to 100 coins and one hu of husked grain was equal to 160 coins, the conversion ratio for unhusked grain to husked grain was 10 to 6 (see table below). The most senior officials in central government earned a 10,000-dan salary. The officials who oversaw nine specialized ministries each earned the Fully 2,000-dan rank, while the magistrate of a county earned a 600-dan rank. Occasionally, emperors bestowed luxurious gifts of wine, foodstuffs, and silk clothes upon high officials. These gifts, in some generous cases, could equal as much as half the value of the officials' standard annual salary. Aged officials were often retired from service and given a pension. Below is a table outlining salaries measured in coin cash, unhusked grain, and husked grain for the highest to lowest-paid officials in Han officialdom:

Salary list of 106 AD
A. Rank (measured in dan)	B. Monthly Salary in Unhusked Grain (measured in hu)	C. Monthly Salary in Coin (standard currency)	D. Monthly Salary in Husked Grain (measured in hu)	E. C divided by half-value of B (measured in cash per hu)	F. Ratio of D to half-value of B
10,000	350	17,500	105	100	60%
Fully 2,000	180	9,000	54	100	60%
2,000	120	6,000	36	100	60%
Equivalent to 2,000	100	5,000	30	100	60%
1,000	90	4,500	27	100	60%
Equivalent to 1,000	80	4,000	24	100	60%
600	70	3,500	21	100	60%
Equivalent to 600	60	3,000	18	100	60%
400	50	2,500	15	100	60%
Equivalent to 400	45	2,250	13.5	100	60%
300	40	2,000	12	100	60%
Equivalent to 300	37	1,850	11.1	100	60%
200	30	1,500	9	100	60%
Equivalent to 200	27	1,350	8.1	100	60%
100	16	800	4.8	100	60%
Equivalent to 100	N/A	N/A	N/A	N/A	N/A
Officials Whose Salaries are in Terms of Dou	11	550	3.3	100	60%
Accessory Clerks	8	400	2.4	100	60%

== Central government ==
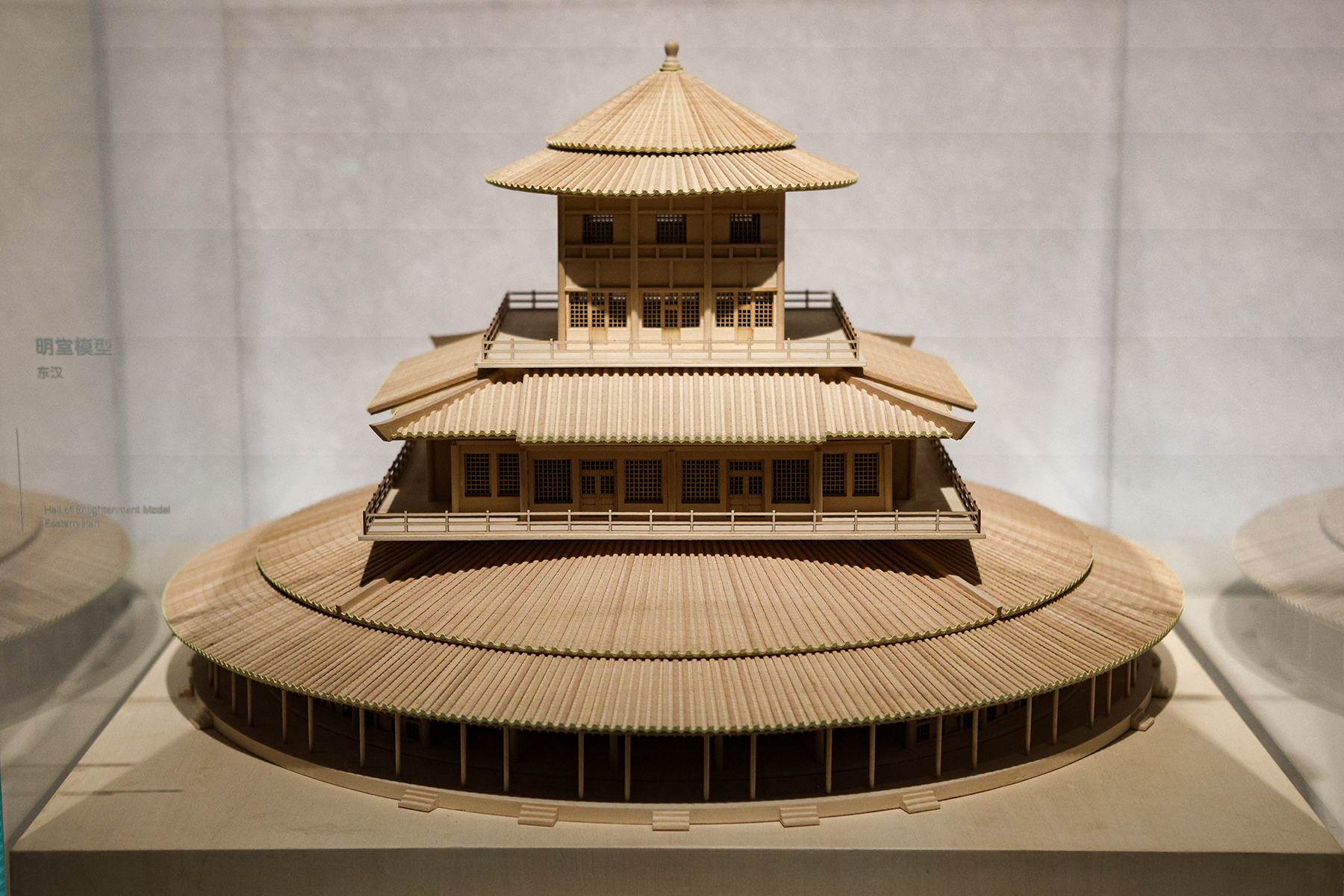
Model reconstruction of Bright Hall (明堂) of Luoyang during the Han dynasty, the central ritual building for important ceremonies.

=== Emperor ===
==== Qin's imperial model ====
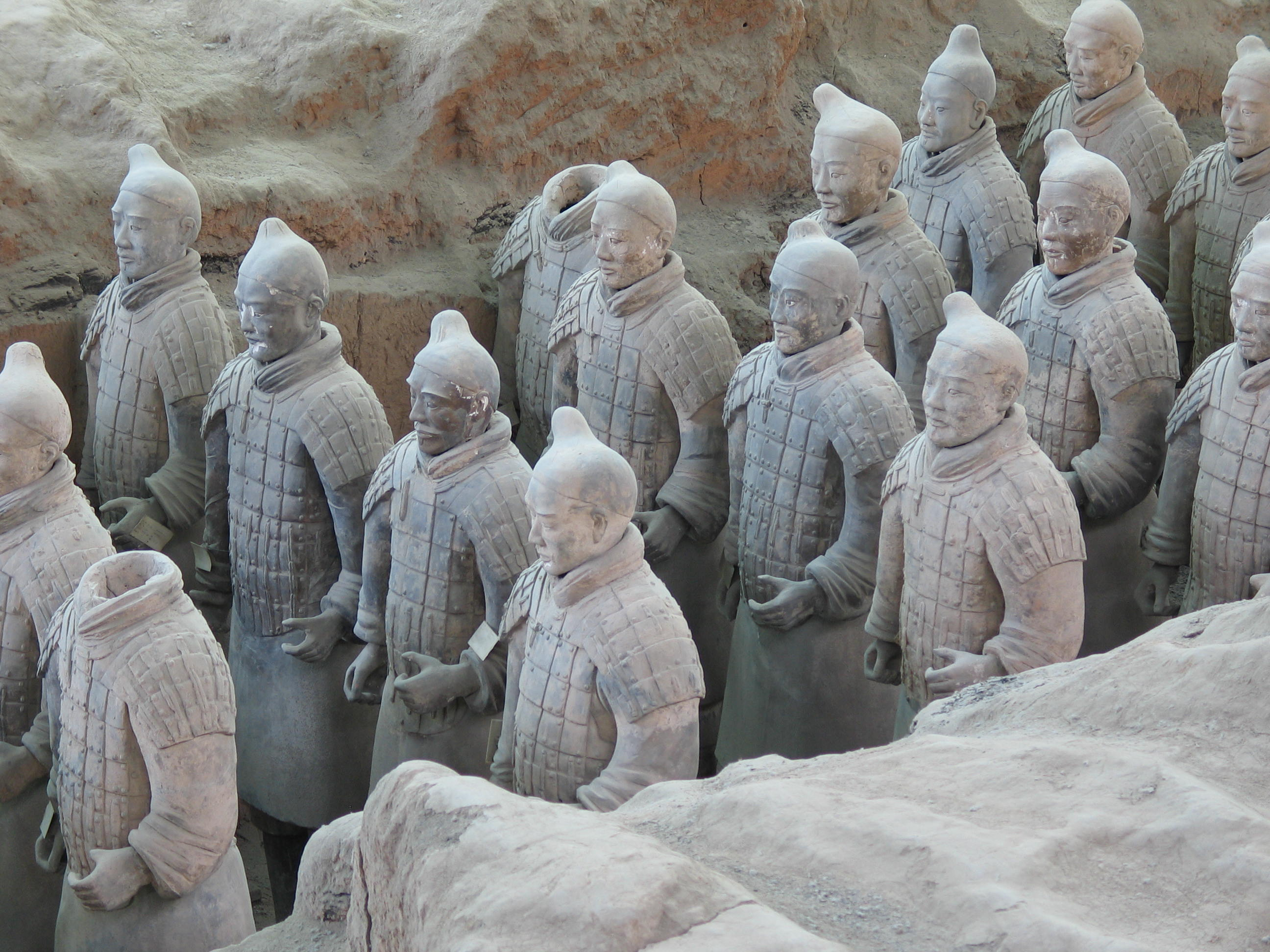
The Terracotta Army, assembled by 210 BC for the burial of Qin Shi Huang (r. 221–210 BC), the first emperor of the Qin dynasty

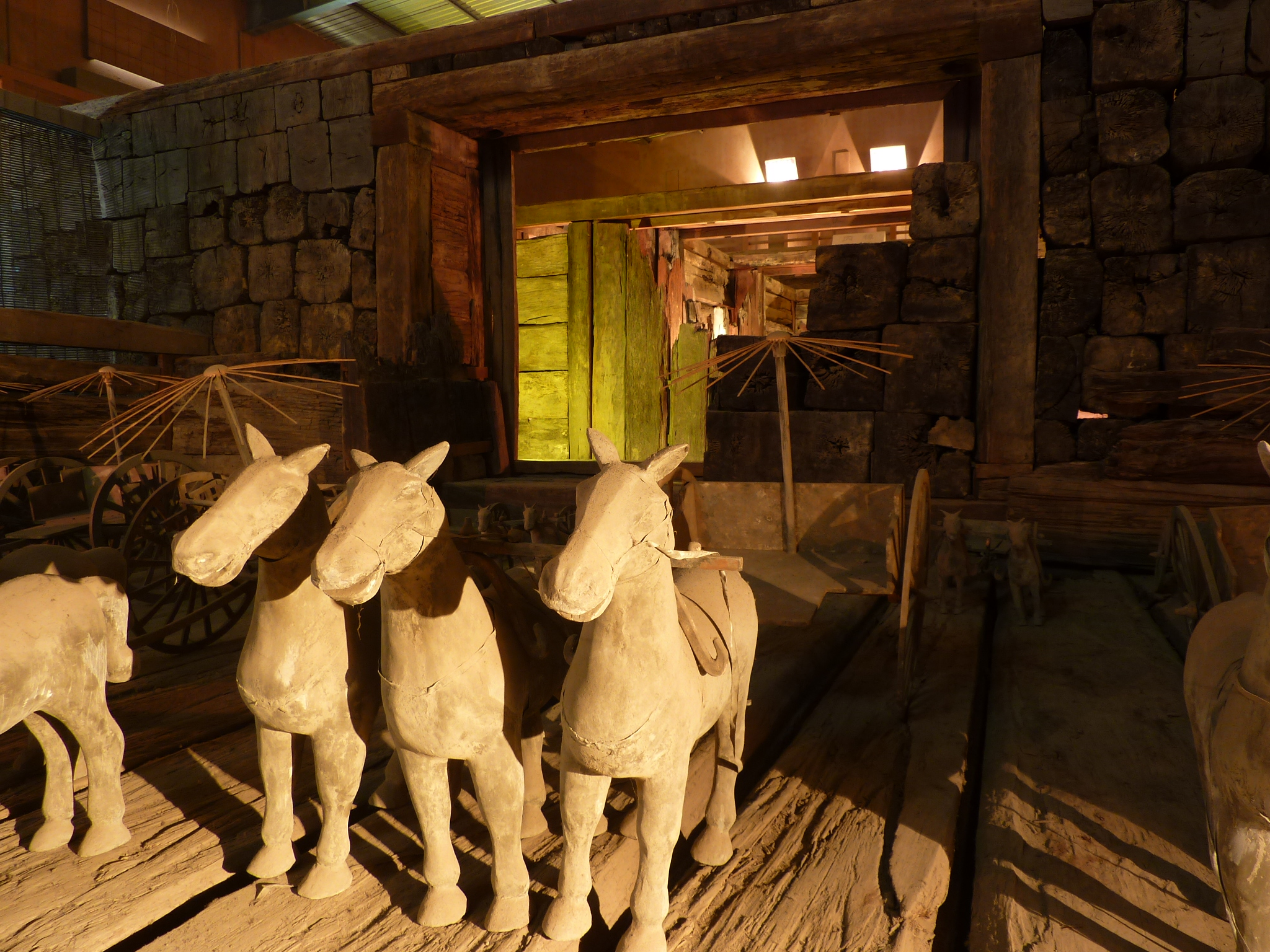
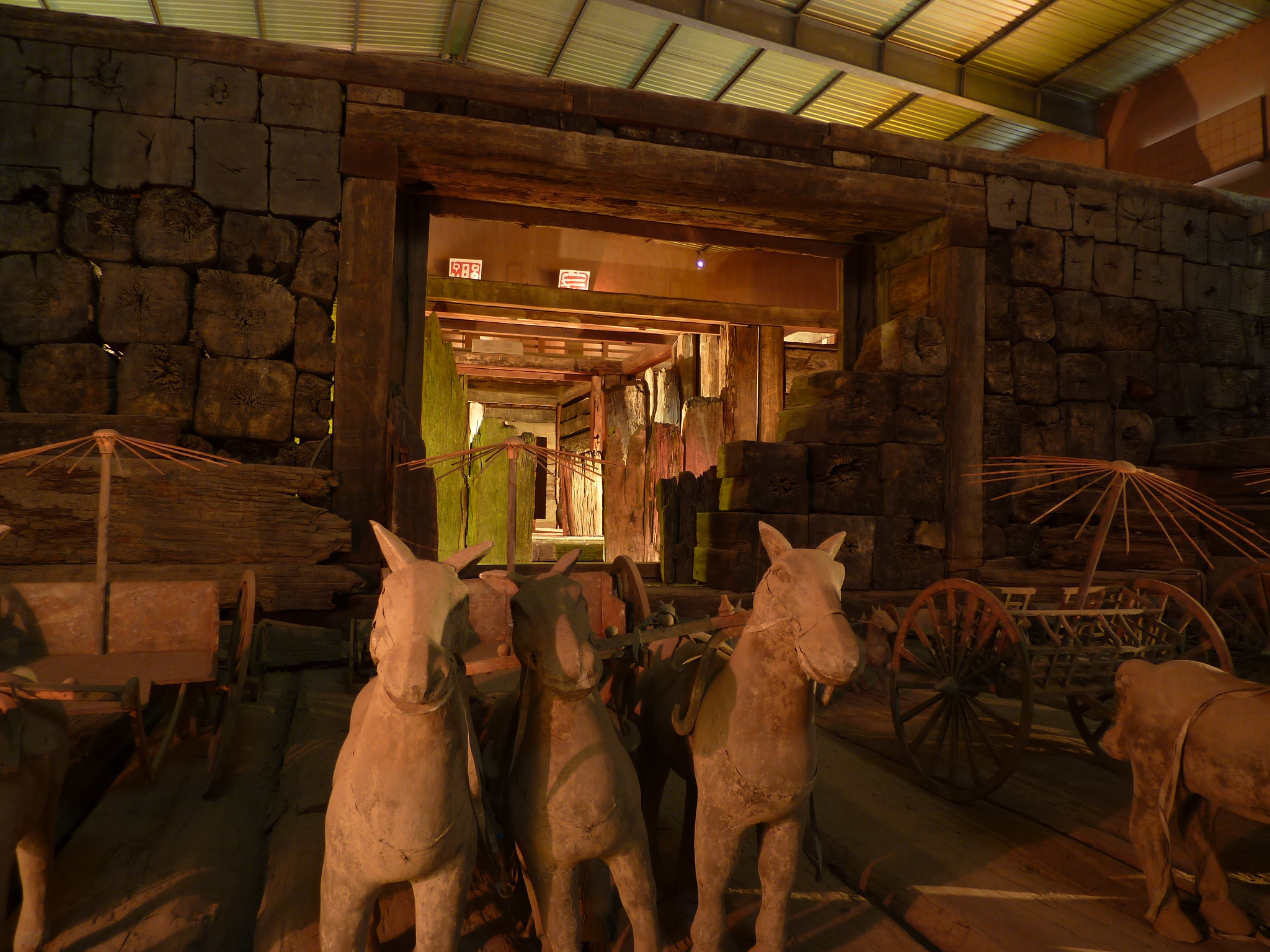
Ceramic statues of horse-drawn chariots from the tomb of the wife of Liu Xu (劉胥), Prince Li of Guangling (廣陵厲王), a son of Emperor Wu of Han who committed suicide in 53 BC

Qin Shi Huang, the first ruler of the Qin dynasty, established China's imperial system of government in 221 BC after unifying the Seven Warring States through conquest, bringing to an end the Warring States period. For a time, the rulers of the warring states claimed nominal allegiance to an overlord king of the Zhou dynasty (c. 1050 – 256 BC), yet the Zhou kings' political power and prestige was less than that of later Chinese emperors. The imperial system fell apart after the fall of Qin in 206 BC. However, following Han's victory over Chu, the King of Han reestablished the imperial system and is known posthumously as Emperor Gaozu (r. 202–195 BC).

The Han system of imperial government borrowed many of its core features from the regime established by the Qin dynasty. For example, Gaozu's Chancellor Xiao He (d. 193 BC) integrated much of the statutes of the Qin law code into the newly compiled Han law code. Yet Gaozu's establishment of central control over only a third of the empire—the other two-thirds of territory was controlled by semi-autonomous kingdoms—strayed from Qin's imperial model which gave the emperor direct control over all of China. However, a series of reforms eventually stripped away any vestiges of the kingdoms' independence. Han emperors thereafter enjoyed full and direct control over China, as had the first Qin emperor. The Han court's gradual move towards reestablishing central control can also be seen in its monetary policy. While the Qin regime installed a nationwide standard currency, the early Western Han regime oscillated between abolishing and legalizing private mints, commandery-level mints, and kingdom-level mints issuing various coins. In 113 BC the Han court finally established the central government's monopoly control over the issuance of a standard, nationwide currency.

==== Roles, rights, and responsibilities ====
The emperor, who enjoyed paramount social status, was the head of the government administration. His rule was virtually absolute, although civil officials, representing the competing interests of different state organs, scrutinized his decisions. Although the Grand Commandant had a nominal role as commander-in-chief, the emperor served as the commander-in-chief of the armed forces. The emperor had the sole right to appoint central government officials whose salary-rank was 600-dan or higher. The emperor also appointed the leading officials at the provincial, commandery, and county levels of government. Appointees to office were usually recommended men from the commanderies, family relatives of high officials, or student graduates of the Imperial University. This institution was established in 124 BC, and provided a Confucian-based education for those entering civil service.

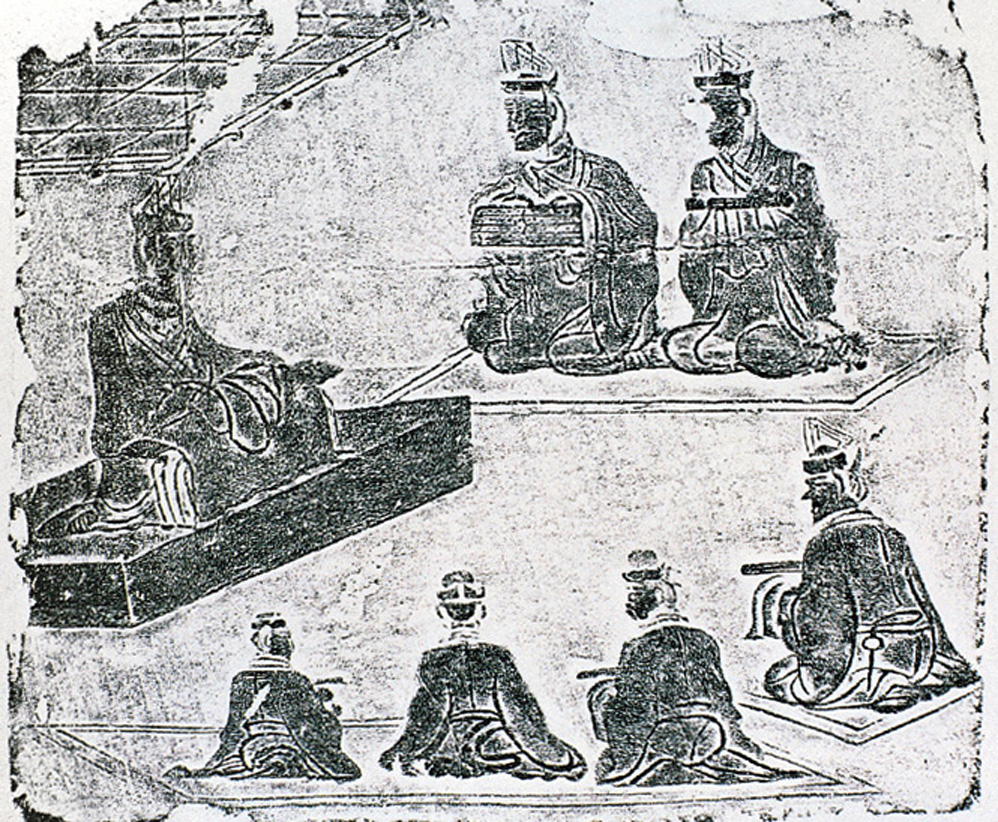
Scholars depicted on Han dynasty pictorial brick, discovered in Chengdu. Scholars wore hats called "Jinxian Guan" (进贤冠) to denominate educational status.

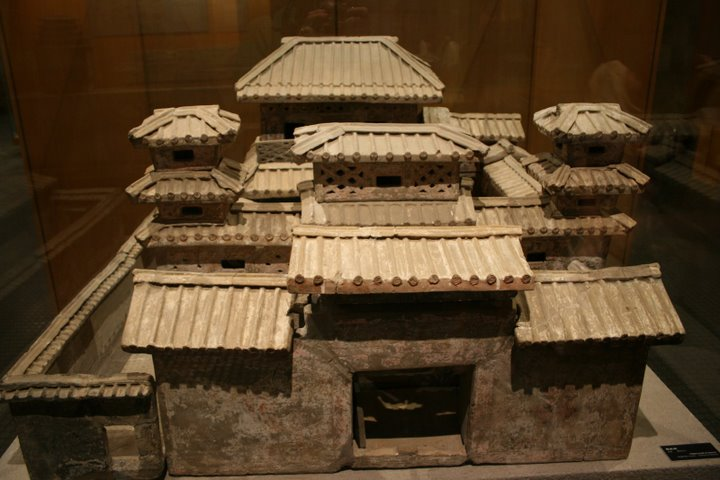
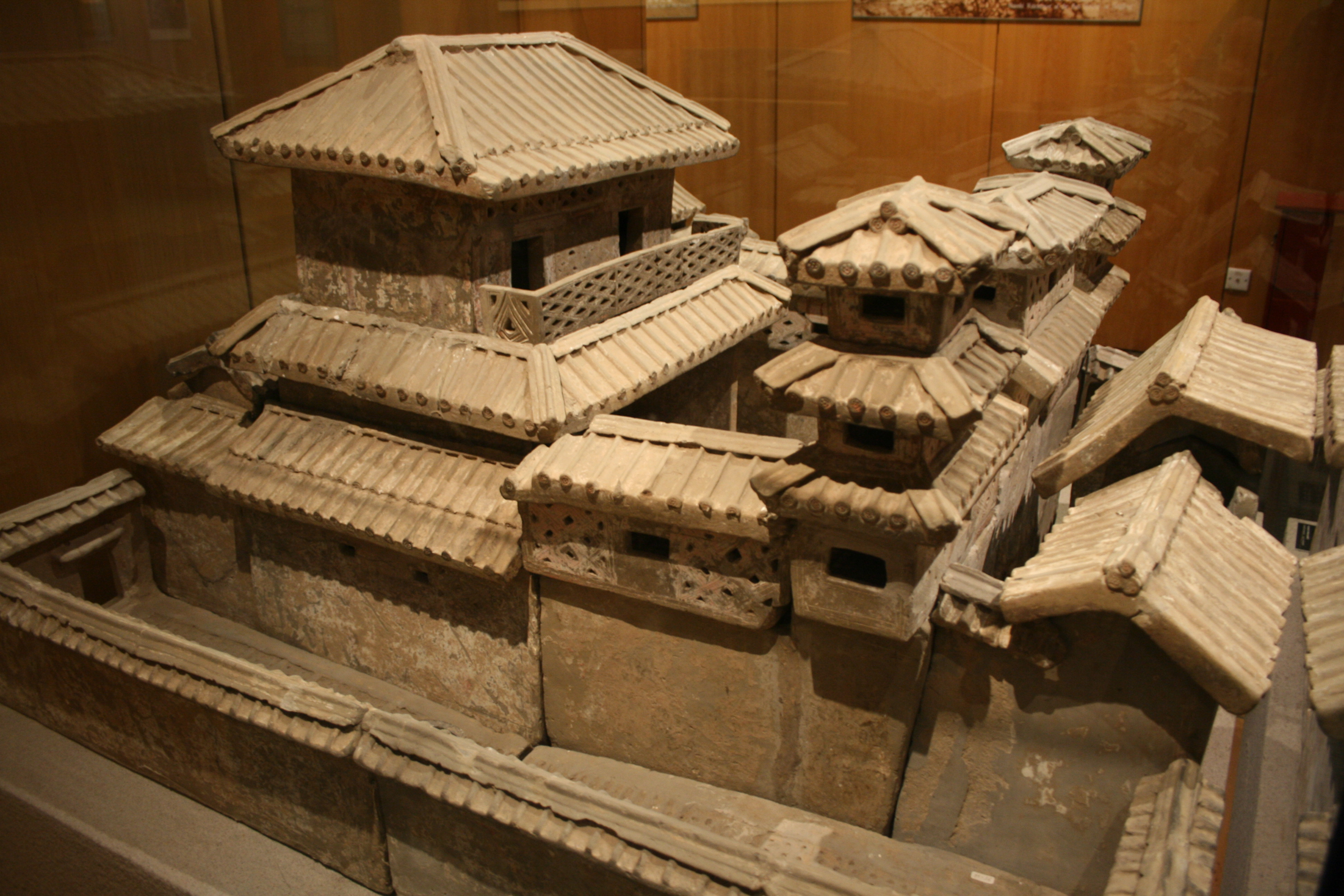
A pottery model of a palace from a Han dynasty tomb; the entrances to the emperor's imperial palaces were strictly guarded by the Minister of the Guards, and if it was found that a commoner, official, or noble entered without explicit permission via a tally system, they were liable for execution.

The emperor had the exclusive right to modify the law code and issue new laws in the form of imperial edicts (zhao 詔) and decrees (ling 令). However, he often accepted the decisions and reforms suggested by his chief judicial minister, the Commandant of Justice. The emperor also acted as the supreme judge. Any lawsuits which a county administration, then commandery administration, and then Minister of Justice could not resolve were deferred to the emperor.

The emperor's role as supreme judge could be temporarily duplicated by any official he designated in times of emergency or in distant borderlands where central government had little influence. This entailed a symbolic conferral of power, which was embodied in the Staff of Authority (Jiezhang 節杖). Roughly 2 m (6 ft) in height and decorated with ribbons, the Staff of Authority was often granted to an official with a specific errand, such as acting on behalf of the emperor as ambassador to a foreign country, appointing civilians to office, or immediately promoting a deserving military officer on the field of battle. Moreover, it granted its bearer the authority to sentence criminals and political rebels with execution without notifying the court first.

During the Qin dynasty, the first Qin emperor's legitimacy to rule was ultimately decided by his ability to conquer others. However, by the time of Wang Mang's (r. 9–23 AD) reign, the Mandate of Heaven was considered the only legitimate source of imperial authority. This concept was given greater prominence after the state officially sponsored the worship of Heaven over that of the Five Powers in 31 BC. Moreover, the philosophy of the scholar Dong Zhongshu (179–104 BC), which held that a dynasty's rule on earth was bound to greater cosmological cycles in the universe, was officially sponsored by the Han court from Emperor Wu's (r. 141–87 BC) reign onward. The emperor was expected to behave according to proper ritual, ethics, and morals, lest he incur the wrath of Heaven and bring an end to his reign. He became the highest priest in the land. By performing certain religious rites and rituals, the emperor acted as a sacred link between Heaven and Earth.

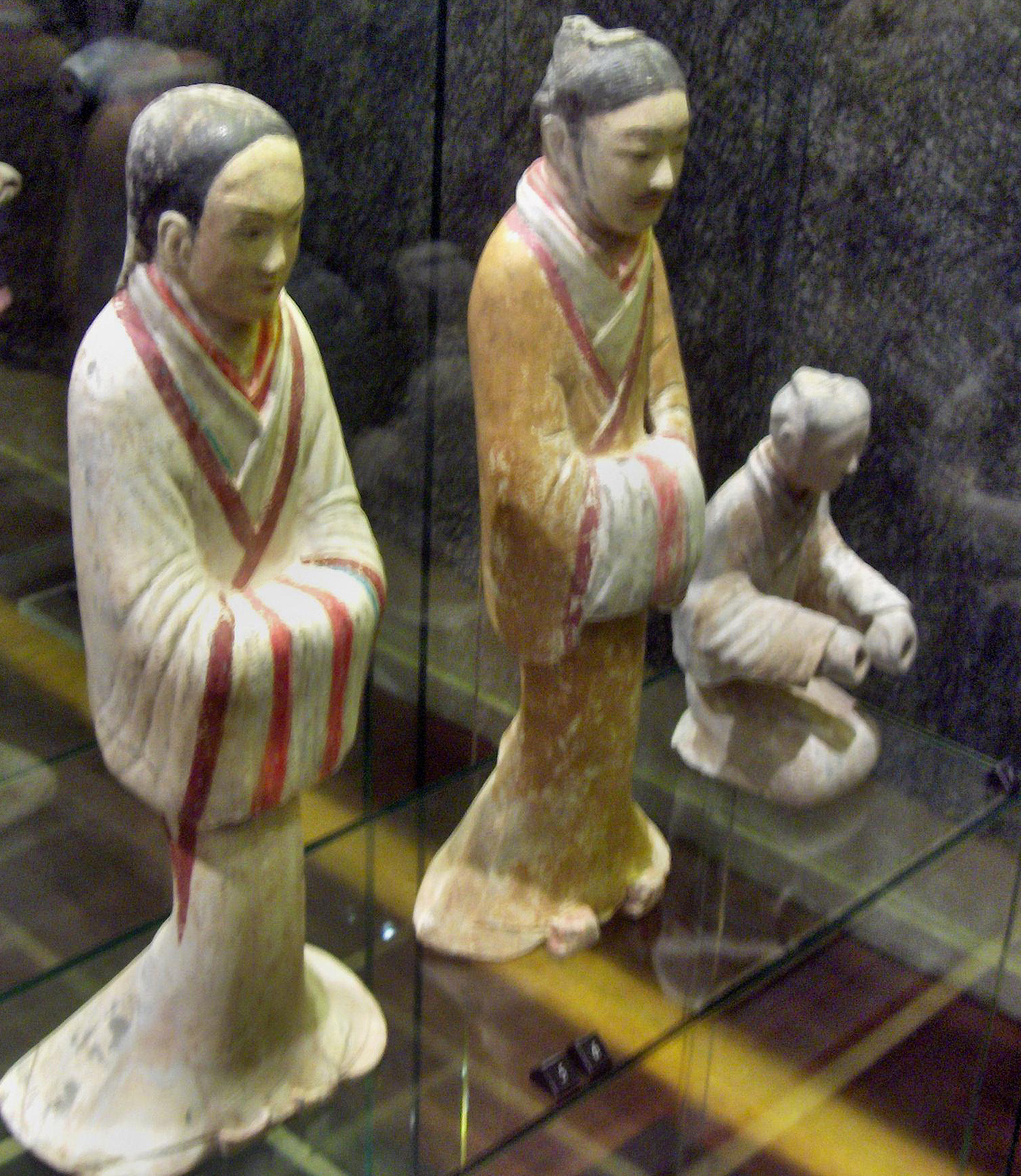
A female servant and male advisor dressed in silk robes, ceramic figurines from the Western Han Era

==== Court conferences ====
Although the emperor held supreme power, he more often sought the advice of his cabinet and other ministers before making decisions and when revoking them. He often assembled leading officials for debates or discussions on policy, known as court conferences (tingyi 廷議). Various issues were debated at these gatherings, such as installment of new emperors, enfeoffment of nobles, the establishment of new ancestral temples, reforms to the state religion, the monetary or tax systems, management of government monopolies on salt and iron (when they existed during Western Han), the introduction of new laws or the repeal of old ones, complex lawsuits, or whether or not to declare war on a foreign country or accept peaceful negotiation. Although the emperor could reject the decisions reached by his court conference, he did so at the risk of alienating his leading ministers. More often than not, he was forced to accept the majority consensus of his ministers, whose individual opinions were equally tallied regardless of their standing or salary-rank.

=== Empress dowager ===
When the emperor died without officially appointing a successor, his widow, the empress dowager, had the sole right to appoint one of the late emperor's surviving sons or relatives to the position. Most often the successor chosen in this fashion was a minor, thus the empress dowager served as regent over the government. A high-status male relative, usually a father or brother, would assume control of the Imperial Secretariat. Even when an emperor reached his majority and became an active ruler, he often sought the advice and acceptance of the empress dowager on policy decisions; she also had the right to override his decisions. The empress dowager was protected by the Minister of the Guards, yet if her faction—the consort clan— was removed from power, he was then responsible for keeping her under house arrest.

=== Grand Tutor ===
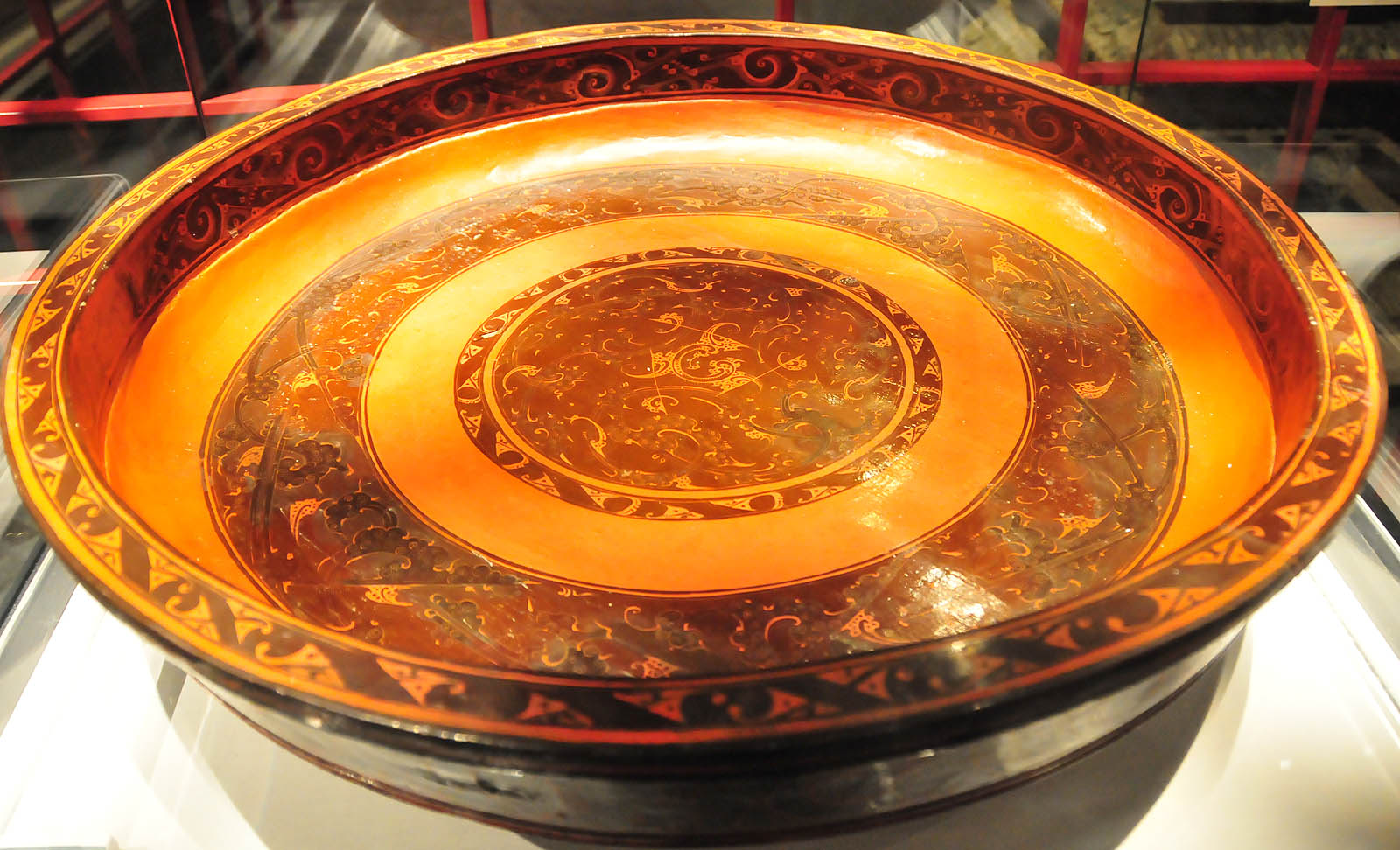
A black-and-red Han dynasty lacquerware tray with painted designs; rich and wealthy officials could afford luxury items such as lacquerwares, which were also produced for the emperor's dining table by government workshops headed by the Minister Steward, one of Nine Ministers.

The post of Grand Tutor (Taifu 太傅), although given the highest civil status below the emperor, was not regularly occupied. The role was considered an honorary rather than substantive office. In Western Han, a Grand Tutor was supposedly appointed at the beginning of each emperor's reign, and was not replaced until that emperor's death. However, only four Grand Tutors were appointed from 202 BC – 6 AD. In contrast, during Eastern Han, every emperor, except Emperor Huan of Han (r. 146–168 AD), had a new Grand Tutor appointed at the beginning of their reigns. The Grand Tutor's salary-rank was unspecified in literary sources, although it was likely higher than the 10,000-dan rank. The Grand Tutor was nominally in charge of providing a young emperor with moral guidance, but it is doubtful that this role was ever taken seriously or formally conducted. The post often served to deliberately block someone from obtaining a more important post, such as one of the Excellencies, while Grand Tutors were usually elder statesmen chosen for their age rather than merits (so they would die off quickly after being appointed).

=== Excellencies ===
==== Title variations ====
The Excellencies (gong, literally translated as "dukes") were the foremost officials in central government who formed the cabinet during both Western and Eastern Han. For most of Western Han, the Excellencies were the Chancellor (Chengxiang 丞相), the Imperial Counselor (Yushi dafu 御史大夫), and the Grand Commandant (Taiwei 太尉). The Great Commandant's post was irregularly filled, and it was retitled to Grand Marshal (Da sima 大司馬) in 119 BC. In 8 BC, the post of Imperial Counselor was abolished in favor of a Grand Excellency of Works (da sikong 大司空), and by 1 BC the Chancellor's post was abolished and replaced by the Grand Excellency Over the Masses (da situ 大司徒). On 8 June, 51 AD the prefix "Grand" (大) was removed from the titles of the Excellency over the Masses and Excellency of Works, while the Grand Marshal was reinstated with the original title of Grand Commandant, and would remain so for the rest of Eastern Han. The exact salary figures for the Excellencies before 8 BC are unknown, although from that year forward they were given a 10,000-dan salary-rank, in addition to periodic gifts which further boosted their incomes.

==== Chancellor ====
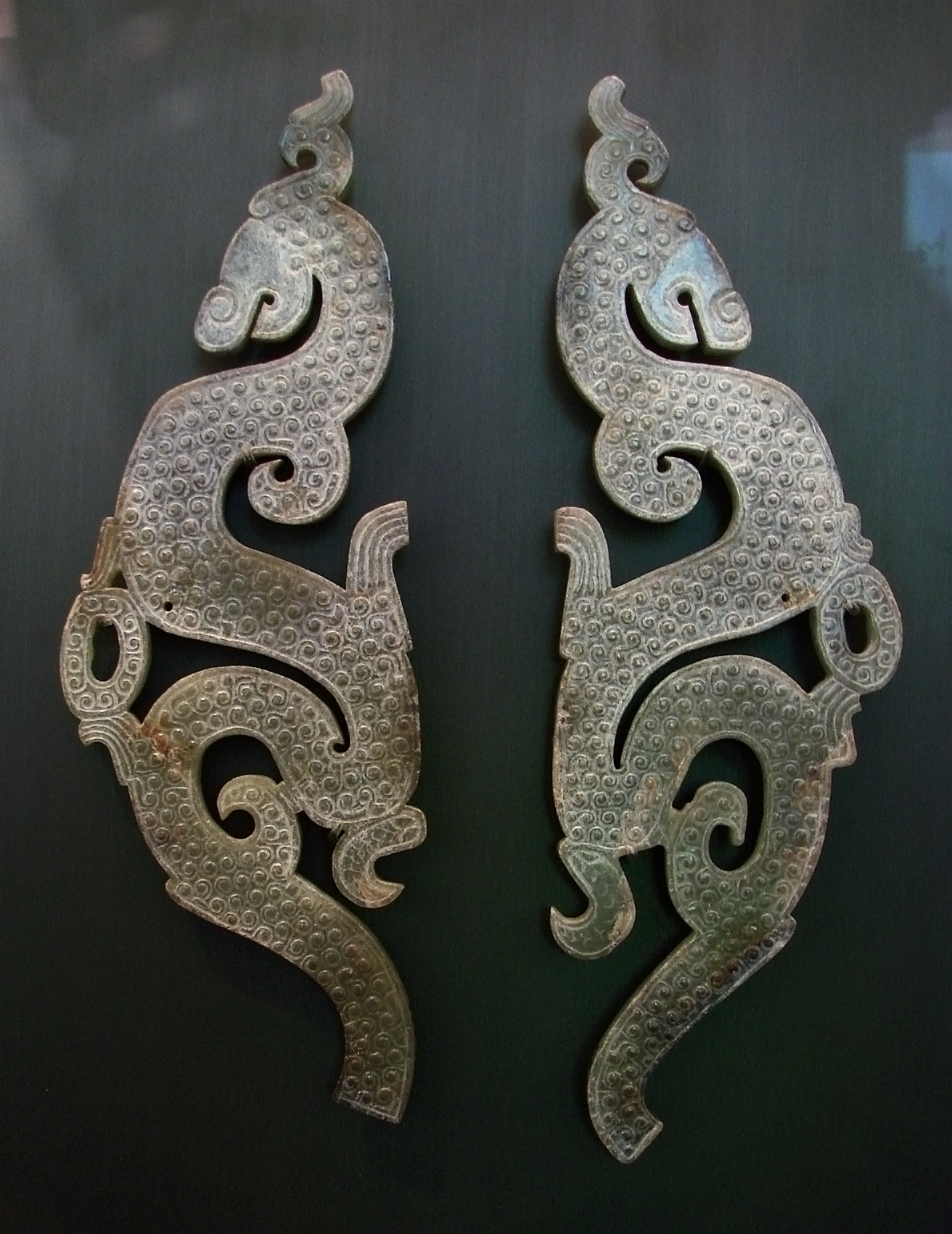
Jade-carved pendents in the shape of Chinese dragons, 2nd century BC, Western Han Era

During Western Han, the Chancellor was the chief civil official. The duties of the chancellery were divided between a Right Chancellor (右丞相) and Left Chancellor (左丞相) between 196 and 180 BC. After 180 BC, the Left Chancellor's post was merely titular and its incumbent had no real authority. The Western Han Chancellor oversaw state finances, logistics for military campaigns, registers for land and population, maps of the empire's territories, annual provincial reports, high-profile lawsuits, and drafted the government budget. The Chancellor could directly appoint officials who were ranked 600-dan or below, while he was also able to recommend nominees to the emperor for recruitment to the senior roles in central government. The Chancellor was held responsible for the actions of officials he recommended and appointed, yet he could also punish inadequate officials without the emperor's consent.

Whenever the emperor was absent from a court conference but sought its advice, he relied on the chancellor to direct it and inform him of the resulting majority opinion. If the attending ministers were split into opposing factions of roughly equal size, the chancellor would listen to the positions of both sides and count the exact number of ministers who supported either opposing opinion.

The Palace Writers (Zhongshu 中書) were originally palace eunuch secretaries (Zhongshu guan 中書官) from Emperor Wu's reign until 29 BC, when they were staffed by regular officials. They usurped much of the Chancellor's powers by the end of Western Han. The position of Chancellor was abolished for much of Eastern Han and replaced by the Excellency over the Masses. However, in 208 AD the Excellency of Works Cao Cao (155–220 AD) assumed the revived post of Chancellor while acting as the de facto ruler over the court of Emperor Xian (r. 189–220 AD). Cao Cao also abolished the Grand Commandant and Excellency of Works while reinstating the Imperial Counselor.

==== Imperial Counselor ====
During Western Han the Imperial Counselor, also known as the Grandee Secretary and Imperial Secretary, was considered the second-ranking official below the Chancellor. Like the Chancellor, he exercised censorial powers over provincial officials who also sent him annual reports. His primary duty was to uphold disciplinary procedures for officials; he could investigate even those attached to the chancellery and the imperial palace. Since one of his main functions was to prevent abuse of authority, his jurisdiction over officialdom tended to overlap with that of the Chancellor's. His subordinates included the Imperial Clerks (Shiyushi 侍御史; also known as Attending Secretaries), led by the Palace Assistant Imperial Clerk (Yushi zhongcheng 御史中丞; also known as the Palace Assistant Secretary). They were often sent out into the provinces to investigate possible wrongdoing on the part of local officials.

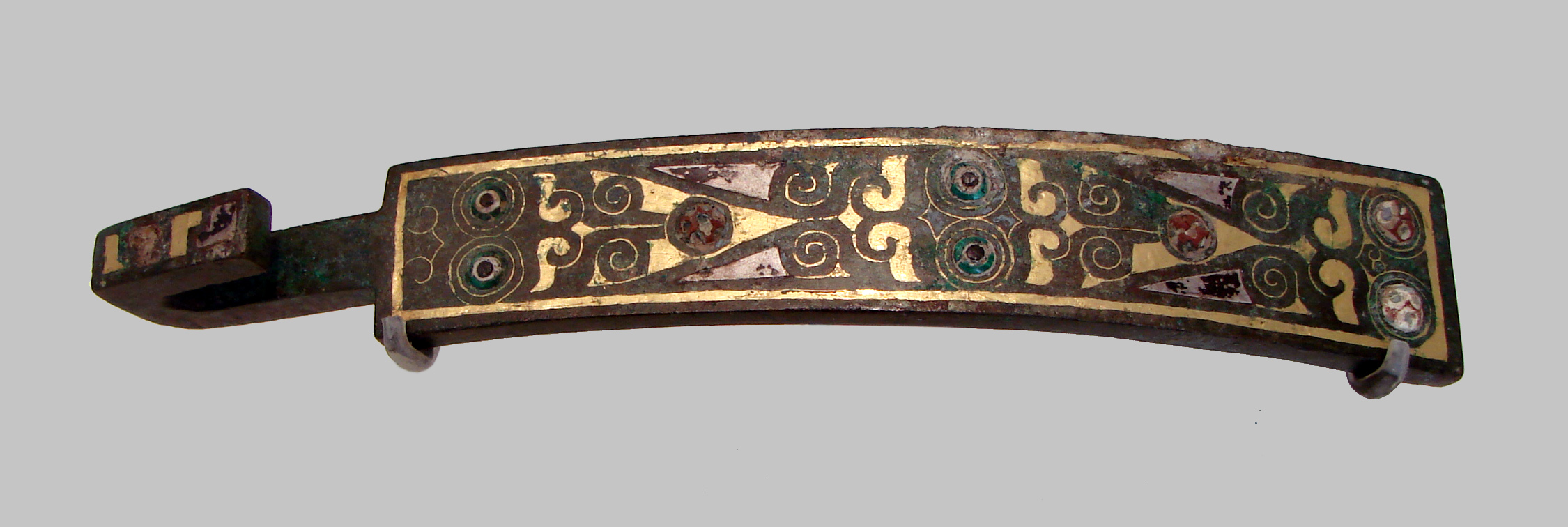
A belt hook inlaid with gold and silver, from either the late Warring States period (403–221 BC) or early Western Han dynasty

The Imperial Counselor transmitted and received imperial edicts to and from the chancellery and also presented officials' memorials to the throne. During Western Han, the Palace Assistant Imperial Clerk's office was located within the walls of the palace. He had the authority to investigate attendants and eunuchs of the palace and to reject improperly written memorials before submission to the Imperial Counselor. The Masters of Writing under the Minister Steward then processed these memorials before they were sent to the throne. The Palace Assistant Imperial Clerk's proximity to the emperor during Eastern Han allowed him to surpass the authority of his nominal superior, the Excellency of Works, yet his Western-Han-era power to inspect local provincial authorities was removed. The Minister Steward—who was supervised by the Imperial Counselor (and later Excellency of Works)—became the Palace Assistant Imperial Clerk's new superior by early Eastern Han. The Palace Assistant Imperial Clerk also managed the Imperial Library in both Western and Eastern Han, this duty being transferred to a subordinate of the Minister of Ceremonies in 159 AD.

==== Grand Commandant ====
The Grand Commandant (also known as the Commander-in-Chief) was the head commander of the military in Western Han, yet his office was irregularly filled (from 205–202 BC, from 196–195 BC, from 189–177 BC, from 154–150 BC, and in 140 BC). After 119 BC, the generals Huo Qubing (d. 117 BC) and Wei Qing (d. 106 BC) simultaneously held the title until their deaths, but when the post was revived in 87 BC it became politicized when conferred as a regent's title for Huo Guang (d. 68 BC). The regent was thus considered one of the Three Excellencies, although he was not technically part of the cabinet.

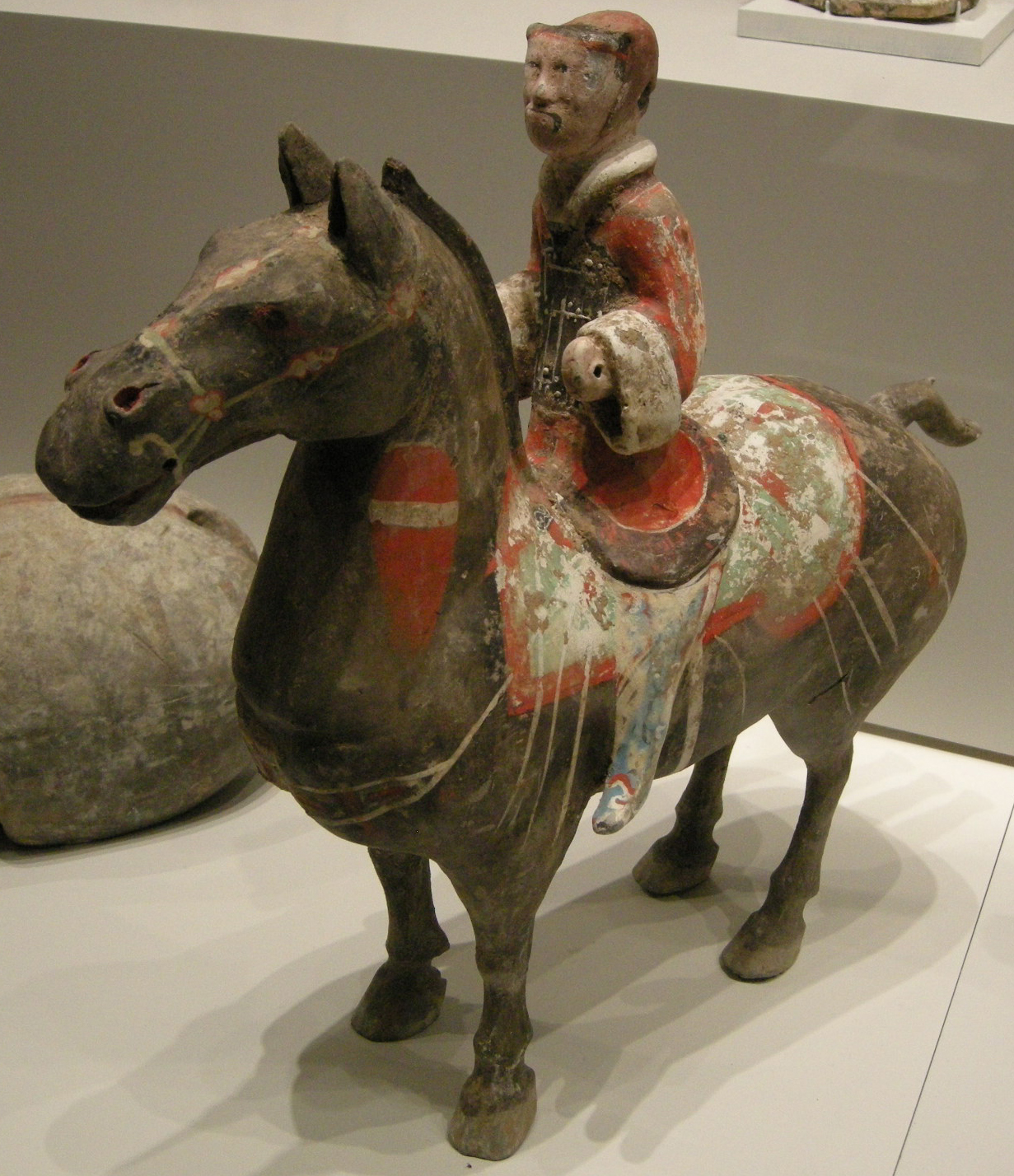
A Han painted pottery mounted cavalryman in armor and uniform

The Grand Commandant's office witnessed significant changes during Eastern Han. Wang Mang separated the regent's role from the Grand Commandant's post during the Xin dynasty (9–23 AD), since he did not want an active regent for his regime. This was retained by Eastern Han, while the third Grand Commandant of Eastern Han appointed in 51 AD transformed his ministry into a primarily civilian one. Although the Eastern-Han Grand Commandant shared the same salary-rank as the other two Excellencies who were nominally considered his equals, he was nonetheless given de facto privilege as the most senior civil official. However, his censorial jurisdiction now overlapped with the other two Excellencies (i.e. he was able to investigate the same officials in central and local government), who shared an advisory role to the emperor (policy suggestions could be submitted independently or jointly by all three cabinet members). His various bureaus handled appointment, promotion, and demotion of officials, population registers and agriculture, the upkeep of transportation facilities, post offices, and couriers, civil law cases, granary storage, and military affairs. He was also given formal powers to supervise three of the Nine Ministers: the Minister of Ceremonies, Minister of the Household, and Minister of the Guards.

==== Excellency over the Masses ====
The Excellency over the Masses (also known as the Minister over the Masses) shared the same censorial and advisory roles as the other two Excellencies, the Excellency of Works and Grand Commandant. Like his previous counterpart, the Chancellor, he must have been responsible for drawing up the annual budget, although contemporary sources fail to mention this point. Aside from the court conference, the Great Conference of leading officials across the empire was conducted by his ministry. The Chancellor's bureaus were also retained by the Excellency over the Masses, and were nearly identical to that of the new Eastern-Han Grand Commandant's bureaus. He was given formal powers to supervise three of the Nine Ministers: the Minister Coachman, Minister of Justice, and Minister Herald.

==== Excellency of Works ====
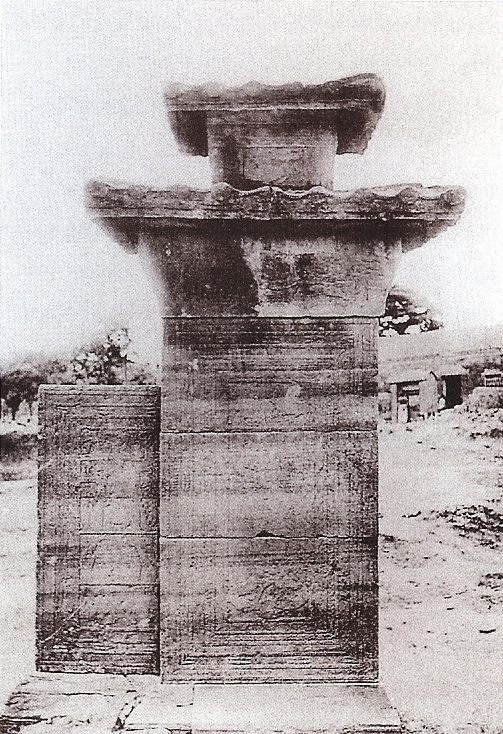
Early 20th-century photo of a 2nd-century-AD stone "pillar-gate" (que 闕) from the site of the 'Wu family shrine' in Shandong, Eastern Han period; the Minister of Works oversaw construction projects in the empire, yet the Court Architect continued to oversee imperial construction projects.

The Excellency of Works, also known as the Minister of Works, was less powerful than his previous counterpart, the Imperial Counselor. This official's advisory and censorial responsibilities coincided with those of two other Excellencies, forming a tripartite cabinet arrangement. Unlike the abolished Imperial Counselor, he was given the specialized role of overseeing public works projects throughout the empire. The Excellency of Works was responsible for the construction of city walls, towns, canals, irrigation ditches, dykes and dams, and other structural engineering projects. The Court Architect supervised only imperial building projects. The Excellency of Works made annual reports to the throne about the progress of local administrations' conduct of construction projects. He was given formal powers to supervise three of the Nine Ministers: the Minister of the Imperial Clan, Minister of Finance, and Minister Steward.

=== Nine Ministers ===
The Nine Ministers, who were supervised by the Three Excellencies but not direct subordinates of the cabinet, each headed a specialized government ministry and held a salary-rank of Fully 2,000-dan. Along with the tripartite cabinet members, these ministers usually attended court conferences.

==== Minister of Ceremonies ====
The Minister of Ceremonies (Taichang 太常), also known as Grand Master of Ceremonies, was the chief official in charge of religious rites, rituals, prayers, and the maintenance of ancestral temples and altars. The role's title was changed to Upholder of Ceremonies (Fengchang 奉常) from 195 to 144 BC before reverting to the original title. Although his main concern was to link the emperor with the supernatural world and Heaven, he was also given the task of setting educational standards for the Imperial University (est. 124 BC) and the academic chairs (boshi 博士) who specialized in the Five Classics, the canon of Confucianism.

One of the many subordinates of the Minister of Ceremonies was the Court Astronomer (Taishi ling 太史令; also known as the Prefect Grand Astrologer), who made astronomical observations and drafted the annual lunisolar calendar. The Court Astronomer also upheld a literacy test of 9,000 characters for nominees aspiring to become subordinate officials for either the Minister Steward or Palace Assistant Imperial Clerk. These nominees were often recommended subordinates of commandery-level Administrators. Other subordinates of the Minister of Ceremonies reported illegal acts at ancestral temples, prepared sacrificial offerings of food and wine at shrines and temples, and arranged for the music and dancing that accompanied ceremonies.

==== Minister of the Household ====
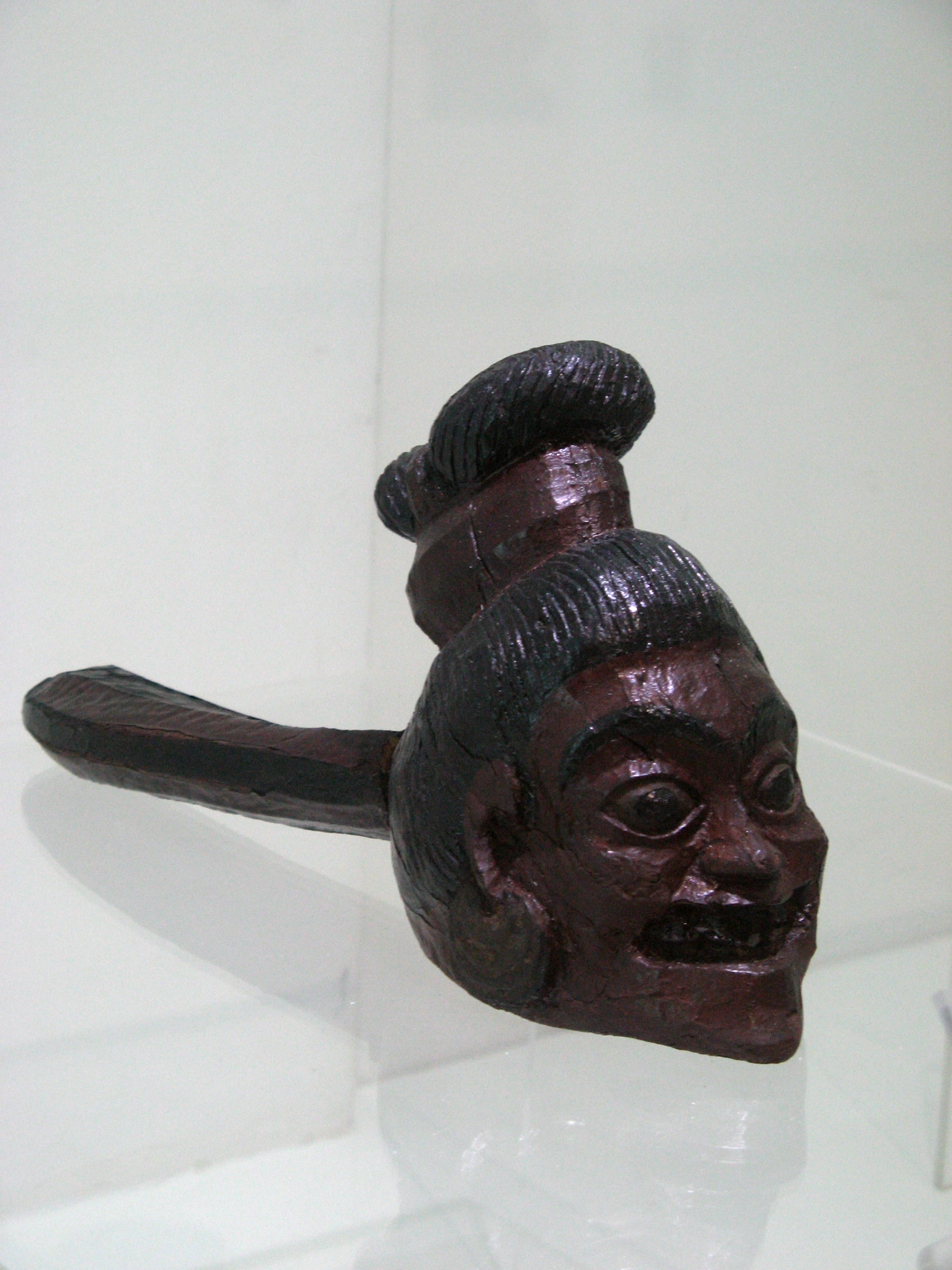
Lacquerware in the shape of a man's head, Western Han (202 BC - 9 AD), Yunnan Provincial Museum, Kunming; luxury items such as lacquerwares were commonly used by the rich, nobility, and imperial court and often buried in Han tombs

The Minister of the Household (Guangluxun 光祿勳), also known as Superintendent of the Household and Supervisor of Attendants, was originally titled the Prefect of the Gentlemen of the Palace (Langzhongling 郎中令) before 104 BC. He was responsible for the emperor's security within the palace grounds, external imperial parks, and wherever the emperor made an outing by chariot. However, to ensure that the emperor's entire safety was not entrusted to a single officer, the subordinates of the Minister of the Guards were given sole right to patrol the palaces' entrances and walls while the eunuchs guarded the emperor's private apartments and harem. Three of the five cadet corps commanded by the Minister of the Household were actually armed civilian nominees serving a period of probation before appointment to a government office; the other two corps were composed of imperial bodyguards who were never appointed to civilian offices. The former were often recommended by commandery-level Administrators as Filial and Incorrupt, while others could be relatives of high officials in central government. The Minister of the Household oversaw subordinate court advisors (Yi Lang 議郎/议郎) who advised the emperor and engaged in scholarly debates. They were allowed to openly criticize the emperor, participate in provincial inspections, and conduct mourning ceremonies for recently deceased kings and marquesses while installing their successors. Internuncios (Yezhe 謁者), led by a Supervisor of the Internuncios (Yezhe puye 謁者僕射), were subordinates of the Minister of the Household who participated in state ceremonies, condoled on behalf of the emperor for recently deceased officials, inspected public works and military camps along the frontiers, and acted as diplomats to the semi-autonomous fiefs and non-Han-Chinese peoples along the borders.

==== Minister of the Guards ====
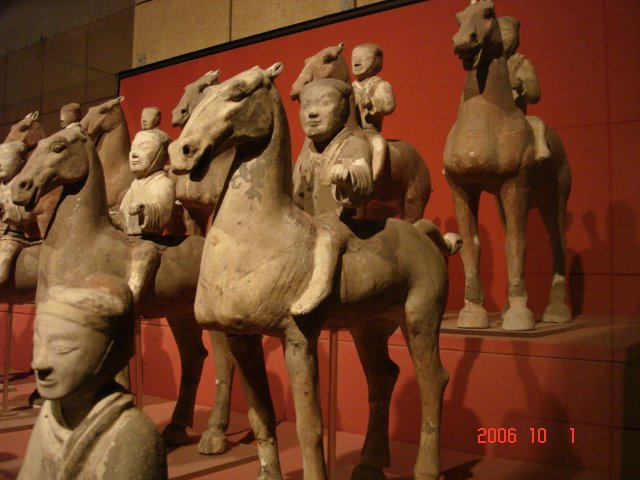
Western-Han ceramic tomb figurines of cavalrymen on horseback

The Minister of the Guards was called the Commandant of the Guards (Weiwei 衛尉) and also briefly as the Prefect of the Palace Grandees (Zhong Dafu Ling 中大夫令) during Emperor Jing of Han's reign (r. 157–141 BC) before reverting to the original title. This minister was responsible for securing and patrolling the walls, towers, and gates of the imperial palaces. The duties of his ministry were carried out by prefects, one of whom controlled the gates where nominees for office were received and officials sent memorials to the throne. To control and monitor the flow of traffic through the palace gates, the prefects used a complex passport system involving wooden and metal tallies. During an emergency, the tallies were collected and no-one was allowed to enter unless they breached the gates by force. The guards were conscripted peasants who served for a year's term as soldiers and were invited to attend a celebratory feast hosted by the emperor before demobilization.

==== Minister Coachman ====
The Minister Coachman was called the Grand Coachman (Taipu 太僕) and was responsible for the maintenance of imperial stables, horses, carriages and coachhouses for the emperor and his palace attendants, and for the supply of horses for the armed forces. His latter duty entailed the supervising of large breeding grounds of frontier pastures, tended by tens of thousands of government slaves. By the reign of Emperor Wu of Han (r. 141–87 BC) these contained 300,000 warhorses intended for use in campaigns against the nomadic Xiongnu Confederation. Some of the Minister Coachman's subordinates managed stables outside the capital city. These stables housed Ferghana horses that were imported or gathered as tribute from Central Asian countries.

In Eastern Han—possibly due to the Coachman's influence over the transport of arms—a prefect in charge of manufacturing bows, crossbows, swords, and armor for the military was transferred from the Minister Steward's ministry to that of the Minister Coachman.

==== Minister of Justice ====
The Minister of Justice, literally the Commandant of Justice (Tingwei 廷尉), was known as the Grand Judge (Dali 大理) between 144 and 137 BC and again between 1 BC and c. AD 25. He was the chief official in charge of upholding, administering, and interpreting the law. Only the emperor, in his role as judge, was superior to this minister. The Minister of Justice was the supreme civil-appointed judge for cases deferred to the capital from provincial lawsuits. His judicial powers, however, were similar to those of the Chancellor. He could recommend changes to the law code and the granting of general amnesties to those charged with crimes. His ministry was responsible for maintaining the Imperial Prison, where trials were conducted, and carrying out executions. It is unknown whether he oversaw all of the twenty-six prisons in Western Han Chang'an, which were built to house convicted ex-officials. However, during Eastern Han, the Imperial Prison in Luoyang was the only prison managed by the Minister of Justice.

==== Minister Herald ====
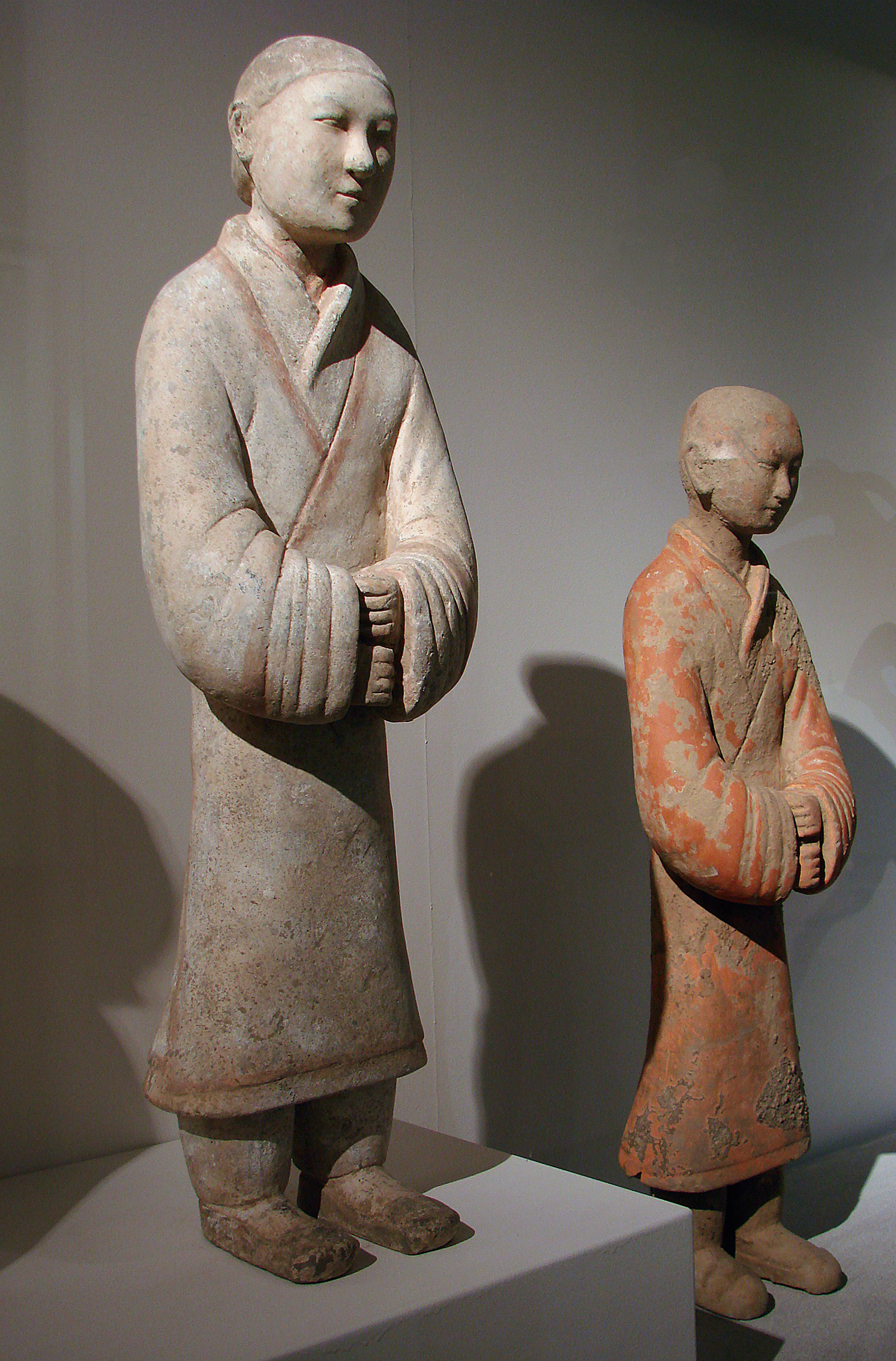
Western-Han painted ceramic figurines (with polychrome) of servants in attendance, from Shaanxi, 2nd century BC

The Minister Herald was called the Grand Herald (Dahonglu 大鴻臚); he was also called the Director of Guests (Dianke 典客) between 202 and 144 BC and Prefect Grand Usher (Daxingling 大行令) between 144 and 104 BC. He was the chief official in charge of receiving honored guests, such as nobles and foreign ambassadors, at the imperial court. Alongside the Minister of the Imperial Clan, his ministry oversaw the inheritance of titles and fiefs by condoling on behalf of the emperor at kings' funerals and memorializing the posthumous names of kings and marquesses. The Minister Herald's office received the annual reports from the commanderies and kingdoms when they arrived in the capital at the beginning of the year, before passing them on to the Excellencies. His subordinates acted as seating guides and ushers for officials, nobles, and foreign delegates at imperial ceremonies and sacrifices. One of his subordinates maintained living quarters for officials in the commanderies and kingdoms who were traveling to the capital. While the Minister Herald had always conducted the formal reception of foreign envoys and enlisted the aid of interpreters, his powers in matters of foreign affairs were expanded further when the post of Director of Dependent States was abolished in 28 BC. However, by Eastern Han his duties involving the affairs of Dependent States were transferred to local administrations along the borders.

==== Minister of the Imperial Clan ====
While eight of the Nine Ministers could be of commoner origin, the post of Minister of the Imperial Clan (Zongzheng 宗正), also known as the Director of the Imperial Clan, was always occupied by a member of the imperial family. He oversaw the imperial court's interactions with the empire's nobility and extended imperial family, such as granting fiefs and titles. His ministry was responsible for record-keeping of all nobles, a register being updated at the beginning of each year. When a serious infraction was committed by a member of the imperial family, the Minister of the Imperial Clan was the first high official to be notified before the emperor, who made the ultimate decision about any possible legal action. This minister's subordinates heard grievances of imperial family members and informed them about new ordinances. Unlike kings and marquesses, who were not responsible to any of the Nine Ministers, imperial princesses and their fiefs were kept under surveillance by the Minister of the Imperial Clan.

==== Minister of Finance ====
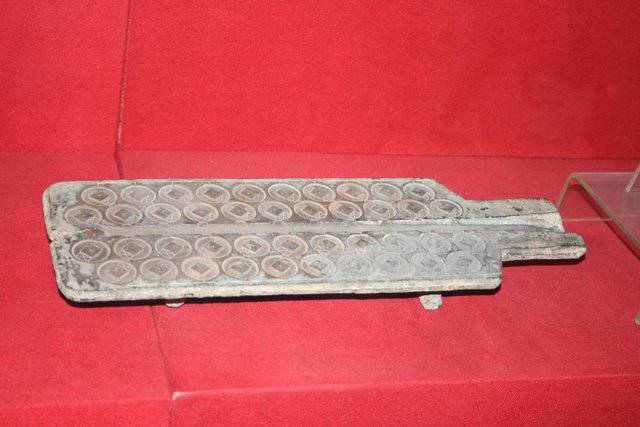
A Han bronze mold for making wushu (五銖) coins; after 115 BC, the management of the imperial mint was the duty of the Superintendent of Waterways and Parks, yet this role was transferred to the Minister of Finance by the Eastern Han period (25–220 AD).

The Minister of Finance was called the Grand Minister of Agriculture (Da sinong 大司農), and before 144 BC, was known as Clerk of the Capital for Grain (Zhisu neishi 治粟內史). This minister was the central government's treasurer for the official bureaucracy and the armed forces. While the Chancellor drafted the state budget, the Minister of Finance was responsible for funding it. He was in charge of storing the poll taxes, which were gathered in coin cash, and land tax, which was gathered as a proportion of farmers' annual crop yields. He was also responsible for setting the standards for units of measurement. In addition to reviewing tax collections, he could implement policies for price control exacted on certain commercial commodities.

During Western Han, the Minister of Finance's powers were limited to the public treasury, the Minister Steward being responsible for the emperor's private wealth. However, in Eastern Han, the responsibilities for the public treasury and the emperor's private wealth were amalgamated and entrusted solely to the Minister of Finance, which later proved disastrous when handled by irresponsible emperors such as Ling (r. 168–189 AD). During Western Han, the Minister of Finance managed the government's monopolized salt and iron agencies, which were abolished during Eastern Han and transferred to local administrations and private entrepreneurship. He also managed the government's brief monopoly over liquor from 98–81 BC, before it was returned to private production. Although the Minister Steward and then the Superintendent of Waterways and Parks managed the imperial mint for issuing standard coins during Western Han, in Eastern Han the imperial mint was transferred to the office of the Minister of Finance.

==== Minister Steward ====
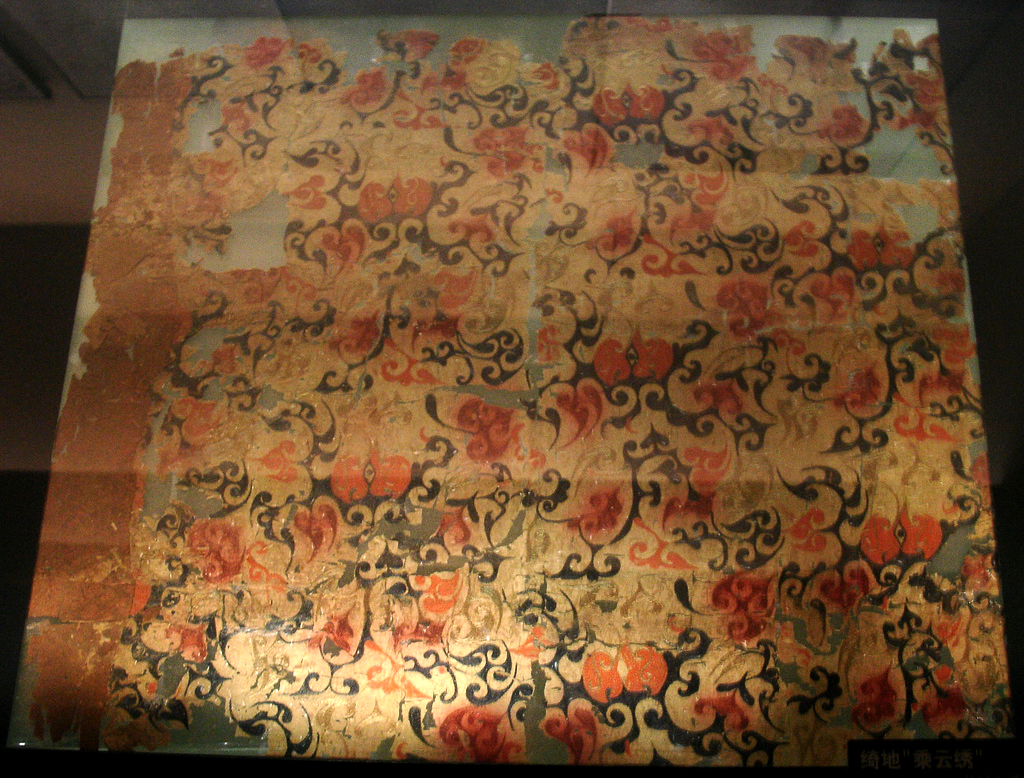
Silk textile from tomb no. 1 at Mawangdui, 2nd century BC, Western Han; the Minister Steward's ministry managed the workshops producing silk clothes, embroideries, and curtains for the emperor, his royal family, and palatial residences.

The Minister Steward (Shaofu 少府), also known as the Privy Treasurer and Small Treasurer, served the emperor exclusively, providing him with entertainment and amusements, proper food and clothing, medicine and physical care, valuables and equipment. For this purpose he was given responsibility for the emperor's personal finances during Western Han, yet this responsibility was transferred to the Minister of Finance during Eastern Han. Although he was not a castrated eunuch, many of his subordinates were, since his ministry managed the imperial harem housing concubines. His secretaries were headed by a Prefect of the Masters of Writing (Shangshu ling 尚書令). The secretaries were responsible for relaying all written messages to the emperor, official correspondence with Excellencies, senior ministers, provincial authorities, common people who submitted memorials to the throne, and non-Han-Chinese peoples within and outside the empire. Since the Masters of Writing were not eunuchs, and thus not allowed into the imperial harem, Emperor Wu established an all-eunuch office of secretaries for the inner palace, which was abolished in 29 BC.

The Minister Steward had many subordinates, including the Court Physician (Taiyi ling 太醫令), also known as the Prefect Grand Physician, who checked the emperor's health every morning and accompanied him on imperial hunting trips. The Court Provisioner (Taiguan ling 太官令), also known as the Prefect Grand Provisioner, was responsible for managing the kitchen, its cooks, and supplying food for the emperor. Other subordinates managed the weaving houses which supplied the clothes for the emperor, the workshops which produced wares, utensils, and funerary items for the emperor, and the imperial parks and gardens where the emperor could hunt and attend outings. The Bureau of Music (Yuefu 樂府) was overseen by the Minister Steward and was in charge of musical performances at imperial ceremonies and entertaining the emperor with folk songs gathered from throughout the empire; it was disbanded in 7 BC and its musicians transferred to the Minister of Ceremonies.

=== Staffs of the heir apparent, empress, and harems ===
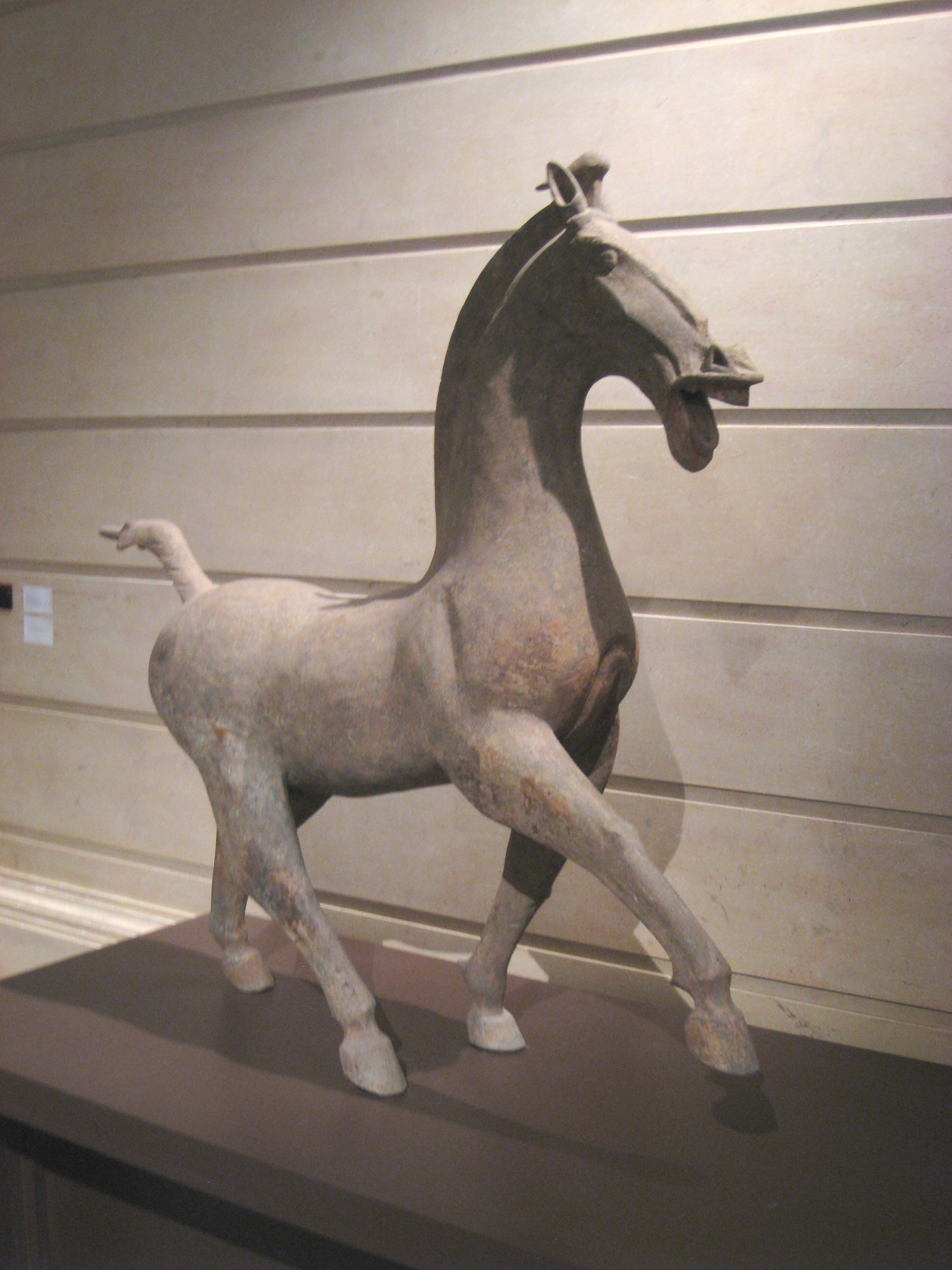
A Han-dynasty terracotta statue of a prancing horse

When a Liu-family relative of an emperor—usually a princely son—was designated as his heir apparent, he was provided living quarters within the palace and a personal staff which was not disbanded until he became the next emperor. During Western Han, the staff had two divisions: one was led by educators of the heir apparent, known as the Grand Tutor of the Heir Apparent and Junior Tutor of the Heir Apparent, the other led by a Supervisor of the Household (all ranked 2,000-dan). During Eastern Han, the Grand Tutor of the Heir Apparent lost his administrative role but remained the chief educator and was promoted in rank to Fully 2,000-dan; the Junior Tutor remained an administrator with a salary-rank of 2,000-dan. The post of Supervisor of the Household was abolished. Other Western Han staff offices of the heir apparent were abolished during Eastern Han, such as the Chief of the Kitchen and the Household Prison of the Heir Apparent. If he reached adulthood, the heir apparent could be married to a principal wife who led a harem of his concubines.

The empress, the legal wife of the emperor, also had an area of the palace separate from that of the emperor's private apartments, where the empress was expected to spend every fifth night with the emperor. Both the empress and the heir apparent received an income from the taxes of forty counties. She also had a Supervisor of the Household (ranked 2,000-dan), and many other subordinates, either male eunuchs or female maids, who took care of domestic needs. The concubines of the harem were subordinates of the empress and were ranked below her in fourteen grades by the reign of Emperor Yuan of Han (r. 49–33 BC). However, the founder of Eastern Han abolished the fourteen salary-ranks in favor of three ranks with no definite salary; instead, the concubines were irregularly granted gifts. The chief concubine of Western Han, the Brilliant Companion, shared the same salary-rank as the Chancellor, while the concubine ranked just below her, the Favorite Beauty, shared the same salary-rank as any one of the Nine Ministers.

=== Metropolitan offices ===
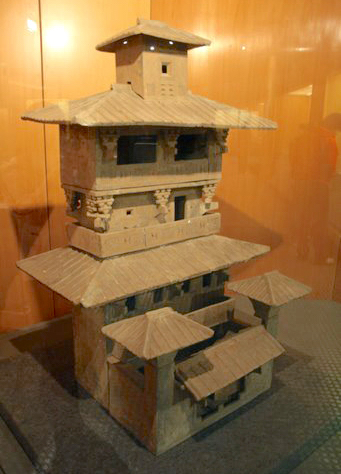
A Han ceramic tomb model of a multiple-story residential tower with a first-floor gatehouse and courtyard, mid-floor balcony, windows, and clearly distinguished dougong support brackets

The metropolitan areas of both Western Han Chang'an and Eastern Han Luoyang were governed and secured by several officials and officers. The county and municipal divisions of the capital cities were governed by a Prefect (Ling 令). The Prefect was also responsible for a prison and could arrest officials of high rank. The Colonel of the City Gates (Chengmen xiaowei 城門校衛) commanded the garrisons at the twelve city gates, each guarded by a captain, in both Western Han Chang'an and Eastern Han Luoyang.

==== Bearer of the Mace ====
The Bearer of the Mace (Zhi jinwu 執金吾), also known as the Bearer of the Gilded Mace and Commandant of the Capital (Zhongwei 中尉) before 104 BC, maintained law and order in the capital city —excluding the imperial palaces. During Western Han, his salary-rank was fully 2,000-dan; thus his prestige was similar to that of the Nine Ministers. However, during Eastern Han his salary-rank was reduced from fully 2,000-dan to equivalent to 2,000-dan.

While his subordinates were on constant patrol, the Bearer of the Mace personally inspected the city three times each month. He was responsible for the military arsenal as well as disaster relief efforts during floods and fires. The Bearer of the Mace had a large staff of subordinates during Western Han, whose posts were abolished or transferred elsewhere during Eastern Han. This included the abolition of the Captains of the Standard Bearers, and the emperor's entourage became responsible for clearing the roadways when the emperor left the palace and hoisting colored standards to signal his return.

==== Court Architect ====
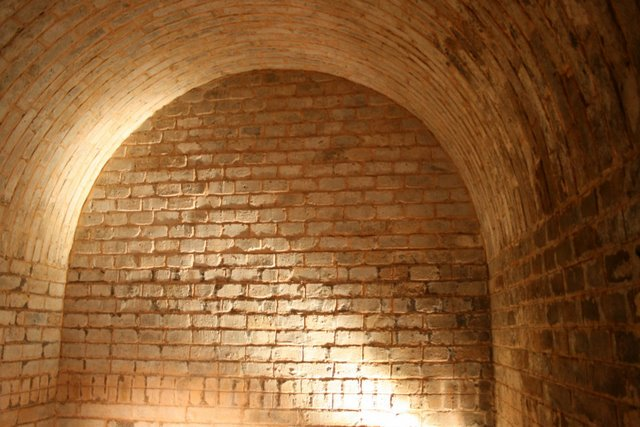
An Eastern Han vaulted tomb chamber at Luoyang made of brick

The Court Architect (Jiangzuo dajiang 將作大匠) was in charge of the construction, maintenance, and repair of imperial palace halls, government halls, temples, grave tumuli, buildings in funerary parks, roads leading out of the capital, and flood control works. His salary-rank was 2,000-dan. He directed the efforts of conscripted corvée laborers until this duty was transferred to the ministry of the newly created Excellency of Works in 8 BC. The Court Architect's subordinates were responsible for gathering timber for carpenters and stone for masons. Although his office existed at the establishment of Eastern Han, it was abolished in 57 AD and his duties were transferred to an Internuncio in the Ministry of the Household. However, the post was reinstated in 76 AD with the original salary-rank, yet many of his subordinates remained abolished. Since most buildings were constructed from wood, with ceramic roof tiles, a large workforce was needed to maintain buildings that fell into disrepair. The restoration of the Imperial University during Emperor Shun's (r. 125–144 AD) reign required 100,000 laborers to work for a year under the supervision of the Court Architect.

==== Colonel Director of Retainers ====
The Colonel Director of Retainers (Sili xiaowei 司隸校尉), also known as Colonel of Censure and Colonel Director of Convict-Laborers, was originally called the Director of Retainers (Sili 司隸). His task was to supervise 1,200 convicts in their construction of roads and canals. In 91 BC, an unsuccessful five-day rebellion in Chang'an was instigated by Crown Prince Liu Ju (d. 91 BC) and his mother Empress Wei Zifu (d. 91 BC), who had been accused of witchcraft and black magic. For this event, Emperor Wu prefixed "colonel" to the title of the Director of Retainers in 89 BC, promoting him to the salary-rank 2,000-dan, and granted him the Staff of Authority, allowing him to arrest and punish those allegedly practicing witchcraft.

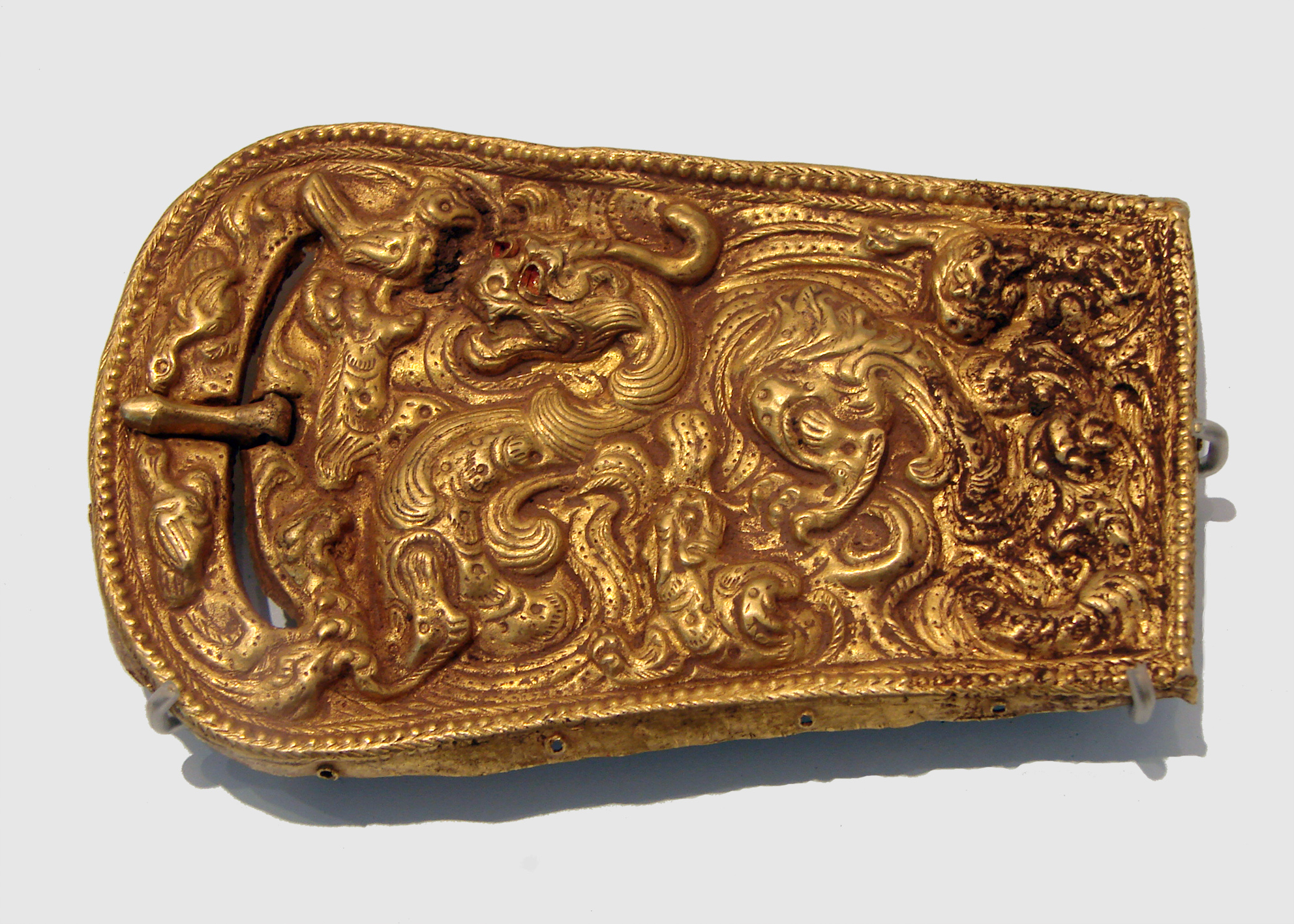
A golden belt hook, hammered and chiseled with designs of mythical animals and birds, from the Eastern Han Era

Following the crisis, the Colonel Director of Retainers retained his privileged possession of the Staff of Authority and was granted the same investigative and censorial powers as the Chancellor and Imperial Counselor over officialdom. He routinely inspected the conduct of officials in the capital region and seven nearby commanderies. His investigative powers matched those of a provincial Inspector, although his Staff of Authority made him more powerful than the latter. The Colonel Director of Retainers was a personal servant of the emperor, answering only to him, allowing the emperor to greatly enhance his control over the bureaucracy. However, the Staff of Authority was removed from the Colonel in 45 BC, limiting his powers to inspection, investigation, and impeachment and he was distinguished from a provincial Inspector only by a higher salary-rank. The office of Colonel Director of Retainers was abolished in 9 BC, and reinstated once more as the Director of Retainers in 7 BC. He was now a subordinate of the new Excellency of Works and supervised convicts in public works projects, like his early Western Han counterpart. In Eastern Han, the Colonel Director of Retainers was reappointed without the Staff of Authority, with powers to inspect the capital region, but his salary-rank was reduced from 2,000–dan to Equivalent to 2,000–dan.

==== Superintendent of Waterways and Parks ====
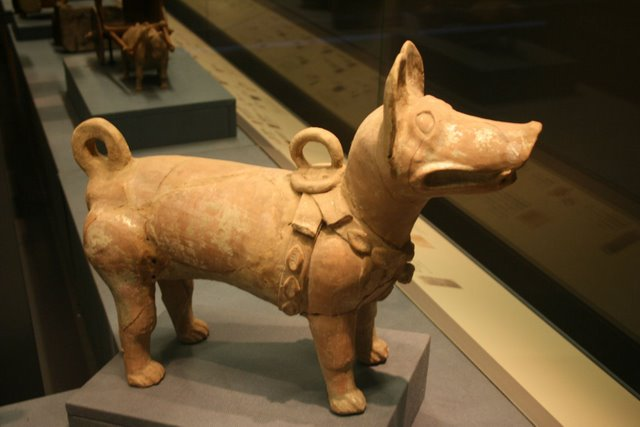
A Western-Han pottery dog with a harness for a leash; a subordinate of the Superintendent of Waterways and Parks cared for hunting dogs who assisted in the imperial hunts for game meat.

The Superintendent of Waterways and Parks (Shuiheng duwei 水衡都尉) was also known as the Chief Commandant of Waterways and Parks, and was once a subordinate of the Minister Steward until 115 BC, when he, and other former subordinates of that ministry, became independent officers. His salary-rank was equivalent to 2,000–dan. The Superintendent of Waterways and Parks managed a large imperial hunting park located outside Chang'an, including its palaces, rest stops, granaries, and cultivated patches of fruit and vegetable gardens, which, along with game meat, provided food for the emperor's household. He also collected taxes from commoners using the park's grounds and transmitted these funds to the Minister Steward, who managed the emperor's finances. One of the Superintendent's subordinates supervised convicted criminals in their care of the park's hunting dogs.

In 115 BC the central government's mint was transferred from the Minister Steward's ministry to the park managed by the Superintendent of Waterways and Parks. In 113 BC the central government closed all commandery-level mints; private minting had previously been outlawed in 144 BC. The Superintendent's imperial mint in the park outside Chang'an had the sole right to issue coinage throughout the empire. However, Emperor Guangwu of Han (r. 25–57 AD) abolished the Superintendent of Waterways and Parks and revived his post annually during autumn to conduct a ritual sacrifice. The imperial mint became the responsibility of the Minister of Finance and the imperial park located outside Eastern-Han Luoyang was administered by a prefect.

==== Director of Dependent States ====
The Ordos Desert, located below the wide northern bend of the Yellow River in Inner Mongolia

The Director of Dependent States (Dian shuguo 典屬國), whose salary-rank was 2,000-dan, was responsible for embassies to foreign countries and nomadic peoples along Han's borders and the annual exchange of hostages—usually foreign princes—submitted to the Han court. Dependent States (Shuguo 屬國) were first established in 121 BC and composed mostly non-Han-Chinese nomadic tribes and confederations who surrendered after negotiation or armed conflict and accepted Han suzerainty. They served as a buffer between Han territory and hostile tribes, such as the Xiongnu, and as a means to quell tribes in the Ordos Desert. The Han court appointed a Commandant (Duwei 都尉), also known as Chief Commandant, ranked Equivalent to 2,000-dan, to govern the non-Han-Chinese populations of each Dependent State. The title of the Director of Dependent States was abolished in 28 BC; his duties and his subordinates, the Commandants, became the responsibilities of the Minister Herald. The Protectorate of the Western Regions, established in 60 BC, which conducted foreign affairs with the oasis city-states in the Tarim Basin of Central Asia, was not the responsibility of the Director of Dependent States.

== Local government ==
The Han Empire was divided by hierarchical political divisions in the following descending order: provinces (zhou), commanderies (jun), and counties (xian). This model of local government was adopted from the previous government structure of the Qin dynasty.

=== Provincial authorities ===
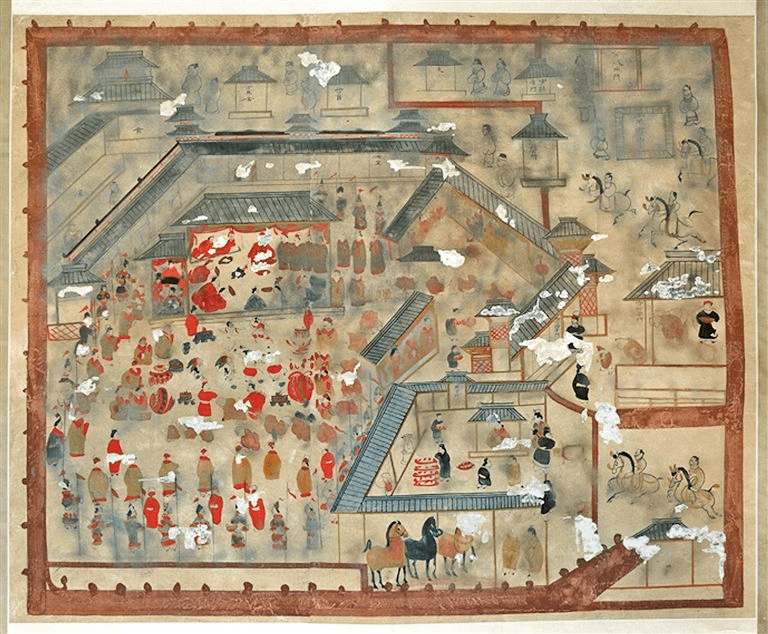
An Eastern Han (25–220) period Chinese mural of a mufu conference conducted by the Commandant-protector of the Wuhuan (护乌桓校尉) at his manor, from a Han tomb in Horinger, Inner Mongolia

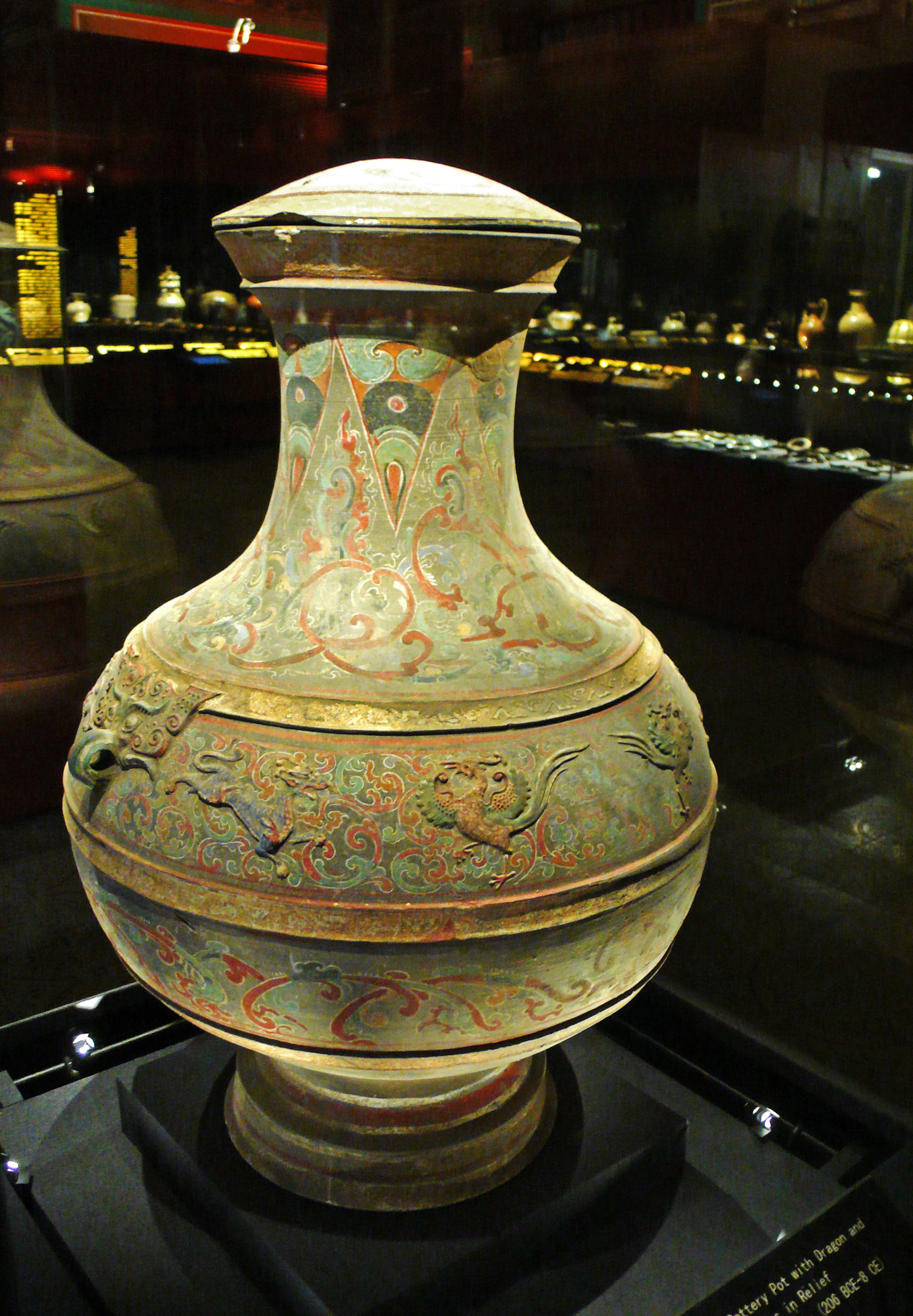
Western Han painted ceramic jar with raised reliefs of dragons, phoenixes, and taotie designs

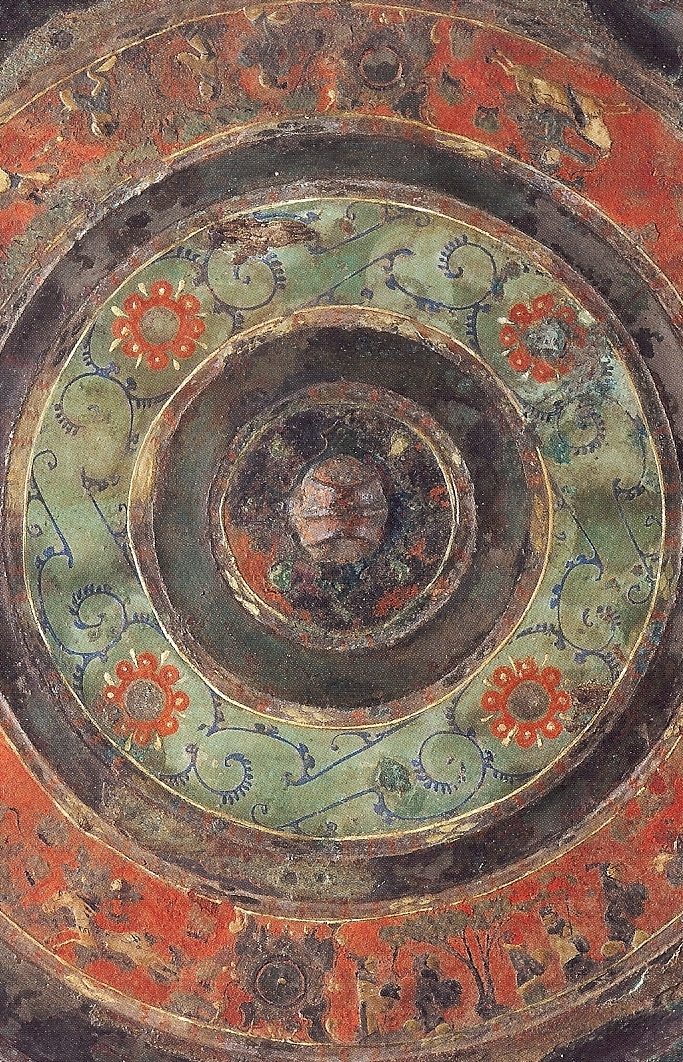
Reverse side of a Western Han bronze mirror with a painted flower motif

A Han province consisted of a group of commanderies, the administrations of which were subject to scrutiny and inspection by centrally appointed officials. These were the Inspectors (Cishi 刺史), also known as the Circuit Inspector, who were first appointed in 106 BC at a salary-rank of 600-dan. In Western Han they were supervised by the Palace Assistant Imperial Clerk and were subordinates of the Imperial Counselor. Aside from the province-sized capital region, known as Sili Province, which was entrusted to the Colonel Director of Retainers from 89–9 BC, there were thirteen provinces during Western Han. Eventually, the title of Inspector was changed to Governor (Mu 牧; literally "Shepherd"), a post with a considerably higher salary-rank of 2,000-dan. From 5–1 BC, this post was reverted to Inspector, but was once again re-titled Governor, who was now responsible to all Three Excellencies.

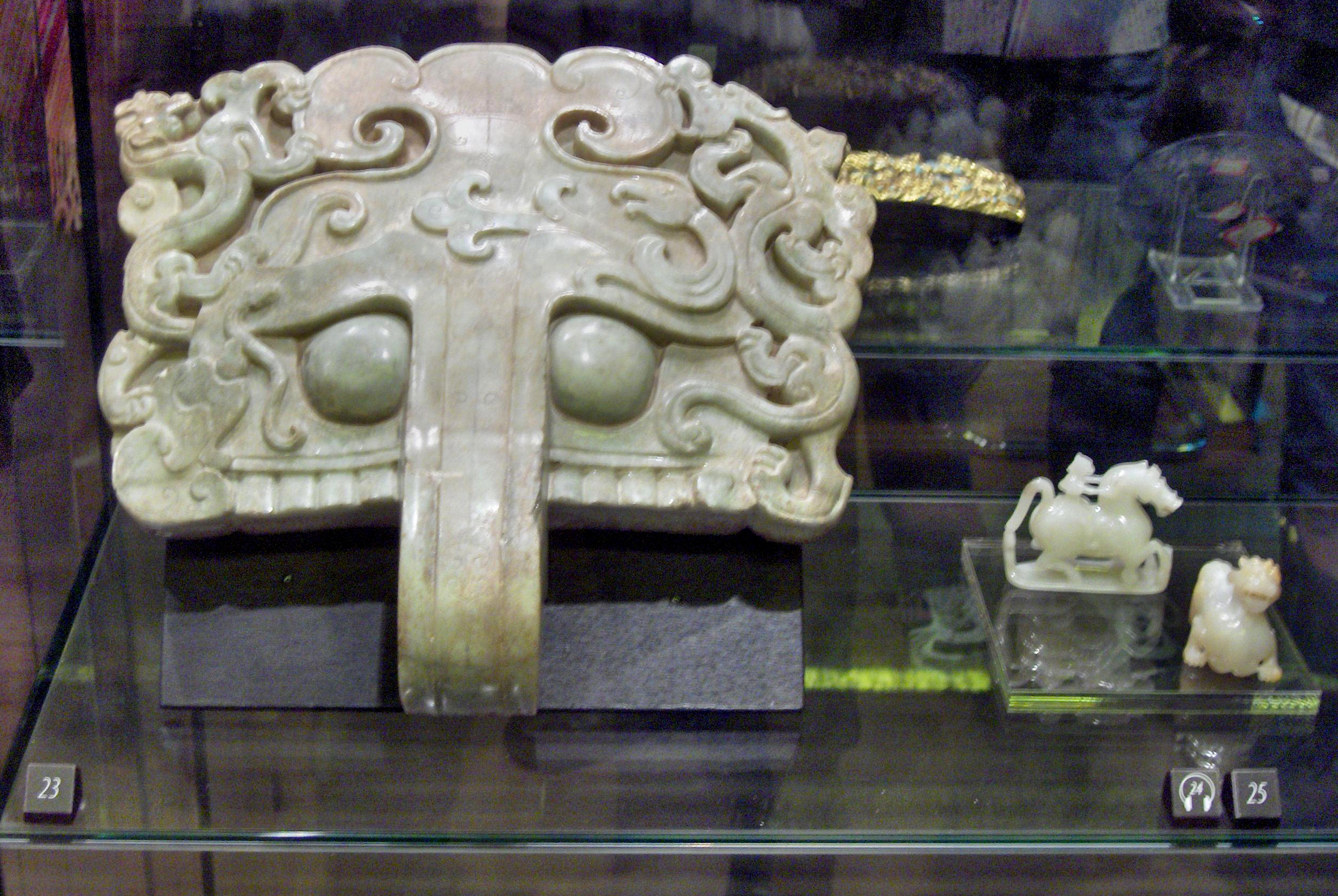
A jade-carved door knocker decorated with dragons, dated to the Western Han Era

During early Eastern Han, the loss of Han's control over the Ordos Desert prompted the Han court to reduce the provinces to twelve—excluding the capital region—in 35 AD. In that year, the Inspectors-cum-Governors were still appointed by the central government, but their staffs were recruited from local administrations where they were transferred. By 42 AD, the title Governor once more became Inspector, who remained the head of provincial authorities until 188 AD. In 188 AD, at the urging of the official Liu Yan, Emperor Ling reinstated the office of Governor, yet some of the provinces were still administered by Inspectors; this arrangement remained in place until the end of the Han dynasty in 220 AD. A key difference between the roles was that an Inspector had no executive powers and only an advisory role, whereas a Governor could execute decisions on his own behalf. There were exceptions to this rule. If banditry or rebellion simultaneously arose in several commanderies under his jurisdiction at once, the Inspector was authorized to raise troops throughout all commanderies under his watch and lead this united force as commander to quell the disruption.

Both the Inspector and Governor were responsible for inspecting commandery-level Administrators and their staffs, as well as the semi-autonomous kingdoms and their staffs. They evaluated officials on criteria of competence, honesty, obedience to the imperial court, adherence to the law, their treatment of convicts, and any signs of extortion, nepotism, or factionalism. These reports were submitted to the Palace Assistant Imperial Clerk and Imperial Counselor during Western Han, but by Eastern Han these reports were submitted to each of the Three Excellencies. The reports were then used to promote, demote, dismiss, or prosecute local officials.

Administrative structure of Han territory
Administrative unit	Administrator title	Appointment	Authority
Province (州 zhou)	Governor (牧 mu)	Central	Executive
Province (州 zhou)	Inspector (刺史 cishi)	Central	No direct authority
Commandery (郡 jun)	Grand administrator (太守 taishou)	Central	Executive
Kingdom (王國 wangguo)	Chancellor (相 xiang)	Central	Executive
Kingdom (王國 wangguo)	King (王 wang)	Hereditary	No real authority
County (縣 xian)	Prefect (令 ling); Chief (長 zhang)	Central	Executive

=== Commandery administration ===
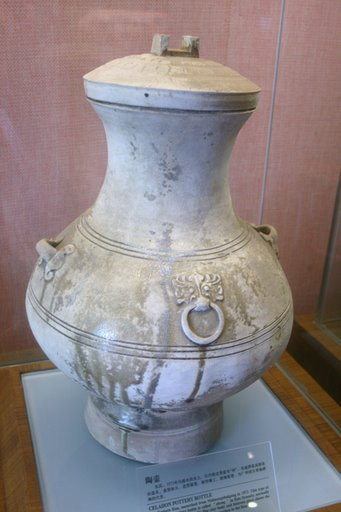
An Eastern-Han early celadon ceramic vase with lug handles and decorations of animalistic-faced (taotie) door knockers

There were thirteen commanderies, including the capital region, and ten kingdoms at the beginning of Western Han. Many kingdoms were reduced in size and the empire's territory expanded through conquest. By 2 AD there were eighty-three commanderies and twenty kingdoms containing an aggregate total of approximately 58 million people according to the census. A commandery consisted of a group of counties and was governed by an Administrator (Taishou 太守), also known as Grand Administrator, who was appointed by the central government and earned a 2,000-dan salary-rank. The Administrator was the civil and military leader of the commandery. He was not allowed to govern over his native commandery.

An Administrator was assisted by one or several Commandants (Duwei 都尉) also known as Chief Commandant, who handled all local military affairs such as raising militias, suppressing bandit groups, and building beacon towers. The Commandants' salary-rank was Equivalent to 2,000-dan. After 30 AD, all Commandants who were not located in distant frontier commanderies were abolished, yet if the commandery was located along borders where raids and armed incursions by hostile nomadic groups were frequent, he was still appointed. A Commandant in an interior commandery could only be appointed temporarily to deal with crises as they arose. Each commandery also had secretaries, a treasurer, and an Official in Charge of Accounts who submitted annual reports to the imperial court on the Administrator's performance.

Many of the Administrators' duties were seasonal, such as inspections of counties every spring to check on agriculture and maintain roads, bridges, dikes and other public works. In the fall he sent subordinates into the counties to report whether local criminal lawsuits had been conducted fairly. He was responsible for recommending worthy nominees, known as Filial and Incorrupt, to the capital at the end of each year during winter; the nominees would then be considered for an appointment to a central or local government office. This followed a system of quotas for each of the commanderies that was first established during Emperor Wu's reign, when two Filial and Incorrupt men from each commandery were sent to the capital. This was changed in 92 AD to one man for every 200,000 households in a commandery. After the Commandants of interior commanderies were abolished, the Administrators assumed their duties, yet they were still not allowed to raise militias, mobilize troops, or send troops outside their commandery without permission from the central government.

=== County administration ===
The nationwide census conducted in 2 AD listed 1,587 counties. The Han county was the smallest political division containing a centrally appointed official. In larger counties of about 10,000 households he was known as the Prefect (Ling 令); in smaller counties he was known as the Chief (Zhang 長). Depending on the size of the county, the Prefect's salary-rank was 600-dan or 1,000-dan, while a Chief was ranked at 300-dan or 500-dan. Due to their judicial role, historian Rafe de Crespigny does not differentiate between Prefects and Chiefs, referring to both as magistrate. The county's head civil servants, usually respected scholars or elders in their local communities, were appointed directly by the Magistrate.

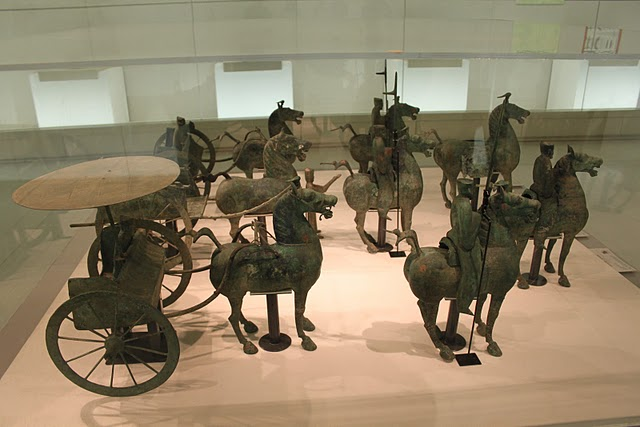
Eastern Han bronze chariot and cavalry figurines excavated from a tomb

A county Magistrate was in charge of maintaining law and order, storing grain in case of famine, registering the populace for taxation, mobilizing conscripted commoners for corvée labor projects, supervising public works, renovating schools, and performing rituals. They were also given the duty to act as judge for all lawsuits brought to the county court. The judicial jurisdictions of the commandery Administrator and county Magistrate overlapped, so it was generally agreed that whoever arrested a criminal first would try him or her. Under Emperor Wu, commanderies and kingdoms operated public schools, and although counties could operate their own public schools, not all of them did.

The county was further divided into districts, each consisting of at least several hamlets grouped together; typically a community of approximately one hundred families. A chief of police was assigned to each district by the county Magistrate. A county Magistrate heavily relied on the cooperation of local elders and leaders at the district level; these carried out much of the day-to-day affairs of arbitrating disputes in their communities, collecting taxes, and fighting crime.

=== Kingdoms, marquessates, and fiefs of princesses ===
A gilt-bronze oil lamp in the shape of a kneeling female servant wearing silk robes, dated to the Western Han Era

A Han kingdom was much like a commandery in size and administration, except it was officially, and after 145 BC, nominally, the fief of a relative to the emperor, including brothers, uncles, nephews, and sons—excluding the heir apparent. The policy of awarding kingdoms only to imperial relatives was gradually adopted by the founder Emperor Gaozu of Han (r. 202–195 BC), as many of the early kings were non-relatives who were leading officers during the Chu-Han contention (206–202 BC). Kingdoms were usually inherited by the king's eldest son born to his queen.

The number of kingdoms fluctuated between Western and Eastern Han, but there were never fewer than eight nor greater than twenty-five. In early Western Han, the kingdoms accounted for approximately two-thirds of the empire. The imperial court ruled over the commanderies located in the western third of the empire, while kings ruled their fiefs with little or no central government intervention. The administrative staffs of each kingdom paralleled the model of central government, as each kingdom had a Grand Tutor, Chancellor, and Imperial Secretary (all ranked 2,000-dan). No kingdom was allowed to have a Grand Commandant, since they were not allowed to initiate war campaigns on their own behalf. Although the kingdoms' Chancellors were appointed by the imperial court, the king had the right to appoint all other officials in his fief.

The power of the kings declined after the Rebellion of the Seven States in 154 BC; the number of kingdoms and their sizes were reduced. An imperial edict in 145 BC removed the kings' rights to appoint officials above the salary-rank of 400-dan, and all officials ranked higher than this were appointed directly by the central government. Excluding the kingdom-level Minister Coachman, the kingdoms' Nine Ministers and Imperial Counselors were abolished. The Chancellor, now the equivalent of a commandery Administrator, was retained, although he was still appointed by the central government. After these reforms, the kings were no longer administrative heads and merely took a portion of the taxes collected by the government in their kingdoms as personal income. Charles Hucker notes that after this transformation of kingdoms and marquessates into virtual commanderies and counties, respectively, a "... fully centralized government was achieved" for the first time since the Qin dynasty.

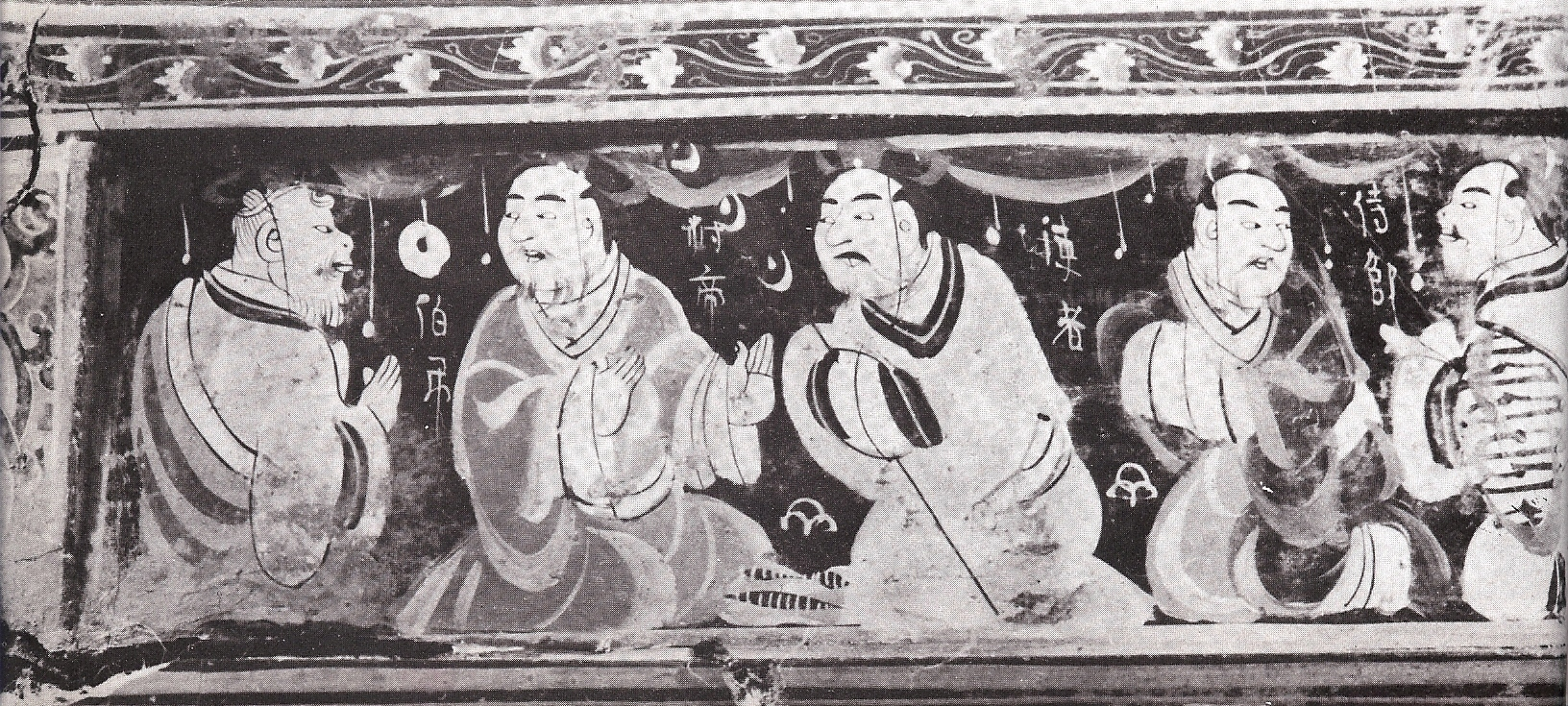
Paragons of filial piety, Chinese painted artwork on a lacquered basketwork box excavated from an Eastern-Han tomb of what was the Chinese Lelang Commandery in modern North Korea.

Han society below the level of kings was divided into twenty ranks, which awarded certain privileges such as exemption from certain laws, the nineteenth being a marquess and the twentieth being a full marquess—the difference being the former was only given a pension while the latter was given a marquessate (houguo 侯國)—typically the size of a county. If the kings' sons were grandsons of the emperor, they were made full marquesses; if not, they were considered commoners. However, this rule was changed in 127 BC so that all the kings' sons were made full marquesses. It is unknown whether early Western-Han marquessates enjoyed the same level of autonomy as early Western-Han kingdoms; by 145 BC, all marquessates' staff were appointed by the central government. The marquess had no administrative role over his marquessate; he merely collected a portion of the tax revenues. His Chancellor was the equivalent of a county Prefect.

The emperor's sisters and daughters were made either senior princesses, who shared the same rank as kings, or princesses, who shared the same rank as full marquesses; a princess's fief was typically the size of a county. The husband of a princess was ranked as a marquess. The daughters of kings were also princesses, but their fiefs were typically the smaller size of county districts, and could not be inherited by sons. Unlike the fiefs of kings and marquesses, the staffs of the princesses' fiefs answered directly to one of the Nine Ministers: the Minister of the Imperial Clan.

== Military ==
=== Conscripted soldiers and militias ===
Upon reaching the age of twenty-three, male commoners became eligible for conscription into the armed forces (zhengzu 正卒) for one year of training and one year of service; the year of service could be served until the age of fifty-six. Conscripts were trained, and would serve in one of three branches of the military: infantry, cavalry, or naval marine. The year of service could take the form of soldiering at frontier garrisons protecting the borders against nomadic enemies, serving as guards in the courts of kings or as guards under the Minister of the Guards in the capital. By 155 BC, the minimum age for conscription was lowered to twenty. During Emperor Zhao of Han's (r. 87–74 BC) reign, the minimum age was raised to twenty-three, but after his reign it was once again reduced to twenty.

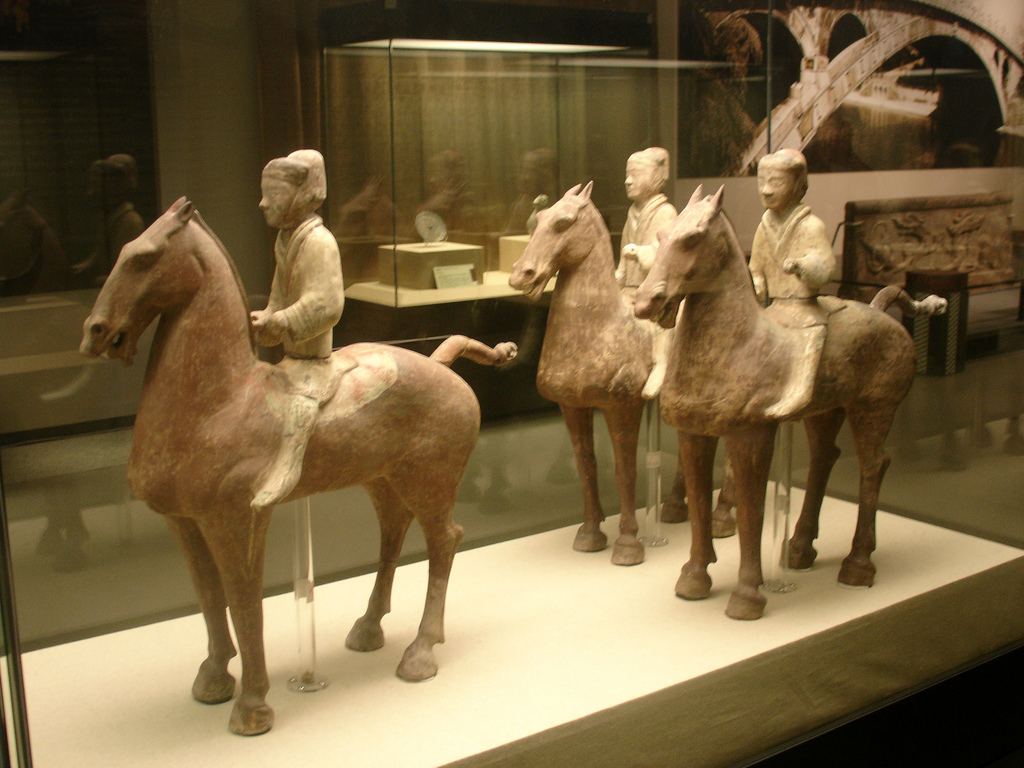
Western-Han ceramic statues of cavalrymen on horseback

Although this system of conscription survived into Eastern Han, conscription could be avoided upon payment of a commutable tax.

The government also exempted those who presented authorities with a slave, a horse, or grain. In the system of twenty ranks bestowed on commoners and nobles alike, those of the ninth rank and above were exempt from military service. To compensate for the loss of manpower, the Eastern Han government favored the recruitment of a largely volunteer army. Many other soldiers in Eastern Han were convicted criminals who commuted their sentences by joining the army. Mercenaries eventually comprised much of the capital guard, while foreign nomadic tribes were often employed to guard the frontiers.

After their year of active service, Western Han-era soldiers were demobilized and sent home, where they were obligated to join the local militia that convened every eighth month of the year. This obligation was intended to curb local and regional warlordism that nonetheless became prevalent by the end of Han. Militias dismissed members who reached the age of fifty-six. By Eastern Han, the obligation upon retired soldiers to join local militias was removed.

=== Standing army and army reserves ===
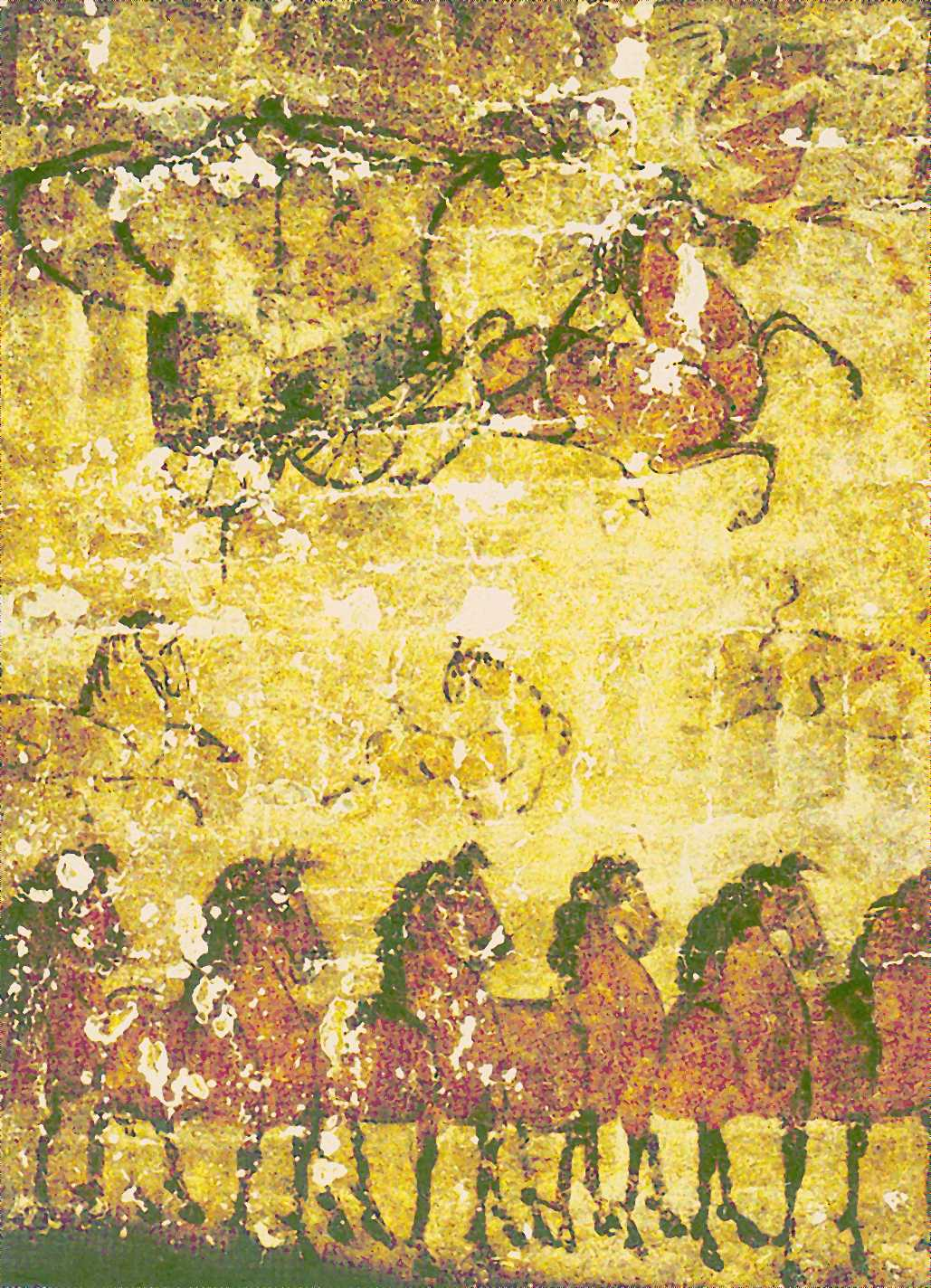
Carts and horses going out, 137cm x 201 cm, Eastern Han dynasty; one of 57 murals from the Nei Menggu Helingeer (or Holingor) Tomb in Inner Mongolia belonging to a prominent official, landowner, and colonel of the Wuhuan Army

The non-professional conscripted soldiers who served a one-year term under the Minister of the Guards belonged to the Southern Army (Nanjun 南軍). Non-conscripted, professional soldiers belonged to a standing army known as the Northern Army (Beijun 北軍). The Northern Army's main purpose was to defend the capital, but it was sometimes required to repel foreign invasions. The Northern Army is first mentioned in Han records in about 180 BC, yet little is known of its command structure at that time. Several decades later, Emperor Wu reformed the Northern Army's officer corps so that its command was shared by five Colonels (Xiaowei 校尉) who each ranked 2,000-dan and commanded a regiment. Emperor Wu also appointed three other Colonels, ranked 2,000-dan, whose forces were considered an extension of the Northern Army yet were stationed far outside the capital at strategic passes. Each of the eight Colonels was assisted by a Major (Sima 司馬) who was ranked at 1,000-dan. Professional soldiers could also be found in agricultural garrisons established in the Western Regions, such as those led by the Wu and Ji Colonels (Wuji xiaowei 戊己校尉), who were ranked Equivalent to 600-dan and were based at the Turpan oasis.

During Eastern Han, the conscripted army largely gave way to a volunteer army. The conscripted army under the Minister of the Guards was no longer referred to as the Southern Army. The Northern Army was retained, although it was reformed so that there were five Colonels instead of eight. The Eastern Han-era Colonels of the Northern Army were also demoted to the rank of Equivalent to 2,000-dan.

According to Eastern Han-era sources, the Northern Army was a relatively small fighting force of between 3,500 and 4,200 professional soldiers, each regiment consisting of approximately 750 soldiers and 150 junior officers. To aid this force, Emperor Guangwu established a 1,000-soldier unit of army reserves in Liyang County along the Yellow River in 43 AD, while two other reserve units were created in 110 AD; these were headed by a Commandant (the same title used for the commandery-level military officer). The main purpose of these reserve units was to position Han troops at strategic passes to guard the lower Wei River against Xiongnu, Wuhuan, and Tibetan tribes.

=== Wartime militia and officers ===
During peacetime and war, the command structure of the Northern Army remained the same. However, during times of great conflict and crisis, the raising of large militias required the appointment of many new officers with various titles, which were often bestowed as honorary titles to officials during times of peace. Large divisions were led by a General (Jiangjun 將軍) whose rank depended on status; divisions were divided into a number of regiments commanded by a Colonel, and sometimes by a Major. Regiments were divided into companies and led by Captains, who ranked Equivalent to 2,000-dan, while companies were further divided into platoons.

== See also ==
- Hanguan yi
- Comparative studies of the Roman and Han empires
- Government of the Ming dynasty
- Government of the Qing dynasty
- Political systems of Imperial China
- Translation of Han dynasty titles – Translation of Han dynasty government titles into English
