= Ying Shao =

Eastern Han writer and historian (died 204)

- 應劭

Colonel who Advises the Army (軍謀校尉) (under Yuan Shao)
- In office ? – 203

Administrator of Taishan (泰山太守)
- In office 189 – 194
- Monarchs: Emperor Ling of Han / Emperor Xian of Han

Registrar of Runan (汝南主簿)
- In office 177 – 184
- Monarch: Emperor Ling of Han

Gentleman Official (郎官)
- In office 173 – 177
- Monarch: Emperor Ling of Han

Managing Military Scribe (御史營令)
- In office ?–?
- Monarch: Emperor Ling of Han

Prefect of Xiao (County) (蕭令)
- In office 178 – ?
- Monarch: Emperor Ling of Han

Personal details
- Born: c.144 Xiangcheng, Henan
- Died: 204 Handan, Hebei
- Relations: Ying Xun (應珣; younger brother); Ying Yang (應瑒; (Note: The character "瑒" has two pronunciations: "chàng" and "yáng".) nephew); Ying Qu (應璩; 190 (Note: Zhu Jianping's biography in vol. 29 of Sanguozhi recorded that Ying Qu was 63 (by East Asian reckoning) when he died.) – 252; nephew and younger brother of Ying Yang); Ying Zhen (應貞; died 269; grandnephew and son of Ying Qu); Ying Chun (應純; grandnephew and younger brother of Ying Zhen)
- Parent: Ying Feng (應奉) (father)
- Occupation: Politician, writer, historian
- Courtesy name: Zhongyuan (仲瑗) also spelt 仲援 or 仲遠

Ying Shao (c.144–204), courtesy name Zhongyuan, was a Chinese politician, writer and historian who lived during the Eastern Han dynasty. He was an author of the Fengsu Tongyi, an encyclopedic work about the folk customs and legends that existed in the Eastern Han dynasty. Ying Shao occupied official posts in the Han government, (Note: Ying Shao's biography in Book of the Later Han did not mention that he served as Prefect of Xiao (County) or Managing Military Scribe; these positions were recorded by Yan Shigu in his Hanshu Xuli (漢書叙例). In his Fengsu Tongyi, Ying Shao wrote about his various appointments. Quan Houhan Wen also collected most of his extant writings, including fragments of Fengsu Tongyi which are not part of the 10 complete chapters.) and in his official position he was an active participant in imperial politics. He was a long-time close associate of Cao Cao; he was extensively covered in the historical text Book of the Later Han. (Note: Hou Hanshu: vol. 48 contains Ying Shao's biography. He is also mentioned in vol. 9, Annals of Emperor Xian of Han; vol. 35, Biography of Zheng Xuan; and vol. 71, Biography of Zhu Jun. Ying Shao is also quoted in commentaries in vol. 9 and vol. 103.)

== Life ==
Ying Shao was from Nandun County (南頓縣), Runan Commandery (汝南郡), which is located west of present-day Xiangcheng, Henan. He was nominated as a xiaolian during the reign of Emperor Ling of Han, and later served as a minor official under He Miao, Empress He's half-brother From 189 to 194, Ying Shao served as the Administrator of Taishan Commandery in Xu Province. Around December 191, he repelled an attack on his commandery by the remnants of the Yellow Turban rebels, recorded in the Book of the Later Han. In 193 and 194, the warlord Cao Cao attacked Xu Province to seek vengeance for the murder of his father Cao Song. Thus, Ying Shao fled from Taishan Commandery and took refuge under Cao Cao's rival Yuan Shao. By the time Cao Cao defeated the Yuan family and conquered the Hebei region, Ying Shao was already dead. The interim events are given in two versions in Pei Songzhi's annotations to the Records of the Three Kingdoms, the Wei Jin Shiyu (魏晉世語) by Guo Song (郭頒), and Wei Zhao's Book of Wu (吳書). Ying Shao eventually died in Ye city.

== See also ==
- Hanguan yi
- Lists of people of the Three Kingdoms
