= Hanguan yi =

2nd-century Chinese text on Han governance

Hanguan yi (simplified Chinese: 汉官议; traditional Chinese: 漢官儀; pinyin: Hànguān yì; Wade–Giles: Han-kuan i, “Ceremonial of Han Offices”) is a work by Ying Shao (应劭) from the 2nd century. It is a significant historical source for understanding Han-dynasty governance.

== Content ==
A printed copy of Hanguan yi, from the Shanghai Library

The work describes the official system and bureaucratic structure of the Han dynasty; it is therefore often cited in works on Chinese administration and the history of that period.

Ying Shao presented in the work “a quantity of material on the conduct of the court, gathered from his own notes and recollections” (Rafe de Crespigny). In the words of Chinaknowledge, the book “enumerated each office, designations, jurisdictions and duties, salaries and income, seals as well as some miscellaneous stories about the individual offices and office bearers”.

In the Bibliographical Treatise of the Book of Sui (Suishu, Jingjizhi), it is stated: “Hanguan yi, in ten juan (scrolls), composed by Ying Shao”. In the second year of the Jian'an era, Emperor Xian of (Eastern) Han was relocated to Xudu. As “the old institutional regulations had been lost and written records had become rare” (舊章堙沒，書記罕存), as the Book of the Later Han (Hou Hanshu) writes, Ying Shao deeply lamented this situation and therefore composed this work.

Hanguan liu zhong (漢官六種)

The Hanguan yi is regarded as the most systematic and detailed of the six works on Han officials (Hanguan liu zhong 汉官六种 / 漢官六種).

The Hanyu da zidian, for example, uses the edition of the Pingjinguan congshu 平津馆丛书.

== See also ==
- Hanguan liu zhong 汉官六种 (Chinese)

== Bibliography ==
- Rafe de Crespigny: A Biographical Dictionary of Later Han to the Three Kingdoms (23–220 AD). 2006 (article: Ying Shao)
