= Dingyuan =

Dingyuan (simplified Chinese: 定远; traditional Chinese: 定遠) may refer to:

- Chinese turret ship Dingyuan, a Qing dynasty turret ship

== Places in China ==
- Dingyuan County, a county in Chuzhou, Anhui
- Dingyuan, Gansu, a town in Yuzhong County, Gansu

=== Townships ===
- Dingyuan Township, Henan, in Luoshan County, Henan
- Dingyuan Township, Qu County, in Qu County, Sichuan
- Dingyuan Township, Zitong County, in Zitong County, Sichuan

== See also ==
- Ding Yuan (died 189), warlord during the Han dynasty
