= Yang Yi (Shu Han) =

Shu Han state official (died 235)

- 楊儀
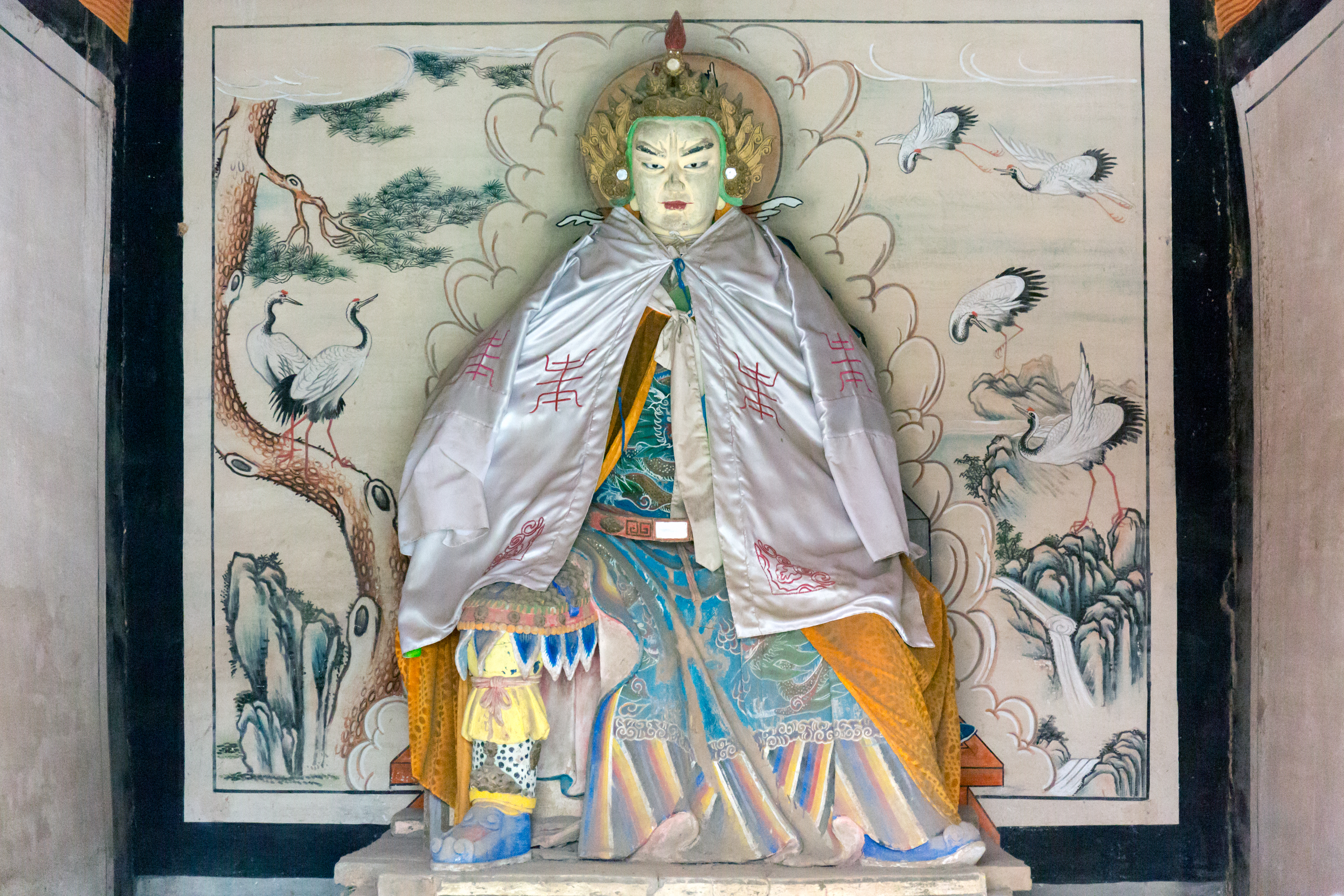
- Statue of Yang Yi in the Zhuge Liang Memorial Temple in the Wuzhang Plains, Shaanxi

Central Military Adviser (中軍師)
- In office 234 – 235
- Monarch: Liu Shan

General Who Pacifies the Army (綏軍將軍)
- In office 230 – 234
- Monarch: Liu Shan
- Chancellor: Zhuge Liang

Chief Clerk of the Imperial Chancellor (丞相長史)
- In office 230 – 234
- Monarch: Liu Shan
- Chancellor: Zhuge Liang

Army Adviser (參軍)
- In office 225 – 230
- Monarch: Liu Shan
- Chancellor: Zhuge Liang

Administrator of Hongnong (弘農太守) (nominal)
- In office 222 – 225
- Monarch: Liu Bei / Liu Shan
- Chancellor: Zhuge Liang

Master of Writing (尚書)
- In office 219 – 222
- Monarch: Liu Bei
- Chancellor: Zhuge Liang

Personal details
- Born: Unknown Xiangyang, Hubei
- Died: 235 Lushan County, Sichuan
- Occupation: Official
- Courtesy name: Weigong (威公)

Yang Yi (died March or April 235), courtesy name Weigong, was an official of the state of Shu Han in the Three Kingdoms period of China.

== Early life and career ==
Yang Yi was from Xiangyang Commandery in Jing Province, which is around present-day Xiangyang, Hubei. He was born sometime in the late Eastern Han dynasty and initially served as a Registrar (主簿) under Fu Qun (傅羣), the Inspector (刺史) of Jing Province. However, later, he defected to Guan Yu, a general under the warlord Liu Bei. Guan Yu appointed Yang Yi as an Officer of Merit (功曹) and sent him to Chengdu – the capital of Yi Province, which covered present-day Sichuan and Chongqing – to meet Liu Bei. Liu Bei had a discussion with Yang Yi on military strategy and politics and was so pleased with his replies that he appointed Yang Yi as a Senior Clerk (掾) in his administrative office. (Note: Liu Bei held the nominal title of General of the Left (左將軍) under the Han central government, so the full name of Yang Yi's appointment was "Senior Clerk in the Military Affairs Bureau of the Office of the General of the Left" (左將軍兵曹掾).) He promoted Yang Yi to a Master of Writing (尚書) in 219 after declaring himself "King of Hanzhong" (漢中王) following his victory in the Hanzhong Campaign.

In 221, Liu Bei declared himself emperor and founded the state of Shu Han to challenge Cao Pi's claim to the Han throne. (Note: Cao Pi ended the Han dynasty in late 220 by forcing the last Han ruler, Emperor Xian, to abdicate the throne in his favour. After that, he established the state of Cao Wei with him as its first emperor. This event marked the official beginning of the Three Kingdoms period.) In the following year, when Liu Bei was away on a military campaign against his ally-turned-rival Sun Quan, Yang Yi offended Liu Ba, the Prefect of the Masters of Writing (尚書令). Liu Ba reassigned Yang Yi to be the Administrator of Hongnong Commandery (弘農郡; around present-day Lingbao City, Henan); this was only a nominal appointment because Hongnong Commandery was not Shu territory.

== Mid career ==
After Liu Bei's death in 223, Yang Yi continued serving in Shu under Liu Bei's son and successor, Liu Shan, who was assisted by the Imperial Chancellor, Zhuge Liang. In 225, Zhuge Liang had Yang Yi transferred to the Imperial Chancellor's Office, where Yang Yi served as an Army Adviser (參軍). Later that year, Yang Yi followed Zhuge Liang on a campaign against some rebel forces and restless tribes in the southern parts of Shu. In 227, he accompanied Zhuge Liang to Hanzhong Commandery. In 230, he was promoted to Chief Clerk (長史) and appointed as General Who Pacifies the Army (綏軍將軍). Over the following years, when Zhuge Liang led a series of military campaigns against Shu's rival state Cao Wei, Yang Yi was in charge of managing human resources and logistics.

Yang Yi had disagreements with Wei Yan, a senior Shu general, and frequently quarrelled with him. Wei Yan often drew his sword and brandished it in front of Yang Yi; Yang Yi sobbed as tears rolled down his cheeks. Fei Yi then stepped in to stop them from fighting and managed to keep them under control until Zhuge Liang's death. Zhuge Liang was upset by the lack of harmony between Yang Yi and Wei Yan, but was unwilling to side with either of them because he appreciated the talents of both men. In 234, Yang Yi followed Zhuge Liang on another campaign against Cao Wei which led to the stalemate at the Battle of Wuzhang Plains. Zhuge Liang died of illness during the standoff, after which Yang Yi and the others ordered a retreat to Shu. Around this time, relations between Yang Yi and Wei Yan deteriorated the point of conflict – they accused each other of treason and nearly started a civil war in Shu. The conflict concluded with the downfall and death of Wei Yan. (Note: See Wei Yan#Death for details.)

== Later life and death ==
After returning to Chengdu, Yang Yi thought that he had made great contributions so he strongly believed that he would be chosen to succeed Zhuge Liang as the new head of the Shu government. He asked one Zhao Zheng (趙正) to use the I Ching to predict his fortune for him and felt gloomy when the prediction was not to his expectation. When Zhuge Liang was still alive, he had secretly noted that Yang Yi was impulsive and narrow-minded, so he chose Jiang Wan to be his successor. After Zhuge Liang's death, Jiang Wan was appointed as the Prefect of the Masters of Writing (尚書令) and the Inspector (刺史) of Yi Province; Yang Yi, on the other hand, was appointed as a Central Military Adviser (中軍師) – an appointment with no actual power.

Initially, when Yang Yi was serving as a Master of Writing (尚書), Jiang Wan ranked lower than him, but both of them were later appointed as Chief Clerks under Zhuge Liang. Yang Yi viewed himself highly and saw himself as superior to Jiang Wan because he had been serving in Shu longer than Jiang Wan. He openly expressed his dissatisfaction by grumbling and complaining. The others ignored him due to his poor choice of words in conveying his frustration except Fei Yi, who comforted him. Yang Yi once told Fei Yi, "When the Imperial Chancellor (Zhuge Liang) died, I should have brought along my men and defected to Wei if I knew I'd end up in this situation today! I deeply regret but there's nothing I can do now." Fei Yi secretly reported Yang Yi's speech to the Shu government. In early 235, Yang Yi was removed from office, demoted to the status of a commoner, and exiled to Hanjia Commandery (漢嘉郡; around present-day Lushan County, Sichuan). While he was in Hanjia Commandery, Yang Yi wrote a memorial to the Shu imperial court and used emotionally charged language to express his frustration and lash out at the imperial court. The imperial court found Yang Yi guilty of contempt of imperial authority and ordered his arrest. Yang Yi committed suicide. His family returned to Chengdu after his death.

== Yang Lü ==
Yang Yi had an elder brother, Yang Lü (楊慮), whose courtesy name was Weifang (威方). Yang Lü was already known for his good moral conduct in his youth and was regarded as a learned scholar in the Jing Province region. He received several invitations to serve in the government but declined all of them. He died at the age of 16. His fellow townsfolk referred to him as "Lord Yang of Virtuous Conduct" (德行楊君).

== See also ==
- Lists of people of the Three Kingdoms
