= Nangan =

Nangan may refer to:

- Nangan, Lienchiang (南竿鄉) (Matsu Island), one of the Matsu Islands and the chief township of Lienchiang County, Republic of China (Taiwan)
- Nangan, Luoshan County (楠杆镇), town in Luoshan County, Henan, People's Republic of China
