= Battle of Xingshi =

Battle between Cao Wei and Shu Han forces (244)

- Part of the wars of the Three Kingdoms period
| Date | April (Note: The campaign started in the 3rd month of the 4th year of the Zhengshi era of Cao Fang's reign. This month corresponds to 26 March to 24 April 244 in the Gregorian calendar.) – July 244 (Note: The troops retreated in the 5th month of the 4th year of the Zhengshi era of Cao Fang's reign. This month corresponds to 23 June to 21 July 244 in the Gregorian calendar.) |
| Location | Mount Xingshi (situated north of present-day Yang County, Shaanxi), China |
| Result | Shu Han victory |

Belligerents
| Cao Wei | Shu Han |

Commanders and leaders
| Cao Shuang; Xiahou Xuan | Fei Yi; Wang Ping |

Strength
| More than 100,000 in total Main army of 60,000–70,000 from Chang'an | Less than 30,000 under Wang Ping and Liu Min; Unknown number of troops under Fei Yi |

Casualties and losses
| Unknown | Unknown |

Battle of Xingshi
- Traditional Chinese: 興勢之戰
- Simplified Chinese: 兴势之战
Transcriptions
Standard Mandarin
- Hanyu Pinyin: Xīngshì Zhī Zhàn

The Battle of Xingshi was fought between the states of Cao Wei and Shu Han in 244 during the Three Kingdoms period in China. The location was at Mount Xingshi (興勢山), which is situated north of present-day Yang County, Shaanxi, and is now part of the Changqing National Nature Reserve. The battle was an attempt by Cao Shuang, the regent of Wei, to conquer Wei's rival state, Shu. It ended in complete failure.

== Background ==
Despite facing strong opposition in the Wei court, Cao Shuang believed that the campaign was viable, especially when the Shu commander, Jiang Wan, withdrew his main force from Hanzhong to Fu County (涪縣) in October 243. Cao Shuang and his protégés concluded that with numerical superiority, their army could easily conquer Hanzhong before Shu reinforcements arrive. Even if they failed to eliminate Shu, the fall of Hanzhong would be sufficient to increase Cao Shuang's fame and influence in the Wei court.

After the battle of Hanzhong, Wei Yan was appointed as the Administrator of Hanzhong (漢中太守). During his tenure, he built several fortified outposts at strategic locations on the roads leading to Hanzhong then would garrison them with elite soldiers. Although enemy forces would assault them, they were beaten back. Those outposts were still active by the time of the battle of Xingshi. Wang Ping would use those previous arrangements to achieve his victory against Cao Shuang's forces.

== Geography ==
The three traditional passages from Hanzhong to Guanzhong were all valleys in the Qin Mountains. Meridian Trail in the east is the longest, totalling more than 330 km, with its northern end located to the south of Chang'an. The southern half of the valley was called Zi Valley (子谷) and the northern half was called Wu Valley (午谷). The rugged local terrain provided numerous spots that were perfect for ambushes, and whoever sets up ambushes could easily and completely annihilate the opposing side travelling in the valley, and thus this longest route was also the most dangerous. However, if Shu was on the offensive, it could easily threaten Chang'an by taking this route, and that was the exact suggestion Wei Yan proposed to Zhuge Liang before the first Northern Expedition. The 235 km long Baoxie Trail (褒斜道) located in the west had the best road condition among all three traditional passages, with the northern half called Xie Valley (斜谷) and the south half Bao Valley (褒谷). The southern end of the Baoxie Trail was located around 25 km north of Hanzhong, while its northern end was located 15 km to the south of present-day Mei County, Shaanxi. In the center of Baoxie Trail, another valley called Ji Valley (箕谷) branched out westward, and then turned northward, eventually ending near Chencang (陳倉), a strategic stronghold that would be threatened if Shu was on the offensive. If Wei was on the offensive and took the initiative, the good road condition would mean that Shu could deploy their defensive force quicker and stop the attack before Wei force could get out of the valley.

The 210 km long Tangluo Trail (儻駱道) in the centre was the shortest among all three, and it got its name from the geographical locations at its ends. The southern end was located next to the Tangshui River (儻水河) in present-day Yang County, Shaanxi, and the northern end was located in the Luo Ravine (駱峪) to the west of present-day Zhouzhi County, Shaanxi. Hence, the southern half was called Tang Valley (儻谷) and the northern half was called Luo Valley (駱谷). Cao Shuang chose this central route to attack Shu, which proved to be a grave strategic blunder. Although it was the shortest, the road condition was the poorest among all three routes. More importantly, it also had the longest section among the three routes with no water source. As a result, logistical problems crippled the invasion force, with many if not most of the packing animals of the Wei army dying of thirst before even getting out of the valley. Cao Shuang was forced to mobilise tens of thousands of draftees as coolies to carry supplies, and many of them met the same fate as the packing animals. Consequently, morale plummeted and resentment of Cao Shuang not only drastically increased among the troops he commanded, but also back home in Wei.

== Battle ==
In April 244, Cao Shuang promoted Xiahou Xuan to General Who Subdues the West, and the Inspector of Yong Province, Guo Huai, was appointed as the vanguard commander. Together, they began the march toward Hanzhong via Tangluo Trail. Cao Shuang's protégés, Deng Yang and Li Sheng, participated in the invasion as his staff officers. The primary target of the Wei invasion force was Yangping Pass (陽平關; located west of present-day Wuhou Town (武侯鎮), Mian County, Shaanxi).

Shu's Senior General Who Guards the North, Wang Ping, was in charge of defending Hanzhong, but his force totalled less than 30,000. Facing absolute numerical inferiority, some Shu commanders suggested concentrating on defending Hancheng (漢城; east of present-day Mian County, Shaanxi) and Yuecheng (樂城; east of present-day Chenggu County, Shaanxi). Wang Ping rejected the idea because reinforcements were too far away, and it would be a disaster for Shu if the enemy was allowed to pass through Yangping Pass unopposed. Therefore, the enemy could only be stopped by taking advantage of the rugged local terrain. Wang Ping ordered the General Who Protects the Army, Liu Min, to take up a position in Mount Xingshi (興勢山) and plant an array of flags over a hundred miles long to create the illusion that the Shu defense force was larger than it actually was. Wang Ping then personally led an army behind Liu Min to prevent possible separate assaults by Wei forces from Huangjin Valley (黃金谷; located east of Mount Xingshi). As Wang Ping had correctly predicted, by May 244, the enemy advance had been successfully checked at Mount Xingshi. Their supplies were depleting as their supply lines were overextended and nearly all their transport animals were dead. Shu's General-in-Chief, Fei Yi, was on his way to Hanzhong with reinforcements from Chengdu. The counter-offensive of Shu Han was about to be launched against the overstretched Wei invasion army.

Cao Shuang's staff officer Yang Wei (楊偉) realised the danger and begged Cao to abandon the campaign and retreat immediately, but Deng Yang objected and argued with Yang despite his lack of military knowledge. Yang Wei could not convince either and furiously claimed that Deng Yang and Li Sheng were disregarding the lives of hundreds of thousands, as well as the fate of their state, and they should be executed. Both of them fought in front of Cao Shuang who was unhappy with such situation. Grand Tutor Sima Yi, who opposed the campaign from the very beginning, could no longer ignore the dangerous situation and wrote to Xiahou Xuan to inform him about the impending disaster, and warned him that he was personally aware that years ago, Cao Cao almost suffered a total defeat in the struggle against Liu Bei for Hanzhong. The Shu army was in firm control of Mount Xingshi, which prevented Wei forces from pushing forward, and if another Shu force cut off the Wei retreat route, Cao Shuang and Xiahou Xuan would not even be able to live to regret their decisions. Xiahou Xuan finally realised the dangerous situation they were in after reading Sima Yi's letter, and finally managed to convince Cao Shuang to give the order to retreat, albeit the latter did so reluctantly. Guo Huai, by then the commander of the vanguard forces, also realised the danger of their situation and preemptively withdrew his troops. Therefore, Guo Huai's tropps did not suffer serious losses and for this he was awarded imperial authority by the Wei government following the army's return.

Fei Yi, however, would not let Cao Shuang retreat so easily, and led his army to flank the Wei troops and block their retreat. Shu forces set up defensive positions in the places where they enjoyed absolute geographical advantage over the Wei army: the three ridges in the Luo Valley: Shen Ridge (沈嶺), Ya Ridge (衙嶺), and Fenshui Ridge (分水嶺). Cao Shuang's forces fought a desperate battle. In the end, Cao Shuang and his officers were barely able to escape back to Guanzhong. Almost all the cattle and horses Cao Shuang had levied for transport either died or were lost. The ethnic tribes of the North greatly resented him for this and the Guanzhong region became a wasteland. Following this failure, people would ridicule Cao Shuang and Xiahou Xuan.

== Aftermath ==
For his victory, Fei Yi was awarded the title of "Marquis of Chengxiang" (成鄉侯), and stayed in Hanzhong until his return to the capital Chengdu in September 244. In contrast, the prestige and popularity of Cao Shuang dropped sharply, which helped lead to his eventual downfall in the power struggle against Sima Yi. After this defeat, Wei would wait twenty years before launching another conquest of Shu.

== Analysis ==
The Battle of Xingshi was one of the most important yet most understated battles of the Three Kingdoms period. The lack of participation of the principal figures of the time such as Zhuge Liang and Jiang Wei caused many writers to put much less emphasis on or even ignore the battle, compared to other battles that occurred in that era. This battle showed that the state of Shu-Han still benefited from superior military commanders.

Despite being relatively unnoticed in literature, later militarists gave high credit to the battle: For example, Ming dynasty military strategist Liu Bowen, in his work titled The Unexpected Strategies of a Hundred Battles (百戰奇略), classified this battle as a classic example of a "retreating war" (退戰). This meant that if the enemy held absolute geographical advantage and you were already having trouble carrying on the fight, a rapid retreat was the only viable option.

== Order of battle ==
Wei forces

- General-in-Chief (大將軍) Cao Shuang, commander-in-chief
  - General Who Subdues the West (征西將軍) Xiahou Xuan, deputy commander-in-chief
  - Inspector of Yong Province (雍州刺史) Guo Huai, commander of the vanguard

Shu forces

- General-in-Chief (大將軍) Fei Yi, commander-in-chief
  - Senior General Who Guards the North (鎮北大將軍) Wang Ping
  - General Who Protects the Army (護軍將軍) Liu Min
