= Fei Yi =

Shu Han state regent and general (died 253)

- 費禕
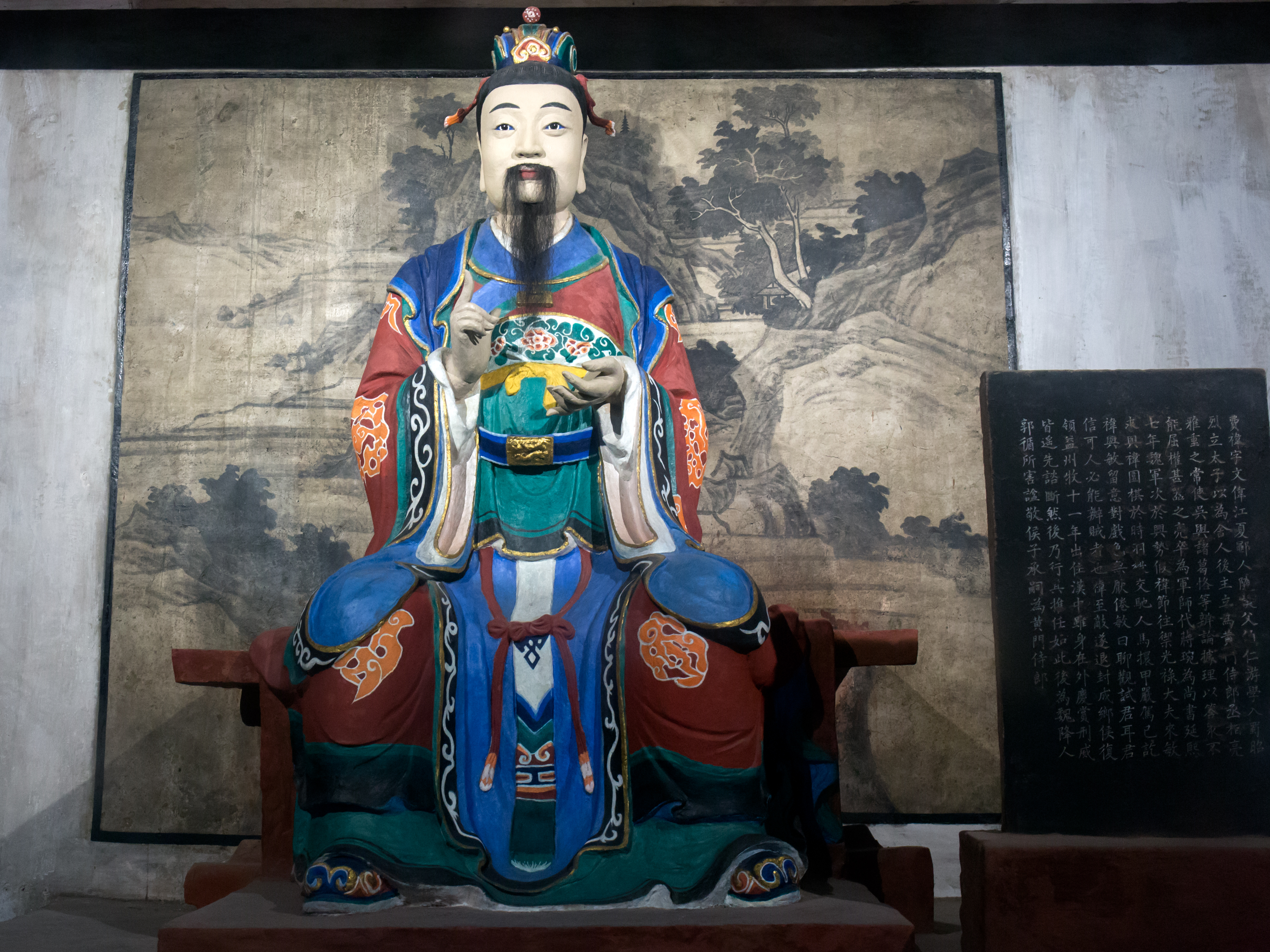
- Statue of Fei Yi in the Zhuge Liang Memorial Temple in Chengdu, Sichuan

General-in-Chief (大將軍)
- In office November or December 243 – 16 February 253
- Monarch: Liu Shan
- Preceded by: Jiang Wan
- Succeeded by: Jiang Wei

Manager of the Affairs of the Masters of Writing (錄尚書事) (jointly held with Jiang Wei from 247)
- In office November or December 243 – 16 February 253
- Monarch: Liu Shan
- Preceded by: Jiang Wan
- Succeeded by: Jiang Wei

Inspector of Yi Province (益州刺史)
- In office 244 – 16 February 253
- Monarch: Liu Shan
- Preceded by: Jiang Wan

Prefect of the Masters of Writing (尚書令)
- In office May 235 – 244
- Monarch: Liu Shan
- Preceded by: Jiang Wan
- Succeeded by: Dong Yun

Personal details
- Born: Unknown Luoshan County, Henan
- Died: 16 February 253 (Note: Fei Yi's biography in the Sanguozhi recorded that he was assassinated on the 1st day of the 1st month of the 16th year of the Yanxi era of Liu Shan's reign. This date corresponds to 16 February 253 in the Gregorian calendar. Liu Shan's biography in Sanguozhi only mentioned that the assassination took place in that month, without indicating the specific date.) Jiange County, Sichuan
- Resting place: Zhaohua District, Guangyuan, Sichuan
- Relations: Fei Boren (relative); Fei Guan (relative)
- Children: Fei Cheng; Fei Gong; Liu Xuan's wife
- Occupation: Diplomat, military general, politician, regent
- Courtesy name: Wenwei (文偉)
- Posthumous name: Marquis Jing (敬侯)
- Peerage: Marquis of Cheng District (成鄉侯)

Fei Yi (died 16 February 253), courtesy name Wenwei, was a Chinese diplomat, military general, politician, and regent of the state of Shu during the Three Kingdoms period of China. Born in the late Eastern Han dynasty, Fei Yi started his career as an attendant to Liu Shan, the eldest son and heir apparent of Liu Bei, a warlord who became the founding emperor of Shu. After Liu Shan became emperor in 223, Fei Yi gradually rose to prominence under the regency of Zhuge Liang, the Imperial Chancellor of Shu. During this time, he concurrently served as a military adviser under Zhuge Liang and as Shu's ambassador to its ally state Wu. He also played a significant role in the conflict between the Shu general Wei Yan and Zhuge Liang's chief clerk Yang Yi. After Zhuge Liang's death in 234, Fei Yi served as a deputy to the new regent Jiang Wan and progressively assumed greater responsibilities as Jiang Wan gradually relinquished his powers due to poor health. In 244, Fei Yi led Shu forces to victory at the Battle of Xingshi against their rival state Wei and succeeded Jiang Wan as regent of Shu two years later following the latter's death. On the first day of the Chinese New Year in 253, Fei Yi was assassinated by a Wei defector, Guo Xiu.

== Early life ==
Fei Yi was born in Meng County (鄳縣), Jiangxia Commandery (江夏郡), which is located northwest of present-day Luoshan County, Henan, during the late Eastern Han dynasty. His father died when he was still young so he was raised by an older relative Fei Boren (費伯仁), whose aunt was the mother of Liu Zhang, (Note: Fei Guan, another member of the Fei (費) clan with the same family ties as Fei Boren is mentioned in the Ji Han Fuchen Zan (季漢輔臣贊; pub. 241), a collection of praises of notable persons who served in the Shu Han state.) the Governor of Yi Province (covering present-day Sichuan and Chongqing). When Liu Zhang invited Fei Boren to join him, Fei Yi accompanied Fei Boren as a travelling student and entered Yi Province.

In 214, after the warlord Liu Bei seized control of Yi Province from Liu Zhang and became the new Governor, Fei Yi chose to remain in Yi Province. During this time, he became as equally famous as two other notable scholars: Xu Shulong (許叔龍) from Runan Commandery (Note: Xu Shulong (許叔龍) was probably from the Xu clan of Runan (汝南許氏), whose members included Xu Jing and Xu Shao.) and Dong Yun from Nan Commandery.

=== Anecdote at the funeral of Xu Jing's son ===
When Xu Jing's son died, Fei Yi and Dong Yun wanted to attend the funeral so Dong Yun asked his father Dong He to help them arrange their transport. After Dong He provided them a small chariot with no rear covering, Dong Yun seemed reluctant to board it while Fei Yi eagerly got on board. When they reached their destination, they saw that Zhuge Liang and other key officials had shown up in well-decorated carriages. As they dismounted the carriage, Dong Yun showed signs of embarrassment while Fei Yi appeared calm and composed.

After they returned, Dong He asked the chariot driver and learnt that Dong Yun and Fei Yi reacted differently when they saw that their transport was of inferior design compared to others'. Dong He then told his son: "I always wondered how you and Wenwei compare with each other. Now I have the answer to my question."

== Service under Liu Bei ==
In 221, after Liu Bei declared himself emperor and established the state of Shu, he designated his eldest son Liu Shan as crown prince and appointed Fei Yi and Dong Yun to serve as the newly anointed heir apparent's close attendants.

== Service during Zhuge Liang's regency ==
When Liu Shan became the Shu emperor in 223 following Liu Bei's death, Zhuge Liang, the Imperial Chancellor, served as regent because Liu Shan was still underage at the time. After his coronation, Liu Shan appointed Fei Yi as a Gentleman of the Yellow Gate (黃門侍郎).

Around the autumn of 225, when Zhuge Liang returned from a military campaign against rebels and the Nanman tribes in southern Shu, Fei Yi and many of his colleagues travelled tens of li out of the capital Chengdu to welcome him back. Most of the officials were around the same age as Fei Yi and their ranks in the Shu government were about the same as his. Among all of them, Zhuge Liang chose only Fei Yi to ride in the same carriage as him for their journey back to Chengdu. The others felt very surprised and they changed their opinions of Fei Yi after this.

=== As Shu's ambassador to Wu ===
In 223, Shu reestablished its alliance with its former ally state Wu against their common rival state Wei. After Zhuge Liang returned from his southern campaign in 225, he commissioned Fei Yi as a Colonel of Illustrious Trust (昭信校尉) and sent him as Shu's ambassador to Wu.

During his mission to Wu, Fei Yi kept his cool when the Wu emperor Sun Quan tried to ridicule and poke fun at him. Sun Quan treated Fei Yi to alcoholic drinks, saw that he appeared drunk, and then bombarded him with a series of questions about current affairs. Fei Yi gave an excuse that he was no longer sober and declined to answer immediately. He noted down all the questions, went back and thought through carefully, and came back to Sun Quan later with all the answers without missing out any question. Some Wu officials such as Zhuge Ke and Yang Dao (羊衜), who were known for their oratorical talents, attempted to challenge Fei Yi and pose difficult questions to him. However, Fei Yi managed to respond in a calm and dignified manner, and provide well-reasoned answers to their questions. He held his ground well throughout his mission.

In one instance, a drunk Sun Quan asked Fei Yi: "Yang Yi and Wei Yan behave like immature boys. Even though their contributions are insignificant, they can still cause big trouble because they are in positions of power. If one day Zhuge Liang is no longer around, there will definitely be disaster. All of you are confused. No one has considered the long-term implications of this problem. Isn't that harmful to your descendants?" Fei Yi, stunned by Sun Quan's question, could not respond immediately and started glancing around as he tried to think of an answer. Fei Yi's deputy, Dong Hui, stepped up, looked at Fei Yi and said: "You can say that the conflict between Yang Yi and Wei Yan is a private issue between them. They don't have wild ambitions unlike Ying Bu and Han Xin. As of now, our priority is to eliminate our powerful enemy and reunify the Empire. Only after we have achieved that can we consider our mission accomplished and be able to expand our legacy. If we put our priority aside and focus on preempting internal problems such as this, it would be equivalent to not building a boat at all to avoid getting caught in a storm. That wouldn't be beneficial at all in the longer term." Sun Quan was very amused by Dong Hui's reply.

In another instance, Sun Quan instructed his officials: "When the Shu ambassador arrives, all of you just remain seated, continue eating, and don't stand up to greet him." When Fei Yi arrived, Sun Quan and his officials deliberately ignored his presence and continued feasting. Fei Yi then said: "When a fenghuang shows up, the qilin will stop eating (and acknowledge the fenghuang's presence). Donkeys and mules are ignorant. That's why they continue eating (and ignore the fenghuang)." Zhuge Ke replied: "We planted parasol trees for the fenghuang's arrival. A brambling came along instead. Why don't we scare away the brambling and force it to go back to where it came from?" Fei Yi stopped chewing on the pastry and asked for a brush to compose a rhapsody. Zhuge Ke also did the same. They then exchanged their works and praised each other.

Sun Quan was so impressed with Fei Yi that he told him: "Sir, you are one of the most virtuous men in the Empire. You will definitely become an important pillar of state in Shu. By then, I am afraid you will no longer be able to visit us often." Sun Quan also gave Fei Yi a precious sword, which he used to carry with him all the time, as a parting gift. Fei Yi told him: "I am untalented. What makes me deserve such an honour? A sword is meant to be used against enemies of the state and to put an end to chaos. I hope that you, Great King, will do your best to rule your kingdom and work together (with Shu) to support the Han dynasty. I may be ignorant and weak, but I will never disappoint the hopes you have placed in me."

=== As a military adviser ===
Fei Yi was promoted to the position of a Palace Attendant after returning from his diplomatic mission to Wu.

In 227, Zhuge Liang mobilised military forces from throughout Shu in preparation for a large-scale campaign against Shu's rival state Wei in the following year. As the troops gathered at the staging area in Hanzhong Commandery, Zhuge Liang summoned Fei Yi from Chengdu and appointed him as an Army Adviser (參軍). In his Chu Shi Biao (literally "memorial on the case to go to war"), Zhuge Liang named Fei Yi, Guo Youzhi and Dong Yun as examples of trustworthy, loyal and competent officials who could provide good advice and assist the emperor Liu Shan in governing Shu more effectively.

Between 227 and 230, Fei Yi alternated between his roles as a military adviser and Shu's ambassador to Wu. Apart from serving as an assistant to Zhuge Liang during the military campaigns against Wei, he was also often sent by the Shu government on diplomatic missions to Wu during this period of time. In 230, he was reassigned to serve as Central Protector of the Army (中護軍) and then as a Major (司馬) in the Shu army.

=== Role in the conflict between Wei Yan and Yang Yi ===
Wei Yan, a senior Shu general, was on bad terms with Yang Yi, Zhuge Liang's chief clerk. Wei Yan was known for being boastful, and his colleagues generally gave in to him. Yang Yi was one of the few who made no concession to Wei Yan, so Wei Yan deeply resented him. Zhuge Liang was upset by the lack of harmony between Wei Yan and Yang Yi, but he was unwilling to take sides because he appreciated the talents of both men and needed their help.

When Wei Yan and Yang Yi got into heated quarrels, the former drew his sword and brandished it in front of the latter. Yang Yi sobbed as tears rolled down his cheeks. Fei Yi then stepped in to stop them from fighting and managed to keep them under control while Zhuge Liang was still alive.

==== Battle of Wuzhang Plains ====
In 234, Zhuge Liang became critically ill during a stalemate at the Battle of Wuzhang Plains against Wei forces. During this time, when Li Fu asked Zhuge Liang who could succeed him as the head of the Shu government, Zhuge Liang replied that Jiang Wan could succeed him and that Fei Yi could succeed Jiang Wan. After Li Fu left, Zhuge Liang secretly instructed Yang Yi, Fei Yi and Jiang Wei to lead the army back to Shu after his death, with Wei Yan and Jiang Wei in charge of the rearguard. If Wei Yan refused to follow orders, they were to retreat without him. After Zhuge Liang died, Yang Yi ordered news of his death to be kept secret, and then instructed Fei Yi to meet Wei Yan and assess his intentions.

When Wei Yan refused to follow Zhuge Liang's final orders and submit to Yang Yi's command, Fei Yi pretended to help Wei Yan make new arrangements for part of the Shu army to remain behind and continue with the campaign, while the rest would return to Shu. Fei Yi then wrote a letter about the new arrangements, got both of them to sign it, and told Wei Yan that he would read out the letter to all the officers later. He also told Wei Yan: "I will go back and explain your point of view to Chief Clerk Yang. The Chief Clerk is a civil official who knows little about military affairs. He will definitely not oppose the new arrangements."

Fei Yi then left Wei Yan and sped back to the main camp. Wei Yan soon regretted his decision and tried to stop Fei Yi but could not catch up with him in time. After sending his subordinate to find out the situation in the main camp, he was shocked to learn that Fei Yi had lied to him because all the Shu units were preparing to retreat in accordance with Zhuge Liang's final orders. Wei Yan turned furious as he wanted to continue the battle, so he tried to stop the Shu army from retreating by leading his own unit to destroy the gallery roads leading back to Shu.

Wei Yan and Yang Yi separately wrote to the Shu government to accuse each other of treason; the Shu government believed Yang Yi's account and suspected that Wei Yan was plotting a rebellion. Wei Yan eventually met his end at the hands of the Shu general Ma Dai, and the conflict came to an end.

==== Reporting Yang Yi ====
After returning to Chengdu, Yang Yi thought that he had made great contributions so he strongly believed that he would be chosen to succeed Zhuge Liang as the new head of the Shu government. However, he felt deeply disappointed when it turned out that Zhuge Liang had picked Jiang Wan instead. Jiang Wan was appointed as the Prefect of the Masters of Writing (尚書令), while Yang Yi became a Central Military Adviser (中軍師) – an appointment with no real power.

Yang Yi had all along viewed himself highly and saw himself as superior to Jiang Wan because he started serving in Shu earlier than the latter. After Jiang Wan became the new head of the Shu government, Yang Yi frequently grumbled and complained to express his dissatisfaction. His colleagues ignored him due to his poor choice of words in conveying his frustration. Fei Yi was the only one who comforted him.

Yang Yi once told Fei Yi: "When the Imperial Chancellor died, I should have brought along my men and defected to Wei if I knew I'd end up in this situation today! I deeply regret but there's nothing I can do now." Fei Yi secretly reported Yang Yi to the Shu government. As a result, in 235 Yang Yi was demoted to the status of a commoner and exiled to Hanjia Commandery (漢嘉郡; around present-day Lushan County, Sichuan), where he committed suicide later. However, Yang's family could return to Shu.

== Service during Jiang Wan's regency ==
=== As Prefect of the Masters of Writing ===
Fei Yi rose to the position of Rear Military Adviser (後軍師) following Zhuge Liang's death in 234. He soon succeeded Jiang Wan as Prefect of the Masters of Writing (尚書令) in May 235.

At the time, as Shu was in a state of war, Fei Yi had numerous issues to attend to on a daily basis given his role as Prefect of the Masters of Writing. However, he was known for his exceptionally high level of intellect, fast speed of processing information, and excellent memory. He could grasp all the key points in a document and remember them after skimming through the document only once. Therefore, on a typical day at work, he usually completed all his tasks in the morning and spent the afternoon meeting people and engaging in leisure activities. He was particularly skilful at playing weiqi. Despite his indulgences in fun and entertainment, he never neglected his work and duties.

=== As General-in-Chief and Manager of the Affairs of the Masters of Writing ===
In late October or November 243, Jiang Wan moved from Hanzhong Commandery to Fu County (涪縣; present-day Mianyang, Sichuan) due to poor health. In late November or December that year, Jiang Wan relinquished his positions as General-in-Chief (大將軍) and Manager of the Affairs of the Masters of Writing (錄尚書事) to Fei Yi, thus making Fei Yi the de facto head of the Shu government.

In 244, Dong Yun succeeded Fei Yi as Prefect of the Masters of Writing (尚書令) and attempted to follow Fei Yi's daily schedule and lifestyle when he held that appointment. However, within ten days, Dong Yun quickly realised that his work was gradually piling up. He sighed: "The ability of a talented person can be so significantly different from that of another. I think I can never catch up (with Fei Yi). Despite working all day long, I still have many things that I haven't attended to yet."

=== Battle of Xingshi ===
In early 244, the Wei regent Cao Shuang led an army to Mount Xingshi (興勢山; located north of present-day Yang County, Shaanxi) and prepared to attack the Shu-controlled Hanzhong Commandery. In late April or May, the Shu emperor Liu Shan granted Fei Yi acting imperial authority and ordered him to lead the Shu army into battle against the invaders.

Before Fei Yi departed, the Shu official Lai Min visited him and asked to play a game of weiqi with him. At the time, all the preparations for battle had been made and the troops were ready to march off. While documents attached with feathers (Note: In ancient China, feathers were often attached to urgent military documents to emphasise the urgency of the situation.) kept coming in, Fei Yi continued playing with Lai Min and seemed deeply engrossed in the game. Lai Min told him: "I was actually testing you! You are a trustworthy person and you will definitely be able to defeat the enemy."

By June 244, the Wei army had become stuck in a perilous situation as they could not advance beyond Mount Xingshi and their supplies were running low. Sensing that defeat was imminent, Cao Shuang's adviser Yang Wei (楊偉) tried to persuade his superior to pull back the Wei army before it was too late. However, Cao Shuang listened to Deng Yang and Li Sheng instead and ordered his troops to hold their positions. After Cao Shuang's co-regent Sima Yi wrote to Cao Shuang's deputy Xiahou Xuan and warned him of the danger they were in, Xiahou Xuan became fearful and managed to convince Cao Shuang to retreat. In late June or July, while the Wei army was retreating, Fei Yi led the Shu forces to launch a three-pronged attack and inflicted a devastating defeat on the enemy with Cao Shuang barely escaping alive.

=== As the Inspector of Yi Province ===
After Fei Yi returned to Chengdu from his victory at Mount Xingshi, he was enfeoffed as the Marquis of Cheng District (成鄉侯) as a reward for his achievement.

Towards the end of 244, as Jiang Wan's health deteriorated, he stepped down from his gubernatorial appointment as the Inspector of Yi Province (益州刺史) and passed it on to Fei Yi.

== Fei Yi's regency ==
Following Jiang Wan's death in November or December 246, Fei Yi became the new regent and head of the Shu government. By the time he came to power, his contributions to Shu and personal fame were on par with his predecessor.

In 248, Fei Yi moved from the Shu capital Chengdu to Hanzhong Commandery near the Wei–Shu border. Throughout their regencies, Jiang Wan and Fei Yi still maintained control over state affairs in Chengdu even though they were away in Hanzhong for extended periods of time. For example, the Shu emperor Liu Shan had to consult them and gain their approval before giving out rewards and punishments to officials. Such was Liu Shan's high levels of trust in and reliance on these two regents during his reign.

In the summer of 251, when Fei Yi returned to Chengdu, he heard from fortune-tellers that it was inauspicious for him to remain in the capital, so in winter he moved out of Chengdu to Hanshou County (漢壽縣; northeast of present-day Jiange County, Sichuan).

In 252, Liu Shan granted Fei Yi permission to have a personal staff to assist him in running the day-to-day affairs.

=== Assassination ===
On 16 February 253, while hosting a party on the first day of the Chinese New Year in Hanshou County (漢壽縣; northeast of present-day Jiange County, Sichuan), a drunk Fei Yi was stabbed and killed by Guo Xiu (郭脩; also known as Guo Xun 郭循), a former Wei civilian who became a general in Shu. The assassin also met his end at the hands of Fei Yi's subordinates. He was honoured with the posthumous title "Marquis Jing" (敬侯; literally "respectful marquis") and buried at a location about 1 kilometre east from the eastern gate of the present-day Zhaohua Ancient City in Zhaohua District, Guangyuan, Sichuan.

Guo Xiu, whose courtesy name was Xiaoxian (孝先), was quite well known in Liang Province before he joined Shu. After he was captured in battle by the Shu general Jiang Wei, he reluctantly surrendered and pledged allegiance to Shu. The Shu emperor Liu Shan appointed him as General of the Left (左將軍). Guo Xiu once attempted to assassinate Liu Shan under the pretext of congratulating the emperor. However, Liu Shan's bodyguards noticed something suspicious about his behaviour and stopped him before he could get close to the emperor. Frustrated at his failure to assassinate the Shu emperor, Guo Xiu switched his target to the regent Fei Yi instead and succeeded. In September or October 253, the Wei emperor Cao Fang issued an imperial decree to praise Guo Xiu for his "heroic service to Wei" and compare him to Nie Zheng and Jie Zhitui, as well as to confer posthumous honours on him and grant rewards to his family.

The fifth-century historian Pei Songzhi rebutted Cao Fang's imperial decree and argued that Guo Xiu was not a hero and his assassination of Fei Yi was not "in the service of Wei". He pointed out three reasons. First, Guo Xiu was a civilian when he was captured by the enemy so he was not exactly "serving" Wei and hence his assassination of Fei Yi should not be considered an action "in the service of Wei". Second, Wei was not threatened by Shu in the same way Yan was threatened by Qin during the late Warring States period, therefore Guo Xiu's assassination of Fei Yi should not be seen in the same light as Jing Ke's assassination attempt on the King of Qin. Third, from Pei Songzhi's point of view, Liu Shan and Fei Yi were respectively a ruler and a regent of average calibre, so their deaths would not deal significant damage to Shu. Pei Songzhi thus concluded that Guo Xiu was simply an opportunist seeking to become (in)famous by assassinating the regent of a state.

== Argument about the conflict between Sima Yi and Cao Shuang ==
Following Sima Yi's execution of Cao Shuang, Fei Yi defended his position on the matter in a rhetoric manner. First, he offered the common view about the affair, followed by his counter argument of the event along with his judgement on who was morally in the right and in the wrong.

“Let's say that someone believes that Cao Shuang, along with his brothers, were of the mediocre and common sort. That their positions, privilege and benefits were only due to their relation to the Imperial Clan. Moreover, with time they became excessive and arrogant, would usurp royal prerogatives, had close ties with vile persons, monopolize power by establishing those of their clique and plotted against the interest of the State. Then, Sima Yi took a risk to punish them and in one strike, they were exterminated. That this act is proof enough that he was worthy of his appointment and realized the desire of the scholars and commoners alike."

“However, someone else may believe that Sima Yi resented Cao Rui for not entrusting all of the State's affairs to him solely. Therefore, Cao Shuang and his actions were irrelevant to Sima's decision. Since the management of the State was already divided, as time passed, this arrangement became even more flawed. From the start, Sima did not give honest counsel and loyal admonishment. Rather, he used the opportunity to have all of them slaughtered at once when they were unprepared. In that case, how could it be considered as a great man acting in consideration of the State or doing his duty? If indeed Cao Shuang really wanted to act against his ruler and had desire to rebel, then on the day Sima Yi acted, Cao Fang was left alone and vulnerable with Cao Shuang and his brothers. However, Sima Yi with his son Sima Shi from the rear, closed the city gates and raised troops, putting Cao Fang in danger and proclaiming there would be no peace talk. Can we consider a person acting as such a loyal minister with the intention of saving his lord? If we follow this view then the fact that Cao Shuang did not commit a great fault should be obvious. Now if Sima Yi acted because Cao Shuang usurped power and was extravagant, then a fair punishment would have been to remove him from office. However, Sima Yi exterminated all of Cao Shuang's clan and this was an injustice, ending Cao Zhen's bloodline. Even He Yan along with his son who were relatives of the Wei imperial line were also executed. This was an usurpation of power and Sima Yi's actions were excessive and improper."

== Family ==
Fei Yi had at least two sons and one daughter. His first son, Fei Cheng (費承), inherited his peerage as the Marquis of Cheng District (成鄉侯) and served as a Gentleman of the Yellow Gate (黃門侍郎) in the Shu imperial palace. Fei Yi's second son, Fei Gong (費恭), married a Shu princess (probably one of Liu Shan's daughters), had quite a huge reputation, and served as an official in Shu's imperial secretariat. However, he died at a relatively young age but must have lived at least until April 268 since Luo Xian recommended him during a feast to Sima Yan as a talented individual. Fei Yi's daughter married Liu Xuan, the eldest son and heir apparent of Liu Shan.

== Appraisal ==
Chen Shou, the third-century historian who wrote Fei Yi's biography in the Sanguozhi, praised Fei Yi for being compassionate, generous and charitable towards others. He gave credit to Fei Yi and Jiang Wan for following in Zhuge Liang's footsteps and pointed out that in doing so they managed to secure Shu's borders and maintain peace and harmony within Shu. However, he also criticised them for not putting in their best to govern a small state like Shu and keeping it safe.

The fifth-century historian Pei Songzhi, who annotated the Sanguozhi, disagreed with Chen Shou's point of view. He argued that Fei Yi and Jiang Wan did well during their regencies when they refrained from making risky moves that could jeopardise Shu's future and when they successfully countered a Wei invasion and maintained peace within Shu's borders. He also pointed out that readers may find Chen Shou's concluding remarks confusing because Chen Shou did not provide any evidence to support his claim that Fei Yi and Jiang Wan did not put in their best to govern Shu and keep it safe.

Despite being in a position of power and prestige, Fei Yi remained humble and always showed respect towards others. He had no excess wealth for himself and his family. His sons lived like commoners as they wore clothes of plain design, had simple meals, travelled on foot, and had no escorts to accompany them when they travelled.

The Shu general Zhang Ni had noted that Fei Yi tended to be too good-natured and overly trusting of the people around him. He once warned Fei Yi: "In the past, Cen Peng commanded troops and Lai Xi wielded the staff of imperial authority; both of them were assassinated. In the present-day, you, General, occupy a position of great importance and power so you should learn from these historical examples and be more vigilant." As Zhang Ni foresaw, Fei Yi indeed met his end at the hands of the assassin Guo Xiu.

The fourth-century historian Yu Xi commented in his Zhilin (志林) that it was a tragic irony that Fei Yi's positive attributes brought about his downfall: Fei Yi, being too open and generous, lowered his guard against people around him and failed to save himself from Guo Xiu, a defector from a rival state.

Chang Qu, who wrote extensively about the history of the Sichuan region in the Chronicles of Huayang (Huayang Guo Zhi), praised Jiang Wan and Fei Yi for perpetuating Zhuge Liang's principles. Furthermore, for keeping the land of Shu Han safe while they were encircled by two bigger states rendering the weak as strong. He also recorded that the people of Shu named Zhuge Liang, Jiang Wan, Fei Yi and Dong Yun as the four heroic chancellors of their state.

== See also ==
- Lists of people of the Three Kingdoms
