= Battle of Wuzhang Plains =

Military conflict between Cao Wei and Shu Han (234)

- Part of the fifth of Zhuge Liang's Northern Expeditions
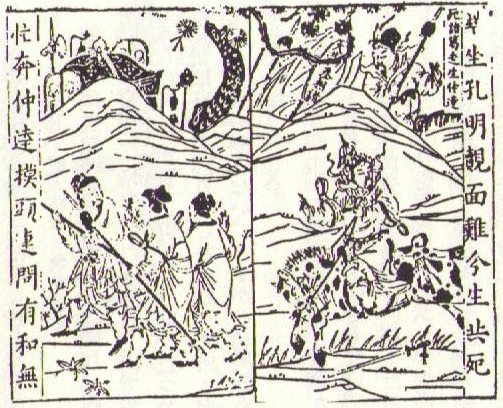
- An illustration from a Qing dynasty edition of the historical novel Romance of the Three Kingdoms depicting a statue of Zhuge Liang scaring away Sima Yi
Date	c. March – October 234
Location	Wuzhang Plains, Shaanxi, China 34°21′00″N 107°23′00″E
Result	Inconclusive; Shu Han retreat

Belligerents
Cao Wei	Shu Han

Commanders and leaders
Sima Yi; Qin Lang; Guo Huai	Zhuge Liang # Jiang Wei; Yang Yi; Fei Yi; Wei Yan (executed); Wang Ping; Zhang Yi; Liao Hua; Ma Dai

Strength
Unknown	60,000

Casualties and losses
Unknown	Unknown
- Location within China

Battle of Wuzhang Plains
- Traditional Chinese: 五丈原之戰
- Simplified Chinese: 五丈原之战
Transcriptions
Standard Mandarin
- Hanyu Pinyin: Wǔzhàng Yuán Zhī Zhàn

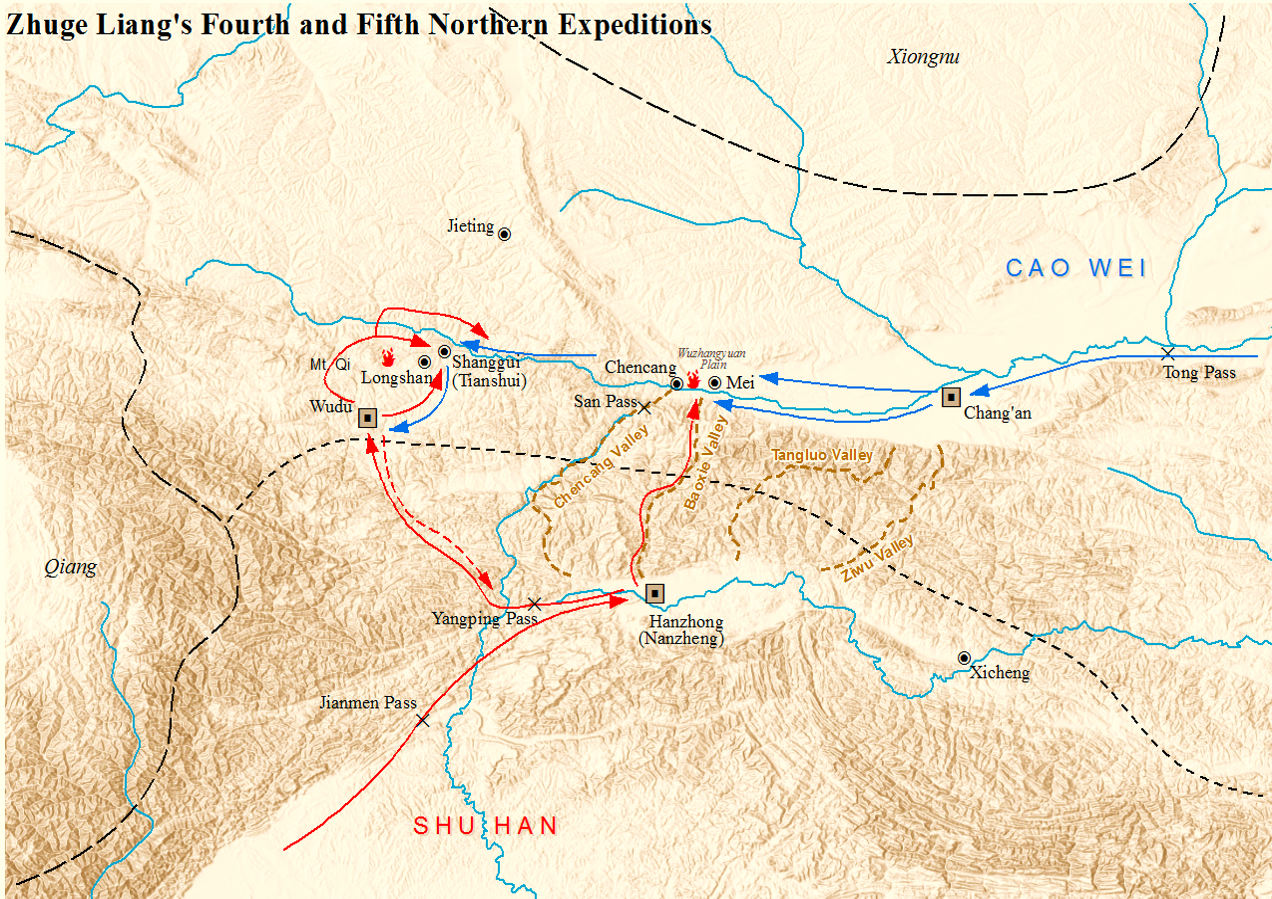
Zhuge Liang's fourth and fifth northern expeditions against Cao Wei

The Battle of Wuzhang Plains was fought between the contending states of Cao Wei and Shu Han in 234 AD during the Three Kingdoms period of China. The battle was the fifth and last of a series of Northern Expeditions led by Shu's chancellor, Zhuge Liang, to attack Wei. Zhuge Liang fell ill and died during the stalemate and subsequently the Shu forces retreated.

== Background ==
In the spring of 234, Zhuge Liang led more than 60,000 Shu troops out of Xie Valley (斜谷) and camped on the southern bank of the Wei River near Mei County (郿縣; southeast of present-day Fufeng County, Shaanxi). He constantly worried about a shortage of food for the army, because the supply line was overly extended and supplies did not always reach the front line in time. He then implemented the tuntian policy to create a new source of food supply, by ordering his troops to grow crops on the south bank of the Wei River alongside the civilians living in the area. He also forbade his troops from taking the civilians' crops.

The Wei emperor Cao Rui became worried and sent General Qin Lang with 20,000 infantry and cavalry to the Guanzhong region to join Sima Yi, the Grand Chief Controller (大都督) of the Wei military forces in the region. Sima Yi's subordinates wanted to make camp north of the Wei River and wait, but Sima Yi said, "Many civilians have gathered at the south of the Wei River. That will definitely become a hotly contested location." Sima Yi then led his army across the river and set up their camp with the Wei River behind them. He said, "If Zhuge Liang is brave enough, he'll move out from Wugong County (武功縣; east of present-day Mei County, Shaanxi) and head eastward in the direction of the mountains. If he moves west to the Wuzhang Plains, we'll have no worries."

== Battle ==
=== Initial clashes ===
When Zhuge Liang arrived at the Wei River, at his command, the advance team led by Meng Yan crossed the river and camped at the eastern foot of the Wugong River. Sima Yi led 10,000 cavalry to attack the advance team. Zhuge Liang made a bridge out of bamboo and ordered his soldiers to fire their crossbows at the cavalry. Sima Yi saw the completed bridge and immediately retreated.

When Sima Yi and his troops were stationed to the south of the Wei River, Guo Huai urged them to move to the plains on the north bank of the river as he foresaw that Zhuge Liang would attempt to seize the plains. When the other officers disagreed, Guo Huai said, "If Zhuge Liang crosses the Wei River and occupies those plains, his troops will have access to the mountains in the north. If they block the road through the mountains, it will cause fear and panic among the people living in the region. This isn't helpful to our State." Sima Yi agreed with Guo Huai and sent him to occupy the plains. While Guo Huai and his men were building a camp on the plains, they came under attack by Shu forces but managed to drive them back.

Zhuge Liang moved towards the Wuzhang Plains and prepared to cross to the north side of the Wei River. Sima Yi sent Zhou Dang (周當) into position at Yangsui (陽遂; the area north of the Wei River in present-day Mei and Fufeng counties, Shaanxi) and to lure Zhuge Liang to attack him. Zhuge Liang did not mobilise his troops for several days. Sima Yi said, "Zhuge Liang wants to take control of the Wuzhang Plains and won't advance towards Yangsui. His intention is obvious." He then sent Hu Zun (胡遵) and Guo Huai to defend Yangsui. Several days later, when Guo Huai received news that Zhuge Liang was planning to launch an attack in the west, his subordinates wanted to strengthen the defences in that area. Guo Huai was the only one who recognised that it was a ruse, and that Zhuge Liang was actually planning to attack Yangsui. He was proven right later when the Shu forces attacked Yangsui at night. However, as Guo Huai had set up defences earlier, the Shu forces failed to capture Yangsui. Zhuge Liang could not advance further so he retreated to the Wuzhang Plains.

One night, Sima Yi saw a star falling towards the Shu camp and predicted that Zhuge Liang would be defeated. He ordered a surprise attack on the rear of the Shu camp: 500 Shu soldiers were killed, 600 surrendered, and more than 1,000 livestock of the Shu army were captured by Wei forces. But these figures from the Book of Jin were disputed by historians, and are not included in the definitive 11th-century chronological historical text Zizhi Tongjian. Instead, the record for Records of the Three Kingdoms, which differs from the record for Book of Jin, was included in Zizhi Tongjian.

=== Stalemate ===
Around this time, the Wei government observed that, since the Shu army was far away from its base at Hanzhong Commandery, it would not be in its interest to fight a prolonged war in Wei territory. Zhuge Liang was worried that he could not impose his will due to the lack of reliable supplies, so he divided the army and laid the foundation for a long-term presence. Farming troops were mixed with the people along the Wei River, but the people were comfortable and the army had no conflicting interest. Meanwhile, Wei emperor Cao Rui ordered Sima Yi to refrain from engaging the enemy and to wait for opportunities to strike. Zhuge Liang attempted to lure Sima Yi into battle but Sima Yi followed Cao Rui's orders and remained in camp. Zhuge Liang understood that Sima Yi was trying to wear them down through attrition warfare, so he continued the tuntian system to sustain the Shu army.

One day, Zhuge Liang sent a woman's ornaments to Sima Yi to taunt him to come out and fight. Sima Yi felt enraged and wanted to attack Zhuge Liang, but Cao Rui denied him permission and ordered him to remain in camp. Cao Rui even gave Xin Pi his imperial sceptre (a symbol of the emperor's authority) and sent him to the Wuzhang Plains to keep an eye on Sima Yi. When Zhuge Liang taunted him again, Sima Yi wanted to attack the enemy, but Xin Pi used the authority of the imperial sceptre to order him to remain in camp.

When the Shu general Jiang Wei heard that Xin Pi was in Sima Yi's camp, he told Zhuge Liang, "Xin Pi has come with the imperial sceptre. The enemy won't come out of their camp (to attack us)." Zhuge Liang replied, "Sima Yi doesn't want to engage us in battle in the first place. His true intention in seeking permission from his emperor to attack us is, in fact, to show his troops that he is eager to fight and to keep them battle-ready. A general away on the battlefield doesn't necessarily need to follow his lord's orders. If (Sima Yi) can defeat us, why does he still need to ask for permission from his emperor, who is thousands of li away (from here)?"

When Sima Fu wrote to Sima Yi to ask about the situation at the Wuzhang Plains, Sima Yi replied: "Zhuge Liang has big ambitions but he fails to recognise opportunities. He has his wits about him but is not decisive. He likes leading troops into battle even though he does not have much authority over them. Even though he has 100,000 troops under his command, he has already fallen into my trap and I'll certainly defeat him."

During the stalemate, Sima Yi asked a messenger who Zhuge Liang sent to meet him: "What are Zhuge Liang's living conditions like? How much grain does he consume (a day)?" The messenger replied, "Three to four sheng." Sima Yi then asked about Zhuge Liang's daily routine, to which the messenger replied that Zhuge Liang micromanaged almost everything, except trivial issues like punishments for minor offences. He remarked, "How can Zhuge Kongming last long? He's going to die soon."

Meanwhile, Sima Yi also provoked Zhuge Liang. Sima Yi ordered some 2,000 people to cheer from the southeast corner of the compound. When Zhuge Liang sent a man to find out what the cheering was about, the scout reported, "Eastern Wu's envoy came and said he would surrender." Zhuge Liang said, "Eastern Wu will not surrender. Sima Yi is an old man who will soon be 60 years old; does he need to use this trick?"

=== Zhuge Liang's death and the Shu retreat ===
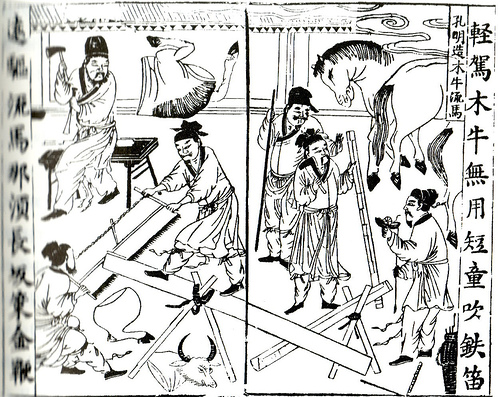
An illustration from a Qing dynasty edition of the historical novel Romance of the Three Kingdoms showing the wooden oxen and flowing horses (木牛流馬) used by the Shu army to transport supplies.

Sometime between 11 September and 10 October 234, (Note: The Sanguozhi recorded that Zhuge Liang fell sick and died in the 8th lunar month of the 12th year of the Jianxing era in Liu Shan's reign. This month corresponds to 11 September to 10 October 234 in the Gregorian calendar.) Zhuge Liang became critically ill and his condition worsened daily. When the Shu emperor Liu Shan heard about it, he sent Li Fu (李福) to the Wuzhang Plains to ask Zhuge Liang about succession. Zhuge Liang replied that Jiang Wan could succeed him and that Fei Yi in turn could succeed Jiang Wan. When Li Fu asked again about Fei Yi's successor, Zhuge Liang did not respond. Li Fu then returned to the Shu capital, Chengdu. Before his death, Zhuge Liang gave secret orders to Yang Yi, Fei Yi, and Jiang Wei to lead the Shu army on a retreat back to Shu after his death, with Wei Yan in charge of the rearguard and Jiang Wei to follow behind. If Wei Yan refused to follow the order, they were to retreat without him. When Zhuge Liang died, news of his death was kept secret.

After a standoff lasting more than 100 days, Sima Yi heard from civilians that Zhuge Liang had died from illness and that the Shu army had burnt their camp and retreated. Sima Yi led the Wei forces in pursuit. Zhuge Liang's assistant, Yang Yi, ordered the Shu soldiers to beat their war drums and get into formation to resist the enemy. Sima Yi did not press on since he felt that the Shu army was already beaten; Yang Yi withdrew. According to folklore, Sima Yi retreated after he saw a wooden statue of Zhuge Liang and thought that Zhuge Liang was still alive. In some variations of this legend, it was Jiang Wei who disguised himself as Zhuge Liang to scare away Sima Yi.

Some days later, Sima Yi surveyed the remains of the Shu camp and retrieved maps, many documents and considerable food supplies. He concluded that Zhuge Liang was indeed dead and said, "He was a rare talent in this world." Xin Pi felt that they could not be certain about Zhuge Liang's death yet, but Sima Yi said, "The most important things for an army are its documents, troops, horses, and supplies. [Zhuge Liang] has abandoned all of them. How can a person lose his five most important organs and still be alive? We should quickly pursue [the enemy]." The ground in the Guanzhong region was full of devil's weed so Sima Yi sent 2,000 men wearing wooden clogs with flat soles to clear the path before his main army advanced. When Sima Yi reached Chi'an (赤岸), he confirmed that Zhuge Liang was dead. When he asked the civilians living there, they told him that there was a recent popular saying: "A dead Zhuge scares away a living Zhongda. (Note: "Zhongda" was Sima Yi's courtesy name.)" When Sima Yi heard that, he laughed and said, "I can predict the thoughts of the living but I can't predict the dead's."

== Aftermath ==
=== Conflict between Wei Yan and Yang Yi ===
The Shu general Wei Yan, dismayed that the Shu forces were retreating "over the death of one man", gathered his units and travelled back to Shu territory ahead of the main army led by Yang Yi, Fei Yi, Jiang Wei, and the others. During the retreat, Wei Yan ordered the gallery roads leading back to Shu to be burnt down.

Wei Yan and Yang Yi separately wrote dispatches to the Shu imperial court and accused each other of treason. Their memorials arrived in the Shu capital, Chengdu, on the same day. The Shu emperor Liu Shan asked the ministers Dong Yun and Jiang Wan for their opinions. Both of them sided with Yang Yi and felt that Wei Yan's actions were suspicious. In the meantime, Yang Yi ordered his men to cut down trees to rebuild the gallery roads, and his troops marched day and night to catch up with Wei Yan. Wei Yan arrived at the southern valley first and ordered his soldiers to attack Yang Yi. Yang Yi sent Wang Ping to resist Wei Yan. Wang Ping shouted at Wei Yan, "His lordship [Zhuge Liang] had just died and his body had yet to turn cold, and now you dare to do something like this!" Wei Yan's men knew that their commander was in the wrong and they deserted.

Wei Yan was left with only his son(s) and a few followers. They fled towards Hanzhong Commandery. Yang Yi ordered Ma Dai to give chase. Ma Dai caught up with Wei Yan, decapitated him, brought his head back, and threw it in front of Yang Yi. Yang Yi trampled on Wei Yan's head and said, "You inferior slave! Now, can you still commit evil?" Wei Yan's family members and close relatives were also executed. Before Wei Yan's death, Jiang Wan had led divisions of the imperial guards from Chengdu to deal with the conflict. They had travelled for about 10 li [about three miles] when they received news of Wei Yan's death; thus informed they returned to Chengdu.

=== Long-term influences ===
After Zhuge Liang's death, Jiang Wan took the chancellor's post, but Jiang was more interested in domestic affairs than military expansion. Thus the death of Zhuge Liang ended a huge strategic threat to Cao Wei and the Wei court soon began development of an ambitious program of public works.

Sima Yi's success and subsequent rise in prominence paved the way for his grandson Sima Yan's founding of the Jin dynasty, which would eventually bring an end to the Three Kingdoms period.

== In popular culture ==
The battle is featured as one of the final playable stages in Koei's video game series Dynasty Warriors. The earlier installments of the game changed the original account of the battle: certain characters such as Cao Cao and Liu Bei, who had historically died more than a decade before the battle, survived until then to participate in the battle. However, Dynasty Warriors 9 has made the battle more accurate than it was in the earlier installments.

== Bibliography ==
- Chen, Shou. Records of the Three Kingdoms (Sanguozhi).
- Fang, Xuanling. Book of Jin (Jin Shu).
- Killigrew, John. "Zhuge Liang and the Northern Campaign," Early Medieval China, 5 (1), 1999, 55-91
- Luo, Guanzhong. Romance of the Three Kingdoms (Sanguo Yanyi), chs. 103–104.
- Pei, Songzhi. Annotations to Records of the Three Kingdoms (Sanguozhi zhu).
- Sima, Guang. Zizhi Tongjian, vol. 72.
- Sawyer, Ralph (2010). Zhuge Liang: Strategy, Achievements, and Writings. CreateSpace Independent Publishing. ISBN 978-1492860020.
