= Dingyuan Township, Qu County =

Dingyuan Township 定远乡
- Township
- Location in Sichuan
- Coordinates: 30°48′16″N 106°47′12″E
- Country: People's Republic of China
- Province: Sichuan
- Prefecture-level city: Dazhou
- County: Qu County
- Time zone: UTC+8 (China Standard)

Dingyuan Township (simplified Chinese: 定远乡; traditional Chinese: 定遠鄉; pinyin: Dìngyuǎn Xiāng) is a township under the administration of Qu County in Sichuan, China. As of 2018, it has one residential community and seven villages under its administration.

== See also ==
- List of township-level divisions of Sichuan
