= Dingyuan Township, Zitong County =

Dingyuan Township 定远乡
- Township
- Location in Sichuan
- Coordinates: 31°30′32″N 105°15′15″E
- Country: People's Republic of China
- Province: Sichuan
- Prefecture-level city: Mianyang
- County: Zitong County
- Time zone: UTC+8 (China Standard)

Dingyuan Township (simplified Chinese: 定远乡; traditional Chinese: 定遠鄉; pinyin: Dìngyuǎn Xiāng) is a township under the administration of Zitong County in Sichuan, China. As of 2018, it has 10 villages under its administration.

== See also ==
- List of township-level divisions of Sichuan
