= Dingyuan Township, Henan =

Dingyuan Township 定远乡
- Township
- Location in Henan
- Coordinates: 31°47′52″N 114°30′19″E
- Country: People's Republic of China
- Province: Henan
- Prefecture-level city: Xinyang
- County: Luoshan County
- Time zone: UTC+8 (China Standard)

Dingyuan Township (simplified Chinese: 定远乡; traditional Chinese: 定遠鄉; pinyin: Dìngyuǎn Xiāng) is a township under the administration of Luoshan County in Henan, China. As of 2018, it has one residential community and 16 villages under its administration.
