= Dingyuan, Gansu =

Dingyuan 定远镇
- Town
- Location in Gansu
- Coordinates: 35°57′45″N 104°0′10″E
- Country: People's Republic of China
- Province: Gansu
- Prefecture-level city: Lanzhou
- County: Yuzhong
- Time zone: UTC+8 (China Standard)

Dingyuan (simplified Chinese: 定远; traditional Chinese: 定遠; pinyin: Dìngyuǎn) is a town of Yuzhong County in southeastern Gansu province, China. As of 2018, it has 12 villages under its administration.

== See also ==
- List of township-level divisions of Gansu
