= Luoshan County =

Luoshan County 罗山县 Loshan
- County
- Location of the seat in Henan
- Coordinates: 32°12′N 114°31′E
- Country: People's Republic of China
- Province: Henan
- Prefecture-level city: Xinyang

Area
  - Total: 2,065 km^{2} (797 sq mi)

Population (2019)
  - Total: 529,100
  - Density: 256.2/km^{2} (663.6/sq mi)
- Time zone: UTC+8 (China Standard)
- Postal code: 464200
- Website: www.luoshan.gov.cn

Luoshan County (simplified Chinese: 罗山; traditional Chinese: 羅山; pinyin: Luóshān; postal: Loshan) is a county in the southeast of Henan province, China, bordering Hubei province to the south. It is under the administration of Xinyang city. The primary dialect is the Xinyang city dialect of Southwestern Mandarin.

== Historical evolution ==
The Western Han dynasty began to set up Jixian County, belonging to Jiangxia County. The Wei and Jin dynasties use the Chinese system. The Southern Song dynasty is divided into the county of Baocheng County, which belongs to Yiyang County. Nanqi was changed to Baocheng as Baocheng, which belongs to Beiyiyang County. In the Northern Wei dynasty, Baocheng County, Qi County, and Dongsui County were placed. Baocheng County and Qi County belong to Qi'an County. North Qihe County is located in Gao'an County, still in Qi'an County.

In the third year of the Kaihuang Emperor (583 years), Gao'an County was merged into Zhongshan County. In the 16th year of Kaihuang (596), it was analyzed that Zhongshan County was located in Luoshan County and belonged to Yiyang County. Because of the southwest of the county, there is Xiaoluo Mountain, hence the name. Tang Wude four years (612 years) set South Luozhou, led Luoshan County. Wude eight years (625 years) South Luozhou waste, Luoshan County is Shenzhou. Five generations with the Tang system. Song Kaibao nine years (976 years) Luoshan County waste. In the third year of the reign of Emperor Xixi (986), it belonged to Xinyang Army.

In the 20th year of Yuanzhiyuan (1283), Xinyang Prefecture was reorganized in Luoshan County. The former Luoshan County moved to the southwest, and it was called Luoshan New County. It belonged to Xinyang Prefecture of Suining.

In the first year of Ming Hongwu (1368), the county was restored to the old, still known as Luoshan County, belonging to Xinyang Prefecture. In the 7th year of Hongwu (1374), it was changed to Suining. Chenghua Decade (1475) is a copy of Xinyang Prefecture. Luoshan in the Qing dynasty belonged to Suining.

In the 2nd year of the Republic of China (1913), the waste state was changed to the county, and Luoshan County belonged to Henan South Road, and later changed to Xiangyang Road. In the 16th year of the Republic of China (1927), it was abolished and directly under Henan Province. In 17 years (1928), Henan Province was divided into 14 administrative districts, and Luoshan was the seventh (Xinyang) Inspector Administrative Region. In the 21st year of the Republic of China (1932), it was assigned to the ninth (Huangchuan) administrative inspectorate of Henan Province. In the 22nd year of the Republic of China (1933), it was analyzed in the southern part of the county. It was newly established in Lishan County, Hubei Province, now Dawu County.

In March 1949, the Chinese People's Liberation Army occupied Luoshan, belonging to the Huangchuan area. In 1952, the Huangchuan area was merged into the Xinyang area, and Luoshan was merged. In 1998, Xinyang withdrew from the city, and Luoshan was the county.

== Administrative divisions ==
As of 2012, this county is divided to 9 towns and 10 townships.

Towns

- Chengguan (城关镇)
- Zhoudang (周党镇)
- Nangan (楠杆镇)
- Zhugan (竹竿镇)
- Qingshan (青山镇)
- Zilu (子路镇)
- Lingshan (灵山镇)
- Pengxin (彭新镇)
- Panxin (潘新镇)

Townships

- Longshan Township (龙山乡)
- Gaodian Township (高店乡)
- Youdian Township (尤店乡)
- Dongpu Township (东铺乡)
- Mangzhang Township (莽张乡)
- Miaoxian Township (庙仙乡)
- Zhutang Township (朱堂乡)
- Tiepu Township (铁铺乡)
- Shandian Township (山店乡)
- Dingyuan Township (定远乡)

== Climate ==
Climate data for Luoshan, elevation 55 m (180 ft), (1991–2020 normals, extremes 1981–present)
Month	Jan	Feb	Mar	Apr	May	Jun	Jul	Aug	Sep	Oct	Nov	Dec	Year
Record high °C (°F)	20.2 (68.4)	27.0 (80.6)	34.0 (93.2)	33.8 (92.8)	36.3 (97.3)	38.0 (100.4)	39.4 (102.9)	37.8 (100.0)	37.6 (99.7)	33.7 (92.7)	28.6 (83.5)	21.4 (70.5)	39.4 (102.9)
Mean daily maximum °C (°F)	6.9 (44.4)	10.3 (50.5)	15.6 (60.1)	22.1 (71.8)	26.9 (80.4)	29.8 (85.6)	31.8 (89.2)	30.9 (87.6)	27.3 (81.1)	22.4 (72.3)	15.7 (60.3)	9.3 (48.7)	20.8 (69.3)
Daily mean °C (°F)	2.4 (36.3)	5.3 (41.5)	10.4 (50.7)	16.6 (61.9)	21.7 (71.1)	25.5 (77.9)	27.7 (81.9)	26.7 (80.1)	22.3 (72.1)	17.0 (62.6)	10.5 (50.9)	4.6 (40.3)	15.9 (60.6)
Mean daily minimum °C (°F)	−1.0 (30.2)	1.6 (34.9)	6.2 (43.2)	11.8 (53.2)	17.2 (63.0)	21.7 (71.1)	24.4 (75.9)	23.4 (74.1)	18.6 (65.5)	12.8 (55.0)	6.5 (43.7)	1.0 (33.8)	12.0 (53.6)
Record low °C (°F)	−17.3 (0.9)	−11.9 (10.6)	−5.2 (22.6)	−0.1 (31.8)	6.9 (44.4)	12.8 (55.0)	17.7 (63.9)	14.1 (57.4)	10.1 (50.2)	2.4 (36.3)	−7.4 (18.7)	−14.7 (5.5)	−17.3 (0.9)
Average precipitation mm (inches)	33.6 (1.32)	39.0 (1.54)	61.6 (2.43)	71.5 (2.81)	113.8 (4.48)	146.3 (5.76)	174.6 (6.87)	130.5 (5.14)	71.3 (2.81)	64.6 (2.54)	47.6 (1.87)	23.8 (0.94)	978.2 (38.51)
Average precipitation days (≥ 0.1 mm)	7.0	8.1	8.9	8.9	10.6	9.8	11.3	11.4	9.3	8.9	8.0	6.0	108.2
Average snowy days	5.1	3.2	1.1	0	0	0	0	0	0	0	0.8	1.9	12.1
Average relative humidity (%)	73	74	72	72	73	78	83	84	80	75	74	71	76
Mean monthly sunshine hours	108.6	111.0	143.8	174.4	178.0	169.0	184.7	168.6	142.1	140.4	130.1	122.3	1,773
Percentage possible sunshine	34	35	38	45	42	40	43	41	39	40	42	39	40
Source: China Meteorological Administration
