= Wuzhang Plains =

Plateaus near the Chinese Wei River

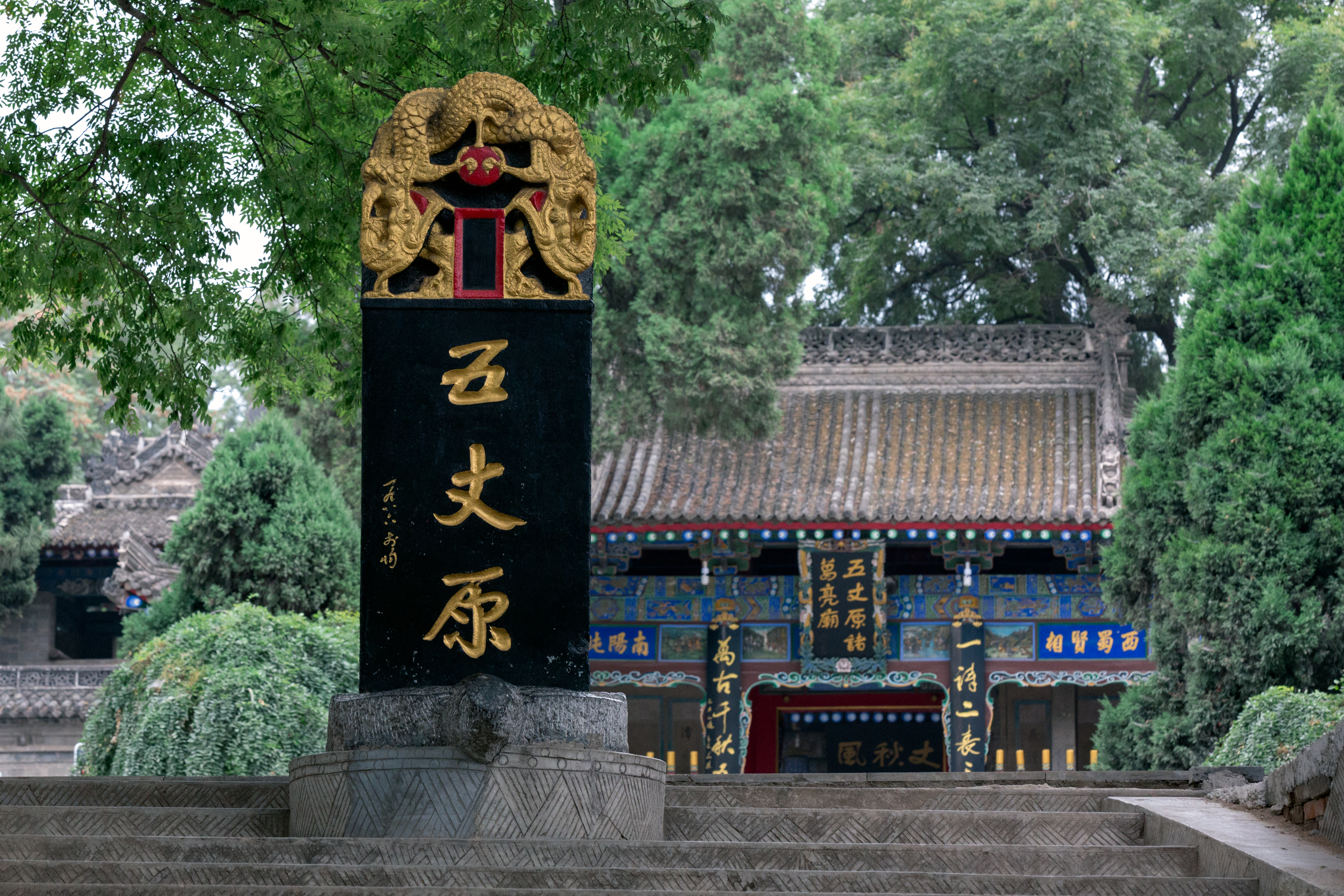
The Temple of Marquis Wu of Wuzhang Plains dedicated to Zhuge Liang

The Wuzhang Plains (五丈原) are plateaus near the Wei River in China. They are now in the Shaanxi province, 56 kilometres from Baoji. The name "Wuzhang" means "five zhang", where zhang (丈) is a Chinese unit of measurement which converts to 3⅓ metre. In actuality, the plains are situated 12 m from sea level, 1 km wide from east to west, and 3.5 km long from north to south. The Qin Mountains are to the plains' south, while the Wei River is at their north, Maili River to their east, and Shitou River to their west.

The hazardous plateaus were the site of the Battle of Wuzhang Plains during the Three Kingdoms period of China. During the battle, the Shu Han military leader Zhuge Liang became ill and died.

At the present, the Wuzhang Plains are a designated scenic region where relics of the Three Kingdoms period scattered across the plains. Many temples were erected there in Zhuge Liang's name, and the sceneries have names that allude to his Northern Expeditions. Because it is known as the site where Zhuge Liang died, many poets of old have journeyed here and left their mark.
