= Jiang Wan =

Shu Han state official and general (died 246)

- 蔣琬
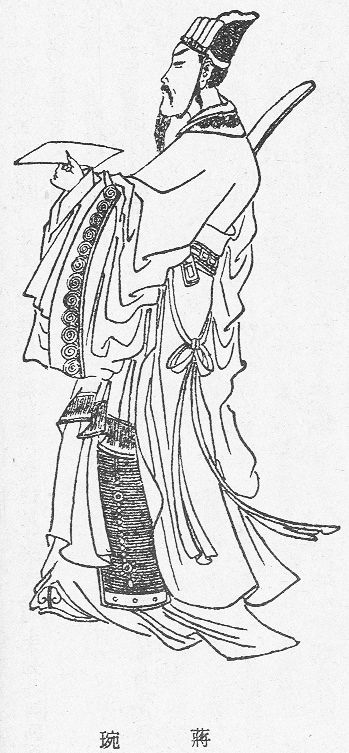
- A Qing dynasty illustration of Jiang Wan

Grand Marshal (大司馬)
- In office April or May 239 – November or December 246
- Monarch: Liu Shan

Manager of the Affairs of the Masters of Writing (錄尚書事)
- In office May 235 – November or December 243
- Monarch: Liu Shan
- Preceded by: Zhuge Liang
- Succeeded by: Fei Yi

General-in-Chief (大將軍)
- In office May 235 – November or December 243
- Monarch: Liu Shan
- Succeeded by: Fei Yi

Inspector of Yi Province (益州刺史)
- In office 234 – 244
- Monarch: Liu Shan
- Preceded by: Zhuge Liang (as Governor)
- Succeeded by: Fei Yi

Protector-General (都護) (acting)
- In office 234 – May 235
- Monarch: Liu Shan

Prefect of the Masters of Writing (尚書令)
- In office 234 – May 235
- Monarch: Liu Shan
- Succeeded by: Fei Yi

Personal details
- Born: Unknown (Note: According to the chronology of Jiang Wan's biography in Sanguozhi, he was at least in his early 20s when he joined Liu Bei in 209/210. Thus, his birth year should be in the 180s or before.) Xiangxiang, Hunan
- Died: November or December 246 (Note: Liu Shan's biography in the Sanguozhi recorded that Jiang Wan died in the 11th month of the 9th year of the Yan'xi era of Liu Shan's reign. This month corresponds to 26 November to 25 December 246 in the Julian calendar.) Mianyang, Sichuan
- Resting place: Mianyang, Sichuan
- Relations: Liu Min (cousin); Pan Jun (relative)
- Children: Jiang Bin; Jiang Xian
- Occupation: Military general, politician, regent
- Courtesy name: Gongyan (公琰)
- Posthumous name: Marquis Gong (恭侯)
- Peerage: Marquis of Anyang Village (安陽亭侯)

Jiang Wan (died November or December 246), courtesy name Gongyan, was a Chinese military general, politician, and regent of the state of Shu during the Three Kingdoms period of China. Born in the late Eastern Han dynasty, Jiang Wan initially served as a scribe, county chief and county prefect under the warlord Liu Bei, who later became the founding emperor of Shu. After Liu Bei's son Liu Shan succeeded his father as emperor in 223, Jiang Wan gradually rose to prominence under the regency of Zhuge Liang, the Imperial Chancellor of Shu. Between 228 and 234, while Zhuge Liang was away leading Shu forces on the Northern Expeditions against Shu's rival state Wei, Jiang Wan took charge of internal affairs and provided logistical support to the Shu forces at the frontline. After Zhuge Liang's death in 234, Jiang Wan succeeded him as regent and did well in gaining the Shu people's confidence and leading them into a post-Zhuge Liang era. During this time, he considered that the land-based route through the Qin Mountains used by Zhuge Liang during the Northern Expeditions was too difficult for navigation and transportation of supplies. He thus came up with a plan to switch to a water-based route along the Han River targeting Wei territories in present-day southern Shaanxi and northwestern Hubei. However, the Shu government rejected his plan as they thought it was too risky. In 243, due to poor health, Jiang Wan relocated from Hanzhong near the Wei–Shu border to Fu County (present-day Mianyang, Sichuan). Towards the final years of his regency, as his health worsened, Jiang Wan gradually relinquished his powers to his deputies Fei Yi and Dong Yun but he continued to rule as regent in name. He died in late 246 and was succeeded by Fei Yi.

== Background ==
Jiang Wan was from Xiangxiang County (湘鄉縣), Lingling Commandery (零陵郡), which is present-day Xiangxiang, Hunan. He and his maternal younger cousin, Liu Min (劉敏), were already quite well known in Lingling Commandery before they even reached the age of adulthood (around 19 years old).

== Service under Liu Bei ==
Around 209 or 210, Jiang Wan came to serve under the warlord Liu Bei, who was also then the Governor of Jing Province (covering present-day Hubei and Hunan), and held the position of a scribe. In 211, he accompanied Liu Bei to Yi Province (covering present-day Sichuan and Chongqing). After Liu Bei seized control of Yi Province in 214, he appointed Jiang Wan as the Chief of Guangdu County (廣都縣; northeast of present-day Shuangliu District, Chengdu, Sichuan).

=== Brief dismissal ===
On one occasion, when Liu Bei visited Guangdu County, he saw that Jiang Wan was not only dead drunk, but had also been neglecting his duties as a county chief. He was so angry that he wanted to execute Jiang Wan for negligence, but his chief adviser Zhuge Liang stopped him and said: "Jiang Wan is an important pillar of society and his talents are far greater than that required to govern an area of just 100 li. His style of government focuses on bringing peace and stability to the people; he does not see the superficial aspects as a priority. I hope that you, My Lord, will examine this issue more closely." Liu Bei respected Zhuge Liang's opinion so he did not punish Jiang Wan. However, he still hastily removed Jiang Wan from office. (Note: When dramatizing Pang Tong's tenure as the county magistrate of Leiyang, Romance of the Three Kingdoms described Pang as being drunk frequently; this may be based off Jiang Wan during his tenure as Chief of Guangdu County. In the novel, Zhuge Liang praised Pang Tong's talents as being far greater than that required to govern an area of just 100 li, an assessment he historically gave to Jiang Wan; compare chapter 57 of Sanguo Yanyi and vol.44 of Sanguozhi.)

=== Restoration to office ===
After his dismissal, Jiang Wan dreamt of an ox's head hanging on a door with blood dripping down. He hated his dream so he asked Zhao Zhi (趙直), a fortune teller, to explain its meaning. Zhao Zhi told him: "One who sees blood is also one who has a keen sense of judgment. The ox's horns and nose form a shape resembling the character gong (公; literally 'duke'), so you, Sir, will rise to a position equivalent to that of a duke in the future. It is a highly auspicious omen. Not long later, Jiang Wan was summoned back to serve as the Prefect of Shifang County.

In 219, after Liu Bei declared himself "King of Hanzhong" (漢中王) following his victory in the Hanzhong Campaign, he appointed Jiang Wan as an official in his royal secretariat.

== During Zhuge Liang's regency ==
In 223, Liu Shan became the emperor of the state of Shu following the death of his father Liu Bei. As Liu Shan was still underage at the time, Zhuge Liang, the Imperial Chancellor of Shu, served as the regent. After creating a personal staff to assist him in administering state affairs, Zhuge Liang employed Jiang Wan to serve as an assistant official in the east bureau of his office.

=== Declining to be a maocai ===
Jiang Wan was later nominated as a maocai (茂才) but he declined the honour and offered it to others such as Liu Yong, Yin Hua (陰化), Pang Yan (龐延) and Liao Chun. Zhuge Liang stopped him and said: "You left your family and home, and travelled a long way to serve the people. We feel for you. There are also people who may not understand your good intentions. That is why all the more you should accept this honour to showcase your merits and contributions. It will also highlight the integrity and rigour of the process of selecting maocais." Jiang Wan was promoted to serve as an Army Adviser (參軍) under Zhuge Liang.

=== Taking charge of internal affairs and providing logistical support ===
In 227, Zhuge Liang mobilised military forces from throughout Shu in preparation for a large-scale campaign against Shu's rival state Wei in the following year. He then moved to the staging area in Hanzhong Commandery while leaving behind Jiang Wan and his chief clerk Zhang Yi to take charge of his office in the Shu capital Chengdu.

In 230, following Zhang Yi's death, Jiang Wan replaced him as Zhuge Liang's chief clerk and was given an additional appointment as General Who Pacifies the Army (撫軍將軍).

Between 228 and 234, while Zhuge Liang was leading Shu forces on a series of military campaigns against Wei, Jiang Wan provided logistical support by ensuring that reinforcements and supplies reached the Shu army at the frontline in timely fashion.

=== Designated as Zhuge Liang's successor ===
Zhuge Liang once said: "Gongyan's ambition is to serve the State with the utmost loyalty and integrity. He will be someone who can work with me to accomplish our State's great mission." He also secretly told Liu Shan: "If I pass away, Jiang Wan can succeed me."

In 234, when Zhuge Liang became critically ill at the Battle of Wuzhang Plains, he told Li Fu that Jiang Wan was the most suitable candidate to succeed him as regent and that Fei Yi could succeed Jiang Wan in turn.

== Jiang Wan's regency ==
=== Succeeding Zhuge Liang as regent of Shu ===
After Zhuge Liang's death in 234, Jiang Wan succeeded him as regent and held the office of Prefect of the Masters of Writing (尚書令). He was subsequently appointed as acting Protector-General (都護), granted imperial authority, and given the gubernatorial appointment of Inspector of Yi Province (益州刺史).

In May 235, Jiang Wan relinquished his position as Prefect of the Masters of Writing to his deputy Fei Yi, got promoted to General-in-Chief (大將軍) and received an additional appointment as Manager of the Affairs of the Masters of Writing (錄尚書事). He was also enfeoffed as the Marquis of Anyang Village (安陽亭侯).

At the time, as Zhuge Liang's death was still quite recent, the people of Shu felt deeply troubled by his passing and began to fear for the future of their state. After Jiang Wan took charge as regent, he demonstrated his talents and skills in leading Shu into a post-Zhuge Liang era. He showed neither sadness nor joy, maintained his composure, and performed his duties as before. Over time, he gradually gained the Shu government and people's confidence in him as their new leader.

=== Receiving orders to attack Wei ===
In 238, the Shu emperor Liu Shan issued an imperial decree to Jiang Wan as follows: "The enemy has yet to be defeated. Cao Rui is arrogant and vicious. The people in the three commanderies in Liaodong have long suffered from tyranny so they have decided to band together and break free from Wei rule. Cao Rui has sent an army to attack Liaodong and suppress the rebellion. In the past, the fall of the Qin dynasty started with an uprising led by Chen Sheng and Wu Guang. The rebellion in Liaodong is a Heaven-granted opportunity for us. You should prepare the troops for battle, mobilise them and get them ready in Hanzhong. Once Wu makes a move, both the east and west will launch a coordinated attack on Wei and seize the opportunity to secure victory."

Liu Shan then granted Jiang Wan permission to create a personal staff to assist him in administering state affairs. In April or May of the following year, he gave Jiang Wan an additional appointment as Grand Marshal (大司馬).

=== Ideas on taking an alternative route to attack Wei ===
Jiang Wan considered that one reason for the failure of Zhuge Liang's Northern Expeditions against Wei was that he chose the difficult route through the Qin Mountains; the mountainous terrain had made it difficult for the Shu army to navigate their way and transport their supplies to the frontline. Jiang Wan then thought of switching from the land-based route to a water-based one. According to his plan, the Shu forces would construct more warships and sail along the Han River to attack the Wei-controlled Weixing (魏興) and Shangyong (上庸) commanderies in present-day southern Shaanxi and northwestern Hubei.

However, due to poor health, Jiang Wan was unable to set his plan into motion. When his plan was put up for discussion in the Shu imperial court, many officials objected to it and pointed out that the water-based route was too risky and not viable in the long term. The main reason was that if the Shu forces failed to capture Weixing and Shangyong commanderies, it would be much more difficult for them to retreat back to Shu along the Han River than if they were to retreat via a land-based route. The Shu emperor Liu Shan then sent Fei Yi and Jiang Wei to Hanzhong Commandery to meet Jiang Wan and present their case for rejecting Jiang Wan's plan.

=== Relocation to Fu County ===
In response, Jiang Wan wrote a memorial to Liu Shan as follows:

"It is my responsibility to destroy evil and save the people from their troubles. It has been six years since I received orders to station at Hanzhong. I am untalented, unwise and in poor health. I have been unable to implement my grand plan and I have been feeling worried day and night. As of today, Wei controls nine provinces and its foundation is very solid. It will not be easy to eliminate Wei. If the east and west can work together and launch a coordinated strike, we can at least divide and conquer parts of Wei and gradually cut off its bases of support even if we cannot accomplish our great mission in such a short span of time. However, Wu has been delaying their military operations and has failed to hit their targets. This is indeed worrying. I can neither dine nor sleep in peace. Whenever I discuss with Fei Yi and the others, I always believe that Liang Province is an important and strategic location for both the local tribes and the enemy. Besides, the Qiang and Hu people dearly miss the days of the Han dynasty. In the past, when we sent a small force to ally with the Qiang, we managed to defeat Guo Huai. After carefully weighing all these considerations, I think that Liang Province is our top priority. We should appoint Jiang Wei as the Inspector of Liang Province. Jiang Wei can lead our forces into battle and hold the enemy's attention at the west of the Wei River, while I will lead another army to provide support to him. Fu County is well-connected to its surrounding areas and provides good access to them. If war breaks out in the northeast, I can lead our forces to defend our border in the shortest time possible."

In late October or November 243, Liu Shan approved Jiang Wan's request to relocate from Hanzhong Commandery to Fu County (涪縣; present-day Mianyang, Sichuan).

=== Death ===
In late November or December 243, as his health deteriorated, Jiang Wan relinquished his positions as General-in-Chief (大將軍) and Manager of the Affairs of the Masters of Writing (錄尚書事) to Fei Yi, thus making the latter the de facto head of the Shu government. In the following year, Dong Yun succeeded Fei Yi as Prefect of the Masters of Writing (尚書令)

Jiang Wan's health continued to worsen over time until he died sometime between 26 November and 25 December 246. Liu Shan honoured him with the posthumous title "Marquis Gong" (恭侯; literally "respectful marquis").

== Appraisal ==
Chen Shou, the third-century historian who wrote Jiang Wan's biography in the Sanguozhi, praised Jiang Wan for his success in maintaining order and stability in Shu, and noted that he had the image of a dignified authority figure. He gave credit to Jiang Wan and his successor Fei Yi for following in Zhuge Liang's footsteps and pointed out that in doing so they managed to secure Shu's borders and maintain peace and harmony within Shu. However, he also criticised them for not putting in their best to govern a small state like Shu and keeping it safe.

The fifth-century historian Pei Songzhi, who annotated the Sanguozhi, disagreed with Chen Shou's point of view. He argued that Jiang Wan and Fei Yi did well during their regencies when they refrained from making risky moves that could jeopardise Shu's future and when they successfully countered a Wei invasion and maintained peace within Shu's borders. He also pointed out that readers may find Chen Shou's concluding remarks confusing because Chen Shou did not provide any evidence to support his claim that Jiang Wan and Fei Yi did not put in their best to govern Shu and keep it safe.

Chang Qu, who wrote extensively about the history of the Sichuan region in the Chronicles of Huayang (Huayang Guo Zhi), praised Jiang Wan and Fei Yi for perpetuating Zhuge Liang's principles, as well as keeping the land of Shu Han safe while they were encircled by two bigger states. He also recorded that the people of Shu named Zhuge Liang, Jiang Wan, Fei Yi and Dong Yun as the four heroic chancellors of their state.

=== Incidents with Yang Xi and Yang Min ===
Yang Xi was known for being curt and terse when speaking to others. There were times when he completely ignored Jiang Wan while the latter was talking to him. Someone once told Jiang Wan: "Sir, when you speak to Yang Xi, he completely ignores you. He is so rude and disrespectful to you. Isn't that too much?" Jiang Wan replied: "People have different personalities in the same way they have different appearances. The ancients had long cautioned us about people who pretend to be nice in front of you and speak ill of you behind your back. Yang Xi never intended to praise me. If he openly disagreed with me, he would reveal my weaknesses. That was why he ignored me. That's how he's being honest with me."

Yang Min (楊敏) once criticised Jiang Wan for being "muddleheaded" and "inferior compared to his predecessor". When an official suggested conducting an investigation and taking disciplinary action against Yang Min, Jiang Wan said: "I am indeed inferior compared to my predecessor. Why is there a need to investigate?" He turned down the official's repeated calls to make a case against Yang Min. When the official sought permission to ask Yang Min to produce evidence to substantiate his claims, Jiang Wan said: "If I am inferior compared to my predecessor, then I am being unreasonable in how I handle issues. If I am unreasonable in the way I handle issues, then I am indeed muddleheaded. Why do you need to ask him?" When Yang Min committed an offence later and ended up being imprisoned, his colleagues feared the worst for him. However, Jiang Wan did not hold a grudge against Yang Min and even helped him obtain a pardon.

These two incidents showed that Jiang Wan was a reasonable and well-meaning person.

== Liu Min ==
Liu Min (劉敏) was from Quanling County (泉陵縣), Lingling Commandery (零陵郡), which is present-day Lingling District, Hunan. He reached the rank of Left Protector of the Army (左護軍) and General Who Protects the Army (護軍將軍). And along with his superior Wang Ping defended Hanzhong against Wei incursions. In 244, when Cao Shuang led the Wei army to attack Shu. Among the army, some advisers believed that they shouldn't confront the enemy in open field and all they needed to do was to defend the cities. With time, the enemy forces would retreat by themselves. Liu Min was against this idea since many of the farmer's families were still working on their land while the recolt were not yet stocked in the granaries. Therefore if they let the enemy enter their land, all of their supply would be lost. So he led those under his command along with Wang Ping to occupy Mount Xingshi (興勢山). Liu Min placed many flags and banners over a hundred li among the fortifications to create the illusion of a greater army. When reinforcement from the Shu army led by Fei Yi arrived, the Wei army was forced to withdraw. To reward him for his achievements, he was enfeoffed as the Marquis of Yunting (雲亭侯).

== Family ==
Jiang Wan's elder son, Jiang Bin (蔣斌), inherited his father's peerage and became the next Marquis of Anyang Village (安陽亭侯). Like his father, he served as a general in Shu and held the rank of General of Pacifying Martial Might (綏武將軍) and appointment of an Army Protector (護軍) in Hancheng County (漢城縣; present-day Mian County, Shaanxi).

In 263, during the Wei invasion of Shu, when Wei general Zhong Hui and his troops approached Hancheng County, he wrote a letter to Jiang Bin as follows: "There are many talented and virtuous people in Shu. People like you and Zhuge Siyuan are like me and there are so many others like you too. It has been our ancestors' practice to pay respects to great sages of the past. Today, when I come to Shu, I want to visit your father's tomb, clean it up, and pay my respects to him. I hope you will tell me where it is."

Jiang Bin replied: "I know that you are someone who understands me and I hope to become friends with you. Now that you have made such a polite request, it would be rude of me to reject you. My late father fell sick and passed away in Fu County. After the fengshui masters said that Fu County was a good location, we had him buried there. Sir, you came all the way to Shu for the purpose of visiting his tomb and paying your respects. Yan Hui also showed his virtuous character when he treated Confucius like his father. Now, after receiving your letter, I feel deeply saddened and I miss my father even more."

Zhong Hui felt impressed by Jiang Bin's honourable character after receiving his reply. He then headed to Fu County, found Jiang Wan's tomb, and paid his respects there. After the fall of Shu in late 263, Jiang Bin went to Fu County to meet Zhong Hui and became friends with him. He was killed by mutinying soldiers in March 264 when Zhong Hui started a rebellion in Chengdu against the Wei regent Sima Zhao.

Jiang Wan's younger son, Jiang Xian (蔣顯), served as an attendant to the Shu crown prince Liu Xuan. Zhong Hui also appreciated Jiang Xian for his talent and befriended him as well. Jiang Xian died together with his brother during the chaos caused by Zhong Hui's rebellion in March 264.

== See also ==
- Lists of people of the Three Kingdoms
