= Timeline of the Three Kingdoms period =

Timeline about the Wei, Wu, and Shu states

Timeline of territorial changes during the Three Kingdoms period.

This is a timeline of the Three Kingdoms period (220–280) of Chinese history. In a strict academic sense, the Three Kingdoms period refers to the interval between the founding of the state of Cao Wei (220–266) in 220 and the conquest of the state of Eastern Wu (229–280) by the Western Jin dynasty (265–316) in 280. However, many Chinese historians and laymen extend the starting point of this period back to the Yellow Turban Rebellion that took place in 184 during the late Eastern Han dynasty (25–220).

== 180s ==
Year	Date	Event
184	spring	Yellow Turban Rebellion: The Yellow Turbans ravage the north and east and are defeated
184	winter	Liang Province rebellion: A rebellion occurs in Liang province (Liangzhou; 涼州; roughly present-day Wuwei, Gansu)
185		The imperial palace is damaged by fire and special taxes are levied for rebuilding
188		Governors are appointed to unify provincial administrations
189	summer	Emperor Ling of Han dies; Empress He and her brother He Jin enthrone Liu Bian and establish a regency government
189	winter	The Ten Eunuchs kill He Jin and are themselves massacred by Yuan Shao; Dong Zhuo takes control of Luoyang and deposes Liu Bian in favor of his half-brother Liu Xie, Emperor Xian of Han
189		Campaign against Dong Zhuo: An anti-Dong Zhuo alliance forms in the east, led by Yuan Shao

== 190s ==
Year	Date	Event
190		Dong Zhuo burns Luoyang, loots the imperials tombs, and relocates to Chang'an
190		Battle of Xingyang: Dong Zhuo defeated Cao Cao at Xingyang, Henan
190		The Coalition breaks up and local officials set themselves up as warlords
191		Battle of Yangcheng: Battle between Yuan Shao and Yuan Shu
191		Battle of Xiangyang: Sun Jian dies.
191		Zhang Lu sets up a theocracy in Hanzhong.
192		Battle of Chang'an: Wang Yun and Lü Bu kill Dong Zhuo and Wang Yun himself is killed by Dong Zhuo's officers Li Jue and Guo Si
192		The Han dynasty scholar Cai Yong dies.
193		Cao Cao's invasion of Xu Province: Liu Bei first territory as a result of Cao Cao's campaign.
194		Battle of Yan Province: Cao Cao takes over Yan Province.
195		Emperor Xian of Han escapes from Chang'an
195		Sun Ce sets up south of the Changjiang, Sun Ce's conquests in Jiangdong begin.
196		Emperor Xian of Han relocates to Xuchang under Cao Cao's control
197		Campaign against Yuan Shu: Yuan Shu takes the imperial title but is driven south by Cao Cao
197		War between Cao Cao and Zhang Xiu begin.
199		Battle of Xiapi: Cao Cao and Liu Bei defeated Lu Bu.
199		Battle of Yijing: Yuan Shao eliminates Gongsun Zan in You Province.
199		Yuan Shu dies

== 200s ==
Year	Date	Event
200		Battle of Guandu: Yuan Shao is defeated by Cao Cao northeast of modern Zhongmou, Henan
200		Sun Ce dies and is succeeded by his brother Sun Quan
200		Zheng Xuan dies
202		Yuan Shao dies and is succeeded by his younger son Yuan Shang
202		Battle of Bowang: Liu Bei defeats Cao Cao at Bowang (near present-day Fancheng District, Hubei)
203		Cao Cao's campaigns to unify northern China begin
203		Battle of Xiakou: Battle between the warlords Sun Quan and Liu Biao
207		Battle of White Wolf Mountain: Cao Cao defeats Yuan Shang and the Wuhuan, Cao Cao unites northern China
208		Battle of Jiangxia: Sun Quan defeats Liu Biao and beheads Huang Zu
208		Zhuge Liang advises Liu Bei, Liu Biao dies, Cao Cao takes over Jing Province.
208		Battle of Changban: Zhao Yun rescues Liu Shan, Liu Bei escapes to Xiakou.
208		Battle of Red Cliffs: Cao Cao is defeated on Changjiang, west of modern Jiangxia, Hubei, by Sun Quan and Liu Bei

== 210s ==
Year	Date	Event
210		Liu Bei occupies the south of Jing Province
211		Battle of Tong Pass: Cao Cao defeats Ma Chao and Han Sui and starts campaigning in northwestern China
211		Liu Bei's takeover of Yi Province: Liu Zhang invites Liu Bei to Yi Province (covering present-day Sichuan and Chongqing)
214		Liu Bei's takeover of Yi Province: Liu Bei takes control of Yi Province from Liu Zhang
215		Battle of Yangping: Zhang Lu surrenders Hanzhong to Cao Cao
216		Cao Cao declares himself King of Wei
219	spring	Battle of Mount Dingjun: Liu Bei defeats and slays Cao Cao's general Xiahou Yuan and takes Hanzhong
219	autumn	Liu Bei becomes King of Hanzhong
219	autumn	Battle of Fancheng: Liu Bei's general Guan Yu attacks north in Jing Province
219	winter	Lü Meng's invasion of Jing Province: Sun Quan's general Lü Meng attacks Guan Yu and seizes the south of Jing Province

== 220s ==
Year	Date	Event
220		Guan Yu is executed by Sun Quan.
220	spring	Cao Cao dies at Luoyang and is succeeded by his son Cao Pi.
220		The Nine-rank system is implemented.
220	winter	Cao Pi forces Emperor Xian of Han to abdicate and declares himself Emperor of the Wei dynasty; so ends the Han dynasty.
221		Liu Bei declares himself emperor of Han.
222		Battle of Xiaoting: Liu Bei is defeated by Sun Quan's general Lu Xun.
222		Cao Pi's invasions of Eastern Wu: Sun Quan declares independence from Cao Wei; Cao Pi invades Eastern Wu.
223		Cao Pi's invasions of Eastern Wu: Sun Quan's forces repel Cao Wei.
223		Liu Bei dies and is succeeded by Liu Shan.
225		Incident at Guangling: Cao Pi attempts to invade Sun Quan's territory but later withdraws without fighting.
225		Zhuge Liang's Southern Campaign: Zhuge Liang conquers Nanzhong.
226		Cao Pi dies and is succeeded by Cao Rui.
226		The Jiaozhou warlord, Shi Xie dies; Sun Quan establishes Guangzhou from parts of Jiaozhou.
227		Sun Quan quells Shi Hui's rebellion and seizes Jiaozhou; Sun Quan abolishes Guangzhou.
227		Zhuge Liang presents the Chu Shi Biao to Liu Shan.
228		Xincheng Rebellion: Sima Yi quells Meng Da's rebellion.
228		Zhuge Liang's Northern Expeditions: Zhuge Liang's first northern expedition against Cao Wei; Ma Su is defeated by Zhang He.
228		Battle of Shiting: Lu Xun defeats Cao Wei forces led by Cao Xiu.
229		Zhuge Liang's Northern Expeditions: Zhuge Liang's second northern expedition. He is forced to retreat due to arrival of Cao Wei reinforcements.
229		Sun Quan proclaims himself "Emperor of Wu" in Jianye (Nanjing); Wu enters an alliance with Shu Han.
229		Zhuge Liang's Northern Expeditions: Zhuge Liang captures Wudu (武都; near present-day Cheng County, Gansu) and Yinping (陰平; present-day Wen County, Gansu) on his third northern expedition.

== 230s ==
Year	Date	Event
230		Eastern Wu expedition troops land on a legendary island known as Yizhou where most of them die but manage to bring back "several thousand" natives back to China.
230		Ziwu Campaign: Cao Wei forces led by Cao Zhen invade Shu Han but later retreated.
231		Zhuge Liang invents the wooden ox.
231		Zhuge Liang's Northern Expeditions: Zhuge Liang's fourth northern expedition. He is forced to withdraw after provisions are exhausted, but managed to kill Zhang He during his retreat.
231		Battle of Hefei: Sun Quan is repelled by Man Chong; Wang Ling is ambushed by Eastern Wu forces.
232		The Cao Wei poet, Cao Zhi dies.
233		Sun Quan sends an envoy to Gongsun Yuan in the northeast, but the envoy is killed and brought to Cao Wei
233		Battle of Hefei: Sun Quan is repelled by Man Chong.
234		Emperor Xian of Han dies.
234		Battle of Wuzhang Plains: Zhuge Liang dies on his fifth and last northern expedition against Cao Wei; Jiang Wan succeeds Zhuge Liang.
234		Battle of Hefei: Sun Quan commands his last attack on Hefei but is repelled by Man Chong.
234		Zhuge Ke campaigns against the Shanyue people of Danyang Commandery.
235		Cao Wei assassinates the Xianbei chieftain, Kebineng.
235		The Cao Wei mechanical engineer, Ma Jun invents the south-pointing chariot.
237		Gongsun Yuan declares himself King of Yan.
237		Zhuge Ke completes his subjugation of the Shanyue.
238		Cao Wei receives envoys from Himiko of Yamatai.
238		Sima Yi's Liaodong campaign: Sima Yi kills Gongsun Yuan and annexes his territory.
239		Cao Rui dies and is succeeded by Cao Fang but real power is wielded by the co-regents Sima Yi and Cao Shuang.

== 240s ==
Year	Date	Event
240		Beginning of the Zhengshi reign era (240–249) in Cao Wei; philosophical movements such as Xuanxue and Qingtan as well as the Seven Sages of the Bamboo Grove emerge in Wei during the era.
240		Jiang Wei's Northern Expeditions: Jiang Wei's first northern expedition against Cao Wei.
241		Battle of Quebei and Fancheng: Eastern Wu attacks Cao Wei in Yangzhou and Jingzhou but later withdraws.
241		Sun Quan's heir apparent, Sun Deng, dies.
242		Sun He becomes Crown Prince of Eastern Wu; Sun He and Sun Ba compete to become Sun Quan's heir apparent, splitting the Wu court into two factions.
242		Goguryeo–Wei War: Goguryeo raids Cao Wei at Xi'anping (西安平; near present-day Dandong, Liaoning).
244		Battle of Xingshi: Cao Wei forces led by Cao Shuang are repelled by Shu Han.
244		Goguryeo–Wei War: Cao Wei general Guanqiu Jian defeats Goguryeo, taking Gungnae.
245		Goguryeo–Wei War: Guanqiu Jian sends his armies to pursue Dongcheon of Goguryeo and subjugate Eastern Ye.
245		The Eastern Wu Imperial Chancellor, Lu Xun dies.
246		Baekje attacks Cao Wei forces at Lelang and Daifang commanderies but later sues for peace.
246		Jiang Wan and Dong Yun dies; Fei Yi and Chen Zhi succeeds Jiang Wan and Dong Yun respectively.
247		Jiang Wei's Northern Expeditions: Jiang Wei's second northern expedition.
248		Jiang Wei's Northern Expeditions: Jiang Wei's third northern expedition.
248		Lady Triệu leads Viet rebels in Jiaozhou but is defeated by Eastern Wu.
249		Incident at the Gaoping Tombs: Sima Yi kills Cao Shuang and He Yan, taking over the Cao Wei government.
249		The Cao Wei philosopher, Wang Bi dies.
249		Jiang Wei's Northern Expeditions: Jiang Wei's fourth northern expedition.

== 250s ==
Year	Date	Event
250		Jiang Wei's Northern Expeditions: Jiang Wei's fifth northern expedition.
250		Sun Quan exiles Sun He and kills Sun Ba; Sun Liang is installed as Crown Prince.
251		Three Rebellions in Shouchun: Sima Yi quells Wang Ling's Rebellion.
251		Sima Yi dies and his son Sima Shi succeeds him.
252		Sima Shi gains the title of "Great General".
252		Sun Quan dies and is succeeded by Sun Liang; Zhuge Ke assumes regency.
253		Battle of Dongxing: Zhuge Ke defeats Cao Wei forces at Dongxing
253		Fei Yi is assassinated; Jiang Wei succeeds Fei Yi.
253		Battle of Hefei: Eastern Wu forces led by Zhuge Ke are repelled by Cao Wei.
253		Jiang Wei's Northern Expeditions: Jiang Wei's sixth northern expedition.
253		Sun Jun and Sun Chen kill Zhuge Ke; Sun Jun assumes regency.
254		Jiang Wei's Northern Expeditions: Jiang Wei captures Didao (狄道; around present-day Lintao County, Gansu), Heguan (河關; in the vicinity of present-day Dingxi, Gansu) and Lintao on his seventh northern expedition.
254		Sima Shi deposes Cao Fang and replaces him with Cao Mao
255		Three Rebellions in Shouchun: Sima Shi quells Guanqiu Jian and Wen Qin's Rebellion.
255		Sima Shi dies and his brother Sima Zhao takes over.
255		Battle of Didao: Jiang Wei is defeated by Cao Wei forces in his eight northern expedition; Shu Han loses territorial gains from Jiang Wei's seventh expedition.
256		Jiang Wei's Northern Expeditions: Jiang Wei's ninth northern expedition.
256		Sun Jun dies; Sun Chen assumes regency.
256		The Cao Wei scholar, Wang Su dies.
257		Three Rebellions in Shouchun: The Cao Wei general, Zhuge Dan rebels in Shouchun.
257		Jiang Wei's Northern Expeditions: Jiang Wei's tenth northern expedition.
258		Three Rebellions in Shouchun: Sima Zhao quells Zhuge Dan's Rebellion.
258		Sun Liang is deposed by Sun Chen and Sun Xiu succeeds him.
258		Chen Zhi dies; Chen Zhi's ally, the eunuch, Huang Hao begins to dominate the Shu Han court.
259		Sun Xiu kills Sun Chen.
259		Goguryeo–Wei War: Cao Wei forces are defeated by Goguryeo at Yangmaenggok.

== 260s ==
Year	Date	Event
260		Sima Zhao’s Regicide: Sima Zhao kills Cao Mao and replaces him with Cao Huan.
260		Sun Liang dies.
261		The Tuoba-Xianbei chieftain, Tuoba Liwei submits to Cao Wei.
262		Jiang Wei's Northern Expeditions: Jiang Wei launches his eleventh and final northern expedition.
262		Sima Zhao kills Ji Kang, one of the Seven Sages of the Bamboo Grove.
263		Jiao Province Campaign: Viet people in Jiaozhou (Northern Vietnam) under Lã Hưng revolted against Eastern Wu. Cao Wei (later the Western Jin) sends armies to aid the rebels.
263		Conquest of Shu by Wei: Liu Shan surrenders to Sima Zhao; so ends Shu Han.
264		Cao Wei establishes Liangzhou (梁州).
264		Zhong Hui's Rebellion: Zhong Hui and Jiang Wei rebel in Chengdu but are killed by mutineers.
264		Siege of Yong'an: Luo Xian repels Eastern Wu forces from claiming former Shu Han territories.
264		Sima Zhao declares himself King of Jin.
264		Eastern Wu re-establishes Guangzhou.
264		Sun Xiu dies and is succeeded by Sun Hao.
265		Sima Zhao dies and is succeeded by Sima Yan.
266		Sima Yan deposes Cao Huan and declares himself emperor of the Western Jin dynasty, so ends Cao Wei.
268		Eastern Wu attacks Western Jin on multiple fronts but is repelled; Lâm Ấp and Funan send tributes to Jin.
269		Jiao Province Campaign: Eastern Wu launches counteroffensive into Jiaozhou.
269		Western Jin establishes Qinzhou.

== 270s ==
Year	Date	Event
270		Tufa Shujineng's Rebellion: Tufa Shujineng leads tribal rebellion against Western Jin in Qinzhou and Liangzhou (涼州).
270		The Shu Han scholar, Qiao Zhou dies.
271		Liu Shan dies.
271		Jiao Province Campaign: Eastern Wu recaptures Jiaozhou from Western Jin.
272		Western Jin quells Xiongnu rebellion in Bingzhou.
272		Battle of Xiling: Eastern Wu forces led by Lu Kang defeat Western Jin and recapture Xiling (in present-day Xiling District, Hubei)
274		Cao Fang dies.
275		Tufa Shujineng's Rebellion: Tufa Shujineng surrenders to Western Jin.
277		Tufa Shujineng's Rebellion: Tufa Shujineng rebels again.
279		Tufa Shujineng's Rebellion: Tufa Shujineng captures Liangzhou; Western Jin forces led by Ma Long quells the rebellion.
279		Conquest of Wu by Jin: Western Jin begins its conquest of Eastern Wu.

== 280s ==
Year	Date	Event
280		Conquest of Wu by Jin: Sun Hao surrenders to Western Jin; so ends Eastern Wu and the Three Kingdoms period.

== Gallery ==
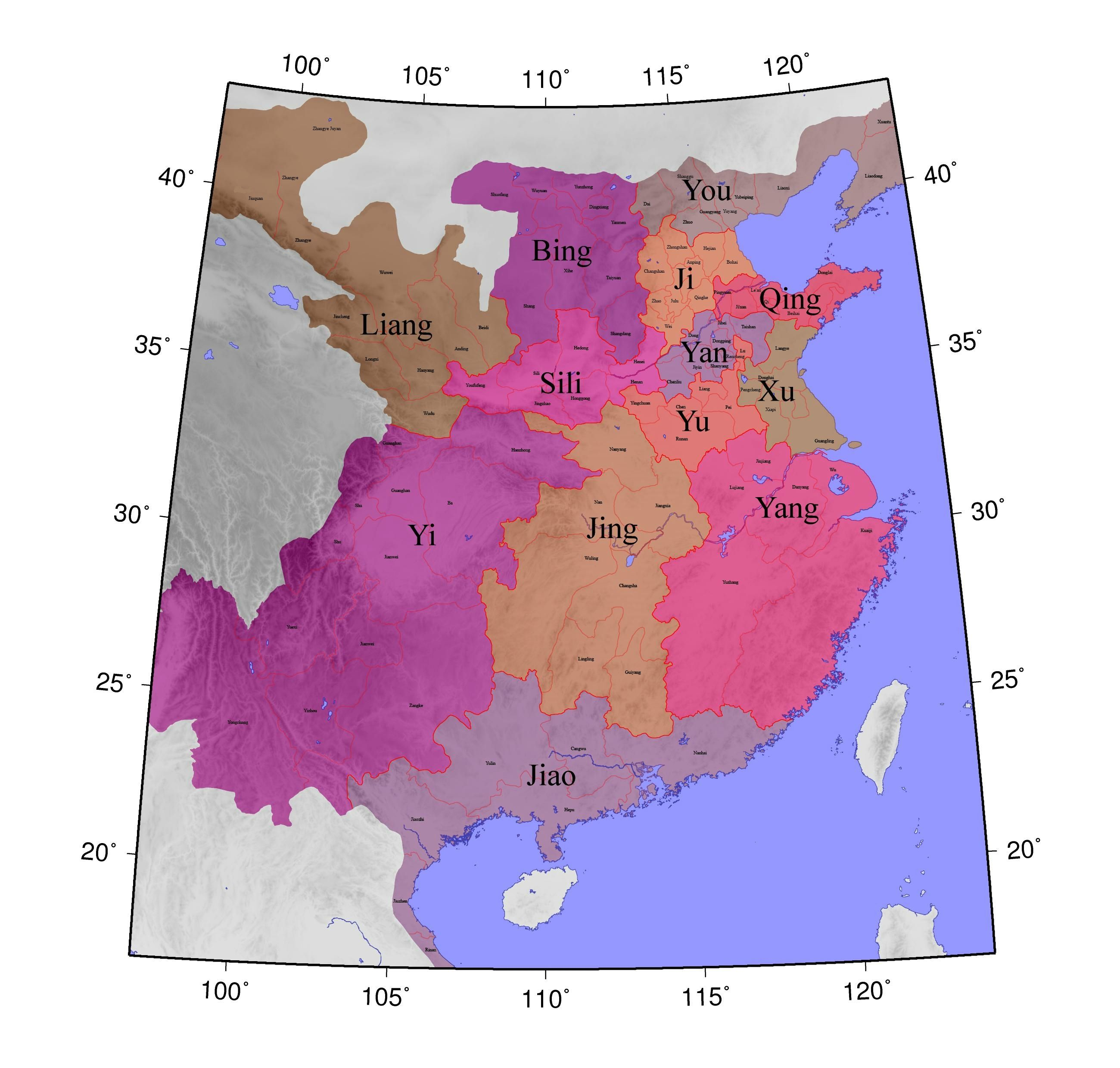
Late Han dynasty provinces

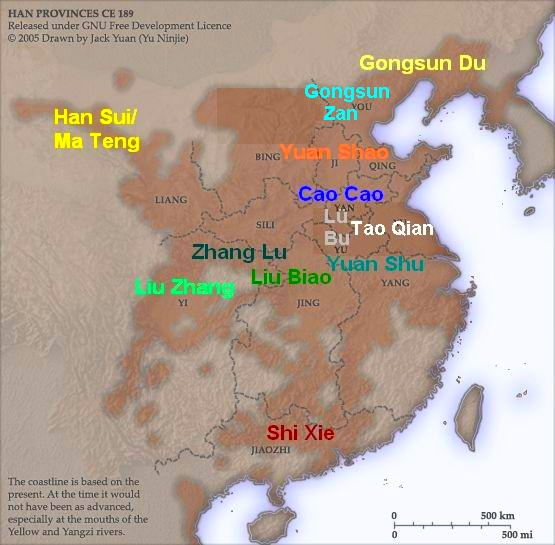
Warlords 194

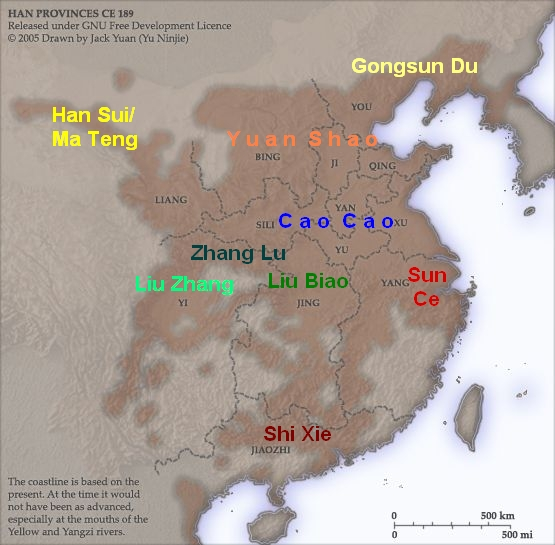
Warlords 199

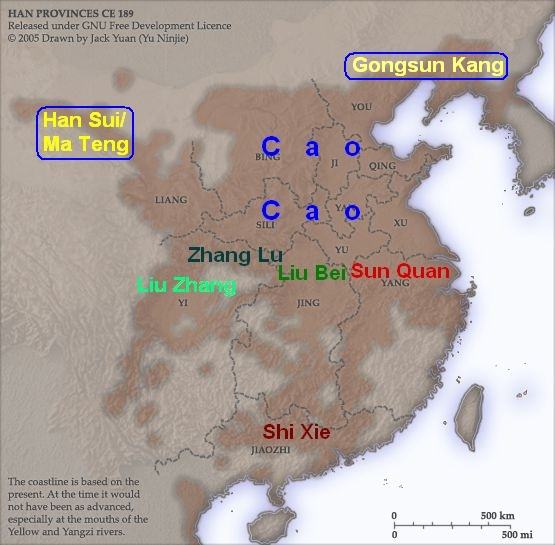
Warlords 208

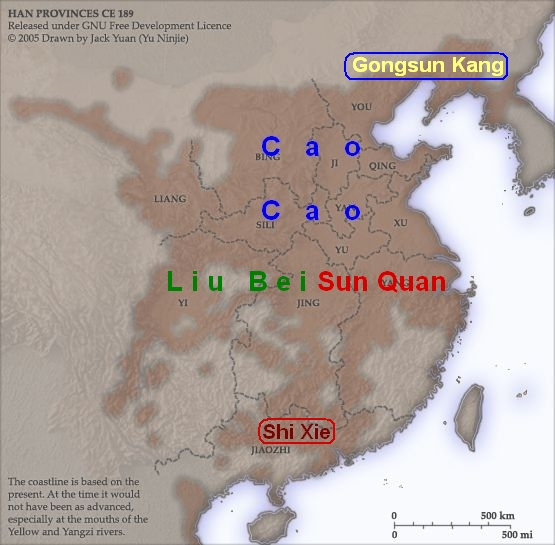
Warlords 215

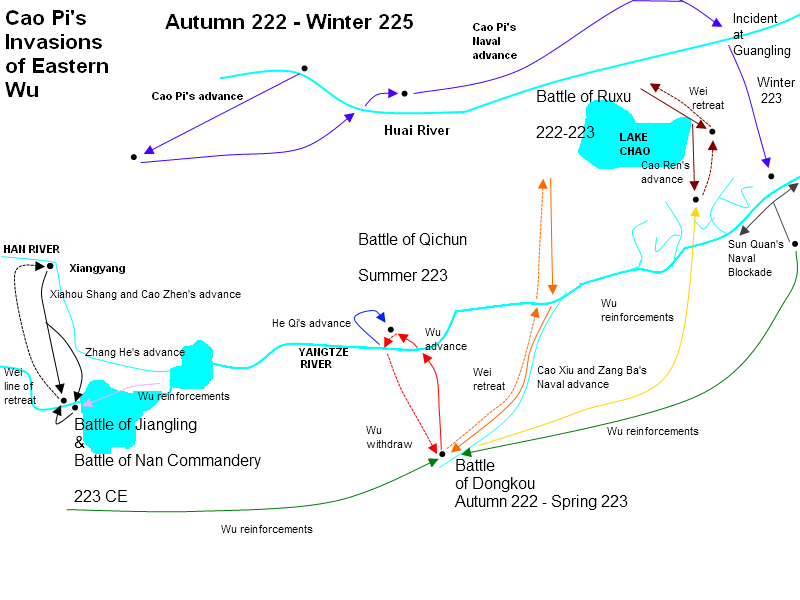
Cao Pi's invasions of Eastern Wu (222–225)

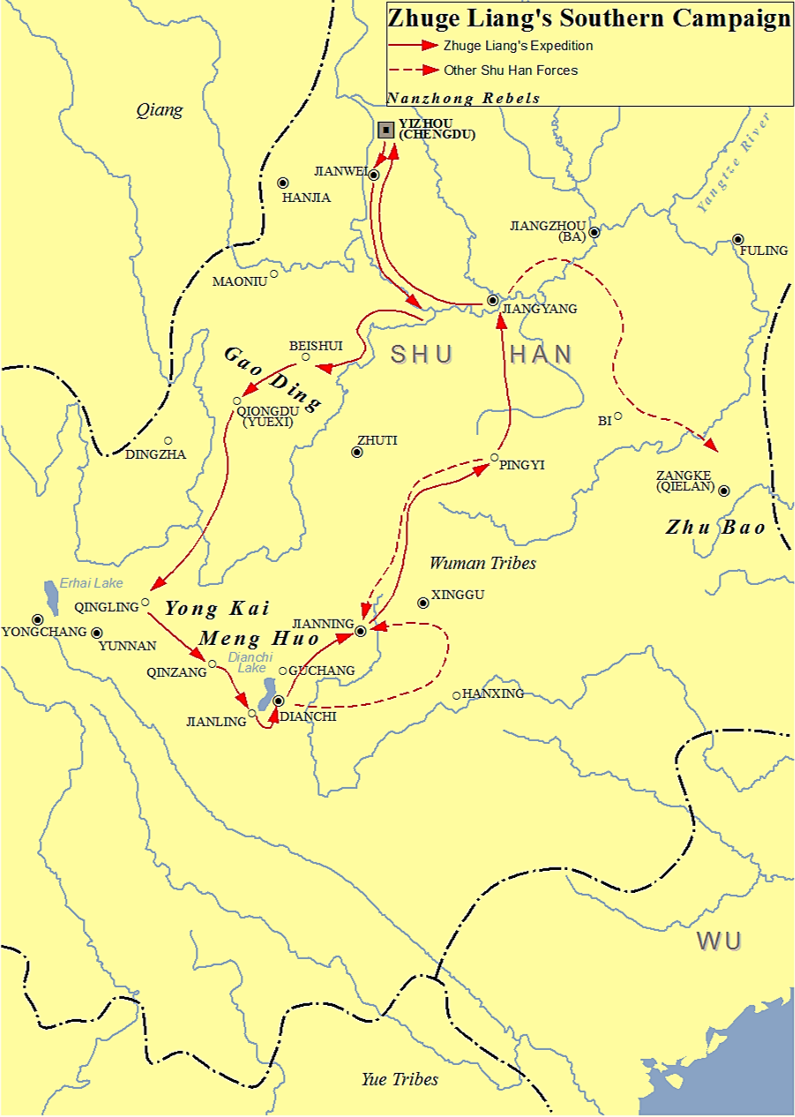
Zhuge Liang's Southern Campaign in 225

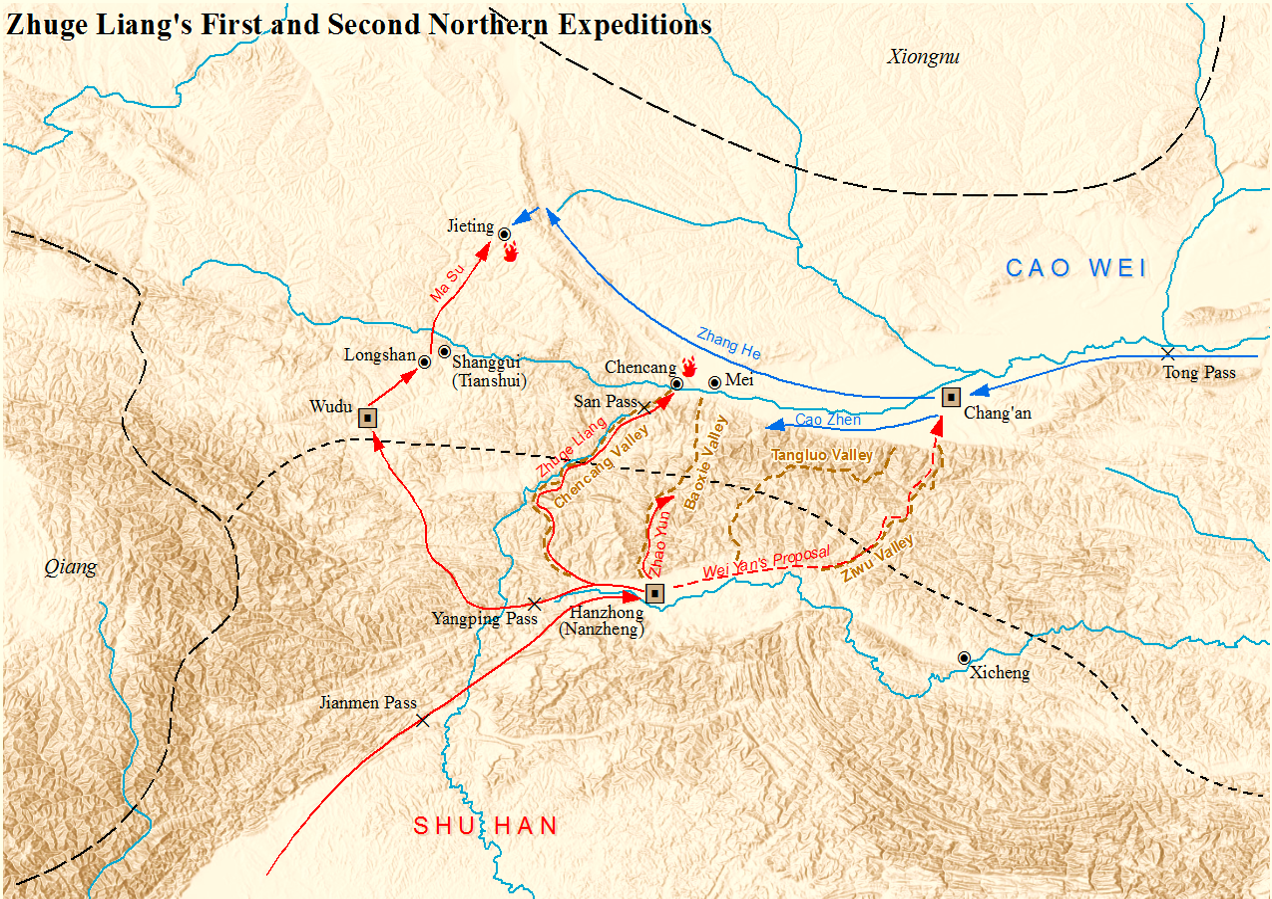
Zhuge Liang's first and second Northern Expeditions (228–229)

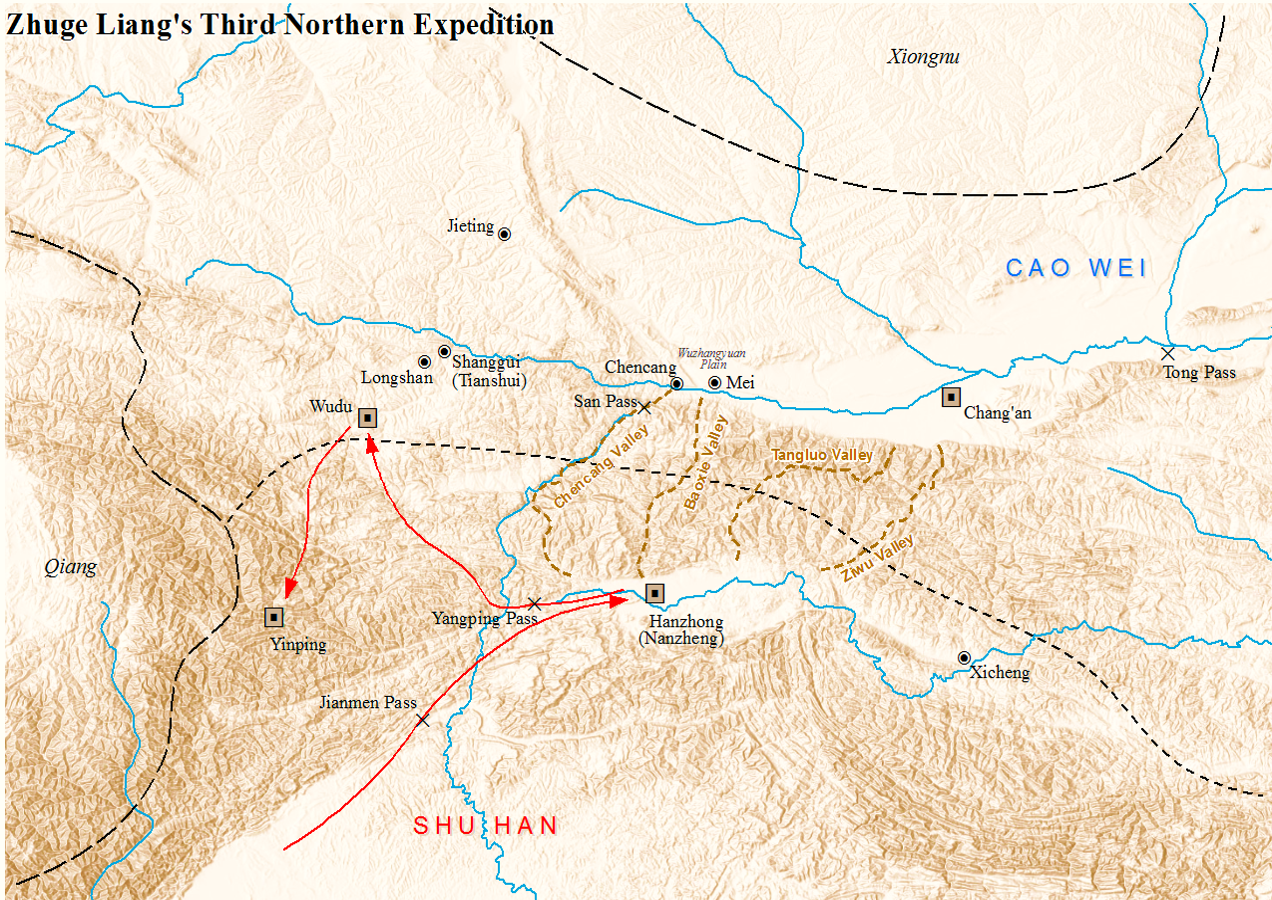
Zhuge Liang's third northern expedition in 229

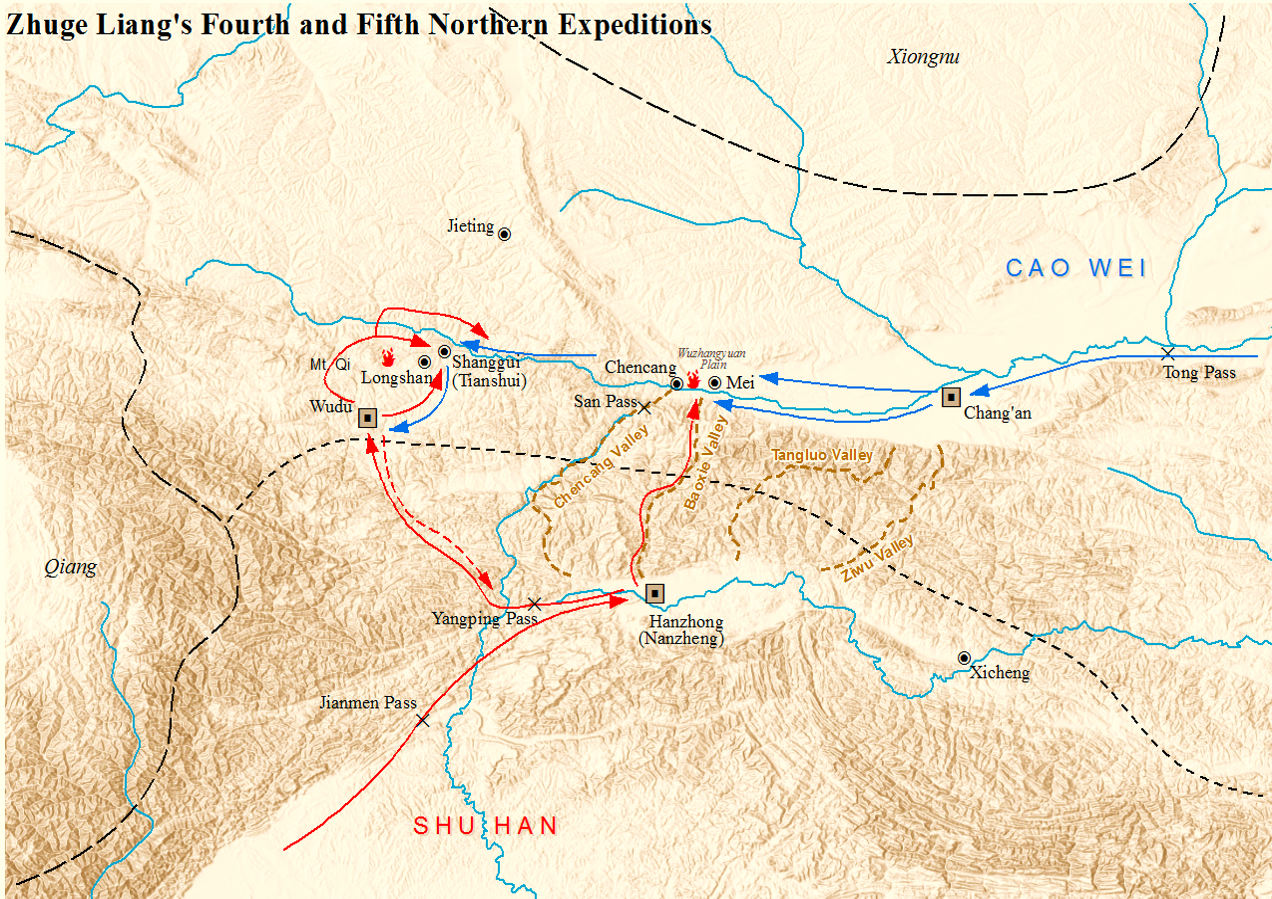
Zhuge Liang's fourth and fifth northern expeditions in 231 and 234

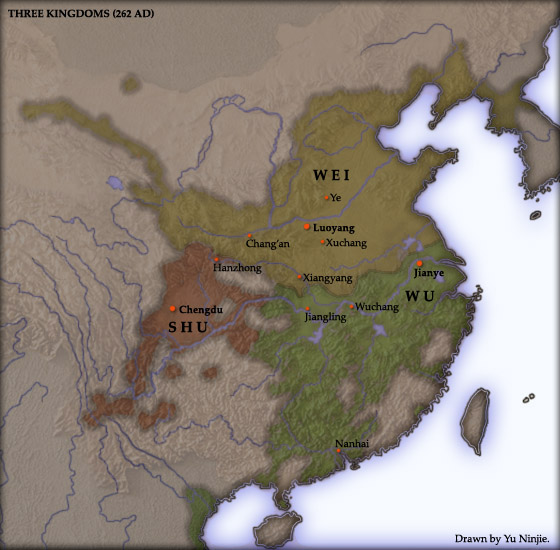
China in 262

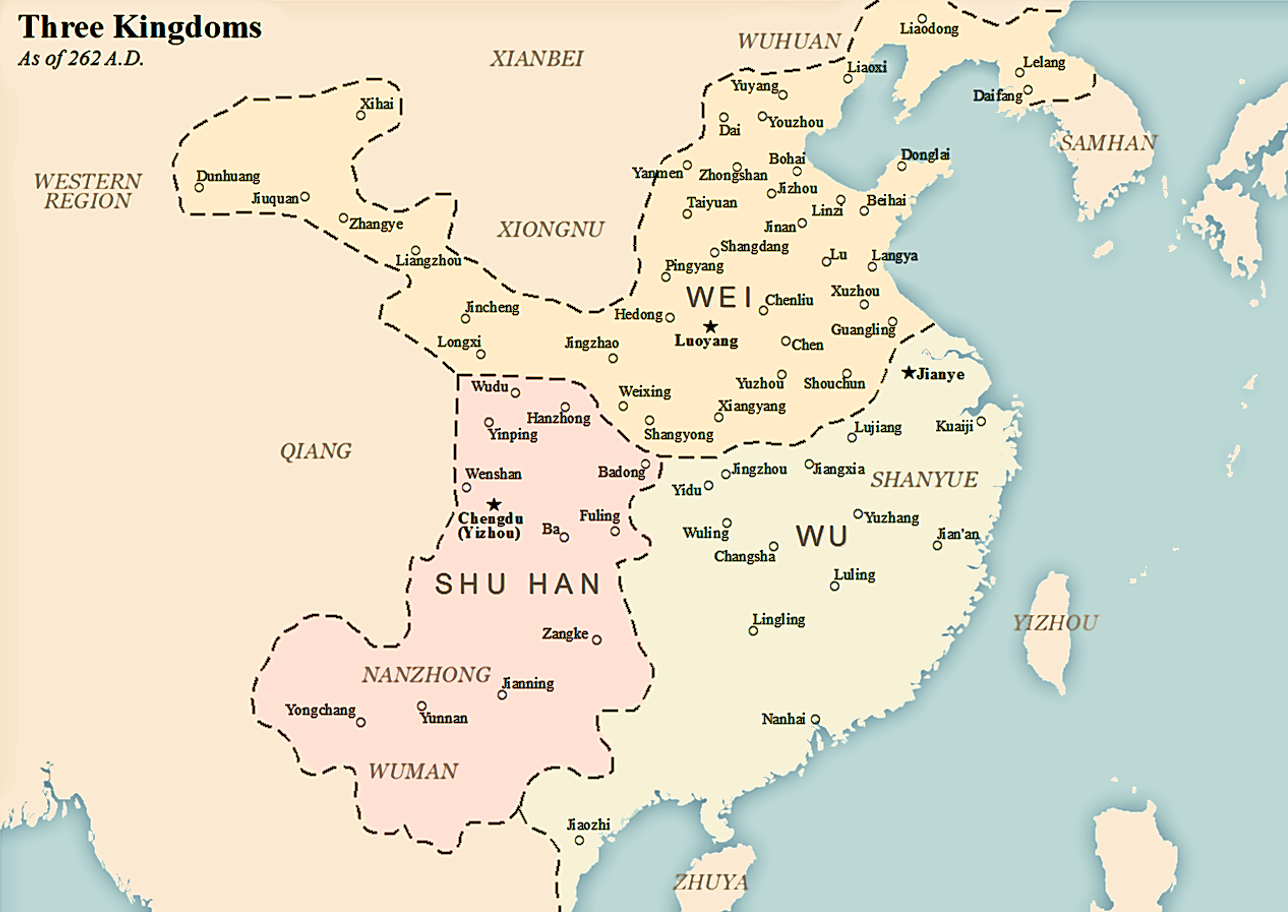
The Three Kingdoms in 262 AD

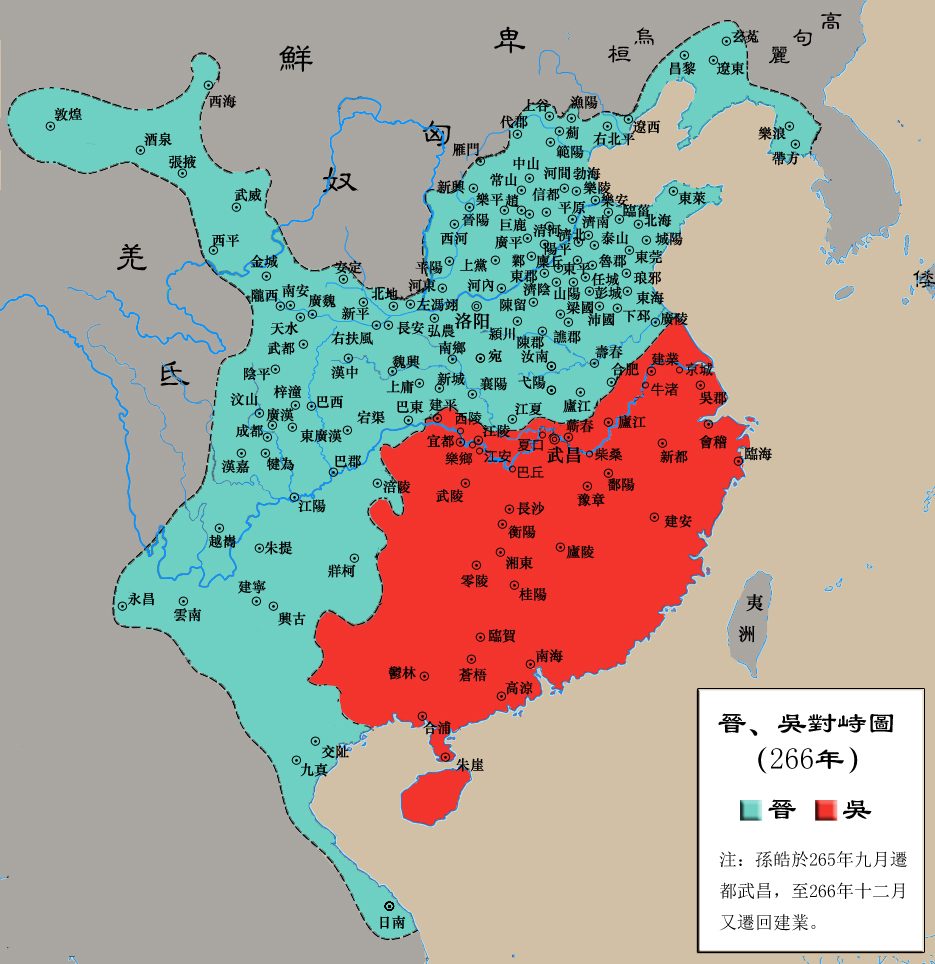
China in 266

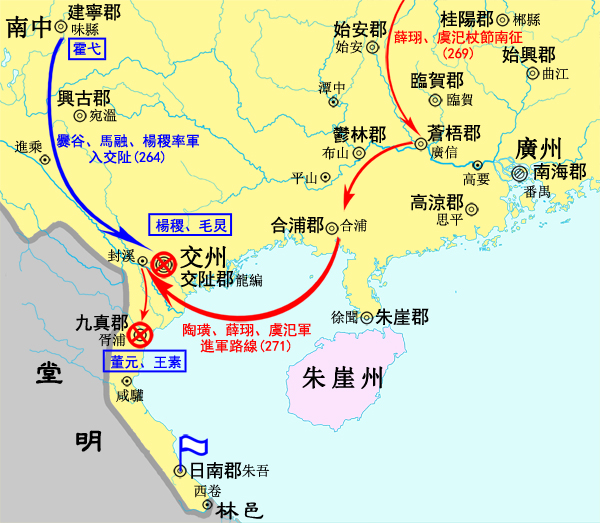
War in Northern Vietnam, 263–280 AD

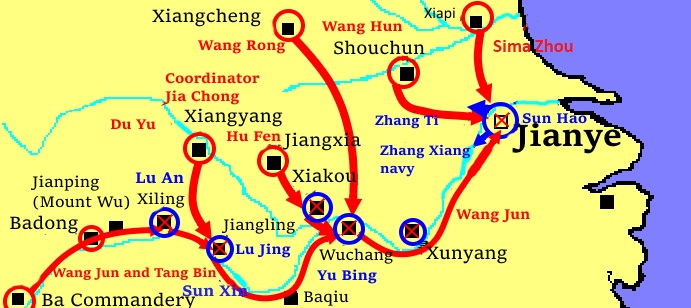
Conquest of Wu by Jin in 280

== Bibliography ==
- Crespigny, Rafe (2007), A Biographical Dictionary of Later Han to the Three Kingdoms (23-220 AD), Brill
- Knapp, Ronald G. (1980), China's Island Frontier: Studies in the Historical Geography of Taiwan, The University of Hawaii
- Kiernan, Ben (2019). Việt Nam: a history from earliest time to the present. Oxford University Press. ISBN 9780190053796.
- Shin, Michael D. (2014), Korean History in Maps, Cambridge University Press
- Xiong, Victor Cunrui (2009), Historical Dictionary of Medieval China, United States of America: Scarecrow Press, Inc., ISBN 978-0810860537
