= Battle of Hefei =

The Battle of Hefei may refer to:

- Battle of Hefei (208), fought between Sun Quan and Cao Cao
- Battle of Xiaoyao Ford, also known as the Battle of Hefei, fought between Sun Quan and Cao Cao between 214 and 215
- Battle of Hefei (231), fought between Eastern Wu and Cao Wei
- Battle of Hefei (233), fought between Eastern Wu and Cao Wei
- Battle of Hefei (234), also known as Battle of Xincheng, Hefei, fought between Eastern Wu and Cao Wei
- Battle of Hefei (253), also known as Battle of Xincheng, Hefei, fought between Eastern Wu and Cao Wei
