= Zhong Yao =

Chinese official and calligrapher (151-230)

- 鍾繇
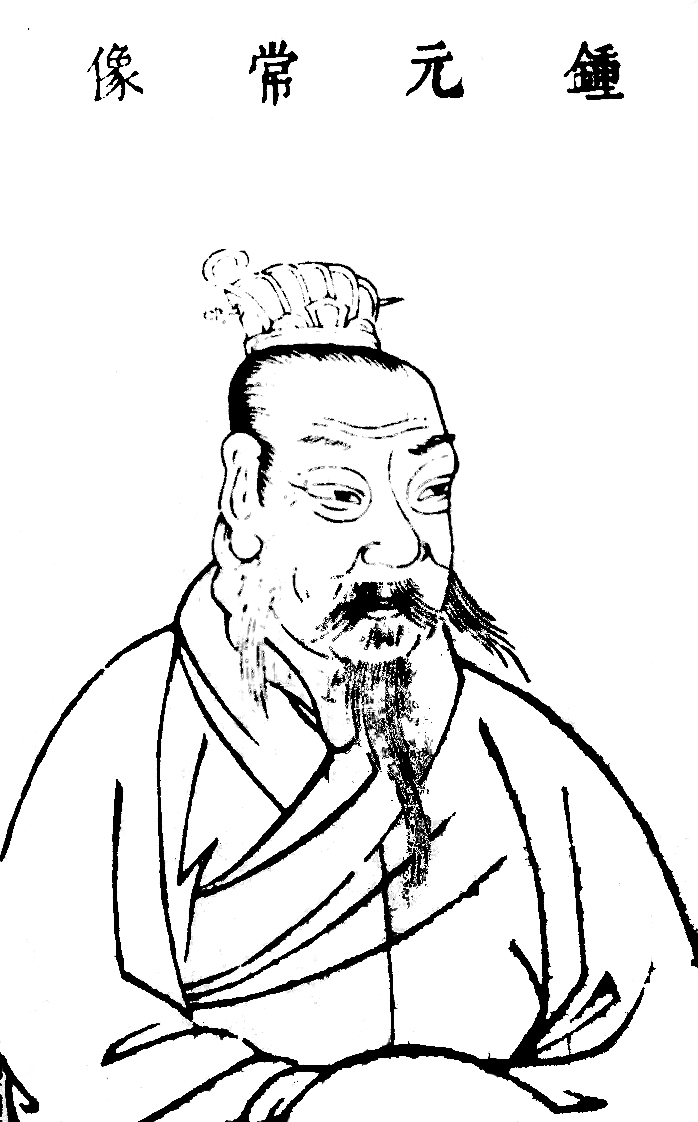
- Portrait of Zhong Yao in the Sancai Tuhui

Grand Tutor (太傅)
- In office January or February 227 – April or May 230
- Monarch: Cao Rui
- Succeeded by: Sima Yi

Grand Commandant (太尉)
- In office 23 September 223 – January or February 227
- Monarch: Cao Pi/Cao Rui

Minister of Justice (廷尉)
- In office 220 – 23 September 223
- Monarch: Cao Pi

Chancellor of State (相國) (in Cao Cao's vassal dukedom/kingdom)
- In office ? – c.October 219
- Monarch: Emperor Xian of Han
- Chancellor: Cao Cao
- Succeeded by: Hua Xin

Grand Judge (大理) (in Cao Cao's vassal dukedom) (Note: Cao Cao was appointed Duke of Wei in 213, then Prince of Wei in 216.)
- In office 213–?
- Monarch: Emperor Xian of Han
- Chancellor: Cao Cao

Personal details
- Born: 151 Changge, Henan
- Died: April or May 230 (aged 79) (Note: Cao Rui's biography in the Sanguozhi recorded that Zhong Yao died in the 4th month of the 4th year of the Taihe era of Cao Rui's reign. This month corresponds to 30 April to 29 May 230 in the Gregorian calendar. When annotating Xun You's biography in Sanguozhi, Pei Songzhi indicated that Zhong Yao was 80 (by East Asian reckoning) when he died. Shu Duan also recorded that Zhong was 80 (by East Asian reckoning) when he died.) Luoyang, Henan
- Spouses: Lady Sun; Lady Jia; Zhang Changpu
- Relations: Zhong Yan (brother); Guo Yuan (nephew); Xun Xu (grandnephew)
- Children: Zhong Yu (died late 263) (Note: Zhong Yu's biography in Sanguozhi recorded that he died in the 4th year of the Jingyuan era of Cao Huan's reign, while Zhong Hui's biography in the same work recorded that he died in the winter of that year; the 10th to 12th months of that year correspond to 18 Nov 263 to 14 Feb 264 in the Julian calendar. Yu's biography also implied that he was at least 14 (by East Asian reckoning) by the early part of the Taihe era (227–233) of Cao Rui's reign.); Zhong Hui
- Parent: Zhong Di (Note: However, the Xianxian Xingzhuang (〈《先贤行状》) recorded that Zhong Di was Zhong Yao's grandfather. The Zizhi Tongjian recorded that Zhong Yao was Zhong Hao's great-grandson.) (father)
- Occupation: Calligrapher, politician
- Courtesy name: Yuanchang (元常)
- Posthumous name: Marquis Cheng (成侯)
- Peerage: Marquis of Dingling (定陵侯)

Zhong Yao (鍾繇, 151 – April or May 230), also referred to as Zhong You, (Note: The name is also rendered Zhōng Yóu in pinyin, because the second character has two common pronunciations. In the Norman & Mattos translation of Qiu Xigui (2000), for instance, Zhōng Yóu is given. However, according to the Hanyu Da Zidian's entry on the character (p. 1436), it is pronounced yáo when used as a name.) courtesy name Yuanchang (元常), was a Chinese calligrapher and politician who lived during the late Eastern Han dynasty and Three Kingdoms period of China. He served in the state of Cao Wei during the Three Kingdoms period. His calligraphy was highly regarded as he was known as one of the Four Worthies of Calligraphy (書中四賢) in the history of Chinese calligraphy.

== Life ==
=== Service under Cao Cao ===
In 202, when Cao Cao led his forces to attack Yuan Shang and his brother Yuan Tan at the Battle of Liyang, Yuan Shang ordered Gao Gan, Guo Yuan and Huchuquan to lead troops to attack Hedong Commandery (河東郡; around present-day Xia County, Shanxi), which was guarded by Jia Kui, an official under Cao Cao. Jia Kui could not hold up against the attack, so the people in Hedong Commandery offered to surrender to Guo Yuan on the condition that he would not harm Jia Kui. Guo Yuan agreed and captured Hedong Commandery, after which Yuan Shang appointed him as the commandery's Administrator (太守). When Jia Kui refused to surrender to Guo Yuan, the latter wanted to kill him but the people of Hedong Commandery helped Jia Kui escape.

In the meantime, Cao Cao ordered Zhong Yao to recruit forces from Liang Province to deal with Guo Yuan and Gao Gan. Ma Teng, a warlord in Liang Province, responded to Zhong Yao's call (Note: Zhong had sent Zhang Ji to liaise with Ma.) and sent his son Ma Chao and an officer Pang De to assist Zhong Yao in attacking Guo Yuan and Gao Gan at Pingyang County (平陽縣; west of present-day Linfen, Shanxi). Pang De led the vanguard, slew Guo Yuan in the midst of battle and took his head, without knowing that the man he killed was Guo Yuan. After the battle, when Zhong Yao's men searched the battlefield, they found Guo Yuan's headless body. Shortly after, Pang De went to meet Zhong Yao and he threw Guo Yuan's head in front of him. Zhong Yao cried when he recognised Guo Yuan's head because Guo Yuan was his maternal nephew. Pang De immediately apologised to Zhong Yao, who replied, "Even though Guo Yuan was my nephew, he was an enemy of the state. Why do you apologise?"

In April 211, Cao Cao ordered Zhong Yao to lead an army against the warlord Zhang Lu in Hanzhong Commandery and sent Xiahou Yuan at the head of another force from Hedong Commandery to support Zhong.

When Cao Cao was appointed Duke of Wei in 213 and then Prince of Wei in 216, Zhong was first appointed Grand Judge (大理) and then Chancellor (相國) of Cao Cao's vassal dukedom/kingdom. In the aftermath of Wei Feng's rebellion in 219, Zhong was relieved of his Chancellor post and sent home.

=== Service under Cao Wei ===
Following Cao Pi's establishment of Cao Wei in late 220, Zhong was first appointed Minister of Justice; he was then appointed Grand Commandant on 23 September 223. His initial peerage was Marquis of Chonggao Village, which was later changed to Marquis of Pingyang Village. Cao Pi was proud of his Three Ducal Ministers: Zhong Yao was Grand Commandant, Hua Xin was Minister over the Masses while Wang Lang was Minister of Works. Once, after a court session was dismissed, Cao Pi said to those around him, "These three Ducal Ministers were great men of their generation; future generations can hardly hope to continue their legacies!"

Following Cao Pi's death and Cao Rui taking the throne, Zhong Yao was appointed as the Grand Tutor (太傅) of Wei in c.January 227; he remained in this post until his death in 230.

=== Calligraphy ===
As a student of Cai Yong, a famous calligrapher and intellectual, he also contributed to the development of standard script (kaishu), and is known as the "father of standard script". His famous works include the Xuanshi Biao (宣示表; Xuānshì Biǎo), Jianjizhi Biao (荐季直表; 薦季直表; Jiànjìzhí Biǎo), and Liming Biao (力命表; Lìmìng Biǎo), which survive through handwritten copies, including by Wang Xizhi. Qiu Xigui (2000, p. 143) describes the script in Zhong's Xuanshi Biao as:

"... clearly emerging from the womb of early period semi-cursive script. If one were to write the tidily written variety of early period semi-cursive script in a more dignified fashion and were to use consistently the pause technique (dùn 頓; used to reinforce the beginning or ending of a stroke) when ending horizontal strokes, a practice which already appears in early period semi-cursive script, and further were to make use of right-falling strokes with thick feet, the result would be a style of calligraphy like that in the "Xuanshi Biao"".

According to Hu Zhao's biography in Records of the Three Kingdoms by Chen Shou, Zhong Yao's calligraphy was widely emulated by contemporaries, alongside those of Hu, Handan Chun, Wei Ji (卫觊), (Note: father of Wei Guan) and Wei Dan (Note: brother of Wei Kang) (韦诞).

== Anecdotes ==
After Zhu Jianping became friends with Zhong Yao and Xun You, the pair asked Zhu for a reading together. The prediction warned that though Xun You was younger, (Note: Zhong Yao was born in 151, while Xun You was born in 157.) Zhong Yao would be the one left caring for Xun You's household. Zhong Yao joked that all he would do was to arrange a marriage for Xun You's concubine, but after Xun You died in 214, Zhong Yao was left reflecting on the joke as he indeed looked for a marriage for the concubine. Zhong Yao wrote that Zhu Jianping's skill was greater than figures of the past like the Warring States physiognomist Tang Ju and former Han diviner Xu Fu.

Zhong Yao also once said of Xun You, "Every time I plan something, I'll carefully think through it again and again until I'm certain that I can't make any more changes. However, after consulting Gongda, (Note: Xun You's courtesy name) he always has new insights to offer." Xun You created 12 strategies for Zhong Yao. Zhong Yao died before he managed to finish writing a book about the 12 strategies, hence some of them were lost. The historian Pei Songzhi thought it was a huge pity that Xun You's strategies were lost because Zhong Yao died at the age of 79 – some 16 years after Xun You's death – so he probably should have had ample time to finish writing the book.

== Family ==
Zhong Yao's grandfather/ great-grandfather, Zhong Hao (鍾皓), was a prominent scholar in the Eastern Han dynasty; the mother of Zhong Hao's paternal nephew Zhong Jin (鍾瑾; son of an elder brother of Zhong Hao) was a paternal aunt of Li Ying. Zhong Yao's father/grandfather, Zhong Di (鍾迪), refused to enter politics because of the Disasters of the Partisan Prohibitions. Zhong Yao had two known siblings: a brother, Zhong Yan (鍾演), who received a marquis title, and a sister, who was the mother of Guo Yuan.

Zhong Yao had at least three spouses. The first, Lady Sun (孫氏), was known for being jealous of his other concubines and for seeking to harm them or make them fall out of his favour. Zhong Yao divorced her after he discovered that she tried to poison Zhang Changpu, a then-pregnant concubine. The royal family of Cao Wei tried to intervene the divorce but failed as Zhong Yao attempted to harm himself as an action of protest. He married Lady Jia (賈氏), the second spouse, as his formal wife after he divorced Lady Sun. Zhang Changpu maintained her status as a concubine up to her death.

Zhong Yao had at least two sons. The elder one, Zhong Yu (鍾毓), served as the Minister of Justice (廷尉) and General of Chariots and Cavalry (車騎將軍) in the Wei government. The younger one, Zhong Hui, was born to Zhang Changpu. He also served as a general in the Wei government and is best known for his role in the Wei conquest of Shu Han, one of Wei's rival states, in 263. However, he launched a rebellion in 264 against the Wei regent Sima Zhao, but failed and was killed by his soldiers, who started a mutiny against him.

Zhong Yu had four sons: Zhong Jun (鍾峻), Zhong Yong (鍾邕), Zhong Yi (鍾毅) and Zhong Chan (鍾辿). Zhong Yi was raised as Zhong Hui's adoptive son because Zhong Hui was single and had no children. Zhong Yong was killed along with his uncle Zhong Hui during the mutiny and his family members were executed. In the aftermath of Zhong Hui's failed rebellion, Zhong Jun, Zhong Yi and Zhong Chan were implicated, arrested and placed on death row for their relations to Zhong Hui. However, Sima Zhao took into consideration that Zhong Yao and Zhong Yu had rendered meritorious service to Wei, hence he decided to let them preserve their posterity. He made the Wei emperor Cao Huan issue an imperial decree, which pardoned Zhong Jun and Zhong Chan and restored them to their original official positions and titles. Zhong Yi, however, was executed because he was Zhong Hui's adoptive son and was hence not eligible for the pardon.

Wang Hun's wife Zhong Yan (Note: Lady Zhong has a biography in vol.96 of Jin Shu; this biography recorded that "Yan" (琰) was her courtesy name and that she was Zhong Yao's great-granddaughter. Vol.517 of Taiping Yulan, citing another Jin Shu, recorded that "Yan" was Lady Zhong's name and that she was Yao's granddaughter; a Wang Shi Pu annotation in A New Account of the Tales of the World recorded that her name was "Yanzhi" and that she was Yao's granddaughter.) was either Yao's granddaughter or great-granddaughter.

== See also ==
- Lists of people of the Three Kingdoms
