= Jia Kui (general) =

Cao Wei general and politician (174-228)

- 賈逵

General Who Establishes Might (建威將軍)
- In office 222 – 228
- Monarchs: Cao Pi, Cao Rui

Inspector of Yu Province (豫州刺史)
- In office 220 – 222
- Monarch: Cao Pi

Administrator of Wei Commandery (魏郡太守)
- In office 220
- Monarch: Cao Pi

Personal details
- Born: 174 Xiangfen County, Shanxi
- Died: c.October 228 (aged 54) (Note: The Wei Shu recorded that Jia Kui was 55 years old (by East Asian age reckoning) when he died.)
- Spouse: Lady Liu
- Children: Jia Chong; Jia Hun
- Occupation: Military general, politician
- Courtesy name: Liangdao (梁道)
- Posthumous name: Marquis Su (肅侯)
- Peerage: Marquis of Yangli Village (陽里亭侯)
- Original name: Jia Qu (賈衢)

Jia Kui (174 – c.October 228 (Note: Sun Quan's biography in the Sanguozhi indicated that Lu Xun defeated Cao Xiu at Shi'ting in the 8th month of the 7th year of the Huangwu era of his reign. The month corresponds to 17 Sep to 15 Oct 228 in the Julian calendar. Jia Kui's biography in the Sanguozhi indicated that he died shortly after the battle. Thus, Jia Kui likely died in Oct 228.)), originally named Jia Qu, courtesy name Liangdao, was a Chinese military general and politician who lived during the late Eastern Han dynasty of China. He served under the state of Cao Wei during the Three Kingdoms period.

== Life ==
Jia Kui was from Xiangling County (襄陵縣), Hedong Commandery (河東郡), which is present-day Xiangfen County, Shanxi.

In 202, when Cao Cao led his forces to attack Yuan Shang and his brother Yuan Tan at the Battle of Liyang, Yuan Shang ordered Gao Gan, Guo Yuan and Huchuquan to lead troops to attack Hedong Commandery (河東郡; around present-day Xia County, Shanxi), which was guarded by Jia Kui. Jia Kui could not hold up against the attack, so the people in Hedong Commandery offered to surrender to Guo Yuan on the condition that he would not harm Jia Kui. Guo Yuan agreed and captured Hedong Commandery, after which Yuan Shang appointed him as the commandery's Administrator (太守). When Jia Kui refused to surrender to Guo Yuan, the latter wanted to kill him but the people of Hedong Commandery helped to intercede on Jia Kui's behalf; he was eventually spared.

After appointments to several posts as prefect, administrator and Registrar to the Imperial Chancellor, Jia Kui was enfeoffed as a Secondary Marquis for his work in keeping his jurisdictions prepared for battle and well-supplied.

In March 220, after Cao Cao's death, Jia Kui was in charge of arranging Cao Cao's funeral, along with Sima Yi. (Note: Sima Yi's biography in Jin Shu and Jia Kui's biography in Sanguozhi both recorded that they were in charge of Cao Cao's funeral, without mentioning the other party.) Cao's son Cao Zhang then asked Jia about Cao Cao's seal. Jia firmly rebuked Cao Zhang," The Taizi is at Ye, and the state has a successor. The seal of the late King, is not something you should be asking about."

During a skirmish with enemy forces from Cao Wei's rival state Eastern Wu during Cao Pi's reign, Jia Kui defeated the Wu general Lü Fan and earned further accolades.

In 228, during Cao Rui's reign, Jia Kui and Cao Xiu were put in command of an army to invade Wu. This led to the Battle of Shiting. Cao Xiu fell for a ruse by the Wu general Zhou Fang, who pretended to defect to the Wei side. However, Jia Kui found Zhou Fang's defection suspicious and maintained his guard. Although the Wu forces won the battle, Jia Kui managed to save Cao Xiu after his defeat and protect him while he retreated. Jia Kui died shortly after the battle.

== Family ==
Jia Kui's son, Jia Chong, was a close aide to the Wei regent Sima Zhao. He continued serving as an official under the Jin dynasty (founded by Sima Zhao's son Sima Yan) after the end of the Three Kingdoms period, and was enfeoffed as the Duke of Lu after the Jin dynasty was established. Jia Chong's daughter Jia Nanfeng married the crown prince Sima Zhong, the future Emperor Hui of Jin.

== See also ==
- Lists of people of the Three Kingdoms
