= Guo Yuan (Yuan Shang's subordinate) =

Official serving warlord Yuan Shang (died 202)

- 郭援

Administrator of Hedong (河東太守)
- In office 202
- Monarch: Emperor Xian of Han

Personal details
- Born: Unknown
- Died: 202 Linfen, Shanxi
- Relations: Zhong Yao (maternal uncle)
- Occupation: Military general, politician

Guo Yuan (died 202) was a Chinese military general and politician serving under the warlord Yuan Shang in the late Eastern Han dynasty of China.

== Life ==
Guo Yuan was a maternal nephew of Zhong Yao. He was a subordinate of the warlord Yuan Shang. In 202, when the warlord Cao Cao led his forces to attack Yuan Shang and his brother Yuan Tan at the Battle of Liyang, Yuan Shang ordered Gao Gan, Guo Yuan and Huchuquan to lead troops to attack Hedong Commandery (河東郡; around present-day Xia County, Shanxi), which was guarded by Jia Kui, an official under Cao Cao. Jia Kui could not hold up against the attack, so the people in Hedong Commandery offered to surrender to Guo Yuan on the condition that he would not harm Jia Kui. Guo Yuan agreed and captured Hedong Commandery, after which Yuan Shang appointed him as the commandery's Administrator (太守). When Jia Kui refused to surrender to Guo Yuan, the latter wanted to kill him but the people of Hedong Commandery helped to intercede on Jia Kui's behalf; he was eventually spared.

In the meantime, Cao Cao ordered Zhong Yao to recruit forces from Liang Province to deal with Guo Yuan and Gao Gan. Ma Teng, a warlord in Liang Province, responded to Zhong Yao's call and sent his son Ma Chao and an officer Pang De to assist Zhong Yao in attacking Guo Yuan and Gao Gan at Pingyang County (平陽縣; west of present-day Linfen, Shanxi). Pang De led the vanguard, slew Guo Yuan in the midst of battle and took his head, without knowing that the man he killed was Guo Yuan. After the battle, when Zhong Yao's men searched the battlefield, they found Guo Yuan's headless body. Shortly after, Pang De went to meet Zhong Yao and he threw Guo Yuan's head in front of him. Zhong Yao cried when he recognised Guo Yuan's head because Guo Yuan was his maternal nephew. Pang De immediately apologised to Zhong Yao, who replied, "Even though Guo Yuan was my nephew, he was an enemy of the state. Why do you apologise?"

== See also ==
- Lists of people of the Three Kingdoms
