= Incident at Guangling =

Conflict between Cao Wei and Wu forces (224–225)

- Part of the wars of the Three Kingdoms period
Date	Late 224 – Early 225
Location	Guangling, on the northern bank of the estuary opposite present-day Nanjing.
Result	Wei retreat

Belligerents
Cao Wei	Eastern Wu

Commanders and leaders
Cao Pi	Sun Quan; Xu Sheng

Strength
100,000+	

The Incident at Guangling was a military confrontation that took place from late 224 to early 225 between the state of Cao Wei and the kingdom of Wu during the Three Kingdoms period of China. Although the conflict was considered a naval battle, no fighting officially occurred. This would ultimately prove to be the final military campaign that Cao Pi participated in before his death in June of 226.

== Background ==
In 222, the Wei emperor Cao Pi demanded that Sun Quan, who in 220 became a vassal king paying nominal allegiance to Wei, send his son Sun Deng as a hostage to Wei to further secure Sun Quan's allegiance towards him. However, Sun Quan refused, broke ties with Wei, and became the independent ruler of his Wu kingdom. In retaliation, Cao Pi ordered a series of invasions of Wu between 222 and 224, but each invasion ultimately ended in failure. In late 224, Cao Pi mobilised over 100,000 troops from throughout Wei and ordered them to assemble at Guangling Commandery (廣陵郡; around present-day Huai'an, Jiangsu) in preparation for a massive invasion of the Wu capital, Jianye (present-day Nanjing, Jiangsu).

== The advance ==
Cao Pi knew that the invasion would fail if he launched attacks from upstream of the Yangtze, where the river was narrow. Therefore, he chose to stage the invasion from Guangling Commandery, where the river was wider. Earlier that year, the Wu general Xu Sheng had ordered the construction of a whole stash of dummy defence walls and turrets along the southern bank of the Yangtze from Jianye downstream to Jiangcheng in preparation for a naval attack by Wei forces.

In the winter of 224–225, Cao Pi ordered his troops to destroy the blockading walls and personally led the 100,000 strong Wei fleet as they set sail on the Yangtze. In response to the impending Wei invasion, Sun Quan sent a large naval fleet to block the enemy. Despite the size of the Wu fleet, Cao Pi was actually more worried about the climate and its effects on the Wei fleet. It was a harsh winter so the Wei navy would have a hard time advancing. After seeing the Wu defences and the conditions of his fleet, Cao Pi sighed, "Alas! It is truly the will of Heaven which divides the south from the north." He then ordered his troops to retreat from Guangling Commandery. When the Wu general Sun Shao heard about the Wei retreat, he ordered his subordinate Gao Shou (高壽) to lead 500 men to launch a surprise night raid on the enemy. The retreating Wei forces were caught off guard by the raid; Gao Shou and his men even captured and made off with the parasol of Cao Pi's chariot.

== Aftermath ==
Cao Pi died in June of 226 and was succeeded by his son, Cao Rui, as the new Wei emperor. In 228, Cao Rui ordered the general Cao Xiu to lead another invasion of Wu which led to the Battle of Shiting. Cao Xiu lost the battle after falling for a ruse by the Wu general Zhou Fang, who pretended to defect to Wei and lured the Wei forces into an ambush. In the subsequent 24 years, the Wei forces switched from their offensive approach to a defensive one, and succeeded in repelling a number of Wu invasions. After losing the Battle of Dongxing in 252, Wei never managed to make any territorial gains south of the Yangtze. In 280, the Jin dynasty (which had replaced Wei in 265) launched a large-scale invasion of Wu that finally succeeded in eliminating Wu, thus unifying China under the Jin dynasty.

== In fiction ==
The incident is included in the eighth instalment of the Dynasty Warriors franchise. However, the incident is foretold as a battle, which defies the fact that no violence occurred during the historical incident.
