= Yan Xiang (Han dynasty) =

Chinese politician and official (163–200)

- 嚴象

Inspector of Yang Province (揚州刺史)
- In office 199 – 200
- Monarch: Emperor Xian of Han
- Succeeded by: Liu Fu

Personal details
- Born: 163; Xi'an, Shaanxi
- Died: 200 (aged 37); Anhui
- Occupation: Official
- Courtesy name: Wenze (文則)

Yan Xiang (嚴象; 163–200), courtesy name Wenze, was an official who lived during the late Eastern Han dynasty of China. A similarly named Yan Xiang (閻象) also served under the warlord Yuan Shu as a registrar. Although it is not clear whether they were the same person, the historian Rafe de Crespigny mentioned that it could be assumed that Yan Xiang left Yuan Shu and defected to the Han central government, which was then under the leadership of the warlord Cao Cao.

== Yan Xiang (嚴象) ==
Yan Xiang was from Jingzhao (京兆; around present-day Xi'an, Shaanxi). At a young age, he was already known for being intelligent, knowledgeable and courageous. Through Xun Yu's recommendation, he joined the civil service and served as a Palace Assistant Imperial Clerk (御史中丞). In 197, he was concurrently appointed as an Army Inspector (督軍) and participated in a punitive campaign against the warlord Yuan Shu, who had declared himself emperor – an act regarded as treason against Emperor Xian, the nominal ruler of the Han Empire. After Yuan Shu's death in 199, Yan Xiang served as the Inspector (刺史) of Yang Province.

Acting on the instruction of Cao Cao, the warlord who controlled the Han central government, Yan Xiang nominated Sun Quan as a maocai (茂才). In 200 CE, Li Shu (李術), the Administrator (太守) of Lujiang Commandery (廬江郡), killed Yan Xiang. Yan Xiang was 38 years old (by East Asian age reckoning) when he died. Zhao Qi (趙岐), a writer who, like Yan Xiang, was also from Jingzhao, wrote a book called Sanfu Juelu (三輔決錄). Zhao Qi was worried that people might not be receptive to his book so he did not publicly release it and instead showed it to only Yan Xiang.

== Yan Xiang (閻象) ==
A similarly named Yan Xiang also served under Yuan Shu as a Registrar (主簿). When Yuan Shu wanted to declare himself emperor in the late 190s, Yan Xiang advised him against it. Yan Xiang quoted a past example of the noble Ji Chang, who controlled two-thirds of the Shang dynasty's territory but still refrained from seizing the throne from King Zhou. Yuan Shu did not heed his advice.

== See also ==
- Lists of people of the Three Kingdoms
