= Battle of Hefei (208) =

Battle between warlords Cao Cao and Sun Quan (208-209)

Coordinates: 31.8667°N 117.2833°E

- Part of the Red Cliffs campaign
Date	208–209
Location	Hefei, Anhui, China
Result	Inconclusive; Sun Quan retreat

Belligerents
Cao Cao	Sun Quan

Commanders and leaders
Liu Fu; Jiang Ji	Sun Quan, Zhang Zhao; Zhang Hong

Strength
Unknown, probably slightly superior to Sun's forces	20,000–30,000 (Assuming Sun Quan took minimal casualties at the battle of Red Cliffs)

Battle of Hefei
- Traditional Chinese: 合肥之戰
- Simplified Chinese: 合肥之战
Transcriptions
Standard Mandarin
- Hanyu Pinyin: Héféi Zhī Zhàn

The Battle of Hefei was fought between the warlords Cao Cao and Sun Quan between late 208 and early 209 in the late Eastern Han dynasty.

== Background ==
In the winter of 208–209, Cao Cao was defeated by Sun Quan and Liu Bei at the Battle of Red Cliffs, but he still had a large army garrisoned at the northern part of Jing Province (covering present-day Hubei and Hunan). The following month, Sun Quan's general Zhou Yu led an attack on Jiangling (江陵; located in present-day Jingjiang 荆江, not to be confused with Jiangling County, Hubei), which was defended by Cao Cao's cousin Cao Ren.

== The battle ==
At the same time, Sun Quan personally led an assault on Cao Cao's fortress at Hefei, which was defended by Liu Fu, in an attempt to open two war fronts in the west and north. Sun Quan also sent Zhang Zhao to attack Dangtu (當塗), Jiujiang (九江) commandery, but was unsuccessful.

When Cao Cao heard news of the attack, he sent Zhang Xi (張喜) to lead an army to reinforce Hefei. The battle dragged on until the following year, but Sun Quan's forces were unable to breach Hefei. Sun Quan intended to personally lead a light cavalry contingent on a charge at the enemy, but Zhang Hong advised him against it, "Using the military is an offensive move, battles are dangerous. Now that our army's morale is high, if we suddenly launch a fierce attack, the troops will be disappointed. Even though it is possible to slay enemy generals, capture their flags and instil fear in them, this is a mission to be carried out by a subordinate general, and not the commander-in-chief. I hope you can control your zeal and courage, and possess the strategies of a conqueror-king." Sun Quan heeded Zhang Hong's advice and aborted his plan.

As Hefei had been constantly under attack for several months, compounded by heavy rain, the fortress' walls were starting to collapse, so Liu Fu ordered his men to use straw and palm leaves to cover up cracks in the walls. At night, Liu Fu had torches lit to brighten the scene outside Hefei, so he could observe the enemy's movements and prepare defences. Zhang Xi's relief force had yet to arrive, and Liu Fu was at a loss on how to resist the enemy. Liu Fu's deputy Jiang Ji suggested using a strategy to deceive the enemy that Hefei's reinforcements had arrived: spread false news that Zhang Xi's 40,000 strong relief army had reached Yulou (雩婁); send an official to pretend to receive Zhang Xi; send three officers to bring fake letters out of Hefei. Only one of the three officers returned to the fortress as the other two were captured by Sun Quan's men, who found the letters on them. Sun Quan read the letters and thought that Zhang Xi's reinforcements had indeed arrived, so he ordered his troops to burn down the camp and hastily retreat.

== Order of battle ==
Cao Cao forces

- Inspector of Yang Province (揚州刺史) Liu Fu, was in charge of Hefei until the end of 208.
  - Attendant Officer of Yang Province (揚州別駕) Jiang Ji, was in charge of Hefei from the end of 208 until Sun Quan's withdrawal.
- General Zhang Xi (張喜), led 1,000 troops to reinforce Hefei.

Sun Quan forces

- General Who Exterminates Barbarians (破虜將軍) Sun Quan, led an attack on Hefei from Chaisang.
  - Chief Clerk (長史) Zhang Zhao, led an attack on Dangtu.
  - Chief Clerk (長史) Zhang Hong, served as Sun Quan's deputy during the attack on Hefei.

== In Romance of the Three Kingdoms ==
In chapter 53 of the 14th-century historical novel Romance of the Three Kingdoms, Sun Quan's general Taishi Ci was killed in the battle. Taishi Ci proposed a strategy involving a man named Ge Ding (戈定), who was from the same hometown as him. Ge Ding and a defector from Hefei would assassinate Zhang Liao (Cao Cao's general who was defending Hefei) and open the city gates for Sun Quan's army. That night, Ge Ding and the defector started a fire in the city to create chaos, but they were caught and executed. Zhang Liao recognised the enemy's plot and decided to turn it against them, so he set up an ambush and opened the gates to lure the enemy in. Outside Hefei, Taishi Ci saw the fire and thought that it was a signal from Ge Ding, indicating that he had succeeded and opened the gates for him. Taishi Ci charged into the city, but fell into the ambush and was hit by several arrows. At that moment, enemy forces led by Li Dian and Yue Jin attacked Taishi Ci from behind. Taishi Ci narrowly escaped under the protection of Dong Xi, but later died from his wounds in camp at the age of 41.

Historicity

No details on Taishi Ci's death were provided in historical records. Taishi Ci's biography in the Records of the Three Kingdoms simply mentioned that he died at the age of 41 (by East Asian age reckoning) in the 11th year of Jian'an (corresponds to 206), around two years before this battle took place.
