= Liu Fu (Yuanying) =

Eastern Han dynasty politician (died 208)

- 劉馥

Inspector of Yang Province (揚州刺史)
- In office 200 – 208
- Monarch: Emperor Xian of Han
- Preceded by: Yan Xiang

Personal details
- Born: Unknown; Huaibei, Anhui
- Died: 208
- Children: Liu Jing
- Occupation: Politician
- Courtesy name: Yuanying (元穎)

Liu Fu (died 208), courtesy name Yuanying, was a Chinese politician of the Eastern Han dynasty of China. While serving as the governor of Yang Province from 200 to 208, he relocated the province's administrative centre from Liyang (歷陽; present-day He County, Anhui) to Hefei. During his tenure, Hefei became a highly militarised and well-defended military stronghold, which later served as a strategic location in several battles between the rival states of Cao Wei and Eastern Wu during the Three Kingdoms period (220–280).

== Life ==
Liu Fu was from Xiang County (相縣), Pei State (沛國), which is located west of present-day Huaibei, Anhui. When chaos broke out throughout China towards the end of the Eastern Han dynasty, he fled from his hometown and took shelter in Yang Province.

In the early Jian'an era (196–220) of Emperor Xian's reign, he met Qi Ji (戚寄) and Qin Yi, two military officers serving under the warlord Yuan Shu, who was based in Huainan (淮南; around present-day Shou County, Anhui). He managed to convince them to leave Yuan Shu and bring along their troops to defect to Cao Cao, the warlord who controlled the figurehead Emperor Xian and the Han central government in Xu (許; present-day Xuchang, Henan). Cao Cao was so pleased with Liu Fu that he appointed him as an assistant official under the Minister over the Masses (司徒) in the central government.

In the year 200, the warlord Sun Ce, who controlled the Jiangdong region, ordered Li Shu (李術), the Administrator of Lujiang Commandery (廬江郡; around present-day Lu'an, Anhui), to attack and kill Yan Xiang, the Inspector (刺史; provincial governor) of Yang Province appointed by the central government. At the same time, Mei Qian (梅乾), Lei Xu (雷緒) and Chen Lan (陳蘭) had amassed thousands of bandits in Huainan and posed a threat to the central government's control over the region. Around the time, the various counties and commanderies in Yang Province were in ruins as they had seen years of war between rival warlords fighting for control over Huainan.

In the same year, Cao Cao was at war with his rival, Yuan Shao, at the Battle of Guandu so he was unable to deal with the threats in the Huainan region. However, he believed that Liu Fu was capable of accomplishing that task so he nominated Liu Fu to serve as the new Inspector of Yang Province.

Upon assuming office, Liu Fu ordered the construction of a city at Hefei, which became the new administrative centre of Yang Province. At the same time, through exchanging gifts, he managed to persuade the local bandit forces to accept some measure of his authority. They helped him restore order and stability in Huainan, and pledged allegiance and paid tribute to the central government. Liu Fu governed Yang Province with benevolence and enjoyed high popularity among the locals. Thousands of residents who previously fled from Yang Province to evade chaos returned to their homes. As the population increased, Liu Fu had more schools built, implemented the tuntian system, and promoted agriculture and irrigation. His efforts led to a surplus of resources for both the local government and the common people. He also oversaw the construction of defence infrastructure and the stockpiling of military supplies in preparation for war.

Liu Fu died in the year 208.

== In Romance of the Three Kingdoms ==
In the 14th-century historical novel Romance of the Three Kingdoms, before the Battle of Red Cliffs, Cao Cao wrote a poem, Short Song Style, to express his feelings at that time. Liu Fu commented that the following lines in the poem were considered inauspicious:

月明星稀，烏鵲南飛，

繞樹三匝，何枝可依？

Stars around the moons are few,
southward the crows flew.

Flying with no rest,
where shall they nest?

Cao Cao, in his drunken rage, stabbed Liu Fu with his spear and killed him. He regretted his action later when he became sober.

== Family ==
- Son: Liu Jing (劉靖), served in the Eastern Han government and later under the Cao Wei state during the Three Kingdoms period. His highest appointment during service was General who Guards the North (鎮北將軍). He was also enfeoffed as the Marquis of Cheng District (成鄉侯).
- Grandsons:
  - Liu Xi (劉熙), Liu Jing's son, inherited his father's marquis title.
  - Liu Hong (劉弘), Liu Xi's younger brother. During the Western Jin dynasty, he served as Senior General of Chariots and Cavalry (車騎大將軍), Inspector of Jing Province (荊州刺史), and held the peerage of Duke of Xincheng Commandery (新城郡公).
- Great-grandson: Liu Fan (劉璠), Liu Hong's son, served as a North General of the Household (北中郎將) during the Eastern Jin dynasty.

== See also ==
- Lists of people of the Three Kingdoms
