= Battle of Hefei (231) =

Battle between Eastern Wu and Cao Wei in 231

- Part of the wars of the Three Kingdoms period
Date	c.November 231
Location	Hefei, Anhui, China
Result	Cao Wei's strategical victory; Eastern Wu retreated

Belligerents
Cao Wei	Eastern Wu

Commanders and leaders
Man Chong; Wang Ling	Sun Quan; Sun Bu

Casualties and losses
Few	Unknown

Battle of Hefei
- Traditional Chinese: 合肥之戰
- Simplified Chinese: 合肥之战
Transcriptions
Standard Mandarin
- Hanyu Pinyin: Héféi Zhī Zhàn

The Battle of Hefei was fought between the states of Cao Wei and Eastern Wu in 231 during the Three Kingdoms period.

== Background ==
In 230, the state of Wei constructed a new fortress at Hefei as a defence against the rival state of Wu. The fortress was referred to as "Xincheng" (新城; literally: "new city/fortress").

== The battle ==
In the winter of 230, the Wu emperor Sun Quan led an army to attack Xincheng. Man Chong wrote to the Wei emperor Cao Rui seeking soldiers from Yan and Yu provinces to help defend Xincheng. Shortly after the troops arrived, Sun Quan retreated without attacking Xincheng. Man Chong warned that this was their plan all along and that as soon as the troops were dispersed, Sun Quan would attack again. After about ten days, Sun Quan returned to besiege Xincheng but Man Chong was fully prepared and easily repelled the assault.

Later, Sun Quan realised that he could not take Xincheng by force, so he decided that since he had so much success with Zhou Fang's false defection at the Battle of Shiting, he would try that approach again. Sun Quan ordered his relative Sun Bu to pretend to defect to Wei in order to lure the Wei-appointed Governor of Yang Province, Wang Ling, into a trap. Sun Quan set soldiers in ambush at Fuling.

Sun Bu asked Wang Ling to send soldiers to take him to Wei. Wang Ling, in turn, requested permission from his superiors to do so. One of those superiors was Man Chong, who did not believe that Sun Bu's defection was genuine. Man Chong sent a letter (on behalf of Wang Ling) to Sun Bu saying that he was very pleased to hear that Sun Bu wanted to defect. However, he explained that he feared that if he sent too few troops, Sun Bu would not be protected and if he sent too many it would attract undue attention. Finally, in his letter he urged Sun Bu to think of some way to flee from Sun Quan quietly. Meanwhile, Cao Rui summoned Man Chong to meet him. Before leaving to meet the Wei emperor, Man Chong ordered his chief clerk not to give Wang Ling soldiers with which to receive Sun Bu. Wang Ling could not obtain a large number of troops and so sent only a very small force to escort Sun Bu. This small force was ambushed at Fuling and defeated. However, due to Man Chong's foresight, the loss was negligible and Sun Quan's strategy to eliminate the Wei forces based in Hefei failed.

== Aftermath ==
Man Chong was summoned to the Wei imperial court. This was due to a memorial issued by Wang Ling, who evidently did not get along well with his superior. Wang Ling accused Man Chong of being too old and too fond of wine to be such an important administrator. Cao Rui summoned Man Chong so that he could judge for himself. When he met Man Chong, Cao Rui determined that he was perfectly fit for his work and thus allowed Man Chong to resume his duties at Xincheng.
