= Zhang Changpu =

Concubine of Wei minister Zhong Yao (199–257)

Zhang Changpu 張昌蒲
- Born: c. 199; Fenyang, Shanxi
- Died: c.March 257 (aged 58)
- Spouse: Zhong Yao
- Children: Zhong Hui

Zhang Changpu (c. 199 – c.March 257) was a concubine of Zhong Yao, a high minister of the state of Wei in the Three Kingdoms period of China. She was also the mother of Zhong Hui, a Wei general who played a significant role in the conquest of Wei's rival state, Shu, in 263. Her given name was not recorded in history; "Changpu" was actually her courtesy name. According to her biography written by Zhong Hui, she was a strict mother to Zhong Hui and played a significant role in his early education. She was also known for her virtuous conduct and wisdom.

== Background ==
The only extant source on Zhang Changpu's life is a biography of her written by her son, Zhong Hui. In the fifth century, Pei Songzhi incorporated parts of her biography as annotations to her son's biography in the historical text Records of the Three Kingdoms (Sanguozhi), which was written by Chen Shou in the third century.

Zhang Changpu was from Zishi County (茲氏縣), Taiyuan Commandery (太原郡), which is around present-day Fenyang, Shanxi. Her ancestors served as officials under the government of the Han dynasty and had an income of about 2,000 dan (石) of grain. She lost her parents at a young age and was married to Zhong Yao as one of his concubines. She earned praise from the Zhong household for her observance of the proprieties in her behaviour and excellent moral conduct. She was also very much (almost 50 years) younger than Zhong Yao.

== Conflict with Lady Sun ==
Zhong Yao had another concubine, Lady Sun (孫氏), who was very jealous of her husband's other spouses and constantly sought to harm them or make them fall out of her husband's favour. When Zhang Changpu was pregnant with Zhong Hui, Lady Sun attempted to harm her and her unborn child by poisoning her food. However, Zhang Changpu was alert and she vomited out the food when she sensed that there was something wrong with it. Nevertheless, the effects of the poison still caused her to become unconscious for a few days. When she recovered, a servant advised her to tell Zhong Yao about the incident, but she replied:

"Conflict between family members will cause the family to break up. There have been many of such cases in the past. Even if my husband believes me, who else can bear witness to the incident? She (Lady Sun) expects me to tell my husband about the incident, so she will definitely try to preempt me by letting my husband know before I tell him. In doing so, she will end up breaking the news to my husband first. Wouldn't this turn the situation to my advantage?"

She then claimed that she was ill and remained indoors.

As Zhang Changpu predicted, Lady Sun told Zhong Yao: "I wanted her (Zhang Changpu) to have a male child, so I gave her a drug that would increase her chances of becoming pregnant with a male child, yet she accused me of poisoning her!" Zhong Yao said: "It doesn't make sense for you to secretly put into someone's food a drug that would increase a woman's chances of becoming pregnant with a male child" He then summoned the servants, questioned them, and found out the truth. He then asked Zhang Changpu why she did not let him know about Lady Sun's deed, and her reply was the same as her earlier response to the servant. Zhong Yao was greatly surprised and very impressed with Zhang Changpu's virtuous behaviour. Zhang Changpu gave birth to Zhong Hui in 225 and became even more favoured by her husband. Zhong Yao also divorced Lady Sun and made another of his concubines, Lady Jia (賈氏), his formal spouse. Pei Songzhi remarked that Zhong Yao's decision to designate one of his concubines as his formal spouse or wife (even though he was already in his 70s) was in accordance with Confucius's teachings in the Book of Rites. The Weishi Chunqiu mentioned that there was a rumour that Zhong Yao divorced Lady Sun because he favoured Zhang Changpu. Empress Dowager Bian heard the rumour and wanted to know if it was true, so the Wei emperor, Cao Pi, summoned Zhong Yao to ask him. Zhong Yao turned furious and tried to commit suicide by consuming poison but failed, so he consumed spices until his teeth started chattering. Cao Pi then stopped asking him about it.

== Educating Zhong Hui ==
Zhang Changpu was known for being a strict mother to Zhong Hui. She made him read extensively since he was a child and ensured that he was already well versed in the Confucian classics and other books by the time he grew up. When he was four, she made him read the Classic of Filial Piety. When he was seven, she made him read the Analects. When he was eight, she made him read the Classic of Poetry. When he was ten, she made him read the Book of Documents. When he was 11, she made him read the Yijing. When he was 12, she made him read the Spring and Autumn Annals, Zuo Zhuan and Guoyu. When he was 13, she made him read the Book of Rites and Rites of Zhou. When he was 14, she made him read the Yiji (易記) written by his father. When he was 15, she sent him to the Imperial Academy (太學) to learn from a wider range of sources. She once told Zhong Hui: "When you read too much, you become tired of reading. When you become tired of reading, you become lazy. I was worried that you would become lazy, so I decided to make you read in a progressive manner. Now you are able to learn independently." Zhang Changpu herself was also known for being well-read, and she was particularly interested in the Taoist Yijing and Daodejing. She liked to quote Confucius's teachings and use them to educate her son and make him memorise them until he became so familiar with them.

== Reaction towards the Incident at the Gaoping Tombs ==
In 247, when Zhong Hui was appointed as a Gentleman of Writing (尚書郎), Zhang Changpu held her son's hand and cautioned him against self-indulgence. Around the time, the regent Cao Shuang, who dominated the scene in the Wei imperial court, spent his time indulging in alcohol and lavish banquets. When Zhong Hui's elder half-brother, Zhong Yu (鍾毓), returned from one of Cao Shuang's banquets, he told Zhong Hui and Zhang Changpu about what he saw. Zhang Changpu remarked that Cao Shuang would bring about his own downfall eventually because of his extravagant lifestyle.

In 249, Zhong Hui accompanied the Wei emperor Cao Fang on a visit to the Gaoping Tombs (高平陵), where the previous emperors were buried. Around this time, Cao Shuang's co-regent, Sima Yi, used the opportunity to launch a coup to seize power from Cao Shuang. Zhang Changpu remained calm and composed after receiving news about the coup, while others started panicking. The officials Liu Fang (劉放), Wei Guan, Xiahou He and others were puzzled about Zhang Changpu's reaction, so they asked her: "Lady, your son is in danger. Why aren't you worried?" Zhang Changpu replied: "The General-in-Chief (Cao Shuang) has been leading an extravagant life, and I have long suspected that he won't have peace. The Grand Tutor (Sima Yi) will overcome the General-in-Chief with his righteous actions that don't endanger the Empire. My son is with the Emperor, so what is there to worry about? I also heard that this coup doesn't involve heavily armed troops, so I guess it won't last long." The situation turned out to be as she expected. Sima Yi successfully seized power from Cao Shuang and eliminated him later, while Zhong Hui was not harmed in the coup.

== Advice to Zhong Hui ==
Zhong Hui became a skilled practitioner of power politics and strategy after more than ten years of service in the Wei imperial court. One day, Zhang Changpu told her son:

"In the past, Fan Xuanzi's youngest son helped Zhao Jianzi design a strategy to conquer the Zhu state. The plan succeeded and the people were happy. Fan Xuanzi's son was praised for his contribution. However, his mother felt that the use of cunning and deceitful means is nothing to be proud of, and the use of such means won't last in the long term. She was highly perceptive and had very keen foresight. I really admire her. As long as your heart is morally right, I won't blame you for what you do. People often say there's a need to change the moral culture of our time to emulate that of the past, but no one is able to actually live up to such standards. You may use cunning and deceitful means, but you should also honour your word. The key idea is to strike a good balance between achieving these two (conflicting) goals and know when to do what."

Zhong Hui then asked his mother: "Isn't this what a xiaoren should do?" She replied:

"A junzi's great deeds are the results of the accumulation of small good deeds. If you do small good deeds for the sake of doing them and without the aim of fulfilling a greater purpose, you're doing what a xiaoren would do. If you can follow in the footsteps of great men, I can't be more happy."

Zhang Changpu's teaching of Confucian values to her son probably had a strong influence on him in his daily life. He led a simple and frugal lifestyle, wore clothes made of plain dark blue cloth, personally did household chores, and declined to accept large sums of money or precious gifts. He did not keep for himself the rewards, in the form of gold, silver, silk, etc., he received from the imperial court for his contributions, and instead stored them in his family's shared treasury.

== Death ==
Zhang Changpu died of illness at the age of 59 (by East Asian age reckoning) in c.March 257. The Wei emperor Cao Mao issued an imperial decree ordering the regent Sima Zhao to arrange for her funeral and pay for all the expenses.

== See also ==
- Lists of people of the Three Kingdoms
