= Zhong Hui =

Cao Wei calligrapher, essayist and general (225–264)

- 鍾會
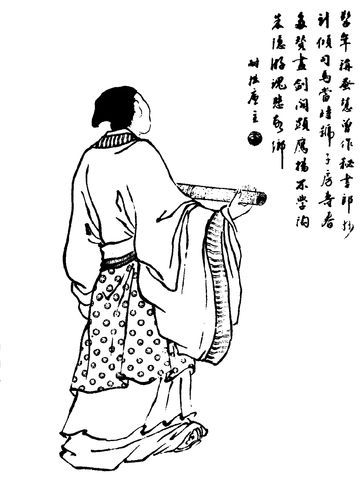

Minister over the Masses (司徒)
- In office 8 February 264 – 3 March 264
- Monarch: Cao Huan
- Preceded by: Zheng Chong
- Succeeded by: He Zeng

General Who Guards the West (鎮西將軍)
- In office 263 – 8 February 264
- Monarch: Cao Huan

Colonel-Director of Retainers (司隷校尉)
- In office 258–263
- Monarch: Cao Mao

Personal details
- Born: 225 (Note: Zhong Hui's biography in the Sanguozhi recorded that he died on the 18th day of the 1st month in the 5th year of the Jing'yuan era of Cao Huan's reign. (Note: ([景元五年正月]十八日日中， ... 姜維率會左右戰，手殺五六人，衆旣格斬維，爭赴殺會。會時年四十，將士死者數百人。) Sanguozhi vol. 28.) This date corresponds to 3 March 264 in the Gregorian calendar. His biography also recorded that he died at the age of 40 (by East Asian age reckoning). (Note: (姜維率會左右戰，手殺五六人，衆旣格斬維，爭赴殺會。會時年四十，將士死者數百人。) Sanguozhi vol. 28.) By calculation, his birth year was 225.)
- Died: 3 March 264 (aged 39) Chengdu, Sichuan
- Relations: Zhong Yu (half-brother); Zhong Shao (half-brother); Xun Xu (nephew)
- Children: Zhong Yi (nephew, adopted son)
- Parents: Zhong Yao (father); Zhang Changpu (mother)
- Occupation: Calligrapher, essayist, general, politician
- Courtesy name: Shiji (士季)
- Peerage: County Marquis (縣侯)

Zhong Hui (225 – 3 March 264), courtesy name Shiji, was a Chinese calligrapher, (Note: In Shu Duan, Zhong Hui was regarded by author Zhang Huaiguan (张怀瓘) as belonging to the second class of excellence ("miaopin" [妙品]); his father Zhong Yao was listed under the first class of excellence ("shenpin" [神品]). See vol.02 of Shu Duan.) essayist, military general, and politician of the state of Cao Wei during the Three Kingdoms period of China. He was the younger son of Zhang Changpu with Zhong Yao, who served as the Grand Tutor in the Wei imperial court. He was already known for being insightful, intelligent and knowledgeable since he was young. Zhong Hui rose to prominence in the 250s when he became a close aide to Sima Zhao, the regent and de facto ruler of Wei. He advised Sima Zhao on how to deal with Zhuge Dan's Rebellion in Shouchun from 257 to 258 and was highly regarded by the latter. With Sima Zhao's help, Zhong Hui steadily moved up the ranks and became one of the key figures in the Wei government.

In 263, the Wei imperial court ordered Zhong Hui, Deng Ai and Zhuge Xu to lead separate armies to attack and conquer Wei's rival state, Shu Han. During and after the campaign against Shu, Zhong Hui framed Zhuge Xu and Deng Ai for cowardice and treason respectively, and seized command of their troops. By the time Shu surrendered to Wei in 263, Zhong Hui was in full control of all the Wei military forces in Shu territory. In 264, with backing from Jiang Wei, a former Shu general, Zhong Hui started a rebellion against Sima Zhao. However, the revolt failed when Zhong Hui's plan to purge several Wei officers – because he was worried that they would not support him – was leaked out. The officers escaped from custody, regrouped with their men, mutinied against Zhong Hui, and killed him and Jiang Wei.

== Early life and career ==
Zhong Hui's ancestral home was in Changshe County (長社縣), Yingchuan Commandery (潁川郡), which is located east of present-day Changge, Henan. He was the younger son of Zhong Yao, who served as the Grand Tutor (太傅) in the Wei imperial court; he was about five years old when Zhong Yao died in 230. At a young age, he was already known for being insightful and intelligent. (Note: (鍾會字士季，潁川長社人，太傅繇小子也。少敏惠夙成。) Sanguozhi vol. 28.) His mother, Zhang Changpu, was known for being very strict with her son and for her influential role in his early education.

The Wei official Jiang Ji wrote in one of his works that one can tell what a person's character is like by observing his/her eye pupils. When Zhong Hui was four years old, his father sent him to meet Jiang Ji, who noted that the boy was extraordinary. By the time Zhong Hui reached adulthood, he was already famous for being hardworking, well read, and versed in different types of arts. During the Zhengshi era (240–249) of the reign of Cao Fang, he served as a Gentleman Cadet of the Imperial Library (秘書郎) and was later promoted to Attendant Gentleman of the Palace Writers and Masters of Writing (尚書中書侍郎). He was awarded the title of a Secondary Marquis (爵關內) when Cao Mao ascended the throne in 254. (Note: (中護軍蔣濟著論，謂「觀其眸子，足以知人。」會年五歲，繇遣見濟，濟甚異之，曰：「非常人也。」及壯，有才數技藝，而愽學精練名理，以夜續晝，由是獲聲譽。正始中，以為秘書郎，遷尚書中書侍郎。高貴鄉公即尊位，賜爵關內侯。) Sanguozhi vol. 28.)

Zhong Hui studied the Yijing. (Note: Xun Yi's biography in Book of Jin recorded that he studied the Yijing together with Zhong Hui. Zhong Hui was also about 20 years younger than Xun Yi.) After his death, a 20-volume book titled Dao Lun (道論) was discovered in his house. The book, which was believed to be written by Zhong Hui, discussed either Legalist or Logician philosophy even though its title suggests it was about Taoism. When he reached adulthood, his fame placed him on par with the philosopher Wang Bi, (Note: (會常論易無玄體、才性同異。及會死後，於會家得書二十篇，名曰道論，而實刑名家也，其文似會。初，會弱冠與山陽王弼並知名。弼好論儒道，辭才逸辯，注易及老子，為尚書郎，年二十餘卒。) Sanguozhi vol. 28.) who was about the same age as him.

=== Gaining the attention of Sima Shi ===
The Shiyu recorded an incident about how Zhong Hui came to the attention of the Wei regent Sima Shi. Sima Shi instructed Yu Song (虞松), the Prefect of the Palace Writers (中書令), to draft a memorandum. He was not satisfied after reading Yu Song's draft and ordered him to rewrite. Yu Song was unable to think of a better way to write the memorandum after racking his brains and felt gloomy. Zhong Hui noticed Yu Song looked troubled, so he offered to help him and changed five words in the memorandum. Yu Song was pleased after looking through Zhong Hui's edits and he presented the revised draft to Sima Shi later. After reading it, Sima Shi asked him, "You didn't make these changes. Who edited it?" Yu Song replied, "Zhong Hui. I've been wanting to recommend him to you, my lord. Now that you asked, I shan't keep him to myself anymore." Sima Shi said, "He's capable of shouldering greater responsibilities. Summon him." When Yu Song informed Zhong Hui that Sima Shi wanted to meet him, Zhong asked him about Sima's abilities, to which Yu replied, "He's learned, wise and multi-talented." Zhong Hui stayed at home for about ten days, during which he refused to meet any visitors and carefully thought about what he would say to Sima Shi. On the day he met Sima Shi, he entered Sima's residence early in the morning and left only at midnight. After Zhong Hui left, Sima Shi remarked, "He's truly a great talent capable of assisting rulers." (Note: (世語曰：司馬景王命中書令虞松作表，再呈輒不可意，命松更定。以經時，松思竭不能改，心苦之，形於顏色。會察其有憂，問松，松以實荅。會取視，為定五字。松恱服，以呈景王，王曰：「不當爾邪，誰所定也？」松曰：「鍾會。向亦欲啟之，會公見問，不敢饕其能。」王曰：「如此，可大用，可令來。」會問松王所能，松曰：「博學明識，無所不貫。」會乃絕賔客，精思十日，平旦入見，至鼓二乃出。出後，王獨拊手歎息曰：「此真王佐材也！」) Wei Jin Shiyu annotation in Sanguozhi vol. 28.)

Pei Songzhi cast doubts on the Shiyu account. He felt that it was unlikely that Yu Song had to recommend Zhong Hui to Sima Shi, because Sima would most probably have already at least heard of Zhong due to the following reasons. First, Zhong Hui came from an elite family background. Second, he was already famous when he was still a youth. Third, he started serving in the Wei government as soon as he reached the age of adulthood. Pei also believed that it was impossible for anyone to be able to tell, simply by reading a piece of writing, that a person who edited a few words in it is capable of shouldering greater responsibilities. (Note: (臣松之以為鍾會名公之子，聲譽夙著，弱冠登朝，已歷顯仕，景王為相，何容不悉，而方於定虞松表然後乃蒙接引乎？設使先不相識，但見五字而便知可大用，雖聖人其猶病諸，而況景王哉？) Pei Songzhi's annotation in Sanguozhi vol. 28.)

== Role in the Shouchun rebellions ==
=== Sima Zhao's rise to power ===
In 255, when the Wei generals Guanqiu Jian and Wen Qin started a rebellion in Shouchun (壽春; present-day Shou County, Anhui), Sima Shi led Wei imperial forces to suppress the revolt, with Zhong Hui accompanying him as an assistant officer. Sima Shi's younger brother, Sima Zhao, followed behind with another army to support them. Sima Shi died in Xuchang after the rebellion was suppressed. He was succeeded by Sima Zhao, who took over command of his troops. At the time, the Wei emperor Cao Mao ordered Sima Zhao to remain in Xuchang and Fu Jia to lead the armies back to the imperial capital, Luoyang. Zhong Hui conspired with Fu Jia to urge Sima Zhao to disregard the emperor's order and lead the troops to a garrison at the south of the Luo River (雒水) near Luoyang. Sima Zhao became the new regent and continued to remain in control of the Wei government as his brother did before him. Zhong Hui was appointed as a Gentleman of the Yellow Gate (黃門侍郎) and awarded the title "Marquis of Dongwu Village" (東武亭侯) with 300 taxable households in his marquisate. (Note: (毌丘儉作亂，大將軍司馬景王東征，會從，典知密事，衞將軍司馬文王為大軍後繼。景王薨於許昌，文王緫統六軍，會謀謨帷幄。時中詔勑尚書傅嘏，以東南新定，權留衞將軍屯許昌為內外之援，令嘏率諸軍還。會與嘏謀，使嘏表上，輒與衞將軍俱發，還到雒水南屯住。於是朝廷拜文王為大將軍、輔政，會遷黃門侍郎，封東武亭侯，邑三百戶。) Sanguozhi vol. 28.)

=== Helping to suppress Zhuge Dan's rebellion ===
In 257, the Wei imperial court summoned the general Zhuge Dan, who was stationed in Shouchun, to return to Luoyang to serve as the Excellency of Works (司空). At the time, Zhong Hui was practising filial mourning because his mother recently died. However, he immediately stopped mourning and went to warn Sima Zhao when he foresaw that Zhuge Dan would disobey the order. Sima Zhao felt that it was troublesome to change the order since it had already been sent out so he did not take any action. Zhuge Dan started a rebellion in Shouchun later. Zhong Hui accompanied Sima Zhao as he led imperial forces to attack the rebels. (Note: (甘露二年，徵諸葛誕為司空，時會喪寧在家，策誕必不從命，馳白文王。文王以事已施行，不復追改。及誕反，車駕住項，文王至壽春，會復從行。) Sanguozhi vol. 28.)

When Zhuge Dan rebelled in Shouchun, Sun Chen, the regent of Wei's rival state Eastern Wu, ordered the general Quan Yì (全懌) and others to lead Wu forces to support Zhuge Dan. Quan Yì had disagreements with his relatives Quan Hui (全輝) and Quan Yí (全儀), who were in the Wu capital, Jianye (建業; present-day Nanjing, Jiangsu). Quan Hui and Quan Yí brought along their families and followers and defected to Wei. When Zhong Hui received news about their defection, he suggested to Sima Zhao to ask Quan Hui and Quan Yí to write a secret letter to Quan Yì and lie to him that Sun Chen was displeased by Quan Yì's failure to conquer Shouchun and wanted to execute Quan Yì's family, hence they decided to defect to Wei. Quan Yì became fearful so he brought along his troops and surrendered to Sima Zhao. Without support from Wu, Zhuge Dan's rebels were defeated by Sima Zhao's forces and Shouchun was taken back by Wei. Zhong Hui was more highly regarded than before by Sima Zhao due to the success of his plan. His contemporaries also compared him to Zhang Liang, a strategist who served under the Han dynasty's founder, Emperor Gao. (Note: (初，吳大將全琮，孫權之婚親重臣也，琮子懌、孫靜、從子端、翩、緝等，皆將兵來救誕。懌兄子輝、儀留建業，與其家內爭訟，携其母，將部曲數十家渡江，自歸文王。會建策，密為輝、儀作書，使輝、儀所親信齎入城告懌等，說吳中怒懌等不能拔壽春，欲盡誅諸將家，故逃來歸命。懌等恐懼，遂將所領開東城門出降，皆蒙封寵，城中由是乖離。壽春之破，會謀居多，親待日隆，時人謂之子房。) Sanguozhi vol. 28.)

After Zhong Hui returned to Luoyang, the Wei imperial court offered him the position of Minister Coachman (太僕), but he turned down the offer and chose to be a clerk in Sima Zhao's office. He was one of Sima Zhao's close aides. Later, the imperial court wanted to enfeoff him as the "Marquis of Chen" (陳侯) to honour him for his contributions in suppressing Zhuge Dan's rebellion, but he declined to accept the marquis title. The court respected his decision and appointed him as the Colonel-Director of Retainers (司隷校尉) instead. Zhong Hui was still heavily involved in politics in the imperial court even though he did not serve in the court. He also played a major role in instigating Sima Zhao to execute Ji Kang. (Note: (軍還，遷為太僕，固辭不就。以中郎在大將軍府管記室事，為腹心之任。以討諸葛誕功，進爵陳侯，屢讓不受。詔曰：「會典綜軍事，參同計策，料敵制勝，有謀謨之勳，而推寵固讓，辭指款實，前後累重，志不可奪。夫成功不處，古人所重，其聽會所執，以成其美。」遷司隷校尉。雖在外司，時政損益，當世與奪，無不綜與。嵇康等見誅，皆會謀也。) Sanguozhi vol. 28.)

== Conquest of Shu ==
=== Strategic planning and opening moves ===
Between 247 and 262, Jiang Wei, a general from Wei's rival state Shu Han, led a series of military campaigns to attack Wei's western borders, but failed to make any significant territorial gains. Sima Zhao felt that Shu was growing weak and lacking in resources after all the campaigns, hence he wanted to launch a large-scale invasion of Shu to eliminate it. Among those he consulted, only Zhong Hui agreed that Shu could be conquered. Zhong Hui assisted Sima Zhao in formulating a strategy for the conquest of Shu. (Note: (文王以蜀大將姜維屢擾邊陲，料蜀國小民疲，資力單竭，欲大舉圖蜀。惟會亦以為蜀可取，豫共籌度地形，考論事勢。) Sanguozhi vol. 28.)

In the winter of 262–263, Zhong Hui was appointed General Who Guards the West (鎮西將軍) and granted imperial authority to manage military affairs in the Guanzhong region. Sima Zhao also mobilised military forces from the various provinces in Wei and ordered Tang Zi to oversee the construction of warships in preparation for an invasion on Wei's other rival state, Eastern Wu. (Note: (景元三年冬，以會為鎮西將軍、假節都督關中諸軍事。文王勑青、徐、兖、豫、荊、揚諸州，並使作船，又令唐咨作浮海大船，外為將伐吳者。) Sanguozhi vol. 28.)

In the autumn of 263, the Wei imperial court issued an edict ordering Deng Ai and Zhuge Xu to lead 30,000 troops each and attack Shu from two directions: Deng Ai's force would pass through Gansong (甘松; southeast of present-day Têwo County, Gansu) and Tazhong (沓中; northwest of present-day Zhugqu County, Gansu), and engage Jiang Wei's army; Zhuge Xu's force would pass through Wujie Bridge (武街橋; northwest of present-day Wen County, Gansu) and block Jiang Wei's retreat route. Zhong Hui led another army, numbering some 100,000 men, and entered Shu territory via the Xie Valley (斜谷; southwest of present-day Mei County, Shaanxi) and Luo Valley (駱谷; southwest of present-day Zhouzhi County, Shaanxi). (Note: (四年秋，乃下詔使鄧艾、諸葛緒各統諸軍三萬餘人，艾趣甘松、沓中連綴維，緒趣武街、橋頭絕維歸路。會統十餘萬衆，分從斜谷、駱谷入。) Sanguozhi vol. 28.)

Zhong Hui ordered Xu Yi, a son of the veteran Wei general Xu Chu, to oversee the construction of a road leading into Shu. However, when the road turned out to be poorly built, Zhong Hui disregarded Xu Yi's background and had him executed for failing his mission. The Wei army was shocked at Zhong Hui's audacity. (Note: (先命牙門將許儀在前治道，會在後行，而橋穿，馬足陷，於是斬儀。儀者，許褚之子，有功王室，猶不原貸。諸軍聞之，莫不震竦。) Sanguozhi vol. 28.)

=== Engagements with Shu forces ===
In response to the Wei invasion, the Shu government ordered its armed forces to refrain from engaging the enemy and instead retreat to Hancheng (漢城; east of present-day Mian County, Shaanxi) and Lecheng (樂城; east of present-day Chenggu County, Shaanxi) and hold their positions. Liu Qin (劉欽), the Administrator of the Wei-controlled Weixing Commandery (魏興郡; around present-day Ankang, Shaanxi), led his army through the Ziwu Valley (子午谷; east of present-day Yang County, Shaanxi) towards the Shu-controlled Hanzhong Commandery. The Shu officers Wang Han (王含) and Jiang Bin (蔣斌) defended Hancheng and Lecheng respectively with 5,000 troops each. Zhong Hui ordered his subordinates Xun Kai (荀愷) and Li Fu (李輔) to lead 10,000 men each to attack Hancheng and Lecheng, while he led his main army towards Yang'an Pass (陽安口; also known as Yangping Pass, in present-day Ningqiang County, Shaanxi). Along the way, he sent his men to pay respects on his behalf at Zhuge Liang's tomb. (Note: at the foot of Mount Dingjun, Mian County, Shaanxi) When he arrived at Yang'an Pass, he ordered Hu Lie (胡烈) to lead the attack on the pass. Hu Lie succeeded in capturing the pass and the supplies stored there by Shu forces. (Note: (蜀令諸圍皆不得戰，退還漢、樂二城守。魏興太守劉欽趣子午谷，諸軍數道平行，至漢中。蜀監軍王含守樂城，護軍蔣斌守漢城，兵各五千。會使護軍荀愷、前將軍李輔各統萬人，愷圍漢城，輔圍樂城。會徑過，西出陽安口，遣人祭諸葛亮之墓。使護軍胡烈等行前，攻破關城，得庫藏積糓。) Sanguozhi vol. 28.)

Jiang Wei retreated from Tazhong towards Yinping (陰平; northwest of present-day Wen County, Gansu), where he rallied his troops and prepared to reinforce Yang'an Pass. However, he retreated to a fort at Baishui (白水; in present-day Qingchuan County, Sichuan) when he heard that Yang'an Pass had been captured by Wei forces. He rendezvoused with the Shu generals Zhang Yi, Liao Hua and others and moved to defend their position at the fortified mountain pass Jiange (劒閣; also known as Jianmen Pass, in present-day Jiange County, Sichuan). Zhong Hui wrote a long address to the Shu forces, urging them to give up resistance and surrender to Wei. (Note: (姜維自沓中還，至陰平，合集士衆，欲赴關城。未到，聞其已破，退趣白水，與蜀將張翼、廖化等合守劒閣拒會。會移檄蜀將吏士民曰： ...) Sanguozhi vol. 28.)

Deng Ai pursued Jiang Wei to Yinping, where he formed a group of elite soldiers from among his troops and took a shortcut to Jiangyou (江由; north of present-day Jiangyou, Sichuan) through Deyang Village (德陽亭; northwest of present-day Jiange County, Sichuan), and approached Mianzhu, which was near the Shu capital Chengdu. He asked Zhuge Xu to join him. Zhuge Xu had received orders to block Jiang Wei's advance and was not authorised to join Deng Ai in his mission, so he led his force to Baishui County to rendezvous with Zhong Hui. Zhong Hui ordered Tian Zhang (田章) and others to lead a force to bypass the west of Jiange and approach Jiangyou. Along the way, they encountered three groups of Shu ambushers, defeated them and destroyed their camps. Deng Ai let Tian Zhang lead the vanguard and clear the path. (Note: (鄧艾追姜維到陰平，簡選精銳，欲從漢德陽入江由、左儋道詣緜竹，趣成都，與諸葛緒共行。緒以本受節度邀姜維，西行非本詔，遂進軍前向白水，與會合。會遣將軍田章等從劒閣西，徑出江由。未至百里，章先破蜀伏兵三校，艾使章先登。遂長駈而前。) Sanguozhi vol. 28.)

=== Fall of Shu ===
When Zhong Hui and Zhuge Xu arrived near Jiange, Zhong Hui desired to seize control of Zhuge Xu's command, so he secretly reported to the Wei imperial court that Zhuge Xu displayed cowardice in battle. As a result, Zhuge Xu was stripped of his command and sent back to the Wei capital Luoyang, while Zhong Hui took command of his army. Zhong Hui then ordered an attack on Jiange but failed to conquer the mountain pass because the Shu forces put up a strong defence, so he retreated. (Note: (會與緒軍向劒閣，會欲專軍勢，密白緒畏懦不進，檻車徵還。軍悉屬會，進攻劒閣，不克，引退，蜀軍保險拒守。) Sanguozhi vol. 28.)

In the meantime, Deng Ai and his men reached Mianzhu, where they defeated a Shu army led by Zhuge Zhan, who was killed in action. When Jiang Wei learnt of Zhuge Zhan's death, he led his forces east towards Ba Commandery (巴郡; present-day Chongqing). Zhong Hui led his army to Fu County (涪縣; present-day Mianyang, Sichuan) and ordered Hu Lie (胡烈), Tian Xu, Pang Hui and others to lead troops to pursue Jiang Wei. At the same time, Deng Ai and his men had arrived outside Chengdu. The Shu emperor Liu Shan surrendered to Deng Ai without putting up a fight, and then gave orders to Jiang Wei to surrender to Zhong Hui. Jiang Wei headed to Fu County, where he ordered his men to lay down their arms and surrender to Zhong Hui. (Note: (艾遂至緜竹，大戰，斬諸葛瞻。維等聞瞻已破，率其衆東入于巴。會乃進軍至涪，遣胡烈、田續、龐會等追維。艾進軍向成都，劉禪詣艾降，遣使勑維等令降於會。維至廣漢郪縣，令兵悉放器仗，送節傳於胡烈，便從東道詣會降。) Sanguozhi vol. 28.)

Following the successful conquest of Shu, Zhong Hui wrote a memorial to the Wei imperial court to report his contributions and urge the government to pacify and restore peace in Shu through benevolent governance. He also gave strict orders forbidding his troops from plundering and pillaging the Shu lands, and treated the former Shu officials in a respectful manner. He got along very well with Jiang Wei. (Note: (會上言曰：「賊姜維、張翼、廖化、董厥等逃死遁走， ... 百姓欣欣，人懷逸豫，后來其蘇，義無以過。」會於是禁檢士衆不得鈔略，虛己誘納，以接蜀之群司，與維情好歡甚。) Sanguozhi vol. 28.)

In the winter of 263–264, the Wei imperial court issued a decree to praise Zhong Hui for his contributions in the conquest of Shu. Zhong Hui was appointed Minister over the Masses, promoted from a village-level marquis to a county-level marquis, and had the number of taxable households in his marquisate increased to 10,000. His two (adoptive) sons were each granted a village marquis title and 1,000 taxable households in their marquisate. (Note: (十二月詔曰：「會所向摧弊，前無彊敵，緘制衆城，罔羅迸逸。蜀之豪帥，靣縛歸命，謀無遺策，舉無廢功。凡所降誅，動以萬計，全勝獨克，有征無戰。拓平西夏，方隅清晏。其以會為司徒，進封縣侯，增邑萬戶。封子二人亭侯，邑各千戶。」) Sanguozhi vol. 28.)

== Downfall and death ==
=== Arresting Deng Ai ===
Zhong Hui had long harboured the intention of rebelling against Wei. When he saw that Deng Ai behaved in an autocratic manner even though his military command was authorised by the Wei imperial court, he secretly reported to the court that Deng was plotting a rebellion. He was skilled in imitating people's handwriting. After intercepting a report written by Deng Ai to the Wei imperial court, he edited the report to make it sound arrogant and demanding. At the same time, he also destroyed a letter from Sima Zhao to Deng Ai. (Note: (世語曰：會善效人書，於劒閣要艾章表白事，皆易其言，令辭指悖傲，多自矜伐。又毀文王報書，手作以疑之也。又毀文王報書，手作以疑之也。) Shiyu annotation in Sanguozhi vol. 28.) The Wei government fell for Zhong Hui's ruse and ordered Deng Ai to be arrested and transported back to Luoyang in a prison cart. Sima Zhao was worried that Deng Ai would not submit, so he ordered Zhong Hui and Wei Guan to arrest Deng Ai. With Zhong Hui and his troops following behind, Wei Guan went to Deng Ai's camp in Chengdu and used Sima Zhao's letter of authorisation to order Deng's soldiers to put down their weapons. Deng Ai was arrested and placed in a prison cart. (Note: (會內有異志，因鄧艾承制專事，密白艾有反狀，於是詔書檻車徵艾。司馬文王懼艾或不從命，勑會並進軍成都，監軍衞瓘在會前行，以文王手筆令宣喻艾軍，艾軍皆釋仗，遂收艾入檻車。) Sanguozhi vol. 28.)

=== Planning ===
Zhong Hui had been wary of Deng Ai, so after Deng was arrested, he immediately assumed command of the Wei forces in the former Shu territories. He was overwhelmed by feelings of megalomania after seeing that he wielded great power in his hands, so he decided to rebel against Wei. He came up with a strategy for capturing the Wei capital, Luoyang, in the following sequence:

1. Jiang Wei would lead a vanguard force out of the Xie Valley (斜谷) to attack the city of Chang'an. Zhong Hui would follow behind with the main army and provide support.
2. After capturing Chang'an, the army would be split into two groups – infantry and cavalry. The infantry would sail along the Wei and Yellow rivers towards Meng Ford (孟津) near Luoyang while the cavalry would ride towards Luoyang on land. Zhong Hui estimated that the journey would take five days.
3. The infantry and cavalry would rendezvous outside Luoyang and attack the city together. (Note: (會所憚惟艾，艾旣禽而會尋至，獨統大衆，威震西土。自謂功名蓋世，不可復為人下，加猛將銳卒皆在己手，遂謀反。欲使姜維等皆將蜀兵出斜谷，會自將大衆隨其後。旣至長安，令騎士從陸道，步兵從水道順流浮渭入河，以為五日可到孟津，與騎會洛陽，一旦天下可定也。) Sanguozhi vol. 28.)

Zhong Hui received a letter from Sima Zhao, which read: "I fear Deng Ai might not submit. I have ordered Jia Chong to lead 10,000 infantry and cavalry into the Xie Valley and station at Lecheng. I will lead 100,000 troops to garrison at Chang'an. We will be meeting each other soon." After reading the letter, Zhong Hui was shocked and he told his close aides, "When His Excellency ordered me to arrest Deng Ai, he knew I was capable of accomplishing the task alone. However, now, since he has brought his troops here, he must be suspecting me. We should take action quickly. If we succeed, the Empire is ours. If we fail, we can retreat to Shu Han and do as Liu Bei did before us. It is widely known that my plans have never failed once since the Shouchun rebellions. How can I be contented with such fame?" (Note: (會得文王書云：「恐鄧艾或不就徵，今遣中護軍賈充將步騎萬人徑入斜谷，屯樂城，吾自將十萬屯長安，相見在近。」會得書，驚呼所親語之曰：「但取鄧艾，相國知我能獨辦之；今來大重，必覺我異矣，便當速發。事成，可得天下；不成，退保蜀漢，不失作劉備也。我自淮南以來，畫無遣策，四海所共知也。我欲持此安歸乎！」) Sanguozhi vol. 28.)

=== Mutiny ===
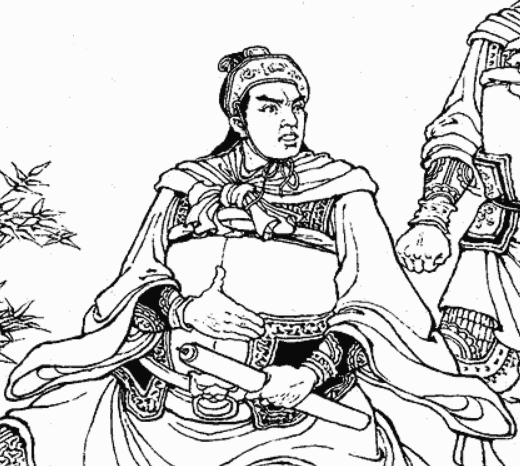
Depiction of Zhong Hui in the "Romance of the Three Kingdoms Lianhuanhua" from 1957.

Zhong Hui arrived in Chengdu on 29 February 264. The following day, he summoned all the high-ranking officers and former Shu officers to the old Shu imperial court in the name of holding a memorial service for the recently deceased Empress Dowager Guo. During the service, he showed them an imperial decree and claimed it was issued by the empress dowager before she died. In the decree, Empress Dowager Guo wanted all those who were loyal to Wei to rise up against Sima Zhao and remove him from power. The decree was actually a fake one written by Zhong Hui. Zhong Hui sought the officers' opinions, asked them to sign on a list if they agreed to carry out the empress dowager's dying wish, and then instructed his close aides to take over command of the various military units. He then had all the officers detained in their respective offices with the doors shut, and ordered the gates of the city to be closed and tightly guarded. (Note: (會以五年正月十五日至，其明日，悉請護軍、郡守、牙門騎督以上及蜀之故官，為太后發喪於蜀朝堂。矯太后遺詔，使會起兵廢文王，皆班示坐上人，使下議訖，書版署置，更使所親信代領諸軍。所請群官，悉閉著益州諸曹屋中，城門宮門皆閉，嚴兵圍守。) Sanguozhi vol. 28.)

Qiu Jian (丘建), an officer serving under Zhong Hui, used to be a subordinate of Hu Lie (胡烈). Hu Lie recommended him to Sima Zhao. Zhong Hui favoured and regarded Qiu Jian highly and requested for him to be transferred to his unit. Qiu Jian sympathised with Hu Lie, who was detained alone inside a room, so he approached Zhong Hui and said that each of the detained officers should have a servant to attend to their personal needs. Zhong Hui agreed. Hu Lie lied to his servant and wrote a letter to his sons, in which he claimed he heard from Qiu Jian that Zhong Hui was planning to purge the officers not from his own unit by luring them into a trap and killing them. The rumour spread among all the detained officers. When Zhong Hui's men received news about the rumour, they suggested to their superior to execute all the officers holding the rank of Cavalry Commandant of the Standard (牙門騎督) and above. Zhong Hui could not decide on what to do. (Note: (會帳下督丘建本屬胡烈，烈薦之文王，會請以自隨，任愛之。建愍烈獨坐，啟會，使聽內一親兵出取飲食，諸牙門隨例各內一人。烈紿語親兵及疏與其子曰：「丘建密說消息，會已作大坑，白棓數千，欲悉呼外兵入，人賜白㡊，拜為散將，以次棓殺坑中。」諸牙門親兵亦咸說此語，一夜傳相告，皆徧。或謂會：「可盡殺牙門騎督以上。」會猶豫未決。) Sanguozhi vol. 28.)

Around noon on 3 March 264, Hu Lie's sons and subordinates started beating the drums and their soldiers followed suit. After that, they rushed towards the city gates in a disorderly manner because they had no one to lead them. Around the time, Jiang Wei was collecting his armour and weapons from Zhong Hui when they heard shouting and received news that a fire had broken out. Moments later, it was reported that many soldiers were crowding near the city gates. Zhong Hui was surprised and he asked Jiang Wei, "Those men are causing trouble. What should we do?" Jiang Wei replied, "Kill them." Zhong Hui then ordered his men to kill the officers who were still detained in their offices. Some of the officers used pieces of furniture to block the doors. Zhong Hui's men rammed the doors but could not force them open. A while later, there were reports of people climbing up the city gates on ladders and of people setting fire to buildings. Chaos broke out and arrows were fired in all directions. The detained officers broke out of captivity, regrouped with their men, and attacked Zhong Hui and Jiang Wei. Zhong Hui and Jiang Wei fought the mutinying soldiers and slew about five or six of them, but were eventually overwhelmed and killed by them. Zhong Hui was 40 years old (by East Asian age reckoning) when he died. Hundreds of lives were lost in the mutiny. (Note: (十八日日中，烈軍兵與烈兒雷鼓出門，諸軍兵不期皆鼓譟出，曾無督促之者，而爭先赴城。時方給與姜維鎧杖，白外有匈匈聲，似失火，有頃，白兵走向城。會驚，謂維曰：「兵來似欲作惡，當云何？」維曰：「但當擊之耳。」會遣兵悉殺所閉諸牙門郡守，內人共舉机以柱門，兵斫門，不能破。斯須，門外倚梯登城，或燒城屋，蟻附亂進，矢下如雨，牙門、郡守各緣屋出，與其卒兵相得。姜維率會左右戰，手殺五六人，衆旣格斬維，爭赴殺會。會時年四十，將士死者數百人。) Sanguozhi vol. 28.)

=== Sima Zhao's foresight ===
Initially, when Sima Zhao wanted to put Zhong Hui in charge of leading the Wei army to conquer Shu, Shao Ti (邵悌) warned him that Zhong Hui might rebel against Wei because he was in command of an army of thousands, was single, and had no family to worry about. Sima Zhao laughed and said he understood Shao Ti's concern very well, but chose to let Zhong Hui lead the Wei army because he had faith in Zhong's ability to conquer Shu. He also predicted that Zhong Hui would not succeed even if he rebelled because of two reasons. First, the people of Shu would not support Zhong Hui because they were already fearful after witnessing the fall of Shu. Second, the Wei forces would not support Zhong Hui because they were already exhausted and homesick after the campaign. (Note: (初，文王欲遣會伐蜀，西曹屬邵悌求見曰：「今遣鍾會率十餘萬衆伐蜀，愚謂會單身無重任，不若使餘人行。」文王笑曰：「我寧當復不知此耶？蜀為天下作患，使民不得安息，我今伐之如指掌耳，而衆人皆言蜀不可伐。夫人心豫怯則智勇並竭，智勇並竭而彊使之，適為敵禽耳。惟鍾會與人意同，今遣會伐蜀，必可滅蜀。滅蜀之後，就如卿所慮，當何所能一辦耶？凡敗軍之將不可以語勇，亡國之大夫不可與圖存，心膽以破故也。若蜀以破，遺民震恐，不足與圖事；中國將士各自思歸，不肯與同也。若作惡，祗自滅族耳。卿不須憂此，慎莫使人聞也。」) Sanguozhi vol. 28.)

Later, after Zhong Hui secretly accused Deng Ai of plotting a rebellion, Sima Zhao wanted to lead his forces to station at Chang'an. Shao Ti told Sima Zhao that there was no need for him to go to Chang'an because Zhong Hui was capable of arresting Deng Ai on his own since he had five to six times more troops than Deng Ai. Sima Zhao replied, "Have you forgotten what you said previously? Why are you asking me not to go (to Chang'an) now? Please keep secret what we spoke about. I treat people with trust and respect. As long as they remain loyal to me, I will not doubt them. Jia Chong recently asked me, 'Are you suspicious of Zhong Hui?' I replied, 'If I send you on a mission today, do you think I doubt you?' He could not respond to my reply. Everything will be settled when I arrive in Chang'an." By the time Sima Zhao reached Chang'an, Zhong Hui had already been killed in the mutiny, just as Sima Zhao foresaw. (Note: (及會白鄧艾不軌，文王將西，悌復曰：「鍾會所統，五六倍於鄧艾，但可勑會取艾，不足自行。」文王曰：「卿忘前時所言邪，而更云可不須行乎？雖爾，此言不可宣也。我要自當以信義待人，但人不當負我，我豈可先人生心哉！近日賈護軍問我，言：『頗疑鍾會不？』我荅言：『如今遣卿行，寧可復疑卿邪？』賈亦無以易我語也。我到長安，則自了矣。」軍至長安，會果已死，咸如所策。) Sanguozhi vol. 28.)

== Family and relatives ==
Zhong Hui's father, Zhong Yao, was a prominent politician and calligrapher who held the position of Grand Tutor (太傅) in the Wei imperial court. Zhong Hui's mother, Zhang Changpu, was one of Zhong Yao's concubines and was known for her virtuous conduct, wisdom, and influential role in her son's early education.

Zhong Hui's elder half-brother, Zhong Yu (鍾毓), died in the winter of 263. Zhong Hui made no response to the death of his brother. Zhong Yu had four sons: Zhong Jun (鍾峻), Zhong Yong (鍾邕), Zhong Yi (鍾毅) and Zhong Chan (鍾辿). Zhong Yi was raised as Zhong Hui's adoptive son because Zhong Hui was single and had no children. Zhong Yong was killed along with his uncle Zhong Hui during the mutiny and his family members were executed. In the aftermath of Zhong Hui's failed rebellion, Zhong Jun, Zhong Yi and Zhong Chan were implicated, arrested and placed on death row for their relations to Zhong Hui. However, Sima Zhao took into consideration that Zhong Yao and Zhong Yu had rendered meritorious service to Wei, hence he decided to let them preserve their posterity. He made the Wei emperor Cao Huan issue an imperial decree, which pardoned Zhong Jun and Zhong Chan and restored them to their original official positions and titles. Zhong Yi, however, was executed (Note: (會兄毓，以四年冬薨，會竟未知問。會兄子邕，隨會與俱死，會所養兄子毅及峻、辿。等下獄，當伏誅。司馬文王表天子下詔曰：「峻等祖父繇，三祖之世，極位台司，佐命立勳，饗食廟庭。父毓，歷職內外，幹事有績。昔楚思子文之治，不滅鬪氏之祀。晉錄成宣之忠，用存趙氏之後。以會、邕之罪，而絕繇、毓之類，吾有愍然！峻、辿兄弟特原，有官爵者如故。惟毅及邕息伏法。」) Sanguozhi vol. 28.) because he was Zhong Hui's adoptive son and was hence not eligible for the pardon.

It is believed that Sima Zhao decided to spare Zhong Jun and Zhong Chan because Zhong Yu once warned him that Zhong Hui was manipulative and should not be placed in positions with great power. (Note: (或曰，毓曾密啟司馬文王，言會挾術難保，不可專任，故宥峻等云。) Sanguozhi vol. 28.) Sima Zhao laughed, praised Zhong Yu for his honest advice, and promised that he would spare Zhong Yu's family if Zhong Hui really did commit treason. (Note: (漢晉春秋曰：文王嘉其忠亮，笑荅毓曰：「若如卿言，必不以及宗矣。」) Han Jin Chunqiu annotation in Sanguozhi vol. 28.)

== Appraisal ==
=== Chen Shou ===
Chen Shou, who wrote Zhong Hui's biography in the Records of the Three Kingdoms (Sanguozhi), praised him as "knowledgeable and skilled with numerological operations", as he mentioned Zhong Hui was once as famous as the philosopher Wang Bi when they were young. He then lumped Zhong Hui together with Wang Ling, Guanqiu Jian, and Zhuge Dan in his criticism: "They were famous for their various talents, which helped them rise to high positions. It was a pity that they were overly ambitious, had morally crooked ideas, and failed to recognise the hidden pitfalls around them. These resulted in their downfalls and the extermination of their families. Can it be any more fatuous than this?" (Note: (評曰： ... 鍾會精練策數，咸以顯名，致茲榮任，而皆心大志迂，不慮禍難，變如發機，宗族塗地，豈不謬惑邪！) Sanguozhi vol. 28.)

=== Xiahou Ba ===
The Shiyu recorded that when the Wei general Xiahou Ba defected to Shu, the Shu officials asked him, "What does Sima Yi do best?" Xiahou Ba replied, "Solidifying his family's position in Wei." They asked him again, "Who are the talents in the Wei capital?" Xiahou Ba replied, "There's one Zhong Shiji. Wu and Shu should be worried if he's in charge of the Wei government." (Note: (世語曰：夏侯霸奔蜀，蜀朝問「司馬公如何德」？霸曰：「自當作家門。」「京師俊士」？曰：「有鍾士季，其人管朝政，吳、蜀之憂也。」) Shiyu annotation in Sanguozhi vol. 28.)

The Han Jin Chunqiu mentioned that the Shu general Jiang Wei also asked Xiahou Ba, "Now that Sima Yi is in control of the Wei government, is he still planning to launch any campaigns against Shu and Wu?" Xiahou Ba replied, "He focuses on strengthening his family's control of the Wei government and doesn't have time to bother about external affairs. However, there's one Zhong Shiji. He may be young, but he'll definitely become a threat to Wu and Shu in the future. Despite so, even the most extraordinary people can't control him." Xiahou Ba was proven right 15 years later because Zhong Hui was one of the key figures in the Wei conquest of Shu. (Note: (漢晉春秋曰：初，夏侯霸降蜀，姜維問之曰：「司馬懿旣得彼政，當復有征伐之志不？」霸曰：「彼方營立家門，未遑外事。有鍾士季者，其人雖少，終為吳、蜀之憂，然非常之人亦不能用也。」後十五年而會果滅蜀。) Han Jin Chunqiu annotation in Sanguozhi vol. 28.)

Pei Songzhi added the Shiyu account to support what Xi Zuochi wrote in the Han Jin Chunqiu. (Note: (按習鑿齒此言，非出他書，故採用世語而附益也。) Pei Songzhi's annotation in Sanguozhi vol. 28.)

== In popular culture ==
Zhong Hui is first introduced as a playable character in the seventh instalment of Koei's Dynasty Warriors video game series.

== See also ==
- Lists of people of the Three Kingdoms
