= Battle of Hefei (233) =

Battle between Eastern Wu and Cao Wei in 233

- Part of the wars of the Three Kingdoms period
Date	233
Location	Hefei, Anhui, China
Result	Cao Wei victory; Eastern Wu retreat

Belligerents
Cao Wei	Eastern Wu

Commanders and leaders
Man Chong	Sun Quan

Battle of Hefei
- Traditional Chinese: 合肥之戰
- Simplified Chinese: 合肥之战
Transcriptions
Standard Mandarin
- Hanyu Pinyin: Héféi Zhī Zhàn

The Battle of Hefei was fought between the contending states of Cao Wei and Eastern Wu in 233 during the Three Kingdoms period of China.

== Background ==
In 230, the Cao Wei state constructed a new fortress at Hefei to defend against its rival state of Wu. The fortress is referred to as "Xincheng" (新城; literally: "new city/fortress") in historical sources.

== The battle ==
In 233, the Wu emperor Sun Quan led an army across the Yangtze River to attack Xincheng. However, as the fortress was located very inland, Sun Quan's forces remained on their ships for more than 20 days. Man Chong, the Wei general defending Xincheng, secretly sent 6,000 infantry and cavalry to wait in ambush near the river. When Sun Quan's forces set foot on land, they were suddenly attacked by the Wei army lying in ambush. Hundreds of Wu soldiers were killed while others drowned in the river as they attempted to flee. Sun Quan ordered a retreat after his defeat. He later sent Quan Cong to attack Lu'an, but Quan was unsuccessful and withdrew as well.
