= Hedong Commandery =

Historic commandery of China

Hedong Commandery (simplified Chinese: 河东郡; traditional Chinese: 河東郡; pinyin: Hédōng Jùn) was a commandery of the Qin and Han dynasties of China. It was located to the east of the Yellow River in Shanxi, around present-day Yuncheng.

== History ==
Hedong Commandery was established by the Qin state during the Warring States period. Its seat was Anyi, the former capital of Wei. During the Western Han dynasty, It administered 24 counties: Anyi (安邑), Dayang (大陽), Yishi (猗氏), Xie (解), Puban (蒲反), Hebei (河北), Zuoyi (左邑), Fenyin (汾陰), Wenxi (聞喜), Huoze (濩澤), Duanshi (端氏), Linfen (臨汾), Yuan (垣), Pishi (皮氏), Changxiu (長脩), Pingyang (平陽), Xiangling (襄陵), Zhi (彘), Yang (楊), Beiqu (北屈), Puzi (蒲子), Jiang (絳), Hunie (狐讘) and Qi (騏). In 2 AD, the commandery had a population of 962,912, in 236,896 households.

During the Cao Wei dynasty, a separate Pingyang Commandery was formed from several counties of Hedong. In early Jin dynasty, Hedong administered nine counties, including Anyi, Wenxi, Yuan, Fenyang, Dayang, Yishi, Xie, Puban and Hebei. In the Northern dynasties, part of the commandery was separated to form the new Hebei Commandery, and several counties became part of other commanderies.

In 583, the commandery was merged into Pu Prefecture (蒲州). Later, Hedong Commandery would become an alternative name of Pu. In 742, the population was 469,213, in 70,800 households.

== Famous People ==
- Guan Yu
- Xu Huang
- Pei clan of Hedong
- Wei Guan
