= Zhou Fang (Eastern Wu) =

3rd century Eastern Wu general and official

- 周魴

Major-General (裨將軍)
- In office 228 or after – ?
- Monarch: Sun Quan

Colonel of Illustrious Righteousness (昭義校尉)
- In office 226 – ?
- Monarch: Sun Quan

Administrator of Poyang (鄱陽太守)
- In office 226 – 239?
- Monarch: Sun Quan

Commandant of the West District of Danyang (丹楊西部都尉)
- In office ?–?

Chancellor of Qiantang (錢唐相)
- In office ?–?

Personal details
- Born: Unknown; Yixing, Jiangsu
- Died: early 239?
- Children: Zhou Chu
- Parent: Zhou Bin (father)
- Occupation: Military general, politician
- Courtesy name: Ziyu (子魚)
- Peerage: Secondary Marquis (關內侯)

Zhou Fang (fl. 200s–239), courtesy name Ziyu, was a Chinese military general and politician of the state of Eastern Wu during the Three Kingdoms period of China.

== Life ==
Zhou Fang was from Yangxian County (陽羨縣), Wu Commandery, which is around present-day Yixing, Jiangsu. He was known for being well-read and studious in his youth. When he reached the age of adulthood, he was nominated as a xiaolian (civil service candidate) to serve in the local commandery office. Around the time, one Peng Shi (彭式) had rallied several supporters in Qiantang County (錢唐縣) and formed a bandit gang to terrorise the locals. Sun Quan, the warlord who ruled the territories in Jiangdong at the time, appointed Zhou Fang as the Chancellor (相; i.e. chief administrative officer) of Qiantang County to deal with Peng Shi. Within 10 days, Zhou Fang eliminated Peng Shi and the bandits, and was promoted to serve as the Commandant of the West District (西部都尉) in Danyang Commandery (丹楊郡).

In January or February 226, one Peng Qi (彭綺) started a rebellion in Poyang Commandery (鄱陽郡). Sun Quan appointed Zhou Fang as the Administrator (太守) of Poyang Commandery and tasked him and Hu Zong (胡綜) with putting down the rebellion. Zhou Fang and Hu Zong succeeded in their mission and captured Peng Qi alive and sent him as a captive to Sun Quan. For his efforts in quelling the revolt, Zhou Fang was promoted to Colonel of Illustrious Righteousness (昭義校尉).

In 228, Zhou Fang became the central figure in the Battle of Shiting between Eastern Wu and its rival state Cao Wei. He pretended to surrender and defect to Cao Xiu, the Wei commander, who fell for his ruse and led some 100,000 troops to attack Wan County (皖縣; present-day Qianshan County, Anhui). Along the way, Wu forces led by Lu Xun and Zhou Fang ambushed Cao Xiu and his army and dealt them a crushing defeat with several thousands of casualties. In recognition of Zhou Fang's contributions in the battle, Sun Quan promoted him to Major-General (裨將軍) and awarded him the title of a Secondary Marquis (關內侯).

When bandit forces led by Dong Si (董嗣) raided Yuzhang (豫章) and Linchuan (臨川) commanderies, the Wu officers Wu Can and Tang Zi led 3,000 troops to attack them but could not breach their base. Zhou Fang came up with a plan by sending a spy to assassinate Dong Si, after which Dong Si's brother led the other bandits to willingly surrender to Wu forces.

Zhou Fang served as the Administrator of Poyang Commandery for about 13 years until his death (probably in early 239). During his tenure, he governed fairly and justly. His son, Zhou Chu, became a famous general during the Jin dynasty.

== See also ==
- Lists of people of the Three Kingdoms
