= Battle of Shiting =

Battle between Cao Wei and Eastern Wu (228)

Battle of Shi'ting
- Part of the wars of the Three Kingdoms period
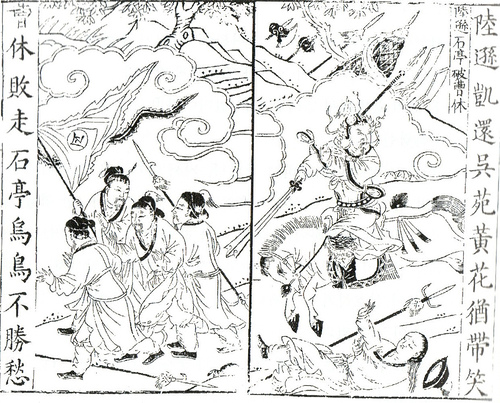
- A Qing dynasty illustration of Cao Xiu's defeat
Date	June – October 228 (Note: Sun Quan's biography in the Sanguozhi recorded that Zhou Fang pretended to defect to Wei and lure Cao Xiu into a trap in the 5th month of the 7th year of the Huangwu era of Sun Quan's reign. Lu Xun defeated Cao Xiu in the 8th month of that year. The corresponding date range in the Gregorian calendar was from 20 June 228 (1st day of the 5th month) to 15 October 228 (30th day of the 8th month).)
Location	Qianshan County, Anhui, China 30°45′39″N 116°33′11″E
Result	Eastern Wu victory

Belligerents
Eastern Wu	Cao Wei

Commanders and leaders
Lu Xun; Zhou Fang; Quan Cong; Zhu Huan	Cao Xiu; Jia Kui
- Location within China

Battle of Shiting
- Traditional Chinese: 石亭之戰
- Simplified Chinese: 石亭之战
Transcriptions
Standard Mandarin
- Hanyu Pinyin: Shítíng Zhī Zhàn

The Battle of Shi'ting (literal meaning "stone pavilion") was fought between the states of Cao Wei and Eastern Wu in 228 during the Three Kingdoms period of China. The battle concluded with a Wu victory.

== Battle ==
The Wu king Sun Quan ordered Zhou Fang to lay a trap for the Wei general Cao Xiu by pretending to defect to Wei. Cao Xiu was deceived into leading his troops straight into Wan (皖; present-day Qianshan County, Anhui). Sun Quan then appointed his general Lu Xun as Grand Chief Controller and ordered him to lead an attack on Cao Xiu. On the way to Wan, Cao Xiu fell into an ambush by Wu forces. He was unable to gain the upper hand in battle so he ordered a retreat to Shiting. In the middle of the night, the Wei soldiers started panicking and many of them deserted and abandoned their weapons, armour, and equipment.

After his defeat, Cao Xiu wrote a memorial to the Wei emperor Cao Rui to apologize for his failure and requesting to be punished. After realising that he had been tricked by Zhou Fang, Cao Xiu felt too ashamed to turn back. Thinking that he had more troops and supplies, he chose to engage Lu Xun's army. Lu Xun personally led the central force and ordered Zhu Huan and Quan Cong to take the left and right flanks. The three armies advanced simultaneously, and decisively took on Cao Xiu's army. Following that, the Wu troops pursued the fleeing Wei forces until they reached Jiashi, where they annihilated some 10,000 enemy soldiers and obtained over 10,000 spoils of war; in addition, all of the Wei army's equipment and weaponry were looted. Lu Xun regrouped his men; and when he passed by Wuchang (武昌; present-day Ezhou, Hubei), Sun Quan instructed his attendants to shield Lu Xun with his own canopy when entering and leaving the palace doors.

Sun Quan bestowed upon Lu Xun as reward were imperial items, precious items of the finest grade. The honours Lu Xun received were matched by no one in that era.

Cao Xiu barely escaped the battlefield with his life. He died some months later from skin infections on his back resulting from the wounds he sustained during the battle.

According to legend, Cao Xiu did not believe Zhou Fang at first. Zhou Fang cut off locks of his hair to prove his "loyalty". In any case, Zhou Fang knew the terrain well, so he started to lead Cao Xiu into a clearing, where Cao Xiu could set up camp. However, before they left, Jia Kui advised Cao Xiu not to trust Zhou Fang. Cao Xiu not only did not heed Jia Kui's words, but went ahead and fell for Zhou Fang's ruse. He also removed Jia Kui from command and moved on with his 70,000 troops.

Jia Kui, who had come along with Cao Xiu, helped Cao Xiu retreat from the ambush. For this, Jia Kui received praise from the Wei emperor Cao Rui. Cao Xiu died shortly after the battle from skin infections on his back resulting from the wounds he sustained during the battle; Jia Kui also died from illness shortly after the battle.
