= Zhuge Dan's Rebellion =

Revolt by Cao Wei general Zhuge Dan against regent Sima Zhao

- Part of the Three Rebellions in Shouchun
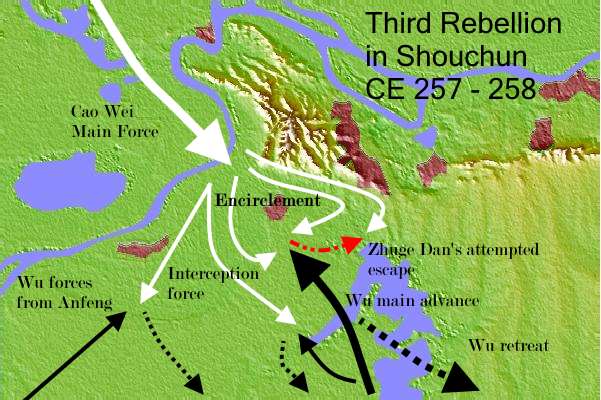
- Map of the rebellion (not drawn to scale)
Date	c. June 257 – March or April 258
Location	around Shou County, Anhui, China
Result	Cao Wei victory

Belligerents
Cao Wei	Zhuge Dan; Eastern Wu

Commanders and leaders
Sima Zhao; Zhong Hui; Hu Fen; Wang Ji	Zhuge Dan †; Sun Chen; Wen Qin (executed); Ding Feng

Strength
260,000	140,000–150,000 (Zhuge Dan), 30,000 (Eastern Wu)

Zhuge Dan's Rebellion, or the Third Rebellion in Shouchun, was a revolt led by Zhuge Dan, a general from the state of Cao Wei, against the regent Sima Zhao. Zhuge Dan received some support from Eastern Wu, Cao Wei's rival state. It was the third and final of a series of three rebellions that took place in Shouchun (壽春; present-day Shou County, Anhui) in the 250s during the Three Kingdoms period of China.

== Background ==
Following the Incident at the Gaoping Tombs in 249, and events of the previous rebellions at Shouchun in 251 and 255, the regency and almost complete control of Wei was in the hands of Sima Zhao and his clan. After the second uprising, Sima Shi died, giving control to his second brother, Sima Zhao. The Wei emperor was Cao Mao, and since Wen Qin fled to Eastern Wu, Shouchun's affairs were given to the Wei general Zhuge Dan. Zhuge Dan had witnessed the rise and fall of both Wang Ling, and Guanqiu Jian, and also played an enormous role in the second revolt in Shouchun. However, as his close friends Xiahou Xuan and Deng Yang had both been executed by the Sima clan, and as he had witnessed the downfall of Wang Ling and Guanqiu Jian, Zhuge Dan felt uneasy. Zhuge Dan began increasing his popularity in the Huai River region, and also hired many bodyguards.

== Trigger ==
In the winter of 256, Eastern Wu sent troops to attack Xuye (徐堨). While Zhuge Dan was able to handle it, he requested 100,000 more troops from the Wei imperial court, and planned to build castles to defend the region. Sima Zhao felt that Zhuge Dan was behaving suspiciously, so he sent his close aide Jia Chong to meet Zhuge Dan and assess whether he was loyal to the Wei emperor Cao Mao or to Sima Zhao. After Jia Chong reported that Zhuge Dan supported the emperor, Sima Zhao sent him an imperial order in the emperor's name, instructing him to return to Luoyang to serve as Minister of Works. (While this appeared to be a promotion for Zhuge Dan, it was actually to remove him from his military command in Shouchun and recall him back to Luoyang, where he would be under Sima Zhao's watch.)

Zhuge Dan knew that Sima Zhao was suspecting him after he received the order. He murdered his immediate superior Yue Lin, the Inspector of Yang Province, seized control of the 40,000 to 50,000 troops stationed there, and rebelled against Sima Zhao. He sent his Chief Clerk Wu Gang (吳綱) to Eastern Wu with his son Zhuge Jing as a hostage, asking for reinforcements from Wu. In response, Wu sent more reinforcements as compared to during the second Shouchun rebellion, giving Zhuge Dan huge numbers. Sima Zhao also mobilised Wei forces from throughout the Wei Empire to suppress Zhuge Dan's rebellion.

== Rebellion ==
=== Wu efforts ===
Sima Zhao's first move was to station a vast army of 260,000 men at Qiutou, a key location near Shouchun. He ordered Wang Ji and Chen Qian to lead a siege unit to Shouchun in an early effort to deal massive casualties in the early part of the uprising. Knowing that Wu was sending massive numbers of soldiers towards the south of Shouchun, Sima Zhao sent a massive number of his troops under Shi Bao and two other generals in an attempt to halt the advance of Wu support forces. The Wu forces led by Wen Qin, who rebelled previously, Quan Yi and Tang Zi predicted this move, and rushed to successfully enter Shouchun before the Wei siege forces could encircle Zhuge Dan. In a counterattack effort, Wen Qin led his men to break out of the siege several times but failed. When this happened, the Wu forces under Zhu Yi also failed in an effort to deal damage to the Wei forces, when he led backup troops from the southwest position of Shouchun at Anfeng garrison, but he was quickly driven off by Wei forces. He managed to escape back to Sun Chen. Sun Chen then had his forces led by Ding Feng, Li Fei, and Zhu Yi to move their forces closer to the direction of Lake Chao, where they would strike the Wei forces at Shouchun to stop the siege. Wei forces quickly moved to intercept their forces on the way upwards towards Shouchun, successfully routing the large chunk of Wu forces Sun Chen sent with them. Morale plummeted on the side of Zhuge Dan and Wu. With back to back futile efforts and defeat, Sun Chen executed Zhu Yi. When they were routed, ironically, the Wu supplies were destroyed in a Wei surprise attack led by Hu Lie. Many troops either surrendered to Sima Zhao's forces or abandoned Wu's ranks. With despair, Sun Chen ordered a departure from Shouchun to return to Jianye, determining that Zhuge Dan had no chance against Wei.

=== Defections ===
Zhuge Dan's forces, still besieged at Shouchun, succeeded in dealing more than minimal casualties towards the Wei forces, but they still were low in morale and suffered heavy casualties. Zhuge Dan's deputies Jiang Ban (蔣班) and Jiao Yi (焦彝) advised him to focus on piercing a single flank of the encirclement to break the siege in an attempt to turn the tide. Wen Qin, who led the Wu forces that were separated from the main force and still remained in combat at Shouchun, strongly disagreed with this plan. He stated that the rest of the Wu troops will soon merge with Zhuge Dan, but he did not realise that Sun Chen had retreated to the Wu capital of Jianye. Zhuge Dan mocked the weak advice of Jiao Yi and Jiang Ban and agreed with Wen Qin. He stated that he was tempted to murder them instead. Jiao Yi and Jiang Ban fearfully managed to defect with a large number of Zhuge Dan's forces, which brought down almost all hope in Zhuge Dan's remaining ranks. Zhong Hui suggested to Sima Zhao to cause more defections in Zhuge Dan's forces by faking letters from Quan Hui (全輝) and Quan Yí (全儀) to have Quan Yī (全禕) and Quan Duan (全端) surrender. Quan Yi soon obtained the letters, and as planned, was tricked into believing the letters were real and immediately surrendered to Sima Zhao the moment he could. Zhuge Dan's forces were taken by surprise and suffered more casualties.

=== Suppression ===
In late February or March 258, the remaining forces under Zhuge Dan, Tang Zi, Wen Qin, and Wen Yang (Wen Qin's son) decided to try to break out of the siege. They were once again defeated quickly and suffered heavy casualties. By then, Zhuge Dan had few forces remaining and the supplies in the city were quickly being depleted. Even more troops then surrendered to Sima Zhao.

Wen Qin intelligently suggested to suspend the northerners under his control and the rest of the Wu forces in the city to conserve supplies. Zhuge Dan ignored Wen Qin's suggestion, accusing him of being a coward and attempting to trick him into getting Wen Qin out of the situation. He then decided to kill Wen Qin. Wen Qin's sons, Wen Yang and Wen Hu, heard of their father's execution and quickly escaped from Shouchun and surrendered to Sima Zhao, who accepted them back into the ranks of Wei despite their father's actions. The defection of Wen Qin's sons caused the rebel army to become entirely demoralised.

Between 22 March and 19 April 258, Wei forces finally attacked and penetrated Zhuge Dan's position in Shouchun. Zhuge Dan, with all hope lost, fled from the city, but he was murdered by Hu Fen (胡奮)'s men during his desperate attempt to escape his fate. The Wu general Yu Quan (于詮) died in battle, while Tang Zi and Wang Zuo (王祚) of Wu surrendered to Sima Zhao along with the rest of Zhuge Dan's few remaining men.

== Aftermath ==
After the rebellion was quashed, Sima Zhao was seen as a hero in the state of Wei and finally regained the trust and companionship of most of the Wei personages. Cao Mao later attempted to murder Sima Zhao, but was instead killed himself during the coup.

This was the last uprising in Shouchun, giving the opportunity for the rest of the Wei forces to focus on total invasion of Shu.

== Order of battle ==
Wei forces

- Sima Zhao
  - Wang Ji
  - Chen Qian (陳鶱)
  - Zhong Hui
  - Shi Bao (石苞)
  - Hu Zhi (胡質)
    - Li Guang (李广), general, executed by Sima Zhao
    - Chang Shi (常时), administrator of Taishan, executed by Sima Zhao
  - Zhou Tai
  - Hu Fen (胡奮)
  - Sima Liang (司马亮)

Zhuge Dan's and Eastern Wu's forces

- † Zhuge Dan
  - (surrendered) Jiang Ban (蔣班)
  - (surrendered) Jiao Yi (焦彝)
- Sun Chen
  - Zhu Yi, executed by Sun Chen
  - Ding Feng
  - Li Fei (黎斐)
  - (executed) Wen Qin, executed by Zhuge Dan
    - (surrendered) Wen Yang
    - (surrendered) Wen Hu
  - (surrendered) Quan Yì (全懌)
  - (surrendered) Quan Duan (全端)
  - (surrendered) Tang Zi
  - (surrendered) Wang Zuo (王祚)
  - † Yu Quan (于詮)

== In popular culture ==
Zhuge Dan's Rebellion, along with Wang Ling's Rebellion and Guanqiu Jian and Wen Qin's Rebellion, are featured as playable stages in Koei Tecmo's Dynasty Warriors video game series. It made its first appearance in Dynasty Warriors 7.

== See also ==
- Conquest of Shu by Wei
- Coup of Cao Mao
- Incident at Gaoping Tombs
- Three Rebellions in Shouchun
