= Three Rebellions in Shouchun =

Revolts in the state of Cao Wei (251-258)

- Part of the wars of the Three Kingdoms period
Date	First rebellion: 7–15 June 251; Second rebellion: 5 February – 11 March 255; Third rebellion: June 257 – March or April 258
Location	Shouchun (present-day Shou County, Anhui, China)
Result	Rebellions suppressed; Sima clan strengthened control over imperial authority of Cao Wei

Belligerents
First rebellion: Wang Ling; Second rebellion: Guanqiu Jian; Wen Qin; Third rebellion: Zhuge Dan; Eastern Wu	Cao Wei

Commanders and leaders
First rebellion: Wang Ling (surrendered); Second rebellion: Guanqiu Jian †; Wen Qin; Third rebellion: Zhuge Dan †; Sun Chen	First rebellion: Sima Yi; Second rebellion: Sima Shi; Deng Ai; Zhuge Dan; Third rebellion: Sima Zhao; Zhong Hui; Hu Fen; Wang Ji

Three Rebellions in Shouchun
- Traditional Chinese: 壽春三叛
- Simplified Chinese: 寿春三叛
Transcriptions
Standard Mandarin
- Hanyu Pinyin: Shòuchūn Sān Pàn

Three Rebellions in Huainan
- Traditional Chinese: 淮南三叛
- Simplified Chinese: 淮南三叛
Transcriptions
Standard Mandarin
- Hanyu Pinyin: Huáinán Sān Pàn

The Three Rebellions in Shouchun (also known as the Three Rebellions in Huainan) were a series of revolts that occurred in the state of Cao Wei during the Three Kingdoms period. The rebellions broke out in the later years of Wei when the Sima clan, headed by Sima Yi, usurped state power. The military governors of Shouchun (present-day Shou County, Anhui) rose in revolt thrice in the name of a rebellion to oust the Sima clan from power. The respective leaders of the three rebellions were Wang Ling, Guanqiu Jian and Wen Qin, and Zhuge Dan. All the revolts were eventually suppressed.

== Background ==
In 249, during the Incident at the Gaoping Tombs, Sima Yi seized power from Cao Shuang in a coup d'état and had Cao Shuang's entire clan executed. Since then, the Wei government was effectively controlled by the Sima clan. After Sima Yi's death in 251, the power was inherited by his eldest son Sima Shi, and was later passed on to his second son Sima Zhao when Sima Shi died in 255.

== The rebellions ==
=== Wang Ling's Rebellion ===
After the Incident at the Gaoping Tombs, Sima Yi promoted Wang Ling, the general in charge of Shouchun, to the rank of Grand Commandant (太尉). Wang Ling and his nephew Linghu Yu (令狐愚) felt that the emperor Cao Fang was too young to rule, and saw that Sima Yi was actually the one in control of state power. They planned to depose Cao Fang and replace him with Cao Biao, the Prince of Chu. Linghu Yu sent his subordinate Zhang Shi (張式) to contact Cao Biao.

In the spring of 251, Wang Ling seized the opportunity to send a petition to the Wei court, asking for permission to attack Eastern Wu forces in Tushui (塗水). The campaign against Wu was actually a mask for Wang Ling's intention to rebel. Wang Ling did not receive any reply so he sent Yang Hong (楊弘) to inform Huang Hua (黃華), the Inspector of Yan Province, of their plans, in the hope that Huang would support him. However, Yang Hong and Huang Hua reported Wang Ling to Sima Yi instead. News of the revolt reached the Wei emperor Cao Fang in June 251. Sima Yi then personally led an army to suppress the revolt. Wang Ling was aware that he was outmatched so he agreed to surrender after Sima Yi promised to pardon him for treason. Wang Ling knew that he would be sentenced to death anyway, so he committed suicide on 15 June 251 while being escorted to the capital Luoyang. Wang Ling's clan was also exterminated and Cao Biao was ordered to take his own life.

=== Guanqiu Jian and Wen Qin's Rebellion ===
Sima Yi died in 251 and his eldest son Sima Shi inherited his position in the Wei imperial court. In 254, Li Feng, Xiahou Xuan and Zhang Ji (張緝) planned to overthrow Sima Shi, but their plan was leaked out and they were all executed. The emperor Cao Fang was unhappy with Sima Shi's authoritarian attitude and incurred the latter's displeasure. Months later, Sima Shi deposed Cao Fang and replaced him with Cao Mao. Guanqiu Jian, who was stationed in Shouchun, and Wen Qin, the Inspector of Yang Province, heard news about the deaths of Li Feng, Xiahou Xuan and Zhang Ji, and became afraid of being implicated. Guanqiu Jian's son Guanqiu Xun kept urging his father to stage an uprising to defend their state's sovereignty from Sima Shi.

The following year, Guanqiu Jian and Wen Qin rose in revolt in Shouchun against Sima Shi and attacked Xiangcheng (present-day Xiangcheng City, Henan). News of the revolt reached Eastern Wu, and the Wu emperor Sun Liang sent troops to support Guanqiu Jian. The Wu forces were led by their chancellor Sun Jun, Lü Ju and Liu Zan. Sima Shi personally led an army to suppress the revolt. He sent Wang Ji, the Inspector of Jing Province, to capture Nandun (南頓) before the rebels did. The armies led by Zhuge Dan, Hu Zun (胡遵) and Deng Ai arrived and merged with Sima Shi's main force. Sima Shi ordered his troops not to advance any further. Guanqiu Jian and Wen Qin were unable to engage the enemy and were worried that they might be ambushed if they retreated back to Shouchun. As most of the rebels' families were in the region north of the Huai River, their morale gradually plunged and they deserted. Only newly recruited civilians remained in the rebel army.

At the same time, Deng Ai led his troops to garrison at Yuejia (樂嘉). Guanqiu Jian saw that Deng Ai's army was quite weak so he sent Wen Qin to attack. When Wen Qin reached there he saw that Sima Shi's main army had arrived so he ordered a retreat. Sima Shi sent his Chief Clerk Sima Ban (司馬班) to give chase. Wen Qin's army was routed and he managed to escape barely as his son Wen Yang fought bravely to protect him. The palace guard Yin Damu (尹大目) caught up with Wen Qin and attempted to persuade him to surrender but Wen refused. When Guanqiu Jian heard of Wen Qin's defeat, he escaped at night and his army was disbanded. Guanqiu Jian was later killed by a civilian called Zhang Shu (張屬) in Shen County (慎縣) and his head sent to the capital Luoyang. When Wen Qin returned to Xiang County (項縣) he saw that Shouchun had fallen to Zhuge Dan and the rebel army had disbanded. He fled to Eastern Wu. When the Wu forces led by Sun Jun arrived at Dongxing (present-day Dongxing, Guangxi), they heard that Shouchun had been overtaken by Zhuge Dan so they retreated as well. Zhuge Dan sent Jiang Ban (蔣班) to pursue and attack the retreating Wu forces. The Wu general Liu Zan was killed in the ensuing battle.

=== Zhuge Dan's Rebellion ===
Not long after the revolt by Guanqiu Jian and Wen Qin was suppressed, Sima Shi died of illness and his second brother Sima Zhao inherited his place in the Wei court. Shouchun was guarded by Zhuge Dan after the second rebellion was suppressed. Zhuge Dan had witnessed the deaths of Wang Ling and Guanqiu Jian after their failed rebellions and he felt uneasy. He tried to increase his popularity amongst the people in the Huai River region and gain their support. At the same time, he hired a group of bodyguards to protect himself.

Sima Zhao wanted to eliminate the remaining loyalists to the state, so he heeded Jia Chong's advice to force Zhuge Dan to rebel. Zhuge Dan received an imperial decree to report to the Wei court and assume the post of Excellency of Works. However, Zhuge Dan became afraid after receiving the decree, so he killed Yue Lin, the Inspector of Yang Province, and rebelled against Sima Zhao. He sent his Chief Clerk Wu Gang (吳綱) to Eastern Wu with his son Zhuge Jing as a hostage, asking for reinforcements from Wu.

Sima Zhao personally led 260,000 troops to suppress the rebellion and stationed his army in Qiutou (丘頭). He sent Wang Ji and Chen Qian (陳騫) to lead an army to besiege Shouchun. He sent Shi Bao (石苞), Hu Zhi (胡質) and Zhou Tai to hold off the Wu forces. The Wu forces led by Wen Qin, Tang Zi and Quan Yì (全懌) managed to enter Shouchun before the encirclement by the Wei forces was completed. Subsequently, Wen Qin led his men to break out of the siege several times but failed. The Wu general Zhu Yi garrisoned at Anfeng (安豐), southwest of Shouchun, as backup, but was defeated by Zhou Tai. Sun Chen moved his army to Chao Lake. He sent Zhu Yi, along with Ding Feng and Li Fei (黎斐) to break the siege on Shouchun, but were defeated by Shi Bao and Zhou Tai. The Wei general Hu Lie (胡烈) led a surprise attack on the Wu forces and succeeded in destroying the enemy's supplies.

Zhu Yi's army was unable to advance any further as they had lost their supplies. Sun Chen was furious and had Zhu Yi executed. Sun Chen then ordered a retreat to the Wu capital Jianye (present-day Nanjing, Jiangsu). Zhuge Dan's forces were besieged in Shouchun for a long time without any reinforcements arriving. Zhuge Dan's deputies Jiang Ban (蔣班) and Jiao Yi (焦彝) advised him to concentrate on attacking a single flank of the encirclement to break the siege. Wen Qin opposed the suggestion and insisted that Wu reinforcements will arrive soon. Zhuge Dan did not heed Jiang Ban and Jiao Yi's advice and wanted to kill them instead. Jiang Ban and Jiao Yi escaped from Shouchun and defected over to Sima Zhao's side. Sima Zhao followed Zhong Hui's strategy, by faking letters from Quan Hui (全輝) and Quan Yí (全儀) to trick Quan Yī (全禕) and Quan Duan (全端) to surrender. When Quan Yī received the letters, he thought that they were real and surrendered to Sima Zhao. Zhuge Dan's forces were taken by surprise.

In February 258, Zhuge Dan, Wen Qin and Tang Zi attempted to break out of the siege again but failed and suffered heavy casualties. By then, supplies in the city were running out soon and several troops had surrendered. Wen Qin suggested releasing the northerners and Wu forces in the city to conserve supplies. Zhuge Dan ignored Wen Qin's suggestion and had him killed in anger. Wen Qin's sons, Wen Yang and Wen Hu, heard of their father's death and escaped from Shouchun and surrendered to Sima Zhao. The surrender of Wen Yang and Wen Hu caused the rebel army's morale to further plummet. In March or April 258, Sima Zhao's forces succeeded in penetrating Shouchun. Zhuge Dan fled from the city and was killed by Hu Fen (胡奮)'s men during his escape. The Wu general Yu Quan was killed in battle while Tang Zi and Wang Zuo (王祚) of Wu surrendered to Sima Zhao.

== Aftermath ==
The failure of the three rebellions strengthened the influence of the Sima clan in Wei as several loyalists to the state were eliminated. After the rebellions, most officials in Wei turned to support Sima Zhao. In June 260, the emperor Cao Mao led a coup to oust Sima Zhao from power but failed and was killed by Sima's men. In 263, Wei invaded Shu and annexed it within a year. Not long after Sima Zhao's death in September 265, his son Sima Yan forced the last Wei ruler Cao Huan to abdicate in his favour in February 266, thus ending Wei's existence and founding the Western Jin dynasty, which united the land after Wu, the last of the Three Kingdoms, surrendered in May 280.

== Order of battle ==
=== Wang Ling's Rebellion ===
Wang Ling's forces

- Wang Ling (surrendered)
  - Wang Huo (王彧) (surrendered)
- Cao Biao, Prince of Chu
- Linghu Yu (令狐愚)
  - Zhang Shi (張式)

Wei forces

- Sima Yi

=== Guanqiu Jian and Wen Qin's Rebellion ===
Guanqiu Jian and Wen Qin's forces

- Guanqiu Jian †
  - Guanqiu Xiu (毌丘秀), escaped to Wu
  - Guanqiu Zhong (毌丘重), escaped to Wu
- Wen Qin, escaped to Wu
  - Wen Yang, escaped to Wu

Wu forces

- Sun Jun
  - Lü Ju
  - Liu Zan †

Wei forces

- Sima Shi
  - Sima Ban (司馬班)
  - Yin Damu (尹大目)
  - Deng Ai
  - Wang Ji
  - Zhuge Dan
    - Jiang Ban (蔣班)
  - Hu Zun (胡遵)

=== Zhuge Dan's Rebellion ===
Zhuge Dan's forces

- Zhuge Dan †
  - Jiang Ban (蔣班) (surrendered)
  - Jiao Yi (焦彝) (surrendered)

Wu forces

- Sun Chen
  - Zhu Yi, executed by Sun Chen
  - Ding Feng
  - Li Fei (黎斐)
  - Wen Qin, executed by Zhuge Dan
    - Wen Yang (surrendered)
    - Wen Hu (surrendered)
  - Quan Yì (全懌) (surrendered)
  - Quan Duan (全端) (surrendered)
  - Tang Zi (surrendered)
  - Wang Zuo (王祚) (surrendered)
  - Yu Quan †

Wei forces

- Sima Zhao
  - Zhong Hui
  - Wang Ji
  - Chen Qian (陳鶱)
  - Shi Bao (石苞)
  - Hu Zhi (胡質)
  - Zhou Tai
  - Hu Lie (胡烈)
  - Hu Fen (胡奮)

== In popular culture ==
All the three rebellions are featured as playable stages in the seventh installment of Koei's Dynasty Warriors video game series.

== See also ==
- Incident at the Gaoping Tombs
- Conquest of Shu by Wei
- Conquest of Wu by Jin
