= Guanqiu Jian and Wen Qin's Rebellion =

Uprising by Cao Wei generals Guanqiu Jian and Wen Qin against regent Sima Shi (255)

- Part of the Three Rebellions in Shouchun
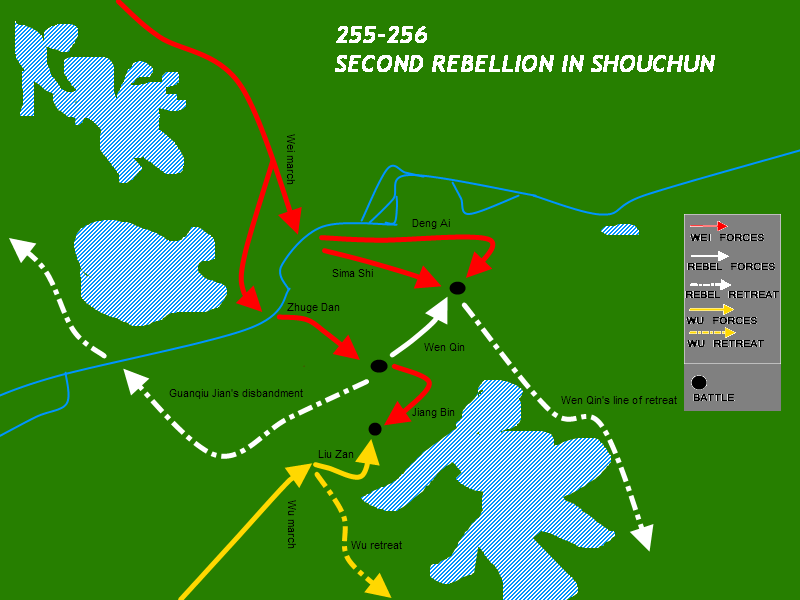
Date	5 February – 11 March 255 (Note: Cao Mao's biography in the Sanguozhi recorded that Guanqiu Jian and Wen Qin declared their rebellion on the yichou day of the 1st month of the 2nd year of the Zhengyuan era of Cao Mao's reign. The rebellion was crushed on the jihai day of the leap month in that year. These dates correspond to 5 February 255 and 11 March 255 in the Gregorian calendar.)
Location	Shouchun, Anhui, China
Result	Cao Wei victory, Guanqiu Jian slain, Wen Qin and family fled to Wu.

Belligerents
Cao Wei	Guanqiu Jian; Wen Qin; Eastern Wu

Commanders and leaders
Sima Shi; Deng Ai; Zhuge Dan	Guanqiu Jian †; Wen Qin; Sun Jun

Strength
At least 4,000 troops under Jiang Ban	

Guanqiu Jian and Wen Qin's Rebellion, or the Second Rebellion in Shouchun, was a punitive uprising led by Guanqiu Jian and Wen Qin, two generals from the state of Cao Wei, against the regent Sima Shi and his clan. This was the second of a series of three rebellions that all took place in Shouchun (壽春; present-day Shou County, Lu'an, Anhui) in the 250s during the Three Kingdoms period in Chinese history.

== Background ==
In 249, the Wei regent Sima Yi seized power from his co-regent, Cao Shuang, at the Incident at Gaoping Tombs and completely controlled the Wei government. His eldest son, Sima Shi, who succeeded him, deposed the Wei emperor Cao Fang in 254 and replaced him with Cao Mao upon discovering Cao Fang's plot to return power back to the imperial family. The generals Guanqiu Jian and Wen Qin, who were stationed in Shouchun, were disgruntled with the Simas and decided to rebel only months after the installment of Cao Mao to the Wei throne.

== Planning ==
When Guanqiu Jian and Wen Qin rebelled, they decided to secretly obtain masses of troops without giving away that their intentions were to revolt. They sent a messenger to Zhuge Dan to recruit and levy heavy quantities from Yu Province. Finding that this was an unreasonable request, Zhuge Dan deduced that they were plotting a revolt and had the messenger executed.

== Rebellion ==
News of the uprising quickly reached Wei's rival state, Eastern Wu, which had long desired Shouchun. The Wu emperor Sun Liang sent troops to aid Guanqiu Jian and Wen Qin to weaken the Wei forces. Sun Jun led the support forces with Liu Zan and Lü Ju. Sima Shi, Hu Zun, Deng Ai, and Zhuge Dan merged forces and marched upon the rebels. Wang Ji, the Inspector of Jing Province, sought to capture Nandun before Guanqiu Jian and Wen Qin could do so. Sima Shi wanted to wait until all the mobilized Wei forces had arrived before launching an attack on Shouchun, so he denied Wang Ji permission to attack first. Wang Ji saw this was a unwise move and led troops to attack Nandun. Soon after Wang Ji took over the area, a force led by Guanqiu Jian arrived but on seeing Wang Ji was already there, pulled back quickly. Everyone saw that Wang Ji had been right, so nothing was done about him disobeying orders. The Wei army then halted and mobilised, successfully instilling fear in movements in the rebel army, which would ultimately end their uprising. The Huai River northern region was where the rebels' families were, which brought down the rebels' morale. Troops abandoned Guanqiu Jian and Wen Qin. When Sima Shi saw this, Deng Ai was ordered to take his forces into Yuejia garrison, with a mere number of troops. He then fooled Wen Qin into attacking it, with Wen Qin thinking that there was only a small force there. That night, Sima Shi was able to bring his main force to reinforce Luojia, without Wen Qin knowing, though a pontoon bridge. Wen Qin sent his son, Wen Yang, to attack the city in the night. As a result, Wen Yang threw himself against a massive force of more than 100,000 men and was completely unsuccessful. When morning came, Wen Qin saw how large the army against him suddenly was and he fled. He ordered a retreat but was ultimately routed by Sima Ban. This caused a massive amount of Shouchun's population to flee to Wu in fear that they would be massacred. The rest of the rebels disbanded, and Guanqiu Jian was murdered in Shen County by Zhang Shu. Wen Qin immediately fled to Wu. By the time Wen Qin had reached Xiang county, Shouchun, and the rest of the Huai River region, was captured by Zhuge Dan. The Wu forces by this time had not yet arrived, so they quickly ordered a retreat from Dongxing. Zhuge Dan sent troops to attack the Wu forces, killing Liu Zan and many of their troops.

== Aftermath ==
Wen Qin and his family successfully retreated to Wu, but was killed by Zhuge Dan when the latter rebelled a few years later. Sima Shi was young and had no heirs, so the regency was given to his second brother, Sima Zhao. Sima Zhao quelled a third rebellion in Shouchun led by Zhuge Dan a few years later, and later launched the conquest of Shu a few years later. Then Sima Zhao died and the regency was given to his son, Sima Yan. Sima Yan then quickly had Cao Huan abdicate the Wei throne to him, establishing the Jin dynasty. In 280, Wu fell to Jin and the Three Kingdoms period ended.

== Order of battle ==
Guanqiu Jian and Wen Qin forces

- † Guanqiu Jian
  - Guanqiu Xiu (毌丘秀), escaped to Wu
  - Guanqiu Zhong (毌丘重), escaped to Wu
- Wen Qin, escaped to Wu
  - Wen Yang, escaped to Wu

Wu forces

- Sun Jun
  - Lü Ju
  - † Liu Zan
  - Lu Kai

Wei forces

- Sima Shi
  - Sima Ban (司馬班)
  - Yin Damu (尹大目)
  - Deng Ai
  - Wang Ji
  - Zhuge Dan
    - Jiang Ban (蔣班)
  - Hu Zun (胡遵)

== In popular culture ==
This stage, along with the other two rebellions, are all featured as playable stages during the Jin Story Mode in the Dynasty Warriors video game series. It made its first appearance in 7.

== See also ==
- Three Rebellions in Shouchun
- Punitive war
- Conquest of Shu by Wei
- Guanqiu Jian
- Wen Qin
