= Wang Ji (Three Kingdoms) =

Chinese Cao Wei general (190-261)

- 王基
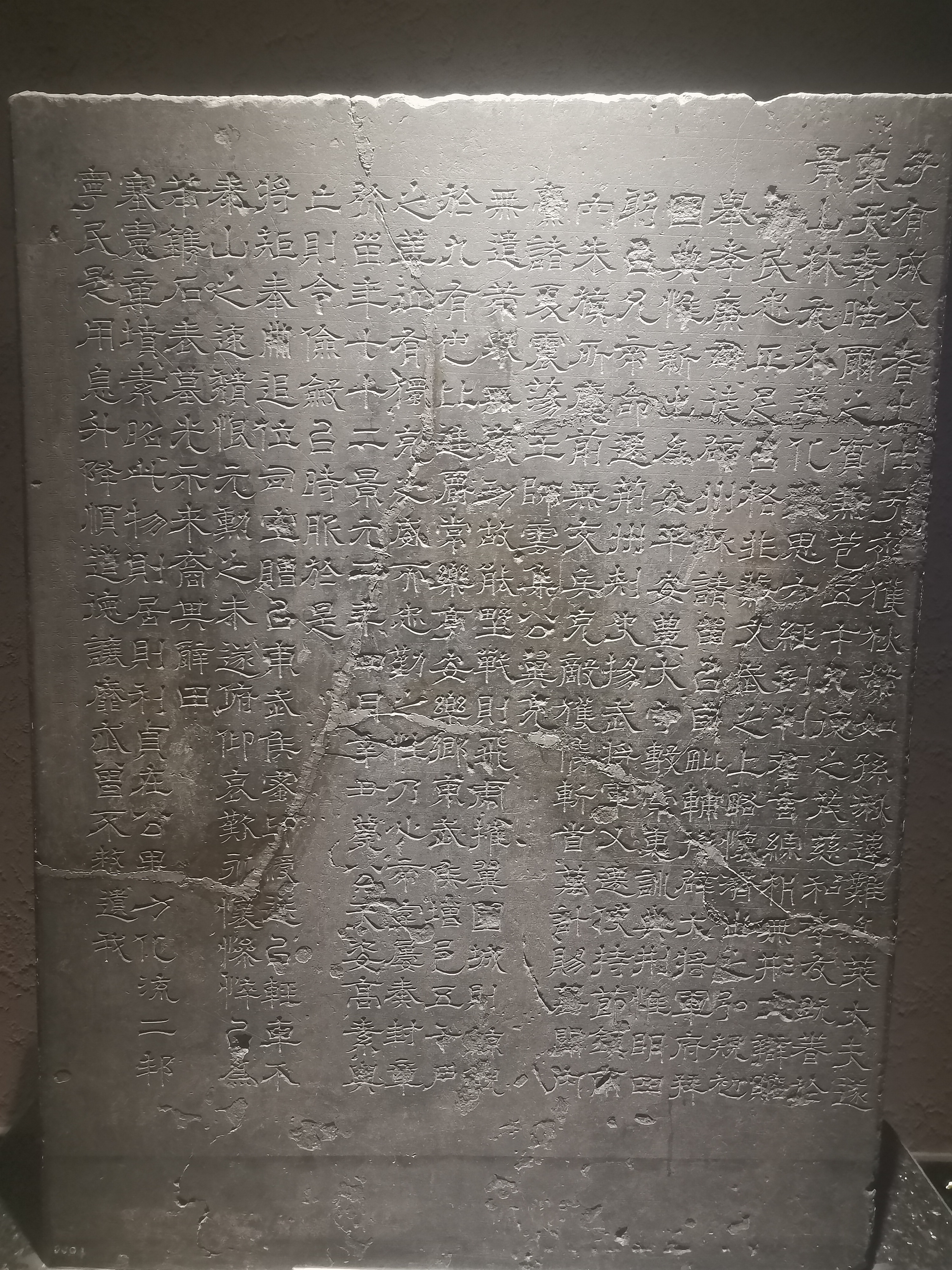
- Wang Ji's tombstone (now kept in Luoyang Museum)

General Who Attacks the South (征南將軍)
- In office 259 – 261
- Monarch: Cao Mao / Cao Huan

General Who Attacks the East (征東將軍)
- In office 258 – 259
- Monarch: Cao Mao

General Who Guards the East (鎮東將軍) (acting)
- In office 257 – 258
- Monarch: Cao Mao

Inspector of Yu Province (豫州刺史) (acting)
- In office 255 – 257
- Monarch: Cao Mao

General Who Guards the South (鎮南將軍)
- In office 255 – 257
- Monarch: Cao Mao

General Who Spreads Vehemence (揚烈將軍)
- In office 250 – 255
- Monarch: Cao Fang

Inspector of Jing Province (荊州刺史)
- In office 250 – 255
- Monarch: Cao Fang

General Who Attacks Rebels (討寇將軍)
- In office ? – 249
- Monarch: Cao Fang

Administrator of Anfeng (安豐太守)
- In office ? – 249
- Monarch: Cao Fang

Administrator of Anping (安平太守)
- In office ?–?
- Monarch: Cao Rui

Personal details
- Born: 190 (Note: Wang Ji's tombstone recorded that he died on the xinchou day of the 4th month in the 2nd year of the Jingyuan era of Cao Huan's reign at the age of 72 (by East Asian age reckoning). This date corresponds to 9 June 261 in the Gregorian calendar. By calculation, his year of birth should be 190.); Zhaoyuan, Shandong
- Died: 9 June 261 (aged 71)
- Resting place: Luoyang, Henan
- Children: Wang Hui; Wang Can
- Parent: Wang Bao (father)
- Relatives: Wang Weng (uncle); Wang Qiao (cousin)
- Occupation: General
- Courtesy name: Boyu (伯輿)
- Posthumous name: Marquis Jing (景侯)
- Peerage: Marquis of Anle District (安樂鄉侯); Marquis of Dongwu (东武侯)

Wang Ji (190 – 9 June 261), courtesy name Boyu, posthumously known as Marquis Jing of Dongwu, was a military general of the state of Cao Wei during the Three Kingdoms period of China. He started his career as a low-ranking official under Wang Ling, the governor of Qing Province. During this time, he was noted for exemplary performance and was later transferred to the central government in Luoyang. He was subsequently promoted to the position of a commandery administrator, but was briefly removed from office when the Wei regent Sima Yi ousted his co-regent Cao Shuang in a coup d'état in 249. However, he was quickly recalled to government service, promoted to the position of governor of Jing Province and appointed as a military general. From 251 until his death in 261, Wang Ji maintained close but professional working relationships with the Wei regents Sima Shi and Sima Zhao. During this time, he supervised military operations in Jing, Yu and Yang provinces, and defended Wei's eastern and southern borders against attacks by Wei's rival state, Eastern Wu. He also assisted Sima Shi and Sima Zhao in suppressing two of the three Shouchun rebellions in 255 and 257–258 respectively. In 261, in the months just before his death, he correctly pointed out that two Eastern Wu military officers were pretending to defect to Wei, and managed to stop the Wei forces from falling into a trap.

== Early life ==
Wang Ji was from Qucheng County (曲城縣), Donglai Commandery (東萊郡), which is located northwest of present-day Zhaoyuan, Shandong. He was born in 190 towards the end of the Eastern Han dynasty. As he lost his father at a young age, he was raised by his uncle Wang Weng (王翁), who treated him well. In return, Wang Ji was very filial towards his uncle.

When Wang Ji turned 16, the local commandery office recruited him to serve as an assistant official. He quit later after realising that he was not interested in the job. He then went to Langya Commandery (琅邪郡; around present-day Linyi, Shandong) for further studies under the Confucian scholar Zheng Xuan.

== As Wang Ling's subordinate ==
Sometime between 220 and 226, the administrative office of Donglai Commandery nominated Wang Ji as a xiaolian (civil service candidate) to the central government of the Cao Wei state. Wang Ji was subsequently appointed him as a Gentleman Cadet (郎中). Around the time, Wang Ling, who had recently assumed office as the Inspector (刺史) of Qing Province, recruited Wang Ji to serve as an attendant officer (別駕) under him. Later, when Wang Ji was summoned to the imperial capital Luoyang to serve as a librarian (秘書郎), Wang Ling successfully sought permission from the central government to let Wang Ji remain in Qing Province.

Wang Lang, the Minister over the Masses, once asked Wang Ling to transfer Wang Ji to his office in Luoyang. When Wang Ling refused, Wang Lang wrote to the imperial court to accuse Wang Ling of holding back talents: "Street-level officials who have performed exceptionally well should be promoted to commandery level. Commandery-level officials who have shown good performance should be recommended to the central government. This practice originated from the ancient custom of nobles presenting local talents to their rulers. I have never heard of any regional official refusing to allow his subordinates to serve in the central government." Despite Wang Lang's accusation, Wang Ling refused to allow Wang Ji to leave. Throughout his tenure in Qing Province, much of Wang Ling's achievements were actually due to Wang Ji's efforts.

== Service in the central government ==
Sometime between 230 and 235, (Note: Sima Yi held the position of General-in-Chief from 230 to 235.) Sima Yi, the General-in-Chief (大將軍) of Wei, summoned Wang Ji to serve under him. Wang Ling had no choice but to let Wang Ji leave. Before Wang Ji reached Sima Yi's office, however, he was quickly reassigned to be a Palace Writer Gentleman (中書侍郎).

During his reign from 226 to 239, the Wei emperor Cao Rui started lavish and extravagant palace-building projects. As these projects were labour intensive, they took a heavy toll on the common people, who were recruited as labourers for the projects. Wang Ji wrote a memorial to Cao Rui to advise him to stop the projects:

"I heard that the ancients used water as an analogy to describe the people: 'While water may keep a boat afloat, it can also sink it.' The wisest of rulers have always heeded this warning. All is well when the people have a happy and peaceful life. If life becomes hard for them, they will think of rebelling. That was why the Previous Emperor advocated frugality and simplicity; he wanted to prevent a popular uprising. Yan Yuan once said that when Dongyezi continued to push the horses beyond exhaustion while driving a carriage, he knew that he was going to fail. Now, the palace-building projects are so costly and heavy that they have caused families to break up and incurred much resentment from the people. I hope that Your Majesty will learn from Dongyezi's mistake, think about the analogy of water and people, give the exhausted horses some time to recover, and reduce the burden on the people. In the early Han dynasty, from Emperor Xiaowen's time onwards, only members of the imperial clan could become nobles. Jia Yi became worried and he said, 'You still think you are safe when you are sleeping on top of a pile of lighted firewood.' As of today, our enemies have yet to be eliminated while our fearsome generals command large armies. It will be even more difficult to deal with them if they join forces against us. In the long term, it will be even harder for this dynasty to last long. If one does not remain vigilant and focus on eliminating threats in an age of prosperity, and his descendants continue to be complacent, then it will not be long before disaster befalls this state. If Jia Yi were to return from the dead and see what is happening now, he would be even more worried."

Wang Su was known for writing commentaries and annotations on Confucian texts, as well as for expressing his opinions on imperial protocol, etiquette and customs. His views deviated largely from those of the Confucian scholar Zheng Xuan. As Wang Ji studied and followed Zheng Xuan's teachings, he often challenged and disagreed with Wang Su.

Wang Ji was subsequently promoted to the position of Administrator (太守) of Anping Commandery (安平郡; around present-day Hengshui, Hebei). He resigned later because of official reasons.

== As the Administrator of Anfeng ==
Sometime between 239 and 249, (Note: Cao Shuang held the position of General-in-Chief from 239 to 249.) Cao Shuang, the General-in-Chief (大將軍) of Wei, summoned Wang Ji to serve as an Assistant Gentleman (從事中郎) under him. Wang Ji was later promoted to the position of Administrator (太守) of Anfeng Commandery (安豐郡; around present-day Lu'an, Anhui).

During his tenure, Wang Ji governed his jurisdiction strictly but fairly. He also performed some acts of kindness from time to time to win popular support from the masses. As Anfeng Commandery was located near the border between Wei and its rival state Eastern Wu, Wang Ji also set up and strengthened its defences to deter the enemy. He was subsequently given an additional appointment as General Who Attacks Rebels (討寇將軍).

Sometime between 245 and 252, (Note: Lu Xun died in 245 while Sun Quan died in 252. Based on Wang Ji's response to Zhuge Dan, these events took place between 245 and 252.) there were reports of Eastern Wu forces mobilising and gathering at the Wu imperial capital, Jianye (present-day Nanjing, Jiangsu). The Wu forces also publicly revealed that they were preparing to attack Wei territories in Yang Province. Zhuge Dan, the Wei governor of Yang Province, sought Wang Ji's opinion on how to counter a Wu invasion. Wang Ji replied:

"In the past, Sun Quan attacked Hefei and Jiangxia, Quan Cong attacked Lujiang and Zhu Ran attacked Xiangyang, but they all gained nothing from these battles. Now, Lu Xun and the others are already dead; Sun Quan is in his old age and he has neither a wise heir apparent nor a brilliant chief strategist to count on. If Sun Quan personally leads his troops to attack us, he will be more worried about the possibility of internal conflict, stemming from factionalism among his subjects, breaking out while he is away attacking us. If he lets his generals lead his troops to attack us, he has no veteran generals left to rely on, and he does not fully trust his new generals. What he is actually trying to do is to reshuffle his government and place people he trusts into key appointments, so as to ensure the long-term survivability of his regime."

As Wang Ji analysed correctly, Sun Quan did not launch any attack on Wei during this time.

When Cao Shuang was regent of Wei from 239 to 249, he monopolised power and practised cronyism, which resulted in political corruption and cultural decadence. Wang Ji wrote a text, "Shi Yao Lun" (時要論; "Essay on the Needs of the Time"), to express his views on contemporary politics. He then resigned from his post as the Administrator of Anfeng Commandery, using poor health as an excuse. He was soon recalled by the Wei government to serve as the Intendant of Henan (河南尹). However, before he assumed office, Cao Shuang was ousted from power in a coup d'état by his co-regent, Sima Yi, and executed along with the rest of his family and associates. As Wang Ji used to be a subordinate of Cao Shuang, he was implicated in the purge and removed from office.

== As the Inspector of Jing Province ==
Within the same year (249) after his removal from office, Wang Ji was summoned back to serve as a Master of Writing (尚書) in the imperial secretariat. In the following year, he was promoted to Inspector (刺史) of Jing Province and appointed as General Who Spreads Vehemence (揚烈將軍). Shortly after he assumed office, the Wei government ordered him to join the Wei general Wang Chang on a campaign against Eastern Wu.

During the battle, Wang Ji led an army to attack Wu forces led by Bu Xie at Yiling County (夷陵縣; in present-day Yichang, Hubei). Bu Xie and his men retreated behind the city walls, shut the gates and refused to engage Wang Ji in battle. Wang Ji then ordered his troops to pretend to prepare to attack the city, while secretly sending them to capture the Wu army's granary at Xiongfu (雄父). They managed to seize over 300,000 hu of grain and capture a Wu general, Tan Zheng (譚正). Thousands of Wu civilians surrendered to the Wei forces; Wang Ji made arrangements for them to be resettled in Yiling County. The Wei government awarded Wang Ji the title of a Secondary Marquis (關內侯) to honour him for his achievements.

Wang Ji wrote to Wang Chang and managed to convince him to relocate his base of operations to Jiangxia Commandery (江夏郡; around present-day Yunmeng County, Hubei), so that it was nearer to the Wei–Wu border at Xiakou (夏口; in present-day Wuhan, Hubei). After that, the Wu forces did not dare to readily cross the river to attack Wei territory as they did before.

During his tenure as the Inspector of Jing Province, Wang Jing governed his jurisdiction justly and fairly, maintained good discipline within the army and agricultural sector, and built many schools to promote education. He earned much praise from the residents of Jing Province.

Around the time, the Wei government wanted to launch a military campaign against Eastern Wu, so they ordered Wang Ji to come up with a strategy. Wang Ji said:

"If we launch a campaign now and fail to conquer Wu, we will not only lose morale but also waste resources. Therefore, we should attack only when we are well-prepared. If we do not build more canals, stockpile more food supplies and construct more warships, even if we station troops north of the river, we will not gain any strategic advantage. Now, Jiangling has thousands of mu of farmland irrigated by the Ju and Zhang rivers. We also have fertile lands around Anlu. We should focus on developing a strong agricultural production base, make sufficient preparations, then send our troops to attack Jiangling and Yiling, and then capture Xiakou and use the Ju and Zhang rivers to transport food supplies. The enemy's morale will fall when they see that we are well-prepared and have made use of the geography to our advantage. By then, more of them will start defecting to our side. We can then ally with the indigenous tribes in Wu and work together with them to bring down the Wu regime. We should then split up our troops to occupy the lands north of Xiakou and capture the Wu territories beyond the Yangtze. In doing so, we will cut off connections between Wu and Shu and block them from sending reinforcements to help each other. When that happens, Wu will become easy prey for us. At the moment, I do not think it is time for us to attack Wu yet."

The campaign was thus aborted. When Sima Shi succeeded his father Sima Yi as the regent of Wei in 251, Wang Ji wrote to him:

"The Empire is vast and large. There are so many important issues to handle. You have to constantly be on your toes and be very diligent. If your ambitions are noble and upright, you will not have any evil thoughts. If you heart is pure and calm, you will not feel disturbed by the many voices around you. If you are thoughtful and careful, you will not find giving direction and orders to be a difficult task. If you make good use of wise, capable and talented people, you will earn the respect of everyone regardless of where they are. Your actions will affect how people perceive you, while your thoughtfulness will determine how well you can maintain internal stability. Xu Yun, Fu Jia, Yuan Kan and Cui Zan are righteous men of good moral character. You can work closely with them on policy matters."

Sima Shi accepted Wang Ji's advice.

In 254, after Sima Shi deposed the Wei emperor Cao Fang and replaced him with Cao Mao, Wang Ji was elevated from the status of a secondary marquis to a village marquis under the title "Marquis of Changle Village" (常樂亭侯).

== Suppressing Guanqiu Jian and Wen Qin's rebellion ==
In 255, the Wei generals Guanqiu Jian and Wen Qin started a rebellion in Shouchun (壽春; around present-day Shou County, Anhui), the capital of Huainan Commandery (淮南郡), which was called the Chu State (楚國) at the time. Wang Ji was appointed as acting Army Supervisor (監軍), granted acting imperial authority, and put in command of the Wei forces stationed in Xuchang. Sima Shi, the Wei regent, led troops from Luoyang, the Wei imperial capital, to suppress the rebellion and met Wang Ji at Xuchang.

When Sima Shi asked him what he thought of Guanqiu Jian and Wen Qin's actions, Wang Ji replied: "The local officials in Huainan aren't responsible for starting the rebellion. Guanqiu Jian and Wen Qin forced them to rebel by threatening to kill them if they didn't. They will collapse when imperial forces show up. It won't be long before we see Guanqiu Jian and Wen Qin's dead bodies being hung at the gates." Sima Shi agreed.

Sima Shi put Wang Ji in command of the vanguard force. At the time, many Wei officials believed that Guanqiu Jian and Wen Qin were powerful and difficult to defeat, so the Wei imperial court ordered Wang Ji to hold his position and refrain from engaging the rebels in battle. Wang Ji disagreed:

"Guanqiu Jian and Wen Qin have the chance to launch an attack on us, yet they are not doing so. This means that they are not as united as they seem, and they are trying not to reveal this weakness of theirs. We should use this opportunity to show off our might and show the people we can defeat the rebels. If we do not advance and instead focus on building fortifications, the people will think that we are afraid of the rebels. This is not in line with military doctrine. If the rebels hold the local officials' families hostage to force them to rebel, we will end up losing popular support. Those who are being threatened by Guanqiu Jian and Wen Qin know that they are in the wrong, but they do not dare to escape because their families' lives are at stake. This is a place where a motley crowd gathers and where the rebel forces lack combat prowess. However, it is also an opportunity for our enemies to exploit. If Eastern Wu uses this opportunity to attack us, they can conquer many territories in Huainan. If that happens, the lands of Qiao, Pei, Ru and Yu will be in peril. That would be a big mistake. We should quickly occupy Nandun, which has a granary filled with food supplies capable of feeding our troops up to 40 days. By taking Nandun and securing a vital position, we can then show off our might to the rebels. This is an important step towards suppressing the rebellion."

Wang Ji then repeatedly sought permission to attack the rebels. When approval was finally granted, Wang Ji led his troops towards the Yin River (濦水), where he sought permission to attack the rebels:

"An army that moves fast is a powerful one. We should not waste time. Now, we are in a situation where internally we have a rebellion to put down and externally we have powerful enemies to deal with. If we are not decisive now, I cannot imagine what will happen later. Many people have said that I ought to be careful when I am leading an army into battle. Although they are right that I should be careful, I think they are wrong to ask me to refrain from advancing further. Being careful does not mean holding my position and doing nothing. If we attack now, we can win. Now that we have occupied strategic positions and set up strong defences, we should no longer be transporting food supplies to the frontline over long distances while allowing the rebels to continue to have access to food supplies in the area. That would be a big mistake."

Sima Shi wanted to wait until all the mobilised Wei forces had arrived before launching an attack on Shouchun, so he denied Wang Ji permission to attack first. Wang Ji then said: "When a general is out in the field, he doesn't always have to follow his lord's orders. If the rebels occupy territory, they make a gain. If we occupy territory, we make a gain. This is what it means to seize territory. I am referring to Nandun." Sima Shi approved and sent Wang Ji to occupy Nandun (南頓; west of present-day Xiangcheng, Henan). When Guanqiu Jian heard about it, he also led his forces towards Nandun. After travelling about 10 li, he heard that Wang Ji had already beat him to it and occupied Nandun, so he retreated back to Xiang County (項縣; present-day Shenqiu County, Henan).

Around the time, Deng Ai, the Inspector of Yan Province, was stationed with his troops at Yuejia (樂嘉; present-day Xiangcheng, Henan). When Wang Ji learnt that Guanqiu Jian had sent Wen Qin to lead a force to attack Deng Ai at Yuejia, he took advantage of the situation to attack and seize Xiang County from the rebels. After the rebellion was suppressed, Wang Ji was promoted to General Who Guards the South (鎮南將軍) and put in charge of supervising military operations in Yu Province. He was also appointed as acting Inspector of Yu Province and promoted from a village marquis to a district marquis under the title "Marquis of Anle District" (安樂鄉侯). He wrote a memorial to the Wei imperial court, requesting to give away 200 taxable households from his marquisate to his cousin, Wang Qiao (王喬), as an expression of gratitude to his late uncle Wang Weng (王翁; Wang Qiao's father) for raising him when he was young. The imperial court approved his special request and enfeoffed Wang Qiao as a Secondary Marquis (關內侯).

== Suppressing Zhuge Dan's rebellion ==
When the Wei general Zhuge Dan started a rebellion in Shouchun (壽春; around present-day Shou County, Anhui) in 257, Wang Ji was appointed acting General Who Guards the East (鎮東將軍) in addition to his existing appointment as General Who Guards the South (鎮南將軍). He was also put in charge of military operations in Yang and Yu provinces. At the time, the Wei imperial forces stationed at Xiang County (項縣; present-day Shenqiu County, Henan) did not dare to attack the rebels because they knew the rebels were seasoned soldiers. The Wei imperial court ordered Wang Ji to supervise the construction of defences and fortifications, and ignored his requests to attack the rebels.

Wei's rival state, Eastern Wu, sent Zhu Yi to lead Wu forces to Shouchun to support Zhuge Dan. The Wu forces made camp at Ancheng County (安城縣; southwest of present-day Pingyu County, Henan).

Wang Ji followed orders and led his troops to occupy the hills in the north. He told his officers: "The fortifications are already very solid and the troops have assembled here. We only need to maintain our defences and wait for the enemy to show up. If we continue to deploy our troops to guard strategic locations, we will only become even more scattered. When that happens, even the most intelligent people can't think of any solution to the problem." He then wrote a report to the Wei imperial court:

"Given our current situation in a standoff with the enemy, we should hold our position and make no move. If we deploy and spread out our troops to guard strategic locations, we will cause much uncertainty among our troops and destabilise the current situation. All the troops have taken up their positions in their fortresses and forts. Maintaining stability is key to a military commander's ability to lead troops into battle."

The imperial court approved.

Sima Zhao, the General-in-Chief (大將軍) of Wei, led imperial forces to Qiutou (丘頭; southeast of present-day Shenqiu County, Henan) and deployed them around the city to form a defence perimeter. At the time, Wang Ji commanded the 26 units stationed at the southeast of the city. Sima Zhao sent a messenger to meet Wang Ji and order him to hold his position and refrain from engaging the rebels in battle. Before long, the city ran out of supplies while the rebels increased the intensity of their attacks. Wang Ji continued to put up a firm defence and hold his ground. When the opportunity came, he launched a counterattack and defeated the rebels.

After suppressing Zhuge Dan's rebellion, Wang Ji wrote a letter to Sima Zhao:

"Initially, after much discussion, there were many officers who wanted to redeploy the troops. At the time, I was not at the frontline, so I took their word for it. General, you thought through everything carefully, maintained your composure and remained firm, and resisted pressures from the officers to the point where you disobeyed imperial orders. However, in the end, you still succeeded in defeating the rebels. Never before has anything like this happened in history."

Sima Zhao wanted to ask Tang Zi and the Wu defectors to serve as guides in leading Wei forces deep into Wu territory to launch an attack. However, Wang Ji advised him against it:

"A few years ago, Zhuge Ke wanted to capitalise on the momentum of the Wu victory at Dongguan, so he mobilised troops from Jiangdong and led them to attack Xincheng. However, he not only failed to conquer Xincheng, but also suffered heavy losses. Jiang Wei also wanted to capitalise on the momentum of the Shu victory at the Tao River, so he led his troops deep into our territory to attack us. In the end, his supply lines became overly stretched and he suffered a major defeat at Shanggui. Every time after an army scores a victory, there is a tendency for them to underestimate their enemy; when they underestimate the enemy, there is a tendency towards carelessness. Now that the Eastern Wu forces had been recently defeated and that they face internal threats as well, they are more likely to step up their defences and be on guard. Besides, after years of war, the soldiers are getting tired and want to go home. As of now, we have already received the surrender of thousands of rebel soldiers and executed the traitorous Zhuge Dan. Since the battles at the end of the Han dynasty, there has never been one like this where the winning side secures such a complete victory. When Emperor Wu defeated Yuan Shao at the Battle of Guandu, he did not pursue the enemy because he felt that he had already gained much from his victory and that pushing further would only backfire."

Sima Zhao thus called off the attack on Wu.

After pacifying the Huainan region, Wang Ji was reassigned from his position as General Who Guards the South (鎮南將軍) to General Who Attacks the East (征東將軍), and put in charge of military affairs in Yang Province. He was also elevated from the status of a district marquis to a county marquis under the title "Marquis of Dongwu" (東武侯). He wrote a memorial to the imperial court to decline the promotion, and gave the credit for suppressing the rebellion to all his subordinates. Seven chief clerks and army majors under him were thus awarded marquis titles.

When Wang Ji's mother died in 258, the Wei imperial court issued an edict ordering news of her death to be kept secret. The remains of Wang Ji's father, Wang Bao (王豹), were excavated and transferred to Luoyang for reburial together with Wang Ji's mother. The imperial court also posthumously appointed Wang Bao as the Administrator of Beihai Commandery.

== As General Who Attacks the South ==
In 259, Wang Ji was reassigned from his position as General Who Attacks the East (征東將軍) to General Who Attacks the South (征南將軍), and put in charge of supervising military operations in Jing Province. In the following year, the Wei government added 1,000 taxable households to his marquisate, bringing the total number up to 5,700. Two of Wang Ji's sons were enfeoffed as a village marquis and a secondary marquis respectively.

Sometime between 17 April and 16 May 261, (Note: Sima Biao's Zhanlüe recorded that this took place in the 3rd month of the 2nd year of the Jingyuan era (260–265) of Cao Huan's reign. This month corresponds to 17 April to 16 May 261 in the Gregorian calendar.) Hu Lie (胡烈), the Administrator of Xiangyang, reported that the Eastern Wu military officers Deng You (鄧由) and Li Guang (李光) were planning to lead 18 units to defect to Wei, and had already sent their subordinates Zhang Wu (張吳) and Deng Sheng (鄧生) across the border. Upon receiving the news, Sima Zhao and the Wei imperial court ordered Wang Ji to mobilise the military units in all of Jing Province's commanderies, including Xiangyang, in preparation for a large-scale invasion of Eastern Wu with the aid of the defectors.

When Wang Ji heard about it, he suspected that Deng You and Li Guang were pretending to defect to Wei, so he wrote an urgent report to the central government: "We should check and confirm first. We should not rush into mobilising troops and sending them deep into enemy territory." He then wrote a follow-up report:

"[...] Since the Jiaping era, we have experienced a number of rebellions and internal conflicts. The most important thing we should do now is to ensure the long-term stability of our state and bring peace to the people. We should not be too eager to attack our rivals and pursue external gains. We might just end up gaining very little and suffering heavy casualties and losses."

Sima Zhao also found Deng You and Li Guang suspicious after receiving Wang Ji's two reports within such a short span of time. He immediately ordered the mobilised troops to stop at their current positions and await further orders. Wang Ji wrote again to Sima Zhao:

"In the past, the founding emperor of the Han dynasty wanted to heed Li Sheng's suggestion and recreate the six warring states. He only stopped when Zhang Liang cautioned him. I may not be as wise and intelligent as the Marquis of Liu, (Note: The Marquis of Liu (留侯) was the peerage held by Zhang Liang.) but I fear that the Administrator of Xiangyang is on his way to making the same mistake as (Li) Yiji."

Sima Zhao immediately put the troops on high alert. He then wrote a letter to Wang Ji: "Many of those who work with me are simply sycophants hoping to gain my favour through flattery. Only a few dare to speak up and be candid towards me. You are known for your loyalty and love. You have often given me good advice. I shall heed your advice again." As Wang Ji suspected, Deng You and Li Guang were indeed pretending to defect to Wei as they did not show up as promised.

== Death ==
Wang Ji died on 9 June 261 at the age of 72 (by East Asian age reckoning). The Wei government posthumously appointed him as Minister of Works (司空) and awarded him the posthumous title "Marquis Jing" (景侯) along with the peerage "Marquis of Dongwu" (東武侯), which he declined in 258.

Fragments of Wang Ji's tombstone were discovered in Luoyang during the Qianlong era (1735–1795) of the Qing dynasty. The inscriptions are recorded in volume 56 of the Quan Sanguo Wen (全三國文) compiled by Yan Kejun (嚴可均) in the 19th century.

== Family ==
Wang Ji's son, Wang Hui (王徽), inherited his father's peerage and became the next Marquis of Dongwu (東武侯), but died early. Sometime between 264 and 265, just before the Western Jin replaced the Cao Wei state, the Cao Wei regime established a five-rank nobility system and made Wang Yi (王廙), a grandson of Wang Ji, the new Marquis of Dongwu. A new marquisate was created using the excess households from the Dongwu marquisate, and awarded to one of Wang Yi's sons under the title of a secondary marquis.

Wang Ji had a daughter, Wang Can (王粲), whose courtesy name was Nüyi (女儀). She married Sima Rong (司馬肜; son of Sima Yi) in 264, became his princess consort in 266 when he was enfeoffed as the Prince of Liang (梁王) by the Jin dynasty, and died in 284. A tombstone was erected for her in 288 near Suiyang County (睢陽縣; present-day Suiyang District, Shangqiu, Henan).

In 266, after the Jin dynasty replaced the Cao Wei state, the Jin imperial court issued an edict as follows:

"The late Minister of Works Wang Ji displayed virtuous conduct and rendered meritorious service, but he led a humble and frugal life, and did not own any private enterprises. Although he held important appointments for long periods of time, he had no excess wealth at home. His conduct and virtues make him an excellent role model for the masses. His family is hereby awarded two servants."

== See also ==
- Lists of people of the Three Kingdoms
