= Cao Lin =

Cao Lin may refer to:

- Cao Lin (Prince of Pei) (曹林; died 256), a son of the Han dynasty warlord Cao Cao, later a prince of the Cao Wei state in the Three Kingdoms period
- Cao Lin (Prince of Donghai) (曹霖; died 251), a son of Cao Pi, father of Cao Mao, and a prince of the Cao Wei state in the Three Kingdoms period
