= Wen Yang (Three Kingdoms) =

Jin Dynasty general (238–291)

- 文鴦

Colonel of the Dongyi (東夷校尉)
- In office c. 280s – 291
- Monarchs: Emperor Wu of Jin; Emperor Hui of Jin

Protector of the Army Who Pacifies the Barbarians (平虜護軍)
- In office ? – c. 280s
- Monarch: Emperor Wu of Jin

Personal details
- Born: Wen Chu (文俶); 238 (Note: The Zizhi Tongjian recorded that Wen Yang was 18 years old (by East Asian age reckoning) in 255 (2nd year of the Zheng'yuan era of Cao Mao's reign). By calculation, Wen Yang's birth year should be around 238.)
- Died: 23 April 291 (aged 53)
- Parent: Wen Qin (father)
- Relatives: Wen Hu (brother)
- Occupation: Military officer
- Courtesy name: Ciqian (次騫)
- Peerage: Secondary Marquis (關內侯)

Wen Chu (238 – 23 April 291), courtesy name Ciqian, better known as Wen Yang, (Note: Yang (鴦) was Wen Yang's infant or childhood given name (although the Zizhi Tongjian uses this name to refer to him). His formal or adult given name was Chu (俶). The Book of Jin records his name as "Shu" (淑), but due to the similarity between the two characters, this is likely to be an error.) was a military officer of the Jin dynasty of China. He previously served in the state of Cao Wei during the Three Kingdoms period. In 255, he participated in a rebellion in Shouchun started by his father, Wen Qin, and another Wei general, Guanqiu Jian. However, the rebellion was suppressed and Wen Qin and his family were forced to defect to Eastern Wu, Wei's rival state. In 257, when another rebellion broke out in Shouchun, Wen Qin and his sons led troops from Wu to support the rebel leader, Zhuge Dan. However, by 258, when the odds were against him, Zhuge Dan became increasingly suspicious of Wen Qin and eventually executed him. Wen Yang and his younger brother, Wen Hu (文虎), escaped from Shouchun and surrendered to the Wei regent, Sima Zhao, and assisted him in suppressing the revolt. Wen Yang continued serving under the Jin dynasty, which replaced the Wei regime in February 266, and achieved fame for leading successful military campaigns against tribal rebels led by Tufa Shujineng in northwestern China. In April 291, he was falsely accused of plotting a rebellion with Yang Jun, an ousted regent, and was arrested and executed along with his family.

== Life ==
Wen Yang was the second son of Wen Qin, a general of the state of Cao Wei. His ancestral home was in Qiao Commandery (譙郡), which is in present-day Bozhou, Anhui. He was already known for his great physical strength since he was young.

=== Second Rebellion in Shouchun ===
In 254, the Wei regent Sima Shi, who effectively monopolised state power in Wei, deposed the emperor Cao Fang and replaced him with Cao Mao. Wen Qin, who was serving as the Inspector (刺史) of Yang Province at the time, felt angered by Sima Shi's actions and wanted to rebel against Sima Shi. Another Wei general, Guanqiu Jian, supported Wen Qin. In the spring of 255, Guanqiu Jian, Wen Qin and others sent out a fake imperial decree in the name of Empress Dowager Guo, listing out 11 crimes allegedly committed by Sima Shi, and started a rebellion in Shouchun (壽春; present-day Shou County, Anhui) to remove Sima Shi and his clan and supporters from power. After receiving news from Deng Ai about the rebellion, Sima Shi secretly mobilised imperial troops and personally led them to suppress the rebellion and reached Yuejia (樂嘉; present-day Xiangcheng, Henan). Wen Qin was surprised when he heard that Sima Shi had shown up so quickly.

Wen Yang told his father, "The enemy has yet to establish a foothold. We can defeat them if we attack them now." Wen Qin heeded his son's advice and sent two separate forces to attack Sima Shi at night. That night, Wen Yang led his men to raid the Wei camp and shouted out Sima Shi's name during the attack. The Wei soldiers were shocked. Sima Shi, in his anxiety, aggravated the condition of his eye, which had recently been operated on, and caused his eye to pop out. However, he did not want his troops to find out about his condition and become even more panicky, so he bore the pain and bit his pillow and blanket to relieve the pain until they were torn to shreds. Wen Yang saw that the enemy was still superior in numbers and that his reinforcements did not show up, so he retreated before dawn.

After Wen Yang retreated, Sima Shi ordered his officers to pursue the enemy, but they said, "Wen Qin and his son are war veterans. They didn't suffer any losses, so why would they retreat and give up?" Sima Shi replied, "Strike the iron when it is hot or we'll lose momentum. (Wen) Yang is impatient and didn't receive support in time. They have lost momentum and have no choice but to retreat!" In the meantime, Wen Qin had retreated back to Shouchun, but Wen Yang told him, "We shouldn't retreat until we have inflicted significant damage on the enemy." He then led about 10 riders with him to attack the Wei forces like an unstoppable force before withdrawing. Sima Ban (司馬班), an officer under Sima Shi, led about 8,000 horsemen to pursue Wen Yang and his men. Wen Yang turned back to attack them and killed about 100 enemy soldiers while charging in and out of the enemy formation a total of six to seven times. The enemy did not dare to approach him.

The rebellion was eventually suppressed in 255 by Wei forces and Guanqiu Jian was killed. Wen Qin and his family defected to Eastern Wu, Wei's rival state. Sima Shi died of illness in Xuchang (許昌; present-day Xuchang, Henan) within the same year after the revolt was crushed.

=== Third Rebellion in Shouchun ===
In 257, the Wei general Zhuge Dan started another rebellion in Shouchun (壽春; present-day Shou County, Anhui) against the regent Sima Zhao, who had taken over the reins of power from his elder brother, Sima Shi. The Wu regent Sun Chen ordered Wen Qin and his sons, along with other Wu officers, to lead troops to Shouchun to help Zhuge Dan. Sima Zhao personally led the Wei forces to Shouchun to suppress the rebellion. By 258, when the odds turned against Zhuge Dan, he became more suspicious of Wen Qin, whom he was already highly distrustful of. Zhuge Dan eventually had Wen Qin executed.

When Wen Yang and his younger brother, Wen Hu (文虎), received news of their father's death, they led their men to confront Zhuge Dan and avenge their father, but their men refused to obey their orders. In desperation, Wen Yang and Wen Hu climbed over the city walls, escaped from Shouchun, and defected to Sima Zhao's side. Sima Zhao said, "Wen Qin committed an unpardonable crime (treason). His sons should be executed. However, since (Wen) Yang and (Wen) Hu have decided to surrender under desperate circumstances, and since the city (Shouchun) is yet to be captured, killing them will only harden the enemy's decision to continue resisting." He pardoned Wen Yang and Wen Hu, appointed them as military officers, awarded each of them the title of a Secondary Marquis (關內侯), and ordered them to lead 100 horsemen to travel around Shouchun's perimeter and call out to the rebels, "See, Wen Qin's sons are spared after they surrendered. What's there to be afraid of?" The rebels, who already ran out of supplies and were trapped inside the city, lost their fighting spirit. In the following month, Sima Zhao's forces succeeded in breaking through and captured Shouchun. Zhuge Dan was killed while trying to escape. The rebellion was effectively suppressed. Sima Zhao allowed Wen Yang and Wen Hu to recover their father's body and hold a proper funeral, and gave them carriages and oxen.

=== Service under the Jin dynasty ===
Wen Yang continued serving under the Jin dynasty, which, in February 266, replaced the state of Cao Wei after Sima Zhao's son, Sima Yan, forced the last Wei emperor Cao Huan to abdicate the throne in his favour. In 275, Wen Yang, who held the position of Protector of the Army Who Pacifies the Barbarians (平虜護軍), led Jin forces from Yong and Liang provinces to attack tribal rebels led by the Xianbei, Tufa Shujineng. His forces intimidated the rebels, which prompted Shujineng and some 200,000 tribespeople to submit back to Jin. When Shujineng rebelled again in 277, Wen Yang inflicted him an early defeat. Due to his role in pacifying the rebellion, he became famous for his military exploits and martial prowess.

=== Death ===
During the Taikang era (280–289), Wen Yang was appointed Colonel of the Dongyi (東夷校尉). He visited Emperor Wu (Sima Yan) at his imperial court to bid the emperor farewell before leaving to assume office. However, Emperor Wu did not like Wen Yang after meeting him and found an excuse to remove him from his appointment. In April 291, during the reign of Emperor Hui, after the regent Yang Jun was ousted from power, Zhuge Dan's maternal grandson and son of Sima Zhou, Sima Yao (司馬繇), the Duke of Dong'an (東安公), bore a grudge against Wen Yang for the downfall of his maternal grandfather so he falsely accused Wen Yang of plotting a rebellion with Yang Jun. Wen Yang was arrested and executed along with his family.

== In Romance of the Three Kingdoms ==
Wen Yang appears in the historical novel Romance of the Three Kingdoms, which romanticises the historical events before and during the Three Kingdoms period. He is described as follows:

"... Wen Yang was 18 years old, eight chi tall, [he was] dressed in full armour, with an iron club attached to his belt, [he] grabbed his spear swiftly and mounted his horse, observed the Wei camp in the far distance and advanced forward."

A verse in the novel compared his courageous actions during the raid on Sima Shi's camp at Yuejia to Zhao Yun's heroics at the Battle of Changban.

== In popular culture ==
Wen Yang was first introduced as a playable character in the eighth instalment of Koei's Dynasty Warriors video game series.

== See also ==
- Lists of people of the Three Kingdoms
