= Zhuge Dan =

Cao Wei general and politician (died 258)

- 諸葛誕
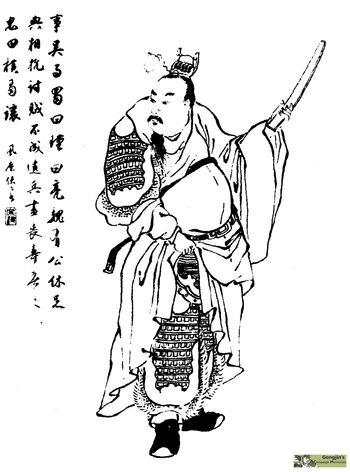

General of Agile Cavalry (驃騎將軍)
- In office 257 – 258
- Monarch: Sun Liang

Senior General Who Attacks the East (征東大將軍)
- In office August or September 255 – 257
- Monarch: Cao Mao

Senior General Who Guards the East (鎮東大將軍)
- In office February or March 255 – August or September 255
- Monarch: Cao Mao

Personal details
- Born: Unknown Yinan County, Shandong
- Died: 10 April 258 Shou County, Anhui
- Children: Zhuge Jing; Sima Zhou's wife; Wang Guang's wife
- Relatives: Zhuge Jin (cousin); Zhuge Liang (cousin); Zhuge Xuan (relative)
- Occupation: General, politician
- Courtesy name: Gongxiu (公休)
- Peerage: Marquis of Shouchun (壽春侯)

Zhuge Dan (died 10 April 258 (Note: According to Sima Zhao's biography in the Book of Jin, Zhuge Jin was killed on the yiyou day of the 2nd month of the 3rd year of the Ganlu era of Cao Mao's reign. This date corresponds to 10 April 258 in the Gregorian calendar.)), courtesy name Gongxiu, was a Chinese military general and politician of the state of Cao Wei during the Three Kingdoms period of China. When he held key military appointments throughout his middle to late career, he was involved in all of the three rebellions which broke out in Shouchun (around present-day Shou County, Anhui) between 251 and 258. During the second rebellion, he actively assisted the Wei regent Sima Shi in suppressing the revolt. After the rebellion, the Wei government put him in charge of Shouchun. As the Sima clan became more powerful and established themselves as the de facto rulers of Wei, Zhuge Dan feared that he would end up slain like Wang Ling and Guanqiu Jian – the leaders of the first two rebellions – so he started the third rebellion against Sima Zhao, who succeeded Sima Shi as regent of Wei in March 255. Although he received some support from Wei's rival state Eastern Wu, his rebellion was eventually suppressed by Wei imperial forces and he met his end at the hands of Hu Fen, a military officer under Sima Zhao.

== Early career ==
Zhuge Dan was from Yangdu County (陽都縣), Langya Commandery, which is in present-day Yinan County, Shandong. He was a descendant of Zhuge Feng (諸葛豐) and a cousin of Zhuge Jin and Zhuge Liang. He started his career as a Gentleman of Writing (尚書郎). There was once when he and Du Ji, a Supervisor (仆射), test-rode a boat in the river. The boat capsized after being hit by a wave and both men were thrown overboard. When the huben guards came to save him, Zhuge Dan told them to save Du Ji first. He lost consciousness later, drifted to the shore, and eventually recovered.

Later, Zhuge Dan became the Prefect (令) of Xingyang County (滎陽縣) and then served as a Gentleman (郎) in the Ministry of Personnel (吏部). During this time, when his colleagues recommended people to him, he would publicly reveal what they told him in private before giving jobs to the people they recommended. When he evaluated officials' performance, he would take into account what others said regardless of whether it was positive or negative. As a result, his colleagues were especially careful when they recommended people to him.

After gaining some experience in the Ministry of Personnel, Zhuge Dan was then reassigned to be a Palace Assistant Imperial Secretary and Master of Writing (御史中丞尚書). He was close friends with Xiahou Xuan and Deng Yang. They enjoyed much praise from other officials and the citizens in the imperial capital. Later, someone told the Wei emperor Cao Rui that Zhuge Dan and his friends, along with other "celebrities", (Note: These "celebrities" included the sons of famous officials, such as Liu Fang's son Liu Xi (劉熈), Sun Zi's son Sun Mi (孫密), and Wei Zhen's son Wei Lie (衞烈).) were engaging in superficial and fame-seeking behaviour. Cao Rui felt disgusted and wanted to discourage such behaviour among his subjects, so he removed Zhuge Dan from office. (Note: This incident was the "fu hua an" (浮华案); an edict was issued on 5 March 230, decreeing that officials deemed to have "mere appearances and no actual talent" were to be dismissed. Known officials affected by this decree include He Yan, Zhuge Dan, Li Sheng, Deng Yang, and Xiahou Xuan. Note that most of the officials mentioned here later died in the aftermath of the Incident at the Gaoping Tombs, Xiahou Xuan was accused of a plot against Sima Shi and executed, while Zhuge Dan died while rebelling against Sima Zhao.)

After Cao Rui's death in January 239, Cao Fang became the new Wei emperor. He restored Zhuge Dan as Palace Assistant Imperial Secretary and Master of Writing, and subsequently promoted him to Inspector (刺史) of Yang Province and General of Illustrious Martial Might (昭武將軍).

== Battle of Dongxing ==
In 251, Wei imperial forces led by the regent Sima Yi suppressed a rebellion by the Wei general Wang Ling. After that, the Wei imperial court appointed Zhuge Dan as General Who Guards the East (鎮東將軍), granted him imperial authority, put him in charge of military affairs in Yang Province, and enfeoffed him as the Marquis of Shanyang Village (山陽亭侯). After Sima Yi died later that year, his son Sima Shi succeeded him as regent and continued to control the Wei government.

Around early or mid 252, Zhuge Dan pointed out to Sima Shi that Eastern Wu forces had been making incursions on Wei territory and had constructed a large dam, complete with exterior defences, at Dongxing (東興; southeast of present-day Chaohu, Anhui). He suggested to Sima Shi to send Wang Chang and Guanqiu Jian to lead troops to attack and destroy the dam. Later that year, Sima Shi devised a strategy for launching a three-pronged attack on Eastern Wu. He sent Wang Chang to attack Nan Commandery (南郡; present-day Jingzhou, Hubei), Guanqiu Jian to attack Wuchang (武昌; present-day Ezhou, Hubei), and Hu Zun and Zhuge Dan to lead 70,000 troops to attack the Dongxing dam. In response, the Wu general Zhuge Ke led 40,000 troops to Dongxing to counter the invaders. The Battle of Dongxing concluded with a tactical victory for the Wu forces. Zhuge Dan was reassigned to the position of General Who Guards the South (鎮南將軍) after he returned from the battle.

== Guanqiu Jian and Wen Qin's Rebellion ==
In early 255, the Wei generals Guanqiu Jian and Wen Qin started a rebellion in Shouchun (壽春; present-day Shou County, Anhui) because they were unhappy with the Sima family's control over the Wei government. Both of them were close to the former Wei regent Cao Shuang and his followers, who were ousted from power in a coup in 249 by Sima Yi. Guanqiu Jian and Wen Qin sent a messenger to Zhuge Dan, urging him to rally troops in Yu Province to support them. However, Zhuge Dan executed the messenger and publicly announced that Guanqiu Jian and Wen Qin had rebelled.

Sima Shi personally led Wei imperial forces to deal with the rebels. He ordered Zhuge Dan to lead troops from Yu Province and advance to Shouchun via Anfeng Ford (安風津). After Sima Shi quelled the revolt, Zhuge Dan and his forces were the first to enter Shouchun. By then, the civilian population of Shouchun, numbering over 100,000, had fled into the countryside or escaped to Eastern Wu for fear of being killed.

The Wei imperial court appointed Zhuge Dan as Senior General Who Guards the East (鎮東大將軍), with honours equivalent to those of the Three Ducal Ministers, and ordered him to oversee military affairs in Yang Province. Earlier on, when news of Guanqiu Jian and Wen Qin's rebellion reached Eastern Wu, the Wu regent Sun Jun, along with Lü Ju, Liu Zan and others, had led Wu forces to Shouchun to support the rebels. However, by the time they showed up, Wei forces had recaptured Shouchun so the Wu forces retreated. Zhuge Dan sent his subordinate Jiang Ban (蔣班) to lead troops to attack the retreating Wu forces. Jiang Ban killed Liu Zan in the ensuing battle and obtained his official seal. For his achievements, Zhuge Dan was promoted from a village marquis to a county marquis – "Marquis of Gaoping (County)" (高平侯) – and awarded 3,500 taxable households to form his marquisate. The Wei government also changed his appointment to "Senior General Who Attacks the East" (征東大將軍).

== Zhuge Dan's Rebellion ==
=== Making preparations to rebel ===
As Zhuge Dan was close friends with Xiahou Xuan and Deng Yang (鄧颺) – both were Cao Shuang's associates – and had witnessed the downfall of Wang Ling and Guanqiu Jian, he felt very uneasy and was worried that he would become a victim of the Sima family's purges. Thus, when he was stationed in Shouchun (壽春; present-day Shou County, Anhui), he attempted to increase his popularity among the masses in the Huai River area by being very generous. He also used his personal wealth to bribe his subordinates and hire thousands of mercenaries as bodyguards. He even pardoned criminals who committed capital offences.

Around the winter of 256, Zhuge Dan found an excuse to entrench himself further in Shouchun and build up his defences. He wrote to the Wei imperial court, claiming that he heard that Eastern Wu forces were planning to attack the Huai River region. He asked for 100,000 troops and permission to build more defensive structures in the area. At the time, as Sima Shi had died in 255, his younger brother Sima Zhao had taken over the reins of power as the regent of Wei. Jia Chong suggested to Sima Zhao to keep a close watch on the generals who were guarding strategic locations throughout the Wei Empire and assess whether they were loyal to him. Sima Zhao heeded his words and sent him to Shouchun to meet Zhuge Dan. Jia Chong told Zhuge Dan, "Many wise men in Luoyang hope to see the Emperor abdicate in favour of a better ruler. You already know this. What do you think?" Zhuge Dan replied sternly, "Aren't you Inspector Jia's son? The State has treated your family generously for generations. How can you betray the State and let it fall into the hands of others? I can't stand this. If there is trouble in Luoyang, I'll die for the State." Jia Chong remained silent. After returning to Luoyang, Jia Chong told Sima Zhao, "Zhuge Dan has high prestige and popularity in Yang Province. If you summon him here and he doesn't obey, it's a small problem. But if you don't summon him, it'll become a big problem." Around the early summer of 257, Sima Zhao issued an order in the imperial court's name, ordering Zhuge Dan to return to Luoyang to serve as Minister of Works (司空) in the central government. While the order ostensibly promoted Zhuge Dan to a prestigious ministerial office (one of the Three Ducal Ministers, in fact), it was actually a move to remove him from power in Shouchun and put him under Sima Zhao's control in Luoyang.

=== Rising in revolt ===
When Zhuge Dan received the order, he knew that Sima Zhao was suspicious of him and became fearful. According to the Wei Jin Shiyu, (Note: The Shiyu cited by Pei Songzhi was the Wei Jin Shiyu.) he suspected that Yue Lin (樂綝; son of Yue Jin), the Inspector (刺史) of Yang Province, had instigated Sima Zhao to remove him from power in Shouchun and summon him to Luoyang. He then led a few hundred soldiers to Yue Lin's office to kill him. When he arrived, he saw that the gates were closed so he shouted at the guards, "Weren't you my subordinates last time?" He then forced his way in and killed Yue Lin. Another account from the Wei Mo Zhuan (魏末傳) mentioned that Zhuge Dan hosted a party after receiving the order and lied that he wanted to take a day off from work and go outside Shouchun. He brought along 700 soldiers with him. When Yue Lin heard about it, he ordered the city gates to be shut. Zhuge Dan then ordered his men to force the gates open, set fire to the Inspector's office, and killed Yue Lin. He then wrote a memorial to the imperial court, accusing Yue Lin of secretly collaborating with Eastern Wu and claiming that he executed Yue Lin after discovering his treachery. The historian Pei Songzhi believed the Wei Mo Zhuan account to be untrue, given how it described Zhuge Dan's behaviour. In any case, Zhuge Dan killed Yue Lin and started a rebellion in Shouchun against the Wei government.

When Zhuge Dan rose in revolt, he had about 100,000 troops under his command in the Huai River region. Most of these troops were stationed as part of the Wei government's tuntian policy. He also managed to recruit another 40,000 to 50,000 troops in Yang Province. He had stockpiled a year's worth of supplies and was completely capable of being self-sufficient in that region. He then sent Wu Gang (吴綱), a Chief Clerk (長史), to bring his son Zhuge Jing to seek help from Eastern Wu. In return, Zhuge Jing would remain in Wu as a hostage.

The Wu regent Sun Chen was overjoyed. He ordered Quan Yi (全懌), Quan Duan (全端), Tang Zi, Wang Zuo (王祚) and other officers to lead 30,000 Wu troops to support Zhuge Dan's rebellion. He also secretly asked Wen Qin, who had defected to Wu after Guanqiu Jian's defeat, to help Zhuge Dan. The Wu government granted Zhuge Dan imperial authority and the following appointments: Left Protector-General (左都護), Grand Minister Over the Masses (大司徒), General of Agile Cavalry (驃騎將軍), and Governor of Qing Province (青州牧). They also enfeoffed him as the Marquis of Shouchun (壽春侯).

=== Battles ===
Among the various Wei imperial forces sent to suppress Zhuge Dan's rebellion, the army led by Wang Ji arrived at Shouchun first and started to surround the city. Before the encirclement was complete, the Wu forces led by Tang Zi and Wen Qin managed to cut across mountainous terrain in the northeast of Shouchun and enter the city to meet up with Zhuge Dan.

Around July 258, Sima Zhao reached Xiang County (項縣; present-day Shenqiu County, Henan), where he took overall command of the 260,000 troops mobilised from throughout the Wei Empire to suppress the rebellion, and advanced towards Shouchun. He remained at Qiutou (丘頭), while sending Wang Ji and Chen Qian (陳鶱) to surround Shouchun and reinforce their encirclement with defensive structures such as earth walls and moats. At the same time, he also ordered Shi Bao (石苞) and Zhou Tai to lead some troops to patrol the perimeter and guard against any forces coming to help Zhuge Dan. When Wen Qin and others attempted to break out of the siege, they were driven back by the Wei forces.

The Wu general Zhu Yi led another force to Shouchun to assist Zhuge Dan. Zhou Tai attacked Zhu Yi at Lijiang (黎漿) and defeated him. The Wu regent Sun Chen was furious with Zhu Yi's failure and had him executed.

=== Defections ===
After some time, Shouchun gradually ran low on supplies and became increasingly isolated from the outside world. Two of Zhuge Dan's close aides, Jiang Ban (蔣班) and Jiao Yi (焦彝), told their general: "Zhu Yi came with a large army but failed to achieve anything. Sun Chen executed Zhu Yi and returned to Jiangdong. He is actually putting on a front when he sent troops to help us. His decision to turn back already shows that he is adopting a wait-and-see attitude. Now, since our troops are still high on morale and eager to fight, we should focus all efforts on breaking one side of the siege. Even if we cannot drive back the enemy, we can at least allow some of our forces to escape and survive."

Wen Qin disagreed and told Zhuge Dan, "Jiangdong forces are known for having scored victories; their enemies in the north can't stop them. Sir, you have led over 100,000 men to join Jiangdong. Quan Yi, myself and the others from Jiangdong are trapped here too with you. Our families are still in Jiangdong. Even if Sun Chen doesn't want to save us, do you think our Emperor and his relatives will abandon us? There were times in the past when our enemy unexpectedly suffered a plague. Now that we have been stuck here for almost a year, if we stir up any feelings of divisiveness, a mutiny might happen. We should continue to hold out and maintain our hopes that help will arrive soon."

Wen Qin became angry when Jiang Ban and Jiao Yi repeatedly urged Zhuge Dan to follow their plan. Zhuge Dan also became increasingly frustrated with Jiang Ban and Jiao Yi and wanted to execute them. The two of them feared for their lives and realised that Zhuge Dan was destined to fail, so in December 257 or January 258, they escaped from Shouchun and surrendered to Sima Zhao.

Sima Zhao later used a ploy to persuade Quan Yi (全懌) and Quan Duan (全端) to surrender. The Quans fell for the ruse and led a few thousand men with them out of Shouchun to defect to Sima Zhao's side. Their defection caused much fear and panic among Zhuge Dan's forces.

=== Attempting to break the siege ===
In February or March 258, Wen Qin told Zhuge Dan, "Jiang Ban and Jiao Yi left because we didn't follow their idea to attack the enemy. Quan Duan and Quan Yi have defected too. The enemy must have lowered their guard. Now is the time to attack them." Zhuge Dan agreed, so he, Wen Qin and Tang Zi led their troops out to attack and attempt to break out of the siege.

Their efforts proved futile because the Wei forces, due to having constructed walls and other defensive structures earlier, were in a more advantageous position over them. The Wei soldiers rained boulders and flaming arrows on Zhuge Dan's forces; thousands were wounded or killed, and the ground was soaked with blood. Unable to break the siege, Zhuge Dan and his forces retreated to Shouchun, which had run out of food supplies by then. Thousands of Zhuge Dan's men came out of the city and surrendered to Sima Zhao.

=== Downfall and death ===
Earlier on, Wen Qin wanted Zhuge Dan to reduce food rations and send all his men to break the siege, while he and the troops from Eastern Wu would remain behind to guard Shouchun. Zhuge Dan strongly disapproved and quarrelled with Wen Qin over this. Although they initially cooperated, they became more suspicious and distrustful of each other as the situation in Shouchun became more desperate. Zhuge Dan eventually had Wen Qin executed.

Upon learning of their father's death at Zhuge Dan's hands, Wen Qin's sons Wen Yang and Wen Hu (文虎) attempted to flee from Shouchun. After failing to persuade their men to join them, they escaped on their own and surrendered to Sima Zhao. When an officer advised Sima Zhao to execute them, Sima Zhao said, "Wen Qin's crimes don't warrant death. Although his sons should be executed, they have surrendered to us. Besides, as the city has yet to be recaptured, executing them will only harden the rebels' resolve." He pardoned Wen Yang and Wen Hu, and ordered a few hundred riders to escort them on a tour around Shouchun and announce to the rebels in the city: "See? Wen Qin's sons have been spared. What's there to be afraid of?" Sima Zhao later appointed Wen Yang and Wen Hu as military officers and enfeoffed them as secondary marquises.

By then, most of Zhuge Dan's men had lost their will to fight after being trapped in the city for months without food. Zhuge Dan, Tang Zi and the remaining officers in Shouchun were also at their wits' end. Sima Zhao came to Shouchun and personally directed his forces to press on the siege and call for battle. The defenders did not respond. Zhuge Dan then attempted to break out of the siege with a few of his subordinates. Hu Fen (胡奮), a military officer under Sima Zhao, led his men to attack Zhuge Dan and killed him. Zhuge Dan's severed head was put on display and his family members were executed. Zhuge Dan had recruited a few hundred mercenaries as bodyguards. After his death, they were rounded up and each was offered the chance to surrender and be spared, but none accepted and all were executed. The loyalty of these bodyguards towards Zhuge Dan was comparable to the loyalty of the 500 retainers towards Tian Heng (田橫). (Note: Tian Heng (田橫; died 202 BCE) was a ruler of the Qi state during the Chu–Han Contention (206–202 BCE), a transition period between the fall of the Qin dynasty and founding of the Han dynasty. After his defeat by Liu Bang (Emperor Gao) (the founding emperor of the Han dynasty), he committed suicide after refusing to surrender. He had about 500 retainers under him and they all followed suit.) Yu Quan (于詮), a Wu officer, said, "I have received orders from my lord to lead troops to help others. I failed in my mission and can't do anything to defeat the enemy. I won't stand for this." He then removed his body armour and charged towards the enemy and was killed. Tang Zi, Wang Zuo (王祚) and the other Wu officers surrendered to Sima Zhao. The weapons and equipment captured from the Wu forces formed huge piles like hills.

== Family ==
Zhuge Dan had at least one son and two daughters.

One of Zhuge Dan's daughters married Wang Guang (王廣), Wang Ling's son. On her wedding night, Wang Guang supposedly told her, "You resemble Gongxiu (Zhuge Dan's courtesy name) so much in your facial expressions!" She replied, "You can't be like Yanyun (Wang Ling's courtesy name), so you compare your wife to a hero!" (Note: In his annotation to the anecdote, Liang dynasty scholar Liu Jun (刘峻; courtesy name Xiaobiao (孝标)) remarked that given Wang Guang's reputation, he is unlikely to mock his father-in-law; Liu thought that the anecdote was untrue.) She was most likely executed along with the rest of the Wang family after Wang Ling's downfall.

Zhuge Dan's other daughter married Sima Zhou, Sima Yi's sixth son, who became a prince during the Jin dynasty. She was then known as "Grand Consort Zhuge" (諸葛太妃). She bore Sima Zhou four sons: Sima Jin (司馬覲), Sima Yao (司馬繇), Sima Cui (司馬漼) and Sima Dan (司馬澹). Sima Jin's son Sima Rui became the founding emperor of the Eastern Jin dynasty (317–420); through Sima Rui, Zhuge Dan is an ancestor of every emperor of the Eastern Jin.

Zhuge Dan's son, Zhuge Jing, was sent as a hostage to Eastern Wu in 257 in return for support from Wu forces for his father's rebellion. He remained in Wu and served as Minister of War (大司馬). In 280, after the Jin dynasty conquered Wu, Zhuge Jing went into hiding in the home of his sister (the one who married Sima Zhou). The Jin emperor Sima Yan (Emperor Wu) considered Zhuge Jing his relative (Note: Sima Zhou was an uncle of Emperor Wu.) and knew that Zhuge Jing was hiding in his sister's home, so he paid them a visit. When Zhuge Jing heard that the emperor had come to visit him, he hid in the latrine and refused to come out. The emperor insisted on seeing him and said, "Today, we finally meet each other again." Zhuge Jing replied tearfully, "I regret not being able to cover my body in paint and remove the skin from my face (Note: Zhuge Jing was describing his feelings of embarrassment at meeting Emperor Wu. "Cover my body in paint" alludes to the story of Yu Rang, while "remove the skin from my face" alludes to the story of Nie Zheng; both men were famous assassins in the Spring and Autumn period.) before I meet Your Majesty again!" Emperor Wu appointed him as Palace Attendant, but he refused to accept, returned to his hometown and lived the rest of his life as a commoner. Zhuge Jing had two sons: Zhuge Yi (諸葛頤) and Zhuge Hui (諸葛恢). Zhuge Yi served as Minister of Ceremonies (太常) during the Jin dynasty and was favoured by Emperor Yuan. Zhuge Hui served as Prefect of the Masters of Writing (尚書令), and had his own biography in the Book of Jin (volume 77).

== In popular culture ==
Zhuge Dan is first introduced as a playable character in the seventh installment of Koei's Dynasty Warriors video game series.

== See also ==
- Lists of people of the Three Kingdoms
