= Cao Lin (Prince of Donghai) =

Imperial prince of Cao Wei (died 251)

Cao Lin 曹霖

Prince of Donghai (東海王)
- Tenure: 232 – 5 February 251
- Successor: Cao Qi

Prince of Guantao (館陶王)
- Tenure: 225–232

Prince of Hedong (河東王)
- Tenure: 8 April 222 – 225
- Born: Unknown (Note: Although Cao Lin's age when he was enfeoffed as the Prince of Hedong was not recorded, he was likely to be a child at the time. Thus, his birth year should be in the 210s.)
- Died: 5 February 251 (Note: The Sanguozhi mentioned that Cao Lin died on the jiachen day in the 12th month of the 2nd year of the Jia'ping era in Cao Fang's reign. This date corresponds to 5 February 251 in the Gregorian calendar, according to this tool: http://sinocal.sinica.edu.tw/)
- Issue: Cao Qi; Cao Mao
Names
- Family name: Cao (曹); Given name: Lin (霖)
Posthumous name
- Prince Ding (定王)
- House: House of Cao
- Father: Cao Pi
- Mother: Lady Qiu

Cao Lin (died 5 February 251) was an imperial prince of the state of Cao Wei in the Three Kingdoms period of China. He was a son of Cao Pi, the first Wei emperor, and the biological father of Cao Mao, the fourth Wei emperor.

== Life ==
Cao Lin's father was Cao Pi, the first emperor of Wei. His mother, whose maiden family name was Qiu (仇), was a concubine of Cao Pi holding the rank of zhaoyi (昭儀; translated "Lady of Bright Deportment"). He was enfeoffed as the Prince of Hedong (河東王) on 8 April 222 during his father's reign. In 225, his title was changed to "Prince of Guantao" (館陶王).

In 227, after Cao Pi's death, Cao Lin's half-brother Cao Rui succeeded their father and became the second emperor of Wei. Cao Rui treated Cao Lin in an exceptionally generous manner in accordance with their father's final wishes. Cao Lin was known for being prone to domestic violence; he abused and killed servants and concubines alike. In 232, his title was changed again to "Prince of Donghai" (東海王). He died on 5 February 251 during the reign of Cao Fang, the third emperor of Wei. He was honoured with the posthumous title "Prince Ding" (定王).

Cao Lin had two sons: Cao Qi (曹啟) and Cao Mao (曹髦). The elder one, Cao Qi, inherited his princedom and became the next Prince of Donghai. Over the reigns of the subsequent Wei emperors, the number of taxable households in the Donghai princedom increased until it reached 6,200. Cao Lin's younger son, Cao Mao, initially held the title "Duke of Gaogui District" (高貴鄉公). In 254, following Cao Fang's death, Empress Dowager Guo selected Cao Mao to be the fourth emperor of Wei. In accordance with imperial customs, Cao Mao was adopted as a posthumous son of Cao Rui so that his succession would be considered legitimate.

== Family ==
Sons:

- Cao Qi, Prince Donghai (東海王 曹啟)
- Cao Mao, Emperor (皇帝 曹髦; 241–260)

== See also ==
- Lists of people of the Three Kingdoms
- Cao Wei family trees
