= Wen Qin =

Cao Wei state general and politician (died 258)

- 文欽

Senior General Who Guards the North (鎮北大將軍)
- In office 255 – February or March 258
- Monarch: Sun Liang

Protector-General (都護)
- In office 255 – February or March 258
- Monarch: Sun Liang

Administrator of Lujiang (廬江太守)
- In office ? – 255
- Monarch: Cao Fang /Cao Mao (Note: The Wei Shu by Wang Chen implied that Wen Qin was made Administrator of Lujiang after Cao Rui's reign.)

Inspector of Yang Province (揚州刺史)
- In office 249 or after (Note: The Wei Shu by Wang Chen recorded that Wen Qin replaced Zhuge Dan as Inspector of Yang Province, after Wen was made General of the Vanguard.) – ?
- Monarch: Cao Fang

General of the Vanguard (前將軍)
- In office February 249 or after (Note: The Wei Shu by Wang Chen recorded that Wen Qin was granted this post after Cao Shuang's execution, which was in February 249.) – ?
- Monarch: Cao Fang

Personal details
- Born: Unknown Bozhou, Anhui
- Died: February or March 258 (Note: Sun Liang's biography in the Sanguozhi recorded that Zhuge Dan executed Wen Qin in the 1st month of the 3rd year of the Taiping era of Sun Liang's reign. This month corresponds to 20 February to 21 March 258 in the Gregorian calendar.) Shou County, Anhui
- Children: Wen Hu; Wen Yang
- Parent: Wen Ji (father)
- Occupation: Military general, politician
- Courtesy name: Zhongruo (仲若)
- Peerage: Marquis of Qiao (譙侯)

Wen Qin (died February or March 258), courtesy name Zhongruo, was a Chinese military general and politician of the state of Cao Wei during the Three Kingdoms period of China.

Wen Qin was a son of Wen Ji (文稷), a general who served under Cao Cao. In September or October 219, during Wei Feng's rebellion, Wen Qin was implicated and imprisoned. Wen Qin was flogged a few hundred times and was supposed to be executed, but Cao Cao spared him on his father's account.

He served as the Inspector of Yang Province during the reign of the third Wei emperor, Cao Fang. In 254, when the Wei regent Sima Shi, who effectively controlled the Wei government, deposed Cao Fang and replaced him with Cao Mao, Wen Qin was deeply displeased because his loyalty was to the Wei emperor and not the Sima family. In the following year, he and another Wei general, Guanqiu Jian, started a rebellion in Shouchun (present-day Shou County, Anhui) against Sima Shi. However, Sima Shi managed to suppress the rebellion within months; Guanqiu Jian was killed while Wen Qin and his family escaped and defected to Wei's rival state, Eastern Wu. In 257, when another Wei general Zhuge Dan started a rebellion in Shouchun against the Wei regent Sima Zhao (Sima Shi's brother and successor), Wen Qin and some Wu forces came to Shouchun to support Zhuge Dan. Sima Zhao led Wei forces to besiege Shouchun and the siege dragged on until early 258. As the situation became more dire, relations between Wen Qin and Zhuge Dan deteriorated, especially since they did not trust each other before. Zhuge Dan eventually had Wen Qin executed. Wen Qin's sons, Wen Yang and Wen Hu, fled from Shouchun and surrendered to Sima Zhao.

== See also ==
- Lists of people of the Three Kingdoms
