= Cao Wei =

Chinese state (220–266) during the Three Kingdoms period

Wei 魏
- 220–266 AD
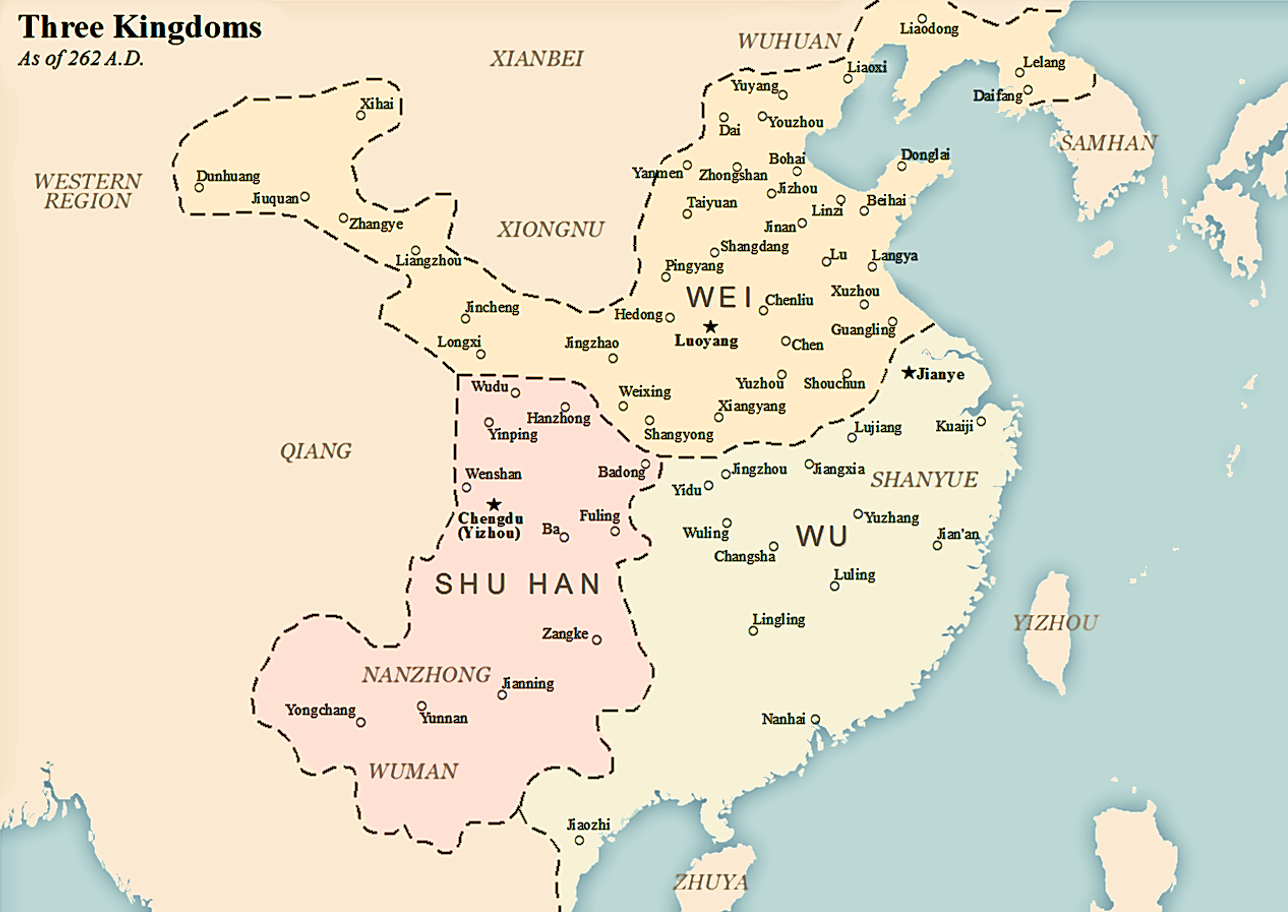
- China in 262 AD, with territories of Cao Wei in yellow
- Capital: Xuchang (220–226); Luoyang (226–266)
- Common languages: Eastern Han Chinese
- Religion: Taoism, Confucianism, Chinese folk religion
- Government: Monarchy
- Emperor
  - Dec 220 – Jun 226 AD: Cao Pi
  - Jun 226 – Jan 239 AD: Cao Rui
  - Jan 239 – Oct 254 AD: Cao Fang
  - Oct 254 – Jun 260 AD: Cao Mao
  - Jun 260 – Feb 266 AD: Cao Huan
- Historical era: Three Kingdoms
  - Abdication of Emperor Xian of Han: 11 December 220 AD
  - Eastern Wu declaring independence from Wei: 222
  - Conquest of Shu by Wei: 263
  - Abdication of Cao Huan: 4 February 266 AD

Population
  - 260: 4,432,881 (disputed) (Note: This figure, based on numbers given in the Records of the Three Kingdoms, has been called into question since the census system is claimed to have been flawed. The actual population is likely to be far greater. Tanner (2009) estimates the population of Wei to be over two-thirds of the Han population.)
- Currency: Chinese coin, Chinese cash (Wu Zhu)
Preceded by	Succeeded by
Eastern Han	Jin dynasty (266–420)
- Today part of: China; North Korea

Cao Wei
- Traditional Chinese: 曹魏
- Simplified Chinese: 曹魏
- Hanyu Pinyin: Cáo Wèi
Transcriptions
Standard Mandarin
- Hanyu Pinyin: Cáo Wèi
- Bopomofo: ㄘㄠˊ ㄨㄟˋ
- Gwoyeu Romatzyh: Tsaur Wey
- Wade–Giles: Tsʻao^{2} Wei^{4}
- Tongyong Pinyin: Cáo Wèi
- Yale Romanization: Tsáu Wèi
- IPA: [tsʰǎʊ wêɪ]
Yue: Cantonese
- Yale Romanization: Chòuh Ngaih
- Jyutping: Cou4 ngai6
- IPA: [tsʰɔw˩ ŋɐj˨]
Southern Min
- Hokkien POJ: Chô Gūi
- Tâi-lô: Tsô Guī

Wei (Chinese: 魏 (Note: Pinyin: Wèi < Middle Chinese: ŋjwei^{C} < Eastern Han Chinese: *ŋui^{C}) (220–266))), also known as Cao Wei (曹魏) or Former Wei, was one of the major dynastic states in China during the Three Kingdoms period. The state was established in 220 AD by Cao Pi based upon the foundations laid by his father Cao Cao during the end of the Han dynasty. Its capital was initially located at Xuchang, and was later moved to Luoyang.

The name Wei first became associated with Cao Cao when he was named the Duke of Wei by the Eastern Han government in 213 AD, and became the name of the state when Cao Pi proclaimed himself emperor in 220 AD. Historians often add the prefix "Cao" to distinguish it from other Chinese states known as Wei. The authority of the ruling Cao family dramatically weakened following the deposition and execution of Cao Shuang, a regent for the dynasty's third emperor Cao Fang in 249 AD. Following Cao Shuang's death, another regent, Sima Yi, gradually consolidated state authority for himself and his relatives, with the last Wei emperors largely being puppets of the Sima family. In 266 AD, Sima Yi's grandson Sima Yan forced Emperor Yuan to abdicate, proclaiming himself to be emperor of the newly established Jin dynasty; he would be posthumously known as Emperor Wu (of Jin).

== History ==
=== Beginnings and founding ===
Towards the end of the Eastern Han dynasty, northern China came under the control of Cao Cao, the chancellor to the last Han ruler, Emperor Xian. In 213, Emperor Xian granted Cao Cao the title of "Duke of Wei" (魏公) and gave him ten cities as his dukedom. The area was named "Wei". At that time, the southern part of China was divided into two areas controlled by two other warlords, Liu Bei and Sun Quan. In 216, Emperor Xian promoted Cao Cao to the status of a vassal king – "King of Wei (魏王)".

Cao Cao died on 15 March 220 and his vassal king title was inherited by his son Cao Pi. Later that year, on 11 December, Cao Pi forced Emperor Xian to abdicate in his favour and took over the throne, establishing the state of Wei. However, Liu Bei immediately contested Cao Pi's claim to the Han throne and declared himself "Emperor of Han" a year later. Sun Quan was nominally a vassal king under Wei, but he declared independence in 222 and eventually proclaimed himself "Emperor of Wu" in 229.

To distinguish the state from other historical Chinese states of the same name, historians have added a relevant character to the state's original name, making the state that called itself "Wei" (魏) known as "Cao Wei" (曹魏).

=== Reigns of Cao Pi and Cao Rui ===
Cao Pi ruled for six years until his death on 29 June 226 and was succeeded by his son, Cao Rui, who ruled until his death on 22 January 239. Throughout the reigns of Cao Pi and Cao Rui, Wei had been fighting numerous wars with its two rival states – Shu and Wu.

Between 228 and 234, Zhuge Liang, the Shu chancellor and regent, led a series of five military campaigns to attack Wei's western borders (within present-day Gansu and Shaanxi), with the aim of conquering Chang'an, a strategic city which lay on the road to the Wei capital, Luoyang. The Shu invasions were repelled by the Wei armies led by the generals Cao Zhen, Sima Yi, Zhang He and others; Shu did not make any significant gains in the expeditions.

On its southern and eastern borders, Wei engaged Wu in a series of armed conflicts throughout the 220s and 230s, including the battles of Dongkou (222–223), Jiangling (223) and Shiting (228). However, most of the battles resulted in stalemate and neither side managed to significantly expand its territory.

=== Sima Yi's Liaodong Campaign ===
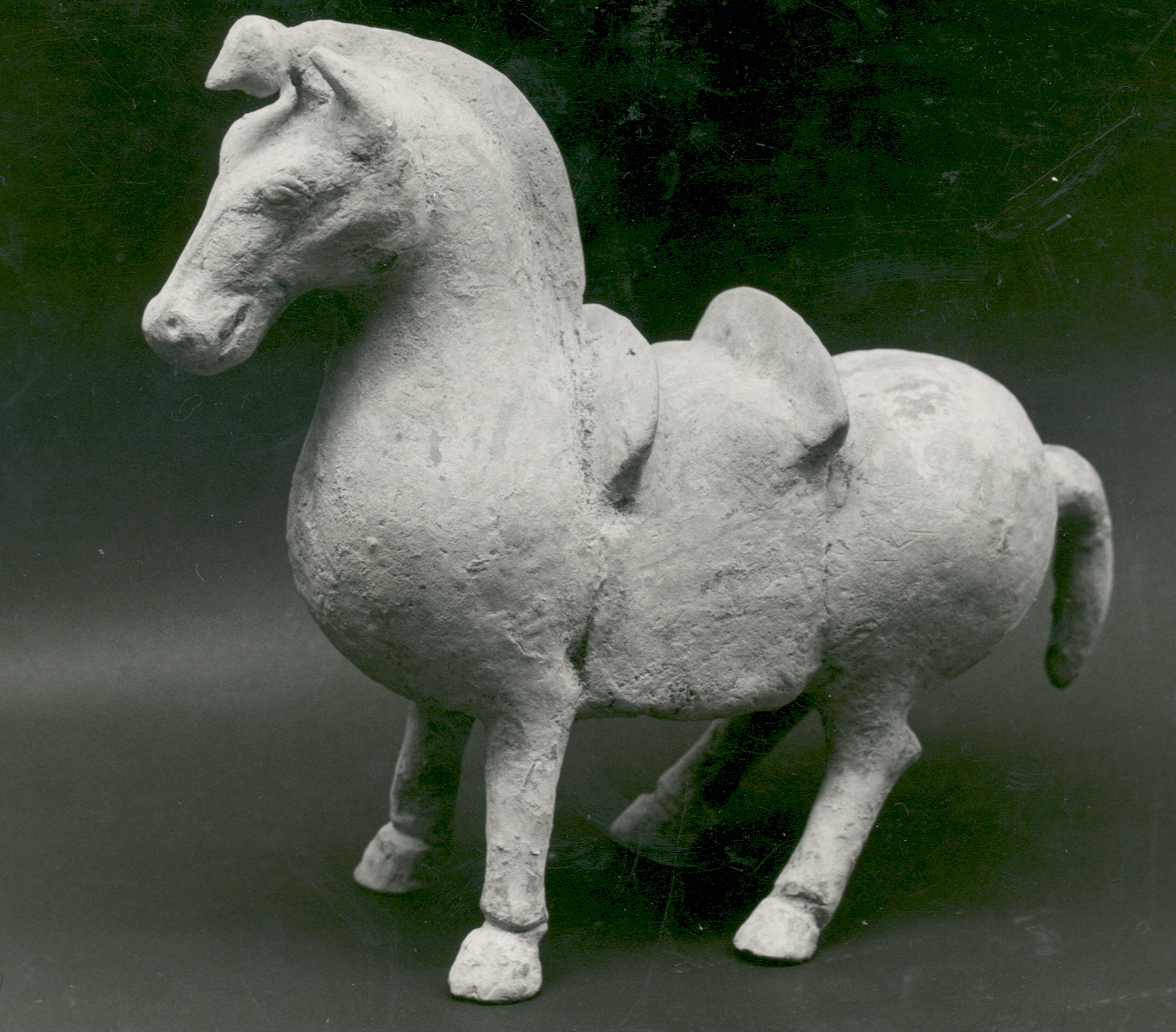
Cao Wei horse figure.

After Guanqiu Jian failed to subjugate the Gongsun clan of the Liaodong Commandery, it was Sima Yi who, in June 238, as the Grand Commandant (太尉), launched an invasion with 40,000 troops at the behest of Emperor Cao Rui against Liaodong, which at this point had been firmly rooted under Gongsun control for 4 decades. After a three-month long siege, involving some assistance from the Goguryeo Kingdom, Sima Yi managed to capture the capital city of Xiangping, resulting in the conquest of the commandery by late September of the same year.

=== Goguryeo–Wei Wars ===
Around that time, as the Korean kingdom Goguryeo consolidated its power, it proceeded to conquer the territories on the Korean peninsula which were under Chinese rule. Goguryeo initiated the Goguryeo–Wei Wars in 242, trying to cut off Chinese access to its territories in Korea by attempting to take a Chinese fort. However, Wei responded by invading and defeated Goguryeo. Hwando was destroyed in a reprisal raid by Wei forces in 244. The invasions sent its king fleeing, and broke the tributary relationships between Goguryeo and the other tribes of Korea that formed much of Goguryeo's economy. Although the king evaded capture and eventually settled in a new capital, Goguryeo was reduced to such insignificance that for half a century there was no mention of the state in Chinese historical texts.

=== Fall of Wei ===
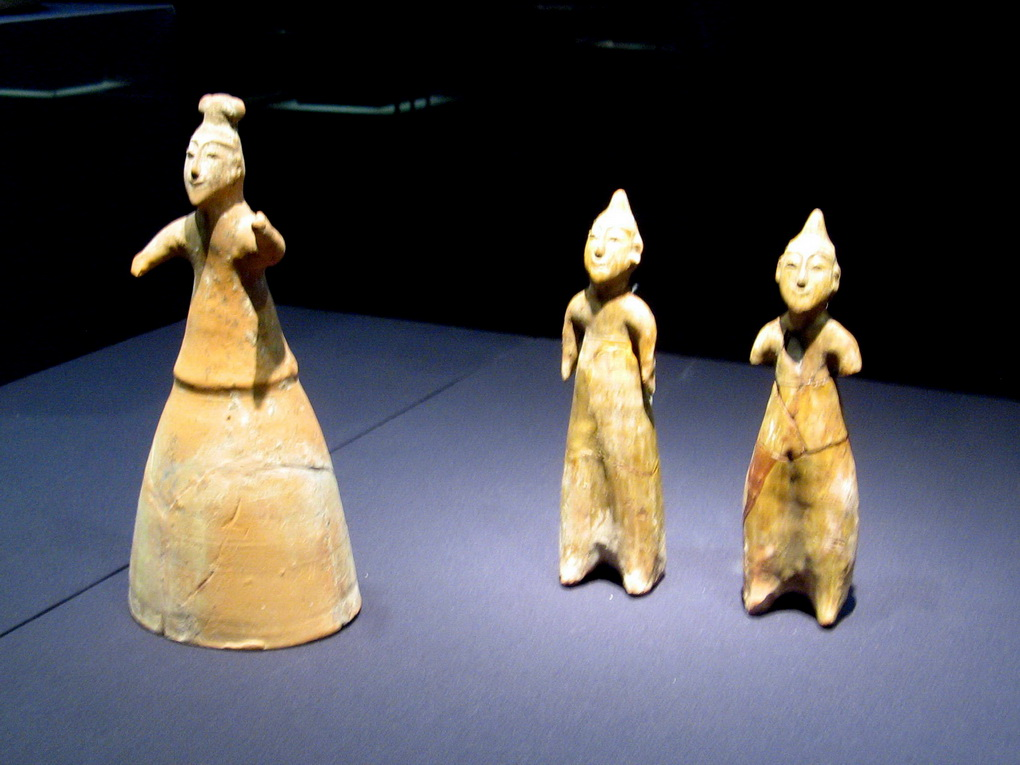
Celadon standing figures, Haidian Museum, Cao Wei Dynasty.

In 249, during the reign of Cao Rui's successor, Cao Fang, the regent Sima Yi seized state power from his co-regent, Cao Shuang, in a coup. This event marked the collapse of imperial authority in Wei, as Cao Fang's role had been reduced to that of a puppet ruler while Sima Yi wielded state power firmly in his hands. Wang Ling, a Wei general, tried to rebel against Sima Yi, but was swiftly dealt with, and took his own life. Sima Yi died on 7 September 251, passing on his authority to his eldest son, Sima Shi, who continued ruling as regent.

Sima Shi deposed Cao Fang in 254, on grounds of planning to stage a rebellion, and replaced him with Cao Mao. In response, Guanqiu Jian and Wen Qin staged a rebellion, but were crushed by Sima Shi in an event that nevertheless took a heavy toll on Sima Shi's health, having undergone eye surgery prior to the insurrection, causing him to die on 23 March 255, but not before handing his power and regency over to his younger brother, Sima Zhao.

In 258, Sima Zhao quelled Zhuge Dan's rebellion, marking an end to what are known as the Three Rebellions in Shouchun. In 260, Cao Mao attempted to seize back state power from Sima Zhao in a coup, but was killed by Cheng Ji, a military officer who was serving under Jia Chong, a subordinate to the Simas. After Cao Mao's death, Cao Huan was enthroned as the fifth ruler of Wei. However, Cao Huan was also a mere figurehead under Sima Zhao's control, much like his predecessor. In 263, Wei armies led by Zhong Hui and Deng Ai conquered Shu. Afterwards, Zhong Hui and former Shu general Jiang Wei grouped and plotted together in order to oust Sima Zhao from power, however, various Wei officials turned against them when it was found out that Jiang Wei had urged Zhong Hui to get rid of these officials before the planned coup. Sima Zhao himself received and finally accepted the nine bestowals and the title Duke of Jin in 263, and was further bestowed with the title King of Jin by Cao Huan in 264, but he died on 6 September 265, leaving the final step of usurpation up to his eldest son, Sima Yan.

On 4 February 266, Sima Zhao's son, Sima Yan, forced Cao Huan to abdicate in his favor, replacing Wei with the Jin dynasty on 8 February 266. (Note: On the bingyin (丙寅) day of the 12th month of the 1st year of the Taishi era, Sima Yan became emperor and adopted "Taishi" (泰始) as the era name of his reign. This date corresponds to 8 February 266 in the Gregorian calendar.) Cao Huan himself was spared, though, and continued to live until 302, before dying.

== Government ==
The system of government in Wei inherited many aspects from that of the Eastern Han dynasty. During his reign, Cao Pi established two separate government bodies – the Central Inspectorate (中書監) and the Imperial Secretariat plenipotentiary (行尚書臺) – to reduce the authority of the Imperial Secretariat (尚書臺) and consolidate the power of the central government.

During this time, the minister Chen Qun developed the nine-rank system for civil service nomination, which was adopted by later dynasties until it was superseded by the imperial examination system in the Sui dynasty.

Cao Pi felt that the Han dynasty collapsed because the Governors (州牧) of the various provinces wielded too much power and fell outside the control of the central government. He reduced the role of a Governor to that of an Inspector (刺史), and permitted the Inspectors to administer only civil affairs in their respective provinces, while military affairs were handled by military personnel based in regional offices or in the capital.

Cao Wei society was feudalized and vassalized. When China was divided in the Period of Disunion, south and north were economically and socially dominated by an aristocratic hereditary class enshrined in law, who were exempt from conscript labor, special kinds of taxes, had legal immunities and other privileges. This situation was created by Cao Wei with rigid social stratification backed by law between shu (庶) (commoner) households and shi (士) (noble) households in the Nine ranks system which was created by Cao Wei and enabled hereditary officeholding by the aristocratic magnate families. Magnates took in farming families and war refugees into their fortress villages as ke (客) (private clients) and as buqu (military retainers) who made up their private militias. These magnates were rich landowners and local warlords and their economic and social power only grew at this time. The military retainers stayed on as private agricultural laborers bonded to the magnate families even after war ended. They did not contribute any labor service or taxes to the central government while their magnate lord received 50% or more of their grain harvest. They effectively were bondservants to their lords.

== Culture ==
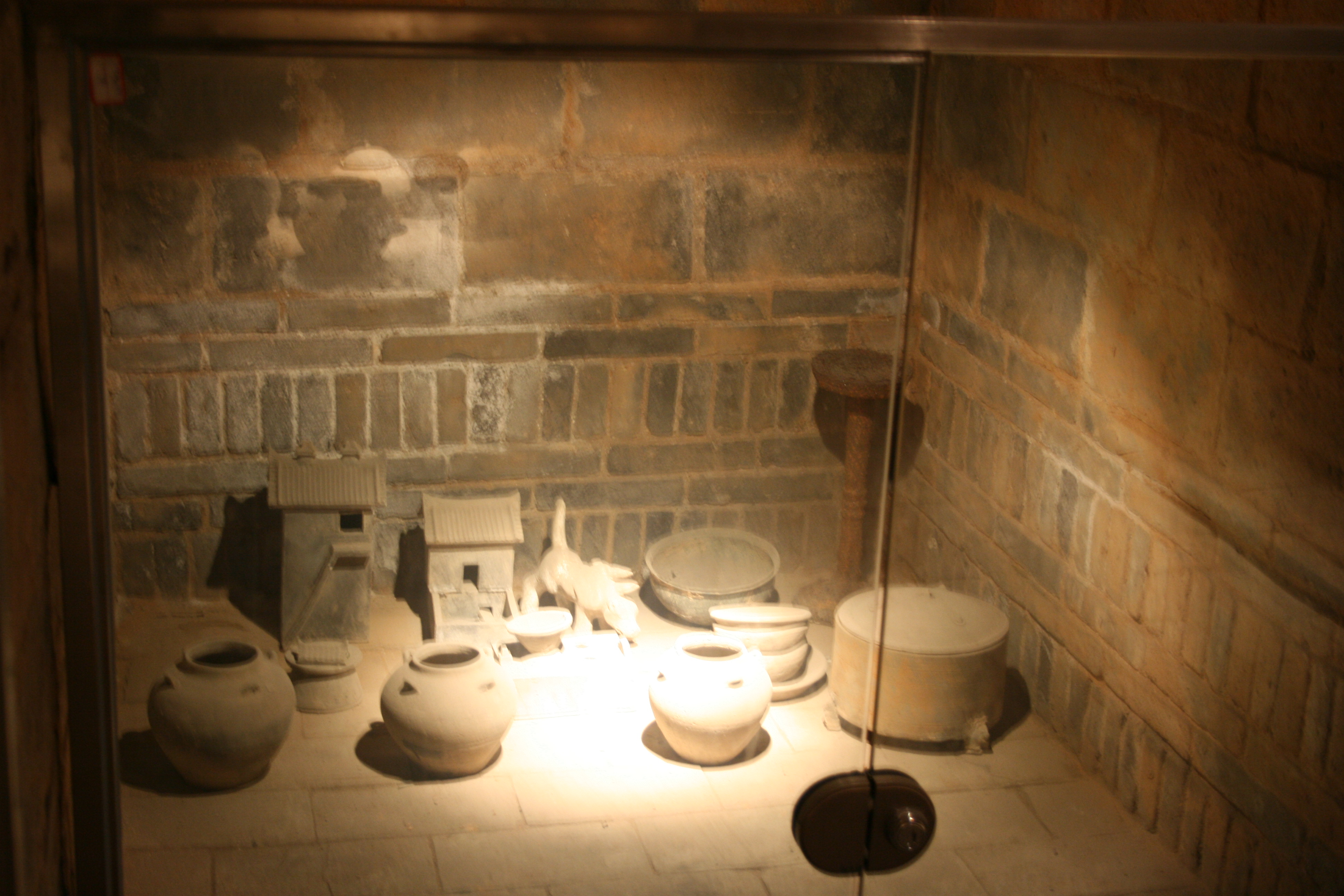
A Cao Wei tomb, 247 CE

The kaishu style of Chinese calligraphy was developed at some time between the late Eastern Han dynasty and the Cao Wei dynasty, as well as the Jian'an poetry style. The first known master of the former was Zhong Yao, an official of Wei, of the latter; Cao Cao's son, Cao Zhi.

Since the beginning of the Cao Wei dynasty, finding their roots in Cao Cao's administrative influences, intellectual constraints were relaxed, leading to the formation of new groups of intellectuals, such as the Seven Sages of the Bamboo Grove. These intellectual freedoms were overturned by the time of the Jin dynasty (it was Sima Yi himself who associated with the orthodox Confucianists, who despised these new intellectual groups, and therefore were more willing to offer their support to the Sima clan).

== Ruling class ==
According to the Book of Wei by Wang Chen, the Cao family descended from the Yellow Emperor through his grandson Zhuanxu. They were of the same lineage as Emperor Shun. Another account says that the Cao family descended from Emperor Shun. This account was attacked by Jiang Ji, who claimed that those with the family name "Tian" descended from Shun, but not those surnamed "Cao". He also claimed that "Gui" (媯) was Emperor Shun's family name.

== List of territories ==
Province	Commanderies and Kingdoms/Principalities
You	Fanyang (范陽), Dai (代), Yuyang (漁陽), Youbeiping (右北平), Liaoxi (遼西), Lelang (樂浪), Shanggu (上谷), Yan (principality) (燕國), Changli (昌黎), Xuantu (玄菟), Liaodong (遼東), Daifang (帶方)
Ji	Wei (魏), Yangping (陽平), Guangping (廣平), Qinghe (清河), Julu (鉅鹿), Zhao (principality) (趙國), Changshan (常山), Anping (安平), Pingyuan (平原), Leling (principality) (樂陵), Hejian (河間), Bohai (渤海), Zhongshan (principality) (中山國)
Qing	Chengyang (城陽), Donglai (東萊), Beihai (principality) (北海國), Qi (principality) (齊國), Le'an (樂安), Jinan (principality) (濟南國)
Bing	Shangdang (上黨), Xihe (西河), Taiyuan (太原), Leping (樂平), Xinxing (新興), Yanmen (雁門)
Si	Henan (河南尹), Hongnong (弘農), Henei (河內), Hedong (河東), Pingyang (平陽)
Yan	Taishan (泰山), Jibei (principality) (濟北國), Dongping (principality) (東平國), Dong (東), Rencheng (任城), Shanyang (山陽), Jiyin (濟陰), Chenliu (principality) (陳留國)
Xu	Dongguan (東莞), Langye (principality) (琅琊國), Donghai (principality) (東海國), Guangling (廣陵), Xiapi (下邳), Pengcheng (principality) (彭城國)
Yong	Jingzhao (京兆), Pingyi (馮翊), Fufeng (扶風), Beidi (北地), Xinping (新平), Anding (安定), Guangwei (廣魏), Tianshui (天水), Nan'an (南安), Longxi (隴西)
Yu	Chen (陳), Yingchuan (潁川), Runan (汝南), Liang (principality) (梁國), Pei (principality) (沛國), Qiao (譙), Lu (魯), Yiyang (弋陽), Anfeng (安豐)
Liang	Wuwei (武威), Jincheng (金城), Xiping (西平), Zhangye (張掖), Jiuquan (酒泉), Xihai (西海), Dunhuang (敦煌)
Yan	Huainan (淮南), Lujiang (廬江)
Jing	Jiangxia (江夏), Xiangyang (襄陽), Xincheng (新城), Nanyang (南陽), Nanxiang (南鄉), Shangyong (上庸), Weixing (魏興), Zhangling (Yiyang) (章陵 / 義陽)

== List of sovereigns ==
Cao Wei rulers
Temple name	Posthumous name	Family name (in bold) and personal name	Reign	Era names and their year ranges	Notes
(N/A)	Emperor Gao 高皇帝	**Cao** Teng 曹騰	(N/A)	(N/A)	Cao Teng's posthumous name was granted posthumously by Cao Rui.
(N/A)	Emperor Tai 太皇帝	**Cao** Song 曹嵩	(N/A)	(N/A)	Cao Song's posthumous name was granted posthumously by Cao Pi.
Taizu 太祖	Emperor Wu 武皇帝	**Cao** Cao 曹操	216–220	(N/A)	Cao Cao's temple and posthumous names were granted posthumously by Cao Pi.
Shizu 世祖	Emperor Wen 文皇帝	**Cao** Pi 曹丕	220–226	Huangchu 黃初 (220–226)	
Liezu 烈祖	Emperor Ming 明皇帝	**Cao** Rui 曹叡	227–239	Taihe 太和 (227–233); Qinglong 青龍 (233–237); Jingchu 景初 (237–239)	Cao Rui took the unprecedented step of deciding his own temple name.
(N/A)	(N/A)	**Cao** Fang 曹芳	240–249	Zhengshi 正始 (240–249); Jiaping 嘉平 (249–254)	Cao Fang became "Prince of Qi" (齊王) after his dethronement. He was posthumously granted the title "Duke Li of Shaoling" (邵陵厲公) in the Western Jin dynasty.
(N/A)	(N/A)	**Cao** Mao 曹髦	254–260	Zhengyuan 正元 (254–256); Ganlu 甘露 (256–260)	Cao Mao was granted the posthumous name of "Duke of Gaogui" (高貴鄉公).
(N/A)	Emperor Yuan 元皇帝	**Cao** Huan 曹奐	260–266	Jingyuan 景元 (260–264); Xianxi 咸熙 (264–266)	

== Cao Wei family tree ==
Cao Wei

- - - - - = The dashed line denotes an adoption

Cao Cao 曹操 155–220; Wudi 武帝
Cao Pi 曹丕 187–226; Wendi 文帝; 220–226	Cao Zhang 曹彰 189–223; Prince Wei of Rencheng 任城威王	Cao Yu 曹宇 d.278 Prince of Yan 燕王
Cao Rui 曹叡 205–239; Mingdi 明帝; 226–239	Cao Lin 曹霖 d. 249; Prince Ding of Donghai 東海定王	Cao Kai 曹楷; Prince of Jinan 济南王	Cao Huan 曹奐 246–303; Yuandi 元帝; 260–265
Cao Mao 曹髦 241–260; Duke of Gaogui; District 高貴鄉公; 254–260	Cao Fang 曹芳 232–274; Shaodi 少帝; 239–254

== See also ==
- Three Kingdoms
  - Shu Han
  - Eastern Wu
