= Guanqiu Jian =

Cao Wei general and politician (died 255)

- 毌丘儉

General Who Guards the East (鎮東將軍)
- In office 252 – 16 March 255
- Monarch: Cao Fang / Cao Mao
- Preceded by: Zhuge Dan

General Who Guards the South (鎮南將軍)
- In office ? – 252
- Monarch: Cao Fang

Inspector of Yu Province (豫州刺史)
- In office ? – 252
- Monarch: Cao Fang

General of the Left (左將軍)
- In office ?–?
- Monarch: Cao Fang

General Who Crosses into Liao (度遼將軍)
- In office c.235 – ?
- Monarch: Cao Rui / Cao Fang

Colonel Who Protects the Wuhuan (護烏丸校尉)
- In office c.235 – ?
- Monarch: Cao Rui

Inspector of You Province (幽州刺史)
- In office c.235 – ?
- Monarch: Cao Rui
- Preceded by: Wang Xiong (王雄)

Inspector of Jing Province (荊州刺史)
- In office ?–?
- Monarch: Cao Rui

Personal details
- Born: Unknown Wenxi County, Shanxi
- Died: 16 March 255 (Note: Cao Mao's biography in the Records of the Three Kingdoms recorded that Guanqiu Jian died on the jiachen day of the leap month of the 2nd year of the Zhengyuan era of Cao Mao's reign. This date corresponds to 16 March 255 in the Gregorian calendar.) Feidong County, Anhui
- Relations: Guanqiu Xiu (brother)
- Children: Guanqiu Dian; Guanqiu Zong; three other sons
- Parent: Guanqiu Xing (father)
- Occupation: Military general, politician
- Courtesy name: Zhonggong (仲恭)
- Peerage: Marquis of Anyi (安邑侯)

Guanqiu Jian (died 16 March 255), courtesy name Zhonggong, was a Chinese military general and politician of the state of Cao Wei during the Three Kingdoms period of China.

== Life ==
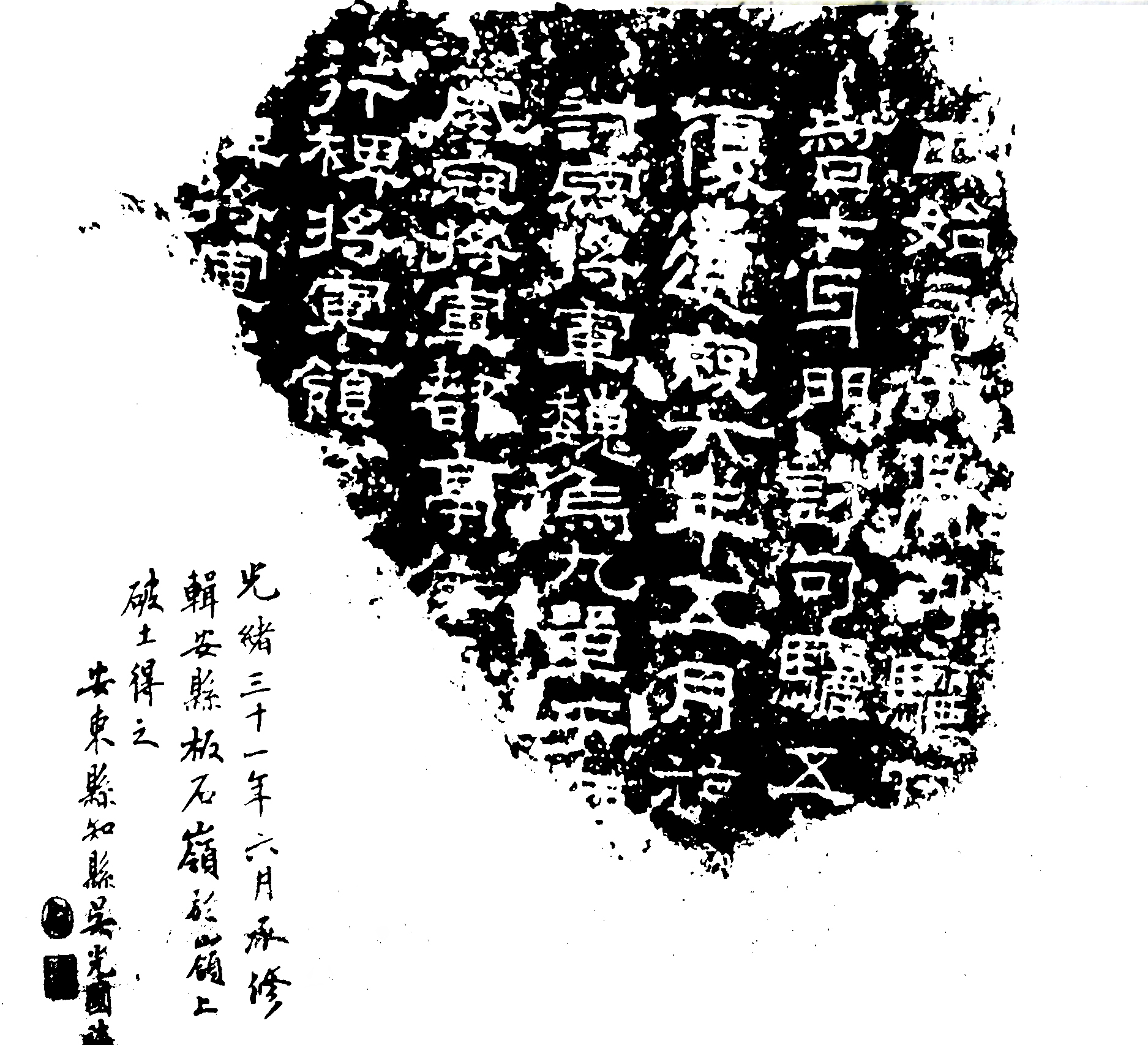
The rediscovered fragment of the Guanqiu Jian commemoration tablet.

Guanqiu Jian was from Wenxi County (聞喜縣), Hedong Commandery, which is present-day Wenxi County, Shanxi. His father, Guanqiu Xing (毌丘興; fl.210-220s), served as the Administrator of Anding Commandery under Cao Cao, and of Wuwei Commandery (武威郡) during Cao Pi's reign; he eventually held the peerage "Marquis of Gaoyang District" (高陽鄉侯). After his father's death, Guanqiu Jian inherited his father's peerage and served as a clerk to the Marquis of Pingyuan (平原侯).

In the second half of 226, after Cao Rui, the second emperor of Wei, ascended the throne, he appointed Guanqiu Jian as a Gentleman of Writing (尚書郎) and supervisor of the Imperial Guards. As Guanqiu Jian was previously an assistant official serving under Cao Rui when the latter was still crown prince, Cao Rui treated him exceptionally well. Guanqiu Jian later rose to the position of Agricultural Officer of Luoyang (洛陽典農). During this time, he wrote to Cao Rui, advising the emperor to scale down on his extravagant palace building projects. Later, he was promoted to Inspector (刺史) of Jing Province.

During the Qinglong era (233-237) of Cao Rui's reign, Cao Rui planned to conquer Liaodong. As Guanqiu Jian had a strategy in mind, he was appointed Inspector of You Province, General Who Crosses into Liao and Colonel Who Protects the Wuhuan.

In 237, Guanqiu Jian led an army to Liaodong to attack the warlord Gongsun Yuan, who had been previously a vassal of the Cao Wei state but decided to rebel against Wei rule. However, the campaign had to be aborted due to heavy flooding. In the following year, Guanqiu Jian and Sima Yi led another campaign against Gongsun Yuan, defeated him, and restored stability in Liaodong. In recognition of his efforts during the campaign, Cao Rui promoted Guanqiu Jian from a district marquis to a county marquis under the title "Marquis of Anyi" (安邑候).

In 244, during the reign of Cao Rui's successor Cao Fang, Guanqiu Jian led a punitive expedition to Goguryeo, leading to the Goguryeo–Wei Wars. He defeated the Goguryeo army led by King Dongcheon near the Tongjia River and then captured the Goguryeo capital Hwando. During the follow-up campaign in the next year, he conquered Hwando again and forced King Dongcheon to flee southeast. A subsection of the army reached the eastern coast of the peninsula and another reached northern Manchuria, but soon retreated. A stone carving was created to commemorate Guanqiu Jian's victory in the campaign. In 1905, a fragment of the monument was discovered. It is called the Stele of Guanqiu Jian's Inscribed Achievements (毌丘儉紀功碑).

In 255, Guanqiu Jian and Wen Qin started a rebellion in Shouchun (壽春; around present-day Shou County, Anhui) against the Wei regent Sima Shi, who came to power in 251 after the death of his father Sima Yi and monopolised state power, effectively rendering the Wei emperor a puppet ruler. In Guanqiu Jian's biography in Sanguozhi, Chen Shou recorded that Guanqiu Jian rebelled because he remained loyal to the Wei emperor, Cao Mao, and was displeased that Sima Shi was controlling the Wei government behind the scenes. Chen also recorded that Guanqiu was close to Xiahou Xuan and Li Feng, who had been purged by Sima Shi in 254 around the time Sima Shi deposed the third Wei emperor Cao Fang and replaced him with Cao Mao; Guanqiu Jian, fearing that he would end up like Xiahou Xuan, decided to rebel against Sima Shi. The rebellion was effectively suppressed within months and Guanqiu Jian was slain by one Zhang Shu (張屬) after escaping from Shouchun to Shen County (慎縣; present-day Feidong County, Anhui). Most of Guanqiu Jian's family members were killed while the survivors escaped and defected to Wei's rival state, Eastern Wu.

== Name ==
Guanqiu Jian's name is often read as Wuqiu Jian (毋丘儉), and appears as such in Volume 73 of Sima Guang's Zizhi Tongjian. Chinese scholar Wu Jinhua (吳金華) argued that Guanqiu (毌丘) was a later transcription error dating back to the Tang and Song dynasties, and that Wuqiu (毋丘) - alongside Manqiu (曼丘) - were alternative readings of the original reading Muqiu (母丘). He supports his argument with the occurrence of Muqiu as a family name on a tomb stele from the Three Kingdoms period and also in the Ri Zhi Lu (日知錄) by early Qing dynasty scholar Gu Yanwu; as well as the occurrence of Wuqiu as a surname on an ancient seal and a bamboo strip from the Yinwan (尹灣) Han-period tomb excavated in 1993. Wu also points out that a general named Manqiu Chen (曼丘臣) is mentioned in the second part of Emperor Gao's biography in the Book of Han, and that an annotation by the Tang dynasty historian Yan Shigu mentions that "Manqiu and Muqiu were originally the same family name".

== See also ==
- Lists of people of the Three Kingdoms

== Sources ==
- Chen, Shou (3rd century). Records of the Three Kingdoms (Sanguozhi).
- Pei, Songzhi (5th century). Annotated Records of the Three Kingdoms (Sanguozhi zhu).
- Wu, Jinhua (2001). "Sanguo Zhi Jiaoyi Xuli" (三國志斠議續例). Wenshi (文史).
