= Cao Mao =

Cao Wei emperor from 254 to 260

Cao Mao 曹髦

Emperor of Cao Wei
- Reign: 2 November 254 – 2 June 260
- Predecessor: Cao Fang
- Successor: Cao Huan
- Regent: Sima Shi; Sima Zhao

Duke of Gaogui District (高貴鄉公)
- Tenure: 244 – 1 November 254
- Born: 241 (Note: Cao Mao's biography in the Sanguozhi recorded that he died on the jichou day of the 5th month of the 5th year of the Ganlu era of his reign. He was 20 years old (by East Asian age reckoning) when he died. His death date corresponds to 2 June 260 in the Gregorian calendar. By calculation, his year of birth was in 241 since he died when he was 19 years old in 260.)
- Died: 2 June 260; Luoyang, Henan
- Consorts: Empress Bian
Names
- Family name: Cao (曹); Given name: Mao (髦); Courtesy name: Yanshi (彥士)
Era dates
- Zhengyuan (正元): 254–256; Ganlu (甘露): 256–260
- House: House of Cao
- Father: Cao Lin, Prince Ding of Donghai

Cao Mao (241 – 2 June 260), courtesy name Yanshi, was the fourth emperor of the state of Cao Wei during the Three Kingdoms period of China. He was a grandson of Cao Pi, the first emperor of Wei. Described as intelligent and studious, Cao Mao made repeated attempts to seize back state power from the regent Sima Zhao but failed. He was killed in an abortive coup d'état against Sima Zhao.

== Family background and accession to the throne ==
Cao Mao was a son of Cao Lin, the Prince of Donghai (東海王), a son of Cao Pi. In 244, at the age of three, in accordance with Wei's regulations that the sons of princes (other than the first-born son of the prince's wife, customarily designated as the prince's heir) were to be instated as dukes, Cao Mao was enfeoffed as the "Duke of Gaogui District" (高貴鄉公). Cao Lin died in 249 when Cao Mao was eight. Cao Mao's elder brother, Cao Qi (曹啟), succeeded their father as the Prince of Donghai.

By 254, state power was in the control of the Sima clan, whose patriarch Sima Yi had seized power from the regent Cao Shuang in 249. After Sima Yi's death in 251, the Sima clan was led by his eldest son, Sima Shi. In 254, after falsely accusing Cao Fang's father-in-law Zhang Ji and Zhang's associates Li Feng and Xiahou Xuan of treason, Sima Shi had them and their clans executed. When Cao Fang himself considered a coup against the Simas later that year, Sima Shi had him deposed.

It was at this time that Cao Fang's stepmother, Empress Dowager Guo, made a last-ditch attempt at preserving the Cao clan's imperial authority by injecting herself into the process of selecting the next emperor. When Sima Shi notified her that he intended to make Cao Pi's brother, the Prince of Pengcheng Cao Ju, the new emperor, she managed to persuade him that such a succession would be improper since Cao Ju was the uncle of her husband Cao Rui, and such a succession would leave Cao Rui effectively without an heir. Sima Shi was forced to agree with her to let Cao Mao be the emperor. (Note: Cao Mao, although young (at age 13) was known for his intelligence and Empress Dowager Guo might have believed that he, alone, of the princes and dukes might have had a chance of counteracting the Simas.) When Sima Shi asked her for the imperial seal, she again reasoned with him and refused politely under the reasoning that she had met Cao Mao before and wanted to personally hand him the seal. When Cao Mao was summoned to the capital, he acted in accordance with the ceremonies due a duke rather than putting on imperial pretensions immediately until he was enthroned. This earned him popular support and praise as a humble young emperor.

== Reign ==
In 255, generals Guanqiu Jian and Wen Qin started a rebellion against the Sima clan in Shouchun, but were quickly crushed by Sima Shi's forces. Guanqiu Jian was killed and his clan was slaughtered. Wen Qin and his sons, Wen Yang and Wen Hu (文虎), fled to the rival state of Eastern Wu. Sima Shi died of illness shortly after the rebellion was suppressed. In the aftermath of Sima Shi's death, a 14-year-old Cao Mao made another effort to seize back state power. He issued an imperial edict for Sima Shi's successor, Sima Zhao, to remain at Xuchang using the excuse that the situation at Shouchun was still not completely peaceful. He also recalled Sima Zhao's assistant, Fu Gu, to return to the capital with the troops. However, on the advice of Fu Gu and Zhong Hui, Sima Zhao ignored the edict and returned to Luoyang and continued to remain in control of the government.

Over the next few years, Cao Mao gradually established a circle of people around him, including Sima Zhao's cousin Sima Wang, Wang Shen, Pei Xiu and Zhong Hui, all of whom were known for their literary talent. These people were unquestioned in their support for the Sima clan, but they might also have something to gain if they pledged allegiance to Cao Mao. In doing so, Cao Mao was hoping that he could reduce Sima Zhao's suspicions against him while winning support from these people. He often held meetings with them to discuss literature. In addition, he gave Sima Wang a fast two-wheeled wagon and five imperial guardsmen as escorts because Sima Wang lived further away from the palace than the others.

Around 257, Zhuge Dan, who replaced Guanqiu Jian as military commander in Shouchun, started a rebellion against Sima Zhao with support from the rival state of Eastern Wu. Sima Zhao led an army to suppress the revolt and trapped the rebels in the city by early 258. Internal conflict broke out in Shouchun between Zhuge Dan and Wen Qin (Note: Wen returned from Eastern Wu to support the revolt.) which concluded with Wen Qin's death at Zhuge Dan's hands and the defection of Wen Qin's sons to Sima Zhao. Shouchun eventually fell to Sima Zhao's forces and the rebellion was effectively crushed. In 259, Cao Mao received reports of sightings of yellow dragons (Note: a sign of divine favour) in two wells. He commented that it was actually a sign of divine disfavour and wrote a poem titled Ode to the Hidden Dragon (濳龍詩):

The poor dragon is trapped, alone and cold;
He cannot leap out of the depths;
He cannot rise to the heavens;
He cannot even descend onto fields.

The poor dragon fell into the deep well;
Even catfish dance before him;
He hides his teeth and claws and sighs;
And I am this depressed as well?

The poem greatly displeased Sima Zhao, who would pay more attention to Cao Mao's activities afterwards. In 258, under pressure from Sima Zhao, Cao Mao issued an edict granting him the nine bestowments, but Sima Zhao declined.

== Attempted coup against Sima Zhao and death ==
In c.May 260, Cao Mao was again forced to issue an edict granting Sima Zhao the title of Duke of Jin and the nine bestowments; which Sima Zhao earnestly declined nine times, and after being forced to do so again, he declined them yet another time, which only managed to irritate Cao Mao further. Cao Mao gathered his associates Wang Shen, Wang Jing and Wang Ye, and announced his plan for a last effort against Sima Zhao to regain his power. Wang Shen and Wang Ye went to warn Sima Zhao. Personally armed with a sword, Cao Mao led his personal guard to go from the palace to attack Sima Zhao. Sima Zhao's brother, Sima Zhou, led a defence at a gate but was routed. Jia Chong led another defense at the southern watchtower and ordered his officer Cheng Ji to kill Cao Mao. Cheng Ji stabbed Cao Mao in the chest with a spear, killing him.

Sima Zhao forced Empress Dowager Guo to publish an order accusing Cao Mao of plotting to attack her and posthumously strip Cao Mao of rank, in order to present the attack as primarily aimed against the empress dowager rather than himself. Sima Zhao with his uncle, Sima Fu, and the other high ministers then requested Sima Zhao to have Cao Mao posthumously reinstated as a duke and buried with honours befitting a prince – for appearances of leniency. However, Sima Zhao refused so Cao Mao was not buried with honours befitting a prince. Sima Zhao also retroactively declined his title as Duke of Jin and the nine bestowments.

Sima Zhao blamed Cheng Ji for the regicide, and ordered his familial extermination. Cao Huang (later renamed to Cao Huan), the Duke of Changdao, was enthroned as the new emperor as a result, the last puppet emperor of Wei before Sima Zhao's son, Sima Yan, usurped the Wei throne in February 266.

== Descendants ==
Tang dynasty artist Cao Ba (曹霸) was a descendant of Cao Mao.

== Era names ==
- Zhengyuan (正元) 254–256
- Ganlu (甘露) 256–260

== Consorts ==
- Empress Bian, third cousin

== See also ==
- Cao Wei family trees
- Lists of people of the Three Kingdoms
- List of Chinese monarchs

== Notes ==
Cao Mao House of Cao Born: 241 Died: 260
Regnal titles
Preceded by Cao Fang	Emperor of Cao Wei; 254–260 with Sima Shi (254–255); Sima Zhao (255–260)	Succeeded by Cao Huan
Titles in pretence
Preceded by Cao Fang	— TITULAR — Emperor of China; 254–260; Reason for succession failure: Three Kingdoms	Succeeded by Cao Huan
