= Jiang Wei =

Chinese Shu Han state general (202-264)

- 姜維
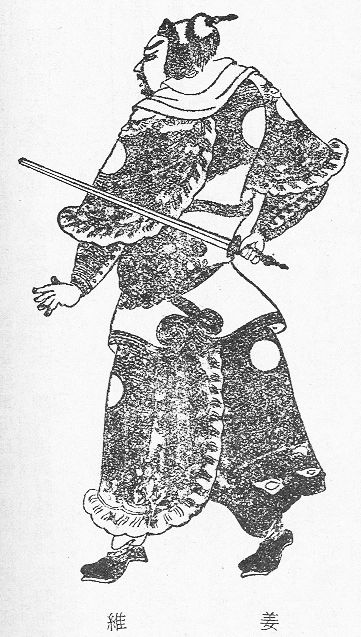
- A Qing dynasty illustration of Jiang Wei

General-in-Chief (大將軍)
- In office 258 – November or December 263
- In office 256 – 256
- Monarch: Liu Shan
- Preceded by: Fei Yi

General of the Rear (後將軍)
- In office 256 – 258
- Monarch: Liu Shan

General of the Guards (衛將軍)
- In office 247 – 256
- Monarch: Liu Shan

Manager of the Affairs of the Masters of Writing (錄尚書事) (jointly held with Fei Yi from 247 to 253)
- In office 247 – November or December 263
- Monarch: Liu Shan

Inspector of Liang Province (涼州刺史) (nominal)
- In office 243 – 247
- Monarch: Liu Shan

Senior General Who Guards the West (鎮西大將軍)
- In office 243 – 247
- Monarch: Liu Shan

General Who Assists Han (輔漢將軍)
- In office 234 – 243
- Monarch: Liu Shan

General Who Attacks the West (征西將軍)
- In office ? – 234
- Monarch: Liu Shan
- Chancellor: Zhuge Liang

General Who Upholds Righteousness (奉義將軍)
- In office 228 – ?
- Monarch: Liu Shan
- Chancellor: Zhuge Liang

Personal details
- Born: 202 (Note: Jiang Wei's biography in the Sanguozhi recorded that he was 27 (by East Asian age reckoning) when he defected from Wei to Shu in 228. Zhong Hui's biography in the Sanguozhi recorded that Zhong Hui and Jiang Wei both died on the 18th day of the 1st month in the 5th year of the Jing'yuan era of Cao Huan's reign. This date corresponds to 3 March 264 in the Gregorian calendar. By calculation, Jiang Wei's year of birth should be 202 and he was 62 when he died in 264.) Gangu County, Gansu
- Died: 3 March 264 (aged 62) Chengdu, Sichuan
- Parent: Jiang Jiong (father)
- Occupation: Military general, politician
- Courtesy name: Boyue (伯約)
- Peerage: Marquis of Pingxiang (平襄侯)

Jiang Wei (202 – 3 March 264), courtesy name Boyue, was a Chinese military general and politician of the state of Shu Han during the Three Kingdoms period of China.

Born in Ji County (present-day Gangu County, Gansu), Jiang Wei started his career as a military officer in his native Tianshui Commandery, which was a territory of Wei. In 228, when Wei's rival state Shu launched an invasion led by Zhuge Liang, Jiang Wei was distrusted by Ma Zun, then administrator of Tianshui Commandery. As such, Jiang Wei had to defect to Shu. Zhuge Liang, the Imperial Chancellor and regent of Shu, highly regarded Jiang Wei and appointed him as a general in Shu. After Zhuge Liang's death in 234, Jiang Wei continued serving as a military commander during the regencies Jiang Wan and Fei Yi, eventually rising to the highest military rank of General-In-Chief (大將軍) after Fei Yi's death in 253. Between 240 and 262, he continued Zhuge Liang's legacy of waging war against Wei by leading another 11 military campaigns. However, Jiang Wei's campaigns were relatively constrained in terms of both scale and duration due to Shu's limited resources and inadequate food supplies, as well as internal political faultlines. In 263, when Wei launched a massive invasion of Shu, Jiang Wei led Shu forces to resist the invaders at Tazhong, Yinping and Jiange, himself defending Jiange which was under Zhong Hui's attack. While Jiang Wei managed to temporarily stall Wei's main force led by Zhong Hui, Deng Ai, another military commander of Wei, took a shortcut via Yinping and showed up at Chengdu unexpectedly. Liu Shan surrendered to Deng Ai without putting up resistance and ordered Jiang Wei to surrender to the Wei general Zhong Hui; this event marked the end of Shu's existence. In the following year, Jiang Wei instigated Zhong Hui to launch a rebellion in Chengdu against the Wei regent Sima Zhao and hoped to use the opportunity to gain military power and restore Shu. However, some of Zhong Hui's officers were unwilling to participate in the rebellion and started a mutiny, killing Jiang Wei and Zhong Hui.

== Family background ==
Jiang Wei was from Ji County (simplified Chinese: 兾縣; traditional Chinese: 冀縣), Tianshui Commandery (天水郡), which is present-day Gangu County, Gansu. His clan also prominently regarded as the head of “Four clans of Tianshui”. As his father died early, Jiang Wei grew up with his mother and was known for his interest in the writings of the Confucian scholar Zheng Xuan.

The Fu Zi recorded that Jiang Wei was a fame-seeking person with great ambitions. He also secretly raised a private militia, and not interested with any civilian’s occupation.

== Early career in Wei ==
Jiang Wei began his career in his native Tianshui Commandery, which was a territory of the state of Wei during the Three Kingdoms period. He started out as a clerk in charge of records and later became an assistant officer under the commandery administrator. After considering that his father died in service, the Wei government commissioned Jiang Wei as a zhonglang (中郎) and allowed him to participate in military affairs in Tianshui Commandery.

== Defection to Shu ==
=== Sanguozhi account ===
In the spring of 228, Zhuge Liang, the Imperial Chancellor and regent of Wei's rival state Shu, launched the first of a series of military campaigns against Wei. He occupied Mount Qi (祁山; the mountainous regions around present-day Li County, Gansu) and deployed his troops there in orderly formations. Three Wei-controlled commanderies – Nan'an (南安; around present-day Longxi County, Gansu), Tianshui and Anding (安定; around present-day Zhenyuan County, Gansu) – responded to the invasion by defecting to the Shu side.

Jiang Wei's biography in the Sanguozhi recorded that at the time, Jiang Wei and his colleagues Liang Xu, Yin Shang and Liang Qian (Note: The Sanguozhi recorded that Liang Xu (梁緒), Yin Shang (尹賞) and Liang Qian (梁虔) defected to Shu together with Jiang Wei. They later served in high positions in the Shu government: Liang Xu became Minister Herald (大鴻臚); Yin Shang became Bearer of the Mace (執金吾); Liang Qian became Empress's Chamberlain (大長秋). All three of them died before the fall of Shu in 263.) were out on an inspection tour with Ma Zun (馬遵), the Administrator of Tianshui Commandery. When Ma Zun learnt of the Shu invasion and heard that many counties in Tianshui Commandery had defected to the enemy, he suspected that Jiang Wei and the others were going to betray him so he fled overnight and took shelter in Shanggui County (上邽縣; within present-day Tianshui, Gansu).

By the time Jiang Wei and his colleagues realised that Ma Zun had abandoned them and fled on his own, they attempted to catch up with him but it was too late. They were denied entry when they showed up at Shanggui County, so Jiang Wei led them to his home county, Ji County (兾縣; 冀縣; present-day Gangu County, Gansu). However, the official in charge of Ji County also refused to allow them to enter. Faced with no other choice, Jiang Wei and his colleagues surrendered and defected to Shu.

=== Alternative account in the Weilüe ===
The Weilüe recorded a different account of Jiang Wei's defection from Wei to Shu.

At the time of the Shu invasion, Ma Zun and his subordinates (including Jiang Wei) were on an inspection tour with the Wei general Guo Huai when they received news that Zhuge Liang and the Shu army had occupied Mount Qi. After telling Ma Zun that Zhuge Liang was "up to no good", Guo Huai wanted to quickly head back to Shanggui County in the east of Tianshui Commandery. Even though his headquarters was at Ji County in the west, Ma Zun did not want to go back because he feared that there would be unrest in Ji County in light of the Shu invasion. He decided to join Guo Huai and move to Shanggui County instead.

When Jiang Wei urged Ma Zun to return to Ji County, the latter told him and the others: "If you go back, then you will become my enemy." Jiang Wei ignored Ma Zun because he was worried about the safety of his family in Ji County, so he parted ways with Ma Zun and returned to Ji County with his colleague Shangguan Zixiu (上官子脩) and others.

When Jiang Wei returned to Ji County, the people welcomed him back and insisted that he meet Zhuge Liang. Jiang Wei and Shangguan Zixiu relented and went to see Zhuge Liang, who was delighted to meet them. By the time Jiang Wei wanted to go back to Ji County to fetch his family members (mother, wife and child(ren)), Wei forces under Zhang He and Fei Yao had defeated the Shu vanguard at the Battle of Jieting. Unable to return to Ji County and left with no other option, Jiang Wei decided to defect to Shu and follow Zhuge Liang. After Wei forces recaptured Ji County, they took Jiang Wei's family members captive but did not execute them because they knew that Jiang Wei did not originally intend to defect to the enemy. Jiang Wei's family members were thus imprisoned.

== During Zhuge Liang's regency ==
After returning to Hanzhong Commandery, Zhuge Liang appointed Jiang Wei as an Assistant official in charge of food supplies (倉曹掾). Later, Jiang Wei was commissioned as General Who Upholds Righteousness (奉義將軍) and enfeoffed as the Marquis of Dangyang Village (當陽亭侯).

Jiang Wei was subsequently promoted to the rank of General Who Attacks the West (征西將軍) and given the appointment of Central Army Supervisor (中監軍).

== During Jiang Wan's regency ==
Following Zhuge Liang's death at the Battle of Wuzhang Plains in the autumn of 234, Jiang Wei returned to the Shu capital Chengdu and was reassigned to serve as Right Army Supervisor (右監軍) with the rank of General Who Assists Han (輔漢將軍). He was put in command of Chengdu's armed forces and promoted from a village marquis to a county marquis under the title "Marquis of Pingxiang" (平襄侯).

In 238, Jiang Wei accompanied the Shu regent Jiang Wan to Hanzhong Commandery near the Wei–Shu border. After Jiang Wan was appointed Grand Marshal (大司馬) in April or May 239, he appointed Jiang Wei as a Major (司馬) under him. He also put Jiang Wei in charge of a separate force to make incursions into Wei territory.

=== First Northern Expedition ===
In 240, Jiang Wei led Shu forces to attack the Wei-controlled Longxi Commandery but was driven back by Wei forces under Guo Huai's command.

Three years later, Jiang Wei was promoted to the rank of Senior General Who Guards the West (鎮西大將軍) and appointed as the nominal Inspector of Liang Province (涼州刺史).

== During Fei Yi's regency ==
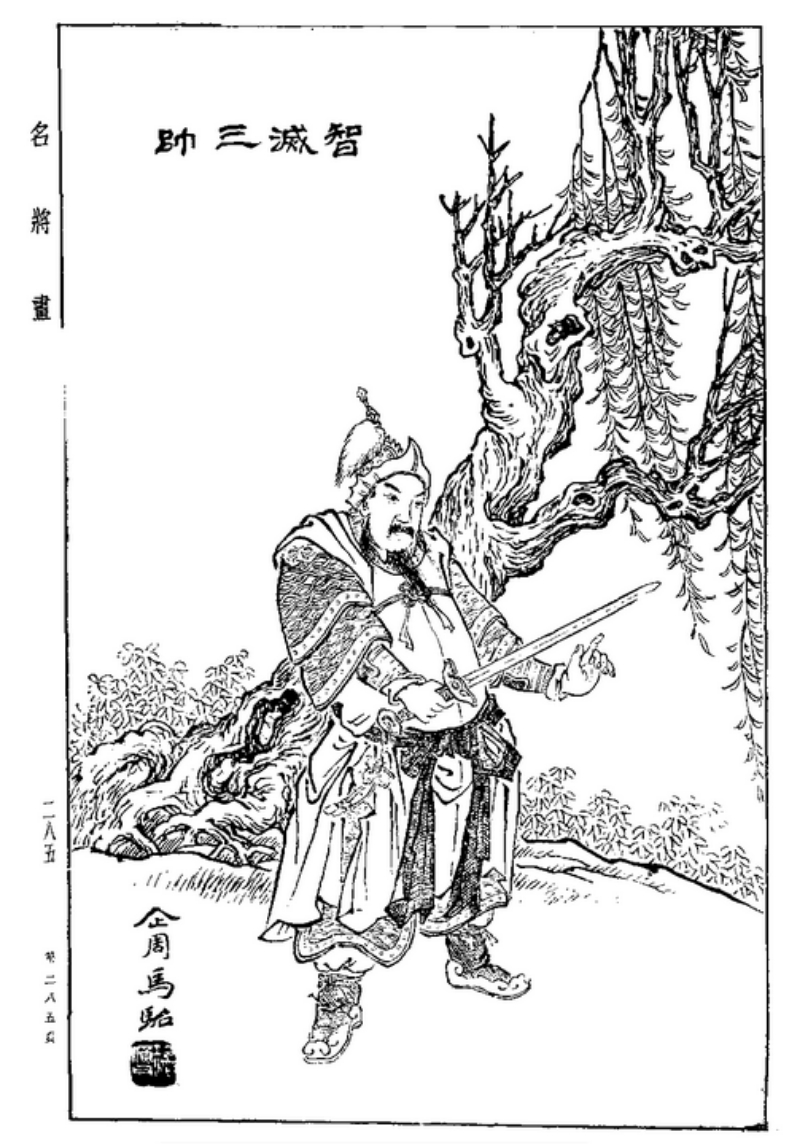
Jiang Wei

Following Jiang Wan's death in 246, Fei Yi became the regent of Shu.

A year later, Jiang Wei was promoted to General of the Guards (衞將軍). He also shared power with Fei Yi by jointly holding the office of Manager of the Affairs of the Masters of Writing (錄尚書事) with him.

In the same year, Jiang Wei suppressed a rebellion in Pingkang County (平康縣; southwest of present-day Songpan County, Sichuan).

=== Second Northern Expedition ===
In 247, the Qiang tribes started a rebellion against Wei in four commanderies in Yong and Liang provinces, and called for support from Shu. Baihuwen (白虎文) and Zhiwudai (治無戴), two tribal kings in Liang Province, responded by rebelling against Wei. When Jiang Wei led Shu forces into Liang Province to support the Qiang rebels, Baihuwen and Zhiwudai led their forces to join him.

In response, the Wei government sent Xiahou Ba and Guo Huai to lead troops to suppress the rebellion and repel the Shu invasion. Jiang Wei attacked Xiahou Ba's position at the west of the Tao River but retreated back to Shu when Wei reinforcements led by Guo Huai showed up.

=== Third Northern Expedition ===
In 248, Jiang Wei led Shu forces from Shiying (石營; northwest of present-day Xihe County, Gansu) to Qiangchuan (彊川; west of present-day Lintan County, Gansu) to rendezvous with the tribal king Zhiwudai (治無戴), who had recently been defeated by the Wei general Guo Huai at Longyi County (龍夷縣; west of present-day Huangyuan County, Qinghai) He left his subordinate Liao Hua behind to guard the fortress at Chengzhong Mountain (成重山; located west of present-day Lintao County, Gansu).

Guo Huai split his army into two groups with the aim of preventing Jiang Wei from meeting up and combining forces with Zhiwudai. He led one group to attack Liao Hua at Chengzhong Mountain to force Jiang Wei to turn back to save Liao Hua. At the same time, he ordered his subordinate Xiahou Ba to attack Jiang Wei and push him back towards Tazhong (沓中; northwest of present-day Zhugqu County, Gansu). Guo Huai's plan succeeded as Jiang Wei turned back to save Liao Hua when he learnt that Chengzhong Mountain was under attack. In doing so, he failed to meet up with Zhiwudai and eventually retreated back to Shu.

=== Fourth Northern Expedition ===
In the autumn of 249, after he was granted acting imperial authority by the Shu emperor Liu Shan, Jiang Wei led Shu forces to attack the Wei-controlled Yong Province and gained support from the Qiang tribes. He had two fortresses constructed at Qushan (麴山; southeast of present-day Min County, Gansu).

In response to the Shu invasion, the Wei general Guo Huai ordered his subordinates Chen Tai, Xu Zhi and Deng Ai to besiege the two fortresses and cut off their supply routes.

When Jiang Wei led troops from Mount Niutou (牛頭山; west of present-day Zhaohua District, Guangyuan, Sichuan) to reinforce the two fortresses, Chen Tai led a Wei army to block his path. At the same time, Chen Tai sought help from Guo Huai, who led his troops across the Tao River to attack Jiang Wei's base at Mount Niutou. Jiang Wei became fearful so he pulled back all his troops and abandoned the two fortresses.

Three days after his apparent retreat, Jiang Wei sent Liao Hua to lead a small force to distract Deng Ai at Baishui (白水; in present-day Qingchuan County, Sichuan) while he led the main army to attack Taocheng (洮城; northeast of present-day Min County, Gansu). Deng Ai saw through Jiang Wei's ruse and immediately dispatched reinforcements to Taocheng. Jiang Wei failed to capture Taocheng as Deng Ai had already strengthened its defences so he withdrew all his troops and returned to Shu.

=== Fifth expedition (250) ===
In 250, Jiang Wei led Shu forces to attack the Wei-controlled Xiping Commandery (西平郡; around present-day Xining, Qinghai). He retreated after failing to capture Xiping.

=== Fei Yi's restrictions on Jiang Wei's campaigns ===
Jiang Wei believed that his familiarity with the Qiang and other peoples of the northwest, together with his military ability, would allow him to seize the Wei-held lands west of Long if he could enlist their support.

Fei Yi, however, repeatedly rejected Jiang Wei's proposals for a major offensive and generally limited him to no more than 10,000 troops.

The Han Jin Chunqiu (漢晉春秋) recorded that Fei Yi once told Jiang Wei: "We aren’t as brilliant as the Imperial Chancellor. If even he can't stabilise the Empire, what makes you think we can do it? Wouldn't it be better to defend our state, govern our people well, respect and safeguard his legacy, and pass it on to future generations? Stop your wishful thinking that you can achieve victory in one fell swoop. If you fail, it will be too late for regrets."

=== Fei Yi's assassination ===
On 16 February 253, Fei Yi was assassinated during a party on the first day of the Chinese New Year. The assassin, Guo Xiu (郭脩), was a Wei civilian captured in battle by Jiang Wei. After reluctantly surrendering to Shu, he attempted to assassinate Liu Shan but failed to get close to the emperor so he switched his target to Fei Yi and succeeded. Fei Yi's death allowed Jiang Wei to gain greater control over the Shu military and continue waging war against Wei.

== Jiang Wei's Northern Expeditions ==
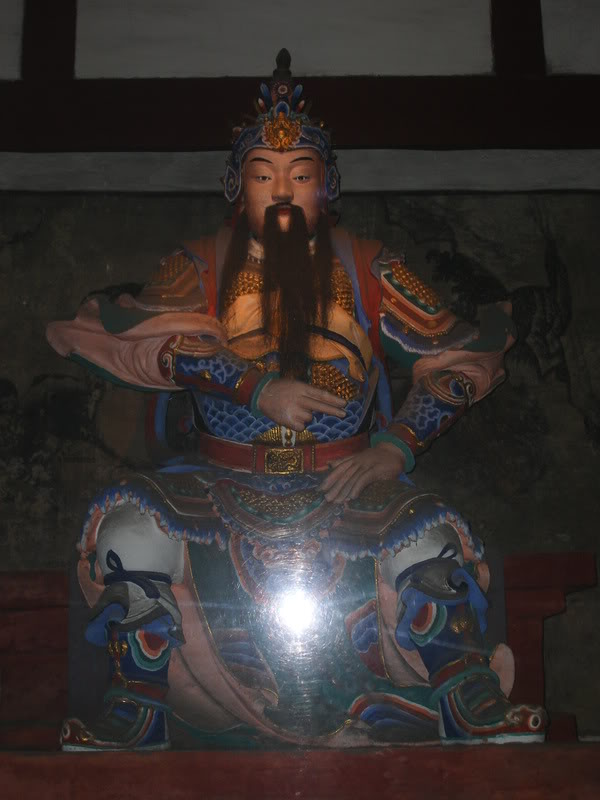
A statue of Jiang Wei in Zhuge Liang's temple in Chengdu. It was made in 1672.

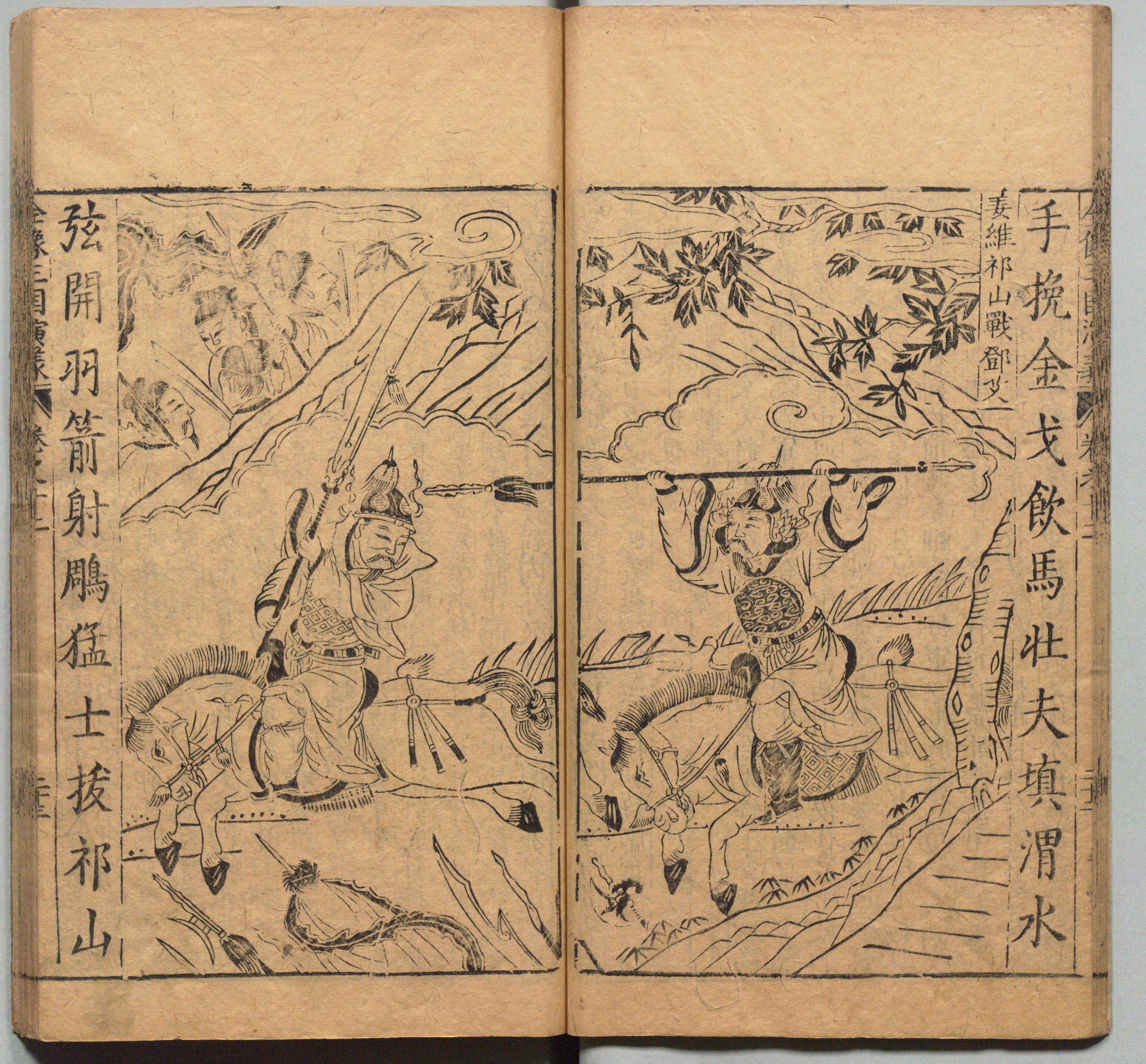
Fictionalized woodblock print illustration of Jiang Wei challenging Deng Ai, from Ming dynasty copy of the Romance of the Three Kingdoms.

=== Sixth Northern Expedition ===
In the summer of 253, Jiang Wei led tens of thousands of Shu troops from Shiying (石營; northwest of present-day Xihe County, Gansu). The Sanguozhi records that he besieged Nan'an, while the Zizhi Tongjian names Didao (狄道; around present-day Lintao County, Gansu). In response to the Shu invasion, the Wei regent Sima Shi ordered his generals Guo Huai and Chen Tai to lead the Wei forces stationed in the Guanzhong region to attack the invaders and lift the siege. Chen Tai advanced to Luomen (洛門; in present-day Wushan County, Gansu), and Jiang Wei withdrew when the Shu army ran out of food supplies.

=== Seventh Northern Expedition ===
In the summer of 254, after the Shu government granted him authority to oversee internal and external military affairs, Jiang Wei led Shu forces to attack the Wei-controlled Longxi Commandery again. Li Jian (李簡), the Wei official in charge of Didao (狄道; around present-day Lintao County, Gansu), surrendered to Jiang Wei. Jiang Wei then pressed further to attack Xiangwu County (襄武縣; southeast of present-day Longxi County, Gansu) and engaged the Wei general Xu Zhi in battle. Xu Zhi was defeated and killed, but the Shu army also lost the general Zhang Ni. The victorious Shu forces then occupied three counties – Didao, Heguan (河關; in the vicinity of present-day Dingxi, Gansu) and Lintao – and forced the residents to relocate to Shu-controlled territory.

=== Eighth Northern Expedition ===
In 255, despite strong objection from a fellow Shu general Zhang Yi, Jiang Wei went ahead with another campaign against Wei and even brought along Zhang Yi as his deputy. As the massive Shu army prepared to attack Didao (狄道; present-day Lintao County, Gansu), Wang Jing, the Wei governor of Yong Province, sought help from the Wei general Chen Tai.

After suffering a disastrous defeat against Shu forces at the west bank of the Tao River, Wang Jing and his remaining men retreated to Didao and took shelter inside the fortress. When Jiang Wei wanted to take advantage of the momentum to press on and besiege Didao, Zhang Yi advised him to stop advancing further because they would risk losing everything they had gained so far. Jiang Wei ignored him and ordered his forces to surround Didao.

In the meantime, Chen Tai, Deng Ai, Sima Fu and other Wei officers led reinforcements to Didao to save Wang Jing. Chen Tai led his troops to the hills southeast of Didao, where they lit more fires and beat their war drums loudly to let the Wei forces in Didao know that reinforcements were on the way. As a result, the Wei forces in Didao experienced a surge in morale, and the Shu forces were taken by surprise. At the same time, Chen Tai also spread false news that they were planning to cut off the Shu army's retreat route. When Jiang Wei heard about it, he became fearful so on 11 November 255 he withdrew all the Shu forces and retreated to Zhongti (鐘堤; south of present-day Lintao County, Gansu).

=== Ninth Northern Expedition ===
In the spring of 256, the Shu emperor Liu Shan promoted Jiang Wei to the position of General-in-Chief (大將軍). In autumn, Jiang Wei led Shu forces from Zhongti (鐘堤; south of present-day Lintao County, Gansu) to conquer Mount Qi (祁山; the mountainous regions around present-day Li County, Gansu) but failed because the Wei general Deng Ai had anticipated the attack and already set up strong defences. Jiang Wei then attacked Deng Ai at Mount Wucheng (武城山; in present-day Chencang District, Baoji, Shaanxi) but was driven back. Later, he led his troops across the Wei River to launch a coordinated strike on Shanggui County (上邽縣; in present-day Tianshui, Gansu) with another Shu force led by Hu Ji. However, Hu Ji failed to show up in time so Jiang Wei came under attack by Deng Ai and his army sustained heavy casualties.

As the Northern Expeditions took a huge toll on Shu's population and resources, the people increasingly resented Jiang Wei for his warmongering behaviour. In order to appease public anger, Jiang Wei wrote a memorial to the Shu imperial court to take full responsibility for the failure of the ninth Northern Expedition and requested to be demoted as punishment. Liu Shan approved Jiang Wei's request and demoted him to the position of General of the Rear (後將軍) but allowed him to remain as acting General-in-Chief (大將軍).

=== Tenth Northern Expedition ===
In 257, when the Wei general Zhuge Dan started a rebellion in Shouchun (壽春; present-day Shou County, Anhui), Jiang Wei decided to take advantage of the situation to stage another invasion of Wei. He led Shu forces to attack the Wei garrisons near the Great Wall which were well-stocked with supplies but poorly defended. The Wei forces stationed there started panicking when they heard of the Shu army's approach.

The Wei generals Sima Wang and Deng Ai led separate armies to the Great Wall to resist the Shu invaders. Jiang Wei then retreated to Mangshui (芒水; southeast of present-day Zhouzhi County, Shaanxi) and set up a camp there with its back facing a mountain. When the Wei forces encircled his position, Jiang Wei tried to taunt them to attack his camp but Sima Wang and Deng Ai ordered their troops to ignore the enemy and refrain from attacking.

In 258, after Jiang Wei received news that Wei forces had suppressed Zhuge Dan's rebellion, he withdrew his troops and returned to the Shu capital Chengdu. The Shu emperor Liu Shan restored him to the position of General-in-Chief (大將軍).

At the time, having seen year after year of battles against Wei, the people of Shu were growing tired of having to endure the costs and effects of war. The Shu official Qiao Zhou also wrote the "Chou Guo Lun" (仇國論; "Disquisition on Rivalling States"), a satirical piece criticising Jiang Wei for his warmongering behaviour.

=== Eleventh Northern Expedition ===
In the winter of 262, Jiang Wei led Shu forces to occupy Taoyang County (洮陽縣; in present-day Lintao County, Gansu) and attack Wei forces led by Deng Ai at Houhe County (侯和縣) but they lost the battle. He retreated to Tazhong (沓中; northwest of present-day Zhugqu County, Gansu) and garrisoned there.

=== Huang Hao's rise to power ===
Jiang Wei knew that given his background as a defector from Wei, he had to prove his loyalty to Shu so he was eager to gain glory in battle. However, despite leading eleven campaigns against Wei, he had not made any significant achievements. While he was away at the frontline, the palace eunuch Huang Hao, whom the emperor Liu Shan favoured, gradually gained power in the Shu government and dominated the political scene. Huang Hao had a close partnership with the Shu general Yan Yu (閻宇) and he considered replacing Jiang Wei with Yan Yu as General-in-Chief. Jiang Wei had long suspected that Huang Hao had something against him so he remained in Tazhong (沓中; northwest of present-day Zhugqu County, Gansu) and did not return to Chengdu after the eleventh Northern Expedition.

The Chronicles of Huayang recorded that Jiang Wei hated Huang Hao for his power-grabbing behaviour and once advised Liu Shan to execute the eunuch. However, Liu Shan refused and said: "Huang Hao is but a servant running errands for me. In the past, I was annoyed by Dong Yun's deep hatred of him. Sir, why do you need to take this so personally?" Jiang Wei soon realised that he had a mistake in advising Liu Shan to execute Huang Hao because Huang Hao had strong influence in the Shu government, so he quickly excused himself and left. Liu Shan later instructed Huang Hao to visit Jiang Wei and apologise to him. Jiang Wei also managed to convince Huang Hao to let him remain in Tazhong to oversee agricultural production. His true intention, however, was to avoid getting caught up in a power struggle with Huang Hao in Chengdu.

== Fall of Shu ==
=== Jiang Wei's early warnings ===
In 263, Jiang Wei wrote a memorial to Liu Shan as follows:

"I heard that Zhong Hui has been mobilising troops in Guanzhong and appears to be preparing to launch an invasion. As a precautionary measure, I think we should send Zhang Yi and Liao Hua to lead our forces to guard Yang'an Pass and the bridge at Yinping."

Huang Hao believed fortune-tellers' prediction that Wei would not invade Shu, so he advised Liu Shan to ignore Jiang Wei's memorial and not put it up for discussion in the imperial court.

=== From Tazhong to Yinping ===
Around August or September 263, the Wei regent Sima Zhao ordered Zhong Hui, Deng Ai and Zhuge Xu to lead Wei forces to invade Shu from three different directions. When Zhong Hui reached Luo Valley (駱谷; southwest of present-day Zhouzhi County, Shaanxi) and Deng Ai attacked Tazhong (沓中; northwest of present-day Zhugqu County, Gansu), the Shu government ordered Liao Hua to lead reinforcements to support Jiang Wei at Tazhong. At the same time, they also sent Zhang Yi, Dong Jue and other Shu officers to lead troops to guard Yang'an Pass (陽安關; in present-day Ningqiang County, Shaanxi) and assist the Shu forces on the external perimeter.

When the Shu reinforcements reached Yinping (陰平; present-day Wen County, Gansu), they heard that Zhuge Xu was attacking Jianwei (建威; northeast of present-day Wudu District, Longnan, Gansu), so they stopped in their tracks at Yinping. After about a month, Deng Ai defeated Jiang Wei and occupied Tazhong, so Jiang Wei retreated to Yinping.

At the same time, Zhong Hui besieged Hancheng (漢城; present-day Mian County, Shaanxi) and Lecheng (樂城; present-day Chenggu County, Shaanxi) counties, and sent his subordinates to attack Yang'an Pass. The Shu officer Jiang Shu (蔣舒) opened up the pass and surrendered to the enemy, while his colleague Fu Qian died trying to defend the pass. After failing to take Lecheng County, Zhong Hui gave up and advanced towards Yang'an Pass when he learnt that his subordinates had captured the pass.

=== Defence of Jiange ===
By the time Zhang Yi and Dong Jue reached Hanshou County (漢壽縣; northeast of present-day Jiange County, Sichuan), Jiang Wei and Liao Hua had decided to abandon their position at Yinping and rendezvous with Zhang Yi and Dong Jue at the mountain pass Jiange, where they resisted attacks by Zhong Hui.

At one point, Zhong Hui wrote to Jiang Wei: "Sir, you are skilled in both civil and military affairs. You are exceptionally brilliant in strategy and your achievements are well-known throughout the Bashu region and the rest of the Empire. People from near and afar admire you. Every time I reflect on history, I hope that we can serve the same dynasty. Our relationship is like the friendship between Jizha and Zichan."

Jiang Wei did not reply and ordered his troops to strengthen their defenses at Jiange. After failing to breach the mountain pass and with his army's food supplies running low, Zhong Hui considered pulling back all his troops and retreating.

=== Shu surrender ===
In the meantime, Deng Ai and his troops took a shortcut from Yinping through mountainous terrain and showed up at Mianzhu, where they defeated the Shu defenders led by Zhuge Zhan. After taking Mianzhu, Deng Ai advanced further and approached Chengdu, the Shu capital. In late November or December 263, Liu Shan decided to surrender to Deng Ai, thus bringing an end to the existence of Shu.

When Jiang Wei first heard that Mianzhu had fallen, he also received confusing information about the situation in Chengdu. Some said that Liu Shan wanted to remain in Chengdu and defend the city, while others claimed that the Shu emperor was going to abandon Chengdu and flee south to Jianning Commandery (建寧郡; covering parts of present-day Yunnan and Guizhou). Jiang Wei thus prepared to abandon Jiange and lead his troops to Qi County (郪縣; present-day Santai County, Sichuan), which was nearer to Chengdu, to verify the truth.

Just then, Jiang Wei and his troops received orders from Chengdu to lay down their arms and surrender to Zhong Hui at Fu County (涪縣; present-day Mianyang, Sichuan). Many Shu soldiers felt so shocked and angry when they heard of their emperor's surrender that they drew their swords and slashed at rocks to vent their frustration. When Zhong Hui finally met Jiang Wei, he asked him: "Why are you late?" With a solemn expression on his face and tears streaming down his cheeks, Jiang Wei replied: "Our meeting today came too early." Zhong Hui was impressed by Jiang Wei's response.

== Attempt to restore Shu ==
=== Instigating Zhong Hui to rebel against Wei ===
Zhong Hui treated Jiang Wei well and returned him his tallies and other insignia. They travelled in the same carriage and sat at the same table during meals. Zhong Hui also told his chief clerk Du Yu: "Famous people from the Central Plains like Gongxiu and Taichu can't be compared to Boyue."

Jiang Wei sensed that Zhong Hui had the intention of rebelling against Wei and sought to exploit this opportunity to stage an uprising and restore Shu. He told Zhong Hui:

"I heard that you have been very detailed and comprehensive in your planning since you got involved in Huainan. You have never miscalculated before. It was because of your help that Sima Zhao became the Duke of Jin and gained control over the Wei government. Now that you have vanquished Shu, your fame spreads throughout the Empire and the people sing praises of you. Wouldn't Sima Zhao feel worried that your glory will outshine his? Are you willing to live in seclusion for the rest of your life to avoid bringing disaster upon yourself? In the past, Han Xin didn't betray the Han dynasty but the emperor still doubted his loyalty. Wen Zhong didn't heed Fan Li's advice to retire and ended up being forced to commit suicide. Were they muddleheaded rulers and foolish subjects? They weren't. They were forced to do what they had to because of power politics. Now that you have made a great achievement and earned everlasting fame, why don't you follow in the footsteps of Fan Li and go into retirement to save yourself? You can then tour the peak of Mount Emei or travel around the world like Chisongzi."

Zhong Hui replied: "What you just said is so far-off. I can't do this. Besides, given my current situation, there isn't a need for me to do this."

Jiang Wei then said:

"I only suggested that you go into retirement. I am sure that given your intelligence, you can think of other options and carry them out. You don't need an old man like me to get longwinded on this."

They became even closer friends after this.

=== Death ===
Zhong Hui then framed his fellow Wei general Deng Ai for plotting a rebellion and had him arrested and sent back to the Wei capital Luoyang as a prisoner. (Note: See Deng Ai#Zhong Hui's role in Deng Ai's arrest and Zhong Hui#Arresting Deng Ai for details.) With Deng Ai gone, Zhong Hui had control over Chengdu and the former Shu territories. In March 264, he started a revolt against the Wei regent Sima Zhao and declared himself the Governor of Yi Province (益州牧).

Zhong Hui wanted to put Jiang Wei in command of 50,000 troops and let him lead the vanguard force to attack Luoyang. However, around noon on 3 March 264, some Wei officers who were unwilling to participate in the rebellion started a mutiny against Zhong Hui. At the time, Jiang Wei was collecting his armour and weapons from Zhong Hui when they heard shouting and received news that a fire had broken out. Moments later, it was reported that many soldiers were crowding near the city gates. Zhong Hui was surprised and he asked Jiang Wei: "Those men are causing trouble. What should we do?" Jiang Wei replied: "Kill them."

Zhong Hui then ordered his men to kill the officers who refused to participate in the rebellion. A while later, there were reports of people climbing up the city gates on ladders and of people setting fire to buildings. Chaos broke out and arrows were fired in all directions. The mutinying officers regrouped with their men and attacked Zhong Hui and Jiang Wei. Zhong Hui and Jiang Wei fought the mutinying soldiers and slew about five or six of them, but were eventually overwhelmed and killed. The soldiers also killed Jiang Wei's wife and child(ren). The Wei Jin Shiyu (魏晋世語) recorded that the soldiers sliced open Jiang Wei's body when they killed him and saw that his gallbladder was one dou in size. (Note: In his Zizhi Tongjian Kaoyi, Sima Guang opinioned that the human body could not hold a gallbladder that was one dou in size; he thought that the unit of measurement should be sheng instead. In Kaoyi, Sima also listed alternative accounts of Zhong Hui's rebellion found in Wei Guan's biography in Book of Jin, and Chang Qu's Chronicles of Huayang, but noted that he used the accounts found in Sanguozhi when recording Zhong Hui's rebellion in Tongjian.)

=== Alternative account from the Chronicles of Huayang ===
The Chronicles of Huayang recorded that Jiang Wei was only pretending to cooperate with Zhong Hui. He first instigated Zhong Hui to execute the Wei officers who were unwilling to join the rebellion, and then sought to find an opportunity to assassinate Zhong Hui. He would then lead the Shu people to kill all the Wei soldiers and restore their state. He also wrote a secret letter to Liu Shan as follows:

"I hope that Your Majesty can temporarily endure humiliation over the next few days. I am planning to overturn the situation and restore our state in the same way the Sun and Moon transition from darkness to brightness."

== Family and descendants ==
Jiang Wei's father, Jiang Jiong (姜冏), served as a military officer in Tianshui Commandery and lost his life while suppressing a rebellion by the Qiang and other non-Han Chinese tribes.

Although Jiang Wei's biography in the Sanguozhi records that he lost contact with his mother after defecting to Shu, the Zaji (雜記) states that he later received a letter from her asking him to return home. He wrote a reply as follows:

"One mu of land is nothing compared to a hundred qing of fertile farmland. When one's ambition lies far away, he will not want to return home."

The Tang dynasty general Jiang Baoyi (姜寶誼) and chancellor Jiang Ke (姜恪) were descendants of Jiang Wei according to the table of chancellors' family trees in the New Book of Tang.

== Appraisal ==
In his modern Chinese edition of the 11th-century historical text Zizhi Tongjian, the Taiwan-based Chinese historian Bo Yang mentioned that Jiang Wei was a highly controversial figure in Chinese history. He cited seven writers (Xi Zheng, Sun Sheng, Chen Shou, He Zhuo, Gan Bao, Wang Mingsheng and Pei Songzhi) who held different and discordant views of Jiang Wei.

Bo Yang himself, however, declined to comment but later shared in an open letter to a reader that he agreed with all seven views: Jiang Wei committed a fatal error in draining Shu's resources but he was also a loyal general who was willing to sacrifice himself in a futile attempt to restore Shu.

=== Zhuge Liang's views ===
Zhuge Liang once told Zhang Yi and Jiang Wan:

"Jiang Boyue is loyal and diligent in performing his duties. He is very thorough and detailed in his thinking. After assessing his strengths and character, I think Yongnan, Jichang and the others are not as good as him. He is truly a great talent from Liang Province."

On another occasion, Zhuge Liang said:

"I should put him in command of 5,000 to 6,000 troops. Jiang Boyue is well-versed in military affairs. He not only demonstrates courage and righteousness, but also shows a deep understanding of warfare. This man is loyal to the Han dynasty and he is exceptionally talented. I should entrust him with greater authority in the military. I will send him to the imperial palace to meet the Emperor."

=== Xi Zheng's views ===
Xi Zheng, a scholar from Shu who later served as an official under the Jin dynasty, commented on Jiang Wei as follows:

"Jiang Boyue held the responsibilities of a top general and occupied a high position in the government, yet he lived in a plain-looking residence, had no other income besides his salary, had only one wife and no concubines, and had no form of entertainment. His clothes and transport were just sufficient for use; he also imposed restrictions on his meals. He was neither extravagant nor shabby. He kept his spending within the limits of his state-issued allowance. His purpose in doing so was neither to prove that he was incorruptible nor to resist temptation. He did so ungrudgingly because he felt satisfied with what he already had. Mediocre people tend to praise those who achieve success and condemn those who fail; they praise those of higher status than them, and condemn those of lower status than them. Many people hold negative views of Jiang Wei because he died in a terrible way and his entire family was killed. These people do not look beyond the superficial. They fail to grasp the true meaning of appraisal as set out in the Spring and Autumn Annals. Jiang Wei's studiousness, as well as his modesty and humility, make him a role model for his contemporaries."

=== Sun Sheng's views ===
The Jin dynasty historian Sun Sheng responded to Xi Zheng's comments on Jiang Wei as follows:

"I disagree with Xi Zheng's view. Although scholar-officials may take different paths and have different goals, they should live by the four fundamental values of loyalty, filial piety, righteousness and integrity. Jiang Wei was originally from Wei yet he defected to Shu and betrayed his ruler for personal gain. Therefore, he was disloyal. He abandoned his family to lead a meaningless life. Therefore, he was unfilial. He also turned against his native state. Therefore, he was unrighteous. He lost battles but chose to live on. Therefore, he had no integrity. When he was in power, he failed to establish himself as a virtuous leader and instead brought untold suffering to the people by forcing them into a prolonged war to boost his personal glory. Although he was responsible for defending his state, he ended up provoking the enemy and lost his state. Therefore, he was neither wise nor courageous. Jiang Wei possessed not a single one of these six values. In reality, Jiang Wei was nothing more than a traitor to Wei and an incompetent head of government to Shu, yet Xi Zheng said he was worthy of serving as a role model. How absurd is that. Even though Jiang Wei may be studious, that is just a good habit rather than a praiseworthy virtue. That is no different from a robber taking his due share of the loot, and no different from Cheng Zheng pretending to be humble. (Note: According to the Zuo Zhuan, Cheng Zheng was a favorite official of Duke Ping of Jin. When an official of Zheng, Gongsun Hui, visited Jin on a goodwill trip in 549 BC, Cheng asked Gongsun, "How may I demote myself?" Gongsun could not answer the question. After his return to Zheng, Gongsun told Ran Ming about Cheng's question. Ran Ming told Gongsun, "This man is either dying or about to go into exile. If one becomes fearful due to his high position, and wishes to demote himself, he will naturally be able to attain a lower position which suits him. This lower position merely places him below others; what is there to ask about? Also, one who asks for demotion after attaining a high position is a wise man, and not someone like Cheng Zheng. I'm afraid he has exhibited signs of going into exile. Otherwise, he's become worried as he's about to die." After Cheng Zheng died the following year, Zichan was so impressed with Ran Ming that he asked Ran Ming how to govern a state.)"

In his Jin Yang Qiu (晉陽秋), Sun Sheng also wrote:

"During the early Yonghe era (of the reign of Emperor Mu of Jin), when I accompanied General Huan Wen (Note: referred to by his then-title of "General Who Brings Tranquility to the West") on the campaign to subdue the Cheng-Han state, I spoke to many Shu locals about Jiang Wei. They told me: 'After Jiang Wei surrendered, he wrote a secret letter to Liu Shan saying that he was going to pretend to serve under Zhong Hui and wait for an opportunity to assassinate him and restore Shu. However, due to unforeseen circumstances, his plan failed and he lost his life. The people still mourn him today.' I have a different view. The ancients said: 'If one puts himself through difficulty when he shouldn't, his reputation will suffer. When one takes possession of things he shouldn't, his life will be in danger. When one's reputation suffers and his life is in danger, it won't be long before he meets his end.' This is a very befitting description of Jiang Wei. When Deng Ai entered Jiangyou, he had very few troops with him, yet Jiang Wei could neither stop him at Mianzhu nor lead the five Shu generals to protect their emperor. In order to implement their plan for the future, they alternated between good and bad timings, and hoped for success when their chances were so low. Given that his state was already so weak, he still constantly waged war in Guanzhong. After his state fell, he still hoped to exploit an opportunity that depended on external circumstances. How foolish he was!"

=== Chen Shou's views ===
Chen Shou, the Western Jin historian who wrote Jiang Wei's biography in the Sanguozhi, appraised Jiang Wei as follows:

"Jiang Wei was proficient in civil and military affairs, and he desired to attain personal glory and leave his name in history. However, he lacked foresight and good judgment when he chose a path of warmongering, and that resulted in his downfall. As Laozi once said, 'governing a state is like cooking a small dish.' Shu was a small state, so all the more he should not have continuously disturbed it."

=== He Zhuo's views ===
The Qing dynasty writer He Zhuo (何焯) wrote:

"A state cannot function if it lacks any of these institutions: a palace, a government, a judiciary and a military. Jiang Wei was isolated and Liu Shan was an incompetent ruler. Shu's foundation was already shaky and its government and judiciary were not functioning as well as they did in the past. In Zhuge Liang's time, the people found it easier to get over the fact that their state lost a battle; it was no longer the same when it came to Jiang Wei's time. Besides, the defeat at Shanggui was much worse than the defeat at Jieting. Jiang Wei only saw how fast his predecessor recovered from defeats, and failed to realise that he did not have a capable deputy like Fei Yi to take charge of internal affairs. That was why he never made it as far as Zhuge Liang. It was a huge pity for a person with great ambition like him."

=== Gan Bao's views ===
The Jin dynasty historian Gan Bao wrote:

"Jiang Wei was the head of government in Shu. It was a pity that he died during Zhong Hui's rebellion instead of dying when his state was conquered and his ruler suffered humiliation. It is not difficult to die, but it is difficult to choose how to die. When martyrs of ancient times abandoned the missions they received in times of crisis and fled, it was not because they feared death but because they knew they could not live forever and did not want to sacrifice their lives for nothing."

=== Wang Mingsheng's views ===
The Qing dynasty historian Wang Mingsheng (王鳴盛) wrote:

"Jiang Wei's goal was to restore the state of Shu but he failed and died in his attempt. It feels as if his noble heart is still beating today. Although Chen Shou was a former Shu subject, he was serving under the Jin dynasty (when he wrote the Sanguozhi) so he had to choose his words carefully. When he wrote about a major historical figure like Jiang Wei, he decided to censor any favourable opinion of Jiang Wei, and criticise Jiang Wei for seeking his own doom with his warmongering behaviour. How could Chen Shou not know that it was a better choice for Shu to go to war with Wei instead of waiting to be conquered by Wei? However, he could not voice this out given his status as a subject of the Jin dynasty. Even if Chen Shou agreed that Jiang Wei was wrong to have considered assassinating Zhong Hui, he would have to keep such an opinion to himself. Chen Shou thus wrote a negative appraisal of Jiang Wei in order to save himself from getting into trouble because of his writings. Jiang Wei was significant to Shu in the same way Zhang Shijie and Lu Xiufu were significant to the Southern Song dynasty.

=== Pei Songzhi's views ===
The Liu Song dynasty historian Pei Songzhi, who annotated the Sanguozhi, commented on Jiang Wei as follows:

"When Zhong Hui and his massive army attacked Jiange, Jiang Wei and his officers led their troops to put up a solid defence. When Zhong Hui wanted to retreat after failing to breach Jiange, Jiang Wei nearly gained the glory of successfully defending Shu from an invasion. However, Deng Ai took a shortcut, bypassed Jiang Wei, defeated Zhuge Zhan and conquered Chengdu. If Jiang Wei turned back to save Chengdu, Zhong Hui would attack him from the rear. Under such circumstances, how could he possibly achieve both goals? People who criticise Jiang Wei for not turning back to retake Mianzhu and save the emperor are being unreasonable. Zhong Hui later planned to execute all the Wei officers who opposed his rebellion and put Jiang Wei in command of a 50,000-strong vanguard force. If everything went according to plan, all the Wei officers would have been executed and Jiang Wei could have seized military power and killed Zhong Hui, and thus it would not have been too difficult for him to restore Shu. When great people made remarkable achievements while others least expected it, they receive praise for creating miracles. When unforeseen circumstances ruin a plan, it does not mean that the plan was a bad one to begin with. If an unforeseeable condition caused Tian Dan's "fire cattle columns" tactic to fail, would people say that he was foolish?"

Pei Songzhi also rebutted Sun Sheng's response to Xi Zheng's comments on Jiang Wei:

"I think that Xi Zheng only said that Jiang Wei's studiousness, modesty and humility are praiseworthy; he did not say that we should emulate Jiang Wei's career path and live by the same standards as him. When Xi Zheng said Jiang Wei was 'a good role model for his contemporaries', he was referring only to Jiang Wei's studiousness, modesty and humility. Jiang Wei's original biography and the Weilüe both recorded that he had no intention of betraying Wei and it was the circumstances that forced him to defect to Shu. Out of Sun Sheng's many criticisms of Jiang Wei, only the one that says Jiang Wei was unfilial is valid. The other criticisms are not only too extreme, but also not directly relevant to what Xi Zheng said."

=== Chang Qu's views ===
Chang Qu, who wrote extensively about the history of the Sichuan region in the Chronicles of Huayang (Huayang Guo Zhi), commented on Jiang Wei as follows:

"Jiang Wei's ability did not match Zhuge Liang yet he wanted to carry on his legacy. The people blamed him for their toil therefore family and country were ended."

=== Miscellaneous ===
The Wei Jin Shiyu (魏晉世語) recorded that Jiang Wei had no equal among the talented persons serving in the Shu government during his time.

== In Romance of the Three Kingdoms ==
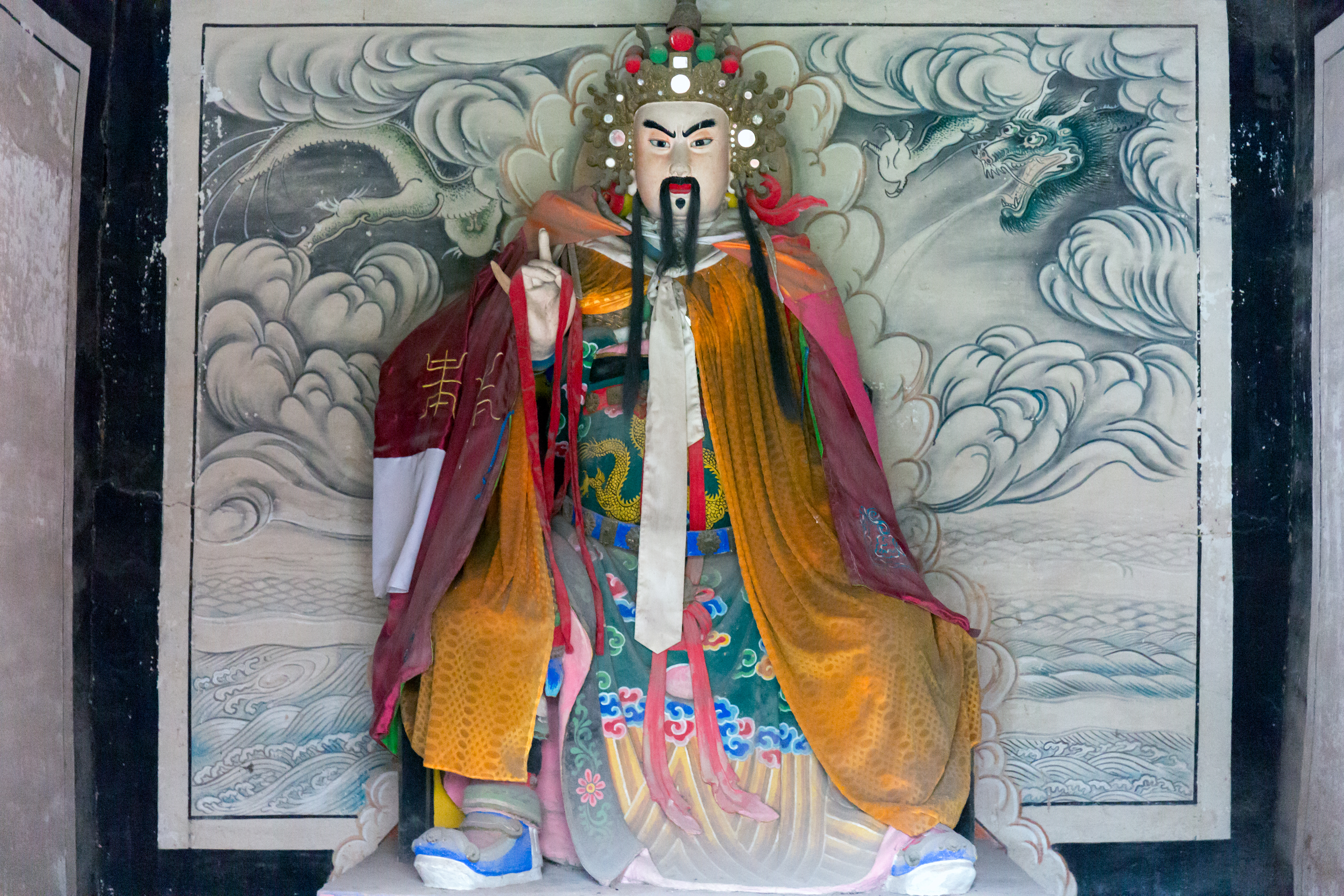
Jiang Wei 2016 Temple of Marquis Wu (Wuzhang Plains)

Jiang Wei is a major character in the later chapters of the 14th-century historical novel Romance of the Three Kingdoms, which romanticises the historical events and figures of the late Eastern Han dynasty and Three Kingdoms period of China. In the novel, he is depicted as Zhuge Liang's protégé and successor who inherits the legacy of leading Shu into war against Wei with the aim of restoring the fallen Eastern Han dynasty.

Jiang Wei first appears in Chapters 92 and 93 as a Wei military officer serving in Tianshui Commandery during Zhuge Liang's first Northern Expedition. When Zhuge Liang tries to trick Ma Zun, the Administrator of Tianshui, to lead his troops out of Tianshui to save the Wei general Xiahou Mao in Nan'an Commandery, Jiang Wei sees through Zhuge Liang's ruse and advises Ma Zun to remain in Tianshui and set a trap for the enemy. When the Shu general Zhao Yun shows up to take Tianshui, he falls into the trap and briefly duels with Jiang Wei before Shu reinforcements arrive and save him. Zhao Yun tells Zhuge Liang that he is impressed that Tianshui has such a talent like Jiang Wei. When Jiang Wei successfully repels another Shu attack, Zhuge Liang is even more impressed and eager to recruit Jiang Wei to serve in Shu. He tricks Ma Zun into believing that Jiang Wei has defected to Shu in order to prevent Jiang Wei from going back to Wei, and then springs a trap for Jiang Wei. When Jiang Wei gets cornered, he attempts suicide but Zhuge Liang stops him and manages to convince him to surrender and join Shu.

Jiang Wei accompanies Zhuge Liang on his subsequent Northern Expeditions. Chapters 107 to 115 dramatise Jiang Wei's Northern Expeditions and refer to them as Jiang Wei's "Nine Campaigns on the Central Plains" when historically there were actually eleven campaigns instead of nine. In Chapter 119, Jiang Wei instigates Zhong Hui to launch a rebellion against Wei, but their rebellion fails when some of Zhong Hui's officers start a mutiny against their superior. Cornered by the enemy, Jiang Wei sighs, "It is Heaven's will that my plan doesn't succeed!" He then commits suicide by slitting his throat.

A verse from the novel in Jiang Wei's honour reads:

天水誇英俊，涼州產異才。Tianshui boasts of heroes; Liang Province produces rare talents.
系從尚父出，術奉武侯來。He descends from Shangfu; he inherits his skills from Marquis Wu.
大膽應無懼，雄心誓不回。Courageous and fearless; stouthearted and self-sacrificing.
成都身死日，漢將有餘哀。The day he dies in Chengdu; a Han general still has sorrows.

== In popular culture ==
Jiang Wei appears as a playable character in the video game series Dynasty Warriors and Warriors Orochi produced by Koei Tecmo. In the games, he is portrayed as a young warrior fiercely devoted to his mentor Zhuge Liang. He also appears in Koei Tecmo's Romance of the Three Kingdoms series.

== Memorials and relics ==
A Jiang Wei Memorial Museum (姜維紀念館) was constructed in 1999 near Jiang Wei's hometown in the east of Gangu County, Tianshui, Gansu. The museum, covering an area of 360 square metres, was funded by the locals. Among other things, it contains a four-metre-tall statue of Jiang Wei in the main hall, as well as a stone tablet inscribed with the words "Jiang Wei's hometown" in calligraphy by the general Yang Chengwu.

The Pingxiang Tower (平襄楼) in present-day Lushan County, Sichuan is a 24-metre-tall building commemorating Jiang Wei. Its name comes from Jiang Wei's peerage, the Marquis of Pingxiang (平襄侯). The tower was built during the Song dynasty, renovated in 1445 during the Ming dynasty, and designated as a Major Historical and Cultural Site Protected at the National Level by China's State Administration of Cultural Heritage in 2006.

There are a number of relics related to Jiang Wei at Jianmen Pass in present-day Jiange County, Sichuan, including a Jiang Wei Well (姜維井), Jiang Wei Cave (姜維洞), Jiang Wei Fortress (姜維城), Jiang Wei Temple (姜維廟), Lord Jiang Bridge (姜公橋), Jiang Wei Armoury (姜維軍械) and Jiang Wei Tomb (姜維墓). Poets such as Lu You, Zuo Mu (左牧), Li Tiaoyuan (李調元) and Zhuang Xuehe (莊學和) have written poems at Jianmen Pass to praise Jiang Wei.

The Chinese Type 053H2G class and Type 053H3 class of frigates have the NATO code names Jiangwei I class and Jiangwei II class respectively. Whether this is a coincidence or in memorial of Jiang Wei is unknown.

== See also ==
- Lists of people of the Three Kingdoms
