= Deng Ai =

Cao Wei state general and official (197–264)

- 鄧艾
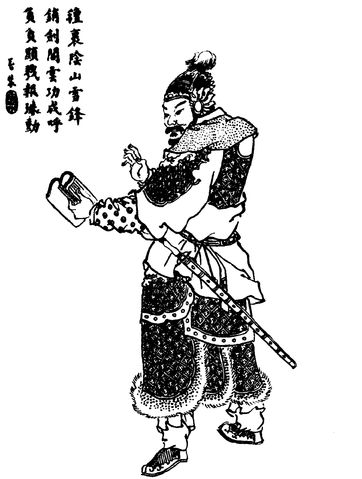
- A Qing dynasty illustration of Deng Ai

Grand Commandant (太尉)
- In office 8 February 264 – March 264
- Monarch: Cao Huan
- Preceded by: Gao Rou
- Succeeded by: Wang Xiang

General Who Attacks the West (征西將軍)
- In office 257 – 8 February 264
- Monarchs: Cao Mao; Cao Huan

General Who Guards the West (鎮西將軍)
- In office 256 – 257
- Monarch: Cao Mao

General Who Stabilises the West (安西將軍)
- In office 9 October 255 – 256
- Monarch: Cao Mao

Personal details
- Born: c.197 (Note: Deng Ai's year of birth is not clearly recorded in the Sanguozhi. However, his biography in the Sanguozhi recorded that he was 12 years old (by East Asian age reckoning) around the time when Cao Cao conquered Jing Province in 208. If we assume that Deng Ai was 11 in 208, by calculation, his year of birth should be 197. Chen Shou recorded in Deng's biography in Sanguozhi that Jin official Duan Zhuo wrote in a petition to Emperor Wu that Deng was nearing 70 at the time of his death.) Xinye County, Henan
- Died: March 264 (aged 66) (Note: The Zizhi Tongjian makes it clear that Deng Ai died in 264. However, his birth year is not incontrovertibly accepted to be 197. Therefore, 66, the age at which he died, would only make sense if we assume his birth year to be 197.) Mianzhu, Sichuan
- Children: Deng Zhong; at least one other son
- Occupation: General, politician
- Courtesy name: Shizai (士載)
- Peerage: Marquis of Deng (鄧侯)

Deng Ai (c.197 – late March 264), courtesy name Shizai, was a Chinese military general and politician of the state of Wei during the Three Kingdoms period of China. He is best known for his pivotal role in the Wei conquest of its rival state, Shu, in late 263. He was described as a very loyal subject who made great contributions to Wei, but was also noted for his arrogance and audacity, which led to his downfall and death.

Born in a peasant family, Deng Ai started his career as a minor agricultural officer. Sometime between 235 and 239, he met Sima Yi, who recognised his talent and gave him a higher position in the civil service. Around this time, he also wrote a proposal on starting agricultural works in the Huai River region, and received credit for his ideas. Deng Ai gained greater prominence in Wei from 249 onwards after he joined the Wei general Guo Huai in stopping a Shu invasion. He also advised the regent Sima Shi on some issues. In 255, he participated in the suppression of a rebellion started by the generals Guanqiu Jian and Wen Qin, and was promoted to the status of a top general. From 255 to 262, he defended Wei's western borders in present-day Gansu from multiple incursions by the Shu forces led by the general Jiang Wei.

Deng Ai reached the pinnacle of his career in 263, when he led Wei forces to conquer Shu. By leading a strike force through a shortcut across dangerous mountainous terrain, Deng Ai showed up in the vicinity of the Shu capital, Chengdu, and took the enemy by surprise. After a failed attempt by the Shu general Zhuge Zhan to stop Deng Ai at Mianzhu, the Shu emperor Liu Shan voluntarily surrendered to Deng Ai and brought an end to the Shu state. Following his success in the Shu campaign, Deng Ai became arrogant about his achievements and showed disregard for the Wei government's authority. The Wei general Zhong Hui exploited and manipulated Deng Ai's arrogance to great effect. In 264, Deng Ai was arrested by Wei Guan and Zhong Hui, who were acting under order by the Wei regent Sima Zhao. He was placed in a prison cart and escorted to the capital Luoyang, but was killed en route by soldiers sent by Wei Guan. His sons were executed as well. His surviving family members were exiled but allowed to return in 266 after the Jin dynasty was established.

== Early life and career ==
Deng Ai was from Jiyang County (棘陽縣), Yiyang Commandery (義陽郡), which is around present-day Xinye County, Henan. He was born towards the end of the Eastern Han dynasty and lost his father at a young age. When the warlord Cao Cao conquered northern Jing Province in 208, Deng Ai moved to Runan Commandery (汝南郡; in present-day southern Henan), where he lived as a farmer and raised cattle. When he was 11 years old, he and his mother passed by Chen Shi's tomb in Yingchuan Commandery (潁川郡; around present-day Xuchang, Henan). He read two lines engraved on Chen Shi's tombstone: "his writings became examples of excellent prose; his conduct served as a role model for scholar-officials" (文為世範，行為士則). He was so inspired that he wanted to change his given name to Fan (literally "(role) model") and his courtesy name to Shize (literally "for scholar-officials to emulate"). However, since the names Fan and Shize were already used by members of his extended family, he could not change his names as such because it would violate the naming taboo.

Deng Ai later became an academician (學士) under the Commandant of Xiangcheng (襄城; present-day Xiangcheng County, Henan). However, he was not too successful in his career because he stuttered in his speech. He then switched his job to an agricultural officer in charge of grain and fodder. The locals pitied him for his poor family background and often provided him with financial aid. Deng Ai initially did not show any form of gratitude towards them. Whenever he saw mountains and lakes, he started gesturing and pointing out how and where he believed army camps should be laid out, but was scorned by others. Later on, he was promoted to a clerical position which put him in charge of maintaining records of agricultural output. (Note: (為都尉學士，以口吃，不得作幹佐。為稻田守叢草吏。同郡吏父怜其家貧，資給甚厚，艾初不稱謝。每見高山大澤，輙規度指畫軍營處所，時人多笑焉。後將典農綱紀，上計吏， ...) Sanguozhi vol. 28.)

Deng Ai had an acquaintance, Shi Bao (石苞; father of Shi Chong), who was about the same age as him. They were quite close to Guo Xuanxin (郭玄信), who served as an Internuncio (謁者). When Ji Ben, an imperial physician, started a rebellion in Xu (許; present-day Xuchang, Henan) in 218, Guo Xuanxin was implicated and initially placed under house arrest until an officer came to escort him to the imperial capital for trial. Deng Ai and Shi Bao were among the escorts. While travelling for about ten li, Guo Xuanxin chatted with them along the way and remarked that the two of them would become very capable officials in the future. Deng Ai was later promoted to the rank of an Agricultural Officer of Merit (典農功曹). (Note: (世語曰：鄧艾少為襄城典農部民，與石苞皆年十二三。謁者陽翟郭玄信，武帝監軍郭誕元弈之子。建安中，少府吉本起兵許都，玄信坐被刑在家，從典農司馬求入御，以艾、苞與御，行十餘里，與語，恱之，謂二人皆當遠至為佐相。艾後為典農功曹，奉使詣宣王，由此見知，遂被拔擢。) Shiyu annotation in Sanguozhi vol. 28. This anecdote was also recorded in Shi Bao's biography in Book of Jin, albeit in lesser detail. (县召为吏，给农司马。会谒者阳翟郭玄信奉使，求人为御，司马以苞及邓艾给之。行十馀里，玄信谓二人曰：“子後并当至卿相。”苞曰：“御隶也，何卿相乎？”) Jin Shu, vol.33)

Sometime between 235 and 239, (Note: Vols. 73–74 of the Zizhi Tongjian recorded that Sima Yi was appointed as Grand Commandant (太尉) in 235 and he held office until his replacement by Man Chong in 239. Therefore, the time when Deng Ai first met Sima Yi should probably be in between 235–239.) he was sent as a messenger to the capital, Luoyang, where, by chance, he met Sima Yi, who was then serving as the Grand Commandant (太尉) under the Wei government. Sima Yi felt that Deng Ai was an extraordinary person so he recruited him and promoted him to the position of a Gentleman of Writing (尚書郎). (Note: (... 因使見太尉司馬宣王。宣王奇之，辟之為掾，遷尚書郎。) Sanguozhi vol. 28.)

== Agricultural and irrigation projects ==
Around the time, the Wei state was planning to promote agriculture and stockpile food resources in preparation for military campaigns against its rival states, Shu and Wu. Deng Ai was sent to survey the lands from the east of Chen (陳) and Xiang (項) commanderies (around present-day Zhoukou, Henan) to Shouchun (壽春; around present-day Shou County, Anhui), and assess their suitability for agriculture. He saw that the lands were fertile but lacked moisture, so they were not fully utilised. He suggested digging irrigation channels to irrigate the land, and open up new canals for transporting goods by water. (Note: (時欲廣田畜糓，為滅賊資，使艾行陳、項已東至壽春。艾以為「田良水少，不足以盡地利，宜開河渠，可以引水澆溉，大積軍糧，又通運漕之道。」) Sanguozhi vol. 28.)

Deng Ai wrote a proposal, the Ji He Lun (濟河論; Discussion on the River), to explain his ideas: (Note: (乃著濟河論以喻其指。) Sanguozhi vol. 28.)

"In the past, when the Yellow Turban Rebellion broke out, Emperor Ling established the tuntian system for farm maintenance. Xuchang has an abundant number of food supplies. Although most of the Empire has already been pacified, the lands along and south of the Huai River are frequently subjected to the ravages of war. Every time we launch a southern campaign, around half of our manpower is used for transporting supplies. The lands that divide Chen and Cai commanderies are extremely fertile, so we can reduce the number of grain fields around Xuchang and divert the flow of the Huai River eastward, toward Chen and Cai commanderies. At this moment, 20,000 soldiers are stationed north of the Huai River, with another 30,000 stationed to the south, and another 40,000 actively guarding our territories and farming at the same time. In favorable weather, the harvest can reach three times the amount in the western reaches! After civilian and military deductions, we have around 5 million hu of grain at the ready for military use. Within six or 7 years, we can attain 30 million hu of grain along the upper banks of the Huai River, enough to feed over 100,000 people for 15 years. With such abundant food supplies, we can easily conquer Eastern Wu and seize victory!" (Note: (又以為「昔破黃巾，因為屯田，積穀於許都以制四方。今三隅已定，事在淮南，每大軍征舉，運兵過半，功費巨億，以為大役。陳、蔡之間，土下田良，可省許昌左右諸稻田，并水東下。令淮北屯二萬人，淮南三萬人，十二分休，常有四萬人，且田且守。水豐常收三倍於西，計除衆費，歲完五百萬斛以為軍資。六七年間，可積三千萬斛於淮上，此則十萬之衆五年食也。以此乘吳，無往而不克矣。」) Sanguozhi vol. 28.)

Sima Yi agreed with Deng Ai's proposal and implemented his ideas. (Note: (宣王善之，事皆施行。) Sanguozhi vol. 28.)

In 241, the agricultural projects were complete. Whenever there were battles in the southeast between Wei and Wu, the Wei forces could sail down the river towards the Huai River region to counter the enemy. This was because they had plenty of food supplies stockpiled upstream and had the water pathways to their advantage. Deng Ai received credit for his proposal. (Note: (正始二年，乃開廣漕渠，每東南有事，大軍興衆，汎舟而下，達于江、淮，資食有儲而無水害，艾所建也。) Sanguozhi vol. 28.)

== Battle of Tao River ==
Deng Ai later became a military adviser to the Wei general Xiahou Xuan and served as the Administrator of Nan'an Commandery (南安郡; around present-day Longxi and Wushan counties, Gansu). In 249, he followed Xiahou Xuan's successor Guo Huai to resist an invasion led by the Shu general Jiang Wei. After the Shu forces were repelled, Guo Huai advanced west to attack the Qiang tribes. Deng Ai cautioned him: "The enemy did not retreat far. They might turn back to attack us again, so we should split up our forces in case they attack us again." (Note: (出參征西軍事，遷南安太守。嘉平元年，與征西將軍郭淮拒蜀偏將軍姜維。維退，淮因西擊羌。艾曰：「賊去未遠，或能復還，宜分諸軍以備不虞。」) Sanguozhi vol. 28.)

Guo Huai then ordered Chen Tai, Xu Zhi and Deng Ai to lead Wei forces to attack the fortresses at Qushan and cut off their food and water supplies. Ju An and Li Xin led their men to taunt Deng Ai to attack them, but Deng Ai ignored them. As time passed, the two fortresses gradually ran out of supplies. Jiang Wei led his troops from Mount Niutou (牛頭山; west of present-day Zhaohua District, Guangyuan, Sichuan) to reinforce the fortresses. They encountered Chen Tai and his troops along the way. Chen Tai said: "The Art of War says that the best way to win a battle is to win without fighting. If we manage to occupy Mount Niutou, Jiang Wei's return route will be sealed off and he can be easily captured by us." He then ordered his troops to build forts to resist Jiang Wei's forces but refrain from engaging the enemy. At the same time, he also wrote to Guo Huai and requested his help in attacking Mount Niutou. Guo Huai did so and led his troops across the Tao River in preparation for attacking Mount Niutou. (Note: (淮從泰計，使泰率討蜀護軍徐質、南安太守鄧艾等進兵圍之，斷其運道及城外流水。安等挑戰，不許，將士困窘，分糧聚雪以稽日月。維果來救，出自牛頭山，與泰相對。泰曰：「兵法貴在不戰而屈人。今絕牛頭，維無反道，則我之禽也。」勑諸軍各堅壘勿與戰，遣使白淮，欲自南渡白水，循水而東，使淮趣牛頭，截其還路，可并取維，不惟安等而已。淮善其策，進率諸軍軍洮水。維懼，遁走，安等孤縣，遂皆降。) Sanguozhi vol. 22.) (Note: (淮乃使泰率討蜀護軍徐質、南安太守鄧艾進兵圍麴城，斷其運道及城外流水。安等挑戰，不許，將士困窘，分糧聚雪以引日月。維引兵救之，出自牛頭山，與泰相對。泰曰：「兵法貴在不戰而屈人。今絕牛頭，維無反道，則我之禽也。」敕諸軍各堅壘勿與戰，遣使白淮，使淮趣牛頭截其還路。淮從之，進軍洮水。) Zizhi Tongjian vol. 75.)

Deng Ai remained behind and garrisoned at the north of Baishui County. Three days later, Jiang Wei sent Liao Hua to lead a force to approach Deng Ai's camp from the south of Baishui. Deng Ai told his officers: "Jiang Wei has turned back to attack us. We have few troops. Ideally, we should cross the river and not build a bridge. I believe Jiang Wei must have sent Liao Hua to hinder us so that we are forced to remain here, while he would attack Taocheng (洮城) from the east." Taocheng was located north of the river and was about 60 li away from Deng Ai's position. Deng Ai immediately dispatched troops to travel overnight to Taocheng to defend the fortress. As he expected, Jiang Wei crossed the river to attack Taocheng, but failed to capture the fortress because Deng Ai had already strengthened its defences. For his achievements, Deng Ai was enfeoffed as a Secondary Marquis (關內侯), awarded the rank of General Who Attacks Rebels (討寇將軍), and subsequently appointed as the Administrator of Chengyang Commandery (城陽郡; around present-day Zhucheng, Shandong). (Note: (於是留艾屯白水北。三日，維遣廖化自白水南向艾結營。艾謂諸將曰：「維今卒還，吾軍人少，法當來渡而不作橋。此維使化持吾，令不得還。維必自東襲取洮城。」洮城在水北，去艾屯六十里。艾即夜潛軍徑到，維果來渡，而艾先至據城，得以不敗。賜爵關內侯，加討寇將軍，後遷城陽太守。) Sanguozhi vol. 28.)

== Military advisor service ==
Around the time, the Xiongnu prince Liu Bao, who was nominally a vassal under the Wei government, unified the Five Divisions of Xiongnu in Bing province and was building up his military force. Deng Ai wrote a memorial to the Wei imperial court: (Note: (是時并州右賢王劉豹并為一部， ...) Sanguozhi vol. 28.)

"The barbarians have the hearts of beasts and cannot be reasoned with. When they are powerful, they become violent; when they are weak, they pledge allegiance to the imperial court. This was why King Xuan of the Zhou dynasty was attacked by the Rongdi while Emperor Gao of the Han dynasty was besieged in Pingcheng. Whenever the Xiongnu grew powerful, the previous dynasties always saw them as a great threat. When the chanyu (Xiongnu ruler) lived in the barbarian lands, the imperial court could not directly control the chanyu and his followers. However, when the chanyu was lured to our territory to become a subject of the imperial court, the Xiongnu lost their leadership and could not cause trouble. As of now, as the chanyu has been living in the capital all this time, he has been alienated from his followers. At the same time, the Xiongnu prince Liu Bao has been living at the border and his military power has been increasing and he poses a threat to the imperial court. We should take extra precautionary measures against him. I heard that there are rebels within Liu Bao's domain, so we can try to split up his domain and hence reduce his military power. Qubei rendered meritorious service to the previous dynasty, but his son (possibly Liu Meng) was not allowed to inherit his domain. We should grant him an honorary title and let him remain at Yanmen Pass. The best strategy to maintain peace at the borders is to isolate the barbarian leaders from their home territories and give them some rewards for their past contributions." (Note: (... 艾上言曰：「戎狄獸心，不以義親，彊則侵暴，弱則內附，故周宣有玁狁之寇，漢祖有平城之困。每匈奴一盛，為前代重患。自單于在外，莫能牽制長卑。誘而致之，使來入侍。由是羌夷失統，合散無主。以單于在內，萬里順軌。今單于之尊日疏，外土之威寖重，則胡虜不可不深備也。聞劉豹部有叛胡，可因叛割為二國，以分其勢。去卑功顯前朝，而子不繼業，宜加其子顯號，使居鴈門。離國弱寇，追錄舊勳，此御邊長計也。」) Sanguozhi vol. 28.)

Deng Ai also suggested: "We should gradually segregate those Han Chinese living with barbarians, inculcate moral values such as integrity in them, so as to prevent them from resorting to unlawful actions." Sima Shi, the General-in-Chief (大將軍) who had recently taken over the reins of power as the regent of Wei, accepted Deng Ai's suggestions. He also appointed Deng Ai as the Administrator of Runan Commandery (汝南郡; in present-day southern Henan), where Deng lived in his younger days. Upon arriving in Runan to take office, Deng Ai sought a man who generously helped his father before because he wanted to repay that man for his kindness. However, he was disappointed to learn that the man had already died, so he sent his subordinates to pay respects at the man's tomb on his behalf. He also gave many gifts to the man's mother and recruited the man's son to be an accounting officer under him. During his tenure, Deng Ai developed wastelands in Runan and ensured that his soldiers and the common people had their basic needs fulfilled. (Note: (又陳：「羌胡與民同處者，宜以漸出之，使居民表崇廉恥之教，塞姦宄之路。」大將軍司馬景王新輔政，多納用焉。遷汝南太守，至則尋求昔所厚己吏父，乆已死，遣吏祭之，重遺其母，舉其子與計吏。艾所在，荒野開闢，軍民並豐。) Sanguozhi vol. 28.)

When the Wu regent Zhuge Ke retreated after a failed attempt to capture the Wei-controlled fortress at Hefei, Deng Ai approached the Wei regent Sima Shi and said: (Note: (諸葛恪圍合肥新城，不克，退歸。艾言景王曰： ...) Sanguozhi vol. 28.)

"Sun Quan is dead and most of the Wu officials are undecided on whose leadership to follow. Many Wu nobles and aristocrats have their own followers and private armies, and are capable of seizing the mandate to rule Wu. Zhuge Ke may have recently taken control of the Wu government, but he has no backing from the ruler. Besides, he cares little about consolidating power and instead treats the people harshly and continue to fight a war with us. He mobilised the people of Wu to attack our fortress and failed to conquer it after sustaining heavy losses. This is when he becomes an enemy of his own people. In the past, Wu Zixu, Wu Qi, Shang Yang and Yue Yi rose to prominence because they were favoured by their respective rulers, and they met their downfall after the ruler's death. Zhuge Ke is not only not comparable to these four great men, but also unaware that he is getting himself into deep trouble. His downfall is imminent." (Note: (... 「孫權已沒，大臣未附，吳名宗大族，皆有部曲，阻兵仗勢，足以建命。恪新秉國政，而內無其主，不念撫恤上下以立根基，競於外事，虐用其民，悉國之衆，頓於堅城，死者萬數，載禍而歸，此恪獲罪之日也。昔子胥、吳起、商鞅、樂毅皆見任時君，主沒而敗。况恪才非四賢，而不慮大患，其亡可待也。」) Sanguozhi vol. 28.)

As Deng Ai foresaw, Zhuge Ke was ousted from power not long after he returned to Wu and was killed along with his family. (Note: (恪歸，果見誅。) Sanguozhi vol. 28.) Deng Ai was appointed as the Inspector of Yan Province (兖州刺史) and promoted to General Who Inspires Might (振威將軍). He wrote a memorial to the Wei imperial court: (Note: (遷兖州刺史，加振威將軍。上言曰： ...) Sanguozhi vol. 28.)

"The most important policy areas are agriculture and war. If the state is wealthy, the army will be powerful. If the army is powerful, it will win battles. Therefore, the key to victory lies in agriculture. Confucius mentioned before, 'abundance in food supplies and number of troops'. Having abundant food supplies is important to maintaining a powerful army. If the state does not designate any officials to be in charge of collecting taxes and food supplies, there will be no one to accumulate wealth from the masses. As of now, the system of giving rewards based on merit is aimed at collecting food supplies and distributing them to the people. If not, the state will break off all its trade routes with the outside world, and a wealthy and prosperous state will become isolated." (Note: (... 「國之所急，惟農與戰，國富則兵彊，兵彊則戰勝。然農者，勝之本也。孔子曰『足食足兵』，食在兵前也。上無設爵之勸，則下無財畜之功。今使考績之賞，在於積粟富民，則交游之路絕，浮華之原塞矣。」) Sanguozhi vol. 28.)

== Suppression of Second Shouchun rebellion ==
Deng Ai was enfeoffed as the Marquis of Fangcheng Village (方城亭侯) after Cao Mao became the new Wei emperor in 254. In the following year, when the Wei generals Guanqiu Jian and Wen Qin started a rebellion in Shouchun (壽春; around present-day Shou County, Anhui), they sent messengers to other areas to incite the people to join their rebellion. Deng Ai arrested and executed the messengers, and then led troops to suppress the rebellion. His force occupied Yuejia (樂嘉; present-day Xiangcheng, Henan) and started building pontoon bridges. When the main Wei army led by Sima Shi showed up, Deng Ai rendezvoused with him and they advanced towards Shouchun together. The rebels were subsequently defeated. Deng Ai pursued the fleeing Wen Qin to Qiutou (丘頭; southeast of present-day Shenqiu County, Henan), but Wen Qin still managed to escape and defect to Wei's rival state, Wu. (Note: (高貴鄉公即尊位，進封方城亭侯。毌丘儉作亂，遣健步齎書，欲疑惑大衆，艾斬之，兼道進軍，先趣樂嘉城，作浮橋。司馬景王至，遂據之。文欽以後大軍破敗於城下，艾追之至丘頭。欽奔吳。) Sanguozhi vol. 28.)

The Wu general Sun Jun led thousands of troops and crossed the Yangtze to support the rebels. The Wei general Zhuge Dan ordered Deng Ai to resist the enemy at Feiyang (肥陽), but Deng saw that if he was stationed in Feiyang he would be in a disadvantageous position, so he relocated his troops to a neighbouring village. He then sent Zhuge Xu to attack the remaining rebels and Wu forces at Lijiang Village (黎漿亭; southeast of present-day Shou County, Anhui), where they defeated the enemy. (Note: (吳大將軍孫峻等號十萬衆，將渡江，鎮東將軍諸葛誕遣艾據肥陽，艾以與賊勢相遠，非要害之地，輒移屯附亭，遣泰山太守諸葛緒等於黎漿拒戰，遂走之。) Sanguozhi vol. 28.)

In the same year, Deng Ai was promoted to Colonel of Changshui (長水校尉). Later on, for his contributions in suppressing the rebellion, he was further promoted to acting General Who Stabilises the West (安西將軍) and his marquis rank was increased by one grade to Marquis of Fangcheng District (方城鄉侯). (Note: (其年徵拜長水校尉。以破欽等功，進封方城鄉侯，行安西將軍。) Sanguozhi vol. 28.)

== Defending Wei territory ==
Around 255, the Shu general Jiang Wei led forces to attack Wei and besieged Wang Jing, the Inspector of Yong Province, in Didao (狄道; southwest of present-day Lintao County, Gansu). The Wei imperial court appointed Deng Ai as General Who Stabilises the West (安西將軍) and Colonel Who Protects the Eastern Qiang (護東羌校尉) to lead troops to lift the siege. By then, Jiang Wei had withdrawn to Zhongti (鍾提; south of present-day Lintao County, Gansu), so many of Deng Ai's subordinates thought that Jiang Wei was exhausted and would not attack Didao again. However, Deng Ai held a different opinion and he said: (Note: (解雍州刺史王經圍於狄道，姜維退駐鍾提，乃以艾為安西將軍，假節、領護東羌校尉。議者多以為維力已竭，未能更出。) Sanguozhi vol. 28.)

"The defeat at the west of the Tao River was not an insignificant loss. The loss of troops and officers, depletion of stores and reserves, and displacement of refugees are signs pointing towards imminent destruction. I shall explain the situation. First, the enemy is riding on a wave of victories, while we are actually weak. Second, the enemy forces are well-trained and battle-ready, while ours are newly recruited and not well-equipped. Third, the enemy is less tired than us because we travel by land whereas they travel by water. Fourth, the enemy focuses on attacking Didao only, while we spread our defences across four locations – Didao, Longxi, Nan'an and Mount Qi. Fifth, Nan'an and Longxi have grain produced by the Qiang people, while there are fields of wheat beyond Mount Qi. The enemy is cunning. They will definitely come for the wheat." (Note: (艾曰：「洮西之敗，非小失也；破軍殺將，倉廩空虛，百姓流離，幾於危亡。今以策言之，彼有乘勝之勢，我有虛弱之實，一也。彼上下相習，五兵犀利，我將易兵新，器杖未復，二也。彼以船行，吾以陸軍，勞逸不同，三也。狄道、隴西、南安、祁山，各當有守，彼專為一，我分為四，四也。從南安、隴西，因食羌穀，若趣祁山，熟麥千頃，為之縣餌，五也。賊有黠數，其來必矣。」) Sanguozhi vol. 28.)

As Deng Ai predicted, Jiang Wei led his forces to attack Mount Qi later but were repelled by the defences set up by Deng. Jiang Wei retreated to Dong Village (董亭; south of present-day Wushan County, Gansu), while Deng Ai stationed his troops at Mount Wucheng (武城山). Jiang Wei tried to seize control of the mountainous terrain from Deng Ai, but was driven back. That night, Jiang Wei attempted to cross the Wei River to attack Shanggui (上邽; present-day Tianshui, Gansu). Deng Ai intercepted Jiang Wei at Duan Valley (段谷; southwest of present-day Tianshui, Gansu) and defeated him. (Note: (頃之，維果向祁山，聞艾已有備，乃回從董亭趣南安，艾據武城山以相持。維與艾爭險，不克，其夜，渡渭東行，緣山趣上邽，艾與戰於段谷，大破之。) Sanguozhi vol. 28.) In 256, the Wei imperial court issued an edict as follows:

"The cunning enemy Jiang Wei has been inciting the local tribes to rebel against the government, resulting in chaos in the western lands. Deng Ai planned his strategies well, and displayed courage and loyalty in battle. He defeated tens of enemy officers and killed thousands of enemy troops. Our state has caused the Bashu region to tremble in fear, while our military might spreads beyond the rivers. Deng Ai is hereby appointed as General Who Guards the West (鎮西將軍) and put in charge of overseeing military affairs in Longyou. He shall also be enfeoffed as the Marquis of Deng (鄧侯), and given 500 taxable households as his marquisate. His son, Deng Zhong (鄧忠), shall be enfeoffed as a village marquis (亭侯)." (Note: (甘露元年詔曰：「逆賊姜維連年狡黠，民夷騷動，西土不寧。艾籌畫有方，忠勇奮發，斬將十數，馘首千計；國威震於巴、蜀，武聲揚於江、岷。今以艾為鎮西將軍、都督隴右諸軍事，進封鄧侯。分五百戶封子忠為亭侯。」) Sanguozhi vol. 28.)

In the following year, Jiang Wei advanced to the Mang river in his attempt to attack the position of Deng Ai and Sima Wang. However, both Wei generals refused to engage and held their position.

Deng Ai defeated Jiang Wei in battle again along the Great Wall and forced him to retreat back to Shu. He was further promoted to General Who Attacks the West (征西將軍), and had the number of taxable households in his marquisate increased to 6,600.

In 262, he defeated Jiang Wei in battle at Houhe (侯和). Jiang Wei retreated to Tazhong (沓中; northwest of present-day Zhugqu County, Gansu) and garrisoned there. (Note: (二年，拒姜維於長城，維退還。遷征西將軍，前後增邑凡六千六百戶。景元三年，又破維於侯和，維却保沓中。) Sanguozhi vol. 28.)

== Conquest of Shu ==
=== Strategic planning and opening moves ===
In the autumn of 263, the Wei imperial government started mobilising troops in preparation for a campaign against Shu. Sima Zhao, who oversaw the campaign, ordered Deng Ai to lead 30,000 troops (Note: (四年秋，乃下詔使鄧艾、諸葛緒各統諸軍三萬餘人， ...) Sanguozhi vol. 28.) to Tazhong (沓中; northwest of present-day Zhugqu County, Gansu) to harass Jiang Wei and keep him occupied, while Zhuge Xu, the Inspector of Yong Province, would lead forces to block Jiang Wei's retreat route back to Shu. (Note: (四年秋，詔諸軍征蜀，大將軍司馬文王皆指授節度，使艾與維相綴連；雍州刺史諸葛緒要維，令不得歸。) Sanguozhi vol. 28.) Before Deng Ai embarked on the campaign against Shu, he dreamt of himself sitting on a mountaintop with water flowing near him. He asked an official, Yuan Shao (爰邵), who was well-versed in the Yijing, to explain to him what his dream meant. Yuan Shao told him that he would successfully conquer Shu, but would not return to Wei. Deng Ai felt gloomy after hearing this. (Note: (初，艾當伐蜀，夢坐山上而有流水，以問殄虜護軍爰邵。邵曰：「按易卦，山上有水曰蹇。蹇繇曰：『蹇利西南，不利東北。』孔子曰：『蹇利西南，往有功也；不利東北，其道窮也。』往必克蜀，殆不還乎！」艾憮然不樂。) Sanguozhi vol. 28.)

Deng Ai sent Wang Qi (王頎) to lead troops attack Jiang Wei's camp directly, with Qian Hong leading another force to clear the path, and Yang Xin (楊欣) to attack the enemy positions at Gansong (甘松; around present-day Songpan County, Sichuan). (Note: (艾遣天水太守王頎等直攻維營，隴西太守牽弘等邀其前，金城太守楊欣等詣甘松。) Sanguozhi vol. 28.)

When Jiang Wei received news that another Wei army led by Zhong Hui had occupied Hanzhong Commandery, he led his troops from Tazhong back further into Shu territory, but was pursued by Yang Xin to Qiangchuankou (彊川口; the intersection of the Bailong and Jialing rivers), where he was defeated. Jiang Wei learnt that Zhuge Xu had blocked his retreat route at the bridge of Yinping, so he led his men through Konghan Valley (孔函谷; south of present-day Xigu District, Lanzhou, Gansu) to the northern road in an attempt to bypass Zhuge Xu's position. When Zhuge Xu heard about it, he retreated back by 30 li. By then, Jiang Wei and his troops had travelled about 30 li on the northern road when they heard that Zhuge Xu had lifted the blockade at the bridge. Jiang Wei ordered his troops to quickly turn back and cross the bridge. Zhuge Xu tried to turn back to block Jiang Wei again but arrived at the bridge one day too late. After crossing the bridge, Jiang Wei moved to the mountain pass of Jiange and garrisoned there. Zhong Hui attacked Jiang Wei at Jiange several times but was unable to breach the defences. (Note: (維聞鍾會諸軍已入漢中，引退還。欣等追躡於彊川口，大戰，維敗走。聞雍州已塞道屯橋頭，從孔函谷入北道，欲出雍州後。諸葛緒聞之，却還三十里。維入北道三十餘里，聞緒軍却，尋還，從橋頭過，緒趣截維，較一日不及。維遂東引，還守劒閣。鍾會攻維未能克。) Sanguozhi vol. 28.)

=== Capture of the Shu capital ===
Deng Ai proposed:

"The enemy has suffered a setback. We should take advantage of our success to press on the attack. From Yinping (陰平; northwest of present-day Wen County, Gansu), there is a shortcut passing through Deyang Village (德陽亭; around present-day Deyang, Sichuan) to Fu County (涪縣; present-day Mianyang, Sichuan), leading to an area 100 li west from Jiange and about 300 li from Chengdu, the heartland of Shu. We can send a strike force to take this route to attack Chengdu. When Fu County is under attack, Jiang Wei will definitely send troops from Jiange to reinforce Fu County, and then Zhong Hui's army can move through the main road to attack the enemy. If Jiang Wei does not send reinforcements from Jiange, Fu County will be isolated. As military texts say, 'Attack the enemy where they are unprepared, and appear where you are not expected'. If we can strike the enemy at their weak points, we will eventually overcome them." (Note: (艾上言：「今賊摧折，宜遂乘之，從陰平由邪徑經漢德陽亭趣涪，出劒閣西百里，去成都三百餘里，奇兵衝其腹心。劒閣之守必還赴涪，則會方軌而進；劒閣之軍不還，則應涪之兵寡矣。軍志有之曰：『攻其不備，出其不意。』今掩其空虛，破之必矣。」) Sanguozhi vol. 28.)

Zhong Hui approved Deng Ai's idea and even ordered his subordinate Tian Zhang (田章) to join Deng Ai on the expedition. Some time between 18 November and 17 December 263, (Note: Deng Ai's biography in the Sanguozhi recorded that he took the shortcut in the 10th month of the 4th year of the Jingyuan era of Cao Huan's reign. This month corresponds to 18 November to 17 December 263 in the Gregorian calendar.) Deng Ai led a strike force from Yinping through the shortcut, bypassing the west of Jiange and heading straight towards Jiangyou. The shortcut covered a distance of more than 700 li and cut across mountainous terrain. Deng Ai and his men had to construct several bridges along the way. The mountains were high and the valleys were deep, which made the journey extremely dangerous. After some time, they were completely cut off from their supply train. Deng Ai wrapped himself in a large piece of felt and rolled down the mountain. His men climbed trees and scaled cliffs in single file. Along the way, they encountered three groups of Shu ambushers, defeated them and destroyed their camps. Deng Ai let Tian Zhang lead the vanguard and clear the path. Deng Ai and his vanguard showed up at Jiangyou. Ma Miao (馬邈), the Shu-appointed administrator of Jiangyou, gave up resistance and surrendered to Deng Ai.

The Shu general Zhuge Zhan led an army from Fu County to Mianzhu, where they engaged Deng Ai and his troops in battle. Deng Ai ordered his son Deng Zhong (鄧忠) to flank the enemy from the right, and Shi Zuan (師纂) to flank the enemy from the left. Both Deng Zhong and Shi Zuan were driven back by Zhuge Zhan, and they told Deng Ai: "The enemy cannot be defeated.". Deng Ai sternly replied: "This battle will determine whether we live or die. What do you mean when you say the enemy cannot be defeated?" He wanted to execute them, but they turned back and hastily readied their troops for battle again. They defeated the Shu forces and killed the enemy officers Zhuge Zhan, Zhuge Shang and Zhang Zun. (Note: (蜀衞將軍諸葛瞻自涪還綿竹，列陳待艾。艾遣子惠唐亭侯忠等出其右，司馬師纂等出其左。忠、纂戰不利，並退還，曰：「賊未可擊。」艾怒曰：「存亡之分，在此一舉，何不可之有？」乃叱忠、纂等，將斬之。忠、纂馳還更戰，大破之，斬瞻及尚書張遵等首， ...) Sanguozhi vol. 28.)

Deng Ai and his men then pressed on further to Luo County (雒縣; north of present-day Guanghan, Sichuan). Liu Shan, the Shu emperor, sent an emissary to present his imperial seal to Deng Ai and indicate his wish to surrender. (Note: (... 進軍到雒。劉禪遣使奉皇帝璽綬，為箋詣艾請降。) Sanguozhi vol. 28.)

=== Managing post-war Shu ===
When Deng Ai arrived in Chengdu, Liu Shan tied himself up and led an entourage of over 60 people to officially surrender. Deng Ai freed Liu Shan from his bonds and treated him kindly. He also forbid his soldiers from plundering and pillaging the city, and ordered that daily activities in the city resume as per normal. Many former Shu officials were so impressed with Deng Ai that they willingly submitted to him; the people of Shu also praised Deng Ai for his kindness. Deng Ai used his acting imperial authority granted by the Wei government to appoint Liu Shan as acting General of Chariots of Cavalry (驃騎將軍) and grant titles to many former Shu nobles and officials; some of them became his subordinates. Deng Ai also appointed Shi Zuan as the Inspector of Yi Province and put Qian Hong in charge of overseeing the former Shu commanderies. A memorial was constructed at Mianzhu to glorify Deng Ai's victory over Zhuge Zhan, and the fallen Wei soldiers were buried alongside their Shu counterparts. (Note: (艾至成都，禪率太子諸王及群臣六十餘人靣縛輿櫬詣軍門，艾執節解縛焚櫬，受而宥之。檢御將士，無所虜畧，綏納降附，使復舊業，蜀人稱焉。輙依鄧禹故事，承制拜禪行驃騎將軍，太子奉車、諸王駙馬都尉。蜀群司各隨高下拜為王官，或領艾官屬。以師纂領益州刺史，隴西太守牽弘等領蜀中諸郡。使於緜竹築臺以為京觀，用彰戰功。士卒死事者，皆與蜀兵同共埋藏。) Sanguozhi vol. 28.)

Deng Ai became arrogant about his achievements in conquering Shu. He once bragged to the former Shu officials: "All of you are lucky to have encountered me, which is why you are where you are today. If you encountered someone like Wu Han, you would have been destroyed." He also said: "Jiang Wei is a short-lived hero. He pales in comparison with me." Some people scorned him for his boastfulness. (Note: (艾深自矜伐，謂蜀士大夫曰：「諸君賴遭某，故得有今日耳。若遇吳漢之徒，已殄滅矣。」又曰：「姜維自一時雄兒也，與某相值，故窮耳。」有識者笑之。) Sanguozhi vol. 28.)

On 8 February 264, the Wei imperial court issued an edict praising Deng Ai for his successful conquest of Shu and comparing him to famous generals such as Bai Qi, Han Xin, Wu Han and Zhou Yafu. Deng Ai was promoted to the position of Grand Commandant (太尉) in the imperial court and had the number of taxable households in his marquisate increased by 20,000. His two sons were made village marquises (亭侯) and given 1,000 taxable households each in their marquisates. (Note: (十二月，詔曰：「艾曜威奮武，深入虜庭，斬將搴旗，梟其鯨鯢，使僭號之主稽首係頸，歷世逋誅，一朝而平。兵不踰時，戰不終日，雲徹席卷，蕩定巴蜀。雖白起破彊楚，韓信克勁趙，吳漢禽子陽，亞夫滅七國，計功論美，不足比勳也。其以艾為太尉，增邑二萬戶，封子二人亭侯，各食邑千戶。」) Sanguozhi vol. 28.)

== Downfall and death ==
=== Correspondence between Deng Ai and Sima Zhao ===
Deng Ai wrote to Sima Zhao, suggesting that they let the weary troops rest and recuperate while concurrently making preparations for a future campaign against Wei's other rival state, Wu. He also proposed that Liu Shan be treated generously by making him a prince and showering him with luxuries. The purpose of doing so was to induce and tempt Sun Xiu, the Wu emperor, into voluntarily surrendering to Wei. He wrote:

"In war, we always tend to exaggerate our prowess before we actually take military action. Now that we have pacified Shu, we should ride on this wave of victory and proceed to attack Wu. The people of Wu are terrified. Now is the time to conquer the Empire. However, after this campaign, our troops are weary and exhausted, so we cannot launch another campaign any time soon. We should let them rest and recuperate first. I suggest we leave 20,000 troops in Longyou (隴右) and another 20,000 in Shu to stockpile resources, build warships, and make other preparations for a future campaign against Wu. When we are ready, we will announce to the people in Wu that they are in a precarious situation, and then persuade them to surrender. Wu will definitely submit to us. If this happens, we will conquer Wu without fighting a war. As of now, we should treat Liu Shan generously, so as to induce Sun Xiu and the people of Wu into surrendering to us. If we send Liu Shan to Luoyang, the people of Wu will think that we are holding him hostage. This is not beneficial to our plan of winning them over. I suggest we let Liu Shan remain in Shu until late next year. By then, Wu would have been completely pacified. We can grant Liu Shan the title "Prince of Fufeng", and endow him with material wealth and luxuries, so as to let him enjoy life for now. The former residence of Dong Zhuo in Fufeng can be converted into Liu Shan's new residence. We can also grant titles of dukes and marquises to Liu Shan's sons and give them counties in Fufeng Commandery as their personal estate. This will show others that those who submit to our imperial court will be treated very well. In the meantime, we can also create estates in Guangling and Chengyang to receive those from Wu who surrender to us. By doing so, Wu will tremble at our might and have no choice but to submit to us." (Note: (艾言司馬文王曰：「兵有先聲而後實者，今因平蜀之勢以乘吴，吴人震恐，席卷之時也。然大舉之後，將士疲勞，不可便用，且徐緩之；留隴右兵二萬人，蜀兵二萬人，煑鹽興冶，為軍農要用，並作舟船，豫順流之事，然後發使告以利害，吴必歸化，可不征而定也。今宜厚劉禪以致孫休，安士民以來遠人，若便送禪於京都，吴以為流徙，則於向化之心不勸。宜權停留，須來年秋冬，比爾吴亦足平。以為可封禪為扶風王，錫其資財，供其左右。郡有董卓塢，為之宮舍。爵其子為公侯，食郡內縣，以顯歸命之寵。開廣陵、城陽以待吴人，則畏威懷德，望風而從矣。」) Sanguozhi vol. 28.)

Sima Zhao sent Wei Guan to reply Deng Ai that his proposal would be submitted to the Wei imperial court for further deliberation before it could be implemented. (Note: (文王使監軍衞瓘喻艾：「事當須報，不宜輙行。」) Sanguozhi vol. 28.) Deng Ai grew impatient and argued that they would be wasting time if they had to wait for further instructions from the imperial court before taking action. He quoted lines from the Spring and Autumn Annals and The Art of War to hint that he was justified in ignoring standard protocol and acting autocratically as long as what he did was to Wei's benefit. He wrote:

"I was commissioned by the Emperor to attack Shu. Now that the enemy leaders have surrendered, I can grant them official positions under the imperial system, so as to secure their allegiance. My actions suit the present circumstances. Now that all of Shu has surrendered, we control all the lands stretching to the southern sea and share eastern borders with Wu, which we should pacify as soon as possible. If we wait for further instructions from the Emperor, we will end up wasting time because of the time taken to deliver reports. The Spring and Autumn Annals mentioned that when a general leads a campaign to a distant land, he is allowed to act in an authoritarian manner as long as his actions are beneficial to the state he serves. As of now, Wu has yet to be pacified. It shares borders with Shu, so we should not forsake this opportunity just because we need to follow standard protocol. The Art of War also stated that 'a general who advances not to covet fame can retreat without fearing that he will be disgraced.' Although I may not be like the ancients, I will not look down on myself and do harm to my state." (Note: (艾重言曰：「銜命征行，奉指授之策，元惡旣服；至於承制拜假，以安初附，謂合權宜。今蜀舉衆歸命，地盡南海，東接吳會，宜早鎮定。若待國命，往復道途，延引日月。春秋之義，大夫出疆，有可以安社稷，利國家，專之可也。今吴未賔；勢與蜀連，不可拘常以失事機。兵法，進不求名，退不避罪，艾雖無古人之節，終不自嫌以損于國也。」) Sanguozhi vol. 28.)

=== Zhong Hui's role in Deng Ai's arrest ===
Zhong Hui, Hu Lie (胡烈), Shi Zuan (師纂) and others accused Deng Ai of showing disrespect for the Wei imperial court's authority, and claimed that he was likely to start a rebellion. (Note: (鍾會、胡烈、師纂等皆白艾所作悖逆，變釁以結。) Sanguozhi vol. 28.) The Shiyu mentioned that Zhong Hui was skilled in imitating people's handwriting. After getting his hands on a letter written by Deng Ai to Sima Zhao, (Note: It is not clear whether this letter refers to either of the two letters written by Deng Ai to Sima Zhao, or another letter.) he edited it to make it sound arrogant and demanding. At the same time, he also destroyed a letter from Sima Zhao to Deng Ai to increase Sima's suspicions towards Deng. (Note: (世語曰：會善效人書，於劒閣要艾章表白事，皆易其言，令辭指悖傲，多自矜伐。又毀文王報書，手作以疑之也。) Shiyu annotation in Sanguozhi vol. 28.)

Sometime in late February or early March 264, the Wei imperial court then issued an edict ordering Deng Ai to be arrested and transported back to the capital, Luoyang. Wei Guan and Zhong Hui went to Deng Ai's camp, where they used Sima Zhao's letter to order Deng Ai's men to put down their weapons. Deng Ai was arrested and placed in a prison cart for his journey to Luoyang. (Note: (會內有異志，因鄧艾承制專事，密白艾有反狀，於是詔書檻車徵艾。司馬文王懼艾或不從命，勑會並進軍成都，監軍衞瓘在會前行，以文王手筆令宣喻艾軍，艾軍皆釋仗，遂收艾入檻車。) Sanguozhi vol. 28.) When he was arrested, Deng Ai exclaimed: "I am a loyal subject, yet I meet with such a fate! Whatever that happened to Bai Qi in the past has just happened to me in the present." (Note: (魏氏春秋曰：艾仰天歎曰：「艾忠臣也，一至此乎！白起之酷，復見於今日矣。」) Wei Shi Chunqiu annotation in Sanguozhi vol. 28.)

=== Death ===
After Deng Ai was escorted away, Zhong Hui started a rebellion against Wei in Chengdu on 1 March 264, but the rebellion failed when some Wei officers, who were unwilling to participate, mutinied against Zhong Hui and killed him on 3 March 264. After Zhong Hui's death, Deng Ai's subordinates caught up with the convoy escorting their general, freed him, and brought him back to Chengdu. When Wei Guan heard about it, he ordered Tian Xu to lead troops to attack Deng Ai. (Note: (艾父子旣囚，鍾會至成都，先送艾，然後作亂。會已死，艾本營將士追出艾檻車，迎還。瓘遣田續等討艾， ...) Sanguozhi vol. 28.)

Tian Xu had initially served under Deng Ai during the campaign against Shu. During an earlier battle at Jiangyou, Deng Ai wanted to execute Tian Xu for delaying his advance against the enemy, but spared him eventually. When Wei Guan sent Tian Xu to attack Deng Ai, he told Tian, "You can now take revenge against Deng Ai for how he humiliated you at Jiangyou." (Note: (漢晉春秋曰：初艾之下江由也，以續不進，欲斬，旣而捨之。及瓘遣續，謂曰：「可以報江由之辱矣。」) Han Jin Chunqiu annotation in Sanguozhi vol. 28.)

Tian Xu and his soldiers intercepted Deng Ai at the west of Mianzhu and killed him along with his son, Deng Zhong (鄧忠), and Shi Zuan. (Note: (世語曰：師纂亦與艾俱死。纂性急少恩，死之日體無完皮。) Shiyu annotation in Sanguozhi vol. 28.) After Deng Ai's death, his other son(s) in Luoyang was/were also rounded up and executed, while his surviving family members were exiled to the Western Regions. (Note: (... 遇於緜竹西，斬之。子忠與艾俱死，餘子在洛陽者悉誅，徙艾妻子及孫於西域。) Sanguozhi vol. 28.)

When the Wei general Du Yu heard about what Wei Guan told Tian Xu, he remarked that Wei Guan, as a man of high social status, should not behave in such a petty and spiteful manner. When Wei Guan heard about Du Yu's remarks, he immediately went to meet Du Yu to thank him. (Note: (杜預言於衆曰：「伯玉其不免乎！身為名士，位望已高，旣無德音，又不御下以正，是小人而乘君子之器，將何以堪其責乎？」瓘聞之，不俟駕而謝。) Han Jin Chunqiu annotation in Sanguozhi vol. 28.)

== Posthumous rehabilitation ==
In 266, after the Jin dynasty replaced the Wei regime in February, Sima Yan (Emperor Wu) issued an imperial edict to pardon Deng Ai's descendants and allow them to return from exile. He noted that Deng Ai was fairly punished for his arrogance and audacity, but the "redeeming" factor was that Deng Ai did not resist arrest and willingly resigned to his fate. (Note: (泰始元年，晉室踐阼，詔曰：「昔太尉王淩謀廢齊王，而王竟不足以守位。征西將軍鄧艾，矜功失節，實應大辟。然被書之日，罷遣人衆，束手受罪，比於求生遂為惡者，誠復不同。今大赦得還，若無子孫者聽使立後，令祭祀不絕。」) Sanguozhi vol. 28.)

When Deng Ai was stationed in Yong and Liang provinces, he strengthened the parapets in the area and had some forts constructed for defensive purposes. During the mid-Taishi era (265–274) in Emperor Wu's reign, the Qiang tribes in Yong Province rebelled against Jin rule and killed the Inspector of Liang Province. The surviving officials and local residents found safety in the forts built by Deng Ai about a decade earlier. (Note: (艾在西時，修治障塞，築起城塢。泰始中，羗虜大叛，頻殺刺史，涼州道斷。吏民安全者，皆保艾所築塢焉。) Sanguozhi vol. 28.)

== Legacy ==
=== Family and descendants ===
Deng Ai had at least two sons. Two of his sons – one of whom was Deng Zhong (鄧忠) – held village marquis titles and owned marquisates of 1,000 taxable households. Deng Zhong was killed along with his father. Deng Ai's other sons who were in Luoyang were arrested and executed in the aftermath of their father's death. Deng Ai's surviving family members were exiled and allowed to return only in 266 after Emperor Wu of the Jin dynasty issued an imperial edict pardoning them. (Note: Sima Yan only ascended the throne in Feb 266. Thus, Deng Ai's surviving family members only returned in or after Feb 266.)

In 273, Emperor Wu appointed Deng Ai's grandson, Deng Lang (鄧朗), as a langzhong (郎中). (Note: (九年，詔曰：「艾有功勳，受罪不逃刑，而子孫為民隷，朕常愍之。其以嫡孫朗為郎中。」) Sanguozhi vol. 28.) Deng Lang served as the Prefect of Danshui County (丹水縣; around present-day Xichuan County, Henan) and then as the Prefect of Dingling County (定陵縣; around present-day Qingyang County, Anhui). He had at least one son, Deng Tao (鄧韜). During the Yongjia era (307–313) in the reign of Emperor Huai, Deng Lang was appointed as the Administrator of Xindu Commandery (新都郡; around present-day Guanghan, Sichuan). However, before he left to assume office, he died in a fire in Xiangyang Commandery along with his mother, wife and children. Only his grandson Deng Xing (鄧行), Deng Tao's son, survived the fire.

Deng Qianqiu (鄧千秋), another grandson of Deng Ai, was recruited to serve under Wang Rong, a prominent Jin dynasty official. He died before Deng Lang while his two sons also perished in the Xiangyang fire. (Note: (先是以艾孫朗為丹水令，由此遷為定陵令。次孫千秋有時望，光祿大夫王戎辟為掾。永嘉中，朗為新都太守，未之官，在襄陽失火，朗及母妻子舉室燒死，惟子韜子行得免。千秋先卒，二子亦燒死。) Shiyu annotation in Sanguozhi vol. 28.)

=== Appraisal ===
Chen Shou (233–297), who wrote Deng Ai's biography in the Sanguozhi, commented on Deng Ai as follows: "Deng Ai was upright and strong. He achieved many successes, but failed to protect himself from hidden pitfalls and dangers, which resulted in his eventual downfall. He could envision what would happen to Zhuge Ke, yet ironically could not foresee his own fate. This was probably what the ancients called 'lack of self-awareness and narrow-mindedness'." (Note: (評曰： ... 鄧艾矯然彊壯，立功立事，然闇於防患，咎敗旋至，豈遠知乎諸葛恪而不能近自見，此蓋古人所謂目論者也。) Sanguozhi vol. 28.)

In 267, Duan Zhuo (段灼) wrote a memorial to Emperor Wu of the Jin dynasty to speak up for Deng Ai. In the memorial, Duan Zhuo discussed Deng Ai's contributions to Wei and argued that Deng had no intention of rebelling against Wei, citing Deng's advanced age (Deng was nearing 70 at the time of his death) as one reason. He also mentioned that Deng Ai had been deeply misunderstood because of his boorish and uncouth behaviour, which made him likely to offend people easily. Duan Zhuo also compared Deng Ai to Bai Qi and Wu Zixu, two generals in the Spring and Autumn period who made great contributions to their respective states but were forced to commit suicide. (Note: ([泰始]三年，議郎段灼上疏理艾曰：「艾心懷至忠而荷反逆之名，平定巴蜀而受夷滅之誅，臣竊悼之。惜哉，言艾之反也！艾性剛急，輕犯雅俗，不能恊同朋類，故莫肯理之。臣敢言艾不反之狀。 ...七十老公，反欲何求！... 赦寃魂於黃泉，收信義於後世，葬一人而天下慕其行，埋一魂而天下歸其義，所為者寡而恱者衆矣。」) Sanguozhi vol. 28.)

During the mid-Xianning era (275–280) in Emperor Wu's reign, Fan Zhen (樊震), a general who previously served under Deng Ai during the Wei campaign against Shu, had an audience with the emperor. When Emperor Wu asked about Deng Ai, Fan Zhen became very emotional and he recalled that Deng Ai was a very loyal subject of Wei. (Note: (世語曰：咸寧中，積射將軍樊震為西戎牙門，得見辭，武帝問震所由進，震自陳曾為鄧艾伐蜀時帳下將，帝遂尋問艾，震具申艾之忠，言之流涕。) Shiyu annotation in Sanguozhi vol. 28.)

=== In popular culture ===
Deng Ai is first introduced as a playable character in the seventh instalment of Koei's Dynasty Warriors video game series. In the games, he is anachronistically associated with the Jin dynasty faction; historically, he died one year before the Jin dynasty was established.

== See also ==
- Lists of people of the Three Kingdoms

== Appendix ==
=== References ===
Citations from the Sanguozhi

Citations from the Sanguozhi zhu

Other citations

=== Primary sources ===
- Chen, Shou (3rd century). Records of the Three Kingdoms (Sanguozhi).
- Pei, Songzhi (5th century). Annotated Records of the Three Kingdoms (Sanguozhi zhu).

=== Secondary sources ===
- Declercq, Dominik (1998). Writing Against the State: Political Rhetorics in Third and Fourth Century China. New York: Köln Brill.
- de Crespigny, Rafe (2007). A Biographical Dictionary of Later Han to the Three Kingdoms 23-220 AD. Leiden: Brill. ISBN 9789004156050.
- Sima, Guang (1084). Zizhi Tongjian.
- Yuan, Tingdong (1988). War in Ancient China (first ed.). Chengdu: Sichuan Academy of Social Science Publishing House. ISBN 7-80524-058-2.
