= Xi Zheng =

Chinese essayist, poet, and official (died 278)

- 郤正

Administrator of Baxi (巴西太守)
- In office 273 – 278
- Monarch: Emperor Wu of Jin

Prefect of Anyang (安陽令)
- In office ? – 273
- Monarch: Emperor Wu of Jin

Director of the Palace Library (秘書令)
- In office ?–?
- Monarch: Liu Shan

Assistant in the Palace Library (秘書郎)
- In office ?–?
- Monarch: Liu Shan

Personal details
- Born: Unknown Yanshi, Henan
- Died: 278
- Parent: Xi Yi (father)
- Occupation: Essayist, poet, politician
- Courtesy name: Lingxian (令先)
- Birth name: Xi Zuan (郤纂)
- Peerage: Secondary Marquis (關內侯)

Xi Zheng (died 278), courtesy name Lingxian, was a Chinese essayist, poet, and politician of the state of Shu Han during the late Three Kingdoms period of China. He also served as an official under Emperor Wu of the Jin dynasty.

== Background and early life ==
Xi Zheng's ancestral home was in Yanshi, Henan. His grandfather Xi Jian (郤俭) was Inspector of Yi Province (covering present-day Sichuan and Chongqing) during the reign of Emperor Ling of Han. However, his rule was despotic; Liu Yan, who wanted to become the Governor of Yi Province (after initially eyeing the post of Governor of Jiaozhi), was successful in his request, and one of his tasks was to arrest Xi Jian and put Xi on trial. However, before Liu Yan reached Yi Province, Xi Jian was killed by rebels led by Ma Xiang (马相) and Zhao Zhi (赵祗). With Xi Jian's death, his son Xi Yi (郤揖; fl.188-220) was stranded in Yi Province; Xi Yi later served under Meng Da and joined Meng in defecting to Cao Wei in c.late August 220.

Xi Zheng's birth name was Xi Zuan (郤纂); when Xi Zheng was still a boy, Xi Yi died and Xi Zheng's mother remarried. Although he was destitute, he was gifted in language and mostly self-educated in the fields of history and government, borrowing books and essays from literati throughout Yi Province. He entered government service as a clerk of the palace library, eventually rising to the rank of director over the course of 30 years.

== Fall of Shu Han and aftermath ==
As director of the imperial library, Xi Zheng was a fairly high-ranking official in the Shu government. The powerful eunuch Huang Hao was ambivalent towards him, so Xi Zheng was able to avoid the factionalism that Huang Hao's rise to power engendered.

Xi Zheng's foremost contribution to history was his composition of Liu Shan's surrender document to the Wei general Deng Ai, which survives in the Records of the Three Kingdoms. Xi Zheng remained extremely loyal to Liu Shan, and was one of two former high-ranking Shu officials who abandoned their families and travelled with Liu Shan to Luoyang during Zhong Hui's Rebellion in 264. He was one of five former Shu officials to be enfeoffed as marquises by the Wei government.

In Luoyang, Liu Shan relied on Xi Zheng in matters of deportment and propriety. According to Xi Zuochi's Han Jin Chunqiu, the Wei regent Sima Zhao once asked Liu Shan if he thought much about Shu, to which Liu Shan famously responded that he was too happy to think of Shu. Xi Zheng sought out Liu Shan and advised him that were he asked this again, the appropriate response was to lament how far he had been removed from his family tombs.

In 273, Xi Zheng was appointed as the Administrator of Baxi Commandery (巴西郡), in present-day eastern Sichuan and northern Chongqing. This would have allowed him to return west in his old age. Of his works, only Liu Shan's surrender document to Deng Ai and one other essay survive; both are recorded in the base text of Records of the Three Kingdoms.

== See also ==
- Lists of people of the Three Kingdoms
