= Emperor Ling =

Emperor Ling may refer to:

- Emperor Ling of Han (156–189)
- Lü Zuan (died 401), emperor of Later Liang
