= Zhong Hui's Rebellion =

Rebellion in the state of Cao Wei (264)

- Part of the wars of the Three Kingdoms period
Date	1–3 March 264
Location	Chengdu, Sichuan, China
Result	Zhong Hui and Jiang Wei killed by mutinying troops; Deng Ai and his son executed; rebellion suppressed

Belligerents
Zhong Hui	Cao Wei	Mutinying forces under Zhong Hui

Commanders and leaders
Zhong Hui †; Jiang Wei †; Zhang Yi †	Sima Zhao; Jia Chong; Deng Ai (executed); Deng Zhong (executed)	Wei Guan; Hu Lie; Hu Yuan; Qiu Jian

Zhong Hui's Rebellion was a rebellion in March 264 led by Zhong Hui, a general of the state of Cao Wei, against the Wei regent, Sima Zhao. Zhong Hui had support from Jiang Wei, a general from the former state of Shu Han, which was conquered by Wei forces just before the rebellion started. Zhong Hui, as one of the Wei commanders in the Conquest of Shu by Wei, had considered himself capable enough to overcome the Wei regime and establish his own kingdom in the newly conquered Shu territory. The rebellion ended when some Wei officers and soldiers, who were unwilling to join Zhong Hui, started a mutiny against him and killed him and Jiang Wei.

== Background ==
Initially, when Sima Zhao wanted to put Zhong Hui in charge of leading the Wei army to conquer Shu, Shao Ti warned him that Zhong Hui might rebel against Wei because he was in command of an army of thousands, was single, and had no family to worry about. Sima Zhao laughed and said he understood Shao Ti's concern very well, but chose to let Zhong Hui lead the Wei army because he had faith in Zhong's ability to conquer Shu. He also predicted that Zhong Hui would not succeed even if he rebelled because of two reasons. First, the people of Shu would be fearful after seeing how their state had been conquered, and hence would not help Zhong Hui. Second, the Wei forces would be exhausted after the campaign and want to return home, so they would not support Zhong. (Note: (初，文王欲遣會伐蜀，西曹屬邵悌求見曰：「今遣鍾會率十餘萬衆伐蜀，愚謂會單身無重任，不若使餘人行。」文王笑曰：「我寧當復不知此耶？蜀為天下作患，使民不得安息，我今伐之如指掌耳，而衆人皆言蜀不可伐。夫人心豫怯則智勇並竭，智勇並竭而彊使之，適為敵禽耳。惟鍾會與人意同，今遣會伐蜀，必可滅蜀。滅蜀之後，就如卿所慮，當何所能一辦耶？凡敗軍之將不可以語勇，亡國之大夫不可與圖存，心膽以破故也。若蜀以破，遺民震恐，不足與圖事；中國將士各自思歸，不肯與同也。若作惡，祗自滅族耳。卿不須憂此，慎莫使人聞也。」) Sanguozhi vol. 28.)

Both Deng Ai and Zhong Hui had taken part in the Conquest of Shu in 263, having acted as foils to each other during the invasion – where Zhong Hui had demanded an advance through Jiange, Deng Ai had instead chosen to move through Yinping. Jiang Wei, having been surprised from Zhong Hui's eastern offensive, moved all troops from Yinping to halt Zhong Hui's advance. As a result, Deng Ai's advance through Yinping was swift enough to allow him to quickly reach Chengdu and demand Liu Shan's surrender.

In the following occupation of the Shu territory, Deng Ai began issuing orders in Chengdu an autocratic fashion, while Zhong Hui began exhibiting signs of hubris, believing himself to no longer be capable of serving under another. Jiang Wei, by contrast, liaised with Liu Shan, outlining a plan to trick Zhong Hui into rebellion, weakening Wei troops, before killing Zhong and seizing power of the troops while re-declaring Shu's independence.

== Preparation ==
Zhong Hui's first course of action was to falsify letters proving a purported plan by Deng Ai to rebel, creating distrust between Sima Zhao and Deng Ai; this was supplemented by Deng Ai's own growing arrogance in his correspondence with Sima. Zhong Hui, skilled in forgery, secretly intercepted and edited a report from Deng Ai to the Wei imperial court to exaggerate Deng Ai's arrogance, while simultaneously submitting a report of his own to express suspicion of Deng Ai; he also destroyed a letter from Sima Zhao to Deng Ai in a further effort to alienate the latter. (Note: (世語曰：會善效人書，於劒閣要艾章表白事，皆易其言，令辭指悖傲，多自矜伐。又毀文王報書，手作以疑之也。) Shiyu annotation in Sanguozhi vol. 28.)

In early 264, Sima Zhao issued an edict granting Zhong Hui the position of Minister of the Interior and ordering Zhong Hui to capture Deng Ai to be brought to the Wei capital, Luoyang, to account for his conduct. Wei Guan was ordered to arrest Deng Ai and his son Deng Zhong on Zhong Hui's command. Zhong Hui hoped that Wei Guan would be killed doing this, which would strongly back up the false accusations against Deng Ai; however, Wei Guan surprised Deng Ai in the night after Deng Ai's troops laid down their arms in deference to Sima Zhao's edict; Deng Ai was successfully captured, after which he was imprisoned in a cart. (Note: (會內有異志，因鄧艾承制專事，密白艾有反狀，於是詔書檻車徵艾。司馬文王懼艾或不從命，勑會並進軍成都，監軍衞瓘在會前行，以文王手筆令宣喻艾軍，艾軍皆釋仗，遂收艾入檻車。) Sanguozhi vol. 28.)

However, at the same time, Sima Zhao personally led an army out of Luoyang with Jia Chong towards Chengdu. As Sima Zhao moved to lead his forces to station at Chang'an, Shao Ti told Sima that there was no need for him to go to Chang'an because Zhong Hui was capable of arresting Deng Ai on his own since he had five to six times more troops than Deng. Sima Zhao replied, "Have you forgotten what you said previously? Why are you asking me not to go now? Please keep secret what we spoke about. I treat people with trust and respect. As long as they remain loyal to me, I will not doubt them. Jia Chong recently asked me, 'Are you suspicious of Zhong Hui?' I replied, 'If I send you on a mission today, do you think I doubt you?' He could not respond to my reply. Everything will be settled when I arrive in Chang'an." (Note: (及會白鄧艾不軌，文王將西，悌復曰：「鍾會所統，五六倍於鄧艾，但可勑會取艾，不足自行。」文王曰：「卿忘前時所言邪，而更云可不須行乎？雖爾，此言不可宣也。我要自當以信義待人，但人不當負我，我豈可先人生心哉！近日賈護軍問我，言：『頗疑鍾會不？』我荅言：『如今遣卿行，寧可復疑卿邪？』賈亦無以易我語也。我到長安，則自了矣。」軍至長安，會果已死，咸如所策。) Sanguozhi vol. 28.)

Zhong Hui immediately became acting commander of Wei forces in the former Shu territory, at which point his hubris reached its height. Zhong Hui outlined a plan to capture Luoyang:

1. Jiang Wei would lead a vanguard force out of the Xie Valley (斜谷) to attack the city of Chang'an. Zhong Hui would follow behind with the main army and provide support.
2. After capturing Chang'an, the army would be split into two groups – infantry and cavalry. The infantry would sail along the Wei and Yellow rivers towards Meng Ford (孟津) near Luoyang while the cavalry would ride towards Luoyang on land. Zhong Hui estimated that the journey would take five days.
3. The infantry and cavalry would rendezvous outside Luoyang and attack the city together. (Note: (會所憚惟艾，艾旣禽而會尋至，獨統大衆，威震西土。自謂功名蓋世，不可復為人下，加猛將銳卒皆在己手，遂謀反。欲使姜維等皆將蜀兵出斜谷，會自將大衆隨其後。旣至長安，令騎士從陸道，步兵從水道順流浮渭入河，以為五日可到孟津，與騎會洛陽，一旦天下可定也。) Sanguozhi vol. 28.)

== The rebellion ==
Zhong Hui received a letter from Sima Zhao, which read: "I fear Deng Ai might not submit. I have ordered Jia Chong to lead 10,000 infantry and cavalry into the Xie Valley and station at Yuecheng. I will lead 100,000 troops to garrison at Chang'an. We will be meeting each other soon." After reading the letter, Zhong Hui was shocked and he told his close aides, "When His Excellency ordered me to arrest Deng Ai, he knew I was capable of accomplishing the task alone. However, now, since he has brought his troops here, he must be suspecting me. We should take action quickly. If we succeed, the Empire is ours. If we fail, we can retreat to Shu Han and do as Liu Bei did before us. It is widely known that my plans have never failed once since the Shouchun rebellions. How can I be content with such fame?" (Note: (會得文王書云：「恐鄧艾或不就徵，今遣中護軍賈充將步騎萬人徑入斜谷，屯樂城，吾自將十萬屯長安，相見在近。」會得書，驚呼所親語之曰：「但取鄧艾，相國知我能獨辦之；今來大重，必覺我異矣，便當速發。事成，可得天下；不成，退保蜀漢，不失作劉備也。我自淮南以來，畫無遣策，四海所共知也。我欲持此安歸乎！」) Sanguozhi vol. 28.) Having heard this news, Zhong Hui then openly declared his rebellion with the likes of Jiang Wei as Zhong Hui's chief general.

Zhong Hui arrived in Chengdu on 29 February 264. The following day, he summoned all the high-ranking officers and former Shu officers to the old Shu imperial court in the name of holding a memorial service for the recently deceased Empress Dowager Guo. During the service, he showed them a forgery he had made of an imperial decree claiming to have been issued by the empress dowager before her death. In the decree, Empress Dowager Guo wanted all those who were loyal to Wei to rise up against Sima Zhao and remove him from power. Zhong Hui sought the officers' opinions, asked them to sign on a list if they agreed to carry out the empress dowager's dying wish, and then instructed his close aides to take over command of the various military units. He then had all the officers detained in their respective offices with the doors shut, and ordered the gates of the city to be closed and tightly guarded. (Note: (會以五年正月十五日至，其明日，悉請護軍、郡守、牙門騎督以上及蜀之故官，為太后發喪於蜀朝堂。矯太后遺詔，使會起兵廢文王，皆班示坐上人，使下議訖，書版署置，更使所親信代領諸軍。所請群官，悉閉著益州諸曹屋中，城門宮門皆閉，嚴兵圍守。) Sanguozhi vol. 28.)

One of Zhong Hui's officers was Qiu Jian (丘建), a former subordinate of the officer Hu Lie, who had recommended Qiu Jian to Sima Zhao. Zhong Hui favoured and regarded Qiu Jian highly and requested for him to be transferred to his unit. Qiu Jian sympathised with Hu Lie, who was detained alone inside a room, so he approached Zhong Hui and said that each of the detained officers should have a servant to attend to their personal needs, to which Zhong Hui agreed. Hu Lie lied to his servant and wrote a letter to his sons, in which he claimed he heard from Qiu Jian that Zhong Hui was planning to purge the officers not from his own unit by luring them into a trap and killing them. The rumour spread among all the detained officers. When Zhong Hui's men received news about the rumour, they suggested to their superior to execute all the officers holding the rank of "Cavalry Commandant of the Standard" (牙門騎督) and above and absorb the troops from Deng Ai's officers into the rebel forces. Jiang Wei particularly supported this, a personal ploy to weaken the Wei forces preceding a resurrection of the Shu state, and Zhong Hui, though doubtful, agreed to the plan. (Note: (會帳下督丘建本屬胡烈，烈薦之文王，會請以自隨，任愛之。建愍烈獨坐，啟會，使聽內一親兵出取飲食，諸牙門隨例各內一人。烈紿語親兵及疏與其子曰：「丘建密說消息，會已作大坑，白棓數千，欲悉呼外兵入，人賜白㡊，拜為散將，以次棓殺坑中。」諸牙門親兵亦咸說此語，一夜傳相告，皆徧。或謂會：「可盡殺牙門騎督以上。」會猶豫未決。) Sanguozhi vol. 28.)

== Downfall ==
Around noon on 3 March 264, Hu Lie's son Hu Yuan, his siblings, and his father's subordinates started beating the drums and their soldiers followed suit. After that, they rushed towards the city gates in a disorderly manner because they had no one to lead them. Wei Guan and Qiu Jian joined the uprising against Zhong Hui. Around the time, Jiang Wei was collecting his armour and weapons from Zhong Hui when they heard shouting and received news that a fire had broken out. Moments later, it was reported that many soldiers were crowding near the city gates. Zhong Hui was surprised and he asked Jiang Wei, "Those men are causing trouble. What should we do?" Jiang Wei replied, "Kill them." Zhong Hui then ordered his men to kill the officers who were still detained in their offices. Some of the officers used pieces of furniture to block the doors. Zhong Hui's men rammed the doors but could not force them open. A while later, there were reports of people climbing up the city gates on ladders and of people setting fire to buildings. Chaos broke out and arrows were fired in all directions. The detained officers broke out of captivity, regrouped with their men, and attacked Zhong Hui and Jiang Wei. Zhong Hui and Jiang Wei fought the mutinying soldiers and slew about five or six of them, but were eventually overwhelmed and killed by them. Zhong Hui was 40 years old (by East Asian age reckoning) when he died. Hundreds of lives were lost in the mutiny. (Note: (十八日日中，烈軍兵與烈兒雷鼓出門，諸軍兵不期皆鼓譟出，曾無督促之者，而爭先赴城。時方給與姜維鎧杖，白外有匈匈聲，似失火，有頃，白兵走向城。會驚，謂維曰：「兵來似欲作惡，當云何？」維曰：「但當擊之耳。」會遣兵悉殺所閉諸牙門郡守，內人共舉机以柱門，兵斫門，不能破。斯須，門外倚梯登城，或燒城屋，蟻附亂進，矢下如雨，牙門、郡守各緣屋出，與其卒兵相得。姜維率會左右戰，手殺五六人，衆旣格斬維，爭赴殺會。會時年四十，將士死者數百人。) Sanguozhi vol. 28.)

By the time Sima Zhao reached Chang'an, Zhong Hui had already been killed in the mutiny, just as Sima Zhao foresaw. (Note: (及會白鄧艾不軌，文王將西，悌復曰：「鍾會所統，五六倍於鄧艾，但可勑會取艾，不足自行。」文王曰：「卿忘前時所言邪，而更云可不須行乎？雖爾，此言不可宣也。我要自當以信義待人，但人不當負我，我豈可先人生心哉！近日賈護軍問我，言：『頗疑鍾會不？』我荅言：『如今遣卿行，寧可復疑卿邪？』賈亦無以易我語也。我到長安，則自了矣。」軍至長安，會果已死，咸如所策。) Sanguozhi vol. 28.) Wei Guan, having taken control of Zhong Hui's forces, subsequently ordered the execution of Deng Ai and Deng Zhong for fear that they would seek retaliation against Wei Guan for his involvement in their capture. Following these events, Wei Guan returned to service under Sima Zhao, eventually serving under his son Sima Yan and the Jin dynasty, which he founded soon after.

== In popular culture ==
The rebellion is featured in Chapter 119 of the historical novel Romance of the Three Kingdoms by Luo Guanzhong. A popular anecdote included in the novel concerning the rebellion is that when Jiang Wei was killed, his body was mutilated to expose the gall bladder (the traditional source of courage in Chinese culture,) which had swollen to a huge size, implying reckless foolishness — it is described with a phrase now used as a proverb: "膽大如斗 (gallbladder as big as a dou)". His gallbladder was said to have been buried separately from his body, and a tomb stands in its purported burial place.
