= Xu Zhi =

Chinese Cao Wei general (died 254)

- Traditional Chinese: 徐質
- Simplified Chinese: 徐质
Transcriptions
Standard Mandarin
- Hanyu Pinyin: Xú Zhì

Xu Zhi (died 254) was a military general of the state of Cao Wei during the Three Kingdoms period of China. He participated in a battle against an invading army from Wei's rival state, Shu Han, led by the Shu general Jiang Wei. His name is sometimes incorrectly romanised as Xu Zi.

== Life ==
In 254, the Wei-appointed official in charge of Didao County defected to Shu and surrendered, after which the Shu troops under Jiang Wei's command entered Wei territory without being challenged until they reached Xiangwu (襄武). There, Xu Zhi organised the local defences to resist the Shu invasion. During the ensuing battle, Zhang Ni while leading the vanguard of the Shu forces was killed though those he killed and injured were also numerous. Xu Zhi, himself was killed and defeated by Jiang Wei with the rest of the Wei forces retreating. The victorious Shu forces then occupied three counties – Didao, Heguan (河關; in the vicinity of present-day Dingxi, Gansu) and Lintao – and forced the residents to relocate to Shu-controlled territory.

== In Romance of the Three Kingdoms ==
In the 14th-century historical novel Romance of the Three Kingdoms, Xu Zhi volunteers to lead the Wei vanguard to engage Jiang Wei in battle. The two armies encounter each other at Dong Village (董亭) and get into their respective formations. Xu Zhi charges out of the Wei formation and duels with the Shu general Liao Hua. Soon after, Liao Hua takes advantage of a feint and retreats. Zhang Yi continues the duel against Xu Zhi but retreats as well after a few rounds. Xu Zhi then leads his troops on a charge and defeats the enemy. Later, Xu Zhi is caught in a surprise attack led by Liao Hua and Zhang Yi. Though his force is wiped out, Xu Zhi manages to escape alive; he ultimately falls into an ambush and meets his end at the hands of Jiang Wei's men.

== See also ==
- Lists of people of the Three Kingdoms
