= Zhaohua, Guangyuan =

Zhaohua 昭化区
- District
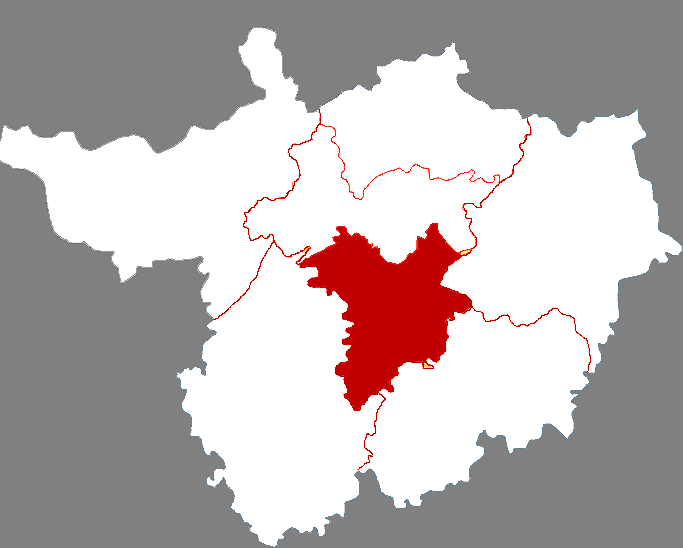
- Zhaohua in Guangyuan

- Guangyuan in Sichuan
- Coordinates: 32°19′23″N 105°57′50″E
- Country: China
- Province: Sichuan
- Prefecture-level city: Guangyuan

Area
  - Total: 1,435 km^{2} (554 sq mi)

Population (2020)
  - Total: 134,202
  - Density: 93.52/km^{2} (242.2/sq mi)
- Time zone: UTC+8 (China Standard)

Zhaohua District (Chinese: 昭化区; pinyin: Zhāohuà Qū) is a district of the city of Guangyuan, Sichuan Province, China. It was formerly called Yuanba District until 12 March 2013.

During the Shu kingdom era it was known as Jiameng County (Chinese: 葭萌县), the capital of the Juhou state (Chinese: 苴侯国). Established in 285 BC, it served as a base for Liu Bei before he captured Chengdu. He renamed Jiameng to Hanshou (Chinese: 汉寿) in 217 AD. In 280 AD the name was changed to Jinshou County (Chinese: 晋寿县). In 347, Jiange County was split off. It was named to Yiguang County (Chinese: 益光县) in 925 and to Zhaohua in 972.

== Administrative divisions ==
Zhaohua District comprises 12 towns:

- Yuanba 元坝镇
- Weizi 卫子镇
- Wangjia 王家镇
- Motan 磨滩镇
- Bolingou 柏林沟镇
- Taigong 太公镇
- Hutiao 虎跳镇
- Hongyan 红岩镇
- Zhaohua 昭化镇
- Qingniu 青牛镇
- Shejian 射箭镇
- Qingshui 清水镇
