= Battle of Didao =

Battle between states of Shu Han and Cao Wei (255)

- Part of Jiang Wei's Northern Expeditions
Date	c. September – 11 November 255
Location	Gansu Province, China
Result	Cao Wei victory

Belligerents
Cao Wei	Shu Han

Commanders and leaders
Chen Tai; Deng Ai; Hu Fen	Jiang Wei; Xiahou Ba; Zhang Yi

Battle of Didao
- Traditional Chinese: 狄道之戰
- Simplified Chinese: 狄道之战
Transcriptions
Standard Mandarin
- Hanyu Pinyin: Dídào Zhī Zhàn

Battle of Taoxi
- Traditional Chinese: 洮西之戰
- Simplified Chinese: 洮西之战
- Literal meaning: Battle at the west of the Tao River
Transcriptions
Standard Mandarin
- Hanyu Pinyin: Táoxī Zhī Zhàn

The Battle of Didao, also known as the Battle of Taoxi, was fought between the states of Shu Han and Cao Wei in 255 during the Three Kingdoms period in China. The battle concluded with a Wei victory.

== Prelude ==
In 255, Shu general Jiang Wei decided to take advantage of the death of Wei regent Sima Shi by launching another campaign against Wei. The invasion force was one of the largest Jiang Wei had gathered in his Northern Expeditions, totalling at least 30,000 men, and included commanders such as Xiahou Ba and Zhang Yi. It is worth noting that both Xiahou Ba and Zhang Yi held higher appointments than Jiang Wei in administrating civil affairs, but Jiang Wei was in command instead because it was a military campaign. Xiahou Ba was a relative of the Shu imperial family (both of his nieces were married to Shu emperor Liu Shan). Zhang Yi was considered more senior than Jiang Wei and Xiahou Ba as he served Shu's founding emperor Liu Bei, while Jiang and Xiahou only joined Shu after Liu Bei's death. Between 18 September and 17 October, Jiang Wei's army took Fuhan (枹罕; located northeast of present-day Linxia County, Gansu), and advanced towards Didao (狄道; present-day Lintao County, Gansu).

The newly appointed Wei Inspector of Yong Province, Wang Jing, immediately notified his direct superior, General Who Subdues the West, Chen Tai, claiming that the enemy appeared to attack simultaneously on three fronts, targeting Mount Qi (祁山), Shiying (石营), and Jincheng (金城; present-day Lanzhou, Gansu), and suggested that they should engage the enemy on those fronts. Wang Jing volunteered to lead an army to face the enemy at Shiying, and proposed having another force to defend Mount Qi. Meanwhile, Wei armies in Liang Province should be deployed to Baohan to check the enemy's advance towards Jincheng. Chen Tai was dubious about this initial intelligence since it was highly unlikely that Shu could rally such a huge army for the campaign Wang Jing perceived. Nonetheless, the Shu invasion force was one of the largest so far, and the Wei defenders could not afford to split forces. Furthermore, Wei armies in Liang Province would not be fully utilized if they were deployed elsewhere, since they would be fighting on unfamiliar terrain. Hence, Chen Tai replied to Wang Jing that they must further carefully analyse Jiang Wei's move because it was unlikely that the enemy could afford to split their forces on different fronts, and Wei must concentrate its forces to achieve absolute numerical superiority over the enemy. Wang Jing was ordered to focus on defending Didao and refrain from engaging the enemy, while waiting for the arrival of reinforcements. Chen Tai asked the Wei imperial court for reinforcements, while he led a relief army towards Chencang (陳倉; located east of present-day Baoji, Shaanxi).

== Battle ==
=== Wei defeat at Gu Pass ===
Wang Jing, with virtually no military experience, had gravely underestimated the enemy and erroneously believed that the Shu army would be tired after the prolonged march, and it would be better not to provide them with any chance to rest and regroup, but to defeat them early in a pre-emptive strike. Wang Jing was confident that he would score a decisive victory because of his numerical superiority, and because unlike the Shu army whose supply line was overstretched, he had no such logistic problems. Therefore, Wang Jing ignored Chen Tai's order to remain in Didao, and instead led his force to Gu Pass (故關) on the upstream of the Tao River. Gu Pass is located to the north of present-day Lintao County, Gansu, and it is on the western bank of the Tao River. In October 255, both sides clashed on the western bank of the Tao River, and Wei suffered a disastrous defeat: the number of soldiers drowned in the Tao River in their attempts to escape alone totalled more than 10,000, and most of Wang Jing's troops were lost. Wang Jing was forced to lead his remaining 10,000 troops back to Didao in the south after crossing the Tao River, and regroup behind the safety of the city walls. The battle on the western bank of Tao River, known as the Battle of Gu Pass (also known as the Battle of Taoxi), was the greatest victory Jiang Wei had achieved in his northern expeditions, and it was also his last.

After the initial victory, Zhang Yi accurately realized the supply problems Shu faced, and suggested withdrawal to Jiang Wei. Jiang Wei, wanting to ride the momentum of his victory to take Didao, angrily turned down the suggestion and besieged Didao. As news of Wang Jing venturing out to engage Jiang Wei reached Chen Tai, he immediately and accurately predicted that Wei would suffer a defeat and thus ordered his cavalry to the rescue, and he would lead the infantry himself to follow. Chen Tai also wrote an urgent message to the Wei imperial court for additional reinforcements. When the news of disaster reached the Wei capital, Luoyang, the imperial court was worried that Chen Tai alone would not be able to salvage the situation. Changshui Colonel Deng Ai, who had just arrived in Luoyang, was appointed Acting General Who Stabilizes the West, and was sent to assist Chen Tai. As soon as Deng Ai left Luoyang, Wei regent Sima Zhao also put his uncle, Grand Commandant Sima Fu, in charge of Guanzhong to help coordinate logistics for the war effort.

=== Wei strategies to counter Shu ===
When the news of the siege of Didao reached Chen Tai, he initially believed that the city would not fall easily, but the reinforcements he sent would definitely not be enough, and so he asked the Wei imperial court for more. Most officials in the court, however, were worried that after the disastrous defeat Wang Jing would not last until the reinforcements arrived, and the Shu army would have absolute geographical advantage after taking the walled city. They further predicted the four commanderies in western Gansu would be lost for sure, and concluded that it would be better to take more time to gather a much greater army to fight a prolonged war to regain the control of the region instead of wasting resources on a seemingly impossible task. Sima Zhao brushed such concerns aside, pointing out that if even Zhuge Liang could not achieve the goal of taking the four commanderies in western Gansu in his Northern Expeditions when he was alive, Jiang Wei would certainly not be able to achieve the same. It would not be easy to immediately take Didao and the invading enemy would soon run out supplies, and thus Chen Tai's request for immediate reinforcements was absolutely correct. As Chen Tai led his force to Shanggui (上邽; present-day Tianshui, Gansu), other reinforcements including those led by Deng Ai, Hu Fen (胡奮), and Wang Mi (王秘) also arrived. During a military council, Deng Ai claimed that after Wang Jing's devastating defeat in which most of their crack troops in the region were lost, the morale of the enemy was extremely high while that of their own troops was low, and that the reinforcements had been gathered in haste after the defeat, so it was difficult to achieve victory at this time. It would be wise to sacrifice some local interests in order to save the overall interest – it might be better to leave Wang Jing to fend for himself, wait until the enemy became tired and less alert, and then launch a counteroffensive.

Chen Tai opposed Deng Ai's proposal which everyone else had agreed to. Chen Tai reasoned that Jiang Wei's aim was to fight a quick battle because he did not have enough supplies for a prolonged struggle. Wang Jing was supposed to avoid fighting the invading enemy until they had exhausted their supplies, and then counterattack only when reinforcements had arrived. Instead, Wang Jing did exactly what Jiang Wei had hoped and rushed to battle. Had Jiang Wei ridden on his initial victory and continue eastward to take important grain production regions of Wei, he would have had a chance to disrupt Guanzhong, which was truly the real threat. In fact, Jiang Wei might even have had a chance to take both Yong and Liang provinces if he had gone for them, and gathered the support of minorities in the north and northwest. Instead, Jiang Wei had made a grave military blunder in besieging Didao, which would risk exhausting the limited supplies that he had. Attempting to take the city was the worst choice because it would take time to make preparations, while at the meantime, the defenders had their backs against the wall and would fight to the death to defend the city. This would provide an excellent opportunity to repel the invading Shu army because Wei reinforcements enjoyed the geographical advantage of being stationed on high ground in the mountains. Finally, Chen Tai reminded his subordinates that the high morale of the enemy would not last long once their supplies begun to run out, and everyone concurred with Chen Tai's ideas. Chen Tai subsequently divided his force into three armies and pushed towards western Gansu, bypassing Jiang Wei's force, eventually reaching the mountains to the southeast of Didao.

=== Arrival of reinforcements at Didao ===
As the siege of Didao continued, the supply problem begun to take its toll on the overstretched Shu force, and there was more bad news for Jiang Wei. The news of Wei reinforcements arrived from Jincheng on the upstream of the Tao River, while at the same time, Chen Tai's reinforcements bypassed Gaocheng Ridge (高城嶺; located northwest of present-day Weiyuan County, Gansu), and took up positions in the mountains to the southeast of the besieged Didao. After several failed attempts attacking the mountain ridge, it was obvious to Shu commanders that their hungry soldiers could not dislodge the Wei reinforcements. The reinforcements in the mountains just outside the city wall established a link with the city by means of smoke and drums, and the defenders' morale was greatly boosted. Chen Tai was well aware that despite the numerical advantage and newly boosted morale, the Wei force was not in a position to counterattack. Instead, Chen Tai deployed a clever tactic by releasing news of a planned counteroffensive in which the Wei force would attack the Shu force from both sides. With supplies running out, Jiang Wei was forced to concede defeat by retreating to Zhongti (鐘堤; located south of present-day Lintao County, Gansu) at the downstream of the Tao River, to the south of Didao. The battle therefore was concluded with a Wei victory. As Wang Jing opened the city gate to welcome Chen Tai, he cordially thanked the latter, revealing that he only had enough food for ten more days of siege, and the city would definitely fall if the reinforcements had failed to arrive in time. After re-supplying the city and reorganising the defence, Chen Tai and his force returned to Shanggui.

== Aftermath ==
Although successfully repelling the invading Shu army led by Jiang Wei, Wei had suffered a terrible loss. The Wei emperor Cao Mao issued an imperial decree in which he ordered the local civilian officials and military officers to devote their sources fully to the relief effort. The military draft and tax levied on the local populace were waived for a year. Cao Mao soon issued another imperial decree to further boost the morale and the support of the local populace by granting amnesty to the local family members left behind by those defected to Shu. Merely half a month after his second decree, Cao Mao issued a third decree, in which he ordered Chen Tai and Deng Ai to commit all of their forces to fish out all of the remaining cadavers of Wei soldiers in the Tao River, and bury them with other killed in the battle. It was more than hundred days after the end of the battle, and the devastation was so great that many of the battle dead had yet to be properly buried.

For his brilliant achievement, Chen Tai was recalled to Luoyang to be promoted to Imperial Secretariat, and the position of General Who Subdues the West was succeeded by Sima Wang. Deng Ai was no longer in an acting appointment, but now officially General Who Pacifies the West (安西將軍), and he was put in charge of both Yong and Liang provinces. Wang Jing, who was the cause of the initial Wei defeat and subsequent devastation, was reassigned to another position in the capital and the vacant position of Inspector of Yong he left behind was filled by Deng Ai's subordinate Zhuge Xu (諸葛緒).

== Order of battle ==
Wei forces

- General Who Subdues the West (征西將軍) Chen Tai
  - Acting General Who Pacifies the West (代安西將軍) Deng Ai
  - Inspector of Yong State (雍州刺史) Wang Jing (王經)
  - General Hu Fen (胡奮)
  - General Wang Mi (王秘)

Shu forces

- General of the Guards (衛將軍) Jiang Wei
  - General of Chariots and Cavalry (車騎將軍) Xiahou Ba
  - Senior General Who Subdues the West (征西大將軍) Zhang Yi
