= 264 =

264 in various calendars
- Gregorian calendar: 264; CCLXIV
- Ab urbe condita: 1017
- Assyrian calendar: 5014
- Balinese saka calendar: 185–186
- Bengali calendar: −330 – −329
- Berber calendar: 1214
- Buddhist calendar: 808
- Burmese calendar: −374
- Byzantine calendar: 5772–5773
- Chinese calendar: 癸未年 (Water Goat); 2961 or 2754 — to — 甲申年 (Wood Monkey); 2962 or 2755
- Coptic calendar: −20 – −19
- Discordian calendar: 1430
- Ethiopian calendar: 256–257
- Hebrew calendar: 4024–4025
- Hindu calendars
- Vikram Samvat: 320–321
- Shaka Samvat: 185–186
- Kali Yuga: 3364–3365
- Holocene calendar: 10264
- Iranian calendar: 358 BP – 357 BP
- Islamic calendar: 369 BH – 368 BH
- Javanese calendar: 143–144
- Julian calendar: 264; CCLXIV
- Korean calendar: 2597
- Minguo calendar: 1648 before ROC 民前1648年
- Nanakshahi calendar: −1204
- Seleucid era: 575/576 AG
- Thai solar calendar: 806–807
- Tibetan calendar: ཆུ་མོ་ལུག་ལོ་ (female Water-Sheep); 390 or 9 or −763 — to — ཤིང་ཕོ་སྤྲེ་ལོ་ (male Wood-Monkey); 391 or 10 or −762

Year 264 (CCLXIV) was a leap year starting on Friday of the Julian calendar. At the time, it was known as the Year of the Consulship of Gallienus and Saturninus (or, less frequently, year 1017 Ab urbe condita). The denomination 264 for this year has been used since the early medieval period, when the Anno Domini calendar era became the prevalent method in Europe for naming years.

== Events ==
=== By place ===
==== Asia ====
- March 1–3 – Zhong Hui's Rebellion in China is quelled.
- Sima Zhao, regent of the Chinese state of Cao Wei, styles himself the "King of Jin", the penultimate step before usurpation.
- Sun Hao succeeds Sun Xiu as emperor of the Chinese state of Eastern Wu.

== Deaths ==
- Zhong Hui, Chinese philosopher
- March 3
  - Jiang Wei (or Boyue), Chinese general and regent (b. 202)
  - Zhang Yi (or Bogong), Chinese general and politician
- September 3 – Sun Xiu (Jing of Wu), Chinese emperor (b. 235)
- Deng Ai (or Shizai), Chinese general and politician (b. 197)
- Guo (or Mingyuan), Chinese empress of the Cao Wei state
- Liao Hua (or Yuanjian), Chinese general and politician
- Liu Xuan, Chinese prince of the Shu Han state (b. 224)
- Puyang Xing (or Ziyuan), Chinese official and chancellor
- Zong Yu (or Deyan), Chinese general and politician

Valerian (emperor) (b.199)
