= Ju Fu =

3rd century Shu Han military officer

- 句扶

General of the Left (左將軍)
- In office ?–?
- Monarch: Liu Shan

Personal details
- Born: Unknown Bazhong, Sichuan
- Died: Unknown
- Occupation: General
- Courtesy name: Xiaoxing (孝興)
- Peerage: Marquis of Dangqu Village (宕渠侯)

Ju Fu (fl. third century), courtesy name Xiaoxing, was a military officer of the state of Shu Han in the Three Kingdoms period of China. His name is sometimes rendered as Gou Fu.

== Life ==
Information about Ju Fu is recorded at the end of Wang Ping's biography in the Records of the Three Kingdoms (Sanguozhi), seemingly because they were from the same commandery and shared a similar reputation.

Ju Fu was born in Hanchang, Baxi Commandery (巴西郡), which is present-day Bazhong, Sichuan and may have been a foreigner from the local tribes in the area. As a warrior, he was known to be loyal and brave. Moreover, he is also described as lenient and generous. He made several achievements in battles. Therefore, his reputation, deeds and rank were second to those of Wang Ping. The highest position he reached was General of the Left (左將軍). He was also enfeoffed as Marquis of Dangqu (宕渠侯).

Chang Qu, who wrote extensively about the history of the Sichuan region in the Chronicles of Huayang (Huayang Guo Zhi), also recorded that during the late times of Shu Han when veteran officers, Zhang Yi and Liao Hua respectively served as Left and Right General of Chariots and Cavalry, there was a saying among the common people of Shu: "Before we had Wang Ping and Ju Fu, now we have Zhang Yi and Liao Hua." indicating that just like Liao Hua and Zhang Yi careers mirror themselves, so were Ju Fu and Wang Ping's careers.

== See also ==
- Lists of people of the Three Kingdoms
