= Wang Shen =

Wang Shen may refer to:

- Wang Shen (Three Kingdoms) (?–266), or Wang Chen, Chinese politician, official, military general, and historian of Cao Wei
- Wang Shen (Song dynasty) (c. 1036 – c. 1093), Chinese poet, painter, and calligrapher of the Song dynasty
