= Han Invasion =

Han Invasion may refer to:

- Zhuge Liang's Northern Expeditions (228-234)
- Jiang Wei's Northern Expeditions (247-262)
