= Shu's Northern Expeditions =

The northern expeditions of Shu can be justified by two differing scenarios:

- Zhuge Liang's Northern Expeditions; 228-234
- Jiang Wei's Northern Expeditions; 247-262
