= Wang Ye (Three Kingdoms) =

3rd-century Chinese Cao Wei state politician

- 王業

Left Supervisor of the Masters of Writing (尚書左僕射)
- In office 271 – 270s (Note: In Emperor Wu's annals in Book of Jin, after Wang Ye, the next known Left Supervisor was Lu Qin, grandson of Lu Zhi, who died while holding the post in April 278. Thus, Wang Ye must have left the post some time in the 270s.)
- Monarch: Emperor Wu of Jin

Central Protector of the Army (中護軍)
- In office February 266 or after – 271
- Monarch: Emperor Wu of Jin

Regular Mounted Attendant (散騎常侍)
- In office ? – 265
- Monarch: Cao Mao / Cao Huan

Personal details
- Born: Unknown Changde, Hunan
- Died: Unknown
- Children: Unknown (Note: Wang Hong's and Wang Bi's father was another person with the same name. Per a Bowu Ji annotation in vol.28 of Sanguozhi, this Wang Ye's courtesy name was Zhangxu (长绪), a clansman of Wang Can (and his eventual heir), and a maternal grandson of Liu Biao.)
- Occupation: Politician

Wang Ye (fl.260–271) was a Chinese politician of the state of Cao Wei during the Three Kingdoms period of China. He served under the Jin dynasty (266–420) after Cao Wei was replaced by the Jin dynasty.

== Life ==
Wang Ye was from Wuling Commandery (武陵郡), which is around present-day Changde, Hunan. He started his career as an official in the state of Cao Wei in the Three Kingdoms period and served as a Regular Mounted Attendant (散騎常侍). In 260, the Wei emperor Cao Mao secretly summoned Wang Chen, Wang Jing and Wang Ye to discuss a plan to remove the regent Sima Zhao from power. However, Wang Chen and Wang Ye refused to participate in the plot and instead secretly reported it to Sima Zhao. Cao Mao failed in his coup against Sima Zhao and ended up being killed in June.

Wang Ye continued serving under the Western Jin, which replaced the Cao Wei state after Sima Zhao's son, Sima Yan, usurped the throne from the last Wei emperor Cao Huan. In the early years of Sima Yan's reign, Wang Ye was promoted to Central Protector of the Army (中護軍). (Note: This post is significant to the Sima clan as Sima Shi held this post during the Incident at the Gaoping Tombs.) On 10 April 271, Sima Yan appointed him and Sima Gui (司馬珪; son of Sima Fu) as the Left and Right Supervisors of the Masters of Writing respectively.

== See also ==
- Lists of people of the Three Kingdoms
