= Liao Hua =

Shu Han state general (died 264)

- 廖化
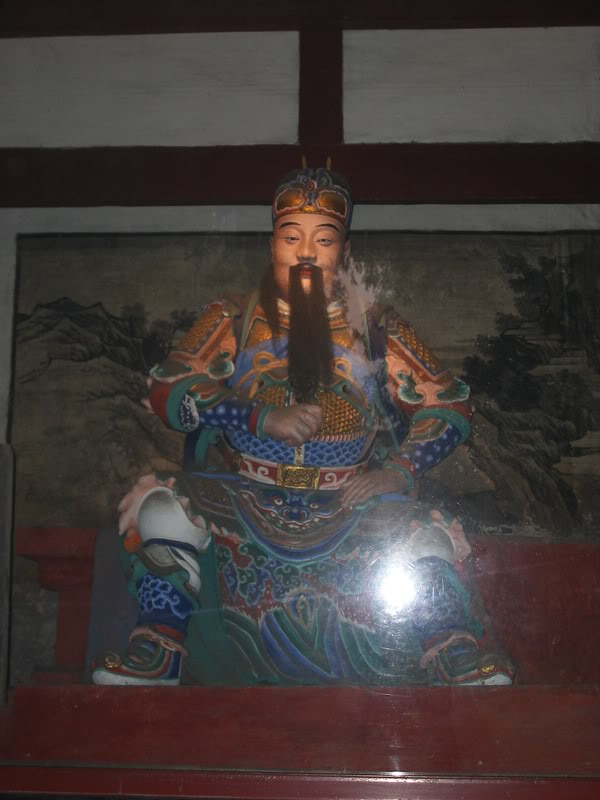
- A statue of Liao Hua in Chengdu, Sichuan. It was made in 1849.

Right General of Chariots and Cavalry (右車騎將軍)
- In office ?–?
- Monarch: Liu Shan

Inspector of Bing Province (并州刺史) (nominal)
- In office ?–?
- Monarch: Liu Shan

Administrator of Yidu (宜都太守)
- In office 221 – 223
- Monarch: Liu Bei
- Chancellor: Zhuge Liang

Personal details
- Born: Unknown Xiangyang, Hubei
- Died: 264 (aged 70s)
- Occupation: Military general, politician
- Courtesy name: Yuanjian (元儉)
- Peerage: Marquis of a Central District (中鄉侯)
- Original name: Liao Chun (廖淳)

Liao Hua (d. 264), courtesy name Yuanjian, originally named Liao Chun, was a Chinese military general and politician of the state of Shu Han during the Three Kingdoms period of China. Like Zhang Yi and Zong Yu, Liao was one of few officials who served the Shu-Han state throughout its entire existence.

== Early career as Guan Yu's subordinate ==
Liao Hua was from Xiangyang, Jing Province. He was a registrar (主簿) under Guan Yu, a general who served under the warlord Liu Bei and guarded Liu Bei's territories in Jing Province. In late 219, while Guan Yu was away at the Battle of Fancheng, Liu Bei's ally, Sun Quan, broke the Sun–Liu alliance by launching an invasion of Jing Province and conquering most of Liu Bei's territories in the province. Guan Yu was captured and executed by Sun Quan's forces. Liao Hua became a prisoner-of-war of Sun Quan, but he constantly thought of returning to Liu Bei's side, so he faked his own death and succeeded in deceiving his captors and escaping. He brought his elderly mother with him and headed west towards Yi Province (covering present-day Sichuan and Chongqing), where Liu Bei's domain was based.

== Career in Shu Han ==
In 221, Liu Bei declared himself emperor and established the state of Shu Han. Later that year, he launched a military campaign against Sun Quan to retake his lands in Jing Province and avenge Guan Yu. Liao Hua and his mother encountered the Shu army at Zigui County. Liu Bei was very pleased to see Liao Hua and he appointed the latter as the Administrator of Yidu Commandery (宜都郡; around present-day Yidu, Hubei). After Liu Bei died in 223, Liao Hua became an army adviser (參軍) under Zhuge Liang, the Imperial Chancellor of Shu. He was later assigned to be in charge of Guangwu Commandery (廣武郡; around present-day Yongdeng County, Gansu) and was subsequently promoted to Right General of Chariots and Cavalry (右車騎將軍). He was also appointed as the Inspector of Bing Province even though Bing Province was not under Shu's jurisdiction, and enfeoffed as a Marquis of a Central District (中鄉侯). He was known for his fiery personality and determination. His position in the Shu military was equivalent to Zhang Yi while higher than Zong Yu.

During September of the year 238, Liao Hua led his troops to attack the encampment where the Inspector of Yong Province (雍州刺史), at the time Guo Huai stationed along with the main Wei army of the region. In response, Guo Huai dispatched his subordinates Wang Yun (王赟) Administrator of Guangwei (廣魏) along with You Yi (游奕) Administrator of Nan'an (南安) to counter this offensive. The Wei commanders wanted to disperse their forces to encircle the Shu army and occupy the strategic points between the mountains to prevent them from escaping, however at the same time this strategy had the Wei army scattered with many of You Yi's camps exposed in a dangerous position. Liao Hua saw through this and quickly seized the opportunity to defeat them while they were still unprepared. You Yi's army was forced to retreat while Wang Yun was killed in battle by an arrow.

Liao Hua was critical of the Shu general Jiang Wei, who continued Zhuge Liang's aggressive foreign policy against Shu's rival state, Cao Wei, by launching a series of eleven campaigns to attack Cao Wei between 240 and 262. He participated in the third and fourth campaigns in 247 and 249 respectively. In 262, when Jiang Wei was about to embark on the eleventh campaign, Liao Hua remarked: "'One who does not refrain from using military force will end up burning himself.' This is Boyue (Jiang Wei)'s current situation. He is inferior to the enemy in terms of intelligence and military power, yet he keeps attacking them. How can he expect to overcome them? The events of today are exactly as described in this line from the Classic of Poetry: 'Why were these things not before me? Or why were they not after me?'"

== Life after the fall of Shu ==
In late 263, Shu's rival state, Cao Wei, launched a campaign to conquer Shu and succeeded in doing so within a year when the Shu emperor Liu Shan surrendered. After the fall of Shu, Liao Hua was ordered to move out of former Shu territory to the Wei capital Luoyang. He died of illness on the journey.

Liao Hua's birth year could not be determined because his age at the time of his death was not recorded in history. However, it could be deduced that he was in his 70s when he died: Around 261, when Zhuge Zhan took charge of affairs in the Shu imperial court, Liao Hua visited Zong Yu, who said: "Both of us are already above the age of 70, ..."

== Sao Mi Zhou ==
The Sao Mi Zhou (掃迷帚; literally The broom sweeping away superstitions), a novel written by a certain Zhuangzhe (壯者; literally "strong man") during the Qing dynasty, contained a saying about Liao Hua: "No great generals left in Shu, Liao Hua serves as the vanguard." (蜀中無大將，廖化作先鋒)

It can be interpreted as: Shu was so lacking in young talents in its twilight years that elderly Liao Hua (more than 70 years old at that time) had to lead the vanguard of the Shu army in battle. The proverb is to describe a situation that there is a lack of young talents in a group or company and hence, old but experienced people will have to take the responsibilities themselves.

However, it can also be understood to describe a situation in which a person who is seemingly unfit for a job is forced into doing it, but is willing to face what seems to be insurmountable odds against him/her. This interpretation can be criticized as Liao Hua was adept in military affairs and he was one of a few people who experienced the whole ups and downs of the Shu Han regime. He is regarded one of four cornerstones of the late Shu Han regime in the Hanzhong region, together first with Wang Ping and Ju Fu then with Zhang Yi (Bogong) and him.

== Romance of the Three Kingdoms ==
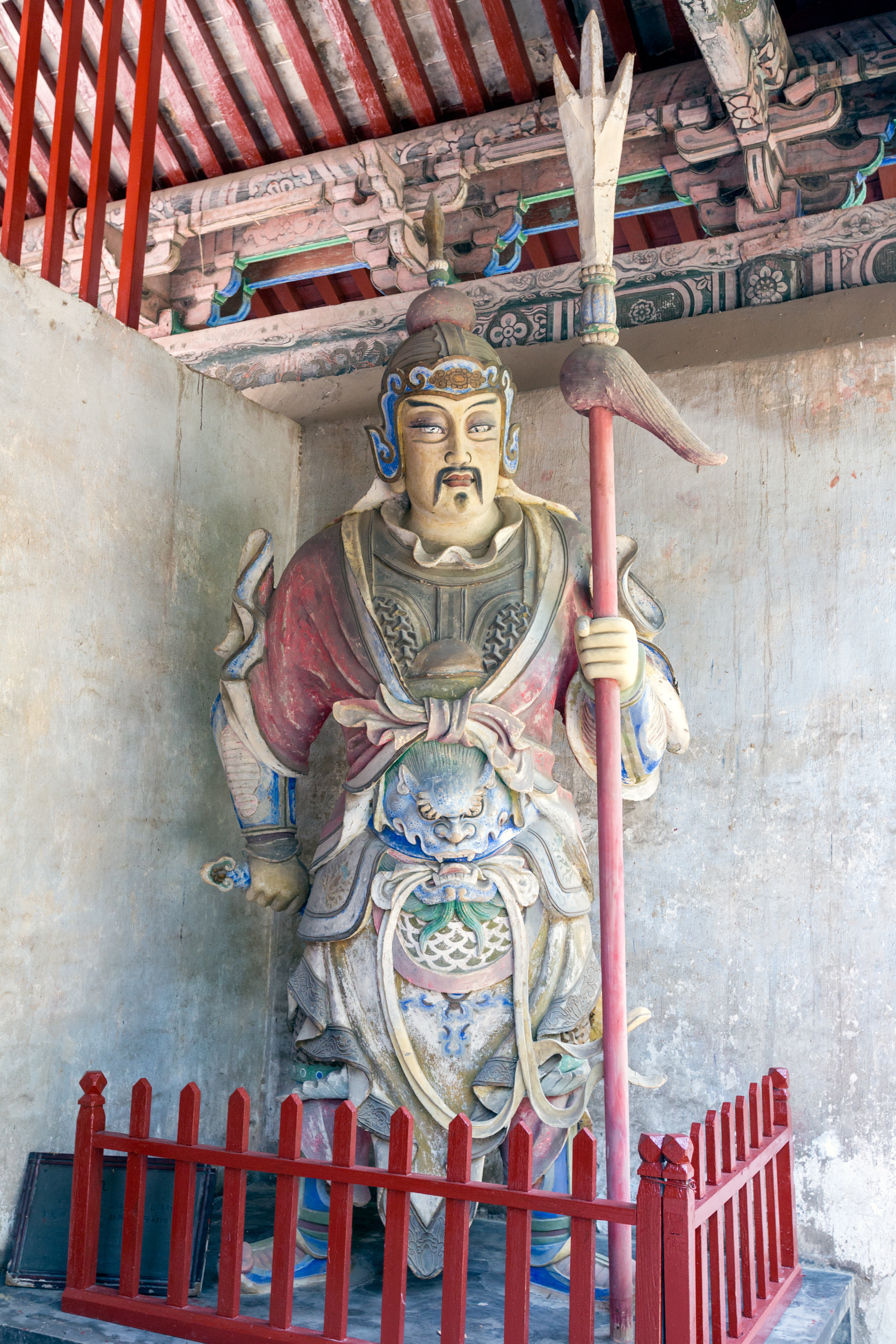
Statue of Liao Hua in the Emperor Guan Temple in Xuchang, Henan

The 14th-century historical novel Romance of the Three Kingdoms has a few stories about Liao Hua which are not found in historical records.

In Chapter 27, Liao Hua, a bandit chief and former Yellow Turban rebel, encountered Guan Yu while the latter was on a quest to reunite with Liu Bei. He was thanked by Guan Yu after rescuing Liu Bei's two kidnapped wives, Lady Gan and Lady Mi, from a fellow bandit named Du Yuan, but refused to accept him as a follower owing to his bandit roots. He would only reappear in Chapter 60, joining Guan Yu as he guarded Jing Province, and as Liu Bei was entering Yi Province.

In Chapter 73, Liao Hua took control of the vanguard during Guan Yu's march on Xiangyang. He successfully lured the enemy generals Cao Ren and Zhai Yuan out of their castle, allowing Guan Yu to seize it. In the subsequent Battle of Fancheng, Liao Hua was stationed at Sizhong where he was in mutual support of Guan Ping's encampment at Yancheng. When the enemy general Xu Huang captured both Sizhong and Yancheng, Liao Hua and Guan Ping fought their way south to join Guan Yu. When Guan Yu received news that Liu Bei's territories in Jing Province had been conquered by Sun Quan's army, he retreated to Maicheng (麥城) and was besieged there by Sun's forces. In Maicheng, Liao Hua volunteered to break out of the siege and seek reinforcements from Liu Feng and Meng Da in Shangyong (上庸). However, Liu Feng and Meng Da refused to help Guan Yu, so Liao Hua had no choice but to travel to Chengdu to report the situation to Liu Bei. By then, Guan Yu had been captured in an ambush and executed by Sun Quan.

In his later life and career, Liao Hua actively participated in the Shu campaigns (Zhuge Liang's Northern Expeditions and Jiang Wei's Northern Expeditions) against Wei. One of his most celebrated moments came in Chapter 103, when Sima Yi was retreating from Shangfang Valley. Liao Hua pursued the fleeing general into a dense forest and, being a proficient horseman, was able to catch up and get close enough to strike him down. However, when Sima Yi swerved around a tree, Liao Hua missed the shot and his sword became lodged into the wood, allowing Sima Yi to escape. During the chase, however, Sima Yi dropped his golden helmet. Liao Hua took the helmet and traveled back to Zhuge Liang who rewarded him with the first grade of merit for his attempt. This event angered Wei Yan who felt Liao Hua was being unfairly praised. Zhuge Liang noticed this but said nothing, leading to a mild distaste for Wei Yan's jealousy. The helmet was henceforth used as a means of mocking and provoking the Wei army. Following Zhuge Liang's death, Liao Hua moved up the ranks under Jiang Wei, eventually receiving the second-in-command military rank of General of Chariots and Cavalry. As Jiang Wei's senior general, Liao Hua was often tasked with the most important of duties, such as leading the vanguard and dueling enemy generals. Despite his steadfast loyalty to Shu, Liao Hua disagreed with Jiang Wei's constant invasions of Wei and his attempts to claim victory through overpowering numbers, believing these tactics to be a drain on resources and morale; he let it be known that he would run the military differently if he were in command, and this led to quarrels between Jiang Wei and himself. When Liu Shan eventually submitted to Wei in Chapter 119, Liao Hua succumbed to grief and died.

== See also ==
- Lists of people of the Three Kingdoms
