= 202 =

202 in various calendars
- Gregorian calendar: 202; CCII
- Ab urbe condita: 955
- Assyrian calendar: 4952
- Balinese saka calendar: 123–124
- Bengali calendar: −392 – −391
- Berber calendar: 1152
- Buddhist calendar: 746
- Burmese calendar: −436
- Byzantine calendar: 5710–5711
- Chinese calendar: 辛巳年 (Metal Snake); 2899 or 2692 — to — 壬午年 (Water Horse); 2900 or 2693
- Coptic calendar: −82 – −81
- Discordian calendar: 1368
- Ethiopian calendar: 194–195
- Hebrew calendar: 3962–3963
- Hindu calendars
- Vikram Samvat: 258–259
- Shaka Samvat: 123–124
- Kali Yuga: 3302–3303
- Holocene calendar: 10202
- Iranian calendar: 420 BP – 419 BP
- Islamic calendar: 433 BH – 432 BH
- Javanese calendar: 79–80
- Julian calendar: 202; CCII
- Korean calendar: 2535
- Minguo calendar: 1710 before ROC 民前1710年
- Nanakshahi calendar: −1266
- Seleucid era: 513/514 AG
- Thai solar calendar: 744–745
- Tibetan calendar: ལྕགས་མོ་སྦྲུལ་ལོ་ (female Iron-Snake); 328 or −53 or −825 — to — ཆུ་ཕོ་རྟ་ལོ་ (male Water-Horse); 329 or −52 or −824

Year 202 (CCII) was a common year starting on Friday of the Julian calendar. At the time, it was known as the Year of the Consulship of Severus and Antoninus (or, less frequently, year 955 Ab urbe condita). The denomination 202 for this year has been used since the early medieval period, when the Anno Domini calendar era became the prevalent method in Europe for naming years.

== Events ==
=== By place ===
==== Roman Empire ====
- Emperor Septimius Severus returns to Rome after a five-year absence. Festivals are held to celebrate his six-year reign. Severus undertakes changes in the imperial government, giving the Roman army a dominant role, raising pay in the legions and permitting legionaries to marry in order to secure their loyalty.
- Rome is a city of about 1.5 million citizens, its people housed mostly in 46,600 insulae or apartment blocks, each three to eight stories high, flimsily made of wood, brick or rubble.
- Some 400,000 slaves perform the menial work of Rome, with middle-class citizens often owning eight; the rich from 500 to 1,000; an emperor as many as 20,000. Free urban workers enjoy 17 to 18 hours of leisure each day, with free admission to baths, sport events and gladiatorial games.
- Severus launches a campaign in Africa; Legio III Augusta under Quintus Anicius Faustus fights a guerrilla war against the Garamantes along the Limes Tripolitanus. They capture several settlements such as Cydamus, Gholaia and their capital Garama, 600 km south of Lepcis Magna. The province of Numidia is enlarged: the Romans annex Castellum Dimmidi, Gemellae and Vescera.
- An edict bans conversions to Christianity and all Christian propaganda.
- A Roman law bans female gladiators.
- The Pantheon is restored.

==== China ====
- Battle of Bowang: Warlord Liu Bei defeats Cao Cao's forces under Xiahou Dun.

=== By topic ===
==== Religion ====
- In order to avoid Septimus Severus' persecution of Christians, Clement of Alexandria seeks refuge with Alexander in Cappadocia.

== Births ==
- Jiang Wei, Chinese general and regent (d. 264)

== Deaths ==
- June 28 – Yuan Shao, Chinese warlord (b. 154)
- Irenaeus, Greek bishop and theologian (b. 130)
- Lady Wu, wife of Sun Jian and mother of Sun Ce
- Pang Ji (or Yangtu), Chinese official and adviser
