= Wang Chen (Three Kingdoms) =

Chinese official, general and historian (died 266)

- 王沈

Regular Mounted Attendant (散騎常侍)
- In office ?–?
- Monarch: Emperor Wu of Jin

Master of Writing (尚書)
- In office ?–?
- Monarch: Emperor Wu of Jin

Palace Attendant (侍中)
- In office ?– February 266
- Monarch: Cao Fang / Cao Mao / Cao Huan

Personal details
- Born: Unknown Taiyuan, Shanxi
- Died: 266
- Relations: Wang Chang (1st cousin once removed)
- Children: Wang Jun
- Parent: Wang Ji (father)
- Occupation: Historian, military general, politician
- Courtesy name: Chudao (處道)
- Peerage: Marquis of Anping (安平侯)

Wang Chen (Note: Wang's name was written as "王沉" in the Jin Shus by Yu Yu and Zang Rongxu, as cited in Taiping Yulan.) (died June or July 266 CE (Note: According to Sima Yan's biography in Book of Jin, and vol.79 of Zizhi Tongjian, Wang Chen died on the renzi day of the 5th month of the 2nd year of the Taishi era of Sima Yan's reign. However, there is no renzi day in that month. Wang Chen most likely died within that month, which corresponds to 20 June to 19 July 266 on the proleptic Gregorian calendar.)), courtesy name Chudao, posthumously known as Duke Yuan of Boling (博陵元公 (Note: The annals of Emperor Wu in Book of Jin recorded that Wang Chen's peerage when he died was "Duke of Boling", while Wang's biography in vol.39 of the same work recorded that his posthumous name was "Yuan". The biography also recorded that while Wang Chen declined the dukedom while he was alive, Emperor Wu re-bestowed the peerage after his death.)), was a Chinese historian, military general, and politician of the state of Cao Wei during the Three Kingdoms period of China. He was a member of Wang clan of Taiyuan.

After the Wei regime ended in February 266, he continued serving in the government of the Jin dynasty. He wrote a five-volume text known as the Wang Chudao Collection (王處道集) or Wang Chen Collection (王沈集), which is already lost over the course of history. He also wrote 14 chapters of the Quan Jin Wen (全晉文).

== Life ==
Wang Chen was from Jinyang County (晉陽縣), Taiyuan Commandery (太原郡), which is located southwest of present-day Taiyuan, Shanxi. His father Wang Ji (王機) died young; Chen was raised by his father's 1st cousin, Wang Chang, who later served as the Minister of Works (司空) in the Wei government. He was known for his literary talent and was employed by the regent Cao Shuang as a secretary. He was promoted to the position of a Gentleman Attendant (侍郎) later.

In 249, after Cao Shuang was ousted from power by his co-regent Sima Yi in February, Wang Chen initially lost his appointment but was later restored to the civil service as a Palace Attendant (侍中). He co-wrote the 44-volume historical text Book of Wei (魏書) with Xun Yi and Ruan Ji. The Wei emperor Cao Mao, who was fond of reading, called Wang Chen a "Master of Literature" (文籍先生). In 260, when Cao Mao planned to launch a coup to seize back power from the regent Sima Zhao, he summoned Wang Chen, Wang Ye and Wang Jing to meet him in private and discuss their plans. However, Wang Chen and Wang Ye reported the plot to Sima Zhao instead, (Note: In his annotations to Zizhi Tongjian, Hu Sanxing lamented the fact that despite Cao Mao's respectful treatment of Wang Chen, and calling the latter "Master of Literature", Wang still betrayed Cao to Sima Zhao.) and Cao Mao ended up being assassinated by Sima Zhao's men. After Cao Mao's death, Sima Zhao awarded Wang Chen the title "Marquis of Anping" (安平侯) and 2,000 taxable households in his marquisate.

In 266, after Sima Yan (Emperor Wu), Sima Zhao's son, ended the state of Wei and established the Jin dynasty in February, Wang Chen continued to serve in the Jin government and held the appointments of a Master of Writing (尚書) and a Regular Mounted Attendant (散騎常侍). He died later that year and was posthumously awarded the title of a commandery duke (郡公) during the Xian'ning era (275-279) of Emperor Wu's reign; at the time of Wang's funeral, Emperor Wu decreed that while he respect Wang's decision to decline the dukedom, he would allow Wang to be buried with rites accorded to a commandery duke.

== See also ==
- Lists of people of the Three Kingdoms
