= Killing of Cao Mao =

Regicide in state of Cao Wei (260)

Ganlu Incident
- Part of the wars of the Three Kingdoms
Date	2 June 260 (Note: Cao Mao's biography in the Sanguozhi recorded that he died on the jichou day of the 5th month of the 5th year of the Ganlu era of his reign. This date corresponds to 2 June 260 in the Gregorian calendar.)
Location	Luoyang, China
Result	Cao Mao murdered and Wang Jing's clan exterminated (Note: Both Cheng Ji and his brother died in the aftermath of the incident, but the manner of their deaths and the fate of their families differ across various sources.)

Belligerents
Cao Mao and conspirators	Sima Zhao and various defenders

Commanders and leaders
Cao Mao †; Wang Chen (Defected); Wang Jing; Wang Ye (Defected)	Sima Zhao; Sima Zhou; Jia Chong; Cheng Ji; Wang Chen; Wang Ye

Strength
several hundred servants	

The regicide of Cao Mao, also known as the Ganlu Incident (Chinese: 甘露之變), occurred on 2 June 260 in Luoyang, the capital of the state of Cao Wei, during the Three Kingdoms period. Cao Mao, the nominal emperor of Wei, attempted to oust the regent Sima Zhao, who effectively controlled the Wei government. However, the plot concluded with Cao Mao's death and Sima Zhao retaining his status. Contrary to its intention, the coup actually increased the Sima clan's power and influence in Wei, albeit at the cost of Sima Zhao's personal standing, thus providing a foundation for the eventual usurpation of the Wei throne in February 266 by Sima Zhao's son Sima Yan, who founded the Western Jin dynasty.

The incident is depicted in the historical novel Romance of the Three Kingdoms by Luo Guanzhong, which dramatises the history of the late Eastern Han dynasty and the Three Kingdoms period. The events of the incident described in the novel are largely similar to that described in historical sources.

== Background ==
The state of Cao Wei was established in December 220 by Cao Pi, which marked the start of the Three Kingdoms period in China. The authority of the Wei imperial family had been weakening since the death of the second Wei emperor, Cao Rui in January 239, and reached a nadir after the Incident at the Gaoping Tombs in February 249, when the Wei general Sima Yi seized power from the regent Cao Shuang. Sima Yi died in September 251 and was succeeded by his sons Sima Shi and Sima Zhao, who effectively controlled the Wei government.

In October 254, Sima Shi deposed the third Wei ruler, Cao Fang, and installed a 13-year-old Cao Mao on the throne in November. From the start of his reign, Cao Mao acted in defiance of the Simas, refusing to accept the imperial seal directly from Sima Shi, and, after Sima Shi's death in March 255, he attempted to order Sima Zhao to remain in Xuchang to keep watch over Shouchun (present-day Shou County, Anhui), where a rebellion led by Guanqiu Jian and Wen Qin had just been suppressed. However, Sima Zhao ignored Cao Mao's edict and returned to the capital Luoyang. While Sima Zhao administered state affairs, Cao Mao attempted to gain the favour of the literati in the court through unremarkable meetings to discuss literature with some officials—Sima Zhao's cousin Sima Wang, Wang Chen, Pei Xiu, and Zhong Hui. Cao Mao also provided Sima Wang with a chariot and five imperial guardsmen as escorts because the latter lived further away from the palace than the others.

In c.July 258, Sima Zhao was offered the title of Duke of Jin and the nine bestowments a total of nine times, all of which he declined. Discussion and debate over the matter allowed him to judge his level of support.

A few months later, in c.February 259, Cao Mao received sightings of yellow dragons in two wells; he wrote a poem identifying the dragons as being trapped inside wells and likened himself to the dragons. Sima Zhao saw the poem and was angry.

In c.May 260, Sima Zhao was again offered the title of Duke of Jin and the nine bestowments and did not immediately decline. (Note: Cao Mao's biography in Sanguozhi did not record Sima Zhao's rejection; his biography in Book of Jin did record that he declined to accept the honours. The month corresponds to 28 Apr to 26 May 260 in the Julian calendar.)

== The incident ==
Probably due to his status as a Jin official, Chen Shou did not record any details of how the incident occurred in the Records of the Three Kingdoms. Instead, details of the incident largely come from Pei Songzhi's Annotated Records of the Three Kingdoms, Sima Zhao's biography in the Tang-era Jin Shu, and Sima Guang's Zizhi Tongjian.

On 2 June 260, 19-year-old Cao Mao gathered his associates Wang Chen, Wang Jing, and Wang Ye, declaring his intention to make a last-ditch attempt to overthrow Sima Zhao, even at the cost of his life.

Wang Jing advised the emperor against such an action, but Cao Mao ignored Wang Jing's advice and informed Empress Dowager Guo of his plan. In his absence, Wang Chen and Wang Ye secretly deserted Cao Mao and notified Sima Zhao about the plot. (Note: The Wei Jin Shiyu recorded that before Wang Chen and Wang Ye went to Sima Zhao, they revealed their intentions to Wang Jing; Jing refused to join them due to his uprightness. The Jin Zhugong Zan had a different account: it recorded that as Chen and Ye were about to leave Jing, they called out to the latter. Jing refused to join them, saying, "You two should be on your way!" In vol.03 of Zizhi Tongjian Kaoyi, Sima Guang indicated that Tongjian adopted the account found in Jin Zhugong Zan.) (Note: In his annotations to Zizhi Tongjian, Hu Sanxing lamented the fact that despite Cao Mao's respectful treatment of Wang Chen, and calling the latter "Master of Literature", Wang still betrayed Cao to Sima Zhao.)

Cao Mao then led his forces from the palace, personally wielding a sword. Sima Zhao's younger half-brother Sima Zhou, then holding the position of a Colonel of the Garrison Cavalry (屯騎校尉), led his troops to stop Cao Mao. However, his men dispersed in fear when Cao Mao shouted at them. Man Changwu (a grandson of Man Chong) was in charge of guarding one of the palace gates. Sima Zhao's younger full-brother Sima Gan led his men to the palace to assist Sima Zhao, but Man Changwu refused to let him pass and told him to enter through another gate instead. Later, when Sima Zhao asked Sima Gan why he was late, Sima Gan told him what happened. (Note: Another version of this anecdote was recorded in Xun Xu's biography in Book of Jin. In this account, Sima Gan was denied entry by Sun You (孫佑), who was also an officer guarding the main gate, so he had to enter the palace through another gate. When Sima Zhao found out why Sima Gan showed up late, he wanted to execute Sun You and his family. However, Xun Xu advised him against it by pointing out that it would be unfair and unjust to punish Sun You's family as well, given that the family of Cheng Ji's brother Cheng Cui was not implicated. Sima Zhao heeded Xun Xu's advice and punished Sun You only, by demoting him to the status of a commoner. It is possible that both Man Changwu and Sun You were involved in the anecdote.)

Sima Zhao's aide Jia Chong led another defence at the South Watchtower. When Cheng Ji (成濟), a military officer under Jia Chong, asked Jia what to do, Jia told him to defend the Sima clan regardless of the consequences. Cheng Ji then approached Cao Mao and killed the emperor with his spear. (Note: The Wei Mo Zhuan recorded that Jia gave explicit orders to Cheng Ji and his brother to kill the emperor. However, most other records' accounts, such as Xi Zuochi's Han Jin Chun Qiu and Gan Bao's Jin Ji (both cited by Pei Songzhi in his annotations to Cao Mao's biography in Sanguozhi), and Sima Zhao's and Jia Chong's biographies in Book of Jin, was that Jia's orders were ambiguous.)

== Aftermath ==
After Cao Mao's death, the public called for Jia Chong's execution on the grounds that he had committed regicide. Sima Zhao forced Empress Dowager Guo to posthumously demote Cao Mao to the status of a commoner, citing the precedent of the Prince of Changyi during the Western Han dynasty, and then ordered Wang Jing and his clan to be executed. The following day (3 June 260), after pleas from his uncle Sima Fu and other senior officials such as Gao Rou and Zheng Chong, Sima Zhao asked Empress Dowager Guo to posthumously instate Cao Mao as the "Duke of Gaogui Village" (高貴鄉公) and bury Cao Mao with the ceremonies befitting that of a prince, though this may not actually be carried out. (Note: Xi Zuochi's Hanjin Chunqiu recorded that Cao Mao's funeral procession consisted of only a few chariots and did not carry the customary banners used in funerals. Pei Songzhi was skeptical of this account; he felt that Xi was deliberately downplaying the scale of Cao Mao's funeral due to his bias.) Cao Huang (later renamed to Cao Huan), the Duke of Changdao (常道鄉公), was chosen to succeed Cao Mao and was installed on the throne. 18 days later, Sima Zhao had Cheng Ji and his family executed to appease public anger, (Note: Cao Mao's biography in Sanguozhi, and the Zizhi Tongjian both recorded that Sima Zhao gave orders to execute Cheng Ji, his brother and their immediate families on 21 Jun 260. However, Sima Zhao's biography in Book of Jin recorded the punishment as "executing (Cheng's) three clans. Xun Xu's biography in the same work also recorded that only Cheng Cui was executed (and thus implied that his family was spared).) (Note: Sun Sheng's Wei Shi Chunqiu recorded that Cheng Ji and his brother refused to surrender themselves for punishment. Instead, they bared their chests and climbed to the rooftop of their homes, while uttering curses and slanders. They were then killed by arrows shot at them.) but Jia Chong was spared. From that point on, however, Jia Chong's reputation among the people was one of regicide. (Note: At a banquet in 272, Yu Chun, who was then Intendant of Henan, reminded Jia of his role in Cao Mao's death; vol.79 of Zizhi Tongjian and Yu Chun's biography in vol.50 of Jin Shu had different accounts of the conversation between the two. Humiliated, Jia submitted a memorial to the throne requesting to be relieved of his positions, while Yu also submitted a memorial of self-admonition. Yu Chun was a brother of Yu Liang's grandfather.)

Sima Zhao successfully retained his power during the incident and eliminated his opponents in the Wei court, leaving only the young Cao Huan as a puppet emperor under his control. He did not take the Wei throne, even until his death. (Note: Due to Cao Mao's death in public, Sima Zhao's standing was weakened, and was partially restored after the successful campaign against Shu in late 263.) Instead, he was first granted the title of a vassal duke —"Duke of Jin" (晉公) and the nine bestowments in December 263, after the successful campaign against Shu. A few months later, he was made a vassal king—"King of Jin" (晉王)—by Cao Huan in May 264. Sima Zhao died in September 265 and was succeeded by his son Sima Yan, who forced Cao Huan to abdicate in his favour in February 266 and established the Western Jin dynasty. In 280, Sima Yan would order the conquest of Jin's rival state Wu, ending the Three Kingdoms period and unifying China after nearly a century.

== See also ==
- Three Rebellions in Shouchun
