= Jiang Wei's Northern Expeditions =

Military campaigns between Shu Han and Cao Wei (240-262)

- Part of the wars of the Three Kingdoms period
Date	240–262 CE
Location	Northwestern China (primarily within modern Gansu and Shaanxi provinces)
Result	Cao Wei victory; Shu Han retreat

Belligerents
Shu Han; Di and Qiang tribes	Cao Wei

Commanders and leaders
Jiang Wei; Zhang Yi; Wang Ping; Liao Hua; Ma Zhong; Zhang Ni †; Xiahou Ba (after 249); Hu Ji	Guo Huai; Xiahou Ba (before 249); Chen Tai; Xu Zhi †; Li Jian (surrendered); Deng Ai; Wang Jing (executed); Sima Fu; Sima Wang

Jiang Wei's Northern Expeditions
- Traditional Chinese: 姜維北伐
- Simplified Chinese: 姜维北伐
Transcriptions
Standard Mandarin
- Hanyu Pinyin: Jiāng Wéi Běifá

Nine campaigns on the Central Plains
- Traditional Chinese: 九伐中原
- Simplified Chinese: 九伐中原
Transcriptions
Standard Mandarin
- Hanyu Pinyin: Jǐufá Zhōngyuán

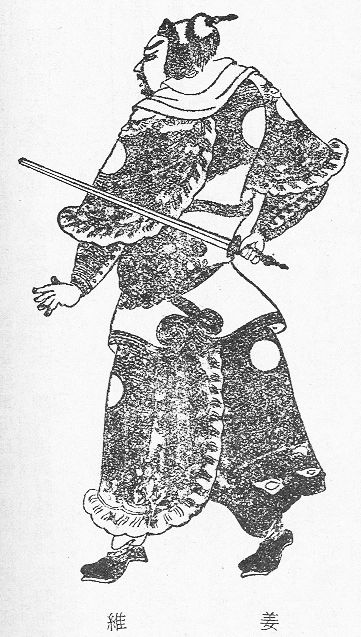
Portrait of the general Jiang Wei from a Qing Dynasty edition of The Romance of the Three Kingdoms.

Jiang Wei's Northern Expeditions refer to a series of eleven military campaigns launched by the state of Shu Han against its rival state, Cao Wei, between 240 and 262 CE during the Three Kingdoms period in China. The campaigns were led by Jiang Wei, a prominent Shu general. Unlike the previous Northern campaigns led by Zhuge Liang, which added Wudu and Yinping commanderies to Shu Han state territories, Jiang Wei's campaigns ended up being unpopular in both the military and civil circles in Shu. Also unlike Zhuge Liang's campaigns which often featured 60,000 to sometimes even 100,000 Shu Troops, Jiang Wei's were often much smaller rarely exceeding 30,000 even after the death of Fei Yi, where Jiang Wei assumed control of the military. The Zhuge Liang campaigns did suffer from logistical and supply issues for their large army. Zhuge's successor Jiang Wan, believed that it was the Hanzhong's mountainous terrain itself that were to blame for the campaigns failures and attempted to switch the route through the Han river. Fei Yi, who succeeded Jiang Wan, agreed, and never allowed any large campaigns to be launched by Hanzhong. Jiang Wei however overlooked these concerns and used Hanzhong as his home base as Zhuge Liang did.

Each campaign was ultimately aborted due to inadequate food supplies, heavy losses on the battlefield, or other reasons. The campaigns drained Shu's already limited resources and preceded the eventual fall of Shu in 263.

In popular culture and the 14th-century historical novel Romance of the Three Kingdoms, the campaigns were erroneously referred to as the "nine campaigns on the Central Plains" (九伐中原). This description is inaccurate because there were actually eleven campaigns instead of nine, and the battles were fought in locations far from the Central Plains.

== Prelude ==
In 227, China was divided into three competing regimes – Cao Wei, Shu Han and Eastern Wu – each with the purpose of reunifying the territories of the fallen Han dynasty under its own control. Between 228 and 234, Zhuge Liang, the chancellor-regent of Shu, had led a series of five campaigns to attack Wei, but each campaign ultimately proved unsuccessful and the overall result was a stalemate. Zhuge Liang died of illness during the fifth campaign in 234. After Zhuge Liang's death, Jiang Wan and Fei Yi, who consecutively succeeded him as the regents of Shu, discontinued his aggressive foreign policy towards Wei and focused more on domestic policies and internal development. There was a six-year-long period of relative peace between Shu and Wei until 240, when the Shu general Jiang Wei decided to follow-up on Zhuge Liang's legacy and continue launching attacks on Wei.

== First expedition (240) ==
In 240, Jiang Wei led Shu forces to attack the Wei-controlled Longxi Commandery. In response, the Wei general Guo Huai led his forces to attack the enemy and drove them towards territory controlled by the Qiang tribes. Jiang Wei withdrew his troops and returned to Shu. In the meantime, Guo Huai attacked the Qiang tribes led by Midang (迷當) and defeated them. He also received the surrender of over 3,000 Di tribal clans, whom he relocated to the Guanzhong region (present-day central Shaanxi). (Note: (正始元年，蜀將羌維出隴西。淮遂進軍，追至彊中，維退，遂討羌迷當等，案撫柔氐三千餘落，拔徙以實關中。) Sanguozhi vol. 26.)

Timeline of Jiang Wei's Northern Expeditions
Approximate date range	Location	Event(s)
240	Dingxi, Gansu	First Northern Expedition: Jiang Wei attacks Longxi Commandery but is driven back by Guo Huai.; Guo Huai also defeats the Qiang tribes under Midang and forces them to surrender.
247	Gansu and Qinghai	Second Northern Expedition: The Qiang tribes rebel against Wei rule in Longxi, Nan'an, Jincheng and Xiping commanderies.; Jiang Wei leads Shu forces to support the Qiang rebels.; Guo Huai and Xiahou Ba drive back Jiang Wei and suppress the Qiang rebellions.
248	Gansu, Qinghai and Inner Mongolia	Guo Huai defeats Qiang rebels under Ezhesai and Zhiwudai in Heguan, Baitu and Longyi counties.; Third Northern Expedition: Jiang Wei leads Shu forces to support Zhiwudai, and leaves Liao Hua behind to guard Chengzhong Mountain. When Guo Huai attacks Liao Hua, Jiang Wei is forced to turn back to save Liao Hua and fails to meet up with Zhiwudai.
6 Feb – 1 Mar 249		Xiahou Ba defects to Shu after the Incident at Gaoping Tombs on 5 Feb.
c. Sep – Nov 249	Gansu, Shaanxi and Sichuan	Fourth Northern Expedition: Jiang Wei attacks Yong Province and builds two fortresses at Qushan.; Chen Tai, Xu Zhi and Deng Ai capture the two Shu fortresses at Qushan.; Jiang Wei pretends to retreat and sends Liao Hua to attack Deng Ai at Baishui and keep him distracted. Deng Ai knows that Jiang Wei is actually targeting Taocheng so he sends troops to reinforce Taocheng. Jiang Wei has no choice but to retreat.
250	Qinghai	Fifth Northern Expedition: Jiang Wei attacks Xiping Commandery and retreats after failing to capture it.
16 Feb – 17 Mar 253	Chengdu, Sichuan	Fei Yi is assassinated by Guo Xiu, a Wei defector.
14 Jun – 9 Sep 253	Hefei, Anhui	Battle of Hefei: Zhang Te successfully defends Hefei from attacks by Zhuge Ke.
14 Jun – 9 Sep 253	Southeastern Gansu	Sixth Northern Expedition: Jiang Wei besieges Didao.; Sima Shi orders Guo Huai and Chen Tai to repel Jiang Wei.; Jiang Wei pulls back his troops when they run out of food supplies.
2 – 31 Jul 254	Southeastern Gansu	Seventh Northern Expedition: Jiang Wei attacks Longxi Commandery.; Li Jian defects and surrenders Didao to Shu.; Battle of Xiangwu County: Zhang Ni and Xu Zhi are killed in battle.; Shu forces capture Didao, Heguan and Lintao and relocate their residents to Shu territory.
18 Sep – 11 Nov 255	Southeastern Gansu	Eighth Northern Expedition: Battle of Didao
8 Aug – 6 Sep 256	Southeastern Gansu	Ninth Northern Expedition: Deng Ai repels an invasion led by Jiang Wei.
c. Jun 257 – Mar/Apr 258	Shou County, Anhui	Zhuge Dan's Rebellion: Zhuge Dan starts a rebellion against Wei in Shouchun with support from Eastern Wu but the rebellion is ultimately suppressed by Wei forces.
c. Jun 257 – Mar/Apr 258	Gansu and Shaanxi	Tenth Northern Expedition: Jiang Wei attacks the Wei garrisons near the Great Wall. Sima Wang and Deng Ai surround Jiang Wei at Mangshui but do not engage him in battle. Jiang Wei retreats after learning of the failure of Zhuge Dan's Rebellion.
30 Oct – 28 Nov 262	Southeastern Gansu	Eleventh Northern Expedition: Deng Ai defeats Jiang Wei at Houhe County. Jiang Wei retreats to Tazhong.

== Second expedition (247) ==
In 247, the Qiang tribes, led by Ehe (餓何), Shaoge (燒戈), (Note: In the 14th-century historical novel Romance of the Three Kingdoms (Sanguo Yanyi), Ehe and Shaoge are amalgamated into a single character, Ehe Shaoge, who has a minor role in Chapter 109.) Fatong (伐同), Ezhesai (蛾遮塞) and others, started a rebellion against Wei in four commanderies: Longxi (around present-day Dingxi, Gansu), Nan'an (南安; around present-day Wushan County, Gansu), Jincheng (金城; around present-day Lanzhou, Gansu) and Xiping (西平; around present-day Xining, Qinghai). They attacked several cities and towns in the area, and called for Shu forces to support them. (Note: (八年，隴西、南安、金城、西平諸羌餓何、燒戈、伐同、蛾遮塞等相結叛亂，攻圍城邑，南招蜀兵，涼州名胡治無戴復叛應之。) Sanguozhi vol. 26.)

Baihuwen (白虎文) and Zhiwudai (治無戴), two influential tribal kings in Liang Province, responded by rebelling against Wei. When Jiang Wei led Shu forces into Liang Province to support the Qiang rebels, Baihuwen and Zhiwudai submitted to him. (Note: (是歲，雍、涼羌胡叛降漢，漢姜維將兵出隴右以應之，與雍州刺史郭淮、討蜀護軍夏侯霸戰于洮西。胡王白虎文、治無戴等率部落降維，維徙之入蜀。淮進擊羌胡餘黨，皆平之。) Zizhi Tongjian vol. 75.)

The Wei imperial court ordered Xiahou Ba to lead troops to garrison at the flank. When Guo Huai and his forces showed up at Didao (狄道; around present-day Lintao County, Gansu), his advisers suggested that they should attack Fuhan County (枹罕縣; in present-day Linxia County, Gansu) and pacify the Qiang tribes first before dealing with the invading Shu forces. Guo Huai predicted that Jiang Wei would attack Xiahou Ba's position, so he headed south to reinforce Xiahou Ba. As he expected, Jiang Wei did attack Xiahou Ba at the west of the Tao River, but retreated when Guo Huai and his reinforcements showed up. Guo Huai then moved on to attack the Qiang rebels, killed Ehe and Shaoge, and forced the thousands of Qiang tribal clans to surrender. (Note: (討蜀護軍夏侯霸督諸軍屯為翅。淮軍始到狄道，議者僉謂宜先討定枹罕，內平惡羌，外折賊謀。淮策維必來攻霸，遂入渢中，轉南迎霸。維果攻為翅，會淮軍適至，維遁退。進討叛羌，斬餓何、燒戈，降服者萬餘落。) Sanguozhi vol. 26.) (Note: (十年， ... 又出隴西、南安、金城界，與魏大將軍郭淮、夏侯霸等戰於洮西。胡王治無戴等舉部落降，維將還安處之。) Sanguozhi vol. 44.)

== Third expedition (248) ==
In 248, Ezhesai (蛾遮塞) and the Qiang rebels occupied fortresses in Heguan (河關; in the vicinity of present-day Dingxi, Gansu) and Baitu (白土; in present-day Minhe County, Qinghai) counties and used them as defences against Wei forces across the Tao River. Guo Huai pretended that he was going to attack from upstream, but actually secretly ordered his troops to cross the river downstream to attack Baitu. The assault was successful and the rebels were defeated. Zhiwudai (治無戴) led his tribal forces to attack Wuwei Commandery but left his family in Xihai Commandery (西海郡; near the Juyan Lake Basin, Inner Mongolia). When Guo Huai learnt about it, he led his troops to attack Xihai Commandery, but encountered Zhiwudai and his forces, who were on their way back from Wuwei Commandery. The two armies clashed at the north of Longyi County (龍夷縣; west of present-day Huangyuan County, Qinghai), with the Wei forces emerging victorious and Zhiwudai's forces retreating. (Note: (九年，遮塞等屯河關、白土故城，據河拒軍。淮見形上流，密於下渡兵據白土城，擊，大破之。治無戴圍武威，家屬留在西海。淮進軍趨西海，欲掩取其累重，會無戴折還，與戰於龍夷之北，破走之。令居惡虜在石頭山之西，當大道止，斷絕王使。淮還過討，大破之。) Sanguozhi vol. 26.)

Jiang Wei led Shu forces from Shiying (石營; northwest of present-day Xihe County, Gansu) to Qiangchuan (彊川; west of present-day Lintan County, Gansu) to rendezvous with Zhiwudai and his retreating troops. He left Liao Hua behind in Chengzhong Mountain (成重山; west of present-day Lintao County, Gansu) to build a fortress and gather the remaining Qiang forces and keep them as hostages in the fortress. When Guo Huai heard about Jiang Wei's advances, he wanted to divide his forces into two groups to attack the enemy. His officers, however, had a different opinion. They expected to Jiang Wei to head west to meet Zhiwudai and combine their forces, while Liao Hua would remain behind to defend the Shu position at Chengzhong Mountain. If they split their army into two, their attacking power would be greatly reduced, and they might end up in a situation where they were able to neither resist Jiang Wei nor capture Liao Hua's position. They urged Guo Huai to concentrate on advancing westward to attack Jiang Wei and Zhiwudai separately before they could meet up. (Note: (姜維出石營，從彊川，乃西迎治無戴，留陰平太守廖化於成重山築城，斂破羌保質。淮欲分兵取之。諸將以維衆西接彊胡，化以據險，分軍兩持，兵勢轉弱，進不制維，退不拔化，非計也，不如合而俱西，及胡、蜀未接，絕其內外，此伐交之兵也。) Sanguozhi vol. 26.)

Guo Huai stood by his initial plan and said: "If we attack Liao Hua, we can catch the enemy off guard. Jiang Wei will then definitely turn back to save Liao Hua. By the time he returns, we would have already defeated Liao Hua. By doing so, we can make Jiang Wei and his men weary from travelling forth and back. If Jiang Wei does not meet the barbarians, the barbarians will retreat on their own. This is the best approach." He then instructed Xiahou Ba to lead one detachment to pursue Jiang Wei towards Tazhong (沓中; northwest of present-day Zhugqu County, Gansu), while he led the other group to attack Liao Hua. As Guo Huai foresaw, Jiang Wei did turn back to save Liao Hua and failed to meet up with Zhiwudai. (Note: (淮曰：「今往取化，出賊不意，維必狼顧。比維自致，足以定化，且使維疲於奔命。兵不遠西，而胡交自離，此一舉而兩全之策也。」乃別遣夏侯霸等追維於沓中，淮自率諸軍就攻化等。維果馳還救化，皆如淮計。) Sanguozhi vol. 26.)

== Fourth expedition (249) ==
In the spring of 249, the Wei regent Cao Shuang was deposed and executed in a coup launched by his co-regent Sima Yi, who then held full control of the Wei government. Xiahou Ba was then a subordinate of Xiahou Xuan, who held the position of General Who Attacks the West (征西將軍). Xiahou Xuan was a relative of both Xiahou Ba and Cao Shuang. After Cao Shuang's death, Sima Yi summoned Xiahou Xuan back to the capital, Luoyang, and replaced him with Guo Huai. Guo Huai thus became Xiahou Ba's new commanding officer. Xiahou Ba had all along not been on good terms with Guo Huai, so he feared that he would end up like Cao Shuang, hence he fled and defected to Shu. (Note: (十二年春正月，魏誅大將軍曹爽等，右將軍夏侯霸來降。) Sanguozhi vol. 33.) (Note: (初，右將軍夏侯霸為曹爽所厚，以其父淵死於蜀，常切齒有報仇之志，為討蜀護軍，屯於隴西，統屬征西。征西將軍夏侯玄，霸之從子，爽之外弟也。爽旣誅，司馬懿召玄詣京師，以雍州刺史郭淮代之。霸素與淮不叶，以為禍必相及，大懼，遂奔漢。) Zizhi Tongjian vol. 75.)

In autumn, Jiang Wei led Shu forces to attack the Wei-controlled Yong Province, had two fortresses constructed at Qushan (麴山; southeast of present-day Min County, Gansu), and ordered his officers Ju An (句安) and Li Xin (李歆) to guard them. He also contacted the Qiang tribes and requested assistance from them in harassing the commanderies in Yong Province. Guo Huai discussed with Chen Tai, the Inspector of Yong Province, on how to deal with the Shu invasion. Chen Tai said: "The fortresses at Qushan may be well-defended, but the roads leading into Shu are difficult to travel, so they will require a sufficient amount of supplies. The Qiang tribes are worried about this weakness of the Shu army, so they may not be willing to help Shu. If we surround the fortresses and attack them, we can easily capture them. Even if Shu reinforcements arrive, the dangerous mountainous terrain will cause them to be worn out." (Note: (秋，漢衞將軍姜維寇雍州，依麴山築二城，使牙門將句安、李歆等守之，聚羌胡質任，侵偪諸郡；征西將軍郭淮與雍州刺史陳泰禦之。泰曰：「麴城雖固，去蜀險遠，當須運糧；羌夷患維勞役，必未肯附。今圍而取之，可不血刃而拔其城；雖其有救，山道阻險，非行兵之地也。」) Zizhi Tongjian vol. 75.) (Note: (... 泰曰：「麴城雖固，去蜀險遠，當須運糧。羌夷患維勞役，必未肯附。今圍而取之，可不血刃而拔其城；雖其有救，山道阻險，非行兵之地也。」) Sanguozhi vol. 22.)

Guo Huai then ordered Chen Tai, Xu Zhi and Deng Ai to lead Wei forces to attack the fortresses at Qushan and cut off their food and water supplies. Ju An and Li Xin led their men to taunt Deng Ai to attack them, but Deng Ai ignored them. As time passed, the two fortresses gradually ran out of supplies. Jiang Wei led his troops from Mount Niutou (牛頭山; west of present-day Zhaohua District, Guangyuan, Sichuan) to reinforce the fortresses. They encountered Chen Tai and his troops along the way. Chen Tai said: "The Art of War says that the best way to win a battle is to win without fighting. If we manage to occupy Mount Niutou, Jiang Wei's return route will be sealed off and he can be easily captured by us." He then ordered his troops to build forts to resist Jiang Wei's forces but refrain from engaging the enemy. At the same time, he also wrote to Guo Huai and requested his help in attacking Mount Niutou. Guo Huai did so and led his troops across the Tao River in preparation for attacking Mount Niutou. (Note: (淮從泰計，使泰率討蜀護軍徐質、南安太守鄧艾等進兵圍之，斷其運道及城外流水。安等挑戰，不許，將士困窘，分糧聚雪以稽日月。維果來救，出自牛頭山，與泰相對。泰曰：「兵法貴在不戰而屈人。今絕牛頭，維無反道，則我之禽也。」勑諸軍各堅壘勿與戰，遣使白淮，欲自南渡白水，循水而東，使淮趣牛頭，截其還路，可并取維，不惟安等而已。淮善其策，進率諸軍軍洮水。維懼，遁走，安等孤縣，遂皆降。) Sanguozhi vol. 22.) (Note: (淮乃使泰率討蜀護軍徐質、南安太守鄧艾進兵圍麴城，斷其運道及城外流水。安等挑戰，不許，將士困窘，分糧聚雪以引日月。維引兵救之，出自牛頭山，與泰相對。泰曰：「兵法貴在不戰而屈人。今絕牛頭，維無反道，則我之禽也。」敕諸軍各堅壘勿與戰，遣使白淮，使淮趣牛頭截其還路。淮從之，進軍洮水。) Zizhi Tongjian vol. 75.)

After Jiang Wei retreated, Ju An and Li Xin became isolated at the fortresses at Qushan, so they had no choice but to surrender to the enemy. (Note: (秋，衞將軍姜維出攻雍州，不克而還。將軍句安、李韶降魏。) Sanguozhi vol. 33.) Guo Huai then led his troops further west to attack the restless Qiang tribes and forced them to surrender. (Note: (維懼，遁走，安等孤絕，遂降。淮因西擊諸羌。) Zizhi Tongjian vol. 75.) Deng Ai cautioned him: "The enemy did not retreat far. They might turn back to attack us again, so we should split up our forces in case they attack us again." (Note: (嘉平元年，與征西將軍郭淮拒蜀偏將軍姜維。維退，淮因西擊羌。艾曰：「賊去未遠，或能復還，宜分諸軍以備不虞。」) Sanguozhi vol. 28.)

Deng Ai remained behind and garrisoned at the north of Baishui (白水; in present-day Qingchuan County, Sichuan). Three days later, Jiang Wei sent Liao Hua to lead a force to approach Deng Ai's camp from the south of Baishui. Deng Ai told his officers: "Jiang Wei has turned back to attack us. We have few troops. Ideally, we should cross the river and not build a bridge. I believe Jiang Wei must have sent Liao Hua to hinder us so that we are forced to remain here, while he would attack Taocheng (洮城; northeast of present-day Min County, Gansu) from the east." Taocheng was located north of the river and was about 60 li away from Deng Ai's position. Deng Ai immediately dispatched troops to travel overnight to Taocheng to defend the fortress. As he expected, Jiang Wei crossed the river to attack Taocheng, but failed to capture the fortress because Deng Ai had already strengthened its defences. Faced with no other viable options, Jiang Wei withdrew his forces back to Shu. (Note: (於是留艾屯白水北。三日，維遣廖化自白水南向艾結營。艾謂諸將曰：「維今卒還，吾軍人少，法當來渡而不作橋。此維使化持吾，令不得還。維必自東襲取洮城。」洮城在水北，去艾屯六十里。艾即夜潛軍徑到，維果來渡，而艾先至據城，得以不敗。) Sanguozhi vol. 28.)

== Fifth expedition (250) ==
In 250, Jiang Wei led Shu forces to attack the Wei-controlled Xiping Commandery (西平郡; around present-day Xining, Qinghai). He retreated after failing to capture the commandery. (Note: (十三年，姜維復出西平，不克而還。) Sanguozhi vol. 33.) (Note: (漢姜維復寇西平，不克。) Zizhi Tongjian vol. 75.)

== Sixth expedition (253) ==
In the summer of 253, Shu's ally state, Eastern Wu, launched an attack on Wei's eastern borders, leading to the Battle of Hefei.

Jiang Wei prided himself on his familiarity with the cultures and customs of the Qiang and other non-Han Chinese tribes living in western China. As such, he often thought of inducing these tribal peoples to ally with Shu and launch a coordinated attack on the Wei-controlled territories in present-day Gansu. However, Fei Yi, the Shu regent, strongly disapproved of Jiang Wei's warmongering behaviour towards Wei, and attempted to rein Jiang Wei in by limiting the number of troops he led into battle each time to no more than 10,000. He once told Jiang Wei that they should stop attacking Wei and focus on policies promoting internal stability and prosperity in Shu. (Note: (漢姜維自以練西方風俗，兼負其才武，欲誘諸羌、胡以為羽翼，謂自隴以西，可斷而有。每欲興軍大舉，費禕常裁制不從，與其兵不過萬人，曰：「吾等不如丞相亦已遠矣；丞相猶不能定中夏，況吾等乎！不如且保國治民，謹守社稷，如其功業，以俟能者，無為希冀徼倖，決成敗於一舉；若不如志，悔之無及。」) Zizhi Tongjian vol. 76.)

On 16 February 253, Fei Yi was assassinated by Guo Xiu (郭脩), a defector from Wei, during a party on the first day of the Chinese New Year. After Fei Yi's death, Jiang Wei gained greater control over Shu's armed forces and could do as he wished. In the summer of that year, after learning of the Wu attack on Wei in the east, Jiang Wei led tens of thousands of Shu troops from Shiying (石營; northwest of present-day Xihe County, Gansu) to besiege Didao (狄道; around present-day Lintao County, Gansu). (Note: ([十六年]夏，維率將數萬人出石營，經董亭，圍南安，魏雍州刺史陳泰解圍至洛門，維糧盡退還。) Sanguozhi vol. 44.) (Note: (及禕死，維得行其志，乃將數萬人出石營，圍狄道。) Zizhi Tongjian vol. 76.)

The Wei regent Sima Shi summoned Yu Song (虞松) to seek his opinion on how to deal with the Wu and Shu incursions in the east and west respectively. Yu Song analysed the situation and said that the defences at Hefei were strong enough to resist the Wu attack for some time and that the Wu forces would eventually withdraw once they lost momentum. He suggested that they launch a swift counterattack on the Shu invaders to catch them off guard and drive them back. Sima Shi agreed and ordered Guo Huai and Chen Tai to lead the Wei forces stationed in the Guanzhong region to attack Jiang Wei and lift the siege on Didao. Chen Tai attacked the enemy at Luomen (洛門; in present-day Wushan County, Gansu). Jiang Wei eventually pulled out his troops when they ran out of food supplies. (Note: (大將軍師問於虞松曰：「今東西有事，二方皆急，而諸將意沮，若之何？」松曰：「昔周亞夫堅壁昌邑而吳、楚自敗，事有似弱而強，不可不察也。今恪悉其銳衆，足以肆暴，而坐守新城，欲以致一戰耳。若攻城不拔，請戰不可，師老衆疲，勢將自走，諸將之不徑進，乃公之利也。姜維有重兵而縣軍應恪，投食我麥，非深根之寇也。且謂我幷力於東，西方必虛，是以徑進。今若使關中諸軍倍道急赴，出其不意，殆將走矣。」師曰：「善！」乃使郭淮、陳泰悉關中之衆，解狄道之圍；敕毌丘儉按兵自守，以新城委吳。陳泰進至洛門，姜維糧盡，退還。) Zizhi Tongjian vol. 76.)

== Seventh expedition (254) ==
In the summer of 254, Jiang Wei led Shu forces to attack Longxi Commandery again. Li Jian (李簡), the Wei official in charge of Didao (狄道; around present-day Lintao County, Gansu), surrendered to Jiang Wei. Jiang Wei then pressed further to attack Xiangwu County (襄武縣; southeast of present-day Longxi County, Gansu) and engaged the Wei general Xu Zhi in battle. Xu Zhi was defeated and killed, but the Shu army also lost a general, Zhang Ni. The victorious Shu forces then occupied three counties – Didao, Heguan (河關; in the vicinity of present-day Dingxi, Gansu) and Lintao – and forced the residents to relocate to Shu-controlled territory. (Note: (明年，加督中外軍事。復出隴西，守狄道長李簡舉城降。進圍襄武，與魏將徐質交鋒，斬首破敵，魏軍敗退。維乘勝多所降下，拔河間、狄道、臨洮三縣民還， ...) Sanguozhi vol. 44.) (Note: (狄道長李簡密書請降於漢。六月，姜維寇隴西。 ... 漢姜維自狄道進拔河間、臨洮。將軍徐質與戰，殺其盪寇將軍張嶷，漢兵乃還。) Zizhi Tongjian vol. 76.) (Note: ([十七年]夏六月，維復率衆出隴西。冬，拔狄道、河間、臨洮三縣民，居于緜竹、繁縣。) Sanguozhi vol. 33.)

== Eighth expedition (255) ==
In 255, when Jiang Wei announced his plan to the Shu imperial court to launch another campaign against Wei, Zhang Yi openly objected to Jiang Wei's idea and pointed out that Shu lacked the resources to go to war and that the people were already tired of war. Jiang Wei ignored him and led a Shu army comprising tens of thousands of troops, with Zhang Yi and Xiahou Ba as his deputies, to attack Wei. Between 18 September and 17 October, the Shu army reached Fuhan County (枹罕縣; northeast of present-day Linxia County, Gansu) and prepared to attack Didao (狄道; present-day Lintao County, Gansu). (Note: (漢姜維復議出軍，征西大將軍張翼廷爭，以為：「國小民勞，不宜黷武。」維不聽，率車騎將軍夏侯霸及翼同進。八月，維將數萬人至枹罕，趨狄道。) Zizhi Tongjian vol. 76.) (Note: (時維等將數萬人至枹罕，趣狄道。) Sanguozhi vol. 22.)

In the meantime, Wang Jing, the Wei-appointed Inspector of Yong Province, reported the Shu invasion to the general Chen Tai. After Guo Huai died in 255, Chen Tai had succeeded him as General Who Attacks the West (征西將軍) and was now in charge of military affairs in Yong and Liang provinces. (Note: (淮薨，泰代為征西將軍，假節都督雍、涼諸軍事。) Sanguozhi vol. 22.) Wang Jing reported to Chen Tai that the Shu forces had split into three groups to separately attack Mount Qi (祁山; the mountainous regions around present-day Li County, Gansu), Shiying (石營; northwest of present-day Xihe County, Gansu) and Jincheng Commandery (金城郡; around present-day Yuzhong County, Gansu). He then requested permission from Chen Tai to lead troops to attack the enemy at Fuhan County and Mount Qi. Chen Tai analysed the situation and concluded that the Shu army's power would be reduced if they split into three groups to attack Liang Province, so he told Wang Jing to wait and closely observe the enemy's movements first, and then later they would launch a pincer attack on the enemy from the east and west. (Note: (後年，雍州刺史王經白泰，云姜維、夏侯霸欲三道向祁山、石營、金城，求進兵為翅，使涼州軍至枹罕，討蜀護軍向祁山。泰量賊勢終不能三道，且兵勢惡分，涼州未宜越境，報經：「審其定問，知所趣向，須東西勢合乃進。」) Sanguozhi vol. 22.) (Note: (征西將軍陳泰敕雍州刺史王經進屯狄道，須泰軍到，東西合勢乃進。) Zizhi Tongjian vol. 76.)

When Chen Tai and his reinforcements reached Chencang (陳倉; east of present-day Baoji, Shaanxi), Wang Jing had already been defeated by Jiang Wei at Gu Pass (故關) and retreated across the Tao River. Chen Tai was worried that Wang Jing might not be able to defend the Wei position at Didao, so he led his troops to reinforce Didao. Wang Jing clashed with Jiang Wei at the west bank of the Tao River and was defeated. Left with about 10,000 men, Wang Jing retreated to Didao while his remaining troops were scattered or killed. (Note: (泰軍陳倉，經所統諸軍於故關與漢人戰不利，經輒渡洮水。泰以經不堅據狄道，必有他變，率諸軍以繼之。經已與維戰於洮西，大敗，以萬餘人還保狄道城，餘皆奔散，死者萬計。) Zizhi Tongjian vol. 76.) (Note: (... 後十八年，復與車騎將軍夏侯霸等俱出狄道，大破魏雍州刺史王經於洮西，經衆死者數萬人。) Sanguozhi vol. 44.)

Jiang Wei took advantage of the momentum to press on and besiege Didao. (Note: (泰勑經進屯狄道，須軍到，乃規取之。泰進軍陳倉。會經所統諸軍於故關與賊戰不利，經輒渡洮。泰以經不堅據狄道，必有它變。並遣五營在前，泰率諸軍繼之。經巳與維戰，大敗，以萬餘人還保狄道城，餘皆奔散。維乘勝圍狄道。) Sanguozhi vol. 22.) At this point in time, Zhang Yi told Jiang Wei: "It's time to stop. We shouldn't advance any further, or we will risk losing everything we have gained so far. Advancing further is equivalent to adding legs to a snake." (Note: The phrase "adding legs to a snake" is derived from a Chinese idiom, hua she tian zu (畫蛇添足; 'draw a snake and add legs to it'). The idiom story says that a man who participated in a snake drawing contest finished before the time was up. However, instead of submitting his drawing, he decided to use the remaining time to add four legs to his snake. He lost the contest eventually. This idiom is used to describe people doing unnecessary things and ending up ruining what they set out to do in the first place.) (Note: (張翼謂維曰：「可以止矣，不宜復進，或毀此大功，為蛇畫足。」維大怒，遂進圍狄道。) Zizhi Tongjian vol. 76.) Jiang Wei disregarded his advice.

In the meantime, Chen Tai, who was at Shanggui County (上邽縣; in present-day Tianshui, Gansu), split up his forces and ordered them to advance day and night to quickly capture and defend strategic locations in the area. (Note: (泰軍上邽，分兵守要，晨夜進前。) Sanguozhi vol. 22.) The Wei imperial court appointed Deng Ai as acting General Who Stabilises the West (安西將軍) and ordered him to lead troops to assist Chen Tai in resisting the Shu invasion. Days later, the Grand Commandant (太尉) Sima Fu also led backup forces to reinforce Chen Tai. (Note: (辛未，詔長水校尉鄧艾行安西將軍，與陳泰幷力拒維，戊辰，復以太尉孚為後繼。) Zizhi Tongjian vol. 76.) Wei reinforcements led by Deng Ai, Hu Fen (胡奮) and Wang Mi (王秘) arrived in Shanggui County to join Chen Tai's forces. They split into three groups and advanced towards Longxi Commandery. (Note: (鄧艾、胡奮、王秘亦到，即與艾、祕等分為三軍，進到隴西。) Sanguozhi vol. 22.) Earlier on, Chen Tai had disagreements with the other officers on how to lift the siege on Didao. Deng Ai and the other officers said that the Shu army's morale was high after defeating Wang Jing, so they should retreat first and hold up in a strategic location, while waiting for an opportunity to strike back. (Note: (艾等以為「王經精卒破衂於西，賊衆大盛，乘勝之兵旣不可當，而將軍以烏合之卒，繼敗軍之後，將士失氣，隴右傾蕩。古人有言：『蝮蛇螫手，壯士解其腕。』孫子曰：『兵有所不擊，地有所不守。』蓋小有所失而大有所全故也。今隴右之害，過於蝮蛇，狄道之地，非徒不守之謂。姜維之兵，是所辟之鋒。不如割險自保，觀釁待弊，然後進救，此計之得者也。」) Sanguozhi vol. 22.) Chen Tai, on the other hand, argued that they should launch a swift assault and decisively defeat the Shu army before it could take advantage of its high morale to conquer more Wei territories and garner strong support from the Qiang and Di tribes. (Note: (泰曰：「姜維提輕兵深入， ... ，君等何言如此？」) Sanguozhi vol. 22.) (Note: (泰進軍隴西，諸將皆曰：「王經新敗， ... 此計之得者也。」泰曰：「姜維提輕兵深入， ... 君等何言如是！」) Zizhi Tongjian vol. 76.)

Chen Tai then led his troops across Gaocheng Ridge (高城嶺; northwest of present-day Weiyuan County, Gansu), travelling stealthily day and night, and arrived at the hills southeast of Didao. At the hills, Chen Tai ordered his men to light more fires and beat their war drums loudly to signal to the besieged Wei forces in Didao that reinforcements had arrived. As he expected, the Wei defenders in Didao experienced a surge in their morale, and the Shu forces were taken by surprise. Jiang Wei ordered his troops to retreat. Chen Tai also instructed his men to spread false news that they were planning to cut off the Shu army's retreat route. When Jiang Wei heard about it, he became fearful, (Note: (遂進軍度高城嶺，潛行，夜至狄道東南高山上，多舉烽火，鳴鼓角。狄道城中將士見救者至，皆憤踊。維始謂官救兵當須衆集乃發，而卒聞已至，謂有奇變宿謀，上下震懼。) Sanguozhi vol. 22.) so he withdrew his forces on 11 November. (Note: The Zizhi Tongjian recorded that Jiang Wei retreated on the jiachen day in the 9th month in the 2nd year of the Zhengyuan era of Cao Mao's reign. This date corresponds to 11 November 255 in the Gregorian calendar.) The siege on Didao was thus lifted. (Note: (遂進軍度高城嶺，潛行，夜至狄道東南高山上，多舉烽火，鳴鼓角。狄道城中將士見救至，皆憤踊。維不意救兵卒至，緣山急來攻之，泰與交戰，維退。泰引兵揚言欲向其還路，維懼，九月，甲辰，維遁走，城中將士乃得出。) Zizhi Tongjian vol. 76.) (Note: (經退保狄道城，維圍之。魏征西將軍陳泰進兵解圍，維却住鍾題。) Sanguozhi vol. 44.) (Note: (定軍潛行，卒出其南。維乃緣山突至，泰與交戰，維退還。涼州軍從金城南至沃于阪。泰與經共密期，當共向其還路，維等聞之，遂遁，城中將士得出。) Sanguozhi vol. 22.)

When Chen Tai was retreating back to Longxi Commandery, he predicted that Jiang Wei would attempt to make use of the mountainous terrain along the way to lay an ambush, so he took a southern detour back to Longxi. As he expected, Jiang Wei had indeed sent troops to lie in ambush for three days. (Note: (自軍之發隴西也，以山道深險，賊必設伏。泰詭從南道，維果三日施伏。) Sanguozhi vol. 22.) However, the historian Pei Songzhi pointed out that it made no sense for Jiang Wei to set up the ambush because he did not know that Wei reinforcements would show up when he was besieging Didao so the ambush would not have served its purpose. (Note: (臣松之案：此傳云「謂救兵當須衆集，而卒聞已至，謂有奇變，上下震懼」，此則救至出於不意。若不知救至，何故伏兵深險乃經三日乎？設伏相伺，非不知之謂。此皆語之不通也。) Pei Songzhi's annotation in Sanguozhi vol. 22.)

After the siege on Didao was lifted, Wang Jing sighed in relief: "Our supplies wouldn't have lasted more than 10 days. If reinforcements didn't show up, the city would have fallen to the enemy and the whole province could have been lost." Chen Tai settled the troops and strengthened the defences in the area before returning to the garrison at Shanggui County. (Note: (王經歎曰：「糧不至旬，向非救兵速至，舉城屠裂，覆喪一州矣！」泰慰勞將士，前後遣還，更差軍守，幷治城壘，還屯上邽。) Zizhi Tongjian vol. 76.) Jiang Wei retreated back to Zhongti (鐘堤; south of present-day Lintao County, Gansu). (Note: (姜維退駐鍾提。) Zizhi Tongjian vol. 76.) (Note: (經歎曰：「糧不至旬，向不應機，舉城屠裂，覆喪一州矣。」泰慰勞將士，前後遣還，更差軍守，並治城壘，還屯上邽。) Sanguozhi vol. 22.)

== Ninth expedition (256) ==
While Jiang Wei and the Shu forces retreated to Zhongti (鍾提; south of present-day Lintao County, Gansu), many Wei officers believed that the enemy was already exhausted by then and would not attack them again. (Note: (姜維在鍾提，議者多以為維力已竭，未能更出。) Zizhi Tongjian vol. 77.)

Deng Ai had a different opinion. He said: "The defeat at the west of the Tao River wasn't an insignificant loss. The loss of troops and officers, depletion of stores and reserves, and displacement of refugees are signs pointing towards imminent destruction. I shall explain the situation. First, the enemy is riding on a wave of victories, while we're actually weak. Second, the enemy forces are well-trained and battle-ready, while ours are newly recruited and not well-equipped. Third, the enemy is less tired than us because we travel by land while they travel by water. Fourth, the enemy focuses on attacking Didao only, while we spread our defences across four locations – Didao, Longxi, Nan'an (南安; around present-day Wushan County, Gansu) and Mount Qi (祁山; the mountainous regions around present-day Li County, Gansu). Fifth, Nan'an and Longxi have grain produced by the Qiang people, while there are fields of wheat beyond Mount Qi. The enemy is cunning. They'll definitely come for the wheat." (Note: (安西將軍鄧艾曰：「洮西之敗，非小失也，士卒凋殘，倉廩空虛，百姓流離。今以策言之，彼有乘勝之勢，我有虛弱之實，一也。彼上下相習，五兵犀利，我將易兵新，器仗未復，二也。彼以船行，吾以陸軍，勞逸不同，三也。狄道、隴西、南安、祁山各當有守，彼專為一，我分為四，四也。從南安、隴西因食羌穀，若趣祁山，熟麥千頃，為之外倉。賊有黠計，其來必矣。」) Zizhi Tongjian vol. 77.)

In the autumn of 256, as Deng Ai predicted, Jiang Wei led troops from Zhongti to attack Mount Qi but was repelled by the defences set up by Deng Ai earlier. Jiang Wei then headed to Dong Village (董亭; south of present-day Wushan County, Gansu) while Deng Ai stationed his troops at Mount Wucheng (武城山; in present-day Chencang District, Baoji, Shaanxi). Jiang Wei tried to seize control of the mountainous terrain from Deng Ai, but was driven back. That night, Jiang Wei attempted to cross the Wei River to attack Shanggui (上邽; present-day Tianshui, Gansu). Deng Ai intercepted Jiang Wei at Duan Valley (段谷; southwest of present-day Tianshui, Gansu) and defeated him. (Note: (秋，七月，姜維復率衆出祁山，聞鄧艾已有備，乃回，從董亭趣南安；艾據武城山以拒之。維與艾爭險不克，其夜，渡渭東行，緣山趣上邽，艾與戰於段谷，大破之。) Zizhi Tongjian vol. 77.)

Deng Ai was promoted to General Who Guards the West (鎮西將軍) and put in charge of overseeing military affairs in the region. The reason for Jiang Wei's defeat at Shanggui was the failure of the Shu general Hu Ji to show up in time with reinforcements to assist Jiang Wei. The failure of this ninth expedition resulted in Shu sustaining heavy losses of lives and resources; the people of Shu resented and hated Jiang Wei even more. Jiang Wei wrote a memorial to the Shu imperial court, requesting to be demoted as punishment. The court approved and demoted him to the position of General of the Guards (衞將軍). However, despite his demotion, Jiang Wei was still allowed to act in the capacity of his previous appointment as General-in-Chief (大將軍). (Note: (以艾為鎮西將軍，都督隴右諸軍事。維與其鎮西大將軍胡濟期會上邽，濟失期不至，故敗，士卒星散，死者甚衆，蜀人由是怨維。維上書謝，求自貶黜，乃以衞將軍行大將軍事。) Zizhi Tongjian vol. 77.) (Note: (十九年春，就遷維為大將軍。更整勒戎馬，與鎮西大將軍胡濟期會上邽，濟失誓不至，故維為魏大將鄧艾所破於段谷，星散流離，死者甚衆。衆庶由是怨讟，而隴已西亦騷動不寧，維謝過引負，求自貶削。為後將軍，行大將軍事。) Sanguozhi vol. 44.)

== Tenth expedition (257–258) ==
In 257, when the Wei general Zhuge Dan started a rebellion in Shouchun (壽春; around present-day Shou County, Anhui), the Wei government mobilised troops from the Guanzhong region to suppress the revolt. Jiang Wei wanted to take advantage of the situation to stage another invasion of Wei so he led Shu forces through Luo Valley (駱谷) and Shen Ridge (沈嶺), both located south of present-day Zhouzhi County, Shaanxi, to attack the Wei garrisons near the Great Wall. Around the time, the Wei garrisons had much supplies stored there but were weakly defended. The Wei defenders started panicking when they heard of the Shu army's approach. (Note: (二十年，魏征東大將軍諸葛誕反於淮南，分關中兵東下。維欲乘虛向秦川，復率數萬人出駱谷，徑至沈嶺。時長城積穀甚多而守兵乃少，聞維方到，衆皆惶懼。) Sanguozhi vol. 44.)

The Wei general Sima Wang led his troops to resist the invaders while his colleague Deng Ai led a separate force from Longyou (隴右; around present-day Lintao County, Gansu) to support him. When the Wei forces reached the Great Wall, Jiang Wei ordered his troops to retreat to Mangshui (芒水; southeast of present-day Zhouzhi County, Shaanxi) and set up a camp with its back facing a mountain. Sima Wang and Deng Ai ordered their troops to surround Jiang Wei's camp but refrain from attacking. When Jiang Wei led his men to taunt the Wei forces to attack them, Sima Wang and Deng Ai gave strict orders to their troops to ignore the enemy. (Note: (魏大將軍司馬望拒之，鄧艾亦自隴右，皆軍于長城。維前住芒水，皆倚山為營。望、艾傍渭堅圍，維數下挑戰，望、艾不應。) Sanguozhi vol. 44.) (Note: (漢姜維聞魏分關中兵以赴淮南，欲乘虛向秦川，率數萬人出駱谷，至沈嶺。時長城積穀甚多，而守兵少，征西將軍都督雍、涼諸軍事司馬望及安西將軍鄧艾進兵據之，以拒維。維壁於芒水，數挑戰，望、艾不應。) Zizhi Tongjian vol. 77.)

In 258, after Jiang Wei received news that Wei forces had suppressed Zhuge Dan's rebellion, he withdrew all his forces and returned to the Shu capital, Chengdu. The Shu emperor Liu Shan restored him to the position of General-in-Chief (大將軍). (Note: (景耀元年，維聞誕破敗，乃還成都。) Sanguozhi vol. 44.) (Note: (漢姜維聞諸葛誕死，復還成都，復拜大將軍。) Zizhi Tongjian vol. 77.)

At the time, having seen year after year of military campaigns against Wei, the people of Shu were growing tired of having to endure the costs and effects of war. The Shu official Qiao Zhou wrote the "Chou Guo Lun" (仇國論; "Disquisition on Rivalling States"), a satirical piece criticising Jiang Wei for his warmongering behaviour. (Note: (是時，維數出兵，蜀人愁苦，中散大夫譙周作仇國論以諷之曰：「或問往古能以弱勝強者，其術如何？ ... 如遂極武黷征，土崩勢生，不幸遇難，雖有智者將不能謀之矣。」) Zizhi Tongjian vol. 77.)

== Eleventh expedition (262) ==
In the spring of 262, when Jiang Wei planned to launch another campaign against Wei again, the Shu general Liao Hua remarked: "'One who does not refrain from using military force will end up burning himself.' I am referring to Boyue (Jiang Wei). He is inferior to the enemy in terms of intelligence and military power, yet he keeps attacking them. How can he expect to overcome them?" (Note: (漢大將軍姜維將出軍，右車騎將軍廖化曰：「兵不戢，必自焚，伯約之謂也。智不出敵而力小於寇，用之無厭，將何以存！」) Zizhi Tongjian vol. 78.)

In winter, Jiang Wei occupied Taoyang County (洮陽縣; in present-day Lintao County, Gansu) and attacked the Wei general Deng Ai at Houhe County (侯和縣) but lost the battle. He retreated to Tazhong (沓中; northwest of present-day Zhugqu County, Gansu) and garrisoned there. (Note: (五年春正月， ... 是歲，姜維復率衆出侯和，為鄧艾所破，還住沓中。) Sanguozhi vol. 33.) (Note: (冬，十月，維入寇洮陽，鄧艾與戰於侯和，破之，維退住沓中。) Zizhi Tongjian vol. 78.)

== Aftermath ==
While Jiang Wei was aggressively leading Shu forces to attack Wei year after year, the campaigns had taken a toll on Shu's resources but failed to yield any significant gains. In the years after the death of the Shu chancellor Dong Yun in 246, the eunuch Huang Hao came to power and indirectly controlled the Shu government. Huang Hao wanted to remove Jiang Wei from his position of power and replace him with Yan Yu (閻宇), whom he favoured. When Jiang Wei heard about it, he wrote to the Shu emperor Liu Shan to accuse Huang Hao of corruption and treachery, and urge Liu Shan to execute Huang Hao. However, Liu Shan replied, "Huang Hao is merely a minor official. In the past, I hated it when he got into conflict with Dong Yun. Why should you mind him?" Jiang Wei saw that Huang Hao had many supporters in the imperial court and realised that he had gotten himself into trouble when he openly denounced Huang Hao. Hence, he decided to retreat to Tazhong and garrison there instead of returning to the capital, Chengdu. (Note: (初，維以羈旅依漢，身受重任，興兵累年，功績不立。黃皓用事於中，與右大將軍閻宇親善，陰欲廢維樹宇。維知之，言於漢主曰：「皓姦巧專恣，將敗國家，請殺之！」漢主曰：「皓趨走小臣耳，往董允每切齒，吾常恨之，君何足介意！」維見皓枝附葉連，懼於失言，遜辭而出。漢主敕皓詣維陳謝。維由是自疑懼，返自洮陽，因求種麥沓中，不敢歸成都。) Zizhi Tongjian vol. 78.) (Note: (五年，維率衆出漢、侯和，為鄧艾所破，還住沓中。維本羈旅託國，累年攻戰，功績不立，而宦臣黃皓等弄權於內，右大將軍閻宇與皓恊比，而皓陰欲廢維樹宇。維亦疑之。故自危懼，不復還成都。) Sanguozhi vol. 44.) (Note: (華陽國志曰；維惡黃皓恣擅，啟後主欲殺之。後主曰：「皓趨走小臣耳，往董允切齒，吾常恨之，君何足介意！」維見皓枝附葉連，懼於失言，遜辭而出。後主勑皓詣維陳謝。維說皓求沓中種麥，以避內逼爾。) Huayang Guo Zhi annotation in Sanguozhi vol. 44.)

In 262, the Wei regent Sima Zhao had the intention of launching a campaign to conquer Shu. In 263, three separate Wei armies led by Zhong Hui, Deng Ai and Zhuge Xu invaded Shu. While Jiang Wei led Shu forces to hold off Zhong Hui and Zhuge Xu's forces at the mountain pass Jiange (劍閣; in present-day Jiange County, Sichuan), the Wei army led by Deng Ai took a more dangerous route across mountainous terrain, bypassed Shu's defences, and showed up at the Shu capital, Chengdu. The Shu emperor Liu Shan, having been taken by surprise, voluntarily surrendered to Deng Ai, thus bringing an end to the Shu state's existence.

== In Romance of the Three Kingdoms ==
The expeditions are covered in chapters 107, 109–115 in the 14th-century historical novel Romance of the Three Kingdoms, which dramatises and romanticises the events before and during the Three Kingdoms period. They were referred to as the "nine campaigns on the Central Plains" (九伐中原). This description is inaccurate because historically there were eleven campaigns instead of nine, and the battles were fought in locations far from the Central Plains.
