= Zhang Yi (Bogong) =

General of the state of Shu Han (died 264)

- 張翼
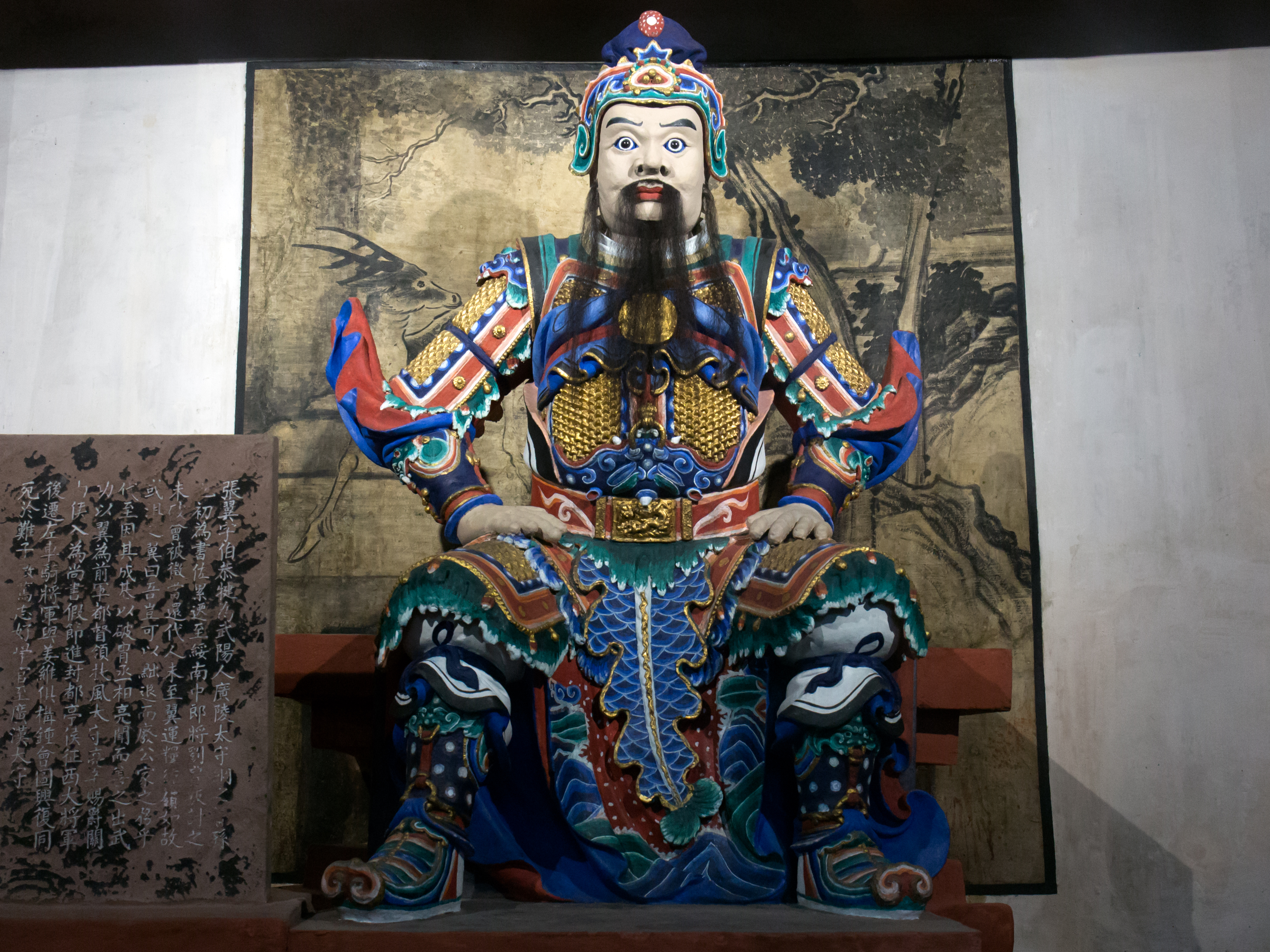
- Statue of Zhang Yi in a temple in Chengdu, Sichuan

Left General of Chariots and Cavalry (左車騎將軍)
- In office 259 – 263
- Monarch: Liu Shan

Inspector of Ji Province (冀州刺史) (nominal)
- In office 259 – 263
- Monarch: Liu Shan

Senior General Who Guards the South (鎮南大將軍)
- In office 255 – 259
- Monarch: Liu Shan

Senior General Who Attacks the West (征西大將軍)
- In office ? – 259
- Monarch: Liu Shan

Master of Writing (尚書)
- In office 238 – ?
- Monarch: Liu Shan

Vanguard Army Commander (前領軍)
- In office 234 – 238
- Monarch: Liu Shan

Administrator of Fufeng (扶風太守) (nominal)
- In office 234 – 234
- Monarch: Liu Shan
- Chancellor: Zhuge Liang

General of the Household Who Pacifies the South (綏南中郎將)
- In office 231 – 234
- Monarch: Liu Shan
- Chancellor: Zhuge Liang

Area Commander of Laixiang (庲降都督)
- In office 231 – 234
- Monarch: Liu Shan
- Chancellor: Zhuge Liang
- Preceded by: Li Hui

Personal details
- Born: Unknown Pengshan District, Meishan, Sichuan
- Died: 3 March 264 (Note: Zhong Hui's biography in the Sanguozhi recorded that his mutiny took place on the 18th day of the 1st month of the 1st year of the Xianxi era of Cao Huan's reign. This date corresponds to 3 March 264 in the Gregorian calendar.) Chengdu, Sichuan
- Relations: Zhang Liang (ancestor)
- Children: Zhang Wei
- Occupation: Military general, politician
- Courtesy name: Bogong (伯恭)
- Peerage: Marquis of a Chief Village (都亭侯)

Zhang Yi (died 3 March 264), courtesy name Bogong, was a Chinese military general and politician of the state of Shu Han during the Three Kingdoms period of China.

Born in the late Eastern Han dynasty, Zhang Yi was a 10th-generation descendant of Zhang Liang. (Note: Zhang Yi's great-great-grandfather, Zhang Hao, was a sixth-generation descendant of Zhang Liang. Therefore, Zhang Yi was a 10th-generation descendant of Zhang Liang.) He started his career as a scribe under the warlord Liu Bei, who founded Shu later, and gradually rose to the positions of a county prefect and commandery administrator. In the early 230s, he served as an area commander tasked with maintaining the peace in Shu's southern commanderies.

In 234, he led the Shu vanguard during the Battle of Wuzhang Plains against Shu's rival state Wei. From 238 to 259, Zhang Yi steadily rose through the ranks to become one of Shu's top generals. During this time, although he strongly opposed the Shu general Jiang Wei's aggressive stance towards Wei, he still accompanied Jiang Wei on his military campaigns against Wei.

In 263, he surrendered to Wei forces along with the Shu emperor Liu Shan when Wei launched a large-scale invasion of Shu. In the following year, Zhang Yi was killed by mutineers during a rebellion by the Wei general Zhong Hui. Like Liao Hua and Zong Yu, Zhang was one of few officials who served the Shu-Han state throughout its entire existence.

== Family background ==
Zhang Yi was born sometime in the late Eastern Han dynasty in Wuyang County (武陽縣), Jianwei Commandery (犍為郡), which is present-day Pengshan District, Meishan, Sichuan. He was a 10th-generation descendant of Zhang Liang, a strategist and statesman who served under Liu Bang (Emperor Gao), the founding emperor of the Han dynasty. His great-great-grandfather Zhang Hao (張晧; 50-132) and great-grandfather Zhang Gang (張綱; 98-143) served as the Minister of Works and Administrator of Guangling Commandery respectively during the reign of Emperor Shun of the Eastern Han dynasty.

== Early career ==
In 214, after the warlord Liu Bei seized control of Yi Province (covering present-day Sichuan and Chongqing) from Liu Zhang and became the new provincial Governor, he employed Zhang Yi to serve as a scribe (書佐) in his office.

Towards the end of the Jian'an era (196–220) of the Eastern Han dynasty, Zhang Yi was nominated as a xiaolian (civil service candidate) and subsequently appointed as the Chief of Jiangyang County (江陽縣; present-day Luzhou, Sichuan). He was later reassigned to be the Prefect of Fuling County (涪陵縣; present-day Pengshui County, Chongqing), and subsequently promoted to the rank of commandery administrator. He consecutively served as the Administrator of Zitong (梓潼; around present-day Zitong County, Sichuan), Guanghan (廣漢; around present-day Guanghan, Sichuan) and Shu (蜀; around present-day Chengdu, Sichuan) commanderies.

Zhang Yi served as a subordinate of Zhao Yun during the Hanzhong Campaign where they scored a major victory against Cao Cao's forces at the Battle of Han River with many of the enemy soldiers being killed during their retreat.

== As an area commander ==
In 231, the Shu government commissioned Zhang Yi as General of the Household Who Pacifies the South (綏南中郎將) and appointed him as the Area Commander of Laixiang to replace Li Hui, who went to serve in Zhuge Liang's Northern Campaign in Hanzhong, (庲降都督), putting him in charge of maintaining the peace in Shu's southern lands (covering parts of present-day southern Sichuan, Guizhou and Yunnan). Zhang proved to be unpopular compared to his predecessor as he lacked the flexibility to adapt the Shu code of law to local conditions in his jurisdictions, he became very unpopular among the masses.

In 233, when a local tribal chief Liu Zhou (劉胄) started a rebellion, Zhang Yi rallied his troops and prepared to attack the rebels. However, before Zhang Yi managed to quell the revolt, the Shu central government summoned him to the capital Chengdu. When his subordinates urged him to follow orders and go to Chengdu immediately, Zhang Yi refused and said:

"No. I have been recalled to Chengdu because I failed in my duty to prevent the barbarians from rebelling. However, as my successor has yet to arrive and because we are near the war zone, I should make preparations for stockpiling and transporting supplies so as to ensure that my successor will have adequate resources to quell the revolt. How can I neglect my role in public affairs just because I have been relieved of my command?"

Zhang Yi then directed his troops to transport supplies to a staging area for the troops and kept them on high alert until his successor, Ma Zhong, arrived. Due to Zhang Yi's earlier efforts, Ma Zhong was able to successfully defeat Liu Zhou and suppress the revolt. Zhang Yi's actions earned him praise from Zhuge Liang, the Imperial Chancellor of Shu.

== Battles against Wei ==
=== Battle of Wuzhang Plains ===
In 234, Zhang Yi served as the Chief Controller of the Vanguard (前軍都督) when Zhuge Liang led Shu forces to attack Shu's rival state Wei for the fifth time since 228. Zhuge Liang also appointed him as the nominal Administrator of Fufeng Commandery (扶風郡; around present-day Xingping, Shaanxi), which was under Wei control.

Following Zhuge Liang's death later that year during the Battle of Wuzhang Plains, Zhang Yi was appointed as Vanguard Army Commander (前領軍). He also received a peerage as a Secondary Marquis (關內侯) for his contributions during the battle, as well as for his earlier efforts in helping Ma Zhong suppress Liu Zhou's rebellion.

=== Guarding Jianwei ===
In 238, Zhang Yi was reassigned to the Shu capital Chengdu to serve as a Master of Writing (尚書) in the imperial secretariat. Within a short period of time, he was sent back to the frontline to serve as the Area Commander of Jianwei (建威; in present-day Longnan, Gansu) near the Wei–Shu border. In addition to his new appointment, he was granted acting imperial authority, promoted to Senior General Who Attacks the West (征西大將軍), and had his marquis rank increased from that of a Secondary Marquis to a Marquis of a Chief Village (都亭侯).

=== Battle of Didao ===
In 255, Zhang Yi returned to the Shu capital Chengdu for a discussion on Shu general Jiang Wei's plan to launch another invasion of Wei. During the discussion in the imperial court, Zhang Yi strongly objected to Jiang Wei's plan and pointed out that Shu lacked the resources to go to war and that the people were already tired of war. Jiang Wei ignored him and proceeded with his plan. He reassigned Zhang Yi to the position of Senior General Who Guards the South (鎮南大將軍) and ordered him to participate in the campaign.

Jiang Wei attacked Wang Jing, the Wei governor of Yong Province, at Didao (狄道; present-day Lintao County, Gansu) and inflicted a crushing defeat on the enemy. Tens of thousands of Wei soldiers fled after their defeat and drowned in the nearby Tao River. At that point in time, Zhang Yi advised Jiang Wei: "It's time to stop. We shouldn't advance any further, or we'll risk losing everything we have gained so far." When Jiang Wei turned furious, Zhang Yi told him that advancing further would be equivalent to "adding legs to a snake." (Note: The phrase "adding legs to a snake" is derived from a Chinese idiom, hua she tian zu (畫蛇添足; 'draw a snake and add legs to it'). The idiom story says that a man who participated in a snake drawing contest finished before the time was up. However, instead of submitting his drawing, he decided to use the remaining time to add four legs to his snake. He lost the contest eventually. This idiom is used to describe people doing unnecessary things and ending up ruining what they set out to do in the first place.)

Jiang Wei did not heed Zhang Yi's warning and continued to besiege Wang Jing at Didao but failed to breach Didao's walls. Upon learning that Wei reinforcements led by Chen Tai were approaching Didao, Jiang Wei gave up on the fortress and retreated to Zhongti (鐘堤; south of present-day Lintao County, Gansu).

Although Zhang Yi strongly disagreed with Jiang Wei's aggressive stance towards Wei and did not get along well with him, Jiang Wei still brought him along on his military campaigns against Wei. Zhang Yi also reluctantly participated in the campaigns.

In 259, the Shu emperor Liu Shan promoted Zhang Yi to the position of Left General of Chariots and Cavalry (左車騎將軍) and appointed him as the nominal Inspector of Ji Province.

== Death ==
In 263, the Wei regent Sima Zhao ordered his generals Zhong Hui, Deng Ai and others to lead a large-scale invasion of Shu from three fronts. In response to the Wei invasion, the Shu generals Jiang Wei, Zhang Yi, Liao Hua, Dong Jue and others led their troops to resist the invaders. Zhang Yi and Dong Jue received orders to guard Yang'an Pass (陽安關; a.k.a. Yangping Pass 陽平關; in present-day Ningqiang County, Shaanxi) and provide backup on the external perimeter.

Zhang Yi later joined Jiang Wei and Liao Hua at the heavily fortified mountain pass Jiange to resist the Wei army led by Zhong Hui. In the winter of 263, the Shu emperor Liu Shan surrendered when the Wei army led by Deng Ai showed up unexpectedly outside Chengdu after taking a detour across dangerous terrain. As a result of Liu Shan's surrender, the Shu state's existence came to an end and it became part of Wei. After learning of Liu Shan's surrender, Zhang Yi and the other Shu generals at Jiange formally surrendered to Zhong Hui at Fu County (涪縣; present-day Mianyang, Sichuan).

Zhang Yi returned to Chengdu on 29 February 264 with Zhong Hui and the others. Over the next few days, with Jiang Wei's support, Zhong Hui plotted a rebellion against the Wei regent Sima Zhao. On 3 March, a mutiny broke out when some of Zhong Hui's officers who were unwilling to participate in the rebellion turned against their superior and killed him and Jiang Wei. Zhang Yi also lost his life during the chaos.

== Family ==
Zhang Yi's son, Zhang Wei (張微), was known for being ambitious and studious since he was young. He served as the Administrator of Guanghan Commandery (廣漢郡; around present-day Guanghan, Sichuan) during the Jin dynasty.

== See also ==
- Lists of people of the Three Kingdoms
