= Zong Yu =

Chinese general and diplomat (died 264)

- 宗預

Senior General Who Guards the Army (鎮軍大將軍)
- In office 258 – 263
- Monarch: Liu Shan

Inspector of Yan Province (兗州刺史) (nominal)
- In office 258 – 263
- Monarch: Liu Shan

Senior General Who Attacks the West (征西大將軍)
- In office ? – 258
- Monarch: Liu Shan

General of the Rear (後將軍)
- In office ? – 258
- Monarch: Liu Shan

Colonel of the Garrison Cavalry (屯騎校尉)
- In office 247 – ?
- Monarch: Liu Shan

Master of Writing (尚書)
- In office ? – 247
- Monarch: Liu Shan

Palace Attendant (侍中)
- In office ?–?
- Monarch: Liu Shan

Personal details
- Born: Unknown Dengzhou, Henan
- Died: 264
- Occupation: General, diplomat
- Courtesy name: Deyan (德豔)
- Peerage: Secondary Marquis (關內侯)

Zong Yu (d.264), courtesy name Deyan, was a military general and diplomat of the state of Shu Han during the Three Kingdoms period of China. Like Liao Hua and Zhang Yi, Zong was one of few officials who served the Shu-Han state throughout its entire existence.

== Early career ==
Zong Yu was born in the late Eastern Han dynasty in Anzhong County (安眾縣), Nanyang Commandery (南陽郡), which is around present-day Dengzhou, Henan.

In 214, Zong Yu followed the general Zhang Fei into Yi Province (covering present-day Sichuan and Chongqing) to serve as reinforcements for the warlord Liu Bei, who was fighting for control over Yi Province with the provincial governor Liu Zhang.

After the fall of the Eastern Han dynasty, Zong Yu served in the state of Shu, which Liu Bei established in 221 to challenge the legitimacy of the Wei state that replaced the Eastern Han dynasty in 220. In the early Jianxing era (223–237) of Liu Shan's reign, Zhuge Liang, the Imperial Chancellor of Shu, appointed Zong Yu as his Registrar (主簿) and later made him an Army Adviser (參軍) and Right General of the Household (右中郎將).

== Diplomatic trips to Wu ==
Following Zhuge Liang's death in 234, Shu's ally state Wu worried that Wei would take advantage of the situation to attack Shu, so it sent an additional 10,000 troops to the Wu garrison at Baqiu (巴丘; present-day Yueyang, Hunan) for two purposes: 1) to reinforce Shu in the event of a Wei invasion and 2) seize Shu territories if Shu cannot defend itself against Wei. When the Shu government received intelligence of the increased Wu military presence at Baqiu, they immediately strengthened their defences at Yong'an (永安; present-day Fengjie County, Chongqing) near the Wu–Shu border to prepare for unforeseen circumstances.

Shu later sent Zong Yu as their emissary to meet the Wu emperor Sun Quan, who asked him: "The east (Wu) and west (Shu) are like one family. I heard that the west has strengthened their defences at Baidicheng. Why is that so?" Zong Yu replied: "I think it is normal for the west to strengthen its defences at Baidicheng, just as it is normal for the east to send more troops to Baqiu. That's why I don't think it is a cause for concern." Sun Quan laughed and praised Zong Yu for making such a bold and candid reply. Among the Shu diplomats who visited Wu, Zong Yu was second only to Deng Zhi and Fei Yi in terms of how highly Sun Quan favoured and regarded him.

Zong Yu was later reassigned to be a Palace Attendant (侍中) and promoted to serve as a Master of Writing (尚書) in the imperial secretariat. In 247, he was appointed as a Colonel of the Garrison Cavalry (屯騎校尉).

Some time later, Zong Yu made another diplomatic visit to Wu and met Sun Quan again. Before he left, Sun Quan held his hand and tearfully told him: "For many years, you have undertaken the task of strengthening ties between our two states. Now, both of us are old and frail already. I am afraid we might not see each other again!" Zong Yu also told Sun Quan: "Shu is small and isolated. Although they are neighbours in name, the east and west are actually dependent on each other. Wu cannot do without Shu; Shu also cannot do without Wu. I hope that Your Majesty will bear in mind that rulers and subjects need each other." He then described himself as "old and sickly" and expressed his worries that he might not see Sun Quan again. Sun Quan gave Zong Yu one hu of large pearls as a parting gift.

== Standing up to Deng Zhi ==
In 247, when the Shu general Deng Zhi returned to the capital Chengdu to assume his new appointment as General of Chariots of Cavalry (車騎將軍), he met Zong Yu on his way to the imperial court and asked him: "According to the rules of propriety, a man should no longer serve in the military once he reaches 60. Why do you still want to receive command of troops at this age?" Zong Yu rebuked him: "You are already 70, but you haven't relinquished your command of troops. So why can't I receive command of troops when I am 60?"

Deng Zhi's colleagues, including his superior General-in-Chief Fei Yi, tended to give in to his arrogant and condescending attitude. Zong Yu was the only person who stood up to him.

== Later career and death ==
After he returned from his last diplomatic trip to Wu, Zong Yu was promoted to General of the Rear (後將軍) and put in charge of guarding Yong'an (永安; present-day Fengjie County, Chongqing) near the Wu–Shu border. He was later further promoted to Senior General Who Attacks the West (征西大將軍) and awarded a peerage as a Secondary Marquis (關內侯).

In 258, Zong Yu was recalled to Chengdu due to poor health. Later, he was reassigned to the position of Senior General Who Guards the Army (鎮軍大將軍) and appointed as the nominal Inspector of Yan Province (兖州刺史).

Around 261, when Zhuge Liang's son Zhuge Zhan took charge of the Shu central government, Liao Hua asked Zong Yu to accompany him to visit Zhuge Zhan. Zong Yu refused and told Liao Hua: "Both of us are already above the age of 70. All that we desire have passed. Nothing but death remains for us. Why bother to seek favours from the younger generation by paying calls for trivial issues?"

Shu's existence came to an end in 263 when the Shu emperor Liu Shan surrendered to Shu's rival state Wei following a Wei invasion of Shu. In the following year, Zong Yu and Liao Hua received orders to relocate to the Wei imperial capital Luoyang but they died from illness during the journey.

== See also ==
- Lists of people of the Three Kingdoms
