= Sao Mi Zhou =

Chinese serial novel

Sao Mi Zhou (simplified Chinese: 扫迷帚; traditional Chinese: 掃迷帚; pinyin: sǎo mí zhǒu; lit. 'The broom that sweeps away superstition') is a Chinese serial novel in 24 installments published in 1903 under the pseudonym Zhuàngzhě (壯者; lit. "strong man"). The word "superstition" (Chinese: 迷信; pinyin: míxìn) had just been introduced in the Chinese language (from Japanese) a few years earlier by Liang Qichao. The novel attempted to convince people to oppose traditional Chinese religious ideas, which the author saw as backward and an obstacle to progress. Most of the novel is built around a discussion on the topic between two brothers.
