= Wang Jing (Three Kingdoms) =

Chinese Cao Wei state official (died 260)

- 王經
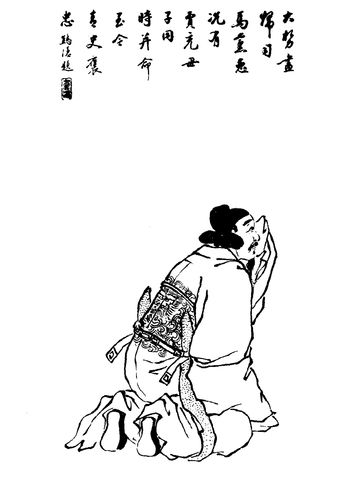
- A Qing dynasty illustration of Wang Jing

Master of Writing (尚書)
- In office 255 – 260
- Monarch: Cao Mao

Colonel-Director of Retainers (司隸校尉)
- In office 255 – 260
- Monarch: Cao Mao

Inspector of Yong Province (雍州刺史)
- In office ? – 255
- Monarch: Cao Fang / Cao Mao

Administrator of Jiangxia (江夏太守)
- In office ?–?

Personal details
- Born: Unknown Linqing, Shandong
- Died: c.June 260 Luoyang, Henan
- Occupation: Politician
- Courtesy name: Yanwei (彦緯)

Wang Jing (died c.June 260), courtesy name Yanwei, was a Chinese politician of the state of Cao Wei during the Three Kingdoms period of China.

== Life ==
Wang Jing was born in a peasant family in Qinghe Commandery (清河郡), which is around present-day Linqing, Shandong. He was nominated by the official Cui Lin, who was also from Qinghe Commandery, to serve in the Wei government. His mother once said that it was not a good sign if he got promoted very fast in his career. However, Wang Jing still rose through the ranks in the civil service quickly. He held office as the Administrator (太守) of Jiangxia Commandery (江夏郡; around present-day Xinzhou District, Wuhan, Hubei) and later as the Inspector (刺史) of Yong Province.

In 255, when Jiang Wei, a general from Wei's rival state Shu Han, led the Shu forces to attack Wei's Longxi Commandery (隴西郡; roughly present-day southern and southeastern Gansu), Wang Jing led a Wei army from Didao (狄道; present-day Lintao County, Gansu) to engage the enemy but was defeated. Wang Jing ended up being besieged by Shu forces in Didao. The siege was lifted when the Wei generals Chen Tai and Deng Ai showed up with reinforcements and drove the enemy back. Wang Jing was recalled from Yong Province to the Wei imperial court in Luoyang and reassigned to be the Colonel-Director of Retainers (司隸校尉) and a Master of Writing (尚書).

In 260, the Wei emperor Cao Mao summoned Wang Jing, Wang Chen and Wang Ye to meet him in private and discuss plans to launch a coup to seize back power from the regent Sima Zhao. (Note: The Wei Jin Shiyu recorded that before Wang Chen and Wang Ye went to Sima Zhao, they revealed their intentions to Wang Jing; Jing refused to join them due to his uprightness. The Jin Zhugong Zan had a different account: it recorded that as Chen and Ye were about to leave Jing, they called out to the latter. Jing refused to join them, saying, "You two should be on your way!" In vol.03 of Zizhi Tongjian Kaoyi, Sima Guang indicated that Tongjian adopted the account found in Jin Zhugong Zan.) Cao Mao did not heed Wang Jing's suggestion and proceeded with the coup, but ended up being assassinated by Sima Zhao's men. After Cao Mao's death, Sima Zhao had Wang Jing and his mother arrested and executed.

In 266, after Sima Yan (Emperor Wu) ended the state of Wei and established the Jin dynasty, he issued an imperial decree to express sympathy for Wang Jing and his family. He appointed Wang Jing's grandson as a Gentleman Attendant (郎中).

== See also ==
- Lists of people of the Three Kingdoms
