= Chen Tai =

Chinese general and politician (died 260)

- 陳泰

Left Supervisor of the Masters of Writing (尚書左僕射)
- In office 256 – 260
- Monarch: Cao Mao

General Who Guards the Army (鎮軍將軍)
- In office 256
- Monarch: Cao Mao

Right Supervisor of the Masters of Writing (尚書右僕射)
- In office 255 – 256
- Monarch: Cao Mao

General Who Attacks the West (征西將軍)
- In office 255
- Monarch: Cao Mao

General of Vehement Might (奮威將軍)
- In office 249 – 255
- Monarch: Cao Fang / Cao Mao

Inspector of Yong Province (雍州刺史)
- In office 249 – 255
- Monarch: Cao Fang / Cao Mao

Personal details
- Born: Unknown
- Died: c.June 260 (Note: Chen Tai's biography in the Sanguozhi recorded that he died in the 1st year of the Jingyuan era (260–264) of Cao Huan's reign.)
- Relations: see Chen family of Yingchuan and Xun family of Yingchuan
- Children: Chen Xun; Chen Wen
- Parents: Chen Qun (father); Xun Yu's daughter (mother)
- Occupation: General, official
- Courtesy name: Xuanbo (玄伯)
- Posthumous name: Marquis Mu (穆侯)
- Peerage: Marquis of Yingyin (潁陰侯)

Chen Tai (died c.June 260 (Note: Chen Tai died soon after Cao Mao's death, which was on 2 June 260. Thus, Chen Tai's death date should be in mid- or late-June 260.)), courtesy name Xuanbo, was a military general and official of the state of Cao Wei during the Three Kingdoms period of China. He was a son of Chen Qun and a maternal grandson of Xun Yu. (Note: Xun Yi's biography in the Jin Shu mentioned that Xun Yi was a younger brother-in-law of Chen Qun and the Jin Ji (晉紀) by Gan Bao mentioned that Chen Tai was Xun Yi's maternal nephew. Chen Tai was Chen Qun's son. By deductive reasoning, Chen Qun must have married a daughter of Xun Yu and their son was Chen Tai.) Chen Tai was very knowledgeable in the art of war, and so led his men as if they were his own children. When the regent Sima Shi began abusing his power and the emperor Cao Mao died under very suspicious circumstances, Chen Tai expressed his deep loyalty to the Cao Wei state by donning mourning garments at Cao Mao's funeral.

== Early life ==
As a scion of two of Wei's most powerful families (the Chen and Xun families), Chen Tai grew up with the sons of other prominent political families such as the Sima family. He was a good friend of Sima Shi and Sima Zhao, who later became the regents and de facto rulers of Wei. After he reached adulthood, he was appointed as the Inspector of Bing Province in 244. There, he fought off raids from the Xianbei tribes and became known as a skilled military leader. At some point during all of this, some officials attempted to bribe him to buy slaves from the tribes, but Chen Tai refused and returned their money. When he was recalled back to the imperial capital Luoyang in 249, Sima Yi had just seized power in a coup against his co-regent, Cao Shuang. Chen Tai was one of several officials who sent letters to Cao Shuang, asking him to give up and surrender to Sima Yi. Cao Shuang did so and was executed along with most of his clan/inner circle later as part of Sima Yi's plan to gain complete control over the Wei government.

== Going west and battles with Shu ==
With Cao Shuang eliminated, the Sima family become more powerful in Wei and completely monopolised state power. Chen Tai initially favoured the changes in the political environment as he believed that Sima Yi was far more capable as a regent than Cao Shuang. However, he felt uneasy about the growing influence of the Sima family and became torn between his loyalties to the Wei emperor Cao Fang and the regent Sima Yi. To avoid getting caught up in the political rivalries, he requested to be transferred to the western border to guard against invasions by Wei's rival state, Shu Han. The Wei government commissioned him as a general and appointed him as the Inspector of Yong Province, replacing Guo Huai.

In the autumn of 249, the Shu general Jiang Wei led the Shu army to invade Wei's western border. Seeing that Jiang Wei had constructed a fortress at Mount Chu and incited several Qiang tribes to rebel against Wei rule in the neighbouring counties, Chen Tai asked his supervisor, the veteran Wei general Guo Huai, to lead an attack on the fort to cut them off from Jiang Wei's main army. He pointed out that although the fortress at Mount Chu was strong, it was also far from the Shu base and it would be easy to cut off the supply route. Guo Huai, along with Chen Tai and Deng Ai, led the Wei forces to besiege the Shu camp at Mount Chu. They cut off the supply route without difficulty. Acting on Chen Tai's advice, Guo Huai also led his army to occupy Mount Niutou, blocking Jiang Wei's retreat route and cutting him off from his supply routes. Jiang Wei and the Shu forces retreated, abandoning the soldiers at Mount Chu, who quickly surrendered.

Later, in May or June 253, Jiang Wei led the Shu forces to attack Wei territory and besieged the Wei garrison at Didao. At the same time, Zhuge Ke, a general from Wei's other rival state Eastern Wu, also led the Wu forces to attack Wei's eastern border. Jiang Wei hoped that Zhuge Ke would help him divert away the Wei forces' attention to the east and allow him to gain a foothold in the west. However, Guo Huai and Chen Tai led the Wei forces to attack Jiang Wei and managed to lift the siege on Didao, forcing Jiang Wei to withdraw again.

After Guo Huai died in February 255, Chen Tai succeeded him and took charge of military affairs in the Guanzhong region. During this time, Jiang Wei led the Shu forces to attack Wei and aimed to capture Didao. Chen Tai ordered Wang Jing, the Inspector of Yong Province, to defend Didao and guard the fortress while waiting for reinforcements. However, Wang Jing, in his eager to gain glory, led the troops out of Didao to attack the enemy at Gu Pass, where he suffered a defeat and was forced to return to Didao with only 10,000 men. Wang Jing then focused on defending Didao, as Chen Tai instructed him. Upon hearing news of Wang Jing's defeat, Chen Tai quickly mobilised his troops to come to Wang Jing's aid. However, he was also worried that Jiang Wei would use the opportunity to attack the Wei army's supply depot at Liyang in the east, and that Jiang Wei would recruit the Qiang tribesmen to join the Shu army and pose an even greater threat. To his relief, Jiang Wei did not do so and instead concentrated his attacks on Didao and besieged the fortress. Wei forces led by Deng Ai, Wang Mi (王秘) and Hu Fen came to join Chen Tai's army. Jiang Wei predicted correctly that Wei reinforcements would come to Didao, so he had ordered some units to ambush the reinforcements when they showed up. However, Chen Tai and his army took another route through the mountainous terrain and arrived in the hills southeast of Didao, completely bypassing the other route laden with ambushes. Jiang Wei attacked Chen Tai on the hills but Chen Tai drove him back easily because the mountainous terrain was to his advantage. As more Wei reinforcements approached Didao, Jiang Wei realised that the siege could not last any longer so he pulled back the Shu forces and retreated to Zhongti by October or November 255.

== Later life and death ==
In 256, the Wei government recalled Chen Tai from the western border back to the imperial capital, Luoyang, leaving the general Deng Ai in charge of defending the border. In Luoyang, Chen Tai first served as the Right Supervisor of the Masters of Writing (i.e. the Imperial Secretariat) under the administration of the regent Sima Zhao. In 257, when the Wei general Zhuge Dan started a rebellion in Shouchun (present-day Shou County, Anhui), Sima Zhao left Chen Tai in charge of the central headquarters while he led Wei imperial forces to suppress the rebellion. Chen Tai also helped to coordinate the various Wei armies which had been mobilised from throughout the Wei Empire to assist Sima Zhao in crushing the revolt. The rebellion was completely suppressed by early 258.

In June 260, the Wei emperor Cao Mao launched a coup in an attempt to seize back power from the regent Sima Zhao, but failed and ended up being assassinated by Cheng Ji, an officer serving under Jia Chong, one of Sima Zhao's close aides. Chen Tai tried to rush to the scene to defuse tensions, but he showed up too late. Upon seeing Cao Mao's dead body, he wept and refused to attend imperial court sessions as a protest against the emperor's assassination. However, he relented and returned to work after Sima Fu, a highly respected Wei official and uncle of Sima Zhao, persuaded him to do so. Jia Chong took responsibility for Cao Mao's death but Sima Zhao spared him and had Cheng Ji executed instead; Chen Tai strongly opposed Sima Zhao's decision and urged him to execute Jia Chong but the regent refused. (Note: Gan Bao's Jin Ji recorded a similar anecdote, which was used by Pei Songzhi in his annotations. Pei Songzhi pointed out that Chen Tai was not tai'chang (as recorded in Jin Ji) at the time. He also expressed skepticism at Sun Sheng's account in Wei Shi Chunqiu. Vol.77 of Zizhi Tongjian followed the account in Jin Ji (as confirmed by Sima Guang in vol.03 of Zizhi Tongjian Kaoyi), and did not indicate Chen Tai's death.) Chen Tai died in distress not long later. (Note: This account is per Wei Shi Chunqiu. Chen Tai's biography in the original Sanguozhi only recorded that he died in the 1st year of the Jing'yuan era, without mentioning other details or his reaction to Cao Mao's death. The record in Han Jin Chun Qiu was that Chen Tai urged Sima Zhao to kill Jia Chong; when Zhao refused, Tai committed suicide when he returned to his residence.)

== See also ==
- Lists of people of the Three Kingdoms
