= Lists of people of the Three Kingdoms =

The following are lists of people significant to the Three Kingdoms period (220–280 CE) of Chinese history. Their names in Mandarin pinyin are sorted in alphabetical order.

Fictional characters in the 14th-century historical novel Romance of the Three Kingdoms and those found in other cultural references to the Three Kingdoms are listed separately in List of fictional people of the Three Kingdoms.

== Lists ==
- List of people of the Three Kingdoms (A)
- List of people of the Three Kingdoms (B)
- List of people of the Three Kingdoms (C)
- List of people of the Three Kingdoms (D)
- List of people of the Three Kingdoms (E)
- List of people of the Three Kingdoms (F)
- List of people of the Three Kingdoms (G)
- List of people of the Three Kingdoms (H)
- List of people of the Three Kingdoms (I)
- List of people of the Three Kingdoms (J)
- List of people of the Three Kingdoms (K)
- List of people of the Three Kingdoms (L)
- List of people of the Three Kingdoms (M)
- List of people of the Three Kingdoms (N)
- List of people of the Three Kingdoms (O)
- List of people of the Three Kingdoms (P)
- List of people of the Three Kingdoms (Q)
- List of people of the Three Kingdoms (R)
- List of people of the Three Kingdoms (S)
- List of people of the Three Kingdoms (T)
- List of people of the Three Kingdoms (U)
- List of people of the Three Kingdoms (V)
- List of people of the Three Kingdoms (W)
- List of people of the Three Kingdoms (X)
- List of people of the Three Kingdoms (Y)
- List of people of the Three Kingdoms (Z)

== Notes ==
The states of Cao Wei, Shu Han, and Eastern Wu were officially established in 220, 221, and 229 respectively. Therefore, certain people in the list who died before these years have their respective lords' names, in place of either of the three states, listed in the allegiance column. Take Guan Yu for example — he died before Liu Bei established Shu Han in 221, so his allegiance is listed as "Liu Bei" instead of "Shu Han".

== See also ==
- List of fictional people of the Three Kingdoms
