= List of people of the Three Kingdoms (G) =

The following is a partial list of people significant to the Three Kingdoms period (220–280) of Chinese history. Their romanised names start with the letter G.

== G ==
| Name | Courtesy name | Birth year | Death year | Ancestral home (present-day location) | Role | Allegiance | Previous allegiance(s) | Notes |
|---|---|---|---|---|---|---|---|---|
| Gai Xun 蓋勳 | Yuangu 元固 | | | Guangzhi, Dunhuang (Guazhou County, Gansu) | Advisor, politician, general | Han dynasty | | |
| Lady Gan 甘夫人 | | | 209 | Pei (in Jiangsu) | Noble lady | Liu Bei | | Sanguozhi vol. 34. |
| Gan Gui 甘瑰 | | | | Linjiang, Ba (Zhong County, Chongqing) | | Eastern Wu | | |
| Gan Ji 干吉 | | | 200 | Langya (Jiaonan, Shandong) | Fangshi, Taoist | | | Yu Ji in novel. |
| Gan Li 甘醴 | | | | | General | Shi Hui | Eastern Wu | |
| Gan Ning 甘寧 | Xingba 興霸 | | | Linjiang, Ba (Zhong County, Chongqing) | General | Sun Quan | Liu Yan, Liu Zhang, Liu Biao | Sanguozhi vol. 55. |
| Gan Shi 甘始 | | | | Qingheguo, Ganling (Linqing, Shandong) | Fangshi | Cao Wei | | |
| Gao Ai 高艾 | | | | | Bandit leader | | | |
| Gao Cheng 高承 | | | | | General | Sun Ce | | |
| Gao Dai 高岱 | Kongwen 孔文 | | | Wu County, Wu (Suzhou, Jiangsu) | Politician | Han dynasty | | |
| Gao Dan 高誕 | | | | Yu, Chenliu (South of Qi County, Henan) | Politician | Jin dynasty | | |
| Gao Ding 高定 | | | 225 | Qiongdu (Southeast of Xichang, Sichuan) | Tribal leader | | | |
| Gao Fan 高蕃 | | | | | General | Yuan Shao | | |
| Gao Gan 高幹 | Yuancai 元才 | 168 | 206 | Yu, Chenliu (South of Qi County, Henan) | Politician, warlord | Gao Gan | Yuan Shao, Yuan Shang, Cao Cao | Houhanshu vol. 74; Sanguozhi vol. 6, 17, 18. |
| Gao Gong 高躬 | | | | Chenliu County, Yu (Qi County, Henan) | Politician | Han dynasty | | |
| Gao Guang 高光 | Xuanmao 宣茂 | | | Yu, Chenliu (South of Qi County, Henan) | Politician | Jin dynasty | | |
| Gao Gui 高軌 | | | | Nan County (Jingzhou, Hubei) | Politician | Jin dynasty | | |
| Gao Hong 高弘 | | | | Chenliu County, Yu (Qi County, Henan) | Politician | Han dynasty | | |
| Gao Hun 高渾 | | | | Yu, Chenliu (South of Qi County, Henan) | Politician | Cao Wei | | |
| Gao Jing 高靖 | | | | Yu, Chenliu (South of Qi County, Henan) | General | Han dynasty | | |
| Gao Jun 高儁 | | | | Yu, Chenliu (South of Qi County, Henan) | General | Cao Wei | | |
| Gao Lan 高覽 | | | | | General | Cao Cao | Yuan Shao | Sanguozhi vol. 6. |
| Gao Lü 高慮 | | | 239 | | General | Cao Wei | | |
| Gao Pei 高沛 | | | 213 | | General | Liu Zhang | | |
| Gao Qian 高遷 | | | | | General | Cao Wei | | |
| Gao Rou 高柔 | Wenhui 文惠 | 174 | 263 | Yu, Chenliu (South of Qi County, Henan) | Politician | Cao Wei | Yuan Shao, Gao Gan, Yuan Shang | Sanguozhi vol. 24. |
| Gao Shang 高尚 | | | | | General | Eastern Wu | | |
| Gao Sheng 高勝 | | | 218 | | Rebel leader | | | |
| Gao Shou 高壽 | | | | | General | Eastern Wu | | |
| Gao Shun 高順 | | | 198 | | General | Lü Bu | | Houhanshu vol. 75; Sanguozhi vol. 7. |
| Gao Tong 高通 | | | | | Politician | Eastern Wu | | |
| Gao Wan 高玩 | Bozhen 伯珍 | | | Shu County (Chengdu, Sichuan) | Politician | Jin dynasty | Shu Han | Huayang Guo Zhi vol. 11. 09. |
| Gao Wang 高望 | | | 189 | | Eunuch | Han dynasty | | |
| Gao Xiang 高翔 | | | | | General | Shu Han | | Huayang Guozhi annotation in Sanguozhi vol. 33. |
| Gao Xiang 高祥 | | | | | General | Shu Han | | |
| Gao Ya 高雅 | | | | | General | Lü Bu | | |
| Gao Yan 高焉 | | | | | Politician | Han dynasty | | |
| Gao Yuanlü 高元呂 | | | | | Fangshi, Diviner | | | |
| Gao Zuo 高祚 | | | | | General | Cao Wei | | |
| Gaotang Chen 高堂琛 | | | | Pingyang, Taishan (Xintai, Shandong) | Politician | Cao Wei | | |
| Gaotang Long 高堂隆 | Shengping 昇平 | | 237 | Pingyang, Taishan (Xintai, Shandong) | Politician | Cao Wei | | Sanguozhi vol. 25. |
| Ge Guang 葛光 | | | | | Scholar | Eastern Wu | | |
| Ge Heng 葛衡 | Sizhen 思真 | | | | Fangshi, Taoist | | | |
| Ge Xi 葛奚 | | | | | Politician | Eastern Wu | | |
| Ge Xuan 葛玄 | Xiaoxian 孝先 | 164 | 244 | Danyang County, Jurong (Jurong, Jiangsu) | Fangshi, Taoist | | | |
| Geng Bao 耿苞 | | | | | Politician | Yuan Shao | | |
| Geng Bi 耿鄙 | | | | | Politician | Han dynasty | | |
| Geng Ji 耿紀 | Jixing 季行 | | 218 | | General | Han dynasty | | |
| Geng Lin 耿臨 | | | | | General | Han dynasty | | |
| Geng Wu 耿武 | Wenwei 文威 | | 191 | | General, advisor | Han Fu | | Houhanshu vol. 74. |
| Geng Zhi 耿祉 | | | | | General | Han dynasty | | |
| Gong Chen 龔諶 | | | | Ba County, Anhan (Nanchong, Sichuan) | General | Shu Han | | |
| Gong Du 龔都 | | | | | General | Liu Bei | Yellow Turban rebels | Sanguozhi vol. 1, 32. Gong Dou in RTK 14. |
| Gong Heng 龔衡 | | | | Ba County, Anhan (Nanchong, Sichuan) | General | Shu Han | | |
| Gong Jiao 龔皦 | Deguang 德光 | | | Ba County, Anhan (Nanchong, Sichuan) | General | Shu Han | | |
| Gong Lu 龔禄 | Dexu 德緒 | 195 | 225 | Ba County, Anhan (Nanchong, Sichuan) | General, politician | Shu Han | | |
| Gong Zun 弓遵 | | | | | General, politician | Cao Wei | | |
| Gongchou Cheng 公仇稱 | | | | | Politician | Sun Jian | | |
| Gongsha Fu 公沙孚 | Yunci 允慈 | | | Jiaodong, Beihai (Pingdu, Shandong) | Politician | Han dynasty | | |
| Gongsha Lu 公沙盧 | | | | Jiaodong, Beihai (East of Jiaolai River, Shandong) | Militia leader | Han dynasty | | |
| Gongsun Du 公孫度 | Shengji 升濟 | 154 | 204 | Xiangping, Liaodong (Liaoyang, Liaoning) | General, politician, warlord | Gongsun Du | Han dynasty, Dong Zhuo | Sanguozhi vol. 8. |
| Gongsun Fan 公孫範 | | | | Lingzhi, Liaoxi (Qian'an, Hebei) | General | Gongsun Zan | | Houhanshu vol. 73; Sanguozhi vol. 8. |
| Gongsun Fang 公孫方 | | | | | | Han dynasty | | |
| Gongsun Gong 公孫恭 | | 174 | 238 | Xiangping, Liaodong (Liaoyang, Liaoning) | General, politician, warlord | Cao Wei | Gongsun Du, Gongsun Kang, Gongsun Gong | Sanguozhi vol. 8. |
| Gongsun Heng 公孫珩 | | | | | Politician | Gongsun Yuan | | |
| Gongsun Huang 公孫晃 | | 200 | 238 | Xiangping, Liaodong (Liaoyang, Liaoning) | | Gongsun Yuan | Gongsun Gong | |
| Gongsun Ji 公孫集 | | | | | General | Cao Wei | | |
| Gongsun Kang 公孫康 | | 172 | 210 | Xiangping, Liaodong (Liaoyang, Liaoning) | General, politician, warlord | Gongsun Kang | Gongsun Du | Sanguozhi vol. 8. |
| Gongsun Mo 公孫模 | | | | | General | Gongsun Kang | | |
| Gongsun Xiu 公孫脩 | | | 238 | Xiangping, Liaodong (Liaoyang, Liaoning) | | Gongsun Yuan | | |
| Gongsun Xu 公孫續 | | | 199 | Lingzhi, Liaoxi (Qian'an, Hebei) | General | Gongsun Zan | | Houhanshu vol. 79. |
| Gongsun Yang 公孫陽 | | | | | General | Eastern Wu | | |
| Gongsun Yuan 公孫淵 | Wenyi 文懿 | 205 | 238 | Xiangping, Liaodong (Liaoyang, Liaoning) | General, politician, warlord | Gongsun Yuan | Gongsun Gong, Cao Wei | Sanguozhi vol. 8; Jin Shu vol. 1. |
| Gongsun Yue 公孫越 | | | 191 | Lingzhi, Liaoxi (Qian'an, Hebei) | General | Gongsun Zan | | Houhanshu vol. 73; Sanguozhi vol. 8. |
| Gongsun Zan 公孫瓚 | Bogui 伯珪 | | 199 | Lingzhi, Liaoxi (Qian'an, Hebei) | General, warlord | Gongsun Zan | Han dynasty | Houhanshu vol. 73; Sanguozhi vol. 8. |
| Gongsun Zhao 公孫昭 | | | | | Politician | Han dynasty | | |
| Gongxu Gong 公緒恭 | | | | Shanyang County (Jining, Shandong) | | Han dynasty | | |
| Gou An 苟安 | | | | | General | Cao Wei | Shu Han | |
| Gu Cheng 顧承 | Zizhi 子直 | | | Wu County, Wu (Suzhou, Jiangsu) | General | Eastern Wu | | Sanguozhi vol. 52. |
| Gu Feng 顧奉 | Jihong 季鴻 | | | Wu County, Wu (Suzhou, Jiangsu) | Politician | Han dynasty | | Sanguozhi vol. 52. |
| Gu Hui 顧徽 | Zitan 子嘆 | | | Wu County, Wu (Suzhou, Jiangsu) | General, politician | Eastern Wu | | Sanguozhi vol. 52. |
| Gu Ji 顧濟 | | | | Wu County, Wu (Suzhou, Jiangsu) | General | Eastern Wu | | Sanguozhi vol. 52. |
| Gu Li 谷利 | | | | | General | Sun Quan | | Jiang Biao Zhuan annotation in Sanguozhi vol. 47. |
| Gu Li 顧禮 | | | | Wu County, Wu (Suzhou, Jiangsu) | | Eastern Wu | | Sanguozhi vol. 52. |
| Gu Pu 古朴 | | | | | General | Shu Han | | |
| Gu Qian 顧謙 | | | | Wu County, Wu (Suzhou, Jiangsu) | | Eastern Wu | | Sanguozhi vol. 52. |
| Gu Rong 顧榮 | Yanxian 彦先 | | 312 | Wu County, Wu (Suzhou, Jiangsu) | General, politician | Jin dynasty | Eastern Wu | Sanguozhi vol. 52. |
| Gu Rong 顧容 | | | | Wu County, Wu (Suzhou, Jiangsu) | General | Eastern Wu | | |
| Gu Shao 顧邵 | Xiaoze 孝則 | | | Wu County, Wu (Suzhou, Jiangsu) | Politician | Eastern Wu | | Sanguozhi vol. 52. |
| Gu Tan 顧譚 | Zimo 子默 | | | Wu County, Wu (Suzhou, Jiangsu) | Politician | Eastern Wu | | Sanguozhi vol. 52. |
| Gu Ti 顧悌 | Zitong 子通 | | | Wu County, Wu (Suzhou, Jiangsu) | General, politician | Eastern Wu | | Sanguozhi vol. 52. |
| Gu Xiang 顧向 | | | | Wu County, Wu (Suzhou, Jiangsu) | Politician | Eastern Wu | | Sanguozhi vol. 52. |
| Gu Yan 顧彦 | | | | Wu County, Wu (Suzhou, Jiangsu) | | Eastern Wu | | Sanguozhi vol. 52. |
| Gu Yong 顧雍 | Yuantan 元嘆 | 168 | 243 | Wu County, Wu (Suzhou, Jiangsu) | Politician | Eastern Wu | | Sanguozhi vol. 52. |
| Gu Yu 顧裕 | Jize 季則 | | | Wu County, Wu (Suzhou, Jiangsu) | General, politician | Eastern Wu | | Sanguozhi vol. 52. |
| Gu Yu 顧裕 | | | | Wu County, Wu (Suzhou, Jiangsu) | Politician | Eastern Wu | | Sanguozhi vol. 52. |
| Lady Guan 關氏 | | 204 | 271 | Xie, Hedong (Yuncheng, Shanxi) | Guan Yu's daughter | | | Sanguozhi vol. 36. |
| Guan Cheng 管承 | | 158 | 207 | Lai County, Changguang (Laiyang, Shandong) | Bandit, pirate | Yuan Tan | Yellow Turban rebels, Yuan Shao | |
| Guan Du 管篤 | | | | | General | Eastern Wu | | |
| Guan Fu 管馥 | | | | | | Jin dynasty | | |
| Guan Gong 管貢 | | | | | Politician | Cao Wei | | |
| Guan Gu 觀鵠 | | | 187 | Jingzhou, Lingling (Lingling District, Hunan) | Rebel leader | | | |
| Guan Hai 管亥 | | | | | General | Yellow Turban rebels | | Houhanshu vol. 70; Sanguozhi vol. 49. |
| Guan Jing 關靖 | Shiqi 士起 | | 199 | Taiyuan (Taiyuan, Shanxi) | Advisor, politician | Gongsun Zan | | Houhanshu vol. 73; Sanguozhi vol. 8. |
| Guan Jun 灌均 | | | | | Politician | Cao Wei | | |
| Guan Lu 管輅 | Gongming 公明 | 209 | 256 | Pingyuan (Pingyuan County, Shandong) | Diviner, fangshi | | | Sanguozhi vol. 29. |
| Guan Miao 管邈 | | | | Zhuxu, Beihai (Changle County, Shandong) | Politician | Cao Wei | | |
| Guan Ning 管寧 | You'an 幼安 | 158 | 241 | Zhuxu, Beihai (Changle County, Shandong) | Politician, scholar | Cao Wei | | Sanguozhi vol. 11. |
| Guan Ping 關平 | | | 219 | Xie, Hedong (Yuncheng, Shanxi) | General | Liu Bei | | Sanguozhi vol. 36. |
| Guan Tong 關統 | | | | Xie, Hedong (Yuncheng, Shanxi) | General | Shu Han | | Sanguozhi vol. 36. |
| Guan Tong 管統 | | | | | Politician | Yuan Tan | | |
| Guan Xing 關興 | Anguo 安國 | | | Xie, Hedong (Yuncheng, Shanxi) | Politician | Shu Han | | Sanguozhi vol. 36. |
| Guan Yan 管彦 | | | | Beihaiguo, Yingling (Weifang, Shandong) | General | Jin dynasty | | |
| Guan Yi 關彝 | | | | Xie, Hedong (Yuncheng, Shanxi) | | Shu Han | | Sanguozhi vol. 36. |
| Guan Yu 關羽 | Yunchang 雲長 | | 219 | Xie, Hedong (Yuncheng, Shanxi) | General | Liu Bei | Cao Cao | Sanguozhi vol. 36. |
| Guanqiu Chong 毌丘重 | | | | Wenxi, Hedong (Wenxi County, Shanxi) | | Eastern Wu | | |
| Guanqiu Dian 毌丘甸 | Zibang 子邦 | | 255 | Wenxi, Hedong (Wenxi County, Shanxi) | Politician | Cao Wei | | |
| Guanqiu Jian 毌丘儉 | Zhonggong 仲恭 | | 255 | Wenxi, Hedong (Wenxi County, Shanxi) | General | Cao Wei | | Sanguozhi vol. 28. Also known as Wuqiu Jian. |
| Guanqiu Xing 毌丘興 | | | | Wenxi, Hedong (Wenxi County, Shanxi) | | Cao Wei | | |
| Guanqiu Xiu 毌丘秀 | | | | Wenxi, Hedong (Wenxi County, Shanxi) | | Cao Wei | | |
| Guanqiu Xun 毌丘旬 | | | | Wenxi, Hedong (Wenxi County, Shanxi) | | Cao Wei | | |
| Guanqiu Yi 毌丘毅 | | | | | General | Han dynasty | | |
| Guanqiu Zhi 毌丘芝 | | | | Wenxi, Hedong (Wenxi County, Shanxi) | Guanqiu Dian's daughter | | | |
| Guanqiu Zong 毌丘宗 | Ziren 子仁 | | | Wenxi, Hedong (Wenxi County, Shanxi) | Politician | Jin dynasty | | |
| Gui Lan 桂嵐 | | 165 | 204 | Wu County, Wu (Suzhou, Jiangsu) | General | Sun Quan | | |
| Gui Tai 圭泰 | | | | Nanyang County (Nanyang, Henan) | Politician | Cao Wei | | |
| Gujin 骨進 | | | | | Tribal leader | Wuhuan | | |
| Empress Guo 郭皇后 | | | 263 | Xiping (Xining, Qinghai) | Empress | Cao Wei | | Sanguozhi vol. 5. See also Cao Wei family trees. |
| Guo Ban 郭頒 | | | | | Politician | Jin dynasty | | |
| Guo Biao 郭表 | | | | Julu County, Guangzong (Wei County, Hebei) | General, politician | Cao Wei | | |
| Guo Chang 郭敞 | | | | Yangzhai, Yingchuan (Yuzhou City, Henan) | Politician | Cao Wei | | |
| Guo Chen 郭諶 | | | | Dong County (Puyang, Henan) | Politician | Cao Wei | | |
| Guo Cheng 郭成 | | | | Julu County, Guangzong (Wei County, Hebei) | Politician | Cao Wei | | |
| Guo Chong 郭沖 | | | | Jincheng County (Yongjing County, Gansu) | Politician | Jin dynasty | | |
| Guo Chun 郭純 | | | | | Politician | Cao Wei | | |
| Guo Da 郭大/郭太 | | | | | Rebel leader | Yellow Turban rebels | | |
| Guo De 郭德 | Yansun 彥孫 | | | Xiping (Xining, Qinghai) | Advisor, politician | Jin dynasty | Cao Wei | |
| Guo Du 郭都 | | | | Julu County, Guangzong (Wei County, Hebei) | | Cao Wei | | |
| Guo Dan 郭誕 | Yuanyi 元奕 | | | Yangzhai, Yingchuan (Yuzhou City, Henan) | General | Cao Wei | | |
| Guo Dan 郭誕 | | | | | Politician | Eastern Wu | | |
| Guo Daxian 郭大賢 | | | | | Rebel leader | | | |
| Guo Duan 郭端 | | | | Dai County (Yanggao, Shanxi) | Politician | Han dynasty | | |
| Guo En 郭恩 | Yibo 義博 | | | Weilicao (Quzhou County, Hebei) | Scholar | Cao Wei | | |
| Guo Gong 郭貢 | | | | | Politician | Han dynasty | | |
| Guo Huai 郭淮 | Boji 伯濟 | 187 | 255 | Yangqu, Taiyuan (Taiyuan, Shanxi) | General | Cao Wei | | Sanguozhi vol. 26. |
| Guo Huai 郭槐 | Yuanshao 媛韶 | 237 | 296 | Yangqu, Taiyuan (Taiyuan, Shanxi) | Jia Chong's wife | Jin dynasty | Cao Wei | |
| Guo Huai 郭懷 | | | | | Jester | Cao Wei | | |
| Guo Jia 郭嘉 | Fengxiao 奉孝 | 170 | 207 | Yangzhai, Yingchuan (Yuzhou City, Henan) | Advisor, politician | Cao Cao | Yuan Shao | Sanguozhi vol. 14. |
| Guo Jian 郭建 | Shushi 叔始 | | | Xiping County (Xining, Qinghai) | General, politician | Jin dynasty | Cao Wei | |
| Guo Kai 郭凱 | | | | Fengyi (Dali County, Shaanxi) | Weiqi player | Han dynasty | | |
| Guo Li 郭立 | | | | Xiping County (Xining, Qinghai) | General | Cao Wei | | |
| Guo Lie 郭獵 | | | | Yangzhai, Yingchuan (Yuzhou City, Henan) | Politician | Cao Wei | | |
| Guo Ma 郭馬 | | | | | Rebel leader | Eastern Wu | | |
| Guo Man 郭滿 | | | | Xiping County (Xining, Qinghai) | Politician | Cao Wei | | |
| Guo Mou 郭謀 | | | | | Politician | Cao Wei | | |
| Guo Mu 郭睦 | | | | | Politician | Shu Han | | |
| Guo Nüwang 郭女王 | | 184 | 235 | Guangzong, Anping (Guangzong County, Hebei) | Empress | Cao Wei | | Sanguozhi vol. 5. See also Cao Wei family trees. |
| Guo Pei 郭配 | Zhongnan 仲南 | | | Yangqu, Taiyuan (Taiyuan, Shanxi) | Politician | Cao Wei | | |
| Guo Quan 郭全 | | | | Yangqu, Taiyuan (Taiyuan, Shanxi) | Politician | Han dynasty | | |
| Guo Shen 郭深 | | | | Yangzhai, Yingchuan (Yuzhou City, Henan) | Politician | Cao Wei | | |
| Guo Sheng 郭勝 | | | 189 | Nanyang (Nanyang, Henan) | Eunuch | Han dynasty | | |
| Guo Shi 郭石 | | | | | Rebel leader | | | |
| Guo Shu 郭述 | | | | Julu County, Guangzong (Wei County, Hebei) | Politician | Cao Wei | | |
| Guo Si / Guo Duo 郭汜/郭多 | | | 197 | Zhangye (Northwest of Zhangye, Gansu) | General, politician, warlord | Guo Si | Dong Zhuo | Houhanshu vol. 72; Sanguozhi vol. 6. |
| Guo Tai 國泰 | | | | Gai County, Le'an (Southeast of Yiyuan County, Shandong) | Politician | Cao Wei | | |
| Guo Tong 郭統 | | | | Yangqu, Taiyuan (Taiyuan, Shanxi) | Politician | Cao Wei | | |
| Guo Tu 郭圖 | Gongze 公則 | | 205 | Yingchuan (Yuzhou City, Henan) | Advisor, politician | Yuan Tan | Han Fu, Yuan Shao | Houhanshu vol. 74; Sanguozhi vol. 6. |
| Guo Xian 郭憲 | Youjian 幼簡 | | 220 | Xiping (Xining, Qinghai) | General | Cao Wei | Han Sui | |
| Guo Xiang 郭詳 | | | | Julu County, Guangzong (Wei County, Hebei) | General | Cao Wei | | |
| Guo Xin 郭昕 | | | | | Politician | Gongsun Yuan | | |
| Guo Xiu 郭脩/郭修 | Xiaoxian 孝先 | | 253 | Xiping (Xining, Qinghai) | General, politician | Cao Wei | Shu Han | |
| Guo Xuanxin 郭玄信 | | | | Yingchuan County, Yangzhai (Yuzhou, Henan) | Politician | Cao Wei | | |
| Guo Xun 郭訓 | | | | Julu County, Guangzong (Wei County, Hebei) | General | Cao Wei | | |
| Guo Xun 郭勳 | | | 184 | | General | Han dynasty | | |
| Guo Yi 郭奕 | Boyi 伯益 | | | Yangzhai, Yingchuan (Yuzhou City, Henan) | Politician | Cao Wei | | Sanguozhi vol. 14. |
| Guo Yi 郭奕 | Taiye 泰業 | | | Taiyuan County, Yangqu (Taiyuan, Shanxi) | Politician | Jin dynasty | | |
| Guo Yi 郭彝 | | | | | Politician | Cao Wei | | |
| Guo Yong 郭永 | | | | Guangzong, Anping (Guangzong County, Hebei) | Politician | Han dynasty | | |
| Guo Youzhi 郭攸之 | Yanchang 演長 | | | Nanyang (Nanyang, Henan) | Politician | Shu Han | | Sanguozhi vol. 35. |
| Guo Yu 郭豫 | Taining 泰寧 | | | Yangqu (Taiyuan, Shanxi) | General | Han dynasty | | |
| Guo Yuan 國淵 | Zini 子尼 | | | Gai County, Le'an (Southeast of Yiyuan County, Shandong) | Politician | Cao Wei | | Sanguozhi vol. 11. |
| Guo Yuan 郭援 | | 167 | 202 | | General, politician | Gao Gan | Yuan Shao, Yuan Shang | Sanguozhi vol. 18. |
| Guo Zhan 郭展 | Taishu 泰舒 | | | Yangqu (Taiyuan, Shanxi) | Politician | Cao Wei | | |
| Guo Zhao 郭釗 | | | | Julu County, Guangzong (Wei County, Hebei) | Politician | Cao Wei | | |
| Guo Zhen 郭鎮 | Jinan 季南 | | | Yangqu (Taiyuan, Shanxi) | Politician | Cao Wei | | |
| Guo Zheng 郭正 | | | | Fufeng, Mei (Mei County, Shaanxi) | | | | |
| Guo Zheng 郭正 | | | | Yangqu (Taiyuan, Shanxi) | Politician | Cao Wei | | |
| Guo Zheng 郭政 | | | | Dong County, Dunqiu (Xun County, Henan) | | | | |
| Guo Zhi 郭芝 | | | | Xiping (Xining, Qinghai) | Politician | Cao Wei | | |
| Guo Zhi 郭智 | Junmou 君謀 | | | | Politician | Cao Wei | | |
| Guo Ziyu 郭子瑜 | | | | | Politician | Han dynasty | | |
