= Guo Yuan =

Guo Yuan may refer to:

- Guo Yuan (Zini) (國淵, fl. 190s–210s), courtesy name Zini, official serving under the Han dynasty warlord Cao Cao
- Guo Yuan (Yuan Shang's subordinate) (郭援, died 202), official serving under the Han dynasty warlord Yuan Shang
- Guo Yuan (Zen monk) (born 1950), Vietnamese Buddhist monk
