= List of people of the Three Kingdoms (P) =

The following is a partial list of people significant to the Three Kingdoms period (220–280) of Chinese history. Their romanised names start with the letter P.

== P ==
Name	Courtesy name	Birth year	Death year	Ancestral home (present-day location)	Role	Allegiance	Previous allegiance(s)	Notes
Empress Pan 潘皇后			252	Juzhang, Kuaiji (Southeast of Yuyao, Zhejiang)	Empress	Eastern Wu		Sanguozhi vol. 50.
Pan Jun 潘濬	Chengming 承明		239	Hanshou, Wuling (Hanshou County, Hunan)	General, politician	Eastern Wu	Liu Biao, Shu Han	Sanguozhi vol. 61.
Pan Lin 潘臨					Tribal leader	Shanyue		
Pan Man 潘滿				Yinzhongmou (Mou County, Zhengzhou, Henan)	Politician	Cao Wei	Han dynasty	
Pan Mi 潘秘				Hanshou, Wuling (Hanshou County, Hunan)	Politician	Eastern Wu		
Pan Ping 潘平				Fagan, Dong (East of Guan County, Shandong)		Eastern Wu		
Pan Xu 潘勖	Yuanmao 元茂		215	Yinzhongmou (Mou County, Zhengzhou, Henan)	Politician	Han dynasty		
Pan Yin 潘隱					Politician	Han dynasty		
Pan Yue/Pan An 潘岳/潘安	Anren 安仁	247	300	Yinzhongmou (Mou County, Zhengzhou, Henan)	Scholar, politician	Jin dynasty		Jin Shu vol. 55.
Pan Zhang 潘璋	Wengui 文珪		234	Fagan, Dong (East of Guan County, Shandong)	General	Eastern Wu		Sanguozhi vol. 55.
Pan Zhu 潘翥	Wenlong 文龍			Hanshou, Wuling (Hanshou County, Hunan)	General	Eastern Wu		
Pang De 龐德	Lingming 令明		219	Huandao, Nan'an (East of Longxi County, Dingxi, Gansu)	General	Cao Cao	Ma Teng, Ma Chao, Zhang Lu	Sanguozhi vol. 18.
Pang Degong 龐德公	Shanmin 山民			Xiangyang (Xiangyang, Hubei)				
Pang Di 龐迪				Fufeng (Xingping, Shaanxi)	Politician	Cao Wei		
Pang E / Zhao E 龐娥/趙娥				Jiuquan County (Jiuquan, Gansu)	Noblewoman			Houhanshu vol. 84; Sanguozhi vol. 18.
Pang Gong 龐恭				Nan'an (Longxi, Gansu)	Politician	Han dynasty		
Pang Hong 龐宏	Jushi 巨師			Xiangyang (Xiangzhou District, Xiangyang, Hubei)	Politician	Shu Han		
Pang Huan 龐渙	Shiwen 世文			Xiangyang (Xiangyang, Hubei)	Politician	Jin dynasty		
Pang Hui 龐會				Huandao, Nan'an (East of Longxi County, Dingxi, Gansu)	General	Cao Wei		
Pang Ji 逢紀	Yuantu 元圖		202	Nanyang (Nanyang, Henan)	Advisor	Yuan Shao		
Pang Ji 龐季					Politician	Liu Biao		
Pang Le 龐樂					General	Liu Zhang		
Pang Lin 龐林				Xiangyang (Xiangzhou District, Xiangyang, Hubei)	General, politician	Cao Wei	Shu Han	
Pang Rou 龐柔				Nan'an, Huandao (Longxi, Gansu)	Politician	Shu Han	Ma Teng, Ma Chao	
Pang Shu 龐舒						Han dynasty		
Pang Tong 龐統	Shiyuan 士元	179	214	Xiangyang (Xiangzhou District, Xiangyang, Hubei)	Advisor, general, politician	Liu Bei		Sanguozhi vol. 37.
Pang Xi 龐羲				Henan (Luoyang, Henan)	General	Liu Bei	Liu Zhang	Pang Yi in RTK 2,3,7.
Pang Xi 龐熙					Advisor	Cao Wei		
Pang Yan 龐延				Fufeng (Xingping, Shaanxi)	Politician	Cao Wei		
Pang Yan 龐延					Politician	Shu Han		
Pang Yu 龐淯	Ziyi 子異			Biaoshi, Jiuquan (Jiuquan, Gansu)	Politician	Cao Wei		Sanguozhi vol. 18.
Pang Zeng 龐曾				Biaoshi, Jiuquan (Jiuquan, Gansu)	Politician	Cao Wei		
Pang Zixia 龐子夏				Biaoshi, Jiuquan (Jiuquan, Gansu)				
Pei Chuo 裴綽	Jishu 季舒			Wenxi (Wenxi County, Shanxi)	Politician	Jin dynasty		
Pei Hui 裴徽	Wenji 文季			Wenxi (Wenxi County, Shanxi)	Politician	Cao Wei		
Pei Jun 裴儁	Fengxian 奉先	179	250	Wenxi (Wenxi County, Shanxi)	Politician	Cao Wei		
Pei Kai 裴楷	Shuze 叔則	237	291	Wenxi (Wenxi County, Shanxi)	Advisor, politician	Jin dynasty		
Pei Kang 裴康	Zhongyu 仲豫				General	Jin dynasty		
Pei Li 裴黎	Bozong 伯宗			Wenxi (Wenxi County, Shanxi)	General	Jin dynasty		
Pei Mao 裴茂	Juguang 巨光			Wenxi, Hedong (Wenxi County, Shanxi)	General, politician	Han dynasty		
Pei Qian 裴潛	Wenxing 文行		244	Wenxi, Hedong (Wenxi County, Shanxi)	Politician	Cao Wei		Sanguozhi vol. 23.
Pei Qian 裴潛					Politician	Eastern Wu		
Pei Qin 裴欽				Xiapiguo (Suining County, Jiangsu)	Commentator	Eastern Wu		
Pei Sheng 裴生					General	Eastern Wu	Shu Han	
Pei Xiu 裴秀	Jiyan 季彥	224	271	Wenxi, Hedong (Wenxi County, Shanxi)	Cartographer, geographer, politician	Jin dynasty	Cao Wei	Jin Shu vol. 35.
Pei Xuan 裴玄	Yanhuang 彥黃			Xiapiguo (Suining County, Jiangsu)	Politician, writer, commentator	Eastern Wu		
Pei Yue 裴越	Lingxu 令緒			Wenxi (Wenxi County, Shanxi)	General, politician	Shu Han		
Peng Bo 彭伯					Politician	Han dynasty		
Peng Cai 彭材				Yuzhang County (Nanchang, Jiangxi)	Rebel leader			
Peng Dan 彭旦				Poyang, Yuzhang (Poyang County, Jiangxi)	Rebel leader			
Peng He 彭和			263		General	Shu Han		
Peng Hu 彭虎				Poyang, Yuzhang (Poyang County, Jiangxi)	Rebel leader			
Peng Qi 彭綺				Poyang, Yuzhang (Poyang County, Jiangxi)	Rebel leader			
Peng Qiu 彭璆				Beihaiguo (Changle County, Shandong)	Advisor	Kong Rong		
Peng Shi 彭式				Qiantang (Hangzhou, Zhejiang)	Rebel leader			
Peng Tuo 彭脫			184		General	Yellow Turban rebels		
Peng Yang 彭羕	Yongnian 永年	178	214	Guanghan (Xindu District, Sichuan)	Advisor, politician	Liu Bei	Liu Zhang	Sanguozhi vol. 40.
Ping-Han 平漢					Rebel leader	Black Mountain bandit		
Po Qin 繁欽	Xiubo 休伯		218	Yingchuan (Yuzhou, Henan)	Scholar, politician	Cao Cao	Han dynasty	
Putou 蒲頭					Tribal leader	Xianbei		
Pu Yuan 蒲元					Weapon-smith	Shu Han	Yuan Shu	
Pu Zhong 蒲忠					General	Cao Wei		
Pufulu 普富盧					Tribal leader	Wuhuan		
Puhu 朴胡					Tribal leader, politician	Cao Cao		
Puyang Kai 濮陽闓					Scholar	Han dynasty		
Puyang Xing 濮陽興	Ziyuan 子元		264	Chenliu (Kaifeng, Henan)	Politician	Eastern Wu		Sanguozhi vol. 64.
Puyang Yi 濮陽逸				Chenliu (Kaifeng, Henan)	Politician	Eastern Wu		
