= Doctors, Diviners, and Magicians of Ancient China =

Doctors, Diviners, and Magicians of Ancient China is a book written by Kenneth J. Dewoskin.

== Contents ==
Doctors, Diviners, and Magicians of Ancient China is a book in which the enigmatic figures known as fang-shih, who thrived between 200 B.C. and A.D. 500, are explored. These individuals were revered as diviners, sages, and opportunists, wielding esoteric knowledge that made them respected, feared, and sought after by rulers and their advisors. This book provides translated biographies from Chinese historical texts, illustrating how these figures interacted with both the populace and the elite. The fang-shih focused primarily on divination and weather control, rather than combat magic.

== Reception ==
William A. Barton reviewed Doctors, Diviners, and Magicians of Ancient China for Different Worlds magazine and stated that "DeWoskin, in his introductory chapter, points out several underlying elements in the stories and gives us an overview of Chinese beliefs about the supernatural. DeWoskin writes in an academic tone, but is rarely pedantic and jargon-laden. The price for this book is a bit steep - look for it in a good college library."
