= List of people of the Three Kingdoms (T) =

The following is a partial list of people significant to the Three Kingdoms period (220–280) of Chinese history. Their romanised names start with the letter T.

== T ==
| Name | Courtesy name | Birth year | Death year | Ancestral home (present-day location) | Role | Allegiance | Previous allegiance(s) | Notes |
|---|---|---|---|---|---|---|---|---|
| Tadun 蹋頓 | | | 207 | | Tribal leader | Wuhuan | | |
| Tudun 吐敦 | | | 276 | | Tribal leader | Northern Hu | | Jin Shu vol. 3. |
| Taishi Ci 太史慈 | Ziyi 子義 | 166 | 206 | Huang County, Donglai (Longkou, Shandong) | General | Sun Quan | Kong Rong, Liu Yao, Sun Ce | Sanguozhi vol. 49. |
| Taishi Xiang 太史享 | Yuanfu 元復 | | | Huang County, Donglai (Longkou, Shandong) | Politician | Eastern Wu | | Taishi Heng in novel. |
| Tan Fu 檀敷 | Wenyou 文友 | | | Shanyang (Jinxiang County, Shandong) | Politician | Han dynasty | | Houhanshu vol. 67. |
| Tan Mo 檀謨 | | | | | Politician | Han dynasty | | |
| Tan Shao 譚紹 | | | | Luling (Taihe, Jiangxi) | General | Eastern Wu | | |
| Tan Zheng 譚正 | | | | | General | Eastern Wu | | |
| Consort Tang 唐氏 | | | | Yingchuan County (Yuzhou, Henan) | Noble lady | Han dynasty | | |
| Tang Bin 唐彬 | Ruzong 儒宗 | 235 | 294 | Zou, Lu | General | Jin dynasty | | Jin Shu vol. 42. |
| Tang Gu 唐固 | Zizheng 子正 | | | Danyang (Xuancheng, Anhui) | Scholar, politician | Eastern Wu | | |
| Tang Pu 唐譜 | | | | | General | Eastern Wu | | |
| Tang Sheng 唐盛 | | | | | General | Eastern Wu | | |
| Tang Ti 唐蹏 | | | | | Tribal leader | Qiang | | |
| Tang Xidian 堂溪典 | Jidu 季度 | | | Yingchuan (Yuzhou, Henan) | Politician | Han dynasty | | |
| Tang Zhen 唐珍 | | | | Guiyang (Chenzhou, Hunan) | Politician | Han dynasty | | |
| Tang Zhou 唐周 | | | | Jinanguo (Zhangqiu, Shandong) | General | Han dynasty | Zhang Jue | |
| Tang Zi 唐咨 | | | | Licheng | General | Cao Wei | Eastern Wu | |
| Tao Dan 陶丹 | | | | Xiaoyang (Duchang, Jiangxi) | General | Eastern Wu | | |
| Tao Huang 陶璜 | Shiying 世英 | | | Danyang Moling, Yangzhou (Nanjing, Jiangsu) | General | Jin dynasty | Eastern Wu | Jin Shu vol. 57. |
| Tao Jun 陶浚/陶濬 | | | 280 | Danyang Moling, Yangzhou (Nanjing, Jiangsu) | General | Eastern Wu | | |
| Tao Qian 陶謙 | Gongzu 恭祖 | 132 | 194 | Danyang (Northeast of Dangtu County, Anhui) | Politician, warlord | Tao Qian | Han dynasty | Houhanshu vol. 73; Sanguozhi vol. 8. |
| Tao Shang 陶商 | | | | Danyang (Northeast of Dangtu County, Anhui) | | Tao Qian | | |
| Tao Sheng 陶升 | | | | | Rebel leader, general | Yuan Shao | Zhang Yan | |
| Tao Ying 陶應 | | | | Danyang (Northeast of Dangtu County, Anhui) | | Tao Qian | | |
| Taoqiu Hong 陶丘洪 | Zilin 子林 | | | Pingyuan (Pingyuan, Shandong) | | Han dynasty | | |
| Taoqiu Yi 陶丘一 | | | | | Politician | Cao Wei | | |
| Teng Dan 滕耽 | | | | Ju County, Beihai (Changle County, Shandong) | General | Sun Quan | Han dynasty | |
| Teng Fanglan 滕芳蘭 | | | | Ju County, Beihai (Changle County, Shandong) | Empress | Eastern Wu | | Sanguozhi vol. 50. |
| Teng Mu 滕牧 | | | | Ju County, Beihai (Changle County, Shandong) | Politician, general | Eastern Wu | | |
| Teng Xiu 滕修 | Xianxian 顯先 | | 288 | Xi'e, Nanyang (North of Nanyang, Henan) | Politician | Jin dynasty | Eastern Wu | Jin Shu vol. 57. |
| Teng Yin 滕胤 | Chengsi 承嗣 | | 256 | Ju County, Beihai (Changle County, Shandong) | Politician | Eastern Wu | | Sanguozhi vol. 64. |
| Teng Zhou 滕胄 | | | | Ju County, Beihai (Changle County, Shandong) | | Sun Quan | | |
| Ti Jun 梯俊 | | | | | General | Cao Wei | | |
| Lady Tian 田氏 | | | | | Empress Wang's mother | Cao Wei | | |
| Tian Chou 田疇 | Zitai 子泰 | 169 | 214 | Wuzhong, Right Beiping (Northwest of Yutian County, Hebei) | Advisor, politician | Cao Cao | Liu Yu | Sanguozhi vol. 11. |
| Tian Feng 田豐 | Yuanhao 元皓 | | 200 | Julu (Pingxiang County, Hebei) | Advisor | Yuan Shao | | |
| Tian Jing/Tian Yi 田景/田儀 | | | 192 | | Politician | Han dynasty | | |
| Tian Kai 田楷 | | | 199 | | General | Gongsun Zan | | |
| Tian Le 田樂 | | | | | General | Cao Wei | Han Sui | |
| Tian Lin 田林 | | | | Shanyang County (Jining, Shandong) | | Han dynasty | | |
| Tian Pengzu 田彭祖 | | | | | Politician | Cao Wei | | |
| Tian Shao 田韶 | | | | Liaodong County (Chaoyang County, Liaoning) | | Han dynasty | | |
| Tian Xu 田續 | | | | Wuzhong, Right Beiping (Northwest of Yutian County, Hebei) | General | Cao Wei | | |
| Tian Yan 田晏 | | | | | General | Han dynasty | | |
| Tian Yanhe 田彦和 | | | | | Calligrapher | Han dynasty | | |
| Tian Yin 田銀 | | | | | Rebel leader, general | | Cao Cao | |
| Tian Yu 田豫 | Guorang 國讓 | 171 | 252 | Yongnu County, Yuyang (Northeast of Wuqing District, Tianjin) | General, politician | Cao Wei | Liu Bei, Gongsun Zan | Sanguozhi vol. 26. |
| Tian Yu 田豫 | | | | Taiyuan (Taiyuan, Shanxi) | Politician | Cao Wei | | |
| Tian Zhang 田章 | | | | | General | Jin dynasty | Cao Wei | |
| Tong Zhi 僮芝 | | | | Danyang (Xuancheng, Anhui) | Politician, warlord | Han dynasty | | |
| Tufa Pigu 禿髮匹孤 | | | | | Tribal leader | Xianbei | | |
| Tufa Shoutian 禿髮壽闐 | | | | | Tribal leader | Xianbei | | |
| Tufa Shujineng 禿髮樹機能 | | | 280 | | Tribal leader | Xianbei | | |
| Tufa Wuwan 禿髮務丸 | | | | | Tribal leader | Xianbei | | |
| Tuoba Jiefen 拓跋詰汾 | | | 220 | | Tribal leader | Xianbei | | |
| Tuoba Kuai 拓跋儈 | | | 209 | | Tribal leader | Xianbei | | |
| Tuoba Lin 拓跋鄰 | | | 213 | | Tribal leader | Xianbei | | |
| Tuoba Liwei 拓跋力微 | | 174 | 277 | | Tribal leader | Xianbei | | |
