= List of people of the Three Kingdoms (J) =

The following is a partial list of people significant to the Three Kingdoms period (220–280) of Chinese history. Their romanised names start with the letter J.

== J ==
Name	Courtesy name	Birth year	Death year	Ancestral home (present-day location)	Role	Allegiance	Previous allegiance(s)	Notes
Ji Ben 吉本			218		Physician	Han dynasty		Sanguozhi vol. 1.
Ji Da 薊達	Zixun 子訓			Linzi (Zibo, Linzi District, Shandong)	Fangshi			
Ji Fu 紀孚				Danyang County, Moling (Nanjing, Jiangning District, Jiangsu)	Politician	Eastern Wu		
Ji Huang 吉黃				Fengyi, Chiyang (Jingyang County, Shaanxi)	Politician	Cao Wei		
Jihuo/Huoji/Jijihuo 濟火/火濟/濟濟火				Zangke, Jianning (Guizhou)	Tribal Leader	Heilulu, Shu Han		
Ji Kang 嵇康	Shuye 叔夜	224	263	Qiao county, Zhi (Su County, Anhui)	Scholar, musician	Cao Wei		Jin Shu vol. 49.
Jikeluo 吉軻羅					Tribal leader	Jin dynasty	Tufa Shujineng	Jin Shu vol. 38.
Ji Liang 紀亮				Danyang County, Moling (Nanjing, Jiangning District, Jiangsu)	Politician	Eastern Wu		
Ji Ling 紀靈					General	Yuan Shu		Houhanshu vol. 75; Sanguozhi vol. 7.
Ji Mao 吉茂	Shuchang 叔暢			Fengyi, Chiyang (Jingyang County, Shaanxi)	Politician	Cao Wei		
Ji Miao 吉邈	Wenran 文然		218			Han dynasty		Sanguozhi vol. 1.
Ji Mu 吉穆	Siran 思然		218			Han dynasty		Sanguozhi vol. 1.
Ji Xi 嵇喜	Gongmu 公穆			Qiao county, Zhi (Su County, Anhui)	Politician	Jin dynasty	Cao Wei	
Ji Xuanlong 紀玄龍				Pingyuan (Pingyuan County, Shandong)	Politician	Jin dynasty		
Ji Yan 暨艷	Zixiu 子休			Wu County (Suzhou, Jiangsu)	Politician	Eastern Wu		
Ji Yong 季雍				Qinghe (Qinghe County, Hebei)	General	Gongsun Zan	Yuan Shao	
Ji Zhao 嵇昭	Ziyuan 子遠			Qiao county, Zhi (Su County, Anhui)	Politician	Cao Wei		
Ji Zhi 紀陟	Zishang 子上			Danyang County, Moling (Nanjing, Jiangning District, Jiangsu)	Politician	Eastern Wu		
Jia Cai 賈彩				Guzang, Wuwei (Wuwei, Gansu)		Han dynasty		
Jia Chong 賈充	Gonglü 公閭	217	282	Xiangling County, Pingyang (Xiangfen County, Shanxi)	Advisor, politician, general	Jin dynasty	Cao Wei	Jin Shu vol. 40.
Jia Cong 賈琮	Mengjian 孟堅			Dong County, Liaocheng (Liaocheng, Shandong)	General, politician	Han dynasty		
Jia Fan 賈範			238		General	Gongsun Yuan		Jin Shu vol. 1.
Jia Fang 賈訪				Guzang, Wuwei (Wuwei, Gansu)	Politician	Cao Wei		
Jia Fu 賈輔					General	Cao Wei		
Jia Hong 賈洪	Shuye 叔業			Jingzhaoyin, Xinfeng (Xi'an, Shaanxi)	Advisor, politician	Cao Wei		
Jia Hun 賈混				Xiangling County, Hedong (Southeast of Linfen, Shanxi)	General, politician	Jin dynasty		
Jia Ji 賈玑				Guzang, Wuwei (Wuwei, Gansu)	General	Cao Wei		
Jia Kui 賈逵	Liangdao 梁道	174	228	Xiangling County, Hedong (Southeast of Linfen, Shanxi)	General, politician	Cao Wei		Sanguozhi vol. 15.
Jia Long 賈龍	Qiande 謙德		191	Shu county (Ya'an, Sichuan)	General	Liu Zhang	Liu Yan, Han dynasty	
Jia Mu 賈穆				Guzang, Wuwei (Wuwei, Gansu)	Politician	Cao Wei		
Jia Tong 賈通				Guzang, Wuwei (Wuwei, Gansu)	General	Jin dynasty		
Jia Xin 賈信					General	Cao Wei		
Jia Xu 賈詡	Wenhe 文和	147	223	Guzang, Wuwei (Wuwei, Gansu)	Advisor, politician	Cao Wei	Dong Zhuo, Li Jue, Zhang Xiu	Sanguozhi vol. 10.
Jia Xu/Jia Si 賈詡/賈栩/賈嗣					General	Cao Wei		
Jia Yan 賈延				Guzang, Wuwei (Wuwei, Gansu)		Jin dynasty		
Jia Yuan 賈原					General	Eastern Wu		
Jian Shuo 蹇碩			189		Eunuch	Han dynasty		Houhanshu vol. 69.
Jian Yong 簡雍	Xianhe 憲和			Zhuo (Zhuozhou, Hebei)	Advisor, politician	Liu Bei		Sanguozhi vol. 38.
Jiang Ban 蔣班					General	Jin dynasty	Cao Wei	
Jiang Bin 蔣斌				Xiangxiang, Lingling (Xiangxiang, Hunan)	General	Shu Han		
Jiang Gan 蔣幹	Ziyi 子翼			Jiujiang (in Shou County, Anhui)	Advisor	Cao Cao		Jiang Biao Zhuan annotation in Sanguozhi vol. 54.
Jiang Gong 江宮			200		Rebel leader			
Jiang He 姜合					Scholar, diviner	Han dynasty		
Jiang Ji 蔣濟	Zitong 子通	188	249	Ping'e, Chu (Huaiyuan County, Anhui)	Advisor, politician	Cao Wei		Sanguozhi vol. 14.
Jiang Jiong 姜冏				Ji County, Tianshui (Southeast of Gangu County, Gansu)	General	Cao Wei		
Jiang Kai 蔣凱				Ping'e, Chu (Huaiyuan County, Anhui)	Politician	Cao Wei		
Jiang Kang 蔣康					Politician	Eastern Wu		
Jiang Mi 蔣秘					General	Eastern Wu		
Jiang Qin 蔣欽	Gongyi 公奕		219	Shouchun, Jiujiang (Shou County, Anhui)	General	Sun Quan		Sanguozhi vol. 55.
Jiang Shi 蔣石					General	Cao Cao	Han Sui, Han dynasty	
Jiang Shu 蔣舒					General	Shu Han		
Jiang Wan 蔣琬	Gongyan 公琰		246	Xiangxiang, Lingling (Xiangxiang, Hunan)	General, politician, regent	Shu Han		Sanguozhi vol. 44.
Jiang Wei 姜維	Boyue 伯約	202	264	Ji County, Tianshui (Southeast of Gangu County, Gansu)	General	Shu Han	Cao Wei	Sanguozhi vol. 44.
Jiang Xian 蔣顯			264	Xiangxiang, Lingling (Xiangxiang, Hunan)	Politician	Cao Wei	Shu Han	
Jiang Xiu 蔣休				Shouchun, Jiujiang (Shou County, Anhui)	General	Eastern Wu		
Jiang Xiu 蔣秀				Ping'e, Chu (Huaiyuan County, Anhui)	Politician	Cao Wei		
Jiang Xiu 蔣脩			255		General	Eastern Wu		
Jiang Xu 姜敘	Boyi 伯奕			Ji County, Tianshui (Southeast of Gangu County, Gansu)	General	Han dynasty		
Jiang Xu 姜詡	Mengying 孟穎				Calligrapher			
Jiang Yan 蔣延					Politician	Eastern Wu		
Jiang Yi 蔣壹				Shouchun, Jiujiang (Shou County, Anhui)	General	Eastern Wu		
Jiang Yin 姜隱				Tianshui (Gangu County, Gansu)	General	Han dynasty		
Jiang Yiqu 蔣義渠					General	Yuan Shao		
Jiang Zuan 蔣纂				Peiguo (Pei County, Jiangsu)	Politician	Eastern Wu		
Jiao Bo 焦伯					Politician	Cao Wei		
Jiao Chu 焦觸					General	Cao Cao	Yuan Shao	
Jiao He 焦和			190		Politician	Han dynasty		
Jiao Huang 焦璜					Politician	Shu Han		
Jiao Jiao 焦矯				Kuaiji (Shaoxing, Zhejiang)		Han dynasty		
Jiao Sheng 焦勝					Politician	Jin dynasty		
Jiao Xian/Jiao Guang 焦先/焦光	Xiaoran 孝然			Hedong County (Xia County, Shanxi)	Hermit			
Jiao Yi 焦已					General	Han dynasty		
Jiao Yi 焦彜					General, advisor	Cao Wei		
Jiao Ziwen 焦子文					General	Cao Wei		
Jie Xiang 介象	Yuanze 元則			Kuaiji (Shaoxing, Zhejiang)	Fangshi, Taoist			
Jin Fu 靳富					Warlord	Jin Fu		
Jin Qi 金奇				Danyang County, She (She County, Anhui)	Rebel leader, general		Han dynasty	
Jin Shang 金尚	Yuanxiu 元休			Jingzhaoyin (Xi'an, Shaanxi)	Politician	Yuan Shu	Han dynasty	
Jin Wei 金瑋				Jingzhaoyin (Xi'an, Shaanxi)	Politician	Han dynasty		
Jin Xiang 靳詳				Taiyuan County (Taiyuan, Shanxi)	Politician	Shu Han		
Jin Xuan 金旋	Yuanji 元機		209	Jingzhao (in Shaanxi)	Politician, warlord	Liu Bei	Han dynasty	
Jin Yi 金禕	Deyi 德禕		218	Jingzhao (in Shaanxi)	Politician	Han dynasty		
Jin Yun 靳允					Politician	Han dynasty		
Jin Zong 晉宗					General	Cao Wei	Eastern Wu	
Jing Yang 景養					Diviner	Eastern Wu		
Jing Yi 景毅	Wenjian 文堅			Zitong, Guanghan, Yizhou(in Mianyang)	Politician	Han dynasty		
Jiong Mu 炅母					Rebel leader, general		Cao Cao	
Ju An 句安					General	Cao Wei	Shu Han	
Ju Fu 句扶	Xiaoxing 孝興			Hanchang, Baxi, Yizhou(Bazhong, Sichuan)	General	Shu Han		
Ju Hu 沮鵠				Guangping, Julu (East of Jize County, Hebei)	General	Yuan Shang	Yuan Shao	
Ju Jun 沮俊/沮儁		171	195		General	Han dynasty		
Ju Shou 沮授			200	Guangping, Julu (East of Jize County, Hebei)	Advisor	Yuan Shao		Sanguozhi vol. 6.
Ju Zong 沮宗				Guangping, Julu (East of Jize County, Hebei)		Yuan Shao		
Jue Ji 厥機					Tribal leader	Xianbei		
Juluohou 苴羅侯					General	Xianbei		
