= Guo Yuan (Zini) =

Early 3rd century official serving Cao Cao

- 國淵

Minister Coachman (太僕)
- In office ?–?

Administrator of Wei Commandery (魏郡太守)
- In office 212 or after – ?

Chief Clerk (長史) (under Cao Cao)
- In office 211 – ?
- Monarch: Emperor Xian of Han
- Chancellor: Cao Cao

Personal details
- Born: Unknown Shouguang, Shandong
- Died: Unknown
- Children: Guo Tai
- Occupation: Politician
- Courtesy name: Zini (子尼)

Guo Yuan (fl. 190s – 210s), courtesy name Zini, was a Chinese politician serving under the warlord Cao Cao in the late Eastern Han dynasty of China.

== Early life ==
Guo Yuan was from Gai County (蓋縣), Le'an Commandery (樂安郡), which is around present-day Shouguang, Shandong. In his younger days, he studied under the tutelage of the Confucian scholar Zheng Xuan. At the time, although Guo Yuan was a nobody, Zheng Xuan regarded him highly and once said, "Guo Zini is a beautiful talent. After observing him, I am sure that in the future he will become an important subject of the state."

When the Yellow Turban Rebellion broke out in 184, Guo Yuan, along with Bing Yuan, Guan Ning and others, fled north to Liaodong Commandery (遼東郡; around present-day Liaoyang, Liaoning) to evade the chaos. While living in the countryside of Liaodong, Guo Yuan earned a reputation as a well-read Confucian scholar and gained much prestige among the literati after he frequently gave public lectures.

== Service under Cao Cao ==
After returning to his native commandery sometime between 196 and 208, (Note: Cao Cao held the position of Minister of Works (司空) in the Han central government between 196 and 208. Guo Yuan's biography in the Sanguozhi specifically stated that he started his career under Cao Cao as an assistant official in the office of the Minister of Works, therefore it must have been sometime between 196 and 208.) Guo Yuan served as an assistant official under the warlord Cao Cao, who controlled the Han central government and the figurehead Emperor Xian. He was known for being very outspoken and direct, but honest and impartial, whenever he spoke up during debates in the imperial court.

When Cao Cao implemented the tuntian system of agriculture, he put Guo Yuan in charge of supervising the implementation of the policy. Guo Yuan performed his role well and achieved commendable results. He assessed the costs and benefits, conducted a population census and divided the land into smaller units accordingly, appointed officials to oversee the various units, and established a clear set of rules and regulations governing the entire system. Within five years, the granaries were fully stocked with food supplies and the people got along with their livelihoods.

In 211, when Cao Cao personally led his forces on a campaign in the Guanzhong region, he appointed Guo Yuan as his Chief Clerk (長史) and ordered him to remain behind to oversee the daily activities of the Imperial Chancellor's office.

In the following year, Guo Yuan assisted the general Cao Ren in suppressing a rebellion by Tian Yin (田銀) and Su Bo (蘇伯) in Hejian Commandery (河間郡; around present-day Cangzhou, Hebei). After the revolt was crushed, many rebels were rounded up and sentenced to death. Guo Yuan advised Cao Cao to grant clemency to those rebels because they were not the masterminds. Cao Cao approved. Over 1,000 rebels were spared due to Guo Yuan's effort. At the time, it was not uncommon for officials to exaggerate their achievements in the reports they submitted after winning battles or suppressing rebellions. Guo Yuan, however, gave the exact figures in his report. When a surprised Cao Cao asked him why, Guo Yuan said that it was not something he was proud of because the rebellion was a sign of government failure. Cao Cao was so pleased when he heard what Guo Yuan said that he promoted him to be the Administrator (太守) of Wei Commandery (魏郡; around present-day Handan, Hebei).

During Guo Yuan's tenure in Wei Commandery, there was an incident where an anonymous person wrote libelous pamphlets and circulated them. Cao Cao, who hated defamatory behaviour, ordered Guo Yuan to investigate and find out who the culprit was. Guo Yuan kept the pamphlets and ordered his subordinates to keep it secret. After examining the pamphlets, he realised that they contained lines from the two "Metropolis Rhapsodies". He instructed one of his subordinates: "Wei Commandery is a big commandery. Even though it is a capital city, there are few scholars living here. These pamphlets can serve as something for the young to study. I want you to find three persons to study under the scholars." After his subordinate found him three young men, Guo Yuan told them, "You still have much to learn. The two "Metropolis Rhapsodies" are important works of literature, yet they are often neglected and very few scholars understand them. You should find a scholar who understands the two "Metropolis Rhapsodies" and ask him to teach you." He then secretly gave them other instructions. The three men found a scholar who was well-versed in the two "Metropolis Rhapsodies", got him to write an article, and passed it to Guo Yuan. Guo Yuan compared the scholar's handwriting with the handwriting in the pamphlets and saw that they were similar. He then arrested and questioned the scholar, who admitted that he was the culprit and confessed everything.

Guo Yuan was later promoted to the position of Minister Coachman (太僕) in the imperial court. Although he was a high-ranking minister, he led a simple and frugal lifestyle, and was known for being polite and humble towards everyone. He never accumulated any personal wealth and instead used it to help his relatives, friends and acquaintances in need. He died in office most probably before the end of the Eastern Han dynasty in 220.

== Family ==
Guo Yuan had a son, Guo Tai (國泰). After Guo Yuan's death, Cao Cao recruited Guo Tai to serve as a government official.

== See also ==
- Lists of people of the Three Kingdoms
