= List of people of the Three Kingdoms (F) =

The following is a partial list of people significant to the Three Kingdoms period (220–280) of Chinese history. Their romanised names start with the letter F.

== F ==
Name	Courtesy name	Birth year	Death year	Ancestral home (present-day location)	Role	Allegiance	Previous allegiance(s)	Notes
Fa Miao 法邈				Mei County, Fufeng (Mei County, Shaanxi)	Politician	Shu Han		Sanguozhi vol. 37.
Fa Yan 法衍	Jimou 季謀			Mei County, Fufeng (Mei County, Shaanxi)	Politician	Han dynasty		Sanfu Jue Lu Zhu annotation in Sanguozhi vol. 37.
Fa Zhen 法真	Gaoqing 高卿	100	188	Mei County, Fufeng (Mei County, Shaanxi)	Hermit			Houhanshu vol. 83.
Fa Zheng 法正	Xiaozhi 孝直	176	220	Mei County, Fufeng (Mei County, Shaanxi)	Advisor, general, politician	Liu Bei	Liu Zhang	Sanguozhi vol. 37.
Lady Fan 樊氏					Noble lady	Zhao Fan	Han dynasty	
Fan A 樊阿					Physician			
Fan Can 范粲	Chengming 承明	205	285	Waihuang (Minquan County, Henan	Officer	Cao Wei		Jinshu vol. 94.
Fan Changsheng 范長生	Yuanshou 元壽	219	318	Danxin (Fuling District, Chongqing	Taoist			
Fan Chou 樊稠			195	Jincheng (around Lanzhou, Gansu and Xining, Qinghai)	General	Dong Zhuo		Houhanshu vol. 72; Sanguozhi vol. 6.
Fan Fang 范方					General	Gongsun Zan		
Fan Jian 樊建	Changyuan 長元			Yiyang (Tongbai County, Henan)	Politician	Shu Han		Sanguozhi vol. 35.
Fan Jun 范頵				Liang, Henanyin (Ruzhou, Henan)	Politician	Jin dynasty		
Fan Ling 樊陵	Deyun 德雲		189	Nanyang County (Nanyang, Henan)	Politician	Han dynasty		
Fan Ling 范陵					General	Cao Wei		
Fan Miao 番苗				Jiuzhen County (Thanh Hoa, Vietnam)		Han dynasty		
Fan Min 樊敏	Shengda 升達	119	203	Qingyi (Lushan County, Sichuan)	Politician	Han dynasty		
Fan Neng 樊能					General	Liu Yao		Sanguozhi vol. 46, 49.
Fan Pu 樊普						Han dynasty		
Fan Qi 樊岐					General	Shu Han		
Fan Qiang 范彊					General	Sun Quan	Shu Han	Fan Jiang in novel.
Fan Ran/ Fan Dan 范冉/ 范丹	Shiyun 史雲	112	185	Waihuang (Minquan County, Henan	Scholar	Han dynasty		Houhanshu vol. 81.
Fan Shen 范慎	Xiaojing 孝敬		274	Guangling (Jiangdu District, Jiangsu)	General	Eastern Wu		
Fan Xian 范先				Hedong (Xia County, Shanxi)	General	Cao Wei		
Fan Xin 番歆				Jiuzhen County (Thanh Hoa, Vietnam)	General	Han dynasty		
Fan Xin 范馨			222	Waihuang (Minquan County, Henan	Officer	Cao Wei	Han dynasty	Jinshu vol. 94.
Fan Xiong 范熊			284		Tribal leader	Eastern Wu	Champa	
Fan Yao 范耀				Guangling (Jiangdu District, Jiangsu)		Eastern Wu		
Fan Yi 氾嶷					General	Lü Bu		
Fan You 樊友					Politician	Shu Han		
Fan Zeng 范曾	Zimin 子閔				General	Han dynasty		
Fan Zhan 范旃					Tribal leader	Funan		
Fan Zhen 樊震					General	Jin dynasty	Cao Wei	
Fan Zheng 樊正				Kuaiji, Shangyu (Shangyu, Zhejiang)		Han dynasty		
Fan Zhou 樊伷				Nanyang (Nanyang, Henan)	General	Eastern Wu		
Fan Zizhao 樊子昭				Runan County (Pingyu County, Henan)	Politician	Han dynasty		
Fang Ji 紡績					Maid	Eastern Wu		
Fatong 伐同					General	Qiang		
Fei Boren 費伯仁				Meng County, Jiangxia (Luoshan County, Henan)		Liu Zhang		
Fei Cheng 費承				Meng County, Jiangxia (Luoshan County, Henan)	Politician	Shu Han		
Fei Gong 費恭				Meng County, Jiangxia (Luoshan County, Henan)	Politician	Shu Han		
Fei Guan 費觀	Binbo 賓伯			Meng County, Jiangxia (Xinyang, Henan)	General	Shu Han	Liu Zhang	
Fei Ji 費緝	Wenping 文平			Wuyang, Qianwei (Pengshan County, Sichuan)	Politician	Jin dynasty	Shu Han	Huayang Guo Zhi vol. 11. 13.
Fei Li 費立	Jianxi 建熙		311	Nan'an, Qianwei (Leshan, Sichuan)	Politician	Jin dynasty	Shu Han, Cao Wei	Huayang Guo Zhi vol. 11. 17.
Fei Qi 費齊				Kuaiji (Shaoxing, Zhejiang)	Scholar			
Fei Shi 費詩	Gongju 公舉			Nan'an, Qianwei (Leshan, Sichuan)	Politician	Shu Han	Liu Zhang	Sanguozhi vol. 41.
Fei Yang 費楊					Politician	Eastern Wu		
Fei Yao 費曜					General	Cao Wei		
Fei Yao 費瑤					General	Cao Wei		
Fei Yi 費禕	Wenwei 文偉		253	Meng County, Jiangxia (Xiaochang County, Hubei)	General, politician	Shu Han		Sanguozhi vol. 44.
Fei Zhan 費棧				Danyang County (Xuancheng, Anhui)	Bandit leader, general	Cao Cao	Shanyue	
Lady Feng 馮氏					Yuan Shu's wife	Yuan Shu		
Feng Chao 馮朝					General	Eastern Wu		
Feng Chun 馮純						Eastern Wu		
Feng Dan 馮紞	Shaozhou 少胄		286	Jizhou, Anpingguo (Jizhou, Hebei)	Advisor, politician, general	Jin dynasty	Cao Wei	
Feng Fang 馮方					Politician	Han dynasty		
Feng Fang 馮芳					General	Han dynasty		
Feng Fei 馮斐			270		General	Eastern Wu		
Feng Fu 封俌					Politician	Eastern Wu		
Feng Heng 封衡	Junda 君達			Longxi (Wushan County, Gansu)	Fangshi, Taoist			
Feng Kai 馮楷					General	Cao Cao		
Feng Li 馮禮			204		General	Yuan Shao		
Feng Liang 馮諒				Dong County (Puyang, Henan)	Politician	Han dynasty		
Feng Ren 封仁					Politician	Cao Wei		
Feng Shang 封賞					Warlord			
Feng Shuo 馮碩			196		Politician	Han dynasty		
Feng Su 馮肅					Musician	Han dynasty		
Feng Xi 馮習	Xiuyuan 休元		222	Gong'an, Nan (Gong'an County, Hubei)	General	Shu Han		Sanguozhi vol. 45.
Feng Xi 馮熙	Zirou 子柔			Yingchuan (Yuzhou, Henan)	Politician	Eastern Wu		
Feng Xu 封諝					Eunuch	Han dynasty		
Feng Ze 馮則					General	Sun Quan		
Fu Chang 傅常					Politician	Eastern Wu		
Fu Chong 傅充				Niyang, Beidi (Southeast of Yaozhou District, Shaanxi)	Politician	Han dynasty		
Fu De 伏德					General	Han dynasty		
Fu Gan 傅幹	Yancai 彦材	175		Niyang, Beidi (Southeast of Yaozhou District, Shaanxi)	Politician	Cao Cao	Ma Teng	
Fu Gongming 傅公明				Runan (Pingyu County, Henan)		Han dynasty		
Fu Jia 傅嘏	Lanshi 蘭石	209	255	Niyang, Beidi (Southeast of Yaozhou District, Shaanxi)	Politician	Cao Wei		Sanguozhi vol. 21.
Fu Jin 扶禁					General	Liu Zhang		
Fu Kuang 輔匡	Yuanbi 元弼			Xiangyang (Xiangyang, Hubei)	General	Shu Han		
Fu Mu 傅募				Yiyang (Zaoyang, Hubei)	Politician	Shu Han		
Fu Qian 傅僉			263	Yiyang (Xinyang, Henan)	General	Shu Han		Sanguozhi vol. 45.
Fu Qian 服虔	Zishen 子慎			Xingyang (Xingyang, Henan)	Politician	Han dynasty		
Fu Qun 傅群					Politician	Cao Cao		
Fu Rong 傅肜			222	Yiyang (Xinyang, Henan)	General	Shu Han		Sanguozhi vol. 45. Fu Tong in novel.
Fu Rong 傅容					Politician	Cao Wei		
Fu Rui 傅睿				Niyang, Beidi (Tongchuan, Shaanxi)	Politician	Han dynasty		
Fu Shou 伏壽			214	Dongwu, Langya (Zhucheng, Shandong)	Empress	Han dynasty		Houhanshu vol. 9, 10.
Fu Wan 伏完			209	Dongwu, Langya (Zhucheng, Shandong)	Politician	Han dynasty		Houhanshu vol. 9, 10.
Fu Xian 傅咸	Changyu 長虞	239	294	Niyang, Beidi (Southeast of Yaozhou District, Shaanxi)	Politician	Jin dynasty		
Fu Xie 傅燮	Nanrong 南容		188	Lingzhou (Wuzhong, Ningxia)	General	Han dynasty		
Fu Xuan 傅玄	Xiuyi 休奕	217	278	Niyang, Beidi (Southeast of Yaozhou District, Shaanxi)	General	Jin dynasty		Jin Shu vol. 47.
Fu Xun 傅巽	Gongti 公悌			Niyang, Beidi (around Yaozhou District, Shaanxi)	Politician	Cao Wei	Liu Biao	Sanguozhi vol. 6.
Fu Ying 傅嬰					General	Eastern Wu		
Fu Yun 浮雲					Rebel leader	Yellow Turban rebels		
Fu Yun 傅允				Niyang, Beidi (Southeast of Yaozhou District, Shaanxi)		Cao Wei		
Fu Zhi 傅祗	Zizhuang 子莊	243	311	Niyang, Beidi (Southeast of Yaozhou District, Shaanxi)	General, politician	Jin dynasty		
Fu Zhu 傅著				Yiyang (Zaoyang, Hubei)	Politician	Shu Han		
Fujian 苻健				Wudu County (Cheng County, Gansu)	Tribal leader	Shu Han	Di	
Fuluohan 扶羅韓					Tribal leader	Xianbei		
