= List of people of the Three Kingdoms (D) =

The following is a partial list of people significant to the Three Kingdoms period (220–280) of Chinese history. Their romanised names start with the letter D.

== D ==
Name	Courtesy name	Birth year	Death year	Ancestral home (present-day location)	Role	Allegiance	Previous allegiance(s)	Notes
Dahong 大洪					Rebel leader	Yellow Turban rebels		
Dai Chang 戴昌				Guangling (Yangzhou, Jiangsu)	Politician	Western Jin	Eastern Wu	Jin Shu vol. 89, 90.
Dai Jie 戴捷						Cao Wei		
Dai Liang 戴良						Eastern Wu		
Dai Lie 戴烈				Guangling (Yangzhou, Jiangsu)	General	Eastern Wu		
Dai Ling 戴陵					General	Cao Wei		
Dai Qian 戴乾				Danyang (Dangtu County, Anhui)	Politician	Cao Wei		
Dai Yong 戴顒				Danyang (Dangtu County, Anhui)	Politician	Jin dynasty	Eastern Wu	
Dai Yuan 戴源		166	204		General	Sun Quan		
Daigu 帶固				Xuantu County (Tonghua, Jilin)	Politician	Goguryeo		
Dan Meng 儋萌					Politician	Han dynasty		
Dang Xun 宕蕈					Tribal leader	Qiang		
Delai 得來				Xuantu County (Tonghua, Jilin)	Advisor	Goguryeo		
Deng Ai 鄧艾	Shizai 士載		264	Jiyang, Yiyang (Xinye County, Henan)	General	Cao Wei		Sanguozhi vol. 28.
Deng Dang 鄧當					General	Sun Ce		
Deng Dun 鄧敦					Politician	Cao Wei		
Deng Fang 鄧方	Kongshan 孔山		222	Nan Commandery (Jingzhou, Hubei)	General	Shu Han		
Deng Fu 鄧輔				Hanzhong County, Fangling (Shiyan, Hubei)	Politician	Shu Han		
Deng Ji 鄧濟					General	Liu Biao		
Deng Jing 鄧靜					Musician, general	Cao Wei		
Deng Ju 鄧句			264		General	Eastern Wu		
Deng Kai 鄧凱				Nan County, Zigui (Zigui County, Hubei)	General	Shu Han		
Deng Liang 鄧良				Nanyang County, Xinye (Xinye County, Henan)	Politician	Jin dynasty	Shu Han, Cao Wei	
Deng Long 鄧龍					General	Liu Biao		
Deng Sheng 鄧生					General	Eastern Wu		
Deng Sheng 鄧升					General	Yuan Shao		
Deng Sheng 鄧盛	Boneng 伯能			Hongnong Commandery (East of Henan)	Politician	Han dynasty		
Deng Tong 鄧銅					General	Shu Han		
Deng Xian 鄧賢					General	Cao Wei	Liu Zhang, Liu Bei	
Deng Xuanzhi 鄧玄之				Nanyang County (Nanyang, Henan)	Politician	Sun Quan		
Deng Yang 鄧颺	Xuanmao 玄茂		249		General, politician	Cao Wei		Sanguozhi vol. 4, 9.
Deng Yi 鄧義/鄧羲				Zhangling (Zaoyang, Hubei)	Advisor	Cao Cao	Liu Biao	
Deng You 鄧由					General	Eastern Wu		
Deng Zhan 鄧展					General	Cao Wei		
Deng Zhi 鄧芝	Bomiao 伯苗		251	Xinye, Yiyang (Xinye County, Henan)	General, politician	Shu Han		Sanguozhi vol. 45.
Deng Zhong 鄧忠			264	Jiyang, Yiyang (Xinye County, Henan)	General	Cao Wei		Sanguozhi vol. 28.
Deng Zixiao 鄧子孝					Hermit	Han dynasty		
Dian Man 典滿				Jiwu, Chenliu (Ningling County, Henan)	General	Cao Wei		Sanguozhi vol. 18.
Dian Wei 典韋			197	Jiwu, Chenliu (Ningling County, Henan)	General	Cao Cao		Sanguozhi vol. 18.
Diao Jia 刁嘉					Politician	Eastern Wu		
Diao Xuan 刁玄				Danyang (Northeast of Dangtu County, Anhui)	General	Eastern Wu		
Ding Chong 丁沖				Pei (Suixi County, Anhui)	General	Cao Cao		
Ding Fan 丁蕃					General	Eastern Wu		
Ding Fei 丁斐	Wenhou 文侯			Qiao County, Pei (Bozhou, Anhui)	General	Cao Wei	Han dynasty	
Ding Feng 丁奉	Chengyuan 承淵		271	Anfeng, Lujiang (Lujiang County, Anhui)	General	Eastern Wu		Sanguozhi vol. 55.
Ding Feng 丁封				Anfeng, Lujiang (Lujiang County, Anhui)	General	Eastern Wu		Sanguozhi vol. 55.
Ding Fu 丁孚					Politician, writer	Eastern Wu		
Ding Gong 丁宮	Yuanxiong 元雄			Peiguo (Suixi, Anhui)	Politician	Han dynasty		
Ding Gong 丁厷						Shu Han		
Ding Gu 丁固	Zijian 子賤			Shanyin, Kuaiji (Southeast of Shaoxing, Zhejiang)	Politician	Eastern Wu		
Ding Jungan 丁君幹						Shu Han		
Ding Lan 丁覽	Xiaolian 孝連			Shanyin, Kuaiji (Shaoxing, Zhejiang)	Politician	Sun Quan		
Ding Li 丁立					General	Shu Han		
Ding Mi 丁謐	Yanjing 彦靖		249	Qiao County, Pei (Bozhou, Anhui)	Advisor, politician	Cao Wei		
Ding Mi 丁彌	Qinyuan 欽遠			Shanyin, Kuaiji (Shaoxing, Zhejiang)	Politician	Jin dynasty		
Ding Xian 丁咸					General	Shu Han		
Ding Xu 丁諝				Qiantang, Kuaiji (Hangzhou, Zhejiang)	General	Eastern Wu		
Ding Yan 丁晏						Eastern Wu		
Ding Yi 丁儀	Zhengli 正禮		220	Pei (Suixi County, Anhui)	Politician, scholar	Cao Wei		Sanguozhi vol. 19.
Ding Yi 丁廙	Jingli 敬禮		220	Pei (Suixi County, Anhui)	Politician	Cao Wei		Ding Yin in novel.
Ding Yuan 丁原	Jianyang 建陽		189		General, politician, warlord	Ding Yuan	Han dynasty	Sanguozhi vol. 7.
Ding Zhong 丁忠					General	Eastern Wu		
Ding Zun 丁尊					Politician	Cao Wei		
Diwu Xun 第五巡	Wenxiu 文休			Jingzhaoyin (Xi'an, Shaanxi)				
Consort Dong 董貴人			200		Noble lady	Han dynasty		
Empress Dowager Dong 董太后			189	Hejian (Xian County, Hebei)	Empress dowager	Han dynasty		Houhanshu vol. 10.
Dong Ba 董巴					General, advisor	Cao Wei		
Dong Bai 董白			192	Lintao, Longxi (Min County, Gansu)	Dong Zhuo's granddaughter	Dong Zhuo		
Dong Bi 董弼			233	Yanmen, Loufan (Ningwu County, Shanxi)	General	Cao Wei		
Dong Cen 董岑					General	Eastern Wu		
Dong Chao 董朝					Politician	Eastern Wu		
Dong Chao 董超			219		General	Cao Cao		
Dong Cheng 董承			200		General, politician	Han dynasty		Sanguozhi vol. 32.
Dong Chong 董重			189		General	Han dynasty		
Dong Fang 董訪				Dingtao, Jiyin (Dingtao County, Shandong)	Politician	Cao Wei	Zhang Miao	
Dong Fen 董芬				Hongnong (Lingbao City, Henan)		Cao Wei		
Dong Feng 董奉	Junyi 君異	220	280	Houguan (Fuzhou, Fujian)	Physician			
Dong Feng 冬逢					Politician	Shu Han		
Dong Fu 董扶	Mao'an 茂安			Mianzhu, Guanghan (Mianzhu, Sichuan)	Politician	Liu Yan		
Dong He 董和	Youzai 幼宰			Zhijiang, Nan (Zhijiang, Hubei)	Advisor, politician	Shu Han	Liu Zhang	Sanguozhi vol. 39.
Dong He 董和					General	Han dynasty		
Dong He 董和					Politician	Cao Wei		
Dong Heng 董衡			219		General	Cao Cao		
Dong Hong 董宏				Zhijiang, Nan (Zhijiang, Hubei)	Politician	Jin dynasty		
Dong Huang 董璜			192	Lintao, Longxi (Min County, Gansu)	General	Dong Zhuo		
Dong Hui 董恢	Xiuxu 休緒			Xiangyang (Xiangyang, Hubei)	Politician	Shu Han		
Dong Ji 董箕					Politician	Cao Wei		
Dong Jing 董經					Politician	Cao Wei		
Dong Jizhong 董季中				Hongnong (Lingbao City, Henan)		Han dynasty		
Dong Jue 董厥	Gongxi 龔襲			Yiyang (Xinyang, Henan)	General, politician	Jin dynasty	Shu Han, Cao Wei	Sanguozhi vol. 35.
Dong Meng 董蒙					Politician	Cao Wei	Han dynasty	
Dong Min 董旻	Shuying 叔穎		192	Lintao, Longxi (Min County, Gansu)	General	Dong Zhuo		
Dong Rong 董榮	Zongzhong 宗仲			Guanghan (Guanghan, Sichuan)	Politician	Jin dynasty	Shu Han	Huayang Guo Zhi vol. 11. 05.
Dong Si 董祀				Chenliu (Chenliu, Henan)	Cai Yan(Wenji)'s husband			
Dong Si 董嗣					Rebel leader			
Dong Sui 董綏				Hongnong (Lingbao City, Henan)	Politician	Jin dynasty		
Dong Tao 董桃					Politician	Eastern Wu		
Dong Xi 董襲	Yuandai 元代		215	Yuyao, Kuaiji (Yuyao, Zhejiang)	General	Sun Quan		Sanguozhi vol. 55.
Dong Xun 董尋				Xie, Hedong (Yuncheng, Shanxi)	Politician	Cao Wei		
Dong Yu 董遇	Jizhi 季直			Hongnong (Lingbao City, Henan)	General, politician	Cao Wei	Han dynasty	
Dong Yuan 董元			271	Jianning (Qujing, Yunnan)	General	Jin dynasty	Shu Han, Cao Wei	
Dong Yue 董越			192		General	Dong Zhuo		
Dong Yun 董允	Xiuzhao 休昭		246	Zhijiang, Nan (Zhijiang, Hubei)	Politician	Shu Han	Liu Zhang	Sanguozhi vol. 39.
Dong Zhao 董昭	Gongren 公仁	156	236	Dingtao, Jiyin (Dingtao County, Shandong)	Advisor, politician	Cao Wei	Yuan Shao, Zhang Yang	Sanguozhi vol. 14.
Dong Zhonglian 董仲連					Politician	Jin dynasty		
Dong Zhou 董胄				Dingtao, Jiyin (Dingtao County, Shandong)	Politician	Cao Wei		
Dong Zhuo 董卓	Zhongying 仲穎		192	Lintao, Longxi (Min County, Gansu)	General, politician, warlord	Dong Zhuo	Han dynasty	Houhanshu vol. 72; Sanguozhi vol. 6.
Dongli Gun 東裏衮					General	Cao Wei		
Dou Fu 竇輔		167	211		General	Cao Cao	Liu Biao	
Dou Li 竇禮					General	Cao Wei		
Dou Mao 竇茂					Tribal leader	Di		
Dou Yun 竇允				Shiping (Shaoxing, Zhejiang)	Politician	Jin dynasty		
Lady Du, Lady of Xiyang 杜氏/郃陽君					Empress dowager	Cao Wei		
Du Bin 杜斌	Shijiang 世將		300	Duling, Jingzhao (Xi'an, Shaanxi)	Politician	Jin dynasty		
Du Chang 杜長					General	Cao Cao	Han dynasty	
Du De 杜德					Politician	Eastern Wu		
Du Hui 杜會				Dingling County, Yingchuan (Ye County, Henan)	Politician	Cao Wei		
Du Ji 杜畿	Bohou 伯侯	163	224	Duling, Jingzhao (Xi'an, Shaanxi)	General, politician	Cao Wei		Sanguozhi vol. 16.
Du Ji 杜基				Dingling County, Yingchuan (Ye County, Henan)	Politician	Cao Wei		
Du Kuan 杜寬	Wushu 務叔			Duling, Jingzhao (Xi'an, Shaanxi)	Politician	Cao Wei		
Du Kui 杜夔	Gongliang 公良			Henan (Luoyang, Henan)	Musician	Cao Wei	Liu Biao	Sanguozhi vol. 29.
Du Li 杜理	Wuzhong 務仲			Duling, Jingzhao (Xi'an, Shaanxi)		Cao Wei		
Du Liang 杜良	Youlun 幼倫			Chengdu, Shu (Chengdu, Sichuan)	Politician	Jin dynasty	Shu Han	Huayang Guo Zhi vol. 11. 10.
Du Lie 杜烈	Zhongwu 仲武			Chengdu, Shu (Chengdu, Sichuan)	Politician	Jin dynasty	Shu Han	Huayang Guo Zhi vol. 11. 10.
Du Lu 杜路					General	Eastern Wu	Shu Han	
Du Mo 杜默	Shixuan 世玄			Dong County (Puyang, Henan)	Politician	Jin dynasty		
Du Pu 杜普					General	Shu Han		
Du Qi 杜祺				Nanyang County (Nanyang, Henan)	General, politician	Shu Han		
Du Qiong 杜瓊	Boyu 伯瑜	167	250	Chengdu, Shu (Chengdu, Sichuan)	Astronomer, politician	Shu Han	Liu Zhang	Sanguozhi vol. 42.
Du Shu 杜恕	Wubo 務伯	198	252	Duling, Jingzhao (Xi'an, Shaanxi)	General, politician	Cao Wei		
Du Song 杜松					General	Cao Cao		
Du Tong 杜通					General	Cao Wei		
Du Wei 杜微	Guofu 國輔			Fu, Zitong (East of Mianyang, Sichuan)	Advisor, politician	Shu Han	Liu Zhang	Sanguozhi vol. 42.
Du Xi 杜襲	Zixu 子緒			Dingling County, Yingchuan (Ye County, Henan)	General, politician	Cao Wei		Sanguozhi vol. 23.
Du Xiong 杜雄	Boxiong 伯雄			Chengdu, Shu (Chengdu, Sichuan)	Politician	Shu Han		
Du Yang 杜陽					Politician	Han dynasty		
Du Yi 杜義					General	Shu Han		
Du You 杜友	Jizi 季子			Dong County (Puyang, Henan)	Politician	Jin dynasty	Cao Wei	
Du You 杜祐					Politician	Han dynasty		
Du Yu 杜預	Yuankai 元凱	222	285	Duling, Jingzhao (Xi'an, Shaanxi)	General, politician, scholar	Jin dynasty	Cao Wei	Jin Shu vol. 34.
Du Zhen 杜禎	Wenran 文然			Chengdu, Shu (Chengdu, Sichuan)	Politician	Jin dynasty	Shu Han	Huayang Guo Zhi vol. 11. 03.
Du Zhen 杜軫	Chaozong 超宗			Chengdu, Shu (Chengdu, Sichuan)	Politician	Jin dynasty	Shu Han	Huayang Guo Zhi vol. 11. 10.
Du Zhi 杜摯	Delu 德魯			Hedong County, Wenxi (Wenxi County, Shanxi)	Advisor, politician	Cao Wei		
Duan Gui 段珪			189		Eunuch	Han dynasty		
Duan Mo 段默				Jingzhao (Xi'an, Shaanxi)	Politician	Cao Wei		
Duan Qiaoxiao 段巧笑					Palace maid	Cao Wei		
Duan Wei 段煨	Zhongming 忠明	148	209	Wuwei (Wuwei, Gansu)	General	Cao Cao	Dong Zhuo, Li Jue, Yang Feng	
Duan Xun 段訓					Politician	Han dynasty		
Duan Zhao 段昭					General	Cao Wei		
Duan Zhuo 段灼	Xiuran 休然			Dunhuang (Dunhuang, Gansu)	General	Jin dynasty		
Duan Zongzhong 段宗仲				Guanghan (Guanghan, Sichuan)	Politician	Jin dynasty	Shu Han	
Duhuo 杜濩					Tribal leader, politician	Cao Cao, Bandun Man		
