= List of people of the Three Kingdoms (N) =

The following is a partial list of people significant to the Three Kingdoms period (220–280) of Chinese history. Their romanised names start with the letter N.

== N ==
Name	Courtesy name	Birth year	Death year	Ancestral home (present-day location)	Role	Allegiance	Previous allegiance(s)	Notes
Nai Taiyuan 乃太原				Pingyuan (Pingyuan County, Shandong)				
Nalou 那樓				Shang County (Yulin, Shaanxi)	Tribal leader	Wuhuan		
Nanlou 難樓				Shanggu (Huailai County, Hebei)	Tribal leader	Wuhuan		
Nengchendi 能臣氐				Dai County (Yanggao County, Shanxi)	Tribal leader	Wuhuan		
Ni Yi 倪顗				Luguo County (Qufu, Shandong)	Politician	Cao Wei		
Nie Kui 聶夔					Politician	Cao Wei		
Nie You 聶友	Wenti 文悌			Yuzhang County (Nanchang, Jiangxi)	General	Eastern Wu		
Niu Dan 牛亶					General	Han dynasty		
Niu Fu 牛輔			192		General	Dong Zhuo		
Niu Gai 牛蓋					General	Cao Cao		
Niu Jin 牛金				Nanyang (Nanyang, Henan)	General	Cao Wei		
