= Guan Ning =

Cao Wei politician and writer (158–241)

- 管寧

Personal details
- Born: 158 Linqu County, Shandong
- Died: 241 (aged 83)
- Relations: Guan Zhong (ancestor)
- Children: Guan Miao
- Occupation: Writer
- Courtesy name: You'an (幼安)

Guan Ning (158–241), courtesy name You'an, was a Chinese writer of the state of Cao Wei during the Three Kingdoms period of China. He was from Zhuxu County (朱虛縣), Beihai Commandery, which is near present-day Linqu County, Shandong. His father died when he was 16. He was friends with Hua Xin and Bing Yuan (邴原).

== See also ==
- Lists of people of the Three Kingdoms
