= List of people of the Three Kingdoms (O) =

The following is a partial list of people significant to the Three Kingdoms period (220–280) of Chinese history. Their romanised names start with the letter O.

== O ==
Name	Courtesy name	Birth year	Death year	Ancestral home (present-day location)	Role	Allegiance	Previous allegiance(s)	Notes
Ou Jing 區景					General	Han dynasty		Sanguozhi vol. 49.
Ou Xing 區星					Rebel leader			
