= List of people of the Three Kingdoms (R) =

The following is a partial list of people significant to the Three Kingdoms period (220–280) of Chinese history. Their romanised names start with the letter R.

== R ==
Name	Courtesy name	Birth year	Death year	Ancestral home (present-day location)	Role	Allegiance	Previous allegiance(s)	Notes
Rao Zhu 饒助				Yong'an, Hedong (Huozhou, Shanxi)	Politician	Eastern Wu		
Raolong Zong 擾龍宗					Politician	Han dynasty		
Rejiong 熱冏					Tribal leader	Jin dynasty	Tufa Shujineng	Jin Shu vol. 38.
Ren An 任安	Dingzu 定祖	124	202	Mianzhu (Deyang, Sichuan)	Scholar, politician	Liu Zhang	Liu Yan	Houhanshu vol. 79. (part.1)
Ren Du 任度					General	Eastern Wu		
Ren Fan 任藩					Politician	Han dynasty		
Ren Fu 任福					General	Cao Wei		
Ren Guang 任光					Politician	Han dynasty		Houhanshu vol. 21.
Ren Jia 任嘏	Zhaoxian 昭先			Le'anguo, Bochang (Boxing County, Binzhou, Shandong)	Politician	Cao Wei		
Ren Jun 任峻	Boda 伯達		204	Zhongmu County (Zhongmu County, Henan)	Politician	Cao Cao		Sanguozhi vol. 16.
Ren Kai 任愷	Yuanbao 元褒	223	284	Le'an County, Bochang (Boxing County, Shandong)	Politician	Jin dynasty	Cao Wei	Jin Shu vol. 45.
Ren Kui 任夔			218		General	Liu Bei		
Ren Lan 任覽				Zhongmu County (Zhongmu County, Henan)	Politician	Cao Wei		
Ren Qi 任岐				Shu county (Chengdu, Sichuan)	General	Han dynasty		
Ren Xi 任熙	Boyuan 伯遠			Chengdu, Shu (Chengdu, Sichuan)	Politician	Jin dynasty	Shu Han	Huayang Guo Zhi vol. 11. 11.
Ren Xian 任先				Zhongmu County (Zhongmu County, Henan)	Politician	Cao Wei		
Ren Yang 任養					General	Han dynasty		
Ren Yi 任奕				Juzhang, Kuaiji (Cicheng, Zhejiang)	Politician	Cao Wei		
Ren Yuan 任元	Xiuming 秀明			Chengdu, Shu (Chengdu, Sichuan)	Politician	Shu Han		Huayang Guo Zhi vol. 11. 11.
Ren Zhao 任旐	Fangyu 方與			Le'anguo, Bochang (Boxing County, Binzhou, Shandong)	Politician	Han dynasty		
Rong Shao 榮邵					Politician	Han dynasty		
Ru Chao 汝超					Politician	Shu Han		
Lady Ruan 阮氏				Chenliu (Kaifeng, Henan)	Xu Yun's wife	Cao Wei		
Ruan Bing 阮炳	Shuwen 書文			Chenliu (Kaifeng, Henan)	Physician, politician	Cao Wei		
Ruan Chen 阮諶	Shixin 士信			Chenliu (Kaifeng, Henan)	Writer	Cao Wei		
Ruan Ji 阮籍	Sizong 嗣宗	210	263	Weishi, Chenliu (in Kaifeng, Henan)	General	Cao Wei		Jin Shu vol. 49.
Ruan Wu 阮武	Wenye 文業			Chenliu (Kaifeng, Henan)	Politician	Cao Wei		
Ruan Xi 阮熙				Weishi, Chenliu (in Kaifeng, Henan)	Politician	Cao Wei		
Ruan Xian 阮咸	Zhongrong 仲容			Weishi, Chenliu (in Kaifeng, Henan)	General, musician	Jin dynasty	Cao Wei	
Ruan Yu 阮瑀	Yuanyu 元瑜		212	Weishi, Chenliu (in Henan)	Scholar			
Lady Rui 芮氏				Danyang (Xuancheng, Anhui)	Noble lady	Eastern Wu		
Rui Liang 芮良	Wenluan 文鸞			Danyang (Xuancheng, Anhui)	General	Sun Ce		
Rui Xuan 芮玄	Wenbiao 文表		226	Danyang (Xuancheng, Anhui)	General	Sun Quan		
Rui Zhi 芮祉	Xuansi 宣嗣			Danyang (Xuancheng, Anhui)	General	Sun Jian		
Ruoluobaneng 若羅拔能			305		Tribal leader	Tufa Shujineng		
