= List of people of the Three Kingdoms (M) =

The following is a partial list of people significant to the Three Kingdoms period (220–280) of Chinese history. Their romanised names start with the letter M.

== M ==
Name	Courtesy name	Birth year	Death year	Ancestral home (present-day location)	Role	Allegiance	Previous allegiance(s)	Notes
Ma Ai 馬艾					Politician	Cao Wei		
Ma Bing 馬秉				Yicheng, Xiangyang (Yicheng, Hubei)	General	Shu Han		
Ma Chao 馬超	Mengqi 孟起	176	222	Maoling, Fufeng (Northeast of Xingping, Shaanxi)	General	Shu Han	Ma Teng, Ma Chao, Zhang Lu	Sanguozhi vol. 36.
Ma Cheng 馬承				Maoling, Fufeng (Northeast of Xingping, Shaanxi)	Politician	Shu Han	Ma Teng, Ma Chao, Zhang Lu	Sanguozhi vol. 36.
Ma Dai 馬岱				Maoling, Fufeng (Northeast of Xingping, Shaanxi)	General	Shu Han	Ma Teng, Ma Chao, Zhang Lu	Sanguozhi vol. 36.
Ma He 馬和					General	Cao Wei		
Ma Hui 馬恢				Langzhong, Baxi (Langzhong, Sichuan)		Shu Han		
Ma Jun 馬鈞	Deheng 德衡			Fufeng (Xingping, Shaanxi)	Mechanical engineer, politician	Cao Wei		Sanguozhi vol. 29.
Ma Liang 馬良	Jichang 季常	187	222	Yicheng, Xiangyang (Yicheng, Hubei)	Advisor, general, politician	Shu Han		Sanguozhi vol. 39.
Ma Long 馬隆	Xiaoxing 孝興			Dongping (Dongping County, Shandong)	General	Jin dynasty	Cao Wei	Jin Shu vol. 57.
Ma Mao 馬茂			245		Rebel leader, general		Eastern Wu, Cao Wei	
Ma Miao 馬邈				Hailing, Guangling, Yang Province (Rugao, Jiangsu)	Politician	Cao Wei	Shu Han	Sanguozhi vol. 28.
Ma Midi 馬日磾	Wengshu 翁叔	140	194	Fufeng (Xingping, Shaanxi)	Politician	Yuan Shu	Han dynasty, Dong Zhuo, Li Jue	Ma Ridi in RTK 13,14.
Ma Ping 馬平					Scholar	Jin dynasty		
Ma Ping 馬平				Maoling, Fufeng (Northeast of Xingping, Shaanxi)	Politician	Han dynasty		
Ma Pu 馬普				Jiyang, Chenliu (Lankao County, Henan)	Scholar	Eastern Wu		
Ma Qi 馬齊	Chengbo 承伯			Langzhong, Baxi (Langzhong, Sichuan)	Politician	Shu Han		
Ma Qin 馬秦					Rebel leader			
Ma Qiu 馬秋			215	Maoling, Fufeng (Northeast of Xingping, Shaanxi)		Zhang Lu	Ma Teng, Ma Chao	Sanguozhi vol. 36.
Ma Shi 馬適					Politician	Cao Wei		
Ma Su 馬謖	Youchang 幼常	190	228	Yicheng, Xiangyang (Yicheng, Hubei)	Advisor, general, politician	Shu Han		Sanguozhi vol. 39.
Ma Tai 馬台				Zhuo (Zhuozhou, Hebei)		Cao Wei		
Ma Teng 馬騰	Shoucheng 壽成		211	Maoling, Fufeng (Northeast of Xingping, Shaanxi)	General, warlord	Cao Cao	Han dynasty, Ma Teng	
Ma Tie 馬鐵			211	Maoling, Fufeng (Northeast of Xingping, Shaanxi)		Ma Teng		
Ma Wan 馬玩					General	Guanzhong coalition		
Ma Xiang 馬香/相			188		Rebel leader	Zhang Jue		
Ma Xiu 馬休			211	Maoling, Fufeng (Northeast of Xingping, Shaanxi)		Ma Teng		
Ma Xiu 馬脩				Langzhong, Baxi (Langzhong, Sichuan)	General	Shu Han		
Ma Xun 馬勳	Shengheng 盛衡			Langzhong, Baxi (Langzhong, Sichuan)	General	Shu Han	Liu Zhang	
Ma Xun 馬訓					Politician, diviner	Cao Wei		
Ma Yan 馬延					General	Cao Cao	Yuan Shao	
Ma Yi 馬義				Langzhong, Baxi (Langzhong, Sichuan)	Politician	Jin dynasty		
Ma Yong 馬顒					Politician	Cao Wei		
Ma Yu 馬宇			192		Politician	Han dynasty		
Ma Yu 馬玉					General	Shu Han		
Ma Yuanyi 馬元義			184		General	Yellow Turban rebels		Zizhi Tongjian vol. 58.
Ma Zhao 馬照					Scholar	Cao Wei		
Ma Zhong 馬忠	Dexin 德信		249	Langzhong, Baxi (Langzhong, Sichuan)	General	Shu Han		Sanguozhi vol. 43.
Ma Zhong 馬忠					General	Sun Quan		Sanguozhi vol. 47, 55.
Ma Zun 馬遵					General	Cao Wei		
Man Changwu 滿長武				Changyi, Shanyang (Juye County, Shandong)	General	Cao Wei		
Man Chong 滿寵	Boning 伯寧		242	Changyi, Shanyang (Juye County, Shandong)	General	Cao Wei		Sanguozhi vol. 26.
Man Fen 滿奮	Wuqiu 武秋			Changyi, Shanyang (Juye County, Shandong)	Politician	Jin dynasty		
Man Wei 滿偉	Gongheng 公衡			Changyi, Shanyang (Juye County, Shandong)	Politician	Cao Wei		
Empress Mao 毛皇后			237	Henei (Jiaozuo, Henan)	Empress	Cao Wei		Sanguozhi vol. 5.
Mao Gan 毛甘					Rebel leader			
Mao Hong 毛弘	Daya 大雅			Wuyang (Xiping County, Henan)	Calligrapher, politician	Han dynasty		
Mao Hui 毛暉					General	Cao Wei	Lü Bu	
Mao Ji 毛機				Pingqiu, Chenliu (Fengqiu County, Henan)	Politician	Cao Wei		
Mao Jia 毛嘉			235	Henei (Jiaozuo, Henan)	General, politician	Cao Wei		
Mao Jie 毛玠	Xiaoxian 孝先		216	Pingqiu, Chenliu (Fengqiu County, Henan)	Advisor, politician	Cao Cao		Sanguozhi vol. 12.
Mao Jiong 毛炅			272	Jianning, Yizhou (Zhuzhou, Hunan)	General	Jin dynasty		
Mao Yuan 毛掾					General	Cao Wei		
Mao Zeng 毛曾				Henei (Jiaozuo, Henan)	Politician	Cao Wei		
Mao Zong 毛宗					Politician	Cao Wei		
Mayu 麻余				Fuyuguo (North of Yan Mountains, Inner Mongolia)	Tribal leader	Buyeo		
Mei Cheng 梅成			209	Lujiang (Southwest of Lujiang County, Anhui)	General, rebel leader	Yuan Shu	Zhang Jue	
Mei Fu 梅敷					General	Sun Quan	Cao Wei	
Mei Gan 梅乾/梅干				Lujiang (Southwest of Lujiang County, Anhui)	General, rebel leader	Yuan Shu		
Meiguneng 沒骨能					Tribal leader	Jin dynasty	Tufa Shujineng	Jin Shu vol. 57.
Mei Ping 梅平				Guangling (Yangzhou, Jiangsu)	General	Han dynasty		
Mei Yi 梅頤					General, warlord	Eastern Wu	Mei Yi	
Meng Da 孟達	Zijing / Zidu 子敬 / 子度		228	Fufeng (Southeast of Xingping, Shaanxi)	General	Cao Wei	Liu Zhang, Liu Bei	Sanguozhi vol. 3, 40, 41; Jin Shu vol. 1.
Meng Da 孟達					Politician	Cao Wei		
Meng Dai 孟岱					General	Yuan Shao		
Meng Gan 孟幹					General	Jin dynasty	Shu Han, Cao Wei	
Meng Guan 孟觀					General	Cao Wei		
Meng Guang 孟光	Xiaoyu 孝裕			Luoyang (Luoyang, Henan)	Advisor, politician	Shu Han	Han dynasty, Liu Yan, Liu Zhang	
Meng Huo 孟獲				Jianning (East of Jinning County, Yunnan)	Local leader	Shu Han	Nanman	
Meng Jian 孟建	Gongwei 公威			Runan (Runan County, Henan)	General, politician	Cao Wei		
Meng Kang 孟康	Gongxiu 公休			Anpingguo (Hengshui, Hebei)	General	Cao Wei		
Meng Qiu 孟虬				Jianning (East of Jinning County, Yunnan)	Local leader	Shu Han	Nanman	
Meng Si 孟思					General	Cao Wei		
Meng Ta 孟他				Fufeng (Xingping, Shaanxi)	Politician	Han dynasty		
Meng Wu 孟武						Cao Wei		
Meng Xing 孟興				Fufeng (Xingping, Shaanxi)	General	Cao Wei		
Meng Yan 孟琰				Zhuti (Zhaotong, Yunnan)	General	Shu Han		
Meng Yao 孟曜					Musician	Liu Biao		
Meng Ying 孟英				Shangyu, Kuaiji (Shangyu, Zhejiang)	Politician	Han dynasty		
Meng Zong 孟宗/孟仁	Gongwu 恭武		271	Jiangxia County (Ezhou, Hubei)	Politician	Eastern Wu		
Lady Mi 糜夫人				Qu, Donghai (Lianyungang, Jiangsu)	Noble lady	Liu Bei		
Mi Fang 麋芳	Zifang 子方			Qu, Donghai (Lianyungang, Jiangsu)	General, politician	Sun Quan	Tao Qian, Shu Han	Sanguozhi vol. 32, 36, 38, 45, 57.
Mi Heng 禰衡	Zhengping 正平	173	198	Yin County, Pingyuan (Linyi, Shandong)	Scholar	Liu Biao		Houhanshu vol. 80.
Mi Wei 麋威				Qu, Donghai (Lianyungang, Jiangsu)	General	Shu Han		
Mi Zhao 麋照				Qu, Donghai (Lianyungang, Jiangsu)	General	Shu Han		
Mi Zhu 麋竺	Zizhong 子仲		221	Qu, Donghai (Lianyungang, Jiangsu)	Advisor, politician	Shu Han	Tao Qian	Sanguozhi vol. 38.
Miao Bo 繆播	Xuanze 宣則		309	Donghai County, Lanling (Linyi, Cangshan County, Shandong)	Politician	Jin dynasty		
Miao Fei 繆斐	Wenya 文雅			Donghai County, Lanling (Linyi, Cangshan County, Shandong)	Politician	Han dynasty		
Miao Shang 繆尚					Politician	Cao Wei	Zhang Yang	
Miao Shao 繆紹				Donghai County, Lanling (Linyi, Cangshan County, Shandong)		Jin dynasty		
Miao Xi 繆襲	Xibo 熙伯	186	245	Donghai County, Lanling (Linyi, Cangshan County, Shandong)	Politician	Cao Wei		
Miao Yi 繆禕				Peiguo (Pei County, Jiangsu)	Politician	Eastern Wu		
Miao Yin 繆胤	Xiuzu 休祖		309	Donghai County, Lanling (Linyi, Cangshan County, Shandong)	General, politician	Jin dynasty		
Miao Yue 繆悦	Kongyi 孔懌			Donghai County, Lanling (Linyi, Cangshan County, Shandong)	Politician	Jin dynasty		
Miao Zhi 繆徵				Donghai County, Lanling (Linyi, Cangshan County, Shandong)	Politician	Jin dynasty		
Midang 迷當					Tribal leader	Qiang		Sanguozhi vol. 26.
Mijia 彌加					Tribal leader	Xianbei		
Min Chun 閔純	Bodian 伯典		191		Politician	Han Fu		Guan Chun in the novel.
Min Gong 閔貢	Zhongshu 仲叔				Politician	Han dynasty		
Mohuba 莫護跋				Jicheng (Yi County, Liaoning)	Tribal leader	Xianbei		
Mu Bing 沐並	Dexin 德信			Hejianguo (Xian County, Hebei)	Politician	Cao Wei	Yuan Shao	
Mu Yi 沐儀				Hejianguo (Xian County, Hebei)		Cao Wei		
Mu Yun 沐雲				Hejianguo (Xian County, Hebei)		Cao Wei		
Murong Muyan 慕容木延				Jicheng (Yi County, Liaoning)	Tribal leader	Xianbei		
