= List of people of the Three Kingdoms (E) =

The following is a partial list of people significant to the Three Kingdoms period (220–280) of Chinese history. Their romanised names start with the letter E.

== E ==
Name	Courtesy name	Birth year	Death year	Ancestral home (present-day location)	Role	Allegiance	Previous allegiance(s)	Notes
Ehe 俄何					General	Qiang		
Erchan 兒禪					Tribal leader	Dingling		
Erxiaode 兒孝德					Politician	Han dynasty		
Erxun 兒尋						Cao Wei		
Ezhesai 蛾遮塞					General	Qiang		
