= List of people of the Three Kingdoms (A) =

The following is a partial list of people significant to the Three Kingdoms period (220–280) of Chinese history. Their romanised names start with the letter A.

== A ==
Name	Courtesy name	Birth year	Death year	Ancestral home (present-day location)	Role	Allegiance	Previous allegiance(s)	Notes
Agui 阿貴		172	214	Xingguo (Qin'an County, Gansu)	Tribal leader	Di		Weilue annotation in Sanguozhi vol. 30.
Aluoduo 阿羅多					Tribal leader	Xianbei		Jin Shu vol. 3.
Aluopan 阿羅槃				Youbeiping (Tangshan, Hebei)	Noble	Wuhuan, Cao Wei		Weilue annotation in Sanguozhi vol. 30.
Awu 阿騖					Xun You's concubine			Sanguozhi vol. 29.
