= List of people of the Three Kingdoms (K) =

The following is a partial list of people significant to the Three Kingdoms period (220–280) of Chinese history. Their romanised names start with the letter K.

== K ==
Name	Courtesy name	Birth year	Death year	Ancestral home (present-day location)	Role	Allegiance	Previous allegiance(s)	Notes
Kan Ze 闞澤	Derun 德潤		243	Shanyin, Kuaiji (Southeast of Shaoxing, Zhejiang)	Politician, scholar	Eastern Wu		Sanguozhi vol. 53.
Kang Senghui 康僧會			280	Jiaozhi (northern Vietnam)	Monk, translator			
Kang Tai 康泰					Explorer	Eastern Wu		
Kebineng 軻比能			235		Tribal leader	Xianbei		Sanguozhi vol. 30.
Kewu 柯吾					Tribal leader	Qiang		
Kong Gui 孔桂	Shulin 叔林			Hanyang County (Tianshui, Gansu)	General	Cao Wei		
Kong Rong 孔融	Wenju 文舉	153	208	Lu (Qufu, Shandong)	Politician, scholar, warlord	Han dynasty		Houhanshu vol. 70.
Kong Shun 孔順					General	Yuan Shao		
Kong Xian 孔羡					Politician	Cao Wei		
Kong Xin 孔信				Tianshui (Gangu County, Gansu)	General	Cao Wei		
Kong Xun 孔恂	Shixin 士信			Luguo County (Qufu, Shandong)	General	Jin dynasty	Cao Wei	
Kong Yi 孔乂	Yuanjun 元俊			Luguo County (Qufu, Shandong)	Politician	Cao Wei		
Kong Yu 孔昱	Shiyuan 世元			Lu (Qufu, Shandong)	Politician	Han dynasty		
Kong Zhou 孔伷	Gongxu 公緒			Chenliu (Kaifeng, Henan)	Politician, warlord	Han dynasty		Sanguozhi vol. 1, 38.
Kouloudun 寇婁敦				Youbeiping County (Tangshan, Hebei)	Tribal leader	Wuhuan, Cao Wei		
Ku Qiu 苦蝤					Rebel leader	Yellow Turban rebels		
Lady Kuai 蒯夫人				Xiangyang (Xiangyang, Hubei)		Jin dynasty		
Kuai Jun 蒯鈞				Xiangyang (Xiangyang, Hubei)	General	Jin dynasty	Cao Wei	
Kuai Liang 蒯良	Zirou 子柔			Zhonglu, Nan (Nanzhang County, Hubei)	Advisor	Liu Biao		Sanguozhi vol. 6.
Kuai Qi 蒯祺					Politician	Liu Biao		
Kuai Yue 蒯越	Yidu 異度		214	Zhonglu, Nan (Nanzhang County, Hubei)	Advisor, politician	Cao Cao	Liu Biao	Sanguozhi vol. 6.
Kuang Changning 況長寧								
Kuang Qi 匡琦					General	Han dynasty		
Kuitou 魁頭					Tribal leader	Xianbei		
