= List of people of the Three Kingdoms (Q) =

The following is a partial list of people significant to the Three Kingdoms period (220–280) of Chinese history. Their romanised names start with the letter Q.

== Q ==
Name	Courtesy name	Birth year	Death year	Ancestral home (present-day location)	Role	Allegiance	Previous allegiance(s)	Notes
Qi Geng 祁庚				Kuaiji, Shanyin (Shaoxing, Zhejiang)				
Qi Ji 戚寄					General	Cao Cao	Yuan Shu	
Qiwenni 乞文泥			274		Tribal leader	Tufa Shujineng		Jin Shu vol. 3.
Qi Zhou 齊周					General	Han dynasty		
Qian Bo 錢博					General	Eastern Wu	Han dynasty	
Qian Hong 牽弘			271	Guanjin, Anping (East of Wuyi County, Hebei)	General	Jin dynasty	Cao Wei	
Qian Jia 牽嘉				Guanjin, Anping (East of Wuyi County, Hebei)	General	Cao Wei		
Qian Man 騫曼					Tribal leader	Xianbei		
Qian Qin 錢欽					Politician	Eastern Wu		
Qian Tong 錢銅				Wu County, Wucheng (Huzhou, Zhejiang)	Rebel leader			
Qian Xiu 牽秀	Chengshu 成叔			Guanjin, Anping (East of Wuyi County, Hebei)		Jin dynasty		Jin Shu vol. 60.
Qian Zhao 牽招	Zijing 子經			Guanjin, Anping (East of Wuyi County, Hebei)	General	Cao Wei	Han dynasty, Yuan Shao, Yuan Shang	Sanguozhi vol. 26.
Qiangduan 強端		168	237	Yinping (North of Wen County, Gansu)	Tribal leader	Di		
Qianwan 千萬		174	263	Longyou, Liangzhou (Cheng County, Gansu)	Tribal leader	Di		
Da Qiao 大喬				Wan County, Lujiang (Qianshan County, Anhui)				
Elder Qiao 喬公				Wan County, Lujiang (Qianshan County, Anhui)	Politician	Sun Quan	Han dynasty	
Xiao Qiao 小喬				Wan County, Lujiang (Qianshan County, Anhui)				
Qiao Mao 橋瑁	Yuanwei 元偉		190	Suiyang, Liang (South of Shangqiu, Henan)	Politician, warlord	Han dynasty		
Qiao Rui 橋蕤			197		General	Yuan Shu		
Qiao Tong 譙同				Xichong, Baxi (Langzhong, Sichuan)	Politician	Jin dynasty		
Qiao Xi 譙熙				Xichong, Baxi (Langzhong, Sichuan)		Jin dynasty		
Qiao Xian 譙賢				Xichong, Baxi (Langzhong, Sichuan)		Jin dynasty		
Qiao Xuan 橋玄	Gongzu 公祖	110	184	Suiyang, Liang (South of Shangqiu, Henan)	Politician	Han dynasty		Houhanshu vol. 51.
Qiao Zhou 譙周	Yunnan 允南	201	270	Xichong, Baxi (Langzhong, Sichuan)	Politician, scholar	Shu Han		Sanguozhi vol. 42.
Qiguan Jun 綦毌君					Scholar	Han dynasty		
Qiguan Kai 綦毌闓					Scholar, politician	Liu Biao	Han dynasty	
Qin Bo 秦博					Politician	Eastern Wu		
Qin Dan 秦旦					General	Eastern Wu		
Qin Huang 秦晃			241		General	Eastern Wu		
Qin Jian 禽堅				Shu County, Chengdu (Chengdu, Sichuan)		Han dynasty		
Qin Jie 秦頡	Chuqi 初起		186	Yicheng, Xiangyang (Yicheng, Hubei)	General	Han dynasty		
Qin Jing 秦靜					Scholar	Cao Wei		
Qin Lang 秦朗	Yuanming 元明			Yunzhong, Xinxing (Xinzhou, Shanxi)	General	Cao Wei		
Qin Lang 秦狼					Rebel leader			
Qin Liang 秦良					General	Cao Wei		
Qin Mi 秦宓	Zichi 子勑		226	Mianzhu, Guanghan (Mianzhu, Sichuan)	Politician	Shu Han		Sanguozhi vol. 38.
Qin Song 秦松	Wenbiao 文表			Guangling (Yangzhou, Jiangsu)	Advisor	Sun Quan	Sun Ce	
Qin Xie 秦絜					General	Cao Wei		
Qin Xiu 秦秀	Xuanlang 玄良			Yunzhong, Xinxing (Xinzhou, Shanxi)	Politician	Jin dynasty		Jin Shu vol. 50.
Qin Yi 秦誼					General	Lü Bu		
Qin Yi 秦翊					General	Cao Cao		
Qin Yilu 秦宜祿			199	Yunzhong, Xinxing (Xinzhou, Shanxi)	General	Cao Cao	Lü Bu	
Qingniu 青牛先生	Zhengfang 正方			Shandong (Mount Hua, Shaanxi)	Astronomer, scholar			
Qiu Jian 丘建				Luoyang (Luoyang, Henan)	General	Cao Wei		
Qiuliju 丘力居		152	193		Tribal leader	Wuhuan		
Qu Gan 屈幹				Runan County (Pingyu County, Henan)	General	Eastern Wu		
Qu Gong 屈恭				Runan County (Pingyu County, Henan)	General	Eastern Wu		
Qu Gong 瞿恭					Rebel leader			
Qu Guang 麴光/曲光				Xiping (Xining, Qinghai)	Rebel leader, general		Cao Wei	
Qu Huang 屈晃				Runan County (Pingyu County, Henan)	Politician	Eastern Wu		
Qu Mu 渠穆					Eunuch	Han dynasty		
Qu Sheng 麴勝/曲勝				Jincheng County (Yongjing County, Gansu)	General	Han dynasty		
Qu Xu 屈緒				Runan County (Pingyu County, Henan)	Politician	Eastern Wu		
Qu Yan 麴演			220	Xiping (Xining, Qinghai)	General	Cao Wei		
Qu Yi 麴義				Xiping (Xining, Qinghai)	General	Yuan Shao	Han Fu	
Qu Ying 麴英/曲英			227	Xiping (Xining, Qinghai)	Rebel leader, general		Cao Wei	
Quan Cong 全琮	Zihuang 子璜	198	249	Qiantang, Wu (West of Hangzhou, Zhejiang)	General	Eastern Wu		
Quan Duan 全端				Qiantang, Wu (West of Hangzhou, Zhejiang)	General	Cao Wei	Eastern Wu	
Quan Huijie 全惠解				Qiantang, Wu (West of Hangzhou, Zhejiang)	Empress	Eastern Wu		Sanguozhi vol. 50.
Quan Ji 全紀			258	Qiantang, Wu (West of Hangzhou, Zhejiang)	Politician	Eastern Wu		
Quan Ji 全寄			250	Qiantang, Wu (West of Hangzhou, Zhejiang)	Politician	Eastern Wu		
Quan Ji 全緝				Qiantang, Wu (West of Hangzhou, Zhejiang)	General	Cao Wei	Eastern Wu	
Quan Jing 全靜				Qiantang, Wu (West of Hangzhou, Zhejiang)	General	Cao Wei	Eastern Wu	
Quan Pian 全翩				Qiantang, Wu (West of Hangzhou, Zhejiang)	General	Cao Wei	Eastern Wu	
Quan Rou 全柔				Qiantang, Wu (West of Hangzhou, Zhejiang)	Politician	Sun Quan	Han dynasty, Sun Ce	
Quan Shang 全尚	Zizhen 子真			Qiantang, Wu (West of Hangzhou, Zhejiang)	Politician	Eastern Wu		
Quan Wensheng 圈文生				Chenliu County (Kaifeng, Henan)		Han dynasty		
Quan Wu 全吳				Qiantang, Wu (West of Hangzhou, Zhejiang)	Politician	Eastern Wu		
Quan Xu 全緒				Qiantang, Wu (West of Hangzhou, Zhejiang)	General	Eastern Wu		
Quan Yi 全禕				Qiantang, Wu (West of Hangzhou, Zhejiang)	General	Cao Wei	Eastern Wu	
Quan Yi 全懌				Qiantang, Wu (West of Hangzhou, Zhejiang)	General	Cao Wei	Eastern Wu	
Quan Yi 全儀				Qiantang, Wu (West of Hangzhou, Zhejiang)	General	Cao Wei	Eastern Wu	
Qubei 去卑			272		Tribal leader	Xiongnu		
Que Ji 闕機					Tribal leader	Xianbei		
Que Jian 卻儉			188	Henan	Politician	Han dynasty		
Que Xuan 闕宣				Xiapiguo (Suining County, Jiangsu)	Rebel leader, general	Tao Qian		
