= Wenxi County =

Wenxi County 闻喜县 Wensi
- County
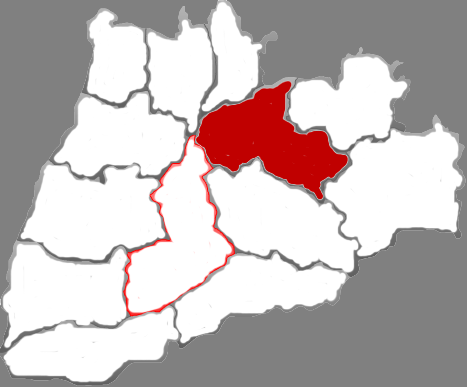
- Location in Yuncheng

- Location of the seat in Shanxi
- Coordinates: 35°23′24″N 111°18′27″E
- Country: People's Republic of China
- Province: Shanxi
- Prefecture-level city: Yuncheng

Population (2020)
  - Total: 355,269
- Time zone: UTC+8 (China Standard)
- Website: www.wenxi.gov.cn

Wenxi County (simplified Chinese: 闻喜县; traditional Chinese: 聞喜縣; pinyin: Wénxǐ Xiàn) is a county in southwestern Shanxi province, China. It is under the administration of the prefecture-level city of Yuncheng. As of 2020, it had a population of roughly 350,000.

The name Wenxi, which means "hearing the glad news", was used as the county name in 111 BC when Emperor Wu of Han, who on his royal progress at this place, heard Han's decisive victory in the Han–Nanyue War.

== Climate ==
Climate data for Wenxi, elevation 468 m (1,535 ft), (1991–2020 normals, extremes 1981–2010)
Month	Jan	Feb	Mar	Apr	May	Jun	Jul	Aug	Sep	Oct	Nov	Dec	Year
Record high °C (°F)	16.6 (61.9)	23.3 (73.9)	28.3 (82.9)	35.0 (95.0)	38.0 (100.4)	39.9 (103.8)	40.9 (105.6)	38.7 (101.7)	38.0 (100.4)	32.4 (90.3)	26.5 (79.7)	16.5 (61.7)	40.9 (105.6)
Mean daily maximum °C (°F)	5.0 (41.0)	9.5 (49.1)	15.7 (60.3)	22.1 (71.8)	27.0 (80.6)	31.5 (88.7)	32.3 (90.1)	30.5 (86.9)	25.9 (78.6)	19.9 (67.8)	12.7 (54.9)	6.3 (43.3)	19.9 (67.8)
Daily mean °C (°F)	−1.7 (28.9)	2.5 (36.5)	8.5 (47.3)	14.8 (58.6)	19.8 (67.6)	24.8 (76.6)	26.6 (79.9)	24.8 (76.6)	19.7 (67.5)	13.2 (55.8)	5.8 (42.4)	−0.4 (31.3)	13.2 (55.7)
Mean daily minimum °C (°F)	−6.7 (19.9)	−2.8 (27.0)	2.4 (36.3)	7.9 (46.2)	12.7 (54.9)	18.1 (64.6)	21.5 (70.7)	20.1 (68.2)	14.9 (58.8)	8.1 (46.6)	0.7 (33.3)	−5.4 (22.3)	7.6 (45.7)
Record low °C (°F)	−17.1 (1.2)	−18.7 (−1.7)	−11.5 (11.3)	−4.4 (24.1)	−0.2 (31.6)	8.3 (46.9)	14.2 (57.6)	11.5 (52.7)	1.9 (35.4)	−6.3 (20.7)	−12.9 (8.8)	−19.4 (−2.9)	−19.4 (−2.9)
Average precipitation mm (inches)	4.4 (0.17)	8.0 (0.31)	13.8 (0.54)	32.6 (1.28)	48.8 (1.92)	57.4 (2.26)	86.2 (3.39)	86.5 (3.41)	71.6 (2.82)	46.5 (1.83)	19.8 (0.78)	3.5 (0.14)	479.1 (18.85)
Average precipitation days (≥ 0.1 mm)	2.6	3.1	3.9	6.2	7.6	8.1	9.3	9.1	9.9	7.6	5.1	2.2	74.7
Average snowy days	3.9	3.0	1.2	0.1	0	0	0	0	0	0	1.3	2.5	12
Average relative humidity (%)	59	57	55	59	61	60	70	75	76	74	70	62	65
Mean monthly sunshine hours	147.1	151.7	188.0	219.7	238.9	226.5	224.9	201.0	161.3	157.6	146.7	149.6	2,213
Percentage possible sunshine	47	49	50	56	55	52	51	49	44	46	48	49	50
Source: China Meteorological Administration

== Archaeology ==
In June 2022, archaeologists announced a discovery of a 2.8 centimetres (1.1 in) long, 5,200-year-old stone carving chrysalis in a semi-crypt house at the Shangguo Site in the city of Yuncheng, Wenxi County. Archaeologists theorised that this house may have belonged to the Yangshao culture period, based on the unearthed pottery pieces. According to archaeologist Tian Jianwen, discovery of stone carving chrysalises provided significant information for the study of the silkworm culture and sericulture in China.
