= Changle County =

Changle County 昌乐县
- County
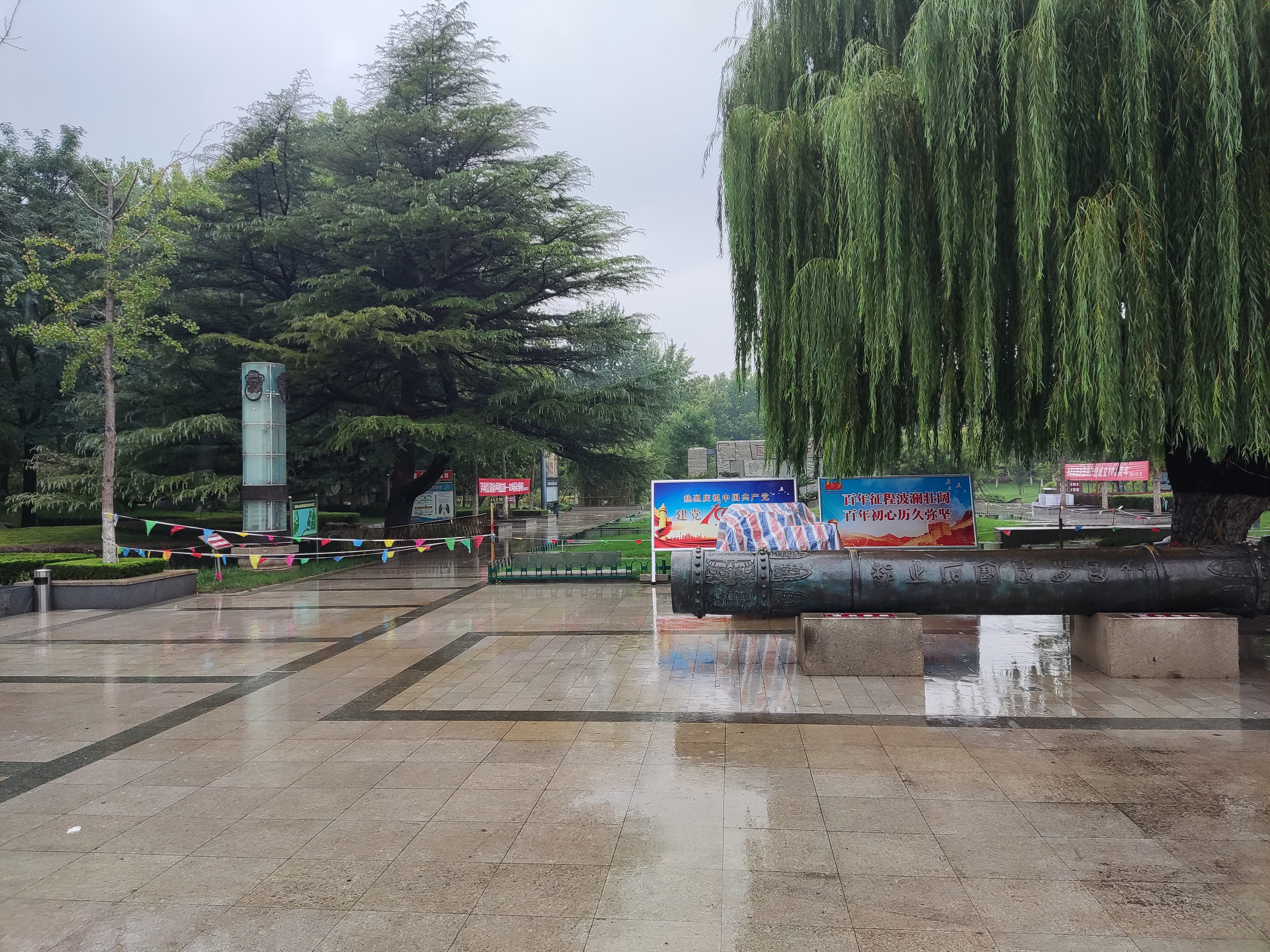

- Location of the seat in Shandong
- Coordinates: 36°42′N 118°45′E
- Country: People's Republic of China
- Province: Shandong
- Prefecture-level city: Weifang

Area
  - Total: 1,101 km^{2} (425 sq mi)

Population (2018)
  - Total: 638,000
  - Density: 579/km^{2} (1,500/sq mi)
- Time zone: UTC+8 (China Standard)
- Postal code: 262400

Changle County (simplified Chinese: 昌乐县; traditional Chinese: 昌樂縣; pinyin: Chānglè Xiàn) is under the administration of Weifang, in Shandong Province. The ancient Kingdom of Beihai was located to the west of present-day Changle County.

== Administrative divisions ==
As of 2017, this county is divided to 5 subdistricts and 4 towns.

Subdistricts

- Baodu Subdistrict (宝都街道)
- Baocheng Subdistrict (宝城街道)
- Zhuliu Subdistrict (朱刘街道)
- Chengnan Subdistrict (城南街道)
- Wutu Subdistrict (五图街道)

Towns

- Qiaoguan (乔官镇)
- Tangwu (唐吾镇)
- Honghe (红河镇)
- Yingqiu (营丘镇)

== Climate ==
Climate data for Changle, elevation 79 m (259 ft), (1991–2020 normals, extremes 1981–2010)
Month	Jan	Feb	Mar	Apr	May	Jun	Jul	Aug	Sep	Oct	Nov	Dec	Year
Record high °C (°F)	18.6 (65.5)	23.1 (73.6)	32.3 (90.1)	34.4 (93.9)	40.2 (104.4)	40.9 (105.6)	39.7 (103.5)	38.0 (100.4)	38.5 (101.3)	32.9 (91.2)	26.2 (79.2)	22.6 (72.7)	40.9 (105.6)
Mean daily maximum °C (°F)	3.5 (38.3)	7.3 (45.1)	14.0 (57.2)	21.0 (69.8)	26.5 (79.7)	30.5 (86.9)	31.5 (88.7)	30.2 (86.4)	26.9 (80.4)	20.9 (69.6)	12.8 (55.0)	5.5 (41.9)	19.2 (66.6)
Daily mean °C (°F)	−2.3 (27.9)	1.1 (34.0)	7.4 (45.3)	14.4 (57.9)	20.2 (68.4)	24.5 (76.1)	26.5 (79.7)	25.3 (77.5)	21.0 (69.8)	14.4 (57.9)	6.7 (44.1)	−0.2 (31.6)	13.3 (55.9)
Mean daily minimum °C (°F)	−6.7 (19.9)	−3.9 (25.0)	1.4 (34.5)	8.0 (46.4)	13.7 (56.7)	18.8 (65.8)	22.1 (71.8)	21.3 (70.3)	15.9 (60.6)	8.9 (48.0)	1.7 (35.1)	−4.6 (23.7)	8.1 (46.5)
Record low °C (°F)	−19.7 (−3.5)	−17.5 (0.5)	−11.0 (12.2)	−4.0 (24.8)	0.1 (32.2)	7.5 (45.5)	13.1 (55.6)	11.9 (53.4)	3.9 (39.0)	−3.2 (26.2)	−12.2 (10.0)	−24.2 (−11.6)	−24.2 (−11.6)
Average precipitation mm (inches)	8.9 (0.35)	13.2 (0.52)	11.3 (0.44)	30.4 (1.20)	55.1 (2.17)	70.4 (2.77)	145.4 (5.72)	175.7 (6.92)	54.5 (2.15)	29.2 (1.15)	28.6 (1.13)	11.4 (0.45)	634.1 (24.97)
Average precipitation days (≥ 0.1 mm)	3.1	3.7	3.4	5.1	7.0	8.6	12.0	11.7	7.0	5.1	4.8	4.0	75.5
Average snowy days	4.1	3.3	1.6	0.2	0	0	0	0	0	0	1.4	2.6	13.2
Average relative humidity (%)	62	59	51	52	59	64	77	81	75	68	66	63	65
Mean monthly sunshine hours	165.3	169.5	221.2	241.3	260.6	224.2	195.0	186.7	192.7	194.9	167.6	165.9	2,384.9
Percentage possible sunshine	53	55	59	61	59	51	44	45	52	57	55	56	54
Source: China Meteorological Administration
