= Fangshi =

Ancient Chinese term for a technical specialist

Fangshi (Chinese: 方士; pinyin: fāngshì; lit. 'method master') were Chinese technical specialists who flourished from the third century BCE to the fifth century CE. English translations of fangshi include alchemist, astrologer, diviner, exorcist, geomancer, doctor, magician, monk, mystic, necromancer, occultist, omenologist, physician, physiognomist, technician, technologist, thaumaturge, and wizard.

== Etymology ==
The Chinese word fangshi (方士) combines fang (方; "direction; side; locality; place; region; formula; (medical) prescription; recipe; method; way") and shi (士; "scholar; intelligentsia; gentleman; officer; yeoman; soldier; person trained in a certain field").

Many English-language texts transliterate this word as fangshi (older texts use fangshih), but some literally translate it.

- "gentlemen possessing magical recipes"
- "recipe gentlemen"
- "masters of recipes"
- "'direction-scholar', that is, one versed in interpreting omens from their orientation" [from fengjiao "wind angle" divination below]
- "Esoteric Masters"
- "gentleman who possess techniques, technician"
- "masters of recipes and methods"
- "masters of methods"
- "masters of esoterica"

The Chinese historian Yu Ying-shi concludes that "as a general term, fang-shih may be translated 'religious Taoists' or 'popular Taoists,' since all such arts were later incorporated in the Taoist religion. Only in specific cases depending on contexts, should the term be translated 'magicians,' 'alchemists,' or 'immortalists.'" Fangshi "is an elusive term that defies a consistent translation"

There is general agreement that the shi in fangshi (方士) means "master; gentleman; trained specialist" (cf. 道士; Daoshi; "Daoist priest; diviner"), but considerable disagreement about the meaning of fang.

The etymology of fangshi is "subject to various interpretations", writes DeWoskin.

By the end of the Later Chou, there are several occurrences of the word "fang" in two new binomes, fang-shu [方書] and fang-shuo [方說], literally, "fang books" and "fang theories". The word "fang" in its various common contexts meant "efficacious," "formulaic," "parallel," "correlative," "comparative," "medicinal," "spiritual," or "esoteric." Throughout archaic times, the word also occurs commonly in the compound ssu-fang [四方], meaning four outlying areas, and hence refers to people, places, and cultures removed from the central court. Each of these meanings is potentially a factor in the etymology of the term."

Harper says "DeWoskin's attempt at a definition for fang shih which admits every possible meaning of fang into its analysis renders the term meaningless".

Whatever fang or shih as separate words meant in an earlier period, when they were combined to form the name for wonder-workers who gathered at the Ch'in and Han courts, the name expressed some essential quality of these people. Automatically most of the meanings for fang which DeWoskin claims are "potentially a factor in the etymology of the term" can be eliminated, especially the series "parallel, correlative, comparative." In analyzing the term fang shih, earlier scholars have focused primarily on the meaning "method" or "tablet on which a method is recorded, recipe," in which case fang shih means "master possessing methods" or "master possessing recipes."

Based upon words that Han texts use to describe occult practices, fangshu (方書; "recipe book; treatise on an art/skill; collection of medical prescriptions") and fangban (方板; "recipe tablet; treatise on an art/skill"), Harper concludes, "The possession of writings containing occult knowledge which might be revealed to select patrons was the chief characteristic of all who were known as fang shih." Describing the background of fangshi, DeWoskin suggests an "other" etymology.

It is possible to group the antecedents of fang-shih thought and techniques into three distinct areas: astrology and calendrics; the practices of wu mediums and conjury; and pharmaceutical and hygienic medicine. Virtually all the fang-shih prominent enough to be included in dynastic histories specialized in only one of these areas. Because the three areas are not historically related, and the typical fang-shih does not embrace them all, the grouping suggests that the common sense of the name fang-shih was somewhat akin to "others," and did not attach to any readily definable school or tradition.

Harper also faults this hypothesis, concluding, "A more judicious examination could not lead to this sort of reductio ad absurdum."

Summarizing how Chinese authors used the word fangshi from the Han through the Song dynasties, Sivin lists four general criteria.

1. The fang-shih usually belonged to the tiny privileged segment of the population who could read books and leave records. The writings we have, not a random sample, are of high literary quality. Early stories about technicians often have them confounding philosophers. The fang-shih usually came from a family that we know held official rank, even in periods when such rank was normally hereditary.
2. The fang-shih himself did not usually hold high rank in the regular civil service. If he did, it tended to be obtained irregularly, most often as an imperial gesture. Someone who reached a high post through a conventional career, although he might have considerable mechanical skill, scientific knowledge, or mastery of the occult, was not often called a fang-shih. ...
3. The fang-shih did not strive for the personal goals that the well-born expected of their own kind. He usually held conventional moral and political opinions, if we can rely on the record, but the stigma of inappropriate technical enthusiasms, however faint, is commonly visible. Someone in a conspicuous position of orthodoxy, regardless of technical expertise, was not considered a fang-shih.
4. The fang-shih had powers only rarely seen in the orthodox literatus – to foresee the future, to arrogate to himself the shaping and transforming powers of natural process (tsao hua 造化), and so on. At the same time descriptions of him never limn the full humanity, the mastery of the social Way, of the more conventional great.

== History ==
Fangshi are first recorded in early Chinese canonical Twenty-Four Histories: Sima Qian's (c. 91 BCE) Shiji (史記; "Records of the Grand Historian"), Ban Gu's (82 CE) Hanshu (漢書; "Book of Han"), Chen Shou's (289 CE) Sanguozhi (三國志; "Records of Three Kingdoms"), and Fan Ye's (445 CE) Houhanshu (後漢書; "Book of Later Han"). DeWoskin translated fangshi biographies from the latter three histories, but some reviewers criticized him for ignoring Ngo's French translation of the same biographies.

These historical texts document that during the late Warring States period (475–221 BCE), fangshi originated in northern China and specialized in xian (仙; "immortality; transcendence") techniques. During the Qin dynasty (221–206 BCE) and Han dynasty (206 BCE – 220 CE), fangshi were patronized by emperors who sought the elixir of immortality. By the middle of the Six Dynasties Period (220–569 CE), the role of fangshi had declined and their techniques had been adapted into Daoist religion and traditional Chinese medicine.

The word fangshi first appears in the Fengshan shu (封禪書; "Treatise on the Feng and Shan Sacrifices") of the "Records of the Grand Historian". This context concerns Qin Shi Huang (r. 221–210 BCE), the first Qin emperor traveling and performing sacrifices in the northeastern coastal states of Qi (齊) and Yan (燕) (present-day Shandong, Hebei, and Liaoning). During the era of King Wei (r. c. 356–320 BCE) and King Xuan (r. 319–301 BCE) of Qi and King Zhao (r. 311–279 BCE) of Yan, fangshi claimed to have studied the techniques of Zou Yan, who systematized Yin-Yang and the Five Phases.

Song Wuji, Zhengbo Qiao, Chong Shang, Xianmen Gao, and Zui Hou were all men of Yan who practiced magic and followed the way of the immortals, discarding their mortal forms and changing into spiritual beings by means of supernatural aid. Zou Yan won fame among the feudal lords for his theories of the yin and yang and the succession of the five elements, but the [方士] magicians who lived along the seacoast of Qi and Yan, though they claimed to transmit his teachings, were unable to understand them. Thus from this time there appeared a host of men, too numerous to mention, who expounded all sorts of weird and fantastic theories and went to any lengths to flatter the rulers of the day and to ingratiate themselves with them.

Compare Welch's translation, "they practiced the Tao of recipes and immortality (fang hsien tao [方僊道]).Their bodies were released, dissolved, and transformed. They relied on serving ghosts (kuei [鬼]) and spirits (shen [神])." These early fangshi asserted to know of three divine mountains where the elixir of immortality existed, Penglai 蓬萊, Fangzhang 方丈, and Yingzhou 瀛洲 in the Bohai Sea.

From the age of Kings Wei and Xuan of Qi and King Zhao of Yan, men were sent from time to time to set out to sea and search for the islands of Penglai, Fangzhang, and Yingzhou. These were three spirit mountains which were supposed to exist in the Gulf of Bohai. They were not very far from the land of men, it was said, but the difficulty was that, whenever a boat was about to touch their shores, a wind would always spring up and drive it away. In the past, people said, there had been men who succeeded in reaching them, and found them peopled by fairy sprits who possessed the elixir of immortality. All the plants and birds and animals of the islands were white, and the palaces and gates were made of gold and silver. Seen from afar, the three spirit mountains looked like clouds but, as one drew closer, they seemed instead to be down under the water. In any event, as soon as anyone got near to them, the wind would suddenly come and drag the boat away, so that in the end no one could ever reach them.

The Shiji also records that the Qin emperor dispatched the fangshi Xu Fu 徐福 to obtain the elixir of life from the xian Anqi Sheng, who lived on Mount Penglai in 219 BCE, and then sent Lu Sheng 盧生 "Master Lu" in 215 BCE. The emperor subsequently dispatched three other fangshi expeditions to the spirit islands, but none returned to China.

Emperor Wu of Han (r. 141–87 BCE) lavishly patronized fangshi, writes DeWoskin, "to such an extent that virtually anyone with a plausible 'secret tradition' rushed to court to collect his reward". Emperor Wu's uncle and advisor Liu An (179–122 BCE, compiler of the Huainanzi) gathered "several thousand" fangshi and compiled their techniques of shenxian (神仙; "spirit transcendence")and huangbai (黃白; "alchemy"). Two famous fangshi advised Emperor Wu to emulate the legendary Yellow Emperor's practices. The alchemist Li Shaojun attempted to recreate the Yellow Emperor's rite to transform cinnabar into gold. The architect Gongyu Dai 公玉帶 claimed to have the Yellow Emperor's plans for a 12-story pentagonal hall, which Emperor Wu had rebuilt in 102 BCE.

Csikszentmihalyi elucidates the fangshi category's chronological development by contrasting its place in these early Chinese histories. In the Records of the Grand Historian, "the methods (方; fang) used by the fangshi generally concerned demons and spirits: methods for retreating from old age (却老方; quelao fang), methods involving demons and gods (鬼神方; guishen fang), and methods for gods, monsters and anomalies (神怪奇方; shen guai qi fang)." The Book of Later Han chapter on fangshi broadened the category to include omen and portent techniques such as fengjiao (風角; "wind angles"). The Records of Three Kingdoms combined the Han historical categories of fangshi (方士) and shushu (數術; "numbers and arts (divination and omenology)") into a chapter on fangshu (方術; "methods and arts"). "Thus, the fangshi, originally experts in matters of the spirits, came by the late Han to include the ubiquitous experts in detecting shifts in the balance of the natural world."

方士 Fangshi originated in southern China. Sin was punished by ailments in the view of the Heavenly Masters. The Shangqing syncretized the Heavenly Masters with fangshi. Buddhism, Fangshi, and Heavenly Masters were synchronized in Lingbao. Buddhism, Celestial Masters and fangshi all contributed to the religious canon of Lingbao. Celestial Master petitions to divinities were copied by the canon of the Lingbao and fangshi rites were also copied by them.

== Techniques ==
Fangshi employed numerous techniques, methods, and practices. DeWoskin lists forty-two mentioned in historical biographies of fangshi. Some are familiar (e.g., 遁甲; dunjia; "Evading Stems; sexagenary cycle divination" and 巫醫; wuyi; "Medium Healing; shamanic medicine"), while others are obscure. For instance, DeWoskin explains fengjiao (風角; "Wind Angles") divination.

Wind Angles (Feng-chiao): The wind from eight angles (four sides and four corners) is observed for its direction, strength, and other qualities. ... The nature of the analysis is still to be determined, but some sources link the practice to expertise in the five tones (wu-yin), specifically the ability to hear and differentiate pitches that are inaudible to most people.

Csikszentmihalyi clarifies fengjiao. "This practice, which may date back to the Shang dynasty, involves using the temperature, strength, and changes in direction in seasonal winds to determine the local increase and decrease in Yin and Yang qi." The Yinqueshan Han Slips, discovered in 1972, contain manuscripts about fengjiao and nayin (納音; "Matching Sounds").

Citing examples of the techniques named tuibu (推步; "astrology") and tingzhuan (筳篿; "cleromancy"), Harper says "inaccuracy abounds" in DeWoskin's translations.

What is the reader to think, for example, when DeWoskin translates the term t'ui pu as "astral influences" and explains that it relates to "projections from sky readings" (p. 23)? A more literal rendering of t'ui pu would be "plotting the paces" and the term refers primarily to determining the paths of the sun, moon, and planets. T'ing chuan ("bamboo twisters" in DeWoskin's translation) is identified as "a type of crack making" and DeWoskin gives the following fuller description of the technique: "This technique is one of a number of crack and fracture-reading approaches. Sections of bamboo are broken and the resultant cracks are read" (p. 27). In fact, t'ing chuan refers to a form of divination by lots, similar to divination with yarrow stalks, in which the counters are slivers of broken bamboo or sometimes twigs broken off plants. DeWoskin appears to have made up his own explanation. His brief summations of other techniques are similarly uninformative or inaccurate.

Some fangshi practices like shefu (射覆; "shoot cover") were closer to parlor magic than esoteric techniques. DeWoskin explains

The repertory by which fang-shih won their patronage included not only storytelling, but glib dissertations on astrology, omenology, and esoteric philosophy and various performances of magical arts. The histories record many instances of a fang-shih challenge game, she-fu 射覆, where masters the likes of Tung-fang Shuo, Kuan Lu 管輅, and Guo P'u 郭璞 (276–324) guessed the identity of hidden objects before gatherings of dinner guests or skeptical officials.

== Notable fangshi ==
Many famous fangshi "method masters" are considered Daoists.

- Xu Fu 徐福 (fl. 219–210 BCE), sent by Qin Shi Huang to find elixir of immortality
- Luan Da 栾大 (d. 112 BCE), professed to know the secrets to immortality, transmutation of gold, and power over the Yellow River
- Gan Ji 干吉 (c. 2nd century CE), Daoist priest
- Zuo Ci 左慈 (c. 3rd century CE), Daoist master, teacher of Ge Xuan
- Ge Xuan 葛玄 (164–244), Daoist master, grandfather of Ge Hong
- Guan Lu 管輅 (209–256), famous diviner
- Guo Pu 郭璞 (276–324), commentator and author
- Ge Hong 葛洪 (283–343), Daoist author of the Baopuzi
- Elder Zhang Guo 張果老, (c. mid 8th century), one of the Eight Immortals
- Chen Tuan 陳摶 (c. 920–989), Daoist master, originator of Liuhebafa gungfu

The term fangshi sometimes occurs in contemporary usage. For instance, Wong applies the fangshi tradition to explain the author Liu E 劉鶚 and his (1904) novel the Travels of Lao Can.

== Connections ==
The fangshi tradition has diverse origins and affiliations. When first recorded around the fourth century BCE, fangshi were connected with Zhou dynasty astrology, divination, and record-keeping. During the Qin and Han dynasties, fangshi developed many new techniques, which were gradually absorbed by Daoist religions (e.g., Shangqing School), Daoist movements (e.g., Way of the Five Pecks of Rice), Chinese alchemy (both internal Neidan and external Waidan), Buddhist meditation, and traditional Chinese medicine.

"The genealogy of the fangshi is complex", Robinet writes. "They go back to the archivist-soothsayers of antiquity, one of whom supposedly was Laozi himself; under the Shang and Zhou they were the only ones who knew divination and writing". DeWoskin describes how the fangshi consolidated several ancient Chinese traditions.

Their divination practices can be traced back to late Shang-dynasty oracle-bone culture, Chou-dynasty milfoil-stalk procedures, and Chou astrological and calendric technology. This historical connection between divination practices, especially calendric and astrological types, and the chronicling of events is reflected in the conspicuous literacy of the fang-shih and their propensity for authoring biographical, geographical, and other narratives. Their medical practices combine elements of the Confucian medical tradition (ju-i 儒醫) and popular medical practices, derived in large part from shamanic ritual. Hence they practiced a range of therapies from acupuncture and pharmacology to incantation and talismanic exorcism. Their immortality practices encompass both alchemical (wai-tan 外丹) and hygienic (nei-tan 內丹) techniques adumbrated in the Taoist classics and elaborated in the emerging religious Taoist movements.

Daoist religions appropriated many fangshi techniques. Holmes Welch hypothesized that Daoism was a river that united four streams of philosophy, hygiene, alchemy, and Penglai mythology. fangshi are associated with the latter two.

It was probably between 350 and 250 B.C. that the names of Lao Tzu, Chuang Tzu, and Lieh Tzu became associated with what we shall call "philosophical Taoism"; their books testified in turn to the existence of a "hygiene school," which cultivated longevity through breathing exercises and gymnastics; early in the same period the theory of the Five Elements was propounded by Tsou Yen, whose followers are thought to have started research on the elixir of life; and lastly, along the northeastern coasts of China, ships began to sail out in search of the Isles of the Blest, hoping to return with the mushroom that "prevented death".

Welch concludes that fangshi developed alchemy, "although Tsou Yen gradually acquired alchemistical stature, he himself knew nothing of the art. It was probably developed by those of his followers who became interested in physical experimentation with the Five Elements. The first elixir they developed was cinnabar, or mercuric sulphide".

Joseph Needham traced the origins of Daoism to an alliance between fangshi, wu (巫; "shamans; doctors") and philosophers such as Laozi and Zhuangzi:

At the heart of ancient Taoism there was an artisanal element, for both the wizards and the philosophers were convinced that important and useful things could be achieved by using one's hands. They did not participate in the mentality of the Confucian scholar-administrator, who sat on high in his tribunal issuing orders and never employing his hands except in reading and writing. This is why it came about that wherever in ancient China one finds the sprouts of any of the natural sciences the Taoists are sure to be involved. The fang shih 方士 or 'gentlemen possessing magical recipes' were certainly Taoist, and they worked in all kinds of directions as star-clerk and weather-forecasters, men of farm-lore and wort-cunning, irrigators and bridge-builders, architects and decorators, but above all alchemists. Indeed the beginning of all alchemy rests with them if we define it, as surely we should, as the combination of macrobiotics and aurifaction.

Needham defined his "carefully chosen" words: macrobiotics "the belief that, with the aid of botany, zoology, mineralogy, and alchemy, it is possible to prepare drugs or elixirs which will prolong life, giving longevity (shou 壽) or immortality (pu ssu 不死)" and aurifaction "the belief that it is possible to make gold from other quite different substances, notably the ignoble metals".

Csikszentmihalyi summarizes Daoist-fangshi connections,

The "methods" of the fangshi may be seen as forerunners of organized Taoist practices on several levels. In the Han, the concept of the Dao served to explain the efficacy of the myriad of newly forming disciplines, and many of these disciplines were the province of the fangshi. This explains why the term daoshi (道士; "masters of the Dao") was already beginning to replace the term fangshi (方士) in the Hanshu, resulting in its gradual eclipse of the latter term. On a more concrete level, many specific techniques of spirit transcendence, medicine, and alchemy initially used by fangshi found their way into later Taoist practice.

== Criticism ==
Gu Yong 谷永 (d. 8 BCE), minister to Emperor Cheng of Han, specialist on the Yijing, is known for harsh criticism of the contemporary fangshi practices:

All those occultists, who turn their backs on the right path of benevolence and correct duty, who do not revere the model of the Five Classics but who rather are brimming with claims about the strange and marvelous, about spirits and ghosts, who stand in unquestioning reverence of the sacrificial practices of every locale,... who say that immortals are to be found in this world and who imbibe all manner of longevity drugs, who capriciously set out on distant quests and travel so high that their shadows are cast upwards,... who have mastered the transformation of base metal to gold, who have made uniform the five colors and five stores within their bodies — those occultists cheat people and delude the masses.

== See also ==
- Fangxiangshi
- Chinese ritual mastery traditions
- Daoshi
