= Wang Chong (Shu Han) =

3rd century Shu Han official and scholar

- 王崇

Administrator of Shangyong (上庸太守)
- In office ?–?
- Monarch: Sima Yan

Administrator of Shu Commandery (蜀郡太守)
- In office ?–?
- Monarch: Sima Yan

Masters of Writing (尚書郎)
- In office ?–?
- Monarch: Sima Yan

Personal details
- Born: Unknown; Guanghan, Sichuan
- Died: Unknown
- Relations: Wang Tang (ancestor); Wang Shang (grandfather); Wang Hua (brother); Wang Zhen (brother); Wang Dai (brother)
- Parent: Wang Peng (father)
- Occupation: Official, scholar
- Courtesy name: Youyuan (幼遠)

Wang Chong (fl. 250s–270s), courtesy name Youyuan, was an official and scholar of the state of Shu Han in the Three Kingdoms period of China. After the fall of Shu in 263, he continued serving under the Jin dynasty, that succeeded Cao Wei state in 266.

== Life ==
Wang Chong was born in Qi, Guanghan Commandery (廣漢郡), which is present-day Guanghan, Sichuan. Wang Chong had three brothers, the eldest was Wang Hua. Then, the second brother was Wang Zhen (王振), whose courtesy name, was Zhongyuan (仲遠). He was known as a man of virtue and high reputation. He was appointed as Prefect of Guangdu (廣都令) and Administrator of Ba Commandery (巴郡太守). The third brother was Wang Dai (王岱), whose courtesy name, was Jiyuan (季遠). He was diligent in his official duties. He successively served as Prefect (令) of Guangyang (廣陽) and Zuotang (作唐) before his untimely death.

Wang Chong was the youngest brother. He was a man of profound learning and tolerance toward other views. Moreover, he was known for his elegance and noble character. When he was an official in Shu Han, Wang Chong served in the Dongguanlang (東觀郎; eastern office responsible for compiling the historical text).

Following Cao Wei's abdication to Jin, he assisted the Bieja (別駕; important assistant to the governor of the province) of Liang Province, was recommended as a xiucai (秀才; person who passed the county level imperial exam) and appointed as Gentleman of the Masters of Writing (尚書郎). Wang Chong entered the capital Luoyang alongside other famous Shu Han officials. Shou Liang, Li Mi, Chen Shou, Li Xiang, and Du Lie. They were regarded as the outstanding talents from Liang and Yi provinces. Although, the six of them had a deep friendship. They became estrangled from each other. However, Wang Chong because of his tolerance and impartiality managed to keep his relation with them until the end. Wang Chong's official career culminated when he became Administrator (太守) of Shangyong (上庸) and Shu Commandery (蜀郡).

== Anecdote ==
Throughout his life, Wang Chong authored the Book of Shu (蜀書; records of Shu) and dozens of other poems and essays. His works differed significantly from those of Chen Shou.

When Liu Shan's son, Liu Xun (劉恂) didn't change his immoral attitude that almost costed him his position. Wang Chong was among those who chastised him to reflect on Wen Li's advice.

== See also ==
- Lists of people of the Three Kingdoms
