= List of people of the Three Kingdoms (W) =

The following is a partial list of people significant to the Three Kingdoms period (220–280) of Chinese history. Their romanised names start with the letter W.

== W ==
Name	Courtesy name	Birth year	Death year	Ancestral home (present-day location)	Role	Allegiance	Previous allegiance(s)	Notes
Wan Bing 萬秉					Rebel leader	Yellow Turban rebels		
Wan Qian 萬潛					General, politician	Cao Cao	Han dynasty	
Wan Tai 萬泰					General	Eastern Wu		
Wan Yan 萬演					General	Han dynasty		
Wan Yu 萬彧			273		Politician	Eastern Wu		
Empress Wang 王皇后					Empress	Cao Wei		
Wang, Empress Dayi 大懿皇后王氏				Langya (Jiaonan, Shandong)	Noble lady	Eastern Wu		
Wang, Empress Jinghuai 敬懷皇后王氏				Nanyang (Nanyang, Henan)	Noble lady	Eastern Wu		
Wang Bao 王豹				Qucheng, Donglai (Zhaoyuan City, Shandong)	Politician	Cao Cao		
Wang Bi 王弼	Fusi 輔嗣	226	249	Gaoping, Shanyang (Zoucheng, Shandong)	Politician, xuanxue scholar	Cao Wei		
Wang Bi 王必			218		General	Cao Cao		
Wang Bi 王毖					Politician	Cao Wei		
Wang Biao 王表			252	Luoyang (Rui'an, Zhejiang)	Politician	Eastern Wu		
Wang Bin 王斌				Zhaoguo (Handan, Hebei)	Politician	Han dynasty		
Wang Bu 王布					General	Jin dynasty		
Wang Cai 王才					General	Cao Wei		
Wang Can 王粲	Zhongxuan 仲宣	177	217	Gaoping, Shanyang (Zoucheng, Shandong)	Advisor, politician, scholar	Cao Cao	Liu Biao, Liu Cong	Sanguozhi vol. 21.
Wang Chang 王昶	Wenshu 文舒		259	Jinyang County, Taiyuan (Taiyuan, Shanxi)	General, politician	Cao Wei		Sanguozhi vol. 27.
Wang Chang 王昌					General	Dong Zhuo		
Wang Chen 王晨				Qi County, Taiyuan (Qi County, Shanxi)		Cao Wei		
Wang Cheng 王承					General	Han dynasty		
Wang Cheng 王晟				Jiaxing (Jiaxing, Zhejiang)	Rebel leader, politician		Han dynasty	
Wang Chong 王沖				Guanghan (Xindu, Sichuan)	General	Cao Wei	Shu Han	
Wang Chong 王崇					General	Cao Wei	Eastern Wu	
Wang Chong 王崇	Youyuan 幼遠	220		Guanghan County (Guanghan, Sichuan)	General	Jin dynasty	Shu Han	Huayang Guo Zhi vol. 11. 07.
Wang Dai 王岱	Jiyuan 季遠	202		Guanghan County (Guanghan, Sichuan)	General	Shu Han	Huayang Guo Zhi vol. 11. 07.	
Wang Dan 王旦					Diviner	Han dynasty		
Wang Dang 王當					Bandit	Black Mountain bandits		
Wang Demi 王德彌					Politician	Han dynasty		
Wang Ding 王定				Jiyin County (Dingtao County, Shandong)		Han dynasty		
Wang Du 王度					Rebel leader			
Wang Dun 王惇					General	Eastern Wu		
Wang Fan 王蕃	Yongyuan 永元	228	266	Lujiang (Southwest of Lujiang County, Anhui)	Astronomer, mathematician, politician	Eastern Wu		Sanguozhi vol. 65.
Wang Fang 王方		153	192		General	Li Jue	Dong Zhuo	
Wang Fang 王訪				Shanyang County (Jining, Shandong)		Han dynasty		
Wang Fangping 王方平					Politician	Han dynasty		
Wang Feixiao 王飛梟				Qi County, Taiyuan (Qi County, Shanxi)	General	Cao Wei		
Wang Fen 王芬					Politician	Han dynasty		
Wang Fu 王甫	Guoshan 國山		222	Qi, Guanghan (Santai County, Sichuan)	Advisor, politician	Shu Han	Liu Zhang	
Wang Gong 王肱					Politician	Han dynasty		
Wang Gongzhong 王公仲					General	Cao Wei		
Wang Guan 王觀	Weitai 偉臺		260	Linqiu, Dong (Southeast of Fan County, Henan)	Politician	Cao Wei		Sanguozhi vol. 24.
Wang Guang 王廣	Gongyuan 公淵			Qi County, Taiyuan (Qi County, Shanxi)	General	Cao Wei		
Wang Guo 王國				Dongping (Dongping County, Shandong)	Politician	Cao Cao		
Wang Guo 王國				Liangzhou (Wuwei, Gansu)	General	Han dynasty		
Wang Hai 王海				Yuzhang County (Nanchang, Jiangxi)	Rebel leader			
Wang Han 王含					General	Shu Han		
Wang Heping 王和平				Beihaiguo (Changle County, Shandong)	Fangshi, Taoist			Houhanshu vol. 82. (Part.2)
Wang Hong 王宏	Zhengzong 正宗		284	Shanyang County (Jinxiang County, Shandong)	Politician	Jin dynasty	Cao Wei	
Wang Hongzhi 王弘直					Politician	Cao Wei		
Wang Hua 王化	Boyuan 伯遠			Guanghan County (Guanghan, Sichuan)	General	Jin dynasty	Shu Han	Huayang Guo Zhi vol. 11. 07.
Wang Hui 王徽				Qucheng, Donglai (Zhaoyuan City, Shandong)	Politician	Cao Wei		
Wang Huiyang 王惠陽				Dongpingguo (Dongping County, Shandong)	Politician	Cao Wei		
Wang Hun 王渾	Xuanchong 玄沖	223	297	Jinyang, Taiyuan (Taiyuan, Shanxi)	General	Jin dynasty	Cao Wei	Jin Shu vol. 42.
Wang Hun 王渾				Linyi (Linyi, Shandong)	Politician	Jin dynasty		
Wang Ji 王基	Boyu 伯輿	190	261	Qucheng, Donglai (Zhaoyuan City, Shandong)	General	Cao Wei		Sanguozhi vol. 27.
Wang Ji 王濟	Wuzi 武子			Jinyang, Taiyuan (Taiyuan, Shanxi)	General, politician	Jin dynasty		
Wang Ji 王寄					Politician	Cao Wei		
Wang Ji 王機				Jinyang County, Taiyuan (Taiyuan, Shanxi)	Politician	Cao Wei		
Wang Jia 王嘉					General	Cao Wei		
Wang Jian 王建			238		Politician	Gongsun Yuan	Cao Wei	
Wang Jian 王簡				Xuantu County, Gaoxian (Tieling, Liaoning)	Politician	Cao Wei		
Wang Jin 王金					Rebel leader			
Wang Jing 王靖				Guangling County (Yangzhou, Jiangsu)	Politician	Eastern Wu		
Wang Jing 王經	Yanwei 彥緯		260	Qinghe (East of Linqing, Liaocheng, Shandong)	General, politician	Cao Wei		
Wang Jinhu 王金虎			251	Qi County, Taiyuan (Qi County, Shanxi)	General	Cao Wei		
Wang Jiuzhen 王九真					Weiqi player			
Wang Jun 王濬	Shizhi 士治	206	286	Hu, Hongnong (West of Lingbao, Henan)	General	Jin dynasty		Jin Shu vol. 42.
Wang Jun 王雋					Politician	Han dynasty		
Wang Jun 王儁	Ziwen 子文			Runan County (Pingyu County, Henan)				
Wang Kai 王楷					Advisor	Lü Bu	Cao Cao	
Wang Kai 王凱				Shanyang County (Weishan County, Shandong)		Liu Biao		
Wang Kai 王愷	Junfu 君夫			Tan County, Donghai (Tancheng County, Shandong)	General, politician	Jin dynasty	Cao Wei	
Wang Kang 王伉				Shu (Chengdu, Sichuan)	General	Shu Han		
Wang Kang 王康				Donghai County, Tan (Linyi, Tancheng County, Shandong)		Jin dynasty		
Wang Kao 王考	Wenzu 文祖			Shouzhang, Dongpingguo (Dongping County, Shandong)	Politician	Han dynasty		
Wang Kuang 王匡	Gongjie 公節			Taishan (Northeast of Tai'an, Shandong)	Politician, warlord	Wang Kuang	Han dynasty	
Wang Kui 王夔					Politician	Cao Wei		
Wang Kui 王悝				Jiyang County, Linqiu (Yuncheng County, Shandong)	Politician	Cao Wei		
Wang Lan 王覽	Xuantong 玄通	206	278		Politician	Jin dynasty		
Wang Lang 王朗	Jingxing 景興		228	Tan County, Donghai (Tancheng County, Shandong)	Politician, warlord	Cao Wei	Han dynasty	Sanguozhi vol. 13.
Wang Lang 王朗					General	Cao Wei		
Wang Lei 王累			211	Guanghan (Xindu, Sichuan)	Advisor	Liu Zhang		
Wang Li 王立					Politician	Han dynasty		
Wang Li 王黎				Changshanguo, Gaoyi (Xingtai, Hebei)	Politician	Cao Wei		
Wang Li 王離	Boyuan 伯元			Guanghan County (Guanghan, Sichuan)	General, politician	Shu Han		
Wang Lian 王連	Wenyi 文儀			Nanyang (Nanyang, Henan)	Politician	Shu Han	Liu Zhang	Sanguozhi vol. 41.
Wang Lie 王烈	Yanfang 彦方	141	218	Pingyuan (Pingyuan, Shandong)	Politician	Han dynasty		Houhanshu vol. 81.
Wang Ling 王凌	Yanyun 彥雲	171	251	Qi County, Taiyuan (Qi County, Shanxi)	General, politician	Cao Wei		Sanguozhi vol. 28.
Wang Ling 王靈				Wudu (Cheng County, Gansu)	General	Cao Wei		
Wang Long 王隆				Donghai County, Tan (Linyi, Tancheng County, Shandong)		Jin dynasty		
Wang Lujiu 王盧九				Langya (Jiaonan, Shandong)	Lady Wang (Empress Dayi)'s father	Eastern Wu		
Wang Mai 王買					General	Cao Wei		
Wang Mao 王髦					Politician	Cao Wei		
Wang Men 王門					General	Yuan Shao	Gongsun Zan	
Wang Mi 王秘					General	Cao Wei		
Wang Mi 王秘				Wuwei County (Minqin County, Gansu)	General	Cao Wei		
Wang Mingshan 王明山				Qi County, Taiyuan (Qi County, Shanxi)	Calligrapher, politician	Cao Wei		
Wang Mo 王默	Chujing 處靜			Jinyang County, Taiyuan (Taiyuan, Shanxi)		Cao Wei		
Wang Mo 王摩					General	Cao Wei	Yuan Shao	
Wang Mo 王模				Le'anguo (Zibo, Gaoqing County, Shandong)	Politician	Cao Cao		
Wang Mou 王謀	Yuantai 元泰			Shu County, Hanjia (Mingshan County, Sichuan)	Politician	Shu Han	Liu Zhang	
Wang Ping 王平	Zijun 子均		248	Dangqu, Baxi (Qu County, Sichuan)	General	Shu Han	Cao Cao	Sanguozhi vol. 43.
Wang Pou 王裒	Weiyuan 偉元		311	Yingling, Beihai (Southeast of Changle County, Shandong)	Scholar			
Wang Pu 王誧					Politician	Han dynasty		
Wang Pu 王普					Politician	Shu Han		
Wang Qi 王頎	Kongshuo 孔碩			Donglai (Yantai, Shandong)	General	Cao Wei		
Wang Qi 王頎			192		General	Han dynasty		
Wang Qi 王起				Yangzhou (Ma'anshan, He County, Anhui)	General	Cao Wei		
Wang Qi 王岐				Kuaiji, Yuyao (Yuyao, Zhejiang)		Eastern Wu		
Wang Qian 王謙				Gaoping, Shanyang (Zoucheng, Shandong)	Politician	Han dynasty		
Wang Qian 王虔	Gongzu 恭祖			Donghai County, Tan (Linyi, Tancheng County, Shandong)	General, politician	Jin dynasty		
Wang Qian 王潛					Advisor	Eastern Wu		
Wang Qian 王遷				Hanyang County (Tianshui, Gansu)	Politician	Cao Wei		
Wang Qiao 王喬				Qucheng, Donglai (Zhaoyuan City, Shandong)	Politician	Cao Wei		
Wang Qin 王欽					Politician	Cao Wei		
Wang Rong 王戎	Junchong 濬沖	234	305	Linyi, Langya (North of Linyi, Shandong)	Politician	Jin dynasty		Jin Shu vol. 43.
Wang Rou 王柔	Shuyou 叔優			Jinyang County, Taiyuan (Taiyuan, Shanxi)	General	Han dynasty		
Wang Rui 王叡	Tongyao 通耀				Politician	Han dynasty		
Wang Si 王思				Jiyin (Dingtao County, Shandong)	Politician	Cao Wei		
Wang Shan 王山				Nanyang County (Nanyang, Henan)	Politician	Shu Han		
Wang Shang 王商	Wenbiao 文表		211	Guanghan County (Guanghan, Sichuan)	Politician	Liu Zhang	Liu Yan	Huayang Guo Zhi vol. 11. 07.
Wang Shen 王沈	Chudao 處道		266	Jinyang County, Taiyuan (Taiyuan, Shanxi)	General, politician	Jin dynasty	Cao Wei	
Wang Shen 王深	Daochong 道冲			Jinyang County, Taiyuan (Taiyuan, Shanxi)	General	Jin dynasty		
Wang Sheng 王生					General	Cao Wei		
Wang Shi 王士	Yiqiang 義疆		225	Guanghan County, Qi (Zhongjiang County, Sichuan)	General	Shu Han		
Wang Shi 王始				Longxi County, Xiangwu (Longxi County, Gansu)	Politician	Cao Wei		
Wang Shuang 王雙	Ziquan 子全		228		General	Cao Wei		
Wang Shuang 王雙					General	Cao Wei		
Wang Si 王嗣	Chengzong 承宗			Jianwei County, Zizhong (Ziyang, Sichuan)	General	Shu Han		
Wang Song 王松				Yuyang County (Miyun County, Beijing)	Warlord	Cao Wei	Wang Song	
Wang Su 王肅	Ziyong 子雍	195	256	Tan County, Donghai (Tancheng County, Shandong)	Politician	Cao Wei		Sanguozhi vol. 13.
Wang Su 王素				Yizhou (Chengdu, Sichuan)	General	Jin dynasty	Shu Han, Cao Wei	
Wang Sui 王遂						Eastern Wu		
Wang Tong 王同						Han dynasty		
Wang Tong 王同					General	Wuhuan	Cao Wei	
Wang Tu 王圖					General	Cao Cao		
Wang Wei 王威					General	Liu Biao		
Wang Wei 王偉					Politician	Han dynasty		
Wang Yong 王翁						Cao Cao		
Wang Xi 王熙	Shuhe 叔和	210	258	Gaoping, Shanyang (Zoucheng, Shandong)	Physician	Jin dynasty		
Wang Xian 王咸					General	Han dynasty		
Wang Xian 王羡					General	Cao Wei		
Wang Xiang 王祥	Xiuzheng 休徵	185	269	Langya (Jiaonan, Shandong)	Politician	Jin dynasty	Cao Wei	Jin Shu vol. 33.
Wang Xiang 王詳				Tan County, Donghai (Tancheng County, Shandong)		Cao Wei		
Wang Xiang 王象	Xibo 羲伯			Henai County (Jiaozuo, Wuzhi County, Henan)	Politician	Cao Wei		
Wang Xiong 王雄	Yuanbo 元伯			Linyi (Linyi, Shandong)	Politician	Cao Wei		
Wang Xiu 王修	Shuzhi 叔治			Yingling, Beihai (Southeast of Changle County, Shandong)	Advisor, politician	Cao Cao	Kong Rong, Yuan Tan	Sanguozhi vol. 11.
Wang Xiu 王休					General	Cao Wei		
Wang Xiu 王休				Xiangyang (Xiangyang, Hubei)	Politician	Han dynasty		
Wang Xuan 王選					Politician	Cao Wei		
Wang Xun 王訓				Dangqu, Baxi (Qu County, Sichuan)	Politician	Shu Han		
Wang Xun 王恂	Liangfu 良夫		278	Donghai County, Tan (Linyi, Tancheng County, Shandong)	General, politician	Jin dynasty	Cao Wei	
Wang Yan 王琰					General	Cao Cao		Captured Gao Gan
Wang Yan 王延					General	Cao Wei		
Wang Yan 王延						Eastern Wu		
Wang Yang 王羕					General	Cao Wei		
Wang Ye 王業				Wuling (Changde, Hunan)	Politician	Jin dynasty	Cao Wei	
Wang Ye 王業	Changxu 長緒				Politician	Cao Wei		
Wang Yi 王異					Zhao Ang's wife	Han dynasty		
Wang Yi 王乂				Linyi (Linyi, Shandong)	General	Jin dynasty		
Wang Yi 王邑					Politician	Han dynasty		
Wang Yi 王儀	Zhubiao 朱表		252	Yingling, Beihai (Southeast of Changle County, Shandong)	General	Cao Wei		
Wang Yi 王廙				Qucheng, Donglai (Zhaoyuan City, Shandong)	Politician	Jin dynasty		
Wang Ying 王營				Donglai County, Dongmou (Yantai, Shandong)	Rebel leader			
Wang You 王祐				Guanghan County, Qi (Zhongjiang County, Sichuan)	Politician	Shu Han		
Wang Yu 王彧						Cao Wei		
Wang Yu 王彧					General	Han dynasty		
Wang Yuanji 王元姬		217	268	Tan County, Donghai (Tancheng County, Shandong)	Empress dowager	Jin dynasty	Cao Wei	
Wang Yue 王越					General	Han dynasty		
Wang Yue 王約					General	Eastern Wu	Jin dynasty	
Wang Yun 王允	Zishi 子師	137	192	Qi County, Taiyuan (Qi County, Shanxi)	Politician	Han dynasty		Houhanshu vol. 66.
Wang Yun 王惲				Tan County, Donghai (Tancheng County, Shandong)	Politician	Cao Wei		
Wang Yun 王贇			238		General	Cao Wei		
Wang Zan 王贊					Politician	Gongsun Yuan		
Wang Ze 王則					General	Han dynasty		
Wang Ze 王澤	Jidao 季道			Jinyang County, Taiyuan (Taiyuan, Shanxi)	Politician	Cao Wei		
Wang Zhao 王照				Fengyi (Dali County, Shaanxi)	Rebel leader, politician	Cao Wei		
Wang Zhu 王著			279	Lujiang (Southwest of Lujiang County, Anhui)	Politician	Eastern Wu		
Wang Zhen 王振	Zhongyuan 仲遠	201		Guanghan County (Guanghan, Sichuan)	General	Jin dynasty	Shu Han	Huayang Guo Zhi vol. 11. 07.
Wang Zheng 王政					General	Zhang Chun	Han dynasty	
Wang Zhi 王直			223		General	Sun Quan		
Wang Zhi 王稚					General	Eastern Wu	Cao Wei	
Wang Zhong 王忠				Fufeng (Xingping, Shaanxi)	General	Cao Cao		
Wang Zhong 王忠				Yingling, Beihai (Southeast of Changle County, Shandong)	Politician	Cao Wei		
Wang Zifa 王子法					General	Kong Rong		
Wang Zifu 王子服	Ziyou 子由		200		General	Han dynasty		
Wang Zu 王族					Rebel leader, general	Guo Ma	Eastern Wu	
Wang Zuo 王祚					General	Cao Wei		
Wei Dan 韋誕	Zhongjiang 仲將	179	251	Duling, Jingzhao (Xi'an, Shaanxi)	Calligrapher, politician	Cao Wei		
Wei Duan 韋端	Xiufu 休甫			Duling, Jingzhao (Xi'an, Shaanxi)	Politician	Han dynasty		
Wei Dun 尾敦						Liu Yu		
Wei Feng 魏諷	Zijing 子京		219	Jiyin (Dingtao County, Shandong)	Politician	Han dynasty		
Wei Gu 衛固	Zhongjian 仲堅		206	Hedong County (Xia County, Shanxi)	Rebel leader, politician	Gao Gan		
Wei Guan 衛瓘	Boyu 伯玉	220	291	Anyi, Hedong (North of Xia County, Shanxi)	General, politician	Jin dynasty	Cao Wei	Jin Shu vol. 36.
Wei Heng 衛恒	Jushan 巨山		291	Anyi, Hedong (North of Xia County, Shanxi)	Calligrapher, politician	Jin dynasty		
Wei Huang 韋晃			218			Han dynasty		
Wei Ji 衛覬	Boru 伯儒		229	Anyi, Hedong (North of Xia County, Shanxi)	Calligrapher, politician, scholar	Cao Wei		Sanguozhi vol. 21.
Wei Ji 衛繼	Ziye 子業		264	Shu County, Yandao (Yingjing County, Sichuan)	General, politician	Shu Han		
Wei Jing 衛旌	Ziqi 子旗			Guangling County (Yangzhou, Jiangsu)	Politician	Eastern Wu		
Wei Jing 衛京				Xiangyi, Chenliu (Sui County, Henan)	Politician	Cao Wei		
Wei Kai 衛開			219		Rebel leader, general	Cao Cao		
Wei Kai 衛楷				Xiangyi, Chenliu (Sui County, Henan)	Politician	Cao Wei		
Wei Kang 韋康	Yuanjiang 元將		213	Duling, Jingzhao (Xi'an, Shaanxi)	General, politician	Cao Cao		
Wei Lang 魏狼				Yuexi County (Xichang, Sichuan)	Tribal leader	Zhuoma		
Wei Lie 衛烈				Xiangyi, Chenliu (Sui County, Henan)	Politician	Cao Wei		
Wei Long 韋隆				Fengyi, Yunyang (Chunhua County, Shaanxi)	Scholar	Eastern Wu		
Wei Mi 衛彌					General	Han dynasty		
Wei Miao 魏邈					General	Eastern Wu		
Wei Ping 魏平					General	Cao Cao		
Wei Qian 魏遷				Kuaiji, Shangyu (Shangyu, Zhejiang)		Eastern Wu		
Wei Shen 衛慎					Politician	Cao Wei		
Wei Shu 魏舒	Yangyuan 陽元	209	290	Rencheng, Guofan (Yanzhou, Shandong)	Advisor, politician	Jin dynasty	Cao Wei	Jin Shu vol. 41.
Wei Teng 魏滕	Zhoulin 周林			Kuaiji County, Shangyu (Shangyu, Zhejiang)	Politician	Eastern Wu		
Wei Wen 衛溫			231		General	Eastern Wu		
Wei Wenjing 衛文經						Shu Han		
Wei Xi 隗禧	Ziya 子牙			Jingzhaoyin (Xi'an, Shaanxi)	Scholar, politician, astronomer	Cao Wei		
Wei Xu 魏續					General	Cao Cao	Lü Bu	
Wei Xun 衛恂				Chenliu (Kaifeng, Henan)	Politician	Cao Wei		
Wei Yan 魏延	Wenchang 文長		234	Yiyang (Xinyang, Henan)	General	Shu Han		Sanguozhi vol. 40.
Wei Yan 衛演					Politician	Gongsun Yuan		
Wei You 魏攸			193	Right Beiping (Pingquan County, Hebei)	Advisor, politician	Liu Yu		
Wei Yue 魏越					General	Lü Bu		
Wei Zhao 韋昭/韋曜	Hongsi 弘嗣	204	273	Yunyang, Wu (Danyang City, Jiangsu)	Historian, politician, scholar	Eastern Wu		Sanguozhi vol. 65.
Wei Zhen 衛臻	Gongzhen 公振			Xiangyi, Chenliu (Sui County, Henan)	Politician	Cao Wei		Sanguozhi vol. 22.
Wei Zhong 魏種					General	Cao Cao	Yuan Shao	
Wei Zhongdao 衛仲道					Cai Yan(Wenji)'s husband			
Wei Zi 衛兹	Zixu 子許		190	Chenliu County, Xiangyi (Sui County, Henan)	General	Cao Cao	Zhang Miao	Sanguozhi vol. 1 & 7.
Weigong 位宮/憂位居		209	248	Xuantu County, Gaojuli (Tonghua, Jilin)	Tribal leader	Goguryeo		
Weiju 位居/簡位居			238	Fuyuguo (North of Yan Mountains, Inner Mongolia)	Tribal leader	Buyeo		
Wen Bu 文布					General	Shu Han		
Wen Chou 文醜			200		General	Yuan Shao		
Wen Chu 文俶		238	291	Qiao County, Pei (Bozhou, Anhui)	General	Jin dynasty	Cao Wei, Eastern Wu	
Wen Dai 文岱				Wan, Nanyang (Nanyang, Henan)	Politician	Cao Wei		
Wen Gong 文恭	Zhongbao 仲寶				Politician	Shu Han		
Wen Hou 文厚				Wan, Nanyang (Nanyang, Henan)	Politician	Cao Wei		
Wen Hu 文虎			291	Qiao County, Pei (Bozhou, Anhui)	General	Cao Wei	Eastern Wu	
Wen Hui 溫恢	Manji 曼基	178	223	Qi County, Taiyuan (Qi County, Shanxi)	Politician	Cao Wei		Sanguozhi vol. 15.
Wen Ji 文稷				Qiao County, Pei (Bozhou, Anhui)	General	Cao Cao		
Wen Li 文立	Guangxiu 廣休		279	Ba County (Chongqing)	Politician	Jin dynasty	Shu Han	Huayang Guo Zhi vol. 11. 02.
Wen Pin / Wen Ping 文聘	Zhongye 仲業			Wan, Nanyang (Nanyang, Henan)	General	Cao Wei	Liu Biao, Liu Cong	Sanguozhi vol. 18. Wen Ping in novel.
Wen Qin 文欽	Zhongruo 仲若		257	Qiao County, Pei (Bozhou, Anhui)	General	Eastern Wu	Cao Wei	
Wen Sheng 溫生				Qi County, Taiyuan (Qi County, Shanxi)	Politician	Cao Wei		
Wen Shu 溫恕				Taiyuan County, Qi (Qi County, Shanxi)	Politician	Han dynasty		
Wen Wu 文武				Wan, Nanyang (Nanyang, Henan)	Politician	Cao Wei		
Wen Xiu 文休				Wan, Nanyang (Nanyang, Henan)	Politician	Cao Wei		
Wen Yang 文鴦		238	291	Qiao County, Pei (Bozhou, Anhui)	General	Jin dynasty	Eastern Wu, Cao Wei	
Wen Yi 溫毅					Politician	Han dynasty		
Wen Yong 文雍			Nanyang (Nanyang, Henan)	Noble Family	Eastern Wu			
Wen Ze 文則					General	Gongsun Zan		
Wenren Min 聞人敏				Wu County (Suzhou, Jiangsu)				
Empress Wu 吳皇后			245	Chenliu (Kaifeng, Henan)	Empress	Shu Han		Sanguozhi vol. 34.
Lady Wu 吳氏			202	Wu County, Wu (Suzhou, Jiangsu)	Noble lady	Sun Quan		Sanguozhi vol. 50.
Wu An 吳安			250	Wu County, Wu (Suzhou, Jiangsu)	Politician	Eastern Wu		
Wu Ba 吳霸					Rebel leader, general	Cao Cao	Yellow Turban rebels	
Wu Ban 吳班	Yuanxiong 元雄			Chenliu (Kaifeng, Henan)	General	Shu Han		
Wu Chao 伍朝	Shiming 世明			Wuling County, Hanshou (Changde, Hunan)	Scholar			
Wu Da 吳達					Politician	Cao Wei		
Wu Dang 吳碭					General	Liu Bei	Han dynasty, Sun Quan	
Wu Dun 吳敦		166	209	Taishan (Tai'an, Shandong)	General	Cao Cao	Zang Ba, Lü Bu	
Wu Can 吾粲	Kongxiu 孔休		245	Wucheng, Wu	General, politician	Eastern Wu		Sanguozhi vol. 57.
Wu Fan 吳範	Wenze 文則		226	Shangyu, Kuaiji (Shangyu, Zhejiang)	Fortune teller, politician	Sun Quan		Sanguozhi vol. 63.
Wu Fen 吳奮				Wu County, Wu (Suzhou, Jiangsu)	General	Eastern Wu		
Wu Fu 伍孚	Deyu 德瑜		191	Runan County, Wufang (Suiping County, Henan)	General	Han dynasty		
Wu Gai 武陔	Yuanxia 元夏			Zhuyi, Peiguo (Su County, Anhui)	Politician	Jin dynasty	Cao Wei	Jin Shu vol. 45.
Wu Gang 吳綱				Pengcheng (Xuzhou, Jiangsu)	Politician	Cao Wei		
Wu Guan 吳瓘				Chenguo (Huaiyang County, Henan)	Politician	Cao Wei		
Wu Huan 吳桓					Rebel leader	Yellow Turban rebels		
Wu Jing 吳景			203	Wu County, Wu (Suzhou, Jiangsu)	General	Sun Ce	Sun Jian, Yuan Shu	Sanguozhi vol. 50.
Wu Ju 吳巨				Changsha	General	Liu Biao		
Wu Ju 吳遽				Yuzhang County, Poyang (Poyang County, Jiangxi)	Rebel leader, general	Eastern Wu		
Wu Kang 吳康	Zizhong 子仲			Jiyin (Dingtao County, Shandong)	Politician	Jin dynasty		
Wu Kuang 吳匡				Chenliu (Kaifeng, Henan)	General	Han dynasty		
Wu Lan 吳蘭			218		General	Liu Bei	Liu Zhang	
Wu Liang 五梁	Deshan 德山			Jianwei County, Nan'an (Leshan, Sichuan)	General, politician	Shu Han		
Wu Lin 吳林					Politician	Cao Wei		
Wu Long 伍隆				Kuaiji, Yuyao (Yuyao, Zhejiang)	Bandit leader	Han dynasty		
Wu Lu 五鹿					Bandit	Black Mountain bandits		
Wu Mao 武茂	Jixia 季夏		291	Zhuyi, Peiguo (Su County, Anhui)	Politician	Jin dynasty		
Wu Mian 吳免					Rebel leader, general	Eastern Wu		
Wu Ping 吳平					Politician	Eastern Wu		
Wu Pu 吳普				Guangling County (Yangzhou, Jiangsu)	Physician			
Wu Qi 吳祺				Wu County, Wu (Suzhou, Jiangsu)	Politician	Eastern Wu		
Wu Qiong 伍瓊	Deyu 德瑜		190	Runan (Runan, Henan)	General	Han dynasty		
Wu Rang 吳穰					Politician	Eastern Wu		
Wu Shao 武韶	Shuxia 叔夏			Zhuyi, Peiguo (Su County, Anhui)	Politician	Jin dynasty		
Wu Shu 吳述					Rebel leader, general	Guo Ma	Eastern Wu	
Wu Shuo 吳碩			200		Politician	Han dynasty		Wu Shi in novel
Wu Shuo 吳碩				Guangling County (Yangzhou, Jiangsu)	General	Eastern Wu		
Wu Shuo 吳碩				Guangling (Yangzhou, Jiangsu)	General	Eastern Wu		
Wu Wu 吳五					Rebel leader, general	Eastern Wu		
Wu Xi 五習/伍習					General	Cao Cao	Dong Zhuo, Li Jue	
Wu Xiu 吳脩			190		General	Dong Zhuo	Han dynasty	
Wu Yan 吾彥	Shize 士則			Wu County, Wu (Suzhou, Jiangsu)	General	Jin dynasty	Eastern Wu	Jin Shu vol. 27.
Wu Yan 伍延			280		General	Eastern Wu		
Wu Yan 烏延				Youbeiping (Fengrun town, Tangshan, Hebei)	Tribal leader	Wuhuan		
Wu Yi 吳懿	Ziyuan 子遠		237	Chenliu (Kaifeng, Henan)	General	Shu Han	Liu Zhang	
Wu Ying 吳應	Wenshu 溫舒			Jiyin (Dingtao County, Shandong)	Politician	Jin dynasty	Cao Wei	
Wu Zhi 吳質	Jizhong 季重	177	230	Jiyin (Dingtao County, Shandong)	Advisor, general, politician	Cao Wei		
Wu Zhou 武周	Bonan 伯南			Zhuyi, Peiguo (Su County, Anhui)	General, politician	Cao Wei		
Wu Zi 吳資					Politician	Lü Bu	Han dynasty	
Wu Zilan 吳子蘭			200		General	Han dynasty		
Wu Ziqing 吳子卿						Han dynasty		
Wu Zuan 吳纂			256	Wu County, Wu (Suzhou, Jiangsu)	Politician	Eastern Wu		
Lady of Wuyang 舞陽君					Empress dowager	Han dynasty		
