= Shou Liang =

3rd century Shu Han official and scholar

- 壽良

Grand Prolonger of Autumn (大長秋)
- In office ?–?
- Monarch: ?

Inspector of Liang Province (梁州刺史)
- In office ?–?
- Monarch: Sima Yan

Administrator of Xingping (始平太守)
- In office ?–?
- Monarch: Sima Yan

Registrar (主簿)
- In office 264 – ?
- Monarch: Cao Huan

Gentleman at the Yellow Gates (黃門侍郎)
- In office ? – 263
- Monarch: Liu Shan

Personal details
- Born: Unknown; Chengdu, Sichuan
- Died: Unknown; Luoyang, Henan
- Resting place: Mount Mangdang, Henan
- Occupation: Official, scholar
- Courtesy name: Wenshu (文淑)

Shou Liang (fl. 250s–280s), courtesy name Wenshu, was an official and scholar of the state of Shu Han in the Three Kingdoms period of China. After the fall of Shu in 263, he continued serving under the Cao Wei state, then the succeeding Jin dynasty in 266.

== Life ==
Shou Liang was born in Chengdu, Shu Commandery (蜀郡), which is present-day Chengdu, Sichuan. His father and grandfather served as Administrator of Qianwei (犍為太守). In his youth, Shou Liang was well known alongside Zhang Wei (張微) and Fei Ji (費緝) with both of them born in Wuyang, Qianwei Commandery (犍為郡), which is present-day Pengshan County, Sichuan. Shou Liang specialized in the study of the Spring and Autumn Annals and had a complete understanding of Five Classics. Furthermore, he was a man of righteousness and integrity. He served as a junior official, a Cavalier Attendant (散騎) then Gentleman at the Yellow Gates (黃門侍郎) in the State of Shu Han.

After the Conquest of Shu by Wei, he was appointed as a county's Registrar (主簿) then as Official in Charge of Historical Records (上計吏). Although, he was nominated as xiaolian (civil service candidate), he refused the appointment. Thereafter, he was reallocated as Registrar (主簿) of the Yi province, as Attendant Clerk (治中) then as Bieja (別駕; important assistant to the governor of the province) where he was recognized for his talent and good behavior.

Huang Fuyan (皇甫晏), the Inspector of Yi Province (益州刺史) recommended him to serve at the Three Departments as a Dazai (太宰; high ranking official). Following this, he was appointed as Prefect of Bacheng (霸城令) and Administrator of Xingping (始平太守) where his governance was highly praised. He was reallocated as Inner Clerk (內史) of Fufeng (扶風) and Qin state (秦國).

In 279, after the death of Wen Li, the Prefect of Wen County (溫縣令), Li Mi sent a memorial to the emperor, which stated "The officials and scholars of Liang and Yi provinces are few, those with talent not yet blooming and others living to look after their personal comfort. Shou Liang should be given this opportunity to join the imperial court; he is the hope of the two provinces, and fitting to meet the expectation of this promotion while carrying on Wen Li's legacy."

Therefore, Emperor Wu employed Shou as Gentleman at the Yellow Gates (黃門侍郎), simultaneously appointed as jishìzhong (給事中; "Serving within the Palace") and Inspector of Liang Province (梁州刺史). Later, he was relocated to the imperial court to serve as Cavalier Gentleman-in-Attendance (散騎侍郎). He died while serving as Grand Prolonger of Autumn (大長秋; "Empress chamberlain"). He was buried in the Mangshan (芒山) Mountains in Luobei (洛北).

== Appraisal and anecdote ==
Chang Qu, who wrote Shou Liang's biography in the Chronicles of Huayang (Huayang Guo Zhi), (Note: Shou Liang's biography is recorded in the eleventh volume of the Huayang Guo Zhi, titled Biographies of later worthies (後賢志), covering the life of notable persons from the Sichuan region who lived during the Jin dynasty.) appraised Shou Liang as follows: "Loyal and sincere, clearly wise and devoted to honesty." Shou Liang was among the descendants of former Shu officials recommended by Luo Xian to Sima Yan to be employed. At the time, each of them were renowned.

According to the Jin Shu, Chen Shou collected and compiled the writings of Zhuge Liang during his early career under the Jin dynasty. The compiled text was called Shu Xiang Zhuge Liang Ji (蜀相諸葛亮集; Collection of the Shu Chancellor Zhuge Liang). The Huayang Guozhi mentioned that later on, Zhang Hua proposed to Emperor Wu to have the text reorganized and composed as a 24-volumes. At the time, Shou Liang was also doing his own research on Zhuge Liang's works, with his outcome quite different from Chen Shou's original version. In the end, the text was rewritten, and became the Zhuge Liang Gushi (諸葛亮故事; Stories of Zhuge Liang).

== Zhang Wei ==
Zhang Wei (張微), whose courtesy name, was Jianxing (建興), was the son of Zhang Yi. He was earnest in his studies with good knowledge. He served as the Administrator (太守) of Guanghan (廣漢; around present-day Guanghan, Sichuan) during the Jin dynasty.

== Fei Ji ==
Fei Ji (費緝), whose courtesy name, was Wenping (文平), was known for his integrity and conscientiousness in his duties. He was recommended as a xiucai (秀才; person who passed the county level imperial exam). Then appointed as Prefect of Licheng (歷城令), Administrator of Fuling (涪陵太守) and transferred as Inner Clerk (內史) of Qiao State (譙国).

== See also ==
- Lists of people of the Three Kingdoms
