= Luo Xian =

Chinese Jin dynasty general (died 270)

- 羅憲 / 羅獻 (Note: The fifth-century historian Pei Songzhi noted that Luo Xian's given name Xian was written as 獻 instead of 憲 in some historical records. He did not know why there was such a discrepancy.)

Champion General (冠軍將軍)
- In office 267 – 270
- Monarch: Emperor Wu of Jin

Administrator of Wuling (武陵太守) (nominal)
- In office 264 – 267
- Monarchs: Cao Huan / Emperor Wu of Jin

General Who Rises Above the River (淩江將軍)
- In office 264 – 267
- Monarch: Cao Huan

Army Commandant (領軍)
- In office 258 – ?
- Monarch: Liu Shan / Cao Huan

Administrator of Badong (巴東太守)
- In office 258 – ?
- Monarch: Liu Shan

Colonel (校尉)
- In office ? – 258
- Monarch: Liu Shan

Personal details
- Born: Unknown Xiangyang, Hubei
- Died: 270 (Note: According to Luo Xian's biography, he was older than 12 in 238. Thus, his birth year should be before 226.)
- Relations: Luo Shi (brother); Luo Shang (nephew)
- Children: Luo Xi
- Parent: Luo Meng (father)
- Occupation: Military general, politician
- Courtesy name: Lingze (令則)
- Posthumous name: Marquis Lie (烈侯)
- Peerage: Marquis of Xi'e County (西鄂縣侯)

Luo Xian (died 270), courtesy name Lingze, was a Chinese military general and politician of Shu Han in the Three Kingdoms period of China. After the fall of Shu in 263, he continued serving under the Cao Wei state, then the succeeding Jin dynasty in 266. He is best known for defending his position at Yong'an (present-day Fengjie County, Chongqing) for about six months against attacks from Shu's former ally state Wu after the fall of Shu.

== Historical sources ==
Despite his prominence, Luo Xian is only mentioned in the biographies of others as Chen Shou did not write a exclusive biography for him in the Records of the Three Kingdoms (Sanguozhi). Jin dynasty historian, Xi Zuochi wrote his biography in the Records of the Elders of Xiangyang (襄陽耆舊記). (Note: Biographies of people born in Xiangyang.) In the 5th century, Pei Songzhi annotated Luo Xian's biography to Huo Yi's. His later biography in volume 57 of Book of Jin (Jin Shu) is nearly identical to the one wrote earlier.

== Early life ==
Luo Xian's ancestral home (and birthplace) was in Xiangyang in present-day Xiangyang, Hubei. His father, Luo Meng (羅蒙), left Xiangyang and took shelter in Shu (蜀; present-day Sichuan and Chongqing) during the chaos towards the end of the Eastern Han dynasty. Luo Meng later served as the Administrator of Guanghan Commandery in the state of Shu during the Three Kingdoms period.

At a young age, Luo Xian was known for being talented in scholarly arts. He could already write essays when he was just 12 years old. He also studied under the tutelage of Qiao Zhou and his fellow students compared him to Zigong, protege of Confucius. When Liu Xuan was designated as the Crown Prince of Shu in 238, Luo Xian was appointed as a taizi sheren (太子舍人; an attendant to the crown prince). And was later reassigned to serve in the personnel department of the imperial secretariat. Some time later, he was commissioned as a Colonel (校尉) and sent on a diplomatic mission to Shu's ally state Wu. He received high praise from the Wu officials.

== Fall of Shu ==
When the eunuch Huang Hao rose to power in the Shu government around the 250s, many officials fawned on him in the hope of receiving favours from him. Luo Xian was one of the officials who refused to have any dealings with Huang Hao. As a result, Huang Hao resented him and found an excuse to send him out of Chengdu, the Shu capital. In 258, to serve as the Administrator of Badong Commandery (巴東郡; around present-day Fengjie County, Chongqing) near the border between Shu and its ally state Wu. At the time, the Shu Han general Yan Yu (閻宇) was Area Commander of Badong (巴東都督). Since Yan Yu respected Luo Xian, he reassigned him to be an Army Commandant (領軍) and second him as his deputy.

Between September and November 263, when Shu's rival state Wei launched a large-scale invasion of Shu, Yan Yu received orders to lead troops from Badong Commandery to defend Shu from the Wei invaders. Luo Xian remained behind in Yong'an (永安; present-day Fengjie County, Chongqing) with only 2,000 troops.

When news of the fall of Chengdu reached Yong'an, there was much unrest and panic among the people. Some of the officials at Yong'an even abandoned their posts and fled. Luo Xian managed to restore order and stability in Yong'an after executing one of the men who spread the news that Chengdu had fallen. After receiving news of Liu Shan's surrender, Luo Xian gathered all his troops and mourned the end of Shu for three days.

== Defence of Yong'an ==
In the meantime, when Shu's ally state Wu learnt that Shu had fallen to Wei, they prepared to invade and capture Badong Commandery under the pretext of sending reinforcements to Shu. Upon receiving news of the impending Wu invasion, Luo Xian told his men: "Our dynasty has collapsed. Wu was supposed to be our ally but now, instead of helping us, they break our alliance and seek to seize our territories. As Shu has fallen, Wu won't last long too. Who would want to surrender to Wu?" He then rallied his troops, reminded them of their allegiance to Shu, and strengthened their defences.

In March 264, the Wei general Zhong Hui, who took charge of Chengdu following Liu Shan's surrender, started a rebellion against the Wei regent Sima Zhao. However, the rebellion failed and Zhong Hui was killed by his officers who refused to join him. Upon learning of Zhong Hui's death, the Wu emperor Sun Xiu thought that no one was in charge of Shu, so he sent his troops to seize control of the Shu territories. However, the Wu forces led by Bu Xie encountered strong resistance from Luo Xian and his men at Badong Commandery and could not advance further west into the heartland of Shu.

As the Wu forces rained arrows on Luo Xian's position along the Yangtze, Luo Xian feared that he might not be able to hold out for long so he ordered his subordinate Yang Zong (楊宗) to break out of the siege and head north to seek help from the Wei general Chen Qian. He also surrendered his tallies and sent his son as a hostage to the Wei regent Sima Zhao to prove his sincerity in seeking help from Wei to counter the Wu invasion. When the Wu forces under Bu Xie's command attacked Yong'an, Luo Xian led his men out of the city to strike back and greatly defeated the enemy's army.

Enraged at the Wu defeat, the Wu emperor Sun Xiu ordered his general Lu Kang to lead an additional 30,000 troops to reinforce Bu Xie and besiege Yong'an. During the following six months, the city was under constant attack by the Wu forces. However there was no sign of Wei reinforcements arriving and more than half of Yong'an's population had fallen sick.

When someone suggested that he break out of the siege and head south towards Zangke Commandery (牂柯郡; covering parts of present-day Guizhou) or head north to Shangyong Commandery (上庸郡; covering parts of present-day northwestern Hubei), Luo Xian replied: "If you are a leader of people, the masses will look up to you. A junzi will try to restore stability in a crisis and not flee in the face of danger. I am prepared to end my life here."

After Chen Qian relayed Luo Xian's call for help to Sima Zhao, the Wei regent ordered the general Hu Lie to lead troops from Jing Province to help Luo Xian and lift the siege on Yong'an. The Wu forces retreated after seeing that Wei reinforcements had arrived.

== Service under the Cao Wei and Jin dynasty ==
The Wei regent Sima Zhao accepted Luo Xian's surrender and ordered him to remain there and continue guarding Yong'an (永安; present-day Fengjie County, Chongqing). He also appointed Luo Xian as General Who Rises Above the River (淩江將軍), and awarded him the peerage of the Marquis of Wannian Village (萬年亭侯). When four counties in Wuling Commandery (武陵郡; around present-day Changde, Hunan) rebelled against Wu rule, the Wei government appointed Luo Xian as the nominal Administrator of Wuling (武陵太守) and Army Supervisor of Badong (巴東監軍).

In February 266, (Note: The first year of the Taishi era ends on 21 Feb 266 in the Julian calendar; Sima Yan crowned himself on 8 Feb (bingyin day of the 12th month).) after Sima Zhao's son Sima Yan (Emperor Wu) usurped the Wei throne and established the Jin dynasty to replace Wei, he promoted Luo Xian from the status of a village marquis to a county marquis under the title "Marquis of Xi'e County" (西鄂縣侯). The emperor also issued an imperial decree as follows: "(Luo) Xian is loyal, courageous, decisive and resolute. He is talented and capable. He should have a ceremonial guard to accompany him." He also awarded Luo Xian a ceremonial sword made of shanxuan jade. After Luo Xian's family moved to Luoyang, the Jin imperial capital, Emperor Wu appointed Luo Xian's son Luo Xi (羅襲) as an Official Who Concurrently Serves in the Palace (給事中).

In the winter of 267, Emperor Wu summoned Luo Xian to his imperial court in Luoyang, appointed him as Champion General (冠軍將軍) and granted him acting imperial authority.

In April 268, when Luo Xian attended a banquet hosted by Emperor Wu in Hualin Gardens, the emperor asked him to recommend some talents from among the descendants of former Shu officials. Luo Xian then recommended Chang Ji, Du Zhen, Shou Liang, Chen Shou, Gao Gui (高軌), Lü Ya, Xu Guo (許國), Fei Gong, Zhuge Jing and Chen Yu. Emperor Wu recruited all of them to serve in the Jin government; these men all put their talents to good use.

After Luo Xian returned to his post at Yong'an, he led his troops to attack and occupy Wu County (巫縣; present-day Wushan County, Chongqing), which was under the control of Eastern Wu. He then presented a plan to Emperor Wu for the Jin dynasty to conquer Eastern Wu.

Throughout his life, Luo Xian was known for holding himself to high moral standards and being respectful towards scholar-officials. Although he did not own any private property or enterprises, he was generous with his wealth and did not hesitate to use it to help the poor. He died in 270 and was awarded the posthumous appointment of General Who Stabilises the South (安南將軍) and the posthumous title "Marquis Lie" (烈侯; literally "vehement marquis").

== Family ==
Luo Xian's elder brother Luo Shi (羅式) was Administrator of Zangke.

Luo Xian's son, Luo Xi (羅襲), served as General Who Rises Above the River (淩江將軍) and inherited command of his father's troops. He died early, however, and was awarded the posthumous appointment of Administrator of Guanghan Commandery. Luo Xi's son, Luo Hui (羅徽), served as a clerk under the Prince of Shunyang (順陽王) and was killed by the rebel leader Wang Ru in 311.

Luo Xian's nephew, Luo Shang (羅尚), also served as a general under the Jin dynasty.

== See also ==
- Lists of people of the Three Kingdoms
