= Li Xiang (Shu Han) =

3rd century Shu Han official and scholar

- 李驤

Administrator of Guanghan (廣漢太守)
- In office ?–?
- Monarch: Sima Yan

Administrator of Jianping (建平太守)
- In office ?–?
- Monarch: Sima Yan

Masters of Writing (尚書郎)
- In office ?–?
- Monarch: Sima Yan

Personal details
- Born: Unknown; Mianyang, Sichuan
- Died: Unknown
- Parent: Li Fu (father)
- Occupation: Politicians
- Courtesy name: Shulong (叔龍)
- Nickname: "Erlang of Shu" (蜀有二郎)

Li Xiang (fl. 250s–270s), courtesy name Shulong, was a Chinese politician of the state of Shu Han in the Three Kingdoms period of China. After the fall of Shu in 263, he continued serving under the Cao Wei state, then the succeeding Jin dynasty in 266.

== Life ==
Li Xiang was born in Fu, Zitong Commandery (梓潼郡), which is present-day Mianyang, Sichuan. His father Li Fu serve as Supervisor of the Masters of Writing (尚書僕射). However, Li Xiang was also famous in his own right. He served as an official in the Shu Han government until his conquest then as Gentleman of the Masters of Writing (尚書郎) and Administrator of Guanghan (廣漢太守).

Following the Conquest of Shu by Wei, he travelled to the capital of Luoyang, along with Shou Liang, Li Mi, Chen Shou, Wang Chong and Du Lie. At the time, they were renowned talent of the Western lands. All of them were close friends. However, except for Wang Chong. The relation between them declined. While he served as Gentleman of the Masters of Writing (尚書郎), his reputation was similar to Du Zhen, another official from Shu. Whenever the imperial court hold a debate or discussion, there was no one who could defeat them. Hence, people started to refer to them as "Erlang of Shu" (蜀有二郎).

Around this time, Li Xiang was well known throughout his generation as a talented person with notable expertise. Previously, he was recommended as a xiucai (秀才; person who passed the county level imperial exam). He was appointed to be the Administrator of Jianping (建平太守), but he declined the appointment and claimed that he was ill because he wanted to stay in his homeland in Yi Province. Therefore, he was reassigned as the Administrator of Guanghan (廣漢太守). Li Xiang was a close friend of Chen Shou but later there was a rift in their friendship and they started to slander each other. Contemporary scholars criticized them because of this incident.

== See also ==
- Lists of people of the Three Kingdoms
