= Du Zhen =

3rd century Shu Han official and scholar

- 杜軫

Administrator of Qianwei (犍為太守)
- In office ?–?
- Monarch: Sima Yan
- Succeeded by: Du Lie

Gentleman of the Masters of Writing (尚書郎)
- In office ?–?
- Monarch: Sima Yan

Prefect of Chiyang (池陽令)
- In office ?–?
- Monarch: Sima Yan

Prefect of Jianning (建寧令)
- In office ?–?
- Monarch: ? (Note: There is a two year gap between the fall of Shu Han and the establishment of the Jin dynasty, It isn't recorded if Du Zhen served the Cao Wei state in between 264 and 266 or after Cao Huan's abdication to Jin.)

Officer of Merit (功曹)
- In office ? – 263
- Monarch: Liu Shan

Personal details
- Born: Unknown (Note: Du Zhen's biography in the Huayang Guo Zhi recorded that he died at the age of 58 (by East Asian age reckoning). Du Zhen's other biography in the Jin Shu recorded that he died at the age of 51 (by East Asian age reckoning). However, the Huayang Guo Zhi is considered more reliable since it is a near contemporary source compiled between 348 and 354 by Chang Qu, while the Jin Shu is compiled in 648, some 300 years later.) Chengdu, Sichuan
- Died: Unknown (aged 57) Pengshan County, Sichuan
- Relations: Du Lie (brother); Du Liang (brother)
- Children: Du Pi; Du Xiu
- Parent: Du Xiong (father)
- Occupation: Philosopher, politician
- Courtesy name: Chaozong (超宗)
- Nickname: "Erlang of Shu" (蜀有二郎)

Du Zhen (fl. 250s–280s), courtesy name Chaozong, was a Chinese philosopher and politician of the state of Shu Han in the Three Kingdoms period of China. After the fall of Shu in 263, he continued serving under the Jin dynasty, that succeeded Cao Wei state in 266.

== Life ==
Du Zhen was born in Chengdu, Shu Commandery (蜀郡), which is present-day Chengdu, Sichuan. His father, Du Xiong (杜雄), whose courtesy name, was Boxiong (伯雄) had served as the Prefect (令) of Han'an (漢安), Luo County (雒縣) and Mianzhu (綿竹). In his youth, Du Zhen was a student of Qiao Zhou. Du Zhen demonstrated his unique insight and made important discoveries in classic writing under the guidance of his teacher. After he completed his scholarship, he was appointed by the Shu Han's government as Officer of Merit (功曹).

In 263, when Deng Ai conquered Shu Han, Du Zhen was conscripted by the local commandery. Later, as Zhong Hui led his army to enter Chengdu, the current Administrator (太守) of Nanyang (南陽), Zhang Fujun (張府君) refused to leave his post. Seeing this, Du Zhen warned him: "Zhong Hui just recently imprisoned Deng Ai; his army and soldiers are close to us. In such turbulent times, fortune and misfortune are unpredictable. You should leave your office before trouble arrive." Zhang Fujun was convinced by this advice and left his post to go into hiding in a nearby residence. As predicted, Zhong Hui did dispatch Deng Ai's subordinate Qian Hong to take office as the new Administrator leading hundreds of armed horsemen in the commandery. When they arrived, Qian Hong inquired about the absence of the former Administrator to which Du Zhen replied that he already left knowing someone would be sent to replace him. This answer satisfied him. Impressed by Du Zhen, Qian Hong wanted to keep employing him as Officer of Merit (功曹). However, Du Zhen insisted on resigning his post.

After this, Du Zhen was nominated as a xiaolian (civil service candidate) and appointed as Prefect of Jianning (建寧令). During his tenure, Du Zhen ruled his administration by promoting virtue. He greatly improved social customs and practiced enlightenment among the ethnic tribes who were soon convinced of his sincerity and integrity. When they learned that his term office had reached his end, they all assembled to bid him goodbye bringing along with them many gifts. However, Du Zhen declined to accept even one gift leaving his office as he arrived with no personal gain. Following this, he worked successively as the Prefect (令) of Shanyang (山陽) and Xincheng (新城) where he achieved great governance. Next, he was transferred as Prefect (令) of Chiyang (池陽) enhanced it as the most prosperous county (among the eleven) of Yong Province (雍州). Under his jurisdiction, people would build shrines to pray for him. And when he pronounced sentence, none would bear a grudge against him.

Subsequently, he was promoted to the position of Gentleman of the Masters of Writing (尚書郎), where he was responsible for assisting with administration. With each new appointments, he quickly accomplish his tasks. He was also known for his imposing appearance and impressive demeanor. Thus, he was highly regarded by the imperial court. Moreover, Du Zhen had an extensive knowledge and a quick mind hence his arguments were often reused by others in memorials and refutations. At the time, his fame was on par with Li Xiang who was also from Shu and served in a similar position. Every time, there was a discussion or debate at the court no one could beat them. Therefore, contemporary scholars gave them the nickname of "Erlang of Shu" (蜀有二郎).

Thereafter, he was transferred as Administrator of Qianwei Commandery (犍為太守), where he showed great love and concern for the people. Which, additionally improved his great reputation. Furthermore, he was appointed as dazhongzheng (大中正; official responsible for identifying future talents for the government). Du Zhen was not only knowledgeable and talented but also charming and magnanime. Emperor Wu knew about him and wanted to employ him as his personal attendant. However, Du Zhen died due to illness before taking up the post, at the age of 58 (by East Asian age reckoning). or at the age of 51 (by East Asian age reckoning).

== Appraisal ==
Chang Qu, who wrote Du Zhen's biography in the Chronicles of Huayang (Huayang Guo Zhi), (Note: Du Zhen's biography is recorded in the eleventh volume of the Huayang Guo Zhi, titled Biographies of later worthies (後賢志), covering the life of notable persons from the Sichuan region who lived during the Jin dynasty.) appraised Du Zhen as follows: "Strong with a prosperous appearance, friendly and firm." Du Zhen was among the descendants of former Shu officials recommended by Luo Xian to Sima Yan to be employed. At the time, each of them were renowned.

== Du Lie ==
Du Lie (杜烈), whose courtesy name, was Zhongwu (仲武) was Du Zhen's younger brother. He was known for his integrity toward his work and keen intellect. Along with his kind composure and gentle personality, he earned a reputation that matched his elder brother's. With interest for politics, like Du Zhen, he was nominated as a xiaolian (civil service candidate) and successively served as the Prefect (令) of Pingkang (平康), Niubing (牛鞞), Nanzheng (南鄭), and Anyang (安陽). When the Jin dynasty was established, he was appointed as Prefect of the Gentlemen of the Palace (郎中令). Thereafter, he was transferred to be the Administrator of Hengyang (衡陽太守).

When he learned of the death of his elder brother. Du Lie sent a request to the imperial court to resign from his post, as he wanted to take care of his orphaned young nephews (Du Pi and Du Xiu), who were left in a difficult situation after Du Zhen's passing. Du Lie also intended to assist in the burial of his brother's remains in their ancestral tomb. Emperor Wu lamented that Du Zhen's talents had not been fully utilized but also appreciated Du Lie's piety toward his family. Therefore, he respected his wishes and had Du Lie succeeded his brother in Sichuan as Administrator of Qianwei (犍為太守), people of the province honored him. Then, he was transferred as Administrator of Xiangdong (湘東太守). After, he was reassigned to serve as Gentleman of the Palace (郎中) to Sima Ying, at the time Prince of Chengdu (成都王). He died of illness while serving in office.

== Du Liang ==
Du Liang (杜良), whose courtesy name, was Youlun (幼倫) was the youngest brother. He also had notable talents of his time. He was recommended as a xiucai (秀才; person who passed the county level imperial exam). He served as the Prefect (令) of Chaling (茶陵) and Xindu (新都). Like his brother, Du Lie. Du Liang also worked as Prefect of the Gentlemen of the Palace (郎中令). He was reassigned as Administrator (太守) of Fuling (涪陵) and Jianning (建寧). All of the three brothers flourished in their political careers, which was considered an admirable story by many people of their homeland in Yi Province.

== Du Pi ==
Du Zhen had two sons. Du Pi (杜毗), whose courtesy name, was Changji (長基) was the elder. Like his uncle Du Liang, he was recommended as a xiucai (秀才). Sima Ying assigned him to serve as a retainer. Thereafter, he was relocated to assist the army and successively served as a General's Auxiliary (掾屬), Grand Tutor (太傅) of the Army, Chief Clerk (長史) of Pingtung (屏東) and Gentleman of the Masters of Writing (尚書郎). During the period of the Disaster of Yongjia, Wang Dun recommended him to serve as Inspector of Yi Province (益州刺史). He was instructed to assist Liu Chun (柳純) the Administrator (太守) of Yidu (宜都) in the defence of Baidicheng (帝城). However, Du Tao sent soldiers to attack him and he was killed. Du Pi's second son, Du Xin (杜歆) was also recommended as a xiucai (秀才).

== Du Xiu ==
Du Xiu (杜秀), whose courtesy name, was Yanying (彥穎), was the younger. He served as a Registrar (主簿) in the imperial administration, under Luo Shang. At this time, there were great chaos and the Yi Province soon fell to Li Xiong. Li Xiong wanted to recruit him as his Major (司馬) but Du Xiu refused to serve him, therefore he was executed and died at a young age. Du Pi and Du Xiu were famous and talented, hence people at the time referred to them as the "Two Phoenixes" (二鳳).

== See also ==
- Lists of people of the Three Kingdoms
