= Li Fu =

3rd-century Chinese official of the state of Shu Han

- 李福

Supervisor of the Masters of Writing (尚書僕射)
- In office ?–?

General Who Spreads Might (揚威將軍)
- In office ?–?

Area Commander of Jiangzhou (江州督)
- In office ?–?

Administrator of Baxi (巴西太守)
- In office 223 – ?
- Monarch: Liu Shan

Prefect of Chengdu (成都令)
- In office ? – 223
- Monarch: Liu Bei

Chief of Xichongguo (西充國長)
- In office ?–?

Personal details
- Born: Unknown Mianyang, Sichuan
- Died: Unknown
- Children: Li Xiang
- Parent: Li Quan (father)
- Occupation: Politician
- Courtesy name: Sunde (孫德)
- Peerage: Marquis of Pingyang Village (平陽亭侯)

Li Fu (fl. 210s–230s), courtesy name Sunde, was a Chinese politician of the state of Shu Han during the Three Kingdoms period of China.

== Early life ==
Li Fu was born in the late Eastern Han dynasty in Fu County (涪縣), Zitong Commandery (梓潼郡), which is present-day Mianyang, Sichuan.

In 214, after the warlord Liu Bei seized control of Yi Province from Liu Yan's successor Liu Zhang, he recruited Li Fu to serve under him as a scribe (書佐). Li Fu later rose through the ranks to serve as the Chief of Xichongguo County (西充國縣; south of present-day Langzhong, Sichuan) and then as the Prefect of Chengdu (成都令).

== Career under Liu Bei ==
Following the end of the Eastern Han dynasty and the start of the Three Kingdoms period in 220, Li Fu came to serve in the state of Shu Han (or Shu), which Liu Bei established in 221 and became its founding emperor.

In 223, after Liu Bei's son Liu Shan became the new Shu emperor, he reassigned Li Fu to serve as the Administrator of Baxi Commandery (巴西郡; around present-day Langzhong, Sichuan). Li Fu later consecutively served as the Area Commander of Jiangzhou (江州督) and General Who Spreads Might (揚威將軍) before he was recalled to the Shu imperial capital Chengdu to serve as Supervisor of the Masters of Writing (尚書僕射) in the central government. He was also enfeoffed as the Marquis of Pingyang Village (平陽亭侯).

== At Zhuge Liang's deathbed ==
In 234, Zhuge Liang, the Imperial Chancellor of Shu, led Shu forces on a military campaign against Shu's rival state Wei for the fifth time since 228. This led to the Battle of Wuzhang Plains between Shu and Wei. Around September or October that year, Zhuge Liang became critically ill while both sides were locked in a stalemate at the Wuzhang Plains (near present-day Qishan County, Shaanxi).

During this time, the Shu emperor Liu Shan sent Li Fu to visit Zhuge Liang and consult him on plans for Shu's future. Li Fu did as instructed and noted down what Zhuge Liang told him before leaving. A few days later, while he was en route to Chengdu, Li Fu suddenly remembered that he forgot to ask Zhuge Liang something so he quickly headed back to the Wuzhang Plains.

Zhuge Liang told Li Fu: "I know why you came back. Although we have spoken at length over the past few days, you still have questions for me. 'Gongyan is the most suitable' is the answer to the question you are about to ask me." Li Fu thanked him and asked: "Indeed. Earlier on, I forgot to ask you, Sir, who can take charge of state affairs after you, Sir, pass on. That's why I came back. If you don't mind me asking further, who can take charge after Jiang Wan?" Zhuge Liang replied: "Wenwei can succeed him." Li Fu continued asking but Zhuge Liang did not reply. Li Fu then left and returned to Chengdu.

== Death ==
In the early Yanxi era (238–257) of Liu Shan's reign, when the Shu general Jiang Wan led the Shu army to attack Wei, he appointed Li Fu as an Army Supervisor (監軍) with the rank of Major (司馬). Li Fu died around the time.

== Appraisal ==
The Shu official Yang Xi praised Li Fu for being "decisive and astute" in his Ji Han Fuchen Zan (季漢輔臣贊; pub. 241), a collection of praises of notable persons who served in Shu. The Yi Bu Qijiu Zaji also recorded that Li Fu was "competent, perceptive, decisive, astute, and shrewd in politics".

== Family ==
Li Fu's father, Li Quan (李權), whose courtesy name was Boyu (伯豫), served as the Chief of Linqiong County (臨邛縣; present-day Qionglai, Sichuan). Around the year 190, Liu Yan, the Governor of Yi Province (covering present-day Sichuan and Chongqing), saw Li Quan and other local elites as potential threats to his control over the province, so he found excuses to have them arrested and executed.

Li Fu's son, Li Xiang, had the courtesy name Shulong (叔龍), was also famous. Li Xiang served in Shu like his father and held the positions of an imperial secretary and later the Administrator of Guanghan Commandery (廣漢郡; around present-day Guanghan, Sichuan).

== See also ==
- Lists of people of the Three Kingdoms
