= Li Mi (Shu Han) =

Shu Han official and scholar (224-287)

- 李密

Administrator of Hanzhong (漢中太守)
- In office 286
- Monarch: Sima Yan

Prefect of Wen County (溫縣令)
- In office ?–?
- Monarch: Sima Yan

Registrar (主簿)
- In office ?–?
- Monarch: Liu Shan

Gentleman of the Masters of Writing (尚書郎)
- In office ?–?
- Monarch: Liu Shan

Assistant Officer (從事)
- In office ?–?
- Monarch: Liu Shan

Personal details
- Born: 224 Pengshan County, Sichuan
- Died: 287 (aged 63)
- Relations: Li Guang (grandfather); Lady Liu (grandmother)
- Children: Li Ci; Li Xing; Li Shengshuo; three other sons
- Occupation: Official, scholar
- Courtesy name: Lingbo (令伯)

Li Mi (224–287), courtesy name Lingbo, was an official and scholar of the state of Shu Han in the Three Kingdoms period of China. After the fall of Shu in 263, he continued serving under the Jin dynasty, that succeeded Cao Wei state in 266.

== Life ==
Li Mi was born in Wuyang, Qianwei Commandery (犍為郡), which is present-day Pengshan County, Sichuan. His grandfather, Li Guang (李光) was the administrator of Zhuti (朱提太守). His father died just after his birth. His mother remarried thereafter and as a child, he was left under the care of his grandmother. Li Mi deeply loved and missed his parents, so much so that he became severely sick. However, his grandmother whose surname was Liu (劉) would console him and raised him well. Although, he grew up in complicated circumstances. Li Mi was eager to learn, he was a student under Qiao Zhou who provided him with good instruction. Li Mi studied the Zuo zhuan and had extensive knowledge in the Four Books and Five Classics. Furthermore, he was well-read in classical text. He was quick witted, discerning and eloquent in his speech.

Li Mi was known for his filial piety towards his grandmother. When she was ill, he would shed tears and hold his breath in grief, never removing his mourning attire day or night. He personally tasted all her meals and medicines before giving them to her. He was offered a position in his hometown but declined. Later, he was appointed in Shu Han as Assistant Officer (從事), Gentleman of the Masters of Writing (尚書郎), Registrar (主簿) to the Chief-General (大將軍) and a Xima (洗馬; master of the stable) to the Crown Prince.

Later, Li Mi was sent on a diplomatic mission to the state of Wu. The ruler of Wu asked him about the number of horses in Shu to which Li Mi replied: "There are enough for official use and the people have plenty for their own needs." He assisted to a discussion on morality and principles with the ruler and his ministers. Most of the officials wished to be a younger brother. However, Li Mi expressed his desire to be an elder brother. The ruler of Wu asked him: "Why do you wish to be an elder brother?" Li Mi replied: "Because the days of providing and nurturing as an elder brother are longer." Those present praised him for his response. Li Mi would often serve as envoy for Shu and was commended by the officials of Wu.

Following the Conquest of Shu by Wei, Deng Ai who was in charge of the western campaign heard of his reputation and invited him to serve as his Registrar (主簿). However, Li Mi refused all invitations and declined official positions from both the state of Cao Wei and the provincial government due to his devotion to caring for his elderly grandmother. He focused on his scholarly pursuits, establishing a school and mentoring students.

When Emperor Wu established his son Sima Zhong as the Crown Prince in 267, he summoned Li Mi to serve as a Xima (master of the stable). Despite numerous imperial edicts and pressure from the commandery and county, Li Mi did not change his opinion as he wanted to look after his grandmother. Therefore, he submitted a memorial explaining his devotion to his grandmother. The text which have been preserved is called Chen Qing Biao (陳情表). Sima Yan read it and said: "Li Mi is not a man of empty reputation." He appreciated Li Mi's sincerity and loyalty granting him two servants and ordering the commandery and county to provide for the expenses of his grandmother.

After his grandmother's death and the end of his mourning period, Li Mi was again submitted to serve as a Xima (master of the stable) at the capital Luoyang. When he met Zhang Hua, he asked him to who he would compare Liu Shan. Li Mi answered to Duke Huan of Qi comparing Huan's employment of Guan Zhong, resistance to the foreign threats and later loss of his power to factionalism with Liu Shan's employment of Zhuge Liang, resistance to the Wei court and loss of his power to Huang Hao. Zhang Hua then asked him if Zhuge Liang's principles are fragmented. Li Mi compared Zhuge Liang's teaching to the discussions between Yu the Great and Gao Yao saying that their speech were refined yet fragmented to be accessible to all. Zhuge Liang had no match in his exchange therefore it is natural for his lessons to be fragmented and accessible to everyone. Zhang Hua approved his answers.

Li Mi was transferred from his position as Gentleman of the Masters of Writing (尚書郎) to the Magistrate of Wen County (溫縣令) in Henan. He implemented virtuous policies and was known for his strict and clear governance. When the Marquis of Juping (鉅平侯), Yang Hu died without an heir, Sima Yan ordered a relative to succeed him but did not attend the funeral in a timely manner. Li Mi sent an official to deliver the notice and arranged for the funeral procession.

Wen County, Henan was the ancestral home of the Sima clan therefore whenever the members of the imperial family passed throughout it, they would demand provisions causing distress among the officials and the people. When Li Mi was transferred as the new prefect and a Sima relative requested supplies. Li Mi wrote a letter citing the example of Emperor Gaozu of Han's visit to Pei County, his birthplace where he treated everyone with courtesy without causing any trouble or expense. Afterward, the princes did not dare to bother the county with their demands.

Bandits in other counties of the region did not dare to approach the territory under Li Mi's jurisdiction and even those pursuing the bandits did not dare to cross the county borders. The King of Longxi (隴西王), Sima Tai (司馬泰) deeply admired him therefore befriended Li Mi. However, other powerful and influential families feared his impartiality and integrity. Li Mi accepted his position as Prefect and completed his duties but hated his work. He wrote to others complaining that his talent was wasted on such a minor task. His words were reported to his supervisor but since he diligently resolved the affairs in Wen county. His speech was overlooked.

Li Mi left his position and became a zhongzheng (中正; Impartial and Just) of the State. Due to his upright and candid nature, he did not yield to those with power or status causing him to lose the support of influential clans like Xun (荀) and Zhang (張). Therefore although talented, he was isolated from the assistance of others. As a result, he was demoted to the position of Administrator of Hanzhong (漢中太守). Many members of the Sima family regarded this as an injustice. From this, Li Mi harbored ressentment believing he lost the opportunity to become a major official. Sima Yan hold a farewell banquet for him however during the feast, Li Mi wrote a poem where in the last chapter he harshly criticized the decision of his "superiors". Sima Yan was furious and relieved him of his appointment. After one year, Li Mi died at his home at the age of 64 (by East Asian age reckoning).

== Appraisal and anecdote ==
Chang Qu, who wrote Li Mi's biography in the Chronicles of Huayang (Huayang Guo Zhi), (Note: Li Mi's biography is recorded in the volume 11 of the Huayang Guo Zhi, titled Biographies of later worthies (後賢志), covering the life of notable persons from the Sichuan region who lived during the Jin dynasty.) appraised Li Mi as follows: "Brilliant talent, whose ability overshadow others."

Li Mi wrote the Shu Li Lun (述理論; Shu theory) which discussed moderation, benevolence and righteousness along with the doctrines of Confucianism and Taoism. It consisted of ten chapters. It received praises and was deeply appreciated. Li Mi also debated with others on various topics whether philosical or political. In their discussions with him on interpreting classics, many were impressed with his logical reasoning. Moreover, he wrote over twenty poems and essays in response to a satirical funeral eulogies.

When Shou Liang, Li Xiang, and Chen Shou debated their relative merits and faults. Li Mi would openly state and evaluate their achievements and failures. He would often say: "I stand alone in the world considering the landscape as my field, without fear because my heart is impartial towards others."

== Family ==
Li Mi had six famous and outstanding sons who were called the "Six Dragons" (六龍). His eldest son, Li Ci (李賜), whose courtesy name, was Zongshuo (宗碩) served as Bieja (別駕; important assistant to the governor of the province), was recommended as a xiucai (秀才; person who passed the county level imperial exam) and the Administrator of Wenshan (汶山太守) but died before he could complete his appointment. He had a close friendship with Sima Yue, the Prince of Donghai (東海王) and they often exchanged poetry with a fresh and innovative style.

Li Mi's younger son, Li Xing (李興), whose courtesy name, was Jueshuo (雋碩), was also known for his poetry talents and served as an aide to the Grand Tutor (太傅). Later, he joined the army and accompanied Liu Hong as he travelled to Longzhong (隆中), they arrived to the former residence of Zhuge Liang in Jing province before he joined Liu Bei, Liu Hong ordered a stele to be built and had Li Xing write the content in Zhuge Liang's honor. The content has been praised and is still preserved today.

Another of his younger son, Li Shengshuo (李盛碩) was the Administrator of Ningpu (寧浦太守).

== Gao Wan ==
Around the same time as Li Mi, Gao Wan (高玩) was born in Shu Commandery (蜀郡; present-day Chengdu, Sichuan) and his courtesy name was Bozhen (伯珍). He studied under the Minister of Ceremonies (太常) Du Qiong when he was young. He was known for his subtle skills and profound knowledge as well as his adherence to simplicity and purity. Gao Wan and Li Mi were considered equals in reputation and held similar positions in the Shu Han government.

After Cao Wei's abdication to Western Jin, Gao Wan was nominated as a xiaolian (civil service candidate) and appointed as the Magistrate of Quyang (曲陽令). He traveled to his new post alone and without extravagant expenses, not allowing the county to send a welcoming party. Thereafter, he was summoned by the imperial court to serve as the Court Astronomer (太史令). When he left, he asked the farewell party to not cross the county border and the imperial court praised him for this conduct. Just when the court was discussing how to make good use of him, Gao Wan suddenly died.

== See also ==
- Lists of people of the Three Kingdoms
