= Wang Hua =

3rd century Shu Han official and scholar

- 王化

Administrator of Zitong (梓潼太守)
- In office ?–?
- Monarch: Sima Yan

Prefect of Lexi (樂涫令)
- In office ?–?
- Monarch: Sima Yan

Prefect of Langzhong (閬中令)
- In office ?–?
- Monarch: Liu Shan

Gentleman of the Masters of Writing (尚書郎)
- In office ?–?
- Monarch: Liu Shan

Officer of Merit (功曹)
- In office ?–?
- Monarch: Liu Shan

Personal details
- Born: Unknown; Guanghan, Sichuan
- Died: Unknown (aged 71); Zitong East of Mianyang, Sichuan
- Relations: Wang Tang (ancestor); Wang Shang (grandfather); Wang Zhen (brother); Wang Dai (brother); Wang Chong (brother)
- Parent: Wang Peng (father)
- Occupation: Official, scholar
- Courtesy name: Boyuan (伯遠)
- Peerage: Secondary Marquis (關內侯)

Wang Hua (fl. 250s–270s), courtesy name Boyuan, was an official and scholar of the state of Shu Han in the Three Kingdoms period of China. After the fall of Shu in 263, he continued serving under the Jin dynasty, that succeeded Cao Wei state in 266.

== Life ==
Wang Hua was born in Qi, Guanghan Commandery (廣漢郡), which is present-day Guanghan, Sichuan. He was a descendant of Wang Tang (王堂), the Court Architect (將作大匠) of the Han dynasty. His grandfather, Wang Shang (王商), whose courtesy name, was Wenbiao (文表) was a highly respected official with great virtues, serving as the Administrator of Shu Commandery (為蜀太守) when Liu Zhang was Governor of Yi Province (益州牧). His biography was recorded in the Yibu Qijiu Zhuan (益部耆舊傳; "Biographies of Famous People from Yi Province"). His father, Wang Peng (王彭), whose courtesy name, was Zhong (仲), was the Administrator of Ba Commandery (巴郡太守).

Wang Hua had three brothers, all of whom were well regarded from a young age. Wang Hua himself, was well-versed in the Mao Commentary, Three Ritual Classics and Gongyang Zhuan. He was appointed as Officer of Merit (功曹) by the Shu Han government then as an Assistant Officer (從事). He successively held the positions of guanglu langzhong (光祿郎中; "Gentleman of the Household and Palace"), Main Adviser (主事; host and manage affairs) and Gentleman of the Masters of Writing (尚書郎).

Furthermore, he was assigned to be the Prefect of Langzhong (閬中令) where he was known for his quiet and efficient administration. Later, he was nominated as xiaolian (civil service candidate). After Cao Wei's abdication to Jin, Wang Hua served as an official to the new dynasty and was once again nominated as xiaolian (civil service candidate). He became the Prefect of Lexi (樂涫令). The county was near the border and faced rebellion from the foreign tribes. Wang Hua led the officials and people to store food and defend the city. The enemy cut off their supply lines and besieged them for seven years. Wang Hua seized the opportunity when the enemy became complacent and led his army to attack sending some of his people to obtain supplies from the plunder.

When the main force arrived, the enemy retreated and Wang Hua was enfeoffed as a Secondary Marquis (關內侯) for his achievements. He was then promoted as the Administrator of Zhuti (朱提太守). Wang Hua pacified and assimilated the different local customs winning the hearts of both the ethnic tribes and the people of the Jin Dynasty. He was later appointed as Administrator of Zitong (梓潼太守) and continued to achieve commendable results. As a person, he was strict and serious with a refined and elegant eloquence. Moreover, he was fair and honest hence the people in Yi Province respected his sincerity and integrity. At the age of 72 (by East Asian age reckoning), he died while serving in office.

== Appraisal ==
Chang Qu, who wrote Wang Hua's biography in the Chronicles of Huayang (Huayang Guo Zhi), (Note: Wang Hua's biography is recorded in the eleventh volume of the Huayang Guo Zhi, titled Biographies of later worthies (後賢志), covering the life of notable persons from the Sichuan region who lived during the Jin dynasty.) appraised Wang Hua as follows: "Maintain his composure even in danger, bring stability."

== See also ==
- Lists of people of the Three Kingdoms
