= Qiao Zhou =

Shu Han official and scholar (died 270)

- 譙周

Regular Mounted Attendant (散騎常侍)
- In office 263 – ?
- Monarchs: Cao Huan / Emperor Wu of Jin

Cavalry Commandant (騎都尉)
- In office 263 – ?
- Monarchs: Cao Huan / Emperor Wu of Jin

Household Counsellor (光祿大夫)
- In office ? – 263
- Monarch: Liu Shan

Attendant Counsellor (中散大夫)
- In office ?–?
- Monarch: Liu Shan

Personal details
- Born: 199 Langzhong, Sichuan
- Died: late 270 (Note: The Sanguozhi mentioned that Qiao Zhou died in the winter (10th to 12th months) of the 6th year of the Taishi era (265-274) during the reign of Emperor Wu of Jin. The months correspond to 1 Nov 270 to 27 Jan 271 in the Julian calendar.)
- Relations: Qiao Deng and Qiao Xiu (grandsons)
- Children: Qiao Xi; Qiao Xian; Qiao Tong
- Parent: Qiao Pin (father)
- Occupation: Astronomer, historian, politician, writer
- Courtesy name: Yunnan (允南)
- Peerage: Marquis of Yangcheng Village (陽城亭侯)

Qiao Zhou (c.199 (Note: According to Qiao Zhou's biography in Sanguozhi, in the 5th year of the Taishi era of Sima Yan's reign (269), he remarked that he had just passed the age of 70 (by East Asian reckoning). Thus by calculation, his birth year should be in 199.) – late 270), courtesy name Yunnan, was a Chinese astronomer, historian, politician, and writer of the state of Shu Han during the Three Kingdoms period of China. He is particularly notable for being the teacher of many Shu Han (and later Cao Wei / Western Jin) officials. Among them are Chen Shou, Luo Xian, Du Zhen, Wen Li and Li Mi.

During his lifetime, Qiao Zhou was regarded as lacking talent and was not respected by many of his peers. Only Yang Xi regarded Qiao Zhou highly. Yang Xi even once said: "Like us, the later generations can never be as good as this great man." Because of this, Yang Xi earned praise from those individuals who also recognised Qiao Zhou for his talent.

Qiao Zhou served in the Shu Han government during Liu Bei’s rule and continued until the fall of Shu in 263. He is remembered for persuading the Shu emperor Liu Shan to surrender to Wei in 263.

== Life ==
Qiao Zhou was orphaned at a young age; he then lived together with his maternal uncle (an elder brother of his mother).

During the Jianxing era (223–237) of Liu Shan's reign, after Zhuge Liang was appointed Governor of Yi Province, he appointed Qiao to his first official post of Assistant Officer of Education (勸學從事). (Note: This record is in conflict with the one found in Liu Bei's biography in Sanguozhi, which indicated that Qiao Zhou was already an Assistant Officer of Education (together with Zhang Shuang and Yin Mo) when he became part of the group of petitioners who persuaded Liu to take the imperial title after Cao Pi established Cao Wei in late 220.) (Note: The Shu Ji recorded that when Zhuge Liang first met Qiao Zhou, those around them began laughing for some reason. An official in charge of court decorum advised Zhuge Liang to remove those who had laughed. Zhuge replied, "Even I couldn't help but laugh, what more for those around us?") In 234, Qiao was at home when he received news that Zhuge had died during his last campaign at Wuzhang Plains; he immediately set out to pay respects to the chancellor. Later, there was an imperial edict banning people from doing so. Thus, Qiao Zhou was the only one who managed to pay his respects due to his swift actions beffcore the ban took effect.

== Assessments of Qiao Zhou's surrender stance ==
In the Records of the Three Kingdoms (Sanguozhi), the historian Chen Shou praised Qiao's proposal to Liu Shan for preserving the Liu ex-royal family and helping Shu Han. It can be argued that Chen's views reflect his position as a subordinate of the Western Jin dynasty and also because Qiao was Chen's teacher. Historians with different viewpoints, such as Sun Sheng, heavily criticized Qiao Zhou's stance of surrender, calling Qiao a "traitor".

Yi Zhongtian commented that Qiao's "treachery" was not due to his personality (Qiao was well known for his good moral conduct) but because of a difference in political stance. Qiao Zhou was the representative of the local Shu intelligentsia (shizu; 士族) who had long been at odds with Shu Han's government due to:

1. The Shu government had long been mainly made up of "foreign" magistrates who competed against the local nobility for governmental posts and political power. Liu Yan, Liu Zhang, Liu Bei and their close associates were mostly not local Shu nobility. Zhuge Liang later enacted a "fair" talent enrolment process, which employed many local Shu scholars and intellectuals and so managed to earn their respect and support. However, he failed to completely resolve the conflict.
2. Zhuge Liang's fair and transparent rule of law was harmful for the nobility because it restricted their social privileges and prevented them from influencing local politics. Meanwhile, the nine-rank system of Cao Wei and later Western Jin enabled the nobility to recommend and promote their own scions, which was beneficial for the local Shu clans.
3. The Shu Han government relentlessly launched the northern expeditions against Cao Wei, resulting in heavy expenditure. Such expenditure was not only a major burden for the common people, but also was harmful for the Shu nobility since taxes were also imposed on them.

As a result, it is argued by critics of Qiao Zhou that by betraying the Shu Han state and surrendering to Cao Wei, Qiao Zhou's actions were beneficial for the local Shu nobility, who welcomed Cao Wei's invasion.

== In Romance of the Three Kingdoms ==
In the 14th-century historical novel Romance of the Three Kingdoms, Qiao Zhou is depicted as an astrologer whose studies greatly aided Zhuge Liang during the Northern Expeditions against Shu's rival state Cao Wei.

== See also ==
- Lists of people of the Three Kingdoms
