= Wen Li (Shu Han) =

Shu Han official and scholar (died 279)

- 文立

Minister of the Guards (衛尉)
- In office ? – 279
- Monarch: Emperor Wu of Jin

Administrator of Jiyin (濟陰太守)
- In office 266 – 267
- Monarch: Sima Yan

Bieja (別駕)
- In office 264 – 266
- Monarch: Cao Huan

Master of Writing (尚書)
- In office ?–?
- Monarch: Liu Shan

Gentleman of the Masters of Writing (尚書郎)
- In office ?–?
- Monarch: Liu Shan

Personal details
- Born: Unknown Zhong County, Chongqing
- Died: 279 Luoyang, Henan
- Occupation: Official, scholar
- Courtesy name: Guangxiu (廣休)

Wen Li (died 279), courtesy name Guangxiu, was an official and scholar of the state of Shu Han in the Three Kingdoms period of China. After the fall of Shu in 263, he continued serving under the Cao Wei state, then the succeeding Jin dynasty in 266.

== Life ==
Wen Li was born in Linjiang, Ba Commandery (巴郡), which is present-day Zhong County, Chongqing. Mao Chu (毛楚) and Yang Chong (楊崇), both from the same Ba Commandery (巴郡) as Wen Li, were also known for their virtues and talents. Yang Chong served as the Administrator of Wuling (武陵太守). In his youth, he studied at the Taixue (太學; Imperial Academy) of Shu Han where he specialized himself into Classic of Poetry and The Three Rites as well as a wide range of other texts. He was a student of Qiao Zhou. Among his fellow disciples, he was compared to Yan Hui due to his eagerness to learn and modesty. While other of his classmates such as Chen Shou and Li Mi were compared to Yan Yan and Bu Shang. Along with them, Luo Xian was compared to Duanmu Ci.

When Fei Yi was the Inspector of Yi Province (益州刺史; from 244 to 253), Wen Li served as his secretary. Thereafter, he was appointed Gentleman of the Masters of Writing (尚書郎). While Fei Yi was General-in-Chief (大將軍), Wen Li was also employed to serve as an assistant official in the east bureau of his office. Later, he was relocated as Master of Writing (尚書; wrote up and distributed imperial edicts).

After the conquest of Shu by Wei, he started his career under Wei in Liang Province as Bieja (別駕; important assistant to the governor of the province) where he selected people recommended as xiucai (秀才; person who passed the county level imperial exam) and langzhong (郎中; "Gentleman of the Palace"). When Emperor Wu wanted to bring more talent from Liang and Yi provinces, Wen Li was selected among other outstanding scholars. In 266, he was appointed as Administrator of Jiyin (濟陰太守).

When Sima Yan established his son Sima Zhong as the Crown Prince in 267, he appointed the Minister of Works, Li Yin (李胤) as the Prince's tutor, and selected Sima You (司马攸) and Wen Li to be his junior tutors. Wen Li served as zhongshuzi (中庶子) whose role was to manage part of the imperial palace and provide guidance to the crown prince.

Afterwards, Wen Li submitted a memorial stating that the Crown Prince was a gifted and virtuous young man with a bright future, and that the attendants who served him should be selected from among talented and virtuous men. Wen Li further advised that the attendants should be observant and attentive to the Crown Prince's manners and conduct, listen carefully to his words, and be ready to respond with wisdom and insight. He emphasized the great responsibility of serving as attendants to the Crown Prince, which could only be entrusted to the most capable and virtuous individuals.

Sima Yan responded favorably to him by quoting an old saying. Thereafter, Wen Li wrote another memorial in which he appealed for clemency and recommended that the descendants of officials who had served the former state of Shu, including Zhuge Liang, Jiang Wan and Fei Yi should be employed and rewarded regardless of the past, in order to comfort the people of Ba–Shu regions and to furthermore encourage people of Wu to submit to Jin. His propositions were adopted.

Later, Sima Yan issued an edict where he praised Zhuge Liang for his fidelity toward his state and his son Zhuge Zhan for facing death with righteousness. Stating that Zhuge Liang's grandson Zhuge Jing (諸葛京) should be granted official position according to his ability. He also praised Fu Rong and Fu Qian for their loyalty and said that Fu Qian's sons. Fu Zhu (傅著) and Fu Mu (傅募) should be exempted from being commoners and employed them as officials.

In 274, an imperial edict stated: "The Crown Prince's attendant, Wen Li is loyal, steadfast and thoroughly sincere. Think with reason and act with talent. Previously, when he administered Jiyin, his governmence was clear and bright. Later, he assisted with the Imperial Palace and fulfilled his duties as a mentor. In the past, Emperor Guangwu pacified the regions of Shu by utilizing the talents of the local people, so they could provide him new directions thus achieving success in remote areas and promoting the development of those who were neglected. Therefore, it seems just to have Wen Li as Cavalier Attendant-in-Ordinary (散騎常侍)."

Wen Li repeatedly declined the offer, but Sima Yan did not accept his refusal. Therefore, Wen Li submitted a memorial saying: "The heart of a minister should desire thrift in order to cultivate gain. When it comes to human's emotion, greed should be quieted in order to make place to brightness. Yet, It is a natural tendency for people to covet the opportunity to go from obscurity to prominence. This is true for both the wise and the foolish. How could I be an exception? But when I think about it, I am neither talented nor capable of handling important affairs. I am merely a humble and foolish person; how could I face such an assignment?" An Imperial edict answered: ""The position Cavalier Attendant-in-Ordinary (散騎常侍) is bestowed upon those with talent. Why are you so modest?"

Wen Li continued to serve Sima Yan, offering suggestions on various matters and making significant contributions. He recruited talented people from Liang and Yi provinces, ensuring that they were fairly asserrted and given appropriate positions. As a result, he was highly regarded by his peers. A former Shu official, who worked as Master of Writing (尚書), Cheng Qiong (程瓊) was known as a virtuous man of high moral character. He had a close relationship with Wen Li. When Sima Yan heard of Cheng Qiong's reputation, he asked Wen Li about him. Wen Li replied: "I am very familiar with this person. However, he is almost eighty years old and, by nature modest and unassuming. He no longer holds the same aspirations as before and that is why I have not mentioned him to Your Majesty." Upon hearing this, Cheng Qiong said: "Guangxiu (Wen Li's courtesy name) can truly be considered impartial! That is why I have always admired him."

When horses were presented from the western border, Sima Yan asked Wen Li: "What do you think of the horses?" Wen Li replied: "I would like to ask the master of the stable." Sima Yan appreciated his humility and prudence. Wen Li was later promoted to the position of Minister of the Guards (衛尉) but still maintained his previous responsibilities. His virtuous and elegant demeanor was admired by the imperial court, and he became a renowned minister of the time.

He often submitted memorials requesting to be relieved of his duties due to his old age and to return to his hometown, but Sima Yan refused. Eventually, Wen Li died in 279. Sima Yan, knowing Wen Li's affection for his homeland ordered his burial in the Shu region and arranged for an envoy to accompany the funeral procession. The local government and people honored him greatly.

== Appraisal and anecdote ==
Chang Qu, who wrote Wen Li's biography in the Chronicles of Huayang (Huayang Guo Zhi), (Note: Wen Li's biography is recorded in the eleventh volume of the Huayang Guo Zhi, titled Biographies of later worthies (後賢志), covering the life of notable persons from the Sichuan region who lived during the Jin dynasty.) appraised Wen Li as follows: "Solemn aura, sense of sincerity and sage gentleman."

As Liu Shan's eldest son, Crown Prince Liu Xuan died in Zhong Hui's Rebellion, his second son Liu Yao (劉瑤) was expected to succeed him. However, Liu Shan's favorite son (his sixth son, Liu Xun (劉恂)) was chosen instead. Wen Li strongly advised against this decision, but his advice was not heeded. Liu Xun, who succeeded his father as the Duke of Anle (安樂公) in 271, grew up to be arrogant and cruel. People from Liang and Yi provinces wanted to submit a petition to have him removed from his position but Wen Li stopped them, arguing that the Duke's actions only harmed his own family and not the common people. Later, Liu Xun continued his licentious and immoral ways. He Pan, Wang Chong Administrator of Shangyong (上庸太守) and Zhang Yin (張寅) Administrator of Fuling (涪陵太守) wrote letters admonishing him and reminding him to reflect on Wen Li's advice. Wen Li wrote dozens of memorials, essays, poems, and praises who were collected into several volumes. But since then, most of them have been lost.

== See also ==
- Lists of people of the Three Kingdoms
