= Chen Shou =

Chinese historian (233–297)

Chen Shou 陳壽
- Born: Family name: Chén (陳); Given name: Shòu (壽); Courtesy name: Chéngzuò (承祚); 233 (Note: Chen Shou's biography in the Jin Shu mentioned that he died at the age of 65 (by East Asian age reckoning) in the 7th year of the Yuankang era (291–299) in the reign of Emperor Hui of Jin. By calculation, Chen Shou's birth year should be around 233.); Nanchong, Baxi Commandery, Shu Han
- Died: 297 (aged 64); Luoyang, Henan Commandery, Jin Dynasty
- Occupations: Historian, politician, writer
- Relatives: Chen Fu (nephew); Chen Li (nephew); Chen Jie (relative)
- Writing career
- Notable works: Records of the Three Kingdoms; Memoirs of Zhuge Liang; Biographies of Famous People from Yi Province; Records of Ancient States; Dissertation on Bureaucracy; Explaining Taboos; Guang Guo Lun

Chen Shou

Chinese name
- Traditional Chinese: 陳壽
- Simplified Chinese: 陈寿
Transcriptions
Standard Mandarin
- Hanyu Pinyin: Chén Shòu

Vietnamese name
- Vietnamese: Trần Thọ

Korean name
- Hangul: 진수
- Hanja: 陳壽
Transcriptions
- Revised Romanization: Jin Su

Japanese name
- Kanji: 陳壽
- Hiragana: ちん じゅ
Transcriptions
- Romanization: Chin Ju

Chen Shou (Chinese: 陳壽; 233 to 297), courtesy name Chengzuo (承祚), was a Chinese historian and official of Shu Han and the Western Jin dynasty. He studied under the scholar Qiao Zhou and held offices in Shu before entering Jin service after Shu's conquest in 263.

Chen Shou compiled the Records of the Three Kingdoms (Sanguozhi), a 65-volume history of Cao Wei, Shu Han, and Eastern Wu organized mainly as biographies. He drew on earlier histories of Wei and Wu and collected materials for Shu, which had no comparable official history. The work later became part of the Twenty-Four Histories.

== Historical sources on Chen Shou's life ==
There are two biographies of Chen Shou. The first one is in the Chronicles of Huayang, which was written by Chang Qu in the fourth century during the Eastern Jin dynasty. The second one is in the Book of Jin, which was written by Fang Xuanling and others in the seventh century during the Tang dynasty.

== Life ==
He started his career as an official in the state of Shu during the Three Kingdoms era but was demoted and sent out of the capital for his refusal to fawn on Huang Hao, an influential court eunuch in Shu in its twilight years. After the fall of Shu in 263, Chen Shou's career entered a period of stagnation before Zhang Hua recommended him to serve in the Jin government. He held mainly scribal and secretarial positions under the Jin government before dying from illness in 297. He had over 200 writings – about 30 of which he co-wrote with his relatives – attributed to him.

=== Early life and career in Shu Han ===
Chen Shou was from Anhan County (安漢縣), Baxi Commandery (巴西郡), which is in present-day Nanchong, Sichuan. He was known for being studious since he was young and was described as intelligent, insightful and knowledgeable. He was mentored by the Shu official Qiao Zhou, who was also from Baxi Commandery. Under Qiao Zhou's tutelage, he read the Classic of History and Three Commentaries on the Spring and Autumn Annals. He was very well versed in the Records of the Grand Historian and Book of Han.

According to the Jin Shu, Chen Shou served as a guange lingshi (觀閣令史; a clerk) in Shu. However, the Huayang Guozhi mentioned that he held the following appointments consecutively: Registrar (主簿) of the General of the Guards (衛將軍); donguan mishu lang (東觀秘書郎; an official librarian); Gentleman of Scattered Cavalry (散騎侍郎); and Gentleman of the Yellow Gate (黃門侍郎). In the final years of Shu (c. 250s–263), many officials fawned on Huang Hao, an influential court eunuch, in their bid to win his favour. Chen Shou's refusal to engage in such flattering and obsequious behaviour took a toll on his career: He was demoted on several occasions and sent out of the Shu capital, Chengdu.

=== Career in Jin dynasty ===
After the fall of Shu in 263, Chen Shou's career entered a period of stagnation until Zhang Hua recommended him to serve in the government of the Jin dynasty. Zhang Hua appreciated Chen Shou's talent and felt that even though Chen did not have an untarnished reputation, he did not deserve to be demoted and dismissed while he was in Shu. Chen Shou was recommended as a xiaolian (civil service candidate), and appointed as a zuo zhuzuo lang (佐著作郎; an assistant scribe) and the acting Prefect (令) of Yangping County (陽平縣). In 274, he collected and compiled the writings of Zhuge Liang, the first chancellor of Shu, and submitted them to the Jin imperial court. He was promoted to zhuzuo lang (著作郎; a scribe) and appointed as the zhongzheng (中正) of Baxi Commandery. The Huayang Guozhi mentioned that he also served as the Chancellor (相) to the Marquis of Pingyang (平陽侯).

When Zhang Hua recommended Chen Shou to serve as a Gentleman Palace Writer (中書郎), the Ministry of Personnel appointed Chen Shou as the Administrator (太守) of Changguang Commandery (長廣郡) instead on the recommendation of Xun Xu. The Jin Shu mentioned that Xun Xu detested Zhang Hua and disliked Chen Shou for his association with Zhang Hua, so he urged the Ministry of Personnel to reassign Chen Shou to another position. Chen Shou declined the appointment on the grounds that he had to look after his elderly mother. The Huayang Guozhi gave a different account of Chen Shou's relationship with Xun Xu. It stated that Xun Xu and Zhang Hua were very pleased with Chen Shou's Sanguozhi and they remarked that Chen Shou surpassed Ban Gu and Sima Qian. However, later, Xun Xu was displeased by the Wei Shu – one of the three sections in the Sanguozhi – and did not want Chen Shou to work in the same office as him, so he had Chen Shou reassigned to be the Administrator of Changguang.

In 278, before the general Du Yu assumed his appointment as the commander of the Jin military forces in Jing Province, he recommended Chen Shou to Emperor Wu and stated that Chen Shou was capable of serving as a Gentleman of the Yellow Gate (黃門侍郎) or Gentleman of Scattered Cavalry (散騎侍郎). Emperor Wu accepted Du Yu's suggestion and appointed Chen Shou as a yushi zhishu (御史治書; an auditor).

The Jin Shu mentioned that Chen Shou took a leave of absence when his mother died, and he fulfilled her dying wish to be buried in Luoyang. However, he ended up being castigated and demoted because his act of burying his mother in Luoyang – instead of in his hometown in Anhan County – was a violation of the proprieties of his time. The Huayang Guozhi gave a varying account of the events: It was Chen Shou's stepmother (not his biological mother) who died. She did not want to be buried together with his father (in Anhan County), so Chen Shou buried her in Luoyang.

=== Later years ===
According to the Jin Shu, many years after his demotion, Chen Shou was appointed as a zhongshuzi (中庶子; an aide) to the crown prince Sima Yu, but he did not assume his role. He died of illness at the age of 65 (by East Asian age reckoning) in 297 during the reign of Emperor Hui.

The Huayang Guozhi gave a different account of the events before Chen Shou's death. It stated that Chen Shou was appointed as a zhongshuzi to Sima Yu, but was reassigned to be a Regular Mounted Attendant (散騎常侍) again after the crown prince was deposed in 299. Emperor Hui told Zhang Hua, "(Chen) Shou possesses genuine talent. He should not remain in his current appointment for long." Zhang Hua wanted to nominate Chen Shou to take up one of the posts of the Nine Ministers, but lost his life in 300 CE during the War of the Eight Princes. Chen Shou died in Luoyang later. His talents and achievements were not reflected in his status at the time of his death and many people felt that it was an injustice to him. The Huayang Guozhi account apparently suggests that Chen Shou died in 300 CE or after, which did not match his year of death mentioned in the Jin Shu account.

== Sanguozhi ==
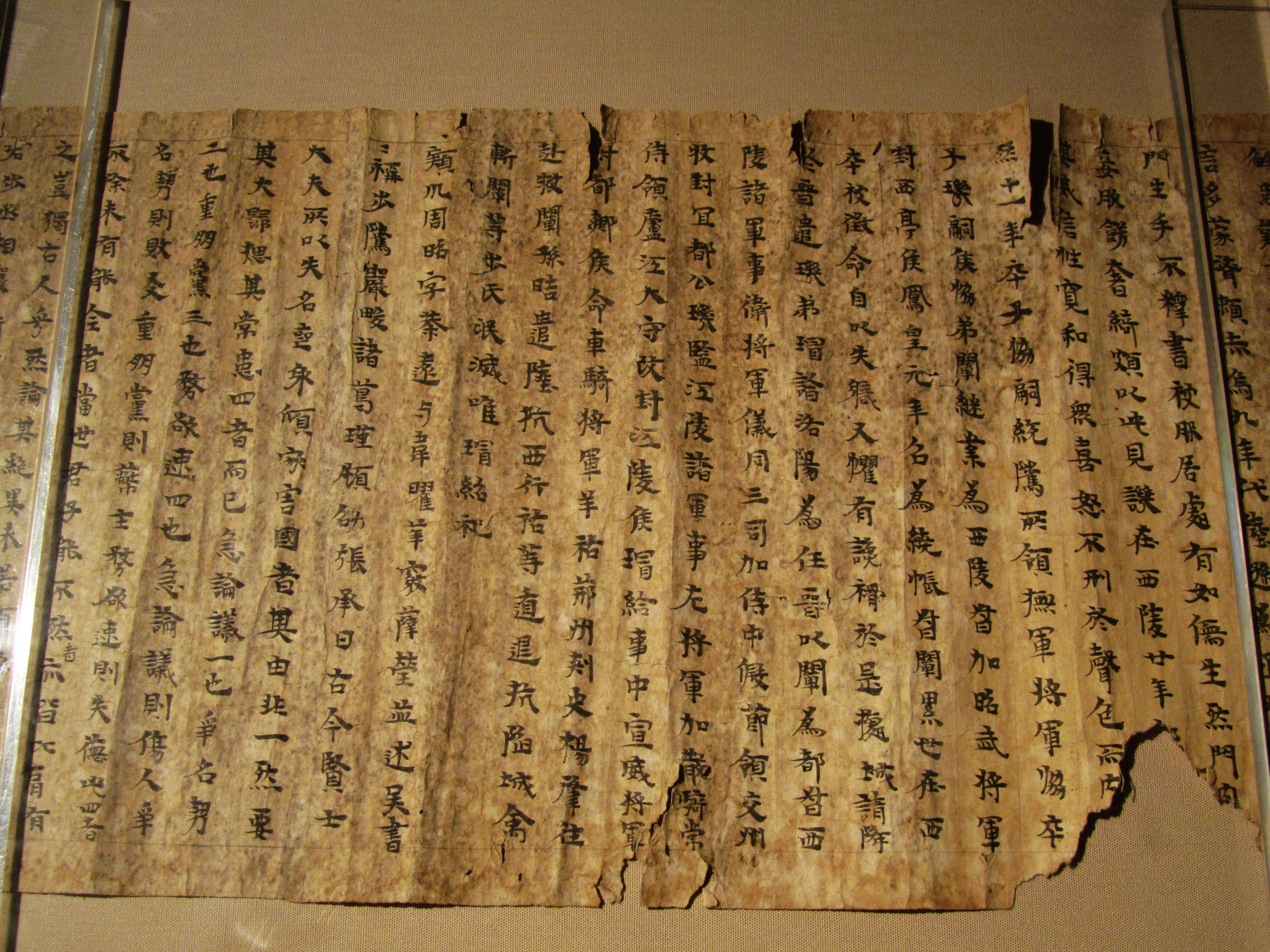
A fragment of the biography of Bu Zhi from the Records of the Three Kingdoms, part of the Dunhuang manuscripts

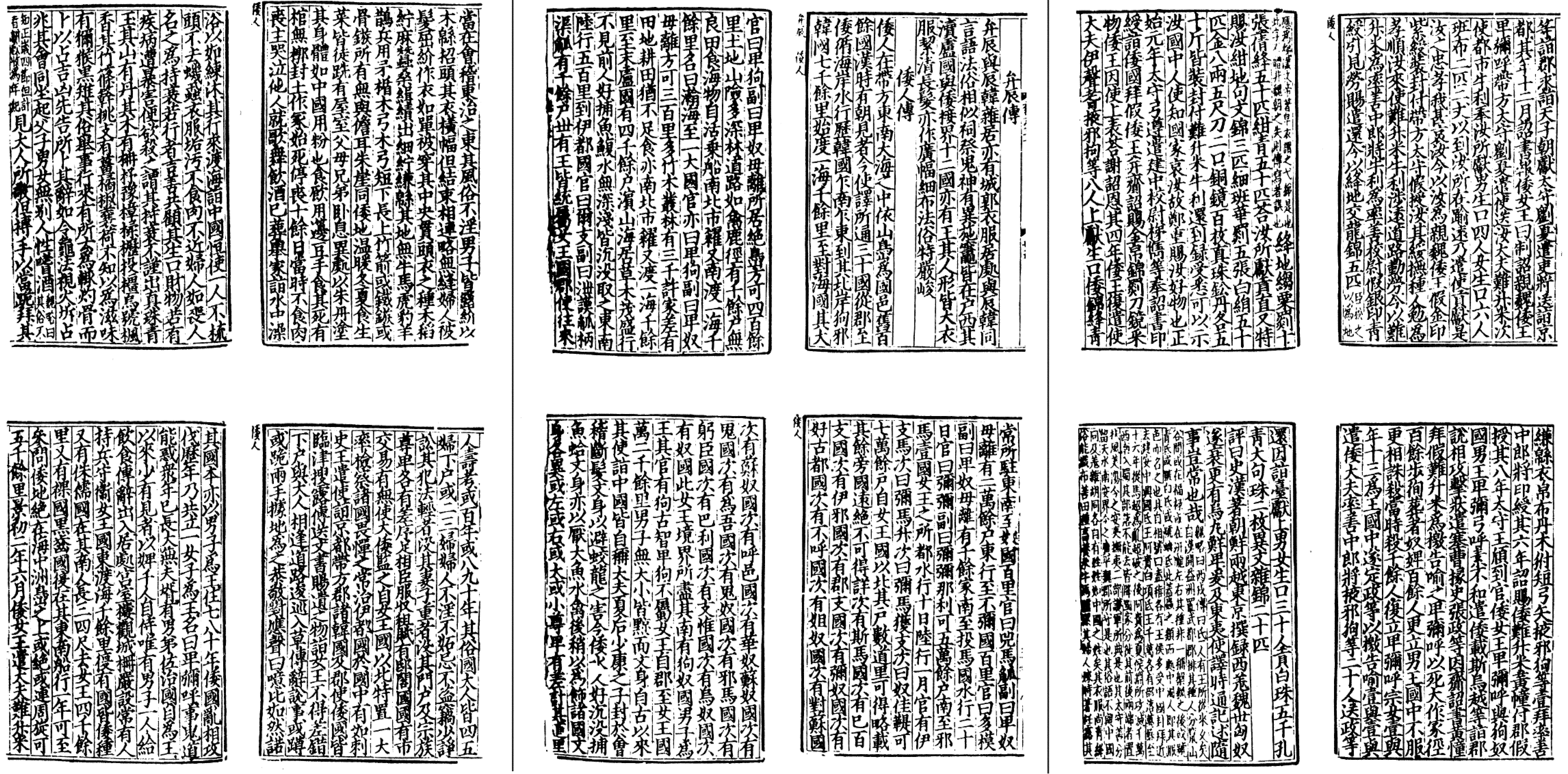
Text of the Wei Zhi (魏志, Records of Wei), which documents the history of Cao Wei, written circa 297

Sometime in the third century after 280, Chen Shou wrote his magnum opus: the 65-volume Sanguozhi (Records of the Three Kingdoms), which records the history of the late Eastern Han dynasty and the Three Kingdoms period. The text was divided into three sections – Book of Wei (魏書), Book of Shu (蜀書) and Book of Wu (吳書) – and was composed of mainly biographies of notable persons in those eras.

Chen Shou received acclaim from his contemporaries for his work and was praised as an excellent historian. Around the time, another historian, Xiahou Zhan (夏侯湛), was writing his own Book of Wei (魏書; Wei Shu), which recorded the history of Wei in the Three Kingdoms era. He destroyed his work after reading Chen Shou's Sanguozhi. Zhang Hua was so deeply impressed with the Sanguozhi that he told Chen Shou, "We should entrust the responsibility of writing the Book of Jin to you." Chen Shou was highly regarded as such after he wrote the Sanguozhi.

== Controversies ==
Despite his achievements, Chen Shou faced accusations and other controversies. The Jin Shu mentioned two controversies surrounding Chen Shou and his writing of the Sanguozhi, which his critics used to disparage him. Tang Geng (唐庚), a scholar from the Song dynasty, in his work called the Three Kingdoms Miscellaneous Cases (三國雜事; Sanguo Zashi) also criticised Chen Shou as a historian for two reasons.

=== Extorting bribe ===
The first one was about Chen Shou attempting to extort 1,000 hu (Note: Hu (斛) was an ancient Chinese unit of measurement of weight. Depending on the historical era, it could be equivalent to 5 or 10 dou (斗). 1 dou was equivalent to 120 jin. 1 jin ranges from 500g to about 605g by modern standards.) of grain from the sons of Ding Yi (丁儀) and his younger brother Ding Yi (丁廙) (Note: The younger Ding Yi's name was erroneously recorded as "Ding Hao" (丁暠) in the Jin Shu.) – two officials in Wei during the Three Kingdoms period. He promised them that he would write biographies for their fathers in the Sanguozhi if they gave him the grain, but they refused, so he did not write the biographies. However, the Jin Shu prefaced the anecdote with the term huoyun (或云), which meant "rumours".

The Qing dynasty writer Pan Mei (潘眉) rebutted the Jin Shu's account about Chen Shou attempting to extort from the Dings and called it "uninformed". He disproved the claim that the Ding brothers were very famous officials in Wei by pointing out that they had neither held important appointments nor made any significant achievements. Pan also felt that a historian was clearly justified if he decided to not write biographies for the Ding brothers, because, in his opinion, the Dings had committed grievous sins – instigating sibling rivalry and causing instability in the Wei imperial clan (Note: The Ding brothers were close associates of Cao Zhi, a younger brother of Wei's founding emperor, Cao Pi. In the mid 210s, Cao Pi and Cao Zhi engaged in a power struggle over the succession to their father's place. The contention concluded in 217 with victory for Cao Pi, who executed the Dings after he ascended the throne in 220.) – which made them unworthy of having biographies in historical records. Pan further noted that there were also other notable persons in Wei (e.g. Chen Lin, Wu Zhi and Yang Xiu) who did not have biographies in the Sanguozhi, so being notable did not mean that a person should have a biography written for him. His concluding remarks on this issue were that the Jin Shu made a malicious claim (about Chen Shou). (Note: Cao Zhi's biography in Records of the Three Kingdoms also recorded that the male members of the two Dings' families were all executed. This made it unlikely that the Dings had any direct male descendants.)

=== Bias ===
The second one suggested that Chen Shou held personal grudges against the Shu chancellor Zhuge Liang and his son Zhuge Zhan, hence he wrote negative comments about them in the Sanguozhi. Chen Shou's father (Note: The identity of Chen Shou's father is unknown.) was a military adviser to the Shu general Ma Su. When Ma Su was executed by Zhuge Liang after his failure at the Battle of Jieting in 228, Chen Shou's father was implicated and sentenced to kun (髡), a punishment involving the shaving of a person's head. Zhuge Zhan belittled Chen Shou before. When Chen Shou wrote the biographies of Zhuge Liang and Zhuge Zhan in the Sanguozhi, he commented on them as follows: Military leadership was not Zhuge Liang's forte, and he lacked the resourcefulness of a brilliant military leader; Zhuge Zhan excelled only in literary arts, and he had an exaggerated reputation.

The Qing dynasty writer Zhao Yi refuted the Jin Shu claim that Chen Shou was prejudiced against Zhuge Liang in the Sanguozhi, and remarked that the claim was "an uninformed statement". He commented that military leadership did not necessarily have to be regarded as Zhuge Liang's forte because Zhuge also made outstanding achievements in other fields. Zhao also pointed out two pieces of evidence which contradict the Jin Shu claim: Chen Shou gave highly positive comments about Zhuge Liang's ability as a politician in the Zhuge Liang Collection and in his personal commentary at the end of Zhuge's biography in the Sanguozhi. Zhao Yi's concluding remarks on this issue were that Chen Shou had clearly identified Zhuge Liang's strengths and weaknesses in his appraisal of Zhuge Liang in the Sanguozhi.

=== Claim that Shu Han lacked a historical bureau ===
Chen Shou in the biography of Liu Shan wrote that the state of Shu Han did not have a historical bureau or department, justifying the pitiful condition of the biography of their officials. Tang Geng cast doubt on this claim, remarking that although ancient texts advised to have one scribe write every word of his sovereign while another writes every action, those were merely hyperbolic terms. He provides past examples of people combining their role as historian alongside other function of the government. Furthermore, when the Rites of Zhou (pre-1st century BC) was written, even local warlords would have a historical bureau, so for Shu Han to suddenly lack one is suspect. Finally, he points out that Chen Shou contradicts the statement in the same biography when he wrote "the Historical Bureau (史官) reported the sighting of a brilliant star," just three paragraphs later.

=== Referring to Liu Bei and Liu Shan's state as Shu rather than Han ===
Tang Geng commented that since the Records of the Grand Historian until his own time, every state in official history is referred to by the name they used no matter their circumstances as it was basic decency to do so. However, Chen Shou was the sole historian who made an exception for Shu Han. Throughout its existence, Liu Bei and Liu Shan always used the name "Han" for their state since they were positioning themselves as a continuation of the Han dynasty. While "Shu" was a geographical term for where their state was based in, it was also a derisive name used by the Wei and Jin dynasties to discredit their claim of continuing the Han. Chen Shou opted to use the name "Shu" in his works, which in Tang Geng's view, was a deliberate neglect of impartiality to appease his patrons and personal animosity.

To contrast, he brought up a similar situation during the Five Dynasties and Ten Kingdoms period, where the Southern Tang was called Wu and the Northern Han was called Jin in derogative manners. Yet, historical documents still refer to them by their respective self titles. Tang Geng then laments that recently, someone had used Chen Shou's works as an example to convince a historian to not record the events he considered minor.

== Other works ==
According to the Jin Shu, Chen Shou collected and compiled the writings of Zhuge Liang during his early career under the Jin dynasty. The compiled text was called Shu Xiang Zhuge Liang Ji (蜀相諸葛亮集; Collection of the Shu Chancellor Zhuge Liang). The Huayang Guozhi mentioned that later on, Zhang Hua proposed to Emperor Wu to have the text reorganized and composed as a 24-volumes. At the time, Shou Liang was also doing his own research on Zhuge Liang's works, with his outcome quite different from Chen Shou's original version. In the end, the text was rewritten, and became the Zhuge Liang Gushi (諸葛亮故事; Memoirs of Zhuge Liang).

Since the end of the Jianwu era (25–56 CE) in the Eastern Han dynasty, writers such as Zheng Boyi (鄭伯邑), Zhao Yanxin (趙彥信), Chen Shenbo (陳申伯), Zhu Yuanling (祝元靈) and Wang Wenbiao (王文表) had co-written the Bashu Qijiu Zhuan (巴蜀耆舊傳; Biographies of Famous People from Bashu). Chen Shou felt that the Bashu Qijiu Zhuan was not comprehensive enough, so he expanded it to the 10-volume Yibu Qijiu Zhuan (益部耆舊傳; Biographies of Famous People from Yi Province). (Note: The book was called Yidu Qijiu Zhuan (益都耆舊傳; Biographies of Famous People from Yi Province's Capital) in the Jin Shu.) His work was presented by the official Wen Li (文立) to Emperor Wu, who praised it.

Other writings by Chen Shou include: the 50-volume Gu Guo Zhi (古國志; Records of Ancient States), which received high praise; the 7-volume Guansi Lun (官司論; Dissertation on Bureaucracy), which used historical examples to discuss reforms; Shi Yi (釋諱; Explaining Taboos); Guang Guo Lun (廣國論); Wei Mingchen Zou (魏名臣奏; Memorials by Notable Officials of Cao Wei).

== Family and relatives ==
Chen Fu (陳符), whose courtesy name was Changxin (長信), was the son of Chen Shou's elder brother. He was also known for his literary talent and he succeeded his uncle as an Assistant Gentleman of Writing. He also served as the Prefect (令) of Shanglian County (上廉縣).

Chen Fu's younger brother, Chen Li (陳蒞), whose courtesy name was Shudu (叔度), served as an Attendant Officer (別駕) in Liang Province and later under Sima You, the Prince of Qi (齊王) and General of Agile Cavalry (驃騎將軍). He also died in Luoyang.

Chen Li had a younger relative, Chen Jie (陳階), whose courtesy name was Dazhi (達之). Chen Jie assumed the following appointments: Registrar (主簿) of the governor of Yi Province; baozhongling (褒中令); West Commandant (西部都尉) of Yongchang Commandery (永昌郡); Administrator (太守) of Jianning (建寧) and Xinggu (興古) commanderies. Chen Jie was also well known for his literary talent.

Chen Fu, Chen Li and Chen Jie each wrote more than 10 works out of the over 200 writings attributed to Chen Shou.

== Anecdotes ==
=== Filial mourning period ===
The Jin Shu mentioned that Chen Shou fell sick during the filial mourning period after his father's death. Some guests who visited his home expressed disapproval when they saw him being served medicine by his servants, because he was expected to lead an austere life during that period. His fellow townsfolk criticised him when they heard about it.

=== Conflict with Li Xiang ===
According to the Huayang Guozhi, Chen Shou was a close friend of Li Xiang, courtesy name was Shulong (叔龍), from Zitong Commandery (梓潼郡). Li Xiang was famous for his talent and capacity, his reputation was similar to Chen Shou. He was recommended as a xiucai (秀才) and served as a Gentleman of Writing (尚書郎). He was reassigned to be the Administrator (太守) of Jianping Commandery (建平郡), but he declined the appointment and claimed that he was ill because he wanted to remain in his home province. He was then appointed as the Administrator of Guanghan Commandery (廣漢郡 around present-day Guanghan, Sichuan). Relations between Chen Shou and Li Xiang deteriorated and they started making false accusations against each other. Other officials scorned them for their petty quarrels.

=== Qiao Zhou's advice to Chen Shou ===
According to the Jin Shu, Chen Shou's mentor, Qiao Zhou, often told Chen, "You'll become famous for your talent. However, it might not be a misfortune if you encounter any setback. You should be more mindful about what you do." Fang Xuanling remarked that Chen Shou's experiences – being demoted and humiliated when he was in Shu, and again while he was serving under the Jin dynasty – fitted what Qiao Zhou said about him.

== Appraisal ==
Chang Qu, who wrote Chen Shou's biography in the Chronicles of Huayang (Huayang Guo Zhi), (Note: Chen Shou's biography is recorded in the eleventh volume of the Huayang Guo Zhi, titled Biographies of later worthies (後賢志), covering the life of notable persons from the Sichuan region who lived during the Jin dynasty.) appraised Chen Shou as follows: "Learn from the past, promote and consolidate those reflections."

== Legacy ==
After Chen Shou's death, the official Fan Jun (范頵) and others wrote a memorial to Emperor Hui: "In the past, Emperor Wu of Han issued an imperial decree: 'Sima Xiangru is critically ill. Retrieve his writings.' The emissary who collected Sima Xiangru's writings told Emperor Wu about the fengshan ceremonies, which were mentioned in Sima's writings. The emperor was very surprised. We, Your Majesty's subjects, propose: The late zhishu shi yushi Chen Shou wrote the Sanguozhi, which contains good advice and evaluates successes and failures. It is beneficial to promoting culture. Even though its writing style is not comparable to the works of (Sima) Xiangru, its message is simpler and clearer. We hope that it can be collected and reproduced." Emperor Hui approved and issued an imperial decree ordering the Intendant of Henan (河南尹) and Prefect of Luoyang (洛陽令) to send scribes to Chen Shou's house and copy the Sanguozhi.

In the fifth century, Emperor Wen of the Liu Song dynasty felt that Chen Shou's Sanguozhi was too short and not comprehensive enough, so he commissioned Pei Songzhi to annotate the Sanguozhi. Pei Songzhi completed his assignment in 429. He included new materials he collected through research, and added his personal commentary. Pei Songzhi's annotations increased the length of the Sanguozhi to nearly twice its original.

=== Wanjuanlou ===
The Wanjuanlou (萬卷樓; 万卷楼; Wànjuànlóu; 'tower of 10', '000 volumes of writings') – a tourist attraction in the Xishan Scenic Spot, Shunqing District, Nanchong, Sichuan – is named the source of the culture of the Three Kingdoms period by the Sichuan provincial government. The tower was constructed in the early third century (222–237) during the Three Kingdoms era. It was also the place where Chen Shou studied in his early life. It was destroyed in the 1960s after years of neglect, but was rebuilt in 1990 by the Chinese government at a cost of four million yuan.

The present tower, which covers an area of 2,400 square metres, consists of three main attractions – the Reading Tower of Chen Shou, the Chen Shou Memorial Hall, and Collecting Books Tower. The tower has on display a collection of writings, illustrations, objects and photographs related to Chen Shou's life, his works and his legacy.

== See also ==
- Lists of people of the Three Kingdoms
- Records of the Three Kingdoms
- Annotated Records of the Three Kingdoms
