= Pengshan, Meishan =

Coordinates: 30°11′36″N 103°52′00″E

Pengshan 彭山区
- District
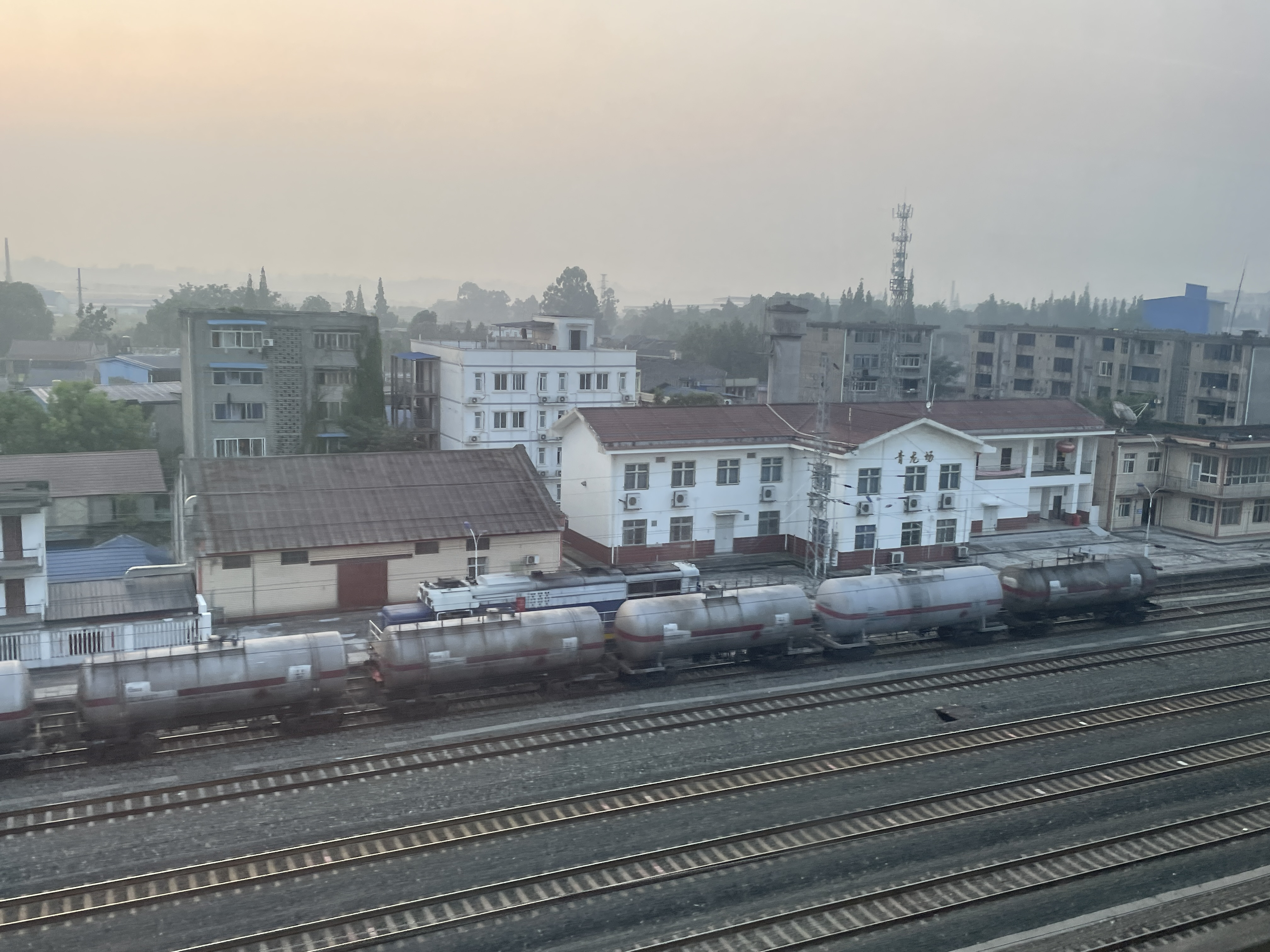

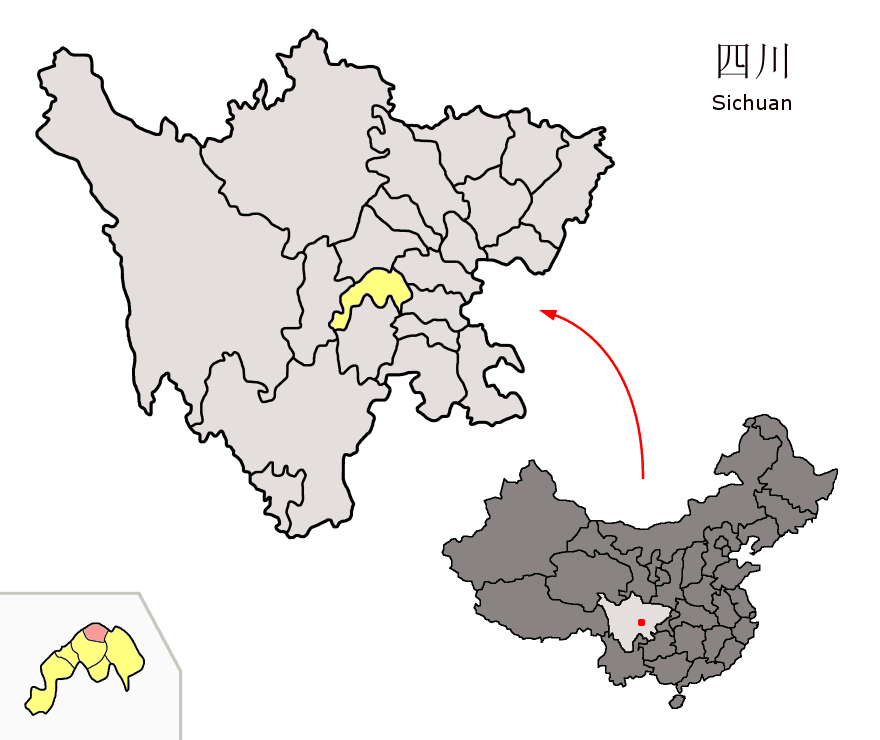
- Location of Pengshan (red) within Meishan City (yellow) and Sichuan
- Country: China
- Province: Sichuan
- Prefecture-level city: Meishan

Area
  - District: 465 km^{2} (180 sq mi)

Population (2020 census)
  - District: 328,236
  - Density: 706/km^{2} (1,830/sq mi)
  - Urban: 189,320
- Time zone: UTC+8 (China Standard)
- Postal code: 612700

Pengshan District (Chinese: 彭山区; pinyin: Péngshān Qū) is a district of the city of Meishan, Sichuan Province, China.

== Administrative divisions ==
Pengshan District comprises 5 subdistricts and 3 towns:

subdistricts

- Fengming 凤鸣街道
- Qinglong 青龙街道
- Guanyin 观音街道
- Xiejia 谢家街道
- Jiangkou 江口街道

towns

- Jinjiang 锦江镇
- Gongyi 公义镇
- Huangfeng 黄丰镇

== Climate ==
Climate data for Pengshan, elevation 437 m (1,434 ft), (1991–2020 normals, extremes 1981–present)
Month	Jan	Feb	Mar	Apr	May	Jun	Jul	Aug	Sep	Oct	Nov	Dec	Year
Record high °C (°F)	20.1 (68.2)	24.7 (76.5)	32.8 (91.0)	33.4 (92.1)	36.2 (97.2)	36.9 (98.4)	40.6 (105.1)	40.2 (104.4)	36.8 (98.2)	30.2 (86.4)	26.0 (78.8)	18.6 (65.5)	40.6 (105.1)
Mean daily maximum °C (°F)	10.2 (50.4)	13.2 (55.8)	18.2 (64.8)	23.9 (75.0)	27.6 (81.7)	29.4 (84.9)	31.3 (88.3)	31.1 (88.0)	26.6 (79.9)	21.6 (70.9)	17.0 (62.6)	11.5 (52.7)	21.8 (71.3)
Daily mean °C (°F)	7.0 (44.6)	9.5 (49.1)	13.7 (56.7)	18.9 (66.0)	22.7 (72.9)	25.0 (77.0)	26.7 (80.1)	26.4 (79.5)	22.8 (73.0)	18.3 (64.9)	13.7 (56.7)	8.5 (47.3)	17.8 (64.0)
Mean daily minimum °C (°F)	4.6 (40.3)	6.9 (44.4)	10.6 (51.1)	15.2 (59.4)	19.0 (66.2)	21.8 (71.2)	23.5 (74.3)	23.2 (73.8)	20.2 (68.4)	16.1 (61.0)	11.5 (52.7)	6.3 (43.3)	14.9 (58.8)
Record low °C (°F)	−3.2 (26.2)	−1.4 (29.5)	−1.0 (30.2)	5.9 (42.6)	8.9 (48.0)	15.2 (59.4)	17.7 (63.9)	16.5 (61.7)	13.9 (57.0)	5.0 (41.0)	2.3 (36.1)	−2.9 (26.8)	−3.2 (26.2)
Average precipitation mm (inches)	9.9 (0.39)	14.6 (0.57)	27.5 (1.08)	52.9 (2.08)	91.9 (3.62)	132.4 (5.21)	197.0 (7.76)	224.8 (8.85)	113.4 (4.46)	45.2 (1.78)	15.8 (0.62)	8.5 (0.33)	933.9 (36.75)
Average precipitation days (≥ 0.1 mm)	7.9	8.4	11.0	12.8	14.2	15.9	16.3	14.9	15.2	14.4	8.1	6.9	146
Average snowy days	0.7	0.3	0	0	0	0	0	0	0	0	0	0.2	1.2
Average relative humidity (%)	80	76	72	71	69	75	78	78	80	81	80	80	77
Mean monthly sunshine hours	40.6	58.3	95.4	126.9	133.3	117.3	138.2	150.9	79.9	61.4	59.0	45.2	1,106.4
Percentage possible sunshine	13	18	26	33	31	28	32	37	22	18	19	14	24
Source: China Meteorological Administration all-time extreme temperature all-time January highall-time July High
