= Xiaolian =

Historical Chinese civil service nomination process

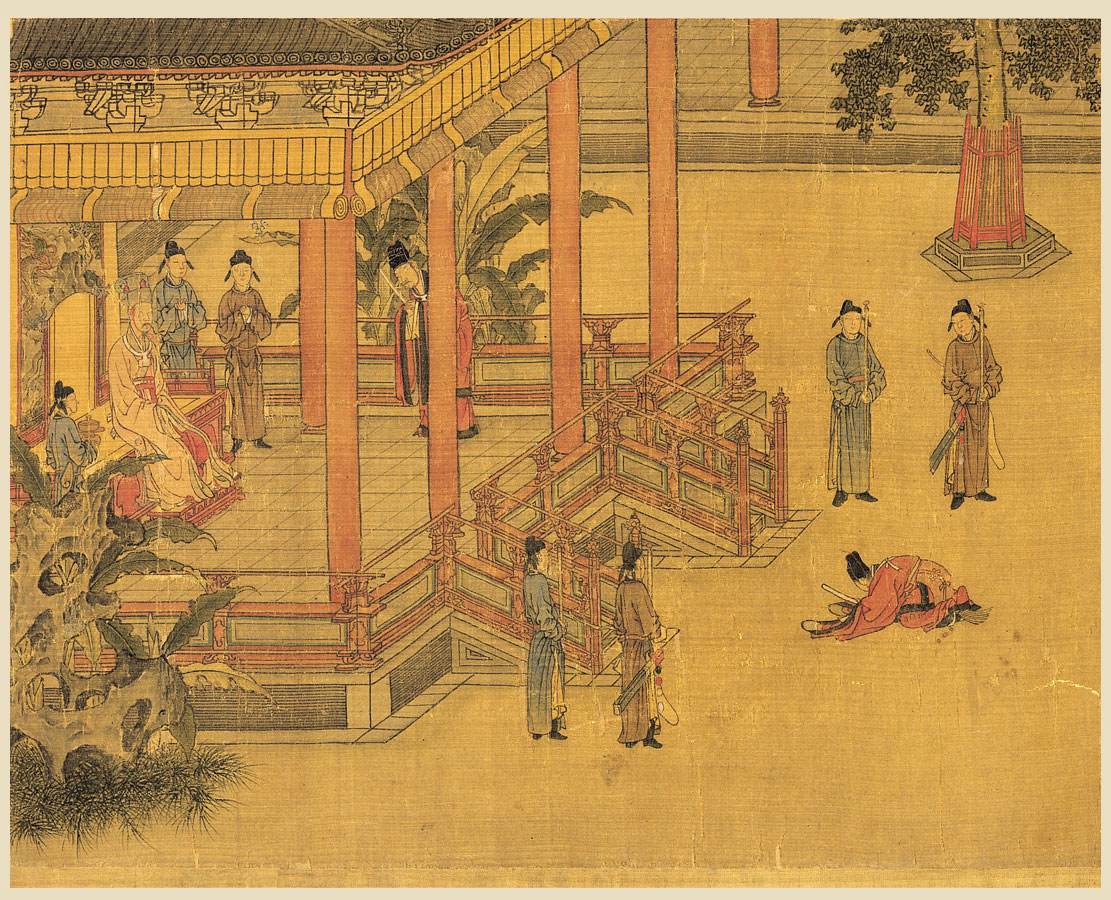
- Scene from Illustrations of the Classic of Filial Piety, depicting an official kneeling before his sovereign.
- Chinese: 孝廉
- Literal meaning: filial and incorrupt
Transcriptions
Standard Mandarin
- Hanyu Pinyin: xiàolián
- Wade–Giles: hsiao-lien

Xiaolian was the standard of nominating civil officers started by the Wu Emperor of the Han in 134 BC. It lasted until its replacement by the imperial examination system during the Sui dynasty.

In the Confucian philosophy adopted by the Han in opposition to their Legalist Qin predecessors, filial piety is the fundamental virtue. Endless gratitude and respect for one's parents and ancestors, properly expressed, were considered to inculcate proper personal, social, and political virtues as well.

Under the advice of Dong Zhongshu, Emperor Wu ordered each commandery to recommend one filial and one incorrupt candidate for civil offices. Later the nomination became proportional. The He Emperor of the Han changed the proportion to one candidate for every 200,000 residents in most areas of the empire and one for every 100,000 residents in non-Sinicized regions. The nominator was liable for punishment both if his nominees were charged with corruption and if he failed to provide nominations.

After the Han dynasty, high positions were usually nominated according to the nine-rank system, so xiaolian became increasingly unimportant. During the Sui dynasty, both systems were replaced by the imperial examination system.

== See also ==
- Imperial examination & Gaokao
- Filial piety
- Corruption in China
