= Guanghan =

Guanghan 广汉市
- County-level city
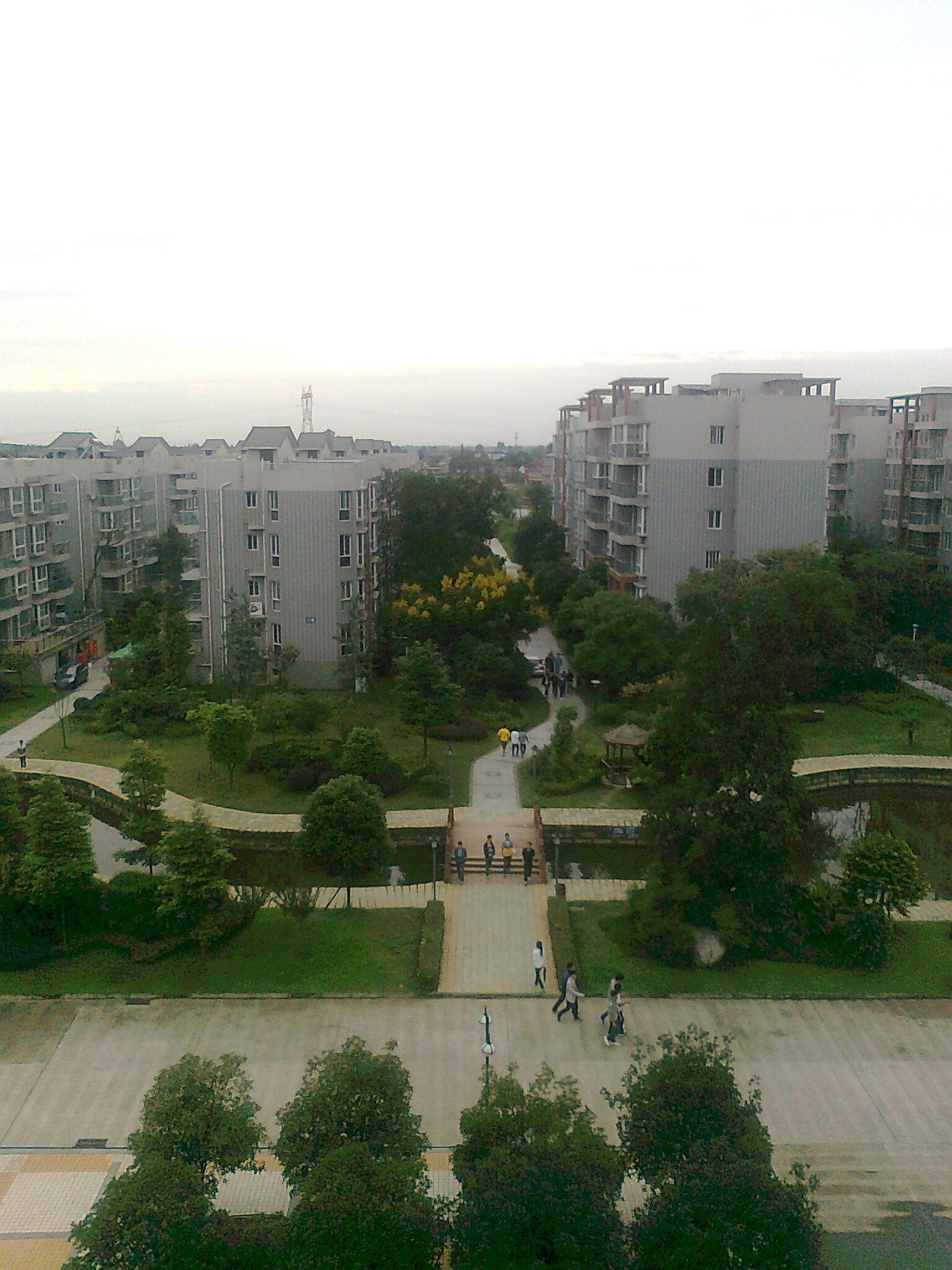

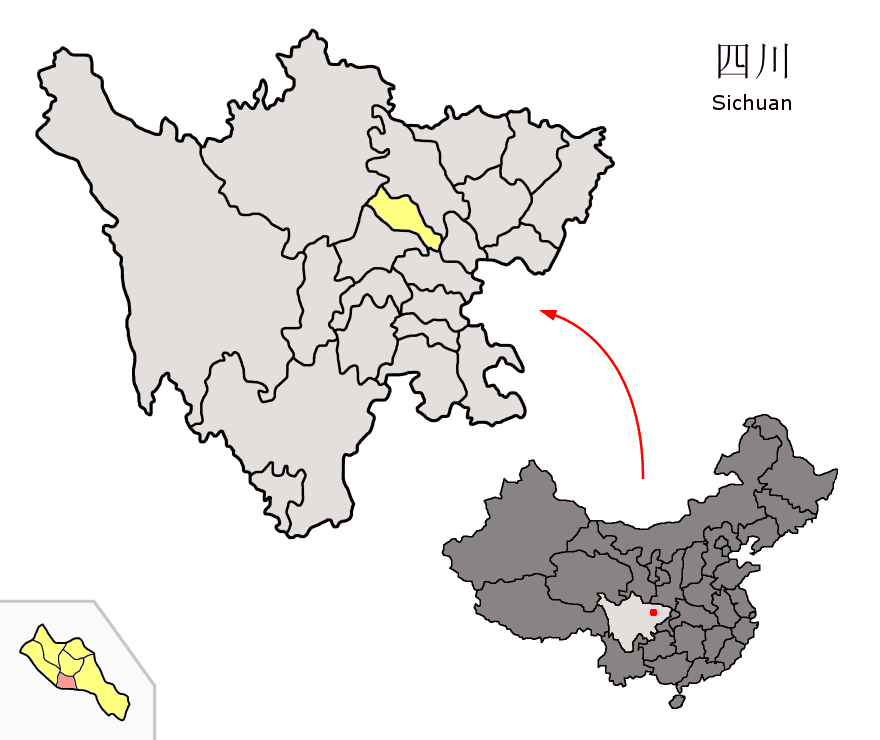
- Location of Guanghan within Deyang, Sichuan

- Location in Sichuan
- Coordinates: 30°59′24″N 104°15′0″E
- Country: China
- Province: Sichuan
- Prefecture-level city: Deyang
- Municipal seat: Luocheng Subdistrict

Area
  - County-level city: 538 km^{2} (208 sq mi)

Population (2020 census)
  - County-level city: 626,132
  - Density: 1,160/km^{2} (3,010/sq mi)
  - Urban: 368,933
- Time zone: UTC+8 (China Standard)
- Postal code: 618300
- Area code: 0838
- Website: www.guanghan.gov.cn

Guanghan (simplified Chinese: 广汉; traditional Chinese: 廣漢; pinyin: Guǎnghàn; formerly known as Hanchow) is a county-level city under the administration of Deyang in Sichuan province, southwest China, and only 23 kilometres (14 miles) from Chengdu. The predominant industries are tourism, pharmaceuticals and the supply of building material.

Guanghan has an area of 538 km^{2} (208 sq mi), a population of 626,132, with urban population of 368,933. A major part of the tourism is the nearby Sanxingdui ruins. The striking exhibits at the Sanxingdui Museum highlight archaeological finds that some archaeologists regard as even more important than the Terracotta Army.

The region is steadily becoming more industrialised and that is helping with the progression of agriculture and enhances the region's development.

== Administrative divisions ==
Guanghan comprises 3 subdistricts and 9 towns:

Subdistricts

- Luocheng 雒城街道
- Hanzhou 汉州街道
- Jinyan 金雁街道

Towns

- Sanshui 三水镇
- Lianshan 连山镇
- Gaoping 高坪镇
- Xiangyang 向阳镇
- Xiaohan 小汉镇
- Jinlun 金轮镇
- Jinyu 金鱼镇
- Nanfeng 南丰镇
- Sanxingdui 三星堆镇

== Education ==
Civil Aviation Flight University of China (CAFUC) is famous for educating the dominant majority of Chinese civil aviation pilots and air traffic controllers.

Universities and colleges include:

- Civil Aviation Flight University of China
- Sichuan Normal University (Guanghan)
- Sichuan Aerospace Polytechnic
- National Judges College (Sichuan)

== Climate ==
Climate data for Guanghan, elevation 468 m (1,535 ft), (1991–2020 normals, extremes 1991–present)
| Month | Jan | Feb | Mar | Apr | May | Jun | Jul | Aug | Sep | Oct | Nov | Dec | Year |
|---|---|---|---|---|---|---|---|---|---|---|---|---|---|
| Record high °C (°F) | 19.8 (67.6) | 23.7 (74.7) | 32.0 (89.6) | 35.1 (95.2) | 37.2 (99.0) | 37.1 (98.8) | 39.7 (103.5) | 41.1 (106.0) | 36.5 (97.7) | 31.9 (89.4) | 25.9 (78.6) | 18.8 (65.8) | 41.1 (106.0) |
| Mean daily maximum °C (°F) | 9.7 (49.5) | 12.6 (54.7) | 17.5 (63.5) | 23.4 (74.1) | 27.3 (81.1) | 29.1 (84.4) | 30.7 (87.3) | 30.6 (87.1) | 26.3 (79.3) | 21.3 (70.3) | 16.6 (61.9) | 11.1 (52.0) | 21.3 (70.4) |
| Daily mean °C (°F) | 6.1 (43.0) | 8.7 (47.7) | 12.9 (55.2) | 18.1 (64.6) | 22.2 (72.0) | 24.7 (76.5) | 26.3 (79.3) | 25.9 (78.6) | 22.3 (72.1) | 17.7 (63.9) | 12.9 (55.2) | 7.6 (45.7) | 17.1 (62.8) |
| Mean daily minimum °C (°F) | 3.3 (37.9) | 5.7 (42.3) | 9.5 (49.1) | 14.0 (57.2) | 18.1 (64.6) | 21.3 (70.3) | 23.0 (73.4) | 22.5 (72.5) | 19.6 (67.3) | 15.3 (59.5) | 10.3 (50.5) | 4.9 (40.8) | 14.0 (57.1) |
| Record low °C (°F) | −4.4 (24.1) | −2.1 (28.2) | 0.8 (33.4) | 5.0 (41.0) | 7.5 (45.5) | 14.7 (58.5) | 18.3 (64.9) | 16.1 (61.0) | 13.6 (56.5) | 7.2 (45.0) | 0.8 (33.4) | −3.7 (25.3) | −4.4 (24.1) |
| Average precipitation mm (inches) | 6.7 (0.26) | 8.5 (0.33) | 17.9 (0.70) | 41.6 (1.64) | 66.2 (2.61) | 103.8 (4.09) | 186.5 (7.34) | 176.6 (6.95) | 114.2 (4.50) | 36.2 (1.43) | 10.9 (0.43) | 4.7 (0.19) | 773.8 (30.47) |
| Average precipitation days (≥ 0.1 mm) | 6.3 | 6.7 | 9.6 | 11.8 | 13.1 | 14.7 | 15.1 | 13.8 | 15.0 | 13.1 | 6.1 | 4.3 | 129.6 |
| Average snowy days | 1.0 | 0.4 | 0 | 0 | 0 | 0 | 0 | 0 | 0 | 0 | 0 | 0.2 | 1.6 |
| Average relative humidity (%) | 80 | 77 | 74 | 72 | 69 | 77 | 82 | 82 | 82 | 82 | 80 | 80 | 78 |
| Mean monthly sunshine hours | 50.8 | 60.4 | 88.9 | 123.7 | 132.2 | 118.5 | 135.6 | 143.4 | 76.2 | 56.9 | 56.4 | 51.8 | 1,094.8 |
| Percentage possible sunshine | 16 | 19 | 24 | 32 | 31 | 28 | 32 | 35 | 21 | 16 | 18 | 17 | 24 |
Source: China Meteorological Administration all-time extreme temperature all-time January highall-time July High
