= Chang Qu =

Chinese historian (291–361)

- 常璩
- Statue of Chang Qu

Cavalier In Regular Attendance (散騎常侍)
- In office ? – 347
- Monarch: Li Shi

Personal details
- Born: 291 Chengdu, Shu Commandery, Yizhou, Western Jin
- Died: 361 (aged 70) Yizhou, Eastern Jin
- Relations: Chang Xu (relative); Chang Ji (relative); Chang Kuan (relative) (Note: Chang Kuan (常寬) has his own biography in Volume 11 of the Huayang Guo Zhi.)
- Occupation: Historian
- Courtesy name: Daojiang (道將)

Chang Qu (291–361), courtesy name Daojiang, was a Chinese historian of the Cheng-Han dynasty during the Sixteen Kingdoms period and the Jin dynasty (266–420). Chang Qu is best known for his magnum opus, the Chronicles of Huayang or Records of the States South of Mount Hua that he compiled between 348 and 354, the oldest extant regional history of China about his native region of Yizhou, or the modern-day Sichuan province and Chongqing municipality.

== Life ==
Chang Qu was born in Jiangyuan, Shu Commandery, which is in present-day Chengdu, Sichuan during the Jin dynasty. The Chang of Jiangyuan were a prominent clan producing many scholars and masters of the prose who enjoyed writing and high credit. At the start of the 4th century, due to a peasant uprising in the Shu region, local nobles led their followers and retainers to migrate far away. The Chang clan, led by Chang Kuan (traditional Chinese: 常寬; simplified Chinese: 常宽), went east to Jing and Xiang Province, following the path of Du Tao and others. At this time, Chang Qu was still a child, born from a minor and poor branch of the Chang clan. Therefore his household was unable to migrate. They joined another clan and took refuge with Fan Changsheng of Qingcheng to survive. Later, they received the protection of Li Xiong.

After Li Xiong gained control of Liang and Yi, he greatly promoted education and culture. The Shu region was peaceful at the time, the harvest was abundant and taxes were light. Chang Qu, as a remnant of the Chang ancient and noble family grew up in this stable environment, having the chance to read widely among the books left by his ancestors and took great pride in his literary abilities.

Meanwhile, the Shu people who had migrated to Jing and Xiang were ruled by Du Tao, who had established control over the region. Chang Kuan led the Chang clan to escape via the region of Jiaozhi. When Li Xiong conquered Ningzhou, (Note: Nanzhong was also called Ningzhou or Ning Province (寧州).) he summoned back the displaced people. The Shu people who had migrated to Jiaozhi, Nanzhong and Jing/Xiang gradually returned, including members of the Chang. At this time, Chang Qu was starting his official career and the newly returned Chang relatives all relied on him.

Chang Qu was studious and curious, among the returned migrants many had knowledge of far-off places and tales of turmoil. With this wealth of information, Chang Qu wrote extensively. During the reigns of Li Qi and Li Shou, Chang Qu continued to serve as a historian. He used the maps and records from the time of Li Xiong to write the Geographical Records of the Three States of Liang, Yi and Ning (Note: Geographical Records of the Three States of Liang, Yi and Ning (梁益寧三州地志; 梁益宁三州地志)) and the Book of Shu Han (Note: Book of Shu Han (蜀漢書; 蜀汉书)). Li Shou had cut off connections with the regions south of the Yangtze River but still had contacts with the north, as a result, Chang Qu's books were among the first to circulate in the Yellow River region.

During the reign of Li Shi, Chang Qu served as Cavalier in Regular Attendance, he respected the views of Gong Zhuang of Baxi and favored the regions south of the Yangtze River. In the third year of the Yonghe era of the reign of Emperor Mu of Jin (347), when Huan Wen invaded Shu and his army reached Chengdu, Chang Qu, along with the Supervisor of the Palace Writers Wang Gu, advised Li Shi to surrender to Jin, (Note: Sun Sheng accompanied Huan on the expedition; it is unknown if he met Chang.) and then moved with him to Jiankang. The people of the south of the Yangtze River valued the old families of the Central Plains and looked down on the people of Shu. At this time, Chang Qu was already old and filled with indignation. He stopped pursuing further official positions, revised his previous works and compiled them into the Chronicles of Huayang.

The main purpose of his work was to promote the long history of the Ba and Shu regions, to describe their historical figures as to reaffirm their own culture over the hegemony of the Central Plains and northern people while resisting the criticisms from other southern regions. Because the materials were unprocessed, the narrative was legitimated and the writing was elegant and concise. During his time, it received praises from scholars and erudites rendering it popular among his contemporaries. Since then, it has been adopted as the model to follow by regional historians for a thousand years.
