= List of people of the Three Kingdoms (C) =

The following is a partial list of people significant to the Three Kingdoms period (220–280) of Chinese history. Their romanised names start with the letter C.

== C ==
Name	Courtesy name	Birth year	Death year	Ancestral home (present-day location)	Role	Allegiance	Previous allegiance(s)	Notes
Lady Cai 蔡氏				Xiangyang (Xiangyang, Hubei)	Noble lady		Liu Biao	Houhanshu vol. 74; Sanguozhi vol. 6.
Cai Fang 蔡方					Rebel leader, general		Cao Wei	
Cai Feng 蔡諷				Xiangyang (Xiangyang, Hubei)		Han dynasty		
Cai Gong 蔡貢					General	Eastern Wu		
Cai Ji 蔡機				Pengcheng (Xuzhou, Jiangsu)	Politician	Eastern Wu		
Cai Kuan 蔡款	Wende 文德			Pengcheng (Xuzhou, Jiangsu)	Politician	Eastern Wu		
Cai Lin 蔡林					General	Cao Wei	Eastern Wu	
Cai Mao 蔡瑁	Degui 德珪			Xiangyang (Xiangyang, Hubei)	General	Cao Cao	Liu Biao	Houhanshu vol. 74; Sanguozhi vol. 6.
Cai Tiao 蔡條				Pengcheng (Xuzhou, Jiangsu)	Politician	Eastern Wu		
Cai Wenzhi 蔡文至						Eastern Wu		
Cai Yan 蔡琰	Zhaoji / Wenji 昭姬 / 文姬	177		Yu, Chenliu (South of Qi County, Henan)	Musician, poet			Houhanshu vol. 84.
Cai Yang 蔡阳			201		General	Cao Cao		
Cai Yi 蔡遺					Politician	Eastern Wu		
Cai Ying 蔡穎					Servant	Eastern Wu		
Cai Yong 蔡邕	Bojie 伯喈	132	192	Yu, Chenliu (South of Qi County, Henan)	Astronomer, calligrapher, mathematician, musician, politician, scholar	Dong Zhuo	Han dynasty	Houhanshu vol. 60.
Cai Yuancai 蔡元才								
Cang Ci 倉慈	Xiaoren 孝仁	174	240	Huainan	Politician	Cao Wei		Sanguozhi vol. 16.
Lady Cao 曹				Qiao County, Pei (Bozhou, Anhui)	Noble Lady, Princess, Wife of Xiahou Mao	Cao Wei		
Cao Ai 曹皚				Qiao County, Pei (Bozhou, Anhui)	Politician	Cao Wei		
Cao Ang 曹昂	Zixiu 子脩		197	Qiao County, Pei (Bozhou, Anhui)	Noble	Cao Cao		Sanguozhi vol. 20. See also Cao Wei family trees.
Cao Anmin 曹安民			197	Qiao County, Pei (Bozhou, Anhui)	Noble	Cao Cao		See Cao Wei family trees.
Cao Bao 曹豹			196		General	Lü Bu	Tao Qian, Liu Bei	Yingxiong Ji annotation in Sanguozhi vol. 7; Yingxiong Ji annotation in Sanguozhi vol. 32.
Cao Biao 曹彪	Zhuhu 朱虎	195	251	Qiao County, Pei (Bozhou, Anhui)	Noble	Cao Wei		Sanguozhi vol. 20. See also Cao Wei family trees.
Cao Bin 曹彬				Qiao County, Pei (Bozhou, Anhui)	Politician	Cao Wei		Cao Zhen's brother
Cao Buxing 曹不興				Wuxing (Huzhou, Zhejiang)	Artist			Sanguozhi vol. 63.
Cao Cao 曹操	Mengde 孟德	155	220	Qiao County, Pei (Bozhou, Anhui)	General, poet, politician, warlord	Cao Cao	Han dynasty	Sanguozhi vol. 1. See also Cao Wei family trees.
Cao Chi 曹熾				Qiao County, Pei (Bozhou, Anhui)	Politician	Han dynasty		
Cao Chong 曹沖	Cangshu 倉舒	196	208	Qiao County, Pei (Bozhou, Anhui)	Noble	Cao Cao		Sanguozhi vol. 20. See also Cao Wei family trees.
Cao Chu 曹初				Qiao County, Pei (Bozhou, Anhui)	Politician	Cao Wei		
Cao Chun 曹純	Zihe 子和		210	Qiao County, Pei (Bozhou, Anhui)	General	Cao Cao		Sanguozhi vol. 9.
Cao Ding 曹鼎				Qiao County, Pei (Bozhou, Anhui)	Politician	Han dynasty		
Cao Fan 曹範			235	Qiao County, Pei (Bozhou, Anhui)	Politician	Cao Wei		
Cao Fan 曹璠					Politician	Cao Wei		
Cao Fang 曹芳	Lanqing 蘭卿	231	274	Qiao County, Pei (Bozhou, Anhui)	Emperor	Cao Wei		Sanguozhi vol. 4. See also Cao Wei family trees.
Cao Fu 曹輔						Eastern Wu		
Cao Fu 曹馥				Qiao County, Pei (Bozhou, Anhui)	General	Cao Wei		
Cao Gan 曹幹		216	261	Qiao County, Pei (Bozhou, Anhui)	Noble	Cao Wei		Sanguozhi vol. 20. See also Cao Wei family trees.
Cao Gong 曹貢			223	Qiao County, Pei (Bozhou, Anhui)	Noble	Cao Wei		Sanguozhi vol. 20. See also Cao Wei family trees.
Cao Gun 曹袞			235	Qiao County, Pei (Bozhou, Anhui)	Noble	Cao Wei		Sanguozhi vol. 20. See also Cao Wei family trees.
Cao Hong 曹洪	Zilian 子廉		232	Qiao County, Pei (Bozhou, Anhui)	General	Cao Wei		Sanguozhi vol. 9.
Cao Hong 曹宏					Politician	Tao Qian		
Cao Huan 曹奐	Jingming 景明	246	302	Qiao County, Pei (Bozhou, Anhui)	Emperor	Cao Wei		Sanguozhi vol. 4. See also Cao Wei family trees.
Cao Hui 曹徽			241	Qiao County, Pei (Bozhou, Anhui)	Noble	Cao Wei		Sanguozhi vol. 20. See also Cao Wei family trees.
Cao Jian 曹鑒			224	Qiao County, Pei (Bozhou, Anhui)	Noble	Cao Wei		Sanguozhi vol. 20. See also Cao Wei family trees.
Cao Jie 曹節			260	Qiao County, Pei (Bozhou, Anhui)	Empress	Han dynasty		Houhanshu vol. 9, 10.
Cao Jie 曹節	Hanfeng 漢豐		181		Eunuch	Han dynasty		Houhanshu vol. 78.
Cao Jiong 曹冏	Yuanshou 元首			Qiao County, Pei (Bozhou, Anhui)	Politician	Cao Wei		
Cao Ju 曹矩				Qiao County, Pei (Bozhou, Anhui)	Noble	Cao Wei		Sanguozhi vol. 20. See also Cao Wei family trees.
Cao Ju 曹據				Qiao County, Pei (Bozhou, Anhui)	Noble	Cao Wei		Sanguozhi vol. 20. See also Cao Wei family trees.
Cao Jun 曹均			219	Qiao County, Pei (Bozhou, Anhui)	Noble	Cao Wei		Sanguozhi vol. 20. See also Cao Wei family trees.
Cao Jun 曹峻	Zi'an 子安		259	Qiao County, Pei (Bozhou, Anhui)	Noble	Cao Wei		Sanguozhi vol. 20. See also Cao Wei family trees.
Cao Kai 曹楷				Qiao County, Pei (Bozhou, Anhui)	Noble	Jin dynasty	Cao Wei	
Cao Kun 曹琨				Qiao County, Pei (Bozhou, Anhui)	Politician	Jin dynasty	Cao Xi's son	
Cao Lian 曹廉				Qiao County, Pei (Bozhou, Anhui)	Noble	Cao Wei		Sanguozhi vol. 20.
Cao Li 曹禮			229	Qiao County, Pei (Bozhou, Anhui)	Noble	Cao Wei		Sanguozhi vol. 20. See also Cao Wei family trees.
Cao Liang 曹亮				Qiao County, Pei (Bozhou, Anhui)		Cao Wei		
Cao Lin 曹霖			250	Qiao County, Pei (Bozhou, Anhui)	Noble	Cao Wei		Sanguozhi vol. 20. See also Cao Wei family trees.
Cao Lin 曹林			256	Qiao County, Pei (Bozhou, Anhui)	Noble	Cao Wei		Sanguozhi vol. 20. See also Cao Wei family trees.
Cao Mao 曹髦	Yanshi 彥士	241	260	Qiao County, Pei (Bozhou, Anhui)	Emperor	Cao Wei		Sanguozhi vol. 4. See also Cao Wei family trees.
Cao Mao 曹茂				Qiao County, Pei (Bozhou, Anhui)	Noble	Cao Wei		Sanguozhi vol. 20. See also Cao Wei family trees.
Cao Pi 曹丕	Zihuan 子桓	187	226	Qiao County, Pei (Bozhou, Anhui)	Emperor	Cao Wei		Sanguozhi vol. 2. See also Cao Wei family trees.
Cao Qian 曹潛			233	Qiao County, Pei (Bozhou, Anhui)	Noble	Cao Wei		
Cao Ren 曹仁	Zixiao 子孝	168	223	Qiao County, Pei (Bozhou, Anhui)	General	Cao Wei		Sanguozhi vol. 9.
Cao Rui 曹叡	Yuanzhong 元仲	205	239	Qiao County, Pei (Bozhou, Anhui)	Emperor	Cao Wei		Sanguozhi vol. 3. See also Cao Wei family trees.
Cao Rui 曹蕤			233	Qiao County, Pei (Bozhou, Anhui)	Noble	Cao Wei		Sanguozhi vol. 20. See also Cao Wei family trees.
Cao Shao 曹邵	Bo'nan 伯南			Qiao County, Pei (Bozhou, Anhui)	General	Cao Cao		
Cao Shao 曹紹				Qiao County, Pei (Bozhou, Anhui)	Politician	Cao Cao		
Cao Shuang 曹爽	Zhaobo 昭伯		249	Qiao County, Pei (Bozhou, Anhui)	General, politician, regent	Cao Wei		Sanguozhi vol. 9.
Cao Shuo 曹鑠				Qiao County, Pei (Bozhou, Anhui)	Noble	Cao Wei		Sanguozhi vol. 20. See also Cao Wei family trees.
Cao Song 曹嵩	Jugao 巨高		193	Qiao County, Pei (Bozhou, Anhui)	Politician	Han dynasty		Houhanshu vol. 78; Sanguozhi vol. 1.
Cao Tai 曹泰				Qiao County, Pei (Bozhou, Anhui)	General	Cao Wei		
Cao Teng 曹騰	Jixing 季興			Qiao County, Pei (Bozhou, Anhui)	Eunuch	Han dynasty		Houhanshu vol. 78.
Cao Wan 曹琬				Qiao County, Pei (Bozhou, Anhui)	Noble	Cao Wei		Sanguozhi vol. 20.
Cao Wei 曹偉				Shanyang, Henai (Jiaozuo, Henan)	Politician	Cao Wei		
Cao Wenshu 曹文叔				Qiao County, Pei (Bozhou, Anhui)		Cao Wei		
Cao Xi 曹羲			249	Qiao County, Pei (Bozhou, Anhui)	General, politician	Cao Wei		
Cao Xi 曹熙				Qiao County, Pei (Bozhou, Anhui)	Politician	Cao Wei		
Cao Xie 曹協				Qiao County, Pei (Bozhou, Anhui)	Noble	Cao Wei		Sanguozhi vol. 20. See also Cao Wei family trees.
Cao Xing 曹性					General	Lü Bu		Yingxiong Ji annotation in Sanguozhi vol. 7.
Cao Xing 曹興				Qiao County, Pei (Bozhou, Anhui)	Politician	Cao Wei		
Cao Xiong 曹熊				Qiao County, Pei (Bozhou, Anhui)	Noble	Cao Wei		Sanguozhi vol. 19. See also Cao Wei family trees.
Cao Xiu 曹休	Wenlie 文烈		228	Qiao County, Pei (Bozhou, Anhui)	General	Cao Wei		Sanguozhi vol. 9.
Cao Xuan 曹玹				Qiao County, Pei (Bozhou, Anhui)	Noble	Cao Wei		Sanguozhi vol. 20. See also Cao Wei family trees.
Cao Xun 曹訓			249	Qiao County, Pei (Bozhou, Anhui)	General, politician	Cao Wei		
Cao Yan 曹儼			223	Qiao County, Pei (Bozhou, Anhui)	Noble	Cao Wei		Sanguozhi vol. 20. See also Cao Wei family trees.
Cao Yan 曹演				Qiao County, Pei (Bozhou, Anhui)	General	Cao Wei		
Cao Yan 曹彥			249	Qiao County, Pei (Bozhou, Anhui)	General	Cao Wei		
Cao Yan 曹兗				Qiao County, Pei (Bozhou, Anhui)	Noble	Cao Wei		
Cao Yin 曹寅					Politician	Han dynasty		
Cao Yong 曹邕			229	Qiao County, Pei (Bozhou, Anhui)	Noble	Cao Wei		Sanguozhi vol. 20. See also Cao Wei family trees.
Cao Yu 曹宇	Pengzu 彭祖			Qiao County, Pei (Bozhou, Anhui)	Noble	Cao Wei		Sanguozhi vol. 20. See also Cao Wei family trees.
Cao Yu 曹玉				Qiao County, Pei (Bozhou, Anhui)	Politician	Han dynasty		
Cao Yu 曹瑜				Qiao County, Pei (Bozhou, Anhui)	General	Han dynasty		
Cao Ze 曹則			249	Qiao County, Pei (Bozhou, Anhui)	Politician	Cao Wei		
Cao Zhang 曹彰	Ziwen 子文		223	Qiao County, Pei (Bozhou, Anhui)	General, noble	Cao Wei		Sanguozhi vol. 19. See also Cao Wei family trees.
Cao Zhao 曹肇	Changsi 長思		244	Qiao County, Pei (Bozhou, Anhui)	General	Cao Wei		
Cao Zhen 曹真	Zidan 子丹		231	Qiao County, Pei (Bozhou, Anhui)	General	Cao Wei		Sanguozhi vol. 9.
Cao Zhen 曹震				Qiao County, Pei (Bozhou, Anhui)	Politician	Cao Wei		
Cao Zhen 曹珍					General	Cao Wei		
Cao Zhi 曹植	Zijian 子建	192	232	Qiao County, Pei (Bozhou, Anhui)	Noble, poet	Cao Wei		Sanguozhi vol. 19. See also Cao Wei family trees.
Cao Zicheng 曹子乘				Qiao County, Pei (Bozhou, Anhui)	Noble	Cao Wei		Sanguozhi vol. 20. See also Cao Wei family trees.
Cao Ziji 曹子棘				Qiao County, Pei (Bozhou, Anhui)	Noble	Cao Wei		Sanguozhi vol. 20. See also Cao Wei family trees.
Cao Zijing 曹子京				Qiao County, Pei (Bozhou, Anhui)	Noble	Cao Wei		Sanguozhi vol. 20. See also Cao Wei family trees.
Cao Ziqin 曹子勤				Qiao County, Pei (Bozhou, Anhui)	Noble	Cao Wei		Sanguozhi vol. 20. See also Cao Wei family trees.
Cao Zishang 曹子上				Qiao County, Pei (Bozhou, Anhui)	Noble	Cao Wei		Sanguozhi vol. 20. See also Cao Wei family trees.
Cao Zizheng 曹子整			218	Qiao County, Pei (Bozhou, Anhui)	Noble	Cao Wei		Sanguozhi vol. 20. See also Cao Wei family trees.
Cao Zuan 曹纂				Qiao County, Pei (Bozhou, Anhui)	General	Cao Wei		
Cao Zun 曹遵				Qiao County, Pei (Bozhou, Anhui)	General	Cao Wei		
Cen Hun 岑昏			280	Nanyang County (Nanyang, Henan)	Politician	Eastern Wu		Sanguozhi vol. 48.
Cen Ke 岑軻				Nanyang County (Nanyang, Henan)	Politician	Eastern Wu		New Book of Tang vol. 72.
Cen Shu 岑述	Yuanjian 元儉				General	Shu Han		
Cen Zhi 岑晊	Gongxiao 公孝			Nanyang County (Nanyang, Henan)	Politician	Han dynasty		
Chai Yu 柴玉					Musical instrument technician	Cao Wei		
Chang Bo 常播	Weiping 文平			Shu County, Jiangyuan (Chongzhou, Jiangyuan, Sichuan)	Politician	Shu Han		
Chang Boxian 常伯先				Wen County, Henei (Wen County, Henan)		Han dynasty		
Chang Diao 常雕			222		General	Cao Wei		
Chang Fang 常房			223		Politician	Shu Han		
Chang Ji 常忌	Maotong 茂通			Shu County (Chengdu, Sichuan)	Politician	Jin dynasty	Shu Han	Huayang Guo Zhi vol. 11. 05.
Chang Jing 常靜				Wen County, Henei (Wen County, Henan)	Politician	Cao Wei		
Chang Ju 常俱					Rebel leader			
Chang Lin 常林	Bohuai 伯槐		223	Wen County, Henei (Wen County, Henan)	Politician	Cao Wei	Han dynasty	Sanguozhi vol. 23.
Chang Nu 萇奴					General	Yuan Shu		
Chang Qia 常洽	Maoni 茂尼				Politician	Han dynasty		
Chang Shi 常旹				Wen County, Henei (Wen County, Henan)	Politician	Cao Wei		
Chang Xi 昌豨		162	206		General, rebel leader	Cao Cao	Zang Ba, Lü Bu, Liu Bei	
Chang Xu 常勗	Xiuye 脩業		266	Jiangyuan, Shu County (Chengdu, Sichuan)	Politician	Jin dynasty	Shu Han	Huayang Guo Zhi vol. 11. 05.
Che Jun 車浚			276		Politician	Eastern Wu		
Che Zhou 車胄			200	Huayin, Hongnong (East of Huayin, Shaanxi)	General, politician	Cao Cao		
Lady Chen 陳氏					Liu Qi's mother	Liu Biao		
Chen Ao 陳敖				Songzi, Lujiang (Songzi, Hubei)	General	Eastern Wu		
Chen Bai 陳敗					Rebel leader	Yellow Turban rebels		
Chen Bao 陳寶					General	Sun Ce		
Chen Bi 陳毖			255	Lingling (Quanzhou County, Guangxi)	Rebel leader			
Chen Biao 陳表	Wen'ao 文奧	204	237	Songzi, Lujiang (Songzi, Hubei)	General	Eastern Wu		Sanguozhi vol. 55.
Chen Ben 陳本				Dongyang, Guangling (Huai'an, Xuyi County, Jiangsu)	Politician	Cao Wei		
Chen Can 陳粲				Dongyang, Guangling (Huai'an, Xuyi County, Jiangsu)	Politician	Cao Wei		
Chen Can 陳粲				Runan (Shangcai County, Henan)	Politician	Shu Han		
Chen Ce 陳策					Rebel leader			
Chen Chao 陳超					General	Han dynasty		
Chen Chen 陳諶	Jifang 季方			Xuchang (Xuchang, Henan)	Politician	Han dynasty		
Chen Cheng 陳承					Politician	Cao Wei		
Chen Chengyou 陳承祐					Politician	Jin dynasty		
Chen Chi 陳熾	Gongxi 公熙			Runan (Pingyu County, Henan)	General	Eastern Wu		
Chen Cong 陳琮	Gongyan 公琰			Huaipu, Xiapiguo (Lianshui County, Jiangsu)	Politician	Han dynasty		
Chen Dan 陳耽	Hangong 漢公		185	Donghai County (Tancheng County, Shandong)	Politician	Han dynasty		
Chen Dao 陳到	Shuzhi 叔至			Runan (Runan County, Henan)	General	Shu Han		Sanguozhi vol. 40, 45.
Chen Deng 陳登	Yuanlong 元龍			Xiapi (Pizhou, Jiangsu)	Advisor, politician	Cao Cao	Han dynasty, Tao Qian, Liu Bei, Lü Bu	Sanguozhi vol. 7.
Chen Di 陳袛	Fengzong 奉宗		258	Runan (Shangcai County, Henan)	General, politician	Shu Han		
Chen Duan 陳端	Zizheng 子正			Guangling (Yangzhou, Jiangsu)	Advisor	Sun Ce		
Chen Feng 陳鳳					General	Shu Han		
Chen Feng 陳奉					General	Eastern Wu		
Chen Fu 陳福					General	Han dynasty		
Chen Fu 陳符	Changxin 長信			Anhan County, Baxi (Nanchong, Sichuan)	Politician	Jin dynasty	Shu Han	
Chen Gong 陳宮	Gongtai 公台		198	Wuyang County, Dong (Shen County, Shandong)	Advisor, politician	Lü Bu	Cao Cao	Houhanshu vol. 65; Sanguozhi vol. 1, 10, 14.
Chen Gong 陳恭				Jiangxia (Wuhan, Hubei)	General	Han dynasty		
Chen Gui 陳珪	Hanyu 漢瑜			Xiapi (Pizhou, Jiangsu)	Advisor, politician	Cao Cao	Han dynasty, Tao Qian, Liu Bei, Lü Bu	Sanguozhi vol. 7.
Chen Hang 陳頏				Xiapi (Suining County, Jiangsu)	Musician	Cao Wei		
Chen He 陳郃				Jiangxia (Wuhan, Hubei)	General	Han dynasty		
Chen Hu 陳曶					General	Shu Han		
Chen Hua 陳化	Yuanyao 元耀			Runan (Pingyu County, Henan)	Politician	Eastern Wu		
Chen Ji 陳紀				Danyang (Xuancheng, Anhui)	General	Yuan Shu		
Chen Ji 陳紀	Yuanfang 元方			Xuchang (Xuchang, Henan)	Politician	Han dynasty		Houhanshu vol. 62; Sanguozhi vol. 22.
Chen Ji 陳濟				Nanyang (Nanyang, Henan)	Politician	Shu Han		
Chen Jiao 陳矯	Jibi 季弼		237	Dongyang, Guangling (Tianchang, Anhui)	Politician	Cao Wei		Sanguozhi vol. 22.
Chen Jiao 陳焦			261	Anwu, Danyang (Jing County, Anhui)		Eastern Wu		
Chen Jie 陳階	Dazhi 達之			Anhan County, Baxi (Nanchong, Sichuan)	Politician	Jin dynasty	Shu Han	
Chen Jiu 陳就					General	Liu Biao		
Chen Lan 陳蘭			209	Lujiang (Southwest of Lujiang County, Anhui)	General	Yuan Shu		Sanguozhi vol. 6, 17.
Chen Li 陳蒞	Shudu 叔度			Anhan County, Baxi (Nanchong, Sichuan)	Politician	Jin dynasty	Shu Han	
Chen Liangfu 陳梁甫					Calligrapher	Eastern Wu		
Chen Lin 陳琳	Kongzhang 孔璋		217	Yeyang, Guangling (Huai'an, Jiangsu)	Advisor, politician, scholar	Cao Cao	Han dynasty, Yuan Shao	Sanguozhi vol. 6.
Chen Mao 陳茂				Duyang, Nanyang (East of Fangcheng County, Henan)		Han dynasty		
Chen Miao 陳苗					Politician	Eastern Wu		
Chen Mu 陳牧					General	Han dynasty		
Chen Pu 陳僕				You, Danyang (Yi County, Anhui)	General	Han dynasty		
Chen Qian 陳騫	Xiuyuan 休淵	211	292	Dongyang, Linhuai (Tianchang, Anhui)	General	Jin dynasty	Cao Wei	Jin Shu vol. 35.
Chen Qian 陳遷					Politician	Eastern Wu		
Chen Qin 陳勤						Sun Quan		
Chen Qun 陳群	Changwen 長文		237	Xuchang, Yingchuan (Xuchang County, Henan)	Politician	Cao Wei	Liu Bei, Lü Bu	Sanguozhi vol. 22.
Chen Qun 陳群					General	Cao Wei		
Chen Rong 陳融				Chenguo (Huaiyang County, Henan)	Politician	Eastern Wu		
Chen Rong 陳容			195	Sheyang, Guangling (Baoying County, Jiangsu)	Politician	Zang Hong	Han dynasty	
Chen Shao 陳邵					General	Eastern Wu		
Chen Sheng 陳生				Jiangxia (Xinzhou District, Wuhan, Hubei)	General, rebel leader	Liu Biao		
Chen Sheng 陳聲			273		General, politician	Eastern Wu		
Chen Shi 陳式					General	Shu Han		
Chen Shi 陳寔	Zhonggong 仲弓	104	187	Xuchang (Xuchang, Henan)	Politician	Han dynasty		Houhanshu vol. 62.
Chen Shi 陳時					General, politician	Eastern Wu		
Chen Shou 陳壽	Chengzuo 承祚	233	297	Anhan County, Baxi (Nanchong, Sichuan)	Historian, politician	Jin dynasty	Shu Han	Huayang Guo Zhi vol. 11. 08; Jin Shu vol. 82.
Chen Shu 陳術	Shenbo 申伯			Hanzhong (Hanzhong, Shaanxi)	Scholar, politician	Shu Han		
Chen Shushan 陳叔山				Dongyang, Guangling (Xuyi County, Jiangsu)		Han dynasty		
Chen Su 陳肅				Huaipu, Xiapiguo (Lianshui County, Jiangsu)	Politician	Cao Wei		
Chen Tai 陳泰	Xuanbo 玄伯		260	Xuchang, Yingchuan (East of Xuchang County, Henan)	General, politician	Cao Wei		Sanguozhi vol. 22.
Chen Tao 陳桃					Politician	Han dynasty		
Chen Wei 陳煒					Politician	Han dynasty		
Chen Wen 陳溫	Yuanti 元悌			Runan (Shangcai County, Henan)	Politician	Han dynasty		
Chen Wen 陳溫				Xuchang, Yingchuan (Xuchang County, Henan)	Politician	Cao Wei		
Chen Wu 陳武	Zilie 子烈		215	Songzi, Lujiang (Songzi, Hubei)	General	Sun Quan		Sanguozhi vol. 55.
Chen Xiang 陳翔	Zhonglin 仲麟			Runan County (Pingyu County, Henan)		Han dynasty		
Chen Xiang 陳象			250		General	Eastern Wu		
Chen Xiu 陳脩		197	229	Songzi, Lujiang (Songzi, Hubei)	General	Eastern Wu		
Chen Xun 陳恂				Xuchang, Yingchuan (Xuchang County, Henan)	Politician	Cao Wei		
Chen Xun 陳恂					General	Eastern Wu		
Chen Xun 陳勳					General	Eastern Wu		
Chen Yan 陳延				Songzi, Lujiang (Songzi, Hubei)	General	Eastern Wu		
Chen Yan 陳延					Politician	Han dynasty		
Chen Yi 陳禕					General	Cao Wei		
Chen Yi 陳禕					Politician	Han dynasty		
Chen Yi 陳逸	Ziyou 子游			Pingyu, Runan(Pingyu County, Henan)		Han dynasty		
Chen Yi 陳懿			184		General	Han dynasty		
Chen Ying 陳應				Xiapi (Pizhou, Jiangsu)				
Chen Yong 陳永				Songzi, Lujiang (Songzi, Hubei)	General	Eastern Wu		
Chen Yu 陳瑀	Gongwei 公瑋			Xiapei, Huaipu (Lianshui County, Jiangsu)	General	Yuan Shao	Yuan Shu, Han dynasty	
Chen Yu 陳裕				Runan (Shangcai County, Henan)	Politician	Shu Han		
Chen Zhen 陳震	Xiaoqi 孝起		235	Nanyang (Nanyang, Henan)	Politician	Shu Han		Sanguozhi vol. 39.
Chen Zheng 陳正			250		General	Eastern Wu		
Chen Zhi 陳祗	Fengzong 奉宗		258	Runan, Henan (Pingyu County, Henan)	General, politician	Shu Han		Sanguozhi vol. 39.
Chen Zhishu 陳稚叔				Dingling, Yingchuan (Luohe, Henan)	Politician	Han dynasty		
Chen Zun 陳遵					Politician	Han dynasty		
Cheng Ang 程昂					Rebel leader, general		Cao Cao	
Cheng Bing 程秉	Deshu 德樞			Nandun, Runan (Nandun Town, Xiangcheng City, Henan)	Politician, scholar	Eastern Wu		Sanguozhi vol. 53.
Cheng Cui 成倅			260		General	Cao Wei		
Cheng Dang 成當					General	Sun Quan		
Cheng Fan 成藩					General	Shu Han		
Cheng Gong 承宮	Shaozi 少子			Langya (Linyi, Shandong)	General	Han dynasty		
Cheng He 成何					General	Cao Wei		
Cheng Hong 成弘					General	Cao Wei		
Cheng Huan 程奐					General	Han Fu		
Cheng Ji 成濟			260		General	Cao Wei		
Cheng Ji 程畿	Jiran 季然		222	Langzhong, Baxi (Langzhong, Sichuan)	General	Shu Han	Liu Zhang	
Cheng Jiu 成就					General	Han dynasty		
Cheng Ke 程克				Dong'a, Dong County (Yanggu County, Shandong)	Politician	Cao Wei		
Cheng Lian 成廉					General	Lü Bu		
Cheng Liang 程良				Dong'a, Dong County (Yanggu County, Shandong)	Politician	Cao Wei		
Cheng Pu 程普	Demou 德謀			Tuyin, Right Beiping (Fengrun District, Hebei)	General	Sun Quan		Sanguozhi vol. 55.
Cheng Qi 程祁	Gonghong 公弘			Langzhong, Baxi (Langzhong, Sichuan)		Shu Han		
Cheng Qiong 程瓊				Qianwei County (Qianwei County, Sichuan)	Politician	Shu Han		Huayang Guo Zhi vol. 11. 02.
Cheng Ta 程他				Dong County, Dunqiu (Xun County, Henan)				Refer to Hu Zhi (Wen De)
Cheng Wei 程威				Dong County (Puyang, Henan)	Politician	Cao Wei		
Cheng Wu 程武				Dong'e, Dong (Dong'e County, Liaocheng, Shandong)	Advisor, politician	Cao Wei		Sanguozhi vol. 14.
Cheng Xi 程喜	Shenbo 申伯				General	Cao Wei		
Cheng Xian 程咸					Politician	Cao Wei		
Cheng Xiao 程曉	Jiming 季明			Dong'e, Dong (Dong'e County, Liaocheng, Shandong)	Politician	Cao Wei		
Cheng Xiu 程休					Politician	Han dynasty		
Cheng Xu 程緒			193		Advisor	Liu Yu		
Cheng Yan 程延				Dong'e, Dong (Dong'e County, Liaocheng, Shandong)	Politician	Cao Wei		
Cheng Yi 成宜			211		General	Guanzhong coalition		Sanguozhi vol. 1, 36.
Cheng Yin 程銀				Hedong (in Shanxi)	General	Cao Cao	Guanzhong coalition, Zhang Lu	Sanguozhi vol. 1, 36.
Cheng Yu 程昱	Zhongde 仲德	141	220	Dong'e, Dong (Dong'e County, Liaocheng, Shandong)	Advisor, politician	Cao Wei		Sanguozhi vol. 14.
Cheng Yu 程郁				Langzhong, Baxi (Langzhong, Sichuan)	Politician	Liu Zhang		
Cheng Zi 程咨				Tuyin, Right Beiping (Fengrun District, Hebei)		Eastern Wu		
Chenggong Ying 成公英				Jincheng (around Lanzhou, Gansu and Xining, Qinghai)	General	Cao Wei	Han Sui	Sanguozhi vol. 15.
Chi Lü 郗慮	Hongyu 鴻豫			Shanyang County, Gaoping (Weishan County, Shandong)	Politician, general	Cao Wei	Han dynasty	
Chu Feng 褚逢					Politician	Eastern Wu		
Chu Gong 褚貢			184		Politician	Han dynasty		
Chunyu Qiong 淳于瓊	Zhongjian 仲簡		200	Yingchuan (Yuzhou City, Henan)	General	Yuan Shao	Han dynasty	Houhanshu vol. 74; Sanguozhi vol. 1, 6, 17.
Chunyu Jia 淳于嘉					Politician	Han dynasty		
Chunyu Jun 淳于俊					Scholar	Cao Wei		
Chunyu Shi 淳于式					Politician	Eastern Wu		
Cuan Gu 爨谷				Tongle (Luliang County, Yunnan)	General	Jin dynasty	Cao Wei	
Cuan Xi 爨習				Yuyuan (Chengjiang County, Yunnan)	General	Shu Han	Liu Zhang	
Cubahan 猝跋韓					Tribal leader	Jin dynasty	Tufa Shujineng	Jin Shu vol. 57.
Lady Cui 崔氏				Dongwu, Qinghe (Northeast of Wucheng County, Shandong)	Noble lady	Cao Cao		
Cui Ba 崔霸				Dongwu, Qinghe (Northeast of Wucheng County, Shandong)		Cao Cao		
Cui Hong 崔洪	Liangbo 良伯			Anpingguo (Hengshui, Hebei)	Politician	Jin dynasty		
Cui Jun 崔均	Yuanping 元平			Anping (Anping County, Hebei)	Counsellor	Han dynasty		
Cui Jun 崔鈞				Anping (Anping County, Hebei)	General	Yuan Shao	Han dynasty	
Cui Jun 崔鈞	Zhouping 州平			Boling (Anping County, Hebei)				
Cui Juye 崔巨業					General	Yuan Shao		
Cui Liang 崔諒	Shiwen 士文			Qingheguo, Dongwu County (Wucheng County, Shandong)	Politician	Jin dynasty		
Cui Lie 崔烈	Weikao 威考		192	Anping (Anping County, Hebei)	General	Han dynasty		
Cui Lin 崔林	Deru 德儒		244	Dongwu, Qinghe (Zhucheng, Shandong)	Politician	Cao Wei		Sanguozhi vol. 24.
Cui Shu 崔述				Dongwu, Qinghe (Wucheng County, Shandong)	Politician	Cao Wei		
Cui Sui 崔隨				Dongwu, Qinghe (Wucheng County, Shandong)	Politician	Jin dynasty		
Cui Wei 崔瑋				Dongwu, Qinghe (Wucheng County, Shandong)	General	Jin dynasty		
Cui Yan 崔琰	Jigui 季珪	163	216	Dongwu, Qinghe (Northeast of Wucheng County, Shandong)	Advisor, politician, scholar	Cao Cao	Yuan Shao	Sanguozhi vol. 12.
Cui Zan 崔贊				Anpingguo (Hengshui, Hebei)	Politician	Cao Wei		
