= Yuheng =

Yuheng may refer to:

- Eras of the Cheng Han state (304–347):
  - Yuheng (玉衡; 311–334), era name used by Li Xiong and Li Ban
  - Yuheng (玉恆; 335–338), era name used by Li Qi (Li Xiong's son)
- Yuheng (玉衡), Chinese name of Epsilon Ursae Majoris
