= Conquest of Cheng-Han by Jin =

Military campaign by Jin against Cheng Han (346-347)

- Part of the Eastern Jin and Sixteen Kingdoms period
Date	10 December 346 – April 347
Location	Sichuan
Result	Jin victory; Fall of Han

Belligerents
Eastern Jin	Cheng-Han

Commanders and leaders
Huan Wen	Li Shi (surrendered)

Strength
Unknown	Unknown

Casualties and losses
Unknown	Unknown

Conquest of Cheng-Han by Jin
- Traditional Chinese: 晉滅成漢之戰
- Simplified Chinese: 晋灭成汉之战
Transcriptions
Standard Mandarin
- Hanyu Pinyin: Jìn Miè Chénghàn Zhī Zhàn

The conquest of Cheng-Han by Jin, or the conquest of Han by Jin, was a military campaign launched by the Eastern Jin dynasty against the Cheng-Han dynasty from 10 December 346 to April 347 during the Sixteen Kingdoms period of China. The campaign, the first to be led by Huan Wen, concluded with the fall of Han and the reclamation of the Sichuan Basin by Jin.

== Background ==
In 304, refugees led by the Ba Di chieftain, Li Xiong established the state of Cheng in the Ba-Shu region after driving out the local Jin forces. Through conquest and submissions from other refugee forces, the Cheng expanded its influence throughout Sichuan, Hanzhong and Yunnan. By the 330s, they formed part of a three-way confrontation in China with the Eastern Jin dynasty to the east and the Later Zhao dynasty to the north. In 338, after the imperial family was overthrown and replaced by a cousin, (Note: Li Shou was a son of Li Xiong's trusted uncle and key advisor Li Xiang.) the state was renamed to "Han" (hence the name "Cheng-Han").

The Jin was preoccupied with rebellions elsewhere to concentrate their forces in the southwest. By the time stability was restored to the new Eastern Jin government at Jiankang, most officials within the court were against launching expeditions to recover territory, arguing instead to bide their time and recuperate their strength. Nevertheless, attempts were made by the brothers, Yu Liang and Yu Yi, but their expeditions received little support and ended in failure.

Huan Wen was a close friend and high-ranking subordinate among Yu Yi's staff. When Yu Yi died in 345, the court saw an opportunity to remove the Yu clan's control over Jing province. Under the pretext that his sons were too young, they instead appointed Huan Wen to take up Yu Yi's role in Jing. Though the court at the time had hoped they had installed a more subservient official in place, Huan Wen would soon prove to be more ambitious and defiant than his predecessor.

== Prelude ==
The Emperor of Han, Li Shi previously ascended the throne in 343. Since then, his reign was troubled by a succession crisis, a rebellion by his general, Li Yi (李奕) and the sudden migration of the Lao people into his territory. Records further describe him as an arrogant ruler who had no interest in running the state. He rarely attended court, leaving state affairs in the hands of his favourite but corrupt officials, and punishments against his people were severe.

Meanwhile, Huan Wen was considering his options between launching an expedition against the Later Zhao or the Han. While most of his subordinates were uncertain about the idea, the Minister of Jiangxia, Yuan Qiao, informed Huan Wen of the situation in Han, and argued that the prospect of success against them was feasible. Convinced by his proposal, he began preparations to lead his army into Han territory, although he did not inform the imperial court at Jiankang of his intention at the time.

== The campaign ==
=== Early stages ===
On 10 December 346, Huan Wen led his navy into Han together with the Inspector of Yi province, Zhou Fu, (Note: son of Zhou Fang) and the Administrator of Nan, Sima Wuji. Yuan Qiao commanded the vanguard with 2,000 soldiers, while Huan Wen's Chief Clerk, Fan Wang, was left to handle affairs and guard the four commanderies of Liangzhou. A messenger was only sent to the court right before they departed, and by the time the court was aware of what was happening, the campaign was already underway. Still, many officials felt that Huan Wen would not succeed due to the little troops he had and the distance of the campaign.

In February or March 347, Jin forces arrived at Qingyi County (青衣縣; north of present-day Ya'an, Sichuan), during which Li Shi became aware of their presence. He ordered his uncle, Li Fu (李福), his cousin, Li Quan (李權) and the General of the Front, Zan Jian (昝堅) among others to resist Huan Wen. The generals set out from Shanyang (山陽; southwest of present-day Leshan, Sichuan) and camped at Heshui (合水; at the confluence of the Min River and Dadu River).

Most of them anticipated that Huan Wen was moving south of the Yangtze River and wanted to lay an ambush there, but Zan Jian disagreed. He insisted on bringing his forces north of the Yangtze at Yuanyang Bend (鴛鴦碕) to wait for Huan Wen at Qianwei Commandery (犍為郡; in present-day Leshan, Sichuan). The generals went with his plan, but their initial prediction ended up true; Huan Wen bypassed Qianwei and reached Pengmo (彭模; in present-day Pengshan District, Sichuan) in March or April.

=== From Pengmo to Chengdu ===
At Pengmo, Huan Wen and his generals discussed their next course of action. They thought of splitting the army into two to divert the enemy's attention, but Yuan Qiao thought otherwise. He suggested that they should attack as one and seek a decisive victory by rushing straight to Chengdu, abandoning their cooking pots and limiting their ration to three days to plant determination among their soldiers. Huan Wen adopted his plan. Before advancing, he left behind his Army Advisors, Sun Sheng (Note: While with the expedition, Sun talked to the locals about Jiang Wei, and supposedly met Liu Yong's grandson in Chengdu.) and Zhou Chu, (Note: son of Zhou Fu) with his weaker soldiers to defend their baggage train.

Li Fu attacked Pengmo but was repelled by Sun Sheng and Zhou Chu. Along the way to Chengdu, Huan Wen fought with Li Quan and defeated him in three bouts, forcing his army to disperse and flee back to Chengdu. The General Who Guards The East, Li Weidou (李位都), also surrendered to Huan Wen. Zan Jian eventually learned that Huan Wen had taken a different route, so he marched back to where they were through Shadou Crossing (沙頭津; south of Xinjin District, Chengdu) at the Yangtze. However, upon learning that Jin forces were in the vicinity of Chengdu, Zan Jian's soldiers collapsed.

=== Battle of the Ze Bridge ===
With Huan Wen closing in on the city, Li Shi gathered all the soldiers he could find and marched out to make a last-ditch defense. The two sides met at the Ze Bridge (笮橋; southwest of Chengdu) where they fought a decisive battle.

The Han forces gained an upper hand early on, as Huan Wen's vanguard suffered heavy losses. Huan Wen's army adviser, Gong Hu (龔護), was killed, while he himself narrowly escaped death after his horse was shot by an arrow. Morale in the Jin army was at a low, so Huan Wen ordered a retreat. However, the drummer signalling the retreat accidentally signalled the Jin soldiers to advance instead. Yuan Qiao grabbed his sword and spearheaded his troops into battle. Against all odds, the Jin overcame Li Shi's army and won a great victory.

=== Li Shi surrenders ===
Upon arriving at Chengdu, Huan Wen had the city gates burnt down. The city inhabitants feared him and did not put up a fight. Li Shi's ministers, Chang Qu and Wang Wei (王嘏) advised him to surrender, but Li Shi was hesitant, fearing that he and his family would suffer the same fate as the Chengjia emperor, Gongsun Shu. After further persuasion from Zan Jian and another general, Deng Song (鄧嵩), Li Shi finally agreed.

He fled Chengdu through the eastern gate with Zan Jian during the night, and after reaching Jinshou (晉壽, in modern Guangyuan, Sichuan) on 13 April, he sent his Cavalier In Regular Attendance, Wang You (王幼), to give Huan Wen his surrender. Li Shi presented himself to Huan Wen at the Jin camp while bound to a coffin with ropes. As a gesture of acceptance, Huan Wen cut off his ropes and burnt his coffin, thus ending the Cheng-Han dynasty.

== Aftermath ==
Huan Wen sent Li Shi and his family to Jiankang, where the court bestowed Li Shi the title of Marquis of Guiyi and allowed him to retire in peace. Li Shi would remain at Jiankang for the rest of his life before dying of natural causes in 361. Though the ruling Li clan had surrendered, there were still pockets of resistance throughout the Ba-Shu. The former Han generals, Deng Ding (鄧定), Kui Wen (隗文), Wang Shi (王誓) and Wang Run (王潤) continued to resist, but were either defeated or executed. Huan Wen stayed at Chengdu for thirty days before returning to Jiangling. The situation in Ba-Shu remained unstable after he left, with the likes of Fan Ben and Xiao Jingwen rebelling for many years, but the Jin would eventually consolidate their rule over the region.

The Cheng-Han was the first of three of the Sixteen Kingdoms that fell to Jin, the other two being the Southern Yan and Later Qin by Liu Yu during the final years of the dynasty. With their demise, the Eastern Jin became the sole power in southern China, and Huan Wen was elevated to a national hero. Despite his achievements, the imperial court was wary of Huan Wen's unbridled power and suspected his ambition of claiming the throne. Ostensibly, they rewarded him with the title of Duke of Linhe and the office of Grand General Who Conquers The West. Internally, they began empowering the Inspector of Yang province, Yin Hao to counter him, setting the stage for the coming northern expeditions with the collapse of the Later Zhao in the north.

== Order of battle ==
=== Jin forces ===
- General Who Stabilises the West (安西將軍) Huan Wen
  - Chancellor of Jiangxia (江夏相) Yuan Qiao
  - Inspector of Yizhou (益州刺史) Zhou Fu
  - Administrator of Nan (南郡太守) Sima Wuji
  - Army Advisor (參軍) Sun Sheng
  - Army Advisor Zhou Chu
  - †Army Advisor Gong Hu (龔護)

=== Han forces ===
- (surrendered) Li Shi
  - (surrendered) Right General of The Guards (右衛將軍) Li Fu (李福)
  - (surrendered) General Who Guards The South (鎮南將軍) Li Quan (李權)
  - (surrendered) General of the Front (前將軍) Zan Jian (昝堅)
  - (surrendered) General Who Guards The East (鎮東將軍) Li Weidou (李位都)
  - (surrendered) Deng Song (鄧嵩)
  - (surrendered) Supervisor of the Palace Writers (中書監) Wang Wei (王嘏)
  - (surrendered) Cavalier In Regular Attendance (散騎常侍) Chang Qu
  - (surrendered) Cavalier In Regular Attendance Wang You (王幼)
  - (surrendered) Palace Attendant (侍中) Feng Fu (馮孚)

== Bibliography ==
- Kleeman, Terry F. (1991), Great Perfection, University of Hawaii Press, ISBN 978-0-8248-4033-4
- Xiong, Victor Cunrui (2009), Historical Dictionary of Medieval China, United States of America: Scarecrow Press, Inc., ISBN 978-0810860537
- Holcombe, Charles (2019), "Eastern Jin", in Dien, Albert E.; Knapp, Keith N. (eds.), The Cambridge History of China: Volume II: Six Dynasties, 220–589, Cambridge University Press, pp. 96–117, ISBN 978-1-107-02077-1

== Sources ==
- Fang, Xuanling (648). Book of Jin (Jin Shu).
- Chang, Qu (4th century). Chronicles of Huayang (Huayang Guozhi).
- Sima, Guang (1084). Zizhi Tongjian.
