= Empress Yan =

Empress Yan is the name of:

- Empress Yan Ji (died 126), Han dynasty empress
- Empress Yan (Li Qi's wife) (fl. 334), Cheng-Han empress, married to Li Qi
- Empress Yan (Li Shou's wife) (fl. 338–343), Cheng-Han empress, married to Li Shou
