= Chronicles of Huayang =

Chinese gazetteer

- A page from a Ming dynasty Jiajing era edition of the Chronicles of Huayang
- Author: Chang Qu
- Language: Classical Chinese
- Subject: Culture, history and geography of modern-day Sichuan, Chongqing, Yunnan, Guizhou and Hanzhong
- Genre: Gazetteer
- Publication place: Eastern Jin
- Media type: Paperback
- OCLC: 32726940

The Chronicles of Huayang or Huayang Guo Zhi (traditional Chinese: 華陽國志; simplified Chinese: 华阳国志; lit. 'Records of the Lands South of Mt. Hua') is the oldest extant gazetteer of a region of China. It was compiled by Chang Qu during the Jin dynasty. It contains roughly 110,000 characters. Its contents comprise history, geography and biographies of the Sichuan and Chongqing region. It was used by the Liu Song historian Pei Songzhi in his annotations to the Records of the Three Kingdoms, and by the Tang dynasty prince Li Xian when he wrote his commentaries on the Book of the Later Han.

The Chronicles of Huayang is also rendered in English as:

- Annals of Huayang Country
- Huayang National Annals
- Records of the States South of Mount Hua
- Annals of the Kingdoms South of Mount Hua

Hong Liangji said that Chronicles of Huayang is one of the oldest extant Chinese gazetteers, along with the Yue Jue Shu.

== Contents ==
There are twelve chapters in Chronicles of Huayang, the first four are on the history and descriptions of ancient polities of the region, while the following chapters are chronological history of the region from the Later Han to the Cheng-Han period, with the last few covering the biographies of notable men and women in the area.

#	Title	Translation	Notes
Volume 1	巴志	Records of Ba	
Volume 2	漢中志	Records of Hanzhong	
Volume 3	蜀志	Records of Shu	
Volume 4	南中志	Records of Nanzhong	Nanzhong was also called Ningzhou or Ning Province (寧州)
Volume 5	公孫劉二牧志	Biographies of Gongsun and the two Governor Lius	Gongsun Shu, Liu Yan, Liu Zhang
Volume 6	劉先主志	Biography of the Former Lord Liu	Liu Bei
Volume 7	劉後主志	Biography of the Later Lord Liu	Liu Shan
Volume 8	大同志	Records of the Great Unity	Records of events in the late Three Kingdoms period and the early Jin Dynasty
Volume 9	李特雄期壽勢志	Biographies of Li Te, Li Xiong, Li Qi, Li Shou and Li Shi	Li Te, Li Xiong, Li Qi, Li Shou, Li Shi
Volume 10	先賢士女總讚論	Overall discussion on the former worthies and exemplary men and women	Some notable persons who lived before the Jin Dynasty
Volume 11	後賢志	Biographies of later worthies	Some notable persons who lived during the Jin Dynasty
Volume 12	序志	Appendix	Some notable men and women from Yi, Liang and Ning provinces who lived during the Western Han Dynasty
