= Fan Ben =

Cheng Han pretender and Jin dynasty rebel (died 349)

Fan Ben (Chinese: 范賁; died c.May 349), was a politician and emperor of the Cheng-Han dynasty during the Sixteen Kingdoms. He was the son of Fan Changsheng, and after the fall Cheng-Han to the Jin dynasty (266–420) in 347, he led a restoration of the state, briefly ruling over it before his defeat and death in 349. Despite proclaiming himself emperor, most, if not all, historians do not acknowledge his reign and consider Li Shi as the last true ruler of Cheng-Han.

== Life ==
Fan Ben's family was from Danxing County (丹興縣; in present-day Qianjiang District, Chongqing) in Fuling Commandery (涪陵郡). His father, Fan Changsheng, was a famous Taoist leader who supported the Ba Di rebel, Li Xiong, in forming the state of Cheng-Han in 304. Li Xiong showed him great favour and appointed him Chancellor. Fan Ben also served in Cheng-Han's government as a Palace Attendant. After Changsheng's death in May or June 318, his office was inherited by Fan Ben.

In 347, the Jin general, Huan Wen, conquered Cheng-Han and received the emperor, Li Shi's surrender. However, some remnants of Cheng-Han continued to resist Jin despite their takeover. On 25 May 347, after Huan Wen left Yi province, the rebel generals, Deng Ding (鄧定) and Wei Wen (隗文), captured Chengdu. Due to Changsheng's immense reputation in the region, they proclaimed Fan Ben as their leader. According to historical records, he supposedly tricked many people of Shu into joining them through the use of the occult and mysticism.

Fan Ben's rule lasted until 349. In the summer of that year, Jin's Inspector of Yizhou, Zhou Fu and the general, Zhu Dao (朱燾) campaigned against him. They were able to kill him and restore order to the province.
