= Empress Yan (Li Shou's wife) =

Empress of the Cheng-Han dynasty

Empress Yan (Chinese: 閻皇后; personal name unknown) was an empress of the Di-led Cheng-Han dynasty of China. Her husband was Li Shou (Emperor Zhaowen). When Li Shou, after a coup, took over the throne from his cousin and the founding emperor Li Xiong (Emperor Wu)'s son Li Qi, he created her empress in 338. They had at least one son—the crown prince Li Shi, who succeeded Li Shou after Li Shou's death in 343. Li Shi honored her as empress dowager. Nothing else is recorded about her, and it is not known whether she survived to the destruction of the empire by Eastern Jin forces in 347.

Chinese royalty
Preceded by Empress Yan (Li Qi's wife)	Empress of Cheng-Han; 338–343	Succeeded by Empress Li
