= Guangyun (disambiguation) =

Guangyun is a 1008 Chinese rime dictionary.

Guangyun may also refer to:

- Guangyun Subdistrict, a subdistrict in Wucheng County, Shandong, China
- Guangyun Temple, Buddhist temple in Cangyuan Va Autonomous County, Yunnan, China

== Historical eras ==
- Guangyun (586–587), era name used by Emperor Jing of Western Liang
- Guangyun (974–979), era name used by Liu Jiyuan, emperor of Northern Han
- Guangyun (1034–1036), era name used by Emperor Jingzong of Western Xia
