= Emperor Zhaowen =

Emperor Zhaowen may refer to:

- Li Shou (300–343), emperor of Cheng Han
- Murong Xi (385–407), emperor of Later Yan
