= Qianzhuang (disambiguation) =

Qianzhuang were local independent Chinese banks in the early modern period.

Qianzhuang may also refer to:

- Qianzhuang station (前庄站), a metro station of Line 5 of Nanjing Metro under construction
- Qianzhuang Village (钱庄村), Guangyun Subdistrict, Wucheng County, Shandong Province, China
- Qianzhuang Village (前庄里), Daliao District, Kaohsiung, Taiwan
- Daliao metro station, of which name of secondary station is Cianjhuang (前庄)
