= Ba (state) =

Ancient state in eastern Sichuan, China

Ba 巴
- ?–316 BC
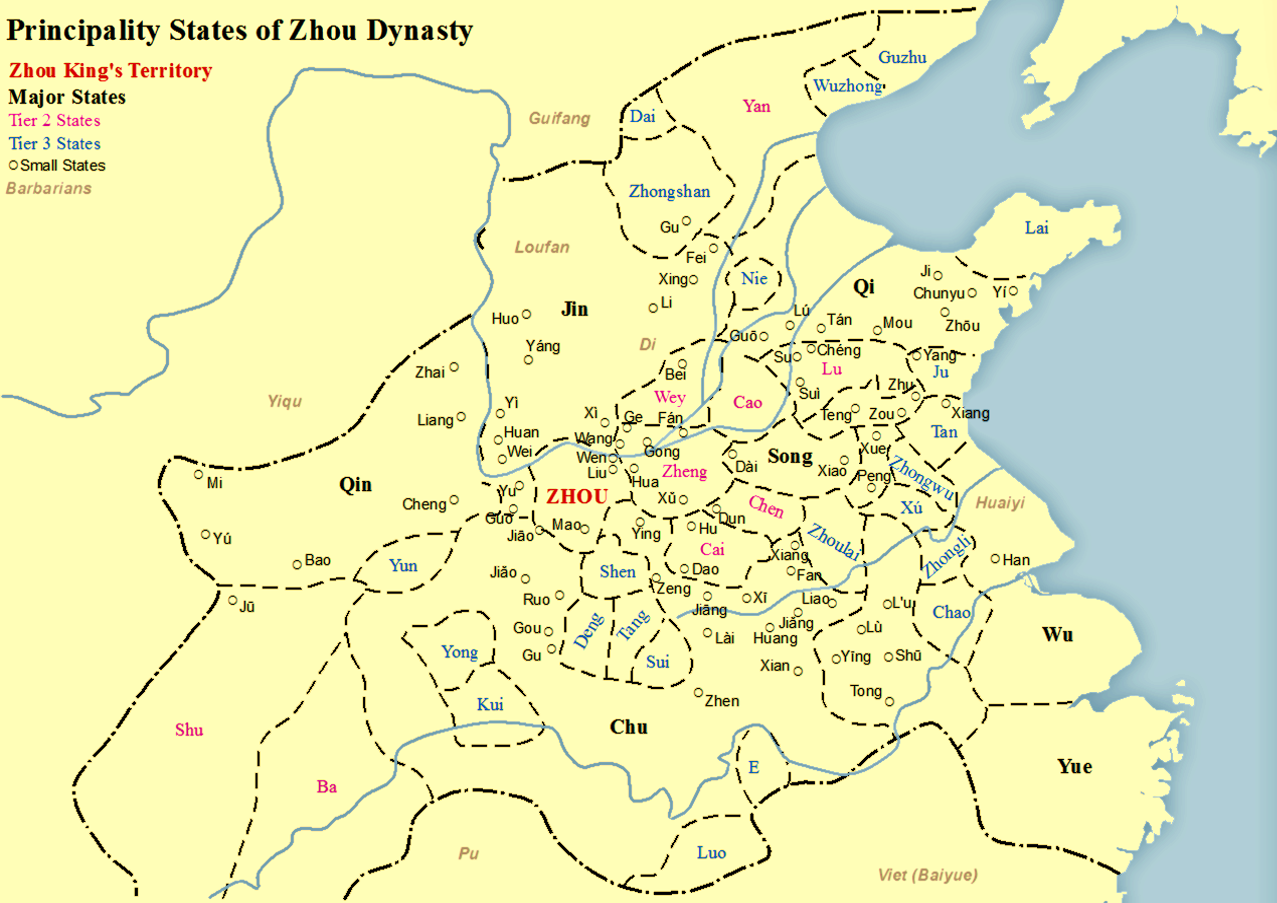
- Capital: Yíchéng (夷城); Píngdū (平都); Zhǐ (枳); Jīangzhōu (江州); Diànjīang (垫江); Langzhong(閬中)
- Government: Monarchy
- History
  - Established: ?
  - Disestablished: 316 BC
| Succeeded by |
| Qin (state) |
- Today part of: China

Ba (Chinese: 巴; pinyin: Bā; lit. 'elephant-eating snake', Old Chinese: *Pˤra) was an ancient state in eastern Sichuan, China. Its original capital was Yicheng (Enshi City), Hubei. Ba was conquered by Qin in 316 BC. The historical Bo people and the modern Tujia people trace some of their origins back to the people of Ba.

Ba, often described as a loose confederation or collection of chiefdoms, consisted of several loosely affiliated independent clans who recognized a king. The Ba clans were highly diverse, being composed of multiple tribes. Archeological evidence shows that the Ba people primarily relied on fishing and hunting, with low levels of horticulture or agriculture, and no evidence of irrigation.

== Territory ==
Ba originally included territory in the Han Valley and had its capital at Yicheng, Hubei; however the ascendance of Chu pushed Ba westwards and further into the Sichuan Basin. Chu expansion also forced Ba to move its capital several times. According to the Chronicles of Huayang by Chang Qu in the 4th century AD, capitals or administrative centres of Ba included Jiangzhou (Chongqing), Dianjiang (Hechuan District), and Pingdu (Fengdu), with its last capital at Langzhong. During the Warring States period, Qin, Chu and Shu, all more powerful states, shared a common border with Ba.

== History ==
The earliest evidence of human settlement in the region is found at the Heliang site near Fengdu and is dated to 15,000 years ago. A Neolithic site found at Daxi dates from 5000 to 3000 BC while a late Neolithic site (c. 2000 BC) was found at Zhongba in Zhongxian. The Ba people descended from the Wuluo Zhongli Mountain (武落钟离山) located in Changyang county, Hubei (难留山). The mountain had two caves, one red and one black. The son of the Ba clan was born in the red cave, while the sons of the other four tribes were born in the black cave. The earliest ancestors claim origin from Wudan (巫诞), likely referring to Wu Commandery (巫郡) from the State of Chu. Dan can also be written as a homophone for a tribe of the Ba. Recent research suggests the Dan were remnants of the Yue. The Sui Shu (隋书) Volume 82 on the Nanman says that some of the Ba people were ancient Baiyue. This suggests the Ba ruling lineage had mixed origins containing Pu Yue (濮越) and Han (华夏族) influence.

According to Book of the Later Han, the founder of the state of Ba was Lord Lin (Chinese: 廪君). In this account, there were originally five clans: the Ba, Fan (樊), Shen (瞫), Xiang (相), and Zheng (鄭), and they organized a contest to determine who should be the chief:

The clans did not yet have a leader, and they worshiped the ghosts and spirits. Together they made a pact: whosoever that could throw a dagger and have it lodged in a particular stone crevice high up a cliff would be chief. Of all the competitors, only a son of the Ba Clan, Wuxiang, was able to achieve the target, and when he did so all present sighed with admiration. Again they made a competition, giving each competitor a rustic boat and swearing, "he who keeps himself afloat [on these rough waters] shall be chief!" Again Wuxiang prevailed, while all the other boats sank. So they made him chief, calling him Lord Lin.

— Book of the Later Han

Lord Lin led the people to settle in Yicheng in present-day southwestern Hubei near Sichuan. The first Ba settlement in Sichuan was Peiling (also called Zhi), reputedly the burial ground of the earliest Ba kings.When lord Lin died, his soul became a white tiger (白虎). The Ba Clan thus fed on tiger's blood and made human sacrifices in his honour. The Ba absorbed other tribes it encountered, such as the Pu (濮), Zong (賨), Ju (苴), Gong (龔), Nu (奴), Rang (獽), Yi (夷) and Dan (蜑) tribes, therefore Ba was in reality a confederation of different groups. The Pu for example were a widespread tribe ranging from Henan to Guizhou and referred to as the Hundred Pu (百濮) due to their variety, and the Ju was a state in north central Sichuan, while the Dan were said to live on water, and the Rang were a people from the southeastern part of the Ba state known for their cliff burials.

Mentions of a "Ba country" appeared in Shang dynasty oracle bones from the 13th century BC where the king of Shang contemplated attacking the Ba. The state of Ba may have aided the founders of the Zhou dynasty in its overthrow of the Shang at the Battle of Muye in 1046 BC. However, Ba's first definitive appearance in recorded history occurred in 703 BC; the Zuo Zhuan records that Ba took part in a joint military operation with Chu against Deng. Although Chu sometimes encroached on Ba territory, Ba shared a complex relationship with Chu, with strong trade and marriage ties. Chu also employed many Ba mercenaries as soldiers in its own army. This practice sometimes caused problems for Chu; in one instance, Ba mercenaries employed by Chu rebelled and besieged the Chu capital in 676 or 675 BC.

The Zuo Zhuan described the Ba as one of the southern lands loyal to the Zhou. The Zhou dynasty seemed to have maintained close relations with the Ba state by granting some of them use of the Royal Surname and marrying Ba wives.

In 316 BC, Ba and Chu allied with Qin to invade Shu. However, after the successful conquest of Shu, Qin immediately turned on its two allies and captured the last Ba king. The Ba state was extinguished and converted into a Qin commandery. Unlike its management of Shu, Qin allowed the Ba elite to retain direct rule and did not force large-scale migrations of Qin people into Ba territory. The Ba elite would later be marginalized through a policy of divide and rule.

== Ba–Shu culture ==
As the state of Chu expanded westward up the Han and Yangtze valleys it pushed the people of Ba westwards towards Shu. In the 5th and 4th centuries BC in Sichuan archaeologists hold that this interaction helped create Ba–Shu culture.

The tiger was an important part of Ba mythology, with the white tiger being held in highest esteem. According to legend, the first king of Ba, Lord Lin, transformed into a white tiger upon his death. Artifacts from Ba archaeological sites often employ tiger motifs. Archaeological evidence also suggests the Ba people may have practised human sacrifice, which Book of the Later Han indicates was made to the white tiger spirit of Lord Lin.

Warfare played an important role in Ba society. Their warriors were often employed as mercenaries by other states; they played a role in the defeat of Xiang Yu by Liu Bang (later Emperor Gaozu of Han), and later served the Han dynasty.

Weapons were prevalent in Ba grave goods, some with distinctive curved blades. Other distinctive features of Ba culture are their boat-shaped coffin burials, and they used Ba-style bronze drums (錞于, similar to Đông Sơn drums), topped with the figure of a tiger, to communicate in battle. As in other states of ancient China, they made beautiful bronze dings or sacrificial tripods, sometimes with writing on them.

The Ba people were known for the musical abilities and gave the Chinese a distinctive dance style and music that was popular for many centuries after the state had ceased to exist. The dance, called Ba Yu (Chinese: 巴渝, later renamed the Zhaowu, 昭武) dance, was first brought to prominence by Emperor Gaozu of Han, who enjoyed their war dances. Large-scale performances of the dance involved the brandishing of various weapons to the accompaniment of drums and songs in the Ba language. It remained popular through the Tang dynasty and spread as far as Central Asia.

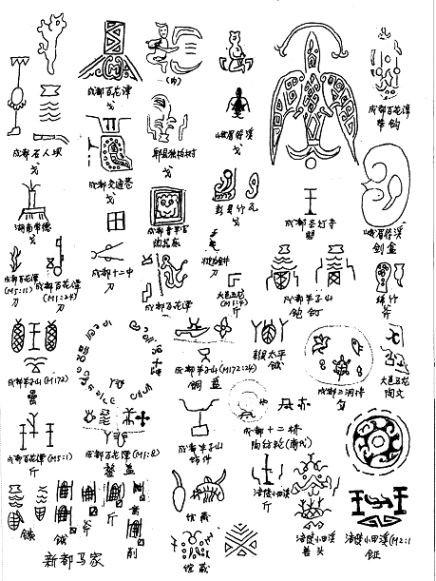
Ba–Shu pictographic scripts

The Bashu culture developed writing systems with symbols that appear to be unrelated to Chinese characters. Three Ba–Shu scripts have been found on bronzeware, none of which have been deciphered. One apparently pictographic script was used to decorate weapons found in Ba graves in eastern Sichuan. The second script is found in both western and eastern Sichuan, on weapons, a belt buckle and on the base of a bronze vessel. Some scholars believe this script to be phonetic, pointing to similarities between some of the symbols and symbols of the later Yi script. The third script (possibly also phonetic) is known only from an inscription on the lid of a bronze vessel found in a grave in Baihuatan, Chengdu.

== Ba in astronomy ==
Ba is represented by the star Epsilon Serpentis in asterism Right Wall, Heavenly Market enclosure.

== Sources ==
- Wan, Yonglin (2011). 中国古代藏缅语民族源流研究 [A Study on the Ethnic Origins of the Tibeto-Burman Language in Ancient China] (in Chinese). Yunnan: 云南大学出版社 [Yunnan University Press]. ISBN 9787548204503.
