= Empress Ren =

Empress Ren (Chinese: 任皇后; personal name unknown; fl.315 - 338) was an empress of the Di-led Cheng-Han dynasty of China during the Sixteen Kingdoms era. Her husband was the founding emperor Li Xiong (Emperor Wu).

She was created empress by Li Xiong in February or March 315. She had no sons of her own, although Li Xiong had sons by concubines. Despite this, he chose his nephew Li Ban (Emperor Ai) as his heir. Empress Ren had raised Li Ban to be the Emperor's crown prince. After Li Xiong died in August 334, Li Ban became emperor and honored her as empress dowager. A few months later on 5 December, Li Ban was assassinated by Li Xiong's son Li Yue (李越). On 6 December, Li Yue made another son of Li Xiong, Li Qi, whom Empress Dowager Ren had also raised, emperor. Li Yue forged an edict from Empress Dowager Ren to legitimize his actions.

During Li Qi's reign, she continued as empress dowager. When Li Qi was overthrown by Li Shou (Emperor Zhaowen) in c.May 338, Li Shou forged an edict from Empress Dowager Ren as well to legitimize his actions, implying that she was still alive at that point. There was no further records of her in history from that point on; her younger brother Ren Yan (任颜) was accused of treason and executed in c. October that year. It is not known when she died.

Chinese royalty
New dynasty	Empress of Cheng-Han; 315–334	Succeeded by Empress Yan
Preceded by Yang Xianrong of Jin	Empress of China (Southwestern); 315–334	Succeeded by Empress Yan
