= Chang Xu =

Shu Han official and scholar (died 266)

- 常勗

Registrar (主簿)
- In office 264 – 266
- Monarch: Cao Huan / Sima Yan

Prefect of Pi County (郫縣令)
- In office ? – 263
- Monarch: Liu Shan

Officer of Merit (功曹)
- In office ?–?
- Monarch: Liu Shan

Gentleman Elected on the Left of the Secretariat (尚書左選郎)
- In office ?–?
- Monarch: Liu Shan

Gentleman of the Household and Palace (光祿郎中)
- In office ?–?
- Monarch: Liu Shan

Personal details
- Born: Unknown; Chengdu, Sichuan
- Died: 266; Unknown
- Relations: Chang Yuan (grandfather); Chang Gao (uncle); Chang Ji (brother); Chang Kuo (brother); Chang Kuan (nephew)
- Parent: Chang Hong (father)
- Occupation: Official, scholar
- Courtesy name: Xiuye (脩業)

Chang Xu (died 266), courtesy name Xiuye, was an official and scholar of the state of Shu Han in the Three Kingdoms period of China. After the fall of Shu in 263, he continued serving under the Cao Wei state, then the succeeding Jin dynasty in 266.

== Life ==
Chang Xu was born in Jiangyuan, Shu Commandery (蜀郡), which is in present-day Chengdu, Sichuan. His grandfather, Chang Yuan (常員), served as the Administrator (太守) of Zangke (牂柯) and Yongchang (永昌). His uncle, Chang Gao (常高), died at a young age. His father, Chang Hong (常閎), was also appointed as Administrator (太守) of Hanzhong (漢中) and Guanghan (廣漢郡).

In his youth, Chang Xu was well-known along with his younger brother Chang Ji, both of whom valued simplicity and enjoyed the pursuit of knowledge. They were dedicated to the study of the ancient classic texts and excelled in the Classic of Poetry and the Book of Documents. Chang Xu was well-read in various books and his knowledge was extensive.

He was appointed as an official by Shu Han and later entered the imperial court as guanglu langzhong (光祿郎中; "Gentleman of the Household and Palace") and served as Main Adviser (主事; host and manage affairs). Furthermore, he was promoted to shangshu zuoxuan lang (尚書左選郎; "Gentleman Elected on the Left of the Secretariat"). Chang Xu was welcomed by the officials of his home commandery Shu, to serve as Officer of Merit (功曹). At that time in Shu, the commandery military and government's affairs, such as the selection of officials and management of the prisons, were under the control of generals. Chang Xu was known for his integrity, therefore he was appointed as a military commander. He was fair and just in handling lawsuits. Moreover, he was nominated as xiaolian (civil service candidate) and relocated as Prefect of Pi County (郫縣令). His administration was simple and did not trouble the people.

During the Conquest of Shu by Wei, Deng Ai defeated Zhuge Zhan at Mianzhu, causing panic in the whole region. The prefects and officials of various counties either surrendered to the Wei forces or abandoned their posts and fled. Chang Xu, however rallied the local officials and people to defend their city. He surrendered only after receiving an imperial edict from the Shu emperor, Liu Shan. Then, Chang Xu went to meet with Deng Ai, ensuring that the supplies and money in his county were preserved.

The Inspector of Yi Province (益州刺史), Yuan Shao (袁邵), praised Chang Xu's commitment and integrity so he appointed him as his Registrar (主簿). Chang Xu had a handsome appearance and was admired for his refined demeanor and eloquence. Furthermore, his manner of speech was heroic and impressive hence, he was highly regarded by his peers. However, he only associated with virtuous people and did not befriend those he considered of lower moral character than him. Despite this, he was generous and respectful toward others. In 266, when Yuan Shao was summoned to the capital of Luoyang, Chang Xu accompanied him until he died of illness on the way.

== Appraisal ==
Chang Qu, who wrote Chang Xu's biography in the Chronicles of Huayang (Huayang Guo Zhi), (Note: Chang Xu's biography is recorded in the eleventh volume of the Huayang Guo Zhi, titled Biographies of later worthies (後賢志), covering the life of notable persons from the Sichuan region who lived during the Jin dynasty.) appraised Chang Xu as follows: "Raise heroic voice, his foundation solid and powerful."

== See also ==
- Lists of people of the Three Kingdoms
