= Wucheng County =

Wucheng County 武城县
- County
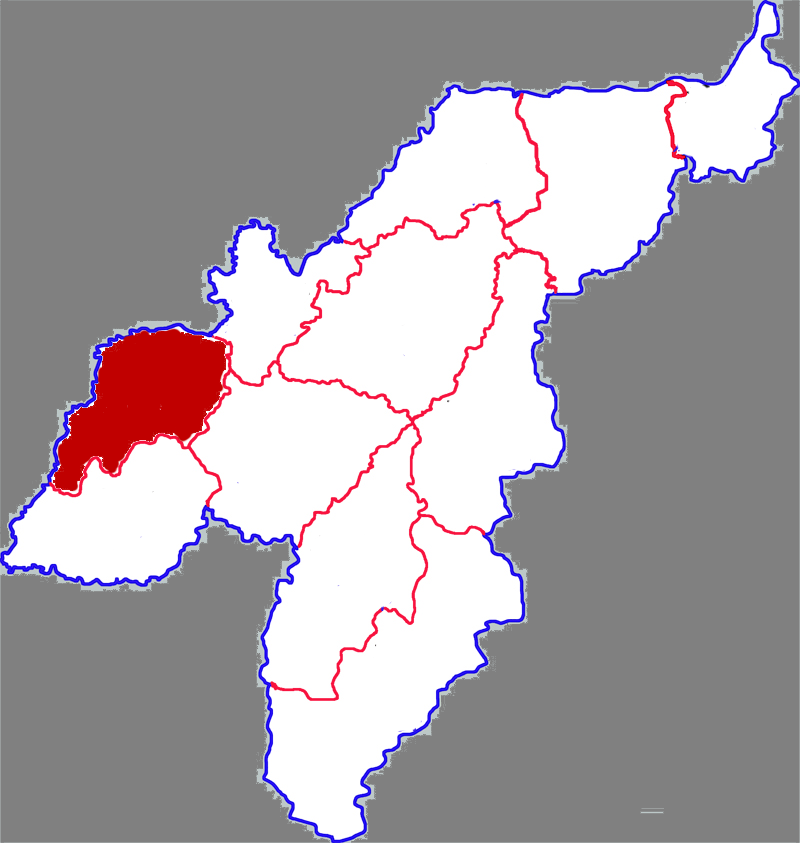
- Wucheng in Dezhou

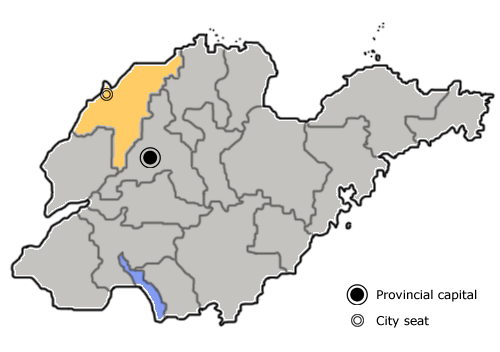
- Dezhou in Shandong
- Coordinates: 37°12′47″N 116°04′08″E
- Country: People's Republic of China
- Province: Shandong
- Prefecture-level city: Dezhou

Area
  - Total: 748 km^{2} (289 sq mi)

Population (2019)
  - Total: 377,000
  - Density: 504/km^{2} (1,310/sq mi)
- Time zone: UTC+08:00 (China Standard)
- Postal code: 253300

Wucheng County (simplified Chinese: 武城县; traditional Chinese: 武城縣; pinyin: Wǔchéng Xiàn) is a county in the northwest of Shandong province, People's Republic of China, bordering Hebei province to the northwest. It is administered by Dezhou City.

The population was 365,217 in 1999.

== Administrative divisions ==
As of 2012, this County is divided to 1 subdistricts, 4 towns and 3 townships.

Subdistricts

- Guangyun Subdistrict (广运街道)

Towns

- Wucheng (武城镇)
- Laocheng (老城镇)
- Luquantun (鲁权屯镇)
- Haowangzhuang (郝王庄镇)

Townships

- Yangzhuang Township (杨庄乡)
- Lijiahu Township (李家户乡)
- Jiamaying Township (甲马营乡)

== Climate ==
Climate data for Wucheng, elevation 25 m (82 ft), (1991–2020 normals, extremes 1981–2010)
Month	Jan	Feb	Mar	Apr	May	Jun	Jul	Aug	Sep	Oct	Nov	Dec	Year
Record high °C (°F)	16.6 (61.9)	23.3 (73.9)	29.3 (84.7)	33.0 (91.4)	39.9 (103.8)	40.3 (104.5)	41.8 (107.2)	36.2 (97.2)	37.2 (99.0)	31.0 (87.8)	26.6 (79.9)	18.9 (66.0)	41.8 (107.2)
Mean daily maximum °C (°F)	3.4 (38.1)	7.6 (45.7)	14.6 (58.3)	21.5 (70.7)	27.3 (81.1)	31.8 (89.2)	32.0 (89.6)	30.4 (86.7)	27.0 (80.6)	20.9 (69.6)	12.1 (53.8)	4.9 (40.8)	19.5 (67.0)
Daily mean °C (°F)	−1.9 (28.6)	1.9 (35.4)	8.4 (47.1)	15.1 (59.2)	21.3 (70.3)	26.0 (78.8)	27.3 (81.1)	25.7 (78.3)	21.3 (70.3)	14.8 (58.6)	6.5 (43.7)	−0.2 (31.6)	13.9 (56.9)
Mean daily minimum °C (°F)	−6.1 (21.0)	−2.6 (27.3)	3.2 (37.8)	9.5 (49.1)	15.7 (60.3)	20.5 (68.9)	23.1 (73.6)	21.8 (71.2)	16.8 (62.2)	9.9 (49.8)	2.0 (35.6)	−4.1 (24.6)	9.1 (48.4)
Record low °C (°F)	−21.6 (−6.9)	−15.7 (3.7)	−8.8 (16.2)	−1.7 (28.9)	4.6 (40.3)	10.3 (50.5)	17.0 (62.6)	12.8 (55.0)	4.9 (40.8)	−3.6 (25.5)	−16.2 (2.8)	−20.0 (−4.0)	−21.6 (−6.9)
Average precipitation mm (inches)	3.1 (0.12)	8.2 (0.32)	6.6 (0.26)	27.8 (1.09)	44.4 (1.75)	71.7 (2.82)	132.6 (5.22)	132.0 (5.20)	44.2 (1.74)	31.1 (1.22)	17.5 (0.69)	3.2 (0.13)	522.4 (20.56)
Average precipitation days (≥ 0.1 mm)	1.7	3.2	2.6	5.0	6.3	7.8	11.4	9.6	6.1	5.3	4.0	2.1	65.1
Average snowy days	2.8	3.0	0.8	0.2	0	0	0	0	0	0	1.0	2.0	9.8
Average relative humidity (%)	61	57	52	55	59	59	75	80	73	65	65	63	64
Mean monthly sunshine hours	152.2	155.0	214.5	234.8	259.4	227.6	195.0	196.9	188.9	187.6	161.4	153.2	2,326.5
Percentage possible sunshine	49	50	58	59	59	52	44	47	51	54	53	51	52
Source: China Meteorological Administration
