= Cao Biao =

Prince of the Cao Wei state (195–251)

Cao Biao 曹彪

Prince of Chu (楚王)
- Tenure: 232–251

Prince of Boma (白馬王)
- Tenure: 226–231

Prince of Wu (吳王)
- Tenure: 222–226

Prince of Yiyang (弋陽王)
- Tenure: 222

Duke of Ruyang (汝陽公)
- Tenure: 221–222
- Born: 195
- Died: July 251 (aged 56); Shou County, Anhui
- Issue: Cao Jia
Names
- Family name: Cao (曹); Given name: Biao (彪); Courtesy name: Zhuhu (朱虎)
- House: House of Cao
- Father: Cao Cao
- Mother: Consort Sun

Cao Biao (195 – July 251), courtesy name Zhuhu, was an imperial prince of the Cao Wei state in the Three Kingdoms period of China.

== Life ==
Cao Biao was a son of Cao Cao, a warlord who rose to power in the late Eastern Han dynasty and laid the foundation for the Cao Wei state in the Three Kingdoms period. His mother was Consort Sun (孫姬), a concubine of Cao Cao. He had two full brothers: Cao Zishang and Cao Ziqin.

In 216, Cao Biao was enfeoffed as the Marquis of Shouchun (壽春侯) by Emperor Xian, the figurehead last emperor of the Eastern Han dynasty. During this time, he attended a banquet hosted by his half-brother Cao Pi. One of the guests was Zhu Jianping (朱建平), a notable fortune teller. Zhu Jianping told Cao Biao, "You'll become the lord of a vassal state. When you're 57, (Note: This age was based on East Asian age reckoning.) you'll get into a military-related disaster. You'll do well to be careful."

In 221, a year after his half-brother Cao Pi usurped the throne from Emperor Xian and replaced the Eastern Han dynasty with the Cao Wei state, Cao Biao was enfeoffed as the Duke of Ruyang (汝陽公). In the following year, he was elevated to the status of a prince under the title "Prince of Yiyang" (弋陽王), which was later changed to "Prince of Wu" (吳王) within the same year. In 226, Cao Biao's title was changed to "Prince of Boma" (白馬王).

In the winter of 231, Cao Rui (Cao Pi's successor) summoned Cao Biao to the imperial capital, Luoyang, to pay his respects. In the following year, Cao Rui changed Cao Biao's title to "Prince of Chu" (楚王); Cao Biao's princedom, known as the Chu State (楚國), was centred around present-day Shou County, Anhui. In 233, an official reported to Cao Rui that Cao Biao did not follow imperial protocol when he visited Luoyang in 231. As a punishment, three counties were removed from Cao Biao's princedom, bringing the total number of taxable households in his princedom down to 1,500. In 234, Cao Biao regained the three counties after Cao Rui ordered a general amnesty. In 239, 500 taxable households were added to Cao Biao's princedom, bringing the total number up to 3,000.

In 249, the Grand Commandant Wang Ling plotted with his maternal nephew Linghu Yu (令狐愚), the Inspector of Yan Province, to overthrow the Wei emperor Cao Fang (Cao Rui's successor) and replace him with Cao Biao, whom they perceive to be intelligent and courageous. They also planned to establish the new imperial capital in Xuchang. In late September or October 249, Linghu Yu sent his subordinate Zhang Shi (張式) to contact Cao Biao and tell him that there were two popular sayings circulating in Dong Commandery (東郡; around present-day Puyang County, Henan):

"A magical horse emerges from the White Horse River. It neighs as it passes by government offices through the night. All other horses respond to its call. The following day, its tracks are seen to be as large as one hu and stretching over some li before leading back to the river."

"A white horse gallops towards the southwest. Only 'red tiger' (Note: Cao Biao's courtesy name, Zhuhu (朱虎), literally means "red tiger".) can control and ride it."

Both sayings hinted that Cao Biao should become the emperor. Zhang Shi also told Cao Biao, "His Excellency (Linghu Yu) sends Your Highness his greetings. There is great uncertainty in this world. We hope that Your Highness will love yourself." Cao Biao caught the hint and replied, "I thank His Excellency for his generosity and support." In December 249 or January 250, Linghu Yu sent Zhang Shi to remind Cao Biao again, but he died of illness before Zhang Shi returned.

On 7 June 251, the Wei imperial court received news that Wang Ling was plotting a rebellion in Shouchun (壽春; present-day Shou County, Anhui) aimed at overthrowing the emperor Cao Fang and replacing him with Cao Biao. The Grand Tutor Sima Yi then led imperial forces from Luoyang to Shouchun to preempt Wang Ling before he could effectively carry out his plans. Zhang Shi and others involved in the plot surrendered themselves and confessed everything. As Wang Ling did not expect Sima Yi to show up so quickly, he was caught off guard and had no choice but to surrender. He committed suicide on 15 June while being escorted as a prisoner to Luoyang for trial.

Sima Yi and officials from the Imperial Censorate went to Cao Biao's princedom, conducted an investigation and arrested everyone involved in the plot. The Minister of Justice urged the imperial court to punish Cao Biao for treason, so in July 251, the imperial court sent an emissary to reprimand Cao Biao for his conduct and force him to commit suicide. Several of Cao Biao's subordinates, who knew of his involvement in the plot but did not report him, were implicated and executed along with their families. Cao Biao's family members were spared, but reduced to commoner status and relocated to Pingyuan Commandery (平原郡). His princedom was converted to a commandery and renamed Huainan Commandery (淮南郡), with the commandery capital at present-day Shou County, Anhui.

== Succession ==
In 254, the Wei emperor Cao Mao issued an imperial decree to pardon Cao Biao's family members and restore them to noble status. He enfeoffed Cao Biao's son and former heir apparent, Cao Jia (曹嘉), as the Prince of Changshan Zhending (常山真定王). In 260, during the reign of Cao Huan, the number of taxable households in Cao Jia's princedom increased until it reached 2,500.

== See also ==
- Cao Wei family trees#Consort Sun
- Lists of people of the Three Kingdoms
