= Li Ban =

Emperor Ai of Cheng 成哀帝

Emperor of Cheng-Han
- Reign: August 11 – December 5, 334
- Predecessor: Li Xiong
- Successor: Li Qi
- Born: 288
- Died: December 5, 334
Full name
- Family name: Lǐ (李); Given name: Bān (班)
Era name and dates
- Yùhéng (玉衡): 334
Posthumous name
- Crown Prince Li (戾太子); Emperor Ai (哀皇帝)
- House: Li
- Dynasty: Cheng-Han

Li Ban (李班) (288–334), courtesy name Shiwen (世文), also known by his posthumous name as the Emperor Ai of Cheng (Han) (成(漢)哀帝), was briefly an emperor of the Di-led Cheng-Han dynasty of China.

Li Ban was the founding emperor Li Xiong (Emperor Wu)'s nephew—the son of his older brother Li Dang (李蕩), who died in battle in 303. After Li Dang's death, Li Ban was said to have been raised by Li Xiong and his wife Empress Ren—even though his mother Lady Luo was still alive.

Although Li Xiong himself had more than 10 sons by concubines, Empress Ren was sonless. Li Xiong was resolved to make one of the sons of his brother Li Dang crown prince and his successor. Initially, he considered Li Han (李琀), Li Ban's older brother, but Li Han died in battle against Yang Nandi in 323. In 324, he declared Li Ban the crown prince, reasoning that the empire's foundation was actually built by Li Te and Li Dang, and that it would be proper for him to pass the throne to Li Dang's son. He also valued Li Ban highly for his kindness and studiousness. Li Xiang and Wang Da (王達), foreseeing that this action would bring succession issues, objected, but were overruled by Li Xiong.

In 334, Li Xiong grew ill from an infected head wound, which then spread to other wounds that he had suffered over the years over his body. His body was said to be causing such a great stench that his sons avoided him, but Li Ban cared for him day and night. Li Xiong died in summer 334 and was succeeded by Li Ban. However, as Li Xiang had predicted, Li Xiong's sons were unhappy that they had been passed over. Two of them, Li Yue (李越) and his younger brother Li Qi, conspired against Li Ban. Li Ban's younger brother Li Wu (李玝), who had heard rumors of the conspiracy, suggested to Li Ban that he immediately send Li Yue and Li Qi away from the capital Chengdu, back to their defense posts, but Li Ban did not have the heart to send away Li Xiong's sons before their father was buried. Instead, he sent Li Wu away to try to decrease the friction. In the winter, during one night when Li Ban was on mourning watch before Li Xiong's casket, Li Yue assassinated Li Ban and his older brother Li Du (李都), and made Li Qi emperor, after forging an edict from Empress Dowager Ren accusing Li Ban of crimes.

Li Qi initially gave Li Ban the posthumous name "Crown Prince Li", effectively refusing to recognize Li Ban as an emperor. In 338, when Li Qi was overthrown by Li Shou, Li Shou posthumously honored Li Ban as "Emperor Ai".

== Personal information ==
- Father
  - Li Dang (李蕩), the second son of Li Te and older brother to Li Xiong (Emperor Wu)
- Mother
  - Lady Luo (executed by Li Qi 334)

Emperor Wu of Cheng (Han) House of Li Born: 288 Died: 334
Regnal titles
Preceded by Li Xiong	Emperor of Cheng-Han; 334	Succeeded by Li Qi
Titles in pretence
Preceded by Li Xiong	— TITULAR — Emperor of China; 334; Reason for succession failure: Sixteen Kingdoms	Succeeded by Li Qi
