= Fan Changsheng =

Taoist leader in the Sixteen Kingdoms era (died 318)

Fan Changsheng (范長生; Fàn Chángshēng) (died May or June 318) was a Taoist priest and leader who was instrumental in the establishment of the Cheng-Han state during the Sixteen Kingdoms era in China. He led a Taoist community of over one thousand families on Mount Qingcheng, Sichuan. During a critical famine, Fan Changsheng provided Li Xiong's army with food from his community's bounty. With Fan's help, Li Xiong achieved victory over Luo Shang's army during Li Xiong's siege of Chengdu.

After Li Xiong's victory, he offered Fan the throne. Fan declined, claiming that the year 304 would be an auspicious date (Note: being a jiazi year, the start of the sexagenary cycle) for someone from the Li family to take the throne. Fan Changsheng then served as the Chancellor of Cheng-Han under Li Xiong. Fan later helped to persuade Li Xiong to take the title of emperor. After Fan's death, his son Fan Ben succeeded him as the Chancellor of Cheng-Han.

Fan was the author of the lost work Shucai (蜀才), a ten volume commentary on the I Ching. He was later considered to be one of the Eight Immortals from Sichuan.
