= Cao Zishang =

Son of Chinese warlord Cao Cao

Cao Zishang 曹子上

Duke of Linyi (臨邑公) (posthumous)
- Born: Unknown
- Died: Unknown
Names
- Family name: Cao (曹); Given name / Courtesy name: Zishang (子上)
Posthumous name
- Duke Shang (殤公)
- House: House of Cao
- Father: Cao Cao
- Mother: Lady Sun

Cao Zishang (birth and death dates unknown) was a son of Cao Cao, a warlord who rose to power in the late Eastern Han dynasty and laid the foundation for the state of Cao Wei in the Three Kingdoms period of China. His mother was Lady Sun (孫姬), a concubine of Cao Cao. She also bore Cao Cao two other sons: Cao Biao and Cao Ziqin. Cao Zishang died early and had no son to succeed him. He was posthumously honoured as "Duke Shang of Linyi" (臨邑殤公) in 231 by Cao Rui, the second emperor of the Cao Wei state.

== See also ==
- Cao Wei family trees#Consort Sun
- Lists of people of the Three Kingdoms
