= Chang Ji =

3rd-century Shu Han official and scholar

- 常忌

Prefect of Henei (河內令)
- In office ?–?
- Monarch: Sima Yan

Commandant of Cavalry (騎都尉)
- In office 266 – ?
- Monarch: Sima Yan

Retainer (舍人)
- In office 264 – 266
- Monarch: Cao Huan

Gentleman at the Yellow Gates (黃門侍郎)
- In office ?–?
- Monarch: Liu Shan

Internuncio (謁者)
- In office ?–?
- Monarch: Liu Shan

Personal details
- Born: Unknown Chengdu, Sichuan
- Died: Unknown Wuzhi County, Henan
- Relations: Chang Yuan (grandfather); Chang Gao (uncle); Chang Xu (brother); Chang Kuo (brother); Chang Kuan (nephew)
- Parent: Chang Hong (father)
- Occupation: Official, scholar
- Courtesy name: Maotong (茂通)

Chang Ji (fl. 250s–280s), courtesy name Maotong, was an official and scholar of the state of Shu Han in the Three Kingdoms period of China. After the fall of Shu in 263, he continued serving under the Cao Wei state, then the succeeding Jin dynasty in 266.

== Life ==
Chang Ji was born in Jiangyuan, Shu Commandery (蜀郡), which is present-day Chengdu, Sichuan. He served as Internuncio (謁者) then as Gentleman at the Yellow Gates (黃門侍郎) in Shu Han. After the death of his relatives, he became known for his filial piety. Hence, was nominated as xiaolian (civil service candidate) and served as Gentleman Cadet (郎). Then, he was sent as an envoy to Wu, where he performed his duties admirably. After, he successively served as Changshui (長水) in the army then as Prefect (令) of Shifang (什邡) and Luo County (雒縣).

After Cao Wei's abdication to Jin, the Inspector of Yi Province (益州刺史), Yuan Shao (袁邵) was summoned to the capital of Luoyang for his recent activities in the city under his rule. Chang Ji traveled to the capital to plead on his behalf, arguing that it was not appropriate to replace him since the people in the newly annexed region were just beginning to trust their new leaders. Moreover, he also said that maintaining and fortifying the city's defenses was an essential duty of a border commander. His arguments were well received by the court.

When Sima Zhao was alive, Chang Ji was appointed as Retainer (舍人) in the prime minister's office. After Sima Yan ascended the throne, he was promoted to the position of Commandant of Cavalry ({{lang|zh|騎都尉). Furthermore, he served as Prefect of Henei (河內令), a county notoriously known to be difficult to govern. Chang Ji managed to suppress the power of the wealthy families and greatly improved the local customs therefore promoting education back to the people. At that time, there were people who raped their sister-in-laws, then killed their brothers. Gangs would then hide the culprits. Before, there was no way to impose order. Chang Ji would hunt down the criminals relentlessly and eventually brought them to justice. After becoming du of the province, he was considered for a higher position as an Administrator (太守) of the commandery. However, he died before it happened.

== Appraisal ==
Chang Ji was known for his integrity and adherence to principles, like his elder brother, Chang Xu. He did not associate with those he considered to be of immoral character. Consequently, he was not favored by the powerful and influential. Nonetheless, he wrote poetry and essays often criticising his own shortcomings. He displayed deep emotions in both joy and sorrow, earning him the admiration of his peers. Chang Ji was among the descendants of former Shu officials recommended by Luo Xian to Sima Yan to be employed. At the time, each of them were renowned.

== Duan Rong ==
Duan Rong (段容), whose courtesy name, was Zongzhong (宗仲), was born in Guanghan Commandery (廣漢郡; present-day (Guanghan, Sichuan). He was a friend of Chang Ji. He was also a man of learning and virtue. As a Shu official, he held positions comparable to Chang Ji. When Yuan Shao (袁邵) was appointed as Inspector of Yi Province (益州刺史). He chose him as his Registrar (主簿). Along with Chang Ji, they worked together in managing the affairs of the region, earning the admiration of Sima Zhao. After the establishment of Jin, he served as an assistant officer to the Bieja (別駕; important assistant to the governor of the province) in Liang province and was recommended as a xiucai (秀才; person who passed the county level imperial exam). Gradually, he rose through the ranks, eventually serving as the Administrator (太守) of Yunnan (雲南) and Jianning (建寧).

== See also ==
- Lists of people of the Three Kingdoms
