= Empress Yan (Li Qi's wife) =

Wife of Li Qi, emperor of Cheng Han

Empress Yan (Chinese: 閻皇后,; personal name unknown) was an empress of the Di-led Chinese Cheng-Han dynasty.

Chinese royalty
Preceded by Empress Ren	Empress of Cheng-Han; 334–338?	Succeeded by Empress Yan (Li Shou's wife)
