= Guangyun Subdistrict =

Guangyun Subdistrict 广运街道
- Subdistrict
- Location in Shandong Guangyun Subdistrict (China)
- Coordinates: 37°12′8″N 116°4′42″E
- Country: China
- Province: Shandong
- Prefecture-level city: Dezhou
- District: Wucheng County
- Time zone: UTC+8 (China Standard Time)

Guangyun Subdistrict (Chinese: 广运街道; pinyin: Guǎngyùn Jiēdào) is a subdistrict situated in Wucheng County, Shandong, China. As of 2020, it administers the following six residential neighborhoods and 32 villages:

Neighborhoods

- Zhendong (振东)
- Beizhou (贝州)
- Zhangnan (漳南)
- Xingwu (兴武)
- Xinglong (兴隆)
- Zhenhua (振华)

Villages

- Jiwei Village (棘围村)
- Shaxi Village (沙西村)
- Shadong Village (沙东村)
- Shazhong Village (沙中村)
- Qianwanglitun Village (前王立屯村)
- Zhaozhuang Village (赵庄村)
- Linzhuang Village (林庄村)
- Beiguan Village (北关村)
- Xiguan Village (西关村)
- Dongguan Village (东关村)
- Nanguan Village (南关村)
- Zhangzhuang Village (张庄村)
- Xiliuzhuang Village (西刘庄村)
- Liangzhuang Village (梁庄村)
- Quzhuang Village (曲庄村)
- Qianzhuang Village (钱庄村)
- Jiangguantun Village (蒋官屯村)
- Guoli Village (果里村)
- Huanghuayuan Village (黄花园村)
- Renhegou Village (任河沟村)
- Sunhegou Village (孙河沟村)
- Houwanglitun Village (后王立屯村)
- Gaozhuang Village (高庄村)
- Zhuzhuang Village (祝庄村)
- Lin'erzhuang Village (林尔庄村)
- Wangqianpo Village (王前坡村)
- Junzhuang Village (军庄村)
- Shengzhai Village (盛寨村)
- Dongqianpo Village (董前坡村)
- Duqianpo Village (杜前坡村)
- Zhaoqianpo Village (赵前坡村)
- Dongliuzhuang Village (东刘庄村)

== See also ==
- List of township-level divisions of Shandong
