= Cheng-Han =

Ba Di state (304-347) during the Sixteen Kingdoms period

Cheng-Han (成漢) 成 (304–338), 漢 (338–347)
- 304–347
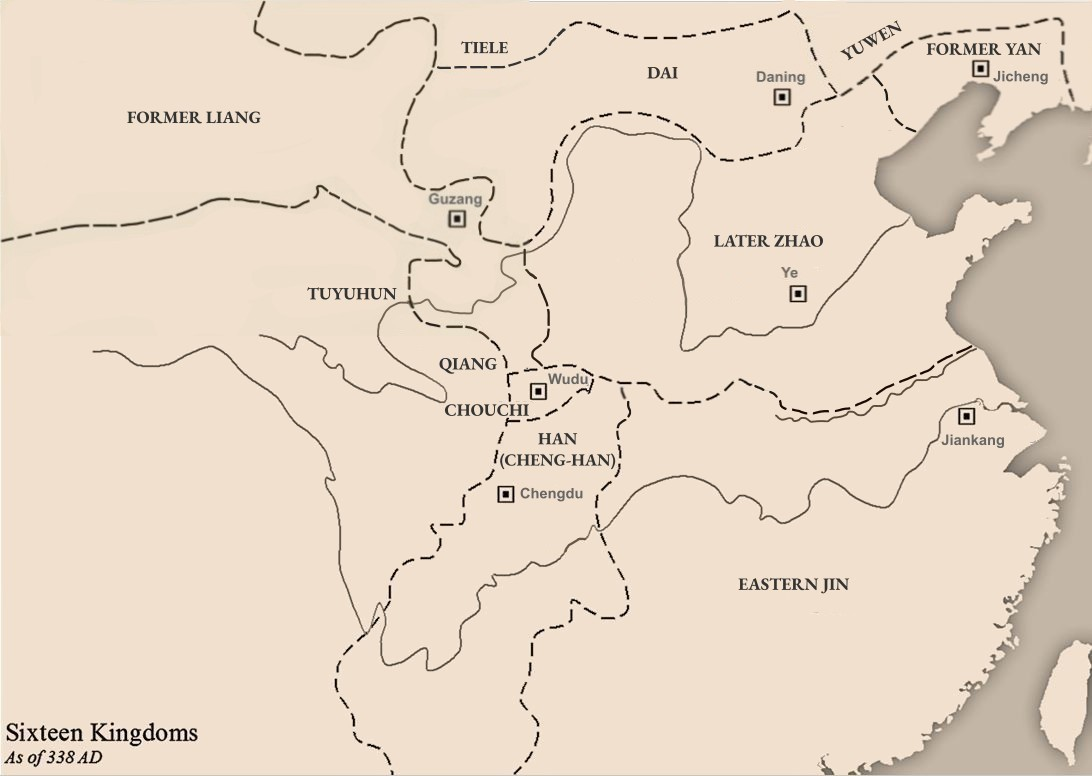
- Cheng-Han (Cheng) in southwestern China
- Capital: Chengdu
- Common languages: Ba–Shu Chinese
- Government: Monarchy
- Emperor
  - 304–334: Li Xiong
  - 334: Li Ban
  - 334–338: Li Qi
  - 338–343: Li Shou
  - 343–347: Li Shi
- History
  - Li Te's proclamation of era name "Jianchu" (建初): 303
  - Li Xiong's claim of princely title: 304
  - Li Xiong's claim of imperial title: 306
  - Name change to Han: 338
  - Disestablished: 347
  - Li Shi's death: 361
- Currency: Chinese cash coins (Ancient Chinese coinage)
Preceded by	Succeeded by
Western Jin	Eastern Jin
- Today part of: China

Cheng-Han (simplified Chinese: 成汉; traditional Chinese: 成漢; pinyin: Chéng Hàn; 303 or 304 – 347) was a dynastic state of China listed as one of the Sixteen Kingdoms in Chinese historiography. Ruled by the Li clan of the Ba Di people, its territory was based in what is modern-day Sichuan Province, China. The name Cheng-Han collectively refers to the state of Cheng (成; Chéng) or Dacheng (大成; Dàchéng), founded by Li Xiong in 304 (or by Li Te in 303) and the state of Han (漢; Hàn) founded by Li Shou in 338. The state is also less commonly known as Later Shu (後蜀; Hòu Shǔ).

== History ==
=== Background ===
The Li clan were originally Zong people from Baxi Commandery (巴西郡; in present-day Nanchong, Sichuan) in present-day Sichuan. When the Han chancellor, Cao Cao conquered Hanzhong in 215, Li Hu (李虎) among others led his family to surrender and was relocated to Lüeyang Commandery (略陽郡; in modern Tianshui, Gansu), where they intermingled with the local Di tribes. As they originated from the region of Ba, these people thus became known as the Ba Di.

In 296, the Di chieftain, Qi Wannian, led a massive uprising against the Western Jin dynasty in northwestern China. In addition to famines and plagues, the uprisng adversely affected six commanderies, including Lüeyang and Tianshui, leading to a southward exodus of Han and non-Han refugees into Hanzhong and Sichuan basins. Among the Refugees of the Six Commanderies (六郡流民) were Li Hu's grandsons, including Li Te, who all became prominent leaders for the displaced people. In 299, the Inspector of Yi province, Zhao Xin recruited these refugees as part of his plan to breakaway from Jin. Li Te initially sided with Zhao Xin, but after the latter had one of his brothers killed, Li Te led his forces to oust Zhao Xin and occupy the provincial capital of Chengdu. When a punitive force under the new inspector, Luo Shang arrived, Li Te submitted back to the Jin but retained significant command over the refugees.

Tension soon grew between Li Te and Luo Shang due to an order from the imperial court demanding the refugees to return to their homes. The refugees were reluctant to make the journey, as the north was reportedly still unstable from the years of war and natural disasters. Li Te negotiated with Luo Shang to extend their stay and was permitted at first. However, Luo Shang soon grew frustrated by their delay and attempted to force a move. In 301, Luo Shang dispatched his troops to attack the refugees, causing Li Te to rebel in retaliation.

=== Cheng (304–338) ===
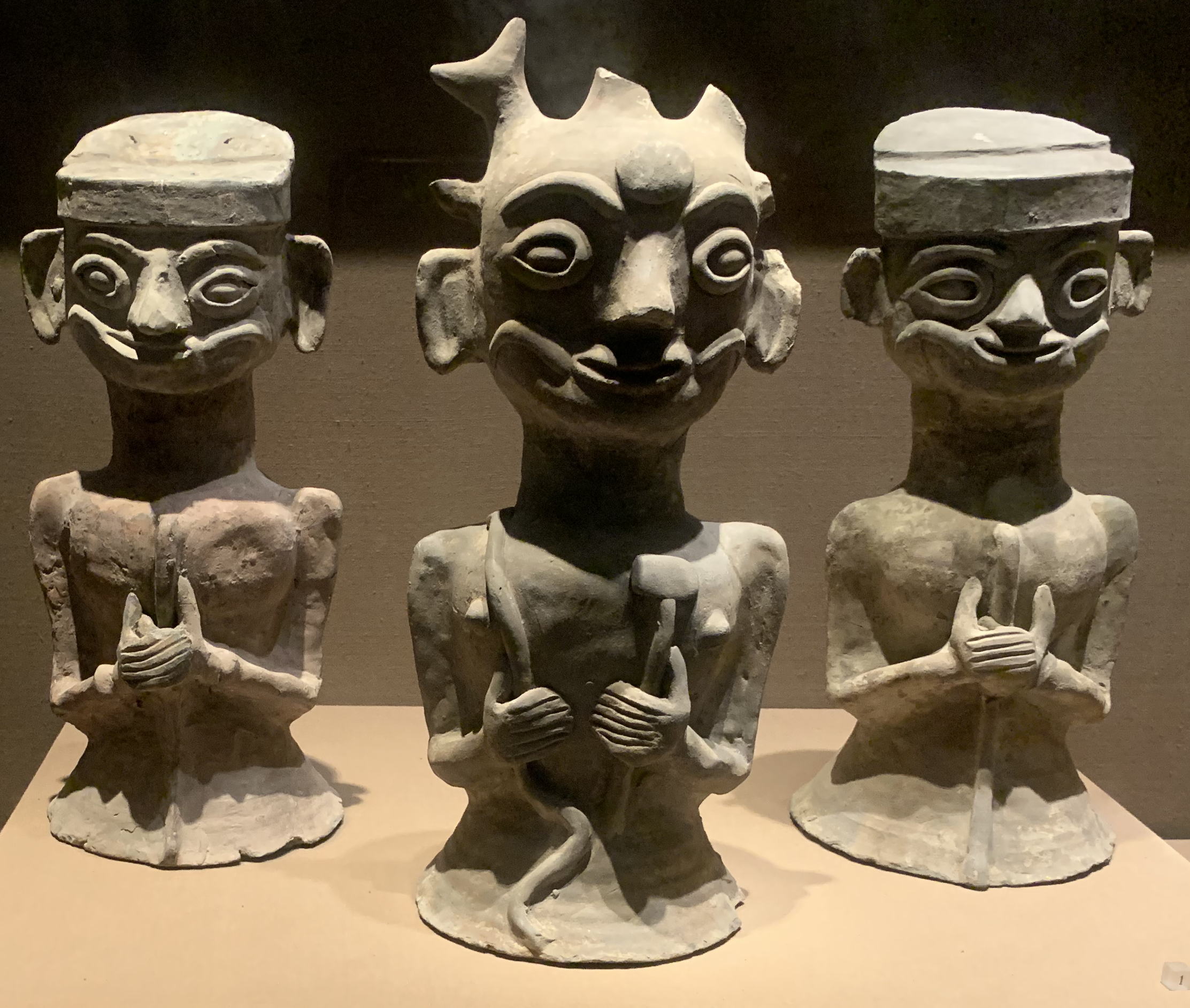
Cheng-Han Human Figurine, excavated from the Tomb of Cheng-Han, Chengdu in 1985

Li Te had much success against the Jin forces and reached the outskirts of Chengdu in 303. Shortly after, he declared a new reign era, which hinted his intention of founding a new state but was suddenly killed in an ambush. His brother, Li Liu, briefly succeeded him before dying of illness that same year. Li Te’s son, Li Xiong then assumed leadership, and in 304, he drove out Luo Shang and declared himself the King of Chengdu. His declaration is seen by most historians as the official beginning of the Cheng-Han dynasty, although there is also a view that the state began with Li Te. Regardless, the Cheng was the first of the Sixteen Kingdoms to be founded, followed closely by the Han-Zhao dynasty in the north.

Pottery Figurines and Drum from the Cheng-Han period

In 306, Li Xiong elevated himself to Emperor of Cheng. The Li clan and their followers were evidently sinicized, as they adopted the bureaucratic system of the Han and Jin dynasties for their government. Luo Shang, now commanding from Ba Commandery (巴郡; present-day Chongqing), continued to threaten Cheng, but after his death in 310, the Jin forces fell into disarray, allowing Cheng to defeat them and consolidate their rule. Li Xiong and his family were also followers of the Way of the Celestial Masters, and Taoism was particularly popular in Sichuan and Hanzhong. He appointed the Taoist leader, Fan Changsheng as his Prime Minister, with his son, Fan Ben, later succeeding him. In 314, a group of rebel refugees in Hanzhong surrendered the region to Cheng, and in 334, the state reached its peak by conquering Ning province in modern-day Yunnan from the Jin.

For most of his reign, Li Xiong maintained peace and stability within his state, but issues arose following his death in 334. Intending to pass the throne to the line of his late elder brother, Li Xiong chose his nephew Li Ban to succeed him, a decision that angered his own sons. Meanwhile, the Cheng court was also divided on the direction of the state; as Cheng had many Han Chinese officials serving under them, and with the Eastern Jin dynasty firmly established in the east, some ministers believed that Sichuan should return to Jin rule, while others wanted to maintain Cheng's independence. In 334, shortly after ascending the throne, Li Ban was killed and usurped by Li Xiong’s son, Li Qi.

=== Han (338–347) ===
Coin from the reign of Li Shou with the inscription "Hanxing" (漢興), noted for being the first coins to be inscribed with an era name.

In 338, Li Qi’s father's cousin, Li Shou launched a coup against him and seized the throne. Li Shou renamed the state from Cheng to Han, named so after his own peerage and to distance himself from the line of Li Xiong, which he considered shameful to be associated with. As they were both from the same Li clan, historiographers collectively refer to Li Xiong and Li Shou’s states as Cheng-Han. A number of Li Shou's followers had hoped that by backing him, he would submit to the Eastern Jin as a vassal, but Li Shou instead decided to adhere to a prophecy by crowning himself as new emperor. In his later years, Li Shou showed hostility towards the Jin and began modelling his rule after the Later Zhao dynasty in the north by imposing harsher laws, taxes and corvee labor on his citizens and building lavish palaces.

Li Shou died in 343 and was succeeded by his son Li Shi. His reign was plagued by a succession crisis, a popular revolt by one of his generals and a sudden influx of Rau people entering his territory. The tumulous situation in Han caught the attention of the Jin commander, Huan Wen, who was looking to elevate his own prestige. In 346, Huan Wen set off to conquer Han, and in 347, he reached Chengdu and forced Li Shi to surrender, ending the Cheng-Han dynasty. Li Shi was sent to Jiankang, capital of Eastern Jin, where he lived before dying of natural causes in 361.

== Rulers of Cheng-Han ==
Temple name	Posthumous name	Personal name	Durations of reign	Era names
Cheng 303 or 304 – 338
Shizu	Jing	Li Te	303	Jianchu (建初) or Jingchu (景初) 303
–	–	Li Liu	303	–
Taizong	Wu	Li Xiong	303–334	Jianxing (建興) 304–306; Yanping (晏平) 306–311; Yuheng (玉衡) 311–334
–	–	Li Ban	334	Yuheng (玉衡) 334
–	–	Li Qi	334–338	Yuheng (玉恆) 335–338
Han 338–347
Zhongzong	Zhaowen	Li Shou	338–343	Hanxing (漢興) 338–343
–	–	Li Shi	343–347	Taihe (太和) 343–346; Jianing (嘉寧) 346–347

== Family tree ==
Cheng Han

Li Mu
Li Te 李特 (r. 303)	Li Liu 李流; 248–303; r. 303	Li Xiang 李骧
Li Dang 李蕩 (?–303)	Li Xiong 李雄 (274–334); Wu 武 r. 304–334	Empress Ren 任皇后	Empress Yan 閻皇后	Li Shou 李壽 (300–343); Zhaowen 昭文 r. 338–343
Li Ban 李班 (288–334); Aidi 哀皇帝 r. 334	Li Qi 李期 (314–d. 338); Yōu 幽 r. 334–338	Empress Yan 閻皇后	Li Yue (?–338)	Empress Li 李皇后	Li Shi r. 343–347; d. 361

== See also ==
- Ba
- Di (Wu Hu)
- List of past Chinese ethnic groups
- Wu Hu
- Sixteen Kingdoms
- Huan Wen
- Sichuan
- Eight Immortals from Sichuan
