= Li Shi (emperor) =

Emperor of Cheng-Han from 343 to 347

Li Shi 李勢
- Emperor of Cheng-Han

Emperor of Cheng-Han
- Reign: 343–347
- Predecessor: Li Shou
- Died: 361
Full name
- Family name: Lǐ (李); Given name: Shì (勢)
Era dates
- Tàihé (太和): 343–346; Jiāníng (嘉寧): 346–347
- House: Li
- Dynasty: Cheng-Han

Li Shi (Chinese: 李勢; died 361), courtesy name Ziren (子仁), also known by his Jin dynasty-bestowed title Marquess of Guiyi (歸義侯), was the last emperor of the Di-led Cheng-Han dynasty of China. During his reign, the Cheng-Han state continued the deterioration that occurred through his father Li Shou's reign, and in 347, Li Shi's forces failed against the Jin expedition force commanded by Huan Wen. Li Shi fled the capital Chengdu but eventually surrendered. Emperor Mu of Jin spared him and created him a marquess, a title he carried for the rest of his life.

== Before reign ==
Li Shi was a son of Li Shou and his concubine Consort Li. As Li Shou was a cousin of Cheng-Han's founding emperor Li Xiong and an honored general, Li Shi himself was an army officer, and he was much favored by the emperor Li Qi, who made him an officer in the capital guard corps. When Li Shou rebelled against Li Qi in 338 and attacked the capital Chengdu, Li Shi opened the gates to allow Li Shou's army in, leading to Li Qi's defeat and subsequent removal by Li Shou. After Li Shou declared himself emperor later that year, he created Li Shi crown prince.

== Reign ==
In 343, Li Shou died, and Li Shi succeeded him. In 344, he honored his father's wife Empress Yan as empress dowager, and he created his wife Crown Princess Li empress. Pursuant to officials who believed that Li Shou improperly disassociated himself with Li Xiong and Li Xiong's father Li Te, Li Shi included Li Xiong and Li Te in the imperial family temple and reassociated with Li Xiong's regime, despite Li Shou's change of the state's name from Cheng to Han.

In 345, because Li Shi had no sons, his younger brother Li Guang (李廣) requested to be crown prince. Li Shi disagreed. His advisors Ma Dang (馬當) and Xie Siming (解思明) tried to persuade him otherwise—arguing that Li Shi, in addition to having no sons, also had few brothers, and therefore needed to have Li Guang's support. Li Shi suspected the two of them—both of whom had served his father faithfully—of plotting with Li Guang, and so arrested them and executed them, along with their clans. He also demoted Li Guang to the title of Marquess of Linqiong, and Li Guang committed suicide. The people greatly mourned for Ma and Xie's deaths.

In winter 346, the general Li Yi (李奕) rebelled and quickly advanced on Chengdu, but was killed by an arrow while sieging the city, and so his rebellion collapsed. After defeating Li Yi, Li Shi became ever more arrogant and unattentive to important state affairs, fearful and untrusting of his father's subordinates. He also carried out cruel punishments that caused the people to lose faith in him. The state was also damaged by the sudden appearance of a tribal people known as the Lao (獠), as the local governments could not control the Lao easily.

The state of Cheng-Han's affairs brought the attention of Jin's ambitious general Huan Wen. In winter 346, Huan submitted a report requesting to attack Cheng-Han—and then, without approval from the imperial government, immediately departed. In spring 347, Huan slipped past Cheng-Han forces sent to intercept him, commanded by Li Fu (李福), Li Quan (李權), and Zan Jian (昝堅), advancing directly on Chengdu. Cheng-Han forces, in fear, largely collapsed. However, Li Shi gathered the remaining troops and mounted a counterattack that was initially successful. Huan, in fear, ordered retreat—but his signal officer, in panic, beat his drums (signifying attack) rather than his gong (signifying retreat). The Jin forces attacked harder and defeated Cheng-Han forces, allowing Huan to march upon Chengdu's gates. Li Shi fled, but soon had a messenger submit a humble surrender petition to Huan. He then surrendered in person after binding himself and bringing a coffin—signifying readiness to be executed. Huan released him and escorted him to the Jin capital Jiankang, where Emperor Mu of Jin pardoned him and created him the Marquess of Guiyi. He died in 361.

== Personal information ==
- Father
  - Li Shou (Emperor Zhaowen)
- Mother
  - Consort Li, daughter of Li Feng (李鳳)
- Wife
  - Empress Li

Marquess of Guiyi House of Li Died: 361
Regnal titles
Preceded by Li Shou	Emperor of Cheng-Han; 343–347	Extinct
Chinese nobility
New title	Marquess of Guiyi; 347–361	Vacant Next known title holder: Zhang Tianxi
Titles in pretence
Preceded by Li Shou	— TITULAR — Emperor of China; 343–347; Reason for succession failure: Annexed by Eastern Jin	Succeeded by Emperor Mu of Jin
