= Li Shou =

Emperor Zhaowen of Han 漢昭文帝
- Emperor of Cheng-Han

Emperor of Cheng-Han
- Reign: 338–343
- Predecessor: Li Qi
- Successor: Li Shi
- Born: 300
- Died: 343
- Burial: Anchang Mausoleum (安昌陵)
Full name
- Family name: Lǐ (李); Given name: Shòu (壽)
Era name and dates
- Hànxīng (漢興): 338–344
Posthumous name
- Emperor Zhāowén (昭文皇帝, lit. "accomplished and civil")
Temple name
- Zhōngzōng (中宗)
- House: Li
- Dynasty: Cheng-Han

Li Shou (Chinese: 李壽; 300 – c.September 343), courtesy name Wukao (武考), also known by his posthumous name as the Emperor Zhaowen of (Cheng) Han ((成)漢昭文帝), was an emperor of the Di-led Chinese Cheng-Han dynasty during the Sixteen Kingdoms era. He was the cousin of Cheng-Han's founding emperor Li Xiong, but after he overthrew Li Xiong's son Li Qi in 338, he disassociated himself from Li Xiong's regime by renaming the state from Cheng to Han, and further setting up a different imperial ancestral temple. Traditional historians, however, did not consider his regime a separate state and treated the succession from Li Xiong to Li Shou's son Li Shi as a single Cheng-Han state. Li Shou was initially known for lenience and thriftiness—the same virtues commonly associated with Li Xiong—but later imitated the ruling style of Shi Hu, the emperor of Later Zhao, by ruling harshly and extravagantly, greatly inflicting burdens on the people and damaging the Cheng-Han state.

== During Li Xiong's reign ==
Li Shou was a son of Li Xiong's trusted uncle and key advisor Li Xiang, who carried the title of the Prince of Han. When Li Shou was 18, Li Xiong, believing in his talent, made him in general, and he distinguished himself at his post of Jinshou (晉壽, in modern Guangyuan, Sichuan). After his father died in 328, he was given a number of important posts and created the Duke of Fufeng. In a campaign in 332 and 333, he further led a Cheng-Han army to conquer the Jin possession Ning Province (寧州, modern Yunnan and Guizhou) -- which Cheng-Han forces had previously been unable to conquer, further solidifying his reputation as a general. For this victory, he was created the Prince of Jianning.

== During Li Qi's reign ==
After Li Xiong died in 334 and was succeeded by his nephew and crown prince Li Ban, pursuant to Li Xiong's edict, Li Shou was one of the key officials in control of the government, along with He Dian (何點) and Wang Gui (王瓌). He did not appear to be involved either for or against the plot by Li Xiong's sons Li Yue (李越) and Li Qi to overthrow Li Ban, and after Li Yue assassinated Li Ban later that year and made Li Qi emperor, Li Shou was created the Prince of Han and continued to initially be in control of the government. When Li Qi's cousin Li Shi (李始) asked Li Shou to join him to depose Li Qi, Li Shou refused—and Li Shi in turn falsely accused him of treason, but Li Qi instead asked Li Shou to attack Li Ban's brother Li Wu (李玝), who had warned Li Ban previously about Li Yue and Li Qi. Li Shou sent messengers to persuade Li Wu to persuade him to flee and left a path for Li Wu to do so, so Li Wu fled to Jin. After this campaign, Li Qi made Li Shou the governor of Liang Province (梁州, modern northern Sichuan) with his post at Fucheng (涪城, in modern Mianyang, Sichuan).

During his reign, Li Qi was constantly suspicious of possible rebellions, and Li Shou frequently worried that Li Qi would kill him, as both Li Qi and Li Yue were apprehensive of him. Therefore, whenever he had to visit the capital Chengdu, he had his subordinates submit false report of attacks by Later Zhao, so that he could then return to his defense post. In 338, Li Shou consulted the hermit Gong Zhuang (龔壯), who advised him to rebel and to declare himself a Jin vassal. Li Shou then further planned an attack with his advisors Luo Heng (羅恆) and Jie Siming (解思明). Li Qi, hearing some rumors of this, several times sent the eunuch Xu Fu (許涪) to spy on Li Shou and also poisoned Li Shou's adoptive brother Li You (李攸). Li Shou, in response, forged a letter from his brother-in-law Ren Diao (任調), which stated that Li Qi was about to arrest and kill Li Shou; he then showed the letter to his soldiers. His soldiers believed the letter and agreed to march on Chengdu.

Li Shou's attack was not anticipated by Li Qi, and further, Li Shou's heir apparent Li Shi, a capital guards officer, opened the gates and welcomed the forces in. Li Shou forced Li Qi to order the execution of Li Yue and several other officials that Li Qi trusted. He then forged an edict by Li Xiong's wife Empress Dowager Ren deposing Li Qi and creating him the Duke of Qiongdu. Li Qi committed suicide later that year.

== Reign ==
Luo and Jie suggested Li Shou claim only the title Prince of Chengdu and submit to Jin as a vassal, but Ren, Cai Xing (蔡興), and Li Yan (李艷) persuaded Li Shou to take the imperial throne instead. He then changed the name of the state from Cheng to Han and started a new imperial temple enshrining his father Li Xiang and his mother Lady Zan, making a break with Li Xiong's regime. Indeed, he was so embarrassed about the events of Li Xiong's era that he ordered that his subordinates' petitions and reports not be allowed to refer to Li Xiong's virtues, believing that he could exceed Li Xiong in all things. He requested that Gong come out of his seclusion and serve as a senior advisor, but Gong, disappointed that Li Shou was not willing to be a Jin vassal, declined. He created his wife Princess Yan empress, and he created Li Shi crown prince.

Later in 338, the official Ren Yan (任顏), Empress Dowager Ren's brother, plotted a coup but was discovered and executed. Li Shou used this as an excuse to also execute all of Li Xiong's surviving sons.

In spring 339, Cheng-Han lost Ning Province—which Li Shou himself had captured several years earlier—to Jin. For the next several years, Jin and Cheng-Han would, however, continue to fight over parts of Ning Province.

In 340, Later Zhao's emperor Shi Hu wrote to Li Shou, seeking an alliance against Jin. Li Shou agreed and began to build a fleet and store food supplies, ready to attack, despite opposition by Jie. Gong visited Chengdu and analyzed the situation for Li Shou—that if Jin were destroyed, Li Shou would be forced to submit to Later Zhao as well due to Later Zhao's sheer size. Li Shou thereafter cancelled the plan to attack Jin. Indeed, later that year, the chances of an alliance with Later Zhao was further damaged when Li Shou wrote Shi Hu with arrogant terms, causing Shi Hu much offense.

Early in his reign, Li Shou followed Li Xiong's ruling methods of being lenient, but later, after his messengers to Later Zhao told him about how Shi Hu kept order by harsh laws, Li Shou modified his style to be far harsher and also, in emulation of Shi Hu, started many construction projects. This, just like how Shi Hu burdened his people, burdened the people of Cheng-Han, greatly weakening their loyalty toward the state. Li Shou's reign helped to pave the way for the Conquest of Cheng-Han by Jin in 347.

In 343, Li Shou died and was succeeded by Crown Prince Shi.

== Personal information ==
- Father
  - Li Xiang (李驤), Prince Xian of Han and Li Xiong's uncle, posthumously honored as Emperor Xian
- Mother
  - Lady Zan, posthumously honored as empress dowager
- Wife
  - Empress Yan (created 338)
- Major Concubines
  - Consort Li, daughter of Li Feng (李鳳), mother of Prince Shi
- Children
  - Li Shi (李勢), the Crown Prince (created 338), later emperor
  - Li Guang (李廣), committed suicide 345

Emperor Zhaowen of Han House of Li Born: 300 Died: 343
Regnal titles
Preceded by Li Qi	Emperor of Cheng-Han; 338–343	Succeeded by Li Shi
Titles in pretence
Preceded by Li Qi	— TITULAR — Emperor of China; 338–343; Reason for succession failure: Sixteen Kingdoms	Succeeded by Li Shi
