= Li Qi (emperor) =

Emperor of Cheng-Han from 334 to 338

Li Qi 李期

Emperor of Cheng-Han
- Reign: December 6, 334 – c.May 338
- Predecessor: Li Ban
- Successor: Li Shou
- Born: 314
- Died: 338
Full name
- Family name: Lǐ (李); Given name: Qí (期)
Era name and dates
- Yùhéng (玉恆): February 10, 335 – 338
Posthumous name
- Duke Yōu of Qíongdū (邛都幽公)
- House: Li
- Dynasty: Cheng-Han

Li Qi (Chinese: 李期; 314 – c.June 338), courtesy name Shiyun (世運), posthumous name Duke You of Qiongdu (邛都幽公), was an emperor of the Di-led Cheng-Han dynasty of China. He seized the throne after his brother Li Yue (李越) assassinated their father Li Xiong's designated heir, their cousin Li Ban, in 334. His reign was viewed as one of decadence and deterioration from his father's reign of simplicity. He was subsequently overthrown by his father's cousin Li Shou the Prince of Han in 338, and committed suicide after being demoted to a duke. Li Shou seized the throne and changed the name of the state from Cheng to Han, although traditional historians treat the Li Qi to Li Shou transition as within a single state.

== Early life ==
Li Qi was the fourth son of Li Xiong, Cheng-Han's founding emperor, by his concubine Consort Ran, but was raised by Li Xiong's wife Empress Ren. When he was young, he was known for being intelligent and charismatic. When Li Xiong asked his sons to scout the population for talented people to serve as officials, Li Qi was the most successful for finding talents, so many Cheng-Han officials were people who were discovered by Li Qi.

Li Xiong had named his brother Li Dang (李蕩)'s son Li Ban as his crown prince and heir, but after Li Xiong's death in 334 and succession by Li Ban, Li Qi and his brother Li Yue (李越) were disgruntled, and they secretly plotted against Li Ban. Li Ban's younger brother Li Wu (李玝), who had heard rumors of the conspiracy, suggested to Li Ban that he immediately send Li Yue and Li Qi away from the capital, back to their defense posts, but Li Ban did not have the heart to send away Li Xiong's sons before their father was buried. Instead, he sent Li Wu away to try to decrease the friction. In the winter, during one night when Li Ban was on mourning watch before Li Xiong's casket, Li Yue assassinated Li Ban and his older brother Li Du (李都), and made Li Qi emperor, after forging an edict from Empress Dowager Ren accusing Li Ban of crimes.

The officials initially offered the throne to Li Yue, but Li Yue, because Li Qi was considered talented and was raised by Empress Dowager Ren, offered the throne to him instead. Li Qi therefore took the throne.

== Reign ==
Li Qi largely entrusted the affairs of state to his brother Li Yue, whom he created the Prince of Jianning. He also trusted Jing Jian (景騫), Yao Hua (姚華), Tian Bao (田褒), and the eunuch Xu Fu (許涪), rarely consulting other officials, none of whom was particularly talented or honest. The peaceful order that Li Xiong had established began to deteriorate.

In 335, Li Ban's uncle Luo Yan (羅演) and the official Shangguan Dan (上官澹) planned to assassinate Li Qi and replace him with Li Ban's son. The conspiracy was discovered, and Li Qi not only executed Luo and Shangguan, but also Li Ban's mother Lady Luo.

In 336, Li Qi, jealous of the talents of his nephew Li Zai (李載), the Duke of Wuling, falsely accused Li Zai of treason and executed him.

Both Li Qi and Li Yue became apprehensive of their father's cousin Li Shou the Prince of Han (the son of Li Xiong's uncle Li Xiang), the most honored Cheng general. Li Shou was aware of this and was afraid that he would be the next target of execution, and so whenever he visited the capital Chengdu from his defense post of Fucheng (涪城, in modern Mianyang, Sichuan), he would order his subordinates to falsely report invasions by either Later Zhao or Jin, so that he could quickly return. By 338, under the advice of the hermit Gong Zhuang (龔壯), he planned an attack on Chengdu with his advisors Luo Heng (羅恆) and Jie Siming (解思明), with the pledge that after success, he would become a Jin vassal. He then forged a letter from his brother-in-law Ren Diao (任調) stating that Li Qi was planning to execute Li Shou, and he showed the letter to his soldiers. The soldiers believed him, and they then made a surprise attack on Chengdu, catching Li Qi unprepared. Li Shou's heir apparent Li Shi, an officer in the capital guards, opened the city gates and welcomed Li Shou in. Li Shou arrested Li Yue and other officials whom Li Qi trusted and forced Li Qi to order their execution. He then forged an edict from Empress Dowager Ren deposing Li Qi and demoting him to the title Duke of Qiongdu. Li Shou, after some hesitation about whether to take the throne or whether to become a Jin vassal, eventually took the throne and changed the name of the state to Han, showing a break from Li Xiong's regime.

Li Qi, depressed about being a duke of a small county, hanged himself in c.June 338. Li Shou gave him the posthumous name "You" (幽), and buried him with rites accorded to a prince.

== Personal information ==
- Father
  - Li Xiong (Emperor Wu)
- Biological mother
  - Consort Ran
- Adoptive mother
  - Empress Ren, Li Xiong's wife
- Wife
  - Empress Yan (created 334)

== Notes ==
Duke You of Qiongdu House of Li Born: 314 Died: 338
Regnal titles
Preceded by Li Ban	Emperor of Cheng-Han; 334–338	Succeeded by Li Shou
Titles in pretence
Preceded by Li Ban	— TITULAR — Emperor of China; 334–338; Reason for succession failure: Sixteen Kingdoms	Succeeded by Li Shou
