= Li Xiong =

Cheng-Han dynasty emperor from 304 to 334

Emperor Wu of Cheng 成武帝
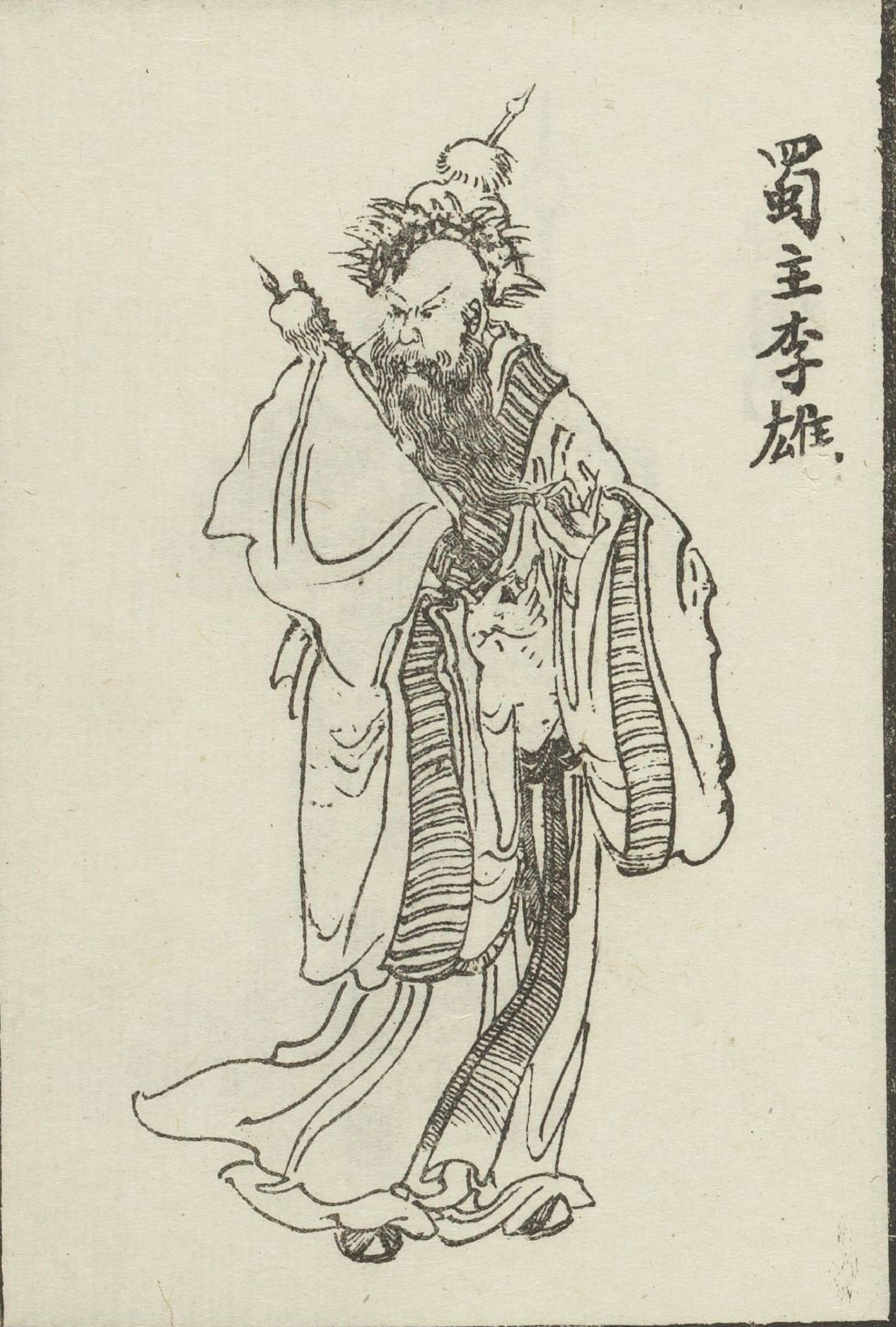

Emperor of Cheng-Han
- Reign: 304–334
- Predecessor: Li Liu
- Successor: Li Ban
- Born: 274
- Died: 334
- Burial: Andu Mausoleum (安都陵)
Full name
- Family name: Lǐ (李); Given name: Xióng (雄)
Era dates
- Jiànxīng (建興): 304–306; Yànpíng (晏平): 306–311; Yùhéng (玉衡): 311–334
Regnal name
- Grand General, Grand Commander, Governor of Yi Province (大將軍大都督益州牧, 303–304); Prince of Chengdu (成都王, 304–306); Emperor of Great Cheng (大成皇帝, 306–334)
Posthumous name
- Emperor Wǔ (武皇帝, lit. "martial")
Temple name
- Tàizōng (太宗)
- House: Li
- Dynasty: Cheng-Han

Li Xiong (李雄) (274 – 11 August 334), courtesy name Zhongjuan (仲雋), also known by his posthumous name as the Emperor Wu of Cheng (Han) (成(漢)武帝), was the first emperor of the Ba Di-led Cheng-Han dynasty and commonly regarded as its founder. (Note: Some historians date Cheng-Han's founding to Li Xiong's father Li Te.) Li Xiong's declaration of himself as the Prince of Chengdu in late 304 (Note: This was also a declaration of independence from the Jin dynasty, as Sima Ying was the Jin-sanctioned Prince of Chengdu.) is commonly regarded as the start of the Sixteen Kingdoms era. The Book of Jin describes Li Xiong as a beautiful-looking and courageous man who was over two meters tall.

== Participation in his father's and uncle's campaigns ==
Li Xiong, Li Te's third son, by his wife Lady Luo, was first mentioned in history as having been commissioned by his father as a general in winter 301, after his father had defeated a surprise attack by Xin Ran (辛冉), the chief aide to the Jin governor of Yi Province (Note: modern Sichuan and Chongqing) Luo Shang, and had been urged by the Qin Province (秦州, modern eastern Gansu) refugees that he led to assume imperial powers. However, he did not come to the forefront of the action until spring 303 when Li Te, after a major victory over Luo, carelessly believed Luo's request for a truce (Note: against the advice of Li Xiong himself and of Li Te's brother and Li Xiong's uncle Li Liu). Luo subsequently made a surprise attack and killed Li Te in c.March. The remnants of Li Te's army made Li Liu their leader and were able to fight back, but when Li Xiong's older brother Li Dang (李蕩) then died in battle, Li Liu became convinced that he should surrender to Jin authorities, against the advice of Li Xiong and another of Li Xiong's uncle, Li Xiang. Li Xiong then, without Li Liu's knowledge, made a surprise attack against Jin forces, forcing them to withdraw. From that point on, Li Liu trusted and followed Li Xiong's judgment. In c.October 303, Li Liu grew ill and, before his death, appointed Li Xiong his successor.

== Reign ==
In c.February 304, Li Xiong captured Chengdu, the capital of Yi Province, forcing Luo Shang to flee. He then offered the throne to the hermit Fan Changsheng, who was respected by the refugees as a god-like figure and who had supplied his army with food. Fan refused, and the generals then requested that Li declare himself emperor. In November or December of that year, Li declared himself the Prince of Chengdu, effectively declaring independence from Jin. He made Fan and elders of the Li clan his senior advisors. In c.July 306, (Note: In his Zizhi Tongjian Kaoyi, Sima Guang noted that Emperor Hui's biography in Jin Shu, Sanshiguo Chunqiu and Jin Chunqiu all recorded that Liu Xiong crowned himself emperor in the 6th month of the 2nd year of the Yongxing era (8 Jul to 6 Aug 305 in the Julian calendar). Tongjian adopted the account found in Chronicles of Huayang, Book of Wei (vol.01 and Li Xiong's biography) and Spring and Autumn Annals of the Sixteen Kingdoms.) he declared himself emperor and named his empire "Cheng" (成). He also honored his mother Lady Luo as empress dowager and posthumously honored his father as an emperor. For the next few years, he gradually pacified and stabilized his borders, occupying all of Yi Province—but then generally stopped, not expanding any further. In particular, oddly enough, he made no serious attempts to capture Jin's Ning Province (寧州, modern Yunnan and Guizhou), to his southwest. (Note: Very late in his reign, in 333, his cousin Li Shou was able to capture Ning Province.) He appeared to, by his actions and inactions, seek to rest his people and stabilize his regime. One area of contention that he did have with Jin was over Liang Province (梁州, modern southern Shaanxi (Note: not to be confused with the more important 涼州 (modern central and western Gansu))), which during his reigns reverted several times between Jin and Cheng-Han rule.

Historians generally viewed Li Xiong's reign of Cheng-Han as one characterized by leniency and lack of interference with the people's livelihoods. As Li's empire was generally peaceful during his reign while other places were ravaged by warfare and tumult, his empire received large numbers of refugees who settled down and added to the richness of the realm. He was also not wasteful. However, he was also criticized for having lack of order in his government. His officials were not given salaries, and therefore, when they needed supplies, they directly requisitioned the supplies from the common people which, while in Li Xiong's reign did not appear to create massive corruption, appeared to do so in his successors' reigns.

Late in Li Xiong's reign, Zhang Jun, the leader of Former Liang, a Jin vassal state, made repeated overtures to him to ask him to remove his imperial title and become a Jin vassal. Li Xiong did not do so, but continuously stated to Zhang that he would be willing to do so if Jin was to become more stable. He also maintained friendly relations with Zhang, and Cheng-Han and Former Liang thereafter maintained a trade relationship. Li Xiong also, with some reluctance, allowed Jin and Former Liang messengers to pass through his territory to communicate with each other.

== Succession issues and death ==
In 315, Li Xiong created his wife Lady Ren empress. She was sonless, although Li Xiong had more than 10 sons by concubines. Li Xiong, however, resolved in 324 to create his nephew Li Ban, the son of Li Dang, who had been raised by Empress Ren, crown prince, reasoning that the empire's foundation was actually built by Li Te and Li Dang, and that it would be proper for him to pass the throne to Li Dang's son. He also valued Li Ban highly for his kindness and studiousness. Li Xiang and Wang Da (王達), foreseeing that this action would bring succession issues, objected, but were overruled by Li Xiong.

In August 334, (Note: Li Xiong's biography in Book of Jin recorded that he died about six days after his head wound became infected.) Li Xiong grew ill from an infected head wound, which then spread to other wounds that he had suffered over the years over his body. His body was said to be causing such a great stench that his sons avoided him, but Li Ban cared for him day and night. He died on 13 August and was succeeded by Li Ban. However, as Li Xiang had predicted, Li Xiong's sons were unhappy they were passed over, and later in the year, his son Li Yue (李越) assassinated Li Ban and made another son of his, Li Qi, emperor. Under Li Qi's rule, Cheng-Han began to decline.

== Personal information ==
- Father
  - Li Te (third son of)
- Mother
  - Empress Dowager Luo
- Wife
  - Empress Ren (created 315)
- Major Concubines
  - Consort Ran, mother of Prince Qi
- Children (Note: Li Xiong was said to have more than 10 sons, but most were not mentioned in historical records.)
  - Li Yue (李越), the Prince of Jianning (created 334, executed)
  - Li Ba (李霸), died (likely poisoned) during Li Qi's reign
  - Li Qi (李期), later emperor
  - Li Bao (李保), died (likely poisoned) during Li Qi's reign

== Notes ==
Emperor Wu of Cheng (Han) House of Li Born: 274 Died: 334
Regnal titles
Preceded by Himself as Prince of Chengdu	Emperor of Cheng-Han; 306–334	Succeeded by Li Ban
Chinese royalty
New title	Prince of Chengdu; 304–306	Succeeded by Himself as Emperor of Cheng-Han
Titles in pretence
Preceded by Emperor Hui of Jin	— TITULAR — Emperor of China; 304–334; Reason for succession failure: Sixteen Kingdoms	Succeeded by Li Ban
