= Li Xiang (Xuanlong) =

Prince of the Cheng-Han dynasty

- 李驤

Grand Tutor (太傅)
- In office 304 – ?
- Monarch: Li Xiong

Personal details
- Born: Unknown Lüeyang County, Shaanxi
- Died: 328
- Spouse: Lady Zan
- Children: Li Shou
- Parent: Li Mu (father)
- Courtesy name: Xuanlong (玄龍)
- Posthumous name: Emperor Xian (獻帝)

Li Xiang (died 328), courtesy name Xuanlong, was a Ba Di military general and prince of the Cheng-Han dynasty during the Sixteen Kingdoms period. He was the uncle of the first emperor, Li Xiong, and the father of the fourth, Li Shou. He was an important general during the rebellion of his elder brothers, Li Te and Li Liu, and during the reign of his nephew as Emperor of Cheng. After Li Shou took the throne and reestablished the dynasty as Han, Li Xiang was given the posthumous name of Emperor Xian of Han.

== Li Te's Rebellion ==
Li Xiang was the youngest of Li Mu's five sons and was described as a valiant and capable warrior. When the Six Commanderies refugees were displaced by Qi Wannian's rebellion (296–299), he and his brothers left their hometown of Lüeyang Commandery (略陽郡; in modern Tianshui, Gansu) for their ancestral home in Yi province. In 301, his elder brother, Li Te ousted the rebellious governor, Zhao Xin from Yi, and when the new imperial court-appointed provincial inspector, Luo Shang arrived, Li Te sent Li Xiang to welcome him with rare treasures. Luo Shang was pleased and appointed Li Xiang as Cavalry Commander.

Later that year however, Li Te and Luo Shang began clash over an imperial order forcing the refugees to return to their homes in the north. Luo Shang set post signs along the roads offering a bounty for Li Te and his brothers. In retaliation, Li Te, with help from Li Xiang, altered the contents of these signs to include the other major families among the Six Commanderies refugees and the chieftains of the Di and Sou (叟; general term for ethnic groups in southwestern China) tribes. The refugees were shocked and all flocked to Li Te for protection. When Li Te finally rebelled, Li Xiang responded by raising an army, and his brother appointed him as General of Fierce Cavalry.

In 302, Li Xiang, along with Li Pan (李攀), Ren Hui (任回) and Li Gong (李恭) garrisoned at Piqiao (毗橋, south of present-day Xindu District, Sichuan) in anticipation of an attack from Luo Shang. When Luo Shang finally attacked, Li Xiang repeatedly defeated him. He also seized the enemy weapons and burnt their camp gates. Luo Shang had his subordinate, Zhang Xing (張興) feign surrender to observe the situation within Li Xiang's army. Upon learning that Li Xiang had less than 2,000 soldiers, Luo Shang brought with him 10,000 elite soldiers to carry out a night attack on his camp. Li Pan was killed in the fighting, and Li Xiang retreated to his other brother, Li Liu's camp. After reorganizing his forces with Li Liu, they intecepted Luo Shang's advancing army and greatly defeated them, nearly wiping out his force.

In 303, Li Te reached the outskirts of the provincial capital, Chengdu, but he was suddenly killed in an ambush by Luo Shang. He was hastily succeeded by Li Liu, and not long after, Luo Shang launched a counterattack on his camp at Chizu (赤祖, in present-day Mianzhu, Sichuan). Li Liu sent Li Xiang to oppose Luo's general, Chang Shen (常深), and though the main camp nearly fell, Li Xiang was able to break through Chang Shen's palisade and scatter his troops. The rest of Li Liu's forces were able to repel Luo Shang's forces in the end.

Subsequently, Li Liu advanced towards Chengdu, but during the march, Li Te's eldest son, Li Dang (李蕩) was killed in battle. With both Li Te and Li Dang dying, as well as arriving Jin reinforcements under Sun Fu (孫阜) and Zong Dai (宗岱) from Jing province in the east, Li Liu was afraid and wanted to surrender. Li Xiang and Li Te's younger son, Li Xiong, both strongly opposed this move, but Li Liu refused. On his own accord, Li Xiong personally defeated Sun Fu, while Zong Dai coincidentally died of natural causes, forcing the reinforcements to retreat. When Li Liu died of illness later in 303, he was succeeded by Li Xiong.

Immediately after, Li Xiong sent his subordinate, Pu Tai (朴泰) to feign surrender to Luo Shang. Pu promised him to hand over Picheng, and falling for his deception, Luo sent his general Kui Bo (隗伯) to capture the city. Beforehand, Li Xiang had set an ambush along the roads towards Picheng, while Pi informed Kui that he would light a fire as a signal. After they arrived, Li Xiang's men lowered ladders down the city wall while Pi lit the fire, prompting Kui Bo's soldiers to climb up the ladders. As soon as they did, the ambush units sprang out and attacked them from behind, achieving a great victory and capturing Kui Bo. Li Xiang's men pursued the retreating troops to the Lesser City of Chengdu, where he shouted, "We have captured Picheng!" The guards of the Lesser City, believing that their allies had returned, unknowingly allowed Li Xiang's army to enter. When Luo Shang realized his mistaked, he withrew into the Greater City section of Chengdu.

Later, Li Xiang marched to Jianwei, where he killed the local Administrator, Xi Hui (襲恢) and cut off Luo Shang's supply route. He then defeated and killed the Officer of Merit, Yang Huan (楊渙) and the Assistant Officer, Xu Yan (許延). Xu's wife, Lady Du (杜氏), was described as beautiful, so Li Xiang tried to take her as his own. Lady Du refused and wept as she guarded her husband's corpse, saying, "You wicked traitors deserve to die in due order! You think you will live long? I, a daughter of the Du clan, would never be a bandit's wife!" Enraged, Li Xiang killed her.

== Service under Cheng ==
In 304, Luo Shang was driven out of Chengdu by the rebels. Li Xiong then declared himself the King of Chengdu, thus establishing his state of Cheng. Li Xiang was appointed by his nephew to serve as the Grand Tutor. When Li Xiong's mother, Lady Luo, died in an unspecified year, Li Xiong carried out a three-year mourning period. With the help of the minister Ren Hui and Shangguan Dun (上官惇), Li Xiang was able to convince Li Xiong to cut short his excessive practice and return to court.

Shortly after escaping Chengdu, Luo Shang was able to regroup his forces at Ba Commandery (巴郡; present-day Chongqing), where he continued to contain the Cheng's growing power. The same year Li Xiong became king, Luo sent his men to raid his territory, capturing Li Xiang's wife, Lady Zan (昝氏) and his son, Li Shou. In 309, Luo launched a major offensive into Cheng after receiving the surrender of Zitong Commandery. Li Xiang, along with Li Yun (李雲) and Li Huang (李璜), attempted to recapture the commandery. However, they were routed, and Li Yun and Li Huang were killed in battle.

Despite their early losses, in 311, Luo Shang died of illness, and the Jin forces descended into brutal infighting. Li Xiang then led an attack on Fucheng as the city was cut off from their supply lines. The Jin general at Fucheng, Qiao Deng defended fiercely, but he also decided to release Li Shou from captivity and send him back to Li Xiang. Li Xiang eventually captured Fucheng, and with Baxi also recaptured by the Cheng, the Jin offensive came to an end.

In 318, the Inspector of Liang province, Li Feng (李鳳) rebelled at Baxi Commandery. Li Shou ordered Li Xiang to suppress the rebellion, and Li Xiang defeated and killed Li Feng. Li Xiong rewarded his uncle by appointing Li Shou as General of the Front and Commander of military affairs in Baxi.

In 323, Li Xiang invaded the Ning province (寧州; present-day Yunnan and Guizhou) commanderies of Yuexi and Zhuti (朱提; in present-day Zhaotong, Yunnan), forcing the Jin administrator, Li Zhao (李钊) to surrender. He then proceeded to attack the Inspector of Ning province, Wang Xun, who responded by sending out his entire army under his subordinate, Yao Yue (姚嶽) to meet the Cheng army. Li Xiang gradually gained a disadvantage, and as it began to rain for several days, he decided to issue a retreat. However, Yao Yue pursued him, and as they scrambled to cross the Lu River, many of Li Xiang's soldiers drowned.

Li Xiang was later promoted to Commander of all military affairs, Grand General, acting Army-Protector of the center, Colonel of the Western Barbarians and Chief of Affairs of the Masters of Writing. In 324, Li Xiong decided to appoint Li Ban, the son of his deceased elder brother, Li Dang, as his Crown Prince despite the fact that he had ten sons of his own. Li Xiang, along with the Minister Over the Masses, Wang Da (王達), admonished him by saying, "The old kings always established their own sons as heirs to clearly define the order of succession and prevent usurpation. The examples of Duke Xuan of Song (宋宣公) and Yuji of Wu (吴馀祭) are enough to illustrate this!" However, Li Xiong refused to heed their advice, causing Li Xiang to leave in tears and exclaim, "Now disaster is sure to happen!"

In 328, Li Xiang died. He was posthumously appointed as Prime Minister and was given the posthumous name of "Prince Xian of Han". Li Shou was given his father's offices of Grand General and Colonel of the Western Barbarians. After Li Shou ascended the throne in 338, he elevated his father's posthumous title to "Emperor Xian".
