= Li Liu (Cheng-Han) =

Spiritual founder of Cheng-Han

Li Liu 李流

ruler of Cheng-Han
- Reign: c. March – c. October 303
- Predecessor: Li Te
- Successor: Li Xiong
- Born: 248
- Died: c. October 303
Full name
- Family name: Li (李; lǐ); Given name: Liu (流, liú)
Era name and dates
- Jiànchū (建初): 303
Regnal name
- Grand General, Grand Commander, Governor of Yi Province (大將軍 大都督 益州牧)
Posthumous name
- Prince Wen of Qin (秦文王)
- Dynasty: Cheng-Han

Li Liu (Chinese: 李流; 248 – c.October 303), courtesy name Xuantong (玄通), posthumous name Prince Wen of Qin (秦文王), was a younger brother of Li Te and an uncle of Li Xiong (Emperor Wu of Cheng-Han), the founder of the Cheng-Han dynasty of China during the Sixteen Kingdoms period. He was his brother's general during his war with Luo Shang in Yizhou. After Li Te was killed in an ambush in c.March 303, Li Liu was hastily chosen by Te's followers as his successor. He saved Li Te's army from destruction during the aftermath of his death but later decided to have his nephew, Li Xiong handle military responsibilities. Li Liu died in c.October 303, just a year before Cheng-Han's creation in November or December 304. Despite succeeding Li Te first, he never granted himself an imperial title nor introduced a new reign era. Furthermore, due to being his uncle, Li Xiong only posthumously honoured him as a king and not an emperor in 306.

== Service under Li Xiáng and Li Te ==
Li Liu was the fourth son of Li Mu and the younger brother of Li Te. His family was originally from Baxi Commandery (巴西郡; around present-day Langzhong, Sichuan) but moved to Qinzhou (秦州, modern eastern Gansu) and assimilated with the Di people. He was talented from a young age, earning the respect of the Colonel of Eastern Qiang tribes He Pan, who made Li Liu his Director. In 296, A Di chieftain named Qi Wannian rebelled around Li Liu's home, coinciding with a terrible famine and military occupation. Li Liu followed his brother to their ancestral home in Yizhou to escape the turmoil in the north.

In 300, Li Liu's other brother Li Xiáng (courtesy name Xuanxu) joined a rebellion led by Zhao Xin against the Jin dynasty (266–420) in Yizhou. Li Liu followed suit and gathered his own men to join his brother. However, Zhao Xin would kill Li Xiáng out of jealousy the following year. Zhao Xin sent messengers to console Li Liu and Li Te about their loss, but they only grew enraged. The two brothers led troops to Chengdu to avenge Li Xiáng, forcing Zhao Xin to flee from the province.

Li Te was now in control of Yizhou but with Jin forces led by Luo Shang heading his way, he decided to establish friendly relationships. Li Liu was tasked in sending oxen and wine to Luo Shang at Mianzhu, which were accepted. For his efforts in putting down Zhao Xin, Li Liu was made General Who Exerts Valor.

However, Li Te's attempts at making peace with Luo Shang was met with issues as the court in Luoyang demanded that refugees who fled from the north return to their respective provinces. The refugees did not want to leave the south, as they heard that the north was still in chaos, so Li Te begged Luo Shang for months to extend their stay. Luo Shang was lenient at first but was soon determined to send them back, so Li Te prepared himself for war. Li Liu helped his brother gather more men and trained the refugees to bolster his forces.

As predicted, fighting broke out between the two side in 301. Li Te scored the first victory despite Luo Shang attacking first. Li Te then made Li Liu Grand General Who Guards The East and had him follow him through most of his campaigns. The following year, Li Liu joined in the assault on Piqiao (毗橋, south of present-day Xindu District, Sichuan), helping his other brother Li Xiāng (courtesy name Xuanlong) rout Luo Shang's best troops.

In early 303, Li Te reached Chengdu, which prompted Luo Shang to sue for peace. However, Li Liu was wary of this, and together with Shangguan Dun (上官惇), warned Li Te in a letter by saying, "Accepting a surrender is like receiving an enemy." At the start of the war, many in the Shu region moved into fortifications to defend themselves. Although Li Te treated them kindly, Li Liu pointed out to his brother that people living in these fortifications may not be loyal as they seem, and urged him to force them into sending hostages. However, Li Te ignored his concerns, and as a result, he was killed by Luo Shang in an ambush just a month later.

== Taking command of the army ==
Li Te's sudden death took his army by surprise. Li Liu and the others fell back to Chizu (赤祖, in present-day Mianzhu, Sichuan), where Liu was hastily elected to succeed his brother. Luo Shang was quick to capitalize on his recent victory and sent a large contingent of troops to attack Li Liu's camp. Li Liu and the others fought hard against the invaders, but the situation worsened when the Di leaders, Fu Cheng (苻成) and Kui Bo (隗伯) betrayed him. The situation was so desperate, that Li Te's widow Lady Luo personally fought in the defence. Despite the odds, Li Liu drove out both the invaders and traitors from his camp before quickly putting Chengdu under siege to place pressure on Luo Shang.

After just barely surviving an attack, Li Liu wondered if he should continue the rebellion. Jin reinforcements led by Zong Dai (宗岱) and Sun Fu (孫阜) were approaching while his brother-in-law Li Han was pushing for surrender. His nephew Li Xiong and Li Xiang opposed him, but Li Liu was adamant on surrender. He sent his son Li Shi and Li Han's son Li Hu as hostages to Sun Fu. However, Li Xiong and Li Li (李離) went against Li Liu's orders, and instead routed Sun Fu while Zong Dai coincidentally died of natural causes. The reinforcements from Jingzhou all fled home because of their generals’ deaths. Li Liu felt ashamed for not following Li Xiong's advice earlier, but seeing that his nephew was more capable than he is, decided to entrust Xiong with military matters.

Li Liu moved his camp to Pi County. His army was left with little supply as many of the people of Yizhou decided to migrate to neighbouring provinces. Luckily, Luo Shang had a fall-out with his subordinate Xu Yu (徐轝), who wanted him to ally with the hermit Fan Changsheng but was turned down. Xu Yu defected to Li Liu who carried out Xu Yu's wishes. Fan Changsheng had thousands of families under him at Mount Qingcheng, who sought his protection from the war. Fan agreed to ally himself with Li Liu and provided him with food and supply to last the entire war.

== Death ==
During the winter of 303, Li Liu grew deathly ill. He had decided that his nephew, Li Xiong should be the one to lead his army. Li Liu soon died and Li Xiong took over his command. Li Xiong would drive out Luo Shang and the Jin forces out from the regions of Ba and Shu the following year, establishing his own state of Cheng (later renamed Han in 338). He posthumously honoured his uncle as King Wen of Qin after becoming emperor in c.July 306.
