= Empress Dowager Luo =

Empress Dowager of Cheng Han

Lady Luo (Chinese: 羅氏), also known as Empress Dowager Luo (Chinese: 羅太皇后), was an empress dowager of Cheng-Han during the Sixteen Kingdoms period. She was the wife of the Ba Di leader Li Te and the mother of the dynastic founder of Cheng-Han, Li Xiong (Emperor Wu). She is noted as one of the few recorded women to have fought in battle during her time, participating in the defense of Chizu (赤祖, in present day Mianzhu, Sichuan) in 303.

== Life ==
Nothing much is known about Lady Luo's early life. She was the wife of a Ba Di man named Li Te, whose ancestors originated from Baxi Commandery (巴西郡; around present-day Langzhong, Sichuan) in Yizhou but later relocated to Qinzhou (秦州, modern eastern Gansu) where they assimilated themselves with the Di people. They had two sons, Li Dang and Li Xiong, but not Li Shi (李始) the eldest son of Li Te. According to legend, it was said that before she gave birth to Li Dang, she had a dream of a pair of rainbows that came out from a gate growing through the sky when suddenly, one of them stopped halfway through. In another dream, she saw a serpent which proceeded to coil around her. Shortly after this, she was impregnated with Li Xiong. Lady Luo always believed that if either Li Dang or Li Xiong were to die young, then the other one would be destined for greatness.

In 296, the Di chieftain Qi Wannian rebelled in Li Te's area, so he moved back to his ancestral home in Ba together with Lady Luo. However, he soon found himself involved in a rebellion led by Zhao Xin in 301. He later killed Zhao and submitted back to Jin, but a shaky relationship between him and Jin's Inspector of Yizhou, Luo Shang led to a war between the two, with Li Te being killed in c.March 303.

Li Te's army was thrown into a state of panic with news of their leader's sudden death. He was succeeded by his brother Li Liu who regrouped his forces at Chizu. A combined force of He Chong (何沖), Chang Shen (常深) and Yao Shen (藥紳) were sent by Luo Shang to surround their camp. To make matters worse, the Di leaders Fu Cheng (苻成) and Kui Bo (隗伯) betrayed Li Liu and attacked him as well. In desperation, Lady Luo armed herself and fought with the enemy head on. She was injured while fighting Kui Bo’s men when a blade struck one of her eyes, but this only made her fight harder. Despite the odds, Li Liu's forces survived and drove out the attackers from their camp. Li Liu quickly pushed onto Luo Shang's base in Chengdu.

Unfortunately for Lady Luo, Li Dang was killed by a spear during the attack on Chengdu. She and Li Xiong decided to keep his death a secret to prevent morale from dropping.

Li Liu would die later in c.October 303 and was succeeded by Li Xiong. Li Xiong drove out Luo Shang out from the Ba and Shu regions and declared his state of Cheng. Xiong honoured Lady Luo as queen dowager (later empress dowager as Li Xiong declared himself emperor in c.July 306) and his father King Jing of Chengdu.

Empress Dowager Luo died in an unknown year. At the advice of a magician, Li Xiong originally decided not to bury his mother. However, at the persuasion of his Minister of Works, Zhao Su (趙肅), Li Xiong finally had her buried. Li Xiong held what was supposed to be a three years mourning session for his mother, but once again, at the behest of his ministers, decided to cut it short and returned to the government.
