= Li Xiang (Xuanxu) =

- 李庠

General Who Awes Invaders (威寇將軍)
- In office 300 – 301
- Monarch: Zhao Xin

Personal details
- Born: 247 Lüeyang County, Shaanxi
- Died: 301
- Children: Unnamed son
- Parent: Li Mu (father)
- Courtesy name: Xuanxu (玄序)
- Posthumous name: Prince Wu of Liang (梁武王)

Li Xiang (247–301), courtesy name Xuanxu, posthumous name Prince Wen of Qin, was a Ba Di military general of the Jin dynasty (266–420). He was the uncle of Li Xiong, the first emperor of the Cheng-Han dynasty during the Sixteen Kingdoms period. After his family became refugees and migrated into Yi Province, Li Xiang became a general for the local governor, Zhao Xin, who plotted to breakaway from the Western Jin. As Li Xiang's influence grew by the day, Zhao became suspicious of him and eventually had him executed, causing his elder brother, Li Te to raise his army against Zhao and oust him.

== Life ==
=== Background and early career ===
Li Xiang was the third son of five sons of the Ba Di, Li Mu (李慕). His family were originally Zong people from Baxi Commandery (巴西郡; around present-day Langzhong, Sichuan) who later moved to Hanzhong and then to Lüeyang Commandery (略陽郡; in modern Tianshui, Gansu). Li Xiang was described as fierce and spirited from a young age, which earned him renown. Among his brothers, he was notably the only one known to have served in the Western Jin government, starting his career as an Investigator and Registrar. In both roles, he earned distinction for his competence.

In 294, he was nominated for the title of Xiaolian, but he turned down the offer. Due to his skills in archery and horsemanship, he was also recommended as a Worthy Commander, but he once again declined. Finally, the provincial government recommended Li Xiang for the special title of Xiuyi (秀異; "Oustanding Talent") due to his literary and martial talents, which Li firmly refused by claiming illness. However, the provincial government did not accept his reason and reported him to the imperial court. The Central Protector of the Army repeatedly pressure Li Xiang, and he reluctantly agreed to serve as Cavalry Commandant of the Central Army. At one point, he also served as a general under the Colonel of Eastern Qiang Tribes.

In addition to his martial talents, Li Xiang was also extraordinarily strong, leading people to compare him to the Jin general, Wen Yang. As the capital, Luoyang became strife with political upheaval, he decided to resign from his post and return to Lueyang. Li Xiang had built a chilvarous reputation for himself by readily helping others in need, so he attracted many followers in the area to join him.

=== Exodus to Yi province and joining Zhao Xin ===
However, around the same time, the Guanzhong region was in turmoil due to the rebellion of Qi Wannian (296–299) and prolonged famines. Six commanderies, including Lüeyang and Tianshui, were ravaged, displacing tens of thousands of families. Many of them fled south to Liang and Yi provinces in search of food. Li Xiang and his brothers were among these refugees, and along the way, Li Xiang would often provide aid in his camp to people suffering from hunger or illness. His actions made the Li brothers very popular with the Six Commanderies refugees as they entered Yi province.

In 300, the Inspector of Yi province, Zhao Xin plotted to declare independence in the Ba-Shu region and attempted to win over the refugees by distributing food from the government treasury. When he met Li Xiang, Zhao Xin was impressed by his character and agreed on his ideas whenever they discuss military strategy. Zhao praised him by remarking, "Li Xuanxu is the Guan Yu and Zhang Fei of today." As Li Xiang's brothers were also known for their martial prowess, Zhao Xin also entrusted them as his allies.

When Zhao Xin finally launched his rebellion, Li Xiang and his allies brought 4,000 cavalrymen to formally surrender to him. Zhao Xin appointed him as a Divisional Commander. Li Xiang recruited soldiers among the Six Commanderies refugees, commanding over 10,000 men. When the Qiang people rebelled against Zhao Xin, Li Xiang led his army to suppress them. For his achievements, he was promoted to General Who Awes Invaders and bestowed him the title of Marquis of Yangqiu Village. To defend from potential Jin attacks, Zhao Xin had Li Xiang block the northern roads. Through his previous experiences as a general, Li Xiang established clear military laws, and instead of a banner, he would use a spear to direct his troops. He also established firm discipline within his army, executing three of his subordinates who disobeyed his orders.

=== Fallout with Zhao Xin and death ===
By 301, Li Xiang's growing popularity and powerful army made Zhao Xin secretly resentful of him, although he initially did not voice his concerns. Eventually, at the advice of his aides, Du Shu (杜淑) and Zhang Can (張粲), Zhao Xin was determined to eliminate Li Xiang. Coincidentally at the time, Li visited his camp and requested an audience, which Zhao happily agreed. Seeking to understand Zhao's intentions, Li bowed and said, "The Middle Kingdom is in great turmoil without order or structure left, and the Jin can never be restored. Your Majesty's virtues are as vast as Heaven and Earth, and your benevolence extends throughout the land. The deeds of Tang and Wu are in dire need today. We should strike at the opportune time, heed the will of the people and save them from their suffering, so that they know who they can turn to. Not only will Yong and Shu be at peace, but so too the rest of the world."

However, Zhao Xin angrily replied, "These are not the words of a subject!" After discussing with Du Shu and the others, Li Xiang's actions were deemed "highly treasonous" and he was sentenced to death along with his son and thirty other clan members. The refugees of the Six Commanderies all mourned his death, and soon, Li Te and his brothers led their armies to overthrow Zhao Xin. When his nephew, Li Xiong established the Cheng-Han dynasty in 304, Li Xiang was posthumously given the title of "Prince Wu of Liang".
