= Li Te =

Spiritual founder of Cheng-Han

Li Te 李特
- ruler of Cheng-Han
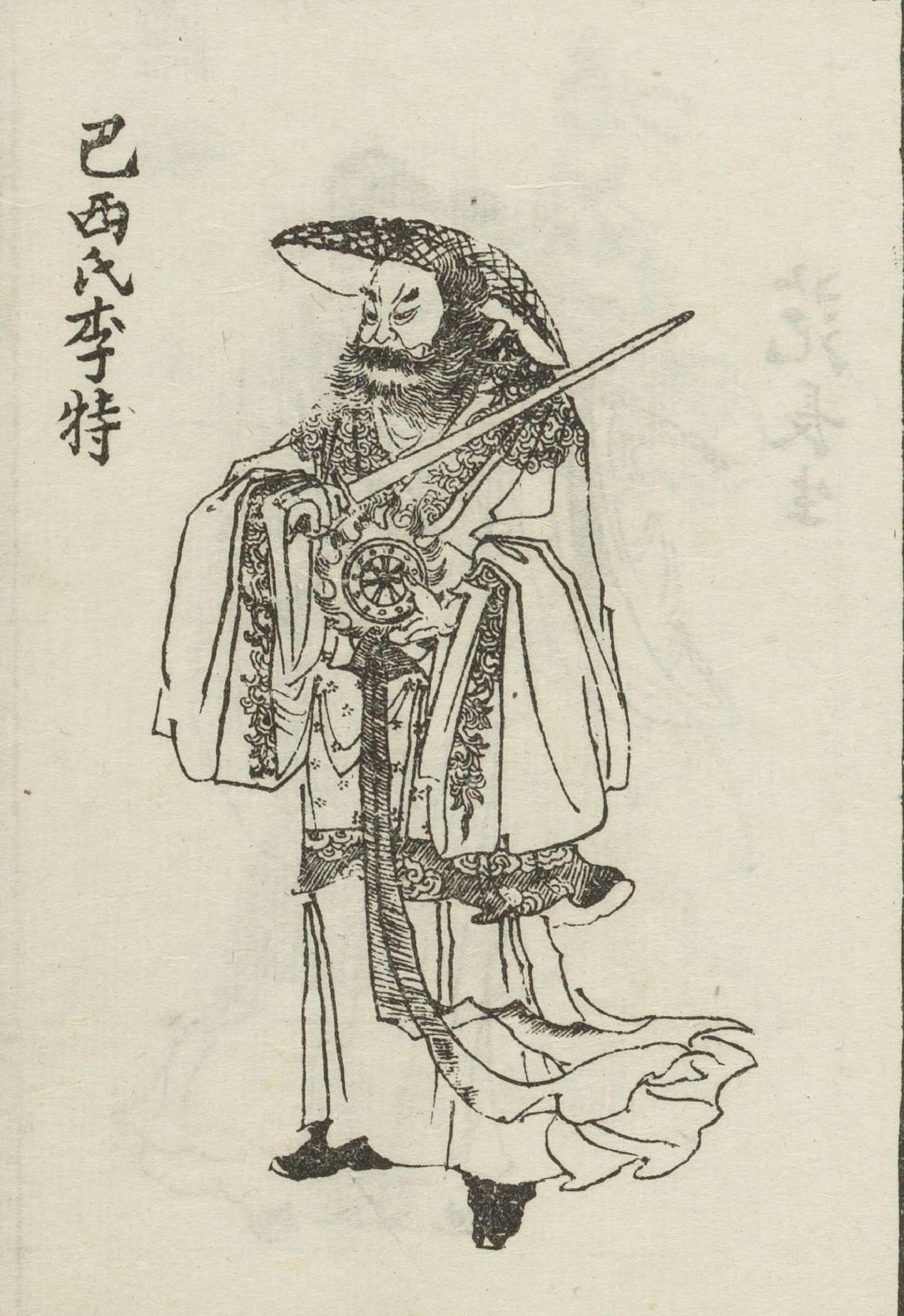

ruler of Cheng-Han
- Reign: 303
- Successor: Li Liu
- Born: 240s
- Died: 303
Full name
- Family name: Li (李; lǐ); Given name: Te (特, Tè)
Era name and dates
- Jiànchū (建初): 303
Regnal name
- Acting Grand General Who Guards the North (行鎮北大將軍)
Posthumous name
- Emperor Jǐng (景皇帝, lit. "Splendid")
Temple name
- Shizu (始祖, shǐ zǔ)
- Dynasty: Cheng-Han

Li Te (李特, 240s - c.March 303), courtesy name Xuanxiu (玄休), posthumously King Jing of Chengdu (成都景王) and later Emperor Jing (景皇帝), was the spiritual founder of the Ba Di-led Cheng-Han dynasty during the Sixteen Kingdoms period of Chinese history. Under the ruling Jin dynasty (266–420), he and many people from present-day Gansu sought refuge in Yizhou due to Qi Wannian's rebellion. In 300, he ousted the rebelling provincial Inspector, Zhao Xin, and established a strong presence in the region. He initially agreed to coexist with the new Inspector, Luo Shang, but due to conflicting interests, they eventually went to war with each other. Li Te had the upper hand early on, and in 303, he hinted at the formation of a new state. However, before he could do so, he was abruptly killed in an ambush by Jin forces. Regardless, his younger brother Li Liu and his son Li Xiong continued the war, with the latter finally forcing Luo Shang out from the provincial capital, Chengdu in 304. Li Xiong established the state of Cheng (later named Han in 338), and posthumously honoured his father as a king and later an emperor.

== Background and early life ==
Li Te's ancestors were Zong (賨) or Bandun people originally from Baxi commandery (巴西郡; around present-day Langzhong, Sichuan). After Cao Cao captured Hanzhong during the end of the Han dynasty, his grandfather Li Hu (李虎) led his people north to submit to Cao Cao. Because of this, Li Te's family began living in Lüeyang Commandery (略陽郡; in modern Tianshui, Gansu), where they mingled with the local Di tribes. Li Te and others similar to him were referred to as the Ba Di, Ba being the region that their ancestors originated from. Li Te was the second of five sons of Li Mu (李慕). He was described as 8 chi tall (6 ft 2) and displayed martial talents such as horseback archery.

In 296, a Di chieftain named Qi Wannian led a major revolt around Li Te's area. The land was struck by famines and military occupation, so many of its inhabitants decided to migrate including Li Te, who led his followers back to his ancestral homeland in Yizhou. While passing through Jian'ge Pass (劍閣關, in modern Guangyuan, Sichuan), he was marvelled by the sturdy defenses that the region possessed, saying, "Liu Shan had such defenses as this, and yet he still gave himself over in surrender to others. How could he not have been a man of inferior talents?"

== Zhao Xin's rebellion ==
At the start of the 4th century in 300, the Inspector of Yizhou, Zhao Xin rebelled against the Jin dynasty and declared himself Grand General and Governor of Yizhou. Among the first to support him was Li Te's brother, Li Xiáng, who brought along Te and their other brothers, Li Liu and Li Xiāng (note the different pinyin), to join as well. Zhao made Xiáng his General Who Vanquishes Invaders and had him defend the northern passages. However, Li Xiáng became gradually popular and displayed exceptional discipline over his army, which made Zhao Xin wary about him and his ambitions. In 301, after Li Xiáng visited him in the provincial capital, Chengdu and urged him to take the imperial throne, Zhao Xin accused him of treason and had him killed alongside his sons, nephews and kinsmen.

When Li Xiáng was killed, Li Te and Li Liu had stayed behind to guard the north with his soldiers. Wanting to keep their loyalty, Zhao Xin sent messengers to console the brothers and tried to justify his actions, even appointing them as generals. However, the pair were furious and led their forces towards Chengdu through Mianzhu. Zhao Xin ordered his forces to garrison at Shiting in Mianzhu, but Li Te launched a successful night raid on their camp, setting fire to it and killing many of the soldiers before continuing towards Chengdu. Li Te's arrival threw the city into panic, and many of Zhao Xin's officials abandoned him. Zhao Xin and his family fled on a small boat, but they were later killed at Guangdu (廣都; in modern Shuangliu District, Sichuan) by a subordinate. Li Te entered Chengdu, sacking the city before sending a list of crimes that Zhao Xin had committed to the Jin capital in Luoyang.

== Opposing orders to return north ==
Despite Li Te's attempt to establish friendly relations with the Jin court, the court dispatched an army led by Luo Shang in order to crush Li Te and his forces. Li Te sent his brother Li Xiāng to welcome Luo Shang along the road and gift him with presents. Luo Shang was pleased and accepted his token of friendship in spite of objections from his subordinates Wang Dun (王敦, not to be confused with the more famous Wang Dun) and Xin Ran (辛冉). Luo Shang even made Li Xiāng his own officer, but suspicion between the two sides remained.

Meanwhile, in the north, the court issued an order calling for the refugees that had fled during Qi Wannian's rebellion to return to their respective provinces. However, Li Te's brother, Li Fu (李輔), who was in Qinzhou and had just arrived in Shu around the time, notified his brother that the north was still in disarray. Li Te thus sent Yan Shi (閻式) along with bribes to Luo Shang to extend their stay to autumn, which Luo Shang permitted. Li Te was later named General Who Displays Might and made a marquis, but the court also unpopularly refused to reward those who had helped Li Te in quelling Zhao Xin. This was proposed by Luo Shang's subordinate Xin Ran, which caused the refugees to resent him.

As autumn approached, Luo Shang made preparations to send back the refugees, but they were still anxious to return. Li Te sent Yan Shi again to negotiate their stay till winter, but this time Luo Shang rejected. Even after Yan Shi persuaded Luo's subordinate, Du Tao to remonstrate him, Luo Shang refused to change his mind. Li Te was becoming increasingly popular and was bringing in more refugees under his care by the day, so he continued to pester Luo Shang for an extension. Xin Ran, angered by the whole situation, finally took action by setting up notices demanding for the Li family's heads. Li Te acquired these notices and edited them by saying that Xin Ran not only wanted the Li family dead, but also the other major families among the refugees. The forged notices quickly caught the refugees' attention and caused further unrest, leading to many of them banding with Li Te for protection.

== War with Luo Shang ==
At the advice of Yan Shi, Li Te readied himself for war. Xin Ran and Li Bi (李苾) also decided to take matters into their own hands. Without Luo Shang knowing, they sent Ceng Yuan (曾元) and others to carry out a surprise attack on Li Te's camp. When Luo Shang found out, he immediately supported Xin Ran and sent Tian Zuo (田佐) to reinforce Ceng Yuan. Li Te kept his composure during the attack. He allowed half of the enemies to enter his camp before ambushing them with no escape. Li Te killed Ceng Yuan and the other generals, sending their heads to Luo Shang and Xin Ran as a warning.

The refugees acclaimed Li Te as General Who Guards The North after the war broke out. Li Te appointed his brothers with offices before assaulting Xin Ran at Guanghan County. Luo Shang had sent reinforcements to help Xin Ran, but they were too afraid to engage Li Te in battle. Xin Ran was defeated multiple times before retreating to Deyang County, allowing Li Te to occupy Guanghan. Li Te proceeded to give out more appointments to his family members and members of the powerful refugee families. Meanwhile, Luo Shang was at a disadvantage as the people of Yizhou all favored Li Te over him at the time, so to compensate, he strengthen his defenses and fought Li Te to a stalemate while calling for reinforcements.

In 302, the Prince of Hejian, Sima Yong sent Ya Bo (衙博) to Zitong to assist Luo Shang in putting down Li Te. Luo Shang ordered his Protector, Zhang Gui (張龜) to march to Fancheng, so Li Te went to face Zhang while his son Li Dang fought with Ya Bo. Li Te routed Zhang Gui and received the surrender of Zitong and Baxi. Li Dang drove out Ya Bo and received his soldiers' surrender. With his latest victory, Li Te proclaimed himself Grand General, Governor of Yizhou, and Chief Controller of Liangzhou and Yizhou.

In autumn, Li Te attacked Zhang Wei (張微) but was repelled and had his own camp besieged instead. Li Dang came to his father's rescue and turned away Zhang Wei. Li Te wanted to retreat but through his son's advice, decided to attack again. This time, he managed to kill Zhang Wei. He also fought with the Inspector of Liangzhou, Xu Xiong (許雄) numerous times, winning in every bout between the two. Li Te's territories and influence only grew, which distressed both Luo Shang and the Jin court.

Li Te finally reached Chengdu through the rivers in January 303, catching Luo Shang's troops by surprise. He occupied the lesser city of Chengdu and captured the horses but did not carry out any further plunder. Instead, he granted an amnesty and declared a new reign era. With the situation dying down, Luo Shang, who was in the Greater City of Chengdu, decided to negotiate peace with Li Te, which Te agreed. Li Liu and Shangguan Dun (上官惇) were doubtful of the peace talks, telling Li Te in a letter, "Accepting a surrender is like receiving an enemy." At the start of the war, many in the Shu region moved into fortifications to defend themselves. Although Li Te treated them kindly, Li Liu pointed out to his brother that people living in these fortifications may not be loyal as they seem, and urged him to force them into sending hostages. Li Te simply ignored these warnings and scolded them.

== Death and posthumous honours ==
Li Te's life would come to an abrupt and brutal end. The Jin court had ordered reinforcements from Jingzhou to help Luo Shang, so Li Te sent Li Dang and a few others to defend Deyang. A subordinate of Luo Shang, Ren Rui (任叡) plotted with Luo to ambush Li Te. After the two men slipped out from Chengdu, Ren Rui went to the fortifications to get them to join their attack. Ren Rui then feigned surrender to Li Te and provided misinformation about Luo Shang's situation. Soon, he asked Li Te for permission to allow him to return to Chengdu so that he could visit his family, and Li permitted him. Once he returned, he revealed to Luo Shang about Li Te's plans. In February 303, Luo Shang, with the help from the fortifications, made a surprise attack on Li Te's camp. With so little troops, Li Te fought for two days before dying alongside Li Fu and Li Yuan (李遠). Their bodies were burnt and their heads were sent back to the capital.

Li Te's sudden death shook the rebel army, but they were quick to elect Li Liu as their new leader. After Li Liu died later in 303, Li Te's son, Li Xiong would succeed to his position. Under the leadership of the two, the rebels would drive out the Jin forces from the regions of Ba and Shu. Li Xiong established his state of Cheng in 304, becoming the first of the Sixteen Kingdoms. Li Xiong originally called himself a king, so he posthumously honoured his father King Jing of Chengdu (成都景王). After Li Xiong declared himself emperor in 306, Li Te's title was thus changed to Emperor Jing (景皇帝).

== Family ==
- Father
  - Li Mu (second son of)
- Wife
  - Empress Dowager Luo
- Children
  - Li Shi (李始), eldest son by concubine
  - Li Dang (李蕩), died during Li Liu's reign in 303
  - Li Xiong (李雄), first emperor of Cheng-Han
