= Qiao Deng =

Jin dynasty general

- 譙登

Administrator of Zitong (梓潼太守)
- In office ?–311
- Monarch: Emperor Huai of Jin

Personal details
- Born: Unknown Langzhong, Sichuan
- Died: 311 Chengdu, Sichuan
- Relations: Qiao Zhou (grandfather)
- Parent: Qiao Xian (father)
- Courtesy name: Shenming (慎明)

Qiao Deng (died 311), courtesy name Shenming, was a military general of the Jin dynasty (266–420). After his father was killed by Cheng-Han forces, Qiao Deng volunteered himself to lead Jin reinforcements into the Ba-Shu region to exact revenge on his father's killer. He was successful, but as Jin forces were being driven out, he and his followers held out in Fucheng for two years. He was eventually captured, and the emperor of Cheng, Li Xiong ordered his execution.

== Life ==
=== Background ===
Qiao Deng was the grandson of the famous Shu Han scholar, Qiao Zhou, and while records do not explicitly name him, his father was in all likelihood Qiao Xian (譙賢). (Note: Qiao Zhou's biography in the Sanguozhi states that he had three sons: Qiao Xi (譙熙), Qiao Xian (譙賢) and Qiao Tong (譙同). Qiao Xi and Qiao Tong are mentioned in Qiao Zhou's biography in the Huayang Guozhi as his uncles, leaving Qiao Xian as his father.) When he was young, Qiao Deng was known for being honest and loyal. He was appointed an Officer of Merit in Baxi Commandery and later appointed a Registrar and aide-de-camp in Liang province. He was then transferred to Administrator of Yinping Commandery. During his time in Yinping, the Five Officials (五官掾) were appointed by the local gentry families and notoriously oppressed the Han and Qiang people in the area. In response, Qiao Deng had the Five Officials killed and brought stability to the commandery.

=== Avenging his father ===
In 301, refugees in the Ba-Shu region, led by the Ba Di leader, Li Te rebelled against the Western Jin dynasty. In 304, his son, Li Xiong ousted the provincial inspector, Luo Shang out from Chengdu and established the Cheng-Han dynasty. When Qiao Deng's hometown of Baxi fell to Cheng around this time, his father was killed by Cheng Administrator of Baxi, Ma Tuo (馬脫). Qiao Deng traveled east to Jing province where he requested the inspector, Liu Hong for soldiers to carry out his revenge. However, because the Central Plains was in turmoil, he was unable to receive his soldiers for three years.

In the end, Liu Hong recommended him as General Who Spread Vehemence and Interior Minister of Zitong and granted him permission to recruit volunteers. Qiao Deng was able to gather 2,000 refugees from the Ba-Shu region to fight for his cause. In 309, he led them to Ba Commandery, where Luo Shang was camped to ask him for more troops to fight Li Xiong, but to no avail. Nonetheless, Qiao Deng attacked Dangqu and killed Ma Tuo, going as far as eating his liver.

=== Defense of Fucheng ===
Qiao Deng returned to Ba to ask Luo Shang for troops again. Luo Shang's advisors and subordinates all felt there was nothing to gain from granting his request. Qiao Deng became angry and berated them, even placing the blame of the whole situation on Luo Shang, but Luo Shang did nothing more than dismissed him. Meanwhile, the Cheng general, Li Li was killed by Luo Yang (羅羕), who then offered to surrender Zitong to Jin. Qiao Deng responded by marching to Fucheng, during which he repelled an attack from Li Xiong.

In 310, the Cheng general, Li Xiang attacked Qiao Deng at Fucheng. By this point, Luo Shang had already died. His son, Luo Yu (羅宇) and the rest of his staff all hated Qiao Deng, and so they cut off his food supply. When Luo Shang's replacement, Pi Su (皮素) heard of their inaction, he was furious and planned to punished them, but Luo Yu killed him first when he arrived at Ba. In turn, Luo Yu was the killed by the Commandant of Jianping, Bao Zhong (暴重), throwing Ba into chaos. Pi Su's generals, Zhang Shun (張順) and Yang Xian (楊顯), who were sent to assist Qiao Deng, also withdrew when they knew of he had died.

Realizing that no reinforcements were coming to Fucheng, Li Xiang intensified his assault. A famine broke out in the city, and the inhabitants resorted to eating mice. Although many starved to death, it was said that no one defected. Earlier, Qiao Deng had brought with him to Fucheng Li Xiang's son, Li Shou, who was captured by Luo Shang in 304, hoping to entice his father. Now that he was surrounded with no where to go, Qiao Deng decided to return Li Shou to Li Xiang. In the end, Fucheng fell to Cheng in 311.

=== Death and posthumous event ===
Qiao Deng was captured in the aftermath and sent to Chengdu before Li Xiong. Initially, Li Xiong wanted to treat him Qiao Deng with mercy, but he spoke impassionedly and cried uncontrollably. Convinced that Qiao Deng would never surrender, he had him executed in the end.

The Huayang Guozhi tells of a story that after his death, his former soldiers were all turned into slaves and distributed among the soldiers of Cheng. Afterwards, there were only clouds and rain for more than a hundred day. Li Xiong believed that he had angered Qiao Deng's spirit by mistreating his soldiers, so he declared an amnesty pardoning the soldiers.
