= Luo Shang =

Chinese Jin dynasty general (died 310)

- 羅尚

Inspector of Yizhou (益州刺史)
- In office 300 – 310

Personal details
- Born: Unknown Xiangyang, Hubei
- Died: 310 Chongqing, Sichuan
- Relations: Luo Xian (uncle)
- Children: Luo Yu; Luo Yanshou
- Parent: Luo Shi
- Occupation: Military general, politician
- Courtesy name: Jingzhi (敬之); Jingzhen (敬真)
- Posthumous name: Marquis of Yiling (夷陵侯)

Luo Shang (died c.August 310), courtesy name Jingzhi, also called Luo Zhong, courtesy name Jingzhen, was a Chinese military general and politician of the Jin dynasty. In 300, the Jin court appointed him the Inspector of Yizhou and sent him to quell the rebellion of the previous officeholder, Zhao Xin. However, before Luo Shang arrived in the province, the refugee leader, Li Te, had ousted Zhao Xin from power. Luo Shang and Li Te attempted to coexist, but due to conflicting interests, the two men went to war with each other in 301. In 304, Li Te's son, Li Xiong, drove him out from provincial capital, Chengdu, allowing the Li clan to establish the Cheng-Han dynasty in the Ba and Shu regions. Luo Shang continued to resist Cheng-Han from Ba Commandery (巴郡; present-day Chongqing), but after his death in 310, Cheng was able to consolidate its power in southwest China.

== Early life and career ==
Luo Shang was from Xiangyang and his father Luo Shi (羅式), who was Administrator of Zangke, died when he was still very young. Luo Shang was thus adopted by his uncle Luo Xian, the famed general of Shu Han who defended Yong'an from 30,000 Eastern Wu soldiers. Luo Shang inherited his uncle's talents in writing articles and found himself a position as Army Adviser together with Liu Qiao, under the Inspector of Jingzhou, Wang Rong. He partook in Jin's conquest of Wu in 279, in which he was ordered to attack Wuchang. Towards the end of the Tai'kang era (280-289) of Emperor Wu's reign, he was appointed as Inspector of Liangzhou.

== Inspector of Yizhou ==
=== Establishing ties with Li Te ===
In 300, during the reign of Emperor Hui of Jin, the Inspector of Yizhou, Zhao Xin rebelled against Jin in hopes of starting his own state. Hearing this, Luo Shang quickly wrote a petition to the Jin court volunteering himself to put down the rebellion. The court agreed, and Luo Shang was made the new Inspector of Yizhou. However, Luo Shang would not be the one to defeat Zhao Xin, rather it was a Ba Di refugee named Li Te, who had originally joined Zhao but later turned on him. Along the way to Chengdu the following year, Luo Shang was openly welcomed by Li Te and presented with gifts. Luo Shang accepted the gifts and later made Li Te's brother, Li Xiang as his Cavalry Commander. However, Luo Shang's advisors, Xin Ran (辛冉) and Wang Dun (王敦, not to be confused with the more famous Wang Dun from the Wang clan of Langya), objected to his decisions and cautioned him against Li Te. Luo Shang chose to ignore them, but suspicion between the two sides persisted. (Note: Xin Ran had previously convinced Sima Rong not to execute his half-brother Sima Lun's confidant Sun Xiu. He would later serve under Liu Hong; when he recommended that Liu should attempt to break away from Jin, an angered Liu had him executed.)

=== Refugee issue in Yizhou ===
Later in 301, the Jin court in Luoyang issued an order to all refugees in Yizhou to return north to their original homes in Yongzhou and Qinzhou (秦州, modern eastern Gansu). Many of the refugees refused to abide this as they received news that the north was still in disarray. Li Te decided to send his subordinate Yan Shi (閻式) along with bribes to Luo Shang to negotiate their stay until autumn, which Luo Shang permitted. As autumn approached, Luo Shang began making preparations to send the refugees back, but the refugees were still reluctant to leave. Li Te sent Yan Shi again to negotiate with Luo Shang but this time he did not permit. Luo Shang's popularity deteriorated further after he followed Xin Ran's advice of introducing checkpoints in Zitong to confiscate goods held by the refugees, with the reasoning that the refugees had stolen the goods from Chengdu when ousting Zhao Xin.

Li Te had Yan Shi meet with Luo Shang for one last time, but was once more fruitless. Meanwhile, Xin Ran, frustrated at Li Te's persistence, started placing bounties on Li Te's family, but Li Te used this against him by editing the notices to make it seem that he also wanted the other major refugee families dead. The notices caused many of the refugees to band themselves with Li Te for protection, allowing him to amass a large under him. At this point, war between Li Te and Luo Shang was inevitable.

== War with Li Te ==
=== Early defeats ===
Luo Shang's side would be the first to act, although without his knowledge. Xin Ran and Li Bi (李苾) personally ordered Ceng Yuan (曾元) and others to attack Li Te's camp. After being informed, Luo Shang backed their decision and sent Tian Zuo (田佐) to strengthen their attack. However, Li Te routed Luo Shang's forces and sent their generals' heads as a warning. Li Te then proceeded to attack Guanghan Commandery (廣漢郡; around present-day Guanghan, Sichuan) where Xin Ran was based. Luo Shang ordered Li Bi and Fei Yuan (費遠) to rescue Xin Ran but they were defeated. The county soon fell, and Xin Ran fled to Deyang County as Li Te's forces advanced to Chengdu.

Luo Shang's unpopular administration had caused many people to support Li Te over him. Because of this, Luo Shang decided to heavily rely on his defences, fortifying it and fighting Li Te to a stalemate. Meanwhile, he also called for reinforcements from Liangzhou. The following year, aid arrived in the form of Ya Bo (衙博), who marched into Zitong, so Luo Shang coordinated with Ya Bo by sending Zhang Gui (張龜) to Fancheng. However, Zhang Gui was defeated by Li Te while Ya Bo was forced into retreating by Li Te's son, Li Dang. After this victory, Li Te challenged Luo Shang's position of Inspector of Yizhou by proclaiming himself the Governor of Yizhou.

The armies of Li Liu and Li Xiang arrived at the outskirts of Chengdu later that year. Luo Shang sent an army to fight him, but they were routed. Luo Shang had his general Zhang Xing (張興) to feign surrender and scout Li Te's army. Once he returned and informed Luo Shang, Zhang Xing went back to Li Te's camp with thousands of Luo Shang's strongest soldiers during the night. They killed Li Pan (李攀) and routed Li Xiang, but Li Xiang returned with Li Liu's army to defeat Zhang Xing. Many of Luo Shang's men died that night, and most their equipment were abandoned.

=== Ambushing Li Te ===
In early 303, Li Te also arrived and took the Lesser City section of Chengdu. After Te declared a new reign era, Luo Shang sent his agents to negotiate peace with Te. Many of Li Te's generals doubted Luo Shang's intentions, but he ignored their concerns and thought nothing more. While they were discussing, Jin forces from Jingzhou led by Sun Fu (孫阜) and Zong Dai (宗岱) made their way to Yizhou to help Luo Shang. It was then when Luo Shang's subordinate, Ren Rui (任叡) proposed to him a plan to ambush Li Te. One night, Luo Shang and Ren Rui secretly slipped out of the city. Ren Rui then went to the fortifications around Chengdu to share his plans and get the local leaders to join. Ren Rui later surrendered to Li Te and lied to him about Luo Shang's situation. Finally, Li Te, believing Ren Rui's excuse of wanting to see his family, allowed him to return to Chengdu, where Ren revealed to Luo about important information he received from Li Te. In February or March 303, Luo Shang and the fortification leaders ambushed Li Te's camp. Li Te fought desperately for two days but died in the end alongside Li Fu (李輔) and Li Yuan (李遠). Luo Shang had their bodies burnt and sent their heads to the capital.

== War with Li Liu and Li Xiong ==
=== War with Li Liu ===
Li Te's sudden death rocked the rebel army. Many of their generals did not know what to do, so they retreated to Chizu (赤祖, in present day Mianzhu, Sichuan), where they elected Li Te's brother Li Liu as the new leader. Luo Shang took advantage of the confusion by sending He Chong (何沖) and Chang Shen (常深) to attack Chizu. A native named Yao Shen (藥紳) also rose up in support of Luo Shang. As the two sides fought, the Di chieftains, Fu Cheng (苻成) and Kui Bo (隗伯) defected over to He Chong. Li Liu's camp was on the verge of falling but against all odds, Li Liu managed to not only repel Luo Shang's forces, but also the traitors within his camp. Li Liu capitalised on his victory by putting Chengdu under siege.

Sun Fu and Zong Dai's reinforcements did not arrive as Sun Fu was defeated by Li Xiong and Zong Dai died of natural causes. Luo Shang's subordinate Xu Yu (徐轝) begged him to ally with the Taoist hermit at Mount Qingcheng, Fan Changsheng, as he had thousands of families under his wing. Luo Shang refused, and this backfired as Xu Yu defected in anger to Li Liu, who told Liu about Changsheng. As a result, Li Liu was able to restock his supplies to continue fighting.

=== War with Li Xiong ===
Li Liu died during the winter of 303. Before his death, he chose his nephew, Li Te's son Li Xiong to succeed him. Upon his succession, Li Xiong sent a man named Pu Tai (朴泰) to trick Luo Shang into attacking Picheng (郫城, in present-day Pixian County, Sichuan). Luo Shang ordered Kui Bo to attack the city during the night but he was defeated by Li Xiang. Li Xiang then led his army to Chengdu and pretended to be Kui Bo by shouting at the gates, "We had already taken Picheng!" As it was too dark, Luo Shang believed he was Kui Bo and allowed them entry into the city. Before he could realize, Li Xiang and his men had already swarmed into the Lesser City. Luo Shang holed himself up in the Greater City section of Chengdu.

Li Xiong intensified his attack on Chengdu. Luo Shang's food supply had been cut off after Li Xiang captured Qianwei, leaving the city with little to no ration. In 304, Luo Shang entrusted Zhang Luo (張羅) to hold the city while he fled during the night. However, Chengdu eventually fell to Li Xiong, allowing him to officially break away from Jin and form his state of Cheng. Luo Shang reached Jiangyang, where he sent a letter to the Jin court about the situation in Yizhou. He also asked the Inspector of Jingzhou, Liu Hong for supplies.

== Commanding from Ba Commandery ==
With the fall of Chengdu, Luo Shang based himself at Ba Commandery. He sent his men to raid the Shu region and captured Li Xiang's wife Lady Zan (昝氏) and their child Li Shou in the process. By 307, Luo Shang had established his camps and defenses around Yizhou. As many were fleeing from Jingzhou to Yizhou at the time, he set up new counties and commanderies for the refugees to settle in to dissuade them from returning. Despite his early failures, the court rewarded Luo Shang with Cavalier In Regular Attendance and Commander of Yizhou and Liangzhou in 308.

=== Campaign against Cheng (309–310) ===
In 309, Luo Shang began a campaign against Cheng after he received the surrender of Zitong Commandery. Li Xiong sent Li Xiang, Li Yun (李雲) and Li Huang (李璜) to retake the commandery, but Luo Shang defeated them and killed Li Yun and Li Huang. Meanwhile, the Jin general, Qiao Deng, was marching west to attack Cheng and asked Luo Shang for troops, but he refused. Despite his rejection, Qiao Deng went ahead and captured Fucheng County from Cheng. Luo Shang also sent Xiang Fen (向奮) to camp at Anhan (安漢, in present-day Nanchong, Sichuan), where Li Xiong attacked him but to no avail. In 310, Luo Shang received the surrender of Baxi Commandery (巴西郡; in present-day Langzhong, Sichuan) from Wen Shi (文石).

=== Death and aftermath ===
Luo Shang died of natural causes in August 310 while his campaign was still ongoing, and his office of Inspector of Yizhou was succeeded by Pi Su (皮素). Despite the string of victories in 309 and early 310, Cheng was able to change the tide in the following months of 310. Before Luo Shang's death, Cheng's general, Zhang Bao (張寶), recaptured Zitong after feigning a surrender. Following his death, infighting began among the Jin generals. While Pi Su made his way to Ba, Luo Shang's son, Luo Yu (羅宇), who hated Qiao Deng, refused to send supplies to Fucheng. Pi Su was furious when he heard of Luo Yu's actions and wanted to punish him once he arrived in Ba. However, after arriving, Luo Yu killed Pi Su, and Luo Yu was then killed by the Commandant of Jianping, Bao Zhong (暴重).

Cheng took advantage of the situation in Ba to recover their lost territories. In c.February 311, Cheng reclaimed Baxi Commandery and Fucheng County, reversing Luo Shang's gains from the two previous years.
