= Langzhou =

Langzhou or Lang Prefecture may refer to:

- Langzhou (郎州), a former prefecture in roughly modern Qujing, Yunnan, China
- Langzhou (郎州), a former prefecture in roughly modern Zunyi, Guizhou, China
- Langzhou (閬州), a former prefecture in roughly modern Langzhong, Sichuan, China
- Langzhou (朗州), a former prefecture in roughly modern Changde, Hunan, China
