= Baoning =

Baoning is an atonal pinyin romanization of various Chinese words and names, and may refer to:

- Baoning Prefecture (保寧府), a former administrative division of Sichuan
- Baoning, Sichuan (保寧府), the seat of the former prefecture, now known as Langzhong
- Boryeong, a city in South Chungcheong Province, South Korea, known as "Baoning" in Chinese
