= LZG =

LZG may refer to:

- LZG, a GM High Value engine
- IATA code for Langzhong Gucheng Airport
