= Zhou Chu =

Jin Dynasty general (died 297)

- 周處
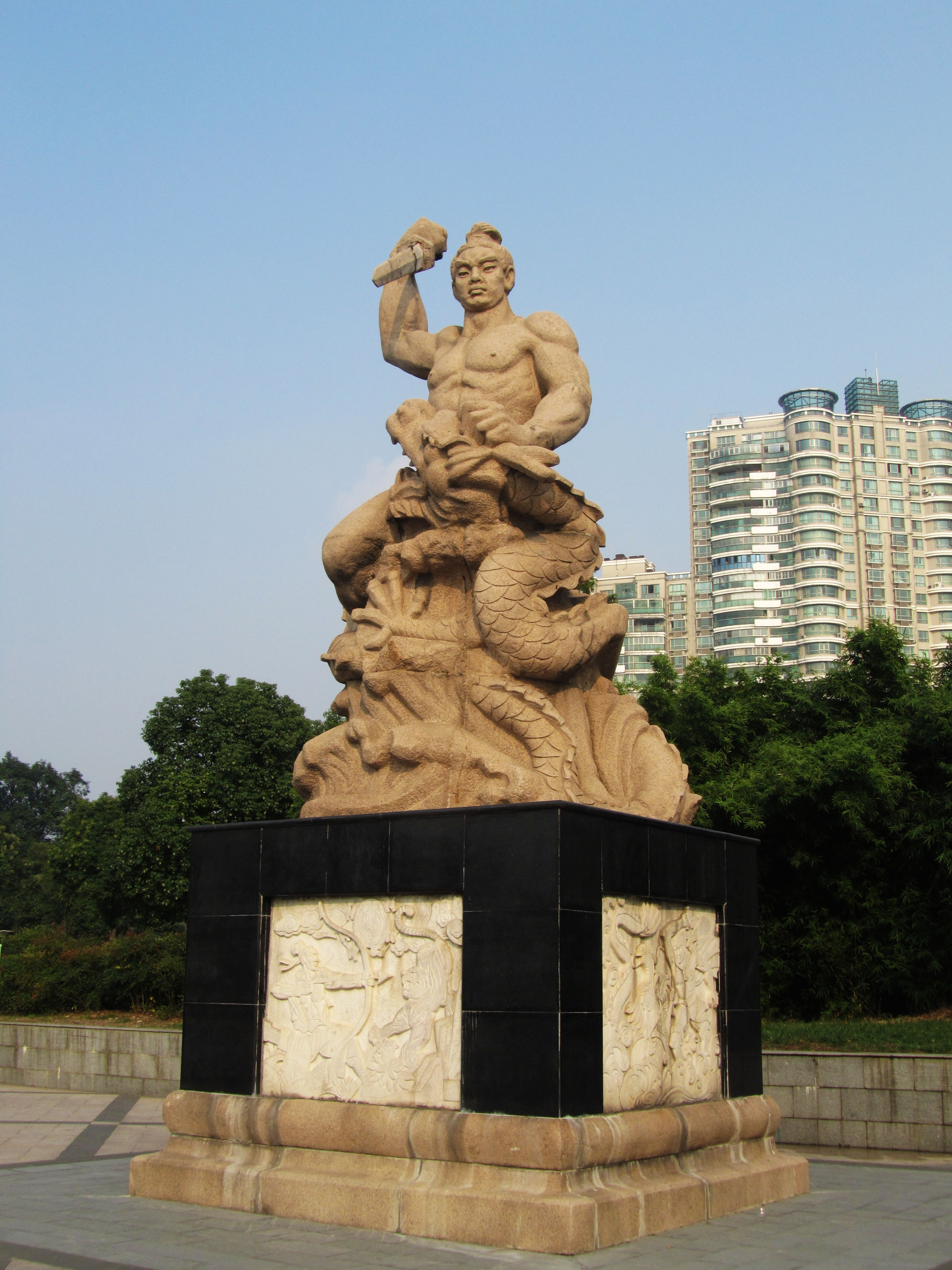
- Statue of Zhou Chu fighting a dragon in Yixing, Jiangsu

Palace Aide to the Censor-in-Chief (御史中丞)
- In office ? – 297
- Monarch: Emperor Hui of Jin

Personal details
- Born: 236? Yixing, Eastern Wu (present-day Jiangsu)
- Died: 12 February 297 (aged 60–61)
- Parent: Zhou Fang (father)
- Courtesy name: Ziyin (子隱)

Zhou Chu (traditional Chinese: 周處; simplified Chinese: 周处; 236? (Note: Historical sources did not record when Zhou Chu was born. Qing-era scholar Lao Ge in his Jin Shu Jiao Kan Ji ("Record on Cross-checking the Book of Jin") claimed that Zhou Chu was 62 (by East Asian reckoning) when he died, without citing his source. According to Sun Quan's and Zhou Fang's biographies in Sanguozhi, Zhou Fang was appointed Administrator of Poyang Commandery in early 226, and served in the commandery for about 13 years. Thus, Zhou Fang's death date should be in early 239. Zhou Chu's biography in Book of Jin mentioned that he was orphaned at a young age. Thus, he was not Zhou Fang's posthumous son. As such, his birth year should be in or before 238.) – 12 February 297), courtesy name Ziyin (子隱), was a Western Jin-era Chinese general. He was the son of Zhou Fang, a famous Eastern Wu general. He had a reputation for uprightness and integrity and is the protagonist of a famous Chinese legend, Zhou Chu Chu San Hai (周處除三害) or "Zhou Chu Eradicates the Three Scourges", in which he sought out to kill a tiger and dragon that terrorized his hometown. He participated in the campaign against Qi Wannian's Rebellion when he was forced by his superiors to fight the 70,000-strong enemy head-on with 5,000 soldiers and no supply. Zhou Chu died in a valiant last stand and was posthumously honoured by the Western and Eastern Jin courts.

Zhou Chu is depicted in the woodcut print Wu Shuang Pu (無雙譜, Table of Peerless Heroes) by Jin Guliang.

== Eradicating the Three Scourges ==
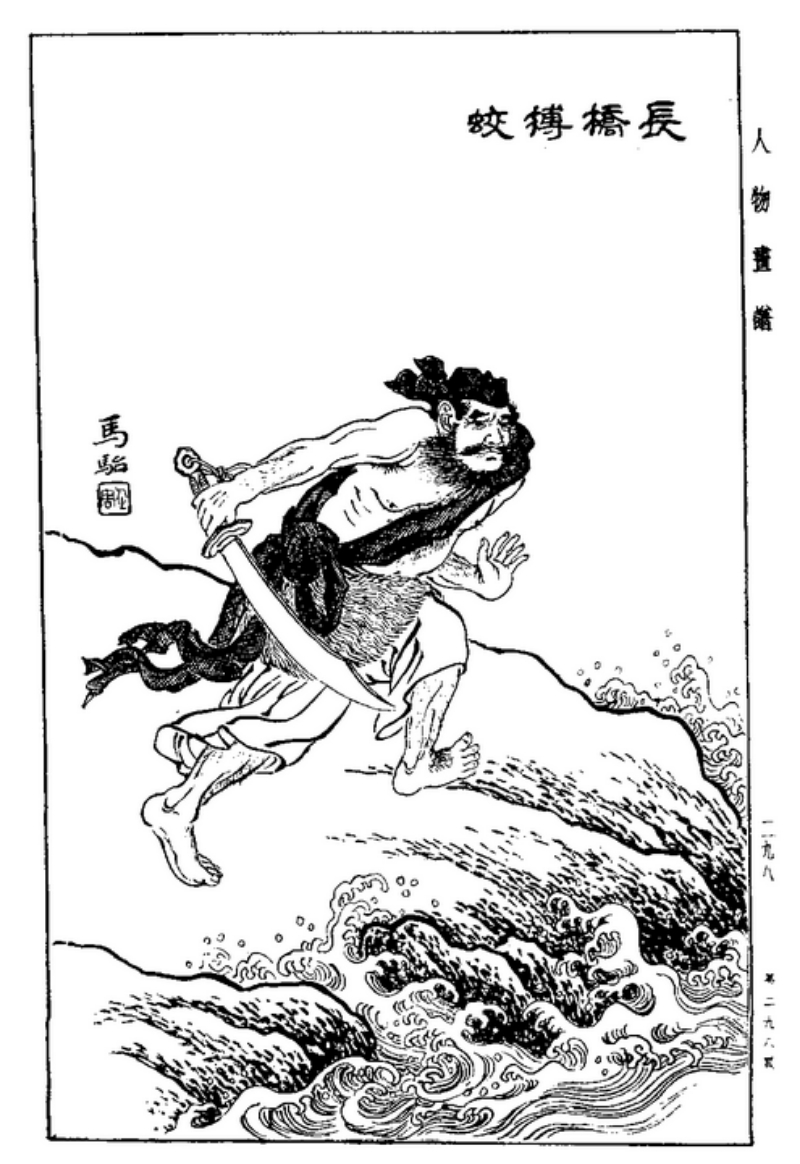
Zhou Chu as depicted in the Ma Tai Hua Bao (馬駘畫寶).

A folk story about Zhou Chu appeared in the 430 book A New Account of the Tales of the World and proved to be very popular. The story claims that Zhou Chu was such a cruel and violent ruffian in his younger days that he was called one of the "Three Scourges" by the villagers in his native Yixing County (present-day city of Yixing, Jiangsu), along with a tiger and a dragon.

Prompted by a villager, Zhou Chu took on the challenge to seek out and kill the tiger and the scaly dragon that lived in a stream (the jiao). (Note: The jiao 蛟. See Mather tr. and Chinese text.) His battle with this dragon endured for 3 days in Lake Tai, and the villagers were celebrating the demise of the two scourges when Zhou Chu returned triumphant with the dragon's head. That was when he realized that he was the last scourge that the villagers feared. Determined to mend his old ways, he sought out Eastern Wu generals Lu Ji and Lu Yun (陸雲), and received encouragement. Eventually he became an accomplished general beloved by his people.

== Death ==
Zhou Chu became Palace Aide to the Censor-in-Chief (御史中丞) and had no fear in indicting and exposing the wrongdoings of other ministers. He thus offended many, including Sima Rong (司馬肜), son of Sima Yi and an uncle of Sima Yan, founder of Western Jin. In 296, during the reign of Sima Zhong (Sima Yan's son and successor), when Sima Rong was named the Grand General of the Western expedition to quell Qi Wannian's rebellion, Zhou Chu was named the vanguard general. His fellow general Sun Xiu (孫秀) (Note: This Sun Xiu is a grandson of Sun Kuang, and should not be confused with Sima Lun's confidant of the same name.) warned him and suggested him to bid his aging mother a final farewell. Zhou Chu replied, "One cannot fulfill both filial piety and loyalty at the same time. Since I have already chosen to serve my country... I will die for it."

Zhou Chu was ordered to take 5,000 soldiers to attack the 70,000-strong enemy. After the attacks began, Sima Rong also ordered his supply to be cut off completely. Zhou's troops ran out of arrows and the generals assigned to reinforce him did not help. When asked to flee, Zhou Chu replied, "I am a minister of a nation. Isn't it proper to die for one's country?" He fought to his death.

After his death, Zhou Chu was posthumously appointed as General Who Pacifies the West. He had four sons, Zhou Jing (周靖), Zhou Qi, Zhou Zha and Zhou Shuo (周碩). Zhou Qi became a famous general south of the Yangzi during the fall of Western Jin, thrusting their clan into prominence. Following Emperor Yuan of Jin's ascension, Zhou Chu was given the posthumous name of "Xiao" (孝). Today, his tomb and a shrine dedicated to him can be found in Yixing, Jiangsu.
