= Baiya, Langzhong =

Baiya 柏垭镇
- Town
- Location within Sichuan
- Coordinates: 31.4558°N 105.9280°E
- Country: China
- Province: Sichuan
- Prefecture-level city: Nanchong
- County-level city: Langzhong

Population (2020)
  - Total: 22,158

Baiya (simplified Chinese: 柏垭镇; traditional Chinese: 柏埡鎮; pinyin: Bǎiyā Zhèn) is a town in the county-level city of Langzhong, Nanchong, Sichuan, China. As of 2020, Baiya has a population of 22,158 people.

== History ==
On August 2, 2005, the now-defunct townships of Gaoguan (Chinese: 高观乡), Jinyu (Chinese: 金鱼乡), and Yunong (Chinese: 裕农乡) were merged into Baiya.

== Administrative divisions ==
Baiya administers four residential communities and eight administrative villages.

=== Residential communities ===
Baiya contains the following four residential communities:

- Baiya Community (Chinese: 柏垭社区)
- Jinyu Community (Chinese: 金鱼社区)
- Yunong Community (Chinese: 裕农社区)
- Gaoguan Community (Chinese: 高观社区)

=== Administrative villages ===
Baiya contains the following eight administrative villages:

- Fulemiao Village (Chinese: 富乐庙村)
- Shangyou Village (Chinese: 上游村)
- Huxi Village (Chinese: 虎溪村)
- Chunfeng Village (Chinese: 淳风村)
- Laofangzui Village (Chinese: 老房嘴村)
- Lujiaoxi Village (Chinese: 鹿角溪村)
- Nandengguan Village (Chinese: 南登观村)
- Junqingsi Village (Chinese: 君庆寺村)

== Demographics ==
According to the 2020 Chinese Census, Baiya has a population of 22,158 people. 3.56% of Langzhong's total population lives in Baiya. The town's males comprised 51.18% percent of the population, while females comprised 48.82% of the population. 13.09% of the town's population is 14 years of age or younger, 49.76% is between the ages of 15 and 59, and 37.15% is 60 years of age or older. 29.72% of Baiya's population is 65 years of age or older.

=== Historical populations ===
As of the 2010 Chinese Census, Baiya had a population of 31,235, up from the 19,920 recorded in the 2000 Chinese Census. This increase is likely due to the expansion of the town of Baiya, which incorporated a number of now-defunct townships in 2005.

== See also ==
- List of township-level divisions of Sichuan
