= Zhao Xin (Jin dynasty) =

Military general and rebel of the Jin dynasty (266–420)

- 趙廞

Governor of Yi Province (益州牧) (Self-appointed)
- In office 300 – 301

Personal details
- Born: Unknown Shijiazhuang, Hubei
- Died: 301 Shuangliu District, Sichuan
- Children: Zhao Bing
- Courtesy name: Heshu (和叔)

Zhao Xin (died 301), courtesy name Heshu, was a military general and rebel of the Western Jin dynasty. A relative of Empress Jia Nanfeng, Zhao Xin rebelled and attempted to establish independence in Yi province after she was overthrown by the Prince of Zhao, Sima Lun in May 300. During his rebellion, he allied himself with Li Xiáng and the six commanderies refugees (六郡民流) of Guanzhong, but his suspicion led to his execution of Li Xiáng in 301. In retaliation, Li Xiáng's brothers, Li Te and Li Liu led their armies to attack Zhao Xin at Chengdu, causing him to flee; he was later killed by a subordinate.

== Early life and career ==
Zhao Xin's ancestors were from Anhan County (安漢縣), Baxi Commandery (巴西郡), which is in present-day Nanchong, Sichuan. They were followers of the Celestial Master, Zhang Lu in Hanzhong, and after Zhang Lu surrendered to Cao Cao and was relocated to Hebei in 215, his ancestors also decided follow him and settled down in Zhao Commandery. Zhao Xin was described as a person who values simplicity, yet was excessively extravagant in practice. He entered the service of the imperial court, and in succession served as the Magistrate of Chang'an County, Administrator of Tianmen Commandery, Administrator of Wuling Commandery (武陵郡; around present-day Changde, Hunan) and General Who Spreads Vehemence. The Prince of Zhao, Sima Lun appreciated his talents, and during his time in Wuling, Zhao Xin notably promoted a man named Pan Jing (潘京), who went on to become a renowned official.

In 296, Zhao Xin was appointed the Inspector of Yi province and General Who Breaks and Charges, although he only officially took up office in 298. At the time of his appointment, Qi Wannian's rebellion had broken out in the Guanzhong region to the north of Yi province, so Zhao Xin instructed the officials in Yi, Ma Xuan (馬玄) and Yin Fang (尹方) to assist in fighting the rebels. He also ordered to have the rice from the provincial capital, Chengdu be requisitioned as military supplies and sent to the Guanzhong by deer carts.

== Rebellion in Yi province ==
=== Early stages ===
In 300, Zhao Xin received an imperial edict summoning him to the Jin capital, Luoyang to serve as the Empress's Chamberlain while the Interior Minister of Chengdu, Geng Teng (耿滕) would replace him as the Inspector of Yi. However, Zhao Xin suspected that he was going to be executed, as he was related by marriage to and supported the empress and paramount leader, Jia Nanfeng, who had just been overthrown and killed by Sima Lun. There was a prophecy which stated "The Yellow Star is that of the king", and at the time, the stars within "Zhao state" (趙; same character as Zhao Xin's surname) constellation were shining bright. Seeing that the Jin government was in disarray, he began his plan to declare independence in the Shu region. (Note: Note that the Shu region was still nominally Sima Ying's fiefdom, due to his title of Prince of Chengdu.)

Due to Qi Wannian's rebellion, many refugees were entering Yi province from the Guanzhong region. Zhao Xin, in an attempt to win their support, distributed food from the government storehouses to the refugees. He also made the refugee leaders, the brothers Li Xiáng and Li Te, his subordinates and treated them exceptionally. However, the refugees became reliant on Zhao Xin's protection, and many of them became bandits and caused trouble for the locals of Shu. Geng Teng was unnerved by the situation that was unfolding and secretly sent petitions to the imperial court urging them to send the refugees back north out of fear they would rebel. Zhao Xin thus resented Geng Teng when he found out about these petitions.

=== Killing Geng Teng and Chen Xun ===
After the official edict arrived in Yi, Geng Teng was greeted and escorted by more than a thousand civil and military officials from the Lesser City to take up his post in the Greater City, where the affairs of Yi are managed. However, Zhao Xin refused to leave the Greater City and sent Li Xiang's generals, Luo An (羅安) and Wang Li (王利) to intimidate Geng Teng. Luo An and his allies raided Geng Teng at Xuanhua village in Guanghan Commandery and killed the edict bearer, but Geng Teng remained intent on entering the Greater City despite opposition from his advisor, Chen Xun (陳恂).

When Geng Teng entered the city through the western gate, Zhao Xin ordered his aide, Dai Mao (代茂) to capture him, but Dai Mao informed Geng Teng on what was about to happen and left instead. Nonetheless, Zhao Xin sent his soldiers to attack Geng Teng, defeating him several times which led to him killing himself by jumping off the Lesser City. Geng Teng's son, Geng Qi (耿奇) hid with a peasant named Song Ning (宋寧) through the help of the official, Zuo Xiong (左雄). Zhao Xin offered Song Ning a thousand gold to find Geng Qi, but he refused, allowing Geng Qi to later escape. All of Geng Teng's accompanying officials fled except for Chen Xun, who tied himself and presented himself before Zhao Xin requesting for Geng Teng's body, which was granted.

With Geng Teng dead, Zhao Xin then sent his soldiers against the Colonel of Western Yi Tribes, Chen Zong (陳總), who was also making his way for Chengdu. Chen Zong briefly stopped at Jiangyang when he heard about the situation. He then attempted to rush to Chengdu, but poor road conditions delayed his march, and when he reached Yufu Crossing (魚涪津) in Nan'an County (南安縣; in present-day Leshan, Sichuan), he was met with Zhao Xin's army. Chen Zong was reluctant to fight them despite the urging of his advisor, Zhao Mo (趙模), but at the same time, many of his soldiers were deserting him. Chen Zong fled to hide among the grass, while Zhao Mo, disguised as Chen Zong, led the remaining troops to attack but was killed in battle. When Zhao Xin's men found out that they had killed Zhao Mo instead, they went to search for Chen Zong and killed him as well.

=== Conflict with Li Xiang and his brothers ===
After eliminating Geng Teng and Chen Zong, Zhao Xin declared himself as Grand Chief Controller, Grand General and Governor of Yi province, and according to the Chronicles of Jin (晉春秋) by Du Yanye (杜延業), he also went as far as introducing a new era name, Taiping (太平). (Note: Although Sima Guang included this extract of Jin Chunqiu in Zizhi Tongjian Kaoyi, he did not include the era name "Taiping" in Tongjian, as said era name was not found in any other source which he had reviewed.) He also began appointing and dismissing officials within Yi, and many of the Jin imperial officials dared not ignore his summon. Li Xiáng brought with him the leaders of the refugee groups to visit Zhao Xin, who appointed him as General Who Awes Bandits and awarded him the title of Marquis of Yangqiu Village. Zhao Xin then ordered him to recruit soldiers from the refugees and block the roads leading to the north. As he had rebelled, his eldest son, Zhao Bing (趙昺), who was in Luoyang, was executed.

Though Zhao Xin treated Li Xiáng as a close ally at first, he soon grew wary of him as he became increasingly popular and displayed exceptional command over his own soldiers. Zhao Xin did not say anything at first, but his chief clerks, Du Shu (杜淑) and Zhang Can (張粲) advised him to get rid of Li Xiáng, warning him that Li Xiáng was not related to him and yet had many of their best soldiers under his command. In 301, Li Xiáng visited Zhao Xin and urged him to claim the imperial title, but Zhao Xin angrily rejected and accused him of treason. After discussing with Du Shu and others, Zhao Xin killed Li Xiáng, along with his sons, nephews and kinsmen, totalling more than ten people.

Li Xiáng's brothers, Li Te and Li Liu were still guarding the northern front when he died. Soon after, Du Shu and Zhang Can, were also murdered by their peer, Xu Yan (許弇) over a dispute about his office, and Xu Yan was also killed in turn. All three men were Zhao Xin's closest advisors, and with their deaths, his power was greatly weakened. Zhao Xin sent envoys to console and explain his actions to Li Te and Li Liu, even trying to appoint them as generals, but the brothers were furious and led their troops towards Chengdu by passing through Mianzhu.

Zhao Xin sent his generals, Fei Yuan (費遠), Li Bi (李苾) and Chang Jun (常俊) to defend Shiting in Mianzhu. However, they were badly routed when Li Te launched a night raid on their camps, and Li Te continued his march onto Chengdu. Many of the city's commanders and officials fled in fear, leaving Zhao Xin alone with his wife and children. Zhao Xin and his family fled on a small boat, but at Guangdu (廣都; in modern Shuangliu District, Sichuan), they were all killed by a subordinate, Zhu Zhu (朱竺). Li Te soon entered Chengdu, sacking the city before sending a list of crimes that Zhao Xin had committed to the Jin capital in Luoyang.
