= Sima Rong =

Western Jin Prince of Liang (died 302)

Sima Rong 司馬肜

Prince of Liang (梁王)
- Reign: 9 February 266 – 18 June 302
- Born: Between 232 and 249
- Died: June 18, 302; Luoyang, Henan
Names
- Family name: Sima (司馬); Given name: Rong (肜); Courtesy name: Zihui (子徽)
Posthumous name
- Xiao (孝)
- House: House of Sima
- Father: Sima Yi
- Mother: Lady Zhang

Sima Rong (simplified Chinese: 司马肜; traditional Chinese: 司馬肜; died 18 June 302), courtesy name Zihui (子徽), posthumously known as Prince Xiao of Liang (梁孝王), was the son of Sima Yi and his concubine Lady Zhang, and a younger half-brother of Sima Shi and Sima Zhao. Sima Yi, Sima Shi and Sima Zhao eventually became regents of the Cao Wei state during the Three Kingdoms era. Besides his heritage, Sima Rong was known for his involvement in the death of Jin official Zhou Chu, his association with his half-brother Sima Lun, and his relative mediocrity in the various positions he held in the Western Jin government during the reigns of his nephew, Emperor Wu of Jin, and his grandnephew Emperor Hui.

== Life under Cao Wei ==
Sima Rong was born in the 230s or 240s, as the son of Sima Yi and his concubine Lady Zhang. Sima Rong held a number of minor titles during the Cao Wei regencies of his father and half-brothers Sima Shi and Sima Zhao. Around February or March 250, he was enfeoffed as Marquis of Pingle Village, along with his half-brother Sima Lun who was enfeoffed as Marquis of Anle Village. When Sima Zhao established the Five Feudal Ranks of Zhou in 264, his title was changed to Viscount of Kaiping. Also, in that year, he married Wang Can, a daughter of Wang Ji.

== Life during the Jin era ==
In February 266, Sima Zhao's son Sima Yan accepted Cao Huan's abdication and founded the Jin dynasty. Sima Rong was then made Prince of Liang on 9 February, with a fiefdom of 5358 households.

In 284, his wife Wang Can died.

=== During the reign of Emperor Hui ===
After the ascension of Emperor Hui in May 290, on 25 May 291, Sima Rong was named the Grand General of the Western Expedition.

At the beginning of Emperor Hui's reign, Sima Lun was given military command over Qinzhou and Yongzhou. During his tenure, Lun's administration caused a series of tribal revolt which peaked in 296. Both Lun and Sun Xiu placed the blame on the Inspector of Yongzhou, Xie Xi (解系), and the two sides sent petitions to the court accusing one another. Lun was eventually recalled to Luoyang, and was replaced by Sima Rong. Xie also called for Sun Xiu's execution, believing that it would appeal to the tribes' demands. The minister, Zhang Hua considered it and told Sima Rong to prepare Sun's execution. However, an acquaintance of Sun Xiu, Xin Ran managed to convince Sima Rong not to carry out Zhang's orders.

In 296, when Sima Rong was re-appointed the Grand General of the Western Expedition and made Chief Controller of Yong and Liang provinces to quell Qi Wannian's rebellion, Zhou Chu was named the vanguard general. As Palace Aide to the Censor-in-Chief (御史中丞), Zhou had no fear in indicting and exposing the wrongdoings of other ministers. He thus offended many, including Sima Rong. His fellow general Sun Xiu (孫秀) warned him and suggested him to bid his aging mother a final farewell. Zhou Chu replied, "One cannot fulfill both filial piety and loyalty at the same time. Since I have already chosen to serve my country... I will die for it."

Zhou Chu was ordered to take 5,000 soldiers to attack the 70,000-strong enemy. After the attacks began, Sima Rong also ordered his supply to be cut off completely. Zhou's troops ran out of arrows and the generals assigned to reinforce him did not help. When asked to flee, Zhou Chu replied, "I am a minister of a nation. Isn't it proper to die for one's country?" He fought to his death.

On 7 May 300, Sima Rong took part in the coup to depose Jia Nanfeng as empress. Jia's associates, including Pei Wei, Zhang Hua and Jia Mi were executed. On 11 May, Sima Rong was made taizi (太宰; "Grand Chancellor"). Later, in c.October, Sima Rong was named Chancellor (the former post of situ [Minister over the Masses], which was renamed by Lun's administration), but he did not accept the post.

On 16 August 301, after the fall of Sima Lun, Sima Rong was again granted the positions of taizai and Minister over the Masses.

== Death ==
Sima Rong died in June 302 with no surviving sons. He was buried with rites similar to his half-brother Sima Liang's funeral. During discussions on Rong's posthumous name, an official named Cai Ke (蔡克; father of Cai Mo) opined that since Rong attained fame without hard work, his posthumous name should be "Ling". After protests from Rong's associates and subordinates, his posthumous name eventually became "Xiao". He was replaced as Minister over the Masses by Wang Rong.
