= Hanzhong Basin =

Basin of China

- Location within Southwest China Location within China

Geography
- Location: Hanzhong, Shaanxi
- Country: China
- Coordinates: 33°09′N 107°10′E
- Interactive map of Hanzhong Basin

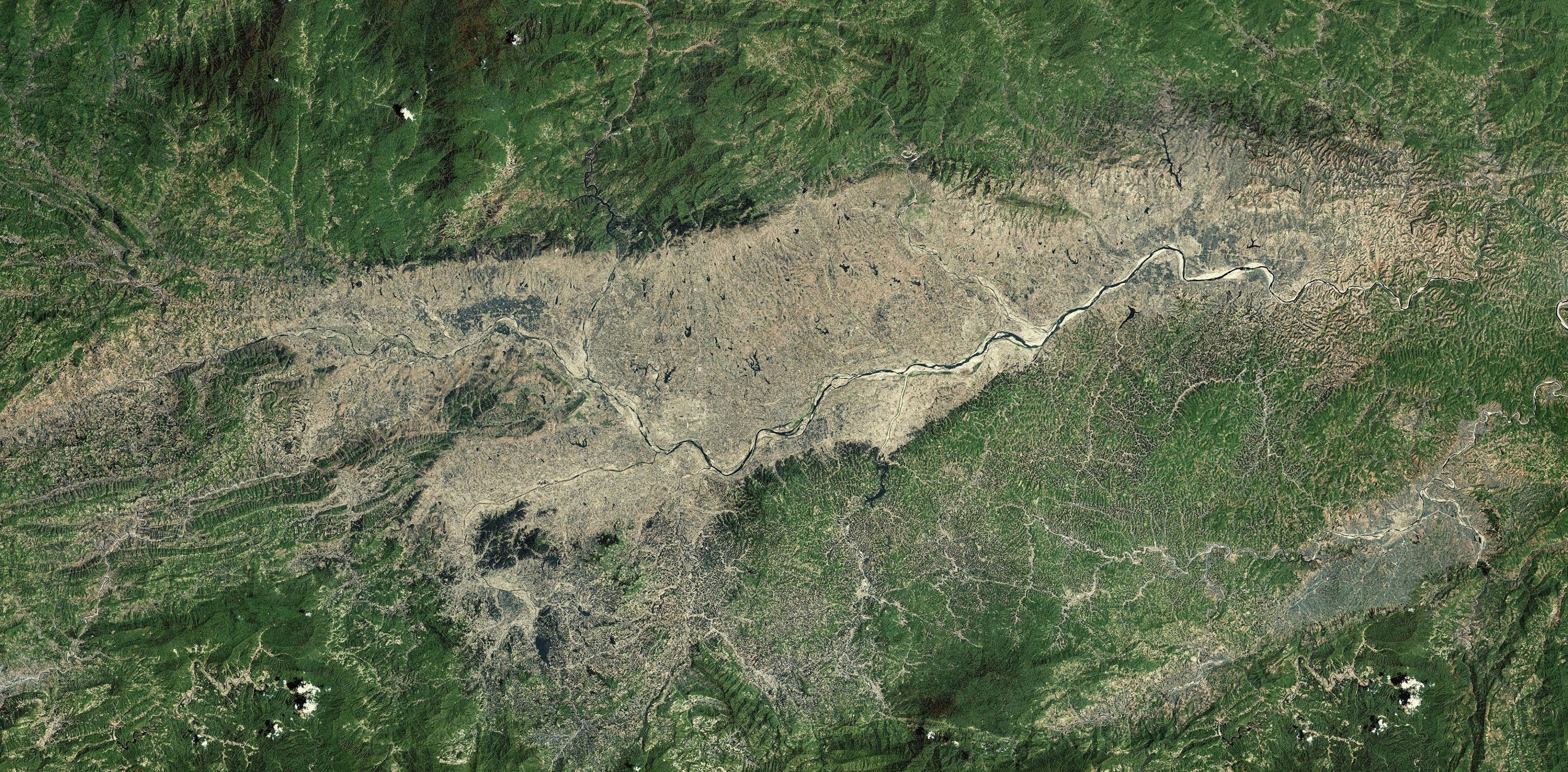

Hanzhong Basin or Hanzhong Pendi (simplified Chinese: 汉中盆地; traditional Chinese: 漢中盆地; pinyin: Hànzhōng Péndì), reputed to be "a land of fish and rice", is a geographic region located in the southern Shaanxi.

Hanzhong Basin is a large-scale Cenozoic faulted basin, and an important agricultural area of southern Shaanxi province.

== Landforms ==
Hanzhong Basin, located in the southwestern Shaanxi, is the largest faulted basin in the upper reaches of the Han River, with the Qinling Mountains to the north and the Daba Mountains to the south. The basin is about 116 km long from east to west and 5~25 km wide from north to south, with a total area of about 2700 km².

== Irrigation ==
The basin has a long history of irrigation, dating back to the first century AD.

== Human activities ==
The era of ancient human activities in the Hanzhong Basin began as late as 600,000 years ago.
