= Langzhong Gucheng Airport =

Langzhong Gucheng Airport 阆中古城机场
- IATA: LZG; ICAO: ZULA

Summary
- Airport type: Public
- Serves: Langzhong, Sichuan, China
- Location: Shilong Town
- Coordinates: 31.50366°N 106.03535°E

Map
- Location of airport in Sichuan

Runways
Direction	Length		Surface
Direction	m	ft	Surface
03/21	3,600	11,811

Langzhong Gucheng Airport
- Simplified Chinese: 阆中古城机场
- Traditional Chinese: 閬中古城機場
Transcriptions
Standard Mandarin
- Hanyu Pinyin: Lángzhōng Gǔchéng Jīchǎng

Langzhong Gucheng Airport (IATA: LZG, ICAO: ZULA) is an airport serving the city of Langzhong in Southwest China's Sichuan Province. It is located in the town of Shilong (石龙) in Langzhong. This airport named after Lanzhong's historic city centre.

Construction for the airport first began in 1994, after receiving approval from the national government of China in August 1992. However, work was later stopped for shortage of funds. Meanwhile, nearby Guangyuan Panlong Airport and Nanchong Gaoping Airport, which were started later, were completed and opened to the public.

In December 2018, construction for Langzhong Airport resumed after a hiatus of more than 20 years, as the growing popularity of Langzhong as a tourist destination provides new justification for building the airport. The construction budget is 960 million yuan, and the airport opened on December 17, 2023.

Langzhong Airport has a 3,600-metre (11,800 ft) runway (class 4C) and a 7,000-square-metre (75,000 sq ft) terminal building.

== Airlines and destinations ==
Airlines	Destinations
China Southern Airlines	Guangzhou
Hainan Airlines	Beijing–Capital
Suparna Airlines	Shanghai–Pudong, Shenzhen

== See also ==
- List of airports in China
- List of the busiest airports in China
