= Bandun Man =

Ancient ethnic group from the Jialing River valley region, present-day China

Bandun Man (simplified Chinese: 板楯蛮; traditional Chinese: 板楯蠻; pinyin: bǎndùn mán) were an ancient people living along the Jialing River valley, in the area of modern Langzhong in Nanchong, Sichuan, China. Their name, literally meaning 'Board Shield Barbarians', is derived from their fighting style of charging with shields to break the enemy line. The Bandun Man were also called Bohu Yi (白虎夷), meaning 'White Tiger Yi', and also as the Zong (賨), named after their status as tax tributaries to the Han dynasty.

In the second century CE, many of the Bandun tribes converted to the Way of the Five Pecks of Rice and migrated north to join the sect leader, Zhang Lu at Hanzhong. After Zhang Lu surrendered to the warlord, Cao Cao in 216, they were resettled to Lüeyang Commandery (略陽郡; in modern Tianshui, Gansu), where they intermingled with the local Di tribes. These Bandun people became known as the Ba Di (巴氐), with "Ba" referring to their ancestral homeland in Sichuan. The Ba Di were later displaced and returned to Sichuan, where in 304, their leader, Li Xiong declared independence from the Western Jin dynasty and established the Cheng-Han dynasty, the first state of the Sixteen Kingdoms.

== See also ==
- Nanman
