= Qi Wannian =

Chinese tribal chief

- Traditional Chinese: 齊萬年
- Simplified Chinese: 齐万年
Transcriptions
Standard Mandarin
- Hanyu Pinyin: Qí wànnián
- Wade–Giles: ch'i wan-nien

Qi Wannian (died February or March 299), or Qiwannian, was an ethnic Di chieftain and rebel leader during the Western Jin dynasty of China. In 296, he became the leader of a tribal uprising against Jin in Qin and Yong provinces that lasted until early 299. The rebellion raised concerns among some ministers regarding the tension between the Han and tribal people while also triggering mass displacement and migration of refugees into Hanzhong and Sichuan.

== Prelude ==
During the Han dynasty and Cao Wei period, the Guanzhong region was home to many ethnic groups such as the Qiang and Di. Due to oppression by local Han administrators, these groups, most notably the Qiang, would frequently rebel against the ruling dynasties and such events only intensified during the Western Jin period. In 270, during the reign of Emperor Wu of Jin, the Xianbei chieftain, Tufa Shujineng, led a rebellion in Liang, Qin and Yong provinces involving the Qiang, Di and other tribal people against Jin. The rebels briefly captured Liang province, but were eventually defeated in early 280.

In 294, during the reign of Emperor Hui of Jin, a Xiongnu leader in Bing province, Hao San (郝散), rebelled against Jin but was quickly defeated. His brother, Hao Duyuan (郝度元), survived him and seemingly moved westward to the Guanzhong region. At that time, the commander in charge of defending the region was the Prince of Zhao, Sima Lun. The prince was arbitrary in his administration, rewarding and punishing as he pleased, which angered many of the local tribal people. In June or July 296, Hao Duyuan allied himself with the Qiang people of Mount Malan (馬蘭山) in Beidi Commandery (北地, roughly modern Tongchuan, Shaanxi) and the Lushuihu to rebel against Jin. They killed the Administrator of Beidi, Zhang Sun (張損), and routed the Administrator of Pingyi, Ouyang Jian. Sima Lun was recalled to Luoyang for causing the revolt and replaced by his half-brother the Prince of Liang, Sima Rong (司馬肜).

== Qi Wannian's Rebellion ==
Qi Wannian's Rebellion
Date	c.September or October 296 – c.February or March 299
Location	Shaanxi and Gansu, China
Result	Western Jin victory; exodus of refugees into Hanzhong and Sichuan

Belligerents
Western Jin	Qi Wannian

Commanders and leaders
Sima Rong; Xiahou Jun; Zhou Chu †; Meng Guan	Qi Wannian †

Strength
5,000 (Zhou Chu)	70,000+ Di, Qiang, Lushuihu and other tribal rebels

=== Ascension of Qi Wannian ===
In September or October 296, the revolt escalated after Hao Duyuan defeated the Inspector of Yong province, Xie Xi (解系). His victory inspired many of the Qiang and Di tribe in Qin and Yong provinces to take up arms. They elected a Di chieftain, Qi Wannian as their Emperor before laying siege on Jingyang. The court responded by appointing Xiahou Jun (夏侯駿; son of Xiahou Wei) as General Who Maintains the West with the generals, Zhou Chu and Lu Bo (盧播) as his subordinates to assist Sima Rong in quelling the rebellion.

Around the same time, Guanzhong suffered from a series of severe famines and plagues. The ongoing rebellion and the occupation of local commanderies by the army worsened the famine, and food became so scarce that the price for ten hu (斛; a large unit of measurement) of rice rose to ten thousand in cash. The six commanderies of Tianshui, Lueyang, Fufeng, Shiping (始平郡; around present-day Xianyang, Shaanxi), Wudu (武都郡; around present-day Longnan, Gansu) and Yinping (陰平郡; around present-day Wen County, Gansu) were all greatly affected. Tens of thousands of Han Chinese and tribal peoples from these areas became refugees and migrated southward into Hanzhong and Sichuan in search of food.

=== Battle of Liumo ===
There was noted animosity between Sima Rong and Zhou Chu. The minister, Chen Zhun (陳準), had pointed out this issue and warned that Sima Rong may send Zhou Chu out to his death. He suggested for Zhou Chu to be aided by another general, Meng Guan, with 10,000 elite soldiers, but the court did not listen. Qi Wannian himself was wary of Zhou Chu, as the latter had experience dealing with the Qiang and Di tribes during his tenure as Administrator of Xinping (新平郡; around present-day Bin County, Shaanxi), but believed he could easily be defeated if he was subordinated.

In February 297, Qi Wannian camped his forces at Mount Liang (梁山, in modern-day Qian County, Shaanxi) and amassed a huge force of 70,000 men. Zhou Chu was only given 5,000 men to attack the rebels, and despite raising objections, Sima Rong and Xiahou Jun ignored his concerns and forced him to go. His soldiers were also not given time to eat before they had to join Xie Xi and Lu Bo's forces in attacking the rebels at Liumo (六陌, in modern-day Qian County, Shaanxi). Zhou Chu and his soldiers fought for an entire day and killed many of the rebels, but they eventually ran out of arrows and exhausted their bows. As reinforcements failed to arrive, Zhou Chu refused to retreat and died in a famous last stand.

=== End of the rebellion ===
Qi Wannian's rebellion raged on into 298. Frustrated by the lack of progress, Zhang Hua and Chen Zhun charged both Sima Lun and Sima Rong for neglecting military affairs in Guanzhong. The two ministers then recommended for Meng Guan to campaign against the rebels and put an end to the rebellion. Meng Guan proved himself more competent than the princes, as he led his army to defeat the rebels in numerous battles. In February or March 299, he fought Qi Wannian's forces at Zhongting (中亭, west of present-day Wugong, Shaanxi), where he defeated the Di army and killed Qi Wannian, thus ending the four-year-long rebellion.

== Aftermath ==
The rebellion raised some concerns regarding the tribal peoples living within the Chinese interior. One minister, Jiang Tong, because of the rebellion, wrote an essay titled "Discussion on Relocating the Rong Tribes (徙戎論)" which he submitted to the Jin court, warning them about the threat possessed by the tribes to the dynasty and advocating for their repatriation. However, the Jin court rejected his proposal.

Qi Wannian's rebellion sparked a chain reaction of refugee rebellions in Sichuan and central China; The refugees from Guanzhong founded the Di-led polity of Chouchi in the Hanzhong Basin in 296, while those who fled further south later joined the Ba Di leader, Li Te in his rebellion against Jin in 301. His son, Li Xiong ousted the Jin from Chengdu and founded the Cheng-Han dynasty in 304. Due to the rebellion, the people of Sichuan themselves became displaced and fled to Jing province in the east. These refugees joined Zhang Chang, an official of Nanman origins, when he rebelled in 303, but his rebellion was put down by late 304. Regardless, refugees continued to pour into Jing from Sichuan as war between the Jin and Cheng raged on. In 311, the refugees in Jing acclaimed Du Tao, a Han Chinese official, as their leader and rebelled due to the oppression they faced by the local populace, and their rebellion lasted until 315, when they were finally defeated by Jin forces.
