= Mianzhu =

Mianzhu 绵竹市
- County-level city
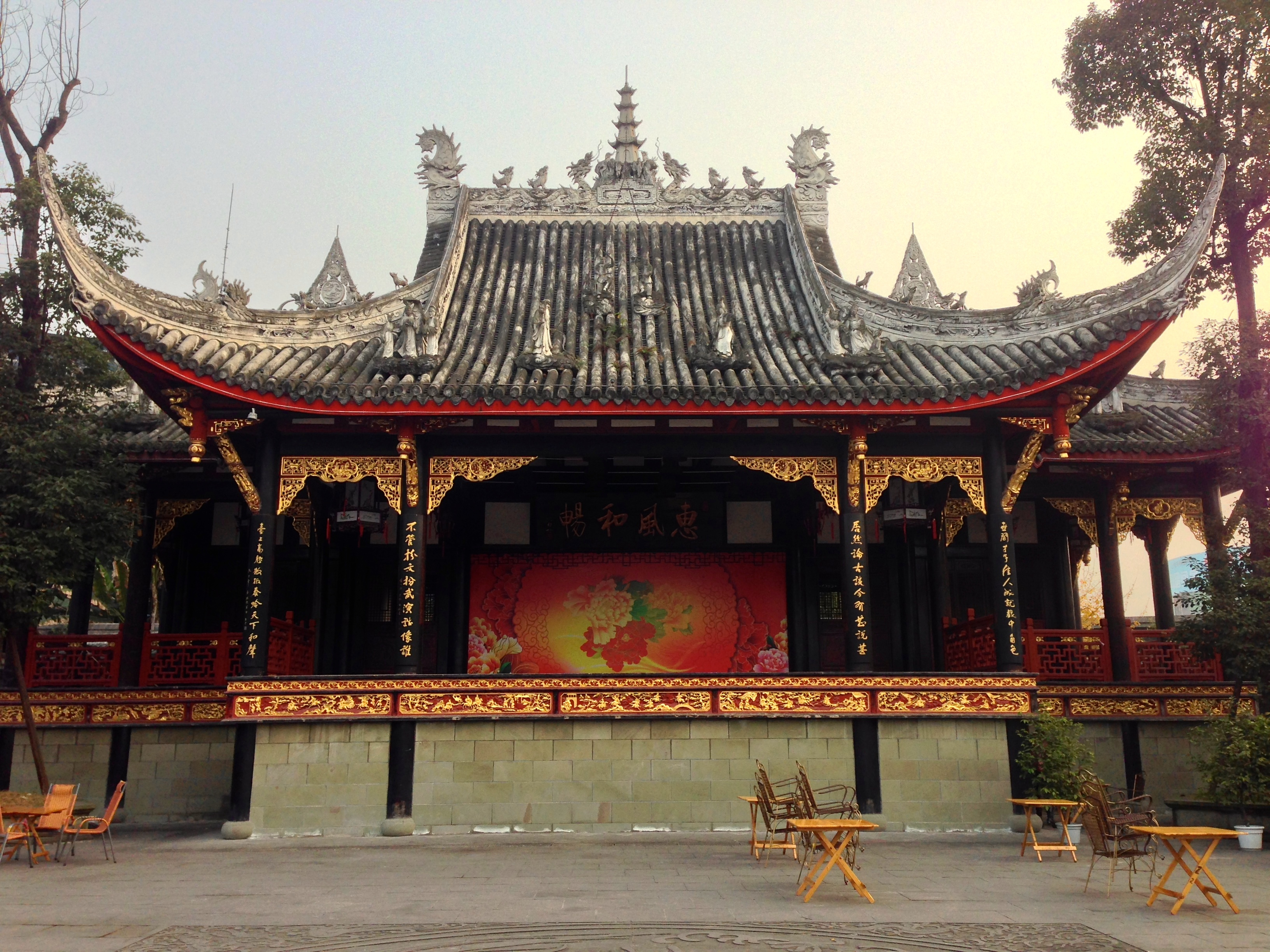

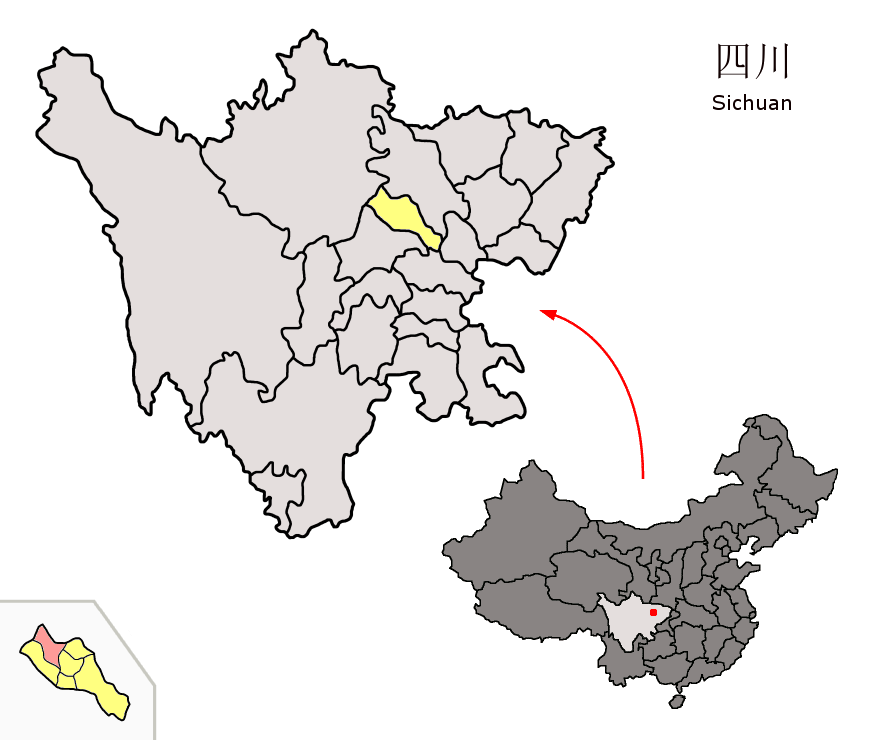
- Location of Mianzhu City (red) within Deyang City (yellow) and Sichuan province

- Location in Sichuan
- Coordinates: 31°20′0″N 104°12′0″E
- Country: China
- Province: Sichuan
- Prefecture-level city: Deyang
- Municipal seat: Jiannan Subdistrict

Area
  - Total: 1,245 km^{2} (481 sq mi)

Population (2020 census)
  - Total: 439,958
  - Density: 353.4/km^{2} (915.2/sq mi)
- Time zone: UTC+8 (China Standard)
- Postal code: 618200
- Area code: 0838
- Website: http://www.mianzhu.gov.cn/

Mianzhu (Chinese: 绵竹; pinyin: Miánzhú; Wade–Giles: Mienchu) is a county-level city of Deyang, Sichuan province in Southwest China. It has an area of 1,245 square kilometers (481 sq mi) and a population of 439,958 in 2020 census.

== Administrative divisions ==
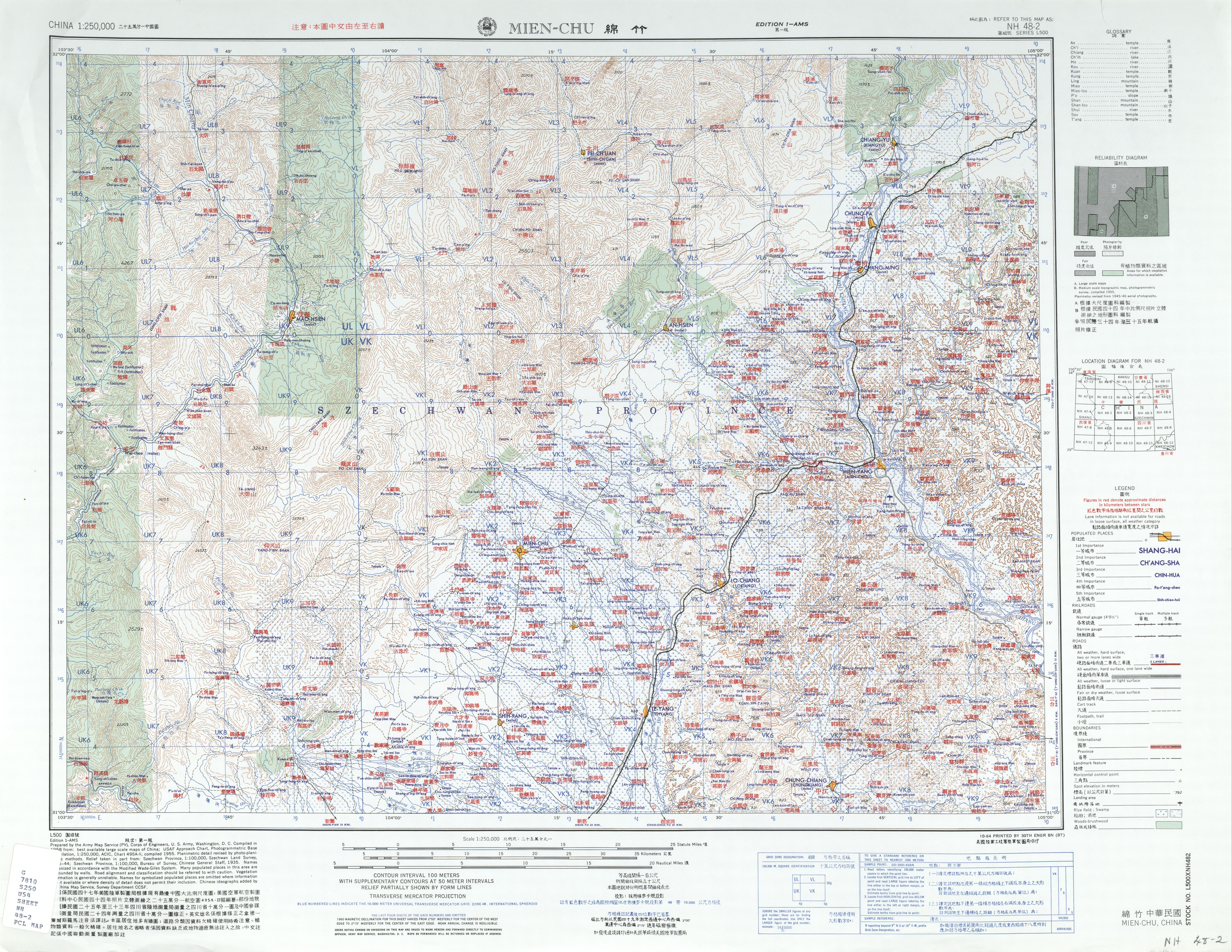
Map including Mianzhu (labeled as MIEN-CHU (walled) 綿竹) (AMS, 1958)

Mianzhu has 2 subdistricts and 10 towns under its jurisdiction:

subdistricts

- Jiannan (剑南街道)
- Ziyan (紫岩街道)

towns

- Jiulong (九龙镇)
- Hanwang (汉旺镇)
- Lutang (麓棠镇)
- Guangji (广济镇)
- Yuquan (玉泉镇)
- Xinshi (新市镇)
- Xiaode (孝德镇)
- Fuxin (富新镇)
- Shidi (什地镇)
- Qingping (清平镇)

== Climate ==
Climate data for Mianzhu, elevation 589 m (1,932 ft), (1991–2020 normals, extremes 1981–present)
Month	Jan	Feb	Mar	Apr	May	Jun	Jul	Aug	Sep	Oct	Nov	Dec	Year
Record high °C (°F)	18.4 (65.1)	20.8 (69.4)	29.6 (85.3)	31.7 (89.1)	35.2 (95.4)	34.3 (93.7)	37.7 (99.9)	39.7 (103.5)	34.9 (94.8)	28.5 (83.3)	25.7 (78.3)	19.8 (67.6)	39.7 (103.5)
Mean daily maximum °C (°F)	8.7 (47.7)	11.5 (52.7)	16.1 (61.0)	21.9 (71.4)	25.9 (78.6)	27.9 (82.2)	29.7 (85.5)	29.4 (84.9)	25.1 (77.2)	20.2 (68.4)	15.4 (59.7)	10.0 (50.0)	20.2 (68.3)
Daily mean °C (°F)	5.5 (41.9)	8.0 (46.4)	12.0 (53.6)	17.2 (63.0)	21.1 (70.0)	23.8 (74.8)	25.6 (78.1)	25.2 (77.4)	21.5 (70.7)	16.9 (62.4)	12.2 (54.0)	6.9 (44.4)	16.3 (61.4)
Mean daily minimum °C (°F)	2.9 (37.2)	5.2 (41.4)	8.8 (47.8)	13.5 (56.3)	17.4 (63.3)	20.5 (68.9)	22.3 (72.1)	21.8 (71.2)	18.9 (66.0)	14.6 (58.3)	9.7 (49.5)	4.4 (39.9)	13.3 (56.0)
Record low °C (°F)	−4.7 (23.5)	−4.0 (24.8)	−2.9 (26.8)	3.9 (39.0)	7.5 (45.5)	14.3 (57.7)	16.0 (60.8)	16.2 (61.2)	12.4 (54.3)	3.3 (37.9)	1.4 (34.5)	−6.2 (20.8)	−6.2 (20.8)
Average precipitation mm (inches)	9.1 (0.36)	12.2 (0.48)	24.3 (0.96)	47.1 (1.85)	79.8 (3.14)	101.2 (3.98)	231.5 (9.11)	257.5 (10.14)	145.7 (5.74)	54.0 (2.13)	18.4 (0.72)	6.6 (0.26)	987.4 (38.87)
Average precipitation days (≥ 0.1 mm)	8.0	8.5	12.3	13.6	14.7	14.8	16.4	16.1	17.1	16.7	8.7	6.2	153.1
Average snowy days	2.2	0.7	0	0	0	0	0	0	0	0	0.1	0.5	3.5
Average relative humidity (%)	77	75	73	71	70	76	79	80	81	81	78	78	77
Mean monthly sunshine hours	47.7	45.0	68.3	93.7	102.3	92.0	107.6	116.4	55.0	46.0	49.3	49.3	872.6
Percentage possible sunshine	15	14	18	24	24	22	25	29	15	13	16	16	19
Source: China Meteorological Administrationall-time extreme temperatureall-time January highall-time July High

== Economic ==
Mianzhu is a symbolic place presenting the south-west cities which produce special products, such as the peal from Jiulong Mountain, a branch of Longmen Mountain. One of the most well-known wines around the country, even the world, is Jian Nan Chun, a kind of traditional Chinese spirit with a history of 500 years. The quote of this company is "what you drink today is what was the Tang Dynasty Palace spirit". The value of JNC's products was at least above three million RMB each year. After 2008, in which year the Wenchuan earthquake happened, the amount have been decreasing to 80 billion since numerous fundamental spirit used to season the taste was lost. Except this famous spirit factory, a dozen of relative smaller companies still work well, Jin Qi FU included.

== Culture ==
Mianzhu New Year Painting is one of the four greatest New Year Paintings in China. Putting New Year Paintings on the front doors of a house is one of many traditional ways to celebrate Chinese Spring Festival in many parts of China. In one such painting, the artists use water colors to draw figures like Fu Wa, wishing the little boy could bring fortune and good luck to the entire family in the coming year. Recently, some New Year Painting workshops in Mianzhu are opened to the visitors and general public so that they could have a closer look at the entire process of how artists are actually making the New Year Painting.

== 2008 Sichuan earthquake ==
The city was heavily damaged during the 2008 Sichuan earthquake. Damage included Fuxin Number Two Primary School collapsed.

== Lingguan Tower blaze ==
Lingguan Tower complex of Nine Dragons Monastery in Jiulong town, the tallest pre-modern then standing wooden pagoda structure, was a 16-story gold covered pagoda from the Ming Dynasty that burned down on December 11, 2017. It was being renovated after the 2008 earthquake damaged it.

== Sports ==
The Mianzhu Sports Centre Stadium is located in Mianzhu. It has a capacity of 10,000, and it is used mostly for association football.
