= Langzhong =

Langzhong 阆中市
- County-level City
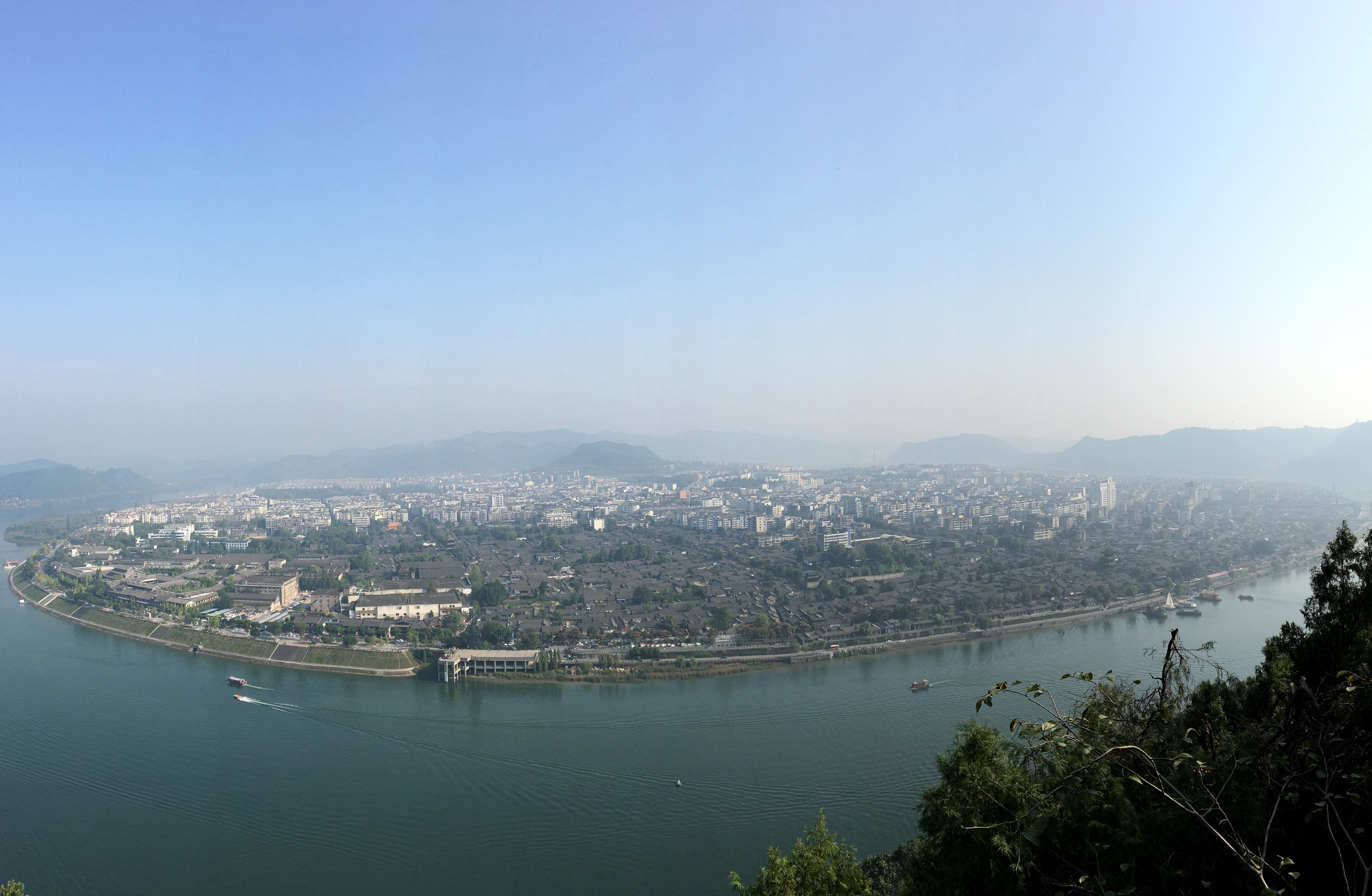
- Langzhong Ancient Town

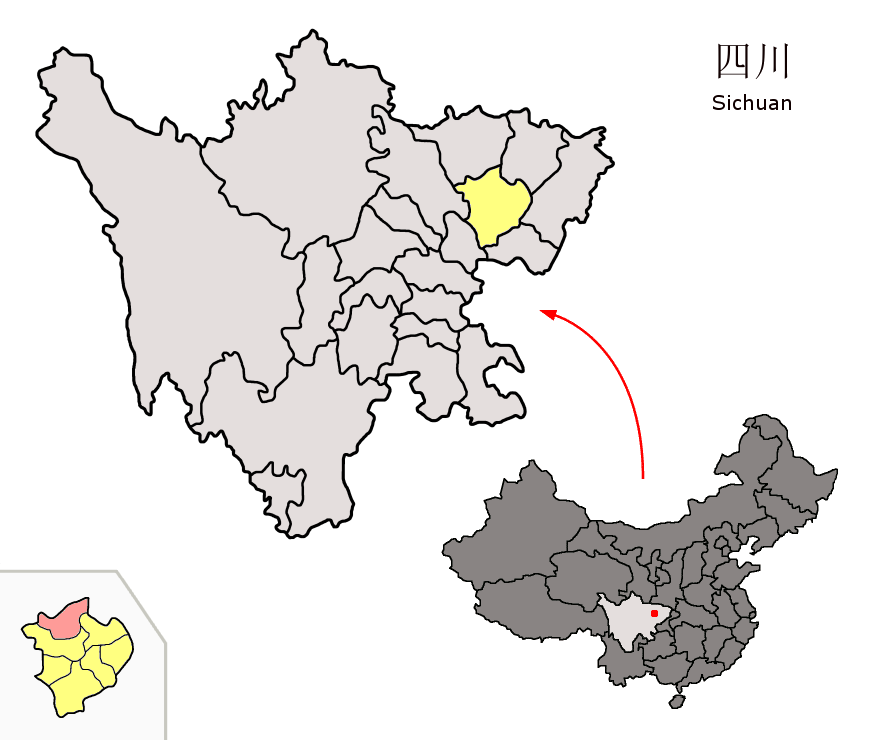
- Location of Langzhong City (red) in Nanchong City (yellow) and Sichuan

- Location of the city centre in Sichuan
- Coordinates (Langzhong government): 31°33′29″N 106°00′18″E
- Country: China
- Province: Sichuan
- Prefecture-level city: Nanchong
- Established: 314 B.C.
- Municipal seat: Qili Subdistrict

Area
  - County-level City: 1,877 km^{2} (725 sq mi)
- Highest elevation: 888 m (2,913 ft)
- Lowest elevation: 328 m (1,076 ft)

Population
  - County-level City: 622,667
  - Density: 331.7/km^{2} (859.2/sq mi)
  - Urban: 303,044
- Time zone: UTC+8 (China Standard Time)
- Website: www.langzhong.gov.cn

Langzhong
- Traditional Chinese: 閬中
- Simplified Chinese: 阆中
- Literal meaning: Within the Dry Moat
Transcriptions
Standard Mandarin
- Hanyu Pinyin: Làngzhōng

Former names

Baoning
- Traditional Chinese: 保寧
- Simplified Chinese: 保宁
- Literal meaning: Pacified-Protecting
Transcriptions
Standard Mandarin
- Hanyu Pinyin: Bǎoníng

Langzhong (formerly known as Paoning) is a county-level city in northeastern Sichuan province, China, located on the middle reaches of the Jialing River. It is administered as part of the prefecture-level city of Nanchong. Langzhong has a total population of 622,667, with 303,044 residing in the urban area in 2020.

Langzhong is famous for its historic centre, home to 30,000 of its residents. It is one of the best preserved historic towns of China, dating back to the Tang dynasty. The city was also the seat of the former Anglican Diocese of Szechwan.

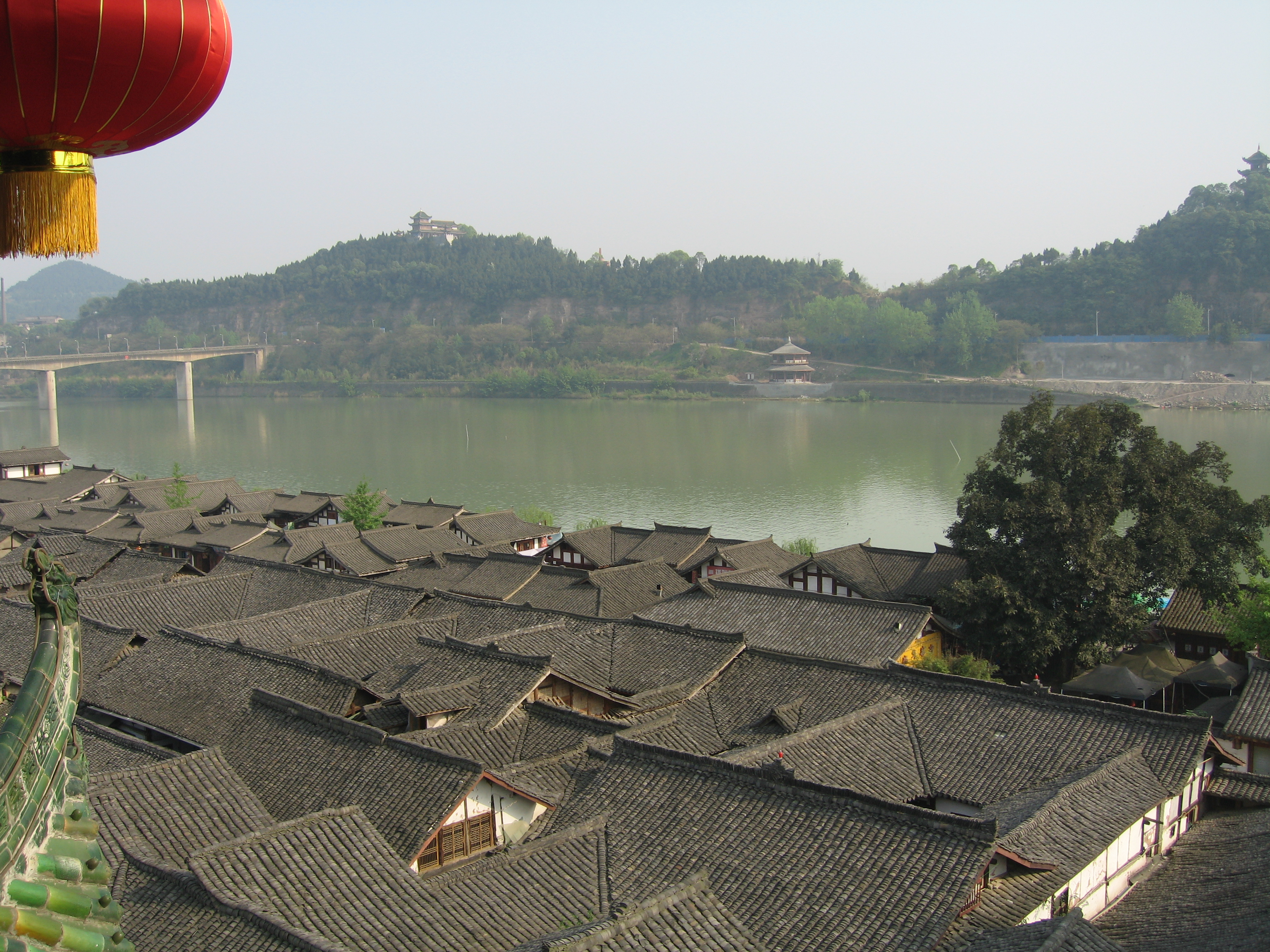
Langzhong Ancient Town

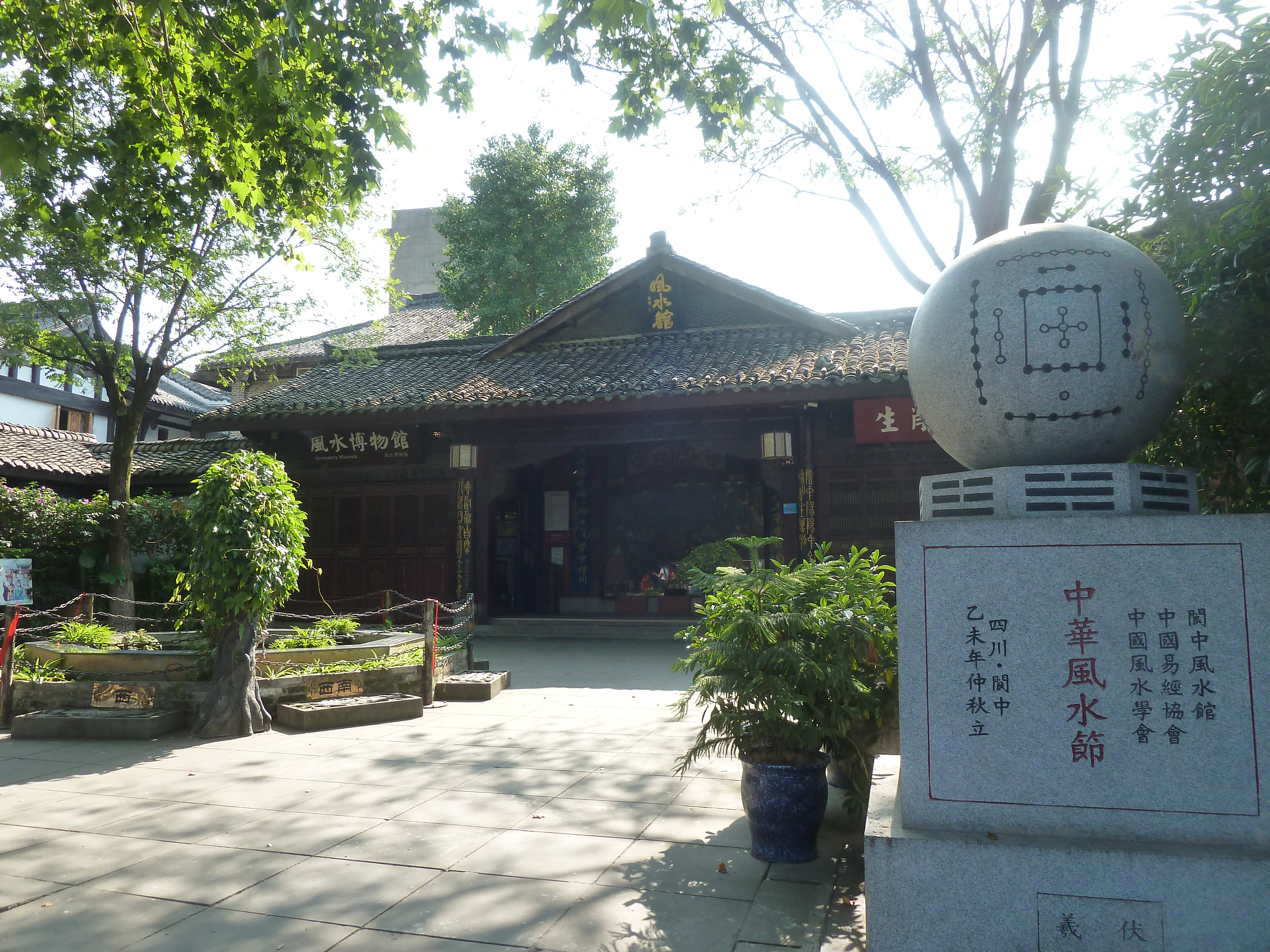
Fengshui Museum

== History ==
The site of present-day Langzhong served for a time as the capital of Ba, a native but sinicized Sichuan state during China's Warring States period. It takes its present name from its role as the seat of Langzhong County, established by Qin two years after its 316 BC conquest of Shu and Ba. Under the Han and Tang, it was an important center for astronomical research. Under the Yuan, Ming, and Qing, it was known as Baoning. (Note: Also romanized as Paou-ning Foo.) Over the late imperial period, it served as Sichuan's provincial capital for a total of ten years. It was well known for its salt wells. It has also long been an important military town of Sichuan.

The old town of Langzhong is built according to Feng shui principles. The dedicated military, trade and residential quarters of the town are located in a location corresponding to a particular element in Feng shui. The town itself is position centrally with respect to 4 mountains around it.

Since 1985, the PRC government has awarded Langzhong with various accolades on three separate occasions. In 1986 the State Council named it a famous and historical town. In 1991, it was finally upgraded to county-level city status.

== Geography ==
Langzhong is located in the northeast of the province and the northern part of the Sichuan Basin on the middle reaches of the Jialing River. Within the city's administrative area, elevations generally increase from southwest to northeast and range from 328 metres (1,076 ft) to 888 metres (2,913 ft), while rivers flow for 59.4 kilometres (36.9 mi). The area is dominated by low-lying mountains and hills.

== Cultural traditions ==
The Zhang Fei worship tradition（张飞祭祀传统）: Local Spring Festival temple fairs often center around the Zhang Fei Temple, continuing the rituals of the Ming and Qing dynasties.

Spring Festival Lantern Festival（春节灯会）: Red lanterns are hung in the ancient city, and dragon and lion dances and stilt walking are performed in northern Sichuan.

Northern Sichuan Lantern Opera（川北灯戏）: The performance style incorporates gongs and drums, rhythmic percussion, and emphasizes a strong sense of rhythm in the "lantern dance".

Langzhong shadow puppetry（阆中皮影戏）: Langzhong shadow puppetry is known for its bold lines, vibrant colors, and exaggerated figures.

Langzhong silk（阆中丝绸）： weaving is delicate and soft, with exquisite processes, and is one of the representatives of traditional handicrafts in northern Sichuan.

== Cuisine ==
Zhangfei Beef (张飞牛肉): Known for its braising, air-drying, and intensely spicy and numbing flavors, it has a deep red color and firm texture. Legend has it that it is associated with Zhang Fei, hence its name.

Langzhong Vinegar (阆中醋): Langzhong's traditional condiments are renowned for their aroma, sourness, and mellowness. Used in local cold noodles, snacks, and everyday dishes, they are an important part of Langzhong's culinary culture. It is also the only medicinal vinegar.

Northern Sichuan Cold Noodles (川北凉粉): Langzhong is one of the birthplaces of Northern Sichuan Cold Noodles. It comes in many varieties, with carefully selected seasonings, and is delicate and refreshing.

Steamed buns with white sugar (白糖蒸馍): Made with high-quality white flour, fermented with yeast instead of alkali, these buns can be made into various shapes.

== Climate ==
As with much of the rest of the province, Langzhong has a monsoon-influenced humid subtropical climate (Köppen Cwa), with dry, temperate winters, and long, hot, humid summers. The monthly daily average temperature ranges from 6.1 °C (43.0 °F) in January to 26.7 °C (80.1 °F) in July. The frost-free period lasts 290 days per year, while annual sunshine amounts to 1,400 hours. Close to two-thirds of the annual rainfall occurs from June to September.

Climate data for Langzhong, elevation 383 m (1,257 ft), (1991–2020 normals, extremes 1971–present)
Month	Jan	Feb	Mar	Apr	May	Jun	Jul	Aug	Sep	Oct	Nov	Dec	Year
Record high °C (°F)	20.8 (69.4)	23.6 (74.5)	32.6 (90.7)	34.9 (94.8)	36.4 (97.5)	36.3 (97.3)	39.6 (103.3)	40.6 (105.1)	37.9 (100.2)	31.3 (88.3)	27.0 (80.6)	18.6 (65.5)	40.6 (105.1)
Mean daily maximum °C (°F)	9.9 (49.8)	12.8 (55.0)	17.8 (64.0)	23.5 (74.3)	27.2 (81.0)	29.6 (85.3)	32.0 (89.6)	32.2 (90.0)	26.7 (80.1)	21.5 (70.7)	16.5 (61.7)	10.9 (51.6)	21.7 (71.1)
Daily mean °C (°F)	6.3 (43.3)	8.8 (47.8)	12.9 (55.2)	18.0 (64.4)	21.9 (71.4)	24.9 (76.8)	27.2 (81.0)	26.9 (80.4)	22.4 (72.3)	17.5 (63.5)	12.6 (54.7)	7.7 (45.9)	17.3 (63.1)
Mean daily minimum °C (°F)	3.8 (38.8)	6.0 (42.8)	9.4 (48.9)	13.9 (57.0)	17.8 (64.0)	21.2 (70.2)	23.6 (74.5)	23.2 (73.8)	19.6 (67.3)	15.1 (59.2)	10.2 (50.4)	5.5 (41.9)	14.1 (57.4)
Record low °C (°F)	−3.1 (26.4)	−1.7 (28.9)	−0.9 (30.4)	4.0 (39.2)	10.0 (50.0)	14.3 (57.7)	17.4 (63.3)	17.0 (62.6)	13.3 (55.9)	2.6 (36.7)	0.7 (33.3)	−4.1 (24.6)	−4.1 (24.6)
Average precipitation mm (inches)	13.9 (0.55)	15.9 (0.63)	30.9 (1.22)	63.6 (2.50)	112.4 (4.43)	161.0 (6.34)	190.0 (7.48)	162.1 (6.38)	147.8 (5.82)	66.9 (2.63)	30.7 (1.21)	11.2 (0.44)	1,006.4 (39.63)
Average precipitation days (≥ 0.1 mm)	7.5	7.0	9.7	10.2	12.3	13.1	13.3	11.0	13.4	13.4	8.2	6.5	125.6
Average snowy days	1.1	0.3	0.1	0	0	0	0	0	0	0	0.1	0.4	2
Average relative humidity (%)	79	75	72	72	71	76	78	76	81	83	81	80	77
Mean monthly sunshine hours	46.4	50.6	88.9	120.0	129.3	117.0	150.2	165.9	88.5	68.3	58.7	43.7	1,127.5
Percentage possible sunshine	14	16	24	31	30	28	35	41	24	19	19	14	25
Source 1: China Meteorological Administration
Source 2: Weather China

== Administrative divisions ==
Langzhong comprises 5 subdistricts, 19 towns, 3 townships and 1 ethnic township:

- Baoning Subdistrict (保宁街道)
- Shaxi Subdistrict (沙溪街道)
- Qili Subdistrict (七里街道)
- Jiangnan Subdistrict (江南街道)
- Hexi Subdistrict (河溪街道)
- Pengcheng Town (彭城镇)
- Baiya Town (柏垭镇)
- Feifeng Town (飞凤镇)
- Siyi Town (思依镇)
- Wencheng Town (文成镇)
- Erlong Town (二龙镇)
- Shitan Town (石滩镇)
- Laoguan Town (老观镇)
- Longquan Town (龙泉镇)
- Qianfo Town (千佛镇)
- Wangya Town (望垭镇)
- Miaogao Town (妙高镇)
- Hongshan Town (洪山镇)
- Shuiguan Town (水观镇)
- Jinya Town (金垭镇)
- Yutai Town (玉台镇)
- Mulan Town (木兰镇)
- Wuma Town (五马镇)
- Tiangong Town (天宫镇)
- Qiaolou Township (桥楼乡)
- Boshu Hui Ethnic Township (博树回族乡)
- Fengzhan Township (峰占乡)
- Hefeng Township (鹤峰乡)

== Transport ==
- China National Highway 212
- Langzhong Gucheng Airport
