= List of Chinese empresses and queens =

Spouses of Chinese rulers

The following is a list of empresses and queens of China, who formed the highest tier of the imperial Chinese harem system. China has periodically been divided into kingdoms as well as united under empires, resulting in consorts titled both queen and empress. The empress title could also be given posthumously, as to the mothers and grandmothers of the founders of dynasties. The posthumous empresses are listed separately by the year they were given the title.

== Empresses and queens ==
=== Xia dynasty (c. 2070 – c. 1600 BC) ===
Name	Spouse
Lady Tushan	Yu the Great
Ji	Xiang
Queen, of a certain tribe	Shao Kang

=== Predynastic Shang (c. 21st century BC – c. 1600 BC) ===
Name	Spouse
Bi Geng (妣庚)	Bao Ding
Bi Geng (妣庚)	Shi Ren
Bi Jia (妣甲)	Shi Gui

=== Shang dynasty (c. 1600 – c. 1046 BC) ===
Name	Parents	Image	Ceased to be queen	Death	Spouse
Bi Jia (妣甲)					Tang
Bi Bing (妣丙)					Tang
Bi Wu (妣戊)					Da Ding
Bi Xin (妣辛)					Tai Jia
Bi Ren (妣壬)					Tai Geng
Bi Ren (妣壬)					Tai Wu
Bi Ji (妣己)					Zhong Ding
Bi Gui (妣癸)					Zhong Ding
Bi Jia (妣甲)					Zu Xin
Bi Ren (妣壬)					Zu Xin
Bi Ji (妣己)					Zu Ding
Bi Geng (妣庚)					Xiao Yi
Fu Hao (婦好)			c. 1200 BC		Wu Ding
Fu Jing (婦妌)					Wu Ding
Fu Jie (妇嬕) or Fu Gui (妣癸)					Wu Ding
Bi Wu (妣戊)					Zu Jia
Bi Xin (妣辛)					Geng Ding
Jiuhou Nü (九侯女)	Jiuhou				Di Xin

=== Predynastic Zhou (c. 1150 – 1046 BC) ===
Name	Image	Birth	Became queen	Ceased to be queen	Death	Spouse
Lady Jiang						Tai
Tai Ren (太任)						Ji
Tai Si (太姒)		c. 12th century BC	1099 BC	1050 BC	c. 11th century BC	Wen

=== Zhou dynasty (1046–256 BC) ===
Name	Image	Parents	Marriage	Became queen	Ceased to be queen	Death	Spouse
Yi Jiang, of the Lü lineage of the Jiang clan of Qi (邑姜)		Jiang Ziya		1046 BC	1043 BC	11th century BC	Wu
Wang Si, of the Si clan (王姒)							Cheng
Wang Jiang, of the Jiang clan (王姜)						10th century BC	Kang
Queen Fang, of the Qi clan (房后)							Zhao
Wang Zu Jiang, of the Jiang clan (王俎姜)							Mu
Wang Gui, of the Gui clan (王媯)							Gong
Wang Bo Jiang, of the Jiang clan (王伯姜)						9th century BC	Yi
Wang Jing (王京)							Xiao
Wang Ji, of the Ji clan of E (王姞)							Yi
Shen Jiang, of the Jiang clan of Shen (申姜)							Li
Queen Jiang, of the Lü lineage of the Jiang clan of Qi (姜后)			826 BC	827 BC	782 BC, Husband's death		Xuan
Queen Shen, of the Jiang clan of Shen (申后)		Marquis of Shen		782 BC	772 BC		You
Bao Si, of the Du lineage of the Qi clan of Bao (褒姒)		Du Bo		779/771 BC	771 BC, Husband's death	771 BC	You
Ji Ji Jiang, of the Jiang clan of Ji (紀季姜)			703 BC				Huan
Queen Chen (陳后)			676 BC				Hui
Chen Gui, of the Gui clan of Chen (陈妫)		Duke Xuan of Chen	676 BC				Hui
Queen Di, of the Kui clan of Di (翟后)				651 BC	619 BC, Deposed		Xiang
Queen Jiang, of the Jiang clan of Qi (姜后)		Duke Hui of Qi	603 BC				King Ding of Zhou
Qi Jiang, of the Jiang clan of Qi (齊姜)		Duke Ling of Qi	558 BC				Ling
Queen Mu (穆后)					527 BC		Jing

==== Spring and Autumn Period (c. 770 – c. 481 BCE) and Warring States Period (c. 475 – 221 BC) ====
===== Chen (c. 1045 BC–479 BC) =====
Name	Parents	Spouse
Daji (大姬)	King Wu of Zhou	Duke Hu
Duchess, of the state of Cai		Duke Huan

===== Chu (c. 1030 BC – 223 BC) =====
Name	Picture	Parents	Death	Spouse
Bi Zhui (妣隹)		Unnamed son of Pan Geng		Jilian
Deng Man (鄧曼/邓曼)				King Wu
Xi Gui (息妫/息媯)				King Wen
Queen, of a certain clan				King Cheng
Zheng Mao, of the Qi clan of Zheng (郑暓/鄭瞀)				King Cheng
Fan Ji (樊姬)			7th century BC	King Zhuang
Qin Ying (秦嬴)				King Gong
Ba Ji (巴姬)				King Gong
Bo Ying (伯嬴)/ Chu Ying (楚赢)		Duke Ai of Qin		King Ping
Zhen Jiang (貞姜)				King Zhao
Wuxu (無卹)				King Sheng
Zheng Xiu (郑袖/鄭袖)				King Huai
Lady Wei (魏美人)				King Huai
Queen Li (李后)				King Kaolie

===== Jin (11th century BC – 369 BC) =====
Name	Picture	Parents	Birth	Marriage	Became Duchess	Ceased to be Duchess	Death	Spouse
Jia Jun (贾君/賈君)								Duke Xian
Qi Jiang (齐姜/齊姜)								Duke Xian
Hu Ji (狐姬)								Duke Xian
Xiao Rong Zi (小戎子)								Duke Xian
Li Ji (骊姬/驪姬)		Unnamed leader of the Li Rong tribe		672 BC		651 BC, Husband's death	651 BC	Duke Xian
Shao Ji (少姬)		Unnamed leader of the Li Rong tribe						Duke Xian
Huai Ying (怀赢/懷嬴)		Duke Mu of Qin	650 BC		637 BC	637 BC	620 BC	Duke Huai
Bi Ji (逼姞)								Duke Wen
Du Qi (杜祁)								Duke Wen
Chen Ying (辰嬴)								Duke Wen
Zhou Nü (周女)								Duke Wen
Mu Ying (穆嬴)								Duke Xiang

===== Lu (c. 1042 BC–249 BC) =====
Name	Picture	Parents	Birth	Marriage	Became Duchess	Ceased to be Duchess	Death	Spouse
Zhong Zi (仲子)		Duke Wu of Song						Duke Hui
Wen Jiang (文姜)		Duke Xi of Qi		709 BC		14 April 694 BC, Husband's death	673 BC	Duke Huan
Ai Jiang (哀姜)								Duke Zhuang
Chu Jiang (出姜)								Duke Wen
Mu Jiang (穆姜)			621 BC			26 September 591 BC, Husband's death	6 May 564 BC	Duke Xuan
Qi Jiang (齊姜/齐姜)								Duke Cheng

===== Qi (1046 BCE – 221 BCE) =====
Name	Parents	Marriage	Became Duchess/Queen	Ceased to be Duchess/Queen	Death	Spouse
Duchess, of the Ma lineage						Duke Tai
Shen Jiang, of the Jiang clan of Shen (申姜)						Duke Tai
Wey Ji, of the Ji clan of Wey (卫姬/衛姬)						Duke Xi
Zhou Wang Ji, of the Ji clan of Zhou (周王姬)	King Huan of Zhou	695 BC				Duke Xiang
Wang Ji, of the Ji clan of Zhou (王姬)						Duke Huan
Xu Ying, of the Ying clan of Xu (徐嬴)						Duke Huan
Cai Ji, of the Ji clan of Cai (蔡姬)						Duke Huan
Zi Shu Ji, of the Ji clan (子叔姬)						Duke Zhao
Xiao Tong Shu Zi, of the Zi clan (萧桐叔子/蕭桐叔子)						Duke Hui
Sheng Meng Zi, of the Zi clan (声孟子/聲孟子)						Duke Qing
Yan Yi Ji, of the Ji clan of Lu (颜懿姬/顏懿姬)						Duke Ling
Yan Ji, of the Ji clan of Yan (燕姬)	Duke Hui of Yan?	536 BC				Duke Jing
Ji Ji, of the Jisun lineage of the Ji clan of Lu (季姬)	Viscount Huan of Ji	490 BC				Duke Dao
Lady, of a certain clan					364 BC	Duke Tai
Queen Wei (威后)						King Wei
Queen Xuan (宣后)					312 BC	King Xuan
Zhongli Chun, of the Zhongli lineage of Qi (钟离春/鍾離春)						King Xuan
Su Liu Nü, of Qi (宿瘤女)						King Min
Queen Dowager Min (湣太后)						King Min
Queen Jun, of the Hou clan of Qi (君王后)	Taishi Jiao			265 BC, Husband's death	249 BC	King Xiang

===== Qin (c. 9th century BC – 207 BC) =====
Name	Parents	Birth	Marriage	Became Marchioness/Duchess/Queen	Ceased to be Marchioness/Duchess/Queen	Death	Spouse
Meng Ji, of the Ji clan (孟姬)							Gongbo
Lu Ji (鲁姬/魯姬)							Duke Xiàn
Lady Mu (穆姬)	Duke Xian of Jin	~672 BC			637 BC		Duke Mu
Qin Xiaozhu Furen (秦小主夫人)					387 BC, Husband's death	385 BC	Duke Hui
Queen Huiwen (惠文后)	King Hui of Wei?		334 BC		311 BC, Husband's death	305 BC	King Huiwen
Queen Daowu/ Queen Wu, of the Wei lineage of the Ji clan of Wei (悼武后/武后)							King Wu
Queen Yeyang (葉陽后)							King Zhaoxiang
Queen Dowager Tang, of the Tang lineage (唐太后)							King Zhaoxiang
Queen Dowager Huayang, of the Xiong lineage of the Mi clan of Chu (花阳太后/華陽太后)	Mi Rong	296 BC		12 November250 BC	14 November 250 BC, Husband's death	230 BC	King Xiaowen
Queen Dowager Zhao (趙太后/赵太后)		c. 280 BC		c. November 250 BCE	6 July 247 BCE, Husband's death	228 BC	King Zhuangxiang

===== Wey (c. 1040 BCE – 209 BCE) =====
Name	Picture	Parents	Birth	Ceased to be Duchess	Death	Spouse
Xuan Jiang			730 BC	700 BC, Husband's death	690 BC	Duke Xuan
Duchess Jiang (姜)						Duke Xiang
Lady Nanzi (南子)		Duke Ping of Song?		492 BC, Husband's death	480 BC	Duke Ling

===== Yan (11th century BC–222 BC) =====
Name	Parents	Spouse
Queen, of the Zhao clan	King Huiwen of Zhao	King Wucheng

===== Zheng (806 BC–375 BC) =====
Name	Spouse
Wu Jiang (武姜)	Duke Wu

=== Western Han dynasty (202 BC – 9 AD) ===
Name*	Image	Parents	Birth	Marriage	Became empress	Ceased to be empress	Death	Spouse
Lü Zhi, Empress Gao, of the Lü clan		Lü Wen, Prince Xuan of Lü; Princess Consort Xuan	241 BC		202 BC	195 BC Husband's death	18 Aug 180 BC	Emperor Gaozu of Han
Zhang Yan, Empress Xiaohui, of the Zhang clan (Note: Lady Zhang's name was not recorded in her biographies in either Shiji or Han Shu. This name first appeared in Shiji Suoyin by Sima Zhen, citing Huangfu Mi.)		Zhang Ao, Prince of Zhao; Princess Yuan of Lu		192 BC	192 BC	188 BC Husband's death	163 BC	Emperor Hui of Han
Empress, of the Lü clan		Lü Lu (呂祿)	c. 205 BC		184 BC	180 BC	c. 180 BC	Emperor Houshao of Han
Dou Yifang, Empress Xiaowen, of the Dou clan		Dou Chong, Marquis Ancheng	205 BC	179 BC	179 BC	157 BC Husband's death	135 BC	Emperor Wen of Han
Empress, of the Bo clan				158 BC	157 BC	151 BC Deposed	147 BC	Emperor Jing of Han
Wang Zhi, Empress Xiaojing, of the Wang clan (Note: Lady Wang's name was not recorded in her biographies in either Shiji or Han Shu. This name first appeared in Shiji Suoyin by Sima Zhen, citing Huangfu Mi.)		Wang Zhong, Zang Er	173 BC		150 BC	126 BC Husband's death	25 June 126 BC	Emperor Jing of Han
Chen Jiao, Empress, of the Chen clan		Chen Wu, Marquess of Tangyi; Liu Piao, Princess Guantao			141 BC	130 BC Deposed	c. 110 BC	Emperor Wu of Han
Wei Zifu, Empress Xiaowusi, of the Wei clan		Madam Wei (衛媼)			128 BC	91 BC		Emperor Wu of Han
Empress Xiaozhao, of the Shangguan clan		Shangguan An, Lady Huo	89 BC(?) (Note: Lady Shangguan's biography in Book of Han indicated that she was 6 (by East Asian reckoning) when she was made empress.)	84 BC	83 BC	74 BC Husband's death	37 BC	Emperor Zhao of Han
Xu Pingjun, Empress Gong'ai, of the Xu clan		Xu Guanghan	c. 90 BC	c. 76 BCE	74 BC	71 BC		Emperor Xuan of Han
Huo Chengjun, Empress, of the Huo clan		Huo Guang; Lady Xian			70 BC	66 BC Deposed	54 BC	Emperor Xuan of Han
Empress Xiaoxuan, of the Wang clan		Wang Fengguang, Marquess of Qiongcheng		64 BC		49 BC Husband's death	16 BC	Emperor Xuan of Han
Wang Zhengjun, Empress Xiaoyuan, of the Wang clan		Wang Jin, Marquess of Yangping; Li Qin	71 BC	c. 50 BC	48 BC	33 BC Husband's death	13 AD	Emperor Yuan of Han
Xu Kua, Empress, of the Xu clan		Xu Jia, the Marquess of Ping'en			31 BC	18 BC Deposed	8 BC	Emperor Cheng of Han
Zhao Feiyan, Empress Xiaocheng, of the Zhao clan			c. 32 BC		16 BC	7 BC Husband's death	1 BC	Emperor Cheng of Han
Empress Xiao'ai, of the Fu clan		Fu Yan, Marquis of Kongxiang			6 BC	1 BC		Emperor Ai of Han
Empress Xiaoping, of the Wang clan		Wang Mang; Lady Wang	8 BC	4 AD		5 AD Husband's death	23 AD	Emperor Ping of Han
Personal name, posthumous name, maiden clan

=== Xin dynasty (9–23) ===
Name	Parents	Marriage	Became empress	Ceased to be empress	Death	Spouse
Empress Wang	Wang Xian, Marquess of Yichin		9	21		Emperor Wang Mang
Empress Shi	Shi Chen (史諶)	23				Emperor Wang Mang

=== Eastern Han dynasty (25–220) ===
Name*	Image	Parents	Birth	Marriage	Became empress	Ceased to be empress	Death	Spouse
Guo Shengtong, Empress, of the Guo clan		Guo Chang, Marquess Si of Yin'an	c. 6	24	10 July 26	1 December 41; Deposed	22 July 52	Emperor Guangwu of Han
Yin Lihua, Empress Guanglie, of the Yin clan		Yin Mu; Deng	5	41		29 March 57; Husband's death	26 February 64	Emperor Guangwu of Han
Empress Mingde, of the Ma clan of Fufeng		General Ma Yuan	Late 30s	49	8 April 60	5 September 75; Husband's death	16 August 79	Emperor Ming of Han
Empress Zhangde, of the Dou clan of Fufeng		Dou Xun; Princess Piyang	c. 63	77	3 April 78	9 April 88; Husband's death	8 October 97	Emperor Zhang of Han
Empress, of the Yin clan		Yin Gang	c. 80	92	31 March 96	24 July 102; Deposed	c. August 102	Emperor He of Han
Deng Sui, Empress Hexi, of the Deng clan		Deng Xun; Lady Yin	81	96	21 November 102	13 February 106; Husband's death	5 April 121	Emperor He of Han
Yan Ji, Empress Ansi, of the Yan clan		Yan Chang		114	1 June 115	30 April 125; Husband's death	28 February 126	Emperor An of Han
Liang Na, Empress Shunlie, of the Liang clan		Liang Shang	116	128	2 March 132	20 September 144; Husband's death	6 April 150	Emperor Shun of Han
Liang Nüying, Empress Yixian, of the Liang clan		Grand Marshal Liang Shang		147	30 September 147	9 August 159		Emperor Huan of Han
Deng Mengnü, Empress, of the Deng clan		Deng Xiang; Xuan			159	27 March 165; Deposed	165	Emperor Huan of Han
Dou Miao, Empress Huansi, of the Dou clan of Fufeng		Dou Wu		c. 165	10 December 165	25 January 168; Husband's death	18 July 172	Emperor Huan of Han
Empress, of the Song clan		Song Feng		170	12 October 171	c. November 178; Deposed	c. November 178	Emperor Ling of Han
Empress Lingsi, of the He clan		He Zhen, Marquis Xuande of Wuyang, Lady of Wuyang			8 January 181	13 May 189; Husband's death	30 September 189	Emperor Ling of Han
Empress, of the Tang clan		Tang Mao			15 May 189	28 September 189, Husband's deposition	after the early 190s	Emperor Shao of Han
Fu Shou, Empress, of the Fu clan		Fu Wan, Marquis of Buqi; Ying		190	20 May 195	8 January 215		Emperor Xian of Han
Cao Jie, Empress Xianmu, of the Cao clan		Cao Cao			6 March 215	11 December 220; Husband's abdication	2 July 260	Emperor Xian of Han
Personal name, posthumous name, maiden clan

=== Three Kingdoms period (220–280) ===
==== Cao Wei (220–266) ====
Name	Parents	Birth	Marriage	Became empress	Ceased to be empress	Death	Spouse
Guo Nüwang	Guo Yong; Lady Yong	8 April 184		31 October 222	29 June 226; Husband's death	14 March 235	Cao Pi
Empress Mao	Mao Jia			26 December 227	22 September 237		Cao Rui
Empress Guo	Guo Man; Lady Du			16 January 239	22 January 239; Husband's death	8 February 264	Cao Rui
Empress Zhen				29 May 243	22 August 251		Cao Fang
Empress Zhang	Zhang Ji			c. March 252	c. April 254; Deposed		Cao Fang
Empress Wang	Wang Kui			c. May 254	17 October 254; Husband's deposition		Cao Fang
Empress Bian	Bian Long		April or May 255		2 June 260; Husband's death		Cao Mao
Empress Bian	Bian Lin		28 November 263		4 February 266; Husband's abdication		Cao Huan

==== Shu Han (221–263) ====
Name	Parents	Marriage	Became empress	Ceased to be empress	Death	Spouse
Empress Wu		214	19 June 221	10 June 223; Husband's death	September or October 245	Liu Bei
Empress Zhang	Zhang Fei	221	June 223; Husband's accession	July or August 237		Liu Shan
Empress Zhang	Zhang Fei		February 238	December 263; Husband's death		Liu Shan

==== Eastern Wu (222–280) ====
Name	Image	Parents	Birth	Marriage	Became empress	Ceased to be empress	Death	Spouse
Empress Pan					June or July 251	February or March 252		Sun Quan
Empress Quan Huijie		Quan Shang	244		16 February 253	9 November 258; Husband's death	c. early 300s	Sun Liang
Empress Zhu		Zhu Ju; Sun Luyu		c. 250	16 September 262	3 September 264; Husband's death	July or August 265	Sun Xiu
Empress Teng Fanglan		Teng Mu			November 264	1 May 280; Husband's deposition		Sun Hao

=== Jin dynasty (266–403, 404–420) ===
Name	Picture	Parents	Birth	Marriage	Became Empress	Ceased to be Empress	Death	Spouse
Empress Yang Yan		Yang Wenzong; Lady Zhao	238	Before 265	20 March 266	25 August 274		Emperor Wu of Jin
Empress Yang Zhi		Yang Jun	259	13 December 276		16 May 290 husband's death	6 March 292	Emperor Wu of Jin
Empress Jia Nanfeng		Jia Chong; Guo Huai	257	2 April 272	16 May 290 husband's accession	7 May 300 deposed	13 May 300	Emperor Hui of Jin
Empress Yang Xianrong		Yang Xuanzhi (Duke of Xingjin)	In or before 290	December 300		3 February 301 husband's deposition	13 May 322	Emperor Hui of Jin
Empress Yang Xianrong		Yang Xuanzhi (Duke of Xingjin)	In or before 290	December 300	1 June 301 husband's restoration	8 January 307 (Note: Yang Xianrong was deposed and restored four times each from 304 to 306. Her tenures as empress were as follows: June 301–February 304; July–August 304; November 304–April 305; November 305; May 306–January 307) husband's death	13 May 322	Emperor Hui of Jin
Empress Liang Lanbi		Liang Fen	Unknown	Before February 305	11 January 307 husband's accession	311 (Note: Her fate after she and her husband were captured by Han-Zhao forces in July 311 is unknown.)	Unknown	Emperor Huai of Jin
Empress Yu Wenjun		Yu Chen; Lady Xun	297	Before May 318	4 January 323 husband's accession	18 October 325 husband's death	March or April 328	Emperor Ming of Jin
Empress Du Lingyang		Du Yi; Lady Pei	321	17 March 336		7 April 341		Emperor Cheng of Jin
Empress Chu Suanzi		Chu Pou; Xie Zhenshi	324	Before 342	10 February 343	17 November 344 husband's death	5 July 384	Emperor Kang of Jin
Empress He Fani		He Zhun; Lady Kong	339	19 September 357		10 July 361 husband's death	13 September 404	Emperor Mu of Jin
Empress Wang Muzhi		Wang Meng; Lady Yuan	Unknown	Before 361	29 October 361	22 February 365		Emperor Ai of Jin
Empress Yu Daolian		Yu Bing	Unknown	Before 361	13 August 365	5 July 366		Emperor Fei of Jin
Empress Wang Fahui		Wang Yun; Lady Liu	c. 360	1 October 375		24 October 380		Emperor Xiaowu of Jin
Empress Wang Shen'ai		Wang Xianzhi; Princess Xin'an	384	396	3 May 397	22 December 403 husband's deposition	3 October 412	Emperor An of Jin
Empress Wang Shen'ai		Wang Xianzhi; Princess Xin'an	384	396	June 404 husband's restoration	3 October 412		Emperor An of Jin
Empress Chu Lingyuan		Chu Shuang	384	Before 419	12 February 419	7 July 420 husband's deposition	7 August 436	Emperor Gong of Jin

=== Huan Chu dynasty (403–404) ===
Name	Parents	Birth	Marriage	Became Empress	Ceased to be Empress	Death	Spouse
Empress Liu	Liu Dan	Unknown	Before 404	Spring 404	19 June 404 husband's deposition	Unknown	Huan Xuan

=== Sixteen Kingdoms period (304 – 439 AD) ===
==== Cheng-Han (304–347) ====
Name	Marriage	Became Empress	Ceased to be Empress	Death	Spouse
Empress Ren	Unknown	February or March 315	August 334 husband's death	Unknown	Emperor Wu of Cheng
Empress Yan	Unknown	334 husband's accession	338? (Note: Her husband was overthrown in 338, but it is unknown if she was still alive by this time.)	Unknown	Li Qi
Empress Yan	Unknown	338 husband's accession	September 343 husband's death	After 343	Emperor Zhaowen of Han
Empress Li	Before 343	343 husband's accession	347 husband's deposition	Unknown	Li Shi

==== Han-Zhao (304–329) ====
Name	Picture	Parents	Birth	Marriage	Became Empress	Ceased to be Empress	Death	Spouse
Empress Huyan		Huyan Yi	Unknown	Before 304	307	Before or in 310		Liu Yuan
Empress Shan		Shan Zheng	Unknown	Unknown	Early 310	29 August 310 husband's death	Late 310	Liu Yuan
Empress Huyan		Unknown	Unknown	Unknown	310 husband's accession	312		Liu Cong
Empress Zhang Huiguang		Zhang Shi	Unknown	Early 313		313		Liu Cong
Empress Liu E		Unknown	Unknown	313		314		Liu Cong
Empress Jin Yueguang		Jin Zhun	Unknown	315		315 deposed	315	Liu Cong
Left Empress Liu		Unknown	Unknown	315		Before 318		Liu Cong
Empress Jin Yuehua		Jin Zhun	Unknown	315		31 August 318 husband's death	After 318	Liu Cong
Upper Empress Fan		Unknown	Unknown	316		31 August 318 husband's death	After 318	Liu Cong
Left Empress Wang		Wang Chen (Note: Adoptive father.)	Unknown	318		31 August 318 husband's death	After 318	Liu Cong
Middle Empress Xuan		Xuan Huai (Note: Adoptive father.)	Unknown	318		31 August 318 husband's death	After 318	Liu Cong
Empress Jin		Jin Zhun	Unknown	Before 318	September 318 husband's accession	September or October 318 husband's death	Unknown	Liu Can
Empress Yang Xianrong		Yang Xuanzhi	In or before 290	Possibly 319 (Note: It is unknown if she was a concubine or wife of Liu Yao before his accession to the throne.)	319	13 May 322		Liu Yao
Empress Liu		Unknown	Unknown	325		326		Liu Yao
Empress Liu		Unknown	Unknown	326		Between February and September 329 husband's death	Unknown	Liu Yao

==== Later Zhao (319–351) ====
Name	Parents	Birth	Marriage	Became Empress	Ceased to be Empress	Death	Spouse
Empress Liu	Unknown	Unknown	Before 330	330 husband's accession	17 August 333 husband's death	Fall 333	Shi Le
Empress Zheng Yingtao	Unknown	Unknown	Before 334	337	337 deposed	349	Shi Hu
Empress Du Zhu	Unknown	Unknown	337		348 deposed	Unknown	Shi Hu
Empress Liu	Liu Yao	318	348		26 May 349 husband's death	349	Shi Hu
Empress Zhang	Unknown	Unknown	Unknown	349 husband's accession	349 husband's deposition	349	Shi Zun

==== Ran Wei (350–352) ====
Name	Became Empress	Ceased to be Empress	Spouse
Empress Dong	350 husband's accession	17 May 352 husband's deposition	Ran Min

==== Former Liang (301–376) ====
Name	Became Princess/Empress	Ceased to be Princess/Empress	Death	Spouse
Princess Yan	324?	346 husband's death	Before 353	Zhang Jun
Princess Pei	346?	353 husband's death	354	Zhang Chonghua
Empress Xin	354	355 husband's death	Unknown	Zhang Zuo

==== Later Liang (386–403) ====
Name	Parents	Marriage	Became Princess/Empress	Ceased to be Princess/Empress	Death	Spouse
Princess Shi	Unknown	Before 383	389 (Note: If she was still alive in 396, she would have been created Empress.)	Unknown		Lü Guang
Empress Yang	Yang Huan	Unknown	400 husband's accession	401 husband's death	401	Lü Zuan
Empress Yang	Unknown	Unknown	401 husband's accession	Unknown		Lü Long

==== Western Liang (400–421) ====
Name	Became Princess	Ceased to be Princess	Death	Spouse
Princess Yin	N/A (Note: Yin never held the title of Princess during the reign of her husband Duke Li Gao. She was honoured as princess dowager after his death.)		After 437	Li Gao

==== Northern Liang (397–439) ====
Name	Parents	Birth	Marriage	Became Princess	Ceased to be Princess	Death	Spouse
Princess Meng	Unknown	Unknown	Unknown	401 husband's accession	433 husband's death	After 433	Juqu Mengxun
Princess Li Jingshou	Li Gao; Princess Dowager Yin	Unknown	420	433 husband's accession	437 marriage annulled	Unknown	Juqu Mujian
Princess Tuoba	Emperor Mingyuan of Northern Wei	386	437		439 husband's deposition	534 or 535	Juqu Mujian

==== Southern Liang (397–404, 408–414) ====
Name	Marriage	Became Princess	Ceased to be Princess	Death	Spouse
Queen Zhejue	Unknown	408	414 husband's deposition	Unknown	Tufa Rutan

==== Former Qin (351–394) ====
Name	Parents	Birth	Marriage	Became Empress	Ceased to be Empress	Death	Spouse
Empress Qiang	Unknown	Unknown	Unknown	351; Husband's accession	355; Husband's death	356	Fu Jian
Empress Liang	Liang An	Unknown	Before 355	July 355; Husband's accession	October 355; Executed		Fu Sheng
Empress Gou	Unknown	Unknown	Before 357	357; Husband's accession	16 October 385; Husband's death	Unknown	Fu Jian
Empress Yang	Unknown	Unknown	Before 380	385; Husband's accession	386; Husband's deposition	386	Fu Pi
Empress Mao	Mao Xing	Unknown	384?	387	389		Fu Deng
Empress Li	Unknown	Unknown	392		394; Husband's death	Unknown	Fu Deng

==== Later Qin (384–417 AD) ====
Name	Became Empress	Ceased to be Empress	Death	Spouse
Empress She	386	394, Husband's death	397	Yao Chang
Empress Zhang	402			Yao Xing
Empress Qi	412			Yao Xing
Empress Of an unknown clan	416	417		Yao Hong

==== Western Qin (385–400, 409–431 AD) ====
Name	Became Queen	Ceased to be Queen	Death	Spouse
Queen Bian	388	394, Deposed		Qifu Gangui
Queen Bian	394	400, Dynasty abolished		Qifu Gangui
Queen Bian	409, Dynasty re-established	412, Husband's death		Qifu Gangui
Queen Fu	394	394, Deposed		Qifu Gangui
Queen Tufa	late 414	423		Qifu Chipan
Queen Liang	429	431		Qifu Mumo

==== Former Yan (337–370 AD) ====
Name*	Became Princess/Empress	Ceased to be Princess/Empress	Death	Spouse
Empress Wenming, of the Duan clan	337	Unknown (Note: After her husband declared himself Emperor in 352, she was honored as an empress, although it was not clear whether she was still alive at that point.)		Murong Huang
Empress, Of the Kezuhun Clan	353	360		Murong Jun
Empress, Of the Kezuhun Clan	369	370, Dynasty abolished		Murong Wei
Personal name, posthumous name, maiden clan

==== Later Yan (384–409 AD) ====
Name*	Parents	Marriage	Became Empress	Ceased to be Empress	Death	Spouse
Duan Yuanfei, Empress Cheng'ai, of the Duan clan (Note: Yuanfei was her courtesy name)	Duan Yi	in or just prior to 388	388	2 June 396, Husband's death	396	Murong Chui
Empress Huide, of the Duan clan			396	May 27, 398, Husband's death	early 400	Murong Bao
Fu Xunying, Empress, of the Fu clan	Fu Mo		404	summer 407		Murong Xi
Empress, of the Li clan (Note: Her husband was either the last monarch of China's Later Yan dynasty or the founding monarch of China's Northern Yan dynasty, depending on the historian's characterization.)			408	November 6, 409, Husband's death	409?	Gao Yun
Personal name, posthumous name, maiden clan

==== Northern Yan (407–436 AD) ====
Name	Became Empress	Spouse
Princess Sun	409	Feng Ba
Princess Murong	431	Feng Hong

==== Southern Yan (398–410 AD) ====
Name	Parents	Marriage	Became Empress	Ceased to be Empress	Spouse
Duan Jifei (Note: Her given name is lost to history, but her courtesy name Jifei was recorded and used by historians.)	Duan Yi	in or just prior to 388	400	17 November 405, Husband's death	Murong De
Empress Huyan	Huyan Ping	403	408	March 25, 410, Husband's deposition	Murong Chao

==== Helian Xia (407–431 AD) ====
Name	Became Empress	Ceased to be Empress	Death	Spouse
Empress Liang	413/414	c. September 425, Husband's death (Note: In 427, when Emperor Taiwu of Northern Wei entered the Xia capital Tongwan (in modern Yulin, Shaanxi) after forcing Helian Bobo's successor Helian Chang to flee, he was mentioned as having captured Helian Bobo's and Helian Chang's empresses, and presumably the person referred to as Helian Bobo's empress was Empress Liang.)	after 427?	Helian Bobo
Empress, of an unknown clan		428, Husband's deposition		Helian Chang
Empress, of an unknown clan				Helian Ding

=== Northern and Southern dynasties (420–589 AD) ===
==== Liu Song (420–479 AD) ====
Name	Parents	Birth	Marriage	Became Empress	Ceased to be Empress	Death	Spouse
Sima Maoying, Empress, of the Sima clan of Henan	Emperor Gong of Jin, Empress Gongsi	393? or 403/4?	likely 419 or 420	26 June 422	7 July 424, Husband's death	439	Emperor Shao
Yuan Qigui, Empress Wenyuan of the Yuan clan of Chen Commandry	Yuan Dan, Lady Wang	405		26 October 424	8 September 440		Emperor Wen
Empress, of the Yin clan of Chen Commandry (Note: The name "Yuying" (玉英) is not found in historical records.)	Yin Chun		14 May 438	453	27 May 453		Liu Shao
Wang Xianyuan, Empress Xiaowuwenmu, of the Wang clan of Langya	Wang Yan, Liu Rongnan, Princess Wuxing	c.427	443	453	12 July 464, Husband's death	9 October 464	Emperor Xiaowu
Empress, of the Lu clan	Lu Daoqing			16 December 465	1 January 466		Emperor Qianfei
Wang Zhenfeng, Empress Minggong, of the Wang clan of Langya	Wang Senglang	436	448	22 January 466	15 July 472, Husband's death	12 November 479	Emperor Ming
Jiang Jiangui, Empress, of the Jiang clan of Jiyang	Jiang Jiyun		c. 470	15 July 472	23 June 479, Husband's death		Emperor Houfei
Xie Fanjing, Empress, of the Xie clan of Chen Commandry	Xie Yang		26 November 478		27 May 479, Husband's abdication		Emperor Shun
Personal name, posthumous name, maiden clan

==== Southern Qi ====
- 493–494: He Jingying
- 494: Wang Shaoming
- 498–501: Chu Lingqu
- 501–502: Wang Shunhua

==== Northern Wei ====
- 400–409: Empress Murong
- 432–452: Empress Helian
- 456–465: Empress Feng
- 493–497: Empress Feng Qing
- 497–499: Empress Feng Run
- 501–507: Empress Yu
- 508–515: Empress Gao
- 5??–528: Empress Hu
- 528–530: Empress Erzhu Ying'e
- 530–531: Empress Erzhu
- 532: Empress Erzhu
- 533–534: Empress Gao

==== Western Wei ====
- 535–538: Empress Yifu
- 538–540: Empress Yujiulü
- 553–554: Empress Yuwen
- 554–556: Empress Ruogan

==== Eastern Wei (534–550 AD) ====
Name	Parents	Marriage	Became Empress	Ceased to be Empress	Spouse
Empress Gao	Gao Huan, Emperor Shenwu of Northern Qi, Lou Zhaojun, Empress Wuming of Northern Qi	539		550, Husband's abdication	Emperor Xiaojing

==== Northern Qi ====
- 550–559: Empress Li Zu'e
- 560–561: Empress Yuan
- 561–565: Empress Hu
- 565–572: Empress Hulü
- 572–573: Empress Hu
- 572–577: Empress Mu

==== Liang dynasty ====
- 551: Empress Zhang
- Empress Wang
- 560–561: Empress Wang

==== Chen dynasty ====
- Zhang Yao'er
- Shen Miaorong
- Wang Shaoji
- Liu Jingyan
- Shen Wuhua

==== Northern Zhou ====
- 557–557: Empress Yuan Humo
- 568–568: Empress Dugu
- 568–578: Empress Ashina
- 578–579: Yang Lihua
- 579–580: Empress Sima Lingji

=== Sui dynasty (581–618 AD) ===
Name*	Picture	Parents	Birth	Became Empress	Ceased to be Empress	Death	Spouse
Dugu Qieluo/ Dugu Jialuo, Empress Wenxian, of the Dugu clan of Henan		Dugu Xin, Lady Cui	544	4 March 581	10 September 602		Emperor Wen
Empress Min, of the Xiao clan of Lanling		Xiao Kui, Emperor Ming of Western Liang, Lady Zhang	c. March 566	605	11 April 618,Husband's death	17 April 648	Emperor Yang
Personal name, posthumous name, maiden clan

=== Tang dynasty (618–907 AD) ===
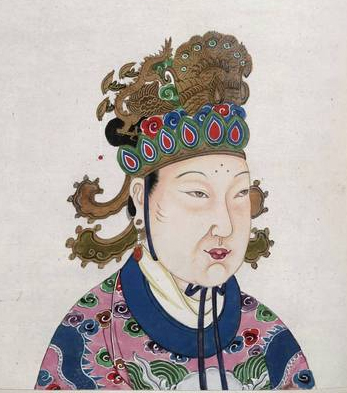
Wu Zetian, an empress consort of Emperor Gaozong who became the only Empress regnant in Chinese History widely recognized as legitimate. After the death of her husband and enthronement and depsoition of 2 of her sons, she became the sole ruler of China for 15 years (690 - 705 AD).

Name*	Picture	Parents	Birth	Marriage	Became Empress	Ceased to be Empress	Death	Spouse
Empress Wende, of the Zhangsun clan of Henan		Zhangsun Sheng, Zhangsun Cheng, Duke Xian of Qi, Lady Gao	15 March 601	613	4 September 626	28 July 636		Emperor Taizong
Empress, of the Wang clan of Taiyuan		Wang Renyou, Lady Liu	Unknown (Note: Historical sources did not indicate the year of Empress Wang's birth.)		12 February 650	16 November 655, Deposed	3 December 655	Emperor Gaozong
Wu Zhao, Empress Zetian, of the Wu clan (Note: Her cousin's son Zong Qinke created a number of new characters in December 689, and she chose 曌 as her given name, which became her taboo name when she ascended the throne the next year. Some sources assert that this character was actually written 瞾. Some sources (e.g., Bo Yang Edition of the Zizhi Tongjian, vols. 47–49) also assert that her original given name was Zhao and that in 689 she only changed the written character, but this is confirmed by neither the Old Book of Tang nor the New Book of Tang, neither of which stated her original given name. Her grandson Li Chongzhao, sometime after she became emperor, changed his name to Li Chongrun to observe naming taboo for her, and the character of "Zhao" in Li Chongzhao's name was 照. See Old Book of Tang, vol. 86 and New Book of Tang, vol. 81.) (Note: She is the only Empress Regnant in Chinese history considered Legitimate)		Wu Shiyue, Lady Yang	17 February 624 (Note: The birth year given here is deduced from the age at death given in the New Book of Tang, compiled in 1045–1060, which is the date favored by modern historians. The year of birth deduced from the age at death in the Old Book of Tang, compiled in 941–945, is 623. The year of birth deducted from the age at death and the age when she entered the palace, in the Zizhi Tongjian, compiled in 1065–84, is 17 February 624. Compare New Book of Tang, vol. 4 with Old Book of Tang, vol. 6 and Zizhi Tongjian 1084, vols. 195, 208)	650 (Note: Prior to becoming a consort of Emperor Gaozong, she was a consort of his father, Emperor Taizong, with the title of cáirén (才人), meaning 'Lady of Talent', a fifth rank consort of the Emperor)	22 November 655	27 December 683, Husband's death	16 December 705	Emperor Gaozong
Empress, of the Wei clan of Jingzhao		Wei Xuanzhen, Lady Cui			3 January 684	26 February 684, Husband's deposition	July 21, 710	Emperor Zhongzong
Empress, of the Wei clan of Jingzhao		Wei Xuanzhen, Lady Cui			23 February 705, Husband's restoration	3 July 710, Husband's death	July 21, 710	Emperor Zhongzong
Empress Suming, of the Liu clan of Pengcheng		Liu Yanjing			27 February 684	16 October 690, Husband's abdication	8 January 693	Emperor Ruizong
Empress, of the Lu clan					710	25 July 710, Husband's abdication		Emperor Shang
Empress, of Wang the clan of Taiyuan		Wang Renjiao, Duke of Qi			712	15 August 724, Deposed	c.November 724	Emperor Xuanzong
Empress, of the Zhang clan		Zhang Quyì			spring 758	May 16, 762		Emperor Suzong
Empress Zhaode, of the Wang clan		Wang Yu			December 3, 786	December 6, 786		Emperor Dezong
Empress, of the Zheng clan (Note: There is no record of her in the Old Book of Tang)								Emperor Wuzong
Empress Xuanmu, of the He clan					898	December 4, 900, Husband's abdication	22 January 906	Emperor Zhaozong
Empress Xuanmu, of the He clan					January 24, 901, Husband's restoration	September 22, 904, Husband's death	22 January 906	Emperor Zhaozong
Personal name, posthumous name, maiden clan

==== Qin ====
- Empress Ju

==== Han (Dingyang) ====
- Empress Ju

==== Xia (619–621 AD) ====
Name	Became Empress	Ceased to be Empress	Spouse
Empress Cao	c. 619	3 August 621, Husband's death	Dou Jiande

==== Yan (755–763 AD) ====
Name	Became Empress	Ceased to be Empress	Death	Spouse
Empress Duan	spring 756	spring 757		An Lushan
Empress Xin	759	18 April 761	after 18 April 761	Shi Shiming

==== Qi (881–884 AD) ====
Name	Became Empress	Ceased to be Empress	Death	Spouse
Empress Cao	881	July 13, 884	July 13, 884?	Huang Chao

=== Five Dynasties and Ten Kingdoms period (907–960 AD) ===
==== Qi (907–924 AD) ====
Name	Parents	Birth	Became Empress	Ceased to be Empress	Death	Spouse
Empress Liu	Liu Yuehuang	877	907	924, Husband's deposition	November 8, 943	Li Maozhen

==== Former Shu (907–925 AD) ====
Name*	Picture	Parents	Marriage	Became Empress	Ceased to be Empress	Death	Spouse
Empress Shunde, of the Zhou clan				908	July 11, 918, Husband's death	October 1, 918	Wang Jian
Empress, of the Gao clan		Gao Zhiyan	between 913 - 918	918	Unclear, (Note: In 921, he sent her back to the house of her father Gao Zhiyan, effectively deposing and divorcing her. In shock, Gao Zhiyan stopped eating and died thereafter.)		Wang Zongyan
Jin Feishan, Empress, of the Jin clan		Jin Ye	between 918 - 921	921	Unknown, Deposed	926	Wang Zongyan
Jin Feishan, Empress, of the Jin clan		Jin Ye	between 918 - 921	Unknown, Reinstated	925, Husband's deposition	926	Wang Zongyan
Personal name, posthumous name, maiden clan

==== Yan (911–914 AD) ====
Name	Became Empress	Ceased to be Empress	Death	Spouse
Empress Li	911	913	12 February 914	Liu Shouguang
Empress Zhu	911	913	12 February 914	Liu Shouguang

==== Later Liang (907–923 AD) ====
Name	Became Empress	Ceased to be Empress	Death	Spouse
Empress Zhang	912	March 27, 913		Zhu Yougui

==== Southern Han (917–971 AD) ====
Name	Parents	Marriage	Became Empress	Ceased to be Empress	Death	Spouse
Empress Ma	Ma Yin, King Wumu of Chu	915	919	935		Liu Yan

==== Later Tang ( 923–927 AD) ====
Name*	Parents	Birth	Marriage	Became Empress	Ceased to be Empress	Death	Spouse
Empress Shenminjing, of the Liu clan (Note: Her Chinese Wikipedia article and a number of modern sources, including, for example, the modern historian Bo Yang, give her name as Liu Yuniang (劉玉娘), but the name was not corroborated by traditional sources.)		892 or 893	908	923	May 15, 926, Husband's death	926	Li Cunxu
Empress Hewuxian, of the Cao clan				930	15 December 933, Husband's death	January 11, 937	Li Siyuan
Empress Ai, of the Kong clan	Kong Xun		c.928	933	24 May 934, Husband's death	934	Li Conghou
Empress, of the Liu clan	Liu Maowei/Liu Maocheng (Note: Her father's name was given as Liu Maowei (劉茂威) in her biography in the New History of the Five Dynasties, and she had a younger brother named Liu Yanhao, whose biography in the Old History of the Five Dynasties gave their father's name as Liu Maocheng (劉茂成).)			934	January 11, 937		Li Congke
Personal name, posthumous name, maiden clan

==== Yang Wu (907–937 AD) ====
Name	Became Empress	Ceased to be Empress	Spouse
Empress Wang	933	January 21, 939, Husband's abdication	Yang Pu

==== Min (909–945 AD) ====
Name	Parents	Birth	Marriage	Became Empress	Ceased to be Empress	Death	Spouse
Empress Chen Jinfeng	Chen Yan (Note: Her biography indicated that Chen Yan was not her biological father. Rather, Chen Yan had a homosexual affair with a young handsome man, Hou Lun (侯倫), who thereafter also had an affair with his concubine Lady Lu, leading to Lady Lu's pregnancy.); Lady Lu	893	927	935	17 November 935		Wang Yanjun
Empress Li Chunyan			935	936	August 29, 939, Husband's death	August 29, 939?	Wang Jipeng
Empress Li	Li Zhen			942	April 8, 944, Husband's death	944	Wang Yanxi
Empress Zhang (Note: Previously crowned as the Empress of Yin)				945			Wang Yanzheng

==== Southern Tang (937–976 AD) ====
Name*	Parents	Birth	Marriage	Became Empress/Queen	Ceased to be Empress/Queen	Death	Spouse
Song Wen, Empress Yuanjing, of the Song clan	Song Wen		before 927	937	March 30, 943, Husband's death	945	Li Bian
Empress Guangmu, of the Zhong clan	Zhong Taizhang		c. 923	943	961, Husband's death	September or October 965	Li Jing
Zhou Ehuang, Queen Zhaohui, of the Zhou clan	Zhou Zong	936 or early 937		961	8 December 964		Li Yu
Queen, of the Zhou clan	Zhou Zong		968		1 January 976, Husband's abdication		Li Yu
Personal name, posthumous name, maiden clan

==== Later Jin (936–947 AD) ====
Name	Parents	Marriage	Became Empress	Ceased to be Empress	Death	Spouse
Empress Li	Li Siyuan, Emperor Mingzong of Later Tang; Empress Cao	prior to 919	c. Late November 936/941 (Note: According to the Zizhi Tongjian, her creation was immediately upon his taking the throne as the emperor of Later Jin. According to the Wudai Huiyao, the creation did not occur until 941. According to the New History of the Five Dynasties, no formal creation ever occurred during Shi's lifetime.)	28 July 942, Husband's death	October 7, 950	Shi Jingtang
Empress Feng	Feng Meng	942	943	January 11, 947, Husband's deposition	prior to 974	Shi Chonggui

==== Yin ( 945–947 AD) ====
Name	Became Empress	Ceased to be Empress	Spouse
Empress Zhang	943	945 (Note: Crowned as the Empress of Min)	Wang Yanzheng

==== Later Han (947–951 AD) ====
Name	Became Empress	Ceased to be Empress	Death	Spouse
Empress Li	947	March 10, 948, Husband's death	954	Liu Zhiyuan

==== Later Zhou (951–960 AD) ====
Name*	Parents	Birth	Marriage	Became Empress	Ceased to be Empress	Death	Spouse
Empress Xuanyi, of the Fu clan	Fu Yanqing	931	951	23 May 954	29 August 956		Chai Rong
Empress, of the Fu clan	Fu Yanqing		17 July 959		27 July 959, Husband's death	993	Chai Rong
Personal name, posthumous name, maiden clan

==== Northern Han (951–979 AD) ====
Name	Became Empress	Ceased to be Empress	Death	Spouse
Empress, of an unknown clan	951			Liu Chong
Empress, of the Guo clan		968		Liu Jun
Empress, of the Ma clan	968			Liu Jiyuan

=== Liao dynasty (916–1125 AD) ===
Name*	Picture	Parents	Birth	Marriage	Became Empress	Ceased to be Empress	Death	Spouse
Shulü Ping, Empress Yingtian, of the Xiao clan (Note: She was initially given the posthumous name Empress Zhenlie (贞烈皇后/貞烈皇后), which was then changed to Empress Chunqin (淳钦皇后/淳欽皇后) and then finally changed to Empress Yingtian (应天皇后/應天皇后))			19 October 879		916	6 September 926, Husband's death	1 August 953	Abaoji, Emperor Taizu
Xiao Wen/ Shulü Wen, Empress Jing'an, of the Xiao clan (Note: She was initially given the posthumous name of Empress Zhangde (彰德皇后); her eventual posthumous name of Empress Jing'an (靖安皇后) was given by Emperor Xingzong.)		Shilü Shilu/Dilu (Note: It is uncertain whether her father's personal name was Shilu (室魯/室鲁) or Dilu (敵魯/敵鲁))		between 923 - 925	927	February 18, 935		Yaogu/ Deguang, Emperor Taizong
Empress, of the Zhen clan				946	947	October 7, 951, Husband's death	October 7, 951?	Wuyu/ Ruan, Emperor Shizong
Xiao Sagezhi, Empress Huaijie, of the Xiao clan (Note: After Yelü Chage's coup was put down by Emperor Shizong's cousin (Emperor Taizong's son) Emperor Muzong, he gave Empress Xiao the posthumous name of Empress Xiaolie (孝烈皇后). After Yelü Xian became emperor in 969 (as the future Emperor Jingzong), he buried both Empresses Zhen and Xiao at Yiwulü Mountain, and built a temple dedicated to them. In 1052, Emperor Jingzong's grandson Emperor Xingzong changed her posthumous name to Empress Huaijie (懷節皇后/怀節皇后).)		Shulü Aguzhi			948	October 7, 951, Husband's death	October 8, 951	Wuyu/ Ruan, Emperor Shizong
Xiao Chuo/ Xiao Yanyan, Empress Shèngshén Xuānxiàn, Empress Ruìzhì, of the Xiao clan		Xiao Siwen; Yelü Lübugu, Princess of Yan	953			13 October 982, Husband's death	29 December 1009	Xian, Emperor Jingzong
Empress, of the Xiao clan						Unknown, Deposed (Note: Demoted to the rank of Noble Consort (贵妃/貴妃),due to unspecified crimes)		Wenshunu/ Longxu, Emperor Shengzong
Xiao Pusage, Empress Rende, of the Xiao clan			983				1032	Wenshunu/ Longxu, Emperor Shengzong
Xiao Sanqian, Empress, of the Xiao clan						Unknown, Deposed (Note: Demoted to Noble Consort (贵妃/貴妃) due to an unspecified misdeed)		Zhigu/ Zongzhen, Emperor Xingzong
Xiao Dali, Empress Renyi, of the Xiao clan						28 August 1055, Husband's death	1076	Zhigu/ Zongzhen, Emperor Xingzong
Xiao Guanyin, Empress Xuanyi, of the Xiao clan		Xiao Hui; Yelü Shuogu	1040		1055	13 December 1075		Chala/ Hongji, Emperor Daozong
Xiao Tansi, Empress, of the Xiao clan						Unknown, Deposed (Note: Demoted to Consort of Conferred Kindness (惠妃) for an unknown reason)	1181	Chala/ Hongji, Emperor Daozong
Xiao Duolilan, Empress, of the Xiao clan						26 March 1125, Husband's deposition		Yanxi, Emperor Tianzuo
Personal name, posthumous name, maiden clan

==== Western Liao (Qara Khitai) (1124–1218 AD) ====
Name	Became Empress	Ceased to be Empress	Spouse
Empress Xiao Tabuyan (Note: She was known in Muslim sources as Kuyang or Orghina.)		1143, Husband's death	Dashi, Emperor Dezong
Empress Ju'erbiesu	1177	1211, Husband's abdication	Zhilugu, Tianxi Emperor

=== Song dynasty (960–1279 AD) ===
Empress Zheng of the Song dynasty

Name*	Picture	Parents	Birth	Marriage	Became Empress	Ceased to be Empress	Death	Spouse
Empress Xiaoming, of the Wang clan		Wang Rao	942		960	963		Emperor Taizu
Empress Xiaozhang, of the Song clan		Song Yanwo; Princess Yongning of the Later Han	952		968	14 November 976, Husband's death	995	Emperor Taizu
Empress Mingde, of the Li clan		Li Chuyun; Lady Chen	960	976	10 January 985	8 May 997, Husband's death	1004	Emperor Taizong
Empress Zhangmu, of the Guo clan (Note: Her original posthumous name was Empress Zhuangmu (庄穆皇后) but was changed to Empress Zhangmu (章穆皇后) in 1044)		Guo Shouwen; Lady Liang	c. 975	991	997	1007		Emperor Zhenzong
Liu E, Empress Zhangxian Mingsu, of the clan		Liu Tong; Lady Pang	969	997	1012	23 March 1022, Husband's death	1033	Emperor Zhenzong
Empress, of the Guo clan			1012	24 December 1024		1033	10 December 1035	Emperor Renzong
Empress Cisheng Guangxian, of the Cao clan			1016	1034		30 April 1063, Husband's death	November 16, 1079	Emperor Renzong
Empress Xuanren Shenglie, of the Gao clan		Gao Chunxian, Prince Chun; Lady Cao	1032	1046	1065	25 January 1067, Husband's death	1093	Emperor Yingzong
Empress Qinsheng, of the Xiang clan			1047		1068	1 April 1085, Husband's death	1102	Emperor Shenzong
Empress Zhaoci Shengxian/ Empress Yuanyou, of the Meng clan		Meng Yuen	1073	23 June 1092		17 October 1096, Deposed	12 May 1131	Emperor Zhezong
Empress Zhaohuai, of the Liu clan			1079		1100	23 June 1100, Husband's death	1113	Emperor Zhezong
Empress Xiangong, of the Wang clan (Note: After her death, she was at first given the Posthumous title of Empress Jinghe (靖和皇后) in 1108, which was changed to Empress Huigong (惠恭皇后) from 1110 and then finally changed to Empress Xiangong (顯恭皇后) in 1137)			1084	1099	1100	1108		Emperor Huizong
Empress Xiansu, of the Zheng clan (Note: After her death, she was at first given the posthumous title of Empress Ningde (寧德皇后) in 1130, which was then changed to Empress Xiansu (顯肅皇后),from an unknown date)			1079		20 March 1110	18 January 1126, Husband's abdication	8 October 1130	Emperor Huizong
Empress Renhuai, of the Zhu clan			1102	1116	1126	20 March 1127, Husband's deposition	1127	Emperor Qinzong
Xing Bingyi, Empress Xianjie, of the Xing clan			1106	1115	15 June 1127 (Note: As she was captured by the Jurchens,she was declared to be Empress in absentia)	26 March 1129, Husband's deposition	29 June 1139	Emperor Gaozong
Xing Bingyi, Empress Xianjie, of the Xing clan					20 April 1129, Husband's restoration	29 June 1139	29 June 1139	Emperor Gaozong
Empress Xiansheng Cilie, of the Wu clan		Wu Jin	11 September 1115		18 May 1143	24 July 1162, Husband's abdication	12 December 1197	Emperor Gaozong
Xia Shenfu, Empress Chenggong, of the Xia clan			1136	1162	16 November 1163	16 November 1163		Emperor Xiaozong
Empress Chengsu, of the Xie clan		Xia Ning	1135		12 September 1176	18 February 1189, Husband's abdication	13 June 1207	Emperor Xiaozong
Li Fengniang, Empress Ciyi, of the Li clan		Li Dao; Lady Zhang	1144		18 February 1189	24 July 1194, Husband's abdication	16 July 1200	Emperor Guangzong
Empress Gongshu, of the Han clan			1165		25 July 1194	14 December 1200		Emperor Ningzong
Yang Guizhi, Empress Gongsheng Renlie, of the Yang clan		Zhang Shansheng	30 June 1162	1195	29 December 1202	17 September 1224, Husband's death	18 January 1233	Emperor Ningzong
Xie Daoqing, Empress Shouhe, of the Xie clan		Xie Qubo, Prince of Wei	1210		14 January 1231	17 November 1264, Husband's death	1283	Emperor Lizong
Quan Jiu, Empress, of the Quan clan			1241	1261	10 February 1267	15 August 1274, Husband's death	1309	Emperor Duzong
Personal name, posthumous name, maiden clan

=== Yuan dynasty (1271–1368 AD) ===
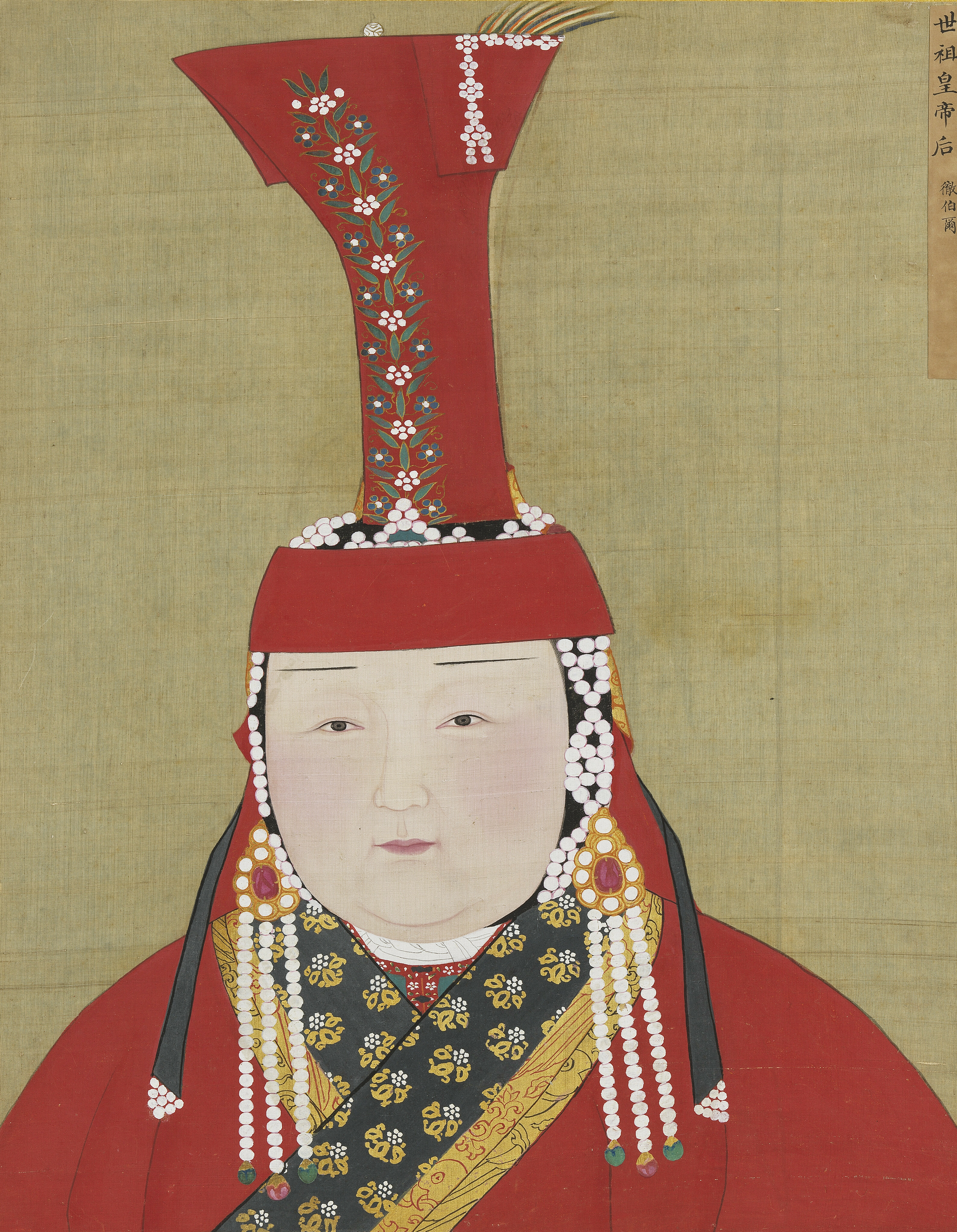
Empress Chabi, consort to Kublai Khan

Name	Picture	Parents	Birth	Marriage	Became Empress	Ceased to be Empress	Death	Spouse
Chabi, Empress Zhaorui Shunsheng, of the Khongirad clan		Anchen, Prince of Jining Zhongwu of Khongirad	28 January 1216	1239	1271	20 March 1281		Kublai, Emperor Shizu
Nambui, Empress, of the Khongirad clan		Nachen Küregen		1283		18 February 1294, Husband's death	Unknown	Kublai, Emperor Shizu
Talahai, Empress, of an Unknown clan								Kublai, Emperor Shizu
Nuhan, Empress, of an Unknown clan								Kublai, Emperor Shizu
Bayaujin, Empress, of the Bayauts clan		Boraqchin						Kublai, Emperor Shizu
Kökelün, Empress, of an Unknown clan								Kublai, Emperor Shizu
Bulugan/ Bulukhan, Empress, of the Bayad clan		Torgus Küregen			1305	10 February 1307, Husband's death	1307	Temür, Emperor Chengzong
Zhenge, Empress Xuanci Huisheng, of the Khongirad clan		Bengbula			1310	27 January 1311, Husband's death	November 1327	Khayishan, Emperor Wuzong
Radnashiri/ Aradnashiri/ Anashisari, Empress Zhuangyi Cisheng, of the Khongirad clan					7 April 1311	1 March 1320, Husband's death	1322	Ayurbarwada, Emperor Renzong
Sugabala/ Sügebala, Empress Zhuangjing Yisheng, of the Khongirad clan		Ashi Küregen, Princess Ilig Qaya			1321	September 4, 1323, Husband's death	1327	Shidibala, Emperor Yingzong
Babukhan, Empress, of the Khongirad clan		Woliuchar or Maizhuhan			1324	15 August 1328, Husband's death		Yesün Temür, Taiding Emperor
Budashiri/ Buddhashiri/ Putashali, Empress, of the Khongirad clan		Diwabala, Sengge Ragi, Princess Supreme of Lu	c. 1307	1324	16 October 1328	26 February 1329, Husband's abdication	c. 1340	Tugh Temür, Emperor Wenzong
Budashiri/ Buddhashiri/ Putashali, Empress, of the Khongirad clan		Diwabala, Sengge Ragi, Princess Supreme of Lu	c. 1307	1324	8 September 1329, Husband's Restoration	2 September 1332, Husband's death	c. 1340	Tugh Temür, Emperor Wenzong
Babusha, Empress, of the Naiman tribe		Lord Naiman, Princess Shouning			1329	1330, Husband's death	1330	Khüslen/ Kusalaa/ Küsala, Emperor Mingzong
Daliyetemishi, Daritemish, Empress, of the Khongirad clan		Lord Khongirad			1332	1332, Husband's death	1368	Rinchinbal, Emperor Ningzong
Danashri, Empress, of the Kipchak tribe		El Temür, Lady Kipchak	1320	1333		1335, Deposed	1335	Toghon Temür, Emperor Huizong
Bayan Khutugh/ Bayan Qudu, Empress, of the Khongirad clan		Bolad Temür	1324	1337		1365		Toghon Temür, Emperor Huizong
Öljei Khutuk, Empress Puxian Shusheng, of the Korean Haengju Gi clan (Note: Öljei Khutuk is her Mongolian name.Her birth name is unrecorded)		Ki Cha-o, Prince Yeong-an, Lady Yi of the Iksan Yi clan	1315		1365	10 September 1368, Dynasty abolished	1369?	Toghon Temür, Emperor Huizong
Personal name, posthumous name, maiden clan

=== Ming dynasty (1368–1644 AD) ===
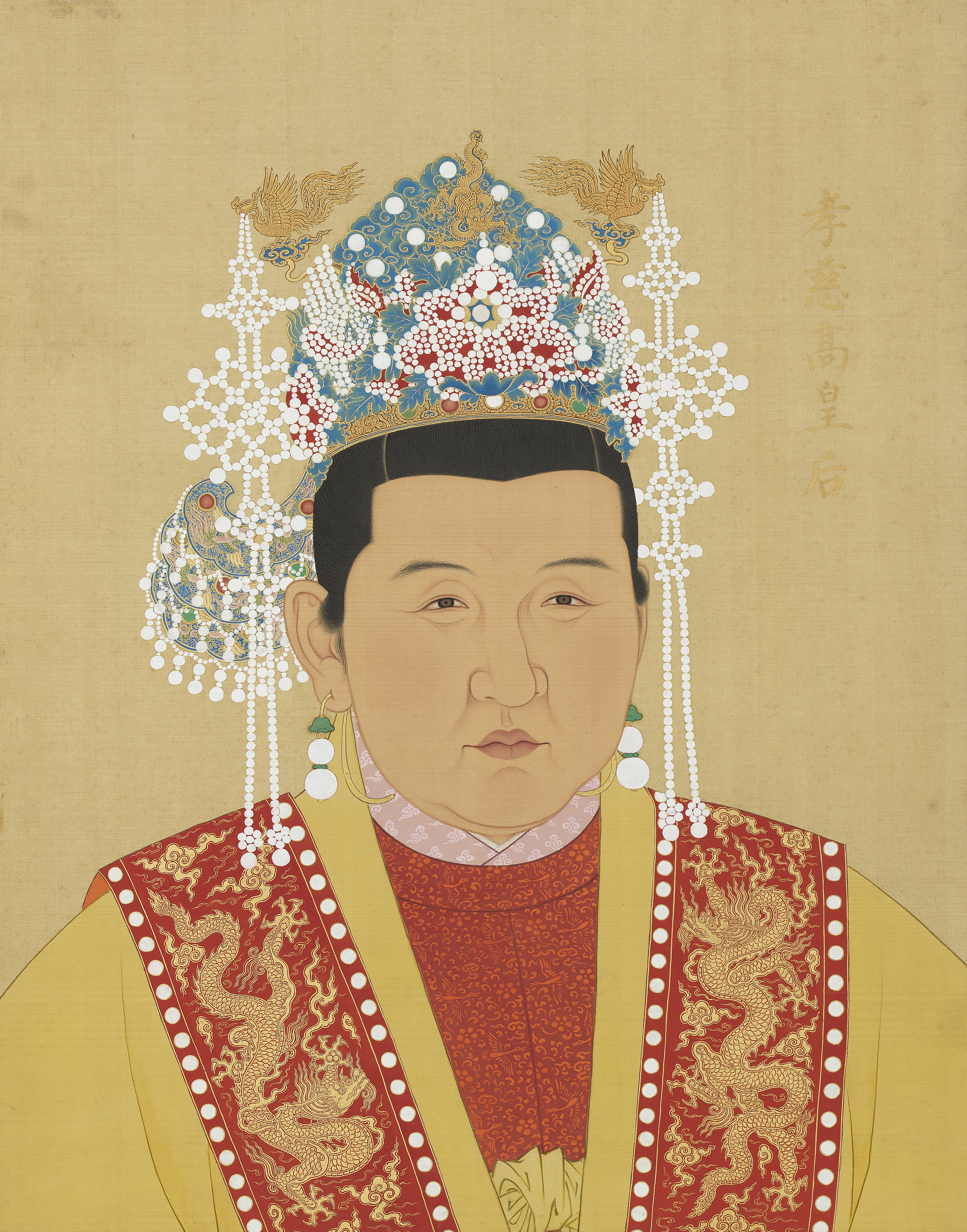
Empress Xiaocigao, Ming dynasty

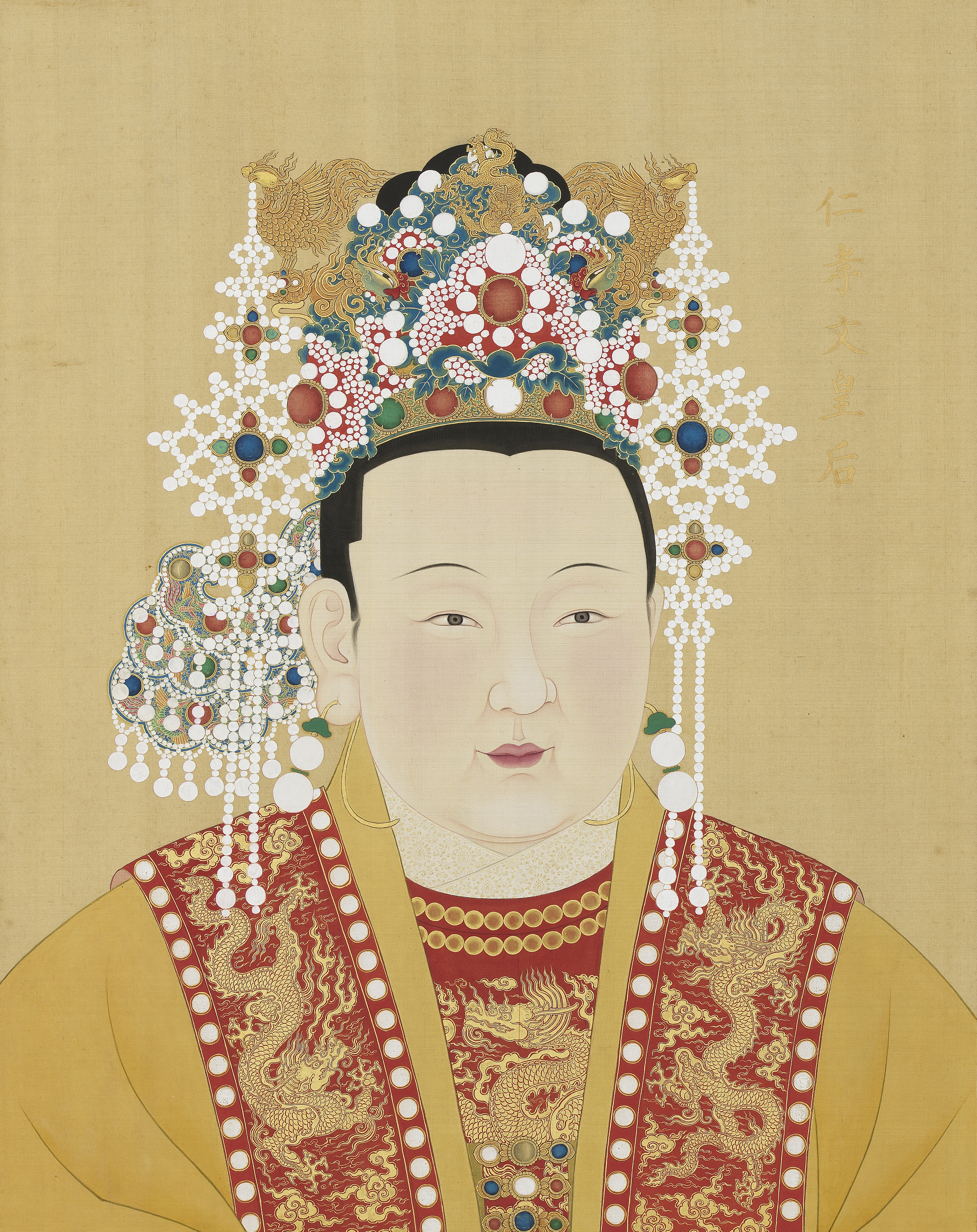
Empress Xu, Ming dynasty

Name*	Picture	Parents	Birth	Marriage	Became Empress	Ceased to be Empress	Death	Spouse
Empress Xiaocigao, of the Ma clan (Note: The name Ma Xiuying (馬秀英/马秀英),was never mentioned in any official records, including the History of Ming.)		Lord Ma, Prince of Xu; Zheng Ao, Consort of Prince of Xu	18 July 1332	1352	23 January 1368	23 September 1382		Hongwu Emperor
Empress Xiaominrang, of the Ma clan		Ma Quan	1378	1395	20 March 1399	13 July 1402		Jianwen Emperor
Empress Renxiaowen, of the Xu clan		Xu Da, Prince of Zhongshan; Lady Xie	5 March 1362	17 February 1376	17 July 1402	6 August 1407		Yongle Emperor
Empress Chengxiaozhao, of the Zhang clan		Zhang Qi, Marquis of Pengcheng; Lady Tong	1379	1395/1396	29 October 1424	29 May 1425, Husband's death	20 November 1442	Hongxi Emperor
Hu Shanxiang, Empress Gongrangzhang, of the Hu clan		Hu Rong; Lady Liu	c. 1400	1417	27 June 1425	1428, Deposed	5 December 1443	Xuande Emperor
Empress Xiaogongzhang, of the Sun clan		Sun Zhong; Dong Yuanzhen	c. 1399	1417	1428	1435, Husband's death	26 September 1462	Xuande Emperor
Empress Xiaozhuangrui, of the Qian clan		Qian Gui; Lady Chen	1426	8 June 1442	8 June 1442	22 September 1449, Husband's abdication	15 July 1468	Emperor Yingzong
Empress Xiaozhuangrui, of the Qian clan		Qian Gui; Lady Chen	1426	8 June 1442	11 February 1457, Husband's restoration	23 February 1464, Husband's death	15 July 1468	Emperor Yingzong
Empress Xiaoyuanjing, of the Wang clan		Wang Ying	1427	1445	22 September 1449	May 1452, Deposed	1506	Jingtai Emperor
Empress Suxiao, of the Hang clan		Hang Yu			May 1452	1456		Jingtai Emperor
Empress, of the Wu clan		Wu Jun	15th century	20 July 1464		1464, Deposed	1509	Chenghua Emperor
Empress Xiaozhenchun, of the Wang clan		Wang Zhen	1440/1450	1464		1487, Husband's death	1518	Chenghua Emperor
Empress Xiaochengjing, of the Zhang clan		Zhang Luan, Duke of Chang; Lady Jin	1471	1487	22 September 1487	8 June 1505, Husband's death	28 August 1541	Hongzhi Emperor
Empress Xiaojingyi, of the Xia clan		Xia Ru, Count of Qingyang; Lady Ye	1492	1506		20 April 1521, Husband's death	26 February 1535	Zhengde Emperor
Empress Xiaojiesu, of the Chen clan		Chen Wanyan	1508	1522		1528		Jiajing Emperor
Zhang Qijie, Empress, of the Zhang clan		Zhang Ji; Lady Xue		1526	8 January 1529	1534, Deposed	1537	Jiajing Emperor
Empress Xiaolie, of the Fang clan		Fang Tai	1516	1531	1534	1547		Jiajing Emperor
Empress Xiao'an, of the Chen clan		Chen Jingxing		1558	1567	5 July 1572, Husband's death	1596	Longqing Emperor
Wang Xijie, Empress Xiaoduanxian, of the Wang clan		Wang Wei, Count of Yongnian	7 November 1564	19 July 1578		7 May 1620		Wanli Emperor
Empress Xiao'aizhe, of the Zhang clan		Zhang Guoji, Marquis of Taikang	1606	1621		30 September 1627, Husband's death	24 April 1644	Tianqi Emperor
Empress Xiaojielie, of the Zhou clan		Zhou Kui, Marquis of Jiading; Lady Ding			1628	24 April 1644		Chongzhen Emperor
Personal name, posthumous name, maiden clan

==== Southern Ming (1644–1662 AD) ====
Name*	Parents	Birth	Became Empress	Ceased to be Empress	Death	Spouse
Empress Xiaozhejian, of the Huang clan						Hongguang Emperor
Empress Xiaoyixiang, of the Zeng clan	Zeng Wenyan, Earl of Jishui; Lady He	1605	1645	17 September 1646		Longwu Emperor
Empress Xiaogangkuang, of the Wang clan (Note: She converted to Roman Catholicism and adopted the name Anne.)				1662		Yongli Emperor
Personal name, posthumous name, maiden clan

=== Qing dynasty (1636–1912 AD) ===
Emperor	Empress consort*	Picture	Parents	Birth	Marriage	Became empress consort	Ceased to be empress consort	Death
Hong Taiji	Jerjer, Empress Xiaoduanwen of the Mongol Borjigit clan		Manggusi; Gunbu	31 May 1599	28 May 1614	August 1636	21 September 1643 husband's death	28 May 1649
Fulin, the Shunzhi Emperor	Erdeni Bumba, Empress of the Mongol Borjigit clan		Wukeshan		27 September 1651		25 October 1653 deposed	Unknown (Note: Some sources claim, that when she was living in Palace of Eternal Longevity, she became pregnant. During her pregnancy, she left the Forbidden City and gave birth to a son. However, historical records don't mention her further fate.)
Fulin, the Shunzhi Emperor	Alatan Qiqige, Empress Xiaohuizhang of the Mongol Borjigit clan		Chuo'erji; Lady Aisin Gioro	5 November 1641	June/ July 1654	July/August 1654	5 February 1661 husband's death	7 January 1718
Xuanye, the Kangxi Emperor	Empress Xiaochengren of the Manchu Hešeri clan		Gabula	3 February 1654	October/November 1665		6 June 1674	
Xuanye, the Kangxi Emperor	Empress Xiaozhaoren of the Manchu Niohuru clan		Ebilun; Lady Šušu-Gioro	1653		18 September 1677	18 March 1678	
Xuanye, the Kangxi Emperor	Empress Xiaoyiren of the Manchu Tunggiya clan		Guowei; Lady Hešeri		1676	23 August 1689	24 August 1689	
Yinzhen, the Yongzheng Emperor	Duoqimuli, Empress Xiaojingxian of the Manchu Ula-nara clan		Fiyanggū; Lady Aisin Gioro	28 June 1681	1691	28 March 1723	29 October 1731	
Hongli, the Qianlong Emperor	Empress Xiaoxianchun of the Manchu Fuca clan		Lirongbao; Lady Gioro	28 March 1712	3 September 1727	23 January 1738	8 April 1748	
Hongli, the Qianlong Emperor	Empress of the Manchu Nara clan		Narbu; Lady Langgiya	11 March 1718		2 September 1750	19 August 1766	
Yongyan, the Jiaqing Emperor	Empress Xiaoshurui of the Manchu Hitara clan		He'erjing'e; Lady Wanggiya	2 October 1760	5 June 1774	12 February 1796	5 March 1797	
Yongyan, the Jiaqing Emperor	Empress Xiaoherui of the Manchu Niohuru clan		Gūnggala; Lady Yehe Nara	20 November 1776	1790	27 May 1801	2 September 1820 husband's death	23 January 1850
Mianning, the Daoguang Emperor	Empress Xiaoshencheng of the Manchu Tunggiya clan		Sumingga	5 July 1792	2 February 1809	28 December 1822	16 June 1833	
Mianning, the Daoguang Emperor	Empress Xiaoquancheng of the Manchu Niohuru clan		Yiling; Lady Uya	24 March 1808	1821	18 November 1834	13 February 1840	
Yizhu, the Xianfeng Emperor	Empress Xiaozhenxian of the Manchu Niohuru clan		Muyang'a; Lady Giyanggiya	12 August 1837	1851/late 1840s (Note: The auditions for the Xianfeng Emperor's consorts took place in 1851 in the Forbidden City. Lady Niohuru was among the candidates shortlisted by Dowager Consort Kangci, the highest ranked living consort of the Daoguang Emperor at the time. However, some sources claimed that Lady Niohuru entered the Forbidden City in the late 1840s and became a concubine of the Xianfeng Emperor, who was still known as the Fourth Prince then.)	November/December 1852	22 August 1861 husband's death	8 April 1881
Zaichun, the Tongzhi Emperor	Empress Xiaozheyi of the Manchu Arute clan		Chongqi Lady Aisin Gioro	25 July 1854	1872	15 October 1872	12 January 1875 husband's death	27 March 1875
Zaitian, the Guangxu Emperor	Jingfen, Empress Xiaodingjing of the Manchu Yehe-nara clan		Guixiang; Lady Aisin Gioro	28 January 1868	26 February 1889	26 February 1889	14 November 1908 husband's death	22 February 1913
Puyi, the Xuantong Emperor	Wanrong, Empress Xiaokemin of the Manchu Gobulo clan		Rongyuan; Hengxin	13 November 1906	1922	(titular)	(titular)	20 June 1946
Personal name, posthumous name, maiden clan

== Empresses dowager ==
The title of Empress dowager (皇太后, húangtàihòu) was automatically given to a former Empress consort and widow of an Emperor. The title, Empress dowager, could be granted a widow of an Emperor even when she had not been the Empress consort during the reign of her spouse. Therefore, a separate list is given of the Empresses dowager, which, in some cases, equals the list of Empresses consort, and in other cases, not.

=== Qin dynasty ===
- Empress Dowager Zhao (Posthumously) (帝太后), wife of King Zhaoxiang and mother of Qin Shi Huang

=== Han dynasty ===
- Empress Dowager Lü,
- Empress Dowager Bo
- Empress Dowager Dou
- Empress Dowager Wang
- Empress Dowager Shangguan
- Empress Dowager Wang
- Empress Dowager Wang
- Empress Dowager Zhao
- Grand Empress Dowager Fu
- Empress Dowager Ding (帝太后)
- Empress Dowager Wang
- Empress Dowager Yin
- Empress Dowager Ma
- Empress Dowager Dou
- Empress Dowager Deng
- Empress Dowager Yan
- Empress Dowager Liang
- Empress Dowager Dou
- Empress Dowager He

=== Northern Dynasties ===
==== Northern Wei ====
- Princess Dowager Helan
- Empress Dowager Helian
- Nurse empress dowager
- Empress Dowager Feng(Empress Dowager Wenming)
- Empress Dowager Gao
- Empress Dowager Hu

=== Tang dynasty ===
- 683–690: Empress Dowager Wu
- 710: Empress Dowager Wei
- 805–816: Empress Dowager Wang
- 820–848: Empress Dowager Guo
- 824–845: Empress Dowager Wang
- 826–847: Empress Dowager Xiao
- 846–865: Empress Dowager Zheng
- 904–906: Empress Dowager He

=== Song dynasty ===
- Empress Dowager Du
- Empress Dowager Li
- Empress Dowager Liu
- Empress Dowager Yang
- Empress Dowager Cao
- Empress Dowager Gao
- Empress Dowager Xiang
- Empress Dowager Meng
- Empress Dowager Liu
- Empress Dowager Wei
- Empress Dowager Wu
- Empress Dowager Xie
- Empress Dowager Li
- Empress Dowager Yang
- Empress Dowager Xie
- Empress Dowager Quan
- Empress Dowager Yang

=== Yuan dynasty ===
- Empress Dowager Khongirad
- Empress Dowager Naimans
- Empress Dowager Oirats
- Empress Dowager Khongirad
- Empress Dowager Khongirad
- Empress Dowager Khongirad
- Empress Dowager Khongirad
- Empress Dowager Khongirad

=== Ming dynasty ===
- Empress Dowager Lü
- 1425 - 1435; Empress Dowager Zhang, wife of the Hongxi Emperor and mother of the Xuande Emperor
- 1435 -1462; Empress Dowager Sun, second wife of the Xuande Emperor and mother of Emperor Yingzong
- 1449 -1457; Empress Dowager Wu, concubine of the Xuande Emperor and mother of the Jingtai Emperor
- 1464 -1468; Empress Dowager Qian, wife of Emperor Yingzong and stepmother of the Chenghua Emperor
- 1464 -1487; Empress Dowager Zhou, concubine of Emperor Yingzong and mother of the Chenghua Emperor
- 1487-1505; Empress Dowager Wang, wife of the Chenghua Emperor and stepmother of the Hongzhi Emperor
- 1505 - 1541; Empress Dowager Zhang, wife of the Hongzhi Emperor and mother of the Zhengde Emperor
- 1521 - 1538; Empress Dowager Jiang, wife of Emperor Ruizong and mother of the Jiajing Emperor
- 1521 - 1522; Empress Dowager Xiaohui, consort of the Chenghua Emperor and paternal grandmother of the Jiajing Emperor
- Empress Dowager Du (Posthumously), concubine of the Jiajing Emperor and mother of the Longqing Emperor
- 1572 - 1596; Empress Dowager Chen, second wife of the Longqing Emperor and stepmother of the Wanli Emperor
- 1572 - 1614; Empress Dowager Li, concubine of the Longqing Emperor and mother of the Wanli Emperor
- Empress Dowager Wang (Posthumously), concubine of the Wanli Emperor and mother of the Taichang Emperor
- Empress Dowager Wang (Posthumously), concubine of the Taichang Emperor and mother of the Tianqi Emperor
- Empress Dowager Liu (Posthumously), concubine of the Taichang Emperor and mother of the Chongzhen Emperor

=== Qing dynasty ===
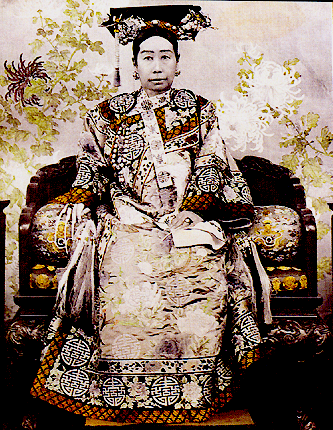
Empress Dowager Cixi, Qing dynasty

- 1643–1688: Empress Dowager Zhaosheng, concubine of Hong Taiji and mother of the Shunzhi Emperor
- 1661–1663: Empress Dowager Cihe, concubine of the Shunzhi Emperor and mother of the Kangxi Emperor
- 1661–1718: Empress Dowager Renxian, second wife of the Shunzhi Emperor and stepmother of the Kangxi Emperor
- 1722–1723: Empress Dowager Renshou, concubine of the Kangxi Emperor and mother of the Yongzheng Emperor
- 1735–1777: Empress Dowager Chongqing, concubine of the Yongzheng Emperor and mother of the Qianlong Emperor
- 1820–1850: Empress Dowager Gongci, second wife of the Jiaqing Emperor and stepmother of the Daoguang Emperor
- 1855: Empress Dowager Kangci, concubine of the Daoguang Emperor and stepmother of the Xianfeng Emperor, the only Qing dynasty empress dowager who was neither the previous emperor's empress consort nor the current emperor's mother
- 1861–1881: Empress Dowager Ci'an, wife of the Xianfeng Emperor and stepmother of the Tongzhi Emperor
- 1861–1908: Empress Dowager Cixi, concubine of the Xianfeng Emperor and mother of the Tongzhi Emperor
- 1908–1913: Empress Dowager Longyu, wife of the Guangxu Emperor and adoptive mother of the Xuantong Emperor

== Empresses whose titles were granted posthumously ==
=== Sui dynasty ===
- 581: Empress Lü Gutao, mother of Emperor Wen of Sui

=== Tang dynasty ===
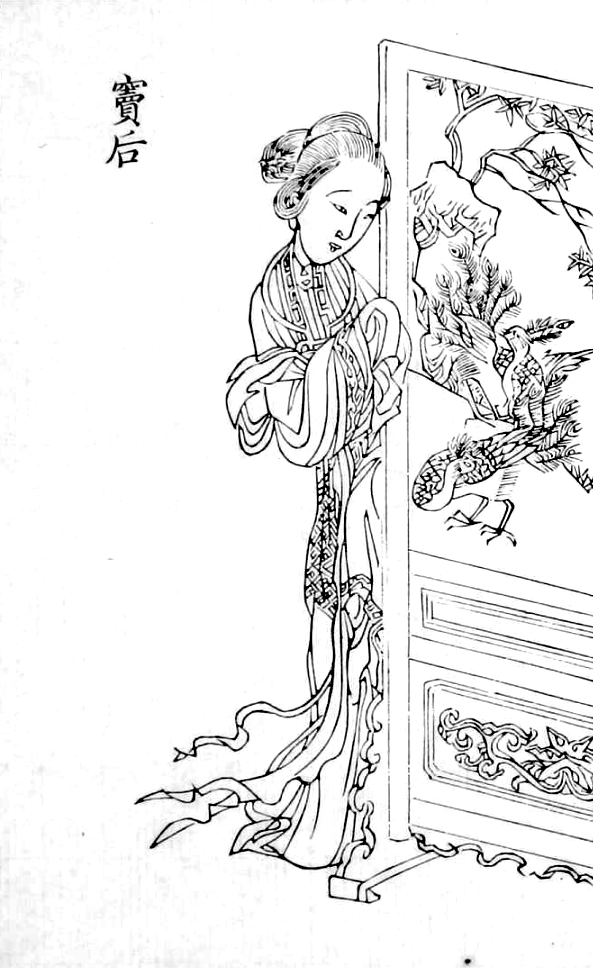
Qing dynasty illustration of Empress Taimu

- 618: Empress Dugu (Empress Yuanzhen, mother of Emperor Gaozu of Tang),
- 618: Duchess Dou (Empress Taimu), wife of Li Yuan, Emperor Gaozu of Tang before Li Yuan's ascension
- Crown Princess Zhao (Empress Hesi), Crown Princess and first wife of Emperor Zhongzong of Tang
- 716: Consort Dou (Empress Zhaocheng), Consort of Emperor Ruizong of Tang and mother of Emperor Xuanzong of Tang
- 738: Wu Huifei (Empress Zhenshun), favoured consort of Emperor Xuanzong of Tang (Note: Her "empress" title and all other honours were divested by Emperor Suzong of Tang)
- c.756: Noble Concubine Yang (Empress Yuanxian), concubine of Emperor Xuanzong of tang and mother of Emperor Suzong of Tang
- 775: Noble Consort Dugu (Empress Zhenyi), concubine of Emperor Daizong of Tang
- 806: Consort Shen (Empress Ruizhen), concubine of Emperor Daizong of Tang and mother of Emperor Dezong of Tang
- 816: Empress Dowager Wang (Empress Zhuangxian), concubine of Emperor Shunzong of Tang and mother of Emperor Xianzong of Tang
- Consort Wei (Empress Xuanyi), Concubine of Emperor Muzong of Tang and mother of Emperor Wuzong of Tang
- 845: Empress Dowager Wang (Empress Gongxi),Concubine of Emperor Muzong of Tang and mother of Emperor Jingzong of Tang
- 847: Empress Dowager Xiao (Empress Zhenxian), Concubine of Emperor Muzong of Tang and mother of Emperor Wenzong of Tang
- 848 : Empress Dowager Guo (Empress Yi'an), Concubine of Emperor Xianzong of Tang and mother of Emperor Muzong of Tang
- 859: Consort Cao (Empress Yuanzhao), Concubine of Emperor Xuānzong of Tang and mother of Emperor Yizong of Tang
- 865: Empress Dowager Zheng (Empress Xiaoming), Concubine of Emperor Xianzong of Tang and mother of Emperor Xuānzong of Tang
- 873: Noble Consort Wang (Emperss Hui'an), Concubine of Emperor Yizong of Tang and mother of Emperor Xizong of Tang
- 888: Consort Wang (Empress Gongxian), Concubine of Emperor Yizong of Tang and mother of Emperor Zhaozong of Tang

=== Wu Zhou dynasty ===
- Lady Pei (Empress Chengzhuang), Great-Great-Great-Grandmother of Wu Zetian
- Lady Liu (Empress Zhangjing), Great-Great-Grandmother of Wu Zetian
- Lady Song (Empress Zhao'an), Great-grandmother of Wu Zetian
- Lady Zhao (Empress Wenmu), Grandmother of Wu Zetian
- Lady Yang (Empress Xiaominggao), Mother of Wu Zetian

=== Song dynasty ===
- 961: Empress Dowager Du, mother of Emperor Taizu and Emperor Taizong
- 960: Empress He, married to Emperor Taizu
- 976: Empress Yin, married to Emperor Taizong
- 976: Empress Fu, married to Emperor Taizong
- 997: Empress Li, mother of Emperor Zhenzong
- 997: Princess Pan, married to Emperor Zhenzong
- 1033: Consort Li, mother of Emperor Renzong
- 1036: Empress Yang, married to Emperor Zhenzong
- 1054: Empress Zhang, married to Emperor Renzong
- 1101: Empress Chen, mother of Emperor Huizong
- 1102: Empress Zhu, mother of Emperor Zhezong
- 1113: Empress Mingda, married to Emperor Huizong
- 1121: Empress Mingzhe, married to Emperor Huizong
- 1159: Empress Xianren, mother of Emperor Gaozong
- 1162: Empress Chengmu, married to Emperor Xiaozong

=== Yuan dynasty ===
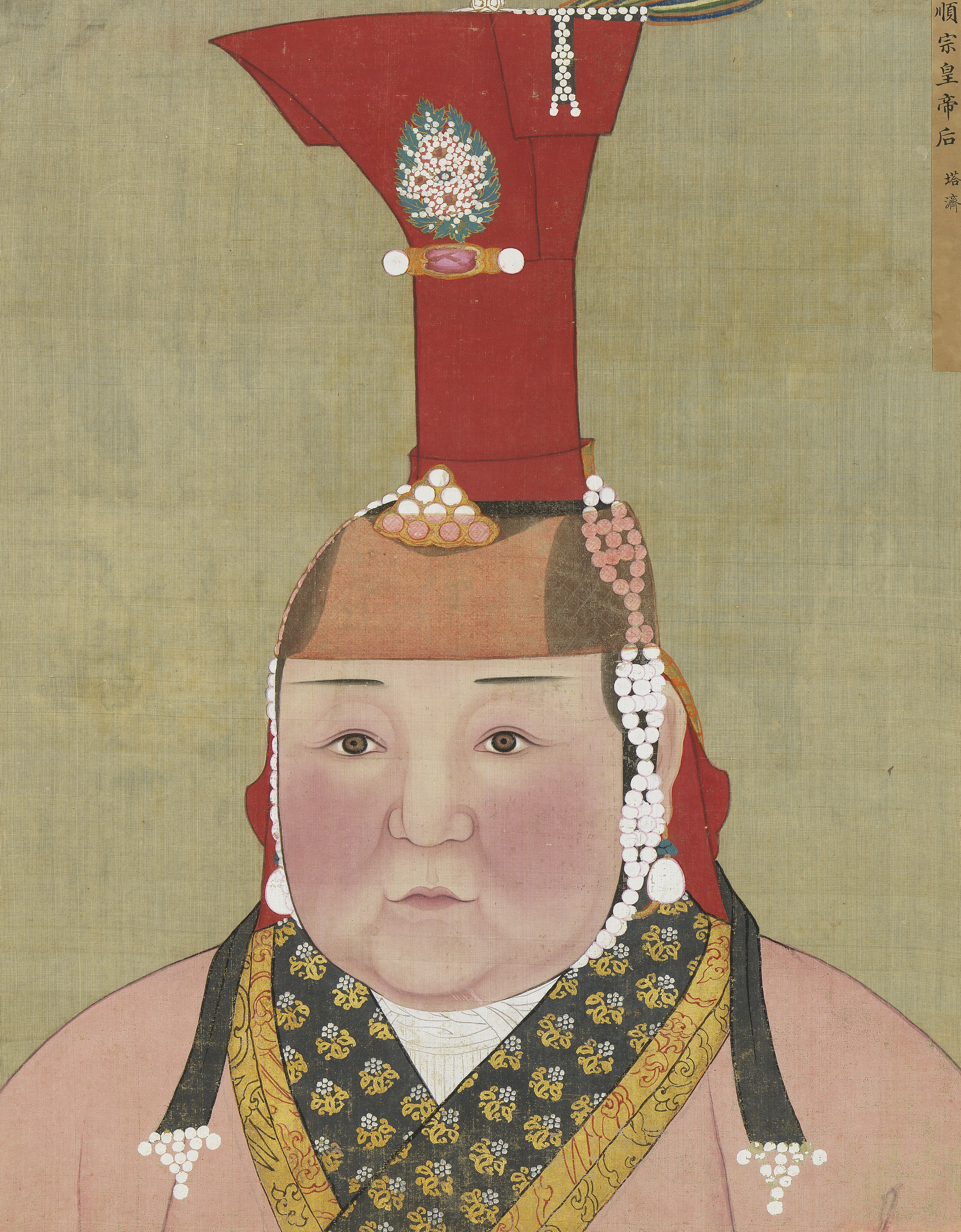
Portrait of Dagi Khatun

- Sorghaghtani Beki (Empress Xianyi Zhuangsheng), mother of Emperor Shizu
- 1300: Kökejin (Empress Huiren Yusheng), mother of Emperor Chengzong
- 1322: Dagi Khatun (Empress Zhaoxian Yuansheng), mother of Emperor Wuzong and Emperor Renzong
- 1329: Empress Wenxianzhaosheng, mother of Emperor Wenzong
- 1336: Mailaiti, mother of Emperor Huizong

=== Ming dynasty and Southern Ming dynasty ===
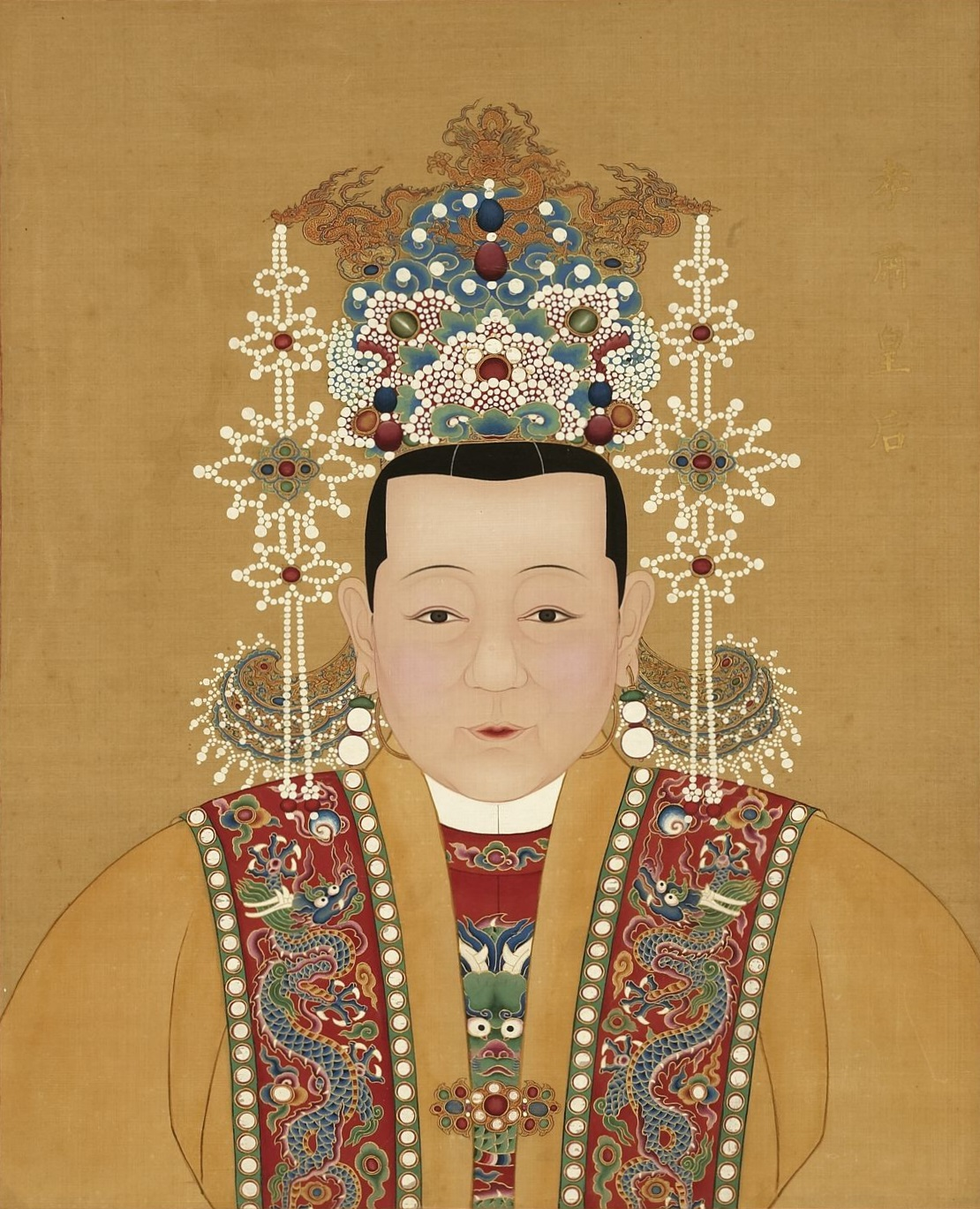
Portrait of Empress Xiaosu

- 1368: Empress Yu, paternal grandmother of the Hongwu Emperor
- 1368: Empress Chun, mother of the Hongwu Emperor
- 1487: Empress Ji, mother of the Hongzhi Emperor
- 1504: Empress Xiaosu, mother of the Chenghua Emperor
- 1566: Empress Xiaoke, mother of the Longqing Emperor
- 1566: Empress Xiaoyizhuang, married to the Longqing Emperor
- 1614: Empress Xiaoding, mother of the Wanli Emperor
- 1620: Empress Xiaojing, mother of the Taichang Emperor
- 1644: Empress Xiaozhejian
- 1644: Empress Xiaoyi, mother of the Jingtai Emperor
- 1644: Empress Xiaoxu

=== Qing dynasty ===
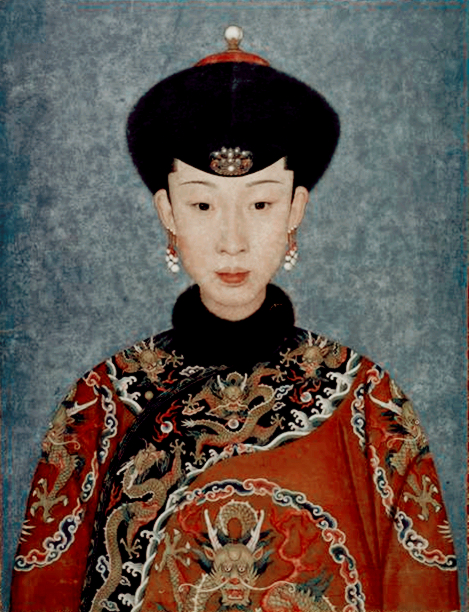
Empress Xiaoyichun, Qing dynasty

- 1626: Empress Xiaoliewu, married to Nurhaci
- 1636: Empress Xiaocigao, mother of Hong Taiji
- 1660: Empress Xiaoxian, married to the Shunzhi Emperor
- 1663: Empress Xiaokangzhang, concubine of the Shunzhi Emperor and mother of the Kangxi Emperor
- 1688: Empress Xiaozhuangwen, mother of the Shunzhi Emperor and grandmother of the Kangxi Emperor
- 1723: Empress Xiaogongren, concubine of the Kangxi Emperor and mother of the Yongzheng Emperor
- 1777: Empress Xiaoshengxian, mother of the Qianlong Emperor
- 1796: Empress Xiaoyichun, concubine of the Qianlong Emperor and mother of the Jiaqing Emperor
- 1820: Empress Xiaomucheng, married to the Daoguang Emperor
- 1850: Empress Xiaodexian, married to the Xianfeng Emperor
- 1855: Empress Xiaojingcheng, concubine to the Daoguang Emperor and step-mother of the Xianfeng Emperor, the only Qing dynasty empress who was neither the previous emperor's empress consort nor the current emperor's mother
- 1908: Xingzhen, Empress Xiaoqinxian, married to Xianfeng Emperor, mother of Tongzhi Emperor

== See also ==
- Imperial Chinese harem system
- Chinese nobility
- Ranks of imperial consorts in China
- Imperial consorts of Tang China
- Grand empress dowager
- Empress dowager
- Nurse empress dowager
- Consort clan
- List of Chinese monarchs
