= Empress Bian =

Empress Bian (卞皇后) may refer to the following empresses of the Cao Wei state:

- Empress Dowager Bian (159–230), Cao Cao's wife and Cao Pi's mother
- Empress Bian (Cao Mao's wife) (fl. 255), Cao Mao's wife
- Empress Bian (Cao Huan's wife) (fl. 263), Cao Huan's wife

== See also ==
- Queen Bian (fl. 338–409), queen of the Western Qin state
