= Empress Guo (Cao Rui's wife) =

Empress Dowager of Cao Wei (died 264)

Empress Guo 郭皇后

Empress dowager of Cao Wei
- Tenure: 22 January 239 – 8 February 264
- Predecessor: Empress Wende

Empress consort of Cao Wei
- Tenure: 16 January 239 – 22 January 239
- Predecessor: Empress Mingdao
- Successor: Empress Huai
- Born: Unknown
- Died: 8 February 264
- Spouse: Cao Rui
- Issue: Princess Yi of Pingyuan
Posthumous name
- Empress Mingyuan (明元皇后)
- Father: Guo Man
- Mother: Lady Du

Empress Guo (fl.220 – 8 February 264 (Note: According to Cao Huan's biography in Sanguozhi, Empress Dowager Guo died on the yimao day of the 12th month of the 4th year of the Jingyuan era of Cao Huan's reign. This corresponds to 8 Feb 264 in the proleptic Gregorian calendar.)), personal name unknown, formally known as Empress Mingyuan, was an empress of the state of Cao Wei during the Three Kingdoms period of China. She was married to Cao Rui, the second ruler of Wei; she was his third wife and second empress. The limited information available about her appears to portray her as an intelligent woman who fought hard to prevent her empire from falling into the hands of the Sima clan (Sima Yi and his sons Sima Shi and Sima Zhao) during the reigns of her adopted son Cao Fang and his cousin Cao Mao, but was unable to stem the tide.

It's said she was actually one of the last major resistances against the Sima family. Sima Yan, Sima Zhao's son, only established the Jin Dynasty two years after her death.

== Family background and marriage to Cao Rui ==
The future Empress Guo was from Xiping Commandery (西平郡; roughly present-day Xining, Qinghai). Her family was a powerful clan in the area. But during the reign of Cao Rui's father Cao Pi, at some point before 223, her clan was implicated in a rebellion; she, among others in her family, was confiscated by the Wei government in the aftermath. She became a concubine of Cao Rui after his ascension to the throne, and he greatly favoured her. Due to her favour with the Emperor, her uncle Guo Li (郭立) was made Cavalry Commandant and her kinsman Guo Zhi (郭芝) placed in charge of cadets.

In September 237, Consort Guo's increasing favor led to a fatal incident with Cao Rui's former favourite, Empress Mao. Cao Rui ordered a feast with his favoured ladies, and Consort Guo requested that Empress Mao be invited to join as well, but Cao Rui refused. Despite Cao Rui's orders of forbidding discussions about this banquet, Empress Mao the next day enquired if he had enjoyed himself at said banquet. Cao Rui killed a number of his attendants whom he suspected of leaking the news, and ordered Empress Mao to commit suicide.

Despite her favour, she was not created empress until 16 January 239 when it was clear Cao Rui was mortally ill and unable to get out of bed. Cao Rui, after some chaos, settled his plans for his eight-year-old heir and adopted son Cao Fang to be Emperor under a joint regency of kinsman Cao Shuang and long-serving minister Sima Yi. Guo was the first Wei empress of respectable background, but the Cao Wei policy of not having an empress with a power base was continued. She would be Dowager, but the Wei dynasty since Cao Pi had restricted the role of Dowagers in government and her relatives would not hold high office. She had symbolic authority but her practical power was a lot more limited than the dowagers of the Han dynasty. On 22 January, Cao Rui died.

== As empress dowager ==
On Cao Fang's ascension to the throne, Guo was made Empress Dowager and her family was honoured. Her deceased father Guo Man and her mother Du were given fiefdoms. Guo Zhi and Guo Li, along with Guo's brothers De and the able Jian, were now appointed to the guards. The four male relatives had control of the palace guard, and they were all given the rank of marquis. During her time as Empress Dowager, heads of government would claim to consult her on all major decisions while generals turning against the controllers of the court would claim her backing. Although she was an important symbol of legitimacy, she would have limited practical power.

=== Joint regency ===
Initially the two regents managed to work together but over time, splits emerged. Cao Shuang has traditionally been considered a corrupt and incompetent regent. His centralizing reforms and his choice of controversial officials like the philosophers He Yan and Wang Bi alienated members of the court with their libertine excesses. A failed campaign west against the rival state of Shu Han in 244 further damaged the regime's prestige. Though the Zhengshi period under Cao Shuang was known as a time of intellectual brilliance and his regime was seen as reformist, the attitudes of He Yan and others clashed with the interests and views of Sima Yi's supporters. In 247, Cao Shuang's supporters began to use omens to warn of the dangers of Sima Yi and Cao Shuang became the dominant figure in the government as he brought in his supporters while Sima Yi feigned illness to seemingly retire. How Empress Dowager Guo felt about either regent or the split is not clear but Cao Shuang is accused of moving Empress Dowager Guo to Yongning Palace in 247 to be separated from Cao Fang. However, some scholars such as Hu Sanxing (Note: While Hu opinioned that the Tang-era authors of the Book of Jin inherited the slanderous records of Jin officials with regards to Cao Shuang, he did not discuss why the authors of the Book of Jin would do so uncritically, given that the Tang dynasty did not derive its legitimacy from the Jin, while Emperor Taizong of Tang was famously critical of Sima Yi. One possibility was that Hu did not see the need for the discussion, deeming it self-explanatory that Tang officials would accept slander on Cao Shuang, just as how Emperor Taizong's brothers Li Jiancheng and Li Yuanji were slandered after the Xuanwu Gate Incident.) and Wang Maohong raised doubts, and argued that such events never occurred as Empress Dowager Guo had already relocated to Yongning Palace upon the accession of Cao Fang, and these events might have been added, not for the only time, by the officials of the Jin dynasty to defame Cao Shuang.

On 5 February 249, Cao Shuang took Cao Fang to visit the family tombs outside the capital and Sima Yi seized his chance. Claiming to have an edict in Empress Dowager Guo's name, he carried out a coup d'état. Cao Shuang surrendered but despite promises of safety, on 9 February, Cao Shuang's clan and many of his associates were slaughtered on charges of treason. After the infamously bloody purge, Sima Yi and his family took complete control of the government. In the aftermath, the first signs of resistance against the now very powerful controller were seen. Someone in the palace offered Sima Yi two tainted promotions, first to be Chancellor with comparisons to the Han dynasty's Huo Guang, on paper a flattering comparison given his reputation for loyalty but the Huo family coup and the way the usurper Wang Mang used Huo Guang to justify his own control hang in the air. Sima Yi refused, despite it being offered ten times. All nine distinctions were offered, an award only given to Wang Mang and Han controller Cao Cao. Again, Sima Yi refused, though he did keep some of the rewards. The author of the two sets of honours, hinting at Sima Yi being viewed as a usurper within the palace, is unknown. However, historians Carl Leban and Albert Dien suggest it might even have come from Empress Dowager Guo herself.

=== Deposition of Cao Fang ===
After Sima Yi died on 7 September 251, his son Sima Shi succeeded him and kept the government in as much control as his father did. In 254, possibly with the connivance of the Emperor, Cao Fang's father-in-law Zhang Ji, (Note: Empress Zhen died in August 251 and Lady Zhang was created empress in 252.) official Li Feng and others plotted to replace Sima Shi with the famed kinsman Xiahou Xuan. The first plot failed as Li Feng's son was denied permission to come to court (thus unable to bring his troops from Yu province). Then on 27 March, Sima Shi discovered a second plot, this time to assassinate him during a ceremony to promote a concubine of Cao Fang. Sima Shi purged those who had plotted, killed their families and Empress Zhang was dismissed, though it was unclear if Empress Dowager Guo had any knowledge of the plots. There is another plot, in the autumn, that is claimed to have direct involvement of the Emperor. Some of Cao Fang's associates had suggested that when Sima Shi's brother Sima Zhao was at the palace preparing to lead troops against an invasion from Shu Han general Jiang Wei, Sima Zhao should be killed, and his troops seized to be used to attack Sima Shi. But when the moment came, Cao Fang could not resolve to do it and news leaked out to Sima Shi. However, Pei Songzhi questions the tale as one of the people involved was already dead over the Li Feng plot while Carl Leban and Albert Dien view the account with scepticism. From that point on, any official who dared to be close to the emperor and the empress dowager was doing so at his peril.

Cao Fang's reign would not finish the year, either because of his role in the plots or simply because he was no longer credible as a willing Emperor to abdicate the throne to the Simas. On 17 October, he was deposed at the age of 23 (by East Asian reckoning). Sima Shi sent Guo Zhi to the palace to inform the imperial family that Cao Fang would abdicate. The Emperor and the Dowager were seated together and Cao Fang departed. Empress Dowager Guo was furious, but her kinsman accused Guo of failing to bring up "her son" Cao Fang properly and, less subtly, mentioned Sima Shi had the palace surrounded by troops in case of an incident. When she asked for an audience with Sima Shi, Guo Zhi rejected her request despite Sima Shi being a subject of the throne. Broken by the threat and realizing she couldn't stop the plan, the Empress Dowager summoned the seals of office needed for the abdication and Guo Zhi returned to a delighted Sima Shi. A weeping Sima Shi told officials this was the orders of the Empress Dowager and his loyalists (including Guo Zhi) produced a memorial accusing Cao Fang of laziness, violence, depravity, mistreatment of and even threatening the Dowager. Of the Dowager's behaviour, the officials claimed she had to force Empress Zhang upon Cao Fang, was neglected by Fang as she filially mourned her late mother to the point she struggled to eat or drink, executed some of Cao Fang's favourite ladies and made concerted personal efforts to get her charge to study. The officials played along and cited the example of the deposed Han Emperor Liu He to justify the change of the Emperor via such charges. An edict from Empress Dowager Guo confirmed the allegations though the Dowager's procliminations and orders at this time were either forced or Sima Shi may even have had them forged. When it came for Cao Fang to depart to his life of isolation and imprisonment as the Prince of Qi, she and the Emperor wept at his departure.

It was during the next phase of Sima Shi's plan that Empress Dowager Guo would display her wisdom and courage in a last-ditch attempt to preserve some possibility of preventing the Simas from taking complete control over Wei and at least buying the dynasty she was loyal to a bit of time. Sima Shi intended to make Cao Pi's brother Cao Ju (曹據), the Prince of Pengcheng, emperor and had even sent Minister Ren Yan to Cao Ju's fief to prepare for this change but he needed the Empress Dowager's seal of office and formal backing. She refused to hand over the seal; instead, she argued that since Cao Ju was the uncle of her husband Cao Rui, such a succession would leave Cao Rui effectively with no heir and that this was entirely inappropriate. Sima Shi was forced to agree with her, and she successfully pushed for Cao Mao (the Duke of Gaogui District), the son of Cao Rui's younger brother Cao Lin, emperor instead. Cao Mao, although only 13 years old, was known for his intelligence and Empress Dowager Guo might have believed that he might have had a chance of counteracting the Simas while his youth brought time. When Sima Shi again asked her for the imperial seal, she refused politely, under the reasoning that she had met Cao Mao before and wanted to personally hand him the seal.

In 255, declaring that they had received a secret edict from Empress Dowager Guo, experienced generals Guanqiu Jian and Wen Qin made a failed attempt to overthrow Sima Shi, by starting a rebellion from Shouchun (壽春; present-day Shou County, Anhui). Sima Shi (probably) defeated them but the exertion when recovering from surgery was fatal. There was no real evidence that Empress Dowager Guo was actually in communication with them, however.

=== Regicide and aftermath ===
In March 255, Cao Mao made a failed attempt to wrest power. When Sima Shi died while at Xuchang, Sima Zhao was at Xuchang as well. Cao Mao issued an edict ordering Sima Zhao to remain at Xuchang and that Sima Shi's assistant Fu Gu (傅嘏) return to the capital Luoyang with the main troops. However, Sima Zhao returned to Luoyang anyway against edict, and was able to maintain control of the government. When southern commander Zhuge Dan made a failed rebellion in 257, Sima Zhao insisted on both the emperor and the empress dowager accompanying him on the campaign against Zhuge Dan. Sima Zhao cited examples of past Emperors going to war and that Cao Mao would inspire the troops but, facing a lengthy (ten months as it would turn out) war, Sima Zhao was keeping both the youth and the Dowager away from the capital where they might help to cause trouble and under his control.

With Zhuge Dan's defeat, Sima Zhao's power grew, rising to Chancellor while Cao Mao won admirers as he came of age though he was open with his discontent towards his controller. There is no reference to the acts of Empress Dowager Guo herself during Cao Mao's reign including if she had any part in the plot following Sima Shi's death. On 2nd June 260, Cao Mao visited the Dowager to inform her of his intent as he tried to start a coup d'état himself with the imperial guards loyal to him, and after initial successes near the palace, was nevertheless killed in battle. Having committed regicide, Sima Zhao engaged in damage control: on the same day as Cao Mao's death, an edict from the Empress Dowager came out; either Empress Dowager Guo was forced to issue it or as historians Carl Leban and Albert Dien argue, Sima Zhao engaged in an "outrageous fabrication". In this fabrication, a story is told of how the Dowager feared for her life from the debauched and unfillal Cao Mao, that she had wanted to depose the Emperor but Sima Zhao had held her back until Cao Mao, after shooting at her and poisoning her failed, led forces to kill her. She demanded that he be buried as a commoner, allowing Sima Zhao to restore him to a proper burial as a king a few days later. "She" would also publicize Sima Zhao refusing honours that he had been offered just before Cao Mao's coup and, though she cleared Cheng Ji of treason, accepted Sima Zhao's request (as a woman unfit to understand these things) to have Cheng Ji executed for the regicide of Cao Mao.

Sima Zhao took action to strip Dowager Guo of even token authority while strengthening his own, changing the status of her pronouncements from orders to edicts and regulations to give his orders imperial authority while there was no Emperor. He then chose Cao Huan, the Duke of Changdao District, a grandson of Cao Cao, to be emperor. Even though Cao Rui's brothers still had issue while his selection raised the same concerns that Dowager Guo had raised about Cao Ju in 254, suggesting Sima Zhao didn't even bother to consult with the Dowager. There would still be a few more final acts to perform, an edict to have the court discuss Cao Huan's birthname Huang being too common a character (璜) to be made a name taboo which led to his name being changed to Huan (奐). On 27 June, she met with Cao Huan and he was enthroned.

== Death and legacy ==
She died in February 264 without being able to make any further impact against the power of the Simas. One of Sima Zhao's chief officers Zhong Hui would make one final claim to her authority, claiming he was acting on her orders as he launched a rebellion in March 264 following the fall of Shu Han. Sima Zhao's son Sima Yan eventually usurped the throne in February 266, almost exactly two years after her death, and established the Jin dynasty. She was buried on 13 April 264. The Sanguozhi by Chen Shou who served the Jin dynasty draws upon her legitimacy by claiming the Simas always checked with or informed her before taking any action and noted the revolts claiming her support. The historians Carl Leban and Albert Dien praise Empress Dowager Guo as loyal to the Cao house and worked to prevent the Sima usurpation, bravely managing to buy time despite facing Sima Shi alone.

=== In fiction ===
In the 14th-century novel Romance of the Three Kingdoms by Luo Guanzhong, Dowager Guo is introduced in chapter 105 as the novel sets out Cao Rui's wrongdoings. Described as clever and beautiful, she gains the Emperor's favour and urges him to invite Empress Mao to the secret banquets. When Cao Rui kills Empress Mao, Guo is promoted straight to Empress. As Dowager, she is scared when Sima Yi declares Cao Shuang a traitor and though alarmed, can only act under Sima Yi's direction. She makes no opposition to deposing Cao Fang; she does suggest Cao Mao as replacement, with Sima Fu's support decisive. The anti-Sima figures of history who claimed support from the Dowager make such claims in the novel as well and she is taken on the campaign against Zhuge Dan as in history. Cao Mao does inform her of his attempted coup but Guo plays no political role in what follows.

== See also ==
- Cao Wei family trees#Cao Rui
- Lists of people of the Three Kingdoms

== Notes ==
Chinese royalty
Preceded by Empress Mao	Empress of Cao Wei; 238–239	Succeeded by Empress Zhen
