= Zhang Ji =

Zhang Ji may refer to:

- Zhang Ji (Han dynasty) (張濟) (died 196), official under the warlord Dong Zhuo
- Zhang Zhongjing (150–219), formal name Zhang Ji (張機), Han dynasty physician
- Zhang Ji (Derong) (張既) (died 223), general of Cao Wei of the Three Kingdoms period
  - Zhang Ji (Jingzhong) (张缉), son of Zhang Derong
- Zhang Ji (poet from Hubei) (張繼) (fl. 715–779), Tang dynasty poet from Hubei
- Zhang Ji (poet from Jiangnan) (張籍) (c. 766–830), Tang dynasty poet from Jiangnan
- Zhang Ji (Republic of China) (張繼) (1882–1947), Kuomintang politician
- Zhang Ji (handballer) (张骥) (born 1978), Chinese handball player
- Zhang Ji (politician, born 1963), a Chinese politician and senior official of the Chinese Communist Party.
