= Empress Wang (Cao Fang) =

Empress of Cao Wei in 254

Empress Wang 王皇后

Empress consort of Cao Wei
- Tenure: c.May 254 – October 254
- Predecessor: Empress Zhang
- Successor: Empress Bian
- Born: Unknown
- Died: Unknown
- Spouse: Cao Fang
- Father: Wang Kui (王夔)

Empress Wang (fl.250 – 254), personal name unknown, was an empress of Cao Wei during the Three Kingdoms period of China. She was the third wife of Cao Fang, the third emperor of Cao Wei.

Very little is known about her, other than that she was the daughter of Wang Kui (王夔), the director of imperial transportation. She was created empress in May or June 254, after Cao Fang's second wife Empress Zhang was deposed in light of false accusations of treason levied against her father Zhang Ji (張緝) by the regent Sima Shi. It is not known whether Empress Wang was previously an imperial consort.

Later in 254, Cao Fang considered a coup against Sima Shi, and while he ultimately did not carry out the plan, the news leaked. Sima Shi then deposed him and demoted him to the title of "Prince of Qi" (which he held during his father Cao Rui's reign) in October 254. What happened to Empress Wang is not known, although presumably she was allowed to have the title of the Princess of Qi. Nothing further is said about her in the official histories.

== See also ==
- Cao Wei family trees#Cao Fang
- Lists of people of the Three Kingdoms

Chinese royalty
Preceded by Empress Zhang	Empress of Cao Wei; 254	Succeeded by Empress Bian
