= Empress Kezuhun =

Empress Kezuhun (可足渾皇后) may refer to the following Xianbei empresses of the Former Yan state:

- Empress Dowager Kezuhun (fl. 353–369), Murong Jun's wife, also empress dowager during her son Murong Wei's reign
- Empress Kezuhun (Murong Wei's wife) (fl. 369), Murong Wei's wife
