= Empress Zhen (Cao Fang) =

Empress of Cao Wei (died 251)

Empress Zhen 甄皇后

Empress consort of Cao Wei
- Tenure: 29 May 243 – 22 August 251
- Predecessor: Empress Mingyuan
- Successor: Empress Zhang
- Born: Unknown
- Died: 22 August 251 (Note: Cao Fang's biography in the Sanguozhi recorded that Empress Zhen died on the renxu day of the 7th month of the 3rd year of the Jiaping era of Cao Fang's reign. This date corresponds to 22 August 251 in the Gregorian calendar.)
- Spouse: Cao Fang
Posthumous name
- Empress Huai (懷皇后)

Empress Zhen (died 22 August 251), personal name unknown, formally known as Empress Huai (懷皇后), was an empress of the state of Cao Wei during the Three Kingdoms period of China. She was the first wife of Cao Fang, the third emperor of Cao Wei.

Not much is known about her, other than that her grandfather, Zhen Yan (甄儼), was a brother of Lady Zhen, the mother of Cao Rui, the second emperor of Wei. She was made empress in May 243. While her age at the time was unknown, Cao Fang was about 11. She died in August 251 and was buried on 24 September (Note: yiwei day of the 8th month of the 3rd year of the Jiaping era) with honours befitting an empress. (Note: The reason her posthumous name was one character rather than two was because her husband was eventually deposed in 254, and therefore never given a posthumous name; the customs at the time generally dictated that the empress' posthumous name share one character with their husbands'.)

== See also ==
- Cao Wei family trees#Cao Fang
- Lists of people of the Three Kingdoms

== Notes ==
Chinese royalty
| Preceded by Empress Guo | Empress of Cao Wei; 243–251 | Succeeded by Empress Zhang |
