= Queen Liang =

Western Qin Chinese queen

Queen Liang (Chinese: 梁王后; personal name unknown) was a queen of the Western Qin dynasty of China. Her husband was the final king, Qifu Mumo.

Very little is known about Queen Liang. Qifu Mumo created her queen in 429, after he had succeeded his father Qifu Chipan (King Wenzhao) in 428. It is not known whether his son Qifu Wanzai (乞伏萬載), whom he created crown prince in 429 as well, was her son. It is not known what happened to her when Qifu Mumo was captured and executed by the Xia emperor Helian Ding in 431, ending Western Qin, although Helian Ding executed a large number of Western Qin nobles and officials, so it was likely she was executed as well.

Chinese royalty
Preceded by Queen Tufa	Queen of Western Qin; 429–431?	Succeeded by None (dynasty destroyed)
