= Empress Bian (Cao Huan's wife) =

Empress of Cao Wei from 263 to 266

Empress Bian 卞皇后

Empress consort of Cao Wei
- Tenure: 28 November 263 – 4 February 266
- Predecessor: Empress Bian
- Born: Unknown
- Died: Unknown
- Spouse: Cao Huan
- Father: Bian Lin

Empress Bian, personal name unknown, was an empress of Cao Wei during the Three Kingdoms period of China. She was married to Cao Huan (Emperor Yuan), the fifth and last emperor of Cao Wei. She was a daughter of Bian Lin (卞霖) and a granddaughter of Bian Bing (卞秉), a brother of Lady Bian (the mother of Cao Pi, the first Wei emperor).

Cao Huan married Empress Bian in November 263, when he was 17. Her age is not known. There was no further records of her activities, as her husband was himself under the tight control of the regent Sima Zhao. There is also no record of her activities after her husband abdicated in favour of Sima Zhao's son Sima Yan, ending the Cao Wei state and establishing the Jin dynasty, although presumably, since her husband was created the Prince of Chenliu, that she became the Princess of Chenliu. She also was presumably granted a posthumous imperial title after her death (as her husband was), but there is no record of what that posthumous name was.

== See also ==
- Cao Wei family trees#Lady Huan
- Lists of people of the Three Kingdoms

Chinese royalty
Preceded by Empress Bian (Cao Mao's wife)	Empress of Cao Wei; 263–266	Succeeded by none (dynasty destroyed)
Preceded by Empress Bian (Cao Mao's wife)	Empress of China (Northern/Central); 263–266	Succeeded by Empress Yang Yan of Jin
Preceded by Empress Zhang (later) of Shu Han	Empress of China (Southwestern); 263–266	Succeeded by Empress Yang Yan of Jin
