= Empress Zhang (Cao Fang) =

Empress of Cao Wei from 252 to 254

Empress Zhang 張皇后

Empress consort of Cao Wei
- Tenure: c.March 252 – c.April 254
- Predecessor: Empress Huai
- Successor: Empress Wang
- Born: Unknown
- Died: Unknown
- Spouse: Cao Fang
- Father: Zhang Ji

Empress Zhang (fl.250 – 254), personal name unknown, was an empress of Cao Wei during the Three Kingdoms period of China. She was the second wife of Cao Fang, the third emperor of Cao Wei.

Not much is known about her, other than her grandfather Zhang Ji (張既; courtesy name Derong) was a governor of Liang Province (covering roughly present-day Gansu) and that her father Zhang Ji (張緝; courtesy name Jingzhong) was a commandery administrator. She was created empress in c.March 252; at that time, her grandfather was already deceased, while her father was promoted to senior minister. While her age was unknown, Cao Fang was about 20.

In March 254, the regent Sima Shi killed Cao Fang's confidant, the official Li Feng (a friend of Zhang Ji). He then falsely accused Li Feng, Zhang Ji and their friend Xiahou Xuan of treason, and had all of them and their clans executed. One month later, Cao Fang was forced to depose Empress Zhang. It is not known what her fate was, although it would appear likely that she was put under house arrest for the rest of her life but not executed along with the rest of her family.

== See also ==
- Cao Wei family trees#Cao Fang
- Lists of people of the Three Kingdoms

Chinese royalty
Preceded by Empress Zhen	Empress of Cao Wei; 252–254	Succeeded by Empress Wang
