= Qifu Mumo =

Qifu Mumo 乞伏暮末
- Prince of Western Qin

Ruler of Western Qin
- Reign: 428–431
- Predecessor: Qifu Chipan
- Died: 431
Full name
- Family name: Qǐfú (乞伏); Given name: Mùmò (暮末)
Era name and dates
- Yǒnghóng (永弘): 428–431
Regnal name
- Prince of Qin (秦王)
- House: Qifu
- Dynasty: Western Qin

Qifu Mumo (Chinese: 乞伏暮末; died 431), courtesy name Anshiba (安石跋), was the last prince of the Xianbei-led Western Qin dynasty of China. When he succeeded his father Qifu Chipan (Prince Wenzhao) in 428, the Western Qin was already in a state of decline, under incessant attack by the Northern Liang, Hu Xia, Tuyuhun, and Chouchi, but under Qifu Mumo, who had a violent temper, the Western Qin declined further, and in 431 the Hu Xia emperor Helian Ding, his own state nearing destruction, captured and executed Qifu Mumo, ending the Western Qin dynasty.

== During Qifu Chipan's reign ==
It is not known when Qifu Mumo was born, nor is the name of his mother known—other than that she was neither his father Qifu Chipan's princess Princess Tufa, nor her sister Consort Tufa. The first historical reference to him was in 420, when Qifu Chipan created him crown prince—and by that time, he was already a major general, for the historical reference mentioned that he "remained" a general. In 424, his father sent him and his uncle Qifu Muyigan (乞伏木奕干) to attack Northern Liang, and they were victorious. A campaign that Qifu Mumo carried out with his father against Northern Liang in 426 would be far more disastrous, however, as the Northern Liang prince Juqu Mengxun not only repelled their attacks but persuaded the Xia emperor Helian Chang to attack Western Qin's capital Fuhan (枹罕, in modern Linxia, Gansu). Helian Chang, in response, sent his general Hulu Gu (呼盧古) to attack Wanchuan (苑川, in modern Baiyin, Gansu) and Wei Fa (韋伐) to attack Nan'an (南安, in modern Dingxi, Gansu), and while Western Qin was able to hold Wanchuan, Nan'an fell, at great loss. In winter 426, Xia forces commanded by Hulu and Wei attacked Fuhan, forcing Qifu Gangui to move the capital to Dinglian (定連, also in Linxia), and Hulu and Wei then captured another important Western Qin city, Xiping (西平, in modern Xining, Qinghai), and while they then withdrew, Western Qin had been dealt a major blow.

In 428, Qifu Chipan died, and Qifu Mumo succeeded him.

== Reign ==
At the time Qifu Mumo took the throne, Western Qin was in severe decline, but Qifu Mumo, instead of trying to allow his people to recover, was cruel with his punishments and harsh in his judgment, further injuring the state's ability to recover. For example, immediately after he took the throne, he, hearing that his uncle Qifu Qiannian (乞伏千年) had been a drunkard and ignoring his duties, sent messengers to severely rebuke Qifu Qiannian, but the rebukes were such that instead of causing Qifu Qiannian to change his ways, Qifu Qiannian became so fearful that he fled to Northern Liang.

Qifu Mumo first had to face a major attack that Juqu Mengxun launched against Western Qin in light of his father's death. As his father had instructed before death, Qifu Mumo sent Juqu Chengdu (沮渠成都), a Northern Liang general whom Qifu Chipan captured in 422, whom Juqu Mengxun respected, back to Northern Liang, and the states entered into a peace agreement. However, just several months later the peace appeared to be over, for Juqu Mengxun resumed his attacks on Western Qin. In spring 429, Juqu Mengxun captured Xiping.

Also in spring 429, Qifu Mumo created his wife Lady Liang princess, and his son Qifu Wanzai (乞伏萬載) crown prince.

Another incident in 429 showed Qifu Mumo's harshness. His mother had, during Qifu Chipan's reign, been accidentally injured by slingshots fired by Qifu Chipan's official Xin Jin (辛進), while Xin was attending Qifu Chipan on a hunt. The injury disfigured her face. In 429, Qifu Mumo asked his mother how she got injured, and she told him. In anger, Qifu Mumo not only executed Xin but executed 27 other individuals related to Xin.

In summer 429, Juqu Mengxun launched another major attack on Western Qin, and Qifu Mumo left his uncle Qifu Yuanji (乞伏元基) in control of Fuhan while temporarily withdrawing himself to Dinglian. He then also had to contend with rebellions by his generals Zhai Chengbo (翟承伯) and Mozhe Yojuan (莫者幼眷), but when Juqu Mengxun's heir apparent Juqu Xingguo attacked Dinglian, Qifu Mumo defeated and captured him. He then also fought off another joint attack by Northern Liang and its ally Tuyuhun's general Murong Muliyan (慕容慕利延). Juqu Mengxun sent a large amount of grain to Qifu Mumo, requesting to ransom Juqu Xingguo, but Qifu Mumo refused. Juqu Mengxun then created Juqu Xingguo's brother Juqu Puti (沮渠菩提) heir apparent instead, while Qifu Mumo made Juqu Xingguo an official and married his sister Princess Pingchang to Juqu Xingguo.

For some time, Qifu Mumo's brother Qifu Keshuluo (乞伏軻殊羅) had been having an affair with Qifu Chipan's concubine Consort Tufa. After Qifu Mumo heard rumors, he secured the palace, and Qifu Keshuluo, in fear that the affair had been discovered, plotted with their uncle Qifu Shiyin (乞伏什寅) to assassinate Qifu Mumo, and then to take Juqu Xingguo and flee to Northern Liang. They therefore had Consort Tufa try to steal Qifu Mumo's bedchamber keys, but the wrong keys were stolen, and the plot was exposed. Qifu Mumo executed Qifu Keshuluo's associates but spared Qifu Keshuluo, but also arrested Qifu Shiyin and whipped him. Qifu Shiyin, in anger, stated, "I owe you a life, but do not owe you a whipping." In anger, Qifu Mumo cut Qifu Shiyin's abdomen open and threw his body into a river. In 430, having heard that two other uncles, Qifu Baiyang (乞伏白養) and Qifu Qulie (乞伏去列) were complaining about Qifu Shiyin's death, he executed them as well.

At this time, Western Qin not only had to face Northern Liang attacks, but had suffered a major earthquake in late 429 and a major drought for most of 430 as well. Most of Qifu Mumo's people fled. He felt that his state could no longer stand. He sent his officials Wang Kai (王愷) and Wuna Tian (烏訥闐) to submit to Northern Wei, requesting Northern Wei troops to escort him to Northern Wei territory. Emperor Taiwu of Northern Wei was pleased, and promised that after he can destroy Xia, he would bestow Xia's Pingliang (平涼) and Anding (安定) Commanderies (collectively roughly modern Pingliang, Gansu) as Qifu Mumo's domain. Qifu Mumo therefore destroyed his own royal treasury and set Fuhan ablaze, heading east with the only 15,000 households that remained under him, to try to join Northern Wei troops at Shanggui (上邽, in modern Tianshui, Gansu), but the Xia emperor Helian Ding (Helian Chang's brother and successor), upon hearing this, engaged him and stopped his advances, and he was forced to take up defensive position at Nan'an. By this point, Nan'an was all he could hold; all of his old territory in the west had been seized by Tuyuhun.

In winter 430, Northern Wei troops, commanded by Kuruguan Jie (庫傉官結), finally arrived at Nan'an, to escort Qifu Mumo to Northern Wei territory. However, Qifu Mumo, persuaded by his general Qifu Jipi (乞伏吉毗) that the situation was still maintainable and that the should not give up his state easily, refused to follow Kuruguan, who then returned to Northern Wei territory. He then had to immediately face a Qiang rebellion led by Jiao Liang (焦亮), who attacked Nan'an. Qifu Mumo was able to persuade Yang Nandang (楊難當), the ruler of Chouchi, to come to his aid, and their joint forces defeated Jiao Liang, who was then killed by his uncle Jiao Yi (焦遺).

In spring 431, with his own territories nearly all taken by Northern Wei, Helian Ding, after defeating the troops that Yang sent to aid Western Qin, had his uncle Helian Weifa (赫連韋伐) put Nan'an under siege. Even Qifu Mumo's closest associates surrendered. Qifu Mumo, with no way to go, exited the city and surrendered to Helian Weifa. Helian Weifa delivered Qifu Mumo and Juqu Xingguo to Shanggui, where Helian Ding was at the time. Jiao Yi and his son Jiao Kai (焦楷) tried to put together a resistance to try to revive Western Qin, but Jiao Yi then died of illness, and Jiao Kai fled to Northern Liang. In summer 431, Helian Ding executed Qifu Mumo and 500 members of his clan. Western Qin was at its end.

== Personal information ==
- Father
  - Qifu Chipan (Prince Wenzhao)
- Wife
  - Queen Liang (created 429)
- Children
  - Qifu Wanzai (乞伏萬載), the Crown Prince (created 429)

(Western) Qin Houzhu House of Qifu Died: 431
Chinese royalty
Preceded by Qifu Chipan	Prince of Western Qin; 428–431	Extinct
Titles in pretence
Preceded by Qifu Chipan	— TITULAR — Emperor of China; 428–431; Reason for succession failure: Annexed by Xia (Sixteen Kingdoms)	Succeeded by Helian Ding
