= Li Feng (Cao Wei) =

Official of the state of Cao Wei (died 254)

- 李豐

Prefect of the Palace Writers (中書令)
- In office 251 – 254
- Monarch: Cao Fang

Supervisor of the Masters of Writing (尚書僕射)
- In office c. 240s – 251
- Monarch: Cao Fang

Palace Attendant
- In office c. 240s – 251
- Monarch: Cao Fang

Personal details
- Born: 200s Dali County, Shaanxi
- Died: 27 March 254 Luoyang, Henan
- Relations: Li Yi (brother); Li Wei (brother)
- Children: Li Tao; Li Wan
- Parent: Li Yi (father)
- Occupation: Politician
- Courtesy name: Anguo (安國)

Li Feng (200s - 27 March 254), courtesy name Anguo, was a Chinese politician of the state of Cao Wei during the Three Kingdoms period of China. He was a trusted official of the third Wei emperor Cao Fang, and did not follow the regent Sima Shi's wishes.

In 254, in company with Xiahou Xuan and Zhang Ji (張緝; son of Zhang Derong), he plotted to kill Sima Shi. However, Sima Shi sensed their scheme and summoned Li Feng to meet him in the palace, where he interrogated Li Feng and killed him. He was then accused of treason and his family members were executed as well.

== Family ==
Li Feng's father, Li Yi (李義), previously served as Minister of the Guards (衛尉) in the Cao Wei state.

Li Feng's first son, Li Tao (李韜), married Grand Princess of Qi (齊長公主), a daughter of the second Wei emperor Cao Rui. Li Feng's daughter, Li Wan (李婉), (Note: Her name was not recorded in official histories, but a Fu Ren Ji annotation in vol.19 of Shishuo Xinyu gave her name as "Wan".) married Jia Chong but was sentenced to exile after her father's downfall. Li Wan's daughter Jia Bao later married Sima You, a son of Sima Zhao and Wang Yuanji; one of their sons was Sima Jiong, one of the eponymous princes in the War of the Eight Princes.

== See also ==
- Lists of people of the Three Kingdoms
