= Zhang Ji (Derong) =

Chinese Eastern Han and Cao Wei official and general (died 223)

- 張既

Inspector of Liang Province (涼州刺史)
- In office ? – 223
- Monarch: Cao Pi

Inspector of Yong Province (雍州刺史)
- In office 213 – 220
- Monarch: Emperor Xian of Han
- Chancellor: Cao Cao

Intendant of the Capital (京兆尹)
- In office 211 – 213
- Monarch: Emperor Xian of Han
- Chancellor: Cao Cao

Personal details
- Born: Unknown (Note: The chronology of Zhang Ji's biography in the Sanguozhi implied that he was older than 16 (by East Asian reckoning) when Cao Cao, as Minister of Works (196-208), tried to recruit Zhang without success. The next event recorded in Zhang's biography which can be dated was Yuan Shang defending against Cao Cao at Liyang in 202-203. Thus, Zhang's birth year should be 181 or before.) Gaoling District, Xi'an, Shaanxi
- Died: 223 (Note: Zhang Ji's biography in the Sanguozhi recorded that he died in the 4th year of the Huangchu era (220-226) in Cao Pi's reign.)
- Children: Zhang Ji (Jingzhong); Zhang Wenggui
- Occupation: Official
- Courtesy name: Derong (德容)
- Posthumous name: Marquis Su (肅侯)
- Peerage: Marquis of Xi District (西鄉侯)

Zhang Ji (died 223), courtesy name Derong, was an official who lived during the late Eastern Han dynasty and early Three Kingdoms period of China. In 208, (Note: There are conflicting records on when Ma Teng was made Minister of the Guards; the Dianlve recorded a date of 210, while Zhang Ji's biography in Sanguozhi recorded that Cao Cao sent Zhang to persuade Ma Teng before the Jing expedition, which took place in 208. In his Zizhi Tongjian Kaoyi, Sima Guang agreed with the record found in Zhang Ji's biography in Sanguozhi, and opinioned that the Dianlve erroneously recorded the year as the 15th year of the Jian'an era instead of the 13th (盖“三”字误为“五”耳。).) Cao Cao wanted to conquer Jing, but feared Ma Teng's influence in Guanzhong. He summoned Ma Teng to Ye city with most of his family and wanted them to disband their personal troops. Cao Cao sent Zhang Ji to persuade Ma Teng. As Ma Teng was still hesitant about this, Zhang Ji ordered the counties to prepare supplies for his arrival and had officials of high position sent to welcome him. Ma Teng had no choice but to go east. During the Battle of Tong Pass, Zhang Ji, Xiahou Yuan and others defended the city of Chang'an from attacks by Ma Teng's son Ma Chao and his allies. From 213 to 220, Zhang Ji served as the Inspector of Yong Province. In 220, after the Han dynasty ended and the Three Kingdoms period started, Zhang Ji served under the state of Cao Wei as the Inspector of Liang Province. In 221, he quelled a Lushuihu rebellion in the Hexi Corridor.

He earned some merit for his administration during this time. His son, Zhang Ji (张缉, courtesy name Jingzhong (敬仲)), also served as an official in the Cao Wei state, and was the father of Cao Fang's Empress Zhang.

== See also ==
- Lists of people of the Three Kingdoms
