= Empress Bian (Cao Mao's wife) =

Empress of Cao Wei from 255 to 260

Empress Bian 卞皇后

Empress consort of Cao Wei
- Tenure: April or May 255 – June 260
- Predecessor: Empress Wang
- Successor: Empress Bian
- Spouse: Cao Mao
- Father: Bian Long

Empress Bian (fl.250 – 260), personal name unknown, was an empress of Cao Wei during the Three Kingdoms period of China. She was married to Cao Mao, the fourth emperor of Cao Wei. Her father Bian Long (卞隆) was a grandson of Bian Bing (卞秉), a brother-in-law of Cao Mao's great-grandfather Cao Cao. The former Empress Dowager Bian was her great-great-aunt.

Cao Mao married Empress Bian in 255, when he was 14. Her age was not known. There was no further records of her activities, as her husband was himself under the tight control of the regents Sima Shi and Sima Zhao. It is also not known what happened to her after Cao Mao made a failed coup attempt against Sima Zhao in June 260 and was killed in the attempt.

== See also ==
- Cao Wei family trees#Ladies Pan, Zhu, and Qiu
- Lists of people of the Three Kingdoms

Chinese royalty
Preceded by Empress Wang	Empress of Cao Wei; 255–260	Succeeded by Empress Bian (Cao Huan's wife)
