= Zhang Ji (Jingzhong) =

Cao Wei official and father-in-law of emperor Cao Fang (died 254)

Zhang Ji (张缉; 210s? - 27 March 254), courtesy name Jingzhong (敬仲), was an official of the state of Cao Wei during the Three Kingdoms period of China. He was best known for his involvement in a plot in 254 to kill Sima Shi, who was then regent of Cao Wei. The plot was foiled and Zhang was executed, along with many members of his clan.

== Background ==
Zhang Ji was a son of Zhang Derong, an official who served under Cao Cao and Cao Pi. Zhang Ji's daughter later became Cao Fang's empress in c.March 252. Although technically a consort kin, historical records did not indicate any benefits Zhang derived from the position, probably because the Sima clan had held great power ever the Incident at the Gaoping Tombs in February 249.

== Life ==
Zhang Ji once served as Administrator of Dongguan during the reign of Cao Rui.

On 27 March 254, the regent Sima Shi killed Cao Fang's confidant, the official Li Feng (a friend of Zhang Ji). He then accused Li Feng, Zhang Ji and their friend Xiahou Xuan of treason, and had all of them and their clans executed. One month later, Cao Fang was forced to depose Empress Zhang.

== Anecdote ==
Zhang Ji once mentioned to Sima Shi that although Zhuge Ke was successful in his border wars against Cao Wei, he was about to be executed. When Sima Shi asked for the reason, Zhang Ji replied, "(Zhuge's) prestige has overwhelmed his master and his merits has enveloped an entire nation; how can he not die?" Sure enough, after Zhuge Ke returned from Hefei in defeat, he was killed in a coup d'état. After Sima Shi received news of Zhuge's death, he said to those around him, "Recently, Zhang Jingzhong was discussing Ke with me; he thought that Ke would be killed. Today, it has been proven so. Jingzhong's intelligence is superior to Ke's."
