= 240s =

Decade

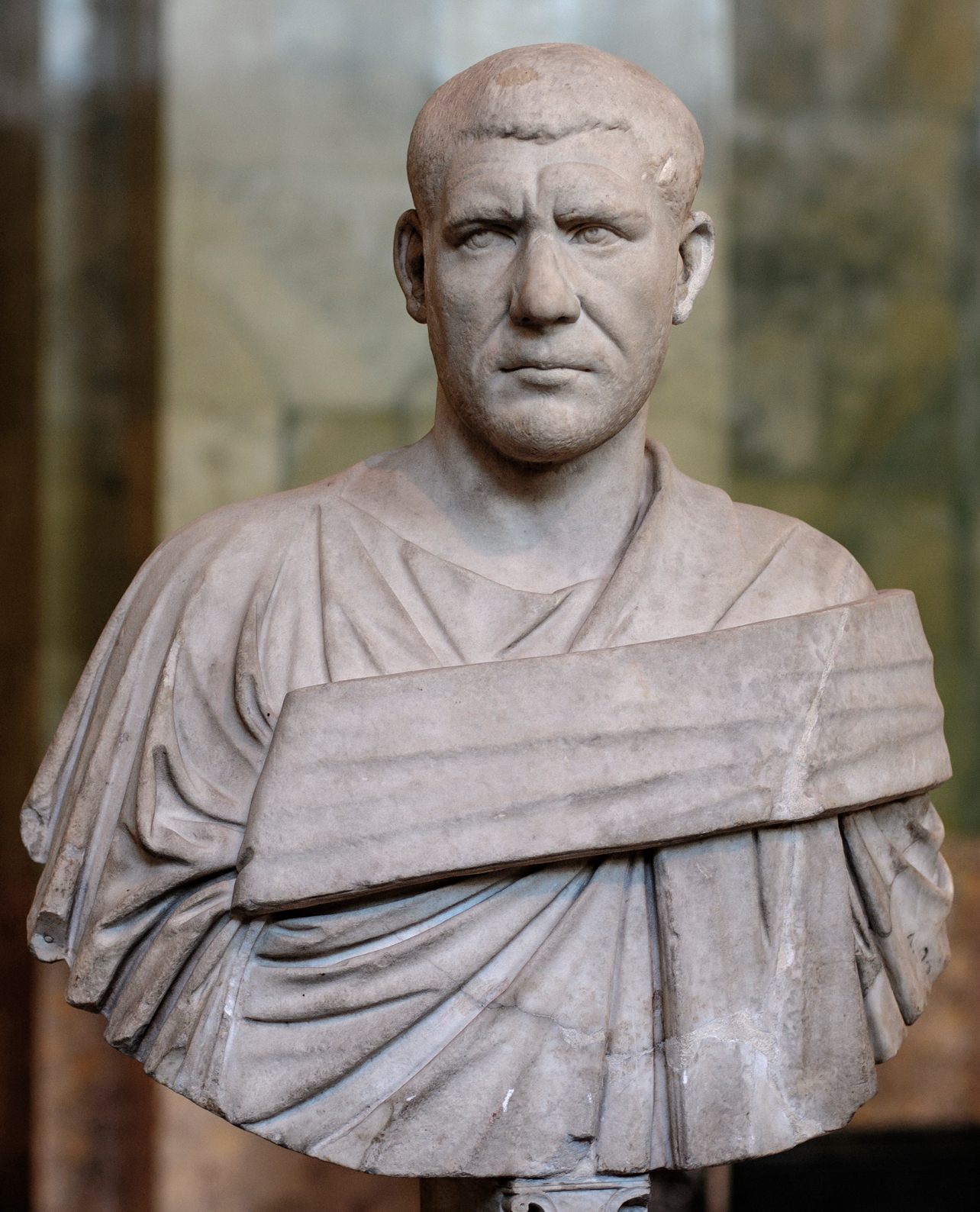
Philip the Arab ruled the Roman Empire from 244 to 249 in the middle of the Crisis of the Third Century. During his reign, Rome celebrated the 1000th anniversary of the supposed founding of Rome with the ludi saeculares.

The 240s decade ran from January 1, 240, to December 31, 249.

== Events ==
=== 240 ===
==== By place ====
====== Roman Empire ======
- The Roman Empire is threatened on several fronts at the same time. Africa revolts and tribes in northwest Germania, under the name of the Franks, are raiding the Rhine frontier.

====== Persia ======
- April 12 – Prince Shapur I becomes co-ruler of the Sasanian Empire with his father King Ardashir I.
- Siege of Hatra: The Sasanians besiege the capital of the Kingdom of Hatra ruled by Sanatruq II.

====== India ======
- Maharaja Sri-Gupta becomes ruler of the Gupta Empire (approximate date).

==== By topic ====
====== Religion ======
- Mani, a young mystic of Ctesiphon, proclaims himself a prophet at the court of Ardashir I. He preaches his doctrine, Manichaeism, throughout the Sassanid Empire.

=== 241 ===
==== By place ====
====== Roman Empire ======
- Winter – Emperor Gordian III reaches Antioch and, with his army, prepares an offensive against the Sassanids.
- Gaius Furius Sabinius Aquila Timesitheus becomes praetorian prefect and de facto ruler of the Roman Empire.

====== Persia ======
- Prince Shapur I succeeds his father Ardashir I as ruler of the Sassanid Empire. He begins his expansion in India.
- Shapur I annexes parts of the Kushan Empire. The ancient city of Bagram (modern Afghanistan) is abandoned.
- Fall of Hatra: Shapur I captures Hatra, the capital of the Kingdom of Hatra. The city is destroyed by the Sassanids.

====== Europe ======
- November 1 – The Battle of Samhain is fought in Ireland (approximate date).

==== By topic ====
====== Religion ======
- The Dura-Europos church is converted from a house in Syria (approximate date).

=== 242 ===
==== By place ====
====== Roman Empire ======
- Emperor Gordian III begins a campaign against King Shapur I, and leads victories at Antioch, Carrhae, Nisibis, and Resaina.
- Gordian III evacuates the Cimmerian cities in the Bosphorus (Crimea), as the territory is now controlled by the Goths.

====== Persia ======
- Shapur I makes a pre-emptive attack on Antioch to drive out the Romans. Gordian's father-in-law, Timesitheus, leads a Roman army to defeat the Sassanids at Carrhae and Nisibis.
- King Ardashir I, founder of the Sassanid Empire, dies after a 30-year reign. He is succeeded by his son and co-ruler Shapur I.

==== By topic ====
====== Religion ======
- Patriarch Titus succeeds Eugenius I as Patriarch of Constantinople (until 272).

=== 243 ===
==== By place ====
====== Roman Empire ======
- Battle of Resaena: A Roman army under Timesitheus defeats the Sassanids at Resaena (modern Syria); King Shapur I is forced to flee to the Euphrates.
- Timesitheus becomes ill and dies under suspicious circumstances. Shapur I retreats to the Sassanid Empire, giving up all the territories he has conquered.
- Emperor Gordian III appoints Philip the Arab as his new praetorian prefect (after the death of Timesitheus) and proceeds with his campaign in Mesopotamia.
- Cohors I Ubiorum, the garrison at Capidava in Scythia Minor, is replaced by Cohors I Germanorum Civium Romanorum, until the end of the 3rd century AD.

====== Asia ======
- Fan Chan of Funan sends a tribute mission to China (approximate date).

=== 244 ===
==== By place ====
====== Roman Empire ======
- Around February 11 – Battle of Misiche: King Shapur I and his Iranian army defeats the Roman army.
- February 11 – Emperor Gordian III is murdered by mutinous soldiers in Zaitha (Mesopotamia). A mound is raised at Carchemish in his memory.
- Philip the Arab (Marcus Julius Philippus) declares himself co-emperor, and makes a controversial peace with the Sassanian Empire, withdrawing from their territory and giving Shapur 500,000 gold pieces. The Sassanians occupy Armenia.
- Philip the Arab is recognized by the Roman Senate as the new Roman Emperor with the honorific Augustus. He nominates his son Philippus, age 6, with the title of Caesar and makes him heir to the throne; gives his brother Priscus supreme power (rector Orientis) in the Eastern provinces; and begins construction of the city of Shahba (Syria) in the province of his birth.
- The vassal Upper Mesopotamian kingdom of Osroene is absorbed into the Roman Empire, its last ruler being Abgar (XI) Farhat Bar Ma’nu.

====== Asia ======
- Battle of Xingshi: Shu Han defeats the Chinese state of Cao Wei.

====== Korea ======
- The Goguryeo–Wei War is fought between the Korean kingdom Goguryeo and the Chinese state Cao Wei.

==== By topic ====
====== Art and Science ======
- Plotinus, Greek philosopher, escapes the bloodshed that accompanies the murder of Gordianus III and makes his way to Antioch. Back in Rome he founds his Neoplatonist school and attracts disciples like Porphyry, Castricius Firmus and Eustochius of Alexandria.
- 244–249 – Bust of Philip the Arab (in Braccio Nuovo, Vatican Museums, Rome).

====== Commerce ======
- The silver content of the Roman denarius falls to 0.5 percent under emperor Philippus I, down from 28 percent under Gordian III.

====== Religion ======
- 244–245 – Last phase of construction of the house-style Dura-Europos synagogue in Syria, one of the oldest to survive (wall-paintings in the National Museum of Damascus, Syria).

=== 245 ===
==== By place ====
====== Roman Empire ======
- Emperor Philip the Arab entrusts Trajan Decius with an important command on the Danube.
- In Britain, many thousands of acres of modern-day Lincolnshire are inundated by a great flood.
- The philosopher Plotinus goes to live in Rome.

====== Asia ======
- Lady Triệu, a Vietnamese warrior, begins her 3-year resistance against the invading Chinese.

=== 246 ===
==== By place ====
====== Roman Empire ======
- Emperor Philip the Arab fights the Germans along the Danube River.
- The first of two Councils of Arabia in the Roman Christian Church is held in Bostra, Arabia Petraea.

====== Korea ======
- Baekje Kingdom under King Goi of Baekje attacks the Chinese commandery of Daifang.

=== 247 ===
==== By place ====
====== Roman Empire ======
- Rome becomes 1,000 years old. The 1,000th anniversary is commemorated with the Ludi Saeculares festivals, celebrated throughout the Roman Empire.
- Marcus Julius Philippus Augustus and his 10-year-old son Marcus Julius Philippus Caesar become Roman Consuls.
- The Goths appear on the lower Danube frontier; they invade Ukraine and Romania.
- Emperor Philip the Arab marks the millennium of Rome by holding the Ludi Saeculares.
- The last of the two Councils of Arabia in the Roman Christian Church is held in Bostra, Arabia Petraea.

====== Asia ======
- Himiko of Yamataikoku, in Japan, begins a war against King Himikoku of Kunukoku.
- Cheomhae becomes king of the Korean kingdom of Silla.

=== 248 ===
==== By place ====
====== Roman Empire ======
- The revolts of Pacatianus in Moesia and Iotapianus in Syria are put down by Senator Trajan Decius, by order of Emperor Philip the Arab.
- The Roman Empire continues the celebration of the 1,000th anniversary of Rome, with the ludi saeculares, organized by Philip the Arab.

====== Asia ======
- Jungcheon becomes ruler of the Korean kingdom of Goguryeo (until 270).

==== By topic ====
====== Religion ======
- Cyprian, Christian writer of Berber descent, becomes bishop of Carthage.
- Origen writes an eight-volume work, criticizing the pagan writer Celsus.

=== 249 ===
==== By place ====
====== Roman Empire ======
- Trajan Decius puts down a revolt in Moesia and Pannonia. Loyal legionaries proclaim him emperor, and he leads them into Italy.
- Battle of Verona: Decius defeats and kills Emperor Philip the Arab.
- Decian persecution: Decius begins persecuting Christians, and others refusing to sacrifice publicly to the Roman gods for the well-being of the emperor.

====== Asia ======
- February 5 – Incident at Gaoping Tombs: In the Chinese state of Cao Wei, regent Sima Yi, in a coup d'état, forces his co-regent Cao Shuang to relinquish his power, after taking control of the capital city of Luoyang. Sima Yi issues a memorial, which lists the various crimes he and his associates has committed.

==== By topic ====
====== Religion ======
- In Alexandria, the populace pillages the homes of Christians.

== Births ==
240

- Lucian of Antioch, Syrian theologian and martyr (d. 312)
- Sporus of Nicaea, Greek mathematician (approximate date)
- Zenobia, queen of the Palmyrene Empire (d. 274)

241

- Cao Mao, Chinese emperor of the Cao Wei state in the Three Kingdoms period (d. 260)

242

- Saloninus, Roman emperor (d. 260)

243

- Sun Hao, Chinese emperor of the Eastern Wu state (d. 284)
- Sun Liang, Chinese emperor of the Eastern Wu state (d. 260)

244

- December 22 – Diocletian, Roman emperor (d. 311)
- Alexander of Constantinople, bishop of Byzantium (approximate date)

245

- Iamblichus, Syrian Neoplatonist philosopher (approximate date)
- Diocletian, Roman emperor

246

- Cao Huan, Chinese emperor of the Cao Wei state (d. 303)

247

- Pan Yue, Chinese poet and writer of the Jin Dynasty (d. 300)
- Prisca, Roman empress and wife of Diocletian (d. 315)

248

- Flavia Iulia Helena, Greco-Roman Augusta (empress), mother of Constantine I (approximate date) (d. 330)
- Li Liu (Cheng Han or Xuantong), Chinese Grand general (d. 303)
- Sima You (or Dayou), Chinese prince and politician (d. 283)

249

- Shi Chong (or Jilun), Chinese politician and statesman

== Deaths ==
240

- Ammonius Saccas, Neoplatonic philosopher (approximate date)
- Herodian of Antioch, Roman historian and writer (b. 170)
- Huang Quan (or Gongheng), Chinese general

241

- Sanatruq II, king of Hatra (Ending of the Kingdom of Hatra)
- Sun Deng, Chinese prince of the Eastern Wu state (b. 209)
- Sun Shao, Chinese general of the Eastern Wu state (b. 188)
- Zhuge Jin, Chinese general of the Eastern Wu state (b. 174)

242

- Ammonius Saccas, Egyptian philosopher (b. 175)
- Ardashir I, king of the Sassanid Empire (b. 180)
- Cao Hui, Chinese prince of the Cao Wei state
- Man Chong (or Boning), Chinese politician

243

- Gu Yong (or Yuantan), Chinese official and politician (b. 168)
- Hu Zong (or Weize), Chinese official and general (b. 183)
- Timesitheus, Roman advisor and praetorian prefect (b. 190)
- Xue Zong (or Jingwen), Chinese official, politician and poet

244

- February 11 – Gordian III, Roman emperor (b. 225)
- Cao Xun, Chinese prince of the Cao Wei state (b. 231)
- Ge Xuan (or Xiaoxian), Chinese Taoist (b. 164)
- Zhang Cheng (or Zhongsi), Chinese general (b. 178)

245

- Ammonius Saccas, Alexandrian-Greek philosopher (approximate date)
- Lu Xun (or Boyan), Chinese general and statesman (b. 183)
- Wu (or Wu Xian), Chinese empress of the Shu Han state
- Wu Can (or Kongxiu), Chinese official and politician
- Zhao Yan (or Boran), Chinese official and general (b. 171)
- Zhang Xiu (or Shusi), Chinese general and statesman (b. 205)

246

- Dong Yun (or Xiuzhao), Chinese general and politician
- Gu Tan (or Zimo), Chinese official and politician (b. 205)
- Jiang Wan (or Gongyan), Chinese general and statesman

247

- Abba Arikha, Babylonian Jewish scholar and rabbi (b. 175)
- Bu Zhi (or Zishan), Chinese general, official and statesman
- Xiang Lang (or Juda), Chinese general, official and politician
- Zhang Chunhua, wife of Sima Yi, regent of the Cao Wei state (b. 189)

248

- Dongcheon, Korean ruler of Goguryeo (b. 209)
- Himiko (or Shingi Waō), Japanese queen regnant (b. 170)
- Lady Triệu (Triệu Ẩu or Triệu Thị Trinh), Vietnamese female warrior (b. 226)
- Wang Ping, Chinese general and politician

249

- February 9
  - Bi Gui (or Zhaoxian), Chinese politician
  - Cao Shuang, Chinese general and regent
  - Deng Yang (or Xuanmao), Chinese politician
  - He Yan (or Pingshu), Chinese philosopher
  - Huan Fan (or Yuanze), Chinese general
  - Li Sheng (or Gongzhao), Chinese politician
- May 18 – Jiang Ji (or Zitong), Chinese general
- Jotapianus (or Jotapian), Roman usurper
- Ma Zhong (or Dexin), Chinese general and politician
- Philip II (the Younger), Roman emperor (b. 237)
- Philip the Arab, Roman general and emperor (b. 204)
- Quan Cong, Chinese general and politician (b. 198)
- Wang Bi, Chinese philosopher and politician (b. 226)
- Xu Miao (or Jingshan), Chinese politician (b. 172)
- Zhu Ran, Chinese adviser and general (b. 182)
