= 249 =

249 in various calendars
- Gregorian calendar: 249; CCXLIX
- Ab urbe condita: 1002
- Assyrian calendar: 4999
- Balinese saka calendar: 170–171
- Bengali calendar: −345 – −344
- Berber calendar: 1199
- Buddhist calendar: 793
- Burmese calendar: −389
- Byzantine calendar: 5757–5758
- Chinese calendar: 戊辰年 (Earth Dragon); 2946 or 2739 — to — 己巳年 (Earth Snake); 2947 or 2740
- Coptic calendar: −35 – −34
- Discordian calendar: 1415
- Ethiopian calendar: 241–242
- Hebrew calendar: 4009–4010
- Hindu calendars
- Vikram Samvat: 305–306
- Shaka Samvat: 170–171
- Kali Yuga: 3349–3350
- Holocene calendar: 10249
- Iranian calendar: 373 BP – 372 BP
- Islamic calendar: 384 BH – 383 BH
- Javanese calendar: 127–128
- Julian calendar: 249; CCXLIX
- Korean calendar: 2582
- Minguo calendar: 1663 before ROC 民前1663年
- Nanakshahi calendar: −1219
- Seleucid era: 560/561 AG
- Thai solar calendar: 791–792
- Tibetan calendar: ས་ཕོ་འབྲུག་ལོ་ (male Earth-Dragon); 375 or −6 or −778 — to — ས་མོ་སྦྲུལ་ལོ་ (female Earth-Snake); 376 or −5 or −777

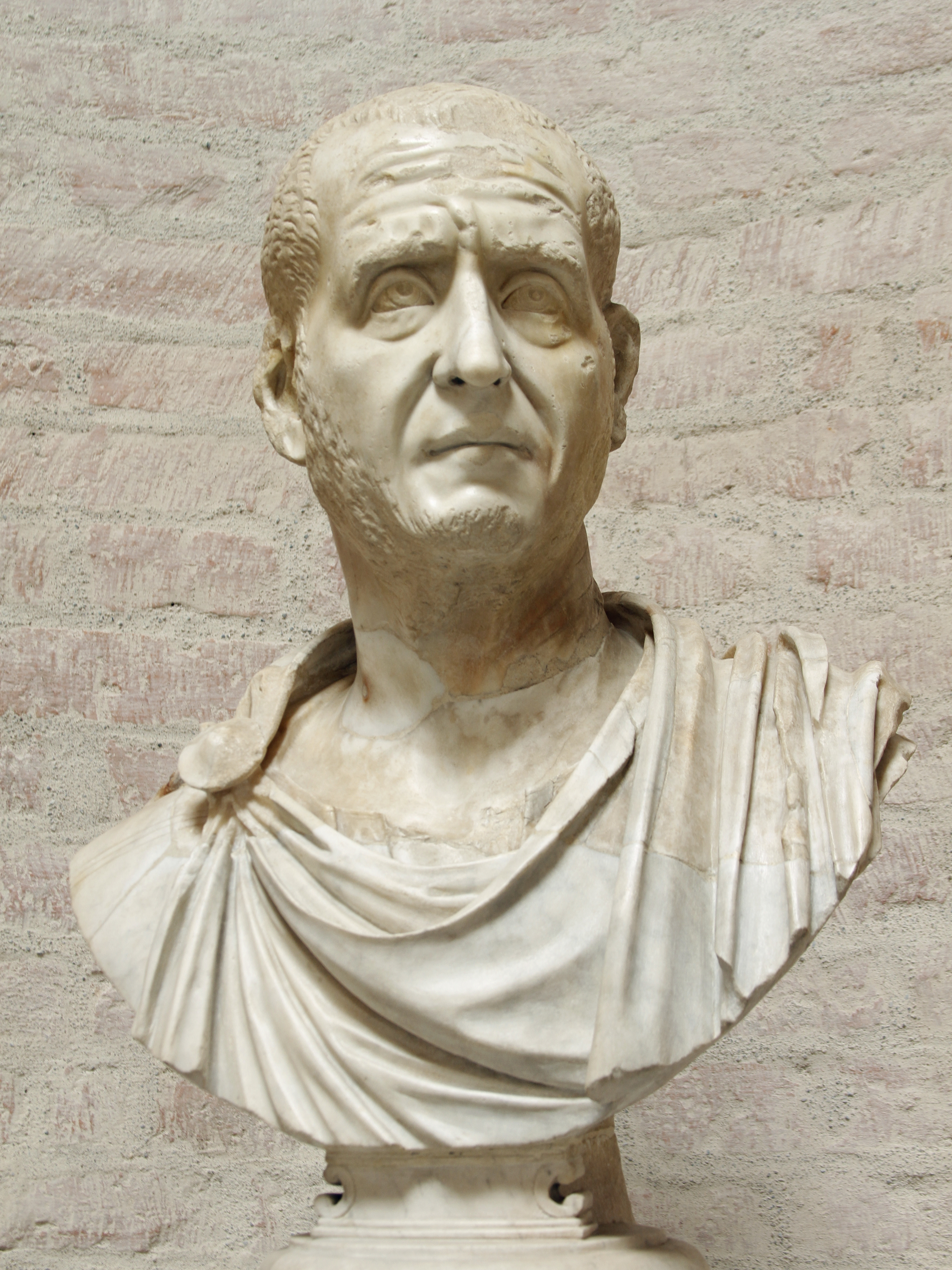
Emperor Trajan Decius (c. 201–251)

Year 249 (CCXLIX) was a common year starting on Monday of the Julian calendar. At the time, it was known as the Year of the Consulship of Gavius and Aquilinus (or, less frequently, year 1002 Ab urbe condita). The denomination 249 for this year has been used since the early medieval period, when the Anno Domini calendar era became the prevalent method in Europe for naming years.

== Events ==
=== By place ===
==== Roman Empire ====
- Trajan Decius puts down a revolt in Moesia and Pannonia. Loyal legionaries proclaim him emperor, and he leads them into Italy.
- Battle of Verona: Decius defeats and kills Emperor Philip the Arab.
- Decian persecution: Decius begins persecuting Christians, and others refusing to sacrifice publicly to the Roman gods for the well-being of the emperor.

==== Asia ====
- February 5 – Incident at Gaoping Tombs: In the Chinese state of Cao Wei, regent Sima Yi, in a coup d'état, forces his co-regent Cao Shuang to relinquish his power, after taking control of the capital city of Luoyang. Sima Yi issues a memorial, which lists the various crimes he and his associates has committed.

=== By topic ===
==== Religion ====
- Cyprian, Christian writer of Berber descent, becomes bishop of Carthage.
- In Alexandria, the populace pillages the homes of Christians.

== Births ==
- Shi Chong (or Jilun), Chinese politician and statesman

== Deaths ==
- February 9
  - Bi Gui (or Zhaoxian), Chinese politician
  - Cao Shuang, Chinese general and regent
  - Deng Yang (or Xuanmao), Chinese politician
  - He Yan (or Pingshu), Chinese philosopher
  - Huan Fan (or Yuanze), Chinese general
  - Li Sheng (or Gongzhao), Chinese politician
- May 18 – Jiang Ji (or Zitong), Chinese general
- Jotapianus (or Jotapian), Roman usurper
- Ma Zhong (or Dexin), Chinese general and politician
- Philip II (the Younger), Roman emperor (b. 237)
- Philip the Arab, Roman general and emperor (b. 204)
- Quan Cong, Chinese general and politician (b. 198)
- Wang Bi, Chinese philosopher and politician (b. 226)
- Xu Miao (or Jingshan), Chinese politician (b. 172)
- Zhu Ran, Chinese adviser and general (b. 182)
