= Sun Li (general) =

3rd century Cao Wei state general and official

- 孫禮

Minister of Works (司空)
- In office 6 February 250 – December 250 or January 251
- Monarch: Cao Fang
- Preceded by: Wang Ling
- Succeeded by: Sima Fu

Colonel-Director of Retainers (司隸校尉)
- In office ? – 6 February 250
- Monarch: Cao Fang
- Preceded by: Bi Gui

General of Inspiring Martial Might (振武將軍)
- In office ?–?
- Monarch: Cao Fang

Inspector of Bing Province (并州刺史)
- In office ?–?
- Monarch: Cao Fang

Colonel of the City Gates (城門校尉)
- In office ?–?
- Monarch: Cao Fang

Governor of Ji Province (冀州牧)
- In office ?–?
- Monarch: Cao Fang

Inspector of Jing Province (荊州刺史)
- In office ?–?
- Monarch: Cao Fang

Minister Steward (少府)
- In office ?–?
- Monarch: Cao Fang

Personal details
- Born: Unknown Rongcheng County, Hebei
- Died: December 250 or January 251 (Note: Cao Fang's biography in the Sanguozhi recorded that Sun Li died in the 11th month of the 2nd year of the Jiaping era of Cao Fang's reign. This month corresponds to 11 December 250 to 9 January 251 in the Gregorian calendar.)
- Occupation: Military general, politician
- Courtesy name: Deda (德達)
- Posthumous name: Marquis Jing (景侯)
- Peerage: Marquis of Dali Village (大利亭侯)

Sun Li (died December 250 or January 251), courtesy name Deda, was a Chinese military general and politician of the state of Cao Wei during the Three Kingdoms period of China. He was from Rongcheng County, Zhuo Commandery, which is present-day Rongcheng County, Hebei. He was known for being generous, loyal and brave.

Later, regent of Wei named Cao Shuang giving Sun Li the rank of regional inspector (刺史) of Yang Zhou province (揚州) which located on northern Anhui and Jiangsu. Sun Li also bestowed with the title of General putting down the waves (伏波將軍) and Marquis within the Passes (關內侯).

Later, Wu general named Quan Cong (全琮) invaded the region and prompted Sun Li to be sent to defend the area, where he meet Quan Cong in the battle of Shapo (芍陂). Sun Li managed to repel Quan Cong and promoted as Chamberlain for the Palace Revenues (少府) and was made regional governor (牧) of the province of Jizhou (冀州) which are in modern time Shanxi.

After the Incident at the Gaoping Tombs which resulted in the execution of Cao Shuang, Sima Yi appointed Sun Li as metropolitan commandant and further giving him the honorific title of Minister of Works (司空) and Neighbourhood Marquis of Dali (大利亭侯).

After his death, Sun Li were given a posthumous title as Marquis Jing (大利景侯).

== See also ==
- Lists of people of the Three Kingdoms
