= Zhaoxian =

Zhaoxian or Zhao Xian may refer to:

- Zhao County (赵县; Zhào Xiàn), Hebei, China
- Zhaoxian (Taoism) (照仙), "illuminated immortals", who achieve transcendence through constant periods of thought and recollection

People with the name Zhaoxian or Zhao Xian include:

- Bi Gui (died 249), courtesy name Zhaoxian (昭先), official of the state of Cao Wei
- Emperor Wenzong of Tang (809–840), posthumous name Emperor Zhaoxian (昭獻皇帝)
- Empress Dowager Du (c. 902–961), posthumous name Empress Dowager Zhaoxian (昭憲太后), mother of Emperor Taizu of Song
- Emperor Gong of Song (1271–1323), personal name Zhao Xian (趙㬎)

== See also ==
- King Zhaoxiang of Qin (秦昭襄王; 325–251 BC)
