= 183 =

183 may refer to:

- AD 183
- 183 BC
- 183 (number)
- 183 series
- TAKI 183
- UFC 183
- Mossberg 183
- Paragraph 183
- 183 Istria
- Pavel 183
