= 226 =

226 in various calendars
- Gregorian calendar: 226; CCXXVI
- Ab urbe condita: 979
- Assyrian calendar: 4976
- Balinese saka calendar: 147–148
- Bengali calendar: −368 – −367
- Berber calendar: 1176
- Buddhist calendar: 770
- Burmese calendar: −412
- Byzantine calendar: 5734–5735
- Chinese calendar: 乙巳年 (Wood Snake); 2923 or 2716 — to — 丙午年 (Fire Horse); 2924 or 2717
- Coptic calendar: −58 – −57
- Discordian calendar: 1392
- Ethiopian calendar: 218–219
- Hebrew calendar: 3986–3987
- Hindu calendars
- Vikram Samvat: 282–283
- Shaka Samvat: 147–148
- Kali Yuga: 3326–3327
- Holocene calendar: 10226
- Iranian calendar: 396 BP – 395 BP
- Islamic calendar: 408 BH – 407 BH
- Javanese calendar: 104–105
- Julian calendar: 226; CCXXVI
- Korean calendar: 2559
- Minguo calendar: 1686 before ROC 民前1686年
- Nanakshahi calendar: −1242
- Seleucid era: 537/538 AG
- Thai solar calendar: 768–769
- Tibetan calendar: ཤིང་མོ་སྦྲུལ་ལོ་ (female Wood-Snake); 352 or −29 or −801 — to — མེ་ཕོ་རྟ་ལོ་ (male Fire-Horse); 353 or −28 or −800

Year 226 (CCXXVI) was a common year starting on Sunday of the Julian calendar. At the time, it was known as the Year of the Consulship of Severus and Marcellus (or, less frequently, year 979 Ab urbe condita). The denomination 226 for this year has been used since the early medieval period, when the Anno Domini calendar era became the prevalent method in Europe for naming years.

== Events ==
=== By place ===
==== China ====
- A merchant from the Roman Empire, called "Qin Lun" by the Chinese, arrives in Jiaozhi (modern Hanoi), and is taken to see King Sun Quan of Eastern Wu, who requests him to make a report on his native country and people. He is given an escort for the return trip, including a present of ten male and ten female "blackish-colored dwarfs." However, the officer in charge of the Chinese escort dies, and Qin Lun has to continue his journey home alone.

==== Parthian Empire ====
- Ctesiphon, until now capital of the Parthian Empire, falls into the hands of the Sasanian Empire, who also make it their capital, after putting an end to the Parthian Dynasty in Iran.

== Births ==
- Lu Kang, Chinese general and politician (d. 274)
- Wang Bi (or Fusi), Chinese philosopher (d. 249)
- Saint Valentine, Roman patron saint (d. 269)

== Deaths ==
- June 29 – Cao Pi, Chinese emperor (b. 187)
- Farn-Sasan, king of the Parthian Kingdom
- Shi Xie, Chinese politician and warlord (b. 137)
- Xiahou Shang (or Boren), Chinese general
