= Jiang Ji =

Chinese Cao Wei state official and general (died 249)

- 蔣濟

Grand Commandant (太尉)
- In office 1 September 242 – 18 May 249
- Monarch: Cao Fang
- Preceded by: Man Chong
- Succeeded by: Wang Ling

General Who Leads the Army (領軍將軍)
- In office 239 – 1 September 242
- Monarch: Cao Fang

Regular Mounted Attendant (散騎常侍)
- In office ?–?
- Monarch: Cao Rui
- In office ?–223
- Monarch: Cao Pi

General Who Protects the Army (護軍將軍)
- In office ?–?
- Monarch: Cao Rui

Central Protector of the Army (中護軍)
- In office 228–?
- Monarch: Cao Rui

Master of Writing (尚書)
- In office 223–228
- Monarchs: Cao Pi; Cao Rui

East General of the Household (東中郎將)
- In office 223
- In office 220–?
- Monarch: Cao Pi

Chief Clerk of the Chancellor of State (相國長史)
- In office 15 March 220 – 11 December 220
- Monarch: Cao Pi

Personal details
- Born: Unknown Huai'an, Anhui
- Died: 18 May 249 (Note: Cao Fang's biography in the Sanguozhi recorded that Jiang Ji died on the bingzi day of the 4th month of the 1st year of the Jiaping era in Cao Fang's reign. (Note: [嘉平元年夏四月]丙子，太尉蔣濟薨。) Sanguozhi vol. 4.) This date corresponds to 18 May 249 in the Gregorian calendar.) Luoyang, Henan
- Children: Jiang Xiu; at least one other son
- Occupation: Official, general
- Courtesy name: Zitong (子通)
- Posthumous name: Marquis Jing (景侯)
- Peerage: Marquis of a Chief District (都鄉侯)

Jiang Ji (died 18 May 249), courtesy name Zitong, was an official and military general of the state of Cao Wei during the Three Kingdoms period of China. Born in the late Eastern Han dynasty, Jiang Ji started his career as a low-level official in his native Yang Province before becoming a subordinate of Cao Cao, the warlord who controlled the central government towards the end of the Eastern Han dynasty. After the end of the Eastern Han dynasty, he served in the state of Cao Wei through the reigns of the first three emperors – Cao Pi, Cao Rui and Cao Fang – and held various appointments in the military before rising to Grand Commandant, one of the top positions in the central government. During his service in Wei, he was known for being candid in giving advice to the emperor on various issues, including consolidating power, halting labour-intensive construction projects, and officials' abuses of power. In February 249, he joined the regent Sima Yi in staging a successful coup d'état against his co-regent Cao Shuang, but died from illness a few months later.

== Early life and career ==
Jiang Ji was from Ping'e County (平阿縣), Chu State (楚國), Yang Province, which is located north of present-day Huai'an, Anhui. (Note: (蔣濟字子通，楚國平阿人也。) Sanguozhi vol. 14.) He started his career as an accounting officer in the local commandery office and later became a provincial-level attendant officer. (Note: (仕郡計吏、州別駕。) Sanguozhi vol. 14.)

When Jiang Ji was serving in Yang Province, he was known for frequently consuming alcohol. One day, Shi Miao (時苗), the magistrate of Shouchun County in Yang Province, came to the provincial office to meet Jiang Ji but the latter was drunk. An angry Shi Miao then left. After he returned to Shouchun, he made a wooden statue, labelled it "Jiang Ji the drunkard" (酒徒蔣濟), placed it in front of a wall, and fired arrows at it day and night. (Note: (時苗字德胄，鉅鹿人也。 ... 出為壽春令，令行風靡。揚州治在其縣，時蔣濟為治中。苗以初至往謁濟，濟素嗜酒，適會其醉，不能見苗。苗恚恨還，刻木為人，署曰「酒徒蔣濟」，置之牆下，旦夕射之。) Pei Songzhi's annotation in Sanguozhi vol. 23.)

=== Battle of Hefei ===
In 208, the warlord Sun Quan, who controlled the territories in the Jiangdong (or Wu) region, led his forces to attack Hefei, the administrative centre of Yang Province, which was guarded by the provincial governor Liu Fu. At the time, Cao Cao, the warlord who controlled the Han central government, was at war with Sun Quan's forces in Jing Province and could not come to Liu Fu's aid. He sent a general Zhang Xi (張喜) to lead 1,000 horsemen to reinforce Hefei. Zhang Xi also received an order to bring along additional troops from the garrison at Runan Commandery (汝南郡; around present-day Xi County, Henan) along the way to Hefei. (Note: (建安十三年，孫權率衆圍合肥。時大軍征荊州，遇疾疫，唯遣將軍張喜單將千騎，過領汝南兵以解圍，頗復疾疫。) Sanguozhi vol. 14.)

In the meantime, Jiang Ji secretly suggested to Liu Fu to spread false news that Zhang Xi was leading 40,000 troops to reinforce Hefei, and that the reinforcements had reached Yulou County (雩婁縣; north of present-day Jinzhai County, Anhui). (Note: (濟乃密白刺史偽得喜書，云步騎四萬已到雩婁，遣主簿迎喜。) Sanguozhi vol. 14.) Liu Fu agreed and sent three messengers to bring fake letters out of Hefei. Only one of the three returned; the other two were captured by Sun Quan's forces. Sun Quan saw the letters and mistakenly believed that enemy reinforcements were approaching, so he ordered his troops to burn down their camp and retreat back to Jiangdong. The siege on Hefei was thus lifted. (Note: (三部使齎書語城中守將，一部得入城，二部為賊所得。權信之，遽燒圍走，城用得全。) Sanguozhi vol. 14.)

== Service under Cao Cao ==
=== Advising Cao Cao against relocating the residents of Huainan ===
In 209, when Jiang Ji met Cao Cao in Qiao County (譙縣; present-day Bozhou, Anhui), the latter asked him: "In the past, when I was at war with Yuan Shao at Guandu, I wanted to relocate the residents in Yan and Boma, but they refused to move. The enemy also did not dare to force them to move. Today, I want to relocate the residents of Huainan. What should I do?" (Note: (明年使於譙，太祖問濟曰：「昔孤與袁本初對官渡，徙燕、白馬民，民不得走，賊亦不敢鈔。今欲徙淮南民，何如？」) Sanguozhi vol. 14.)

Jiang Ji replied: "At the time, you were weak while your enemy was strong. If you didn't relocate those people, you would lose them to your enemy. However, since you defeated Yuan Shao, conquered Liucheng in the north, and advanced south towards the Yangtze and Han rivers and Jing Province, the Han Empire has trembled before your might and the people no longer think about opposing you. As people are emotionally attached to their homes, they wouldn't want to relocate elsewhere. If you force them to, they will feel fearful and uneasy." (Note: (濟對曰：「是時兵弱賊彊，不徙必失之。自破袁紹，北拔柳城，南向江、漢，荊州交臂，威震天下，民無他志。然百姓懷土，實不樂徙，懼必不安。」) Sanguozhi vol. 14.)

Cao Cao ignored Jiang Ji's advice and tried to force the people of Huainan to relocate. Jiang Ji was proven right as over 100,000 people from Huainan fled south across the Yangtze and settled in Jiangdong. (Note: (太祖不從，而江、淮間十餘萬衆，皆驚走吳。) Sanguozhi vol. 14.)

Some years later, when Jiang Ji visited Cao Cao in Ye (in present-day Handan, Hebei), Cao Cao laughed and told him: "I wanted to move those people further away from the enemy but ended up scaring them away instead." (Note: (後濟使詣鄴，太祖迎見大笑曰：「本但欲使避賊，乃更驅盡之。」) Sanguozhi vol. 14.)

=== Cao Cao's trust in Jiang Ji ===
Jiang Ji was subsequently appointed as the Administrator (太守) of Danyang Commandery (丹楊郡; around present-day Xuancheng, Anhui). (Note: (拜濟丹楊太守。) Sanguozhi vol. 14.) In late 209, after Cao Cao ordered his forces to retreat from Jing Province following their defeat at the Battle of Jiangling, he appointed Wen Hui as the Inspector (刺史) of Yang Province. He also reassigned Jiang Ji to serve as an attendant officer under Wen Hui, (Note: (大軍南征還，以溫恢為揚州刺史，濟為別駕。) Sanguozhi vol. 14.) and sent him a memo as follows: "When Ji Zha was a minister, the state of Wu should have had a ruler. Now that you have returned to your home province, I will have no worries." (Note: (令曰：「季子為臣，吳宜有君。今君還州，吾無憂矣。」) Sanguozhi vol. 14.)

On one occasion, when Cao Cao heard that some people have formally accused Jiang Ji of being the mastermind behind a treasonous plot, he wrote to Yu Jin and Feng Ren (封仁): "How could Jiang Ji be involved in something like this? If this really happened, it means that I am not a good judge of character. I am certain that the people are trying to stir up trouble by making such a false accusation." He also sent them a copy of his memo to Jiang Ji, and pressured them to throw out the case against Jiang Ji. (Note: (民有誣告濟為謀叛主率者，太祖聞之，指前令與左將軍于禁、沛相封仁等曰：「蔣濟寧有此事！有此事，吾為不知人也。此必愚民樂亂，妄引之耳。」促理出之。) Sanguozhi vol. 14.)

Jiang Ji was later reassigned to be a clerk in the office of the Imperial Chancellor, the position held by Cao Cao in the Han central government. Cao Cao sent a memo to Jiang Ji as follows: "When Gao Yao served under Emperor Shun, he caused those who were unkind and uncharitable to shun away. I place my hopes in a virtuous subordinate like you to uphold fairness." (Note: (辟為丞相主簿西曹屬。令曰：「舜舉臯陶，不仁者遠；臧否得中，望於賢屬矣。」) Sanguozhi vol. 14.)

=== Battle of Fancheng ===
In 219, Guan Yu, a general under a rival warlord Liu Bei, led his troops to attack Fancheng (樊城; present-day Fancheng District, Xiangyang, Hubei), which was guarded by Cao Cao's general Cao Ren. Cao Cao initially sent his general Yu Jin to lead reinforcements to Fancheng to assist Cao Ren, but a flood destroyed the reinforcements, and Yu Jin surrendered to Guan Yu. Upon learning of Yu Jin's defeat, Cao Cao felt that the imperial capital, Xu (許; present-day Xuchang, Henan), was too near enemy territory, so he considered moving the imperial capital further north into Hebei. (Note: (關羽圍樊、襄陽。太祖以漢帝在許，近賊，欲徙都。) Sanguozhi vol. 14.)

Jiang Ji and Sima Yi advised Cao Cao: "Yu Jin's defeat was not due to flaws in our defences, nor would it significantly affect us. Moving the imperial capital is showing our weakness to the enemy. It will cause panic in the regions around the Huai and Mian rivers. Sun Quan and Liu Bei seem close to each other, but they actually don't trust each other. Sun Quan will feel very uneasy upon seeing Guan Yu's victory, so we should incite him to attack Guan Yu's base in Jing Province. This will lift the siege on Fancheng." (Note: (司馬宣王及濟說太祖曰：「于禁等為水所沒，非戰攻之失，於國家大計未足有損。劉備、孫權，外親內踈，關羽得志，權必不願也。可遣人勸躡其後，許割江南以封權，則樊圍自解。」) Sanguozhi vol. 14.)

Cao Cao heeded Jiang Ji and Sima Yi's advice and did not relocate the imperial capital. In the winter of 219–220, Sun Quan ordered his general Lü Meng to lead his troops to attack the key bases of Liu Bei's territories in Jing Province: Gong'an and Jiangling counties. Guan Yu, who was totally caught off guard by Lü Meng's invasion, lost all of Liu Bei's territories in Jing Province. He was eventually captured in an ambush and executed by Sun Quan's forces. (Note: (太祖如其言。權聞之，即引兵西襲公安、江陵。羽遂見禽。) Sanguozhi vol. 14.)

== Service under Cao Pi ==
After Cao Cao died in March 220, his son Cao Pi succeeded him as the vassal King of Wei (魏王) under the Eastern Han dynasty. Cao Pi then reassigned Jiang Ji to be the Chief Clerk (長史) under Hua Xin, the Chancellor of State (相國) of his vassal kingdom at the time. (Note: (文帝即王位，轉為相國長史。) Sanguozhi vol. 14.) In December 220, Cao Pi usurped the throne from the figurehead Emperor Xian, ended the Eastern Han dynasty, and established the state of Cao Wei (or Wei) to replace the Eastern Han dynasty with himself as the new emperor.

After his coronation as emperor, Cao Pi appointed Jiang Ji as East General of the Household (東中郎將). (Note: (及踐阼，出為東中郎將。) Sanguozhi vol. 14.) When Jiang Ji sought permission to remain in the central government, Cao Pi denied him permission and issued an imperial decree to him as follows: "Emperor Gaozu once sang, 'Where will I find brave men to guard the four corners of my land?' The Empire is not peaceful yet. We need capable officials to guard the borders. It is still not too late for you to retire when the borders are peaceful." (Note: (濟請留，詔曰：「高祖歌曰『安得猛士守四方』！天下未寧，要須良臣以鎮邊境。如其無事，乃還鳴玉，未為後也。」) Sanguozhi vol. 14.) Jiang Ji later wrote the Wan Ji Lun (萬機論; Myriad Subtleties), a treatise on government, and presented it to Cao Pi, who applauded his work. Jiang Ji was subsequently recalled to the central government to serve as a Mounted Regular Attendant (散騎常侍). (Note: (濟上萬機論，帝善之。入為散騎常侍。) Sanguozhi vol. 14.)

=== Cautioning Cao Pi against issuing an inappropriate edict ===
On one occasion, Cao Pi sent an edict to his general Xiahou Shang as follows: "You are one of my most trusted generals and you are capable of assuming this responsibility. My kindness towards you is worth dying for, and my favour towards you is worth keeping close to your heart. You can do as you please, and you can decide whether people should live or die." (Note: (時有詔，詔征南將軍夏侯尚曰：「卿腹心重將，時當任使。恩施足死，惠愛可懷。作威作福，殺人活人。」尚以示濟。) Sanguozhi vol. 14.) He then showed a copy of the edict to Jiang Ji and asked him, "What do you think of the culture in this Empire?" (Note: (濟旣至，帝問曰；「卿所聞見天下風教何如？」) Sanguozhi vol. 14.)

Jiang Ji replied, "I don't see anything good. I only see words suggesting an empire's downfall." (Note: (濟對曰：「未有他善，但見亡國之語耳。」) Sanguozhi vol. 14.) When a shocked Cao Pi asked him to explain, Jiang Ji said, "History has warned us against 'doing as you as please'. The ancients also cautioned us that 'the Son of Heaven should not speak in jest'. I hope that Your Majesty will be more careful with your words!" (Note: (帝忿然作色而問其故，濟具以荅，因曰：「夫『作威作福』，書之明誡。『天子無戲言』，古人所慎。惟陛下察之！」) Sanguozhi vol. 14.) Cao Pi understood what Jiang Ji meant and immediately rescinded his edict. (Note: (於是帝意解，遣追取前詔。) Sanguozhi vol. 14.)

=== Battle of Ruxu ===
In 222, Jiang Ji accompanied the Wei general Cao Ren on a campaign against Wei's rival state, Eastern Wu, and led a detachment of troops to attack Xianxi (羨溪; northeast of present-day Wuwei County, Anhui). (Note: (黃初三年，與大司馬曹仁征吳，濟別襲羨溪。) Sanguozhi vol. 14.) When Cao Ren wanted to attack the Wu-controlled dock at Ruxu (濡須; north of present-day Wuwei County, Anhui), Jiang Ji warned him: "The enemy has occupied the west riverbank and lined up their ships on the upper stream. By leading your troops to attack the island, you are heading straight into hell. This is a path to defeat and destruction." When Cao Ren ignored Jiang Ji's advice and led his troops to attack Ruxu, he ended up being defeated by the Wu defenders. (Note: (仁欲攻濡須洲中，濟曰：「賊據西岸，列船上流，而兵入洲中，是為自內地獄，危亡之道也。」仁不從，果敗。) Sanguozhi vol. 14.)

After Cao Ren died in 223, Cao Pi reassigned Jiang Ji to serve as East General of the Household (東中郎將) again and put him temporarily in charge of the units which used to be under Cao Ren's command. (Note: (仁薨，復以濟為東中郎將，代領其兵。) Sanguozhi vol. 14.) He sent an edict to Jiang Ji as follows: "You are well-versed in both civil and military affairs, and you are loyal and passionate. As I know that you have the ambition of crossing the river and conquering Wu, I hereby put you in this position of military command." (Note: (詔曰：「卿兼資文武，志節忼愾，常有超越江湖吞吳會之志，故復授將率之任。」) Sanguozhi vol. 14.) However, not long later, he removed Jiang Ji from his command and reassigned him to serve as a Master of Writing (尚書) in the imperial secretariat. (Note: (頃之，徵為尚書。) Sanguozhi vol. 14.)

=== Incident at Guangling ===
Between September and December 224, (Note: The Zizhi Tongjian recorded that this took place between the 8th and 10th months of the 5th year of the Huangchu era (220–226) of Cao Pi's reign. These months correspond to 20 September to 17 December 224 in the Gregorian calendar.) Cao Pi went on an inspection tour of Qiao Commandery (譙郡; around present-day Bozhou, Anhui), he decided to set sail along the Huai River towards Guangling Commandery (廣陵郡; around present-day Huai'an, Jiangsu), where he had stationed a naval fleet of over 100,000 troops in preparation for an invasion of the Wu capital, Jianye (present-day Nanjing, Jiangsu).

During this time, Jiang Ji wrote a memorial to the emperor to inform him that the harsh winter weather made it difficult for vessels to sail through the waterways into the Yangtze. He also wrote an essay, "San Zhou Lun" (三州論; "Essay on the Three Provinces"), to indirectly persuade Cao Pi to turn back, but the emperor ignored him and ordered his vessels to sail to Guangling Commandery anyway. (Note: (車駕幸廣陵，濟表水道難通，又上三州論以諷帝。帝不從， ...) Sanguozhi vol. 14.) At Guangling Commandery, after seeing the weather and the Wu defences, the emperor gave up on his plan for invasion and retreated. The Wu general Sun Shao seized this opportunity to send his subordinate Gao Shou (高壽) and 500 men to launch a night raid on Cao Pi's convoy. They succeeded in their attempt and even made off with the parasol of Cao Pi's chariot.

As the Wei naval fleet was stranded due to the weather, some officials proposed that the troops go ashore, break up into agricultural colonies, and start growing crops to ensure that they have adequate food supplies (i.e., the tuntian system). Jiang Ji, however, strongly objected to this approach as he thought that it was too dangerous because the colonies would be too near the Chao Lake to the east and the Huai River to the north, so the Wu forces could take advantage of the high tide period to attack them. (Note: (... 於是戰船數千皆滯不得行。議者欲就留兵屯田，濟以為東近湖，北臨淮，若水盛時，賊易為寇，不可安屯。) Sanguozhi vol. 14.)

Cao Pi heeded Jiang Ji's advice and brought along his troops as they retreated by land. By the time they reached the Jing Lake (精湖), the tide had subsided so Cao Pi left behind all the vessels for Jiang Ji to dispose of them. (Note: (帝從之，車駕即發。還到精湖，水稍盡，盡留船付濟。) Sanguozhi vol. 14.) As the vessels were all scattered along the waterways, Jiang Ji ordered his men to dig an additional four or five connecting waterways, gather all the vessels in one location, and build a dam there to block the flow of water from the lake. When the dam was full, they opened it and allowed the force of the water to flush all the vessels out of the waterways into the Huai River. (Note: (船本歷適數百里中，濟更鑿地作四五道，蹴船令聚；豫作土豚遏斷湖水，皆引後船，一時開遏入淮中。) Sanguozhi vol. 14.)

After Cao Pi returned to the Wei capital, Luoyang, he told Jiang Ji: "I have to tell you something. I originally wanted to burn down half of all the vessels in the Shanyang Pool, but you disposed of those vessels and even managed to return to Qiao Commandery around the same time as me. Every piece of advice you gave me thus far is in line with my thoughts. From now on, if we have any plans on attacking the enemy, I hope you will share your views and participate in the discussions." (Note: (帝還洛陽，謂濟曰：「事不可不曉。吾前決謂分半燒舩於山陽池中，卿於後致之，略與吾俱至譙。又每得所陳，實入吾意。自今討賊計畫，善思論之。」) Sanguozhi vol. 14.)

== Service under Cao Rui ==
In 227, after Cao Rui succeeded his father Cao Pi as the emperor of Wei, he enfeoffed Jiang Ji as a Secondary Marquis (關內侯). (Note: (明帝即位，賜爵關內侯。) Sanguozhi vol. 14.)

=== Battle of Shiting ===
In the following year, when the Wei general Cao Xiu led his troops to attack Wu forces at Wan (皖; present-day Qianshan County, Anhui), Jiang Ji wrote a memorial to Cao Rui as follows: "I do not think it is advisable for Cao Xiu to lead his men deep into enemy territory to engage Sun Quan's elite troops. Besides, there is a risk that Zhu Ran and the Wu forces stationed upstream would attack Cao Xiu from the rear." (Note: (大司馬曹休帥軍向皖，濟表以為「深入虜地，與權精兵對，而朱然等在上流，乘休後，臣未見其利也。」) Sanguozhi vol. 14.) When Cao Xiu and his army reached Wan, the Wu forces advanced to Anlu (安陸). After hearing about this, Jiang Ji wrote another memorial to Cao Rui: "The enemy is pretending to attack from the west when they actually plan to attack from the east. Your Majesty should quickly send reinforcements to help them." (Note: (軍至皖，吳出兵安陸，濟又上疏曰：「今賊示形於西，必欲并兵圖東，宜急詔諸軍往救之。」) Sanguozhi vol. 14.)

At the time, Cao Xiu and his army had fallen into a Wu ambush at Shiting (石亭; near present-day Qianshan County, Anhui) and suffered heavy casualties in addition to losing weapons, armour and equipment. (Note: (會休軍已敗，盡棄器仗輜重退還。) Sanguozhi vol. 14.) Just when the Wu forces were preparing to trap Cao Xiu and his surviving men at Jiakou (夾口), Wei reinforcements showed up so the Wu forces retreated and thus Cao Xiu managed to survive. Jiang Ji was subsequently reassigned to serve as Central Protector of the Army (中護軍). (Note: (吳欲塞夾口，遇救兵至，是以官軍得不沒。遷為中護軍。) Sanguozhi vol. 14.)

=== Advising Cao Rui on centralising power ===
At the time, Jiang Ji perceived that the officials who held two key appointments in the imperial palace – Prefect of the Palace Writers (中書令) and Supervisor of the Palace Writers (中書監) – wielded too much power, so he wrote a memorial to Cao Rui as follows: (Note: (時中書監、令號為專任，濟上疏曰： ...) Sanguozhi vol. 14.)

"If officials wield too much power, the state will be in peril. If the ruler gets too close to his subjects, his judgment will be clouded. These are lessons from history. In the past, when powerful officials dominated politics, there was turmoil within and outside the government. (Note: (「大臣太重者國危，左右太親者身蔽，古之至戒也。往者大臣秉事，外內扇動。) Sanguozhi vol. 14.) Your Majesty has earned everyone's respect for your wisdom and knowledge, and for personally seeing to all affairs of the state. If Your Majesty's authority and influence diminishes vis-à-vis your officials, everyone will gradually lose respect for you even when they may not necessarily be disloyal towards you. This is how things will naturally turn out. (Note: (陛下卓然自覽萬機，莫不祗肅。夫大臣非不忠也，然威權在下，則衆心慢上，勢之常也。) Sanguozhi vol. 14.) While Your Majesty treats your key officials in a fair and objective manner, I hope that you will do the same for your close attendants. Even though your close attendants are probably better at pleasing people, they may not be as loyal, upright, wise, virtuous and capable as your key officials. (Note: (陛下旣已察之於大臣，願無忘於左右。左右忠正遠慮，未必賢於大臣，至於便辟取合，或能工之。) Sanguozhi vol. 14.) As of now, whenever officials talk about work, they tend to mention the Palace Writers a lot. I know that Your Majesty has ordered the Palace Writers to behave in a respectful and humble manner, and to refrain from having private dealings outside the palace. However, once it becomes known that Your Majesty favours them, they can exert a corrupting influence on people. Moreover, as the Palace Writers are highly influential and have close contact with Your Majesty, the officials will start currying favour with them because they know that the Palace Writers are the ones who make decisions when Your Majesty is unwell. (Note: (今外所言，輒云中書，雖使恭慎不敢外交，但有此名，猶惑世俗。況實握事要，日在目前，儻因疲倦之間有所割制，衆臣見其能推移於事，即亦因時而向之。) Sanguozhi vol. 14.) Once there is such a precedent, the Palace Writers will try to consolidate greater power by influencing political discourse and giving out favours to officials in exchange for their support. If this happens, the principles of fairness will be distorted, and rewards and punishments will no longer be given out fairly. They will also try to monopolise the channels of communication between Your Majesty and the officials by giving preferential access to those who fawn on them. As Your Majesty keeps them by your side and highly trusts them, you may not realise that they are influencing your judgment. In such a situation, a wise emperor will show his people that he knows what is going on throughout his empire, so that his close attendants will know that they cannot influence him. (Note: (一有此端，因當內設自完，以此衆語，私招所交，為之內援。若此，臧否毀譽，必有所興，功負賞罰，必有所易；直道而上者或壅，曲附左右者反達。因微而入，緣形而出，意所狎信，不復猜覺。此宜聖智所當早聞，外以經意，則形際自見。) Sanguozhi vol. 14.) None of the key officials have spoken up on this issue yet probably because they are afraid of offending Your Majesty's close attendants. I sincerely believe that Your Majesty can think for yourself, listen to advice from different people, and be able to distinguish between good and bad, and truth and falsehood, and thereby take action accordingly. In doing so, Your Majesty will be comparable to the Yellow Emperor and Emperor Yao of ancient times, and Emperor Wu and Emperor Wen of more recent times. By then, will we still need to talk about the prevailing culture? (Note: (或恐朝臣畏言不合而受左右之怨，莫適以聞。臣竊亮陛下潛神默思，公聽並觀，若事有未盡於理而物有未周於用，將改曲易調，遠與黃、唐角功，近昭武、文之迹，豈近習而已哉！) Sanguozhi vol. 14.) As it is impossible for Your Majesty to govern the entire empire alone, you will need to delegate authority to your officials. When Your Majesty puts an official in multiple appointments, you should make sure that he is as loyal as the Duke of Zhou and as fair as Guan Yiwu, or else he will monopolise power and use it for corrupt purposes. (Note: (然人君猶不可悉天下事以適己明，當有所付。三官任一臣，非周公旦之忠，又非管夷吾之公，則有弄機敗官之弊。) Sanguozhi vol. 14.) As of now, there are not many officials capable of serving as pillars of the state, but there are many who are virtuous, competent, wise, loyal, faithful and hardworking enough to assume important responsibilities. They will prevent Your Majesty's government from becoming a corrupt government. (Note: (當今柱石之士雖少，至於行稱一州，智效一官，忠信竭命，各奉其職，可並驅策，不使聖明之朝有專吏之名也。」) Sanguozhi vol. 14.)

In response, Cao Rui sent Jiang Ji an edict which read: "Rulers rely on subjects of strong character. (Jiang) Ji is well-versed in both civil and military affairs and he performs his duties faithfully. Every time there is a discussion on major issues, he will either send in a memorial or speak up to express his views. I am very impressed by his initiative and loyalty." (Note: (詔曰：「夫骨鯁之臣，人主之所仗也。濟才兼文武，服勤盡節，每軍國大事，輒有奏議，忠誠奮發，吾甚壯之。」) Sanguozhi vol. 14.) Cao Rui then promoted Jiang Ji to General Who Protects the Army (護軍將軍) and granted him an additional appointment as a Mounted Regular Attendant (散騎常侍). (Note: (就遷為護軍將軍，加散騎常侍。) Sanguozhi vol. 14.)

=== Advising Cao Rui against attacking Liaodong ===
In 232, Cao Rui wanted to order Tian Yu and Wang Xiong (王雄), who were respectively the governors of Ping and You provinces, to lead their troops to attack the Liaodong region, which was then ruled by the warlord Gongsun Yuan, a vassal of the Cao Wei state. Tian Yu and Wang Xiong would lead their forces to attack Liaodong via sea and land respectively. (Note: (司馬彪戰略曰：太和六年，明帝遣平州刺史田豫乘海渡，幽州刺史王雄陸道，并攻遼東。) Sima Biao's Zhanlue annotation in Sanguozhi vol. 14.)

When Jiang Ji heard about it, he wrote a memorial to Cao Rui to dissuade the emperor from attacking Liaodong:

"A ruler should not be so eager to attack a non-hostile foreign state or a non-traitorous vassal. If he fails to defeat them, he will only force them to oppose him. That is why there is such a saying: 'When the tiger or wolf blocks your path, you do not attack the fox or raccoon dog. You should eliminate the greater threat first, and then the lesser threat will weaken on its own.' The people of Liaodong have been loyal towards you for generations and have been paying tribute every year. Even if you succeed in conquering Liaodong and capture its people and riches, the gains would be so minimal that they would not significantly benefit you. If you fail to conquer Liaodong, you will not only lose their trust but also antagonise them." (Note: (蔣濟諫曰：「凡非相吞之國，不侵叛之臣，不宜輕伐。伐之而不制，是驅使為賊。故曰『虎狼當路，不治狐狸。先除大害，小害自已』。今海表之地，累世委質，歲選計考，不乏職貢。議者先之，正使一舉便克，得其民不足益國，得其財不足為富；儻不如意，是為結怨失信也。」) Sima Biao's Zhanlue annotation in Sanguozhi vol. 14.)

Cao Rui ignored Jiang Ji's advice and ordered Tian Yu to go ahead and attack Liaodong. Tian Yu and his troops pulled back without any success from the campaign. (Note: (帝不聽，豫行竟無成而還。) Sima Biao's Zhanlue annotation in Sanguozhi vol. 14.)

=== Advising Cao Rui against his construction projects ===
During the Jingchu era (237–239) of Cao Rui's reign, the Cao Wei state not only frequently waged war against its rival states Eastern Wu and Shu Han, but also embarked on labour-intensive palace construction projects. The wars and projects took a heavy toll on the common people and incurred much public resentment against the Wei government. To make matters worse, the poor harvest during those years also led to a shortage of grain. (Note: (景初中，外勤征役，內務宮室，怨曠者多，而年糓饑儉。) Sanguozhi vol. 14.)

Jiang Ji wrote a memorial to Cao Rui as follows:

"Your Majesty should continue to build on the progress made by your predecessors and expand their glorious legacy. Now is not the time for you to relax and rule the Empire as if it were peace time. Although the Empire covers territories from 12 provinces, its total population is actually less than the population of a single commandery in the Han dynasty. As our two rival states have yet to be vanquished, our soldiers still stand guard at the borders and spend their time either farming or fighting. This has resulted in widespread public resentment. (Note: (濟上疏曰：「陛下方當恢崇前緒，光濟遺業，誠未得高枕而治也。今雖有十二州，至於民數，不過漢時一大郡。二賊未誅，宿兵邊陲，且耕且戰，怨曠積年。) Sanguozhi vol. 14.) While the imperial palace and ancestral temple have yet to be fully built, there are too few people working on agriculture and there are many people who do not have enough to feed and clothe themselves. Therefore, our current exigencies are to stop draining energy and resources from the people, and let the people rest and recuperate. When hundreds of thousands of starving and exhausted people encounter a natural disaster, they will no longer be willing to submit to authority. We should not deprive the people of an opportunity to grow food and stock up when they have the chance to. (Note: (宗廟宮室，百事草創，農桑者少，衣食者多，今其所急，唯當息耗百姓，不至甚弊。弊攰之民，儻有水旱，百萬之衆，不為國用。凡使民必須農隙，不奪其時。) Sanguozhi vol. 14.) A ruler who wishes to become powerful should carefully assess the strengths and weaknesses of his people, and help them alleviate their poverty, pain and suffering. In the past, Goujian encouraged his people to increase their population for uses in the future, while King Zhao of Yan showed compassion towards his people who died from disease and gained their support in helping him avenge their humiliation later on. That was how a weak state like Yan could defeat a more powerful state like Qi, and how the weak Yue could conquer its more powerful rival Wu. As of now, if you do not attack our two rival states, you will not be able to destroy them. Since you do not want to give in to them, then you should attack them. If you do not eliminate them when you are still alive, future generations will hold you responsible. (Note: (夫欲大興功之君，先料其民力而燠休之。句踐養胎以待用，昭王恤病以雪仇，故能以弱燕服彊齊，羸越滅勁吳。今二敵不攻不滅，不事即侵，當身不除，百世之責也。) Sanguozhi vol. 14.) If Your Majesty can put your wisdom and intelligence to good use, put aside those unimportant issues for now, and focus solely on eliminating our rival states, then I think nothing will be too hard for Your Majesty. Moreover, indulgence in sensual pleasures will only drain away a person's energy. If a person keeps losing energy, he will become weak and feeble, and that will ultimately take a toll on his health and well-being. I hope that Your Majesty will choose to do the things that will benefit not just yourself, but future generations as well. As for all other less important issues, I think you should temporarily put them aside and ignore them, so as to keep your mind sharp and focused." (Note: (以陛下聖明神武之略，舍其緩者，專心討賊，臣以為無難矣。又歡娛之躭，害於精爽；神太用則竭，形太勞則弊。願大簡賢妙，足以充『百斯男』者。其宂散未齒，且悉分出，務在清靜。」) Sanguozhi vol. 14.)

In response, Cao Rui sent Jiang Ji an edict which read: "If I did not have you, General Who Protects the Army, I will not be able to hear such advice." (Note: (詔曰：「微護軍，吾弗聞斯言也。」) Sanguozhi vol. 14.)

=== Analysing Gongsun Yuan's alliance with Sun Quan ===
In 238, when Gongsun Yuan learnt that Cao Rui was planning to attack him, he pledged allegiance to Sun Quan, the emperor of Eastern Wu, and asked Sun Quan to send reinforcements to Liaodong to help him. (Note: (漢晉春秋曰：公孫淵聞魏將來討，復稱臣於孫權，乞兵自救。) Han Jin Chunqiu annotation in Sanguozhi vol. 14.) When Cao Rui heard about it, he asked Jiang Ji, "Do you think Sun Quan will send troops to Liaodong?" (Note: (帝問濟：「孫權其救遼東乎？」) Han Jin Chunqiu annotation in Sanguozhi vol. 14.)

Jiang Ji replied: "He knows that our defences are strong and that he won't gain any advantage. If he sends his forces deep into enemy territory, it won't be a sustainable campaign; if he attacks only the periphery, it will be a waste of manpower and resources for him. Sun Quan doesn't even care when his sons and brothers are in danger, so why would he care about a distant ally who has humiliated him before? The reason why he is spreading news that he will be sending aid to Gongsun Yuan is because he wants to confuse us. He will only take action if we fail to defeat Gongsun Yuan. However, as we are separated by land and water from Liaodong, if we attack Liaodong, we must ensure that we conquer it swiftly, or else Sun Quan might send lightly armed forces to launch small raids at our borders. This is something we should be wary of." (Note: (濟曰：「彼知官備以固，利不可得，深入則非力所能，淺入則勞而無獲；權雖子弟在危，猶將不動，況異域之人，兼以往者之辱乎！今所以外揚此聲者，譎其行人疑於我，我之不克，兾折後事已耳。然沓渚之間，去淵尚遠，若大軍相持，事不速決，則權之淺規，或能輕兵掩襲，未可測也。」) Han Jin Chunqiu annotation in Sanguozhi vol. 14.)

== Service under Cao Fang ==
In January 239, following Cao Rui's death, his adopted son Cao Fang succeeded him as the next emperor of Wei. After his coronation, Cao Fang reassigned Jiang Ji to serve as General Who Leads the Army (領軍將軍) and enfeoffed him as the Marquis of Changling Village (昌陵亭侯). On 1 September 242, he promoted Jiang Ji to the position of Grand Commandant (太尉) (Note: (齊王即位，徙為領軍將軍，進爵昌陵亭侯，遷太尉。) Sanguozhi vol. 14.) to replace Man Chong, who died some months earlier. (Note: Cao Fang's biography in the Sanguozhi recorded that Jiang Ji was appointed as the Grand Commandant on the yiyou day of the 7th month of the 3rd year of the Zhengshi era in Cao Fang's reign. (Note: ([正始三年]三月，太尉滿寵薨。 ... [七月]乙酉，以領軍將軍蔣濟為太尉。) Sanguozhi vol. 4.) This date corresponds to 1 September 242 in the Gregorian calendar.)

=== Debate on the Cao clan's ancestry ===
When there was a discussion in the imperial court on the ritual for ancestor veneration in outdoor settings, Gaotang Long suggested that the emperor should also worship the mythical Emperor Shun, who was believed to be the ancestor of the Cao clan, the imperial clan of Wei. Jiang Ji, however, disagreed and wrote a memorial to point out that Gaotang Long was wrong. He noted that the mythical emperor's family name was actually Gui (媯) and that his descendants later adopted Tian (田) as their family name, therefore he was not an ancestor of the Cao clan. (Note: (初，侍中高堂隆論郊祀事，以魏為舜後，推舜配天。濟以為舜本姓媯，其苗曰田，非曹之先，著文以追詰隆。) Sanguozhi vol. 14.)

In his annotations to Jiang Ji's biography in the Sanguozhi, Pei Songzhi recorded that Jiang Ji claimed that there was a line on Cao Teng's tombstone which read: "The Cao clan originated from Zhu". Pei Songzhi also noted that the Book of Wei (魏書), the official history of the Cao Wei state, confirmed Jiang Ji's claim. (Note: (臣松之案蔣濟立郊議稱曹騰碑文云「曹氏族出自邾」，魏書述曹氏胤緒亦如之。) Pei Songzhi's annotation in Sanguozhi vol. 14.)

However, Pei Songzhi also pointed out that there was evidence which contradicted Jiang Ji's claim. When Cao Cao wrote his own family history, he mentioned that he descended from Cao Shu Zhenduo (曹叔振鐸), the first ruler of the vassal state of Cao and a member of the royal clan of the Zhou dynasty. Cao Cao's son Cao Zhi also wrote in a eulogy for his father that they descended from the royal clan of the Zhou dynasty. (Note: (魏武作家傳，自云曹叔振鐸之後。故陳思王作武帝誄曰：「於穆武王，胄稷胤周。」此其不同者也。) Pei Songzhi's annotation in Sanguozhi vol. 14.) In the early Jingchu era (237–239), Cao Rui accepted Gaotang Long's claim that the Wei emperors descended from Emperor Shun. When the Jin dynasty replaced the Cao Wei state, Cao Huan's abdication statement contained the following line: "my imperial ancestor was Yu (Shun)". This resulted in greater discrepancies between sources on the Cao clan's ancestry. (Note: (及至景初，明帝從高堂隆議，謂魏為舜後，後魏為禪晉文，稱「昔我皇祖有虞」，則其異彌甚。) Pei Songzhi's annotation in Sanguozhi vol. 14.)

Gaotang Long was not the only person whom Jiang Ji argued with over the ancestry of the Cao clan. Jiang Ji also debated extensively with Miao Xi (繆襲) and they wrote to each other several times throughout the debate. Their writings, however, were not recorded in history as there were too many. Although Jiang Ji ultimately could not determine the Cao clan's ancestry, he concluded that it was nonsensical and disrespectful to honour Emperor Shun as the Cao clan's ancestor when he was not, and that doing so would be equivalent to insulting Cao Cao. The mistake was not corrected at the time. (Note: (尋濟難隆，及與尚書繆襲往反，並有理據，文多不載。濟亦未能定氏族所出，但謂「魏非舜後而橫祀非族，降黜太祖，不配正天，皆為繆妄」。然于時竟莫能正。) Pei Songzhi's annotation in Sanguozhi vol. 14.)

=== Speaking up against Cao Shuang's abuses of power ===
Between 239 and 249, the regent Cao Shuang effectively controlled the central government and monopolised power. His supporters, who included Ding Mi (丁謐) and Deng Yang, changed the laws to suit their purposes whenever they wanted. (Note: (是時，曹爽專政，丁謐、鄧颺等輕改法度。) Sanguozhi vol. 14.)

When there was a solar eclipse, Cao Fang summoned all the officials to ask them if it was a bad omen. (Note: (會有日蝕變，詔群臣問其得失， ...) Sanguozhi vol. 14.) In response to the emperor's question, Jiang Ji wrote a memorial as follows:

"In the past, when Emperor Shun ruled, he warned his subjects against forming factions to pursue their own interests. When the Duke of Zhou served as regent, he also took great care to prevent the officials from forming factions. When the Marquis of Qi asked about natural disasters, Yan Ying advised him to show care and compassion towards the people. When the Lord of Lu asked about strange phenomena, Zangsun urged him to reduce corvée. (Note: (... 濟上疏曰：「昔大舜佐治，戒在比周；周公輔政，慎於其朋；齊侯問災，晏嬰對以布惠；魯君問異，臧孫荅以緩役。) Sanguozhi vol. 14.) The people have the ability to follow the will of Heaven and avert natural disasters. As of now, our two rival states have yet to be vanquished, and our soldiers have been away at the battlefields for over a decade. Men and women are very resentful and the people suffer from poverty. (Note: (應天塞變，乃實人事。今二賊未滅，將士暴露已數十年，男女怨曠，百姓貧苦。) Sanguozhi vol. 14.) Only someone of great talent should be entrusted with the important responsibility of designing and establishing a state's legal system, so that it can be passed on to future generations. How can any low- or mid-level official simply change the laws as he pleases? This will not only be of no benefit to the state, but also be harmful to the people's well-being. I hope that Your Majesty will order all officials to know their place and perform their duties faithfully, so as to achieve peace and harmony. By doing so, we will be able to create an atmosphere that will attract prosperity and good luck." (Note: (夫為國法度，惟命世大才，乃能張其綱維以垂于後，豈中下之吏所宜改易哉？終無益於治，適足傷民，望宜使文武之臣各守其職，率以清平，則和氣祥瑞可感而致也。」) Sanguozhi vol. 14.)

=== Incident at Gaoping Tombs ===
On 5 February 249, Jiang Ji joined Sima Yi, Cao Shuang's co-regent, in staging a coup d'état against Cao Shuang when Cao Shuang was away with Cao Fang on a visit to the Gaoping Tombs (高平陵). After Sima Yi and his supporters seized control of the imperial capital Luoyang, Jiang Ji accompanied them as they led their troops to the floating bridge above the Luo River outside Luoyang. There, Sima Yi sent a memorial to Cao Fang, listing out Cao Shuang's "crimes" (e.g., not fulfilling his duty as regent, corrupting the government) and requesting the emperor to remove Cao Shuang and his brothers from their positions of power. Cao Shuang ultimately surrendered and relinquished his powers as regent to Sima Yi. On 9 February 249, a powerless Cao Shuang, along with his family, his supporters and their families, were rounded up and executed on charges of treason. (Note: (以隨太傅司馬宣王屯洛水浮橋，誅曹爽等， ...) Sanguozhi vol. 14.)

=== Later life and death ===
After the coup d'état, Cao Fang issued an edict to elevate Jiang Ji from the status of a village marquis to a Marquis of a Chief District (都鄉侯) and award him a marquisate comprising 700 taxable households. (Note: (進封都鄉侯，邑七百戶。) Sanguozhi vol. 14.) However, Jiang Ji declined the honour and wrote a memorial as follows:

"I am ashamed of having been in Your Majesty's favour, while allowing Cao Shuang to harbour such traitorous thoughts. It is a form of negligence on my part. When the Grand Tutor acted autocratically and decisively, Your Majesty showed understanding towards his loyalty and ensured that the guilty were punished accordingly. This is to the people's benefit. Rewards should be given to those who have shown merit or made good contributions. I can neither forecast the future when it comes to long-term planning, nor command the troops when it comes to war. I have failed to give appropriate advice to my superiors, and failed to prevent my subordinates from clouding my judgment. As I hold an important office, the people will pay close attention to everything I say and do. I am truly worried that if I accept this honour, I will be setting a negative example for people to follow. People will think that they can get rewarded even when they have done nothing meritorious, and will be less inclined to show humility and politeness in accepting rewards." (Note: (濟上疏曰：「臣忝寵上司，而爽敢苞藏禍心，此臣之無任也。太傅奮獨斷之策，陛下明其忠節，罪人伏誅，社稷之福也。夫封寵慶賞，必加有功。今論謀則臣不先知，語戰則非臣所率，而上失其制，下受其弊。臣備宰司，民所具瞻，誠恐冒賞之漸自此而興，推讓之風由此而廢。」) Sanguozhi vol. 14.)

Cao Fang denied him permission and insisted that he accept the peerage and marquisate. (Note: (固辭，不許。) Sanguozhi vol. 14.) The Jin dynasty historian Sun Sheng praised Jiang Ji for showing good conscience when he declined the honour. He remarked that Jiang Ji's behaviour fit the saying: "neither was he tempted by greed nor did he feel ashamed of being righteous". (Note: (孫盛曰：蔣濟之辭邑，可謂不負心矣。語曰「不為利回，不為義疚」，蔣濟其有焉。) Sun Sheng's annotation in Sanguozhi vol. 14.)

Jiang Ji died on 18 May 249 and was honoured with the posthumous title "Marquis Jing" (景侯). (Note: (是歲薨，謚曰景侯。) Sanguozhi vol. 14.)

The Shiyu (世語) recorded that during the Incident at the Gaoping Tombs, Jiang Ji wrote to Cao Shuang and promised him that Sima Yi only wanted him to give up his powers as regent. When Cao Shuang was executed after his downfall, Jiang Ji felt so upset for failing to keep his promise that he fell sick and eventually died about three months later. (Note: (世語曰：初，濟隨司馬宣王屯洛水浮橋，濟書與曹爽，言宣王旨「惟免官而已」，爽遂誅滅。濟病其言之失信，發病卒。) Shiyu annotation in Sanguozhi vol. 14.)

== Family and descendants ==
Jiang Ji's son, Jiang Xiu (蔣秀), inherited his father's peerage as a Marquis of a Chief District (都鄉侯). After Jiang Xiu died, his son Jiang Kai (蔣凱) inherited the peerage in turn. During the Xianxi era (264–265), the Cao Wei government established a new five-rank nobility system and converted Jiang Kai's peerage to the Viscount of Xiacai (下蔡子). (Note: (子秀嗣。秀薨，子凱嗣。咸熈中，開建五等，以濟著勳前朝，改封凱為下蔡子。) Sanguozhi vol. 14.)

== Encounter with the supernatural ==
When Jiang Ji held the position of General Who Leads the Army (領軍將軍), his wife dreamt about their deceased son crying out to her: "I am separated from you by death. When I was still alive, I was a son of a government official and general. Now when I am in the netherworld, I have become a lowly servant to the gods of Mount Tai. I feel so depressed and humiliated! There is a scholar-official called Sun E (孫阿) who lives west of the imperial ancestral temple. He will soon be summoned to the netherworld to serve as the magistrate of Mount Tai. I hope that you, Mother, can help me ask Father to inform Sun E and request him to reassign me to a better place." (Note: (列異傳曰：濟為領軍，其婦夢見亡兒涕泣曰：「死生異路，我生時為卿相子孫，今在地下為泰山五伯，憔悴困辱，不可復言。今太廟西謳士孫阿，今見召為泰山令，願母為白侯，屬阿令轉我得樂處。」) Lieyi Zhuan annotation in Sanguozhi vol. 14.) After Jiang Ji's wife woke up, she told her husband about her dream, but he dismissed it and said, "It's just a dream. There's nothing to worry about." (Note: (言訖，母忽然驚寤，明日以白濟。濟曰：「夢為爾耳，不足恠也。」) Lieyi Zhuan annotation in Sanguozhi vol. 14.)

The following night, Jiang Ji's wife dreamt about her son again. This time, he told her: "I am here to welcome the new magistrate from the imperial ancestral temple. I am able to visit you now as I still have some free time before my mission starts. The new magistrate will be leaving tomorrow at noon. As I will be very busy tomorrow, I won't be able to visit you. I hope that you will speak to Father again. There is no harm trying." He then described Sun E's physical appearance in detail. (Note: (明日暮，復夢曰：「我來迎新君，止在廟下。未發之頃，暫得來歸。新君明日日中當發，臨發多事，不復得歸，永辭於此。侯氣彊，難感悟，故自訴於母，願重啟侯，何惜不一試驗之？」遂道阿之形狀，言甚備悉。) Lieyi Zhuan annotation in Sanguozhi vol. 14.) In the morning, Jiang Ji's wife told her husband: "As you said, there's nothing to worry about since it's a dream. However, this is too much of a coincidence. Besides, there is no harm trying." (Note: (天明，母重啟侯：「雖云夢不足恠，此何太適？適亦何惜不一驗之？」) Lieyi Zhuan annotation in Sanguozhi vol. 14.)

Jiang Ji then sent his men to find Sun E, and they found him near the imperial ancestral temple. He looked exactly like how Jiang Ji's son described him. (Note: (濟乃遣人詣太廟下，推問孫阿，果得之，形狀證驗悉如兒言。) Lieyi Zhuan annotation in Sanguozhi vol. 14.) Jiang Ji shed tears and said, "I nearly let my son down!" He then told Sun E about his wife's dreams. (Note: (濟涕泣曰：「幾負吾兒！」於是乃見孫阿，具語其事。) Lieyi Zhuan annotation in Sanguozhi vol. 14.) When Sun E heard that he was going to die soon, he was not afraid at all and even felt delighted when he heard that he would become a magistrate in the netherworld. He told Jiang Ji, "If what you said is true, I am most willing to help him. However, I don't know what your son wants." Jiang Ji replied, "Maybe you can just assign him to a job that he enjoys doing." After Sun E promised Jiang Ji that he would do so, Jiang Ji presented him expensive gifts and returned to his office. (Note: (阿不懼當死，而喜得為泰山令，惟恐濟言不信也。曰：「若如節下言，阿之願也。不知賢子欲得何職？」濟曰：「隨地下樂者與之。」阿曰：「輒當奉教。」乃厚賞之，言訖遣還。) Lieyi Zhuan annotation in Sanguozhi vol. 14.)

As Jiang Ji was eager to verify his wife's dreams, he deployed a line of guards from his office to the imperial ancestral temple, with a space of 10 steps between every two guards, so that they could relay any information from the temple to him in the shortest time possible. Later that morning, he heard that Sun E suffered a heart attack. By noon, he received news that Sun E was dead. (Note: (濟欲速知其驗，從領軍門至廟下，十步安一人，以傳消息。辰時傳阿心痛，巳時傳阿劇，日中傳阿亡。) Lieyi Zhuan annotation in Sanguozhi vol. 14.) He wept and said, "Although I feel sad that my son died early, I am also pleased to know that he will be doing well in the netherworld." A month later, Jiang Ji's wife told her husband that she dreamt about their son again, and he told her that Sun E had reassigned him to be a secretary/scribe. (Note: (濟泣曰：「雖哀吾兒之不幸，自喜亡者有知。」後月餘，兒復來語母曰：「已得轉為錄事矣。」) Lieyi Zhuan annotation in Sanguozhi vol. 14.)

== See also ==
- Lists of people of the Three Kingdoms
