= Huan Fan =

Chinese Cao Wei official and general (died 249)

- 桓範

Minister of Finance (大司農)
- In office ? – 5 February 249
- Monarch: Cao Fang

Governor of Ji Province (冀州牧)
- In office ?–?
- Monarch: Cao Rui

Inspector of Yan Province (兗州刺史)
- In office ?–?
- Monarch: Cao Rui

East General of the Household (東中郎將)
- In office ?–?
- Monarch: Cao Rui

General Who Attacks Barbarians (征虜將軍)
- In office ?–?
- Monarch: Cao Rui

Personal details
- Born: Unknown Suixi County, Anhui
- Died: 9 February 249 (Note: Cao Fang's biography in the Sanguozhi recorded that Cao Shuang and his associates – Ding Mi (丁謐), Deng Yang, He Yan, Bi Gui, Li Sheng and Huan Fan – were executed along with their extended families on the wuxu day of the 1st month of the 1st year of the Jiaping era of Cao Fang's reign. This date corresponds to 9 February 249 in the Gregorian calendar.) Luoyang, Henan
- Occupation: Official, general
- Courtesy name: Yuanze (元則)

Huan Fan (died 9 February 249), courtesy name Yuanze, was an official and military general of the state of Cao Wei during the Three Kingdoms period of China.

== Life ==
Huan Fan was from Pei State (沛國), which is around present-day Suixi County, Anhui. (Note: As such, Huan Fan was most likely a clansman of the Eastern Jin warlord Huan Wen. When describing Huan Fan's origins, the Weilve only recorded that his clan had been prominent for generations. Huan Wen's direct lineage could be traced to his grandfather Huan Hao, who was recorded in his father Huan Yi's biography in Book of Jin. Also, Huan Yi was born in c.276, as he was 53 (by East Asian reckoning) when he was killed in c.August 328.) He started his career in the late Eastern Han dynasty as a minor official in the office of the Imperial Chancellor, the position held by Cao Cao, the warlord who controlled the central government and the figurehead Emperor Xian at the time. Sometime in early 220, he was promoted to Left Supervisor (左監) of the Feathered Forest (羽林) section of the imperial guards. Later that year, Cao Cao's son Cao Pi usurped the throne from Emperor Xian and established the Cao Wei state with himself as the new emperor. Cao Pi put Huan Fan, Wang Xiang (王象) and Liu Shao in charge of writing the Huang Lan (皇覽).

During the reign of the second Wei emperor Cao Rui (r. 226–239), Huan Fan served as a Master of Writing (尚書) and Commandant of the Central Army (中領軍). Later, he was promoted to East General of the Household (東中郎將) and General Who Attacks Barbarians (征虜將軍), granted imperial authority, and put in charge of overseeing military affairs in Qing and Xu provinces.

During his tenure, Huan Fan got into a housing dispute with Zheng Qi (鄭歧), the Inspector (刺史) of Xu Province. He attempted to abuse his powers by executing Zheng Qi, but the latter reported him to the imperial court first, resulting in Huan Fan being dismissed from office. However, Huan Fan was soon recalled to serve in the Wei government, first as the Inspector of Yan Province and later as the Governor of Ji Province. When he saw that Lü Zhao (呂昭) (Note: The Tang Kaiyuan Zhanjing recorded that Lü Zhao was General Who Guards the North when he died on 24 Dec 246 in the Julian calendar.) had reached a higher position than him even though Lü started serving in the Cao Wei state later than him, he became unhappy and claimed to be ill and stayed at home. (Note: It is possible that Huan wanted to keep a low profile as when he was discussing his unhappiness with his wife Lady Zhongchang, Lady Zhongchang criticized him by reminding him that the Zheng Qi incident showed that he didn't know how to be a superior. Now, by feeling aggrieved over Lü Zhao's career, he showed that he didn't know how to be a subordinate. Angered by the criticism, Huan used the ring pommel of his sword to hit Lady Zhongchang's abdomen. Lady Zhongchang, who was pregnant at the time, suffered a miscarriage and died.)

During the Zhengshi era (240–249) in the reign of the third Wei emperor Cao Fang, Huan Fan was appointed as the Minister of Finance (大司農). He gained a reputation for being an honest and thrifty official, and was even referred to as "a bag of wisdom" (智囊). Cao Shuang, the general serving as a regent for the emperor Cao Fang, treated Huan Fan cordially and respectfully, but was not close to him. During his regency, Cao Shuang and his brothers often went out on excursions because they believed that no one posed a threat to them. Huan Fan tried to advise them to be more mindful but they ignored him.

In early 249, Cao Shuang and his brothers followed the emperor Cao Fang out of the imperial capital Luoyang to visit the Gaoping Tombs. During their absence, Cao Shuang's co-regent, Sima Yi, used the opportunity to stage a coup d'état against Cao Shuang in Luoyang. He ordered all the gates of Luoyang to be shut and then issued an order to Huan Fan in Empress Dowager Guo's name, ordering him to take command of the troops under Cao Xi (曹羲), Cao Shuang's brother. Just as Huan Fan was about to follow the order, his son urged him to side with Cao Shuang instead since Cao Shuang had a political advantage over Sima Yi because the emperor Cao Fang was with him. Huan Fan agreed and headed to Gaoping Tombs, against the advice of his subordinates. He managed to leave Luoyang through the Changping Gate because Si Fan (司蕃), the officer guarding the gate, used to serve under him and trusted him when he said he had authorisation to leave.

After meeting Cao Shuang and his brothers at Gaoping Tombs, Huan Fan urged them to bring Cao Fang to Xuchang, issue an imperial edict in the emperor's name and denounce Sima Yi as a traitor and call all military forces in the Cao Wei state to attack Sima Yi. He also reassured the Cao brothers that they would not run out of food supplies because he, as the Minister of Finance, had full control over the distribution of food supplies. However, Cao Shuang and his brothers eventually decided to surrender to Sima Yi after Sima Yi promised them that they and their families would not be harmed if they handed over power to him. When Huan Fan heard about it, he cried, "How could a hero like Cao Zidan have calves like you all as his sons? How could he have not foreseen that one day his family will be doomed because of all of you!" After returning to Luoyang, Huan Fan was arrested along with Cao Shuang and his brothers, charged with treason, and executed along with the rest of their families.

== See also ==
- Lists of people of the Three Kingdoms
