= Bi Gui =

Cao Wei state official (died 249)

- 畢軌

Colonel-Director of Retainers (司隷校尉)
- In office c. 240s – February 5, 249
- Monarch: Cao Fang
- Succeeded by: Sun Li

Personal details
- Born: Unknown
- Died: 9 February 249 (Note: Cao Fang's biography in the Sanguozhi recorded that Cao Shuang and his associates – Ding Mi (丁謐), Deng Yang, He Yan, Bi Gui, Li Sheng and Huan Fan – were executed along with their extended families on the wuxu day of the 1st month of the 1st year of the Jiaping era of Cao Fang's reign. This date corresponds to 9 February 249 in the Gregorian calendar.) Luoyang, Henan
- Parent: Bi Zili (father)
- Occupation: Official
- Courtesy name: Zhaoxian (昭先)

Bi Gui (died 9 February 249), courtesy name Zhaoxian, was an official serving in the state of Cao Wei during the Three Kingdoms period of China.

== Life ==
Bi Gui's father, Bi Zili (畢子禮), (Note: "Zili" was actually the courtesy name of Bi Gui's father. His personal name was not recorded in history.) served as a Colonel of Agriculture (典農校尉) in the late Eastern Han dynasty during the reign of Emperor Xian. Bi Gui, who was from Dongping Commandery (東平郡; covering parts of present-day Shandong and Henan), was known for his talent since he was young.

When Cao Rui was still the crown prince, Bi Gui served in the Imperial Academy (文學). He was appointed as a Chief Clerk (長史) in the final years of the reign of Cao Pi, the first ruler of Wei. In 227, Cao Rui ascended the throne upon the death of his father, Cao Pi. Bi Gui became very wealthy as he not only served as a Gentleman of the Yellow Gate (黃門郎), but also had his son married to a Wei princess.

Bi Gui was appointed as the Inspector (刺史) of Bing Province later and was known for behaving arrogantly while he was in office. Around the time, the Xianbei tribes in the north often raided the Wei border and killed Wei citizens. Around 233, Budugen, a Xianbei chieftain who had initially submitted to Wei, was discovered to be secretly maintaining contact with Kebineng, another Xianbei leader who had been staging raids at the Wei border. Bi Gui wrote a memorial to the Wei court, requesting for permission to attack the Xianbei and pressure Budugen into remaining loyal to Wei. Cao Rui read the memorial and felt that it was unwise to attack the Xianbei at the time because it would only result in Budugen and Kebineng becoming more united. He issued an order to Bi Gui, ordering the latter to not advance beyond Juzhu (句注). However, Bi Gui received the order too late as he had already led an army past Juzhu and was garrisoning at Yinguan (陰館). He ordered his deputies Su Shang (蘇尚) and Dong Bi (董弼) to lead their forces to attack the Xianbei. Kebineng sent about 1,000 horsemen to reinforce Budugen. They encountered the Wei army led by Su Shang and Dong Bi and clashed at Loufan (樓煩). The Wei forces were defeated and both Su Shang and Dong Bi were killed in action. Budugen rebelled against Wei and led his forces to join Kebineng and they raided Wei's border together. The Xianbei were driven away later by an army led by the Wei general Qin Lang. The Wei official Jiang Ji suggested to Cao Rui to reassign Bi Gui to another province on the grounds that Bi was not competent enough to govern Bing Province, an important location in Wei.

During the Zhengshi era (240–249) in the reign of Cao Fang (Cao Rui's successor), Bi Gui was consecutively appointed as Central Protector of the Army (中護軍), Palace Attendant (侍中), Master of Writing (尚書) and Colonel-Director of Retainers (司隷校尉). He became a close aide to the Wei regent Cao Shuang, who often heeded his advice. Bi Gui, Ding Mi (丁謐) and Cao Shuang's other aides urged Cao to be wary of his co-regent Sima Yi, whom they considered a threat to their lord. In 249, Sima Yi successfully seized power from Cao Shuang in the Incident at Gaoping Tombs and had Cao and all his associates arrested. Bi Gui, Cao Shuang and Cao's other aides were executed along with their families for alleged treason.

== See also ==
- Lists of people of the Three Kingdoms
