= Deng Yang =

Chinese Cao Wei state official (died 249)

- 鄧颺

Master of Writing (尚書)
- In office ? – 5 February 249
- Monarch: Cao Fang

Palace Attendant (侍中)
- In office ? – 5 February 249
- Monarch: Cao Fang

Chief Clerk (長史) (under Cao Shuang)
- In office ?–?
- Monarch: Cao Fang

Administrator of Yingchuan (潁川太守)
- In office ?–?
- Monarch: Cao Fang

Personal details
- Born: Unknown Xinye County, Henan
- Died: 9 February 249 (Note: Cao Fang's biography in the Sanguozhi recorded that Cao Shuang and his associates – Ding Mi (丁謐), Deng Yang, He Yan, Bi Gui, Li Sheng and Huan Fan – were executed along with their extended families on the wuxu day of the 1st month of the 1st year of the Jiaping era of Cao Fang's reign. This date corresponds to 9 February 249 in the Gregorian calendar.) Luoyang, Henan
- Relations: Deng Yu (ancestor)
- Occupation: Official
- Courtesy name: Xuanmao (玄茂)

Deng Yang (died 9 February 249), courtesy name Xuanmao, was an official of the state of Cao Wei in the Three Kingdoms period of China.

== Life ==
Deng Yang was a descendant of Deng Yu, an official who helped Liu Xiu to establish the Eastern Han dynasty. He was from Xinye County (新野縣), Nanyang Commandery (南陽郡), which is present-day Xinye County, Henan.

At a young age, Deng Yang was already famous in Luoyang, the imperial capital of the Cao Wei state in the Three Kingdoms period. His fame put him on par with other contemporaries such as Xiahou Xuan, Zhuge Dan and Tian Chou. He held the positions of Gentleman of Writing (尚書郎), Palace Gentleman (中書郎), and Prefect (令) of Luoyang during the reign of Cao Rui (r. 226–239), the second Wei emperor. However, he was later dismissed from office for engaging in superficial and fame-seeking behaviour. (Note: This incident was the "fu hua an" (浮华案); an edict was issued on 5 March 230, decreeing that officials deemed to have "mere appearances and no actual talent" were to be dismissed. Known officials affected by this decree include He Yan, Zhuge Dan, Li Sheng, Deng Yang, and Xiahou Xuan. Note that most of the officials mentioned here later died in the aftermath of the Incident at the Gaoping Tombs, Xiahou Xuan was accused of a plot against Sima Shi and executed, while Zhuge Dan died while rebelling against Sima Zhao.)

In 239, following Cao Rui's death, Cao Fang became the new emperor. However, as Cao Fang was still too young at the time, Cao Shuang and Sima Yi ruled as regents on his behalf. Through some political manoeuvres, Cao Shuang removed Sima Yi from power and became the sole dominant figure in the Wei government, while Sima Yi claimed to be ill and remained at home. During this time, Cao Shuang appointed Deng Yang as the Administrator (太守) of Yingchuan Commandery (潁川郡) and later as a Chief Clerk (長史) under him. As one of Cao Shuang's close aides, Deng Yang was subsequently promoted to Palace Attendant (侍中) and Master of Writing (尚書).

While Deng Yang was in office, he engaged in corrupt and nepotist practices. For example, he once gave an official appointment to Zang Ai (臧艾) in return for Zang Ai giving him one of his father's concubines as a mistress. At the time, there was a saying in Luoyang which mocked Deng Yang: "Deng Xuanmao gives out official positions in return for women." Because of his status and connections to Cao Shuang, Deng Yang, together with Ding Mi and He Yan were called the "three dogs". It was also around this time when Cao Shuang was in power that a Nanyang officer Gui Tai (圭泰) offended Cao Shuang and his followers, and Deng Yang wished to severely punish Gui Tai. Sima Qi (司馬岐), son of Sima Zhi, reproached Deng Yang for exercising his power to take revenge. Deng Yang was mortified and furious, and yielded.

In 244, Deng Yang and Li Sheng advised Cao Shuang to launch a military campaign against Wei's rival state, Shu, to boost his fame and authority in Wei. Cao Shuang ultimately lost the Battle of Xingshi against the Shu forces and his prestige fell as the Wei forces suffered heavy casualties in the campaign.

In 249, while Cao Shuang and the emperor Cao Fang were away at the Gaoping Tombs, Sima Yi used the opportunity to stage a coup d'état against Cao Shuang and seized control of Luoyang. Cao Shuang surrendered to Sima Yi after the latter promised him that he and his family would be unharmed if he gave up his powers as regent. Later, Sima Yi broke his promise as he had Cao Shuang and his supporters (including Deng Yang) arrested, charged with treason, and executed along with their families. Just days before on 28 January, the diviner Guan Lu met with He Yan following He Yan's invitation. Deng Yang was with He Yan when they met, and Guan Lu predicted their deaths.

== See also ==
- Lists of people of the Three Kingdoms
- Incident at Gaoping Tombs
