= Incident at the Gaoping Tombs =

Coup d'état in the state of Cao Wei (249)

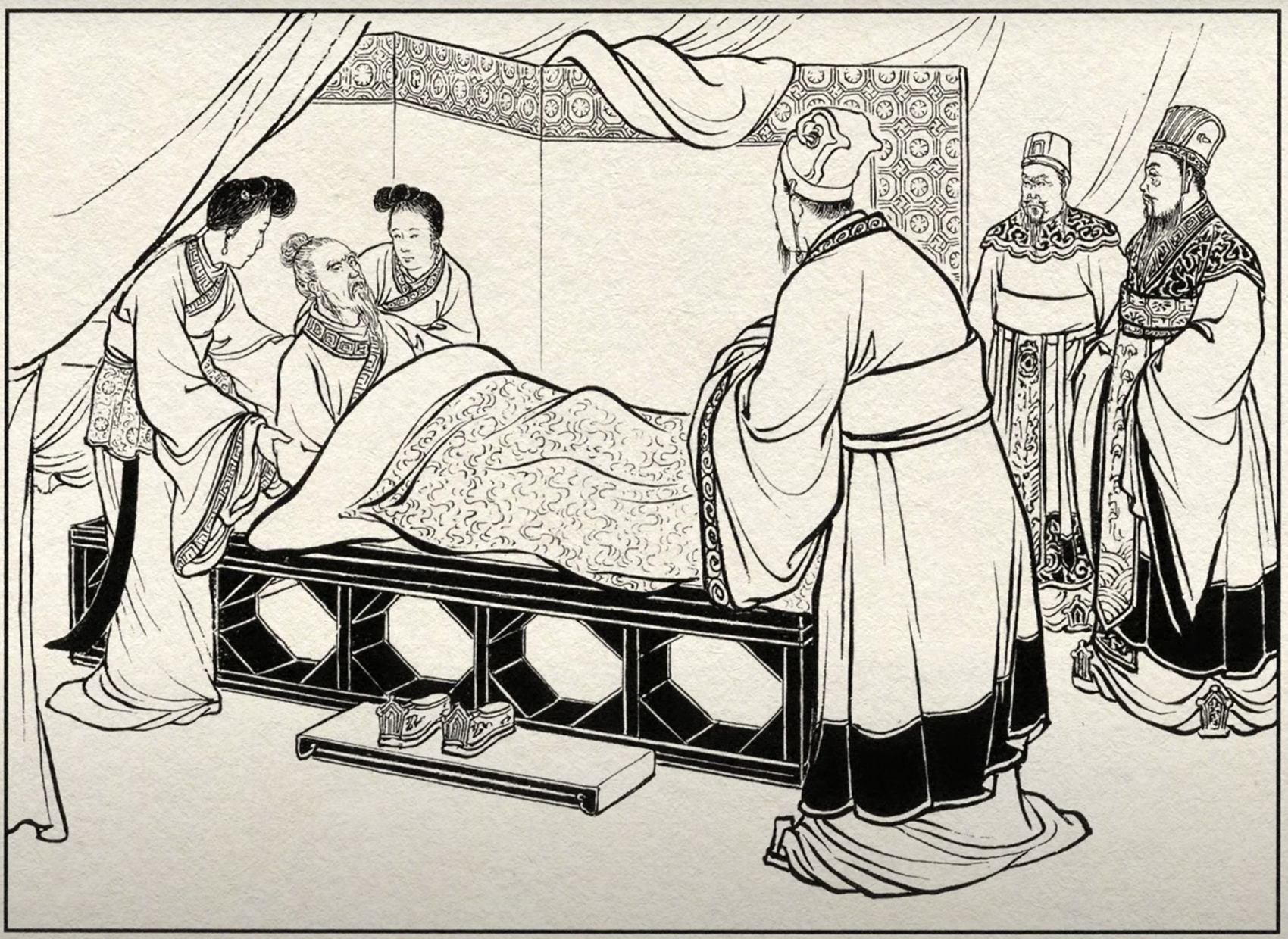
- Sima Yi feigned illness to trick Cao Shuang, 1957 lianhuanhua
Date	5 February 249
Location	Luoyang, Henan
Result	Sima Yi seized power from Cao Shuang

Belligerents
Sima Yi	Cao Shuang

Commanders and leaders
Sima Yi; Sima Shi	Cao Shuang; Cao Xi; Cao Xun

Incident at the Gaoping Tombs
- Traditional Chinese: 高平陵之變
- Simplified Chinese: 高平陵之变
Transcriptions
Standard Mandarin
- Hanyu Pinyin: Gāopínglǐng zhī biàn

The Incident at the Gaoping Tombs was a coup d'état that took place on 5 February 249 in the state of Cao Wei during the Three Kingdoms period (220–280) of China. The parties involved were Sima Yi and Cao Shuang, who were both regents for the Cao Wei emperor Cao Fang, who was then about 17 years old. On that day, while Cao Shuang and his brothers accompanied the emperor on a visit to the Gaoping tombs (Cao Rui's mausoleum), Sima Yi staged a coup d'état; taking control of the capital city of Luoyang and issuing a memorial which listed out the various crimes Cao Shuang had committed. Cao Shuang surrendered and gave up his powers after further receiving reassurance that he and his family would be spared, thinking that he could still live a life in luxury. Shortly thereafter, Cao Shuang, his brothers, and his supporters were charged with treason and executed along with their families on 9 February. The coup d'état increased the Sima family's influence and paved the way for the eventual replacement of the Cao Wei regime by the Sima family's Jin dynasty in February 266.

== Background ==
In January 239, the Cao Wei emperor Cao Rui died and was succeeded by his seven-year-old adopted son, Cao Fang. Before his death, Cao Rui named General-in-Chief Cao Shuang and Grand Commandant Sima Yi as regents to assist Cao Fang.

Cao Shuang wanted to dominate the Wei government, so he used a series of political manoeuvres to consolidate and concentrate power in the hands of himself, his brothers Cao Xi (曹羲) and Cao Xun (曹訓), and their supporters. He heeded the advice of He Yan, Deng Yang and Ding Mi (丁謐), and relocated Empress Dowager Guo (Cao Rui's widow) to Yongning Palace (永寧宮) so that she could not interfere in politics. He also put his brothers in command of the military, promoted his close aides to higher positions in the imperial court, and made changes to the political structure to benefit himself and his clique. Sima Yi tried to stop Cao Shuang but failed to do so. Cao Shuang became increasingly distrustful and wary of Sima Yi. In June or July 247, Sima Yi claimed that he was ill and withdrew from the political scene. At the time, there was a saying in Luoyang which went: "He (Yan), Deng (Yang) and Ding (Mi) create turmoil in the imperial capital."

In April or May 248, Zhang Dang (張當), a palace eunuch, illegally transferred 11 women out of the imperial harem and presented them to Cao Shuang to be his concubines. Cao Shuang and his close aides thought that Sima Yi was seriously ill and could no longer do anything, so they plotted with Zhang Dang to overthrow the emperor Cao Fang and put Cao Shuang on the throne. However, they were still wary of Sima Yi and did not lower their guard against him.

At the time, Li Sheng, one of Cao Shuang's supporters, had been recently reassigned to be the Inspector of Jing Province. Cao Shuang secretly instructed him to check if Sima Yi was as ill as he claimed, so Li Sheng visited Sima Yi before leaving for Jing Province. Sima Yi knew the true purpose of Li Sheng's visit, so he pretended to be frail and feeble. Li Sheng saw that Sima Yi could not move around and wear clothes without help from his servants, and could not even consume congee without soiling his clothes. He then told Sima Yi, "Everyone thought that your illness was a minor one; alas, who expected you to be in such poor health?" Sima Yi pretended to cough and pant as he replied, "I'm old and sick and I'm going to die soon. When you go to Bing Province, you should be careful because it is near barbarian territory. We might not see each other again, so I entrust my sons Shi and Zhao to your care." Li Sheng said, "I'm returning to my home province, not Bing Province." Sima Yi pretended to mishear and he said, "You're going to Bing Province, aren't you?" Li Sheng then said, "My home province is Jing Province." Sima Yi replied, "I'm so old and weak that I can't even hear you. So now you're going back to your home province. It's time for you to make some glorious achievements!" Li Sheng returned to Cao Shuang and told him, "Sima Yi is dying soon and no longer of sound mind. There's nothing for you to worry about." Later, he said, "It's sad to see that the Grand Tutor is no longer in a good state of health to serve." Cao Shuang lowered his guard against Sima Yi.

== The coup d'état (Note: The sequence of events as indicated in the wiki is mostly derived from Sima Yi's biography in Jin Shu; in Sanguozhi, the coup is recorded mainly in Cao Shuang's biography, with Pei Songzhi providing additional information via his annotations. Vol.75 of Zizhi Tongjian also recorded the event.) ==
On 5 February 249, Cao Shuang and his brothers accompanied the emperor Cao Fang on a visit to the Gaoping Tombs (高平陵) to pay respect to the late emperor and Cao Fang's adoptive father, Cao Rui. On that day, Sima Yi seized the opportunity to stage a coup d'état against his co-regent. He went to Yongning Palace to meet Empress Dowager Guo and ask her to remove Cao Shuang and his brothers from power. In the meantime, he ordered his eldest son Sima Shi to lead his troops to the palace gates. (Note: According to vol.01 (Sima Yi's biography) of Book of Jin, Sima Shi was in the post of Military Protector of the Palace (中护军) at the time of the coup. According to Sima Shi's biography in the same work, before the coup, he had been secretly maintaining a force of about 3000 men. For the coup, he managed to gather them within a single morning, and no one knew where they came from. Probably of note was that the position of Agriculture General of the Household of Luoyang (洛陽典農中郎將) was first held by his brother Sima Zhao and then by his cousin Sima Wang. As the position was also in charge of the tuntian system around the capital, this could have been one of the sources from which the 3000 were drawn from. Also, as Military Protector of the Palace, Sima Shi was noted for his objectiveness and impartiality. The troops who were dismissed due to his "impartiality" could have been another source of manpower.) After meeting the empress dowager, Sima Yi went to the camp where Cao Shuang's troops were based. Yan Shi (嚴世), one of Cao Shuang's subordinates, prepared to fire an arrow at Sima Yi but his colleague Sun Qian (孫謙) stopped him and said, "We wouldn't know what will happen." This process repeated three times. (Note: According to Sima Fu's biography in Jin Shu, he joined Sima Shi at the palace gates, and was later rewarded for his efforts. However, vol.75 of Zizhi Tongjian did not record that Fu was involved in the coup; it did record that Sima Zhao was involved in the plotting.)

Huan Fan, the Minister of Finance (大司農) and one of Cao Shuang's supporters, managed to escape from Luoyang and head to the Gaoping Tombs. When Jiang Ji, the Grand Commandant (太尉), told Sima Yi that the "bag of wisdom" (Note: Huan Fan's nickname) was gone, Sima Yi replied that they did not need to worry because he knew that Cao Shuang would not heed Huan Fan's advice. Sima Yi then granted imperial authority to Gao Rou, the Minister over the Masses (司徒), appointed him as acting General-in-Chief (大將軍), and ordered him to take command of Cao Shuang's troops. He also told Gao Rou, "You're now like Zhou Bo (Note: Sima Yi was alluding to Zhou Bo's role in the massacre of Empress Lü's clan after her death. However, the comparison was not apt as unlike the Lü clan, who were consort kin, Cao Shuang and his brothers were part of the imperial clan.)." He also appointed Wang Guan, the Minister Coachman (太僕), as acting Commandant of the Central Army (中領軍) and ordered him to seize command of the troops under Cao Shuang's brother Cao Xi (曹羲).

Sima Yi, along with Jiang Ji and others, led troops out of Luoyang to the floating bridge above the Luo River, where he sent a memorial to the emperor Cao Fang, listing out Cao Shuang's crimes (Note: e.g. not fulfilling his duty as regent, corrupting the government, conspiring against the throne) and requesting the emperor to remove Cao Shuang and his brothers from their positions of power. Cao Shuang blocked the memorial from reaching Cao Fang and left the emperor at the south of the Yi River while ordering his men to cut down trees to build anti-cavalry blockades and station about 1,000 troops nearby to guard against Sima Yi's advances. During this time, Huan Fan advised Cao Shuang to bring the emperor to Xuchang, denounce Sima Yi as a traitor, and call on all military forces throughout Wei to attack Sima Yi. Cao Shuang refused to listen to Huan Fan, and that night he sent Xu Yun (許允) and Chen Tai to meet Sima Yi. Sima Yi explained to them he only wanted Cao Shuang to surrender and give up his powers. He also sent Yin Damu (尹大目), whom Cao Shuang highly trusted, to further persuade Cao Shuang to surrender. When Cao Shuang wanted to agree, Huan Fan attempted to stop him but Cao Shuang ultimately did not heed his advice. Cao Shuang said, "Sima Yi only wants to take away my powers. I can still return home as a marquis and live in luxury and comfort." Huan Fan could only sigh and thump his chest in frustration. Cao Shuang then let Cao Fang read Sima Yi's memorial and agreed to surrender and relinquish his powers.

== Aftermath ==
After returning to Luoyang, on 9 February 249, (Note: Cao Fang's biography in the Sanguozhi recorded that Cao Shuang and his associates – Ding Mi (丁謐), Deng Yang, He Yan, Bi Gui, Li Sheng and Huan Fan – were executed along with their extended families on the wuxu day of the 1st month of the 1st year of the Jiaping era of Cao Fang's reign. This date corresponds to 9 February 249 in the Gregorian calendar; it was also 4 days after the coup.) Cao Shuang was charged with plotting treason with the palace eunuch Zhang Dang (張當) and his associates He Yan, Ding Mi, Deng Yang, Bi Gui and Li Sheng. They were executed on the same day along with the rest of their families and relatives. Jiang Ji had attempted to persuade Sima Yi to spare Cao Shuang and his brothers in consideration of the meritorious service rendered by their father Cao Zhen, but Sima Yi refused. Lu Zhi (魯芝) and Yang Zong (楊綜), two of Cao Shuang's subordinates, had previously tried to stop Cao Shuang from surrendering to Sima Yi. After Cao Shuang was arrested, Lu Zhi and Yang Zong were also implicated and arrested as well. However, Sima Yi pardoned and released them. (Note: According to Lu Zhi's biography in Jin Shu, he was spared by Sima Yi as he had neither tried to justify his actions nor begged to be spared. Lu continued to serve Cao Wei and its successor the Jin dynasty; he died in 273 at the age of 84 (by East Asian reckoning).) (Note: During the coup, Lu Zhi asked Xin Pi's son Xin Chang to follow him. After listening to advice from his elder sister Xin Xianying, Xin Chang was also unharmed.)

Earlier on, when Huan Fan escaped from Luoyang to join Cao Shuang at the Gaoping Tombs, he met Si Fan (司蕃), who was guarding the Changping Gate. As Si Fan used to serve under Huan Fan, he trusted Huan Fan and allowed him to pass through. Once he was out of Luoyang, Huan Fan turned back and told Si Fan, "The Imperial Tutor (Sima Yi) is planning to commit treason. You should come with me!" Si Fan followed Huan Fan but could not keep up so he gave up and retreated. After the coup d'état, Si Fan surrendered himself to Sima Yi and told him what happened earlier. Sima Yi asked, "What's the punishment for falsely accusing someone of treason?" "According to the law, the one who makes the false accusation shall be punished for treason," came the reply. Huan Fan was then executed along with the rest of his family. Cao Shuang, his family, and his supporters were executed.

According to the Chronicles of the Clans of Wei, Sima Yi assigned He Yan the task of presiding as a judge in the trial of Cao Shuang. He Yan, who wanted to be acquitted, judged Cao Shuang very harshly in order to gain Sima Yi's favour, but Sima Yi added He Yan's name to the list of criminals to be executed at the last moment. (Note: Sima Guang was skeptical of Sun Sheng's account as Sima Yi had just taken down Cao Shuang and his partisans; there was no reason to put He Yan in charge of the investigations. Even if there was such an order, there was no reason why He Yan would expect himself to be spared when he had been so closely associated with Cao Shuang before the coup.)

In March 249, Cao Fang appointed Sima Yi as Imperial Chancellor (丞相), increased the size of Sima Yi's marquisate and awarded him additional privileges. However, Sima Yi declined the appointment of Imperial Chancellor. In January or February 250, when Cao Fang granted him the nine bestowments, he refused to accept again. In February or March 250, Cao Fang had an ancestral shrine built for the Sima family in Luoyang, increased the size of Sima Yi's personal staff, promoted some of Sima Yi's personal staff, and enfeoffed Sima Yi's sons Sima Rong (司馬肜) and Sima Lun as village marquises.

In 251, Wang Ling and his nephew Linghu Yu (令狐愚) plotted a rebellion in Shouchun aimed at overthrowing Sima Yi and replacing Cao Fang with Cao Biao. Sima Yi knew that Wang Ling was plotting a rebellion and showed up near Wang Ling's base before Wang Ling could do anything. Wang Ling surrendered and committed suicide later while he was being escorted as a prisoner to Luoyang. Sima Yi had Wang Ling's co-conspirators, including Cao Biao, arrested and executed along with their families.

After Sima Yi's death on 7 September 251, his sons Sima Shi and Sima Zhao continued to control the Wei government and eliminate any form of political opposition. The Cao family's influence in Wei weakened over time as the Sima family's became stronger. In February 266, Sima Zhao's son, Sima Yan, usurped the throne from Cao Huan and replaced the Cao Wei state with the Jin dynasty, with himself as the new emperor.

== In popular culture ==
In the seventh installment of Koei's Dynasty Warriors video game series, a stage is dedicated to the initial coup d'état against Cao Shuang, while the other two are mentioned in the narration. Cao Fang's visit to the tombs is not mentioned in the game; instead, he is mentioned to be on a hunting trip with Cao Shuang.

== See also ==
- Three Rebellions in Shouchun
