= Cao Shuang =

Chinese general and Cao Wei regent (died 249)

- 曹爽

Manager of the Affairs of the Masters of Writing (錄尚書事)
- In office ? – 5 February 249
- Monarch: Cao Fang

General-in-Chief (大將軍)
- In office 19 January 239 – 5 February 249
- Monarch: Cao Rui / Cao Fang
- Preceded by: Cao Yu

General of the Military Guards (武衛將軍)
- In office ? – 19 January 239
- Monarch: Cao Rui

Personal details
- Born: Unknown
- Died: 9 February 249 (Note: Cao Fang's biography in the Sanguozhi recorded that Cao Shuang and his associates – Ding Mi (丁謐), Deng Yang, He Yan, Bi Gui, Li Sheng and Huan Fan – were executed along with their extended families on the wuxu day of the 1st month of the 1st year of the Jiaping era of Cao Fang's reign. This date corresponds to 9 February 249 in the Gregorian calendar.) Luoyang, Henan
- Parent: Cao Zhen (father)
- Relatives: Cao Xi (brother); Cao Xun (brother); Cao Ze (brother); Cao Yan (brother); Cao Ai (brother); Xiahou Shang's wife (aunt); Xiahou Xuan (cousin); Xiahou Hui (cousin)
- Occupation: Military general, regent
- Courtesy name: Zhaobo (昭伯)
- Peerage: Marquis of Wu'an (武安侯) (Note: This was Cao Shuang's peerage during Cao Fang's reign. (明帝崩，齐王即位，加爽侍中，改封武安侯...) Sanguozhi, vol.09.)

Cao Shuang (died 9 February 249), courtesy name Zhaobo, was a Chinese military general and regent of the state of Cao Wei during the Three Kingdoms period of China. He was the eldest son of Cao Zhen, a prominent general of Cao Wei. He initially held great power in Cao Wei as General-in-Chief but later lost his power to Sima Yi in the Incident at the Gaoping Tombs and was executed on charges of treason.

== Life ==
It is unknown when Cao Shuang was born. When young, he was considered prudent and steady among the Cao clansmen. When Cao Rui was still his father's heir, he favored Cao Shuang greatly. After ascending the throne in June 226, Cao Rui bestowed upon Shuang several titles of increasing seniority and prestige over his reign. When Shuang's father Cao Zhen died in 231, Shuang inherited his father's peerage and marquisate as the Marquis of Shaoling (邵陵侯).

Around 239, when the Wei emperor Cao Rui became critically ill, he resolved to pass the throne to his adopted son, Cao Fang. He initially wanted to entrust Cao Fang to his uncle Cao Yu, to serve as the lead regent, along with Xiahou Xian (夏侯獻), Cao Shuang, Cao Zhao (曹肇; son of Cao Xiu) and Qin Lang. However, his trusted officials Liu Fang (劉放) and Sun Zi (孫資), who were unfriendly with Xiahou Xian and Cao Zhao, became apprehensive upon hearing that Cao Rui wanted to appoint them as regents. They managed to persuade the dying emperor to appoint Cao Shuang (with whom they were friendly) and Sima Yi (who was then with his troops at Ji County (汲縣; in present-day Xinxiang, Henan) as the regents instead. Cao Yu, Cao Zhao and Qin Lang were excluded from the regency. As a result, Cao Shuang came to power in the final days of Cao Rui's reign. However, Cao Shuang was clearly inadequate for the important task assigned to him. When Cao Rui asked if he was competent enough, Cao Shuang was so nervous that he was unable to speak, so Liu Fang stepped on his foot and whispered into his ear, urging him to say: "I will serve the dynasty to my death."

Despite his inability, Cao Shuang and his brothers, Cao Xi (曹羲) and Cao Xun (曹訓), wielded great power in Wei. He was also often at odds with his co-regent Sima Yi, who had greater influence and support. In 243, Sima Yi's position was further strengthened by another successful deployment: Zhuge Ke, a general of Wei's rival state, Eastern Wu, was constantly sending agents to Shouchun (壽春; around present-day Shou County, Anhui) to prepare an invasion, so Sima Yi led Wei forces to Shu County (舒縣), Lujiang Commandery (盧江郡) near the Wei–Wu border. Upon hearing the news, the Wu emperor Sun Quan immediately ordered Zhuge Ke to withdraw to Chaisang (柴桑), Yuzhang Commandery (豫章郡). Sima Yi's popularity and influence instantly multiplied as he was cheered as being able to scare away the enemy numbering over 100,000 without a fight and thus secured the border and saved Shouchun from certain attack. Cao Shuang, feeling insecure over Sima Yi's triumph, managed to persuade the emperor Cao Fang to promote Sima Yi to the position of Grand Tutor (太傅). While it was ostensibly a promotion for Sima Yi, the position of Grand Tutor was in fact an honorary one without any real authority over military affairs.

Cao Shuang was desperate for a victory to boost his own fame so he selected Shu Han, Wei's other rival state, as his target. Leading an army numbering over 100,000 troops, Cao Shuang invaded Shu territory in March 244. However, two months later, he lost to Shu forces led by Wang Ping and Fei Yi at the Battle of Xingshi and barely escaped back to Chang'an. Cao Shuang's popularity and influence dropped to a new low after his defeat. At the same time, Sima Yi's popularity and influence further increased due to his opposition to the campaign from the start. Potentially to deceive Cao Shuang into letting down his guard, Sima Yi stopped engaging in any political activity in May 247 and retired on the grounds of illness. He went on further to pretend to be ill and senile. In the same year, Cao Shuang followed the advice of Li Sheng, Deng Yang and Ding Mi in order to maintain his power. (Note: According to some sources, Cao Shuang moved Empress Dowager Guo to Yongning Palace, effectively keeping her under house arrest and away from the young emperor Cao Fang. However, historians such as Hu Sanxing and Wang Maohong doubted this, as the Sanguozhi said that Empress Dowager Guo had lived in Yongning Palace since the ascension of Cao Fang, so there would be no move for her, and such sources might be fabricated by Jin dynasty historians to cast Cao Shuang in a more unfavourable light for "abducting the empress dowager".)

In the winter of 248, Cao Shuang's protégé, Li Sheng, was appointed as the Inspector of Jing Province by the Wei imperial court. Before he left Luoyang to assume office in Jing Province, Cao Shuang sent him to check on Sima Yi. Cao Shuang and his followers overjoyed when Li Sheng reported that Sima Yi was indeed ill and that he could not even hear what Li Sheng said. According to Li Sheng, Sima Yi misheard "Jing Province" as "Bing Province". Cao Shuang sensed that Sima Yi no longer posed a threat to him and started to lower his guard against the latter.

On 5 February 249, Cao Shuang and his two brothers, Cao Xi (曹羲) and Cao Xun (曹訓), left the imperial capital Luoyang to accompany the emperor Cao Fang to pay respects to his ancestors at the Gaoping Tombs (高平陵). After that, they proceeded to go on a hunting expedition outside Luoyang.

== Execution ==
Sima Yi and his sons seized the opportunity to launch a coup d'état and take command of the military forces stationed in Luoyang. Sima Yi first sent his supporters to take control of the positions held by Cao Shuang and his brothers: Gao Rou replaced Cao Shuang as Minister over the Masses (司徒); Wang Guan (王觀) replaced Cao Xi as Minister Coachman (太僕). Sima Yi then went to see Empress Dowager Guo and coerce her into issuing an imperial order for the arrest of Cao Shuang and his brothers under charges of treason.

Huan Fan, one of Cao Shuang's advisers, managed to escape from Luoyang with the official seal of General-in-Chief and bring it to Cao Shuang. As his family members were being held hostage in Luoyang, Cao Shuang entered a dilemma on whether he should surrender to Sima Yi or not. However, after Sima Yi promised him that he and his family would not be harmed, Cao Shuang surrendered and relinquished his power to Sima Yi. On 9 February 249, Cao Shuang's fate was sealed. After gaining power, Sima Yi broke his promise, had Cao Shuang and his family arrested and put to death on charges of treason.

== See also ==
- Lists of people of the Three Kingdoms
