= Memorial to the throne =

Petition to the Emperor of China

A memorial to the throne (Chinese: 章表; pinyin: zhāngbiǎo) was an official communication to the emperor of China. They were generally careful essays in Classical Chinese and their presentation was a formal affair directed by government officials. Submission of a memorial was a right theoretically available to everyone from the crown prince to a common farmer, but the court secretaries would read them aloud to the emperor and exercised considerable control over what was considered worthy of his time. They were used in imperial China as a means of regulating corrupt local officials who might otherwise have escaped oversight.

== Han dynasty ==
Under the Han dynasty, generally, the reception of memorials was the responsibility of the Imperial Secretary tasked with overseeing provincial administration. He was generally required to present any formal memorials, but could reject them for improper formatting. Masters of Writing under the Minister Steward then copied and processed these prior to submission to the emperor. Under Emperor An, however, Zhang Heng was placed in charge of reception of the memorials as part of his post as Prefect of the Majors for Official Carriages under the Ministry of Guards.

== Ming dynasty ==
During the early Ming dynasty, an Office of Report Inspection was established in AD 1370.

In AD 1375, Ru Taisu, a bureau secretary of the Ministry of Justice, was flogged by the Hongwu Emperor for two harsh comments of his 17,000-character memorial. At the time he was summoned for his punishment, however, the emperor had only gotten to the 16,370th one. Having the remainder read aloud the next day while in bed, the emperor instituted four of Ru's proposals and praised the last 500 characters as a model memorial for all future submissions. Hongwu admitted he had erred in getting angry, but blamed the victim for having forced him to listen to thousands of words before getting to the substance of his request.

Two years later in August 1377, the Hongwu Emperor disbanded the existing Office of Report Inspection and created an Office of Transmission (通政司, Tōngzhèngsī). By the height of the Ming dynasty, codes and statutes had been drawn up specifying the style and diction appropriate for each level of official concerning each type of problem. When petitions arrived in the imperial capital, multiple copies were made of the original by the Office of Transmission. The copies would be filed with the archives at the Office of Supervising Secretaries and the original sent to the emperor. Criminal codes specified punishments for mistranscriptions or violations of the imperial naming taboo.

Replies varied from Ru's flogging in the Hongwu Emperor's presence to personal replies both handwritten and dictated. Most often, emperors or their secretaries would annotate the memorials with vermillion ink, whether "forward to the proper ministry", "noted", or a series of circles. These functioned as checkmarks, indicating that he had read the petition.

== Qing dynasty ==
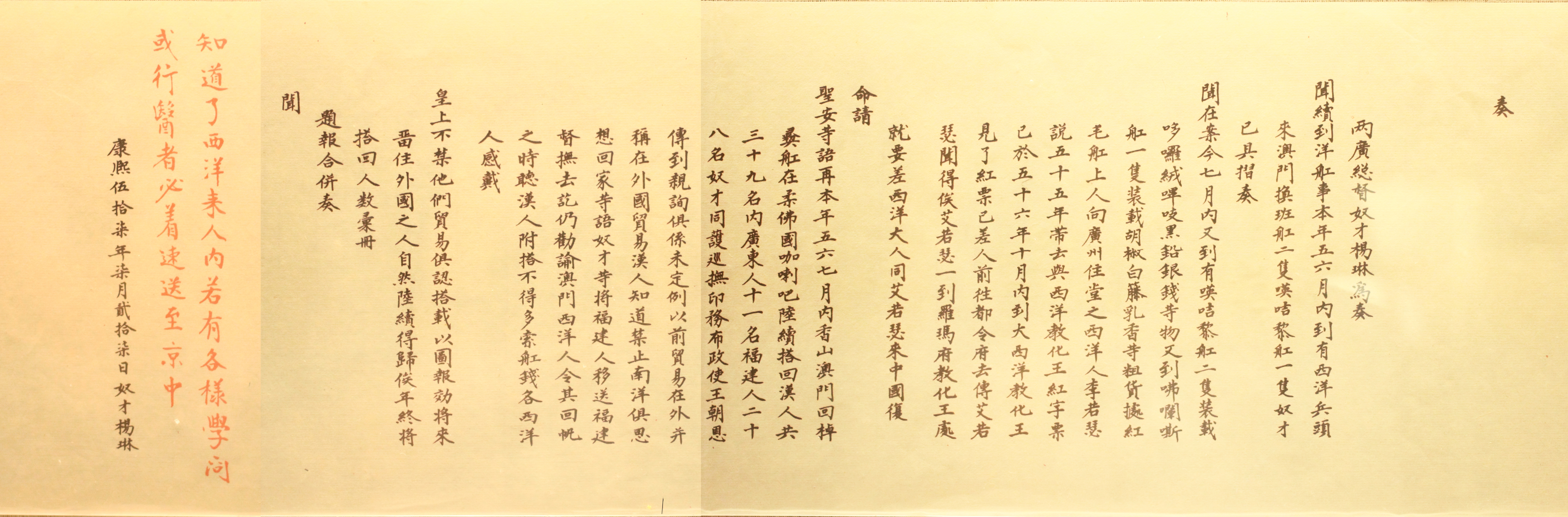
Memorial to the Kangxi Emperor from the Viceroy of Liangguang about the Thirteen Factories in Guangzhou, with imperial reply in red (1719)

Under the Qing dynasty, memorials were received constantly, detailing personnel evaluations, crop reports, local prices, weather predictions, and local gossip at the national, provincial, and county levels. Memorials were delivered by the imperial courier network and copied, summarized, and entered into official registers by the clerks of the Grand Secretariat.

Because this great (largely Han Chinese) bureaucracy might interrupt, conceal, or lose information important to their Manchu rulers, the Kangxi Emperor developed a supplemental system of "Palace Memorials" (Chinese: 奏摺; pinyin: zòuzhé; lit. 'Memorial Fold') in the late 17th century. This system delivered local officials' memorials to him directly and, under various forms, it continued to be practiced by his successors. A "Folding Memorial", for instance, was to be written on pages small enough for the emperor to hold them in his hand and read without being observed. The Yongzheng Emperor was particularly partial to the informal system, which allowed him brevity, celerity, and honesty.

== See also ==
- Official Communications of the Chinese Empire

Prominent memorials

- Great Rites Controversy
- Rebellion of Cao Qin
- Tien Gow
- Fu Youyi
- Yang Jisheng
- Imperial examination
