= Wang Ling's Rebellion =

Uprising by Cao Wei general Wang Ling against the regent Sima Yi (251)

- Part of the Three Rebellions in Shouchun
Date	7–15 June 251 (Note: Cao Fang's biography in the Sanguozhi recorded that Sima Yi led troops to attack Wang Ling on the bingwu day of the 5th month of the 3rd year of the Jiaping era, and that Wang Ling committed suicide on the jiayin day in the same month. These dates correspond to 7 June 251 and 15 June 251 in the Gregorian calendar.)
Location	Shouchun (present-day Shou County, Anhui), China
Result	Wang Ling surrendered

Belligerents
Cao Wei	Wang Ling

Commanders and leaders
Sima Yi	Wang Ling (surrendered)

Wang Ling's Rebellion (Chinese: 王凌之亂), or the First Rebellion in Shouchun, was a punitive uprising in 251 led by Wang Ling, a general of the state of Cao Wei, against the regent Sima Yi and his clan. This was the first of a series of three rebellions that all took place in Shouchun (壽春; present-day Shou County, Lu'an, Anhui) in the 250s during the Three Kingdoms period in Chinese history.

== Background ==
Like each of the Three Rebellions in Shouchun, the cause of the revolt was related to the Incident at the Gaoping Tombs in February 249, in which the Wei regent Sima Yi and his clan seized power from his co-regent Cao Shuang and dominated the Wei government. Wang Ling, an influential governor and general in Wei, was appointed "General Who Attacks the East" (征東將軍) and placed in charge of military affairs in Yang Province. In 241, Quan Cong, a general from Wei's rival state Eastern Wu, led thousands of troops to attack a Wei embankment at Quebei (芍陂). Wang Ling led an army to counter the invaders and drove them away after several days of fighting. For his efforts, Wang Ling was promoted to "General of Chariots and Cavalry" (車騎將軍), enfeoffed as the "Marquis of Nan District" (南鄉侯), and had the number of taxable households in his marquisate increased to 1,350.

== Trigger ==
Around the time, Wang Ling's maternal nephew, Linghu Yu (令狐愚), was appointed as the Inspector of Yan Province for his contributions and was stationed at Ping'e County (平阿縣). Both of them wielded significant military power in the Huainan region. Wang Ling was subsequently appointed as Minister of Works. After Sima Yi eliminated Cao Shuang and his clan in the Incident at the Gaoping Tombs in February 249, Wang Ling was reassigned to the position of Grand Commandant (太尉) and given a ceremonial axe to represent his authority. After discussing with Linghu Yu, Wang Ling felt that the Wei emperor Cao Fang was inept and plotted with his nephew to replace the emperor with Cao Biao, the Prince of Chu, and establish the new capital in Xuchang.

Between late September and October 249, Linghu Yu sent his subordinate Zhang Shi (張式) to Boma (白馬) to contact Cao Biao. Wang Ling also sent someone to Luoyang to inform his son, Wang Guang (王廣), about the plot. Wang Guang advised his father against the idea, saying, "The act of changing the ruler is a cause for disaster." Xi Zuochi mentioned in the Han Jin Chunqiu (漢晉春秋) that Wang Guang wrote a long reply to his father, stating that Cao Shuang fell from power because he lost the people's support and that Sima Yi's policies were more popular, hence it was difficult to overthrow the Sima clan. Pei Songzhi claimed that Xi Zuochi fabricated this account because the tone and writing style of Wang Guang's reply was different from that in earlier records.

== Rebellion ==
Between late December 249 and January 250, Linghu Yu sent Zhang Shi to contact Cao Biao again but died of illness before Zhang Shi returned. In early 250, a glitter was observed in the South Dipper constellation. Wang Ling said, "When there is a star in the Dipper, someone will make a sudden big fortune." The Weilüe mentioned that Wang Ling asked others about the meaning of the stars, and they, in their attempt to please him, lied that the stars were a sign that a ruler will rise. Wang Ling then affirmed his plan to rebel.

In the spring of 251, when Wu forces approached Tushui (塗水), Wang Ling requested permission from the Wei imperial court to lead his forces to engage the enemy. His true intention, however, was to use the attack to mask his plans for rebellion. Sima Yi sensed that there was something fishy in Wang Ling's request and ignored it. Wang Ling then sent Yang Hong (楊弘) to inform Huang Hua (黃華), the Inspector of Yan Province, about his plan, but Yang and Huang betrayed him and reported his plot to Sima Yi. Sima Yi received intelligence on Wang Ling's plot on or before 7 June 251.

Sima Yi immediately mobilised troops to attack Wang Ling and they travelled on water. He first issued a pardon to Wang Ling and sent a secretary to call for Wang's surrender, while his army advanced to within 100 chi of Wang's base to put pressure on Wang. Wang Ling knew that his forces were too weak so he gave up, sent his subordinate Wang Yu (王彧) to apologise on his behalf, and hand over his official seal and ceremonial axe to Sima Yi. The Weilüe contained detailed records of two apology letters written by Wang Ling to Sima Yi.

When Sima Yi's army reached Qiutou (丘頭), Wang Ling tied himself up to show his repentance. Acting on imperial order, Sima Yi sent a Registrar (主簿) to unbind Wang and reassure him and return him his official seal and ceremonial axe. Wang Ling later had a conversation with Sima Yi at a distance of more than ten zhang between them. Wang Ling knew that he had committed a capital offence, so he wanted to test whether Sima Yi was sincere about sparing him. He asked for a coffin and was given one by Sima Yi. Sima Yi then sent 600 men to escort Wang Ling back to the capital Luoyang. However, on 15 June 251, before he reached his destination, Wang Ling committed suicide at Xiang County (項縣) by consuming poison. The Weilüe mentioned that before he killed himself, Wang Ling exclaimed, "I've lived for 80 years. My reputation is destroyed just like that!" Gan Bao's Jin Ji (晉紀) stated that before committing suicide at Xiang county, Wang Ling passed by a shrine honouring Jia Kui and said: "Jia Liangdao, only the gods know Wang Ling is truly loyal to Wei."

The Wei imperial court ordered Cao Biao to commit suicide in July 251. His subordinates who conspired with him were executed along with their families. Wang Ling and Linghu Yu's bodies were exhumed from their graves and exposed to the public for three days in a nearby city, while their official seals and court dresses were burnt and buried.

== Aftermath ==
As a result of this uprising, it occurred to many Wei officials that Sima Yi and his clan were serious about affairs, most likely because the Wei court was seen as being divided into those supported the Simas and those who were still loyal to the Cao imperial family. The revolt also had a strong influence on the subsequent second and third rebellions in Shouchun, as they were all inspired by the same cause, which was to unseat the Simas and restore the monarchy.

During the revolt, Sima Yi, who was feigning illness before the Incident at the Gaoping Tombs, became drastically ill and died in September 251. (Note: Gan Bao's Jin Ji recorded that Sima Yi's illness grew severe after he dreamt of Wang Ling's and Jia Kui's ghosts haunting him.) His power was passed on to his eldest son, Sima Shi, who immediately faced an assassination attempt and the second rebellion in Shouchun.

The revolt, along with the Incident at the Gaoping Tombs, is often considered a turning point in the decline of Wei and the mark of the beginning of the rise of the Sima clan. Sima Yi's grandson, Sima Yan, eventually ended the Wei regime in February 266, and unified the Three Kingdoms under the Jin dynasty in May 280.

== Order of battle ==
Wang Ling's forces

- (surrendered) Wang Ling
  - (surrendered) Wang Yu (王彧)
- Cao Biao, Prince of Chu
- Linghu Yu (令狐愚)
  - Zhang Shi (張式)

Wei forces

- Sima Yi

== In popular culture ==
The rebellion, along with the other two uprisings, are all featured as playable stages in the Jin Story Mode in the seventh instalment of Koei's Dynasty Warriors video game series. During the stage, the player plays as Sima Yi, and has to plot with Wang Ling's son Wang Guang, who chose to remain in Wei to convince his father Wang Ling to "clear his mind from the chaos". During the stage, Eastern Wu's Zhuge Ke also makes it to the battle to support Wang Ling, even though in history he never did.

== See also ==
- Three Rebellions in Shouchun
- Punitive war
