= Zhongda =

Zhongda may refer to:

- Zhongda, the style name of Sima Yi, Cao Wei's general during China's Three Kingdoms period
- Zhongda Township (仲达乡, Zhòngdáxiāng) in Yushu County, Qinghai, in China
- National Central University (國立中央大學, Guólì Zhōngyāng Dàxué), abbreviated as "Zhongda" in Mandarin Chinese
- Sun Yat-sen University (中山大学, Zhōngshān Dàxué), abbreviated as "Zhongda" in Chinese
