= Man Chong =

Cao Wei general and official (died 242)

- 滿寵

Grand Commandant (太尉)
- In office March or April 239 – between 17 April and 16 May 242
- Monarch: Cao Fang
- Preceded by: Sima Yi
- Succeeded by: Jiang Ji

General Who Attacks the East (征東將軍)
- In office 230 – March or April 239
- Monarch: Cao Rui / Cao Fang

Inspector of Yu Province (豫州刺史)
- In office 228–238
- Monarch: Cao Rui

General of the Vanguard (前將軍)
- In office 224–228
- Monarch: Cao Pi

General Who Calms the Waves (伏波將軍)
- In office ?–224
- Monarch: Cao Pi

General Who Spreads Martial Might (揚武將軍)
- In office 220–?
- Monarch: Cao Pi

Administrator of Runan (汝南太守)
- In office 209–220
- Monarch: Emperor Xian of Han
- Chancellor: Cao Cao
- In office 200–208
- Monarch: Emperor Xian of Han

General of Vehement Might (奮威將軍) (acting)
- In office 208–209
- Monarch: Emperor Xian of Han
- Chancellor: Cao Cao

Prefect of Xu (許令) (under Cao Cao)
- In office 196–200
- Monarch: Emperor Xian of Han

Personal details
- Born: Before 175 Jinxiang County, Shandong
- Died: April or May 242 (Note: Cao Fang's biography in the Sanguozhi recorded that Man Chong died in the 3rd month of the 3rd year of the Zhengshi era in Cao Fang's reign. This month corresponds to 17 April to 16 May 242 in the Gregorian calendar.)
- Children: Man Wei; Man Bing; Sima Gan's wife; one unnamed son
- Occupation: Military general, politician
- Courtesy name: Boning (伯寧)
- Posthumous name: Marquis Jing (景侯)
- Peerage: Marquis of Changyi (昌邑侯)

Man Chong (before 175 – April or May 242), courtesy name Boning, was a Chinese military general and politician of the state of Cao Wei during the Three Kingdoms period of China. He previously served under the warlord Cao Cao during the late Eastern Han dynasty. He is best known for defending the city of Hefei from a series of invasions by Wei's rival state, Eastern Wu, between 230 and 235.

== Early life and career ==
Man Chong was from Changyi County (昌邑縣), Shanyang Commandery (山陽郡), which is located northwest of present-day Jinxiang County, Shandong. When he was 17, he served as an Investigator (督郵) (Note: A duyou (督郵; variously translated as "Investigator" or "Inspector") was an official representative of the Administrator (太守), the highest-ranked administrative officer in a commandery. His role was to patrol the counties in the commandery and audit/review the county-level officials' work.) in his home commandery. At the time, there was a group of armed thugs led by Li Shuo (李朔) who were causing harm to the locals. After the commandery administrator put Man Chong in charge of dealing with them, Li Shuo surrendered to the authorities and never caused trouble again.

As Man Chong grew older, he became the Prefect (令) of Gaoping County (高平縣; northwest of present-day Weishan County, Shandong). Around the time, an official Zhang Bao (張苞) was abusing his powers by soliciting bribes and causing trouble for the local administration. One day, Man Chong led his guards into the guesthouse where Zhang Bao stayed and arrested him on allegations of corruption. After interrogating Zhang Bao and publishing his crimes, Man Chong resigned and went home with his part in the process completed.

== Service under Cao Cao ==
=== As the Prefect of Xu County ===
When the warlord Cao Cao held the position of Governor of Yan Province between 191 and 192, he recruited Man Chong to serve as an Assistant Officer (從事) under him. Later, when Cao Cao had taken control of the Han court and was briefly General-in-Chief in 196, he appointed Man Chong as an Assistant in the West Bureau (西曹屬) of his administration. Man Chong was later appointed as the Prefect of Xu County (許縣; present-day Xuchang, Henan), the new imperial capital of the Eastern Han dynasty between 196 and 220. This was a politically sensitive appointment given Cao Cao's relatively new grip on the court and Man Chong, not yet thirty, was fairly young for such an important post. During his tenure, Man Chong got into two controversial incidents.

In the first incident, Cao Hong, one of Cao Cao's cousins and trusted generals, had some retainers under him who broke the law while they were in Xu County. After Man Chong arrested and imprisoned the retainers, Cao Hong wrote to him and asked him to release them. When Man Chong ignored his request, Cao Hong brought up the issue to Cao Cao, who summoned the official in charge to come and see him. Man Chong thought that Cao Cao wanted to pardon Cao Hong's retainers, so he immediately executed them. Cao Cao was pleased when he heard about it and he remarked, "Isn't this what an officeholder should do?"

In the second incident, Yang Biao (楊彪), the Grand Commandant and long serving member of the Han court, was arrested and imprisoned for allegedly conspiring with Yuan Shu, (Note: On a personal level, Yang Biao was also Yuan Shu's brother-in-law; Yang Xiu's biography in Book of the Later Han indicated that he was Yuan Shu's nephew.) a warlord who rebelled against the Eastern Han dynasty. Man Chong, who was in charge of interrogating Yang Biao, received requests from his colleagues Xun Yu and Kong Rong to refrain from flogging the well-regarded scholar Yang Biao during the interrogation. However, Man Chong ignored them and did everything by the book. A few days later, Man Chong reported to Cao Cao: "Yang Biao had nothing to say when I interrogated him. Before executing a criminal, we must first produce evidence of his guilt and show it to the public. Yang Biao is a reputable man. If we execute him without sufficient evidence to show that he is guilty, the people will lose faith in us. I hope you will reconsider your decision carefully and not be too hasty in ordering Yang Biao's execution." Cao Cao then released Yang Biao. Xun Yu and Kong Rong were initially angry with Man Chong when they found out that he tortured Yang Biao during the interrogation. However, they became more amiable towards him after they heard what he told Cao Cao.

The historian Pei Songzhi criticised Man Chong for his cruelty and said that he should not have tortured Yang Biao, who had a reputation for being virtuous. From his viewpoint, even though Man Chong deserved praise for doing things by the book, it was not enough to make up for his cruelty.

=== As the Administrator of Runan Commandery ===
In 200 CE, the Battle of Guandu broke out between Cao Cao and his rival, Yuan Shao, whose family homeome during the Later Han was in Runan Commandery (汝南郡; covering parts of present-day southeastern Henan and northwestern Anhui). Although Yuan Shao had no control in Runan Commandery, he maintained some influence there through his retainers, who led small groups of armed men and had strongholds scattered throughout the commandery. Cao Cao was worried that they would pose a threat to his base in Xu County while he was away at the frontline at Guandu, so he appointed Man Chong as the Administrator (太守) of Runan Commandery to deal with Yuan Shao's retainers.

Upon assuming office, Man Chong gathered five hundred followers to attack and destroy over 20 strongholds, then invited the retainer leaders to a diplomatic meeting and there killed over 10 of them. Runan Commandery was no longer a major threat but the harsh treatment did lead to repeated revolts in the area. During his tenure, Man Chong gained control over 20,000 households, drafted about 2,000 men into military service, and implemented the tuntian policy in the commandery.

In 208, Man Chong led his troops from Runan Commandery to join Cao Cao on a military campaign to conquer Jing Province and attack the rival warlords Sun Quan and Liu Bei. After Cao Cao retreated back to the north following his defeat at the Battle of Red Cliffs in the winter of 208–209, he appointed Man Chong as acting General of Vehement Might (奮威將軍) and ordered him to remain behind in Jing Province to defend Dangyang. However, after Cao Cao's forces lost the Battle of Jiangling against Sun Quan's forces, Cao Cao ordered Man Chong to abandon Dangyang and return to his previous post in Runan Commandery. The Han imperial court awarded Man Chong the title of a Secondary Marquis (關內侯).

=== Battle of Fancheng ===
In 219, Liu Bei's general Guan Yu led his forces to attack Fancheng (樊城, present-day Fancheng District, Xiangyang, Hubei), which was guarded by Cao Ren, one of Cao Cao's cousins and trusted generals. Man Chong brought troops to Fancheng to assist Cao Ren in resisting Guan Yu's attack. They were thrown into a dangerous situation when heavy rains caused flooding in the region and parts of Fancheng's walls began to crumble. To make matters worse, the flood destroyed the reinforcements led by Cao Cao's general Yu Jin, who surrendered to the enemy. Guan Yu kept pressing the attack on Fancheng all this while.

Someone suggested to Cao Ren to abandon Fancheng and escape while there was still time, since Guan Yu's forces had not completely surrounded Fancheng yet. Man Chong disagreed and said, "The floodwaters may be flowing very fast, but the flood might not last long. Guan Yu had already sent a detachment of troops from his army to station at Jia County (郟縣). There is already much panic and fear among the people living in the lands south of Xu County (許縣). Guan Yu doesn't dare to advance further because he's worried that his base (in southern Jing Province) will come under attack. If we abandon Fancheng and leave, we'll end up losing all the territories south of the river. Sir, you should continue to hold up here." Cao Ren agreed with him. Man Chong drowned his horse and pledged to stay with the soldiers in Fancheng to the end.

When Xu Huang, another of Cao Cao's generals, showed up at Fancheng with reinforcements, Man Chong joined him in attacking Guan Yu and succeeded in breaking the siege on Fancheng. As a reward for his efforts, the Han imperial court promoted Man Chong from a secondary marquis to a village marquis under the title "Marquis of Anchang Village" (安昌亭侯).

== Service under Cao Pi ==
Following Cao Cao's death in 220, Man Chong continued serving under his son and successor, Cao Pi, who usurped the throne from Emperor Xian later that year, ended the Eastern Han dynasty, and established the state of Cao Wei with himself as the emperor. After his coronation, Cao Pi promoted Man Chong to General Who Spreads Martial Might (揚武將軍).

Sometime between 220 and 222, Man Chong participated in two battles against Wei's rival state, Eastern Wu, founded by Cao Cao's old rival Sun Quan. In the first battle, he defeated Wu forces at Jiangling (江陵; around present-day Jingzhou, Hubei). After the battle, Cao Pi promoted him to General Who Calms the Waves (伏波將軍) and ordered him to station at Xinye (新野; present-day Xinye County, Henan). In the second battle, Man Chong led the Wei army's vanguard force during a Wei campaign against Wu. The vanguard force, under his command, reached the Jing Lake (精湖) and established their position on the side of the lake directly across the enemy's side. Man Chong foresaw that the enemy would attempt to set fire to his camp at night as the winds were strong, so he warned his subordinates and put his troops on high alert. His prediction came true that night. Since they were prepared, Man Chong and his troops successfully repelled the attack and defended their position. As a reward for his contributions, Man Chong was promoted from a village marquis to a district marquis under the title "Marquis of Nan District" (南鄉侯).

In 222, Cao Pi granted Man Chong imperial authority and awarded him a ceremonial axe. Two years later, he promoted Man Chong to General of the Vanguard (前將軍).

== Service under Cao Rui ==
Following Cao Pi's death in 226, his son Cao Rui succeeded him as the emperor of Wei. After his coronation, Cao Rui elevated Man Chong from the status of a district marquis to a county marquis under the title "Marquis of Changyi" (昌邑侯). In 228, he appointed Man Chong as the Inspector (刺史) of Yu Province.

In the spring of 228, (Note: Man Chong's biography in the Sanguozhi mentioned that these events took place in the 3rd year of the Taihe era (227–233) of Cao Rui's reign, i.e. c.229. This is a mistake. It was actually in the 2nd year of the Taihe era, i.e. c.228, according to the Zizhi Tongjian; Cao Rui's and Sun Quan's biographies in Sanguozhi also dated Cao Xiu's defeat and death to c.228.) defectors from Wei's rival state, Wu, claimed that Wu forces were preparing to attack the territories north of the Yangtze River, with the Wu emperor Sun Quan personally leading his forces. Man Chong deduced that the Wu forces were deliberately spreading misinformation and that their true target was Xiyang County (西陽縣; southwest of present-day Guangshan County, Henan), so he gave orders to strengthen the defences at Xiyang County. When Sun Quan found out, he had no choice but to call off the attack.

In the autumn of the same year, believing Zhou Fang's fake defection was real, Cao Xiu led troops from Lujiang Commandery (廬江郡; around present-day Lu'an, Anhui) into Wu lands with Man Chong ordered by the Emperor to lead troops to Xiakou (夏口; in present-day Wuhan, Hubei). Man Chong wrote a memorial to the emperor: "Cao Xiu may be wise and decisive, but he has little experience in battle. The route that he is taking has a lake behind it and the river beside it. It is easy to advance but difficult to retreat. Military leaders tend to avoid travelling across such terrain if possible. If he is going into Wuqiangkou (無彊口), he should be well-prepared." Before Man Chong's memorial reached Cao Rui, however, Cao Xiu and his army had already entered Wuqiangkou, where Wu forces cut off his line of retreat and inflicted heavy casualties on Cao Xiu's forces.

After Cao Xiu died later in 228, Man Chong, as General of the Vanguard, was ordered to replace him as the supervisor of military operations in Yang Province. As Man Chong had gained much support from the locals during his tenure as the Administrator of Runan Commandery, the people in Runan Commandery wanted to follow him when they learnt that he had been reassigned to Yang Province. A military officer wrote to the emperor Cao Rui, seeking permission to execute the local leaders to stop an emigration of the populace. However, Cao Rui did not approve and, as a compromise, he allowed Man Chong to bring a following of one thousand personal retainers to Yang Province while the rest had to remain in Runan Commandery.

=== Battle of Hefei (231) ===
In 230, Cao Rui promoted Man Chong to General Who Attacks the East (征東將軍). In the winter of that year, after receiving intelligence that the Wu emperor Sun Quan was planning to attack Hefei, Man Chong immediately requested for reinforcements from Yan and Yu provinces and stepped up the defences at Hefei. When Sun Quan heard about it, he called off the attack on Hefei. Man Chong knew that Sun Quan was only pretending to retreat to put him off guard, and would come back to attack Hefei again once the reinforcements left. He was proven right as Sun Quan attacked Hefei after about 10 days. However, as Hefei was well-defended, Sun Quan's forces could not breach the walls and had to withdraw.

In c.November 231, a Wu officer Sun Bu (孫布) secretly sent a messenger to meet Wang Ling, the Wei inspector of Yang Province, and convey his desire to defect to Wei. Sun Bu also said in his message: "As we are too far apart from each other, I cannot come to you. You will need to send troops to escort me over." Wang Ling then passed the letter to Man Chong and asked him to send a convoy of troops to escort Sun Bu to Yang Province. Man Chong suspected that Sun Bu was pretending to defect so he refused and wrote a reply to Sun Bu in Wang Ling's name: "It is good to hear that you have recognised the folly of your ways and now desire to leave your tyrannical government and return to the path of righteousness. This is truly commendable. However, as much as I would like to send troops to escort you over, I do not think it is a good idea. If I send too few troops, they will not be able to protect you. If I send too many troops, the Wu government will find it suspicious. I think you should secretly make plans for yourself first and act accordingly when the time comes."

Man Chong was not on good terms with his colleague, Wang Ling, who spread rumours that Man Chong was addicted to alcohol, physically unfit for his job, and unruly and defiant. When the rumours reached the Wei imperial capital Luoyang, an official Guo Mou (郭謀) suggested to the emperor to summon Man Chong to Luoyang and see if the rumours were true, as opposed to immediately removing Man Chong from office. Cao Rui heeded the suggestion. When Man Chong met the emperor, he appeared to be in good health and remained sober after consuming one dan of alcohol. Cao Rui thus concluded that the rumours were untrue and ordered Man Chong to return to his post. Man Chong, however, wanted to remain in Luoyang so he repeatedly sought permission from Cao Rui but was denied. Cao Rui told him, "In the past, Lian Po ate and drank heavily to show that he was in good health, while Ma Yuan turned his body to look backward while he was on horseback to show that he was still fit for battle. You aren't even old, yet you say you're old. Why don't you compare yourself with Lian Po and Ma Yuan? You should be thinking about defending the border and serving your country."

Before Man Chong left for Luoyang, he instructed his chief clerk, who was in charge during his absence, not to give Wang Ling command of any of his troops. Wang Ling, unable to get any troops from Man Chong's units, had to send his own subordinates and 700 soldiers from his own units to meet Sun Bu. As Man Chong foresaw, Sun Bu was indeed pretending to defect. Wang Ling's subordinates and 700 men fell into an ambush and suffered heavy casualties.

=== Battle of Lujiang (232) ===
In 232, when the Wu general Lu Xun led troops to attack Lujiang Commandery (廬江郡; around present-day Lu'an, Anhui), Man Chong's subordinates urged him to send reinforcements there. However, Man Chong refused and said, "Lujiang may be small, but its troops are well-trained and seasoned in battle. They can definitely defend Lujiang for some time. Besides, as the enemy has left their ships and travelled 200 li deep into our territory, their rear must be unguarded. We should use this opportunity to lure them deeper into our territory and wait for an opportunity to strike back. Let's allow them to push further in. By the time they want to retreat, it'll be too late for them." He then assembled his troops and waited at Yangyikou (楊宜口). When the Wu forces heard about it, they immediately retreated that night. At the time, as the Wu emperor Sun Quan was eager to conquer Yang Province, he came up with new plans for invasion every year.

=== Battle of Hefei (233) ===
In 233, Man Chong wrote a memorial to the Wei imperial court, seeking permission to move the troops out of Hefei and station them in an area some 30 li west of the city, and build a fortress there. His plan was meant to lure Wu forces to attack a weakly defended Hefei, cut off their retreat route, and use the opportunity to destroy them. Jiang Ji, a Wei official, disagreed with Man Chong's plan because he believed that the Wu forces would see the drastic reduction in Hefei's defences as a sign of weakness on Wei's part, and become more emboldened to attack and pillage the city. The Wei emperor Cao Rui thought that Jiang Ji made sense so he did not approve Man Chong's idea.

Man Chong sent in another memorial to argue that his plan would work because it would mislead the Wu forces into thinking that they were giving up on Hefei and lure them deeper into Wei territory, where they would lose their advantage in naval warfare and become more vulnerable. He also quoted lines from The Art of War in his memorial to support his point on using deception to lure the enemy into a trap. Zhao Zi (趙咨), a Wei official, supported Man Chong's idea and managed to convince Cao Rui to approve it.

Later that year, the Wu emperor Sun Quan personally led his forces to attack Hefei and wanted to besiege the newly constructed fortress, known as Xincheng (新城; literally "new fortress/city"), at the west of Hefei. However, as Xincheng was too far from the riverbank, the Wu forces were hesitant to launch an all-out attack. They remained on their ships on the river for about 20 days.

Man Chong gathered his subordinates and told them, "Sun Quan knows that I have moved the troops out of Hefei. He'll definitely want to put on a show of might so that he can brag about how powerful his army is. Although he doesn't have the courage to push further in and attack Xincheng, he'll definitely send his troops ashore just to show off how big his army is." He then ordered 6,000 troops to lie in ambush in Hefei and wait for the Wu soldiers to come ashore. As Man Chong predicted, Sun Quan did order his troops to go ashore and put on a show of might. When that happened, the 6,000 troops in Hefei launched a sudden and fierce attack on them. Hundreds of Wu soldiers were killed while some drowned as they tried to flee back to their ships.

=== Battle of Hefei (234) ===
In 234, Sun Quan personally led a 100,000-strong army to attack Xincheng, Hefei as part of a three pronged invasion in the south, a coordinated campaign with Shu Han Chancellor Zhuge Liang who attacked in the northwest. There are varied accounts of what Man Chong wished to do, Tian Yu and Liu Shao both successfully argued to Cao Rui against Man Chong's plan to recall everyone off leave and attack immediately. Once forces were gathered, Man Chong wanted to abandon Hefei and lure Sun Quan's forces to Shouchun but the Emperor refused, certain Sun Quan would be held up at Hefei and retreat before Cao Rui himself could arrive.

During the siege, Man Chong recruited dozens of fierce warriors to make torches from tree branches, douse them with oil, and take advantage of the winds to set fire to the Wu army's siege engines and destroy them. Sun Quan's nephew, Sun Tai, was killed in the battle. Later, with his army hit by illness and aware Cao Rui was arriving soon, Sun Quan withdrew his forces.

In the spring of 235, Sun Quan sent a few thousand of his soldiers and their families to farm on the north banks of the Yangtze as part of a tuntian programme. By early autumn, Man Chong deduced that it was the harvest season, so the Wu soldiers and their families would be out in the fields collecting the harvest, and their strongholds would thus be undefended. He then sent his troops to launch a surprise attack on them, destroying their strongholds and burning down their crops. Cao Rui issued an imperial decree to praise Man Chong and award the spoils of war to Man Chong's troops.

=== Later career ===
Sometime between 22 March and 20 April 239, Man Chong retired from military service in Hefei and returned to the Wei imperial capital, Luoyang, where he served as Grand Commandant (太尉) in the imperial court. Throughout his life, he did not accumulate wealth for his family and was quite poor in his old age. The Wei emperor Cao Rui issued an imperial decree to praise Man Chong for his loyalty and dedication, and award him 10 qing of land, 500 hu of grain and 200,000 coins. The total number of taxable households in Man Chong's marquisate increased over the years until it reached 9,600. One of his sons and one of his grandsons were enfeoffed as village marquises.

== Death ==
Man Chong died sometime between 17 April and 16 May 242 during the reign of Cao Rui's adopted son and successor, Cao Fang. He was honoured with the posthumous title "Marquis Jing" (景侯) after death.

== Appraisal ==
Chen Shou, who wrote Man Chong's biography in the Records of the Three Kingdoms, appraised him as follows: "Man Chong was ambitious, resolute, courageous and resourceful."

== Descendants ==
Man Chong had at least three sons and one daughter. He and his son Man Wei and grandsons Man Changwu and Man Fen were all described as eight chi tall (≈1.84 metres).

- Man Wei (滿偉), whose courtesy name was Gongheng (公衡), inherited his father's peerage and marquisate as the Marquis of Changyi (昌邑侯). He was known for being morally upright and magnanimous. Like his father, he served in the Cao Wei state and the highest appointment he held was Minister of the Guards (衞尉).
  - Man Changwu (滿長武; died in or after June 260?) was Man Wei's eldest son and he resembled his grandfather Man Chong in character. When he was 23, he started served as an assistant under Sima Zhao, the regent and de facto ruler of the Cao Wei state in its final years. In 257, when a rebellion broke out in Shouchun, Sima Zhao ordered Man Wei to join him in suppressing the rebellion. When Man Wei reached Xuchang, he fell sick so he remained in Xuchang and did not meet up with Sima Zhao at Shouchun. When Man Changwu, who was with Sima Zhao at Shouchun, heard about his father's illness, he left Shouchun and went to Xuchang to see his father. Sima Zhao was very unhappy with Man Changwu because of this. Later, he found an excuse to order Man Changwu's arrest and imprisonment. Man Changwu died under torture while in prison, while his father Man Wei was stripped of his titles and reduced to the status of a commoner. Many people saw this incident as a grievous injustice to Man Wei and Man Changwu. In 260, when the Wei emperor Cao Mao launched a coup in an attempt to seize back power from Sima Zhao, Man Changwu was in charge of guarding one of the palace gates. Sima Zhao's younger brother, Sima Gan (司馬幹), led his men to the palace to assist Sima Zhao, but Man Changwu refused to let him pass and told him to enter through another gate instead. Later, when Sima Zhao asked Sima Gan why he was late, Sima Gan told him what happened. Wang Xian (王羨), a military adviser to Sima Zhao, was also denied entry so he bore a grudge against Man Changwu and later often spoke ill of him in front of Sima Zhao. (Note: If both annotations are correct, Man Changwu must have died after Cao Mao's attempted coup.)
- Man Bing (滿炳) had the courtesy name Gongyan (公琰) and he served as a Major of Separate Command (別部司馬) in the Wei army. Ying Qu (应璩), a nephew of Ying Shao, once wrote a letter to him (与满公琰书), which was recorded in vol.42 of Wen Xuan.
- Man Chong's daughter married Sima Gan (司馬幹), a younger brother of the Wei regent Sima Zhao.
- Man Chong had another unnamed son, who was younger than Man Wei.
  - Man Fen (滿奮), courtesy name Wuqiu (武秋), (Note: The Zizhi Tongjian also recorded a conversation between Wang Dun and Xi Jian in c.September 323 where they talked about Man Fen and Yue Guang, addressing them by their courtesy names.) was the son of Man Chong's unnamed son. He was known for being understanding, cultured, virtuous and discerning, and for resembling his grandfather Man Chong in character. He served in the government of the Western Jin and rose to the positions of Prefect of the Masters of Writing (尚書令) and Colonel-Director of Retainers (司隷校尉) during the reign of Emperor Hui. As Colonel-Director of Retainers, he would be involved in the arrests of the deposed Crown Prince Sima Yu's supporters in c. February 300, though they were soon released. During his tenure as Prefect of the Masters of Writing, he, along with Yue Guang and Cui Sui (崔随), presented the imperial seal to Sima Lun as he usurped the throne in February 301. Man Fen survived Sima Lun's downfall, but in 304, during another tenure as Colonel-Director of Retainers, he was involved in a plot to kill Shangguan Yi (上官已), (Note: Shangguan's name is sometimes written as "Si" (巳).) a general who used to serve under Sima Ai and was tyrannical while stationed in Luoyang. The plot leaked and Man Fen was killed.

== In popular culture ==
Man Chong is a playable character in the ninth instalment of the Dynasty Warriors video game series by Koei Tecmo.

== See also ==
- Lists of people of the Three Kingdoms
