= Sima Gan =

Prince of Pingyuan

Sima Gan 司馬榦

Prince of Pingyuan (平原王)
- Reign: 9 February 266 - 26 February 311
- Successor: none; title abolished
- Born: 232
- Died: February 26, 311 (aged 78–79); Luoyang, Henan
- Wife: Man Chong's daughter and younger sister of Man Wei
- Issue: Sima Guang (司马广); Sima Yong (司马永)
Names
- Family name: Sima (司馬); Given name: Gan (榦); Courtesy name: Ziliang (子良)
Posthumous name
- None (Note: At the time of Sima Gan's death, Liu Cong was attacking Luoyang, and so the Jin court could not decide on a posthumous name.)
- House: House of Sima
- Father: Sima Yi
- Mother: Empress Xuanmu

Sima Gan (司马榦; 232 - 26 February 311), courtesy name Ziliang (子良), was the youngest son of Sima Yi and his main wife Zhang Chunhua, and a younger brother of Sima Shi and Sima Zhao. Sima Yi, Sima Shi and Sima Zhao eventually became regents of the Cao Wei state during the Three Kingdoms era.

== Life under Cao Wei ==
Sima Gan was born in 232 during the reign of Cao Rui, as the youngest son of Sima Yi and his wife Zhang Chunhua. (Note: Of Sima Yi's sons, only Sima Shi (first), Sima Liang (fourth) and Sima Lun (ninth) had their birth orders explicitly recorded in Book of Jin. Sima Zhao's biography in the same work also recorded that he was a younger full-brother of Sima Shi. Sima Gan's half-brothers who were older than him include Sima Liang, Sima Zhou and Sima Jing. The age order between Sima Gan and Sima Jun (Yi's youngest son with Lady Fu, and the youngest full brother of Liang, Zhou and Jing) is unknown; Jun was also born in 232 as he was eight (by East Asian reckoning) when Cao Fang became emperor in Jan 239.) Like his brothers, Sima Gan was given various posts and titles during the Cao Wei era; unlike them, Gan's posts and titles were largely minor or ceremonial.

The first recorded historical event Sima Gan was involved in was the attempted coup by Cao Mao, by then a puppet under Sima Zhao's control. In June 260, Cao Mao launched a coup in an attempt to seize back power from Sima Zhao. Man Changwu (a grandson of Man Chong) was in charge of guarding one of the palace gates. Sima Gan led his men to the palace to assist Sima Zhao, but Man Changwu refused to let him pass and told him to enter through another gate instead. Later, when Sima Zhao asked Sima Gan why he was late, Sima Gan told him what happened. (Note: Another version of this anecdote was recorded in Xun Xu's biography in Book of Jin. In this account, Sima Gan was denied entry by Sun You (孫佑), who was also an officer guarding the main gate, so he had to enter the palace through another gate. When Sima Zhao found out why Sima Gan showed up late, he wanted to execute Sun You and his family. However, Xun Xu advised him against it by pointing out that it would be unfair and unjust to punish Sun You's family as well. Sima Zhao heeded Xun Xu's advice and punished Sun You only, by demoting him to the status of a commoner. It is possible that both Man Changwu and Sun You were involved in the anecdote.) (Note: The Shiyu also recorded that in 257, when Zhuge Dan's Rebellion broke out in Shouchun, Sima Zhao ordered Man Wei (Man Changwu's father) to join him in suppressing the rebellion. When Man Wei reached Xuchang, he fell sick so he remained in Xuchang and did not meet up with Sima Zhao at Shouchun. When Man Changwu, who was with Sima Zhao at Shouchun, heard about his father's illness, he left Shouchun and went to Xuchang to see his father. Sima Zhao was very unhappy with Man Changwu because of this. Later, he found an excuse to order Man Changwu's arrest and imprisonment. Man Changwu died under torture while in prison, while Man Wei was stripped of his titles and reduced to the status of a commoner. Many people saw this incident as a grievous injustice to Man Wei and Man Changwu. By combining the two anecdotes, Man Changwu's arrest, imprisonment and subsequent death under torture must have taken place after Cao Mao's attempted coup, and that Man's actions during the coup was the "excuse" Sima Zhao was looking for. However, it is unknown when Man Wei was stripped of his titles and reduced to the status of a commoner.)

Sima Zhao was made Prince of Jin on 2 May 264. With this elevation, when Sima Zhao established the Five Feudal Ranks of Zhou, Sima Gan was made Count of Dingtao.

== During the Jin era ==
Sima Zhao died in September 265, and was succeeded as regent of Cao Wei by his son Sima Yan. In February 266, Sima Yan accepted Cao Huan's abdication and founded the Jin dynasty. Sima Gan was then made Prince of Pingyuan, with a fiefdom of 11,300 households. Although his fiefdom was large, he did not take an active role in administration; instead, he appointed officials based on their abilities and the positions which needed to be filled. He also allowed his income (cloth, silk) to accumulate and rot.

Sima Yan died in May 290, and his son Sima Zhong ascended the throne. During audiences with the emperor, as the emperor's great-uncle, Sima Gan was allowed to wear his shoes and carry his sword, as well as walk at a normal pace.

The Book of Jin recorded several anecdotes between Sima Gan and his grandnephew Sima Jiong. During the War of the Eight Princes, after Sima Jiong defeated Sima Lun, while other clansmen of the Sima family and court officials sent oxen and wine as gifts to Sima Jiong, Sima Gan offered him 100 cash. At their meeting, Sima Gan said, "The Prince of Zhao (Sima Lun) caused a rebellion and you managed to put it down; that is your credit. Now, I'm congratulating you using these 100 cash. Even so, it is very difficult to remain at a high position; you must be careful and cautious." After becoming regent, Sima Jiong once received a visit from his great-uncle. While Sima Jiong stepped out of the house and received Sima Gan with courtesy, upon entering the house, Sima Gan sat down on Jiong's bed and did not allow Jiong to be seated. Gan then said, "You must not emulate the son of that Bai woman (referring to Sima Lun)." After Sima Jiong was killed in January 303, Sima Gan cried bitterly and told those around him, "The Sima clan is waning; only this child is the most capable. Now that he has died, the Sima clan is in peril!"

After Sima Yue became Emperor Hui's last regent in 306, he decided to pay Sima Gan a visit at Gan's residence in Luoyang. Gan declined to meet him; after a lengthy wait, Gan despatched a servant to see Yue off. At the same time, Gan left the door ajar, allowing him to observe the scene from behind the door. At the time, people could not understand his actions; they thought that Gan was ill, or that he had turned reclusive.

== Descendants ==
Sima Gan was recorded to have two sons. The elder Sima Guang died young and presumably left no descendants. The younger Sima Yong was made Duke of Ande County in 290; he and his family were later killed, presumably during the Disaster of Yongjia.
