= Wang Ling (Three Kingdoms) =

Chinese Cao Wei state general (172–251)

- 王淩

Grand Commandant (太尉)
- In office 28 January 250 – 15 June 251
- Monarch: Cao Fang
- Preceded by: Jiang Ji
- Succeeded by: Sima Fu

Minister of Works (司空)
- In office c.October 248 – 28 January 250
- Monarch: Cao Fang
- Preceded by: Gao Rou
- Succeeded by: Sun Li

General of Chariots and Cavalry (車騎將軍)
- In office 2 July 241 – October or November 248
- Monarch: Cao Fang
- Preceded by: Huang Quan
- Succeeded by: Guo Huai

General Who Attacks the East (征東將軍)
- In office 240 – 2 July 241
- Monarch: Cao Fang

Personal details
- Born: 172 Qi County, Shanxi
- Died: 15 June 251 (Note: Cao Fang's biography in the Sanguozhi recorded that Wang Ling committed suicide on the jiayin day of the 5th month of the 3rd year of the Jiaping era of Cao Fang's reign. This date corresponds to 15 June 251 in the Julian calendar. A Weilüe annotation in Wang's biography in vol.28 of Sanguozhi recorded that Wang was 80 (by East Asian reckoning) when he died.)
- Children: Wang Guang (Note: Vol.19 of Shishuo Xinyu recorded that Wang Guang married a daughter of Zhuge Dan.); Wang Feixiao; Wang Jinhu; Wang Mingshan (Note: According to the Wei Mo Zhuan, "Mingshan" was his courtesy name.)
- Relatives: Wang Yun (uncle); Guo Huai's wife (sister)
- Occupation: Military general, politician
- Courtesy name: Yanyun (彥雲)
- Peerage: Marquis of Nan District (南鄉侯)

Wang Ling (172—15 June 251), courtesy name Yanyun, was a Chinese military general and politician of the state of Cao Wei during the Three Kingdoms period of China.

== Early life and joining Cao Cao ==
Wang Ling's family fled to the countryside after his uncle, Wang Yun, was executed in 192 for fomenting Lü Bu's assassination of warlord Dong Zhuo. Later he was declared xiaolian, a crucial nomination to be considered for civil service appointments, and became the Administrator of Zhongshan Commandery (中山太守). His excellent public service was noticed by chancellor Cao Cao, who moved him into his office.

== Service in Cao Wei ==
In late 220, after Cao Cao's death in March that year, his heir Cao Pi forced Emperor Xian of Han to abdicate and established the state of Cao Wei.

During Cao Pi's reign, Wang Ling engaged in several battles with Eastern Wu. As the Inspector of Yan Province, he attacked Sun Quan under the command of Zhang Liao. His victory led to his promotion to General Who Builds Martialism (建武將軍).

Cao Pi died in June 226 and was succeeded by his heir Cao Rui. During the Battle of Shiting against Eastern Wu, Wang Ling rescued the besieged general Cao Xiu.

In c.November 231, a Wu officer Sun Bu (孫布) secretly sent a messenger to meet Wang Ling, who was then Inspector of Yang Province, and convey his desire to defect to Wei. Sun Bu also said in his message: "As we are too far apart from each other, I cannot come to you. You will need to send troops to escort me over." Wang Ling then passed the letter to Man Chong and asked him to send a convoy of troops to escort Sun Bu to Yang Province. Man Chong suspected that Sun Bu was pretending to defect so he refused and wrote a reply to Sun Bu in Wang Ling's name: "It is good to hear that you have recognised the folly of your ways and now desire to leave your tyrannical government and return to the path of righteousness. This is truly commendable. However, as much as I would like to send troops to escort you over, I do not think it is a good idea. If I send too few troops, they will not be able to protect you. If I send too many troops, the Wu government will find it suspicious. I think you should secretly make plans for yourself first and act accordingly when the time comes."

Man Chong was not on good terms with Wang Ling, who spread rumours that Man Chong was addicted to alcohol, physically unfit for his job, and unruly and defiant. When the rumours reached the Wei imperial capital Luoyang, an official Guo Mou (郭謀) suggested to the emperor to summon Man Chong to Luoyang and see if the rumours were true, as opposed to immediately removing Man Chong from office. Cao Rui heeded the suggestion. When Man Chong met the emperor, he appeared to be in good health and remained sober after consuming one dan of alcohol. Cao Rui thus concluded that the rumours were untrue and ordered Man Chong to return to his post. Man Chong, however, wanted to remain in Luoyang so he repeatedly sought permission from Cao Rui but was denied. Cao Rui told him, "In the past, Lian Po ate and drank heavily to show that he was in good health, while Ma Yuan turned his body to look backward while he was on horseback to show that he was still fit for battle. You aren't even old, yet you say you're old. Why don't you compare yourself with Lian Po and Ma Yuan? You should be thinking about defending the border and serving your country."

Before Man Chong left for Luoyang, he instructed his chief clerk, who was in charge during his absence, not to give Wang Ling command of any of his troops. Wang Ling, unable to get any troops from Man Chong's units, had to send his own subordinates and 700 soldiers from his own units to meet Sun Bu. As Man Chong foresaw, Sun Bu was indeed pretending to defect. Wang Ling's subordinates and 700 men fell into an ambush and suffered heavy casualties.

Cao Rui died in January 239, and was succeeded by Cao Fang. On 2 July 241, Wang Ling was promoted to General of Chariots and Cavalry (車騎將軍) after a major victory against Wu general Quan Cong. He was also granted a fiefdom consisting of 1350 households.

== Rebellion ==
In 241 (the second year of the Zhengshi era) (Note: As per the customs of the time, Cao Fang continued to use Jingchu (Cao Rui's last era name) as the era name of the first year of his reign. Cao Rui died on the 1st day of the 3rd year of the Jingchu era (22 Jan 239 in the Julian calendar).), Wang Ling was appointed Minister of Works, while his nephew Linghu Yu (令狐愚) became the Inspector of Yan Province (兗州刺史). Later, Wang Ling lost faith in Cao Fang's ability to rule after Sima Yi's coup d'etat in the Incident at the Gaoping Tombs succeeded in turning the emperor against Sima Yi's rival, Cao Shuang. As a result, Wang Ling conspired to replace emperor Cao Fang with his uncle Cao Biao. The conspiracy suffered a setback, however, when Linghu Yu died of an illness. The plot was discovered and Sima Yi led an army to Wang before he could prepare himself for a defense. After Wang Ling surrendered to Sima Yi with the promise of a pardon, he was forced to commit suicide, and his family members and associates were condemned to family annihilation.

== See also ==
- Lists of people of the Three Kingdoms
