= Sima Yi =

Chinese general, politician and regent (179–251)

- 司馬懿
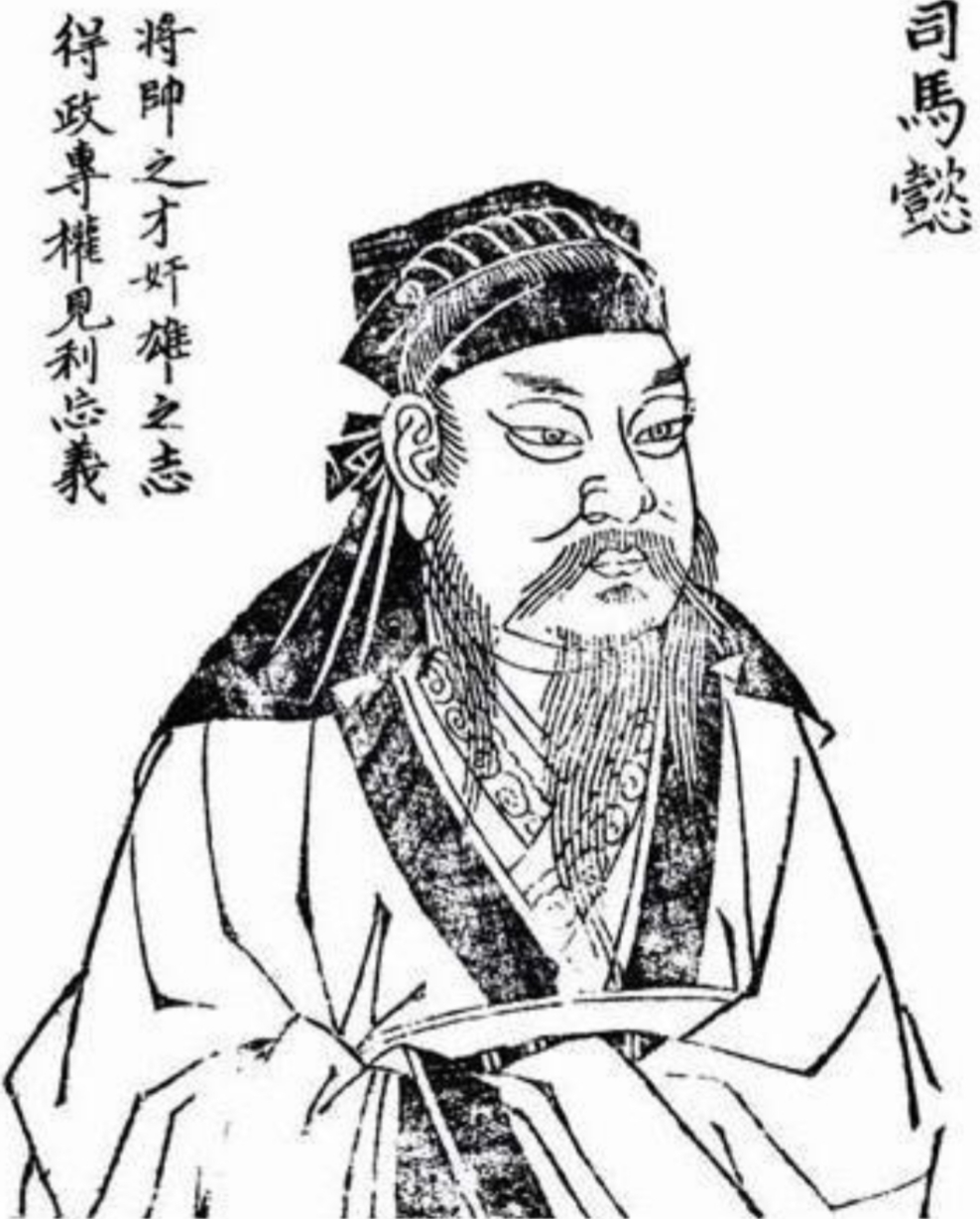
- A Ming dynasty illustration of Sima Yi

Grand Tutor (太傅)
- In office 13 March 239 – 7 September 251
- Monarch: Cao Fang
- Preceded by: Zhong Yao
- Succeeded by: Sima Fu

Manager of the Affairs of the Imperial Secretariat (錄尚書事)
- In office 22 January – 13 March 239
- Monarch: Cao Fang
- Succeeded by: Cao Shuang

Palace Attendant
- In office 22 January – 13 March 239
- Monarch: Cao Fang
- In office 221–226
- Monarch: Cao Pi

Grand Commandant (太尉)
- In office 13 February 235 – 13 March 239
- Monarch: Cao Rui / Cao Fang
- Preceded by: Hua Xin
- Succeeded by: Man Chong

General-in-Chief (大將軍)
- In office 16 March 230 – 13 February 235
- Monarch: Cao Rui
- Preceded by: Cao Zhen
- Succeeded by: Cao Yu

Chief Controller of Jing and Yu Provinces (荊、豫州牧)
- In office July 227 – 16 March 230
- Monarch: Cao Rui

General of Agile Cavalry (驃騎將軍)
- In office January or February 227 – 16 March 230
- Monarch: Cao Rui

General Who Pacifies the Army (撫軍將軍)
- In office 224 – January or February 227
- Monarch: Cao Pi / Cao Rui

Right Supervisor of the Imperial Secretariat (尚書右僕射)
- In office 221–226
- Monarch: Cao Pi

Palace Assistant Imperial Clerk (御史中丞)
- In office 220–221
- Monarch: Cao Pi

Master of Writing (尚書)
- In office 220
- Monarch: Cao Pi

Major to the Army of the Chancellor (丞相軍司馬)
- In office 219–220
- Monarch: Emperor Xian of Han
- Chancellor: Cao Cao

Master of Records to the Chancellor (丞相主簿)
- In office 215–?
- Monarch: Emperor Xian of Han
- Chancellor: Cao Cao

Senior Clerk for Literary Scholarship (文學掾)
- In office 208–?
- Monarch: Emperor Xian of Han
- Chancellor: Cao Cao

Personal details
- Born: 179 Wen County, Henei Commandery, Han Dynasty
- Died: September 7, 251 (aged 71–72) Luoyang, Cao Wei
- Resting place: Mengjin County, Henan
- Spouse: Zhang Chunhua
- Domestic partners: Lady Fu; Lady Zhang; Lady Bai
- Children: Sima Shi; Sima Zhao; Sima Liang; Sima Zhou; Sima Lun
- Parent: Sima Fang (father)
- Relatives: Sima Lang (brother); Sima Fu (brother); Sima Zhi (cousin); see also Family tree of Sima Yi
- Occupation: Military general, politician, regent
- Courtesy name: Zhongda (仲達)
- Peerage: Marquis of Wuyang (舞陽侯)
Posthumous name
- Emperor Xuan (宣皇帝)
Temple name
- Gaozu (高祖)

Sima Yi
- Traditional Chinese: 司馬懿
- Simplified Chinese: 司马懿
Transcriptions
Standard Mandarin
- Hanyu Pinyin: Sīmǎ Yì
- Wade–Giles: Ssŭ^{1}-ma^{3} I^{4}
- IPA: [sɹ̩́.mà î]
Yue: Cantonese
- Yale Romanization: Sī-máh Yi
- Jyutping: Si^{1}-maa^{5} Ji^{3}
- IPA: [si˥.ma˩˧ ji˧]
Southern Min
- Hokkien POJ: Si-bé Ì
Middle Chinese
- Middle Chinese: sɨ.mˠaX ʔˠiɪH

Courtesy name
- Traditional Chinese: 仲達
- Simplified Chinese: 仲达
Transcriptions
Standard Mandarin
- Hanyu Pinyin: Zhòngdá
- IPA: [ʈʂʊ̂ŋ.tǎ]
Yue: Cantonese
- Yale Romanization: Juhng-daaht
- Jyutping: Zung^{6}-daat^{6}
- IPA: [tsʊŋ˨.tat̚˨]
Southern Min
- Hokkien POJ: Tiōng-ta̍t
Middle Chinese
- Middle Chinese: ɖɨuŋH.dɑt̚

Sima Yi (Chinese: 司馬懿; 179 CE – 7 September 251 CE), courtesy name Zhongda, was a Chinese military general, politician, and regent of the state of Cao Wei during the Three Kingdoms period of China.

He formally began his political career in 208 under the Han dynasty's Imperial Chancellor Cao Cao, and was quickly promoted to higher office. His success in handling domestic and military affairs such as governance and the promotion of agriculture, serving as an adviser, repelling incursions and invasions led by Shu and Wu forces, speedily defeating Meng Da's Xincheng Rebellion, and conquering the Gongsun-led Liaodong commandery, garnered him great prestige. He is perhaps best known for defending Wei from a series of invasions that were led by Wei's rival state Shu between 231 and 234.

In 239, along with another co-regent Cao Shuang, he was made to preside as a regent for the young Cao Fang after the death of latter's adoptive father, Cao Rui. Although amicable at first, the relationship soon deteriorated in light of Cao Shuang's corruption, extravagance, and attempts to curtail Sima Yi's political influence. In February 249, after carefully planning and building up support, Sima Yi ousted Cao Shuang from power in a coup d'état and had him and his associates executed.

Afterwards, Sima Yi became the primary authority in Wei, although in June 251 he faced some opposition from Wang Ling's rebellion, which he swiftly dealt with. Sima Yi died on 7 September 251, at the age of 71 or 72, and was succeeded by his eldest son Sima Shi.

For the remainder of Wei's history, state power was increasingly vested in the Sima clan, which led to the establishment of the Jin dynasty, which was founded by Sima Yi's grandson Sima Yan in February 266. After Sima Yan became emperor, he honoured his grandfather with the posthumous title Emperor Xuan of Jin and the temple name Gaozu. He was also the last common ancestor of all emperors of the Jin dynasty; while emperors of the Western Jin descended from Sima Zhao (his son with wife Zhang Chunhua), emperors of the Eastern Jin descended from Sima Zhou (his son with concubine Lady Fu).

== Family background ==
Sima Yi's ancestral home was in Xiaojing (孝敬里), Wen County, Henei Commandery. His ancestor was Sima Ang the King of Yin (殷王), who briefly ruled one of the Eighteen Kingdoms during the transition period from the Qin dynasty to the Western Han dynasty before Liu Bang's general Han Xin conquered his territory, capturing Sima Ang and his capital city Zhaoge. In the early Han dynasty, Sima Ang's former kingdom, which was largely situated in Henei, became a commandery of the Han Empire and his descendants had lived there since.

Sima Jūn (司馬鈞), an eighth-generation descendant of Sima Ang and the great-great-grandfather of Sima Yi, served as a general of the Han Empire, holding the position General Who Conquers the West (征西將軍). Sima Jūn's son Sima Liang (司馬量) held the position Grand Administrator of Yuzhang, and Sima Liang's son Sima Jùn (司馬儁) served as Grand Administrator of Yingchuan. Sima Jùn's son Sima Fang served as the Prefect of Luoyang (洛陽令), Intendant of Jingzhao, and later as Cavalry Commandant (騎都尉) towards the end of the Eastern Han dynasty. Sima Yi was Sima Fang's second son.

Sima Yi had one elder brother Sima Lang (Boda) and six younger brothers. (Note: in decreasing order of seniority: Sima Fu (Shuda), Sima Kui (Jida), Sima Xun (Xianda), Sima Jin (Huida), Sima Tong (Yada), and Sima Min (Youda).) The eight Sima brothers were collectively known as the "Eight Das" (Note: This was also a term of respect, as other groups of eight talented administrators in the Three Sovereigns and Five Emperors eras were also referred to in this way.) because their courtesy names all ended with da (達).

== Early life ==
Sima Yi displayed intelligence and great ambitions at a young age. He was knowledgeable and well-versed in Confucian classics. When chaos broke out in China towards the End of the Han dynasty, Sima Yi often expressed sympathy and concern for the people. Before he reached adulthood around the age of 19, Sima Yi once met Yang Jun, a commandery administrator who was known for spotting talents. Yang Jun described him as an "extraordinary talent". Cui Yan, a friend of Sima Yi's elder brother, Sima Lang, once said: "(Sima Yi) is intelligent, decisive, and unique. (Sima Lang) can't be compared to him."

Sima Yi and his family used to live in the imperial capital, Luoyang, where his father, Sima Fang, served as a government official. Sima Yi was raised in a strict Confucian manner: He was not allowed to visit his father unless summoned, to speak to his father without being explicitly addressed, and neither was he allowed to be seated in the same room as his father. In 190, when the warlord Dong Zhuo dominated the Han central government and wanted to relocate the imperial capital to Chang'an, Sima Fang ordered Sima Lang to bring the Sima family out of Luoyang and return to their ancestral home in Wen County, Henei Commandery. Some months later, as Sima Lang foresaw that chaos would break out in Henei Commandery, he relocated his family to Liyang Commandery (黎陽郡; around present-day Xun County, Henan), where they stayed with Sima Lang's kinsman, Zhao Weisun. In 194, when war broke out between the warlords Cao Cao and Lü Bu, Sima Lang brought his family out of Liyang Commandery and again returned to their now-ravaged ancestral home in Wen County, Henei Commandery, where Sima Yi and his brothers largely sustained themselves by living as farmers; fending off local groups of bandits while studying diligently during their free time.

Around 201, the administrative office of Henei Commandery nominated Sima Yi to serve in the government by holding local office, possibly as a clerk in charge of the records, and in 202 he was sent as a Reporting Officer (上計掾) to the capital. Around the same year, he married a woman named Zhang Chunhua, possibly at the instigation of his father. At the same time, the warlord Cao Cao, who then held the position of Minister of Works in the Han imperial court, heard of Sima Yi's talent and wanted to recruit him to serve in the administration. Sima Yi declined, presumably on grounds of illness, with the Book of Jin more specifically mentioning that he, seeing that the Han Empire's future was bleak, declined and lied by supposedly saying that he suffered from paralysis; staying at home, with Cao Cao's spies reporting that they saw Sima Yi lying motionless in bed.

One day—in a story that may be apocryphal—while Sima Yi was drying his books under the sun, there was a sudden downpour, so he rushed out to grab his books and was seen by a maid. Sima Yi's wife, Zhang Chunhua, feared that the maid would leak out news that Sima Yi was well and get their family into trouble, so she killed the maid to silence her.

== Service under Cao Cao ==
When Cao Cao died in Luoyang in March 220, there was apprehension in the imperial court. Sima Yi supervised the funerary arrangements to ensure everything would be carried out in an orderly fashion, and accompanied the funeral cortège to Ye, earning the respect of officials within and outside the central government. (Note: Sima Yi's biography in Jin Shu and Jia Kui's biography in Sanguozhi both recorded that they were in charge of Cao Cao's funeral, without mentioning the other party.)

=== Advising Cao Cao to attack Yi Province ===
In 215, Sima Yi accompanied Cao Cao on his campaign against the warlord and Taoist religious leader Zhang Lu, whom Cao Cao defeated at the Battle of Yangping in Hanzhong Commandery. Afterwards Sima Yi urged him to capitalise on the momentum and attack his rival Liu Bei, who was in the neighboring Yi Province. Sima Yi said because Liu Bei had only recently seized control of Yi Province from Liu Zhang, he had yet to establish a strong foothold in the province. Cao Cao rejected Sima Yi's idea and said he was already content with having Longyou (隴右; covering parts of present-day Gansu and Shaanxi). He then turned his attention to his other key rival Sun Quan.

=== Urging Cao Cao to usurp the throne ===
Sun Quan sent an emissary to meet Cao Cao, asking to make peace and expressing his willingness to pledge allegiance to Cao Cao. He also urged Cao Cao to seize the throne from Emperor Xian and declare himself emperor. In response to Sun Quan's suggestion, Cao Cao remarked; "This kid wants me to put myself on top of a fire!" Sima Yi told him: "The Han dynasty nears its end. Your Lordship controls nine-tenths of the Han Empire. You are in a position to take the throne. Sun Quan's submission is the will of Heaven." Previously, during Yu's time and throughout the Xia, Yin, and Zhou dynasties, the rulers who did not hesitate when they should take the throne were the ones who truly understood Heaven's will. Cao Cao did not usurp the throne from Emperor Xian and remained a subject of the Han Empire until his death.

In 216, after Emperor Xian promoted Cao Cao from a duke to a vassal king under the title "King of Wei", Sima Yi became an adviser to Cao Cao's son and heir apparent, Cao Pi, who highly regarded and respected Sima Yi for his brilliance. Along with Chen Qun, Wu Zhi, and Zhu Shuo (朱鑠), Sima Yi was one of Cao Pi's close aides and one of his "Four Friends". Before Cao Pi became his father's heir apparent in 216, he was engaged in a power struggle with his younger brother Cao Zhi over the succession. During this time, Sima Yi was believed to have secretly backed Cao Pi and helped him win the position of heir apparent. He was also partly responsible for Cao Zhi's demotion and removal from politics after Cao Pi became emperor.

When Sima Yi was appointed as an Army Major (軍司馬), he suggested to Cao Cao to stockpile food supplies and maintain their defences because there were more than 200,000 people who were unable to sustain themselves through farming. Cao Cao accepted his idea and implemented a policy for the people to farm and stockpile grain.

=== Battle of Fancheng ===
Sima Yi warned Cao Cao about Hu Xiu (胡修) and Fu Fang (傅方), who respectively served as the Inspector of Jing Province and the Administrator of Nanxiang Commandery (南鄉郡; in Jing Province) at the time. Sima Yi said Hu Xiu was violent and Fu Fang was arrogant, and that neither should be entrusted with the responsibility of guarding the border at Jing Province, but Cao Cao ignored him. In 219, during the Battle of Fancheng, while Cao Cao's general Cao Ren was besieged by Liu Bei's general Guan Yu in Fancheng, Cao Cao ordered Yu Jin to lead reinforcements to lift the siege on Fancheng. The reinforcements were killed in a flood and Yu Jin surrendered to Guan Yu. As Sima Yi foresaw, Hu Xiu and Fu Fang defected to Guan Yu, placing Cao Ren in a more perilous situation.

Upon learning of Yu Jin's defeat, Cao Cao felt the Han imperial capital Xuchang was too near enemy territory so he considered moving the capital further north into Hebei. Sima Yi and Jiang Ji said; "Yu Jin's defeat ... was not due to flaws in our defences, nor will it significantly affect us. Moving the imperial capital is showing our weakness to the enemy. It will cause unrest in the regions around the Huai and Mian rivers. Sun Quan and Liu Bei seem close to each other, but they actually don't trust each other. Sun Quan will feel very uneasy upon seeing Guan Yu's victory, so we should incite him to attack Guan Yu's base in Jing Province. This will lift the siege on Fancheng." Cao Cao heeded their advice and Sun Quan later sent his general Lü Meng to attack Gong'an County and invade Jing Province in the winter of 219–220. Sun Quan's forces captured and executed Guan Yu.

Cao Cao wanted to relocate residents in Jing Province and Yingchuan Commandery further north as he felt they were too close to enemy territory in the south. Sima Yi, however, advised him against doing so and said; "The Jing and Chu regions are unstable. The people are easy to move but hard to pacify. As Guan Yu has been recently defeated, bad people will go into hiding. If we move the good people, we might cause them to feel distressed and unwilling to return to our side." Cao Cao heeded Sima Yi's advice. The people affected by the Battle of Fancheng reverted to their original livelihoods after the battle.

When Cao Cao died in Luoyang in March 220, there was apprehension in the imperial court. Sima Yi supervised the funerary arrangements to ensure everything would be carried out in an orderly fashion, and accompanied the funeral cortège to Ye, earning the respect of officials within and outside the central government.

== Service under Cao Pi ==
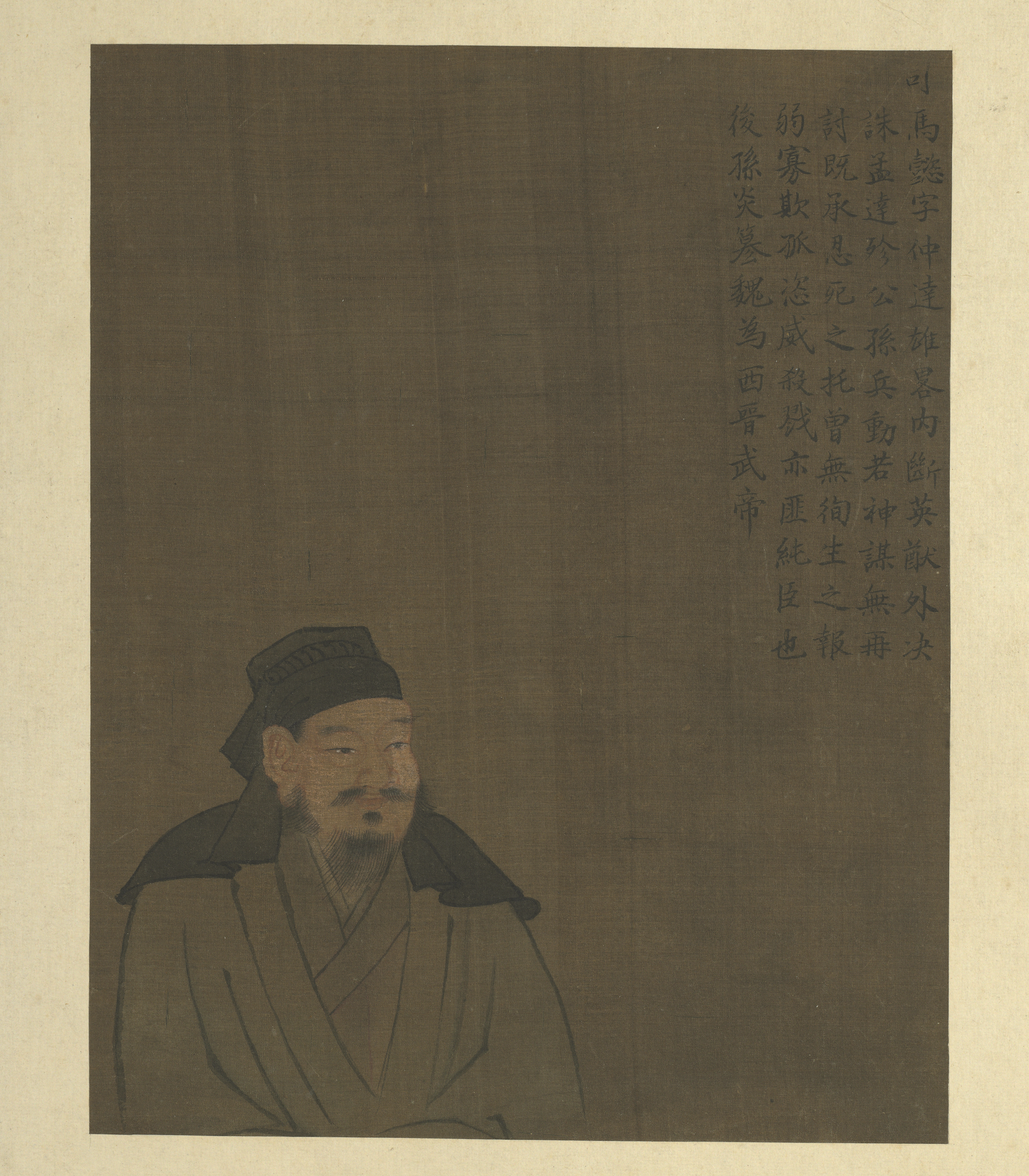
Portrait of Sima Yi (National Palace Museum)

After Cao Pi succeeded his father as the vassal King of Wei and Imperial Chancellor of the Han Empire in early 220, he enfeoffed Sima Yi as Village Marquis of Hejin (河津亭侯) and appointed him as his Chief Clerk (長史).

Later, when Sun Quan led his forces to attack Cao Pi's territories in Jing Province, some officials rejected the idea of resisting Sun Quan because Fancheng and Xiangyang lacked food supplies. Cao Ren, who was defending Xiangyang, had been reassigned from Fancheng to defend Wan. Sima Yi said; "Sun Quan has recently defeated Guan Yu. At this time, he will want to be tying up his own business, and will not dare cause us trouble. Xiangyang's land and water routes are crucial to its defences against enemy attacks, so we cannot abandon the city." Cao Pi ignored Sima Yi's advice, and had Cao Ren burn and abandon Xiangyang and Fancheng. As Sima Yi predicted, Sun Quan did not attack afterwards, and Cao Pi regretted not listening to him.

Throughout 220, Sima Yi served as one of the leading officials in court to urge Cao Pi's seizure of the throne, and was supported by other officials.

In late 220, Cao Pi usurped the throne from Emperor Xian, ending the Eastern Han dynasty, and declared himself emperor of the newly established state of Wei. Cao Pi first appointed Sima Yi as a Master of Writing (尚書) but later reassigned him as an Army Inspector (督軍) and Palace Assistant Imperial Clerk (御史中丞). He promoted Sima Yi from a village marquis to a district marquis under the title "District Marquis of Anguo" (安國鄉侯).

In 221, Sima Yi was removed from his post as an Army Inspector, and was appointed as a Palace Attendant and Right Supervisor of the Masters of Writing (尚書右僕射). This was a position of considerable influence, one of the assistant managers of the Imperial Secretariat, responsible for imperial correspondence and edicts.

In 222, when Cao Pi visited Wan, either because the city was not celebratory enough or because a local market had failed to produce a type of medicine Cao Pi had requested, the Governor of Nanyang Yang Jun (楊俊) under whose authority the city fell, was arrested. Sima Yi, among other officials, was on good terms with Yang Jun, whom he had met during his youth (they were both from Henei Commandery) and considered capable and intelligent, and pleaded on his behalf; knocking his forehead on the ground until it started bleeding, but Cao Pi dismissed the appeal. Yang Jun, admitting he was at fault, committed suicide. Sima Yi was greatly saddened at such a loss.

Two years later, in September 224, Cao Pi toured the south to inspect his forces near the border between Wei and Wu border. Sima Yi remained behind to defend Xuchang and his marquis title was changed to "District Marquis of Xiang" (向鄉侯).

In early 225, he was appointed General Who Pacifies the Army (撫軍將軍) and placed in command of 5,000 troops, and also held the positions of Official Who Concurrently Serves in the Palace (給事中) and Manager of the Affairs of the Masters of Writing (錄尚書事), a promotion from his prior office. When Sima Yi declined to accept these appointments, Cao Pi told him; "I have been busy with the affairs of state all day into the night, with no moment to rest. This isn't a commendation: just sharing the burden."

The next year, Cao Pi led his armies to attack Sun Quan, and left Sima Yi behind to defend and govern the imperial capital in his absence, as well as providing reinforcements and supplies for his armies at the frontline. Before departing, Cao Pi issued a decree; "I am deeply concerned about my posterity. This is why I entrust you with this responsibility. Even though Cao Shen made many contributions on the battlefield, Xiao He played a more important role than him. Would that I could but be free of looking back over my shoulder at the west (referring to Shu Han)!" Cao Pi later returned from Guangling Commandery to Luoyang. He told Sima Yi, "When I am in the east, you will be in charge of the west; when I am in the west, you will be in charge of the east." Sima Yi remained behind to guard Xuchang.

In mid 226, when Cao Pi became critically ill, he summoned Sima Yi, Cao Zhen, Chen Qun, and possibly Cao Xiu to meet him in the south hall of Chonghua Palace (崇華殿), where he ordered them to assist his son Cao Rui after his death. Cao Pi also told Cao Rui; "There may be those who would alienate these Three Excellencies from you, but be careful and do not doubt them".

== Service under Cao Rui ==
=== Driving back Wu invaders ===
After Cao Rui became Emperor of Wei, he elevated Sima Yi from the status of a district marquis to a county marquis under the title "Marquis of Wuyang". Around that time, Sun Quan attacked Jiangxia Commandery and sent his generals Zhuge Jin and Zhang Ba (張霸) to attack Xiangyang. Sima Yi led Wei forces to resist the Wu invaders, defeated Zhuge Jin, and killed Zhang Ba and more than 1,000 Wu soldiers. In recognition of Sima Yi's efforts, Cao Rui promoted him to General of Agile Cavalry (驃騎將軍).

=== Suppressing Meng Da's rebellion ===
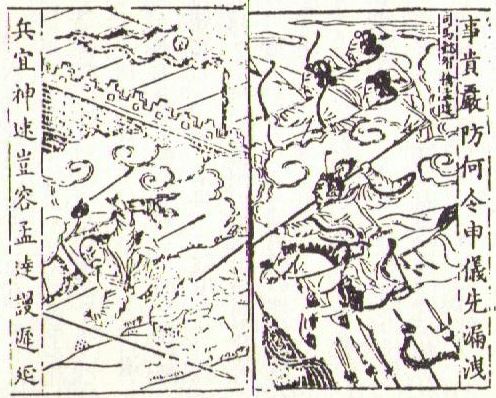
A Qing dynasty illustration of Meng Da's death at Xincheng.

In July 227, Cao Rui ordered Sima Yi to garrison at Wan, and put him charge of the military affairs of Jing and Yu provinces.

During Cao Pi's reign, Sima Yi had warned Cao Pi Meng Da, a former Shu general who had defected to Wei, was untrustworthy, but Cao Pi had ignored him. Sima Yi was proven right after Cao Pi's death when in late 227, Sima Yi received news Meng Da was planning to rebel against Wei and return to Shu; according to the Weilüe, he had sent his adviser Liang Ji (梁幾) to investigate Meng Da's case while urging Meng Da to visit Luoyang to attend to the Wei court, which alarmed the latter, persuading Meng Da to rebel.

According to the Book of Jin and Zizhi Tongjian, Sima Yi, upon hearing Meng Da wished to rebel, wrote a flattering letter to Meng Da to distract and confuse him while preparing to suppress the rebellion. While Meng Da was deciding whether to commit to his rebellion, Sima Yi swiftly assembled his troops and secretly led them to attack Meng Da's base in Shangyong Commandery (上庸郡; around present-day Zhushan County, Hubei). While heading towards the location, Sima Yi's subordinates suggested they observe Meng Da's actions first before advancing but Sima Yi replied, "[Meng] Da is not a trustworthy person. Now that he is hesitating due to suspicions, we should seize this opportunity to get rid of him." The marching speed was quickened and, covering 2,200 li, Sima Yi arrived within eight days and ordered his subordinates to lead separate detachments to intercept and block Meng Da's reinforcements in the form of Shu and Wu forces that had just arrived at Anqiao (安橋) and Mulan Fort (木闌塞) in Xicheng (西城) respectively.

Meng Da was taken by surprise, having not expected Sima Yi to appear so quickly at Shangyong Commandery. Meng Da was surrounded on three sides by a river so he set up wooden barriers to defend himself. Sima Yi's forces crossed the rivers, destroyed the barriers, and arrived just outside Shangyong. Sima Yi split up his forces and attacked the city from eight directions for over two weeks. On the sixteenth day, Meng Da's nephew Deng Xian (鄧賢) and subordinate Li Fu (李輔) opened the city gates and surrendered to Sima Yi. Meng Da was captured and executed, and his head was sent to the capital Luoyang; more than 10,000 captives were taken and Sima Yi returned to Wan in triumph.

=== Governing Jing and Yu provinces ===
While he was in charge of Jing and Yu provinces, Sima Yi encouraged and promoted agriculture, and reduced wastage of public funds. The people of the southern lands were happy and showed their support for him.

Shen Yi, a former subordinate of Meng Da, had remained in Weixing Commandery (魏興郡; around present-day Ankang, Shaanxi) and had become deeply entrenched there. Shen Yi had been illegally using the Wei emperor's name to carve official stamps and seals, and giving them to others. After hearing of Meng Da's fall, he became worried he would be the next target of Sima Yi's crackdown on traitorous officials. After Sima Yi had suppressed Meng Da's rebellion, many regional officials came to present gifts and congratulate him. Sima Yi sent a messenger to provoke Shen Yi and lure him into a trap. When Shen Yi went to confront Sima Yi, he was captured and sent to the imperial capital. Sima Yi relocated to You Province with more than 7,000 households from Shangyong Commandery. The Shu military officers Yao Jing (姚靜), Zheng Tuo (鄭他), and others later brought more than 7,000 men with them to surrender to Sima Yi.

Among the thousands of people who migrated to Wei from Shu, many were unregistered residents whom the Wei government wanted to register as citizens of Wei. The Wei emperor Cao Rui summoned Sima Yi back to Luoyang and sought his opinion on this issue. Sima Yi said: "The enemy seized these people through deception and now abandoned them. If we acknowledge their position in our great apparatus of state, they will naturally feel happy and at ease." Cao Rui then asked him which of Wei's two rival states (Wu and Shu) they should attack first. Sima Yi replied: "The people of Wu know that we in the Central States are not adept in naval warfare, hence they dare to live in Dongguan. When we attack an enemy, we should always block its throat and strike its heart. Xiakou and Dongguan are the enemy's heart and throat. If we can move our land forces to Wan (Note: This Wan (皖) was not the same place as Wan (宛; in present-day Nanyang, Henan), where Sima Yi was stationed at. This Wan (皖) referred to a location at present-day Qianshan County, Anhui.) to lure Sun Quan to advance east, then take advantage of his absence from Xiakou by sending our navy to attack it, it will be like an army from Heaven descending to attack, victory assured." Cao Rui agreed with Sima Yi's view and ordered him to return to his post at Wan.

Around August 228, during the time of the Battle of Shiting, records make brief mention of Sima Yi's involvement in the events by stating he led Wei forces into Jiangling.

=== Campaign against Shu ===
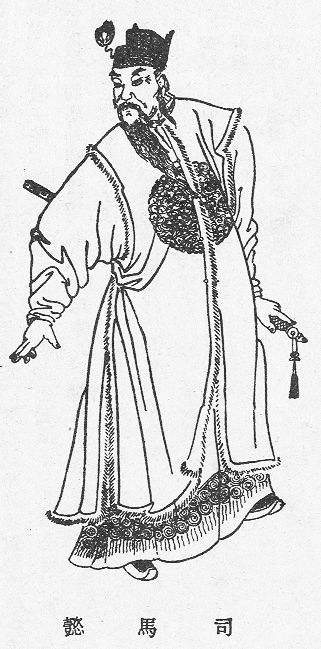
A portrait of Sima Yi from a Qing dynasty edition of the Romance of the Three Kingdoms

In March 230, Sima Yi was promoted to General-in-Chief (大將軍), appointed Grand Chief Controller (大都督) in charge of multiple commanderies, and – in a continuation of an extremely early tradition – bestowed a ceremonial yellow battle axe. The Wei emperor Cao Rui put him and Cao Zhen in charge of defending Wei's western borders from attacks by its rival state Shu, which had been launching invasions since 228. At Cao Zhen's instigation, a campaign against Shu was proposed and eventually implemented after Cao Rui approved his proposal. In August 230, Cao Zhen led an army from Chang'an to attack Shu via the Ziwu Valley (子午谷). At the same time, another Wei army led by Sima Yi, acting on Cao Rui's order, advanced towards Shu from Jing Province by sailing along the Han River. The rendezvous point for Cao Zhen and Sima Yi's armies was at Nanzheng. The army led by Sima Yi passed through Zhuoshan (斫山) and Xicheng County (西城縣; present-day Ankang, Shaanxi), sailed along the Mian River to Quren County (朐忍縣; west of Yunyang County, Chongqing), and arrived at Xinfeng County (新豐縣; south of Weinan, Shaanxi). He made camp at Dankou (丹口). Other Wei armies also prepared to attack Shu from the Xie Valley (斜谷) or Wuwei Commandery. The campaign, however, had to be aborted by October 230 because the gallery roads leading into Shu were too damaged for the troops to pass through, and because of constant heavy rain that had lasted for more than 30 days.

=== Battle of Mount Qi ===
In 231, Shu forces led by Zhuge Liang attacked Tianshui Commandery, and besieged Wei forces led by Jia Si (賈嗣) and Wei Ping (魏平) at Mount Qi (祁山; the mountainous regions around present-day Li County, Gansu). Cao Rui ordered Sima Yi to move to Chang'an to supervise military operations in Yong and Liang provinces. Sima Yi then ordered Fei Yao and Dai Ling to protect Shanggui County (上邽縣; in present-day Tianshui, Gansu) with 4,000 elite troops and set out with the rest of his men westward to relieve the mountainous battlefield. Zhang He wanted to take a detachment and station it at Yong and Mei counties but Sima Yi reasoned: "If the vanguard is able to face the enemy alone, your words are right; but should they not be able to do so, the dividing of the forces into vanguard and rear would be unwise; in this manner the Three Armies of Chu were captured by Qing Bu." After making preparations for battle, Sima Yi, with Zhang He, Fei Yao, Dai Ling (戴陵), and Guo Huai serving as his subordinates, led the Wei forces to Yumi County (隃麋縣; east of Qianyang County, Shaanxi) and stationed there.

When Zhuge Liang heard of the Wei army's arrival, he led his troops to Shanggui County to collect the harvest. Without good coordination, Sima Yi's subordinates defied his order to defend their positions; a detachment of the Wei army went to attack the Shu forces but were defeated, although accounts from the Book of Jin make no mention of a detachment being defeated, and records of the campaign tend to vary and prove unreliable. After defeating the enemy, Zhuge Liang foraged for the early spring wheat that was available in the vicinity. Sima Yi's subordinates feared losing the wheat but Sima Yi stated: "Zhuge Liang thinks too much and makes too few decisions. He'll be fortifying his camp and defences first before coming to harvest the wheat. Two days is sufficient for me [to reach Shanggui County]." He arrived within two days after travelling overnight. When Zhuge Liang and his men heard Sima Yi was marching towards their position, they swiftly retreated instead of giving battle. Initially, the Wei emperor Cao Rui wanted to supply Sima Yi's army with the wheat in Shanggui County and had rejected a proposal to transport grain from Guanzhong to the front line. Zhuge Liang's movements, however, were quicker than Cao Rui anticipated; only a portion of the wheat produce in Shanggui County was left after the Shu army's harvesting. The Wei general Guo Huai then asserted his influence over local nomadic tribes and forced them to hand over food supplies for the Wei army. The Wei army was thus able to gain access to food supplies without assistance from the central government in Luoyang.

Sima Yi again encountered Zhuge Liang, this time east of Shanggui County at Hanyang (漢陽) but no direct engagement occurred; Sima Yi drew in his troops and put them into formation while waiting, finding protection in the nearby defiles; concurrently he sent Niu Jin to lead a lightly armed cavalry detachment to lure the enemy to Mount Qi, who in the process briefly engaged in battle with Shu vanguard commander Ma Dai and inflicted some losses on the enemy. Zhuge Liang simultaneously withdrew his forces and Sima Yi thereafter closely followed Zhuge Liang from the rear. Zhang He advised against pursuit on grounds they could effectively station at Mount Qi, combine their forces, and conduct irregular expeditions; Zhuge Liang's provisions were running low and he would soon be forced to retreat, but Sima Yi did not heed this advice and continued his pursuit. Zhuge Liang ordered a retreat towards the eastern side of the Mount Qi ridges, where the Shu army fortified at Lucheng (鹵城), seizing control of the hills in the north and south, and using the river as a natural barrier while pitching "covering camps" near the riverbank to take complete control of the water passage.

Although his subordinates repeatedly urged Sima Yi to attack the enemy, he was hesitant to do so after seeing the layout of the Shu camps in the hills. He relented when his subordinates criticised and mocked him by saying he would become a laughing stock if he refused to attack. Sima Yi sent Zhang He to attack the southern Shu camps that were guarded by Wang Ping while he led a frontal assault on Lucheng from the central avenue. In response, Zhuge Liang ordered Wei Yan, Wu Ban, and Gao Xiang to lead troops to engage and resist the enemy outside Lucheng. The Wei forces suffered an unexpected and large defeat: 3,000 soldiers were killed, and 5,000 suits of armour and 3,100 sets of hornbeam crossbows were seized by the Shu forces but Sima Yi retained a sizable army, which he led back to his camp.

Despite his victory, Zhuge Liang could not make use of the momentum to launch a major offensive on the enemy because his army was running low on supplies. The Book of Jin said Sima Yi launched an attack on the Shu garrisons at this juncture and captured the Shu "covering camps". Zhuge Liang abandoned Lucheng and retreated in the night but Sima Yi pursued him and inflicted roughly 10,000 casualties on the Shu army. This account from the Book of Jin is disputed by historians and is not included in the Zizhi Tongjian. According to the Records of the Three Kingdoms and Zizhi Tongjian, Zhuge Liang retreated due to a lack of supplies rather than defeat, and the Wei forces pursued him. The pursuit did not go completely smoothly for Wei; Sima Yi had ordered Zhang He to further pursue the enemy in an attempt to capitalise on their momentum. According to the Weilüe, Zhang He initially refused to obey Sima Yi's order and argued according to classical military doctrine, one should refrain from pursuing an enemy force retreating to its home territory. Sima Yi refused to listen and forced Zhang He to carry out this order. Zhang He fell into an ambush at Mumen Trail (木門道; in Tianshui, Gansu), where Zhuge Liang had ordered crossbowmen to hide on high ground and fire at approaching enemy forces when they entered a narrow defile. Zhang He died after a stray arrow hit him in the right knee. Regardless of this setback, Cao Rui sent an emissary to congratulate Sima Yi on his victory and rewarded him by adding more taxable households to his marquisate.

Sima Yi's advisors Du Xi and Xue Ti (薛悌) told Sima Yi the wheat would be ready for harvest the following year and Zhuge Liang would be sure to come seize it. Because Longyou lacked food supplies, they should transport the wheat there that winter. Sima Yi said: "Zhuge Liang advanced towards Mount Qi again and attacked Chencang [陳倉; east of Baoji, Shaanxi] but lost and withdrew. If he advances again, instead of attacking cities, he will call for a battle in the east of Longyou and not the west. Zhuge Liang feels frustrated whenever there is shortage of grain, so he will stockpile supplies when he returns [to Shu]. I predict he won't attack again without at least three harvests' worth of food supplies." Sima Yi then proposed to the Wei imperial court to mobilise farmers from Ji Province to Shanggui County and put them under the jurisdiction of Jingzhao, Tianshui, and Nan'an (南安) commanderies. By 233, Sima Yi's agricultural plan came to fruition and became a source of food supplies for the three commanderies.

=== Battle of Wuzhang Plains ===
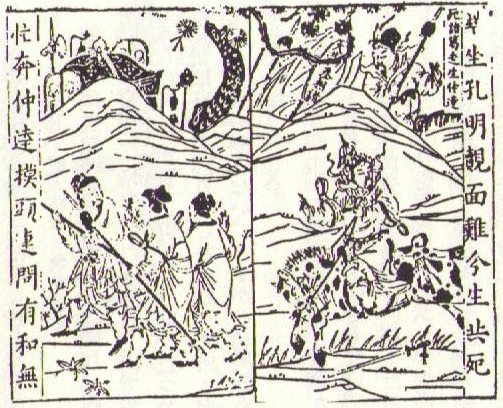
A Qing dynasty illustration of "a dead Zhuge drives away a living Zhongda".

In March or April 234, Zhuge Liang led up to 100,000 Shu troops out of the Xie Valley (斜谷) and camped at the southern bank of the Wei River near Mei County.

Sima Yi's subordinates wanted to station their camp north of the Wei River but Sima Yi said: "Many civilians have gathered at the south of the Wei River. That is certain to be a hotly contested location." Sima Yi then led his troops across the river, took up his position with his rear facing the river, and began constructing fortifications. He also said: "If Zhuge Liang is brave enough, he'll move out from Wugong County and head eastward in the direction of the mountains. If he moves west to the Wuzhang Plains, we'll have no worries." Around that time, the Wei emperor Cao Rui became worried and decided to send the general Qin Lang to lead 20,000 infantry and cavalry as reinforcements to join Sima Yi.

While Sima Yi and his troops were stationed at the south of the Wei River, Guo Huai urged him and the officers to move a detachment to the plains on the river's north bank because he foresaw Zhuge Liang would attempt to seize the plains. When the other officers disagreed, Guo Huai stated: "If Zhuge Liang crosses the Wei River and occupies those plains, his troops will have access to the mountains in the north. If they block the road through the mountains, it will cause fear and panic among the people living in the region. This isn't helpful to our state." Sima Yi finally agreed with Guo Huai and sent him to occupy the plains. While Guo Huai and his men were building a camp on the plains, they came under attack by Shu forces but drove them back.

Zhuge Liang moved his army west to the Wuzhang Plains and prepared to cross to the northern bank of the Wei River. Sima Yi sent Zhou Dang (周當) to station at Yangsui (陽遂; the area north of the Wei River in present-day Mei and Fufeng counties in Shaanxi) and lure Zhuge Liang to attack him. Zhuge Liang, however, did not mobilise his troops for several days. Sima Yi said: "Zhuge Liang wants to take control of the Wuzhang Plains and won't advance towards Yangsui. His intention is obvious." He then sent Hu Zun and Guo Huai to defend Yangsui. Several days later, Guo Huai received news Zhuge Liang was planning to launch an attack in the west and Guo Huai's subordinates wanted to strengthen their defences in the west. Guo Huai was the only one who recognised it was a ruse and that Zhuge Liang was planning to attack Yangsui. He was proven right later as the Shu forces attacked Yangsui at night. Because Guo Huai had earlier set up defences, the Shu forces failed to capture Yangsui. Zhuge Liang could not advance further so he retreated to the Wuzhang Plains.

One night, Sima Yi saw a meteor falling towards the Shu camp and predicted Zhuge Liang would be defeated. He ordered a surprise attack on the Shu camp from behind; 500 Shu soldiers were killed, 600 surrendered, and Wei forces captured more than 1,000 livestock of the Shu army. This account, which comes from the Book of Jin, is not included in the Zizhi Tongjian. Rather, the accounts from the Records of the Three Kingdoms were included in the Zizhi Tongjian.

The Wei government observed because the Shu army was far away from its base at Hanzhong Commandery, it would not be in its interest to fight a prolonged war in enemy territory so it would be better for the Wei army to adopt a defensive posture against the Shu invaders. Cao Rui thus ordered Sima Yi to hold his position and refrain from engaging the Shu forces in battle. Zhuge Liang attempted to lure Sima Yi to attack him; on one occasion, Zhuge Liang sent Sima Yi women's ornaments to taunt him. Sima Yi, apparently feeling enraged, sought permission from Cao Rui to attack the enemy but this was denied. The emperor sent Xin Pi, bearing the imperial sceptre—a symbol of the emperor's authority—to the battlefield to make sure Sima Yi followed orders and remained in camp. Zhuge Liang knew Sima Yi was pretending to be angry because he wanted to show the Wei soldiers he would not put up with the enemy's taunting and to ensure the Wei soldiers were ready for battle.

According to the Book of Jin, when Sima Fu wrote to his brother Sima Yi to ask about the situation at Wuzhang Plains, Sima Yi replied: "Zhuge Liang has big ambitions but fails to recognise opportunities. Always scheming but indecisive, he dallies impotently at combat. Though in command of 100,000 troops, he has played right into my plans and faces certain defeat." When Zhuge Liang's envoy visited Sima Yi's camp, the latter inquired about his adversary's sleeping and eating habits, and how busy he was. When told how Zhuge Liang consumed little and did not sleep much, Sima Yi said to his men: "Zhuge Kongming takes little food and does much work; how can he last long?"

According to at least one source, Sima Yi continued to provoke Zhuge Liang. Sima Yi reportedly made some 2,000 people cheer by the south-east corner of the military compound. When Zhuge Liang sent a man to inquire on the situation, he stated: "Eastern Wu's envoy came and said he would surrender." Zhuge Liang responded: "Eastern Wu will not surrender. Sima Yi is an old man who will soon be 60 years old, does he really need to use such a trick?"

After a standoff lasting more than 100 days, Sima Yi heard from civilians Zhuge Liang had died from illness and the Shu army had burnt down their camp and retreated. He then led his troops to pursue the enemy and caught up with them but withdrew when the Shu forces got into battle formation. Some days later, Sima Yi surveyed the remains of the Shu camp and said; "He was a genius". He also concluded Zhuge Liang was indeed dead when he saw the Shu army had hastily retreated. Xin Pi felt they could not yet be certain about Zhuge Liang's death but Sima Yi said: "The most important things in an army are its documents, troops, horses, and supplies. [Zhuge Liang] has abandoned all of them. How can a person lose his five most important organs and still be alive? We should quickly pursue (the enemy)." The ground in the Guanzhong region was full of Tribulus terrestris – a ground level plant with spiky burrs – so Sima Yi sent 2,000 men wearing wooden clogs with flat soles to clear the path before his main army advanced and continued pursuing the enemy, although he retreated when he encountered the Shu forces. When Sima Yi reached Chi'an (赤岸), he asked the residents there about Zhuge Liang and heard there was a saying: "A dead Zhuge scares away a living Zhongda". (Note: "Zhongda" was Sima Yi's courtesy name.) When Sima Yi heard that, he laughed and said: "That's because I can predict the living; I can't predict the dead."

In 235, Sima Yi was promoted to Grand Commandant and had the number of taxable households in his marquisate increased. In the same year, when the Shu general Ma Dai led troops to invade Wei, Sima Yi sent Niu Jin to lead Wei forces to resist the invaders. Niu Jin defeated Ma Dai and killed more than 1,000 enemy soldiers. However, this account from the Book of Jin is not referenced in the Zizhi Tongjian. When a famine broke out in North China Plain, Sima Yi had more than five million hu (Note: Five million hu is nearly ten km^{3}, and would require close to 13,000 modern intermodal shipping containers to accommodate.) of grain transported from Chang'an to Luoyang to aid in disaster relief efforts.

Around this time, Sima Yi established a military market at Chang'an. When an official named Yan Fei (顏斐) reported that the soldiers were insulting the people living there, he summoned the market captain and personally flogged him 100 times in front of Yan Fei, and thereafter strictly supervised the conduct of all the officials and soldiers.

=== Liaodong campaign ===
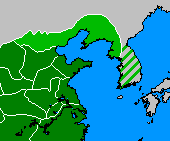
Gongsun-controlled territory (light green, approximate).

In 236, Sima Yi caught a white deer, which was regarded as an auspicious animal, and presented it to the Wei emperor Cao Rui, who said: "When the Duke of Zhou assisted King Cheng in governance, he presented white pheasants to the king. Now you are in charge of Shaanxi and you present a white deer. Isn't this a sign of loyalty, cooperation, long-lasting stability, and peace?" Later, when Cao Rui asked for capable and virtuous men to be recommended to him, Sima Yi recommended Wang Chang.

Gongsun Yuan, a warlord based in Liaodong Commandery who previously pledged allegiance to the Wei state, started a rebellion and declared independence, defeating the general Guanqiu Jian in an engagement.

In January 238, Cao Rui summoned Sima Yi to Luoyang to lead a campaign against Liaodong. When asked by the emperor how Gongsun Yuan would respond, Sima Yi stated he may either flee, resist, or defend his capital city; the final option being the worst choice, and the most likely to be used against Sima Yi after some initial resistance. When the emperor asked how long it would take, Sima Yi said he needed one year to lead the troops to Liaodong, to suppress the revolt, and to then return and repose. The Wei government had conscripted many men into military service or recruited them for manual labour to work on Cao Rui's palace construction and renovation projects. Sima Yi felt doing so would increase the burden on the common people and make them resent the Wei government so he advised Cao Rui to halt the projects and focus on dealing with more pressing issues.

Thereafter, Sima Yi, with Niu Jin and Hu Zun (胡遵) serving as his subordinates, set out with an army of 40,000 men from Luoyang to attack Liaodong. Cao Rui saw him off at Luoyang's Ximing Gate (西明門), where he ordered Sima Yi's brother Sima Fu and son Sima Shi, as well as other officials to attend the ceremony. During the extensive and lively festivities, in which Sima Yi met with elders and old friends, he began sighing and, feeling emotional and dissatisfied, sang a song:

天地開闢，
日月重光。
遭遇際會，
畢力遐方。
將掃羣穢，
還過故鄉。
肅清萬里，
總齊八荒。
告成歸老，
待罪舞陽。

— Book of Jin 648, vol. 1
Translation:

Heaven and Earth unfold and open up,
(the) Sun and Moon are very bright.
Coming to a border meeting,
a final effort in distant lands.
(I am) about to seep away the dirty pack, returning to pass by the old hometown.
Respectful and pure for ten thousand li,
all equally in every direction.
Announcing success and returning in old age, awaits not in (my fief of) Wuyang.

Sima Yi advanced with the army, which would later be reinforced by Guanqiu Jian's forces in You Province, which included the Xianbei auxiliary led by Mohuba, ancestor of the Murong clan. The Wei army reached Liaodong in June 238 and as Sima Yi had anticipated, Gongsun Yuan had sent his Grand General Bei Yan (卑衍) and Yang Zuo (楊祚) to face him. They built their camps along the Liao River to await Sima Yi's arrival. The Wei generals wanted to attack the enemy on the river's banks but Sima Yi reasoned attacking the encampment would only wear themselves out and deplete their valuable resources; because the bulk of the Liaodong army was at the Liao River, Gongsun Yuan's headquarters at Xiangping, the capital of the Liaodong Commandery, would be comparatively empty and the Wei army could take it with ease.

Sima Yi decided to dispatch Hu Zun with a contingent of his army south with banners and drums to indicate he was going to make a sortie there with a large force. This deceived Bei Yan and his men, who pursued the decoy unit, whereby Hu Zun, having lured the enemy, crossed the river and broke through Bei Yan's line. Sima Yi secretly crossed the river to the north, sank the boats, burnt down the bridges, built a long barricade along the river, and then marched for the capital. Once the opposing generals realised they had fallen for a ruse, they started marching in haste towards the capital. In the night, while heading north to intercept Sima Yi as had been expected of them, they caught up at Mount Shou (首山; a mountain west of Xiangping), where Bei Yan was ordered to give battle, and was subsequently defeated by Sima Yi and his army. Sima Yi then marched towards Xiangping unopposed, and started besieging it.

July brought the summer monsoons, which a year earlier had impeded Guanqiu Jian's campaign. Heavy ran fell for more than a month so even ships could sail the length of the flooded Liao River from its mouth at Liaodong Bay up to the walls of Xiangping. Despite the water being several feet high on level ground, Sima Yi was determined to maintain the siege regardless of the clamours of his officers, who proposed changing camps. Sima Yi threatened to execute those who advocated for the idea, such as the officer Zhang Jing, who violated the order. The rest of the officers subsequently became silent.

Because of the floods, the encirclement of Xiangping was incomplete and the defenders used the flood to their advantage to sail out to forage and pasture their animals. Sima Yi forbade his generals from pursuing the foragers and herders from Xiangping, and upon being questioned by one of his subordinates, stated: "Meng Da's multitudes were small, but he had food and supplies for a year. My generals and soldiers were four times those of Da, but with provisions not even for a full month. Using one month to plot against one year, how could I not be quick? To use four to strike against one, if it merely makes half be eliminated, I would still do it. In this case, I consider not calculations on death and injuries, I compete against provisions. Now, the rebels are numerous and we are few; the rebels are hungry and we are full. With flood and rain like this, we cannot employ our effort. Even if we take them, what is the use? Since I left the capital, I have not worried about the rebels attacking us, but have been afraid they might flee. Now, the rebels are almost at their extremity as regards supplies, and our encirclement of them is not yet complete. By plundering their cattle and horses or capturing their fuel-gatherers, we will be only compelling them to flee. War is an art of deception; we must be good at adapting ourselves to changing situations. Relying on their numerical superiority and helped by the rain, the rebels, hungry and distressed as they are, are not willing to give up. We must make a show of inability to put them at ease; to alarm them by taking petty advantages is not the plan at all."

Officials in the Wei imperial court in Luoyang were also concerned about the floods and proposed recalling Sima Yi. The Wei emperor, Cao Rui, being certain of Sima Yi's abilities, turned down the proposal. Around this time, the Goguryeo king sent a noble (大加; taeka) and the Keeper of Records (主簿 jubu) of the Goguryeo court with several thousand men to aid Sima Yi.

On 3 September, a comet was seen in the skies of Xiangping and was interpreted as an omen of destruction by those in the Liaodong camp. A frightened Gongsun Yuan sent his Chancellor of State Wang Jian (王建) and Imperial Counsellor Liu Fu (柳甫) to negotiate the terms of surrender, where he promised to present himself bound to Sima Yi once the siege was lifted. Sima Yi, wary of Gongsun Yuan's double-crossing past, executed the two, saying in a message to Gongsun Yuan he desired an unconditional surrender: "In ancient times, Chu and Zheng were classed as states of equal footing, yet the Earl of Zheng nevertheless met the Prince of Chu with his flesh bare and leading a sheep. I am a superior Ducal Minister of the Son of Heaven, yet Wang Jian and his following wanted me to raise the siege and withdraw my men. Is this proper? These two men were dotards who must have failed to convey your intentions; I have already put them to death (on your behalf). If you still have anything to say, then send a younger man of intelligence and precision."

When Gongsun Yuan sent Wei Yan (衛演) for another round of talks, this time asking permission to send a hostage to the Wei court, Sima Yi dismissed the final messenger as a waste of time: "In military affairs there are five essential points. If able to fight, you must fight. If not able to fight, you must defend. If not able to defend, you must flee. The remaining two points entail only surrender or death. Now that you are not willing to come bound, you are determined to have death; there is no need of sending any hostage." Sima Yi's previous suggestion of further negotiations was an act of malice that gave false hope to Gongsun Yuan while prolonging the siege and placing further strain on the supplies within the city.

When the rain stopped and the floodwater receded, Sima Yi hastened to complete the encirclement of Xiangping. The siege continued day and night using mining, hooked ladders, battering rams, and artificial mounds for siege towers and [ to get higher vantage points. The speed at which the siege was tightened caught the defenders off guard; because they had been obtaining supplies with such ease during the flood, there was apparently no real attempt to stockpile the goods inside Xiangping. As a result, famine and cannibalism broke out in the city. Many Liaodong generals, such as Yang Zuo, surrendered to Sima Yi during the siege.

On 29 September, the famished Xiangping fell to the Wei army. Gongsun Yuan and his son Gongsun Xiu (公孫脩), leading a few hundred horsemen, broke out of the encirclement and fled to the southeast. The main Wei army gave pursuit, and killed both father and son on the Liang River (梁水; now known as Taizi River). Gongsun Yuan's head was cut off and sent to Luoyang for public display. A separate fleet led by future Grand Administrators Liu Xin (劉昕) and Xianyu Si (鮮于嗣) had been sent to attack the Korean commanderies of Lelang and Daifang by sea. Eventually, all of Gongsun Yuan's former holdings were subjugated.

After Sima Yi's army occupied Xiangping, he erected a pair of guideposts to separate recent and long-serving government officials, and military personnel of Gongsun Yuan's disestablished regime, and ordered a systematic purge of 2,000 officials. He also had some 7,000 men aged 15 and above from within the city executed and raised a jingguan (京觀, a victory mound) with their corpses while pardoning the remaining survivors. In total, Sima Yi's conquest gained Wei an additional 40,000 households and over 300,000 citizens, although Sima Yi did not encourage these frontier settlers to continue their livelihoods in the Chinese northeast; he ordered those families who wished to return to central China be allowed to do so. Sima Yi also posthumously rehabilitated and erected mounds over the graves of Lun Zhi (倫直) and Jia Fan (賈範), two officials who had attempted to stop Gongsun Yuan from rebelling but were executed by him. Sima Yi also freed Gongsun Gong, the previous Administrator of Liaodong, who had been imprisoned by his nephew Gongsun Yuan. All of this was carried out under an order that stated: "During the ancients' attacks on states, they executed their fiercest enemies, (Note: Literally: "whales" (鯨鯢)) and that was all. Those who were deceived and misled by Wenyi, all are forgiven. People of the Central States who desire to return to their old hometowns are free to do so."

Because it was winter, many soldiers were suffering from the cold and wanted extra clothing. When someone said they had a surplus of ru and suggested giving them to the soldiers, Sima Yi said: "The padded coats are the property of the government. No one is allowed to give them to others without permission." Sima Yi ordered all soldiers aged 60 and above, numbering over 1,000 men, to retire from their service, and for the dead and wounded to be sent home. As Sima Yi led the troops back to Luoyang from Liaodong, Cao Rui sent an emissary to meet them in Ji and host a victory celebration. He also added Kunyang County (昆陽縣; present-day Ye County, Henan) to Sima Yi's marquisate so Sima Yi had two counties as his marquisate.

=== Appointment as regent ===
When Sima Yi arrived at Xiangping, he dreamt Cao Rui asked him to look at his face, which appeared different than usual, and Sima Yi sensed something was wrong. Later, when Sima Yi was in Ji County (汲縣; in present-day Xinxiang, Henan), Cao Rui issued an imperial order instructing him to return to Luoyang via a faster route through the Guanzhong region. When Sima Yi reached Baiwu (白屋), he received another five orders within three days. Sensing the urgency of the situation, he boarded a zhuifengche (Note: A zhuifengche (追鋒車) was a light, fast-moving horse-drawn carriage or chariot. See the dictionary definition.) and travelled overnight across the Baiwu region over a distance of more than 400 li, stopping only once for a brief rest, and reached Luoyang the following day. Upon arrival, Sima Yi was led to the bedroom of the Jiafu Hall (嘉福殿) in the imperial palace to meet Cao Rui and saw the emperor was critically ill. With tears in his eyes, Sima Yi asked Cao Rui about his condition. Cao Rui held Sima Yi's hand and told him: "I have matters to entrust you. Now that I meet you one last time before I die, I have no more regrets." Cao Rui called into his chambers the Prince of Qin, Cao Xun, and the Prince of Qi, Cao Fang, and while pointing towards Cao Fang stated: "This is he. Look at him carefully and do not make any mistake." Cao Rui had Cao Fang embrace Sima Yi's neck. Sima Yi hit his forehead on the floor and started weeping. Cao Rui thereafter designated Sima Yi as a co-regent for the young Cao Fang alongside the general Cao Shuang, who had already been designated for the position.

Before his death, Cao Rui had planned to exclude Sima Yi from the regency and instead appoint Cao Yu, Xiahou Xian (夏侯獻), Cao Shuang, Cao Zhao, and Qin Lang as the regents. Two of his close aides, Liu Fang (劉放) and Sun Zi (孫資), who were not on good terms with Xiahou Xian and Cao Zhao, persuaded Cao Rui to exclude those two, and Qin Lang and Cao Yu, thereby having Cao Shuang and Sima Yi appointed as the regents instead.

== Service under Cao Fang ==
In early 239, when Cao Fang became the new Wei emperor, the Wei government appointed Sima Yi as Palace Attendant and Manager of the Affairs of the Imperial Secretariat (錄尚書事), granted him imperial authority, and ordered him to oversee military affairs within and outside Luoyang. Sima Yi and Cao Shuang each held command over 3,000 troops, and served as regents for the underage emperor. Because Cao Shuang wanted the Masters of Writing (or Imperial Secretariat) to report to him first, he proposed to the imperial court to reassign Sima Yi to be the Grand Marshal (大司馬). The previous Grand Marshals had all died in office so the imperial court thought it would be more appropriate to appoint Sima Yi as Grand Tutor (太傅) instead. Sima Yi was also awarded additional privileges similar to those granted to Xiao He in the early Western Han dynasty and Cao Cao in the late Eastern Han dynasty: He did not have to walk briskly when he entered the imperial court, did not have to have his name announced when he entered, and was allowed to wear shoes and carry a sword into the imperial court. His eldest son Sima Shi was appointed as a Regular Mounted Attendant (散騎常侍) while three of his relatives were enfeoffed as marquises and four others were appointed as Cavalry Commandants (騎都尉). Sima Yi ordered his relatives to decline the honours and appointments.

In the spring of 239, the Wa, Karasahr, Weixu (危須) states and the Xianbei tribes living south of the Ruo River came to pay tribute to the Cao Wei state. Cao Fang attributed this to the efforts of his subjects and he rewarded Sima Yi by increasing the number of taxable households in his marquisate. Sima Yi also suggested the Wei imperial court put an end to the extravagant palace construction and renovation projects started in Cao Rui's reign, and divert those resources and manpower to agriculture. The imperial court approved.

=== Battles in Jing Province ===
Around late May or June 241, Wu launched an invasion of Wei on three fronts: Quebei (芍陂; south of present-day Shou County, Anhui), Fancheng, and Zhazhong (柤中; west of present-day Nanzhang County, Hubei). When Sima Yi asked permission to lead troops to resist the enemy, officials in the imperial court argued there was no need to take swift action because Fancheng was strong enough to withstand attacks and because the enemy was weary after travelling a long distance. Sima Yi disagreed and said: "In Zizhong the Chinese people and the barbarians number a hundred thousand; south of the water they wander and roam without a master over them. Fancheng has been under attack more than a month without relief. This is a precarious situation. I ask to lead a campaign myself."

In late June or July 241, Sima Yi led an army from Luoyang to fight the Wu invaders. The Wei emperor Cao Fang saw him off at Luoyang's Jinyang Gate (津陽門). Upon reaching Fancheng, Sima Yi knew he should not linger for too long because of the heat of summer. He sent a lightly armed cavalry detachment to harass the Wu forces while his main army remained in position. Later, he ordered his tired troops to rest and bathe while a remaining group of personally chosen forces and enlisted volunteers were ordered to climb Fancheng's city walls to reinforce the city and curb the enemy's siege. The Wu forces led by Zhu Ran retreated overnight upon hearing of this. Sima Yi and the Wei forces pursued the retreating Wu forces to the confluence of the Han, Bai, and Tang rivers, where they defeated and killed over 10,000 enemy soldiers and captured their boats, equipment, and other resources. Cao Fang sent his Palace Attendant as an emissary to meet Sima Yi at Wan to congratulate him and host a banquet to celebrate the victory.

In August 241, the Wei imperial court added two counties to Sima Yi's marquisate as a reward for his contributions; Sima Yi's marquisate now spanned four counties and covered 10,000 taxable households. Eleven of Sima Yi's relatives were also enfeoffed as marquises. As Sima Yi gained greater glory for his achievements, he behaved in a more humble manner, He also constantly reminded his siblings, children, and younger relatives to be mindful of their conduct. In early 242, Cao Fang bestowed the posthumous title "Marquis Cheng of Wuyang" (舞陽成侯) upon Sima Yi's deceased father Sima Fang.

=== Promoting agriculture in the Huai River region ===
According to the Book of Jin, in April or May 242, Sima Yi proposed to the Wei government the digging of a canal to connect the Yellow and Bian rivers and direct their waters towards the southeast to promote agriculture north of the Huai River.

An account from the Zizhi Tongjian places this event somewhere in 241; in this account, Deng Ai proposed the idea of building such a canal to Sima Yi, who only thereafter petitioned the state. The agricultural project was begun and eventually completed, and whenever there was a battle in the southeast between the Wei and Wu armies, Wei troops could quickly travel downstream towards the Huai River to counter the enemy. The abundance of food resources and waterways in the upper stream were advantageous for the Wei forces.

Around that time, the Wu general Zhuge Ke was stationed at a military garrison at Wan (皖; near Qianshan County, Anhui) and posed a threat to the Wei forces in the region. When Sima Yi wanted to lead troops to attack Zhuge Ke, many officials advised him against it. They said Wan was heavily fortified and abundant in supplies, and that Wu reinforcements would come to Zhuge Ke's aid if he came under attack, thus putting the invaders in a perilous position. Sima Yi disagreed and said: "The enemy's strength is in naval warfare. Why don't we try attacking their land garrison and gauge their reaction? If they know their strengths, they will abandon the garrison and retreat; this is our objective. If they hold up inside the garrison and defend their position, their reinforcements will have to reach them via land because the waters are too shallow in winter for boats to sail through. They will be forced to abandon their strength and act from their weakness, to our benefit."

In October 243, Sima Yi led an army from Luoyang to attack Zhuge Ke at Wan. When Sima Yi and his army reached Shu County (舒縣; near Shucheng County, Anhui), Zhuge Ke, upon being instructed by Sun Quan to not give battle and instead station at Chaisang (柴桑), gave orders to burn the supplies stockpiled in Wan, abandon the garrison, and retreat.

Sima Yi's aim was to destroy the Wu forces' sources of food in the Huai River region so once Zhuge Ke burnt the supplies in Wan, Sima Yi felt more at ease. He then implemented the tuntian policy of agricultural military colonies, alongside large-scale agricultural and irrigation works in the region. In late January or February 244, Cao Fang sent an emissary to meet Sima Yi at Huainan Commandery and honour him for his achievements in promoting agriculture in the region.

=== Struggle with Cao Shuang ===
Throughout the early years of Cao Shuang and Sima Yi's co-regency, the former attempted to consolidate his political influence while only briefly paying respect to Sima Yi based on his status and seniority. Cao Shuang put his brothers in command of the military, promoted his close aides to higher positions in the imperial court, and made changes to the political structure to benefit himself and his clique. He also silenced those who stood against him, his associates, and their combined interests.

During this chain of events, Cao Shuang had Sima Yi appointed to the position of Grand Tutor under the guise of a promotion; while the position was an honourable one, it held almost no real authority and removed Sima Yi from the position of Manager of Affairs of the Imperial Secretariat, instead giving authority over the Secretariat to Cao Shuang. Through the careful appointing of some of Sima Yi's aides to certain positions, however, Sima Yi effectively retained much of his political influence and Cao Shuang's attempts at strengthening his grip on the political scene were somewhat mitigated. For instance, Deng Ai, a man with whom Sima Yi had previously grown acquainted and realising his talent, transferred him into his service, was eventually appointed to the position of Prefect of the Imperial Secretariat (尚書郎) in 241, gave Deng Ai the rank of Prefect of the Masters of Writing, allowing Sima Yi to still supervise the edicts and memorials. After the death of Man Chong in 242, one of Sima Yi's long-serving associates Jiang Ji was appointed to the position of Grand Commandant.

Throughout the 240s, as new groups of intellectuals largely headed by He Yan, an associate of Cao Shuang, sought to oppose traditional Confucian principles and discard "pointless" formalities in society, Sima Yi became a leading representative of men from good families who sought to promote the traditional type of Confucian morality, and restraint in politics and society.

In 244, the officials Deng Yang and Li Sheng advised Cao Shuang to launch a military campaign against Shu to boost his fame and authority in Wei. Sima Yi strongly objected to this idea but Cao Shuang ignored him and proceeded with the campaign. In April 244, Cau Shuang was defeated by Shu forces at the Battle of Xingshi. Sima Yi sent a letter to Cao Shuang's associate and uncle Xiahou Xuan reprimanding his faction's reckless actions because they could lead to destruction, referring to a historical precedent by stating Cao Cao almost suffered a total defeat in the war against Liu Bei for Hanzhong. The letter also said Shu forces were already occupying Mount Xingshi (興勢山; north of Yang County, Shaanxi), and if Cao Shuang's group failed to seize control of the area, they could have their retreat route cut off and their forces destroyed. Xiahou Xuan subsequently grew anxious and advised Cao Shuang to lead back his troops, which he eventually did by June or July of the same year, incurring further losses during his retreat.

In September 245, Cao Shuang wanted to alter the structure of the military so he could put his brothers Cao Xi (曹羲) and Cao Xun (曹訓) in command of troops. Sima Yi opposed these changes but Cao Shuang ignored him and went ahead. In January 246, the Wei emperor Cao Fang granted Sima Yi the privilege of riding to the imperial court in a type of horse-drawn carriage that was traditionally reserved for emperors.

In February 246, when Wu forces attacked Zhazhong, over 10,000 households living there fled to the north across the Mian River (沔水, a historical name for the Han River). When news of the Wu invasion reached the Wei imperial court, Sima Yi argued they should let the civilians remain on the northern side of the river because the southern side was near enemy territory and hence too dangerous for them. Cao Shuang, however, said: "It isn't in our long-term interests to allow the civilians to remain here and give up trying to secure the south of the Mian River". Sima Yi disagreed: "No. In every case, a safe place is safe, and a dangerous place is dangerous. Hence the military manuals state: 'Victory and defeat are manifestations; safety and danger are energies.' Manifestation of energy, from the emperor on down, this affects everyone. One cannot but take care about it. Suppose the enemy sends 20,000 troops to cut off passage across the Mian River, sends another 30,000 troops to fight our forces at the south of the Mian, and sends another 10,000 troops to occupy Zhazhong. What then can we do to save those civilians?" Cao Shuang refused and ordered the refugees to return to the southern side of the Mian River. As Sima Yi foresaw, Wu forces occupied Zhazhong, captured the civilians, and relocated them to Wu territory.

Around late May or early June 247, Cao Shuang wanted to further dominate the Wei government so he used a series of political manoeuvres to consolidate and concentrate power in himself and his clique. He heeded the advice of his close aides He Yan, Deng Yang, and Ding Mi (丁謐), and relocated Cao Rui's widow Empress Dowager Guo to Yongning Palace (永寧宮) so she could not interfere in politics. Sima Yi was unable to stop this, among other contrivances, putting severe stress on the relationship between him and Cao Shuang, who became increasingly distrustful and wary of Sima Yi. In June or July 247, Sima Yi said he was ill and withdrew from politics. (Note: At the time, Sima Yi was already around 68 years old, and it is probable he was suffering from a variety of health-related issues. Sima Yi's wife Zhang Chunhua had recently died so it is probable he was distraught at the death of his wife and went into mourning.)

The Princes of Qinghe and Pingyuan had been arguing among themselves with Sun Li, the governor of Ji Province, over a land dispute for the past eight years, after consulting with Sima Yi, arguing a map from the palace archives made during the time of the latter prince's enfeoffment should be used. This map would favour Pingyuan's claim but Cao Shuang preferred the plaint of the Prince of Qinghe and dismissed the appeal. Sun Li sent a memorial in a forceful tone and Cao Shuang, in anger, banished him from his position for five years. He was eventually reinstated as the governor of Bing Province, and visited Sima Yi before taking his leave. Sima Yi saw that something was amiss, and he asked him if he thought it a small thing to be made the governor of Bing Province, or if he instead felt regret for having got himself involved in this whole affair. Sun Li, in tears, said that he didn't take official ranks or past affairs to heart, but that he was worried about the dynasty's future. Sima Yi replied: "Stop for the time being, and bear the unbearable."

In April or May 248, Zhang Dang (張當), a palace eunuch, illegally transferred eleven women out of the imperial harem and presented them to Cao Shuang to be his concubines. Cao Shuang and his close aides thought Sima Yi was seriously ill and could no longer do anything so they plotted with Zhang Dang to overthrow the emperor Cao Fang and put Cao Shuang on the throne. They were still wary of Sima Yi, however, and did not lower their guard against him.

In late 248, Sima Yi, together with his eldest son Sima Shi, and with possibly his second eldest son Sima Zhao, began plotting against Cao Shuang (Note: Sima Shi was surely involved in the plotting with his father but it is uncertain how involved Sima Zhao was. The more traditional view, such as that espoused by Fang Xuanling, is Sima Zhao was not informed until the evening before the incident. Historians such as Sima Guang disregard this view and assert Sima Zhao was as deeply involved in the plot as his elder brother.)

=== Meeting with Li Sheng ===
Li Sheng, one of Cao Shuang's supporters, had been reassigned to be the Inspector of Jing Province. Cao Shuang secretly instructed him to check if Sima Yi was as ill as he claimed so Li Sheng visited Sima Yi before leaving for Jing Province. Sima Yi knew the true purpose of Li Sheng's visit so he pretended to be frail and senile. Li Sheng saw Sima Yi could not move around and wear clothes without help from his servants, and could not consume congee without soiling his clothes. He then told Sima Yi: "Everyone thought that your illness was a minor one; alas, who expected you to be in such poor health?" Sima Yi pretended to cough and pant as he replied: "I am old and sick. My death could come any day. When you go to Bing Province, you should be careful because it is near barbarian territory. We might not see each other again, so I entrust my sons Shi and Zhao to your care." Li Sheng corrected him: "I am returning to my home province, not Bing Province". Sima Yi pretended to mishear and continued saying: "You are going to Bing Province, aren't you?" Li Sheng corrected him again: "My home province is Jing Province". Sima Yi replied: "I am so old and weak that I can't even hear you properly. So now you are going back to your home province. It's time for you to make some glorious achievements!" Li Sheng returned to Cao Shuang and told him: "Lord Sima is like a corpse who still breathes. His spirit has already departed his body. He can't even think." Later, he said: "It's sad to see that the Grand Tutor will not be able to return to service". Thus duped, Cao Shuang and his associates lowered their guard against Sima Yi.

=== Seizing power ===
According to the Book of Jin, on the night of 4 February, the day before the planned coup, Sima Yi sent spies to monitor the behaviour of his two eldest children. In the early hours of the next morning, the spies reported to Sima Yi that Sima Shi went to bed as usual and slept peacefully whereas Sima Zhao, having supposedly only been informed of the plan during the prior evening, tossed and turned in his bed.

On 5 February 249, Cao Shuang and his brothers accompanied the emperor Cao Fang on a visit to Gaoping Mausoleum (高平陵) to pay their respects to the late emperor Cao Rui. (Note: The mausoleum was that of the late Cao Rui (Emperor Ming). The Wei Shi Ji (魏世籍) of Sun Sheng (孙盛) reads: "Gaoping ling is on Dashishan, south of the Luoshui and ninety li from the city of Luoyang.") On that day, Sima Yi seized the opportunity to stage a coup d'état against his co-regent. He went to Yongning Palace to meet Empress Dowager Guo to request the memorialisation of a decree ordering the removal of Cao Shuang and his brothers from power. Thereafter, the city gates were closed while Sima Shi's previously arranged 3,000 forces that had gathered at the Sima Gate (司馬門) under his command were led to occupy the palace gates. Sima Yi later commented: "This son really worked well." Soon, the troops were lined up along the palace grounds, passing through Cao Shuang's camp. Cao Shuang's Controller of Camp Yan Shi (嚴世) was on the upper floor, drawing his crossbow with the intent to shoot the passing Sima Yi. His colleague Sun Qian (孫謙) stopped him and said: "We don't know what's going on." Yan Shi thrice prepared to shoot the bow but did not shoot.

Meanwhile, Sima Yi granted imperial authority to Gao Rou the Minister over the Masses and appointed him as acting General-in-Chief (大將軍), and ordered him to take command of Cao Shuang's troops, stating: "You're now like Zhou Bo." Sima Yi also appointed Wang Guan the Minister Coachman (太僕), whom Sima Yi had previously recommended during Cao Rui's reign as acting Commandant of the Central Army (中領軍), and ordered him to seize command of the troops under Cao Shuang's brother Cao Xi (曹羲).

Sima Yi, along with the Grand Commandant Jiang Ji and others, led troops out of Luoyang to the pontoon bridge above the Luo River, where he sent a memorial to the emperor Cao Fang listing Cao Shuang's crimes—which included not fulfilling his duty as regent and corrupting the government, and conspiring against the throne—and asking the emperor to remove Cao Shuang and his brothers from their positions of power. Cao Shuang blocked the memorial from reaching Cao Fang and left the emperor at the south of the Yi River while ordering his men to cut down trees to build anti-cavalry blockades and station about 1,000 troops nearby to guard against Sima Yi's advances. Sima Yi sent Xu Yun (許允) and Chen Tai to persuade Cao Shuang to plead guilty as early as possible. Sima Yi also sent Yin Damu (尹大目), a man whom Cao Shuang trusted, to tell him nothing more would result from this aside from his dismissal. Huan Fan, the Minister of Finance (大司農), had left the city to visit Cao Shuang's camp, with Sima Yi commenting: "The 'bag of wisdom' is gone." Jiang Ji responded: "Huan Fan is indeed wise, but stupid horses are too much attached to the beans in their manger. Cao Shuang is certain not to employ his counsel." Huan Fan attempted to persuade Cao Shuang and his brothers to flee to Xuchang with the emperor, and to issue an edict denouncing Sima Yi as a traitor and drafting troops to fight back but they remained undecided. Cao Shuang ultimately surrendered to Sima Yi and gave up his powers, thinking he could still lead a luxurious life in retirement. Huan Fan scolded them, saying: "Cao Zhen was a good man, yet sired you and your brothers, little pigs and calves that you are! I never expected to be involved with you and have my family annihilated."

After returning to Luoyang, Cao Shuang and his brothers were carefully guarded, and on 9 February 249, (Note: Cao Fang's biography in the Sanguozhi recorded Cao Shuang and his associates Ding Mi (丁謐), Deng Yang, He Yan, Bi Gui, Li Sheng, and Huan Fan were executed along with their extended families on the wuxu day of the 1st month of the 1st year of the Jiaping era of Cao Fang's reign. This date corresponds to 9 February 249 in the Julian calendar.) Cao Shuang was accused of plotting treason after the palace eunuch Zhang Dang (張當), who had been sent to the tingyu, had testified Cao Shuang and his associates were planning to seize the throne for themselves. Cao Shuang was arrested along with his brothers and his supporters, including He Yan, Ding Mi, Deng Yang, Bi Gui, Li Sheng, and Huan Fan. They were subsequently executed with the rest of their families and relatives on the same day. Jiang Ji had attempted to persuade Sima Yi to spare Cao Shuang and his brothers in consideration of the meritorious service rendered by their father, Cao Zhen but Sima Yi refused. Two of Cao Shuang's subordinates Lu Zhi (魯芝) and Yang Zong (楊綜) had been implicated in the plot and were arrested as well, although Sima Yi pardoned them under the rationale: "Each of them was serving his own master."

Earlier, when Huan Fan escaped from Luoyang to join Cao Shuang, he encountered Si Fan (司蕃), who was guarding the Changping Gate. Because Si Fan used to serve under Huan Fan, Si Fan trusted Huan Fan and allowed him to pass through. Once he was out of Luoyang, Huan Fan turned back and told Si Fan: "The Imperial Tutor [Sima Yi] is planning to commit treason. You should come with me!" Si Fan, however, stayed behind and hid himself. After the coup d'état, Si Fan surrendered himself to Sima Yi and told him what happened earlier. Sima Yi asked: "What's the punishment for falsely accusing someone of treason?" The reply was: "According to the law, the one who makes the false accusation shall be punished for treason." Huan Fan was then executed along with the rest of his family.

Cao Shuang's younger cousin Cao Wenshu had perished and the family of his widowed wife, Xiahou Lingnü wanted to remarry her to someone else, in response to which she cut off her ears and later her nose. Her family asserted the Cao clan was exterminated but she retorted by saying: "I have heard that a person of worth does not renounce his principles because of changes in fortune, nor a righteous person change his mind with a view to preservation or destruction. While the Cao flourished, I was bent on keeping my chastity. Now that they have declined and perished, can I bear to renounce them? Even animals do not act this way; how can I?" When Sima Yi heard of this, he allowed her to adopt a son as an heir to the Cao clan. The contemporaneous Shu official and regent Fei Yi gave his own comment regarding the coup:

... If Sima Yi really considered Cao Shuang to be guilty of extravagance and arrogance, it would suffice for him to execute him according to the law. However, he exterminated even his infant children, branding them with the name of disloyalty, effectively wiping out Zidan's line. Also, He Yan's son was a nephew of the Wei ruler, and even he was killed. Sima Yi was assuming too much power and behaving improperly. —Fei Yi on Sima Yi's coup d'état.

On 18 February or sometime in March 249, Cao Fang appointed Sima Yi as Imperial Chancellor, and added another four counties to Sima Yi's marquisate, bringing the size of the marquisate to eight counties and 20,000 taxable households. Cao Fang also awarded Sima Yi the privilege of not having to announce his name when he spoke to the emperor. Sima Yi declined the appointment of Imperial Chancellor. In January or February 250, Cao Fang awarded Sima Yi the nine bestowments and an additional privilege of not having to kowtow during imperial court sessions. Sima Yi declined the nine bestowments. In February or March 250, Cao Fang had an ancestral shrine for the Sima family built in Luoyang, increased the size of Sima Yi's personal staff, promoted some of Sima Yi's personal staff, and enfeoffed Sima Yi's sons Sima Rong (司馬肜) and Sima Lun as village marquises. Because Sima Yi was chronically ill, he could not regularly attend imperial court sessions so Cao Fang often visited him at his residence to consult him on policy matters.

=== Suppressing Wang Ling's rebellion ===
Wang Ling the Grand Commandant and his nephew Linghu Yu (令狐愚) the Inspector of Yan Province became worried about Sima Yi's growing influence over the emperor Cao Fang, so they plotted to replace him with Cao Biao, the Prince of Chu, while instating his capital city as Xuchang, and then to overthrow Sima Yi. Linghu Yu, however, died in December 249 or January 250.

In February 251, Wang Ling either lied by stating Wu forces were approaching the Tu River (塗水) and requested the Wei government give him troops to resist the invaders or was telling the truth that they were obstructing the river, but wanted to use the troops for his own malicious purposes. Sima Yi was suspicious of Wang Ling's intention so he refused to approve the request. On 7 June 251, upon receiving intelligence of Wang Ling's plot from officials Yang Hong (楊弘) and Huang Hua (黃華), Sima Yi immediately mobilised troops to attack Wang Ling and travelled down the river while bestowing additional authority upon Zhuge Dan and ordering him to lead his own forces to encroach upon Wang Ling's position. Sima Yi issued a pardon to Wang Ling and sent a secretary to call for his surrender. Sima Yi's army reached Gancheng (甘城) within a few days and advanced to within 100 chi of Wang Ling's base to put pressure on him. Wang Ling knew Sima Yi was aware of his plans to rebel and that his own forces were too weak so he gave up, sent his subordinate Wang Yu (王彧) to apologise on his behalf, and handed over his official seal and ceremonial axe to Sima Yi. When Sima Yi's army reached Qiutou (丘頭), Wang Ling tied himself up but Sima Yi, acting on imperial order, sent a Registrar (主簿) to unbind Wang Ling, reassure him of his safety, and return to him his official seal and ceremonial axe.

Wang Ling met with Sima Yi at Wuqiu (武丘) with a distance of more than ten zhang between both of them. Wang Ling told Sima Yi: "If I am guilty, you can summon me to meet you. Why do you need to come here?" Sima Yi replied: "That's because you don't respond to summons." Wang Ling said: "You have failed me!" Sima Yi responded: "I would rather fail you than fail the state." Wang Ling was then escorted as a prisoner back to Luoyang. To discern Sima Yi's true intentions, Wang Ling asked him if he could receive nails for his coffin. Sima Yi had them given to him. While en route to Luoyang, when Wang Ling passed by a shrine honouring the Wei general Jia Kui, he said; "Jia Liangdao! Only the gods know Wang Ling is truly loyal to Wei." Wang Ling committed suicide on 15 June 251 by consuming poison at Xiang County (項縣; around present-day Shenqiu County, Henan). Sima Yi had Wang Ling's conspirators arrested and executed along with their families.

Cao Fang sent Wei Dan (韋誕) as an emissary to meet Sima Yi at Wuchi (五池) and congratulate him on his success in suppressing Wang Ling's rebellion. When Sima Yi reached Gancheng, Cao Fang sent Yu Ni (庾嶷) as an emissary to appoint Sima Yi as Chancellor of State, and promote him from a marquis to a duke with the title "Duke of Anping Commandery". One of Sima Yi's grandsons and one of his brothers were also enfeoffed as marquises. At the time, the Sima family had 19 marquises and 50,000 taxable households in all their combined marquisates. Sima Yi declined the appointment of Chancellor of State and refused to accept his enfeoffment as a duke.

Guo Huai's wife, the younger sister of Wang Ling, was taken into custody by imperial censors. Guo Huai apprehensively relented and let her be taken, not wanting to push things further, but when his five sons kowtowed before him until their foreheads started bleeding, he relented and ordered his subordinates to bring back his wife from the imperial censors. Guo Huai wrote a letter to Sima Yi: "My five sons are willing to sacrifice their lives for their mother. If they lose their mother, I lose them too. Without my five sons, I will no longer exist. If I have violated the law by seizing back my wife from the imperial censors, I am willing to see the Emperor and take full responsibility for my actions." After reading Guo Huai's letter, Sima Yi made an exception for Guo Huai's wife and pardoned her.

The Weilüe recounts a story of a man named Yang Kang (楊康), a former personal aide of Linghu Yu who divulged the conspiracy of Linghu Yu, who wanted to engage in a rebellion in 249 or 250. Sima Yi, while stationed in Shouchun, asked Shan Gu (單固), another former aide: "Did Linghu Yu plot a rebellion?" Shan Gu denied this but Sima Yi doubted him because Yang Kang had previously said Shan Gu had also been involved in the plot. Shan Gu and his family were arrested, and he was tortured and interrogated. Shan Gu remained firm in his denial so Sima Yi had Yang Kang called in to compare their testimonies. Yang Kang was unable to defend his own rhetoric so Shan Gu began cursing at Yang Kang. Yang Kang had thought he would be enfeoffed as a reward but because his own testimony had been inconsistent, he was sentenced to death together with Shan Gu, and both men were dragged out and executed.

Around that time, the corpses of Wang Ling and Linghu Yu had been dragged out of their tombs and their bodies had been exposed for three days in the nearest market place.

In July 251, Cao Biao was forced to commit suicide. Sima Yi then relocated the other nobles from the Cao family to Ye, where they were effectively put under house arrest.

== Death and posthumous honours ==
In July 251, when Sima Yi became critically ill, he dreamt of Jia Kui and Wang Ling haunting him, which disturbed him. (Note: Before the Tang-era Book of Jin, this ancedote was recorded in Gan Bao's Jin Ji.) Sima Yi died on 7 September 251 in Luoyang at the age of 73. Emperor Cao Fang donned mourning garments, attended Sima Yi's funeral in person, and ordered Sima Yi to be buried with the same honours as those accorded to Huo Guang in the Western Han dynasty. He also posthumously appointed Sima Yi as Chancellor of State and elevated him to the status of a duke. Sima Yi's younger brother Sima Fu, however, declined the ducal title and a wenliangche (轀輬車) (Note: A wenliangche (轀輬車) was a large horse-drawn carriage with enough space inside for a person to lie down. It was also used for carrying the coffin of a deceased person. See the dictionary definition.) on behalf of his deceased brother, stating Sima Yi would have done that if he was still alive.

Sima Yi was buried on 19 October 251 at Heyin County (河陰縣; north of present-day Mengjin County, Henan). Cao Fang granted him the posthumous title "Wenzhen" (文貞), which was later changed to "Wenxuan" (文宣). Before his death, however, Sima Yi had made arrangements to be buried at Mount Shouyang (首陽山; in Yanshi, Luoyang, Henan) with no markers such as tombstone or trees around his tomb, to be dressed in plain clothes, and have no luxury items buried with him. He also stated his family members who died after him should not be buried with him.

After Sima Yi's death, his eldest son Sima Shi assumed his father's authority up until his own death on 23 March 255, after which Sima Yi's second eldest son Sima Zhao took up his elder brother's position. On 2 May 264, when the Wei emperor Cao Huan enfeoffed Sima Zhao as the vassal "King of Jin", Sima Zhao honoured his father with the posthumous title "King Xuan of Jin".

Sima Zhao died on 6 September 265, and his eldest son Sima Yan succeeded him in his position. In February 266, after Sima Yi's grandson Sima Yan usurped the throne from Cao Huan and established the Jin dynasty with himself as the emperor, he honoured his grandfather with the posthumous title "Emperor Xuan of Jin" with the temple name "Gaozu", and named his grandfather's burial place "Gaoyuan Mausoleum" (高原陵).

== Anecdotes ==
In his youth, Sima Yi was a close friend of Hu Zhao (胡昭). In one incident, Zhou Sheng (周生) kidnapped Sima Yi and wanted to kill him. Hu Zhao braved danger to meet Zhou Sheng in the Xiao Mountains and tried to persuade him to release Sima Yi. When Zhou Sheng refused, Hu Zhao cried and pleaded with him. Zhou Sheng was so moved by Hu Zhao's sincerity he released Sima Yi. Hu Zhao told nobody about this incident and very few people knew Sima Yi owed him his life.

A different and likely fictional version of Sima Yi's joining of Cao Cao's administration comes from a Weilüe account that states Cao Hong, a veteran general serving under Cao Cao, had heard of Sima Yi's talent and wanted to recruit him as an adviser. Sima Yi thought little of Cao Hong, and refused to meet him, pretending to be so ill he could not walk without using crutches. Cao Hong was so unhappy he reported it to Cao Cao, who then summoned Sima Yi. When Sima Yi heard Cao Cao wanted to meet him, he immediately threw aside his crutches and rushed there.

Cao Cao heard Sima Yi was ambitious and had a lang gu (狼顧) (Note: The term lang gu (狼顧) refers to a wolf turning its head to look behind. It is an archaic term used to describe people who constantly feel suspicious and insecure. See the dictionary definition of 狼顧.) appearance so he wanted to see if it was true. One day, Cao Cao ordered Sima Yi to walk in front of him and made him look back. Sima Yi turned his head to look back without moving his body. Cao Cao also once dreamt of three horses feeding from the same trough (Note: In the 14th-century historical novel Romance of the Three Kingdoms, this dream foreshadows the Sima family's Jin dynasty replacing the Cao Wei state in 266. The Chinese term for "trough", cao (槽), is a homonym of the family name Cao (曹), while the three horses represented Sima Yi and his sons Sima Shi and Sima Zhao, so the dream could be interpreted as the three Simas seizing power from the Cao family. Another interpretation is the three horses represented Ma Teng, Ma Chao, and Ma Dai, since the family name Ma (馬) literally means "horse". Because the Ma family no longer posed a threat to Cao Cao, it was more likely the three horses represented the Simas.) and he felt disturbed so he warned Cao Pi: "Sima Yi won't be content with being a subject; he will interfere in your family matters". Because Cao Pi was on good terms with Sima Yi, he often protected and shielded Sima Yi from criticism. Sima Yi also took great care to create an image of himself as a diligent and faithful subject in front of Cao Cao to reduce the latter's suspicions of him.

== Appraisal and legacy ==
In 238, when Gongsun Yuan heard Sima Yi was leading a Wei army to Liaodong to attack him, he sent a messenger to request reinforcements from Wu. Sun Quan eventually complied and wrote to Gongsun Yuan: "Sima Yi is well-versed in military arts. He uses military strategy like a god. He defeats all who stand in his way. I am deeply worried for you, my brother."

In 249, Wang Guang, the son of Wang Ling, said: "Now Sima Yi cannot be fathomed, but what he does never runs contrary to the situation. He gives his assignments to the worthy and capable, and liberally credits those who are better than he; he practices the laws of the former rulers and satisfies the people's desire. Of whatever Cao Shuang did wrong, he has left nothing uncorrected. He does not relax his efforts day and night, his primary aim being to soothe the people."

It was recorded that Tan Daoji, Liu Song dynasty general, was executed because words spread within the court of Emperor Wen which said, "Isn't Tan Daoji similar to Sima Zhongda?", seeding paranoia for the emperor due to this parallel.

Emperor Ming of Jin (r. 323–325), a descendant of Sima Yi, once asked an official named Wang Dao to tell him about the origins of the Jin dynasty. Wang Dao told him everything from Sima Yi's career to Cao Mao's attempted coup against Sima Zhao. After hearing from Wang Dao, Emperor Ming said: "If what you said is true, how can the Jin (dynasty) expect to last long?"

The Tang dynasty historian Fang Xuanling, who was the lead editor of Sima Yi's biography in the Book of Jin, noted Sima Yi was known for appearing to be generous and magnanimous while actually being distrustful and jealous. According to Fang, Sima Yi was suspicious, calculative, manipulative, and a skilled practitioner of power politics. He also noted Sima Yi's cruelty in massacring Liaodong's population and exterminating Cao Shuang and his entire clan.

After the fall of the Western Jin dynasty in 316, the belief began to slowly shift from the popular ideal Wei was the rightful successor to the Han dynasty towards the view Shu may have had greater legitimacy. Before 316, Sima Yi was seen as a righteous figure and was practically deified; after 316, however, he started to be viewed in a more critical manner, which has lasted into the modern age and is exemplified by Li Shimin's comment in the Book of Jin regarding Sima Yi:

When the Son of Heaven was outside, Sima Yi raised armoured troops from the inside. The burial soil was not quite settled, and yet he hurriedly executed and massacred. How can this be a virtuous minister's conduct? An utmost good form was confused by this. In plans for campaign, how can he be wise on the one hand and foolish on the other? How can the heart of a ruler's assistant be formerly loyal and later rebellious? This is why Emperor Ming of Jin covered his face, ashamed that he through deception and falseness had accomplished achievement. Shi Le possessed unrestrained words, laughing that treachery returned to settle the enterprise. The ancients had a saying: 'One can accumulate good deeds for three years and they will remain unknown, but a single day's evil will be known by All Under Heaven.' Isn't that just so? Though you may be able to hide it for a time, posterity will still sneer at you in the end. Like stealing bells with your ears covered so no one else can hear their clamour; like planning to steal gold claiming that no one in the market will witness it. Those who see greed up close will spread their knowledge far and wide, and weakness for selfish gain will destroy a reputation. If you cannot restrain yourself for the benefit of others, your self-enrichment will bring disaster to the people.
—Li Shimin (Emperor Taizong of Tang) on Sima Yi

== Family ==
Consorts and Issue: (Note: Yu Yu's Jin Shu, cited in vol.01 of Shishuo Xinyu, recorded that Sima Jun was Yi's 17th son. If this record is correct, it would suggest that Yi had many sons whose names were not recorded. One reason could be that these sons died in infancy or childhood.)

- Empress Xuanmu, of the Zhang clan (宣穆皇后 張氏; 189–247), personal name Chunhua (春華)
  - Sima Shi, Emperor Jing (posthumous) (景皇帝 司馬師; 208–255), first son
  - Sima Zhao, Emperor Wen (posthumous) (文皇帝 司馬昭; 211–265), second son
  - Princess Nanyang (南陽公主), first daughter
    - Married Xun Yi (荀霬), and had issue (two sons)
  - Sima Gan, Prince of Pingyuan (平原王 司馬榦; 232–311), sixth son
- Lady Fu (伏夫人; fl.211 - 270s (Note: Per the Book of Jin, Lady Fu's eldest son Sima Liang was born between 211 and 227. Sima Liang's biography in the same work recorded that she was still alive at the beginning of the Xian'ning era (275-279). Jin Shu, vol.59. She had died by the time of Sima Zhou's death in June 283, as his biography recorded that he wished to be buried with his mother.))
  - Sima Liang, Prince Wencheng of Runan (汝南文成王 司馬亮; d. 291), third son
  - Sima Zhou, Prince Wu of Langya (琅邪武王 司馬伷; 227–283), fourth son
  - Sima Jing, Marquis of Qinghui (清惠侯 司馬京; c.230 – c.253), (Note: Sima Jing's biography in Book of Jin only recorded that he died at the age of 24 (by East Asian reckoning). His birth year was between 227 and 232, and his death year was between 250 and 255.) fifth son
  - Sima Jun, Prince Wu of Fufeng (扶風武王 司馬駿; 232–286), seventh son
- Lady Zhang (張夫人)
  - Sima Rong, Prince Xiao of Liang (梁孝王 司馬肜; d. 302), eighth son
- Lady Bai (柏夫人)
  - Sima Lun, Prince of Zhao (趙王 司馬倫; d. 301), ninth son
- Unknown mother
  - Princess Gaolu (高陸公主), second daughter
    - Married Du Yu, annotator of the Zuozhuan, Marquis Cheng of Dangyang (當陽成侯 杜預; 222–285)

== In fiction ==
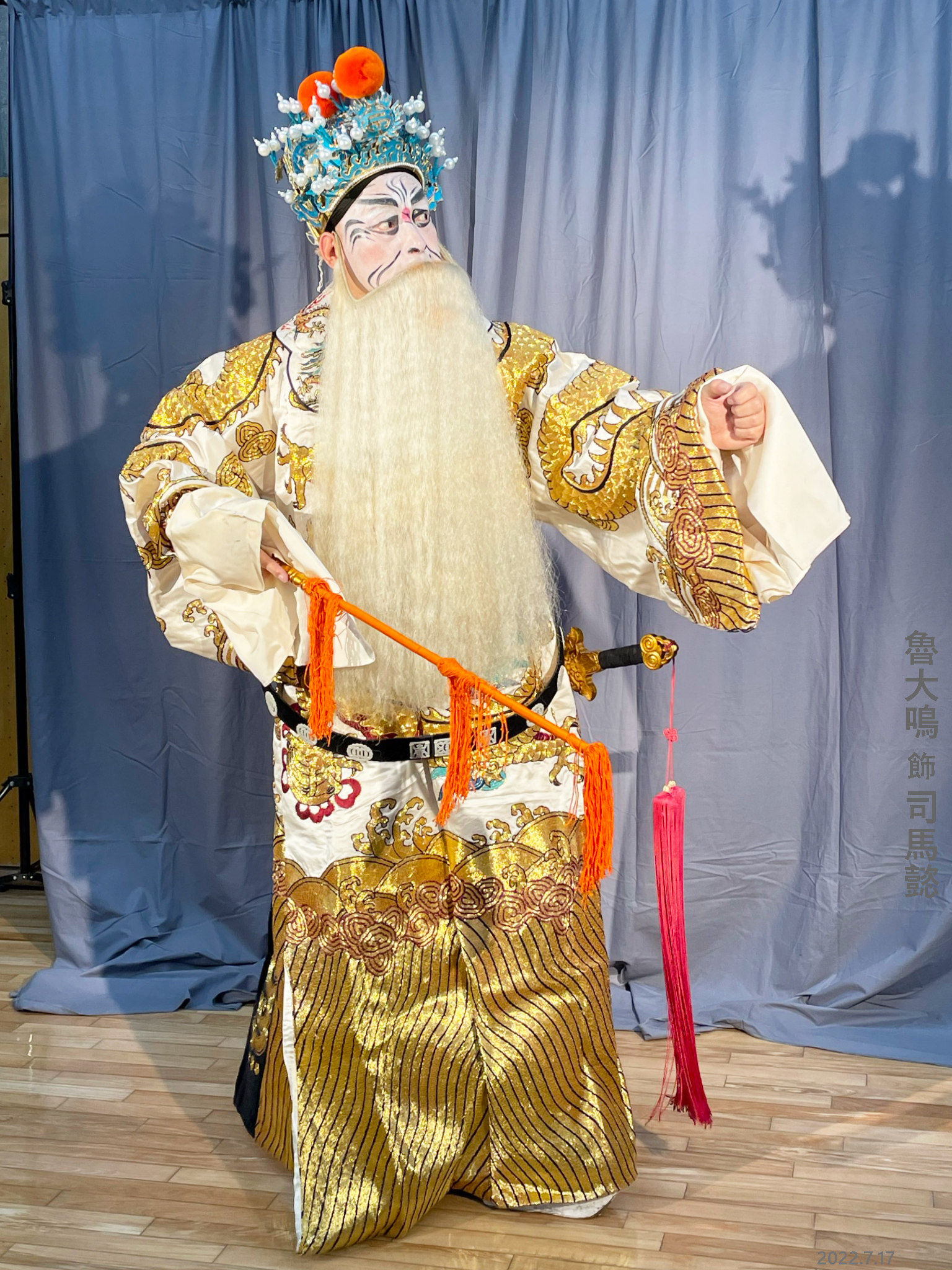
Sima Yi of Peking opera

Sima Yi is a major character in the 14th-century historical novel Romance of the Three Kingdoms, which romanticises this period. In the novel, Sima Yi pretends to be a loyal and dedicated subject of the Wei state while secretly planning to concentrate power in his hands and prepare for his descendants to usurp the throne one day – "double-dealing" in the same way Cao Cao did towards the end of the Eastern Han dynasty. Sima Yi is also a nemesis to Zhuge Liang during the Shu invasions of Wei between 228 and 234, with both of them trying to outwit each other in battles.

Sima Yi is sometimes venerated as a door god at Chinese and Taoist temples, usually in partnership with Zhuge Liang.

Chan Mou's manhua comic-book series The Ravages of Time is a fictionalised retelling of the history of the late Eastern Han dynasty and the Three Kingdoms, with Sima Yi as the central character.

Sima Yi appears as a playable character in Koei's video game series Dynasty Warriors and Warriors Orochi. In the mobile video game Puzzle & Dragons, he is featured as a God type in the Three Kingdoms 2 Pantheon alongside Ma Chao and Diaochan. In the collectible card game Magic: The Gathering there is a card named "Sima Yi, Wei Field Marshal" in the Portal Three Kingdoms set.

Notable actors who have portrayed Sima Yi include: Wei Zongwan, in Romance of the Three Kingdoms (1994); Ni Dahong, in Three Kingdoms (2010); Eric Li, in Three Kingdoms RPG (2012); Wu Xiubo, in The Advisors Alliance (2017); and Elvis Han, in Secret of the Three Kingdoms (2018).

== See also ==
- Family tree of Sima Yi
- Lists of people of the Three Kingdoms
