= Xin (surname) =

Xin (Wade–Giles: Hsin) is the romanization of several Chinese surnames including Xīn 辛, Xīn 新 and Xìn 信. Xīn 辛 is the most common among these; it is the 379th surname in the Hundred Family Surnames.

== Origin of Xin ==
=== 辛 ===
The Chinese Xin (辛) family originated from:

- Xia Hou (夏后) family in the Xia dynasty period
- Shen (莘) family in the Xia dynasty period
- Zang (藏) and Tujia (土家) the Chinese minority
- Xiang (項) family the Ji (姬) family in Later Zhou dynasty period
- Beidi the Donghu people

Also written "Sun" in Cantonese.

=== 信 ===
The Chinese Xin (信) family originated from:

- Ji (姬) family of Wei (state)
- Manchu people at Qing dynasty period

=== 新 ===
The Chinese Xin (新) family originated from:

- Ji (姬) family of Zhou dynasty
- Ji (姬) family of Jin (state) (晉)
- Mongolian of Yuan dynasty period

== Notable people named Xin ==
=== Xīn 辛 ===
- Master Wen, attributed author of Wenzi
- Xin Zhui (died 163 BC), Marquise of Dai
- Xin Ping, d. 204 – minister to Han Fu in the Eastern Han dynasty
- Xin Pi, minister for the Cao Wei empire
- Xin Xianying, 191–269 – daughter of Xin Pi
- [ Empress Xin Shi(Or)Princess Xin Shi(Zhang Zuo)], wife of the Chinese state Former Liang's ruler Zhang Zuo
- Xin Maojiang, Tang dynasty chancellor
- Empress Xin, wife of Shi Siming
- Xin Qiji, poet and statesman in the Southern Song dynasty
- Hsin Wen-bing 1912–1999, Taiwanese politician.
- Jaime Sin, 1928–2005 – archbishop of Manila
- Xin Kegui, 1950–2012 – professor at Tsinghua University
- Winnie Hsin, b. 1962 – singer in Taiwan
- William San, b. 1976 - Malaysian actor, radio deejay and host.

=== Xīn 忻 ===
- Xin Dongwang, 1963–2014 – painter in China

=== Xìn 信 ===
- Hsin Shih-chang, Deputy Minister of the Overseas Community Affairs Council of the Republic of China
- Xin Dufang, mathematician in the Northern Qi dynasty
- Xin Changxing (信长星; born 1963) is a Chinese politician, currently serving as Deputy Communist Party Secretary of Anhui province
- Xin Yumeng, director of the film Niu Lai

== See also ==
- Shin (Korean name)
- Tan (Vietnamese name)
