= Taoranting =

Taoranting may refer to the following in Beijing, China:

- Taoranting Park (陶然亭公园), city park in the former Xuanwu District, which is now part of Xicheng District
- Taoranting Station (陶然亭站), station on Line 4 of the Beijing Subway, not far from the park
- Taoranting Subdistrict (陶然亭街道), administrative division of Xicheng District that includes the above 2 entries
