= Tidawhitney Lek =

Cambodian-American visual artist and painter (b. 1992)

- Born: 1992 (age 33–34)
- Education: California State University, Long Beach (BFA, 2017)
- Known for: Paintings
- Website: tidawhitneylek.com

Tidawhitney Lek (born 1992, Long Beach, California) is a Cambodian-American visual artist working primarily with painting. Her work touches on themes related to the Southeast Asia immigrant experiences of first-generation Americans while weaving gender narratives.

== Early life and education ==
Tidawhitney Lek was born in Long Beach, Southern California, and grew up in a multigenerational Cambodian-American household. She is a US-born daughter of refugee parents who emigrated from Battambang, in northwestern Cambodia, and she is the second youngest of seven children.

She attended California State University, Long Beach, and earned her Bachelor of Fine Arts in Painting and Drawing in 2017, and also studied for six months at the Tianjin Academy of Fine Arts, in China.

== Work ==
Lek's figurative works on canvas comment on the experiences of her Cambodian American community in Southern California, and speak to the lives of first-generation persons born into migrant families in the United States. She approaches subjects such as generational trauma and domestic life, global political histories and feminist narratives. In her work, Lek often employs the use of materials such as charcoal, acrylic, pastel, oil, and other synthetic materials such as glitter. Her work follows influential surrealist female artists in 20th-century surrealist movement such as Louise Bourgeois and Leonora Carrington as well as authors from the magical realism literary movement.

Lek was a finalist for the public arts commission program of the City of Los Angeles Department of Cultural Affairs in 2020.

In 2023, Lek was a selected artist in Made in L.A. 2023: Acts of Living with two paintings, at the Hammer Museum from the University of California. In Refuge (2023), an imagined scene including the artist's multigenerational family blended in a quaint yet sinister environment.

Lek presented the solo show Living Spaces at the Long Beach Museum of Art, California, in 2023.

=== Collections ===
Lek's work is featured in the collections of Pérez Art Museum Miami, Florida; Institute of Contemporary Art, Miami, Florida; Los Angeles County Museum of Art, California; Museum of Contemporary Art, San Diego, California; Long Beach Museum of Art, California; Columbus Museum of Art, Ohio; and the Whitney Museum of American Art, New York; among others.
