= Women writers in Chinese literature =

Aspect of Chinese literature

Women have contributed to Chinese literature from the imperial era to the present, even though there were many restrictions on education, mobility, and multiple rights, they were able to write essays, fictions, and drama literatures which explored different themes such as family, education, gender roles, and social charge.

Although pre-modern China long held that women lacked literary ability, women’s writing—especially poetry—gained some recognition during the imperial period. In the early twentieth century, women writers increasingly engaged with feminist ideas and contemporary political change, expressing perspectives shaped by women’s experiences rather than those of male authors.

== Early female writers ==
Before 1840, Chinese women generally lived their lives within the family. Women followed the idea that for women, lack of literary talent was a virtue. Cai, loosely translated as "literary talent," is an attribute describing profound lyricism, deep intellectuality and analytic skill. Although it was acknowledged that both women and men possessed cai, the phrase nuren wucai bian shi de (女人無才便是德, for women, lack of literary talent is a virtue) summarizes the dominant sentiment that the literary field was traditionally a domain for men. Despite this belief, works authored by women play an integral part throughout Chinese history. There were a number of women writers before the 20th century who were respected by the intelligentsia of their era, even if much of their work was considered less important than men's work in general. Female writers helped bring forth themes such as romance, marriage, gender roles, and women's politics.

The first women recorded in the biography and bibliography were poets. The aesthetic nature of poetry was highly regarded, while fiction was viewed as an avenue taken because of a failed career or commercial venture. A marked increase in female literacy took place during the Late Imperial Era. One of the most notable poets of this time was Mao Xiuhui. She was a 16th-century poet who wrote a poem based on her husband's failure to gain a position as a civil servant. The poem draws parallels between the male and female as they suffer hardships in the political and domestic arenas. Other notable female poets in Chinese history were Gao Zhixian, Xue Tao, and Li Qingzhao. However, the recognition of poets like Li Qingzhao was often overshadowed by male writers who adopted female personas or attributed their works to women. This practice blurred the authenticity of female voices, making them harder to recognize and influencing how women’s contributions were perceived.

== 20th-century writers and feminism ==
The Chinese revolution's spectre emerged from the chaotic period of decades after the British Opium War in 1840 and the subsequent imperialist invasion. For the Chinese, the necessity of "becoming a modern person" stems from the state of emergency. Then came the 1911 Revolution. This signifies the material conditions of Chinese society and the vision of the critical imagination of these women. The beginning of the century marked a period of growing unrest for women as the feminist movement took hold. Women of this period were faced with the dilemma of protesting oppressive ideals stemming from Confucian ideology or remaining loyal to their family and maintaining peace and order. This social movement positively influenced literary discourse at the time. Women writers of the time authored works reflecting the feminist sentiment and the issues that came with the revolution. Eileen Chang, Lu Yin, Shi Pingmei and Ding Ling were four of the most influential feminist writers. In the 1920s and 1930s, Freudian psychoanalysis gained favour with Chinese feminists looking to study gender relationships, thus becoming a topic of many feminist writers throughout the early and mid portions of the 20th century.

When Mao Zedong came to power in 1949, he addressed women's rights and tried to establish women's equality through the "iron girls" of national development ideal. Through this philosophy, the Chinese government abolished long-standing practices such as Foot-binding, Prostitution and trafficking of women. Women were allowed to own land, divorce, and join the military and other employment fields. However, the establishment of this ideology did not liberate women; instead, it undermined the feminine voice by forcing women to take a male-oriented stance on public and domestic policy. Literature authored during this time reflects the restrictive and masculine perspective of women writers during this period. This "Mulanian" style of writing submerged true feminine identity, rendering the female perspective neglected and hidden in the male-dominated political and aesthetic arenas. There were some exceptions to this rule, such as Yuan Chiung-chiung, who wrote about women's issues and how much women could accomplish without men.

== Women writers in modern China (after the 1911 Revolution) ==
Broadly speaking, the public refers to all works written by women as feminine literature. After the May Fourth Movement, the Chinese modern female literature became literature with modern humanistic spirit, taking women as the subject of experience, thinking, aesthetics, and speech.

The following is a list of women writers who have made significant contributions to modern Chinese women's writing. These writers include Lu Yin, Xie Wanying, Shi Pingmei, Ding Ling, Xiao Hong, Eileen Chang, and San Mao.

Lu Yin (1898–1934), formerly known as Huang Shuyi, also known as Huang Ying, was born in Fujian Province. She was a famous writer in the May Fourth Period. She was also known as one of the three Talented Women of Fuzhou, together with Bing Xin and Lin Huiyin. She was a modern Chinese writer, employed various vernacular genres to explore women's living conditions at the turn of the 20th century. Lu Yin has the perspective of feminism and writing conceptualization. She employed redefinition and diary fiction as major rhetorical strategies to challenge the sexist assumptions in the prevailing patriarchal discourses and empower Chinese women.

Xie Wanying (1900–1999), better known by her pen name Bing Xin (Chinese: 冰心) or Xie Bingxin, was one of the most prolific Chinese writers of the 20th century. Many of her works were written for young readers. She was the chairperson of the China Federation of Literary and Art Circles. Her pen name Bing Xin carries the meaning of a morally pure heart and is taken from a line in a Tang Dynasty poem by Wang Changling.

Shi Pingmei (1902–1928), China's modern female revolutionary activist. Her real name is Ru Bi, and because of the love of the plum blossom, her pen name was Shi Pingmei. She was born in 1902 in Pingding, Shanxi Province. In 1919, she became enthusiastic about literary creation when she studied at Beijing Women's Teaching College. In September 1923, in the supplement of the morning newspaper, she serialized a long travel note. In 1924, she edited, together with her close friend Lu Jingqing, Beijing News Supplement "Women's Weekly". In 1926, she continued to co-edit the World Daily Supplement with Lu Jingqing.

Ding Ling (1904–1986) graduated from the Department of Chinese Literature at Shanghai University and became a member of the Chinese Communist Party. She was a famous writer and social activist, known for works such as Miss Sophia's Diary. In November 1936, Ding Ling arrived in northern Shaanxi and was the first scholar to go to Yan'an.

Xiao Hong (1911–1942) was a Chinese writer. She also used the pen name, Qiao Yin. Xiao Hong is a female writer with a unique artistic style. She is unique in literature history with her mixed emotional tone, hard and soft language style. Xiao Hong is a typical female youth in literature with her exceptional writing perspective and writing structure in her works.

Eileen Chang (1920–1995), formerly known as Zhang Ying, pen name Liang Jing, was born in Shanghai. One of her famous works is The Red Rose and the White Rose. Eileen Chang is a widely regarded as a significant figure writer in the history of modern Chinese literature. Her life-long creation involves novels, essays, and script reviews, among which novels have achieved prominence. Her novels show personal characteristics in material selection, conception, characterization, narrative structure and language skills. She has expanded a new horizon of female criticism and a new world of female literature.

San Mao (1943–1991), a well-known Taiwan female writer and traveller, used to be named Chen Maoping and later changed to Chen Ping, a native of Zhejiang. Born in Chongqing in 1943. In 1948, she moved to Taiwan with her parents. In 1967, she went to Spain to study and later went to Germany and the United States. In 1973, she settled in the Spanish Sahara and married Jose. After returning to Taiwan in 1981, she taught at the Cultural University and resigned in 1984 to focus on writing and speech. Sanmao's works have real emotions, without too much decoration, but show the original appearance of life and the wisdom and interest in life. In her works, there is no romance described in general love works, but more practical.

== See also ==
1. Anarchism in China
2. New Youth
3. Feminism in China
4. New Culture Movement
