= Gao Junyu =

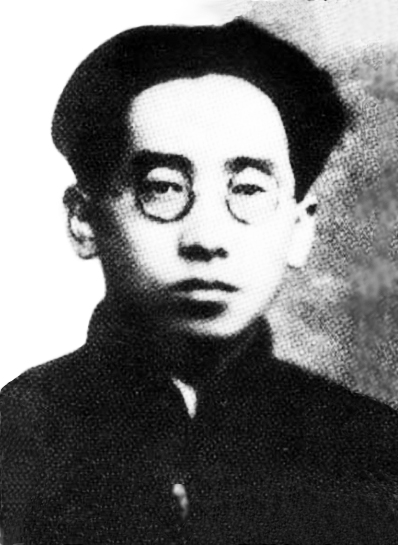
Gao Junyu

Gao Junyu (Chinese: 高君宇; October 22, 1896 – March 5, 1925) was a member of the 2nd Central Executive Committee of the Chinese Communist Party. Born in Jingle County, Shanxi Province, he entered Peking University in 1916 and participated in the May 4 Movement of 1919. He attended the 2nd congress of the Chinese Communist Party from 1922 to 1923. In 1924, he accompanied Sun Yat-sen to Guangzhou, where he worked as Sun's secretary. Shortly after returning to Beijing with Sun, he died suddenly of illness. He was laid to rest in Beijing's Taoranting Park.

In the years before he died he had met the talented Marxist writer Shi Pingmei. Gao Junyu's own marriage had been arranged when he was young but it was still extant. They would meet and eventually Gao Junyu divorced his wife, but his love was unrequited. The only token of love Shi accepted was an ivory ring which matched one that he wore. He died when she was 23 and for the next three years she went to Taoran Pavilion where he was buried. After Shi's early death her friend Lu Yin wrote a novel based on their love story named "Ivory Rings". This story has been retold in a book and a film. Gao Junyu and Shi's graves are a place of pilgrimage for young couples.
