= Taoranting Subdistrict =

Taoranting Subdistrict 陶然亭街道
- Subdistrict
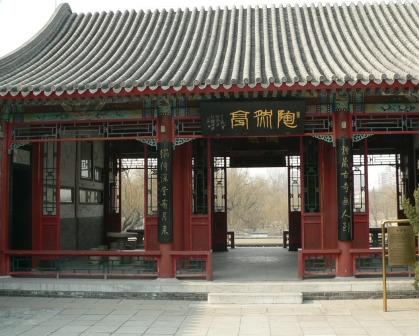
- Taoranting Park within the subdistrict, 2011

- Location within Beijing Location within China
- Coordinates: 39°52′48″N 116°22′57″E
- Country: China
- Municipality: Beijing
- District: Xicheng

Area
  - Total: 2.14 km^{2} (0.83 sq mi)

Population (2020)
  - Total: 42,231
  - Density: 19,700/km^{2} (51,100/sq mi)
- Time zone: UTC+8 (China Standard)
- Postal code: 100052
- Area code: 010

Taoranting Subdistrict (Chinese: 陶然亭街道; pinyin: Táorántíng Jiēdào) is a subdistrict on the southeast part of Xicheng District, Beijing, China. As of 2020, its total population is 42,231.

This subdistrict got its name from the Taoranting Park (Chinese: 陶然亭公园; lit. 'Leisure Pavilion Park') that is located in the subdistrict.

== History ==
Timetable of changes in the status of Taoranting Subdistrict
Time	Status	
Jin dynasty	Part of Tiezhong and Nanchuntai Wards	
Yuan dynasty	Part of South Suburb, Dadu	
Ming dynasty	Divided, western portion is part of Xuannan Ward	Divided, eastern portion is part of Zhengnan Ward, Outer City
Qing dynasty	Part of Outer City	
1912	Part of 4th Outer District	Part of 5th Outer District
1949	Part of 11th District	Part of 12th District
1950	Part of 9th District	
1952	Part of Xuanwu District	
1954	Created as Taoranting Subdistrict	
1958	Bao'ansi, Zixinlu and part of Hufanglu Subdistricts were incorporated into Taoranting Subdistrict	
1960	Changed to a commune	
1978	Reinstated as a subdistrict	
2010	Transferred under Xicheng District	

== Administrative Division ==
As of 2021, there are a total of 10 communities under the subdistrict. They are listed on the table below:

Administrative Division Code	Community Name in English	Community Name in Simplified Chinese
110102016001	Mishi	米市
110102016003	Fenfang Liulijie	粉房琉璃街
110102016004	Fuzhouguan	福州馆
110102016006	Heiyaochang	黑窑厂
110102016007	Longquan	龙泉
110102016008	Hongtudian	红土店
110102016012	Nanhuali	南华里
110102016013	Xinxingli	新兴里
110102016014	Yiping	壹瓶
110102016015	Dajixiang	大吉巷

== Landmark ==
- Taoranting Park
- Huguang Guild Hall
