= Xin Xianying =

Chinese noblewoman and advisor (191–269)

Xin Xianying 辛憲英
- Born: 191 (Note: Xin Xianying's biography in the Jin Shu recorded that she died in the 5th year of the Taishi era (265–274) of the reign of Emperor Wu of Jin at the age of 79 (by East Asian age reckoning). By calculation, her year of birth was 191.)
- Died: 269 (aged 78)
- Spouse: Yang Dan
- Children: Yang Jin; Yang Xiu; Xiahou Zhuang's wife
- Father: Xin Pi
- Relatives: Xin Chang (brother); Yang Hu (nephew); Empress Jingxian (niece); Empress Xianwen (great-granddaughter)

Xin Xianying (Note: According to her biography in vol. 96 of Book of Jin, "Xianying" was her courtesy name. Her given name was not recorded in official histories.) (191–269) was a Chinese noblewoman, aristocrat and advisor who lived during the Three Kingdoms period. She was a daughter of Xin Pi, an official of the state of Cao Wei. The only extant historical source about her life is her biography written by her maternal grandson, Xiahou Zhan (夏侯湛), who was a notable scholar and official of the Jin dynasty. She is best known for giving advice to her family members and relatives during significant events in the history of Cao Wei such as the Incident at the Gaoping Tombs and Zhong Hui's Rebellion.

== Family background ==
Xin Xianying's ancestral home was in Yangzhai County (陽翟縣), Yingchuan Commandery (潁川郡), which is around present-day Yuzhou, Henan. Her ancestors were actually from Longxi Commandery (隴西郡; around present-day Dingxi, Gansu), but they migrated to Yingchuan Commandery during the Jianwu era (25–56 CE) of the reign of Emperor Guangwu in the early Eastern Han dynasty.

Xin Xianying's father, Xin Pi, served as an official under the warlord Cao Cao, who controlled the central government and the figurehead Emperor Xian in the final decades of the Eastern Han dynasty. After the fall of the Eastern Han, Xin Pi continued serving in the Cao Wei state during the Three Kingdoms period and his highest appointment was Minister of the Guards (衛尉). Xin Xianying had a younger brother, Xin Chang (辛敞), who also served as an official in Wei.

Xin Xianying married Yang Dan (羊耽), the youngest son of the Eastern Han dynasty official Yang Xu (羊續). Yang Dan, who was from Taishan Commandery (泰山郡; around present-day Tai'an, Shandong), served as the Minister of Ceremonies (太常) in the Wei central government. Yang Dan's nephews and nieces include Yang Hu and Yang Huiyu (children of his brother Yang Dao); a great-granddaughter was Yang Xianrong (daughter of his grandson Yang Xuanzhi).

== Reaction towards Cao Pi's joy at becoming crown prince ==
In 217, after Cao Cao's son Cao Pi won the succession struggle against his younger brother Cao Zhi and became the heir apparent to their father's vassal kingdom, he was so elated that he hugged Xin Pi and said: "Sir, don't you know how happy I am?"

When Xin Pi told his daughter about it, she sighed and said: "A crown prince will succeed a ruler and inherit his kingdom one day. How can he succeed his father without feeling sad? How can he rule a kingdom without feeling intimidated? If he expresses joy instead of sadness and fear, how can his kingdom last long? How can Wei prosper?"

Xin Xianying was essentially implying that Cao Pi should express sadness because his father must die before he can become the next ruler, and that he should feel intimidated by the fact that he would have to shoulder the heavy responsibility of ruling a kingdom. If Cao Pi accepted his role more solemnly, then it was more likely that he would turn out to be a serious and wise ruler.

== Advising Xin Chang during the Incident at Gaoping Tombs ==
Xin Xianying's younger brother Xin Chang served as an adviser to the Wei general Cao Shuang, who served as regent to the third Wei emperor Cao Fang. On 5 February 249, when Cao Shuang accompanied Cao Fang on a visit to the Gaoping Tombs (Cao Rui's mausoleum), his co-regent Sima Yi took advantage of his absence to stage a coup d'état and seize control of all the armed forces in the imperial capital Luoyang. Lu Zhi (魯芝; 190-273), a major under Cao Shuang, prepared to lead his men to fight their way out of Luoyang and regroup with Cao Shuang. When Lu Zhi asked Xin Chang to follow him, a fearful Xin Chang turned to his sister for advice: "The Emperor is away. The Grand Tutor (Sima Yi) has ordered the city gates to be shut. People say that this won't be of any good to the State. What do you think will happen?"

Xin Xianying replied: "We won't know what will happen. However, from what I observe, the Grand Tutor has no choice but to do this. Before Emperor Ming died, he held the Grand Tutor close and entrusted him with state affairs. Many officials in the imperial court still remember this. Although Cao Shuang too was entrusted with this responsibility along with the Grand Tutor, he has been monopolising power and acting autocratically. He is disloyal towards the Emperor and therefore doesn't have the moral high ground. The Grand Tutor simply wants to get rid of him."

When Xin Chang asked her if he should follow Lu Zhi, she replied: "How can you not go? It is righteous for one to perform his duty. When others are in trouble, we ought to help them. If you work for someone and you don't do what you need to do, then that isn't a good sign. If you are a close aide (of Cao Shuang), then you should fulfil your loyalty towards him and sacrifice your life for him if you have to. However, in this incident, you just need to follow the crowd (Note: Xianying is reminding her brother that he was not affiliated with Cao Shuang.)." Xin Chang heeded her advice and followed Lu Zhi out of Luoyang to join Cao Shuang.

Cao Shuang eventually surrendered to Sima Yi and relinquished his powers as regent. He was subsequently charged with treason and executed along with his extended family, his close aides and their families. After Cao Shuang had suffered death, Jiang Ji said to Sima Yi, “Xin Chang and Lu Zhi and others who had been of his party had forced the gate and joined the rebels. Yang Zong had opposed the surrender of the seal of the late minister. They deserve punishment.” However, no action was taken against them. “They are righteous people who serves their master faithfully,” said Sima Yi, and he even confirmed these men in their offices. Xin Chang sighed, “Had I not listened to the advice of my sister, I would have walked in the way of unrighteousness.”

A poet has praised Xin Xianying saying:

“You call him lord and take his pay,

Then stand by him when danger nears

Thus to her brother spoke Xin Xianying

And won fair fame though endless years.”

Due to Xin Xianying's virtuous attitudes, Sima Yi was impressed by her loyalty, so the Xin clan was spared from extermination and later became one of the most loyal maintainers of the Jin dynasty (266-420).

== Foreseeing Zhong Hui's downfall ==
When the Wei general Zhong Hui was appointed as General Who Guards the West (鎮西將軍) in 263, Xin Xianying asked her nephew Yang Hu: "Why is Zhong Shiji going to the west?" Yang Hu replied: "He is leading a campaign to conquer Shu." Xin Xianying then cautioned Yang Hu: "Zhong Hui is wilful and unbridled in his ways. This is a sign that he won't remain subordinate to others for long. I believe that he may rebel in the future."

When Zhong Hui was about to leave for the campaign against Shu, he wrote to the Wei imperial court to seek permission to bring along Yang Xiu (羊琇), Xin Xianying's son, as a military adviser. Xin Xianying lamented: "In the past, I was worried for the State. Today, trouble has come to my family." Yang Xiu appealed to the Wei regent Sima Zhao to not accompany Zhong Hui on the campaign, but Sima Zhao denied his request. Before Yang Xiu left, Xin Xianying advised him: "Always be mindful of your actions. The junzis of ancient times were filial towards their parents at home, and loyal to their states outside home. When you do your job, always think about what your duty is. When you face a question of morality, always think about where you stand. Don't make your parents worry about you. When you are in the army, being benevolent towards others will go a long way to help you."

In March 264, after successfully conquering Shu for Wei, Zhong Hui started a rebellion against Wei. However, the rebellion failed when some of Zhong Hui's men mutinied against him and killed him. Yang Xiu remained unharmed throughout the rebellion.

== Death and appraisal ==
Xin Xianying died in 269 during the reign of Emperor Wu in the Western Jin dynasty. She was 79 (by East Asian age reckoning) at the time of her death.

Since her childhood, Xin Xianying had been studying and reading, which girls in her time did not normally do. She was also known for her intelligence, talent and wisdom.

Xin Xianying was also known for leading a simple and frugal life. When her nephew Yang Hu once sent her a silk blanket as a gift, she found the gift too expensive so she returned it to him.

== Relatives and descendants ==
Xin Xianying and Yang Dan had at least two sons and a daughter. Their first son, Yang Jin (羊瑾), served as the Right Supervisor of the Masters of Writing (尚書右僕射) in the Cao Wei government. Yang Jin's son, Yang Xuanzhi (羊玄之), served as Right Supervisor of the Masters of Writing (尚書右僕射) and a Palace Attendant (侍中) in the government of the Jin dynasty. Yang Xuanzhi was the father of Yang Xianrong, whose first husband was Emperor Hui of the Jin dynasty.

Xin Xianying and Yang Dan's second son, Yang Xiu (羊琇), continued serving in the government of the Jin dynasty after the end of the Cao Wei state, and became a Regular Mounted Attendant (散騎常侍) under Emperor Wu, the first Jin emperor. (Note: Yang Xiu was best-known for his attempt to assassinate Yang Yao (younger brother of Yang Jun), in the aftermath of Emperor Wu forcing Sima You to leave the capital Luoyang. After the attempt failed, Yang Xiu was so aggrieved that he died shortly after. Yang Xiu's biography in Book of Jin only mentioned that he advised Emperor Wu not to send Sima You away.)

Xin Xianying and Yang Dan's daughter married Xiahou Zhuang (夏侯莊), a son of Xiahou Wei and grandson of Xiahou Yuan. Xiahou Zhuang and Xin Xianying's daughter had a son, Xiahou Zhan (夏侯湛), who became a notable scholar and official in the Jin dynasty. Xiahou Zhuang also had another son, Xiahou Chun (夏侯淳), who served as a commandery administrator in the Jin dynasty. Xiahou Zhuang's daughter, Xiahou Guangji (夏侯光姬), was the mother of Emperor Yuan of the Jin dynasty.

Other notable relatives of Xin Xianying include Yang Hu and Yang Huiyu, her nephew and niece respectively through her marriage to Yang Dan.

== In popular culture ==
Xin Xianying is first introduced as a playable character aligned with the Jin dynasty faction in the ninth installment of Koei Tecmo's video game series Dynasty Warriors. Her personality is portrayed as a cheerful and intelligent young woman who has excellent insight. Her character voice role is filled by Shino Shimoji.

== See also ==
- Lists of people of the Three Kingdoms
