= Lü Bicheng =

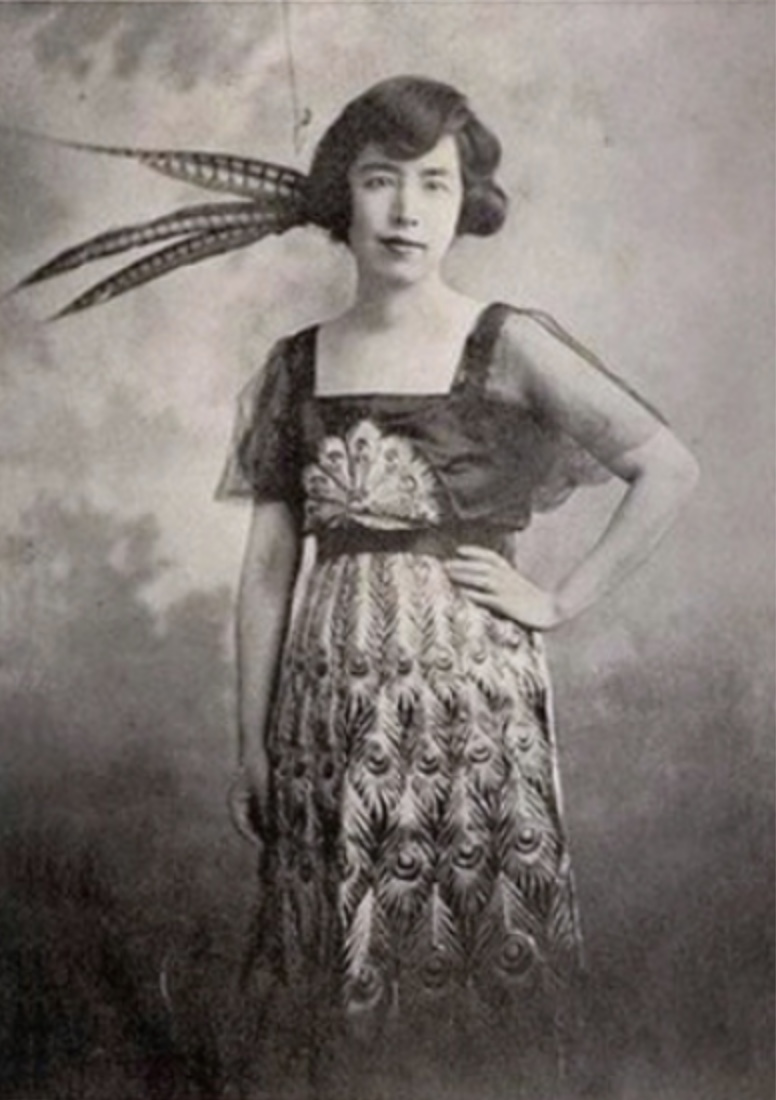
- P. C. Lee in London, 1920s.
- Born: 1883; Taiyuan, Shanxi, Qing Empire
- Died: 1943 (aged 59–60); Hong Kong
- Occupations: Poet, newspaper editor, educator

Lü Bicheng (traditional Chinese: 呂碧城; simplified Chinese: 吕碧城; pinyin: Lǚ Bìchéng; Wade–Giles: Lü Pi-ch'êng, also known as P. C. Lee [Pi-Cheng Lee or Pi-Cheng Li], Alice (P.) Lee or Alice Pichen Lee: 1883–1943) was a Chinese writer, activist, newspaper editor, poet and school founder. She has been mentioned as one of the top four women in literature from the early Republic of China.

== Early life ==
Lü Bicheng was born in Taiyuan, Shanxi in 1883 during the late Qing dynasty, but is considered a native of her ancestral home of Jingde County, Anhui by Chinese convention. Her father Lü Fengqi, who earned a jinshi degree in 1877, served as Educational Commissioner of Shanxi Province. Her mother Yan Shiyu (嚴士瑜) was an educated gentry woman. Lü Bicheng was the third of four daughters in the family, and her elder sisters Lü Huiru and Lü Meisun were also known for their literary achievement.

When she was four, her father retired to Lu'an, Anhui. She lived a life of comfort until the age of 12, when her father died in 1895. Because Lü Fengqi had no male heir, relatives of the Lü lineage contested for his inheritance, and Yan Shiyu and her four daughters were forced to move to Lai'an County to live with her natal family. When she was nine, Lü Bicheng was betrothed to a Wang family, but as her own family fortune declined, the Wang family broke off the marriage contract, giving the young Bicheng the stigma of a "rejected woman". The resulting emotional scar is often considered a major factor in her later decision to never marry. Her widowed mother and the Lü girls were not well treated at the Yan family in rural Anhui. When Lü was 15 or 16, Yan Shiyu sent her to live with her maternal uncle Yan Langxuan (嚴朗軒), who was the salt administrator in Tanggu, the port city outside the northern metropolis of Tianjin. Her sister Huiru also joined her later.

Lü Bicheng studied at Columbia University in New York in 1920, and she returned to Shanghai in 1922. She went to America again in 1926, ending her Shanghai period she travel to Europe, but finally Lü Bicheng settled in Switzerland between 1927 and 1933.

== Career ==
During her stay in Tanggu, Qing China went through the tumultuous period of the failed Hundred Days' Reform of 1898, which brought about increasing awareness of women's education, and the Boxer Rebellion of 1900. In 1904, Mrs. Fang, the wife of her uncle's secretary, invited Lü Bicheng to visit a girls' school in Tianjin, but her uncle prevented her from going and severely reprimanded her. The next day, she ran away from her uncle's home, and took the train to Tianjin with no money or luggage. She wrote a letter to Mrs. Fang, who was staying at the dormitory of the Ta Kung Pao newspaper. Ying Lianzhi, the Catholic Manchu nobleman who founded the newspaper, read the letter and was so impressed by it that he made her an assistant editor. Lü Bicheng wrote a "progressive" ci that she had previously written, set to "A River Full of Red" ("Manjianghong") usually used to express heroic emotions. Ying transcribed the whole song in her diary and published it in L'impartial two days later. At the time, it was sensational for a woman to write for an influential national newspaper such as Ta Kung Pao. She was 21 years old. She used Ta Kung Pao to promote feminism and became a well-known figure.

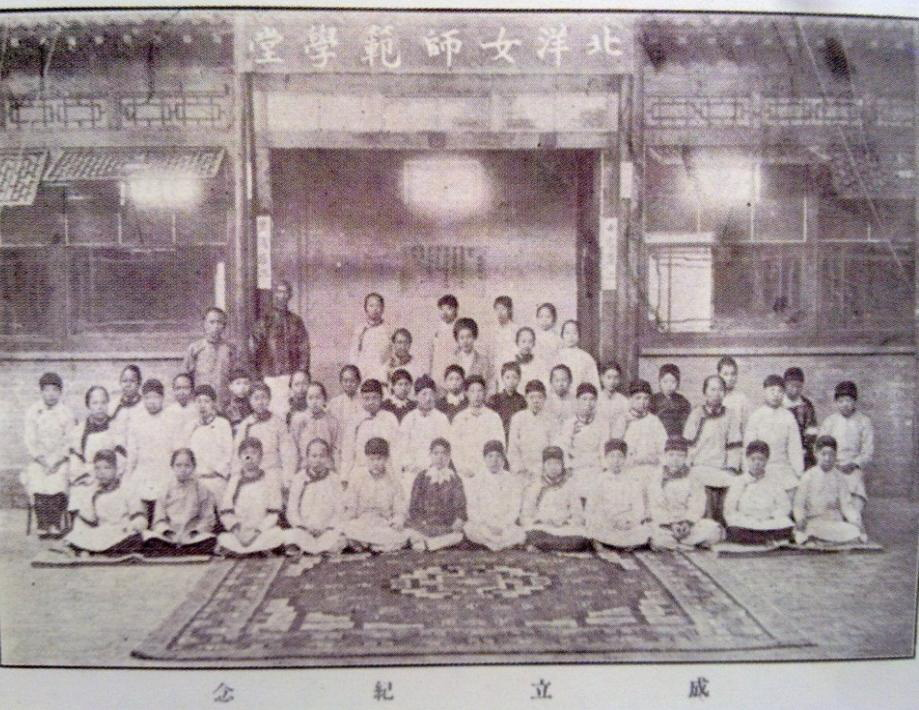
Beiyang Women's Normal School in 1912 – the school that Lü started.

Lü's ci poetry was published in the newspaper and it was very well received. She was the chief editor of the newspaper from 1904 to 1908. In 1904 she decided to improve education for girls. She had published her thoughts on women's rights and the general editor of the newspaper introduced her to Yan Fu who was an advocate for Western ideas. The Beiyang Women's Normal School was established that same year. At 23 Lü took on the job of principal of the school she had founded two years before. At first this school found it difficult to find girls who qualified for secondary education and students were brought in from Shanghai to make up the numbers. Alumni of this school included Deng Yingchao, Liu Qingyang and Xu Guangping. Lü knew the revolutionary Qiu Jin and they had similar objectives but Lü did not join her in Japan when she was invited as she was unsure whether women should meddle in politics. She was then chosen to be secretary to Yuan Shikai, one of the most powerful people in China. When he set out to declare himself emperor of China she left, like many of his followers, and abandoned him.

In the 1910s, the photos of Lü Bicheng also appeared in magazines Women's Eastern Times (Funü shibao, 1911–17), this magazine is China's first business-oriented women's magazine. In 1918, Lü Bicheng published her first poetry collection, Tidings of Flowers (Xinfang ji). In 1918 Lü travelled to New York where she attended Columbia University for four years. During this time she was a foreign correspondent for the Shanghai Times. Between 1918 and 1920, Lü Bicheng visited Mount Lu, she wrote a literary essay "Sojourn in Mount Lu: A Sundry Record". Lü Bicheng not only wanted to combine traditional Chinese learning with western natural science, but also wanted to let the world see the elegant style of Chinese women, so that women have a free life.

In early 1920 Lü Bicheng wrote several books on Buddhism as well as articles on the state of Buddhism in Europe, she working with local organizations to promote vegetarianism. She may have been introduced to Buddhism as early as 1917, but until 1930 she really became a committed practitioner and using the Buddhist name Baolian (Precious Lotus). In 1930 Lü became a Buddhist and ceased to publish any more of her works. There is a book about vegetarianism and animal rights that has an unusual theme and presentation called Light of Europe and America (Oumei zhi guang). It was published in Shanghai in 1931 and distributed both by the Shanghai Buddhist Press and by Kaiming Book. She later died in 1943 in Hong Kong.

== Legacy ==
Lü Bicheng has been listed as one of the top four women "geniuses" of the early Republic of China, together with Eileen Chang, Xiao Hong, and Shi Pingmei; Lü's biography was published in 2012.

== See also ==
- Su Qing – a Republican-era writer
- Lizzie Yu Der Ling – a late-Qing and Republican-era writer
- Nellie Yu Roung Ling – a late-Qing and Republican-era author, dancer and socialite

== Bibliography ==
- Cong, Xiaoping (2011). Teachers' Schools and the Making of the Modern Chinese Nation-State, 1897–1937. UBC Press. ISBN 978-0-7748-4133-7.
- Fong, Grace S. (2004a). "Alternative Modernities, or a Classical Woman of Modern China: The Challenging Trajectory of Lü Bicheng's (1883–1943) Life and Song Lyrics". In Fong, Grace; Qian, Nanxiu; Zurndorfer, Harriet (eds.). Beyond Tradition and Modernity: Gender, Genre, and Cosmopolitanism in Late Qing China. Brill. pp. 12–59. doi:10.1163/9789047412960_004. ISBN 978-90-474-1296-0. S2CID 244752556.
- Fong, Grace (2004b). "Alternative Modernities, or a Classical Woman of Modern China: The Challenging Trajectory of Lü Bicheng's (1883-1943) Life And Song Lyrics". NAN NÜ. 6 (1): 12–59. doi:10.1163/1568526042523227.
- Gao, James Z. (2009). Historical Dictionary of Modern China (1800–1949). Scarecrow Press. ISBN 978-0-8108-6308-8.
- Lee, Lily Xiao Hong; Stefanowska, A. D. (2003). Biographical Dictionary of Chinese Women. M.E. Sharpe. ISBN 978-0-7656-0798-0.
- Different Worlds of Discourse : Transformations of Gender and Genre in Late Qing and Early Republican China, edited by Nanxiu Qian, et al., Brill, 2008.
- Hammerstrom, Erik J.. The Science of Chinese Buddhism : Early Twentieth-Century Engagements, Columbia University Press, 2015. (page. 61-62)
- Hebei Women's Normal Education Pioneers: One Century's Fragrant Trace of Wisdom, Feb. 5th 2019, edited by Jianbing Dai, and Yongyan Wang. ISBN 9781527527836. (Page 64)
- The Business of Culture : Cultural Entrepreneurs in China and Southeast Asia, 1900-65, edited by Christopher Rea, and Nicolai Volland, UBC Press, 2014.
- The Cultural Practices of Modern Chinese Buddhism: Attuning the Dharma Routledge critical studies in Buddhism, 2007, edited by Francesca Tarocco. ISBN 0415375037, 9780415375030
