= Xin Pi =

Chinese Cao Wei state official (died c. 235)

- 辛毗

Minister of the Guards (衛尉)
- In office 234 – c. 235
- In office 227 – 234
- Monarch: Cao Rui

Military Adviser to the General-in-Chief (大將軍軍師)
- In office 234
- Monarch: Cao Rui
- In office ?–?
- Monarch: Cao Pi

Palace Attendant
- In office 220 – ?
- Monarch: Cao Pi

Chief Clerk to the Imperial Chancellor (丞相長史)
- In office c. 219 – 220
- Monarch: Emperor Xian of Han
- Chancellor: Cao Cao

Consultant (議郎)
- In office c. 204 – c. 219
- Monarch: Emperor Xian of Han
- Chancellor: Cao Cao (after 208)

Personal details
- Born: before 175 Yuzhou, Henan
- Died: c. 235 (Note: Xin Pi's date of death is not recorded in the Sanguozhi. The Australian sinologist Rafe de Crespigny writes that Xin Ping "died about 235". De Crespigny probably based his assertion on the Zizhi Tongjian, which recorded that in 235, Xin Pi advised Cao Rui not to build a tower; Cao Rui took his advice.)
- Relations: Xin Ping (brother)
- Children: Xin Xianying; Xin Chang
- Occupation: Official
- Courtesy name: Zuozhi (佐治)
- Posthumous name: Marquis Su (肅侯)
- Peerage: Marquis of Ying District (潁鄉侯)

Xin Pi (178 or before (Note: Xin Pi's eldest child, Xin Xianying, was born in 191.) - c. 235), courtesy name Zuozhi, was an official of the state of Cao Wei during the Three Kingdoms period of China. Along with his elder brother Xin Ping, he started his career in the late Eastern Han dynasty as an adviser to the warlord Yuan Shao. Following Yuan Shao's death and a power struggle between Yuan Shao's sons Yuan Tan and Yuan Shang, Xin Pi initially sided with Yuan Tan but later defected to Yuan Shao's rival Cao Cao, while seeking Cao Cao's aid on Yuan Tan's behalf in the fight against Yuan Shang. As a result, his family members were executed by Shen Pei, a Yuan Shang loyalist who blamed Xin Pi for the downfall of the Yuan family. After avenging his family, Xin Pi served as an official under Cao Cao, who controlled the Han central government and the figurehead Emperor Xian. After the Cao Wei state replaced the Eastern Han dynasty, Xin Pi continued serving under Cao Cao's successor Cao Pi, the first Wei emperor, and later under Cao Rui, Cao Pi's son. Throughout his service in Wei, he was known for being outspoken and critical whenever he disagreed with the emperors and his colleagues. His highest appointment in the Wei government was the Minister of the Guards (衞尉). He died around 235 and was survived by his son Xin Chang and daughter Xin Xianying.

== Family background ==
Xin Pi was from Yangzhai County (陽翟縣), Yingchuan Commandery (潁川郡), which is around present-day Yuzhou, Henan. His ancestors were actually from Longxi Commandery (隴西郡; around present-day Dingxi, Gansu), but they migrated to Yingchuan Commandery during the Jianwu era (25–56 CE) of the reign of Emperor Guangwu in the early Eastern Han dynasty.

== Service under Yuan Shao and Yuan Tan ==
Xin Pi and his elder brother Xin Ping served as advisers to the warlord Yuan Shao, who controlled much of northern China from 191 to 202. When the warlord Cao Cao, who was also Yuan Shao's rival, held the position of Minister of Works (司空) in the Han central government between 196 and 208, he invited Xin Pi to serve in his administration but Xin Pi refused.

Following Yuan Shao's death in 202, internal conflict broke out between his sons Yuan Shang and Yuan Tan over the succession to their father's place. Yuan Shao's followers also split into two camps – one supporting Yuan Shang and the other backing Yuan Tan. In 203, when Yuan Shang attacked Yuan Tan at Pingyuan County, Guo Tu advised Yuan Tan to make peace with Cao Cao and ally with Cao Cao to counter Yuan Shang. After Yuan Tan reluctantly agreed, Guo Tu nominated Xin Pi to serve as Yuan Tan's representative to meet Cao Cao.

=== Persuading Cao Cao to ally with Yuan Tan against Yuan Shang ===
Around the time, Cao Cao was planning for an invasion of Jing Province (covering present-day Hubei and Hunan) and had stationed his troops at Xiping County (西平縣; southeast of present-day Wuyang County, Henan). When Xin Pi met Cao Cao, he conveyed Yuan Tan's message and sought Cao Cao's support in dealing with Yuan Shang. Although Cao Cao was initially pleased to hear that Yuan Tan wanted to ally with him against Yuan Shang, a few days later he changed his mind and wanted to attack Jing Province first. He also hoped that in doing so, the Yuan brothers would continue to fight each other.

Some days later, when Xin Pi attended a feast hosted by Cao Cao, he noticed that Cao Cao had changed his mind after observing his facial expressions, so he spoke to Cao Cao's adviser Guo Jia. After Guo Jia told him, Cao Cao asked Xin Pi: "Can Yuan Tan be trusted? Can Yuan Shang be defeated?" Xin Pi replied:

"Wise Lord, you shouldn't be asking about trust and deceit; you should be talking about the current situation as it is. When the Yuan brothers fight each other, the more important question is not whether you can take advantage of the situation to drive a deeper wedge between them, but rather you should be talking about seizing the opportunity to unify and pacify northern China. Since Yuan Tan is seeking your help, it is obvious that he is in deep trouble now. Although Yuan Shang knows that Yuan Tan is weak, he hasn't pressed on his attack. This shows that Yuan Shang isn't powerful enough to completely destroy Yuan Tan. The Yuan regime is divided into two. Externally, they lose battles against their enemies; internally, they purge political opponents. The Yuan brothers wage war against each other. After years of war, their soldiers' armour have become rusty. Droughts and locust swarms have destroyed their crops and caused a famine. Their treasury is empty. Their troops have no food supplies. It is indeed both a natural and man-made disaster for them. Any person, be he wise or foolish, will know that the Yuan regime will collapse soon just from simply observing their current situation. It is a sign from Heaven that Yuan Shang will meet his doom. According to the military classics, one can't defend a base without adequate food supplies even if the base is well-fortified and its defenders are well-trained and well-equipped. If you attack Ye, Yuan Shang will have to turn back to save the city or else he will lose his base. If he turns back to save Ye, Yuan Tan will make aggressive advances behind him. Given your might, it will be very easy for you to defeat an exhausted enemy, just as a gust of autumn wind can easily scatter leaves to the ground. Heaven has granted you, Wise Lord, an opportunity to eliminate Yuan Shang, yet you choose to attack Jing Province instead. Jing Province is prosperous and peaceful; it isn't experiencing any form of internal conflict. Zhong Hui once said: 'Attack an enemy who is experiencing internal chaos or on the verge of collapse.' As of now, the Yuan brothers couldn't care less about the future when they fight each other. This is an instance of "internal chaos". His followers, be they behind city walls or out on the battlefield, are having a shortage of food supplies. This is an instance of "on the verge of collapse". The Yuan brothers' doom is near; their people are in a state of panic and fear. Shouldn't you pacify their people now instead of waiting to do so in the future? If they have a good harvest next year, recognise the peril they are in, and take appropriate actions to correct their mistakes and cover their weaknesses, then you would have lost an opportunity to subdue them by military force. As of now, you stand to gain the greatest benefit if you agree to help Yuan Tan and pacify them. Besides, there are no greater opposing forces to you than those from Hebei. Once you pacify Hebei, your armies will become so powerful that the Empire will tremble at your might."

Cao Cao was very much pleased with Xin Pi's words, and he agreed to aid Yuan Tan. Xin Pi officially joined Cao Cao's army not too long after. Cao Cao then marched his forces to Liyang (黎陽, near present-day Xun County, Henan).

== Service under Cao Cao ==
=== Battle of Ye ===
In 204, Xin Pi accompanied Cao Cao on a campaign against Yuan Shang. Earlier on, when conflict first broke out between Yuan Shang and Yuan Tan, Xin Pi decided to side with Yuan Tan and follow him to Pingyuan County but he left his family members behind in Ye (in present-day Handan, Hebei). Yuan Shang later had Xin Pi's family members arrested and imprisoned. During the Battle of Ye, when Yuan Shang's adviser Shen Pei saw that Cao Cao's forces had broken through Ye's defences, he blamed Xin Pi for the downfall of the Yuan family so he ordered his men to execute all of Xin Pi's family members except for his children, Xin Chang and Xin Xianying. After Ye fell to Cao Cao's forces, Xin Pi rushed to the prison to free his family but it was too late as all of them were already dead, save for his children.

After the battle, Xin Pi found Shen Pei, who was being escorted as a captive to be brought before Cao Cao. He started hitting Shen Pei on the head with his horse whip while scolding him: "Slave, today you shall meet your doom!" Shen Pei looked at Xin Pi and replied: "You dog! It is because of you that Cao Cao conquered Ji Province. I can't wait to kill you, but too bad it turns out that today I am at your mercy." After Cao Cao met Shen Pei, he considered releasing Shen Pei but Xin Pi started crying and insisting that he wanted Shen Pei dead as justice for his family, so Cao Cao had no choice but to order Shen Pei's execution.

After the Battle of Ye, Cao Cao recommended the Han central government to appoint Xin Pi as a Consultant (議郎).

=== Hanzhong Campaign ===
In 217, when Cao Cao ordered his general Cao Hong to lead troops to attack Liu Bei's forces at Xiabian County (下辨縣; northwest of present-day Cheng County, Gansu), he also appointed Xin Pi and Cao Xiu to serve as Cao Hong's deputies. Cao Cao also issued a memo to them as follows: "In the past, when Emperor Gaozu indulged in luxury and women, Zhang Liang and Chen Ping were there to point out his mistakes. Today, Zuozhi and Wenlie will ensure that (Cao Hong) will not be careless."

After Xin Pi returned from the campaign, he was appointed as the Chief Clerk (長史) to the Imperial Chancellor (丞相), the position held by Cao Cao in the Han central government.

== Service under Cao Pi ==
After Cao Cao died in early 220, his son Cao Pi usurped the throne from Emperor Xian later that year, ended the Eastern Han dynasty, and established the Cao Wei state with himself as the new emperor. After Cao Pi took the throne, he appointed Xin Pi as a Palace Attendant and awarded him the peerage of a Secondary Marquis (關內侯).

=== Advising Cao Pi against changing the starting date of the calendar year ===
At the time, there was a discussion in Cao Pi's imperial court on the issue of whether to change the starting date of the calendar year. Xin Pi argued that it was unnecessary to do so since there was a peaceful transition from the Eastern Han dynasty to the Cao Wei state, just like how Yu succeeded Shun in ancient times. He pointed out that the ruling dynasty only changed the starting date when it replaced its predecessor through violence, such as the Shang dynasty replacing the Xia dynasty and the Zhou dynasty replacing the Shang dynasty in turn. He also quoted sayings from Confucius and the Zuo zhuan which mentioned that the starting date of the calendar year set in the Xia dynasty was the most legitimate one, and therefore it would be best for the Cao Wei state to follow it. Cao Pi heeded Xin Pi's suggestion.

=== Advising Cao Pi against relocating residents from Hebei to Henan ===
On one occasion, Cao Pi considered relocating 100,000 households from Ji Province (present-day Hebei) to the lands south of the Yellow River in present-day Henan. At the time, the people were suffering from famine as locust swarms had destroyed their crops. Although his officials strongly objected to the relocation, Cao Pi was bent on proceeding with his plan.

When Xin Pi and other officials requested an audience with him, Cao Pi knew that they were going to dissuade him from relocating the households, so he put on a stern face when he met them. While the others became afraid upon seeing the emperor's facial expression and did not dare to speak up, Xin Pi asked: "How did Your Majesty come up with the idea of relocating those households?" Cao Pi asked him in return: "Do you think it is inappropriate?" Xin Pi replied: "Indeed. I do believe it is inappropriate." Cao Pi then said: "I am not going to discuss it with you."

Xin Pi said: "Your Majesty doesn't think I am incapable. That is why you appoint me as a close aide and adviser. Why then wouldn't you discuss it with me? I am not speaking up because it is a private matter to me, but because it is an issue of concern to the state. Why do you need to get angry at me?"

When Cao Pi ignored him and walked back to his personal chambers, Xin Pi followed him and held on to his sleeve. Cao Pi became so annoyed that he forcefully pulled Xin Pi's hand off his sleeve and retreated into his chambers. When he came out later after a long time, he asked Xin Pi: "Zuozhi, what made you so impatient just now?" Xin Pi replied: "If Your Majesty relocates those households, you will lose the people's hearts. Besides, they are already suffering from famine." Cao Pi eventually did relocate those households but only 50,000 instead of 100,000.

=== Speaking up against Cao Pi's hunting of pheasants ===
On another occasion, when Xin Pi accompanied Cao Pi on a pheasant hunting trip, the emperor remarked: "What a joy it is to hunt pheasants!" Xin Pi responded: "Your Majesty may see it as a joy, but your subjects see it as a pain." Cao Pi became unhappy and hardly went out hunting again from then on.

=== Advising Cao Pi against attacking Eastern Wu ===
In 223, during the Battle of Jiangling between Wei and its rival state Eastern Wu, Xin Pi served as a military adviser to the Wei general Cao Zhen. After he returned from the battle, Cao Pi elevated him from the status of a secondary marquis to a village marquis under the title "Marquis of Guangping Village" (廣平亭侯).

When Cao Pi later planned to launch a large-scale invasion of Wu, Xin Pi attempted to dissuade him by saying:

"It is difficult to rule over the people of Wu and Chu. They will submit to us if we manage to win them through virtue; if we fail morally, they will turn against us. This is not a new phenomenon. Since ancient times, the people of Wu and Chu have been regarded as a threat. As long as Your Majesty rules the Empire, how can those who oppose you last long? In the past, although Zhao Tuo became king of the Nanyue kingdom and Gongsun Shu declared himself the Son of Heaven, their regimes did not last long. They either surrendered or were destroyed. Why? They lacked virtue. That was why they won't be safe and stable for long. If one is virtuous, he will gain acceptance and recognition. As of now, the Empire has just stabilised and the lands are barren and the population is small. Under normal circumstances, if a state is to go to war, its government will have to plan way ahead in advance. Even when such plans have been made, before going to war, the state should also be on the lookout for gaps and flaws in its plans. Since we have yet to make even the most basic preparations, I don't think we are capable of securing victory. The Previous Emperor led several campaigns to attack Wu, but there was never a time when he managed to advance beyond the Yangtze River. As of today, we don't have as large an army as he did, so all the more it will be even more difficult for us to win. The best course of action is to follow Fan Li's strategy by letting our troops rest and recuperate, and allowing the people to live in peace and go about with their normal livelihoods. We should also follow Guan Zhong's approach and focus on domestic affairs, adopt Zhao Chongguo's tuntian method, and emulate Confucius's style of diplomacy. If we do this for about ten years, those who are healthy and strong now will maintain their fitness, while boys would have grown up and become men. By then, we will have a larger army and a greater population who are more aware of what they need to do for the greater good of our state. They will be more willing and more determined to fight for our state. If we go to war then, we will definitely secure victory."

Cao Pi asked: "If we follow what you said, does that mean that we will have to leave it to our descendants to eliminate our enemies?" Xin Pi replied: "In the past, King Wen of Zhou knew that the time wasn't ripe yet, so he left it to his son King Wu of Zhou to eliminate Di Xin. If the time isn't ripe yet, I don't see why we shouldn't wait!"

Cao Pi did not heed Xin Pi's advice and went ahead with leading his troops to attack Wu, a decision that many historians believe doomed his domain to ruling only the northern and central portions of China. However, he ultimately aborted the campaign and retreated after reaching the northern banks of the Yangtze River.

== Service under Cao Rui ==
Following Cao Pi's death in 226, his son Cao Rui succeeded him as the emperor of Wei. After his coronation, Cao Rui promoted Xin Pi from a village marquis to a district marquis under the title "Marquis of Ying District" (潁鄉侯) and awarded him a marquisate comprising 300 taxable households.

=== Tense relations with Liu Fang and Sun Zi ===
At the time, there were two Wei officials – Liu Fang (劉放) and Sun Zi (孫資) – who wielded much influence in the central government as they were highly trusted by Cao Rui. Many other officials tried to curry favour with them so that it would be beneficial to their careers. Only Xin Pi refused to have any dealings with the two of them.

Xin Pi's son, Xin Chang (辛敞), urged his father: "Liu Fang and Sun Zi are highly influential in the government. Everyone can't wait to get into their good books. I think you could lower yourself a little and try to get along well with them, or else they might slander you."

Xin Pi sternly replied:

"The Emperor may not be intelligent, but at least he isn't muddle-headed and stubborn. I live by my own code and I set my own standards. Even if I don't get along with Liu Fang and Sun Zi, at the most I won't become one of the Three Ducal Ministers. What greater harm can befall me? No person of good character will give up his principles just because he wants to be a Ducal Minister.

Some time later, an official Bi Gui submitted a memorial to Cao Rui as follows: "Wang Si (王思), the Supervisor of the Masters of Writing, is a diligent and accomplished senior official. However, he is not as good as Xin Pi in virtue and strategy. I recommend Xin Pi to replace Wang Si." After reading Bi Gui's memorial, Cao Rui sought Liu Fang and Sun Zi's opinions. They said: "Your Majesty chose Wang Si because you saw that he is a practical and hardworking person who doesn't care how others see him. Xin Pi may have a good and virtuous reputation, but he is too straightforward and domineering. Your Majesty should carefully consider this issue again." Cao Rui eventually did not replace Wang Si with Xin Pi, and instead promoted Xin Pi to serve as Minister of the Guards (衛尉).

=== Advising Cao Rui against his construction projects ===
During his reign, Cao Rui started labour-intensive extravagant palace construction/renovation projects which took a heavy toll on the common people, who were recruited as labourers for the projects. Xin Pi wrote a memorial to urge Cao Rui to stop the projects:

"I heard that Zhuge Liang is actively preparing for war, and that Sun Quan has been purchasing horses from Liaodong. It seems to me that they are planning to launch a coordinated attack on us. It is a time-honoured practice for states to always be on guard and prepare for unforeseen scenarios. We are, instead, working on such cost- and labour-intensive construction projects. Besides, the harvests in the past few years have not been good. The Classic of Poetry says: 'The people indeed are heavily burdened, but perhaps a little ease may be got for them. Let us cherish this centre of the kingdom, to secure the repose of the four quarters of it.' (Note: This line is quoted from the "Decade of Sheng Min" (生民之什) section of the "Greater odes of the kingdom" (大雅) in the Classic of Poetry. An English translation by James Legge is available here: https://ctext.org/book-of-poetry/decade-of-sheng-min) I hope that Your Majesty will consider the bigger picture."

Cao Rui replied: "By working on these projects while Eastern Wu and Shu Han have yet to be vanquished, I am providing opportunities for outspoken and fame-seeking people to voice their opinions. It should be the collective responsibility of the people to construct and maintain the imperial capital of the Empire. By building a grander imperial capital now, I am actually helping to reduce the burden on future generations. This was the most basic approach that Xiao He adopted when he oversaw the construction of the imperial capital of the Han dynasty. You, as an important figure in the imperial court, should know this very well."

Cao Rui also wanted to flatten the top of Mount Mangdang (芒碭山; located north of present-day Yongcheng, Henan) and build a terrace on it so that he could view Meng Ford (孟津; present-day Mengjin County, Henan) from there.

When Xin Pi heard about it, he wrote to the emperor: "Heaven and Earth are meant to be as they are. If the land is high, then it should be high; if the land is low, then it should remain low. Attempting to modify the geography will not only be going against nature, but also a waste of manpower and resources, as well as a heavy burden on the people. Besides, if we turn the hills and mountains into flat lands, we will have no natural barriers to protect us when the river floods." Cao Rui heeded Xin Pi's advice and dropped his idea.

=== Response to Zhang He's death ===
In 231, after the Wei general Zhang He was killed in an ambush while pursuing Shu forces after the Battle of Mount Qi, Cao Rui lamented his death and told all his officials: "We lost Zhang He before we even conquer Shu. What will become of my generals?" Chen Qun remarked: "Zhang He was indeed a great general. He was a pillar of our state."

Although Xin Pi agreed that Zhang He's death was a huge loss for Wei, he believed that, on the inside, the Wei forces should not feel demoralised and, on the outside, show their enemy that they had become weaker without Zhang He. He rebuked Chen Qun: "Lord Chen, how can you say this? Towards the end of the Jian'an era, when everyone said the Empire couldn't do without Emperor Wu, the ruling dynasty still changed and Emperor Wen received the Mandate of Heaven. During the Huangchu era, everyone also said that we couldn't do without Emperor Wen, but he still passed away and His Majesty came to the throne. Surely, the Empire has more talents than just one Zhang He."

Chen Qun replied: "What Xin Pi said is also true." An amused Cao Rui quipped: "Lord Chen, you are really good at changing your stance."

The fifth-century historian Pei Songzhi argued that Xin Pi made an inappropriate comparison between Zhang He and the Wei emperors because generals and emperors were of different social status and hence should not be seen in the same light. In Pei Songzhi's opinion, Xin Pi should have instead compared Zhang He with other Wei generals such as Zhang Liao. He also pointed out the comparison did not reflect well on Xin Pi, who was known for being outspoken and upright, because he came close to degrading the status of the Wei emperors by making such a comparison.

=== Battle of Wuzhang Plains ===
In 234, the Battle of Wuzhang Plains took place between Wei and Shu forces, who were respectively led by Sima Yi and Zhuge Liang. When the situation came to a stalemate, Sima Yi, who held the position of General-in-Chief (大將軍), wrote to Cao Rui to seek permission to engage the enemy. Cao Rui denied him permission. Later, as the stalemate dragged on, Cao Rui became worried that Sima Yi would defy orders and attack the enemy, so he appointed Xin Pi as military adviser to the General-in-Chief, granted him an imperial sceptre (a symbol of the emperor's authority), and sent him to the frontline to ensure that Sima Yi followed orders and stayed in camp. Xin Pi carried out his task well, and no one dared to disobey him.

The Weilue recorded that Sima Yi wanted to order his troops to attack after the Shu forces goaded and provoked him numerous times. However, Xin Pi used the imperial sceptre to order them to remain in camp and refrain from engaging the enemy. Although Sima Yi was unhappy about it, he had no choice but to defer to Xin Pi.

After Zhuge Liang died of illness during the standoff, Xin Pi was recalled back to serve as Minister of the Guards (衞尉) again in the central government.

== Death ==
Xin Pi died on an unknown date but the Australian sinologist Rafe de Crespigny estimated that he died around 235. The Wei government honoured him with the posthumous title "Marquis Su" (肅侯), which means "serious marquis".

== Descendants ==
Xin Pi's son, Xin Chang (辛敞), had the courtesy name Taiyong (泰雍). He inherited his father's peerage as the Marquis of Ying District (潁鄉侯) and served as an official in the Wei government. He rose to the position of Administrator of Henei Commandery (河內郡; around present-day Jiaozuo, Henan) during the Xianxi era (264–265). The Shiyu (世語) recorded that he later became the Minister of the Guards (衞尉) like his father.

Xin Pi also had a daughter, Xin Xianying, who married Yang Dan (羊耽). (Note: Xin Xianying was introduced as a playable character in the ninth instalment of Koei's Dynasty Warriors series.) The Jin/Han-Zhao empress Yang Xianrong was a great-granddaughter.

== See also ==
- Lists of people of the Three Kingdoms
