= Jiushan, Henan =

Jiushan 鸠山镇
- Town
- Location within Henan
- Coordinates: 34°13′11″N 113°10′13″E
- Country: China
- Province: Henan
- Prefecture-level city: Xuchang
- County-level city: Yuzhou

Area
  - Total: 93 km^{2} (36 sq mi)

Population (2019)
  - Total: 36,000
  - Density: 390/km^{2} (1,000/sq mi)

Jiushan (simplified Chinese: 鸠山镇; traditional Chinese: 鳩山鎮; pinyin: Jiūshān Zhèn) is a town in the western portion of Yuzhou, Xuchang, Henan, China. The town spans an area of 93 square kilometres (36 mi^{2}), and has a population of about 36,000.

== History ==
During the Song dynasty, Jiushan was home to a number of porcelain kilns. Ruins of some of the kilns remain today, and are a tourist attraction.

The town was home to Jiushan Red University (Chinese: 鸠山红专大学), a Communist Party-run school where Party members went to receive ideological training and learn survival skills. The now-delipidated ruins of the school remain, and are a red tourist attraction.

== Geography ==
Jiushan is located in western Yuzhou, bordered by Fangshan (Chinese: 方山镇) and Wenshu (Chinese: 文殊镇) to its east, Mojie Township (Chinese: 磨街乡) to its south, the county-level city of Ruzhou to its west, and the county-level city of Dengfeng to its north.

== Administrative divisions ==
Jiushan administers 31 administrative villages (Chinese: 行政村; pinyin: xíngzhèng cūn).

- Tangzhuang Village (Chinese: 唐庄村)
- Chigou Village (Chinese: 池沟村)
- Licun Village (Chinese: 李村村)
- Wangcun Village (Chinese: 王村村)
- Liujiagou Village (Chinese: 刘家沟村)
- Minzhuang Village (Chinese: 闵庄村)
- Hougou Village (Chinese: 后沟村)
- Zhaozhuang Village (Chinese: 赵庄村)
- Zhaogou Village (Chinese: 赵沟村)
- Fanmen Village (Chinese: 范门村)
- Lianzhuang Village (Chinese: 连庄村)
- Louyuan Village (Chinese: 楼院村)
- Chuhuangzhuang Village (Chinese: 楚黄庄村)
- Nanzhai Village (Chinese: 南寨村)
- Xixue Village (Chinese: 西学村)
- Datangou Village (Chinese: 大潭沟村)
- Guanzhuangyao Village (Chinese: 官庄窑村)
- Tongzhuang Village (Chinese: 仝庄村)
- Jiushan Village (Chinese: 鸠山村)
- Xiaquan Village (Chinese: 下泉村)
- Xuegou Village (Chinese: 薛沟村)
- Tiandong Village (Chinese: 天垌村)
- Zhangjiazhuang Village (Chinese: 张家庄村)
- Cuijiazhuang Village (Chinese: 崔家庄村)
- Jiaojiazhuang Village (Chinese: 焦家庄村)
- Weijing Village (Chinese: 魏井村)
- Laowanggou Village (Chinese: 老王沟村)
- Guansi Village (Chinese: 官寺村)
- Shangguansi Village (Chinese: 上官寺村)
- Chenyao Village (Chinese: 陈窑村)
- Houdi Village (Chinese: 后地村)

== Economy ==
Jiushan has 28,000 mu of arable land.

== Transportation ==
Henan Provincial Highway S325 runs through the town.
