= Xin Ping =

Chinese official who served warlord Yuan Shao

Xin Ping 辛評
- Born: Unknown; Yuzhou, Henan
- Died: Unknown
- Other name: Zhongzhi (仲治)
- Occupation: Official
- Relatives: Xin Pi (brother)

Xin Ping (fl. 190s–204), courtesy name Zhongzhi, was a Chinese official who served under the warlords Han Fu, Yuan Shao and Yuan Tan during the late Eastern Han dynasty.

== Life ==
Xin Ping was from Yangzhai County (陽翟縣), Yingchuan Commandery (潁川郡), which is around present-day Yuzhou, Henan. His ancestors were actually from Longxi Commandery (隴西郡; around present-day Dingxi, Gansu), but they migrated to Yingchuan Commandery during the Jianwu era (25–56 CE) of the reign of Emperor Guangwu in the early Eastern Han dynasty.

Xin Ping started his career as an adviser to the warlord Han Fu, who governed Ji Province (covering much of present-day Hebei) from 189 to 191. In 191, Xin Ping, along with Xun Chen and Guo Tu, managed to persuade Han Fu to give up his governorship of Ji Province to another warlord Yuan Shao, who they said would be in a better position to defend Ji Province from an invasion by a rival warlord Gongsun Zan. Xin Ping subsequently became an official serving under Yuan Shao, and he brought along his younger brother Xin Pi.

In the year 200, Yuan Shao clashed with his rival Cao Cao at the Battle of Guandu. During the battle, two sons of Yuan Shao's adviser Shen Pei were captured by Cao Cao's forces. Meng Dai (孟岱), one of Yuan Shao's subordinates, was not on good terms with Shen Pei, so he asked his colleague Jiang Qi (蔣奇) to pass a message to Yuan Shao: "Shen Pei has been behaving autocratically and he has strong support from his kinsmen. Now that his two sons have been captured by the enemy, he may think of defecting to the enemy to save his sons." Xin Ping and his colleague Guo Tu agreed with Meng Dai. Yuan Shao thus appointed Meng Dai as his new army supervisor and ordered him to replace Shen Pei as the officer guarding his home base in Ye (present-day Handan, Hebei).

In 202, two years after his disastrous defeat at the Battle of Guandu, Yuan Shao died without clearly naming one of his sons as his successor. A power struggle thus broke out between two of his sons, Yuan Tan and Yuan Shang, over the succession. Yuan Shao's followers were also divided into two camps: one camp, led by Shen Pei and Pang Ji, supported Yuan Shang and helped him gain control over Ye city; the other camp, led by Xin Ping and Guo Tu, sided with Yuan Tan, who based himself in Pingyuan County. The Yuan brothers then waged war against each other.

In 203, when Yuan Shang attacked Yuan Tan at Pingyuan County, Guo Tu advised Yuan Tan to make peace with Cao Cao and ally with Cao Cao to counter Yuan Shang. After Yuan Tan reluctantly agreed, Guo Tu nominated Xin Ping's brother Xin Pi to serve as Yuan Tan's representative to meet Cao Cao. Xin Pi succeeded in his mission and managed to convince Cao Cao to help Yuan Tan. Cao Cao then led his forces to Liyang (黎陽; present-day Xun County, Henan).

Earlier on, when conflict first broke out between Yuan Shang and Yuan Tan, Xin Ping's brother Xin Pi accompanied Yuan Tan to Pingyuan County but left his family members behind in Yuan Shang's base at Ye city. Yuan Shang later ordered the Xin family to be arrested and imprisoned. In 204, Cao Cao led his forces to attack Yuan Shang at the Battle of Ye. When Cao Cao's forces broke through Ye's defences, Shen Pei, who was in charge of defending Ye, blamed Xin Pi for the Yuan family's downfall so he ordered his men to execute the Xin family in prison. After Ye fell to Cao Cao's forces, Xin Pi, who was with Cao Cao at the time, rushed to the prison to free his family but it was too late as all of them were already dead.

While it is unknown whether Xin Ping was executed along with his family, there is no further mention of him in historical records.

== See also ==
- Lists of people of the Three Kingdoms
