= Xin Dongwang =

Chinese painter (1963–2014)

- 忻东旺
- Born: 29 April 1963
- Died: 11 January 2014 (aged 50); Beijing
- Known for: Oil painting

Xin Dongwang (Chinese: 忻东旺; 29 April 1963 – 11 January 2014) was a Chinese painter, regarded as one of the representative painters of contemporary Chinese neo-realist oil paintings by art critics and art historians. His works focus on the bottom and marginalized people in life, reflecting the times and people's livelihood issues in Chinese society since the reform and opening up.

== Early life and career ==
Xin Dongwang was born in 1963 in Xinjiafang village, Kangbao, Zhangjiakou, Hebei, China. Xin taught at several institutions throughout his career: in the Fine Arts Department of Shanxi Normal University and the Oil Painting Department of Tianjin Academy of Fine Arts, and later, as an Associate Professor in the Painting Department at the Academy of Arts & Design, Tsinghua University. He died due to lymphoma on January 11, 2014.

== Art ==
Xin Dongwang specialized in realist figure paintings. His subjects were mainly migrant workers and farmers, portrayed in a style that integrated Chinese art elements and expressive techniques. His works are noted for their directness and vigor, reflecting social criticism and humanistic care. Shaped by his personal experiences and artistic sensibility, they often featured exaggerated, stocky figures with large hands and feet, inspired by traditional Chinese arts and sculptures.

In 2011, Xin Dongwang's painting Golden Wedding was sold for HK$5.06m at Christie's Hong Kong. He was nominated by Artprice among the Top 500 contemporary artists world wide (rank 171/500, July 2016 – June 2017).

== Exhibitions ==
- 2003 – Beijing, China – Beijing International Art Biennale, Edge
- 2005 – Beijing, China – National Art Museum of China, Xin Dongwang Oil Painting Exhibition (solo)
- 2006 – Shanghai, China – Shanghai Art Museum, Biographies of Villagers – Exhibition of Xin Dongwang’s Oil Paintings (solo)
- 2009 – Valais, Switzerland – Le Manoir de la Ville de Martigny, Work (group)
- 2010 – New York, USA – Rockefeller Center, Realism (Trans-realism), Chinese Contemporary Art Exhibition (group)
- 2011 – Beijing, China – National Art Museum of China, Annual Exhibition of Chinese Realistic Painting School (group)
- 2013 – Beijing, China – National Art Museum of China, Paint again and abstract together – Chinese famous oil painters Sketches research exhibition (group)
- 2013 – Beijing, China – China Oil Painting Academy Art Museum, Love is born from the heart – Xin Dongwang Art Works Exhibition (solo)
- 2014 – Beijing, China – National Art Museum of China, 10th Anniversary Exhibition of Chinese Realistic Painting School (group)
- 2016 – Beijing, China – Rongbaozhai Contemporary Art Museum, The memory of love – A review of Xin Dongwang’s art (solo)
- 2018 – Beijing, China – Tsinghua University Art Museum, Psyche: A Portfolio of Xin Dongwang's works (solo)

== Publications ==
At 2009, Xin published a book of five years' complete works of China realism.
