= Shi Pingmei =

Chinese writer

Pingmei Shi
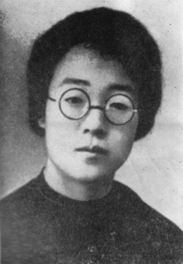
- Born: 20 September 1902; Taiyuan
- Died: 30 September 1928 (aged 26); Beijing
- Occupation: writer

Pingmei Shi or Shi Pingmei (石评梅; 20 September 1902 – 30 September 1928) was a Chinese writer. She was considered as one of the four women famous for their contributions to modern Chinese literature in the early Republic of China.

== Life ==
Shi was born in Taiyuan in 1902 in Pingding County, Shanxi Province. From an early age she was exceptional. She would memorise whole books. Her father did not agree that to keep women virtuous you should keep them ignorant and he sent his daughter to school in Taiyuan. She studied in Shanxi's provincial capital until she was 18 when she graduated from the Taiyuan Women's Teaching College. Her education's costs were small as charges were not made for exceptional students. The school had been started by Lü Bicheng.

She took an interest in politics and for that reason she moved to Beijing and enrolled at the Women's Teaching College. She actually majored in physical education because there was no course that year for literature.

After she left education she had a busy life. She wrote novel poetry and became a popular writer on ideas and Marxism. Her love life was tragic. She was tricked into swearing her undying love to a married man. When she met another man, Gao Junyu, she felt too damaged to accept his proposals and she demanded only friendship. He was from the same province of China and he was a founding member of China's communist party. Gao Junyu was also a devoted communist and he was married. They would meet and Gao Junyu divorced his wife. The only token of love she accepted was an ivory ring which matched one that he wore. He died when she was 23 and for the next three years she went to Taoran Pavilion where he was buried. She also had a now famous friendship with fellow writers Lu Yin and Lu Jingqing. Both of these friends had been very close to her during her life with an intimacy that is similar to heterosexual love. All three of them appear in Lu Yin's book and they act as narrators of Shi Pingmei's fictionalised story.

Shi died when she was 26 and was buried next to Gao Junyu in Taoranting Park. The story was highlighted by Zhou Enlai when he was premier of a communist China. He visited their graves and highlighted that love and revolution were not incompatible.

Shi died in 1928 and she came to be regarded in the Republic of China as one of the top four most talented Chinese women with Lü Bicheng, Eileen Chang and Xiao Hong. After her death her friend Lu Yin wrote a novel based on her love story named "Ivory Rings". This story has been retold in a book and a film. Gao Junyu and Shi's graves were a place of pilgrimage for young couples and groups after her story was published.
