= Ren Han =

- Born: February 27, 1984 (age 42); Tianjin, PR China
- Education: Tianjin Academy of Fine Arts, Villa Arson
- Notable work: drawing, installation
- Movement: Contemporary art

Ren Han
- Traditional Chinese: 任瀚
- Simplified Chinese: 任瀚
Transcriptions
Standard Mandarin
- Hanyu Pinyin: Rén Hàn
- Wade–Giles: Jen² Han⁴

Ren Han (Chinese: 任瀚; pinyin: Rén Hàn; born February 27, 1984, in Tianjin) is a Chinese contemporary artist.

== Biography ==
Ren Han was born in 1984 in Tianjin, China. He graduated from the Oil Painting Department of the Tianjin Academy of Fine Arts in 2006, then he graduated from the Villa Arson (Ecole Nationale Supérieure d’Art in Nice) in 2011 and obtained the DNSEP (National Superior Diploma of Expression of Plastic Arts). In the same year, he was selected for the Jeune Creation in France. In 2017 Ren Han won the Rock Award from Wang Shikuo Art Foundation and Today Art Museum. In 2019 he was selected for the Salon de Montrouge and received the fellowship from the French Ministry of Culture, Department of Hauts-de-Seine and city of Montrouge.
Ren Han's work can be regarded as a series of systematic researches on artistic creation, image, and visual experience, which are deeply rooted in the context of visual cultural consumption in the post-network era. His works include drawings, installations, and site-specific works. He reproduces and processes ready-made objects/images. The strange and primitive relationship between human beings and nature is the theme often discussed by Ren Han. He questions the meaning of human beings’ continuous construction and destruction driven by desire. The duality presented in his works not only denote the eternal co-existence of binary oppositions of self and other, but also the philosophical relationships of mind and matter, mind and body, as well as man and nature.
In addition to his work as an artist, He is also the co-founder of the Space Regeneration Projects.

== Exhibitions ==
=== Selected solo exhibitions ===
2020

- "Bibliothèque de Ren Han", Yishu 8 Chez Tante Martine, Paris, France

2019

- "Solo Show", Raibaudi Wang Gallery, Paris

2017

- "Void and Ashes", Qi Mu Space, Beijing

2016

- "Mirror Image", C-Space, Beijing

2015

- "Emergence", LAB 47, Beijing

2014

- "Emulating Nature", C-Space, Beijing

2012

- "Studiolo #2", Less Is More Projects, Paris

=== Selected group exhibitions ===
2021

- Wake-Up Call, Poush Manifesto, Paris

2020

- A Kind of Form, Song Art District, Beijing

2019

- A Ten Year, OWSPACE X Taikang Space, Aranya
- 64e Salon de Montrouge, Le Beffroi, Montrouge

2017

- A New Collection of Poetry, AMNUA, Nanjing
- Amassing Force – 2017 Wang Shikuo Award: Exhibition of Nominated Contemporary Artists, Today Art Museum, Beijing
- Multiple Halo, XI Contemporary Center, Dongguan

2016

- Puzzles, OCAT Xi'an, Xi'an
- Up-Youth: Young Artists Experiment Field, Beijing Times Art Museum, Beijing
- Ghost in Flash: After Photography, Taikang Space, Beijing

2015

- JIMEI x ARLES International Photo Festival| Engine: The Imagetriggered Mechanism of Artistic Production, Jiageng Art Center, Xiamen
- 24 Art Project – Naissance, Today Art Museum, Beijing

2014

- Everyday Anxiety – the 5th Jinan International Photography Biennial, Art Museum of Shandong University of Art & Design, Jinan
- Look Into the Far Horizon – New Voices of Chinese Contemporary Art, Musée des Arts Asiatiques, Nice
- Paper Being, Tianjin Art Museum, Tianjin

2013

- Unboundedness, China Cultural Center in Berlin, Berlin
- ABC, Austrian Embassy in China, Beijing
- Consciousness – Exhibition of Tianjin Contemporary Artists, Tianjin Art Museum, Tianjin
- Contemporary Spirituality, Eglise Saint-Louis de l'hôpital de la Pitié Salpêtrière, Paris

2012

- New Directions: Young Chinese Contemporary Artists, Moscow Museum of Modern Art, Moscow

2011

- Jeune Création 2011, Centquatre, Paris
- Demain C’est Loin, Galerie de la Marine and Villa Arson, Nice

== Bibliography ==
- (in French) Jeune Creation 2011, Association Jeune Creation, 2011
- (in French and English) Elfi Turpin, Supplément Semaine Volume VI – Demain c'est loin, Analogues, 2011
- (in French and English) Serghei Litvin, FID 2011, Le livredart, 2011
