= Lu Yin (writer) =

Chinese writer (1898–1934)

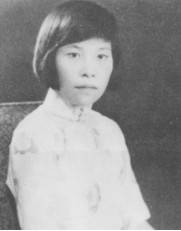
- Chinese feminist writer
- Born: 1898; Fuzhou, China
- Died: May 13, 1934 (aged 35–36); Shanghai, China
- Occupation: Writer
- Spouse(s): Guo Mengliang (m. 1923–1925), Li Weijian (m. 1930–1934)
- Writing career
- Pen name: 庐隐

Lu Yin (1898–1934) was a Chinese feminist writer of the 20th century. Her extensive body of work includes novels, short story collections and essays that explore the lives and hardships of Chinese women in the early 20th century. Lu Yin is often associated with the May Fourth movement due to her support and espousing of its ideals during her academic career and its influences that are found in her literary works. During her writing career Lu Yin advocated for women's liberation through education and wrote many critical essays on what the steps to women's emancipation in China should look like. Due to the content of her work often reflecting feminist theory and her May Fourth movement involvement, Lu Yin is cited as a prominent figure in both the canon of May Fourth writers and notable women writers of China.

== Life ==
=== Early years ===
Lu Yin was born in the Chinese province of Fujian in 1898 however, the exact date of her birth remains in question. Lu Yin's birth name is widely cited by historical resources as Huang Ying with some accounts offering the name Huang Shuyi as an alternate birth name. Lu Yin was one of four children born to the Qing dynasty official Huang Zhixian and his wife whose is unnamed in historical accounts.Upon her father's death from a heart attack, Lu Yin's mother moved the family to Beijing to live with their uncle and his family. While living at her Uncle's house Lu Yin received a very limited education, learning how to read a few Chinese characters from the Confucian Four Books For Women. In her autobiography Lu Yin often described her strained relationship with her mother and presented her childhood as a lonely and unhappy time in her life. Lu Yin's tense relationship with her mother and the neglect she faced as a child would inform the themes of many of her future writings that explored characters with unhappy childhoods.

In 1908 at the age of nine, Lu Yin's mother would send her away to a Christian missionary boarding school in Beijing where she improved her reading and writing skills to become highly literate by the end of her education at the institution. In 1911 following the violence of the Republican Revolution, Lu Yin's family briefly relocated to Tianjin. Upon the family's return to Beijing, Lu Yin was to return to the boarding school however, with the help of her brother she took the entrance exam for the Beijing middle school, Nüzi Shifan XueXiao (Beijing Women's Normal School). She enrolled at the Beijing Women's Normal School in 1912 and would continue her studies there until the age of 18, during which time Lu Yin explored her love of novels and poems despite her school's ban on reading such materials.

==== Adult years and career ====
In 1916 Lu Yin met a man named Lin Hongjun and bonded with him over their mutual interest in literature. Lin Hongjun was a relative of Lu Yin's aunt who had come to Beijing upon the death of his father. Lin met Lu Yin at a family dinner and lent her a copy of Xu Zhenya's, "Jade Pear Spirit", a melodramatic story of unrequited love. It is said that Lu Yin's love of this story led her to beg her mother to accept Lin's request to marry her however, her mother's condition for the engagement was that Lin finish his studies before the marriage. This engagement would not last as Lu Yin broke it off during her higher education years at the Beijing Women's Higher Normal School.

Upon graduation from the Beijing Women's Higher Normal School Lu Yin became an elementary school teacher in the Anhui and Henan provinces however, she did not enjoy the job and changed schools multiple times in the year and a half that she was teaching. This difficult year as a teacher inspired Lu Yin's first published story in 1923 called "Pang huang" that depicted the adversity faced by a young teacher in his first teaching position. During her time as a teacher Lu Yin saved money to attend the Beijing Women's Higher Normal School that was the first school to begin offering university courses for women in China and in 1919 she began to audit courses there. Lu Yin would attend this women's college along with Feng Yuanjun 馮元君 and Su Xuelin 蘇雪林 who also went on to become China's most celebrated women writers and during their first semester as auditors, Lu Yin and Su Xuelin would be admitted as full-time students due to their literary accomplishments. During her enrolment at the women's college Lu Yin became involved with the May Fourth Movement through her support of the movement's intellectuals and writings on the subject.

In February 1920 a letter entitled "The Association For Women's Advancement: The Hope Lies With Women" emerged as the first known published work under the name of Lu Yin and was a critical piece aimed at Guo Mengliang, a male philosophy student who wrote an article about how women's liberation should come from men rather than any efforts from the women themselves. In this published critique Lu Yin began to demonstrate her feminist leanings and would continue to do so throughout 1920 with her essays and poems that explored women's liberation in student writing forums. Lu Yin continued to explore her writing skills and in 1921 the popular Shanghai newspaper, Shishi xinbao (New Current Affairs Times) would be the first publication to release Lu Yin's short story, "Tragedy at the Bottom of the Sea" in serial form. Although the series publication of "Tragedy at the Bottom of the Sea" became popular, it was the publication of her melodramatic piece entitled "Yige zhuzuojia" (A Writer) that truly established her as a notable author and one of the few women writers of the new literary movement.

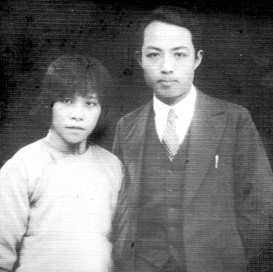
Lu Yin and Husband

In 1921 Lu Yin met the philosophy scholar Guo Mengliang through the Fujian Students Association and began exchanging letters and spending time with him publicly. The two became lovers despite Guo Mengliang already having a wife in Fujian through an arranged marriage. This relationship caused controversy among Lu Yin's inner circle, with her family and friends criticizing her choice to be with a married man and imploring her to end the affair. In the summer of 1922 Lu Yin graduated from the Beijing Women's Higher Normal School and began teaching in a rural school outside of Beijing however, by early 1923 she had moved back to Beijing and married Guo Mengliang who was now a divorcee, against the wishes of her family. The difficulties faced by Lu Yin in this relationship inspired her autobiographical melodrama entitled, "Haibin guren" that follows the tribulations of a young educated woman who gets involved with a married man. After the publication of this piece Lu Yin wouldn't write for half a year, during which time her mother died in 1924. By 1925 Lu Yin's writing career was gaining traction but this was halted when her husband died suddenly of lung disease in October of that year, leaving her with an infant daughter and financial woes. Following the death of her husband Lu Yin moved in with her in-laws' and picked up her teaching career in Fujian for six months before leaving her daughter with her mother-in-law and moving to Shanghai to teach at an all girls school.

In 1927 Lu Yin returned to Beijing where she picked up various teaching jobs and continued her writing career. Between the years of 1927 and 1931 Lu Yin wrote thirteen short stories published in magazines, one book and two short story collections. In the years between 1925 and 1927 China underwent tumultuous political change with the country coming under Nationalist party control in 1925 and the government breaking treaties with the Communist party in 1927. Although Lu Yin didn't cite these issues specifically, many of her works from this period have characters who reference the political climate with their affiliations to unnamed allegorical political parties and factions. During this period of her writing Lu Yin became close friends with another young woman author from the Beijing Woman's Higher Normal School named Shi Pingmei. These two women shared many of the same romantic experiences, with both women becoming involved with married men who died suddenly and around the same time. During her life, Shi Pingmei had been very close to Lu Yin with an intimacy that was similar to heterosexual love and the two writers often publicly displayed their friendship through their published poems, essays and stories. Upon Shi's death in 1928 from meningitis, Lu Yin had her buried near her lover with matching poems carved into the headstones; this was against cultural morality at the time, as Shi's lover was never her husband. Following the death of Lu Yin's close friend Shi Pingmei, Lu Yin also lost her brother shortly thereafter and with his death, fell into a depressive state.

After her period of grieving Lu Yin began to interact with other scholars again and started the literary journal named Huayan yuekan. With the creation of this literary journal, Lu Yin began engaging with more young writers who wanted to have their work published and one of these writers was a student from Qinghua University named Li Weijian. After their initial meeting Lu Yin and Li Weijian began to meet frequently, taking walks and having public outings as lovers. This relationship caused much controversy due to Lu Yin's status as a widowed mother of a young daughter and the nine year age gap between her and her younger lover. During the period from February 14 to April 8, 1930, sixty-eight of the couple's love letters were published and depicted the development of their relationship for readers intrigued by Lu Yin's status as a notable woman writer and the identity of her younger lover. In the summer of 1930 Lu Yin and Li Weijian went to Tokyo to elope and live a quiet life in Japan however, financial burden caused them to move back to China at the end of 1930. Upon their departure from Japan, the couple first moved to Hangzhou and in August 1931 they would settle in Shanghai where Lu Yin would give birth to a daughter soon after their arrival. During this period of time spent in Hangzhou and Shanghai Lu Yin wrote many works including essays, short stories and a novel based on the life of Shi Pingmei entitled The Ivory Ring, that includes Lu Yin acting as the narrator of Shi Pingmei's fictionalized story. Lu Yin continued to write prolifically in the 3 years before her death, producing notable works such as the Thorns of Roses essays (1933), her novel The Heart of a Woman (1933), and the more politically focused novel entitled Flames, published posthumously in 1936.

===== Death =====
In the preface to his work entitled Dongjing xiaopin, Lu Yin's husband says that in May 1934 Lu Yin underwent surgery to repair what was described as a hemorrhaging uterus. Lu Yin survived her surgery but would die days later on May 13, 1934, from complications that historians consistently cite as relating to pregnancy and labour however, the exact medical explanation for her death still remains unclear despite her husband's account.

== Lu Yin and the May Fourth Movement ==
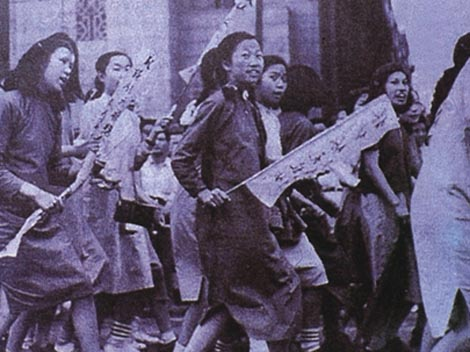
Female students participating in the May Fourth Movement student demonstration.

Lu Yin enrolled in the Beijing Women's Higher Normal School in 1919 and would continue her education there until 1922. Historically this school is known for its students' involvement in the May Fourth Movement protests and its faculty, composed of established May Fourth intellectuals like Hu Shi. During her period of study the New Culture Movement and the May Fourth Movement were in full swing and Lu Yin attended lectures from the May Fourth intellectual Hu Shi. Additionally, Lu Yin read many of the new magazines from the movement and supported the opinions of the May Fourth intellectuals throughout her career at the Higher Normal School. During this time Lu Yin was also made the representative for her school and the vice-chairperson of the Fujian Students Association that was created as a consequence of the killing of a student during May Fourth demonstrations in support of the boycott of Japanese goods. As the May Fourth movement espoused ideas of female emancipation and resistance to traditionally restrictive roles for women through education, Lu Yin gravitated towards its principles, the influence of which can be seen in her early writings that contributed to her prominence as a May Fourth woman writer.

== Lu Yin and the Chinese Feminist Movement ==
The birth of the Chinese feminist movement is often attributed to the female theorist He-Yin Zhen who wrote about the historical and contemporary oppression of women in Chinese society as well as the intersectional workings of class, morality, capitalism, economics and politics in the upholding of that oppression. Like He-Yin Zhen, Lu Yin was also concerned with women's liberation and specifically focused her critiques on the impacts of social, educational, economic and wage inequality on the emancipation of women in China. In Lu Yin's essays on women's liberation she explores the word "ren" that refers to a person who draws from education and self-reflection to cultivate an understanding of themselves and the world around them. This understanding of the word, "ren" became linked to the idea that to be human and a valuable part of society, one must be educated and have knowledge about the world and people outside themselves thus, as women were historically uneducated and kept cloistered in their inner chambers, it followed that they were neither fully human nor valuable members of society. For this reason, Lu Yin viewed education as a means for elevating women's status to personhood in society and advocated ardently for women's education in her critical pieces as the necessary first step to women's liberation. In terms of Lu Yin's relationship to feminism and the May Fourth movement, she was quite critical of the movement's male scholars' advocacy for female liberation, as she viewed their involvement as a means of controlling women's narratives while playing the role of hero. From the beginning of her writing career until her death, Lu Yin never ceased in her advocacy for women's equality in China through equal access to education, economic opportunities as well as the involvement of women in civil duties and Chinese society, for these reasons, Lu Yin is considered one of China's foremost women writers of the Feminist movement.

== Literary themes in Lu Yin's works ==
Lu Yin is recognized mainly as a fiction author and feminist rhetorician whose writings aimed to highlight social injustices and the difficulties faced by Chinese women in the 20th century. Lu Yin often framed her stories with female protagonists through the lens of a diary or letters to give an intimate look at the thoughts and sentiments of the female mind and establish female subjectivity. This female subjectivity allowed Lu Yin to depict more sentimentally themed works centred on female friendships in a style that distinguished her work from that of her male counterparts and contributed to the evolution of Chinese women's writing into forms such as novels and longer works. Lu Yin's writings on female friendship and the lives of women often contained themes of suicide, depression, cynical outlooks on love and the hardships of married life.

Lu Yin's earlier work reflected her education during the May Fourth movement and dealt with themes of young intellectuals navigating the changing times and resisting against tradition, as was common for May Fourth era literature. Lu Yin's May Fourth-era work often focused on autobiographically young, educated female protagonists who were framed by first person narratives to depict their struggles in society. The majority of Lu Yin's writings were autobiographically based, with her characters reflecting the different stages in her life from student, to wife, to friend, with the theme of the disillusioned educated woman becoming a notable trope across all her works. In her later works Lu Yin changed her writing style from autobiographically based fiction to more outward looking stories that dealt with political and historical issues and tragedy outside of her individual experience such as in her piece entitled Flames and her short story, Factory girl.

== Notable works ==
This is a list of some of Lu Yin's major works including her autobiography, novels, essays, poems and letters.

1. Old Friends by the Sea Shore (1925)
2. Manli (1928)
3. A Returning Wild Goose (1930)
4. Thorns of Roses (1933)
5. A Woman's Heart (1933)
6. The Ivory Ring (1934)
7. Lu Yin's Autobiography (1934)
8. Glimpse of Tokyo (1935)
9. Flames (1936)

== Portrait ==
- Lu Yin. A Portrait by Kong Kai Ming at Portrait Gallery of Chinese Writers (Hong Kong Baptist University Library).
