= Tianjin Academy of Fine Arts =

Art school in Tianjin, China

- 天津美术学院
- Type: Public art college
- Established: 1906
- President: Jiang Lu
- Location: Tianjin, China
- Website: tjarts.edu.cn

The Tianjin Academy of Fine Arts (TJ Arts; Chinese: 天津美术学院) is a public art college in Tianjin, China. The academy is sponsored by the Tianjin Municipal People's Government.

The Tianjin Academy of Fine Arts was founded in 1906 with the original name of Peiyang Female Normal School (北洋女师范学堂), which has a long history and it is also a comprehensive college providing a wide variety of subjects. It is the most important arts education center in the north part of China.

== History ==
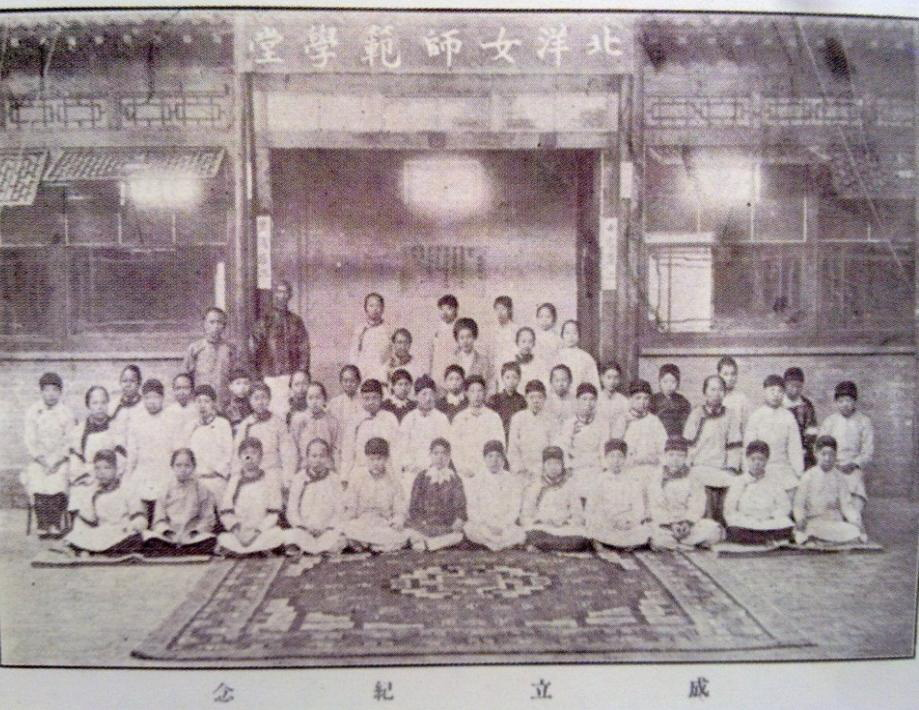
Beiyang Women's Normal School in 1912

The Beiyang Women's Normal School was founded in 1906 by Lü Bicheng although Fine Art was not established at the school until 1926. In 1929 it became the Hebei Provincial Women's Normal Academy. In 1949 men were admitted to the facility and it was renamed the Henei Normal Arts Academy. In 1959 the part that dealt specifically with Fine Art became the Henei Academy of Fine Art.

== Description ==
The academy consists of the Arts Design School, Plastic Arts School and Contemporary Art School. Also, there are the Departments of Chinese Painting, Art History, Art Theory and the Adult Education School. The academy offers 17 sub-majors including Chinese Painting, Oil Painting, Graphic Art, Sculpture, Visual Arts Design, Decorating Design, Industrial Design, Environmental Design, Fashion Design, Dyeing and Weaving Design, Arts Education, History and Theory, Multimedia, Digital-media, Photograph Arts, Public Arts, Compositive Arts, etc.

The academy has sufficient teaching staff. There are a group of art educators and famous scholars who have a high reputation both at home and abroad. Now the academy has 367 art teaching and administrative staff, among whom are nearly 200 full-time teachers including 95 professors and associate professors. TAFA has 3391 undergraduate students and 259 graduate students.

== Notable alumni ==
- Ren Han
- Shi Pingmei
- Yan Binghui
- Yueqi Zhang
