= Taoranting Park =

City park in Beijing, China

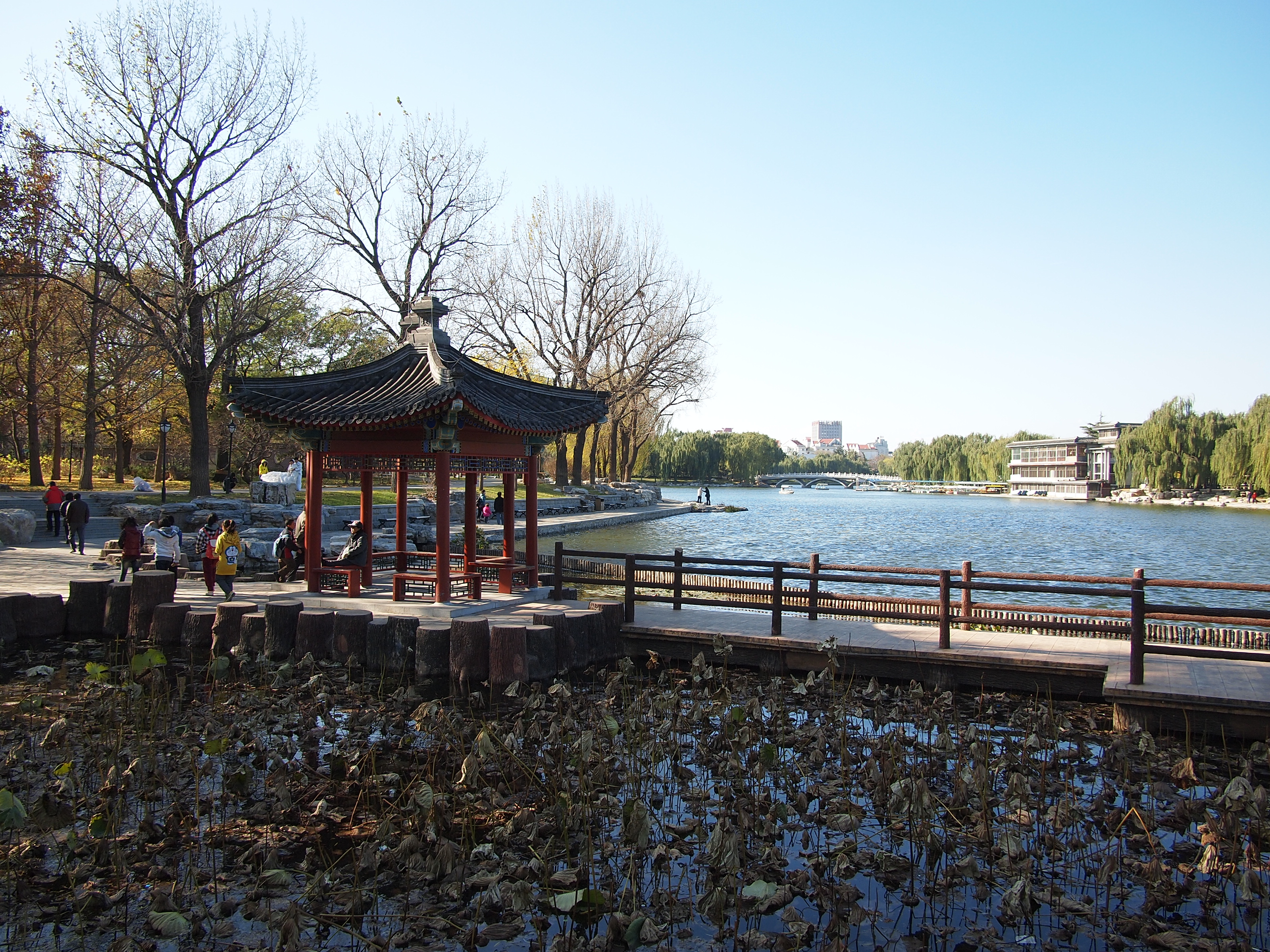
- East Lake of Taoranting Park

- Location within Beijing Location within China
- Type: Urban park
- Location: Beijing, China
- Coordinates: 39.872439°N 116.375463°E
- Area: 59 acres (24 ha)
- Created: 1695 (the Pavilion); 1952 (the Park)
- Owner: Beijing Municipal Administration Center of Parks
- Status: Open all year

Taoranting Park (simplified Chinese: 陶然亭公园; traditional Chinese: 陶然亭公園; pinyin: Táorántíng Gōngyuán, also known as Leasure Pavilion Park or Taoran Pavilion Park) is a major city park located in Xicheng District to the north of Beijing South railway station, in the southern part of the city. A former location for literati to get together, while most of Beijing's gardens were reserved only for imperial families during the Qing dynasty, it gained its name from a poem by the Tang dynasty poet Bai Juyi, "Wait till the chrysanthemums are yellow and home-made wine is ripe, (I'll) drink with you and be carefree." (更待菊黄家酿熟，与君一醉一陶然).

The park has a total area of 59 acres (240,000 m^{2}), and water area accounts for 17 acres (69,000 m^{2}). It was built in 1952. There are Cibei An, Taoran Pavilion in it. It also hosts the tomb of the lovers Gao Junyu and Shi Pingmei. This story has been retold in a book and a film. Gao Junyu and Shi's graves are a place of pilgrimage for young couples as well as that of Sai Jinhua.

The history of this park could be traced back to the Qing dynasty. The Taoran Pavilion was built in the 34th year of the Kangxi Emperor's reign (1695). The chief engineer, Jiang Zao (江藻), who supervised the kiln workshop, oversaw the construction. There is also an old temple, which was built during the Yuan dynasty (1276–1368), located within the park.

The park has a lake with many pavilions scattered around its bank. It is popular with residents and visitors for walking and boating.

== Gallery ==
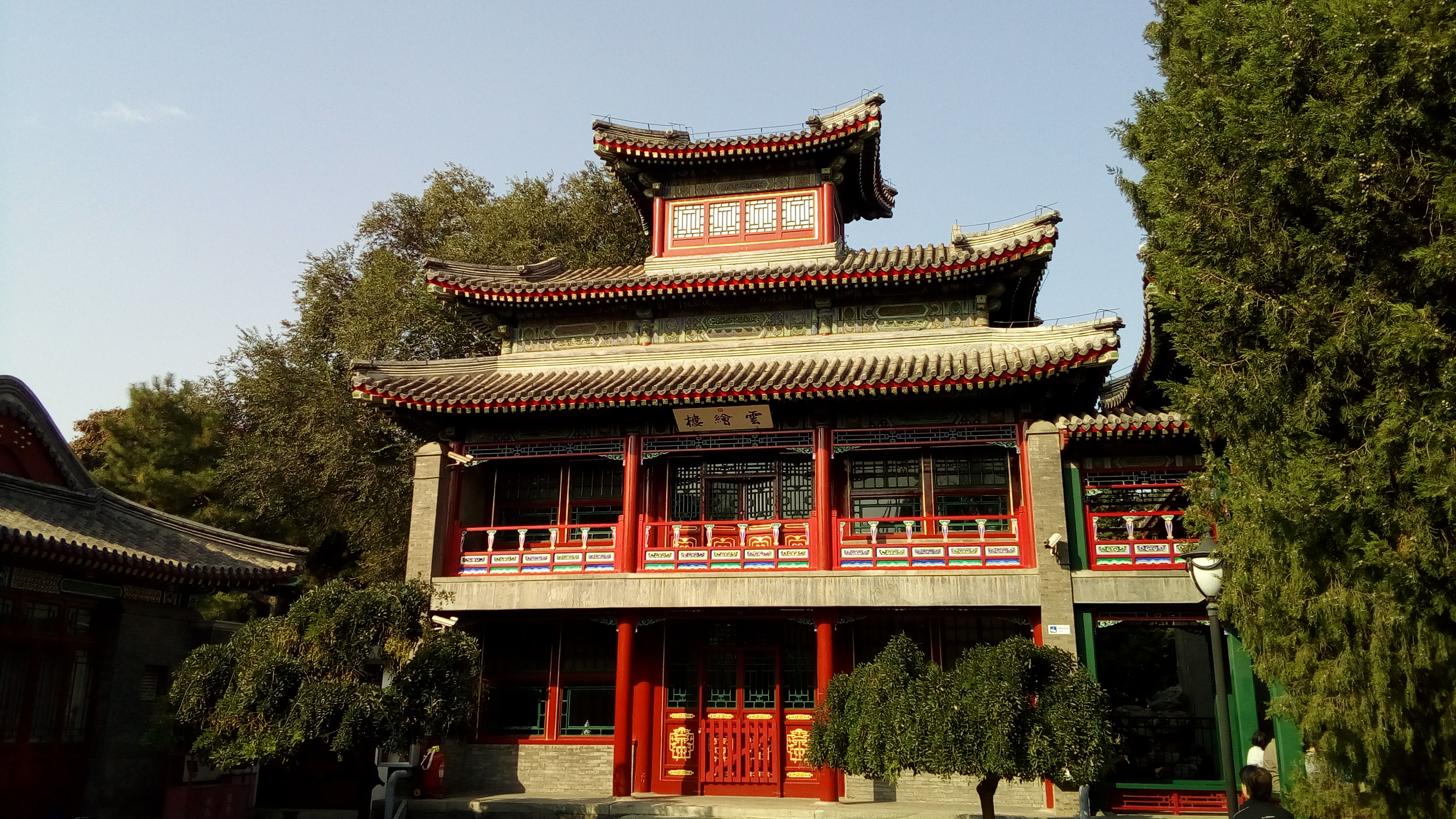
