= Yuzhou, Henan =

Yuzhou 禹州市
- County-level city
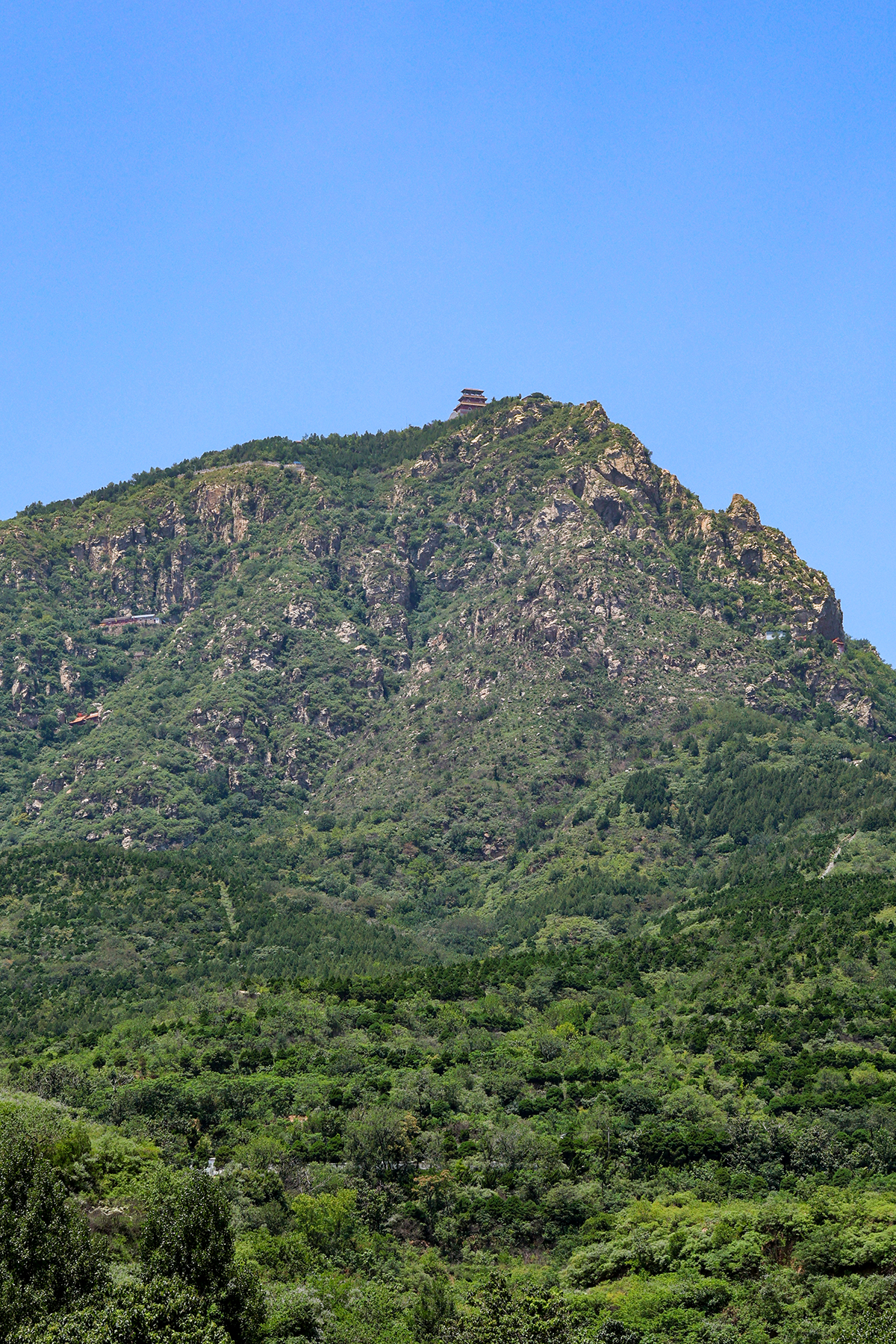
- City God Temple Confucian Temple Baishan Pagoda Bolingweng Temple Mount Juci Zhou of Ming Tomb Jun Ware Museum

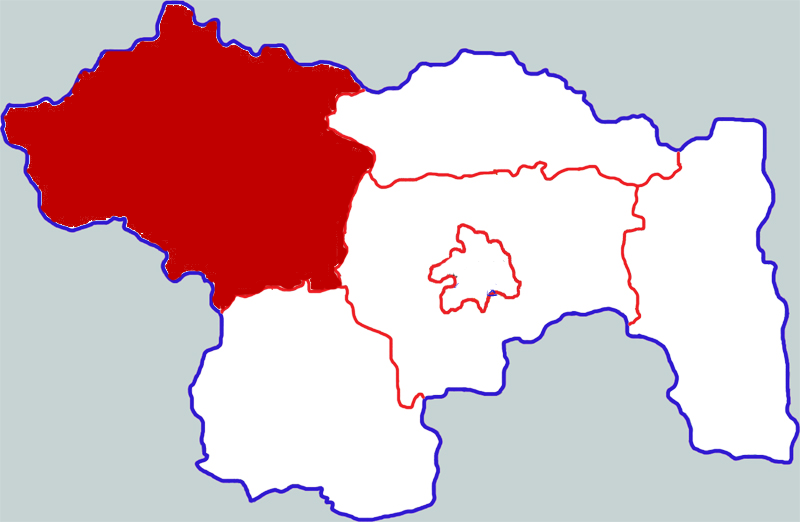
- Yuzhou in Xuchang

- Location in Henan
- Coordinates: 34°08′31″N 113°29′20″E
- Country: People's Republic of China
- Province: Henan
- Prefecture-level city: Xuchang
- Established Date: 25 June 1998

Government
  - Party Secretary: Wang Hongwu
  - Mayor: Fan Xiaodong

Area
  - Total: 1,472 km^{2} (568 sq mi)

Population (2019)
  - Total: 1,167,000
- Time zone: UTC+8 (China Standard)
- Postal code: 461670
- Area code: 0374
- Website: www.yuzhou.gov.cn

Yuzhou (Chinese: 禹州; pinyin: Yǔzhōu; Wade–Giles: Yü-chou) is a county-level city in the central part of Henan, People's Republic of China. Yuzhou City, referred to as "Jun", was called Yangzhai, Junzhou and Yingchuan in ancient times, and also called Xiadu, Jundu and Medicine Capital. It occupies the northwest corner of the prefecture-level city of Xuchang. The city is named for Yu the Great, the founder of the Xia Dynasty, which the city's government claims was founded in present-day Yuzhou, and that the dynasty's capital was located in present-day Yuzhou. There is a statue of Yu the Great in Yuzhou, and he serves as a symbol of the city.

The famous Jun ware (钧瓷) of porcelain originates in Yuzhou, specifically, in the town of Shenhou (神垕镇). Jun ware comprises one of the Five Great Kilns, a group of highly esteemed porcelain types from the Song dynasty. Yuzhou has historically served as a major center of traditional Chinese medicine, and the city's historic medicinal tradition has been recognized by the national government. Famous Chinese doctor Sun Simiao (孙思邈) had been a doctor in Yuzhou for a long period of time during the Tang dynasty.

Nicknames for the city include "Summer Capital" (Chinese: 夏都; pinyin: xià dū), "Jun Capital" (Chinese: 钧都; pinyin: jūn dū), and "Medicine Capital" (Chinese: 药都; pinyin: yào dū). Yuzhou was named the first historical and cultural city in Henan Province in 1989. In 2011, it was named "China Ceramics Historical and Cultural City", and in 2018, it was named "National Health City" by the National Patriotic Health Campaign Committee.

== History ==
The Wadian archeological site, part of a network of sites belonging to the Late Neolithic Longshan culture, is located in Yuzhou. The Wadian site spans an area of about 1,000,000 square metres (0.39 mi^{2}), and contains a large complex believed to be an ancestral temple.

Yuzhou was changed from a county to a county-level city in 1988.

At the beginning of January 2022, it was forced into a COVID-19 lockdown after three asymptomatic cases of COVID-19 variants were discovered.

== Geography ==
Located in central Henan Province, the transition zone between Funiu Mountain and southeast Henan Plain, the city covers an area of 1469 square kilometers, and the general trend of terrain is tilted from northwest to southeast.

Yuzhou's urban center is located 60 kilometres (37 mi) from Xinzheng International Airport, and 80 kilometres (50 mi) from the urban center of the provincial capital of Zhengzhou.

23.24% of Yuzhou's area is forested.

== Climate ==
Climate data for Yuzhou, elevation 146 m (479 ft), (1991–2020 normals, extremes 1981–2010)
Month	Jan	Feb	Mar	Apr	May	Jun	Jul	Aug	Sep	Oct	Nov	Dec	Year
Record high °C (°F)	20.8 (69.4)	23.9 (75.0)	27.5 (81.5)	35.4 (95.7)	40.3 (104.5)	40.1 (104.2)	40.4 (104.7)	38.5 (101.3)	37.6 (99.7)	34.9 (94.8)	28.3 (82.9)	22.8 (73.0)	40.4 (104.7)
Mean daily maximum °C (°F)	6.4 (43.5)	10.1 (50.2)	15.6 (60.1)	22.1 (71.8)	27.6 (81.7)	32.0 (89.6)	32.0 (89.6)	30.7 (87.3)	26.9 (80.4)	21.9 (71.4)	14.7 (58.5)	8.5 (47.3)	20.7 (69.3)
Daily mean °C (°F)	1.0 (33.8)	4.1 (39.4)	9.6 (49.3)	15.9 (60.6)	21.5 (70.7)	26.0 (78.8)	27.3 (81.1)	25.9 (78.6)	21.3 (70.3)	15.8 (60.4)	8.8 (47.8)	3.0 (37.4)	15.0 (59.0)
Mean daily minimum °C (°F)	−3.3 (26.1)	−0.6 (30.9)	4.4 (39.9)	10.1 (50.2)	15.7 (60.3)	20.4 (68.7)	23.3 (73.9)	22.2 (72.0)	17.1 (62.8)	11.1 (52.0)	4.1 (39.4)	−1.3 (29.7)	10.3 (50.5)
Record low °C (°F)	−16.9 (1.6)	−18.8 (−1.8)	−7.7 (18.1)	−1.1 (30.0)	3.0 (37.4)	11.0 (51.8)	15.9 (60.6)	11.5 (52.7)	5.3 (41.5)	−1.4 (29.5)	−8.5 (16.7)	−12.2 (10.0)	−18.8 (−1.8)
Average precipitation mm (inches)	8.8 (0.35)	11.7 (0.46)	22.5 (0.89)	36.4 (1.43)	58.1 (2.29)	81.9 (3.22)	146.5 (5.77)	117.0 (4.61)	75.9 (2.99)	41.6 (1.64)	29.2 (1.15)	8.6 (0.34)	638.2 (25.14)
Average precipitation days (≥ 0.1 mm)	3.8	4.4	5.4	6.0	7.7	8.0	10.9	10.7	9.2	6.4	5.7	3.6	81.8
Average snowy days	4.2	3.1	1.4	0.2	0	0	0	0	0	0	1.0	2.4	12.3
Average relative humidity (%)	61	62	61	65	64	65	78	81	77	70	68	61	68
Mean monthly sunshine hours	125.5	135.4	171.3	197.8	209.2	197.3	179.3	175.8	152.8	152.7	138.7	133.7	1,969.5
Percentage possible sunshine	40	43	46	50	48	46	41	43	42	44	45	44	44
Source: China Meteorological Administration

== Administrative divisions ==
Yuzhou is directly divided into 5 subdistricts, 19 towns, 1 township, and 1 ethnic township. These 26 township-level divisions then further administer 678 village-level divisions.

=== Subdistricts ===
- Yingchuan Subdistrict (颍川街道)
- Xiadu Subdistrict (夏都街道)
- Hancheng Subdistrict (韩城街道)
- Juntai Subdistrict (钧台街道)
- Chuhe Subdistrict (褚河街道)

=== Towns ===
- Huolong (火龙镇)
- Shundian (顺店镇)
- Fangshan (方山镇)
- Shenhou (神垕镇)
- Hongchang (鸿畅镇)
- Liangbei (梁北镇)
- Gucheng (古城镇)
- Wuliang (无梁镇)
- Wenshu (文殊镇)
- Jiushan (鸠山镇)
- Fanpo (范坡镇)
- Goulian (郭连镇)
- Zhuge (朱阁镇)
- Qianjing (浅井镇)
- Fanggang (方岗镇)
- Huashi (花石镇)
- Zhangde (张得镇)
- Changzhuang (苌庄镇)
- Xiaolü (小吕镇)

=== Townships ===
- Mojie Township (磨街乡)

=== Ethnic townships ===
- Shanhuo Hui Ethnic Township (山货回族乡)

== Demographics ==
As of 2020, the per capita disposable income of Yuzhou's urban residents reached 35,330 renminbi (RMB), a 1.6% increase from 2019. This figure stood at 20,442 RMB for the city's rural residents, a 6.3% increase from 2019. 52% of Yuzhou's residents live in urban areas.

95% of Yuzhou's population is connected to the city's water grid, 90% of the population has a gas connection, and 58% receive municipal heating.

As of March 2023, the total population of Yuzhou is 1.3 million, and the urban permanent population is 470,000.

== Economy ==
In 2022, Yuzhou's GDP reached 92.69 billion yuan, an increase of 2.7%. Revenue in the general public budget was 3.05 billion yuan, up 12% year on year.

Yuzhou is located in the Central Plains Economic Zone, an economic region of central Henan province, and borders the Zhengzhou Airport Economy Zone.

=== Agriculture ===
Crops used in traditional Chinese medicine are grown in large quantities in Yuzhou, and a 2021 government publication estimates that about 26,667 hectares (65,900 acres) of cropland are used to grow plants for use in traditional Chinese medicine. The same report estimated that 11,333 hectares (28,000 acres) of cropland in Yuzhou is used to grow sweet potatoes. Grains are also grown in large quantities throughout the city, and a large number of pigs are raised Yuzhou.

=== Natural resources ===
The area of Yuzhou is home to significant deposits of coal, limestone, bauxite, and clay.

=== Electricity generation ===
The city is home to thermal power plants with a capacity of 2.02 million kilowatts.

== Transportation ==
=== Rail ===
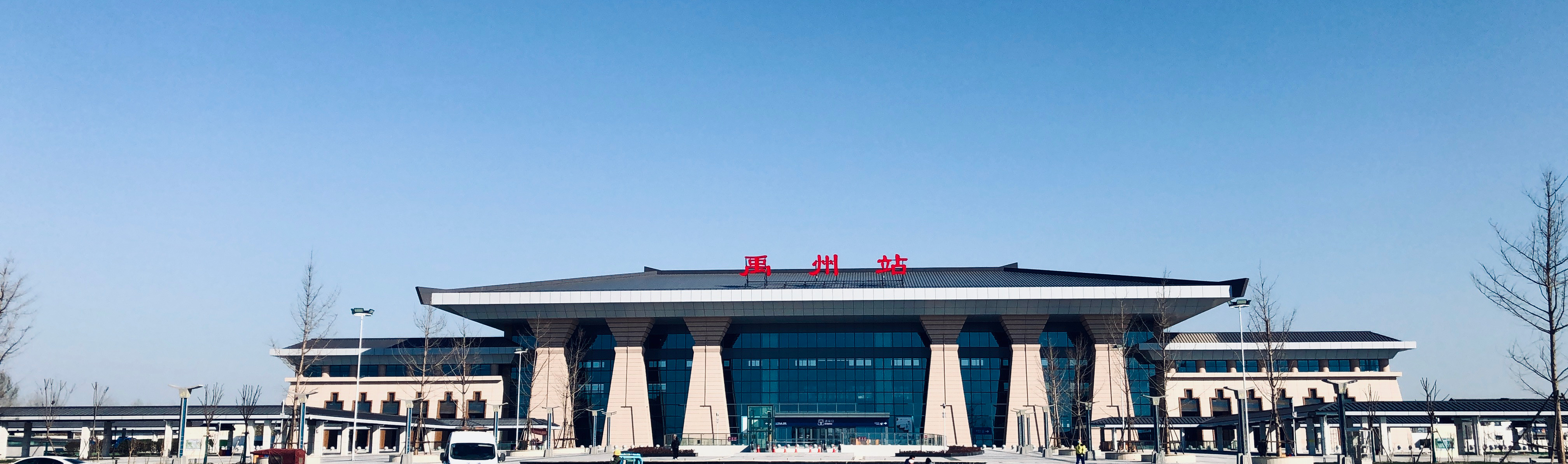
Yuzhou railway station

The Beijing–Guangzhou railway passes through east of Yuzhou. The Yuzhou–Dengfeng railway (Chinese: 禹登铁路; pinyin: Yǔ–Dēng tiělù) runs through the western portion of Yuzhou, connecting the city to nearby Dengfeng. The Yuzhou–Bozhou railway begins in the city, linking it to the prefecture-level city of Bozhou in northwestern Anhui province.

=== Major roads ===
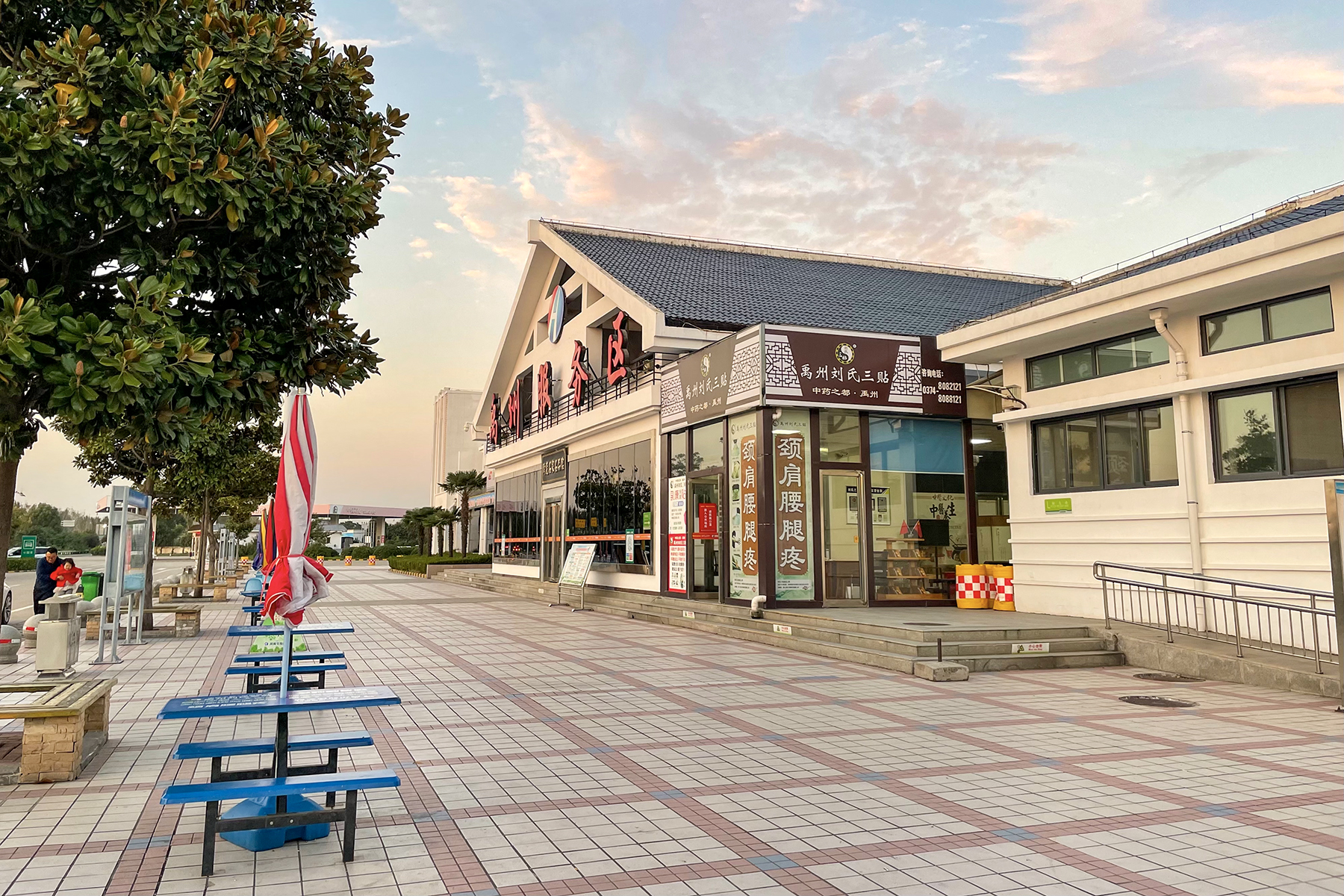
A service area along the S88 Zhengzhou–Xixia Expressway

China National Highway 030 passes through east of Yuzhou. Major roads which run through Yuzhou include the G1516 Yancheng–Luoyang Expressway, the S88 Zhengzhou–Xixia Expressway, and Henan provincial highways S103, S237, and S325.

=== Tourist attraction ===
There are Shen垕 ancient town, Junguan kiln site museum, Dahongzhai, China Jun porcelain Culture Park and other tourist attractions.

=== Celebrity ===
There were Han Fei, Lu Buwei, Zhang Liang, Wu Daozi, Chao Cuo, Chu Suiliang, Guo Jia, Sima Hui and other famous historical figures in Yuzhou.
