= Zhuge Liang =

Chinese statesman and strategist (181–234)

- 諸葛亮
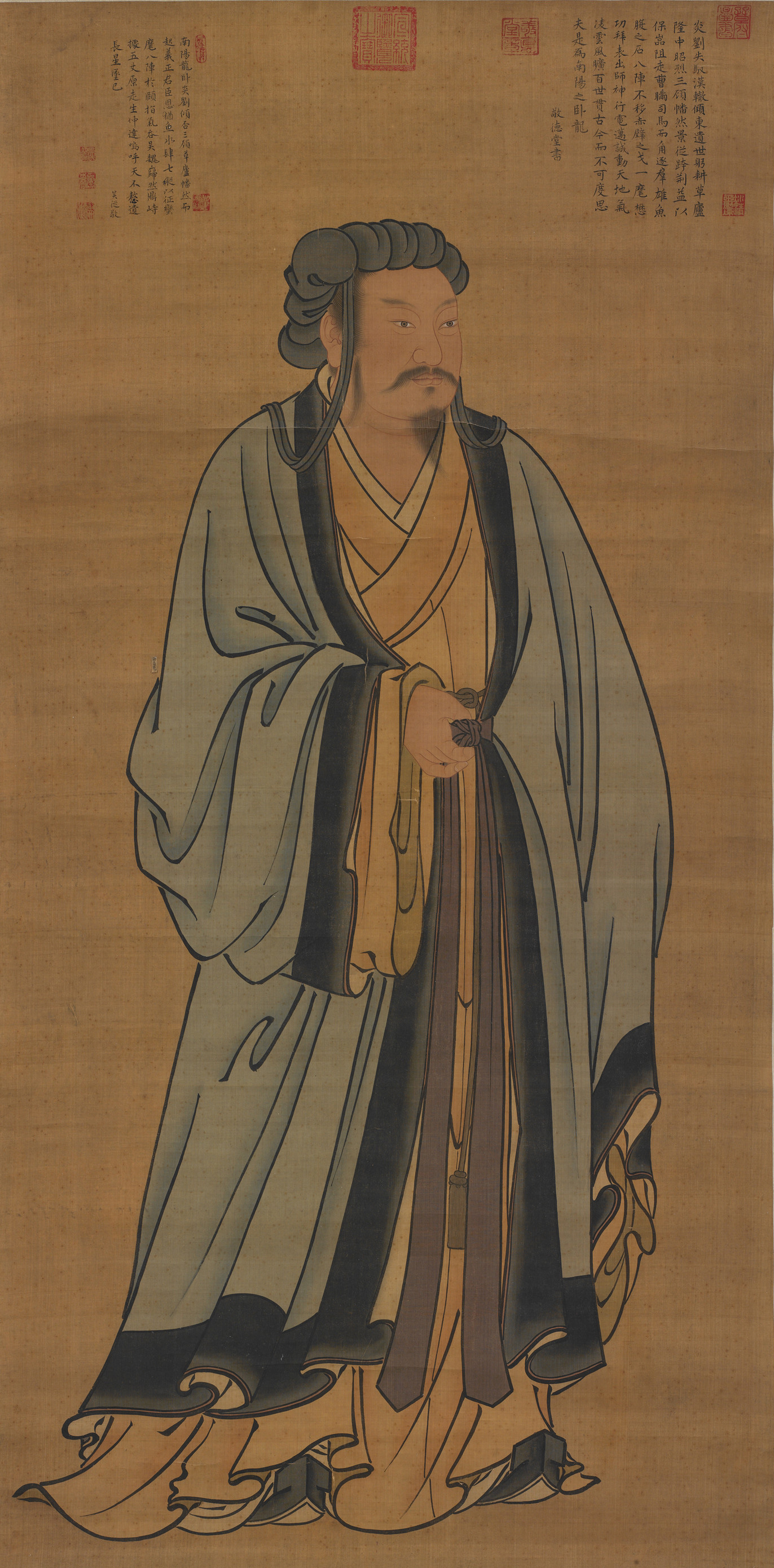
- Ming Dynasty illustration of Zhuge Liang

Imperial Chancellor of Shu Han
- In office 229 – 8 October 234
- In office May 221 – 228
- Monarch: Liu Bei / Liu Shan

General of the Right
- In office 228 – 229
- Monarch: Liu Shan

Governor of Yi Province
- In office 223 – 8 October 234
- Monarch: Liu Shan
- Succeeded by: Jiang Wan (as Inspector)

Colonel-Director of Retainers
- In office 221 – 8 October 234
- Monarch: Liu Bei / Liu Shan
- Preceded by: Zhang Fei

Deputy Head of the Secretariat
- In office 221 – 8 October 234
- Monarch: Liu Bei / Liu Shan
- Succeeded by: Jiang Wan

Personal details
- Born: 23 July 181 Yangdu, Langya Commandery (now Yinan County, Shandong)
- Died: 8 October 234 (aged 54) (Note: The Sanguozhi recorded that Zhuge Liang fell sick and died in the 8th lunar month of the 12th year of the Jianxing era in Liu Shan's reign. (Note: Chen and Pei 429, 35.925: "其年八月，亮疾病，卒于軍，時年五十四。") This month corresponds to 11 September to 10 October 234 in the Gregorian calendar.) Wuzhang Plains (now in Qishan, Shaanxi)
- Resting place: Mount Dingjun, Shaanxi
- Spouse: Lady Huang
- Relations: Zhuge Jin (brother); Zhuge Dan (cousin); Zhuge Xuan (cousin)
- Children: Zhuge Qiao (adopted); Zhuge Zhan; Zhuge Huai; Zhuge Guo
- Parent: Zhuge Gui (father)
- Occupation: Statesman, military leader, scholar, inventor
- Courtesy name: Kongming (孔明)
- Posthumous name: Marquis Zhongwu (忠武侯)
- Peerage: Marquis of Wu District (武鄉侯)
- Nicknames: "Sleeping Dragon" (臥龍 / 伏龍)

Zhuge Liang
- Traditional Chinese: 諸葛亮
- Simplified Chinese: 诸葛亮
Transcriptions
Standard Mandarin
- Hanyu Pinyin: Zhūgě Liàng
- Wade–Giles: Chu^{1}-ko^{3} Liang^{4}
- IPA: [ʈʂú.kɤ̀ ljâŋ]
Wu
- Romanization: Tsü-keʔ Liang
Yue: Cantonese
- Yale Romanization: Jyū-got Leuhng
- Jyutping: Zyu1-got3 Loeng6
- IPA: [tsy˥.kɔt̚˧ lœŋ˨]
Southern Min
- Hokkien POJ: Chu-kat Liōng
- Tâi-lô: Tsu-kat Liōng
Middle Chinese
- Middle Chinese: *t͡ɕɨʌ kɑt̚ lɨɐŋ^{H}

Courtesy name
- Chinese: 孔明
Transcriptions
Standard Mandarin
- Hanyu Pinyin: Kǒngmíng
- Gwoyeu Romatzyh: Koong-ming
- Wade–Giles: Kʻung^{3}-ming^{2}
- IPA: [kʰʊ̀ŋmǐŋ]
Yue: Cantonese
- Yale Romanization: Húng-mìhng
- Jyutping: Hung2-ming4
Southern Min
- Hokkien POJ: Khóng-bîng
Middle Chinese
- Middle Chinese: *kʰuŋ^{X} mˠiæŋ

Zhuge Liang (23 July 181 AD – 8 October 234 AD), courtesy name Kongming, was a Chinese statesman and strategist who lived through the collapse of the Eastern Han dynasty and became the principal architect of the Shu Han state. He served as chancellor under its founding emperor Liu Bei from 221 and as regent to the young emperor Liu Shan after 223 until his death.

Orphaned early, Zhuge Liang followed his uncle to Jing Province and later lived in seclusion at Longzhong, where his intellect and ambitions earned him the sobriquet "Sleeping Dragon". Liu Bei sought him out three times, after which Zhuge Liang proposed the Longzhong Plan: securing Jing and Yi provinces, allying with Eastern Wu, and resisting Cao Wei. He subsequently served as Liu Bei's chief strategist and played a key role in the alliance that led to Cao Cao's defeat at the Battle of Red Cliffs.

After helping found Shu Han, Zhuge Liang exercised near-total authority over both civil and military affairs. He governed with strict discipline and clear laws, emphasizing meritocratic appointments, agricultural development, and administrative integrity. His political thought blended Confucianism with Legalism, advocating benevolence alongside firm institutions and impartial rewards and punishments. Militarily, he pacified the southwest and led repeated northern expeditions against Cao Wei, including the Battle of Mount Qi. His Chu Shi Biao, an address of loyalty and statecraft to Liu Shan, is regarded as a masterpiece of Chinese prose.

Zhuge Liang died in 234 at the Wuzhang Plains while on campaign and was posthumously honored as Marquis Zhongwu. His legacy was immortalized in the 14th-century novel Romance of the Three Kingdoms, which portrays him as a near-sage embodiment of wisdom and loyalty.

== Historical sources ==
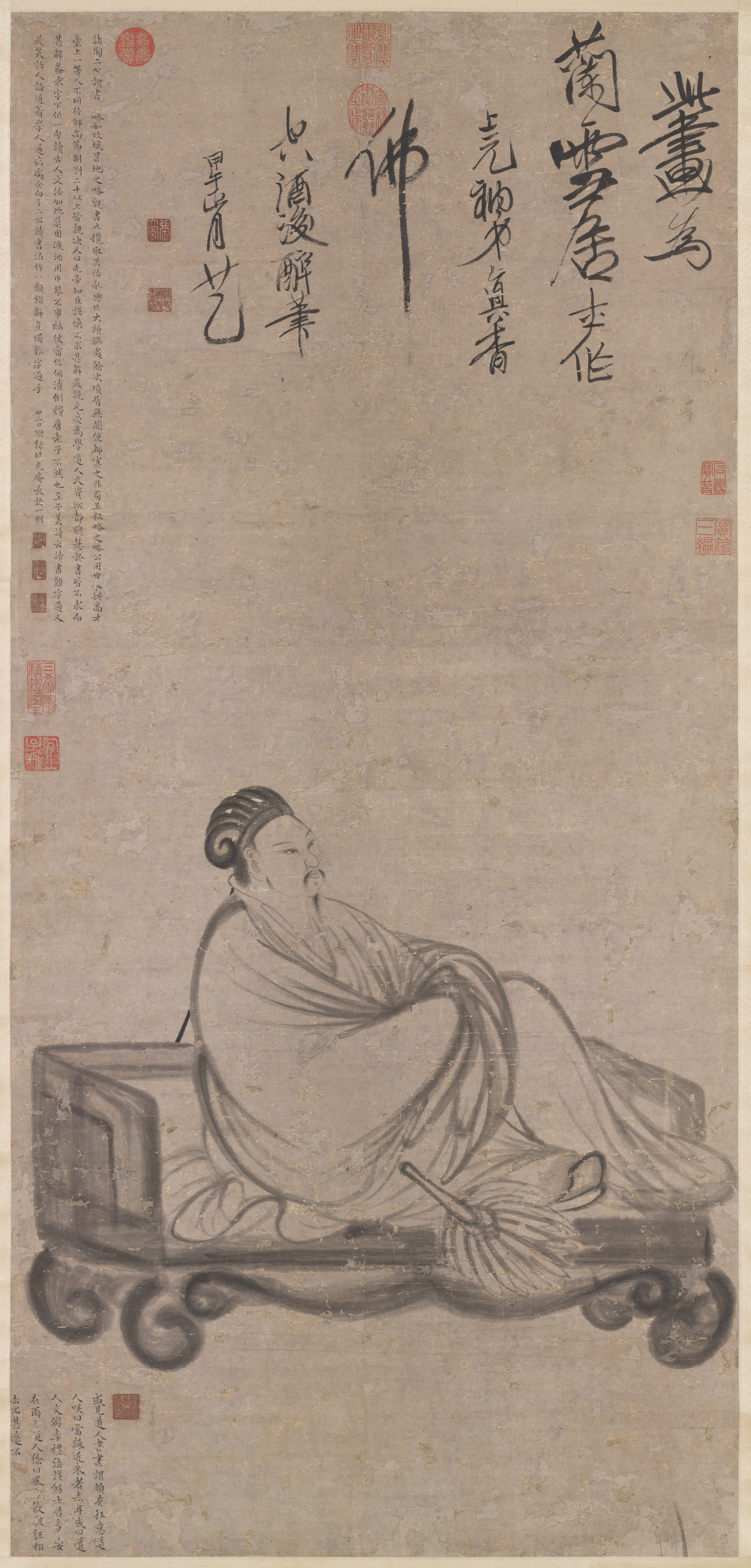
Zhang Feng's painting (1654) depicting Zhuge Liang reclining on a daybed

The authoritative historical source on Zhuge Liang's life is his biography in Volume 35 of the Records of the Three Kingdoms (Sanguozhi), which was written by the historian Chen Shou (233–297) in the third century. Chen Shou had worked in the historical offices of the Shu Han government, and had previously collated Zhuge Liang's writings into an anthology. The scope of this collection may have been limited to official government documents.

In the fifth century, the Liu Song dynasty historian Pei Songzhi (372–451) annotated the Sanguozhi by incorporating information from other sources into Chen Shou's original work and adding his personal commentary. Some alternative texts used in the annotations to the Sanguozhi include:

- Xiandi Chunqiu (獻帝春秋; Chronicles of Emperor Xian) by Yuan Wei (袁暐)
- Han Jin Chunqiu (漢晉春秋; Chronicles of Han and Jin) by Xi Zuochi
- Xiangyang Ji (襄陽記; Records of Xiangyang) by Xi Zuochi
- Wei Shu (魏書; Book of Wei) by Wang Chen, Xun Yi and Ruan Ji
- Weilüe (魏略; Brief History of Wei) by Yu Huan
- Wei Shi Chunqiu (魏氏春秋; Chronicles of the Ruling Family of Wei) by Sun Sheng
- Jin Yang Qiu (晉陽秋) by Sun Sheng
- Yuanzi (袁子) by Yuan Zhun (袁準)
- Shu Ji (蜀記; Records of Shu) by Wang Yin (王隱)
- Wu Shu (吳書; Book of Wu) by Wei Zhao
- Lingling Xianxian Zhuan (零陵先賢傳; Biographies of the Departed Worthies of Lingling)

During the Qing dynasty, the historian Zhang Zhu (張澍; 1776–1847) compiled and arranged multiple pieces of literature on Zhuge Liang into an 11-volume collection called Zhuge Zhongwu Hou Wen Ji (諸葛忠武侯文集; Literature Collection of Marquis Zhuge Zhongwu). The collection contained, among other things, a preface by Zhang Zhu, Zhuge Liang's biography from the Sanguozhi, Zhuge Liang's writings, imperial edicts issued to Zhuge Liang, and appraisals of Zhuge Liang. In 1960, Duan Xizhong (段熙仲) and Wen Xuchu (聞旭初) annotated and reorganised Zhang Zhu's original collection, and had it published by the Zhonghua Book Company under the title Zhuge Liang Ji (諸葛亮集; Collected Works of Zhuge Liang).

== Family background ==
Zhuge Liang's ancestral home was in Yangdu County (陽都縣), Langya Commandery, near present-day Yinan County or Yishui County in Shandong. There are two other accounts of his ancestral origins in the Wu Shu (吳書) and Fengsu Tongyi (風俗通義).

The Wu Shu recorded that his ancestral family name was actually Ge (葛) and his ancestors were originally from Zhu County, Langya (諸縣; southwest of present-day Zhucheng, Shandong) before they settled in Yangdu County. As there was already another Ge family in Yangdu County before they came, the locals referred to the newcomers as the Zhuge – combining Zhu (County) and Ge – to distinguish them from the other Ge family. Over time, Zhuge Liang's ancestors adopted Zhuge as their family name. (Note: Wei, Book of Wu: "其先葛氏，本琅邪諸縣人，後徙陽都。陽都先有姓葛者，時人謂之諸葛，因以為氏。" Cited in Chen and Pei 429, 52.1232 n. 1, biography of Zhuge Jin.)

The Fengsu Tongyi recorded that Zhuge Liang's ancestor was Ge Ying (葛嬰), who served under Chen Sheng, a rebel leader who led the Dazexiang uprising against the Qin dynasty. Chen Sheng later executed Ge Ying. During the early Western Han dynasty, Emperor Wen considered that Ge Ying was unjustly put to death so he enfeoffed Ge Ying's grandson as the Marquis of Zhu County to honour Ge Ying.

The earliest known ancestor of Zhuge Liang who bore the family name Zhuge was Zhuge Feng (諸葛豐), a Western Han dynasty official who served as Colonel-Director of Retainers (司隷校尉) under Emperor Yuan (r. 48–33 BC). Zhuge Liang's father, Zhuge Gui (諸葛珪), whose courtesy name was Jungong (君貢), served as an assistant official in Taishan Commandery (around present-day Tai'an, Shandong) during the late Eastern Han dynasty under Emperor Ling (r. 168–189 AD). (Note: Chen and Pei 429, 35.911: "諸葛亮字孔明，琅邪陽都人也。漢司隷校尉諸葛豐後也。父珪，字君貢，漢末為太山郡丞。")

Zhuge Liang had an elder brother, a younger brother, and two elder sisters. His elder brother was Zhuge Jin (Note: Chen and Pei 429, 52.1231–1242.) and his younger brother was Zhuge Jun. (Note: Chen and Pei 429, 35.911: "亮早孤，從父玄為袁術所署豫章太守，玄將亮及亮弟均之官。") The elder of Zhuge Liang's two sisters married Kuai Qi (蒯祺), a nephew of Kuai Yue and Kuai Liang, while the younger one married Pang Shanmin (龐山民), a cousin of Pang Tong. (Note: Xi, Xiangyang Ji: "[龐]德公子山民，亦有令名，娶諸葛孔明小姊。" Cited in Chen and Pei 429, 37.954 n. 1, continued from previous page, biography of Pang Tong.)

== Physical appearance ==
Yuan dynasty painting of Zhuge Liang

The only known historical description of Zhuge Liang's physical appearance comes from the Sanguozhi, which recorded that he was eight chi tall (approximately 1.84 metres (6 ft 0 in)) with "a magnificent appearance" that astonished his contemporaries. (Note: Chen and Pei 429, 35.911: "亮少有逸眾之才，英霸之器，身長八尺，容貌甚偉，時人異焉。")

In later sources, it is said that during the northern expedition, Zhuge Liang commanded the three armies with a white feather fan while wearing a headscarf made of kudzu hemp and riding on a plain carriage.

In Moss Roberts' translation of the 14th-century historical novel Romance of the Three Kingdoms, Zhuge Liang's appearance is described as follows:

Kongming appeared singularly tall, with a face like gleaming jade and a plaited silken band around his head. Cloaked in crane down, he had the buoyant air of a spiritual transcendent.

The original Chinese text in the novel mentions that Zhuge Liang wore a guanjin (綸巾; a type of headscarf or hat) and a hechang (鶴氅; a robe commonly worn by Daoists).

== Early life (181–207) ==
As Zhuge Liang was orphaned at a young age, he was raised by Zhuge Xuan, one of his father's cousins. He accompanied Zhuge Xuan to Yuzhang Commandery (豫章郡; around present-day Nanchang, Jiangxi) when the latter was appointed as the Commandery Administrator sometime in the mid-190s. Later, after the Han central government designated Zhu Hao as the new Administrator, Zhuge Xuan left Yuzhang Commandery and brought Zhuge Liang and Zhuge Jun to Jing Province (covering present-day Hubei and Hunan) to live with the provincial governor Liu Biao, whom he was an old friend of. (Note: Chen and Pei 429, 35.911: "會漢朝更選朱皓代玄。玄素與荊州牧劉表有舊，往依之。")

After Zhuge Xuan died, Zhuge Liang moved to Deng County (鄧縣) in Nanyang Commandery, and settled down in Longzhong (隆中), an area about 20 li west of Xiangyang, the capital of Jing Province. (Note: Xi, Han–Jin Chunqiu: "亮家于南陽之鄧縣，在襄陽城西二十里，號曰隆中。" Cited in Chen and Pei 429, 35.911 n. 2.) In Longzhong he lived the life of a peasant and spent his free time reading and travelling. He enjoyed reciting Liangfu Yin (梁父吟), (Note: Chen and Pei 429, 35.911: "玄卒，亮躬耕隴畒，好為梁父吟。") a folk song popular in the area around his ancestral home in Shandong. Zhuge Liang maintained close relations with well-known intellectuals such as Sima Hui, Pang Degong and Huang Chengyan. However, other local literati scorned him when they learnt that he often compared himself to Guan Zhong and Yue Yi. Only a few, namely Cui Zhouping (崔州平), (Note: Cui Zhouping was a member of the Cui clan of Boling and a son of Cui Lie (崔烈; died 28 June 192), a high-ranking Eastern Han dynasty minister. (Note: Cui Shipu: "州平，太尉烈子，均之弟也。" Cited in Chen and Pei 429, 35.911 n. 3. Both vol.60 of Zizhi Tongjian and the annals of Emperor Xian in Houhanshu recorded that Cui Lie was killed on the wuwu day of the 6th month of the 3rd year of the Chuping era.)) Xu Shu, Shi Tao (石韜) and Meng Jian (孟建), got along well with him and agreed that he was comparable to Guan Zhong and Yue Yi. (Note: Chen and Pei 429, 35.911: "每自比於管仲、樂毅，時人莫之許也。惟博陵崔州平、潁川徐庶元直與亮友善，謂為信然。") (Note: Yu, Weilüe: "亮在荊州，以建安初與潁川石廣元、徐元直、汝南孟公威等俱游學，三人務於精熟，而亮獨觀其大略。" Cited in Chen and Pei 429, 35.911 n. 3.)

Between the late 190s and early 200s, Zhuge Liang often studied and travelled with Xu Shu, Shi Guangyuan, and Meng Gongwei. Whenever he read, he only picked up the key points and moved on. His three friends, in contrast, focused on details and sometimes even memorised them. Throughout his time in Longzhong, he led a carefree life and took his time to do things. He often sat down with his arms around his knees, sighing to himself from time to time while in deep thought. He once told his three friends that they would become commandery administrators or provincial governors if they served in the government. When they asked him what his ambition was, he only laughed and did not give an answer. (Note: Yu, Weilüe: "每晨夜從容，常抱膝長嘯，而謂三人曰：「卿諸人仕進可至郡守刺史也。」三人問其所志，亮但笑而不言。" Cited in Chen and Pei 429, 35.911 n. 3.)

== Meeting with Liu Bei (207–208) ==
=== Recommendation from Sima Hui and Xu Shu ===
At the time, the warlord Liu Bei was living in Xinye County as a guest of Liu Biao, the governor of Jing Province. During this time, he met the hermit Sima Hui and consulted him on the affairs of their time. Sima Hui said, "What do Confucian academics and common scholars know about current affairs? Only outstanding talents have the best understanding of current affairs. In this region, there are two of such talents: Sleeping Dragon and Young Phoenix." When Liu Bei asked him who "Sleeping Dragon" and "Young Phoenix" were, Sima Hui replied, "Zhuge Kongming and Pang Shiyuan." (Note: Xi, Xiangyang Ji: "劉備訪世事於司馬德操。德操曰：「儒生俗士，豈識時務？識時務者在乎俊傑。此間自有伏龍、鳳雛。」備問為誰，曰：「諸葛孔明、龐士元也。」" Cited in Chen and Pei 429, 35.913 n. 1.) Xu Shu, whom Liu Bei regarded highly, also recommended Zhuge Liang by saying, "Zhuge Kongming is the Sleeping Dragon. General, don't you want to meet him?" (Note: Chen and Pei 429, 35.912: "時先主屯新野。徐庶見先主，先主器之，謂先主曰：「諸葛孔明者，卧龍也，將軍豈願見之乎？」") When Liu Bei asked Xu Shu if he could bring Zhuge Liang to meet him, Xu Shu advised him to personally visit Zhuge Liang instead of asking Zhuge Liang to come to him. (Note: Chen and Pei 429, 35.912: "先主曰：「君與俱來。」庶曰：「此人可就見，不可屈致也。將軍宜枉駕顧之。」")

=== Liu Bei's three visits ===
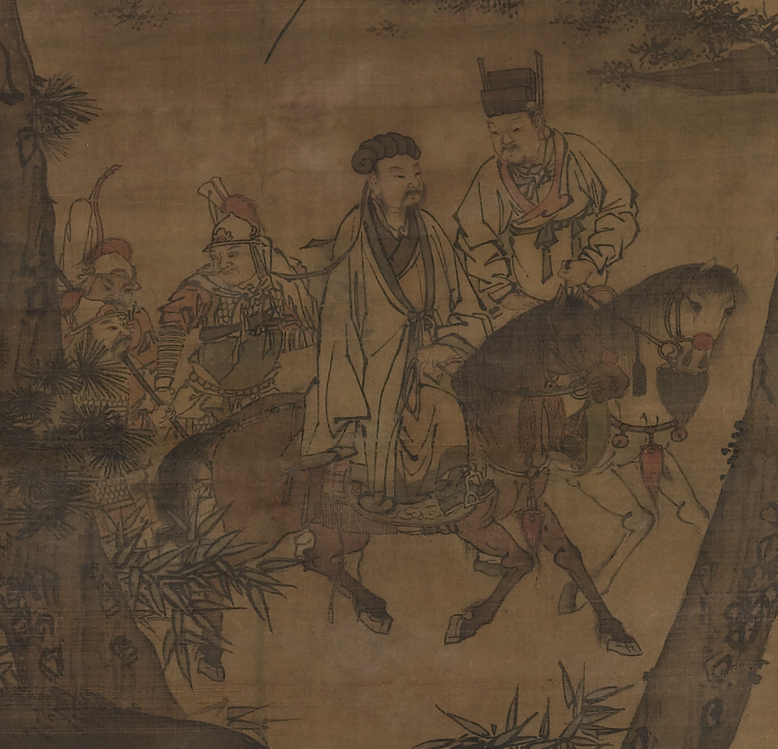
The painting Kongming Leaving the Mountains (detail, Ming dynasty) depicts Zhuge Liang (left, on a horse) leaving his rustic retreat to enter into the service of Liu Bei (right, on a horse).

The Sanguozhi recorded in just one sentence that Liu Bei visited Zhuge Liang three (Note: Although the Sanguozhi recorded that Liu Bei visited Zhuge Liang three times, the "three times" could also be interpreted in a metaphorical way to mean "multiple times", à la the Chinese saying 一而再，再而三 used to describe something be done repeatedly.) times and met him. (Note: Chen and Pei 429, 35.912: "由是先主遂詣亮，凡三往，乃見。") The Zizhi Tongjian recorded that the meeting(s) took place in 207. Chen Shou also mentions the three visits in his biographical sketch of Zhuge Liang appended to the memoirs Chen Shou compiled. (Note: Chen and Pei 429, 35.930)

During their private meeting, Liu Bei sought Zhuge Liang's advice on how to compete with the powerful warlords and revive the declining Han dynasty. (Note: Chen and Pei 429, 35.912: "因屏人曰：「漢室傾頹， ...君謂計將安出？」") In response, Zhuge Liang presented his Longzhong Plan, which envisaged a tripartite division of China between the domains of Liu Bei, Cao Cao and Sun Quan. According to the plan, Liu Bei should seize control of Jing Province (covering present-day Hubei and Hunan) and Yi Province (covering present-day Sichuan and Chongqing) from their respective governors, Liu Biao and Liu Zhang, and establish a solid foothold in southern and western China. Liu Bei would then form an alliance with Sun Quan, who ruled eastern China, and wage war against Cao Cao, who controlled northern China and the political centre of the Han dynasty in central China. (Note: Chen and Pei 429, 35.912: "亮荅曰：「自董卓已來，豪傑並起，跨州連郡者不可勝數。 ...誠如是，則霸業可成，漢室可興矣。」")

After the meeting, Liu Bei became very close to Zhuge Liang and spent much time with him – much to Guan Yu and Zhang Fei's chagrin. Liu Bei explained to them, "Now that I have Kongming, I am like a fish that has found water. I hope you'll stop making unpleasant remarks." Guan Yu and Zhang Fei then stopped complaining. (Note: Chen and Pei 429, 35.913: "於是與亮情好日密。關羽、張飛等不恱，先主解之曰：「孤之有孔明，猶魚之有水也。願諸君勿復言。」羽、飛乃止。")

== Formation of the Sun–Liu alliance (208–209) ==
=== Liu's evacuation to Xiakou ===
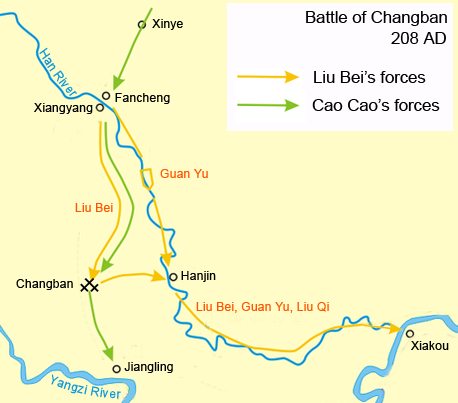
Map of Changban battle

In the autumn of 208, shortly before Liu Biao's death, Cao Cao led his forces on a southern campaign to conquer Jing Province. When Cao Cao's forces reached Jing Province's capital Xiangyang, Liu Biao's younger son Liu Cong, who had succeeded his father as the Governor of Jing Province, surrendered to Cao Cao. Upon receiving news of Liu Cong's surrender, Liu Bei immediately evacuated his base in Fancheng (樊城; present-day Fancheng District, Xiangyang, Hubei) and led thousands of his followers, both military and civilian, on a journey to Xiakou (夏口; in present-day Wuhan, Hubei) to join Liu Biao's elder son Liu Qi. Along the way, Cao Cao's forces caught up with them and defeated them at the Battle of Changban. Along with only a handful of close followers, Liu Bei managed to escape, and upon reaching Xiakou sent Zhuge Liang as his representative to meet Sun Quan and discuss an alliance against Cao Cao. (Note: Chen and Pei 429, 35.914–915: "會黃祖死，得出，遂為江夏太守。俄而表卒，琮聞曹公來征，遣使請降。先主在樊聞之，率其衆南行，亮與徐庶並從，為曹公所追破， ...先主至于夏口，亮曰：「事急矣，請奉命求救於孫將軍。」")

=== Meeting with Sun Quan ===
Around the time, Sun Quan was in Chaisang (柴桑; southwest of present-day Jiujiang, Jiangxi) and had been closely observing the developments in Jing Province. (Note: Chen and Pei 429, 35.915: "時權擁軍在柴桑，觀望成敗。") When Zhuge Liang met Sun Quan, he said:

The land is in chaos. General, you raised an army and occupied Jiangdong, while Liu Bei is gathering forces at the south of the Han River. Both of you are preparing to compete with Cao Cao for control over China. As of now, Cao Cao has eliminated internal threats, more or less pacified his lands, and led his forces south to occupy Jing Province. The Empire trembles at his might. A hero without opportunity to display his prowess, Liu Bei has retreated here. I hope that you, General, will carefully assess your strengths and decide your next course of action. If you decide to lead your forces from the Wu and Yue regions to resist the Central States, you should quickly break ties [with Cao Cao]. If you can't resist him, why don't you put down your weapons, remove your armour, position yourself as subordinate, and serve him? General, although by appearances you seem ready to pledge allegiance to Cao Cao, in your heart you still harbour thoughts of freedom. If you can't be decisive at such a crucial moment, it will be no time until you meet with disaster! (Note: Chen and Pei 429, 35.915: "亮說權曰：「海內大亂，將軍起兵據有江東，劉豫州亦收衆漢南，與曹操並爭天下。今操芟夷大難，略已平矣，遂破荊州，威震四海。英雄無所用武，故豫州遁逃至此。將軍量力而處之：若能以吳、越之衆與中國抗衡，不如早與之絕；若不能當，何不案兵束甲，北面而事之！今將軍外託服從之名，而內懷猶豫之計，事急而不斷，禍至無日矣！」")

When Sun Quan asked him why Liu Bei did not surrender to Cao Cao, (Note: Chen and Pei 429, 35.915: "權曰：「苟如君言，劉豫州何不遂事之乎？」") Zhuge Liang replied:

Tian Heng was nothing more than a mere warrior from Qi, yet he remained faithful and refused to surrender. Shouldn't we expect more from Liu Bei, scion of the royal house of Han? His heroism and talents are renowned throughout the world. Gentlemen and commoners alike honour and admire him. Like the rivers returning to the sea; like the upheavals in the affairs of our time, this is Heaven's doing. How could he turn his back on that and serve Cao Cao? (Note: Chen and Pei 429, 35.915: "亮曰：「田橫，齊之壯士耳，猶守義不辱，况劉豫州王室之胄，英才蓋世，衆士慕仰，若水之歸海，若事之不濟，此乃天也，安能復為之下乎！」")

An enraged Sun Quan then said that he would not allow anyone but himself to rule the territories and people in Wu. When he asked Zhuge Liang how Liu Bei could expect to resist Cao Cao, given his recent defeat at Changban, (Note: Chen and Pei 429, 35.915: "權勃然曰：「吾不能舉全吳之地，十萬之衆，受制於人。吾計決矣！非劉豫州莫可以當曹操者，然豫州新敗之後，安能抗此難乎？」") Zhuge Liang replied:

Liu Bei's forces may have suffered a defeat at Changban, but now many of his men who were scattered during the battle are returning to him, along with 10,000 elite marine troops under Guan Yu, combining forces with Liu Qi's army of at least 10,000 from Jiangxia. Cao Cao and his forces have come a great distance and are exhausted. I have heard that his light cavalry travelled over 300 li in twenty-four hours in pursuit of Liu Bei. This fits the saying: "even a powerful arrow at the end of its flight cannot penetrate a piece of Lu silk cloth." Such a battle should be avoided according to military strategy, which says that it "will definitely result in defeat for the commander". The northerners are also not familiar with naval warfare. Although the people in Jing Province have surrendered to Cao Cao, they were forced to submit, and are not truly loyal to him. Now, General, if you are able to send your fierce officers to lead your vast hosts to align goals and combine might with Liu Bei, the defeat of Cao Cao's army is certain. Once defeated, Cao Cao will be forced to return north, and Jing Province and Wu will be sturdy as the legs of a bronze cauldron. The trigger for victory or defeat is your decision today. (Note: Chen and Pei 429, 35.915: "亮曰：「豫州軍雖敗於長阪，今戰士還者及關羽水軍精甲萬人，劉琦合江夏戰士亦不下萬人。曹操之衆遠來疲弊，聞追豫州，輕騎一日一夜行三百餘里，此所謂『彊弩之末，勢不能穿魯縞』者也。故兵法忌之，曰『必蹶上將軍』。且北方之人，不習水戰；又荊州之民附操者，偪兵勢耳，非心服也。今將軍誠能命猛將統兵數萬，與豫州協規同力，破操軍必矣。操軍破，必北還，如此則荊、吳之勢彊，鼎足之形成矣。成敗之機，在於今日。」")

=== Zhang Zhao's recommendation ===
Yuan Zhun's Yuanzi recorded that when Zhuge Liang was in Chaisang, Zhang Zhao recommended he switch allegiance from Liu Bei to Sun Quan, but Zhuge Liang refused. When Zhang Zhao asked him why, Zhuge Liang said, "[Sun Quan] is a good leader of men. However, from what I observe about his character, he will make good use of my abilities but not to their fullest extent. That is why I don't want to serve under him." (Note: Yuan, Yuanzi: "張子布薦亮於孫權，亮不肯留。人問其故，曰：「孫將軍可謂人主，然觀其度，能賢亮而不能盡亮，吾是以不留。」" Cited in Chen and Pei 429, 35.916 n. 1.)

Pei Songzhi noted how differently this episode portrayed Zhuge Liang's special and sui generis relationship with Liu Bei, and pointed out that his loyalty to Liu Bei was so firm that nothing would make him switch allegiance to Sun Quan – not even if Sun Quan could make full use of his abilities. Pei Songzhi then cited a similar example of how Guan Yu, during his brief service under Cao Cao, maintained unwavering loyalty to Liu Bei even though Cao Cao treated him very generously. (Note: Pei Songzhi, in Chen and Pei 429, 35.916 n. 1: "臣松之以為袁孝尼著文立論，甚重諸葛之為人，至如此言則失之殊遠。觀亮君臣相遇，可謂希世一時，終始以分，誰能間之？寧有中違斷金，甫懷擇主，設使權盡其量，便當翻然去就乎？葛生行己，豈其然哉！關羽為曹公所獲，遇之甚厚，可謂能盡其用矣，猶義不背本，曾謂孔明之不若雲長乎！")

=== Battle of Red Cliffs ===
Battle of Red Cliffs, and Cao Cao's retreat. The battlefield location is marked at the site near Chibi City; see Location of Red Cliffs.

After initial advisement against Zhuge Liang's plan for a Sun–Liu alliance, further consultation with his generals Lu Su and Zhou Yu convinced Sun Quan to move forward with it. He ordered Zhou Yu, Cheng Pu, Lu Su and others to lead 30,000 troops to join Liu Bei in resisting Cao Cao's invasion. (Note: Chen and Pei 429, 35.915: "權大恱，即遣周瑜、程普、魯肅等水軍三萬，隨亮詣先主，幷力拒曹公。") In the winter of 208, the allied forces of Liu Bei and Sun Quan scored a decisive victory over Cao Cao's forces at the Battle of Red Cliffs. Cao Cao retreated to Ye (in present-day Handan, Hebei) after his defeat. (Note: Chen and Pei 429, 35.915: "曹公敗於赤壁，引軍歸鄴。")

== Service in southern Jing Province (209–211) ==
Following the Battle of Red Cliffs, Liu Bei nominated Liu Qi as the Inspector of Jing Province and sent his forces to conquer the four commanderies in southern Jing Province: Wuling (武陵; near Changde, Hunan), Changsha, Guiyang (桂陽; near Chenzhou, Hunan) and Lingling (零陵; near Yongzhou, Hunan). The administrators of the four commanderies surrendered to him. After Liu Qi died in 209, acting on Lu Su's advice, Sun Quan agreed to "lend" the territories in Jing Province to Liu Bei and nominate him to succeed Liu Qi as the Governor of Jing Province.

After assuming governorship of southern Jing Province in 209, Liu Bei appointed Zhuge Liang as Military Adviser General of the Household (軍師中郎將) and put him in charge of collecting tax revenue from Lingling, Guiyang and Changsha commanderies for his military forces. (Note: Chen and Pei 429, 35.915–916: "先主遂收江南，以亮為軍師中郎將，使督零陵、桂陽、長沙三郡，調其賦稅，以充軍實。") During this time, Zhuge Liang was stationed in Linzheng County (臨烝縣; present-day Hengyang, Hunan) in Changsha Commandery. (Note: Lingling Xianxian Zhuan: "亮時住臨烝。" Cited in Chen and Pei 429, 35.916 n. 2.)

== Conquest of Yi Province (211–214) ==
In 211 Liu Zhang, the Governor of Yi Province (covering present-day Sichuan and Chongqing), invited Liu Bei to lead troops into Yi Province to assist him in countering his rival, Zhang Lu, in Hanzhong Commandery. While Liu Bei was away in Jing Province, Zhuge Liang remained behind with Guan Yu and others to guard Liu Bei's territories in Jing Province. (Note: Chen and Pei 429, 35.916: "建安十六年，益州牧劉璋遣法正迎先主，使擊張魯。亮與關羽鎮荊州。")

When Liu Bei decided to take over Liu Zhang's lands in 212, Zhuge Liang, along with Zhang Fei, Zhao Yun and others, led troops from Jing Province into Yi Province to reinforce Liu Bei. They conquered many counties and commanderies along the way and eventually joined Liu Bei in surrounding Chengdu, the capital of Yi Province. (Note: Chen and Pei 429, 35.916: "先主自葭萌還攻璋，亮與張飛、趙雲等率衆泝江，分定郡縣，與先主共圍成都。")

After Liu Zhang surrendered and relinquished control over Yi Province to Liu Bei in 214, Zhuge Liang was appointed as Military Adviser General (軍師將軍) and made a staff member of the office of the General of the Left (左將軍), the nominal appointment Liu Bei held at the time. (Note: Liu Bei was appointed as General of the Left (左將軍) in 199 by the Han central government after he assisted Cao Cao in defeating Lü Bu at the Battle of Xiapi. (Note: Chen and Pei 429, 32.874: "曹公自出東征，助先主圍布於下邳，生禽[呂]布。先主復得妻子，從曹公還許。表先主為左將軍。")) Whenever Liu Bei went on military campaigns, Zhuge Liang remained behind to guard Chengdu and ensured that the city was well-stocked with supplies and well-defended. (Note: Chen and Pei 429, 35.916: "成都平，以亮為軍師將軍，署左將軍府事。先主外出，亮常鎮守成都，足食足兵。")

== Liu's coronation (214–223) ==
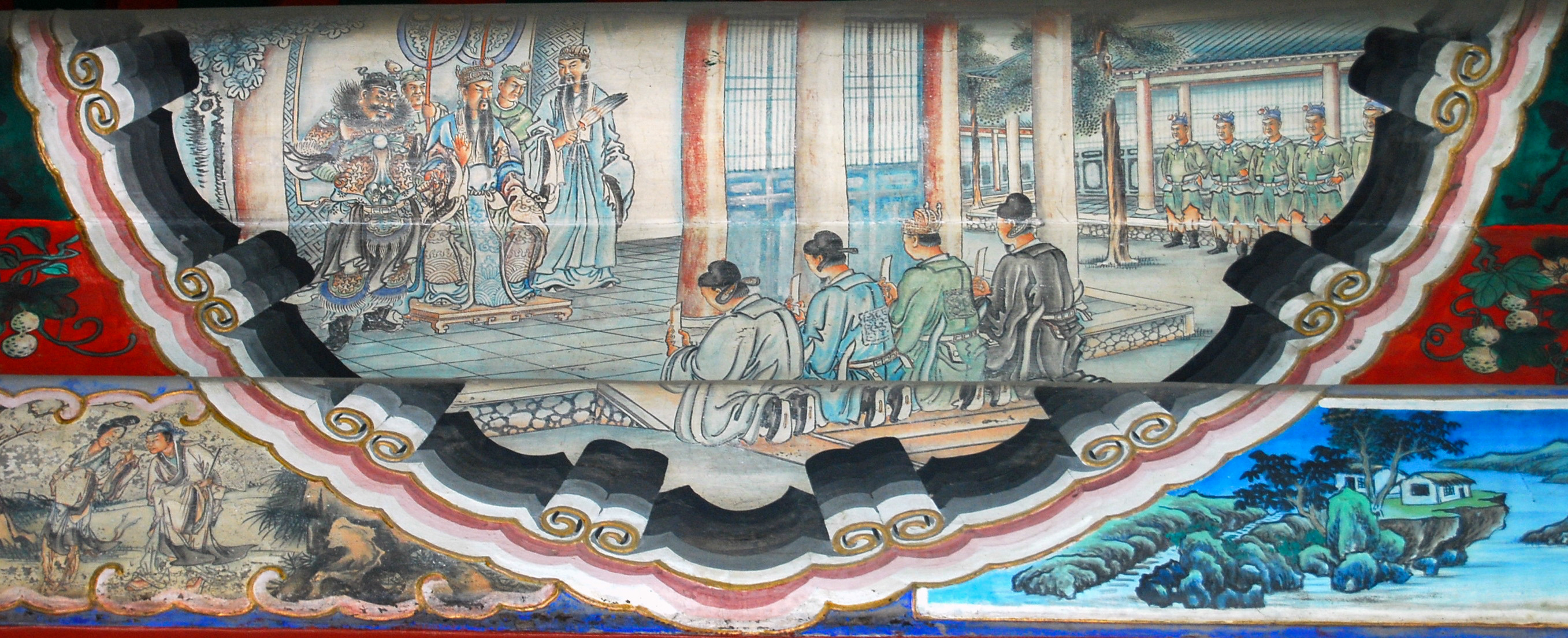
Liu Bei declares himself king, portrait at the Long Corridor of the Summer Palace, Beijing.

In late 220, some months after Cao Cao's death, his son and successor Cao Pi usurped the throne from Emperor Xian, ended the Eastern Han dynasty, and established the state of Wei with himself as the new emperor. This event marks the beginning of the Three Kingdoms period in China. In the following year, Liu Bei's followers urged him to declare himself emperor to challenge Cao Pi's legitimacy, but Liu Bei refused. (Note: Chen and Pei 429, 35.916: "二十六年，羣下勸先主稱尊號，先主未許。")

Zhuge said:

In the past, when Wu Han, Geng Yan and others first urged Emperor Guangwu to assume the imperial throne, Emperor Guangwu declined a total of four times. Geng Chun then told him: "The world's valiant heroes are gasping for air, hoping there is anything worth hoping for. If you don't heed everyone's advice, your associates will go back to seeking a sovereign, and no one will want to follow you anymore." Emperor Guangwu felt Geng Chun's words were profound and correct, so he accepted the throne. Now the Cao family have usurped the Han, and China has no sovereign. Your Highness, (Note: Liu Bei declared himself "King of Hanzhong" (漢中王) in 219 after his victory in the Hanzhong Campaign.) from the great royal clan of Liu, you have risen to overcome the times. The appropriate action is for you to take position as emperor. Your associates who have followed your Highness at length through great effort and hardship because they too hoped for some small success, are just like the ones Geng Chun spoke of. (Note: Chen and Pei 429, 35.916: "亮說曰：「昔吳漢、耿弇等初勸世祖即帝位，世祖辭讓，前後數四，耿純進言曰：『天下英雄喁喁，冀有所望。如不從議者，士大夫各歸求主，無為從公也。』世祖感純言深至，遂然諾之。今曹氏篡漢，天下無主，大王劉氏苗族，紹世而起，今即帝位，乃其宜也。士大夫隨大王久勤苦者，亦欲望尺寸之功如純言耳。」")

In 221 Liu Bei declared himself emperor and established the state of Shu Han. He appointed Zhuge Liang as his Imperial Chancellor (丞相) as follows:

From the misfortune of our insolvent family, we have been lofted to an office of great authority. Cautiously we approach this great enterprise, never daring to assume ease or tranquility, thinking foremost of the needs of the people, yet we fear ourselves unable to bring them peace. Alas! Imperial Chancellor Zhuge Liang will understand our intents, tirelessly redress our deficiencies, and assist in spreading our benevolent light, that it may illuminate all of China. Sir, you are thus enjoined to do so! (Note: Chen and Pei 429, 35.916–917: "先主於是即帝位，策亮為丞相曰：「朕遭家不造，奉承大統，兢兢業業，不敢康寧，思盡百姓，懼未能綏。於戲！丞相亮其悉朕意，無怠輔朕之闕，助宣重光，以照明天下，君其勖哉！」")

Zhuge Liang also held the additional appointment of Lu Shangshu Shi (錄尚書事), the Supervisor of the Imperial Secretariat, and had full acting imperial authority. After Zhang Fei's death in mid-221, Zhuge Liang took on an additional appointment as Colonel-Director of Retainers (司隷校尉), which Zhang Fei previously held. (Note: Chen and Pei 429, 35.917: "亮以丞相錄尚書事，假節。張飛卒後，領司隷校尉。")

== Appointment as regent (223) ==
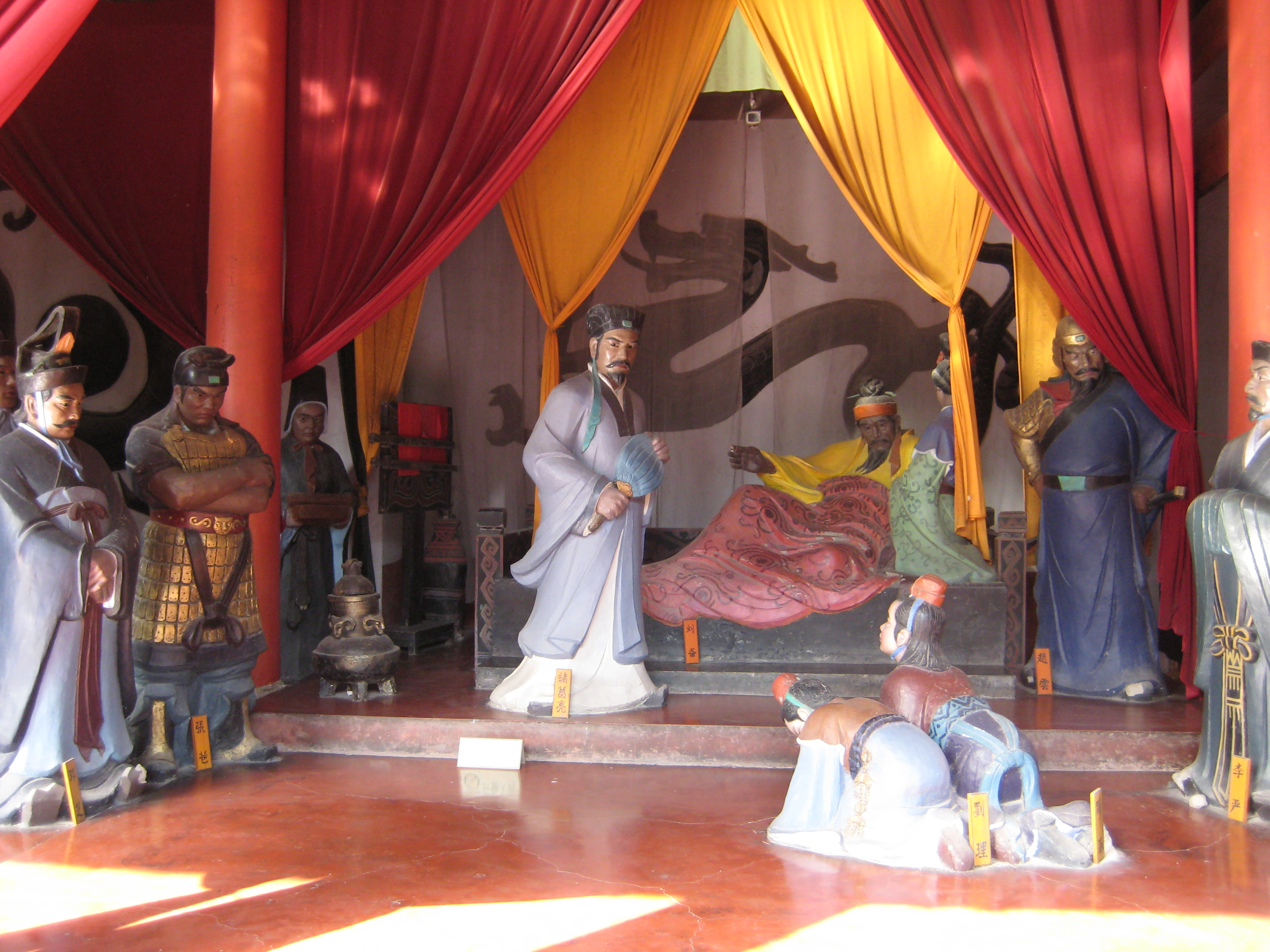
The sculptures depicting Liu Bei entrusting his sons to Zhuge Liang in Baidicheng

Following his defeat at the Battle of Xiaoting in 222, Liu Bei retreated to Yong'an County (永安縣; present-day Fengjie County, Chongqing) and became critically ill in early 223. (Note: Chen and Pei 429, 35.918: "章武三年春，先主於永安病篤，召亮於成都，屬以後事。") He summoned Zhuge from Chengdu, and told him: "Sir, you're ten times more talented than Cao Pi. You'll definitely bring peace to the Empire and accomplish our great mission. If my heir can be assisted, then assist him; if he turns out to be incompetent, then you may make your own decision." (Note: Chen and Pei 429, 35.918: "謂亮曰：「君才十倍曹丕，必能安國，終定大事。若嗣子可輔，輔之；如其不才，君可自取。」") (Note: In his annotations to Zizhi Tongjian, Hu Sanxing wrote that in the history of sovereigns appointing regents when they are near death, none were as understanding or perceptive as Liu Bei.)

With tears in his eyes, Zhuge replied: "I'll do my utmost and serve with unwavering loyalty until death!" (Note: Chen and Pei 429, 35.918: "亮涕泣曰：「臣敢竭股肱之力，效忠貞之節，繼之以死！」") Liu Bei then instructed Liu Shan, his son and heir apparent, as follows: "When you work together with the Imperial Chancellor, you must treat him like your father." (Note: Chen and Pei 429, 35.918: "先主又為詔勑後主曰：「汝與丞相從事，事之如父。」") Liu Bei then named Zhuge Liang as regent for Liu Shan, and Li Yan as deputy regent. He died on 10 June 223 in Yong'an County. (Note: Chen and Pei 429, 32.891: "先主病篤，託孤於丞相亮，尚書令李嚴為副。[章武三年]夏四月癸巳，先主殂于永安宮，時年六十三。")

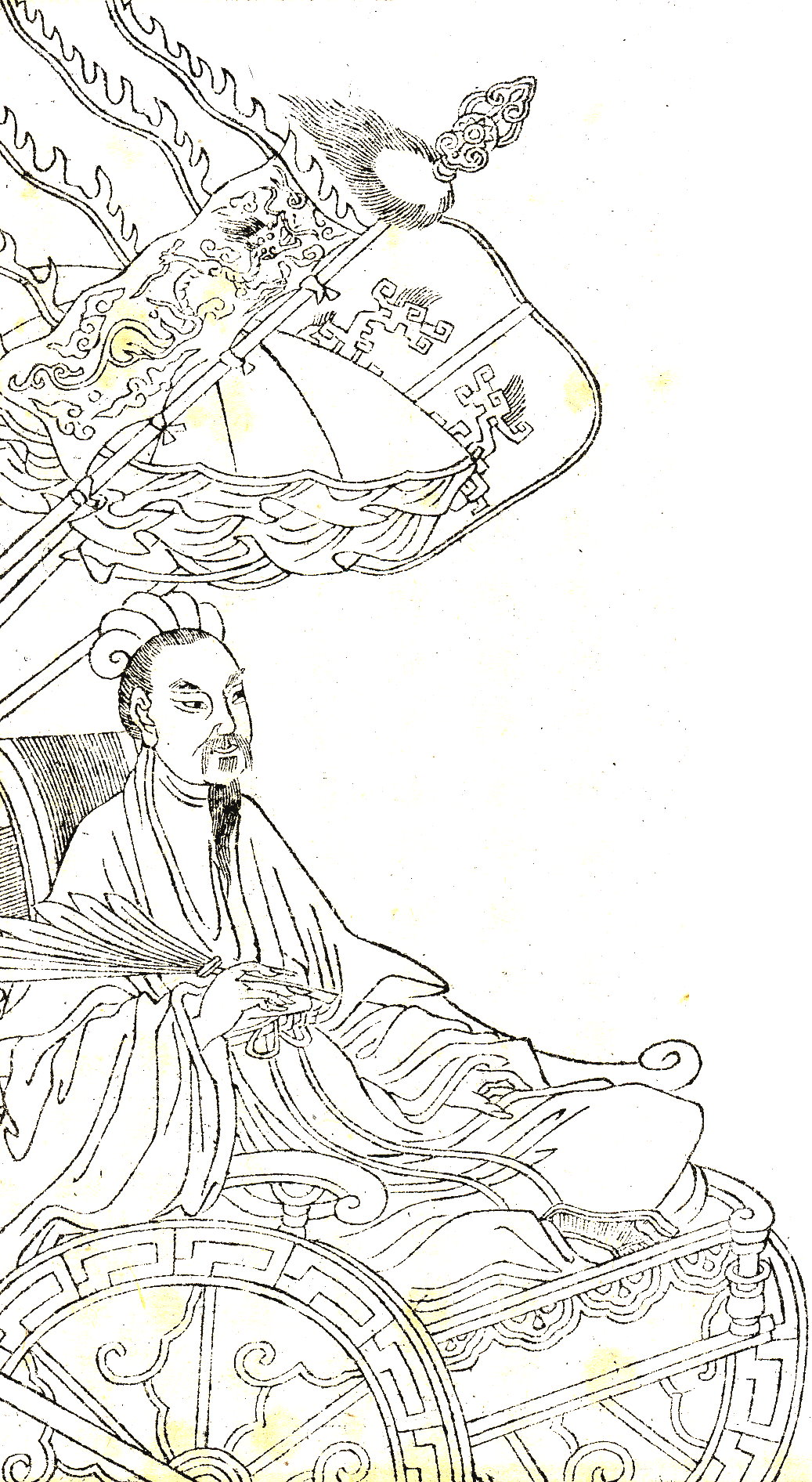
A 20th century depiction of Zhuge Liang.

The last command of Liu Bei to Zhuge Liang, translated literally above as "you may make your own decision" (君可自取), is ambiguous. Chen Shou commented that Liu Bei wholeheartly trusted Zhuge Liang and was permitting him to assume leadership. Yi Zhongtian in his "Analysis of the Three Kingdoms" presented several interpretations of Liu Bei's message. Some argued that Liu Bei said that only to test Zhuge Liang's loyalty as his brother, Zhuge Jin, was working for Eastern Wu. Others commented that the ambiguous phrase did not mean Zhuge Liang was allowed take the throne for himself, but he was permitted to, when the situation demanded, replace Liu Shan with other of Liu Bei's living sons such as Liu Yong and Liu Li.

Following Liu Bei's death, Liu Shan ascended the throne and succeeded his father as the emperor of Shu. After his coronation, Liu Shan enfeoffed Zhuge Liang as the Marquis of Wu District (武鄉侯) and created a personal staff to assist him. Later, Zhuge Liang assumed an additional appointment as Governor of Yi Province (益州牧). He personally oversaw all state affairs and made the final call on all policy decisions. (Note: Chen and Pei 429, 35.918: "建興元年，封亮武鄉侯，開府治事。頃之，又領益州牧。政事無巨細，咸決於亮。")

When rebellions broke out in the Nanzhong region of southern Shu, Zhuge Liang did not immediately take military action to suppress the rebellions because he thought it was not appropriate to do so in light of the recent death of Liu Bei. In late 223, he sent Deng Zhi as Shu's ambassador to Eastern Wu to make peace and rebuild the Wu–Shu alliance against Cao Wei. (Note: Chen and Pei 429, 35.918: "南中諸郡，並皆叛亂，亮以新遭大喪，故未便加兵，且遣使聘吳，因結和親，遂為與國。")

During his regency, Zhuge Liang set Shu's objective as the restoration of the Han dynasty, continuing Liu Bei's objective. He appointed large numbers of local elites as low level officials, improving relations between Liu Bei's conquest bureaucracy, local elites, and the people of Shu.

== Refusing to submit to Wei (223–225) ==
Shortly after he became regent, he received letters from various Wei officials – including Hua Xin, Wang Lang, Chen Qun, Xu Zhi (許芝) and Zhuge Zhang (諸葛璋) – asking him to surrender to Wei and make Shu a vassal state under Wei. (Note: Chen Shou, Zhuge Liang ji: "是歲，魏司徒華歆、司空王朗、尚書令陳羣、太史令許芝、謁者僕射諸葛璋各有書與亮，陳天命人事，欲使舉國稱藩。" Cited in Chen and Pei 429, 35.918 n. 2.) Instead of responding to any of the letters, he wrote a memo, called Zheng Yi (正議; "Exhortation to Correct Action"), as follows:

In the past, Xiang Yu did not act out of virtue, so even though he dominated Huaxia and had the might to be emperor, he died and was boiled into soup. His downfall has served as a cautionary tale for generations. Wei did not learn from this example and has followed in his footsteps. Even if they have the fortune to avoid it personally, doom will befall their sons and grandsons. Many of those who asked me to surrender to Wei are already in their old age, pushing papers in service of a pretender.

They are like Chen Chong and Sun Song, fawning on Wang Mang, even supporting him in usurping the throne, yet seeking to avoid their punishment. When Emperor Guangwu was hacking at their roots, his few thousand weakened footsoldiers were roused to tear apart Wang Mang's expeditionary force of 400,000 outside of Kunyang. When holding the Way and punishing the wicked, numbers are irrelevant.

So it was with Cao Cao, for all his craftiness and might. He raised hundreds of thousands of troops to save Zhang He at Yanping, whose potence was shriveled and choices regrettable. Barely managing to escape himself, Cao Cao brought shame to his doughty troops, and forfeited the land of Hanzhong to Liu Bei. Only then did Cao Cao realise that the Divine Vessel of imperial authority is not something to be taken at one's pleasure. Before he could finish the return journey, his poisonous intent killed him from inside. Cao Pi excels at evil, which he demonstrated by usurping the throne.

Suppose those asking my surrender were as eloquent and persuasive as Su Qin and Zhang Yi, even as far as possessing the glibness of Huan Dou who could fool Heaven itself. If they wish to slander Emperor Tang and pick apart Yu and Hou Ji, they'll just be squandering their abilities dribbling pointless ink from overworked brushes. This is something no true man or Confucian gentleman would do.

The Military Commandments say: "With 10,000 men willing to die, you can conquer the world." If in the past the Yellow Emperor – his whole forces totalling 50,000 or so – controlled every region and stabilised the whole world, how much more so by comparison could ten times his number do, holding the true Way, standing over these criminals? (Note: Chen Shou, Zhuge Liang ji: "亮遂不報書，作正議曰：「昔在項羽，起不由德，雖處華夏，秉帝者之勢，卒就湯鑊，為後永戒。魏不審鑒，今次之矣；免身為幸，戒在子孫。而二三子各以耆艾之齒，承偽指而進書，有若崇、竦稱莽之功，亦將偪于元禍苟免者邪！昔世祖之創迹舊基，奮羸卒數千，摧莽彊旅四十餘萬於昆陽之郊。夫據道討淫，不在衆寡。及至孟德，以其譎勝之力，舉數十萬之師，救張郃於陽平，勢窮慮悔，僅能自脫，辱其鋒銳之衆，遂喪漢中之地，深知神器不可妄獲，旋還未至，感毒而死。子桓淫逸，繼之以篡。縱使二三子多逞蘇、張詭靡之說，奉進驩兜滔天之辭，欲以誣毀唐帝，諷解禹、稷，所謂徒喪文藻煩勞翰墨者矣。夫大人君子之所不為也。又軍誡曰：『萬人必死，橫行天下。』昔軒轅氏整卒數萬，制四方，定海內，況以數十萬之衆，據正道而臨有罪，可得干擬者哉！」" Cited in Chen and Pei 429, 35.918–919 n. 2.)

== Southern Campaign (225–227) ==
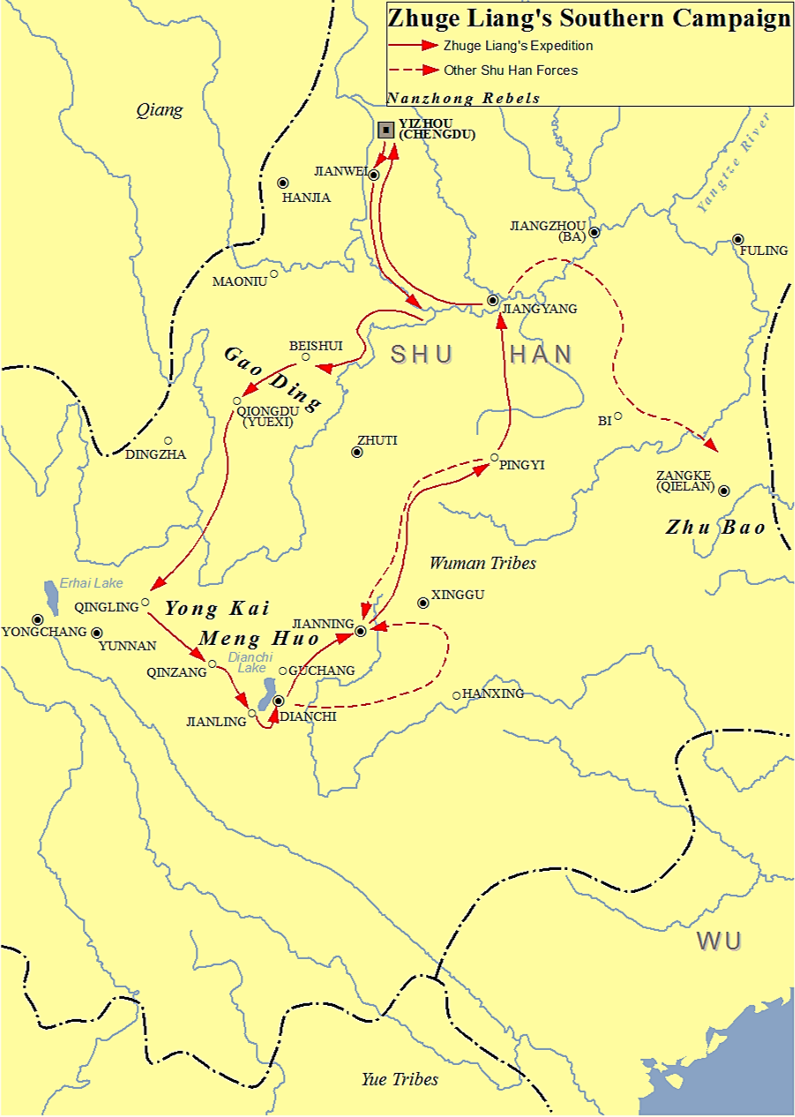
Zhuge Liang's Southern Campaign

Zhuge Liang wanted to personally lead the Shu forces on a southern campaign to the Nanzhong region to suppress the rebellions which erupted in 223, as well as to pacify and gain the allegiance of the Nanman tribes living there. Wang Lian, Zhuge Liang's chief clerk, strongly objected to his boss's participation in the campaign because it was too dangerous. He argued that given Zhuge Liang's important status in Shu, he should not undertake such a risky venture. However, Zhuge Liang insisted on personally leading the campaign as he was worried that none of the Shu generals was competent enough to deal with the rebels on his own. (Note: Chen and Pei 429, 41.1009–1010, biography of Wang Lian: "時南方諸郡不賔，諸葛亮將自征之，連諫以為「此不毛之地，疫癘之鄉，不宜以一國之望，冒險而行」。亮慮諸將才不及己，意欲必往，而連言輒懇至，故停留者久之。") Ma Su, an adviser under Zhuge Liang, suggested that rather than conventional warfare, they focus on psychological warfare, winning the hearts of the people in Nanzhong, so as to prevent rebellions from breaking out again. Zhuge Liang readily accepted Ma Su's advice.

In the spring of 225, Zhuge Liang led the Shu forces on the southern campaign. They defeated the rebel leaders Yong Kai (雍闓), Gao Ding (高定) and Zhu Bao (朱褒), and pacified the three commanderies of Jianning (建寧; around Qujing, Yunnan), Yuexi/Yuesui (越巂; around Xichang, Sichuan) and Zangke (牂柯; around Guiyang or Fuquan, Guizhou). After that, they turned their attention to Meng Huo, a local leader who supported the rebels. Zhuge Liang knew that Meng Huo was a popular and respected figure in Nanzhong among the Nanman and local Han Chinese, so he decided to let Meng Huo live. After capturing Meng Huo in battle, Zhuge Liang showed him around the Shu camp and asked him what he thought. Meng Huo replied, "Before this, I knew nothing about your army, which was why I lost. Now that you have shown me around your camp, I know the conditions of your army and will be able to win easily." Zhuge Liang laughed, released him and allowed him to return for another battle. The same cycle repeated for a total of seven times. On the seventh time, Meng Huo surrendered and told Zhuge Liang, "My lord, against Heaven's might the people of the south will never again rebel." Zhuge Liang then led his forces towards Dian Lake in triumph. (Note: Xi, Han–Jin Chunqiu: "亮至南中，所在戰捷。聞孟獲者，為夷、漢所服，募生致之。旣得，使觀於營陣之間，曰：「此軍何如？」獲對曰：「向者不知虛實，故敗。今蒙賜觀看營陣，若祇如此，即定易勝耳。」亮笑，縱使更戰，七縱七禽，而亮猶遣獲。獲止不去，曰：「公，天威也，南人不復反矣。」遂至滇池。" Cited in Chen and Pei 429, 35.921 n. 2.) The Nanzhong region was basically pacified by the autumn of 225. (Note: Chen and Pei 429, 35.919: "[建興]三年春，亮率衆南征，其秋悉平。")

Before pulling out all Shu soldiers from the Nanzhong region, Zhuge Liang told Meng Huo and other local leaders that all he required from them was to pay tribute to the Shu government, in the form of gold, silver, oxen, warhorses, etc. He also appointed locals such as Li Hui and Lü Kai to serve as the new commandery administrators, while the local leaders and tribal chiefs were allowed to continue governing their respective peoples and tribes. After the southern campaign, the Shu state became more prosperous as the Nanzhong region became a steady source of funding and supplies for the Shu military. Under Zhuge Liang's direction, the Shu military also started training soldiers, stockpiling weapons and resources, etc., in preparation for an upcoming campaign against their rival Wei. (Note: Chen and Pei 429, 35.919: "軍資所出，國以富饒，乃治戎講武，以俟大舉。")

== Northern Expeditions (227–234) ==
=== Submitting the Chu Shi Biao ===
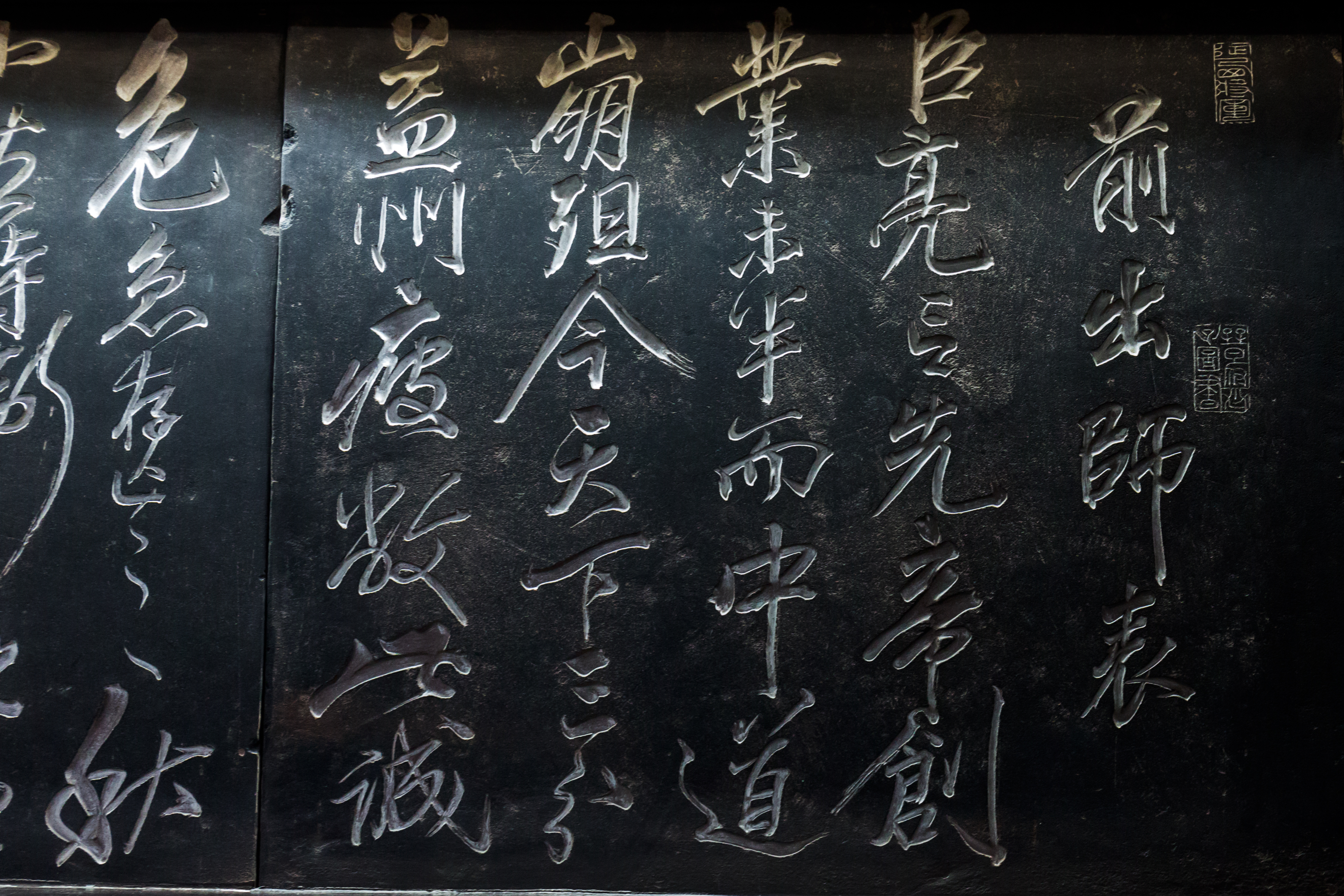
The Former Chu Shi Biao engraved in the Temple of Marquis Wu, Chengdu, Sichuan

In 227 Zhuge Liang ordered troops from throughout Shu to mobilise and assemble in Hanzhong Commandery in preparation for a large-scale military campaign against Cao Wei. Before leaving, he wrote a memorial, called Chu Shi Biao ("memorial on the case to go to war"), and submitted it to the Liu Shan. Among other things, the memorial contained Zhuge Liang's reasons for the campaign against Wei and his personal advice to Liu Shan on governance issues. (Note: Chen and Pei 429, 35.919–920: "[建興]五年，率諸軍北駐漢中，臨發，上疏曰：...") After Liu Shan approved, Zhuge Liang ordered the Shu forces to garrison at Mianyang (沔陽; present-day Mian County, Shaanxi). (Note: Chen and Pei 429, 35.920: "遂行，屯于沔陽。")

=== Tianshui revolts and Battle of Jieting ===
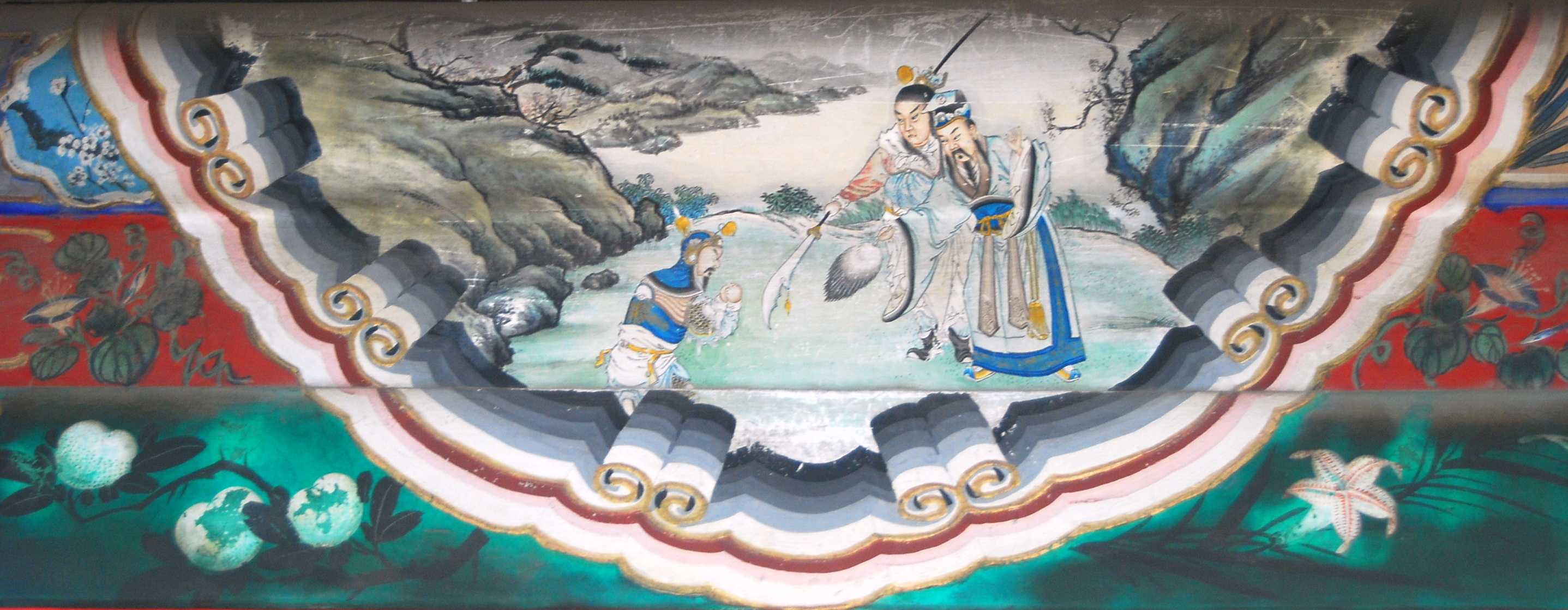
Jiang Wei surrenders to Zhuge Liang. Portrait in the Long Corridor of the Summer Palace, Beijing

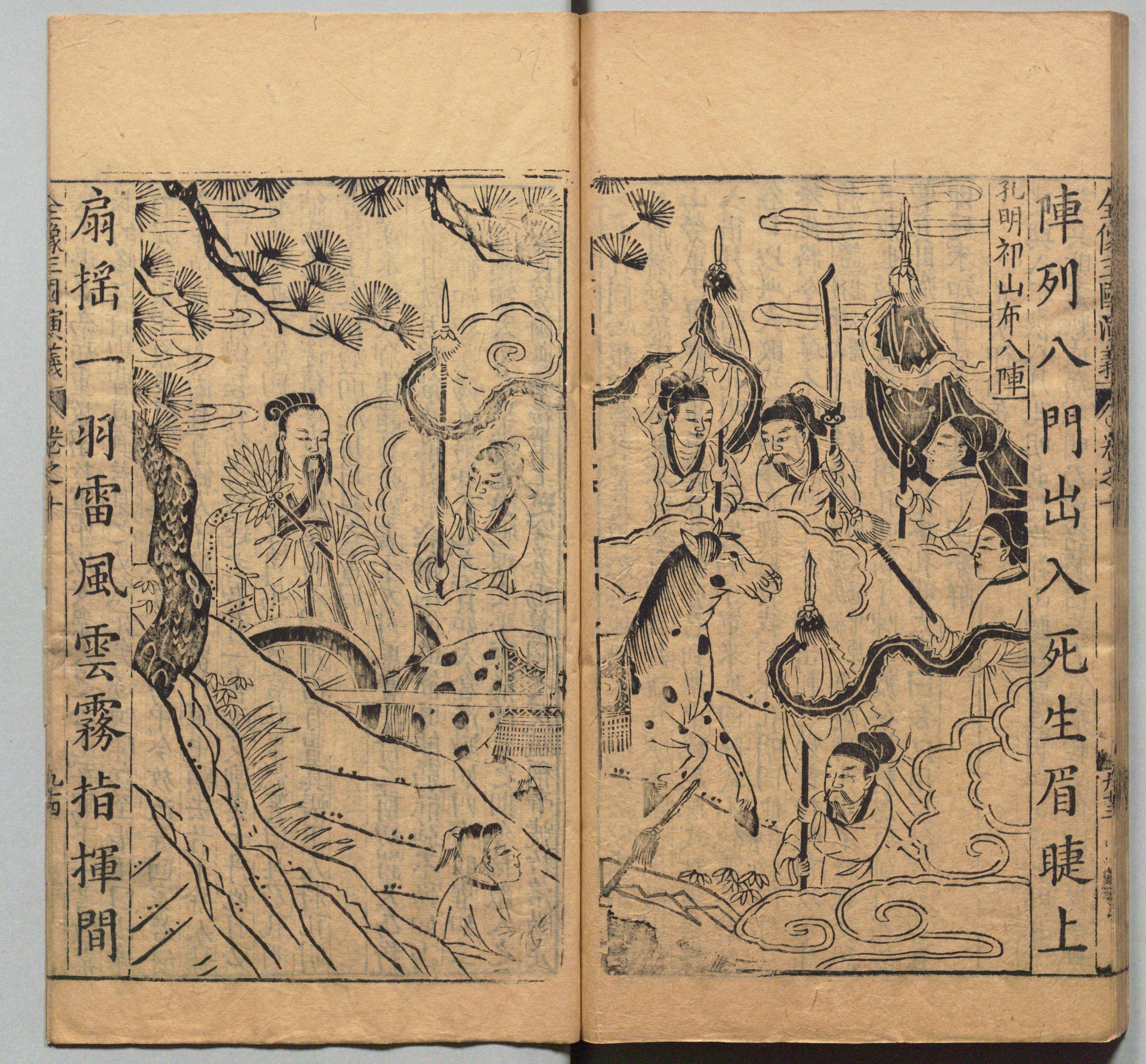
Ming dynasty woodblock print of Zhuge Liang setting up Baguazhen, or "Eight (Trigrams) Formation" (八卦阵).

In the spring of 228 Zhuge Liang ordered Zhao Yun and Deng Zhi to lead a detachment of troops to Ji Valley (箕谷) and pretend to attack Mei County (郿縣; southeast of Fufeng County, Shaanxi) via Xie Valley (斜谷). Their mission was to distract and hold the Wei forces' attention, while Zhuge Liang led the Shu main army to attack Mount Qi (祁山; the mountainous regions around Li County, Gansu). Upon reaching Mount Qi, Zhuge Liang deployed his troops in orderly formations and directed them with clear and strict commands. Three Wei-controlled commanderies – Nan'an (南安; around Longxi County, Gansu), Tianshui, and Anding (around Zhenyuan County, Gansu) – responded to the invasion by defecting to the Shu side. News of the Shu invasion sent shockwaves throughout the Guanzhong region. (Note: Chen and Pei 429, 35.922: "[建興]六年春，揚聲由斜谷道取郿，使趙雲、鄧芝為疑軍，據箕谷，魏大將軍曹真舉衆拒之。亮身率諸軍攻祁山，戎陣整齊，賞罰肅而號令明，南安、天水、安定三郡叛魏應亮，關中響震。")

The Wei government was stunned when they learnt of the Shu invasion and totally unprepared for it because they had lowered their guard against Shu after Liu Bei's death in 223 and had not heard anything from Shu since then. They were even more fearful and shocked when they heard of the three commanderies' defection. (Note: Yu, Weilüe: "始，國家以蜀中惟有劉備。備旣死，數歲寂然無聞，是以略無備預；而卒聞亮出，朝野恐懼，隴右、祁山尤甚，故三郡同時應亮。" Cited in Chen and Pei 429, 35.922 n. 1.) In response to the Shu invasion, Cao Rui moved from his imperial capital at Luoyang to Chang'an to oversee the defences in the Guanzhong region and provide backup. He sent Zhang He to attack Zhuge Liang at Mount Qi, (Note: Chen and Pei 429, 35.922: "魏明帝西鎮長安，命張郃拒亮。") and Cao Zhen to attack Zhao Yun and Deng Zhi at Ji Valley. (Note: Chen and Pei 429, 36.949, biography of Zhao Yun: "[建興]五年，隨諸葛亮駐漢中。明年，亮出軍，揚聲由斜谷道，曹真遣大衆當之。亮令雲與鄧芝往拒，而身攻祁山。雲、芝兵弱敵彊，失利於箕谷，然歛衆固守，不至大敗。")

Zhao Yun and Deng Zhi lost to Cao Zhen at the battle in Ji Valley. Zhuge Liang had given them command of the weaker soldiers while he led the better troops to attack Mount Qi. Nevertheless, Zhao Yun managed to rally his men into putting up a firm defence as they retreated, thus minimising their losses. In the meantime at Mount Qi, Zhuge Liang had put Ma Su in charge of the vanguard force to engage the enemy. At Jieting (街亭; or Jie Village, east of Qin'an County, Gansu), Ma Su not only went against Zhuge Liang's instructions, but also made the wrong moves, resulting in the Shu vanguard suffering a disastrous defeat at the hands of the Wei forces under Zhang He. Zhang He also seized the opportunity to attack and reclaim the three commanderies for Wei. (Note: Chen and Pei 429, 17.526, biography of Zhang He: "諸葛亮出祁山。加郃位特進，遣督諸軍，拒亮將馬謖於街亭。謖依阻南山，不下據城。郃絕其汲道，擊，大破之。南安、天水、安定郡反應亮，郃皆破平之。") (Note: Chen and Pei 429, 35.922: "亮使馬謖督諸軍在前，與郃戰于街亭。謖違亮節度，舉動失宜，大為郃所破。")

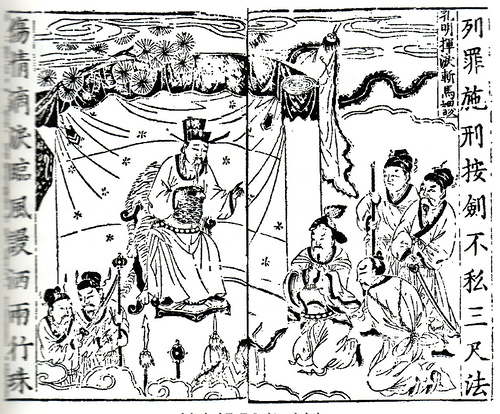
Kongming shedding tears as he subjects Ma Su to execution

Upon learning of the Shu defeats at Ji Valley and Jieting, Zhuge Liang pulled back the Shu forces and retreated to Hanzhong Commandery, where he resettled the few thousand families they captured in the Wei-controlled Xi County (西縣; present-day Li County, Gansu) during the campaign. This happened in the late spring of 228. Zhuge Liang executed Ma Su for disobeying orders and to appease public anger. (Note: Chen and Pei 429, 35.922: "亮拔西縣千餘家，還于漢中，戮謖以謝衆。") Afterward, he analysed why the campaign failed and told his subordinates:

Our armies at Mount Qi and Ji Valley together were superior to the enemy in numbers, yet we lost the battles. This wasn't because we had insufficient troops, but rather, it was due to one man. Now, we should reduce the number of troops and officers, instil greater discipline in the military, and reflect on our mistakes, so as to adapt and prepare ourselves for the future. If we can't do this, it won't be helpful even if we have more troops! From today, please raise whatever concerns you may have about the State, and point out my mistakes and flaws. We can then be more decisive and be able to defeat the enemy and move closer towards victory and success. (Note: Xi, Han–Jin Chunqiu: "或勸亮更發兵者，亮曰：「大軍在祁山、箕谷，皆多於賊，而不能破賊為賊所破者，則此病不在兵少也，在一人耳。今欲減兵省將，明罰思過，校變通之道於將來；若不能然者，雖兵多何益！自今已後，諸有忠慮於國，但勤攻吾之闕，則事可定，賊可死，功可蹻足而待矣。」" Cited in Chen and Pei 429, 35.923 n. 3.)

He also wrote a memorial to Liu Shan, taking full responsibility for the Shu defeats at Jieting and Ji Valley, acknowledging his mistakes and failure in judgment, and requesting to be demoted by three grades as punishment. (Note: Chen and Pei 429, 35.922: "上疏曰：「臣以弱才，叨竊非據，親秉旄鉞以厲三軍，不能訓章明法，臨事而懼，至有街亭違命之闕，箕谷不戒之失，咎皆在臣授任無方。臣明不知人，恤事多闇，春秋責帥，臣職是當。請自貶三等，以督厥咎。」") Liu Shan approved and symbolically demoted him from Imperial Chancellor to General of the Right (右將軍), but allowed him to remain as acting Imperial Chancellor and continue performing the same duties as he did before. (Note: Chen and Pei 429, 35.922: "於是以亮為右將軍，行丞相事，所總統如前。")

=== Siege of Chencang ===
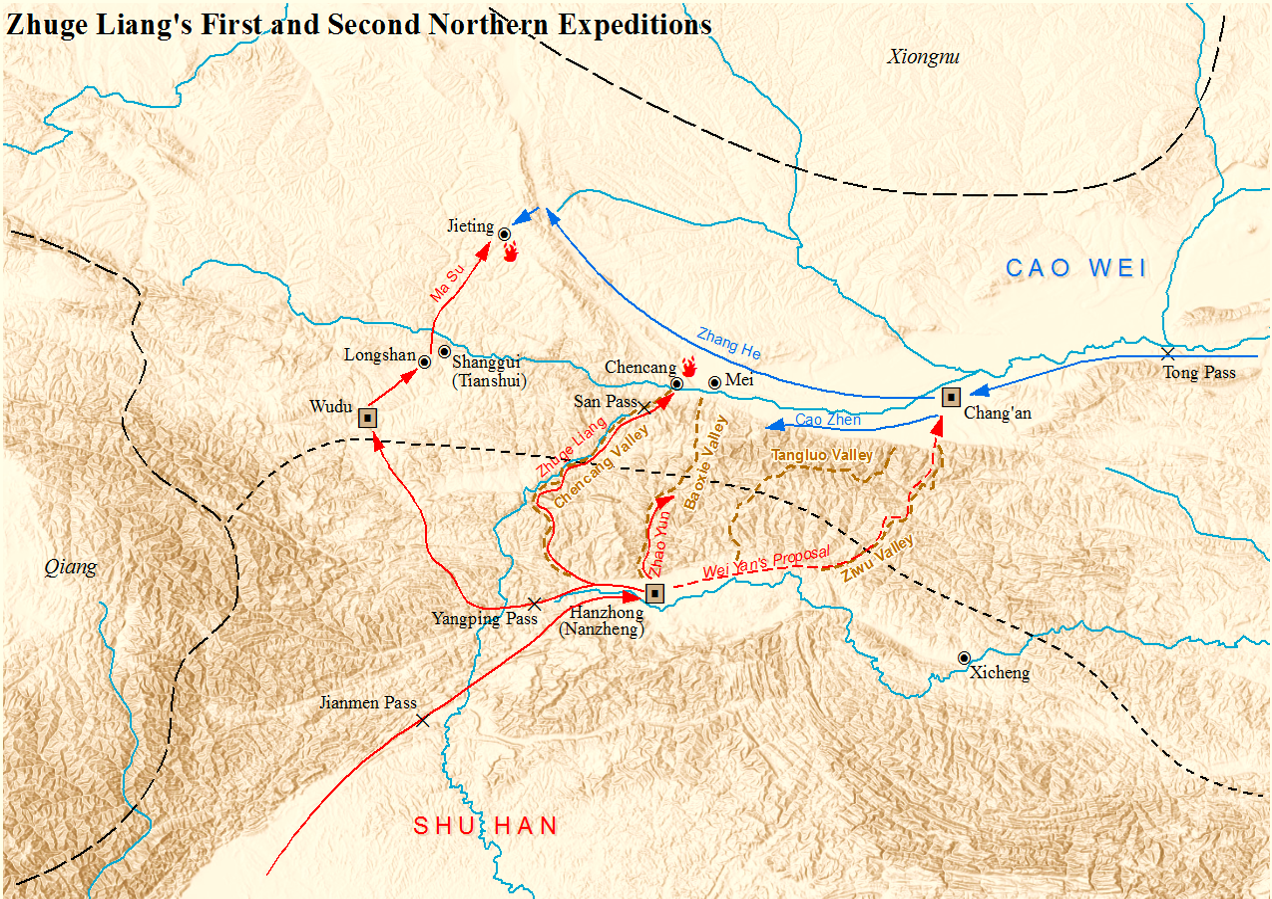
Map showing the first and second Northern Expeditions

Between late spring and early winter of 228, Zhuge Liang directed his efforts towards reorganising the Shu military, strengthening discipline, and training the troops in preparation for another campaign. (Note: Xi, Han–Jin Chunqiu: "於是考微勞，甄烈壯，引咎責躬，布所失於天下，厲兵講武，以為後圖，戎士簡練，民忘其敗矣。" Cited in Chen and Pei 429, 35.923 n. 3.) During this time, he received news that Shu's ally Wu had defeated Wei at the Battle of Shiting around September 228. From this, he deduced that the Wei defences in the Guanzhong region must be weaker because Wei had mobilised its best troops to the eastern front to fight Wu. (Note: Xi, Han–Jin Chunqiu: "亮聞孫權破曹休，魏兵東下，關中虛弱。" Cited in Chen and Pei 429, 35.923 n. 3.)

In December 228 Zhuge Liang allegedly wrote a second Chu Shi Biao to Liu Shan to urge war against Wei. (Note: Xi, Han–Jin Chunqiu: "十一月，上言曰：「先帝慮漢賊不兩立， ... 非臣之明所能逆覩也。」於是有散關之役。此表，亮集所無，出張儼默記。" Cited in Chen and Pei 429, 35.923–924 n. 3, with a comment that the quoted text does not appear in Chen Shou's Zhuge Liang ji, coming rather from Zhang Yan's "notes".) However, historians such as Qian Dazhao (錢大昭) have cast doubts on the authenticity of the second Chu Shi Biao and argued that it is falsely attributed to Zhuge Liang. Among other discrepancies, the second Chu Shi Biao differs sharply from the first Chu Shi Biao in tone, and already mentions Zhao Yun's death when the Sanguozhi recorded that he died in 229. (Note: Chen and Pei 429, 36.950, biography of Zhao Yun: "[建興]七年卒。")

In the winter of 228–229 Zhuge Liang launched the second Northern Expedition and led the Shu forces out of San Pass (north of the Qin Mountains to the south of Baoji, Shaanxi) to attack the Wei fortress at Chencang (陳倉; east of Baoji). Before the campaign, Zhuge Liang already knew that Chencang was heavily fortified and difficult to capture, so when he showed up he was surprised to see that the fortress was additionally very well-defended. In fact, after the first Shu invasion, the Wei general Cao Zhen had predicted that Zhuge Liang would attack Chencang so he put Hao Zhao, a Wei general with a fierce reputation in the Guanzhong region, in charge of defending Chencang and strengthening its defences. (Note: Chen and Pei 429, 9.281, biography of Cao Zhen: "[曹]眞以亮懲於祁山，後出必從陳倉，乃使將軍郝昭、王生守陳倉，治其城。明年春，亮果圍陳倉，已有備而不能克。")

Zhuge Liang first ordered his troops to surround Chencang, then sent Jin Xiang (靳詳), an old friend of Hao Zhao, to persuade Hao Zhao to surrender. Hao Zhao refused twice. (Note: Yu, Weilüe: "亮圍陳倉，使昭鄉人靳詳於城外遙說之， ...詳以昭語告亮，亮又使詳重說昭，言人兵不敵，無為空自破滅。 ...詳乃去。" Cited in Chen and Pei 429, 3.95 n. 4.) Although Hao Zhao had only 1,000 men with him to defend Chencang, he successfully held his ground against the Shu invaders. In the subsequent 20 days of siege, Zhuge Liang used an array of tactics to attack Chencang – siege ladders, battering rams, siege towers and underground tunnels – but Hao Zhao successfully countered each of them in turn. (Note: Yu, Weilüe: "亮自以有眾數萬，而昭兵才千餘人，又度東救未能便到，乃進兵攻昭，起雲梯衝車以臨城。昭於是以火箭逆射其雲梯，梯然，梯上人皆燒死。昭又以繩連石磨壓其衝車，衝車折。亮乃更為井闌百尺以射城中，以土丸填壍，欲直攀城，昭又於內築重牆。亮足為城突，欲踊出於城裏，昭又於城內穿地橫截之。" Cited in Chen and Pei 429, 3.95 n. 4.) After failing to outwit Hao Zhao and take Chencang, and after learning that Wei reinforcements were approaching, Zhuge Liang decided to pull back his troops and return to base. (Note: Yu, Weilüe: "晝夜相攻拒二十餘日，亮無計，救至，引退。" Cited in Chen and Pei 429, 3.95 n. 4.) Wang Shuang, a Wei officer, led his men to attack the retreating Shu forces, but was killed in an ambush laid by Zhuge Liang. (Note: Chen and Pei 429, 35.924: "冬，亮復出散關，圍陳倉，曹真拒之，亮糧盡而還。魏將王雙率騎追亮，亮與戰，破之，斬雙。")

=== Battle of Jianwei ===
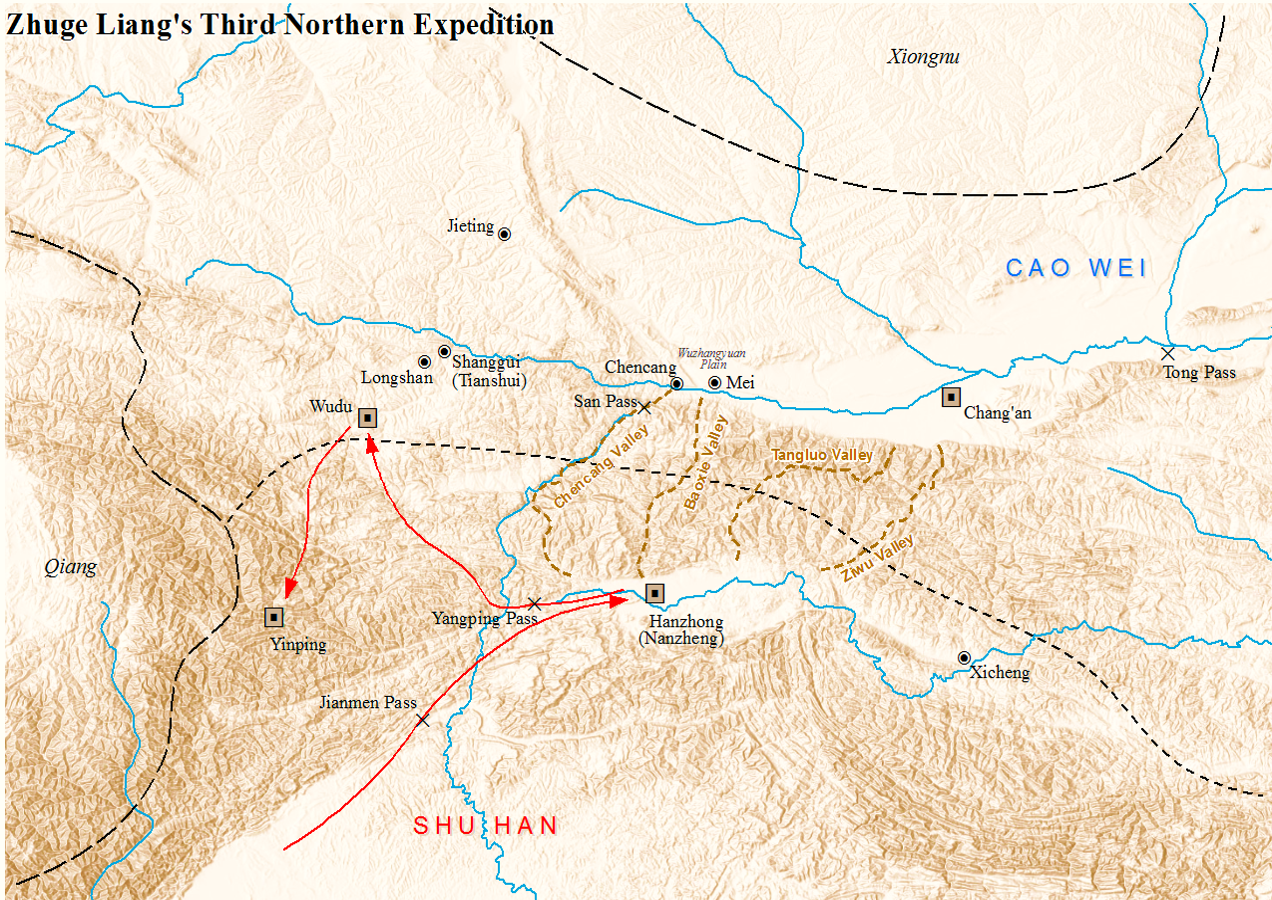
Map showing the Battle of Jianwei

In the spring of 229, Zhuge Liang launched the third Northern Expedition and ordered Chen Shi to lead Shu forces to attack the Wei-controlled Wudu (武都; around present-day Cheng County, Gansu) and Yinping (陰平; present-day Wen County, Gansu) commanderies. The Wei general Guo Huai led his troops to resist Chen Shi. He retreated when he heard that Zhuge Liang had led a Shu army to Jianwei (建威; in present-day Longnan, Gansu). The Shu forces then conquered Wudu and Yinping commanderies. (Note: Chen and Pei 429, 35.924: "[建興]七年，亮遣陳戒攻武都、陰平。魏雍州刺史郭淮率衆欲擊戒，亮自出至建威，淮退還，遂平二郡。")

When Zhuge Liang returned from the campaign, Liu Shan issued an imperial decree to congratulate him on his successes in defeating Wang Shuang during the second Northern Expedition and capturing Wudu and Yinping commanderies during the third Northern Expedition. He also restored Zhuge Liang to the position of Imperial Chancellor. (Note: Chen and Pei 429, 35.924: "詔策亮曰：「街亭之役，咎由馬謖，而君引愆，深自貶抑，重違君意，聽順所守。前年耀師，馘斬王雙；今歲爰征，郭淮遁走；降集氐、羌，興復二郡，威鎮凶暴，功勳顯然。方今天下騷擾，元惡未梟，君受大任，幹國之重，而乆自挹損，非所以光揚洪烈矣。今復君丞相，君其勿辭。」")

=== Congratulating Sun Quan on becoming emperor ===
Around May 229, Sun Quan, the ruler of Shu's ally state Wu, declared himself emperor and put himself on par with Liu Shan of Shu. When the news reached the Shu imperial court, many officials were outraged as they thought that Sun Quan had no right to be emperor, and so they urged the Shu government to break ties with Wu. (Note: Xi, Han–Jin Chunqiu: "是歲，孫權稱尊號，其羣臣以並尊二帝來告。議者咸以為交之无益，而名體弗順，宜顯明正義，絕其盟好。" Cited in Chen and Pei 429, 35.924 n. 1.) Although Zhuge Liang agreed that Sun Quan lacked legitimacy, he considered that the Wu–Shu alliance was vital to Shu's survival and long-term interests because they needed Wu to keep Wei occupied in the east while they attacked Wei in the west. After concluding that Shu should maintain the Wu–Shu alliance and refrain from criticising Sun Quan, (Note: Xi, Han–Jin Chunqiu: "亮曰：「權有僭逆之心久矣， ...權僭之罪，未宜明也。」" Cited in Chen and Pei 429, 35.924 n. 1.) he sent Chen Zhen on a diplomatic mission to Wu to recognise Sun Quan's claim to the throne and congratulate him. (Note: Xi, Han–Jin Chunqiu: "乃遣衞尉陳震慶權正號。" Cited in Chen and Pei 429, 35.925 n. 1 (continued from p. 924).)

=== Ziwu Campaign ===
In August 230, Cao Zhen led an army from Chang'an to attack Shu via the Ziwu Valley (子午谷). At the same time, another Wei army led by Sima Yi, acting on Cao Rui's order, advanced towards Shu from Jing Province by sailing along the Han River. The rendezvous point for Cao Zhen and Sima Yi's armies was at Nanzheng County (南鄭縣; in present-day Hanzhong, Shaanxi). Other Wei armies also prepared to attack Shu from the Xie Valley (斜谷) or Wuwei Commandery. (Note: Chen and Pei 429, 9.282, biography of Cao Zhen: "眞以八月發長安，從子午道南入。司馬宣王泝漢水，當會南鄭。諸軍或從斜谷道，或從武威入。")

When he heard of Wei recent movements, Zhuge Liang urged Li Yan to lead 20,000 troops to Hanzhong Commandery to defend against the Wei invasion which he reluctantly accepted after much persuasion. (Note: Chen and Pei 429, 40.999, biography of Li Yan: "八年，遷驃騎將軍。以曹真欲三道向漢川，亮命嚴將二萬人赴漢中。亮表嚴子豐為江州都督督軍，典嚴後事。") As Xiahou Ba led the vanguard of this expedition through the 330 km Ziwu Trail (子午道), he was identified by the local residents who reported his presence to the Shu forces. Xiahou Ba barely managed to retreat after reinforcements from the main army arrived. (Note: Yu, Weilüe: "黃初中為偏將軍。子午之役，霸召為前鋒，進至興勢圍，安營在曲谷中。蜀人望知其是霸也，指下兵攻之。霸手戰鹿角間，賴救至，然後解。" Cited in Chen and Pei 429, 9.272 n. 1, biography of Xiahou Yuan.)

Zhuge Liang also allowed Wei Yan to lead troops behind the enemy lines towards Yangxi (陽谿; southwest of present-day Wushan County, Gansu) to encourage the Qiang people to join Shu Han against Wei. Wei Yan decisively defeated Wei forces led by Guo Huai and Fei Yao. (Note: Chen and Pei 429, 40.1002, biography of Wei Yan: "八年，使延西入羌中，魏後將軍費瑤、雍州刺史郭淮與延戰于陽谿，延大破淮等，遷為前軍師征西大將軍，假節，進封南鄭侯。") Following those events, the conflict became a prolonged stalemate with few skirmishes. After more than a month of slow progress and fearing significant losses and waste of resources, more and more Wei officials sent memorials to end the campaign. The situation was not helped by the difficult topography and constant heavy rainy weather lasting more than 30 days. Cao Rui decided to abort the campaign and recalled the officers by October 230. (Note: Chen and Pei 429, 9.282, biography of Cao Zhen: "會大霖雨三十餘日，或棧道斷絕，詔眞還軍。")

=== Battle of Mount Qi ===
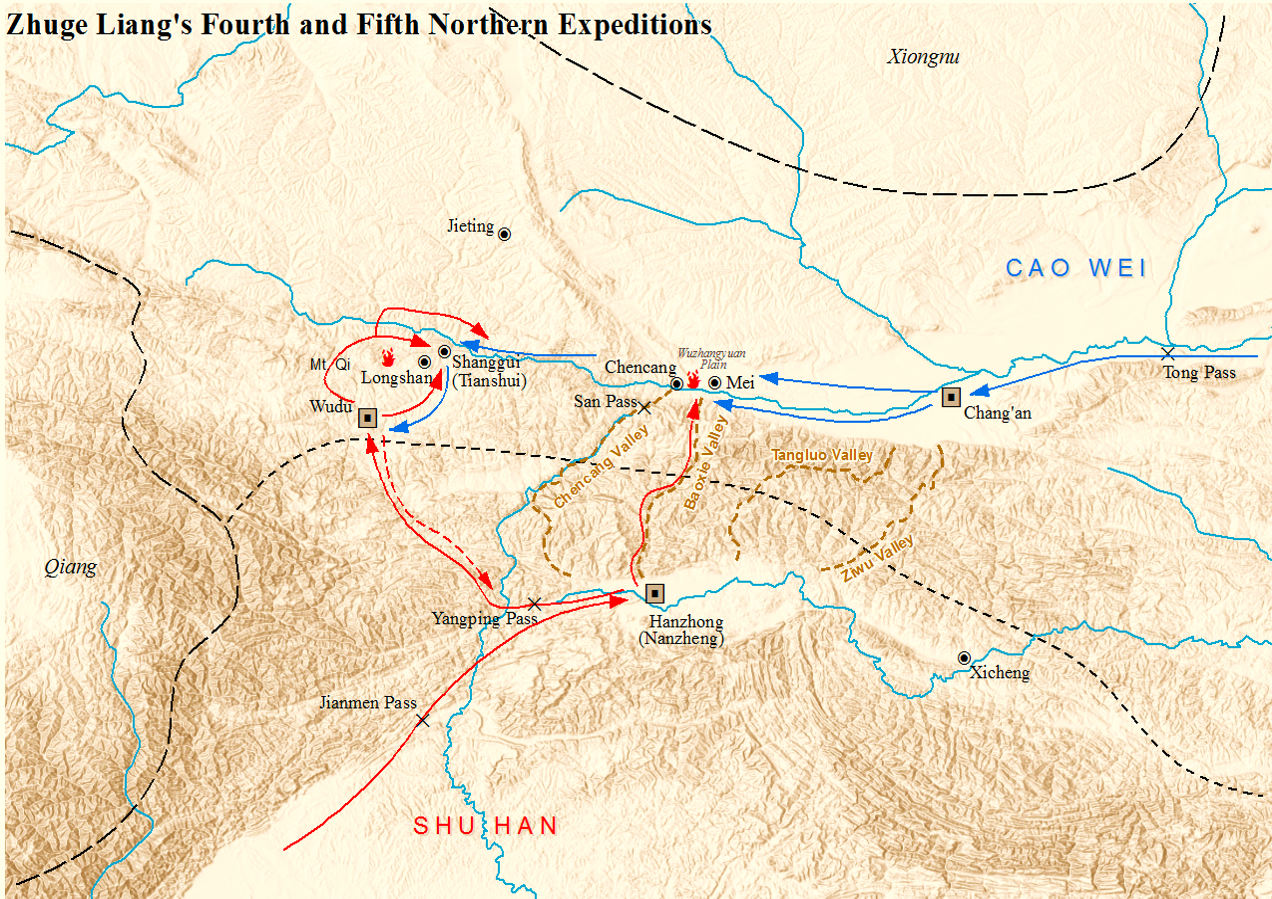
Map showing the Battle of Mount Qi and Battle of Wuzhang Plains

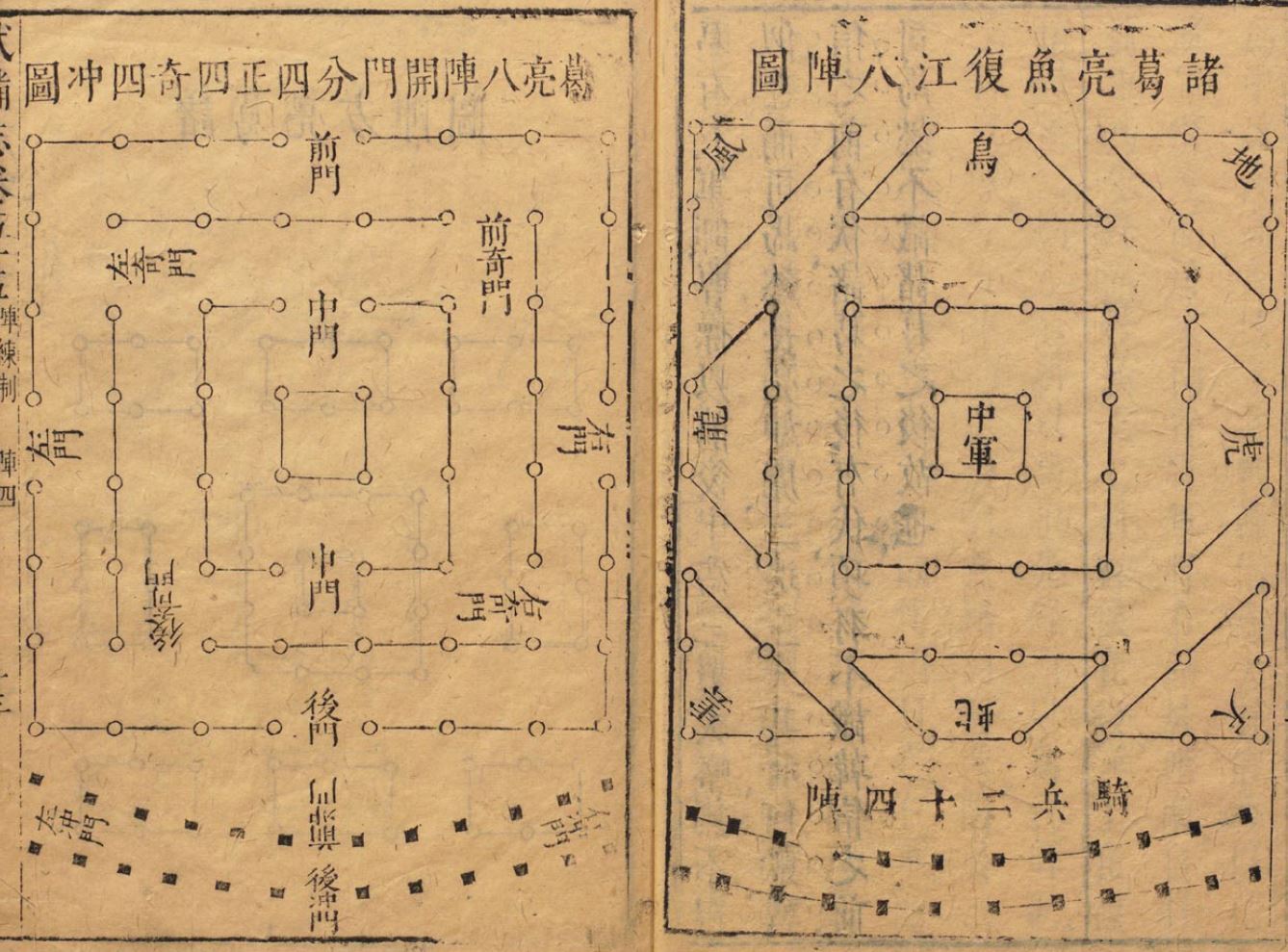
Wubei Zhi's diagram of the "Eight Trigrams (military) formation" (八卦陣) used by Zhuge Liang during military campaigns (Note: "亮性長於巧思，損益連弩，木牛流馬，皆出其意﹔推演兵法，作八陣圖，咸得其要云。" Cited in Chen and Pei 429, 35.925.)

In 230 Zhuge Liang launched the fourth Northern Expedition and attacked Mount Qi (祁山; the mountainous regions around present-day Li County, Gansu) again. He used the wooden ox, a mechanical device he invented, to transport food supplies to the frontline. (Note: Chen and Pei 429, 35.925: "[建興]九年，亮復出祁山，以木牛運。") The Shu forces attacked Tianshui Commandery and surrounded Mount Qi, which was defended by the Wei officers Jia Si (賈嗣) and Wei Ping (魏平). (Note: Book of Jin 648, vol. 1: "明年，諸葛亮寇天水，圍將軍賈嗣、魏平於祁山。") At Mount Qi, Zhuge Liang managed to convince Kebineng, a Xianbei tribal leader, to support Shu in the war against Wei. Kebineng went to Beidi Commandery (around present-day central Shaanxi) and rallied the locals to support Shu. (Note: Xi, Han–Jin Chunqiu: "亮圍祁山，招鮮卑軻比能，比能等至故北地石城以應亮。" Cited in Chen and Pei 429, 35.925 n. 1.)

At the time, as Grand Marshal Cao Zhen was ill, Cao Rui ordered the general Sima Yi to move to Chang'an to supervise the Wei defences in the Guanzhong region against the Shu invasion. After making preparations for battle, Sima Yi, with Zhang He, Fei Yao, Dai Ling (戴陵) and Guo Huai serving as his subordinates, led Wei forces to Yumi County (隃麋縣; east of present-day Qianyang County, Shaanxi) and stationed there. (Note: Book of Jin 648, vol. 1: "乃使帝西屯長安，都督雍、梁二州諸軍事，統車騎將軍張郃、後將軍費曜、征蜀護軍戴淩、雍州刺史郭淮等討亮。 ...遂進軍隃麋。") He then left Fei Yao and Dai Ling with 4,000 troops to guard Shanggui County (上邽縣; in present-day Tianshui, Gansu), while he led the others to Mount Qi to help Jia Si and Wei Ping. (Note: Xi, Han–Jin Chunqiu: "於是魏大司馬曹真有疾，司馬宣王自荊州入朝， ...乃使西屯長安，督張郃、費曜、戴陵、郭淮等。宣王使曜、陵留精兵四千守上邽，餘衆悉出，西救祁山。" Cited in Chen and Pei 429, 35.925 n. 1.)

When Zhuge Liang learnt of the Wei forces' approach, he split his forces into two groups – one group to remain at Mount Qi while he led the other group to attack Shanggui County. He defeated Guo Huai, Fei Yao and Dai Ling in battle and ordered his troops to collect the harvest in Shanggui County. In response, Sima Yi turned back from Mount Qi, headed to Shanggui County, and arrived within two days. By then, Zhuge Liang and his men had finished harvesting the wheat and were preparing to leave. (Note: Book of Jin 648, vol. 1: "亮聞大軍且至，乃自帥衆將芟上邽之麥。 ...於是卷甲晨夜赴之，亮望塵而遁。") Zhuge Liang encountered Sima Yi at Hanyang (漢陽) to the east of Shanggui County, but they did not engage in battle: Zhuge Liang ordered his troops to make use of the terrain and get into defensive positions; Sima Yi ordered his troops to get into formation, while sending Niu Jin to lead a lightly armed cavalry detachment to Mount Qi. The standoff ended when Zhuge Liang and the Shu forces retreated to Lucheng (鹵城), took control of the hills in the north and south, and used the river as a natural barrier. (Note: Xi, Han–Jin Chunqiu: "亮分兵留攻，自逆宣王于上邽。郭淮、費曜等徼亮，亮破之，因大芟刈其麥，與宣王遇于上邽之東，斂兵依險，軍不得交，亮引而還。宣王尋亮至于鹵城。" Cited in Chen and Pei 429, 35.925 n. 1.) (Note: Book of Jin 648, vol. 1: "進次漢陽，與亮相遇，帝列陣以待之。使將牛金輕騎餌之，兵才接而亮退，追至祁山。亮屯鹵城，據南北二山，斷水為重圍。")

Although his subordinates repeatedly urged him to attack the enemy, Sima Yi was hesitant to do so after seeing the layout of the Shu camps in the hills. However, he eventually relented when Jia Si and Wei Ping mocked him and said he would become a laughing stock if he refused to attack. (Note: Xi, Han–Jin Chunqiu: "張郃曰：「彼遠來逆我，請戰不得，謂我利在不戰，欲以長計制之也。且祁山知大軍以在近，人情自固，可止屯於此，分為奇兵，示出其後，不宜進前而不敢偪，坐失民望也。今亮縣軍食少，亦行去矣。」宣王不從，故尋亮。旣至，又登山掘營，不肯戰。賈栩、魏平數請戰，因曰：「公畏蜀如虎，柰天下笑何！」宣王病之。諸將咸請戰。" Cited in Chen and Pei 429, 35.925 n. 1.) Sima Yi then sent Zhang He to attack the Shu camp in the south, guarded by Wang Ping, while he led the others to attack Lucheng head-on. (Note: Xi, Han–Jin Chunqiu: "[建興九年]五月辛巳，乃使張郃攻无當監何平於南圍，自案中道向亮。" Cited in Chen and Pei 429, 35.925 n. 1.) In response, Zhuge Liang ordered Wei Yan, Wu Ban and Gao Xiang to lead troops to engage the enemy outside Lucheng. The Wei army lost the battle, along with 3,000 troops and some equipment. (Note: Xi, Han–Jin Chunqiu: "亮使魏延、高翔、吳班赴拒，大破之，獲甲首三千級、玄鎧五千領、角弩三千一百張，宣王還保營。" Cited in Chen and Pei 429, 35.925–926 n. 1.)

Despite his victory, Zhuge Liang could not make use of the momentum to launch a major offensive on the enemy because his army was running low on supplies. Sima Yi launched another attack on the Shu camps and succeeded in breaking through Zhuge Liang's defences. The Book of Jin recorded that as Zhuge and the Shu army retreated under the cover of night, Sima Yi led his forces in pursuit and inflicted over 10,000 casualties on the enemy. (Note: Book of Jin 648, vol. 1: "帝攻拔其圍，亮宵遁，追擊破之，俘斬萬計。") This account from the Book of Jin is disputed by historians (Note: Book of Jin 648, vol. 1: "縱其後出，不復攻城，當求野戰，必在隴東，不在西也。") and is not included in the 11th-century historical text Zizhi Tongjian.

In any case, according to Records of the Three Kingdoms and Zizhi Tongjian, Zhuge Liang retreated to the Shu because of lack of supply, not defeat. (Note: Chen and Pei 429, 35.925: "糧盡退軍，與魏將張郃交戰，射殺郃。") Zhang He led his troops to attack the retreating Shu forces but fell into an ambush and lost his life.

=== Battle of Wuzhang Plains ===
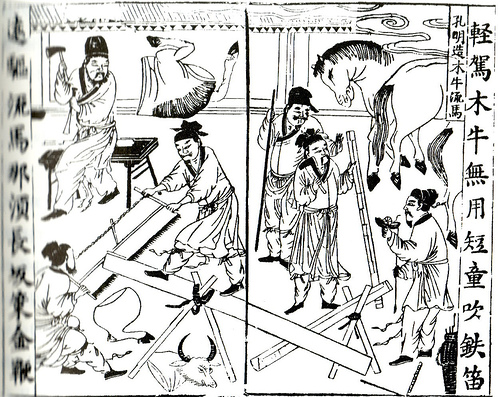
An illustration from a Qing dynasty edition of the historical novel Romance of the Three Kingdoms showing the wooden oxen and flowing horses (木牛流馬) used by the Shu army to transport supplies

In the spring of 234 Zhuge Liang led more than 100,000 Shu troops out of Xie Valley (斜谷) and camped at the Wuzhang Plains on the south bank of the Wei River near Mei County (郿縣; southeast of present-day Fufeng County, Shaanxi). Aside from using the flowing horse to transport food supplies to the frontline, he implemented a tuntian plan by ordering his troops to grow crops alongside civilians at the south bank of the Wei River. He also forbade his troops from taking the civilians' crops. (Note: Chen and Pei 429, 35.925: "亮每患糧不繼，使己志不申，是以分兵屯田，為久駐之基。耕者雜於渭濵居民之間，而百姓安堵，軍無私焉。" Chen and Pei 429, 35.925: "[建興]十二年春，亮悉大衆由斜谷出，以流馬運，據武功五丈原，與司馬宣王對於渭南。")

In response to the Shu invasion, the Wei general Sima Yi led his forces and another 20,000 reinforcements to the Wuzhang Plains to engage the enemy. After an initial skirmish (Note: Book of Jin 648, vol. 1: "遣將軍胡遵、雍州剌史郭淮共備陽遂，與亮會于積石。臨原而戰，亮不得進，還于五丈原。") and a night raid on the Shu camp, (Note: Book of Jin 648, vol. 1: "會有長星墜亮之壘，帝知其必敗，遣奇兵掎亮之後，斬五百餘級，獲生口千餘，降者六百餘人。") Sima Yi received orders from the Wei emperor Cao Rui to hold his ground and refrain from engaging the Shu forces. The battle became a stalemate. During this time, Zhuge Liang made several attempts to lure Sima Yi to attack him. On one occasion, he sent women's ornaments to Sima Yi to taunt him. An apparently angry Sima Yi sought permission from Cao Rui to attack the enemy, but was denied. Cao Rui even sent Xin Pi as his special representative to the frontline to ensure that Sima Yi followed orders and remained in camp. Zhuge Liang knew that Sima Yi was pretending to be angry because he wanted to show the Wei soldiers that he would not put up with Zhuge Liang's taunting, and to ensure that his men were ready for battle. (Note: Book of Jin 648, vol. 1: "時朝廷以亮僑軍遠寇，利在急戰，每命帝持重，以候其變。亮數挑戰，帝不出，因遺帝巾幗婦人之飾。帝怒，表請決戰，天子不許，乃遣骨鯁臣衞尉辛毗杖節為軍師以制之。") (Note: Xi, Han–Jin Chunqiu: "亮自至，數挑戰。宣王亦表固請戰。使衞尉辛毗持節以制之。姜維謂亮曰：「辛佐治仗節而到，賊不復出矣。」亮曰：「彼本無戰情，所以固請戰者，以示武於其衆耳。將在軍，君命有所不受，苟能制吾，豈千里而請戰邪！」" Cited in Chen and Pei 429, 35.926 n. 3.)

During the stalemate, when Zhuge Liang sent a messenger to meet Sima Yi, Sima Yi asked the messenger about Zhuge Liang's daily routine and living conditions. The messenger said that Zhuge Liang consumed three to four sheng of grain a day and that he micromanaged almost everything, except trivial issues like punishments for minor offences. After hearing this, Sima Yi remarked, "How can Zhuge Kongming expect to last long? He's going to die soon." (Note: Book of Jin 648, vol. 1: "先是，亮使至，帝問曰：「諸葛公起居何如，食可幾米？」對曰：「三四升。」次問政事，曰：「二十罰已上皆自省覽。」帝既而告人曰：「諸葛孔明其能久乎！」") (Note: Sun, Wei Shi Chunqiu: "亮使至，問其寢食及其事之煩簡，不問戎事。使對曰：「諸葛公夙興夜寐，罰二十以上，皆親擥焉；所噉食不至數升。」宣王曰：「亮將死矣。」" Cited in Chen and Pei 429, 35.926 n. 3.)

== Death and post-mortem events (234) ==
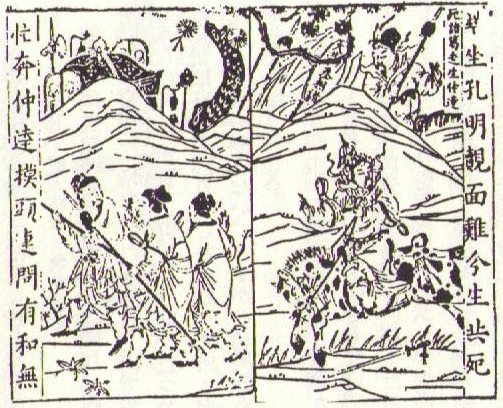
A Qing dynasty illustration of "a dead Zhuge drives away a living Zhongda"

The stalemate at the Wuzhang Plains lasted for over 100 days. (Note: Chen and Pei 429, 35.925: "相持百餘日。") Sometime between 11 September and 10 October 234, Zhuge Liang became critically ill and died in camp. He was 54 (by East Asian age reckoning) at the time of his death.

Sun Sheng's Jin Yangqiu (晉陽秋) recorded the following account:

A glowing red meteorite fell from the sky along the northeast-to-southwest direction towards (Zhuge) Liang's camp, bounced off the ground and landed again three times, expanding in size when it bounced off and shrinking in size as it landed. (Zhuge) Liang died shortly after. (Note: Sun, Jin Yangqiu: "有星赤而芒角，自東北西南流，投于亮營，三投再還，往大還小。俄而亮卒。" Cited in Chen and Pei 429, 35.926 n. 4.)

The Book of Wei (魏書) and Han–Jin Chunqiu (漢晉春秋) gave different accounts of where Zhuge Liang died. The former recorded that Zhuge Liang vomited blood in frustration when his army ran out of supplies during the stalemate and he ordered his troops to burn down their camp and retreat into a valley, where he fell sick and died. (Note: Wang, Book of Wei: "亮糧盡勢窮，憂恚歐血，一夕燒營遁走，入谷，道發病卒。" Cited in Chen and Pei 429, 35.926 n. 4.) The latter recorded that he died in the residence of a certain Guo family. (Note: Xi, Han–Jin Chunqiu: "亮卒于郭氏塢。" Cited in Chen and Pei 429, 35.926 n. 4.) In his annotations to Zhuge Liang's biography, Pei Songzhi pointed out that the Wei Shu and Han–Jin Chunqiu accounts were wrong, and that Zhuge Liang actually died in camp at the Wuzhang Plains. He also rebutted the Wei Shu account as follows:

"It was unclear from the situation (at the Battle of Wuzhang Plains) which side was winning and which side was losing. (The Wei Shu) was exaggerating when it said that (Zhuge) Liang vomited blood. Given Kongming's brilliance, was it likely for him to vomit blood because of Zhongda? (Note: "Zhongda" was Sima Yi's courtesy name.) This exaggeration originated from a note written by Emperor Yuan of Jin which said '(Zhuge) Liang lost the battle and vomited blood'. The reason why (the Wei Shu) said that Zhuge Liang died in a valley was because the Shu army only released news of Zhuge Liang's death after they entered the valley." (Note: Pei Songzhi, in Chen and Pei 429, 35.926–927 n. 4: "臣松之以為亮在渭濵，魏人躡跡，勝負之形，未可測量，而云歐血，蓋因亮自亡而自誇大也。夫以孔明之略，豈為仲達歐血乎？及至劉琨喪師，與晉元帝箋亦云「亮軍敗歐血」，此則引虛記以為言也。其云入谷而卒，緣蜀人入谷發喪故也。")

When Sima Yi heard from civilians that Zhuge Liang had died from illness and the Shu army had burnt down their camp and retreated, he led his troops in pursuit and caught up with them. The Shu forces, on Yang Yi and Jiang Wei's command, turned around and readied themselves for battle. Sima Yi pulled back his troops and retreated. Some days later, while surveying the remains of the Shu camp, Sima Yi remarked, "What a genius he was!" (Note: Chen and Pei 429, 35.925: "及軍退，宣王案行其營壘處所，曰：「天下奇才也！」") Based on his observations that the Shu army made a hasty retreat, he concluded that Zhuge Liang had indeed died, so he led his troops in pursuit again. When Sima Yi reached Chi'an (赤岸), he asked the civilians living there about Zhuge Liang and heard that there was a recent popular saying: "A dead Zhuge (Liang) scares away a living Zhongda" He laughed and said, "I can predict the thoughts of the living but I can't predict the dead's." (Note: Xi, Han–Jin Chunqiu: "楊儀等整軍而出，百姓奔告宣王，宣王追焉。姜維令儀反旗鳴鼓，若將向宣王者，宣王乃退，不敢偪。於是儀結陣而去，入谷然後發喪。宣王之退也，百姓為之諺曰：「死諸葛走生仲達。」或以告宣王，宣王曰：「吾能料生，不便料死也。」" Cited in Chen and Pei 429, 35.927 n. 5.) (Note: Book of Jin 648, vol. 1: "與之對壘百餘日，會亮病卒，諸將燒營遁走，百姓奔告，帝出兵追之。亮長史楊儀反旗鳴皷，若將距帝者。帝以窮寇不之逼，於是楊儀結陣而去。經日，乃行其營壘，觀其遺事，獲其圖書、糧穀甚衆。帝審其必死， ...追到赤岸，乃知亮死審問。時百姓為之諺曰：「死諸葛走生仲達。」帝聞而笑曰：「吾便料生，不便料死故也。」")

== Burial and posthumous honours ==
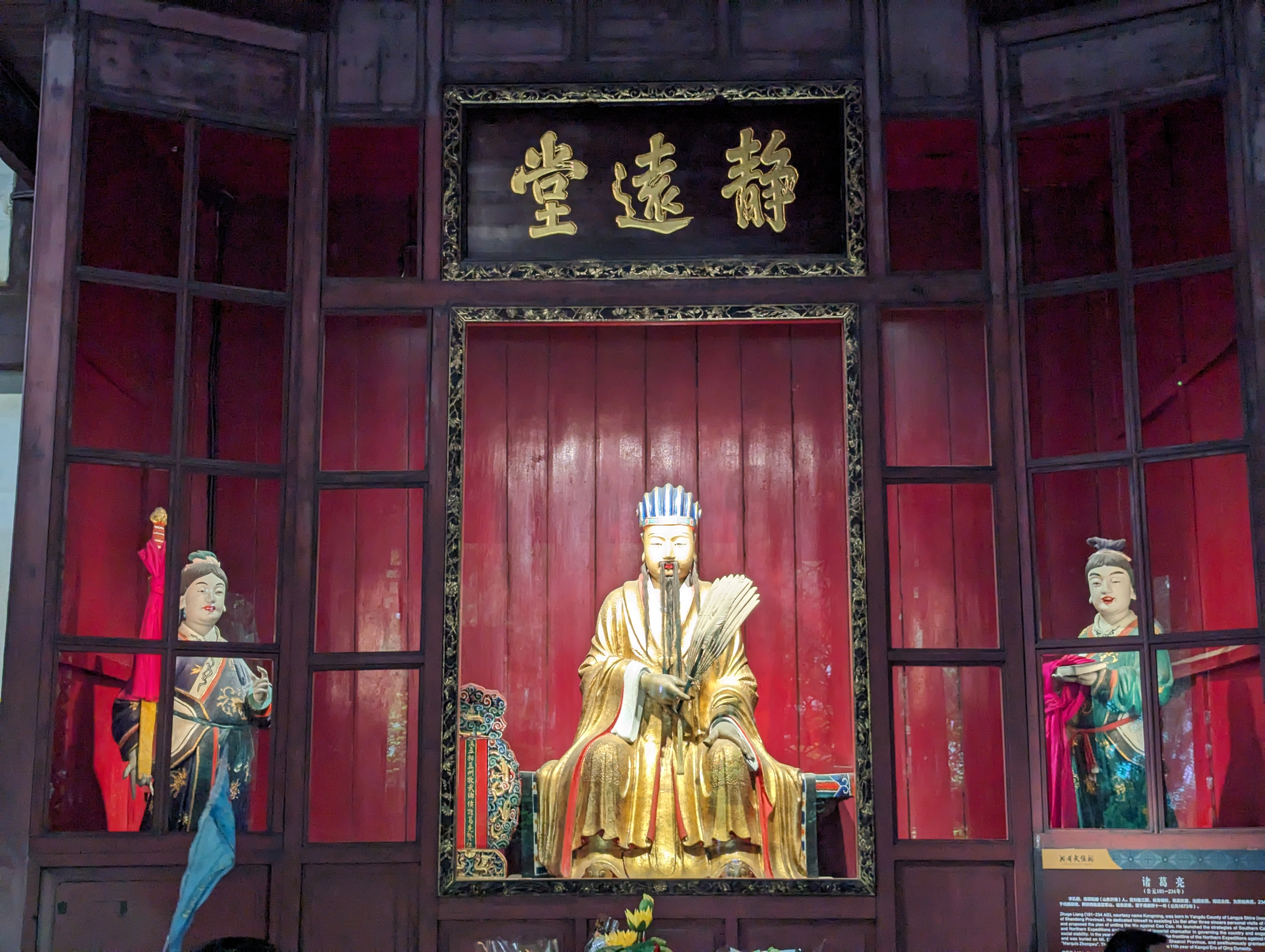
A sculpture of Zhuge Liang in the Temple of Marquis of Wu in Chengdu, Sichuan

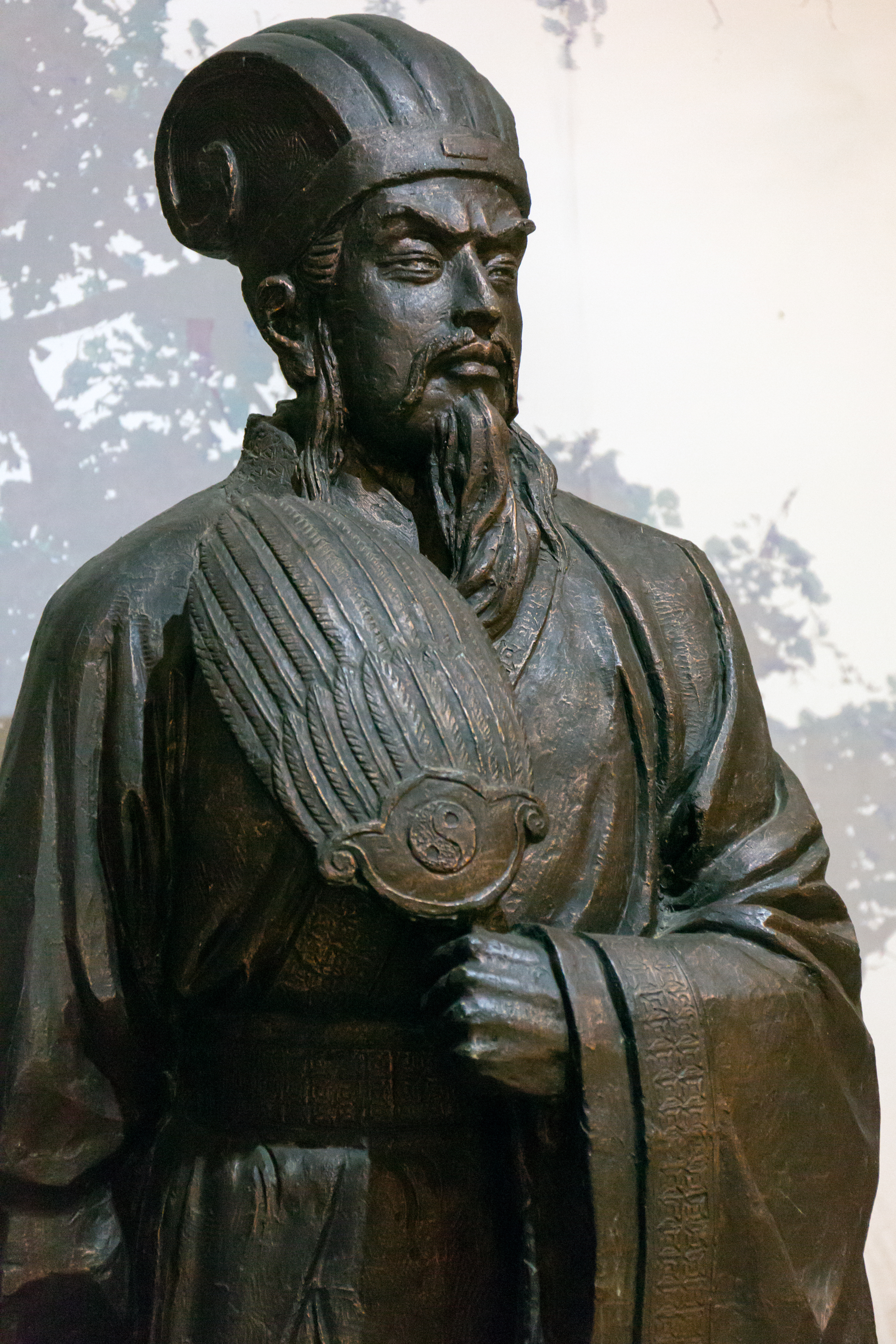
Statue of Zhuge Liang in Wuzhang Plains' Temple of Marquis Wu, Baoji, Shaanxi

Before his death, Zhuge Liang said that he wanted to be buried as simply as possible in Mount Dingjun (in present-day Mian County, Hanzhong, Shaanxi): his tomb should be just large enough for his coffin to fit in; he was to be dressed in the clothes he wore when he died; he did not need to be buried with any decorative objects or ornaments. (Note: Chen and Pei 429, 35.927: "亮遺命葬漢中定軍山，因山為墳，冢足容棺，歛以時服，不須器物。") Liu Shan issued an imperial edict to mourn and eulogise Zhuge Liang, as well as to confer on him the posthumous title "Marquis Zhongwu" (忠武侯; "loyal martial marquis"). (Note: Chen and Pei 429, 35.927: "詔策曰：「惟君體資文武，明叡篤誠，受遺託孤，匡輔朕躬，繼絕興微，志存靖亂；爰整六師，無歲不征，神武赫然，威鎮八荒，將建殊功於季漢，參伊、周之巨勳。如何不弔，事臨垂克，遘疾隕喪！朕用傷悼，肝心若裂。夫崇德序功，紀行命謚，所以光昭將來，刊載不朽。今使使持節左中郎將杜瓊，贈君丞相武鄉侯印綬，謚君為忠武侯。魂而有靈，嘉茲寵榮。嗚呼哀哉！嗚呼哀哉！」")

Zhuge Liang once wrote a memorial to Liu Shan as follows and kept his promise until his death: (Note: Chen and Pei 429, 35.927: "及卒，如其所言。")

"(I have) 800 mulberry trees and 15 qing of farmland in Chengdu, and my family have more than enough to feed and clothe themselves. When I am away (from Chengdu) on assignment, I do not incur any excess expenses. I depend solely on my official salary for my personal expenses. I do not run any private enterprises to generate additional income. If I have any excess silk and wealth at the time of my death, I would have let Your Majesty down." (Note: Chen and Pei 429, 35.927: "初，亮自表後主曰：「成都有桑八百株，薄田十五頃，子弟衣食，自有餘饒。至於臣在外任，無別調度，隨身衣食，悉仰於官，不別治生，以長尺寸。若臣死之日，不使內有餘帛，外有贏財，以負陛下。」")

In the spring of 263, Liu Shan ordered a memorial temple for Zhuge Liang to be built in Mianyang County (沔陽縣; present-day Mian County, Shaanxi). (Note: Chen and Pei 429, 35.928: "景耀六年春，詔為亮立廟於沔陽。") Initially, when Zhuge Liang died in 234, many people wanted the Shu government to build memorial temple to honour him. However, after some discussion, the government decided not to because it was not in accordance with Confucian rules of propriety. In his works, Sima Guang noted that during the Han era, only emperors were worshiped at temples. With no official channels to worship Zhuge Liang, the people took to holding their own private memorial services for Zhuge Liang on special occasions. Some time later, some people pointed out that it was appropriate to build a memorial temple for Zhuge Liang in Chengdu, but the Shu emperor Liu Shan refused. Two officials, Xi Long (習隆) and Xiang Chong, then wrote a memorial to Liu Shan and managed to convince him to build the memorial temple in Mianyang County. (Note: Xi, Xiangyang Ji: "亮初亡，所在各求為立廟，朝議以禮秩不聽，百姓遂因時節私祭之於道陌上。言事者或以為可聽立廟於成都者，後主不從。步兵校尉習隆、中書郎向充等共上表曰：「臣聞周人懷召伯之德，甘棠為之不伐；越王思范蠡之功，鑄金以存其像。自漢興以來，小善小德而圖形立廟者多矣。況亮德範遐邇，勳蓋季世，王室之不壞，實斯人是賴，而蒸甞止於私門，廟像闕而莫立，使百姓巷祭，戎夷野祀，非所以存德念功，述追在昔者也。今若盡順民心，則瀆而無典，建之京師，又偪宗廟，此聖懷所以惟疑也。臣愚以為宜因近其墓，立之於沔陽，使所親屬以時賜祭，凡其臣故吏欲奉祠者，皆限至廟。斷其私祀，以崇正禮。」於是始從之。" Cited in Chen and Pei 429, 35.928–929 n. 1.)

In the autumn of 263, during the Wei invasion of Shu, the Wei general Zhong Hui passed by Zhuge Liang's memorial temple in Mianyang County along the way and paid his respects there. He also ordered his troops to refrain from farming and logging anywhere near Zhuge Liang's tomb at Mount Dingjun. (Note: Chen and Pei 429, 35.928: "秋，魏鎮西將軍鍾會征蜀，至漢川，祭亮之廟，令軍士不得於亮墓所左右芻牧樵採。")

== Guo Chong's five anecdotes ==
The Shu Ji (蜀記), by Wang Yin (王隱), recorded that sometime in the early Jin dynasty, Sima Jun (232–286), the Prince of Fufeng (扶風王), once had a discussion about Zhuge Liang with his subordinates Liu Bao (劉寶), Huan Xi (桓隰) and others. Many of them brought up negative points about Zhuge Liang: making a bad choice when he chose to serve under Liu Bei; creating unnecessary burden and stress for the people of Shu; being overly ambitious; and lacking awareness about the limits of his strengths and abilities. However, there was one Guo Chong (郭沖) who dissented and argued that Zhuge Liang's brilliance and wisdom exceeded that of Guan Zhong and Yan Ying. He then shared five anecdotes about Zhuge Liang which he claimed nobody had heard of. Liu Bao, Huan Xi and the others fell silent after hearing the five anecdotes. Sima Jun even generously endorsed the five anecdotes by Guo Chong. (Note: Wang, Shu ji: "晉初，扶風王駿鎮關中，司馬高平劉寶、長史熒陽桓隰諸官屬士大夫共論諸葛亮，于時譚者多譏亮託身非所，勞困蜀民，力小謀大，不能度德量力。金城郭沖以為亮權智英略，有踰管、晏，功業未濟，論者惑焉，條亮五事隱沒不聞於世者，寶等亦不能復難。扶風王慨然善冲之言。" Cited in Chen and Pei 429, 35.917 n. 1.)

Pei Songzhi, when annotating Zhuge Liang's official biography in the Sanguozhi, found the five anecdotes unreliable and questionable, but he still added them into Zhuge Liang's biography and pointed out the problems in each of them. (Note: Pei Songzhi, in Chen and Pei 429, 35.917 n. 1: "臣松之以為亮之異美，誠所願聞，然冲之所說，實皆可疑，謹隨事難之如左。") In his concluding remarks, Pei Songzhi noted that the fourth-century historians Sun Sheng and Xi Zuochi, given their attention to detail, most probably came across Guo Chong's five anecdotes while doing research on the Three Kingdoms period. He surmised that Sun Sheng and Xi Zuochi probably omitted the anecdotes in their writings because they, like him, also found the anecdotes unreliable and questionable. (Note: Pei Songzhi, in Chen and Pei 429, 35.926 n. 2: "孫盛、習鑿齒搜求異同，罔有所遺，而並不載沖言，知其乖剌多矣。")

=== Harsh laws ===
In the first anecdote, Guo Chong claimed that Zhuge Liang incurred much resentment from the people when he implemented harsh and draconian laws in Yi Province (covering present-day Sichuan and Chongqing). Fa Zheng, an adviser to Liu Bei, tried to dissuade Zhuge Liang from doing so as he believed that the harsh and draconian laws would drive a wedge between the people of Yi Province and Liu Bei's government. He further pointed out that the government lacked popular support and political legitimacy at the time because some people saw Liu Bei as a foreign invader who occupied Yi Province by military force. Fa Zheng then urged Zhuge Liang to relax the laws and give the people some "breathing space". (Note: Wang, Shu ji, quoting Guo Chong: "其一事曰：亮刑法峻急，刻剥百姓，自君子小人咸懷怨歎，法正諫曰：「昔高祖入關，約法三章，秦民知德，今君假借威力，跨據一州，初有其國，未垂惠撫；且客主之義，宜相降下，願緩刑弛禁，以慰其望。」" Cited in Chen and Pei 429, 35.917 n. 1.) In response, Zhuge Liang argued that harsh laws were necessary to restore law and order in Yi Province and help Liu Bei's government consolidate its control over the territories and people. He blamed Liu Yan's 'soft' rule and Liu Zhang's incompetence for allowing corruption and decadence to become deeply entrenched in Yi Province. He also argued that the best way to set things right was to restore law and order and to regulate the distribution of honours and privileges among the population. (Note: Wang, Shu ji, quoting Guo Chong quoting Zhuge Liang: "亮荅曰；「君知其一，未知其二。秦以無道，政苛民怨，匹夫大呼，天下土崩，高祖因之，可以弘濟。劉璋闇弱，自焉已來有累世之恩，文法羈縻，互相承奉，德政不舉，威刑不肅。蜀土人士，專權自恣，君臣之道，漸以陵替；寵之以位，位極則賤，順之以恩，恩竭則慢。所以致弊，實由於此。吾今威之以法，法行則知恩，限之以爵，爵加則知榮；榮恩並濟，上下有節。為治之要，於斯而著。」" Cited in Chen and Pei 429, 35.917 n. 1.)

Pei Songzhi pointed out three problems in this anecdote. First, when Fa Zheng and Liu Bei were still alive, Zhuge Liang was never in a position powerful enough for him to implement such a policy; he would have to be the Governor of Yi Province (益州牧) to do so, but he only became Governor of Yi Province (in addition to other appointments) during Liu Shan's reign. Second, as Zhuge Liang is known for being a respectful, humble and faithful subject, it seemed totally out of place for him to advocate such a policy and make such a crude response to Fa Zheng. Third, good governance, which Zhuge Liang is known for, is not normally associated with harsh laws. (Note: Pei Songzhi, in Chen and Pei 429, 35.917 n. 1: "難曰：案法正在劉主前死，今稱法正諫，則劉主在也。諸葛職為股肱，事歸元首，劉主之世，亮又未領益州，慶賞刑政不出於己。尋沖所述亮荅，專自有其能，有違人臣自處之宜。以亮謙順之體，殆必不然。又云亮刑法峻急，刻剥百姓，未聞善政以刻剥為稱。")

=== Assassination attempt on Liu Bei ===
In the second anecdote, Guo Chong claimed that Cao Cao once sent an assassin to kill Liu Bei. When the assassin first met Liu Bei, he could only speak to Liu Bei from a distance, so he thought of a way to attract Liu Bei's attention and get up close. He started analysing the situation in Cao Cao's domain and presented ideas to Liu Bei on how to attack it. Liu Bei found his ideas interesting and asked him to come closer. Just then, Zhuge Liang came into the meeting room and caused the assassin to panic. He noticed the assassin's facial expression and found him suspicious. The assassin then excused himself, saying that he needed to use the latrine, Liu Bei told Zhuge Liang, "I found an extraordinary man who can be a good assistant to you." When Zhuge Liang asked who it was, Liu Bei said, "The man who just went to the latrine." Zhuge Liang took a deep breath and said, "Just now, I saw a look of fear and panic on his face. His avoidance of eye contact and his body language show that he has something evil on his mind. He must be an assassin sent by Cao Cao." Liu Bei immediately ordered the assassin's arrest but the assassin had already fled. (Note: Wang, Shu ji, quoting Guo Chong: "其二事曰：曹公遣刺客見劉備，方得交接，開論伐魏形勢，甚合備計。稍欲親近，刺者尚未得便會，旣而亮入，魏客神色失措。亮因而察之，亦知非常人。須臾，客如厠，備謂亮曰；「向得奇士，足以助君補益。」亮問所在，備曰：「起者其人也。」亮徐歎曰：「觀客色動而神懼，視低而忤數，姦形外漏，邪心內藏，必曹氏刺客也。」追之，已越墻而走。" Cited in Chen and Pei 429, 35.917 n. 1.)

Pei Songzhi pointed out the problems in this anecdote. If this incident really happened, the assassin must be a great talent to be able to attract Liu Bei's attention and, in Liu Bei's opinion, worthy enough to serve as an assistant to Zhuge Liang. However, this was unlikely because assassins were typically rough and boorish men ready to sacrifice their lives to accomplish their mission. Besides, it did not make much sense for a man of such talent to be an assassin when he could be better off as an adviser to any of the great warlords. Moreover, as Cao Cao was known for respecting and cherishing talents, it was unlikely that he would willingly sacrifice someone of such talent by sending him on a risky mission. Furthermore, given the significance of this incident, it should be recorded in history, but there is no mention of it in the official histories. (Note: Pei Songzhi, in Chen and Pei 429, 35.918 n. 1 (continued from previous page): "難曰：凡為刺客，皆暴虎馮河，死而無悔者也。劉主有知人之鑒，而惑於此客，則此客必一時之奇士也。又語諸葛云「足以助君補益」，則亦諸葛之流亞也。凡如諸葛之儔，鮮有為人作刺客者矣，時主亦當惜其器用，必不投之死地也。且此人不死，要應顯達為魏，竟是誰乎？何其寂蔑而無聞！")

=== Empty Fort Strategy ===
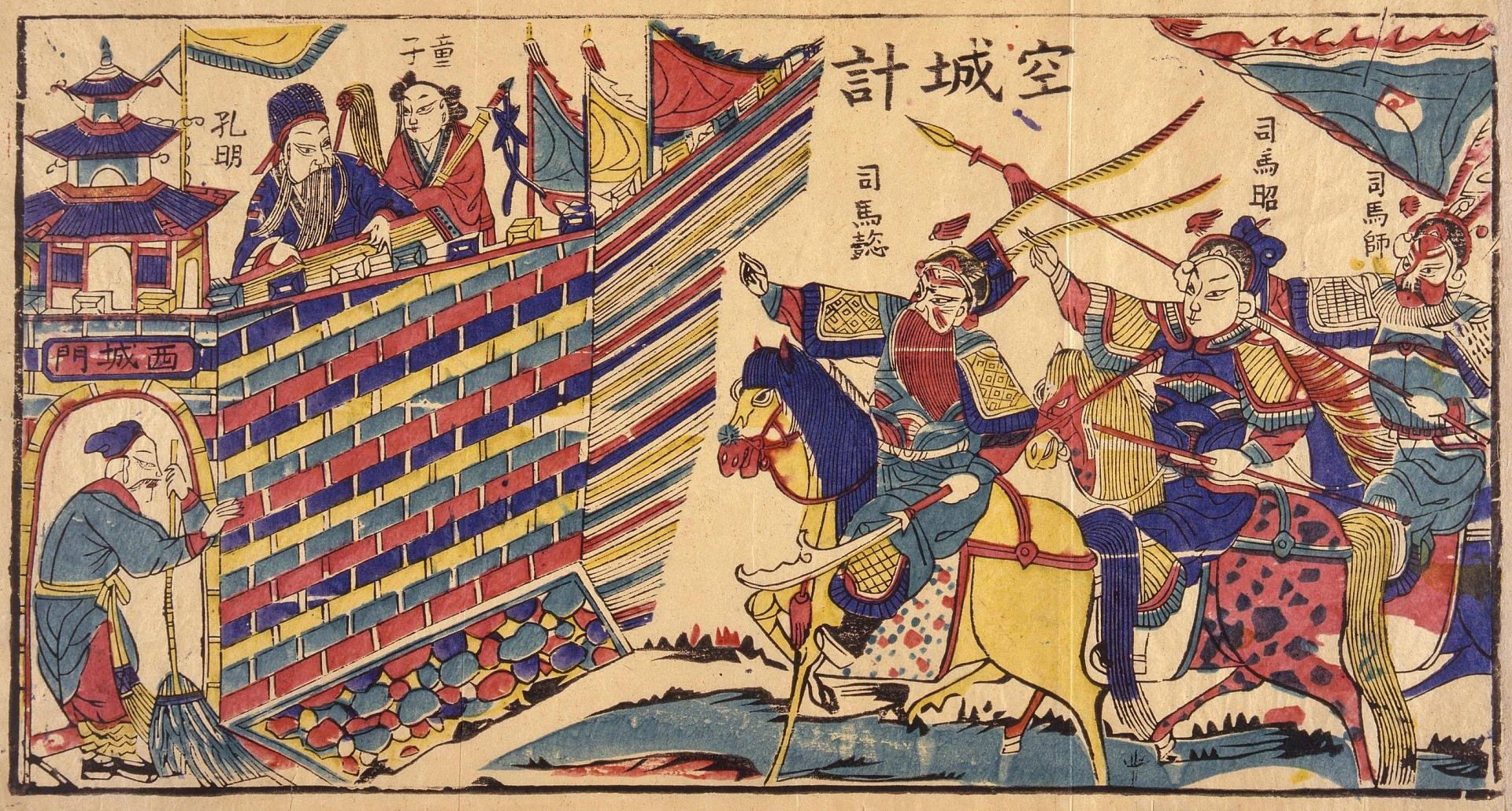
Zhuge Liang against Sima Yi with his sons Sima Zhao and Sima Shi, as depicted in the artwork Ruse with an Empty City

Guo Chong's third anecdote concerns Zhuge Liang's alleged use of the Empty Fort Strategy against Sima Yi at Yangping (陽平). (Note: Chen and Pei 429, 35.921 n. 5)

=== Rejecting compliments ===
In the fourth anecdote, Guo Chong claimed that when Zhuge Liang returned to Chengdu after the first Northern Expedition, he received many compliments from his colleagues for his successes in capturing a few thousand Wei families and making Jiang Wei defect to Shu. However, to their surprise, Zhuge Liang solemnly replied, "All the people under Heaven are people of the Han Empire. Now, the Han Empire isn't revived yet and the people are still suffering from war. It will be my fault even if only one person dies due to war. I dare not accept compliments built on people's miseries." The people of Shu then realised that his goal was to vanquish Wei rather than simply expanding Shu's borders through conquests. (Note: Wang, Shu ji, quoting Guo Chong: "郭沖四事曰：亮出祁山，隴西、南安二郡應時降，圍天水，拔兾城，虜姜維，驅略士女數千人還蜀。人皆賀亮，亮顏色愀然有戚容，謝曰：「普天之下，莫非漢民，國家威力未舉，使百姓困於犲狼之吻。一夫有死，皆亮之罪，以此相賀，能不為愧。」於是蜀人咸知亮有吞魏之志，非惟拓境而已。" Cited in Chen and Pei 429, 35.922 n. 2.)

Pei Songzhi pointed out that Zhuge Liang's goal of achieving a complete victory over Wei was already well known before he went on the first Northern Expedition, so it seemed very odd for Guo Chong to say that the people of Shu only realised it after Zhuge Liang came back from the first Northern Expedition. He also noted that the first Northern Expedition was an overall failure so the "successes" mentioned in this anecdote neither made sense nor were worthy of compliments. The reasons he gave were as such: Shu lost two battles against Wei in the first Northern Expedition and ultimately failed to conquer the three commanderies; Wei had nothing to lose from the defection of Jiang Wei, who at the time was a relative nobody; and the capture of the few thousand Wei families was insufficient to make up for the casualties the Shu forces suffered at Jieting and Ji Valley. (Note: Pei Songzhi, in Chen and Pei 429, 35.922–923 n. 2: "難曰：亮有吞魏之志乆矣，不始於此衆人方知也，且于時師出無成，傷缺而反者衆，三郡歸降而不能有。姜維，天水之匹夫耳，獲之則於魏何損？拔西縣千家，不補街亭所喪，以何為功，而蜀人相賀乎？")

=== Earning the trust of soldiers ===
In the fifth anecdote, Guo Chong claimed that during the fourth Northern Expedition, when Zhuge Liang led Shu forces to attack Mount Qi, the Wei emperor Cao Rui decided to launch a counterattack on Shu, so he personally led his forces to Chang'an. He then ordered Sima Yi and Zhang He to lead 300,000 elite Wei soldiers from Yong and Liang provinces on a covert operation deep into Shu territory and launch a stealth attack on Jiange (劍閣; in present-day Jiange County, Sichuan), a strategic mountain pass. Around the time, Zhuge Liang had set up a rotating shift system, in which at any time 20 percent of his troops (about 80,000 men) would be stationed at Mount Qi, while the remaining 80 percent would remain behind. As the Wei forces approached Mount Qi and prepared to attack the Shu positions, Zhuge Liang's subordinates urged him to stop the rotating shift system and concentrate all the Shu forces together to resist the numerically superior Wei forces. Zhuge Liang replied, "When I lead the troops into battle, I operate on the basis of trust. Even the ancients felt it was a shame for one to betray others' trust in him in order to achieve his goals. The soldiers who are due to return home can pack up their belongings and prepare to leave. Their wives have been counting the days and looking forward to their husbands coming home. Even though we are in a difficult and dangerous situation now, we shouldn't break our earlier promise." When the homebound soldiers heard that they were allowed to go home, their morale shot up and they became more motivated to stay back and fight the Wei forces before going home. They talked among themselves and pledged to use their lives to repay Zhuge Liang's kindness. Later, during the battle, they fought fiercely and killed Zhang He and forced Sima Yi to retreat. Zhuge Liang won the battle because he successfully gained the trust of the Shu soldiers. (Note: Wang, Shu ji, quoting Guo Chong: "郭沖五事曰：魏明帝自征蜀，幸長安，遣宣王督張郃諸軍，雍、涼勁卒三十餘萬，潛軍密進，規向劒閣。亮時在祁山，旌旗利器，守在險要，十二更下，在者八万。時魏軍始陳，幡兵適交，參佐咸以賊衆彊盛，非力不制，宜權停下兵一月，以并聲勢。亮曰：「吾統武行師，以大信為本，得原失信，古人所惜；去者束裝以待期，妻子鶴望而計日，雖臨征難，義所不廢。」皆催遣令去。於是去者感恱，願留一戰，住者憤踊，思致死命。相謂曰：「諸葛公之恩，死猶不報也。」臨戰之日，莫不拔刃爭先，以一當十，殺張郃，却宣王，一戰大剋，此信之由也。" Cited in Chen and Pei 429, 35.926 n. 2.)

Pei Songzhi pointed out that this anecdote contradicted the accounts from historical records. During the fourth Northern Expedition, Cao Rui was indeed at Chang'an, but he did not personally lead Wei forces into battle. As for the part about Cao Rui ordering Sima Yi and Zhang He to lead a 300,000-strong army to attack Jiange, Pei Songzhi argued that it never happened because it was extremely unlikely for such a large army to pass through the Guanzhong region, bypass Zhuge Liang's position at Mount Qi, and enter Shu territory completely undetected. He also found the part about the rotating shift system untrue because it was impossible for a Shu expeditionary force to enter Wei territory and remain there for so long, much less set up a rotating shift system. (Note: Pei Songzhi, in Chen and Pei 429, 35.926 n. 2: "難曰：臣松之案：亮前出祁山，魏明帝身至長安耳，此年不復自來。且亮大軍在關、隴，魏人何由得越亮徑向劒閣？亮旣在戰場，本無乆駐之規，而方休兵還蜀，皆非經通之言。")

== Family and descendants ==
Zhuge family tree

Zhuge Feng 諸葛豐; Shaoji 少季
Cai Feng 蔡諷
Pang Degong 龐德公	Zhuge Gui 諸葛珪; Jungong 君貢	Huang Chengyan 黃承彥	Lady Cai (name unknown)
Zhang Zhao 張昭; Zibu 子布	Pang Shanmin 龐山民 (Note: When annotating the Book of the Later Han, Li Xian recorded Pang's courtesy name as "Shanren" (山人) to avoid the naming taboo of his grandfather Emperor Taizong of Tang (Li Shimin); see annotations for vol.83 of Houhanshu. Pang Shanmin's son Pang Huan (庞涣) served as Administrator of Zangke during the Taikang era (280-289) of the reign of Emperor Wu of Jin. (Note: Xi, Xiangyang Ji: (德公子山民，亦有令名，娶诸葛孔明小姊，为魏黄门吏部郎，早卒。子涣，字世文，晋太康中为牂牁太守。) Xiangyang Ji annotation in Sanguozhi, vol.37))	Lady Zhuge (name unknown)	Zhuge Jin 諸葛瑾; Ziyu 子瑜	Zhuge Jun 諸葛均	Zhuge Liang 諸葛亮; Kongming 孔明	Lady Huang (name unknown)	Lady Zhuge (name unknown)	Kuai Qi 蒯祺
Zhang Cheng 張承; Zhongsi 仲嗣	Lady Zhuge (name unknown)	Zhuge Qiao 諸葛喬; Bosong 伯松	Zhuge Ke 諸葛恪; Yuanxun 元遜	Zhuge Rong 諸葛融; Shuchang 叔長	Zhuge Guo* 諸葛果	Zhuge Huai* 諸葛懷	Zhuge Zhan 諸葛瞻; Siyuan 思遠
Zhuge Pan 諸葛攀
Zhuge Chuo 諸葛綽	Zhuge Song 諸葛竦	Zhuge Jian 諸葛建	Zhuge Shang 諸葛尚	Zhuge Jing 諸葛京; Xingzong 行宗	Zhuge Zhi* 諸葛質
Zhuge Xian 諸葛顯

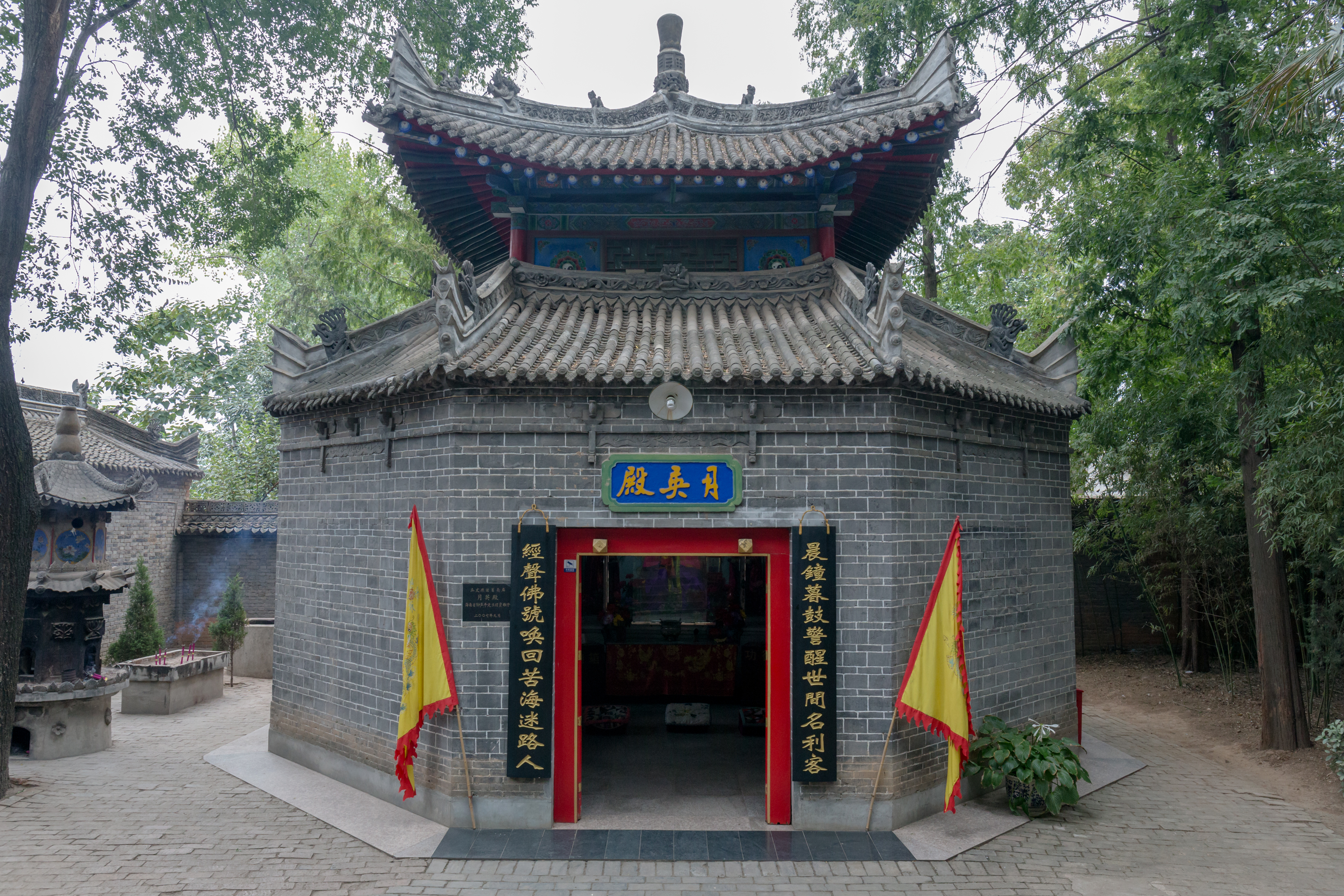
The Yueying Hall dedicated to Huang Yueying in the Temple of Marquis Wu, Wuzhang Plains

Spouse

Zhuge Liang married the daughter of Huang Chengyan, a reclusive scholar living south of the Han River. The Xiangyang Ji (襄陽記) recorded that Huang Chengyan once asked Zhuge Liang, "I heard you are looking for a wife. I have an ugly daughter with yellow hair and dark skin, but her talent matches yours." Zhuge Liang then married Huang Chengyan's daughter. At the time, there was a saying in their village: "Don't be like Kongming when you choose a wife. He ended up with [Huang Chengyan]'s ugly daughter." (Note: Xi, Xiangyang Ji: "黃承彥者，高爽開列，為沔南名士，謂諸葛孔明曰：「聞君擇婦；身有醜女，黃頭黑色，而才堪相配。」孔明許，即載送之。時人以為笑樂，鄉里為之諺曰：「莫作孔明擇婦，止得阿承醜女。」" Cited in Chen and Pei 429, 35.929 n. 2.) Although her name was not recorded in history, she is commonly referred to in popular culture by the name "Huang Yueying" (黃月英) and in fiction and folklore is called Lady Huang.

Children

- Zhuge Qiao (諸葛喬; 204–228), Zhuge Liang's nephew and adopted son. As Zhuge Liang initially had no son, he adopted Zhuge Qiao, the second son of his elder brother Zhuge Jin. Zhuge Qiao served as a military officer in Shu and died relatively early. (Note: Chen and Pei 429, 35.931)
- Zhuge Zhan (諸葛瞻; 227–263), Zhuge Liang's first son. He served as a military general in Shu and married a daughter of the Shu emperor Liu Shan. He was killed in battle in 263 during the Wei invasion of Shu. (Note: Chen and Pei 429, 35.932)
- Zhuge Huai (諸葛懷), Zhuge Liang's third son. He is mentioned only in the Zhuge Family Genealogy (諸葛氏譜) cited in the 1960 publication Collected Works of Zhuge Liang (諸葛亮集). In 269, during the Jin dynasty, Emperor Wu summoned the descendants of famous Han dynasty officials (e.g. Xiao He, Cao Shen) to the imperial court so that he could confer honorary titles on them. When Zhuge Liang's descendants did not show up, Emperor Wu sent his officials to find them. The officials found Zhuge Huai in Chengdu and brought him to Emperor Wu. Zhuge Huai declined the honour, saying that he was contented with the land and property he already owned at the time. Emperor Wu was pleased and he did not force Zhuge Huai to accept.
- Zhuge Guo (諸葛果), Zhuge Liang's daughter. She is mentioned only in the 1960 publication Collected Works of Zhuge Liang (諸葛亮集) and the Ming dynasty Daoist text Lidai Shenxian Tongjian (歷代神仙通鑑; Comprehensive Mirror on Immortals Through the Dynasties). Her father named her guo (果; "fulfil / realise", basic meaning "fruit / result") because he wanted her to learn Daoist magical arts and fulfil her destiny of becoming an immortal.

Grandchildren and great-grandchildren

- Zhuge Pan (諸葛攀), Zhuge Qiao's son. In 253, after Zhuge Ke (Zhuge Jin's first son) and his family were exterminated in a coup d'état in Eastern Wu, Zhuge Pan reverted from his adopted lineage (Zhuge Liang's) to his biological lineage (Zhuge Jin's) and went to Eastern Wu to continue Zhuge Jin's family line there. (Note: Chen and Pei 429, 35.931–932)
- Zhuge Shang (諸葛尚; died 263), Zhuge Zhan's eldest son. He was killed in battle in 263 alongside his father during the Wei invasion of Shu. (Note: Chen and Pei 429, 35.932)
- Zhuge Jing (諸葛京), Zhuge Zhan's second son. After the fall of Shu, he moved to Hedong Commandery in 264 together with Zhuge Pan's son, Zhuge Xian (諸葛顯), and later served as an official under the Jin dynasty after being summoned in c.April 269. (Note: Chen and Pei 429, 35.932) (Note: Jin Taishi qiju zhu: "詔曰：「諸葛亮在蜀，盡其心力，其子瞻臨難而死義，天下之善一也。」其孫京，隨才署吏，後為郿令。" Cited in Chen and Pei 429, 35.932 n. 2.) (Note: Book of Jin 648, vol. 3: "[泰始五年]二月，....己未，诏蜀相诸葛亮孙京随才署吏。" There was no ji'wei day in the 2nd month of the 5th year of the Tai'shi era; the month corresponds to 20 Mar to 18 Apr 269 in the Julian calendar.)
- Zhuge Zhi (諸葛質), a son of Zhuge Zhan. He is mentioned only in the Zaji (雜記) cited in the 1960 publication Collected Works of Zhuge Liang (諸葛亮集). After the fall of Shu, Liu Xun (劉恂; a son of Liu Shan) was unwilling to accompany his father to Luoyang, so he sent Zhuge Zhi as a messenger to meet Meng Qiu (孟虬), Meng Huo's son, and seek permission to live with the Nanman tribes. Meng Qiu approved.

Others

- Zhuge Dan (諸葛誕; died 258), a cousin of Zhuge Liang, served in Cao Wei as a high-ranking military general in the mid Three Kingdoms period. Between 257 and 258, he started a rebellion in Shouchun against the Wei regent Sima Zhao, but ended up being defeated and killed. (Note: Chen and Pei 429, 28.769–774, biography of Zhuge Dan)

== Appraisal and legacy ==
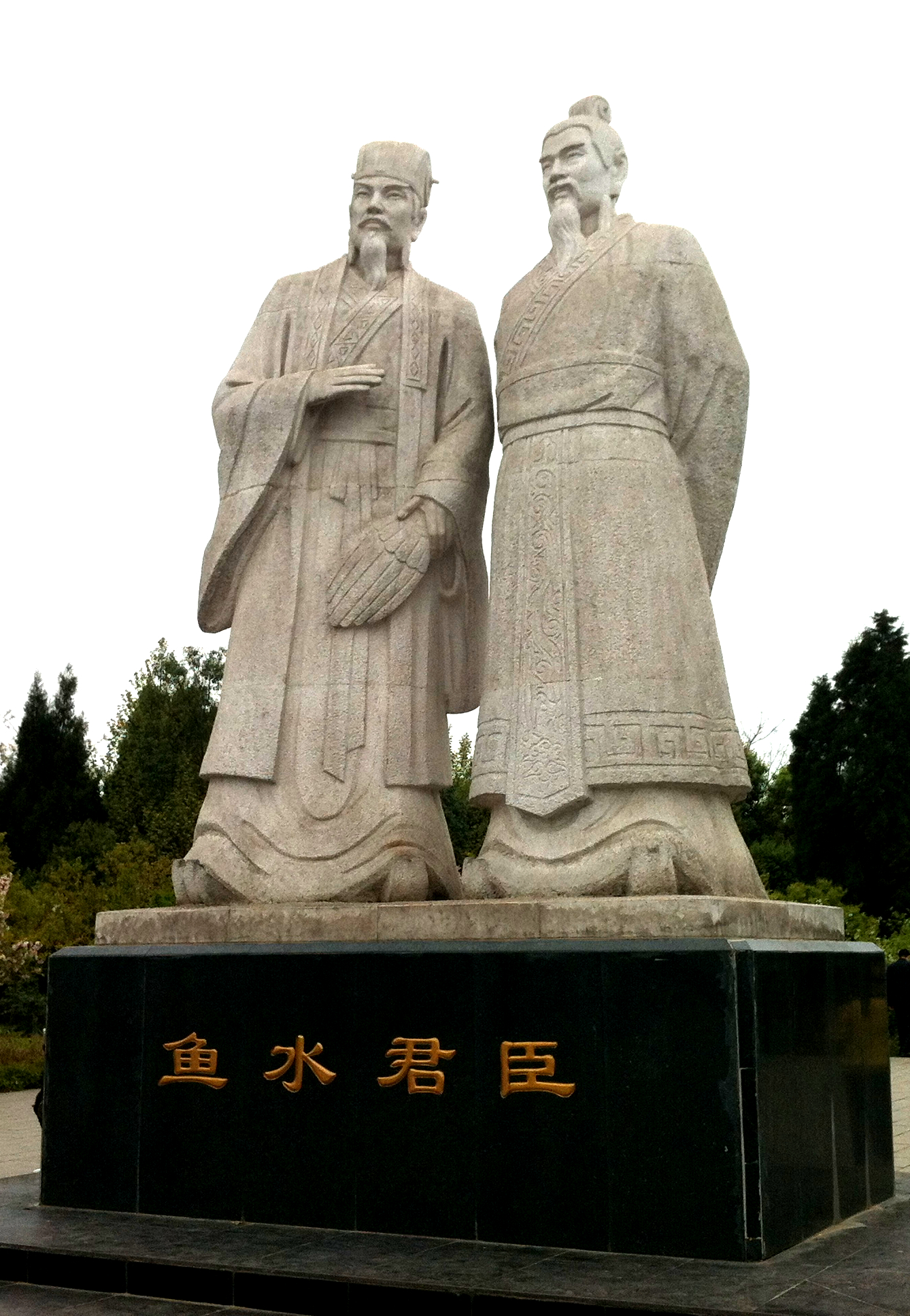
Statue of Liu Bei and Zhuge Liang, considered the ideal example of the loyalty, integrity and Ruist shared governance between a lord and minister in Chinese history (Note: "魚水君臣 ("Fish (and) water lord (and) subject") refers to the term "君臣魚水" from Records of the Three Kingdoms, where Liu Bei refers to gaining Zhuge Liang's service as if "a fish gaining water".)

=== Holding power as a regent ===
After Liu Bei's death, Liu Shan ascended to the throne of Shu Han. He granted Zhuge Liang the title "Marquis of Wu District" (武鄉侯) and created an office for him as a Chancellor. Not long later, Zhuge Liang was appointed Governor of Yi Province – the region which included most of Shu Han's territory.

Being both the Chancellor (directly managing the bureaucrat officers) and provincial governor (directly managing the common people) meant that both the magistrates and common people – all civil affairs in Yi Province – were in the hands of Zhuge Liang. Having an independent Chancellery Office with attached independent subordinates meant that Zhuge Liang's authority was relatively independent of the emperor's authority. In other words, just as attested in Sanguozhi, all of Shu Han's affairs, trivial or vital, were directly handled by Zhuge Liang, and the emperor Liu Shan was just a nominal leader. Moreover, the emperor himself was strictly educated and supervised by Zhuge Liang. This situation was maintained until Liang's death.

There are many attempts trying to explain why Zhuge Liang refused to return the authority to Liu Shan. Yi Zhongtian proposed three reasons:

1. Zhuge Liang supported the model of the emperor only indirectly lead the country and have a Chancellor to handle the affairs in his name, similar to the situation during the Western Han. In his opinion, if the emperor directly handled the affairs, then there would be no one to blame if problems occurred, but a Chancellor could bear responsibility and punishment for failure.
2. Zhuge Liang stubbornly thought that Liu Shan was not experienced enough to directly handle the state affairs, and considered it too important to risk error.
3. The situation of Shu Han was indeed very complicated at that time which required extremely well-planned solutions. An inexperienced Liu Shan could not handle such challenging problems, but Zhuge Liang could.

=== Economic reforms ===
Yi Province's wealthy families, unchecked by previous governors, freely exploited the common people and lived in extravagance. As a result, poverty was widespread, and economic–political reform was the most important concern for Zhuge Liang. A robust economic foundation was also necessary to enhance the people's loyalty to Shu Han regime and properly support the future expeditions against Cao Wei. Therefore, Zhuge Liang made it clear that the core value of his policy was to stabilise and improve the life of the people.

Zhuge Liang's new policies were enacted during the reign of Liu Bei and continued in the time of Liu Shan. He purged corrupt officials, reduced taxes, and restricted the aristocracy's abuse of power against the common people. Corvée labour and military mobilization were also reduced and rescheduled to avoid the disruption of agricultural activities, and Cao Cao's tuntian system of state-run agricultural colonies was implemented extensively to increase food production output. Agricultural dykes were significantly rebuilt and repaired, including the eponymous Zhuge dyke north of Chengdu. Thanks to the reforms, Shu Han agricultural production grew significantly, sufficient to sustain an active military.

Salt manufacture, silk production, and steelmaking – three major industries in Shu – also attracted Zhuge Liang's attention. Liu Bei, following the proposal of Zhuge Liang, created specialised bureaus for managing salt and steel manufacture, initially directed by Wang Lian and Zhang Yi, respectively. A specialised silk management bureau was also established, and silk production experienced significant growth, leading to Chengdu being nicknamed "the city of Silk". Over the lifetime of the Shu Han state, it accumulated 200,000 pieces of silk in the national treasury. Sanguozhi reported that salt production in Shu Han was highly prosperous and generated significant income to the government. Fu Yuan, a well-known local metalsmith, was appointed to a role in metallurgy research by Zhuge Liang, and managed to improve the techniques in crafting steel weapons for the Shu Han army.

Due to political turmoil, monetary systems at the end of the Han dynasty were in severe turbulence. When establishing themselves in the Yi Province, Liu Bei and Zhuge Liang, following the advice of Liu Ba, enacted successful monetary reforms. The new Shu Han currency was not only smoothly circulated within its borders, but also popular in the neighboring Jing province. Meanwhile, similar policies of Cao Pi, Cao Rui and Sun Quan were marred by difficulties and achieved limited success.

=== Legal and moral reforms ===
Zhuge Liang strongly supported the rule of law in Shu Han. Yi Zhongtian commented that "Rule of Laws" together with "Nominal rule of the Monarch and direct rule of the Chancellor" are two of Zhuge Liang's underappreciated contributions.

After Liu Bei took over Yi province, Zhuge Liang, together with Fa Zheng, Liu Ba, Li Yan and Yi Ji, wrote the legal codes for Shu Han. (Note: Chen and Pei 429, 38.971, biography of Yi Ji: "[伊籍]與諸葛亮、法正、劉巴、李嚴共造《蜀科》；《蜀科》之製，由此五人焉。")

In order to curb the corruption and attendant decadence of the local Yi aristocracy, Zhuge Liang enacted a Legalist policy with strict but fair and transparent laws, and restricted the power of wealthy families. Zhuge Liang was willing to punish high-ranked magistrates such as Li Yan, his own close associates such as Ma Su, and even willing to demote himself to keep legal order. However he also refrained from abusing punishment and required extreme caution in law enforcement. Xi Zuochi praised Zhuge Liang's policy of legal rule, that "since the era of Qin and Han there had been no one as equal." Even punished magistrates like Li Yan and Liao Li highly regarded Zhuge Liang and strongly believed that he would re-employ them after the punishment was enough. (Note: Chen and Pei 429, 40.1001 n. 2, biography of Li Yan: "諸葛亮又與平[i.e. Li Yan]子豐教曰：「吾與君父子戮力以獎漢室，此神明所聞，非但人知之也。表都護典漢中，委君於東關者，不與人議也。謂至心感動，終始可保，何圖中乖乎！昔楚卿屢絀，亦乃克復，思道則福，應自然之數也。原寬慰都護，勤追前闕。今雖解任，形業失故，奴婢賓客百數十人，君以中郎參軍居府，方之氣類，猶為上家。若都護思負一意，君與公琰推心從事者，否可複通，逝可複還也。詳思斯戒，明吾用心，臨書長嘆，涕泣而已。」")

Zhuge Liang also promoted moral conduct and himself led a strict and stoic life as a model. He did not own excessive assets, refrained from luxurious spending, and relied mainly on government salary. Shu Han's magistrates, like Deng Zhi, Fei Yi, Jiang Wei and Zhang Yi also followed suit, strictly abiding by the legal and moral codes, enabling the Shu government to maintain a high level of transparency and integrity. Yi Zhongtian praised Shu Han as the best model of "rational rule" amongst the Three Kingdoms, and it is the incorruptibility and transparency of Zhuge Liang and his associates that kept Shu Han from collapsing under a heavy burden of expenditure.

Not everybody was happy with such Legalist policies. Guo Chong's characterised Zhuge Liang's policy "cruel" and "exploitative", claiming "everybody from the noble to the commoner" was upset. Pei Songzhi disagreed with such comments, considering Zhuge Liang's law enforcement appropriate and rejecting claims of exploitation. (Note: Pei Songzhi, in Chen and Pei 429, 35.917 n. 1: "臣松之以為亮之異美，誠所願聞，然沖之所說，實皆可疑，謹隨事難之如左：其《一事》曰：亮刑法峻急，刻剝百姓，自君子小人咸懷怨歎，法正諫曰：「昔高祖入關，約法三章，秦民知德，今君假借威力，跨據一州，初有其國，未垂惠撫；且客主之義，宜相降下，願緩刑弛禁，以慰其望。」亮答曰；「君知其一，未知其二。秦以無道，政苛民怨，匹夫大呼，天下土崩，高祖因之，可以弘濟。劉璋暗弱，自焉已來有累世之恩，文法羈縻，互相承奉，德政不舉，威刑不肅。蜀土人士，專權自恣，君臣之道，漸以陵替；寵之以位，位極則賤，順之以恩，恩竭則慢。所以致弊，實由於此。吾今威之以法，法行則知恩，限之以爵，爵加則知榮；榮恩並濟，上下有節。為治之要，於斯而著。」") Guo Chong's perspective also contradicted Chen Shou's comment that "nobody was upset despite the strict laws". Yi Zhongtian commented that both contradictory assessments were correct, as Shu people were happy about Zhuge Liang's fairness and transparency, but some of them were also upset about his strictness. Moreover, Zhuge Liang's and Legalistic policies suppressed the local aristocracy, reducing their influence on politics and public opinion. For this reason, many of the local Shu intellegistia tacitly endorsed the invasion of Wei against Shu, although they also respected Zhuge Liang. This is supported by contemporary sources, including Zhang Wen (Note: Chen and Pei 429, 57.1330, biography of Zhang Wen: "權既陰銜溫稱美蜀政，又嫌其聲名大盛，眾庶炫惑，恐終不為己用，思有以中傷之。") and Sun Quan. Yuan Zhun of the Jin dynasty also highly appraised Zhuge Liang's administration skills and popularity. (Note: Yuan, Yuanzi: "亮之治蜀，田疇辟，倉廩實，器械利，蓄積饒，朝會不華，路無醉人。" Cited in Chen and Pei 429, 35.934–937 n. 1.)

Zhuge Liang is the point of reference for the proverb, "Three humble shoemakers together are as wise as Zhuge Liang." The expression highlights the value of collective intelligence.

=== Education and talent recruitment policy ===
Zhuge Liang greatly appreciated talent, hence he paid strong attention to education in order to cultivate and recruit more talented magistrates for the Shu Han government. He established the position Aide of Learning Encouragement (勸斈從事), held by many prominent local intelligentsia such as Qiao Zhou, who held this post for a very long time and was very influential. Chen Shou was one of his students. Later Zhuge Liang established a Great Education Residence (太斈府), a training facility using Confucian literature as textbooks. He also created many "reading book residences" both in Chengdu and in his encampments during the northern expeditions; such facilities functioned as places where talented people could be discovered and recruited. Yao Tian, Shu Han's governor of Guanghan district, managed to recommend many talented people to the government, to Zhuge Liang's lavish praise.

Zhuge Liang also established "Discussion Bureau" mechanism to gather all the discussions of a certain policy, encourage magistrates to accept the criticisms of their subordinates, and utilise the talents of all employees to reach the best decision. Zhuge Liang adopted a meritocratic promotion system, promoting and assessing people based on deeds and ability rather than fame or background.

=== Inventions ===
Zhuge Liang was believed to be the inventor of the Chinese steamed bun, the land mine and a mysterious but efficient automatic transportation device (initially used for grain) referred to as the "wooden ox and flowing horse" (木牛流馬), which is sometimes identified with the wheelbarrow.

Although he is often credited with the invention of the repeating crossbow that is named after him and called the "Zhuge Crossbow" (諸葛弩), this type of semi-automatic crossbow is an improved version of a model that first appeared during the Warring States period. There is debate over whether the original Warring States period bow was semi-automatic, or rather shot multiple bolts at once. Nevertheless, Zhuge Liang's improved model could shoot farther and faster.

Zhuge Liang is also credited with constructing the Stone Sentinel Maze, an array of stone piles that is said to produce supernatural phenomena, near Baidicheng. An early type of hot air balloon used for military signalling, known as the Kongming lantern, is also named after him. It was said to have been invented by Zhuge Liang when he was trapped by Sima Yi in Pingyang. Friendly forces nearby saw the message on the lantern paper covering and came to Zhuge Liang's aid. Another belief is that the lantern resembled Zhuge Liang's headdress, so it was named after him.

=== Literary works ===
Some books popularly attributed to Zhuge Liang can be found today, for example the Thirty-Six Stratagems and Mastering the Art of War (not to be confused with The Art of War attributed to Sun Tzu). Supposedly, his mastery of infantry and cavalry formation tactics based on the classic I Ching, was unrivalled. His memorial Chu Shi Biao, written prior to the Northern Expeditions, provided a salutary reflection of his unswerving loyalty to the state of Shu. The memorial moved some readers to tears. In addition, he wrote Admonition to His Son (諸葛亮誡子書) in which he reflected on his humility and frugality in pursuit of a meaningful life.

Zhuge is also the subject of many Chinese literary works. Poems by the prolific and highly regarded Tang dynasty poet Du Fu were written in memory of him, whose legacy of unwavering dedication seems to have been forgotten in Du's generation, judging by the description of Zhuge's neglected temple. Two such pieces were written as part of Du Fu's acclaimed "Kuizhou poems".

蜀相 （武侯祠）

丞相祠堂何處尋？
錦官城外柏森森。
映階碧草自春色，
隔葉黃鸝空好音。
三顧頻煩天下計，
兩朝開濟老臣心。
出師未捷身先死，
長使英雄淚滿襟。

Premier of Shu (Marquis of Wu's Temple)

Where to seek the temple of the noble Premier?
In the deep forests outside the City of Silk:
Such beautiful reflective scenery of spring,
And among the leaves the orioles sing.
Three visits brought him the weight of the world.
Two emperors he served with one heart.
But yet he failed to complete his quest before death.
That always makes heroes shed their tears like no other.

Another poem of Du Fu was also written to praise Zhuge Liang at his Baidicheng temple.

詠懷古蹟五首：五

諸葛大名垂宇宙，
宗臣遺像肅清高。
三分割據紆籌策，
萬古雲霄一羽毛。
伯仲之間見伊呂，
指揮若定失蕭曹。
運移漢祚終難復，
志決身殲軍務勞。

Five chants on cherishing merits of the ancients: number five

Zhuge's fame hangs before the universe
His noble statue is still there
Thirding the country with his wit
Floating above the mists of time like a feather
His power was equal to Yi and Lu
His wisdom was equal to Xiao and Cao
Fate changed and Han dynasty could hardly recover
Still he wholeheartedly fought on disregarding the challenges.

Du Fu's quatrain "Eightfold Battle Formation" (八陣圖) about Zhuge Liang's Stone Sentinel Maze, is collected in the Three Hundred Tang Poems.

=== Notable quotes ===
The phrase "Han and bandits do not stand together" (simplified Chinese: 汉贼不两立; traditional Chinese: 漢賊不兩立; pinyin: Hàn zéi bù liǎng lì) from the Later Chu Shi Biao is often used to draw a line in the sand and declare a situation where one cannot stand with evil. Notably, this phrase was President Chiang Kai-shek's favorite quote to invoke to justify his anti-communist ideology.

Another phrase "deference and prudence, to a state of depletion, are never finished until death" (鞠躬尽瘁，死而后已; 鞠躬盡瘁，死而後已; jū gōng jìn cuì, sǐ ér hòu yǐ) from the Later Chu Shi Biao is often used to describe commitment and perseverance to strive to the utmost.

One famous line of poetry, "Who is the first, awakened from the Great Dream? As always, I'm the one who knows." (大梦谁先觉？平生我自知.; 大夢誰先覺？平生我自知.; dà mèng shuí xiān jué ? píng shēng wǒ zì zhī), was also attributed to Zhuge Liang.

== In Romance of the Three Kingdoms ==
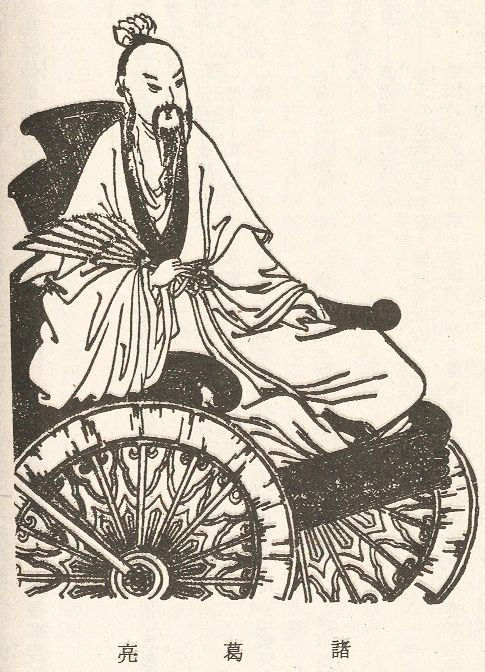
A Qing depiction of Zhuge Liang

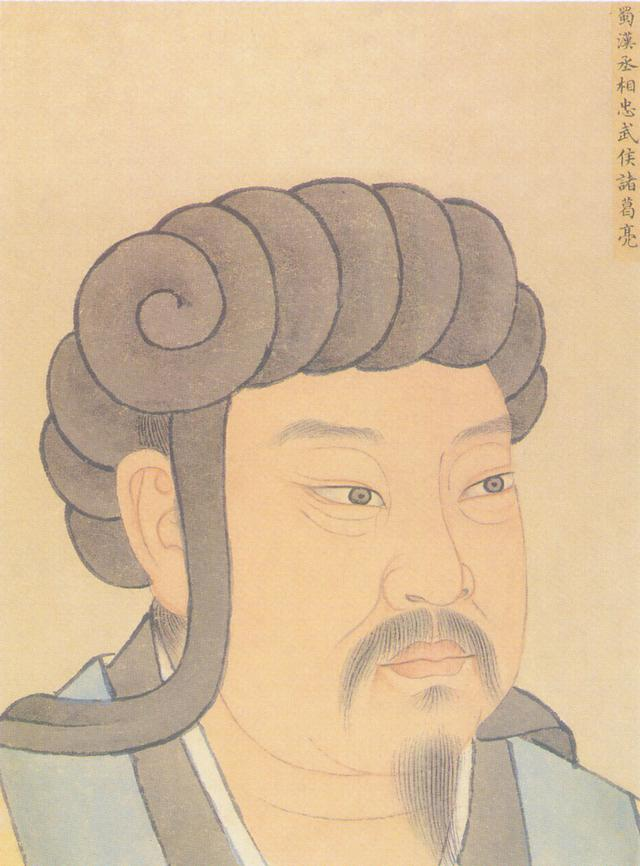
Qing dynasty illustration of Zhuge Liang

The 14th-century historical novel Romance of the Three Kingdoms by Luo Guanzhong romanticises the historical figures and events before and during the Three Kingdoms period. In the novel Zhuge Liang is characterised as a strategist of legendary brilliance and fantastical abilities such as summoning advantageous winds and devising magical stone mazes.

There is great confusion on whether the stories are historical or fictional. At minimum the Empty Fort Strategy is based on historical records, albeit not originally attributed to Zhuge Liang. In Chinese culture, the question is largely irrelevant, as Zhuge Liang is an archetypal mastermind whose stratagems continue to influence Chinese society. Together with Sun Tzu's The Art of War, the legends of Zhuge Liang underlie much of modern Chinese strategic thinking, both military and civilian.

In Moss Roberts's translation of the novel, Zhuge Liang's appearance is described as follows:

Kongming appeared singularly tall, with a face like gleaming jade and a plaited silken band around his head. Cloaked in crane down, he had the buoyant air of a spiritual transcendent.

In the original Chinese, he wears a guanjin (綸巾) hat, and a hechang (鶴氅) robe associated with Daoists.

See the following for the stories in Romance of the Three Kingdoms involving Zhuge Liang.

- Battle of Bowang, where Zhuge Liang first makes his name as a commander under Liu Bei using fire as a weapon
- Zhuge Liang's diplomatic mission to Jiangdong
- Borrowing arrows with straw boats, in which decoy boats stuffed with straw are used to steal thousands of arrows from Cao Cao's archers. In earlier versions of this story, Sun Quan or Zhou Yu takes the role of protagonist later given to Zhuge Liang.
- Zhuge Liang prays for the eastern wind, where the wind that fans the flames destroying Cao Cao's fleet at Red Cliffs is due to Zhuge Liang's magic spell
- Meng Huo captured and released seven times, a further embellishment upon the story transmitted in Xi Zuochi's work

=== Events before Zhuge Liang's death ===
When Zhuge Liang fell critically ill during the Battle of Wuzhang Plains, he attempted a ritual to extend his lifespan by twelve years. However, he failed when the ritual was disrupted by Wei Yan, who rushed in to warn him about the enemy's advance. Before his death, Zhuge Liang also passed his 24 Volumes on Military Strategy (兵法二十四篇) to Jiang Wei, who would continue his legacy and lead another eleven campaigns against the Cao Wei state.

== Worship of Zhuge Liang ==
There are many temples and shrines built to commemorate Zhuge Liang, which are commonly called Temple of the Marquis of Wu (武侯祠). Some of the most famous ones include the Temple of the Marquis of Wu in Chengdu, and the Temple of the Marquis of Wu in Baidicheng.

Zhuge Liang is also sometimes venerated as a door god at Chinese and Taoist temples, usually in partnership with Sima Yi of Wei.

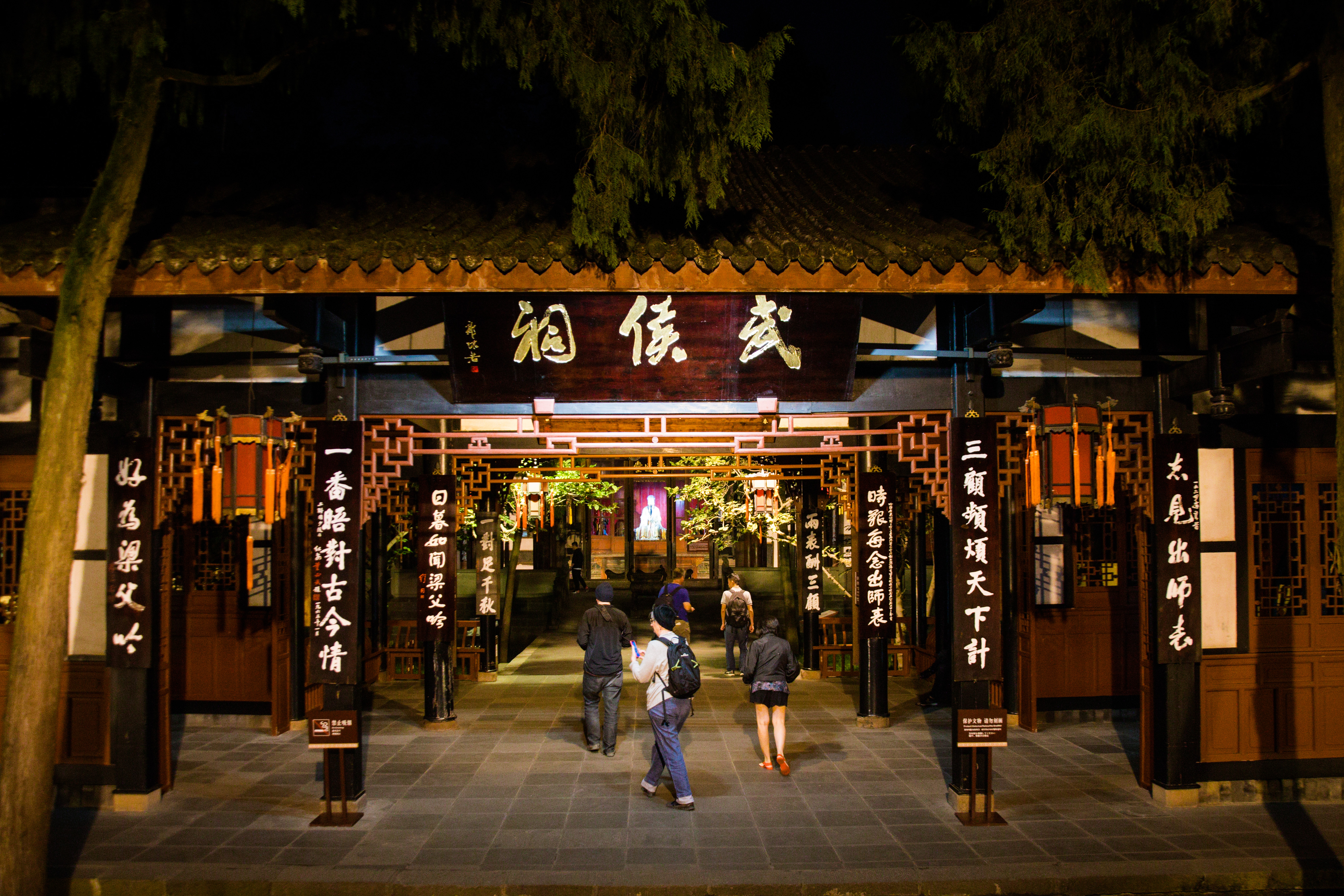
Temple of the Marquis of Wu in Chengdu, Sichuan

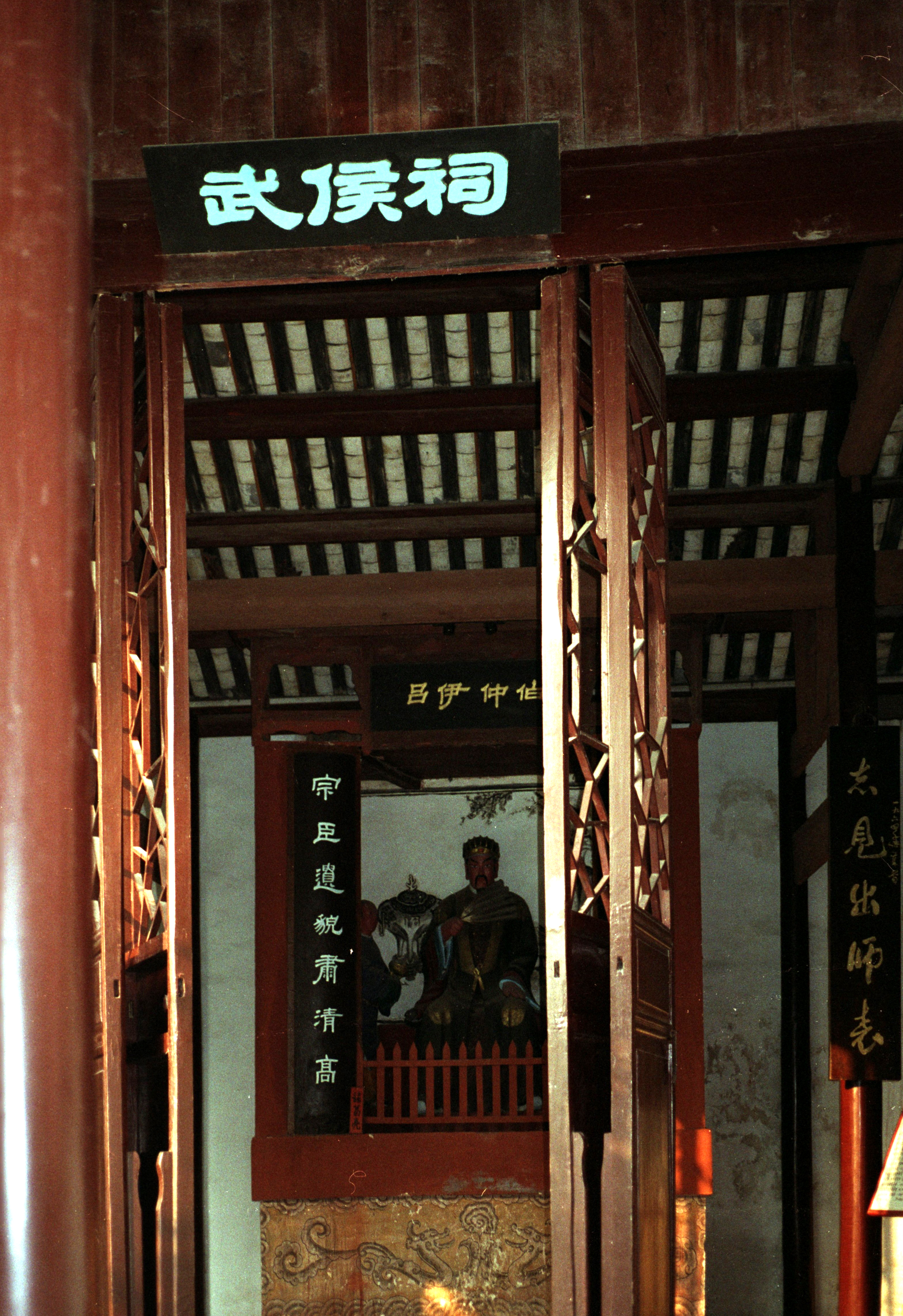
Temple of the Marquis of Wu in Baidicheng, Fengjie, Chongqing

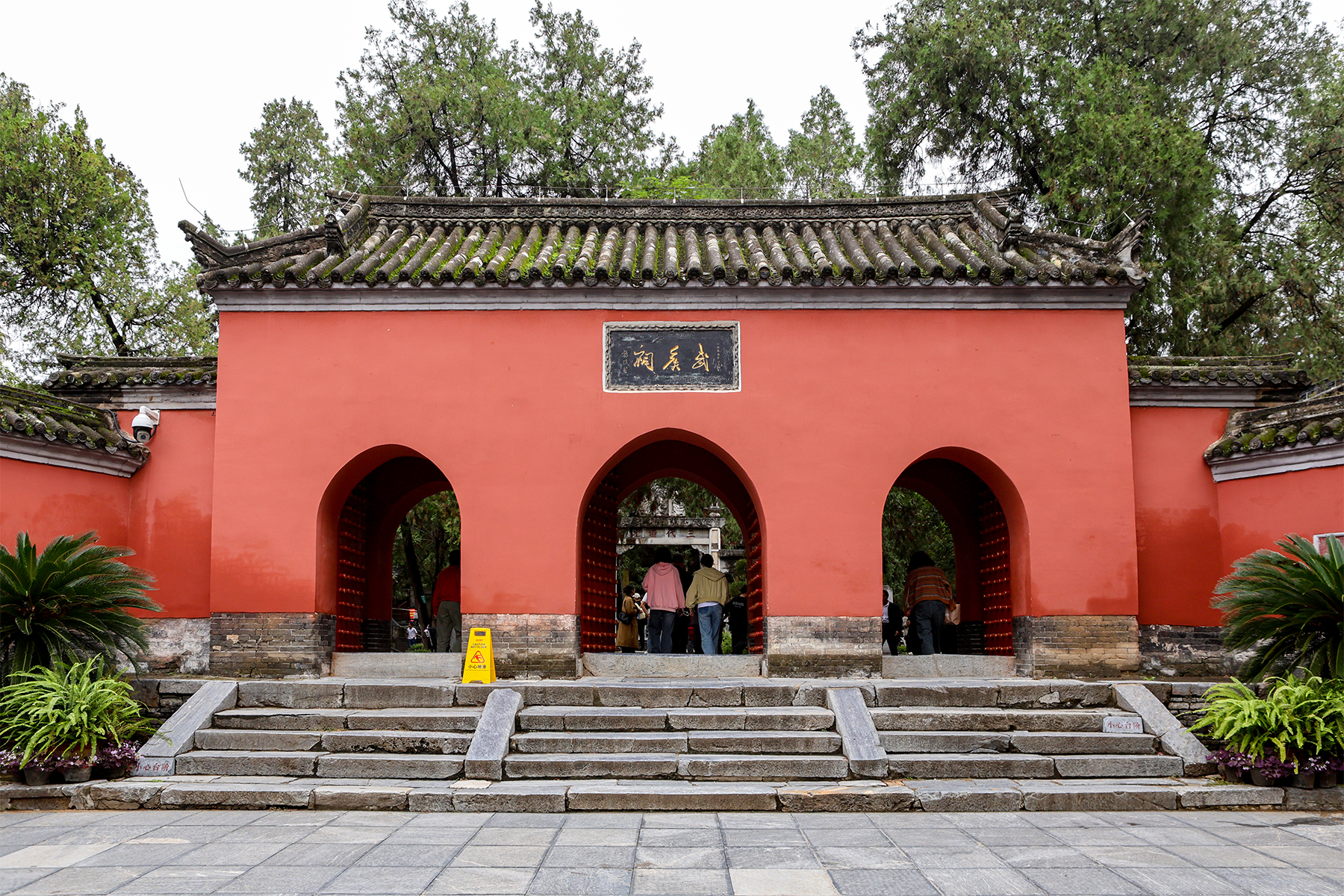
Temple of the Marquis of Wu in Zhuge Liang's hometown at Nanyang, Henan

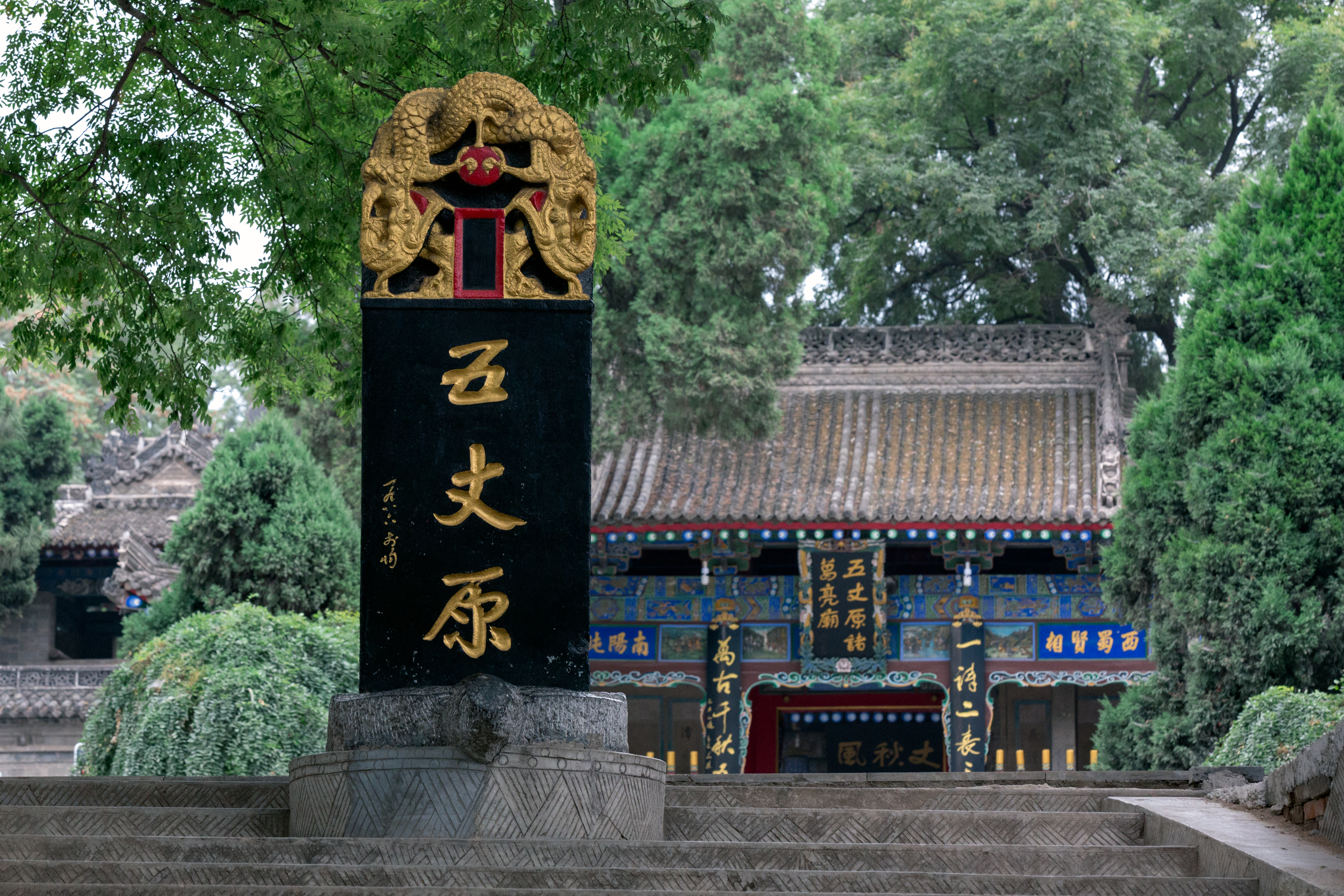
The Temple of Marquis Wu in Wuzhang Plains, Qishan, Shaanxi

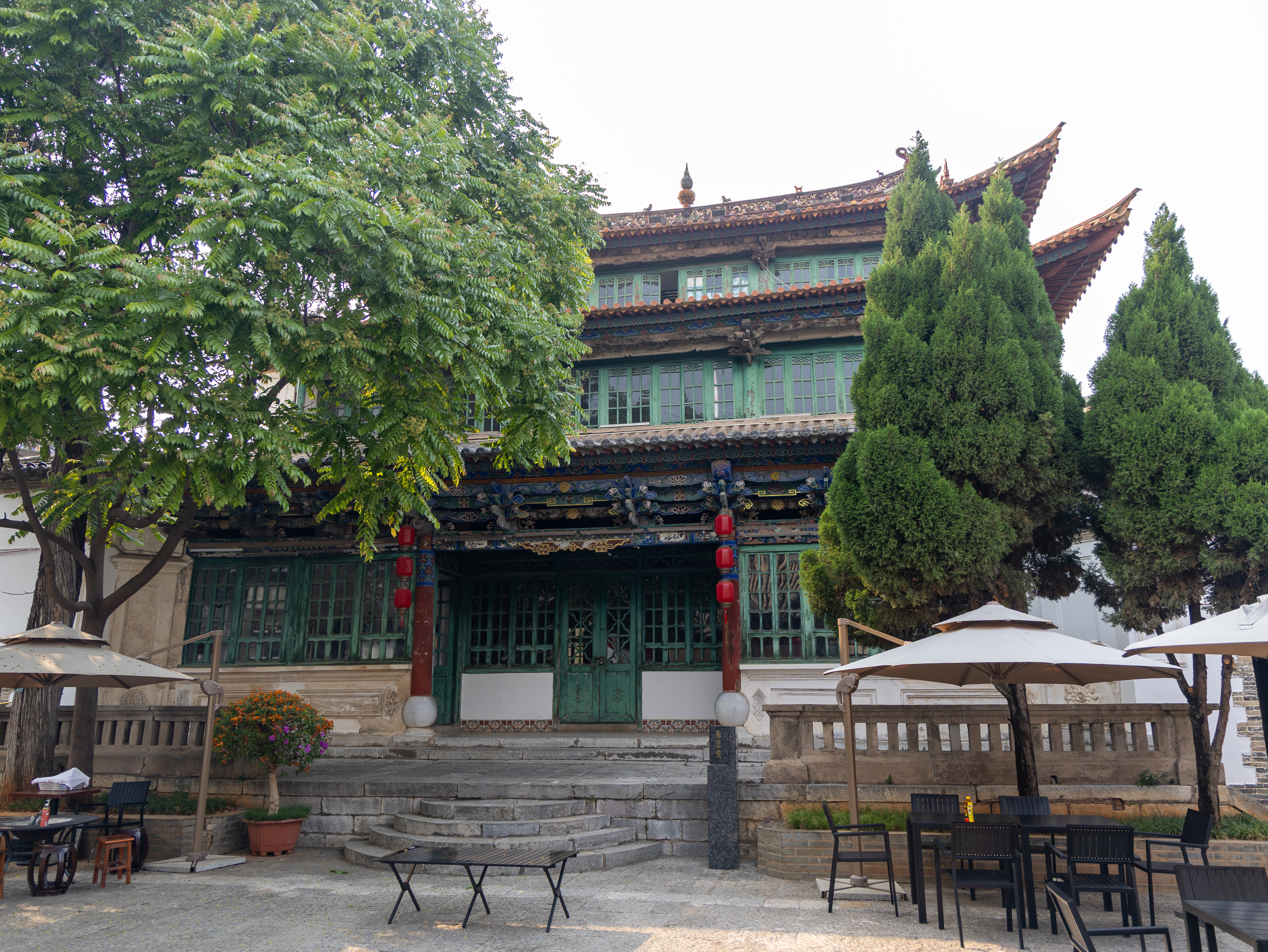
The Temple of Marquis Wu in Jianshui, Yunnan

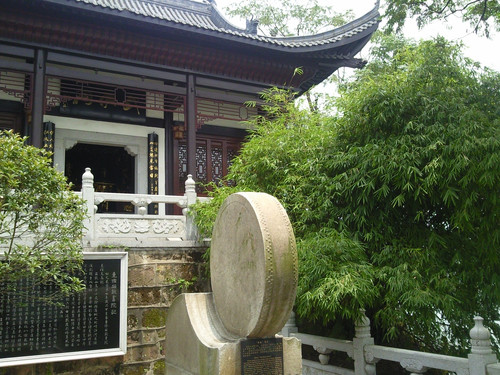
The Temple of Marquis Wu in Shigu, Hunan

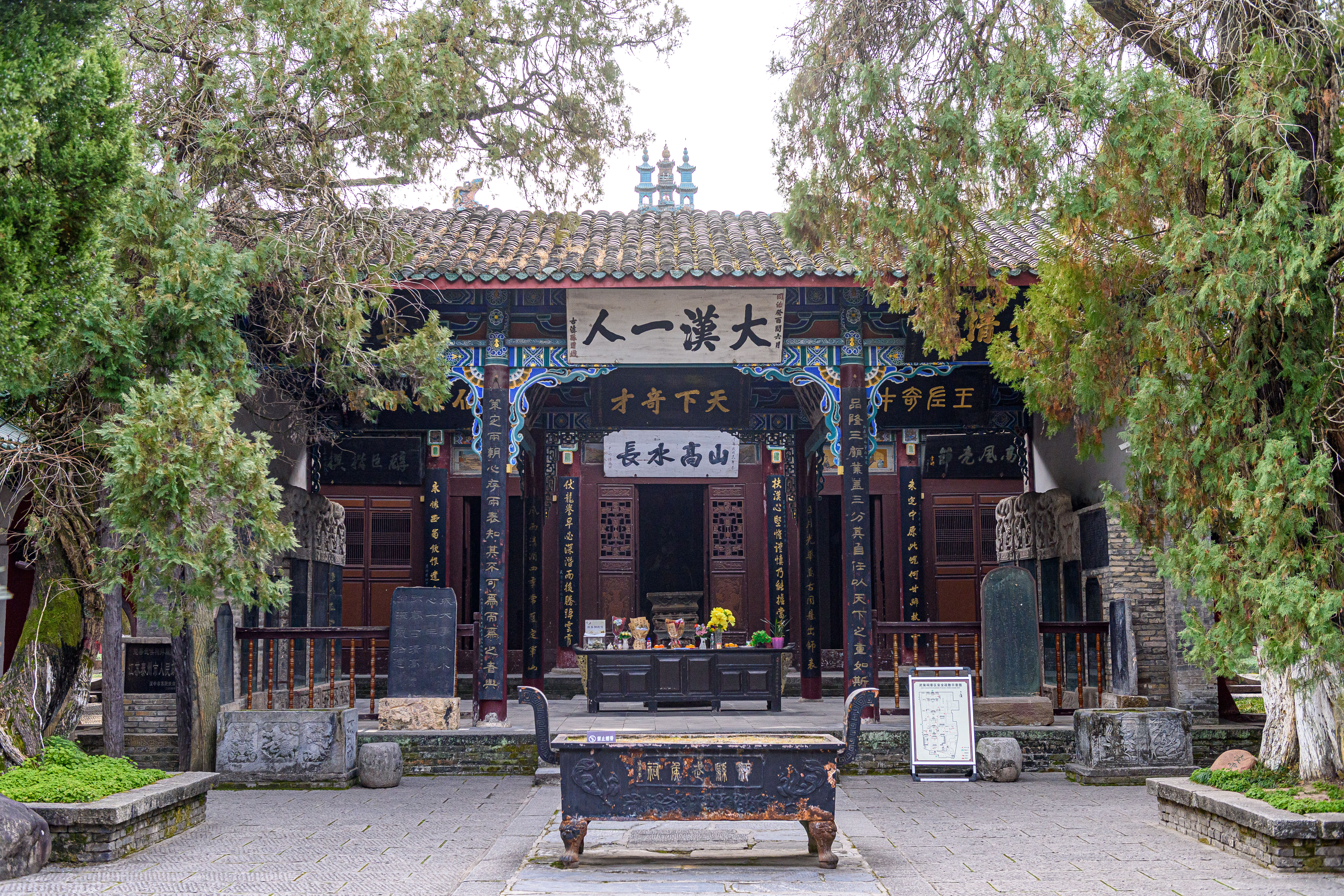
The Temple of Marquis Wu in Mian, Shaanxi

== In popular culture ==
Zhuge Liang is often depicted wearing a Taoist robe and holding a hand fan made of crane feathers. Zhuge Liang is remembered in modern popular culture through his character in Romance of the Three Kingdoms and his presence in modern films, TV, and games.

=== Film and television ===
Notable actors who have portrayed Zhuge Liang in film and television include:

- Adam Cheng in The Legendary Prime Minister – Zhuge Liang (1985)
- Li Fazeng in Zhuge Liang (1985)
- Tang Guoqiang in Romance of the Three Kingdoms (1994)
- Pu Cunxin in Three Kingdoms: Resurrection of the Dragon (2008)
- Takeshi Kaneshiro in Red Cliff (2008–09)
- Lu Yi in Three Kingdoms (2010)
- Raymond Lam in Three Kingdoms RPG (2012)
- Wang Luoyong in The Advisors Alliance (2017)
- Mukai Osamu in Paripi Komei (2023)

=== Video games ===
Zhuge Liang appears as a playable character in various video games based on the 14th-century historical novel Romance of the Three Kingdoms, most notably Koei Tecmo's Dynasty Warriors series, Romance of the Three Kingdoms series, Warriors Orochi series, Dynasty Tactics series, Kessen II and Sangokushi Koumeiden. He also appears in other games such as Capcom's Destiny of an Emperor, Firaxis Games's Civilization IV and Civilization V, Level-5's Inazuma Eleven GO 2: Chrono Stone, as well as Destiny of Spirits and the mobile games Puzzle & Dragons and Fate/Grand Order.

=== Card games ===
In the collectible card game Magic: The Gathering, there is a card named Kongming, "Sleeping Dragon" in the Portal Three Kingdoms and Commander (2013 Edition) sets.

Zhuge Liang is also featured in the Qun Xiong Zheng Ba (群雄争霸) and Ao Shi Tian Xia (傲视天下) sets of the collectible card game Generals Order.

Zhuge Liang is also a main character in the card game Legends of the Three Kingdoms.

=== Comics ===
The young Zhuge Liang is a member of the League of Infinity in the superhero pastiche Supreme by Alan Moore.

In the manhwa Faeries' Landing, the protagonist of the story is a high school student named Ryang Jegal, whose life is turned upside-down by a fairy and her heavenly (and not-so-heavenly) peers. Ryang Jegal, or Jegal Ryang in the proper Asian sequence, is the Korean translation of "Zhuge Liang".

In the Japanese manga and anime series Ya Boy Kongming!, Zhuge Liang is reincarnated in present-day Japan and applies his strategic skills in the music industry.

== See also ==
- Lists of people of the Three Kingdoms
- Wolonggang
- Zhuge Village
