= Tufa Shujineng's Rebellion =

Tribal rebellion against the Western Jin (270 - early 280)

Date	c.July 270 (Note: Vol.79 of Zizhi Tongjian recorded that Hu Lie was killed on 9 Jul 270 in the Julian calendar.) – January or February 280
Location	Gansu and Xinjiang, China
Result	Western Jin victory

Belligerents
Western Jin	Xianbei, Qiang, Di and other tribal rebels Rebels in Dunhuang Commandery

Commanders and leaders
Hu Lie †; Su Yu; Shi Jian; Qian Hong †; Sima Jun; Wen Yang; Ma Xun; Yang Xin †; Ma Long	Tufa Shujineng †; Various tribal leaders Linghu Feng; Linghu Hong †

Strength
3,500 (Ma Long)	200,000+

Tufa Shujineng's Rebellion, also known as the Qin and Liang Provinces Rebellion (Chinese: 秦涼之變), was a tribal rebellion against the Western Jin dynasty from June or July 270 to early 280 during the Three Kingdoms period. It was led by the Xianbei chieftain Tufa Shujineng, who was joined by several tribal ethnic groups such as the Qiang and Di living in northwestern China. The rebellion lasted nearly a decade and reached its peak in 279 when rebel forces captured Liang province. However, the end of that same year would also see its end as Jin forces decisively defeated Shujineng and pacified the tribes.

== Background ==
During the Western Jin dynasty, northwestern China was home to various tribal ethnic groups. The neighbouring Qiang people to the west had been migrating inwards into the Longxi and Guanzhong regions as early as the Western Han dynasty, where they would often rebel due to oppressive policies by the local Han governors. The Di people, despite their relatively stable relations with the Han dynasty, also began rebelling with the Qiang during the fall of Han, and in 219, the statesman, Cao Cao, had 50,000 of them relocated from Wudu Commandery to live along the Wei River in the Guanzhong. Descendants of the Xiongnu such as the Lushuihu and Xiutu also resided in the northwest.

At the time, the Xianbei tribes of the northern steppe were migrating southward into the Chinese interior. Many of them were able to easily cross into and roam the Hexi Corridor, where one tribe, the Tufa, began asserting considerable influence within the region. Sometime between 256 and 263, the Cao Wei general, Deng Ai received the surrender of tens of thousands of Xianbei people from the Hexi, resettling them in the areas between Liang and Yong provinces.

In 268, parts of northern China were hit by floods and droughts, and the minister, Fu Xuan feared that the tribes in the northwest –particularly the Xianbei– would rebel. He proposed that the Inspector of Qin province, Hu Lie be tasked in quelling a future revolt due to his reputation in the west. However, he was still concerned that even if Hu Lie defeated the rebels, they could easily escape to the commanderies of Anding or Wuwei (武威郡; in present-day Jingyuan County, Gansu), so he also suggested setting up a new commandery around Gaopingchuan (高平川; in present-day Guyuan, Ningxia), where settlers would be recruited and supplemented with corvée exemptions. The commandery, along with Anding and Wuwei, would be transferred to Qin under Hu Lie. Fu Xuan also suggested opening a new northbound passage to encourage migration and gradually strengthen their hold on the border.

One minister, Chen Qian warned against appointing Hu Lie and another general, Qian Hong, as provincial inspectors. He argued that while the two were strong generals, they were both tactless and not suited to maintain order around the borders. However, his advice was ignored.

== The rebellion ==
=== Early rebel success ===
A rebellion soon broke out in Qin in June or July 270 after Hu Lie lost the support of the tribes. The rebellion's leader was Tufa Shujineng, the chieftain of the Tufa tribe in Hexi. Although Shujineng was a Xianbei, historical records indicate that the rebellion consisted of several different tribal people, with the rebels being collectively referred to as "Qiang" or "Di".

Hu Lie led his troops and camped at Wanhu Mound (萬斛堆; located in Gaolan County, Gansu) to campaign against Shujineng. However, Shujineng and the chieftains, Baihuwen (白虎文) and Yaolanni (藥蘭泥), surrounded Hu Lie's army and killed him. The Prince of Fufeng, Sima Liang, was supposed to send reinforcements to help Hu Lie through his subordinates Liu Qi (劉旂) and Jing Yan (敬琰), but the two refused to move their troops. Emperor Wu wanted to punish Liu Qi, but Sima Liang defended him and lost his post in the process. Later, the Inspector of Liang, Su Yu (son of Su Ze), led forces who were also routed by Shujineng at Mount Jin (金山; located in Shandan county, Gansu); Su himself may have been killed as well.

With the removal of Sima Liang, Emperor Wu sent the General Who Maintains the West, Shi Jian (石鑒) and Protector-General of Vehement Might, Tian Zheng (田章) to put down the revolt. Shi Jian ordered his subordinate, Du Yu, to attack Shujineng. However, Du Yu protested, stating that the enemies were still in high spirits after their recent victories, as opposed to the demoralized Jin troops. He instead suggested that they wait until the following spring to attack, building up strength and storing up grains in the meantime. Shi Jian thought that Du Yu was trying to jeopardize the campaign, so he had Du Yu sent back to Luoyang in a prison cart for him to face the Minister of Justice. Shi Jian then carried out his original plans, but he could not defeat Shujineng. On 27 August 270, Sima Jun (司马骏), Prince of Ruyin and Sima Liang's younger brother, was appointed Grand General Who Guards The West and Chief Controller of Yong, Liang and the other western provinces, and he was tasked with protecting the Guanzhong.

In April or May 271, Shujineng was joined by the tribes of Beidi (北地; in present-day Qingyang, Gansu) in his invasion of Jincheng (金城; around present-day Yuzhong County, Gansu). The Inspector of Liang, Qian Hong, led his troops to fight Shujineng's forces, but the Qiang troops within Qian's army, dissatisfied by his mistreatment of them, rebelled and join Shujineng. Shujineng, Baihuwen and Yaolanni defeated and killed Qian Hong at Mount Qing (青山; located in Huan county, Gansu) after surrounding his army. Yang Xin was then made the new Inspector of Liang.

In 272, the Administrator of Dunhuang, Yin Qu (尹璩), died. Yang Xin petitioned that the Prefect of Dunhuang, Liang Cheng (梁澄), succeed to Yin Qu's office. However, an Officer of Merit, Song Zhi (宋質), deposed Liang Cheng and replaced him with the consultant, Linghu Feng (令狐豐). Yang Xin led his soldiers to campaign against Linghu Feng, but he was defeated by Song Zhi's army.

Previously, Deng Ai had repaired parapets and built many forts in Liang and Yong provinces for defensive purposes during his time. After Shujineng's rebellion broke out, many officials and local residents took refuge in these forts.

=== Reactions in Jin court ===
The rebellion in Qin and Liang caused much worry for Emperor Wu. In 271, two of his ministers, Ren Kai (任愷) and Yu Chun (庾純), attempted to undermine their political enemy, Jia Chong, by recommending to Emperor Wu that he be sent to lead the fight against Shujineng. Emperor Wu agreed and even issued an edict appointing Jia Chong to the necessary positions. Jia Chong was distressed by Emperor Wu's decision, but with Xun Xu's help, he was able to remain in Luoyang after securing a marriage between his daughter, Jia Nanfeng, and Emperor Wu's heir, Sima Zhong. When the general, Yang Hu, submitted his petition advocating for the invasion of Jin's rival state, Eastern Wu, he was strongly opposed by many other ministers, who argued that quelling the rebellion in Qin and Liang should be of greater priority.

=== Jin counterattack ===
After the failed attempts at quelling the rebellion, Sima Jun focused his soldiers on agriculture in Guanzhong. In September or October 274, rebels from Liang attacked Jincheng again, but Sima Jun defeated them and killed one of their leaders, Qiwenni (乞文泥). In 275, he campaigned against Shujineng and defeated his forces, killing 3,000 rebels. Later that year, when Sima Jun was ordered to lead 7,000 soldiers to strengthen the garrison in Liang, Shujineng, Houdanbo (侯彈勃) and their followers planned to raid the military-agricultural colonies in Guanzhong in his absence. However, his subordinate, Wen Yang, led a combined force from Liang, Qin and Yong to threaten the rebels. Shujineng sent Houdanbo and twenty tribesmen to submit to Jin, each sending their sons as hostages. Wen Yang also received the surrender of 200,000 tribal people from Anding, Beidi and Jincheng including the chieftains Jikeluo (吉軻羅), Houjinduo (侯金多) and Rejiong (熱冏). Meanwhile, around July, the Wu and Ji Colonel, Ma Xun (馬循), who was based in the Western Regions, campaigned against Xianbei rebels and killed their leader.

In the spring of 276, Linghu Feng died and was succeeded by his younger brother, Linghu Hong (令狐宏). Yang Xin launched another attack on Dunhuang, and this time, he killed Linghu Hong and recaptured the commandery. Afterwards, around June, Sima Jun campaigned against the northern "Hu" (北胡) and killed one of their leaders, Tudun (吐敦). Later around August, a Xianbei leader, Aluoduo (阿羅多) attacked the Jin border. Ma Xun commanded his troops to defeat him, killing 4,000 and capturing 9,000 of them, which prompted Aluoduo to surrender. About four months later, around December, Sima Jun was promoted to Senior General Who Attacks the West.

=== Battle of Liang Province ===
==== Fall of Liang province ====
Peace between the Jin and Shujineng did not last, as Shujineng and the tribes revolted again in 277. He initially suffered another defeat to Wen Yang, but later that year, Sima Jun was recalled to the capital and replaced with Sima Tai (司馬泰) (Note: father of Sima Yue) in Guanzhong. By 278, Yang Xin would also lose the tribes' support. That year, he fought with Ruoluobaneng (若羅拔能) and others on the Dang Ranges (丹嶺) in Wuwei, but was defeated and beheaded. As Shujineng continued to harass Jin's borders, the Jin minister Li Xi (李憙) suggested that they send an army to defeat Shujineng, but the emperor's advisers disagreed, believing the situation was not as serious as Li thought. However, by around February 279, Shujineng captured Liang. Emperor Wu regretted the situation to the point that records claim he was unable to eat until late in the evening.

==== Jin preparations ====
The emperor's advisers initially considered sending the Jin general of Xiongnu ethnicity, Liu Yuan, to recapture the province, but decided not to out of fear that he would also rebel. Instead, a junior Jin general by the name of Ma Long volunteered to lead a Jin army and defeat Shujineng. Emperor Wu agreed and appointed him Protector-General Who Campaigns Against The Caitiffs and Administrator of Wuwei, despite objections from his minister. Before the campaign, Ma Long sought out around 3,000 strong men who were able to draw bows that were four juns (Note: approximately 26 kg (57 lb)) and use 'waist-spun crossbows' (腰引弩) that were 36 juns (Note: approximately 238 kg (525 lb)). In the end, he was able to find 3,500 men, and he had them practice their accuracy by shooting targets. Ma Long then requested and received fresh military supplies that would last him up to three years.

==== Ma Long's tactics ====
In November 279, Ma Long set out west to fight the rebels. After the Jin troops crossed the Wen River (溫水; east of present-day Jingyuan County, Gansu), Shujineng responded by having tens of thousands of his rebels occupy the passes to block Ma Long's front, while the others set up ambushes to intercept his rear.

During his battles with Shujineng, Ma Long employed a number of unorthodox tactics. In accordance with Zhuge Liang's 'Eightfold Battle Formations' (八陣圖), Ma Long built 'flat box carts' (偏箱車; a cart with a board on one side which acts like a shield) for his soldiers to use. When fighting in the open, he employed 'deer-antlered carts' (鹿角車; a cart with spears and halberds on the front, giving it an antler-like shape), and when passing through narrow roads, he built wooden roofs over the carts. His soldiers were able to move while fighting, and the enemy arrows were unable to hit them. More questionably, another tactic that Ma Long used was placing down large amounts of 'magnetic stones' on the ground to slow down the enemy advances, the reason being that the rebels and their horses often wore iron armor while his men wore armor made of rhinoceros hides. The rebels were taken by surprise and thought the Jin soldiers were divine beings.

==== End of the rebellion ====
While Ma Long fought in the west, a rumour began circulating in the court that he and his men had been cut off, but it was quickly dispelled after his messenger arrived at the court. Emperor Wu was pleased with Ma Long and further appointed him General Who Exhibits Might. As Ma Long marched to Wuwei, his troops killed and injured many of the rebels. After reaching Wuwei, Shujineng's allied chieftains, Cubahan (猝跋韓) and Zuwanneng (且萬能), surrendered to him along with ten thousand troops under them. In December 279, Ma Long, with the help of Meiguneng (沒骨能) and other friendly tribal leaders, won a great battle over Shujineng and killed him. Another account states that after Shujineng was defeated, he was assassinated by his subordinates, who then submitted to Ma Long. Tufa Shujineng's rebellion was at its end.

== Aftermath ==
As Shujineng's defeat became assured, Emperor Wu began his conquest of Wu one month before the rebellion was quelled and unified China in May 280. Shujineng's cousin, Tufa Wuwan (禿髮務丸), was installed as the new chieftain of the Tufa. Despite their victory, Shujineng's rebellion, along with another albeit minor tribal revolt in Bing province led by Liu Meng in 272, raised concerns among a few ministers regarding the ethnic minorities living in the north. After the conquest, the minister, Guo Qin (郭欽) sent a petition to the court calling for the tribes to be relocated outside the border, but was rejected.

For the remainder of Emperor Wu's reign, the northwest remained mostly in peace. However, in 296, during the reign of Emperor Hui, due to poor governance, the tribes, led by the Di chieftain, Qi Wannian, once again rebelled in Guanzhong, this time with more dire consequences that contributed towards the upheaval of the Five Barbarians. Jia Nanfeng's marriage to Sima Zhong, prompted by Shujineng's rebellion, also laid the seeds for the War of the Eight Princes.
