= Hu Lie =

Cao Wei and Western Jin official (died July 270)

Hu Lie (胡烈; died 9 July 270), courtesy name Xuanwu (玄武) (Note: per a Jin Zhugong Zan annotation in Zhong Hui's biography in vol.28 of Sanguozhi. Jin Zhugong Zan also recorded his brother Hu Fen's courtesy name as "Xuanwei", which matches the record in the latter's biography in Jin Shu.) or Wuxuan (武玄), (Note: per Hu Fen's biography in vol.57 of Book of Jin) was a Chinese official of the state of Cao Wei during the Three Kingdoms period of China, and its successor state, Western Jin. Serving under Sima Zhao and his son Sima Yan, Hu was best known for taking part in Cao Wei's invasion of Shu, where he joined Zhong Hui in slandering Deng Ai and later played a vital role in stopping Zhong's mutiny, and his death in Tufa Shujineng's rebellion.

== Background ==
Hu Lie was from Anding Commandery. He was a younger brother of Hu Fen (胡奋; died March or April 288), and a son of Hu Zun (胡遵; died 12 August 256); Hu Fen and Hu Zun were also officials of Cao Wei. (Note: Of the trio, only Hu Fen had his own biography in vol.57 of Book of Jin.) Hu Zun had a total of six sons; among them, Hu Guang (胡广), Hu Zun and Hu Lie were the more famous ones.

== Service under Cao Wei ==
During Zhuge Dan's rebellion, Hu Lie, as Administrator of Tai Shan, led 5,000 men to launch a sneak attack on Zhu Yi's baggage train and managed to burn down Zhu's supplies. Zhu was later executed by Sun Chen.

Sometime between 17 April and 16 May 261, Hu, as Administrator of Xiangyang, reported that the Eastern Wu military officers Deng You (鄧由) and Li Guang (李光) were planning to lead 18 units to defect to Wei, and had already sent their subordinates Zhang Wu (張吳) and Deng Sheng (鄧生) across the border. Upon receiving the news, Sima Zhao and the Wei imperial court ordered Wang Ji, then General Who Attacks the South, to mobilise the military units in all of Jing Province's commanderies, including Xiangyang, in preparation for a large-scale invasion of Eastern Wu with the aid of the defectors. Wang Ji was suspicious of Deng You's and Li Guang's intentions and warned Sima Zhao. As it turned out, Deng and Li were only pretending to defect. (Note: Wang Ji himself died shortly after this incident, in June that year.)

=== Invasion of Shu and Zhong Hui's mutiny ===
During the invasion of Shu, Hu, as Zhong Hui's subordinate, was tasked together with Li Fu (李輔) to lead a detachment through the Luo Valley (駱谷; southwest of present-day Zhouzhi County, Shaanxi).

While Zhong Hui was supervising the assaults on Lecheng (樂城; east of present-day Chenggu County, Shaanxi) and Hancheng (漢城; east of present-day Mian County, Shaanxi), he ordered Hu to lead the vanguard force to attack Yang'an Pass and seize control of the pass's stockpiles of food supplies and equipment.

The Shu general Fu Qian was in charge of guarding Yang'an Pass. His subordinate, Jiang Shu (蔣舒), previously served as an area commander at Wuxing (武興縣; present-day Lueyang County, Shaanxi). However, due to incompetence, he was removed from his appointment and reassigned to Yang'an Pass. As a result, he bore a grudge against the Shu government and secretly desired to defect to Wei.

Jiang Shu first attempted to persuade Fu Qian to lead his troops out of Yang'an Pass to engage the enemy in battle, but Fu Qian refused as he felt that it was too risky. Jiang Shu then lied to Fu Qian that he would go out to fight the enemy while Fu Qian would remain behind to guard the pass. After Fu Qian agreed, Jiang Shu led the troops out of Yang'an Pass to Yinping, where he surrendered to Hu Lie. Seeing that Yang'an Pass's defences had weakened after Jiang Shu's defection, Hu Lie led his troops to attack the pass and succeeded in capturing it along with its resources. Fu Qian fought bravely to resist the enemy but ultimately lost his life. The Wei soldiers were impressed by his heroism.

After the fall of Shu, the Wu emperor Sun Xiu ordered his general Lu Kang to lead 30,000 troops to besiege Yong'an. After a six-month-long siege, more than half of Yong'an's population fell sick from infectious diseases. Just then, Hu Lie led reinforcements from Jing Province to help Luo Xian and lift the siege on Yong'an. The Wu forces retreated upon seeing the arrival of Wei reinforcements.

Zhong Hui, Hu Lie, Shi Zuan (師纂) and others then accused Deng Ai of showing disrespect for the Wei imperial court's authority, and claimed that he was likely to start a rebellion.

Zhong Hui then arrived in Chengdu on 29 February 264. The following day, he summoned all the high-ranking officers and former Shu officers to the old Shu imperial court in the name of holding a memorial service for the recently deceased Empress Dowager Guo. During the service, he showed them an imperial decree and claimed it was issued by the empress dowager before she died. In the decree, Empress Dowager Guo wanted all those who were loyal to Wei to rise up against Sima Zhao and remove him from power. The decree was actually a fake one written by Zhong Hui. Zhong Hui sought the officers' opinions, asked them to sign on a list if they agreed to carry out the empress dowager's dying wish, and then instructed his close aides to take over command of the various military units. He then had all the officers (including Hu Lie) detained in their respective offices with the doors shut, and ordered the gates of the city to be closed and tightly guarded.

Qiu Jian (丘建), an officer serving under Zhong Hui, used to be a subordinate of Hu Lie; Hu Lie had recommended Qiu to Sima Zhao. Zhong Hui favoured and regarded Qiu Jian highly and requested for Qiu to be transferred to his unit. Qiu Jian sympathised with Hu Lie, who was detained alone inside a room, so he approached Zhong Hui and said that each of the detained officers should have a servant to attend to their personal needs. Zhong Hui agreed. Hu Lie lied to his servant and wrote a letter to his sons, in which he claimed he heard from Qiu Jian that Zhong Hui was planning to purge the officers not from his own unit by luring them into a trap and killing them. The rumour spread like wildfire among all the detained officers. When Zhong Hui's men received news about the rumour, they suggested to their superior to execute all the officers holding the rank of Cavalry Commandant of the Standard (牙門騎督) and above. Zhong Hui could not decide on what to do.

Around noon on 3 March 264, Hu Lie's sons and subordinates started beating the drums and their soldiers followed suit. After that, they rushed towards the city gates in a disorderly manner because they had no one to lead them. Around the time, Jiang Wei was collecting his armour and weapons from Zhong Hui when they heard shouting and received news that a fire had broken out. Moments later, it was reported that many soldiers were crowding near the city gates. Zhong Hui was surprised and he asked Jiang Wei, "Those men are causing trouble. What should we do?" Jiang Wei replied, "Kill them." Zhong Hui then ordered his men to kill the officers who were still detained in their offices. Some of the officers used pieces of furniture to block the doors. Zhong Hui's men rammed the doors but could not force them open. A while later, there were reports of people climbing up the city gates on ladders and of people setting fire to buildings. Chaos broke out and arrows were fired in all directions. The detained officers broke out of captivity, regrouped with their men, and attacked Zhong Hui and Jiang Wei. Zhong Hui and Jiang Wei fought the mutinying soldiers and slew about five or six of them, but were eventually overwhelmed and killed by them. Hundreds of lives were lost in the mutiny.

== Service under Western Jin ==
Sima Zhao died in September 265, about a year and a half after Zhong Hui's failed mutiny; his son Sima Yan took his place as regent of Cao Wei. A few months later, in February 266, Sima Yan forced Cao Huan to abdicate and founded the Jin dynasty; Hu Lie continued to serve the Jin court.

In November or December 268, Sun Hao decided to wage war against Jin, so he ordered Wan Yu and Shi Ji to lead the Wu forces in Jing Province to attack the Jin dynasty. Wan Yu led troops to attack Xiangyang Commandery (襄陽郡; present-day Xiangyang, Hubei), but was defeated and driven back by Hu Lie.

In 268, parts of northern China were hit by floods and droughts, and the minister Fu Xuan feared that the tribes in the northwest, particularly the Xianbei, would rebel. The following year, Fu proposed that Hu Lie, by then the Inspector of Qin province, (Note: Per the annals of Emperor Wu in Book of Jin, Qin province was created in March or April 269 (2nd month of the 5th year of the Tai'shi era; the month corresponds to 20 Mar to 18 Apr 269 in the Julian calendar). Thus, Hu was likely the province's first Inspector. The Zizhi Tongjian explicitly indicated that Hu was Qin province's first Inspector.) be tasked in quelling a future revolt due to his reputation in the west. However, Fu was still concerned that even if Hu Lie defeated the rebels, they could easily escape to the commanderies of Anding or Wuwei (武威郡; in present-day Jingyuan County, Gansu), so he also suggested setting up a new commandery around Gaopingchuan (高平川; in present-day Guyuan, Ningxia), where settlers will be recruited and supplemented with corvée exemptions. The commandery, along with Anding and Wuwei, would be transferred to Qin under Hu Lie. Fu Xuan also suggested opening a new northbound passage to encourage migration and gradually strengthen their hold on the border.

One minister, Chen Qian warned against appointing Hu Lie and another general, Qian Hong, as provincial inspectors. He argued that while the two were strong generals, they were both tactless and not suited to maintain order around the borders. However, his advice was ignored.

A rebellion soon broke out in Qin in June or July 270 after Hu Lie lost the support of the tribes. The rebellion's leader was Tufa Shujineng, the chieftain of the Tufa tribe in Hexi. Although Shujineng was a Xianbei, historical records indicate that the rebellion consisted of several different tribal people, with the rebels being collectively referred to as "Qiang" or "Di".

Hu Lie led his troops and camped at Wanhu Mound (萬斛堆; located in Gaolan County, Gansu) to campaign against Shujineng. However, Shujineng and the chieftains, Baihuwen (白虎文) and Yaolanni (藥蘭泥), surrounded Hu Lie's army and killed him. The Prince of Fufeng, Sima Liang, was supposed to send reinforcements to help Hu Lie through his subordinates Liu Qi (劉旂) and Jing Yan (敬琰), but the two refused to move their troops. Emperor Wu wanted to punish Liu Qi, but Sima Liang defended him and lost his post in the process. He was replaced as Inspector of Qin province by Du Yu.
