= Tian Xu =

3rd century Cao Wei military officer

Tian Xu 田續
- Born: Unknown; Jizhou District, Tianjin
- Died: Unknown
- Occupation: Military officer

Tian Xu (fl. 220–264) was a military officer of the state of Cao Wei during the Three Kingdoms period of China.

== Life ==
Tian Xu was from Wuzhong County (無終縣), Youbeiping Commandery (右北平郡), which is in present-day Jizhou District, Tianjin. He was a grand-nephew of Tian Chou, an official who served under the warlord Cao Cao in the late Eastern Han dynasty.

In 220, after Cao Pi (Cao Cao's son and successor) ended the Eastern Han dynasty and established the state of Cao Wei with himself as its first emperor, he wanted to honour Tian Chou for his good moral character. However, as both Tian Chou and his son were already deceased, Cao Pi decided to make Tian Xu the successor to Tian Chou, and he awarded Tian Xu the title of a Secondary Marquis (關內侯).

In 263, Tian Xu participated in the campaign against Wei's rival state, Shu Han, as an officer under the Wei general Deng Ai. When Deng Ai and the Shu general Jiang Wei were locked in a stalemate at Jiange (劍閣), Deng Ai decided to take a shortcut from Yinping (陰平) to Jiangyou (江油) to bypass Jiang Wei's defences. Tian Xu disobeyed Deng Ai's orders when he refused to advance, so Deng Ai wanted to execute him. Later, after Deng Ai defeated the Shu general Zhuge Zhan at Mianzhu (緜竹), Jiang Wei retreated from Jiange to Ba Commandery (巴郡). Another Wei army led by Zhong Hui advanced towards Fu County (涪縣), where Zhong Hui ordered Tian Xu, Hu Lie, Pang Hui and others to lead troops to pursue Jiang Wei's retreating army.

Later that year, after the Shu emperor Liu Shan had surrendered and Shu had been vanquished by Wei, Zhong Hui planned to rebel against the Cao Wei state. He accused Deng Ai of plotting a rebellion and had Deng Ai arrested and sent back to the Wei capital, Luoyang. Zhong Hui staged a revolt in 264 but it was crushed and he lost his life. Deng Ai's subordinates wanted to bring their superior back from Luoyang. Wei Guan, another Wei officer who plotted with Zhong Hui against Deng Ai, feared that Deng Ai would take revenge on him if he returned, so he instigated Tian Xu to kill Deng Ai by reminding him of how Deng Ai wanted to execute him at Yinping in the previous year. Tian Xu led his men to intercept Deng Ai at Sanzao Village (三造亭), Mianzhu, where he killed Deng Ai and his son Deng Zhong (鄧忠).

== See also ==
- Lists of people of the Three Kingdoms
