= Zhuge Xu =

Mid-3rd century Cao Wei general and Western Jin official

- 諸葛緒

Minister of the Guards (衛尉)
- In office ?–?
- Monarch: Emperor Wu of Jin

Minister of Ceremonies (太常)
- In office ?–?
- Monarch: Emperor Wu of Jin

Inspector of Yong Province (雍州刺史)
- In office ? – 265
- Monarch: Cao Huan

Administrator of Taishan (泰山太守)
- In office ?–?
- Monarchs: Cao Mao; Cao Huan

Personal details
- Born: Unknown Yinan County, Shandong
- Died: Unknown
- Relations: Zhuge Wan (granddaughter; daughter of Zhuge Chong); Zhuge Quan (grandson; elder brother of Zhuge Wan); Zhuge Mei (grandson; younger brother of Zhuge Quan (Note: Zhuge Quan's name was recorded differently (but with the same pronunciation) in Yanzhou Ji (兖州记) by Xun Chuo (荀绰).)); Zhuge Nanzi (granddaughter; daughter of Zhuge Chong)
- Children: Zhuge Chong; Zhuge Hong
- Occupation: General, politician

Zhuge Xu (fl.250 – 260s) was a Chinese general and politician of the state of Cao Wei during the Three Kingdoms period of China.

== Life ==
Zhuge Xu was from Yangdu County (陽都縣), Langya Commandery (琅邪郡), which is in present-day Yinan County, Shandong. He was probably a distant relative of other famous Zhuges in the Three Kingdoms period, such as Zhuge Jin, Zhuge Liang and Zhuge Dan, since he shared the same ancestral home as them. He served in the state of Cao Wei in the Three Kingdoms period.

In 255, when the Wei generals Guanqiu Jian and Wen Qin started a rebellion in Shouchun (壽春; present-day Shou County, Anhui), Zhuge Xu was then serving as the Administrator (太守) of Taishan Commandery (泰山郡; around present-day Tai'an, Shandong). Under the command of Deng Ai, he led troops from Taishan Commandery to assist other Wei imperial forces led by the regent Sima Shi to suppress the rebellion.

Zhuge Xu was later promoted to the position of Inspector (刺史) of Yong Province in an unknown year. In 263, he participated in the campaign against one of Wei's rival states, Shu. His mission was to lead 30,000 troops to block the Shu general Jiang Wei at a bridge in Yinping (陰平) and stop him from reinforcing Yang'an Pass (陽安關). When Jiang Wei heard about it, he pretended to launch an attack on Yong Province via Konghan Valley (孔函谷). Zhuge Xu fell for the ruse, thought that Jiang Wei wanted to attack his base, so he ordered his troops to retreat from Yinping by 30 li. Jiang Wei then seized the opportunity to cross the bridge at Yinping. When Zhuge Xu found out and tried to stop Jiang Wei, he was already one day behind time. Later, the Wei general Zhong Hui advanced south from Yang'an Pass and reached Baishui (白水). At the time, another Wei general Deng Ai wanted to link up with Zhuge Xu and attack the enemy position at Jiangyou (江油) together, but Zhuge Xu refused and moved to Baishui to join Zhong Hui instead. At Baishui, Zhong Hui accused Zhuge Xu of cowardice, seized command of his troops and sent him as a prisoner back to Yong Province. (Note: Since Zhong Hui was later killed during his rebellion, and Zhuge Xu went on to serve the Jin dynasty, it was probable that charges against him were never prosecuted.)

Zhuge Xu later served in the Western Jin dynasty, which replaced the Cao Wei state in February 266 after the regent Sima Yan usurped the throne from the last Wei emperor Cao Huan. He served as Minister of Ceremonies (太常) under the Jin government and then Minister of the Guards (衛尉) under Empress Dowager Wang Yuanji.

== Children and descendants ==
Zhuge Xu had at least two sons: Zhuge Chong (諸葛冲), courtesy name Zhangmao (长茂) or Maozhang (茂长), and Zhuge Hong (諸葛厷).

Zhuge Chong's daughter Zhuge Wan was selected to enter Sima Yan's harem in the spring of 273. Zhuge Wan's brother Zhuge Mei later married a younger sister of Zhou Mu (周穆); their common brother-in-law was Sima Xia (司馬遐), son of Emperor Wu and Lady Chen and father of Sima Tan. In February or March 307, Zhuge Mei and Zhou Mu (Note: Zhou Mu's mother was a paternal aunt of Sima Yue.) both advised Sima Yue, regent of Emperor Huai of Jin, to install Sima Tan to the throne, but Yue, angered by their suggestion, had them executed.

Zhuge Chong had another daughter, Zhuge Nanzi (诸葛男姊), who married Shi Xian, (Note: Shi's name was written as "尠" in his epitaph, and as "鲜" in Book of Jin.) the second son of Shi Jian (石鉴). (Note: While Shi Jian and Zhuge Chong were not identified by their names in Shi Xian's epitaph, they can be identified by the recorded titles and positions.)

Zhuge Wan's elder brother Zhuge Quan was killed on 5 May 311, together with Wang Yan and many other Jin officials and princes, by Shi Le, in the aftermath of Sima Yue's death in April that year.

== See also ==
- Lists of people of the Three Kingdoms

== Sources ==
- Chen, Shou (3rd century). Records of the Three Kingdoms (Sanguozhi).
- Fang, Xuanling (ed.) (648). Book of Jin (Jin Shu).
- Pei, Songzhi (5th century). Annotated Records of the Three Kingdoms (Sanguozhi zhu).
- Sima, Guang (1084). Zizhi Tongjian.
