= 雍州 =

雍州 may refer to:

- Yamashiro Province, abbreviated name was following Yōshū (雍州), province of Japan located in what is today Kyoto Prefecture
- Yong Prefecture, a prefecture between the 2nd and 7th centuries in modern several places of China
