= Conquest of Shu by Wei =

Military campaign by Cao Wei against Shu Han (263)

- Part of the wars of the Three Kingdoms period
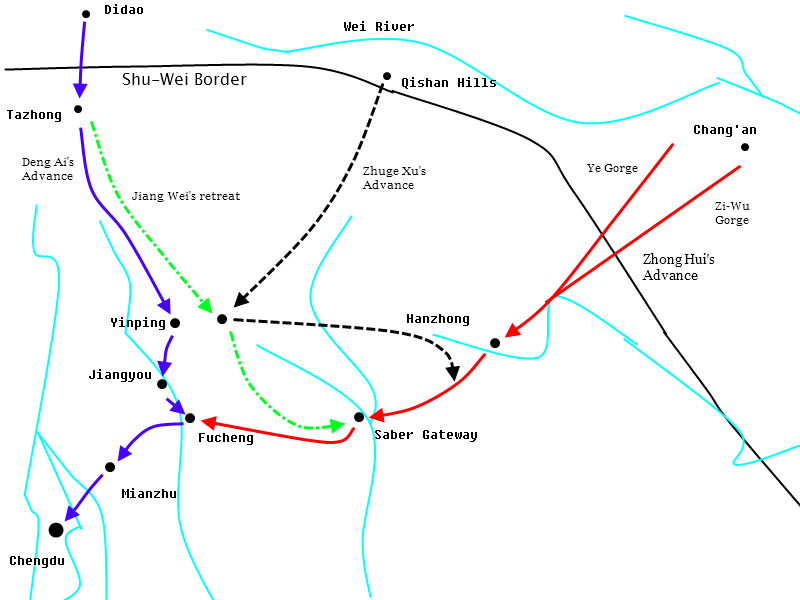
- Conquest of Shu by Wei
Date	c. September or October (Note: The Zizhi Tongjian recorded that the Wei imperial court issued an edict ordering Deng Ai, Zhuge Xu and Zhong Hui to lead Wei forces to attack Shu from three directions. This took place sometime between the 5th and 7th months of the 4th year of the Jingyuan era of Cao Huan's reign. The Wei armies departed the capital Luoyang in the 8th month. The 8th month of the 4th year of Jingyuan corresponds to 20 September to 19 October 263 in the Gregorian calendar.) – November or December 263 (Note: Sima Zhao's biography in the Jin Shu recorded that the Wei generals' reports of victory reached Luoyang in the 10th month of the 4th year of the Jingyuan era of Cao Huan's reign. This month corresponds to 18 November to 17 December 263 in the Gregorian calendar.)
Location	Parts of Sichuan, Gansu and Shaanxi, China
Result	Cao Wei victory; Fall of Shu Han

Belligerents
Cao Wei	Shu Han

Commanders and leaders
Sima Zhao; Zhong Hui; Deng Ai; Zhuge Xu	Liu Shan (surrendered); Jiang Wei (surrendered); Liao Hua (surrendered); Zhuge Zhan †

Strength
160,000–180,000 (Note: Zhong Hui's biography in the Sanguozhi recorded that Deng Ai and Zhuge Xu each led 30,000 troops and Zhong Hui led more than 100,000 troops during the campaign. Sima Zhao's biography in the Jin Shu recorded that Wei mobilised a total of 180,000 troops for the campaign.)	90,000–102,000 (Note: Sima Zhao estimated that Shu had a total of 90,000 troops (50,000 at the frontline and 40,000 guarding Chengdu and the inner territories) before the campaign. However, the Shu Ji recorded that Shu had 102,000 troops when Liu Shan surrendered to Deng Ai.)

Conquest of Shu by Wei
- Traditional Chinese: 魏滅蜀之戰 魏滅漢之戰
- Simplified Chinese: 魏灭蜀之战 魏灭汉之战
Transcriptions
Standard Mandarin
- Hanyu Pinyin: Wèi Miè Shǔ Zhī Zhàn; Wèi Miè Hàn Zhī Zhàn

The Conquest of Shu by Wei was a military campaign launched by the dynastic state of Cao Wei against its rival Shu Han in late 263 during the Three Kingdoms period of China. The campaign culminated in the fall of Shu Han and the tripartite equilibrium maintained in China for 43 years since the end of the Eastern Han dynasty in 220. The conquest laid the foundation for an eventual reunified China under the Western Jin dynasty in 280, 17 years after the fall of Shu.

== Background ==
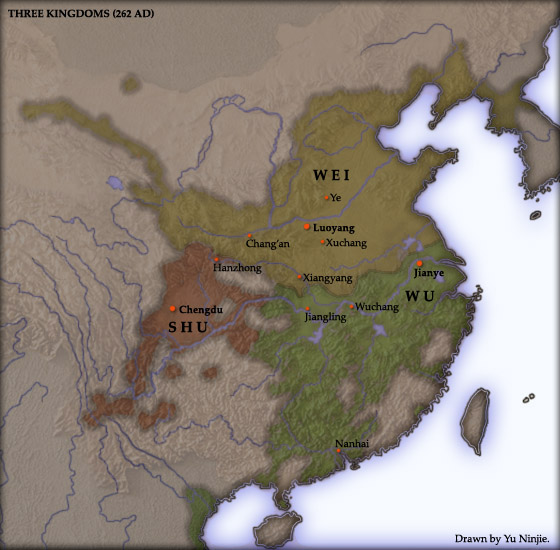
The Three Kingdoms in 262, on the eve of the conquest of Shu by Wei.

Following the end of the Eastern Han dynasty in 220, three contending states emerged in China and fought for control over the territories of the former Han Empire. Among the three, Wei was the most powerful one in terms of military prowess, economic resources, manpower and geographical size. The other two, Shu and Wu, re-established their alliance against Wei in 223.

Between 228 and 234, the Shu regent Zhuge Liang, who advocated an aggressive foreign policy towards Wei, launched a series of five military campaigns (known as the "Northern Expeditions") to attack Wei territories in Yong and Liang provinces (covering parts of present-day Gansu and Shaanxi). The ultimate goal of the campaigns was to clear the path for Shu forces to capture the Wei capital, Luoyang, and restore the Han dynasty. All the campaigns turned out unsuccessful. After Zhuge Liang died in 234, his successors Jiang Wan and Fei Yi adopted a more defensive stance against Wei and focused on policies promoting internal development and stability in Shu. However, between 240 and 262, the Shu general Jiang Wei followed up on Zhuge Liang's legacy by launching another 11 military campaigns against Wei. However, each campaign was ultimately aborted due to inadequate food supplies, heavy losses on the battlefield, or other reasons. The campaigns not only severely depleted Shu's already limited resources and took a heavy toll on Shu's population, but also resulted in much public resentment against Jiang Wei.

In the meantime, the Wei general Sima Yi came to power after staging a successful coup d'état in 249. After his death in 251, his eldest son Sima Shi succeeded him as regent and consolidated power and control over the Wei government. In 254, Sima Shi deposed the Wei emperor Cao Fang, who tried to seize back power from him, and installed Cao Mao on the throne. Following Sima Shi's death in 255, his younger brother Sima Zhao became the new regent and continued to monopolise power in Wei. In 260, Cao Mao attempted to launch a coup d'état to overthrow Sima Zhao but failed and lost his life. Cao Huan, who succeeded Cao Mao as the Wei emperor, remained a puppet ruler under Sima Zhao's influence and control.

== Wei strategic planning ==
Timeline of the Conquest of Shu by Wei
Approximate date range	Location	Event(s)
Winter 262	Luoyang, Henan	Sima Zhao announces his plan for the conquest of Shu to the Wei imperial court. He puts Zhong Hui in charge of military affairs in the Guanzhong region. Wei mobilises about 180,000 troops from its various provinces in preparation for the invasion of Shu.
Early 263	Zhugqu County, Gansu	Jiang Wei sends a warning to Chengdu that Wei appears to be preparing for an invasion of Shu. Huang Hao advises Liu Shan to ignore the warning.
Autumn 263	Luoyang, Henan	The Wei imperial court issues an edict outlining a three-pronged invasion of Shu: Zhong Hui, Deng Ai and Zhuge Xu would each lead an army to attack Shu from the eastern, western and central flanks respectively.
20 September – 19 October 263	Luoyang, Henan	The Wei armies set out from Luoyang.
20 September – 19 October 263	Shaanxi	Zhong Hui executes Xu Yi for failing his mission to oversee the construction of a road leading into Shu.
20 September – 19 October 263	Chenggu County and Mian County, Shaanxi	Zhong Hui orders Li Fu and Xun Kai to attack Lecheng and Hancheng counties respectively. Wang Han and Jiang Bin manage to hold their positions at Lecheng and Hancheng respectively.
20 September – 19 October 263	Ningqiang County, Shaanxi	Zhong Hui sends Hu Lie to attack Yang'an Pass. Jiang Shu surrenders to Hu Lie and assists him in conquering Yang'an Pass. Fu Qian is killed in action while defending the pass.
20 October – 17 November 263	Tianshui, Longxi County and Yuzhong County, Gansu, and Ankang, Shaanxi	Wei Commandery administrators Wang Qi, Qian Hong, Yang Xin and Liu Qin lead troops from their respective commanderies to join the invasion of Shu.
20 October – 17 November 263	Longnan and Wen County, Gansu	Liu Shan sends Liao Hua, and Zhang Yi and Dong Jue, to lead reinforcements to Tazhong and Yang'an Pass respectively. The Shu reinforcements stop at Yinping when they learn that Zhuge Xu's army is attacking Jianwei.
20 October – 17 November 263	Zhugqu County, Gansu	Deng Ai defeats Jiang Wei at Tazhong.
20 October – 17 November 263	Intersection of the Bailong and Jialing rivers	Jiang Wei attempts to retreat to Baishui but Yang Xin intercepts him at Qiangchuankou and defeats him.
20 October – 17 November 263	Wen County, Gansu	Jiang Wei heads north to Konghan Valley to bypass Zhuge Xu, who is blocking Wujie Bridge near Yinping. When Zhuge Xu lifts the blockade, Jiang Wei quickly turns back, crosses the bridge and moves on to Jiange. Zhuge Xu arrives too late to stop Jiang Wei.
20 October – 17 November 263	Jiange County, Sichuan	Jiang Wei, Liao Hua, Zhang Yi and Dong Jue retreat to Jiange. Zhong Hui attacks Jiange several times but fails to breach the Shu defences.
20 October – 17 November 263	Wen County, Gansu and Jiange County, Sichuan	Deng Ai comes up with the idea of taking a shortcut from Yinping to Mianzhu to bypass Jiange's defences and go straight for Chengdu. He asks Zhuge Xu to join him but the latter refuses. Zhong Hui frames Zhuge Xu for cowardice and seizes command of his army.
18 November – 17 December 263	Wen County, Gansu	Deng Ai leads an elite strike force through a shortcut bypassing Jiange and leading from Yinping to Chengdu.
18 November – 17 December 263	Jiangyou, Sichuan	Ma Miao, the Shu administrator of Jiangyou, surrenders to Deng Ai.
18 November – 17 December 263	Mianzhu, Sichuan	Deng Ai defeats Zhuge Zhan at Mianzhu. Zhuge Zhan, Zhuge Shang, Huang Chong, Li Qiu and Zhang Zun are killed in battle.
18 November – 17 December 263	Mianyang, Sichuan	Jiang Wei abandons Jiange and heads towards Ba Commandery. Zhong Hui moves to Fu County and orders Hu Lie, Tian Xu and Pang Hui to pursue Jiang Wei.
18 November – 17 December 263	Chengdu and Guanghan, Sichuan	Liu Shan sends Zhang Shao, Qiao Zhou and Deng Liang to bring his surrender document and imperial seal to Deng Ai at Luo County. He also instructs Zhang Jun and Jiang Xian to relay his orders for the rest of Shu to surrender to Wei. He sends Li Hu to order Jiang Wei to surrender to Zhong Hui at Fu County.
18 November – 17 December 263	Chengdu, Sichuan	Deng Ai and his forces occupy Chengdu.
18 November – 17 December 263	Mianyang, Sichuan	Jiang Wei surrenders to Zhong Hui at Fu County.

=== Wei decision to attack Shu ===
In 262, (Note: The Zizhi Tongjian recorded that Sima Zhao made this announcement in the 3rd year of the Jingyuan era of Cao Huan's reign. This year corresponds to c.262 in the Julian calendar. However, Sima Zhao's biography in the Jin Shu recorded that he made this announcement in the summer of the 4th year of the Jingyuan era, which corresponds to the summer of 263. This article follows the dates in the Zizhi Tongjian. The Chinese year 263 has 13 months, and corresponds to 27 Jan 263 to 14 Feb 264 in the Julian calendar.) Sima Zhao noted that Shu was growing weak and lacking in resources after constantly waging war against Wei, so he wanted to launch a large-scale invasion of Shu to eliminate the threat of Shu. Among those he consulted, only Zhong Hui agreed that Wei was capable of conquering Shu. Zhong Hui then assisted Sima Zhao in formulating a strategy for the conquest of Shu.

Sima Zhao made an announcement to the Wei imperial court as follows:

"Since the Shouchun rebellions, we have not launched a military expedition for six years; we have trained our soldiers and repaired their armor, such that we may eliminate the two barbaric states. If we plan to conquer Wu, I estimate that the process of constructing ships and opening up waterways will take up more than 1,000 units of ten-thousand-manpower. In other words, we will need 100,000 labourers to work over a period of more than 100 days. Besides, the southern lands are humid, and our troops will surely fall victim to plague and disease. Therefore, I think we should conquer Shu first. Three years after that, we can make use of Shu's geographical advantage by sending our navy downstream along the river to attack Wu, while concurrently sending our army to invade Wu by land. It would be as easy as Jin conquering Yu and Guo, and Qin eliminating Han and Wei. According to our calculations, Shu has a 90,000-strong army, of which more than 40,000 troops guard Chengdu and the interior commanderies. This means they have fewer than 50,000 troops elsewhere. Presently, we can distract Jiang Wei at Tazhong and make him unable to deal with the situation to his east. We can then send our army through the Luo Valley where they are least defended, to seize control of Hanzhong. If the Shu forces remain in their forts and passes, they will be isolated from each other. We can send the bulk of our forces to conquer their cities and smaller detachments to seize their towns and villages. By then, they will have neither sufficient time nor manpower to guard Jiange and Yang'an Pass. At that point, with Liu Shan's ineptness as a ruler, with Shu's border defenses shattered, and with its people quivering with fear, the fall of Shu is inevitable."

The Wei general Deng Ai, who had been leading Wei forces to resist multiple Shu incursions along the Wei–Shu border since 255, (Note: See Deng Ai#Battles against Shu.) voiced strong objections to the campaign against Shu. Sima Zhao worried that Deng Ai would embolden others to oppose the campaign as well, so he commissioned his registrar Shi Zuan (師纂) as a major under Deng Ai and ordered him to "persuade" Deng Ai. Deng Ai then changed his mind and supported the campaign.

=== Wei's three-pronged invasion of Shu ===
In the winter of 262, Sima Zhao appointed Zhong Hui as General Who Guards the West (鎮西將軍) and granted him imperial authority to oversee military affairs in the Guanzhong region. The Wei government also mobilised about 180,000 troops from the various provinces throughout Wei in preparation for the invasion of Shu. At the same time, the Wei government also put Tang Zi in charge of overseeing the construction of warships in preparation for a future invasion of Wei's other rival state, Wu.

In the autumn of 263, the Wei imperial court issued an edict outlining a three-pronged invasion of Shu:

- Deng Ai would lead 30,000 troops through Gansong (甘松; southeast of present-day Têwo County, Gansu) to attack Jiang Wei's position at Tazhong (沓中; northwest of present-day Zhugqu County, Gansu);
- Zhuge Xu would lead 30,000 troops to Wujie Bridge (武街橋; northwest of present-day Wen County, Gansu) to block Jiang Wei's retreat route;
- Zhong Hui would lead more than 100,000 troops to attack Shu via the Xie Valley (斜谷; southwest of present-day Mei County, Shaanxi);
  - Zhong Hui's subordinates, Li Fu (李輔) and Hu Lie, would lead a detachment through the Luo Valley (駱谷; southwest of present-day Zhouzhi County, Shaanxi).
  - The Wei imperial court authorised Wei Guan to supervise Zhong Hui and Deng Ai's military operations. Wei Guan also held the appointment of an acting military judge under Zhong Hui, and had command of 1,000 troops.

== Shu strategic planning ==
=== Changes in the Shu defences at Hanzhong ===
Previously, when the Shu general Wei Yan first took charge of guarding Hanzhong Commandery in 219, he borrowed the concept of "double gates" from the Yijing and deployed heavily armed troops at interlocking camps on the outskirts and exits of trails leading into Hanzhong. These camps were meant to obstruct and hold off any invading forces. During the Battle of Xingshi in 244, the Shu general Wang Ping used the same strategy to defend Hanzhong from a Wei invasion led by Cao Shuang.

Jiang Wei pointed out that Wei Yan's idea of the interlocking camps was useful for only defence and would not provide additional advantages. He proposed vacating the camps and moving all their troops and resources to the two fortresses of Hancheng (漢城; east of present-day Mian County, Shaanxi) and Lecheng (樂城; east of present-day Chenggu County, Shaanxi), which provided access the Hanzhong Plain. The idea was to lure the invaders to attack the fortresses, overstretch their supply lines, and wear them down through guerrilla-style attacks. Once the invaders decided to retreat, the defenders would seize the opportunity to launch an all-out counterattack and defeat them.

In 258, Jiang Wei ordered Hu Ji, Jiang Bin and Wang Han (王含), who oversaw Hanzhong's defences, to dismantle the interlocking camps and move their troops and resources to Hanshou (漢壽; northeast of present-day Jiange County, Sichuan), Hancheng and Lecheng respectively. He also ordered the defence infrastructure to be strengthened at a number of locations around Hanzhong: Xi'an (西安), Jianwei (建威), Wuwei (武衛), Shimen (石門), Wucheng (武城), Jianchang (建昌) and Linyuan (臨遠).

=== Jiang Wei's early warning ===
In early 263, Jiang Wei wrote a memorial to the Shu emperor Liu Shan as follows:

"I heard that Zhong Hui has been mobilising troops in Guanzhong and appears to be preparing to launch an invasion. As a precautionary measure, I think we should send Zhang Yi and Liao Hua to lead our forces to guard Yang'an Pass and the bridge at Yinping."

One of Liu Shan's trusted eunuchs, Huang Hao, who believed in sorcery, believed a fortune-tellers' prediction that Wei would not invade Shu, so he advised the emperor to ignore Jiang Wei's memorial and not put it up for discussion in the imperial court.

== Prelude ==
Between 20 September and 19 October 263, the Wei troops mobilised for the campaign had gathered in the Wei capital Luoyang and were ready to depart. Before they left, the Wei government gave out promotions and rewards, and staged a drill to boost their morale. During this time, when a Wei officer Deng Dun (鄧敦) said that Shu could not be conquered, Sima Zhao executed him as a warning to others to not speak ill of the campaign.

Zhong Hui had ordered Xu Yi, a son of the veteran Wei general Xu Chu, to oversee the construction of a road leading into Shu. However, when the road turned out to be poorly built, Zhong Hui disregarded Xu Yi's background and executed him for failing his mission. The Wei army was shocked at Zhong Hui's audacity.

=== Wei reinforcements ===
Between 20 October and 17 November 263, (Note: Sima Zhao's biography in the Jin Shu recorded that this took place in the 9th month of the 4th year of the Jingyuan era of Cao Huan's reign. This month corresponds to 20 October to 17 November 263 in the Gregorian calendar.) Sima Zhao ordered three commandery administrators to lead their garrison forces to join the campaign: Wang Qi (grandfather of Wang Mi) to lead troops from Tianshui Commandery to attack Jiang Wei's camp; Qian Hong to lead troops from Longxi Commandery and launch a frontal assault on Jiang Wei's position; and Yang Xin (楊欣) to lead troops from Jincheng Commandery (金城郡; around present-day Yuzhong County, Gansu) to attack Gansong.

Liu Qin (劉欽) also led troops from Weixing Commandery (魏興郡; around present-day Ankang, Shaanxi) to attack Hanzhong Commandery via the Ziwu Valley (子午谷; east of present-day Yang County, Shaanxi).

=== Shu response to the Wei invasion ===
Upon receiving news of the Wei invasion, the Shu government ordered Liao Hua to lead reinforcements to support Jiang Wei at Tazhong. At the same time, they also sent Zhang Yi, Dong Jue and others to lead troops to Yang'an Pass (陽安關; a.k.a. Yangping Pass 陽平關; in present-day Ningqiang County, Shaanxi) and assist the Shu forces defending the external perimeter.

When the Shu reinforcements reached Yinping (陰平; present-day Wen County, Gansu), they heard that the Wei army led by Zhuge Xu was attacking Jianwei (建威; northeast of present-day Wudu District, Longnan, Gansu), so they stopped in their tracks at Yinping.

== Eastern flank ==
Map of present-day Sichuan showing key locations on the eastern flank: Hancheng, Lecheng and Yang'an Pass.

=== Lecheng and Hancheng ===
Around September or October 263, after his army passed through the Xie and Luo valleys as planned, Zhong Hui ordered his subordinates Li Fu and Xun Kai (荀愷) to each lead a detachment of 10,000 troops to attack Lecheng and Hancheng respectively. At the time, Lecheng and Hancheng were respectively guarded by the Shu officers Wang Han (王含) and Jiang Bin, who each commanded 5,000 troops.

During this time, Zhong Hui wrote to Jiang Bin to ask him for the location of the tomb of his father Jiang Wan. Jiang Bin politely obliged and told Zhong Hui that his father's tomb was in Fu County (涪縣; present-day Mianyang, Sichuan). Zhong Hui sent his men to pay respects on his behalf at Zhuge Liang's tomb at Mount Dingjun, and later visited Jiang Wan's tomb when he reached Fu County.

Wang Han and Jiang Bin managed to hold their positions at Lecheng and Hancheng respectively. After failing to capture either of the two fortresses, Zhong Hui led his army to bypass the two fortresses and move on towards Yang'an Pass. While Wang Han's eventual fate is unknown, it is recorded that after the fall of Shu, Jiang Bin surrendered to Zhong Hui at Fu County and befriended him.

=== Yang'an Pass ===
While Zhong Hui was supervising the assaults on Lecheng and Hancheng, he ordered Hu Lie to lead the vanguard force to attack Yang'an Pass and seize control of the pass's stockpiles of food supplies and equipment.

The Shu general Fu Qian was in charge of guarding Yang'an Pass. His subordinate, Jiang Shu (蔣舒), previously served as an area commander at Wuxing (武興縣; present-day Lueyang County, Shaanxi). However, due to incompetence, he was removed from his appointment and reassigned to Yang'an Pass. As a result, he bore a grudge against the Shu government and secretly desired to defect to Wei.

Jiang Shu first attempted to persuade Fu Qian to lead his troops out of Yang'an Pass to engage the enemy in battle, but Fu Qian refused as he felt that it was too risky. Jiang Shu then lied to Fu Qian that he would go out to fight the enemy while Fu Qian would remain behind to guard the pass. After Fu Qian agreed, Jiang Shu led the troops out of Yang'an Pass to Yinping, where he surrendered to Hu Lie. Seeing that Yang'an Pass's defences had weakened after Jiang Shu's defection, Hu Lie led his troops to attack the pass and succeeded in capturing it along with its resources. Fu Qian fought bravely to resist the enemy but ultimately lost his life. The Wei soldiers were impressed by his heroism.

== Western flank ==
Map of present-day Sichuan showing key locations on the western flank: Tazhong, Yinping, Fu County and Jiange.

=== From Tazhong to Yinping ===
Around mid-November 263, after one month of battle at Tazhong, Deng Ai defeated Jiang Wei in battle and forced him to retreat towards Yinping. After Jiang Wei received news that Zhong Hui's army had taken Yang'an Pass and occupied Hanzhong, he attempted to retreat to Baishui (白水; in present-day Qingchuan County, Sichuan) but Yang Xin caught up with him and defeated him at Qiangchuankou (彊川口; the intersection of the Bailong and Jialing rivers) near Yinping.

Upon learning that Zhuge Xu had blocked his retreat route at the Wujie Bridge near Yinping, Jiang Wei led his remaining troops through Konghan Valley (孔函谷; south of present-day Xigu District, Lanzhou, Gansu) to the northern road in an attempt to bypass Zhuge Xu's position. When Zhuge Xu heard about it, he retreated back by 30 li. By then, Jiang Wei and his troops had travelled about 30 li on the northern road when they heard that Zhuge Xu had lifted the blockade at the bridge. Jiang Wei ordered his troops to turn back and quickly cross the bridge. Zhuge Xu tried to turn back to block Jiang Wei again but arrived at the bridge one day too late. After crossing the bridge, Jiang Wei moved to the fortified mountain pass Jiange (in present-day Jiange County, Sichuan) and garrisoned there.

=== Shu defence of Jiange ===
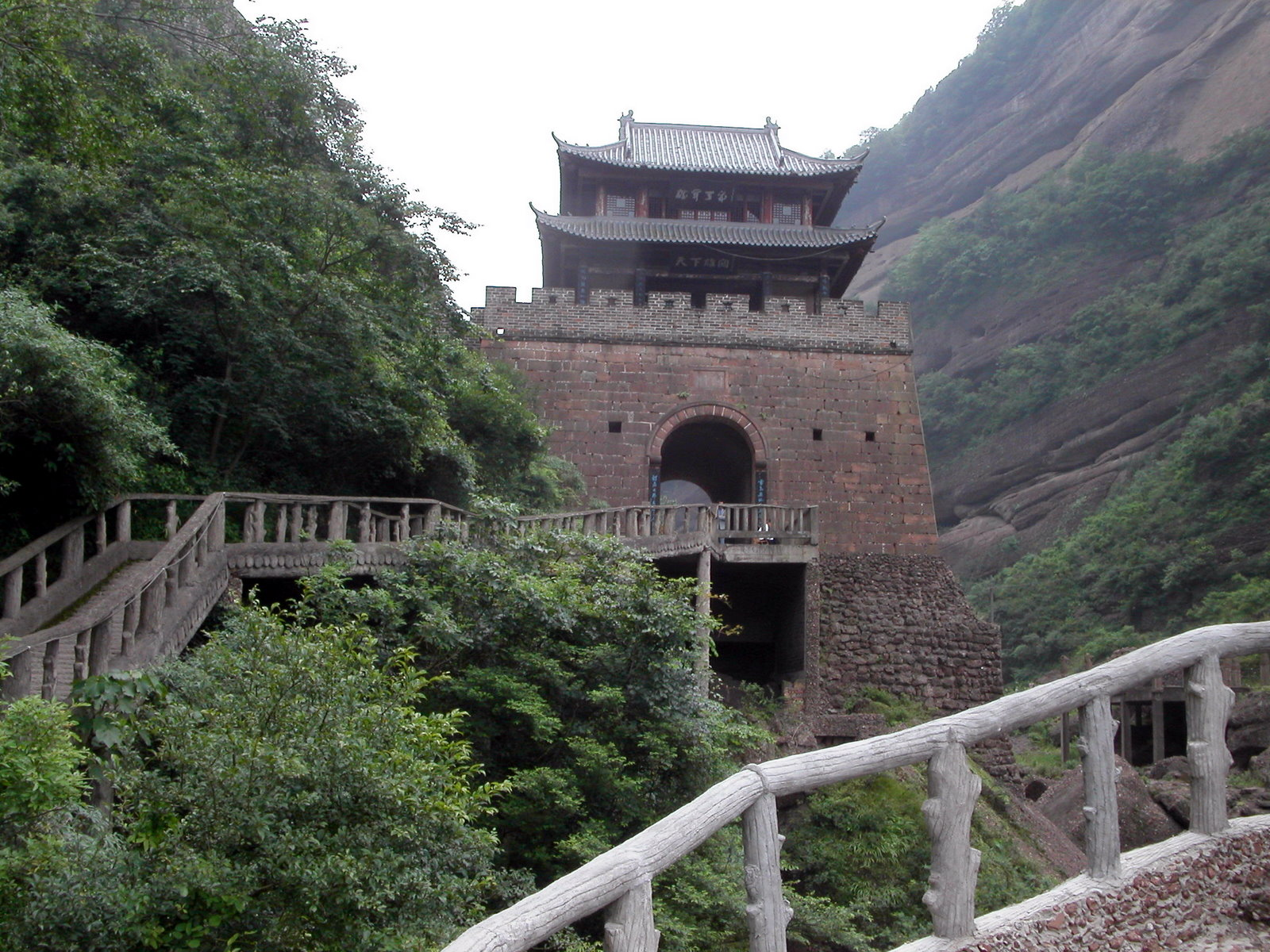
A reconstruction of Jiange (Jianmen Pass) in present-day Jiange County, Sichuan

By the time the Shu reinforcements led by Zhang Yi and Dong Jue reached Hanshou County, Jiang Wei and Liao Hua had decided to abandon their position at Yinping and rendezvous with Zhang Yi and Dong Jue at Jiange.

During this time, Zhong Hui launched several assaults on Jiange but failed to breach the mountain pass's defences. He then wrote a letter to Jiang Wei to persuade him to surrender:

"Sir, you are skilled in both civil and military affairs. You are exceptionally brilliant in strategy and your achievements are well-known throughout the Bashu region and the rest of the Empire. People from near and afar admire you. Every time I reflect on history, I hope that we can serve the same dynasty. Our relationship is like the friendship between Jizha and Zichan."

Jiang Wei did not reply to Zhong Hui's letter, and ordered his troops to strengthen their defences at Jiange. Zhong Hui also wrote a long address to the Shu forces to urge them to surrender:

"In the past, when the Han dynasty declined, the Empire became fragmented and the people suffered extreme hardships. Emperor Wu used his divinely-bestowed military genius to bring order to chaos, save the people from their suffering, and restore peace and stability to the Empire. Emperor Wen followed the will of Heaven and the people, and took the throne. Emperor Ming expanded on their legacy and made glorious achievements during his reign. Outside our borders, there are many people living under different regimes and having different cultures from us, and they have yet to experience the grace and benevolence of our Empire. The three Previous Emperors thought it was a great pity. The current Emperor has a magnanimous heart and the will to expand his predecessors' legacy. His subjects serve with the utmost loyalty, do their best to serve the dynasty, maintain order and stability in government, and bring peace and prosperity to the people. That is why our Empire is so well-ruled. When we show benevolence towards ethnic minorities, they willingly submit to our rule. Are the people of Shu any different from other peoples? It is a shame that the people of Shu are bound to a lifetime of endless servitude. Our army has received a mission to act in accordance with Heaven's will and punish those who oppose the dynasty. The General Who Attacks the West, Inspector of Yong Province, and General Who Guards the West are leading five armies on this mission. The armies of ancient times went to war in the name of righteousness and benevolence. A ruler's army should seek to win the people's hearts instead of simply fighting. Yu Shun ruled with benevolence to win over the Miao; when King Wu of Zhou overthrew the Shang dynasty, he opened up the vaults and distributed the riches to the people, and honoured the virtuous officials who previously served under Shang. At the present, the General Who Guards the West goes to war not for the purposes of gaining greater glory for himself and the dynasty; what he truly desires is to save the people from suffering. He shall explain the perilous situation you are currently in, and he hopes that you will heed his honest advice. The Former Lord of Yi Province had grand ambitions when he built an army from scratch. When he suffered defeats in Ji and Xu provinces and got threatened by Yuan Shao and Lü Bu, our Emperor Wu came to his aid and developed a bond with him. However, he betrayed Emperor Wu later and they no longer shared similar beliefs. While Zhuge Kongming governed Shu well and secured its borders, Jiang Boyue kept waging war, harassing our borders and causing harm to the Qiang and Di peoples. At the time, as we were busy with other affairs, we had no time to deal with his intrusions. Now that our borders are peaceful and our Empire is stable, we decide to amass our forces and wait for an opportunity to launch an all-out retaliatory strike. Shu draws its military strength from only one province and its defences are scattered around; it stands no chance against our imperial army. The Shu forces has already suffered disastrous defeats at Duan Valley and Houhe; it cannot hope to resist the might of our army. In recent years, Shu has never been quite peaceful as it has constantly been in a state of war and its people are already exhausted. How can it hope to resist an army united in spirit and purpose? You have witnessed it. In the past, Shu's chancellor Chen Zhuang was captured by the Qin army, while Gongsun Shu was killed by Wu Han. As you can see, no power can occupy and rule any of the Nine Provinces for long. You would have probably heard that intelligent people can foresee danger and wise people can avoid disaster. That was how Weizi left the Shang dynasty and became a guest of the Zhou dynasty; that was how Chen Ping left Xiang Yu to serve the Han dynasty and made great achievements later. Your desire to seek a moment's peace is akin to consuming a slow-acting poison. Can you not think of doing something better than limiting yourself to serving Shu? Our Empire is willing to spare our enemies and our leaders are willing to show benevolence. Those who surrender to us early receive generous treatment; those who surrender to us late will not be spared. When the Wu general Sun Yi surrendered to us, he received promotions and rewards. Wen Qin and Tang Zi betrayed us and joined the enemy. In the end, when Tang Zi was captured and Wen Qin's two sons surrendered to us, we still treated them well by awarding them titles and appointing them as generals. Tang Zi even had the opportunity to participate in high-level state affairs. The Emperor also highly favoured Sun Yi. Shu has so many virtuous talents, so all the more we would welcome them with open arms. If you can carefully assess the situation and decide to follow in the footsteps of Weizi and Chen Ping, we are willing to treat you and your descendants generously. Imagine how nice this would be: Everyone in the Empire lives in peace and harmony; farmers work in the fields; markets bustle with activity; there is no danger; there is only prosperity for everyone. If you persist in seeking a moment's peace and refuse to mend your ways, it will be too late for regrets by the time our army destroys Shu. Please carefully consider your choices and make the best decision for yourself. You should also inform the others and let everyone know our intentions."

When his army's food supplies ran low, Zhong Hui considered giving up on taking Jiange and retreating.

=== Zhong Hui seizing command of Zhuge Xu's army ===
When Deng Ai asked Zhuge Xu to join him in taking a detour to bypass Jiange, the latter refused because he was not authorised to. Zhuge Xu then led his army to Baishui to rendezvous with Zhong Hui and join him in attacking Jiang Wei at Jiange. Zhong Hui wanted to seize control of Zhuge Xu's army so he secretly reported to the Wei imperial court that Zhuge Xu showed cowardice during battle. As a result, Zhuge Xu was relieved of his command and sent back to the Wei capital Luoyang in a prison cart.

== Deng Ai's detour ==
Map of present-day Sichuan showing key locations on Deng Ai's detour to Chengdu: Yinping, Mianzhu and Chengdu.

When he was at Yinping, Deng Ai came up with the idea of taking a shortcut through Deyang Village that would lead them to an area about 100 li west of Jiange and about 300 li from the Shu capital Chengdu. His idea was to lure Jiang Wei to send reinforcements from Jiange to Fu County and weaken Jiange's defences; if Jiang Wei did not send reinforcements, Fu County would be isolated and easily conquered.

Zhong Hui approved Deng Ai's idea and even ordered his subordinate Tian Zhang (田章) to join Deng Ai on the expedition. Some time between 18 November and 17 December 263, (Note: Deng Ai's biography in the Sanguozhi recorded that he took the shortcut in the 10th month of the 4th year of the Jingyuan era of Cao Huan's reign. This month corresponds to 18 November to 17 December 263 in the Gregorian calendar.) Deng Ai led a strike force from Yinping through the shortcut, bypassing the west of Jiange and heading straight towards Jiangyou. The shortcut covered a distance of more than 700 li and cut across mountainous terrain. Deng Ai and his men had to construct several bridges along the way. The mountains were high and the valleys were deep, which made the journey extremely dangerous. After some time, they were completely cut off from their supply train. Deng Ai wrapped himself in a large piece of felt and rolled down the mountain. His men climbed trees and scaled cliffs in single file. Along the way, they encountered three groups of Shu ambushers, defeated them and destroyed their camps. Deng Ai let Tian Zhang lead the vanguard and clear the path. Deng Ai and his vanguard showed up at Jiangyou. Ma Miao (馬邈), the Shu-appointed administrator of Jiangyou, gave up resistance and surrendered to Deng Ai.

== Battle of Mianzhu ==
Following their capture of Jiangyou, Deng Ai and his men pushed on further to Fu County, where they encountered resistance from Shu forces led by Zhuge Zhan. Zhuge Zhan's subordinate, Huang Chong, urged his superior to swiftly take control of the mountainous terrain around Fu County and use that geographical advantage to stop the Wei forces from entering the flat lands. When Zhuge Zhan hesitated, Huang Chong broke down in tears as he repeatedly urged the former to do so.

Zhuge Zhan then ordered his vanguard force to attack Deng Ai at Fu County but they lost the battle. Zhuge Zhan and his remaining troops then retreated to Mianzhu, where he soon received a letter from Deng Ai asking him to surrender. A furious Zhuge Zhan executed the messenger who delivered the letter, and ordered his troops to assemble in formation outside Mianzhu and prepare to engage the enemy in battle.

Deng Ai ordered his son Deng Zhong (鄧忠) and subordinate Shi Zuan (師纂) to each lead a detachment of troops to flank Zhuge Zhan from the right and left respectively. After failing to break the Shu formation, they returned to Deng Ai and told him: "The enemy cannot be defeated." Deng Ai sternly replied: "This battle will determine whether we live or die. What do you mean when you say the enemy cannot be defeated?" When he threatened to execute them for cowardice, they quickly turned back and led their troops to attack again. On their second attempt, they succeeded in breaking the Shu formation and then proceeded to occupy Mianzhu. Zhuge Zhan, along with his son Zhuge Shang and subordinates Huang Chong, Li Qiu and Zhang Zun, were all killed in action at Mianzhu.

== Fall of Shu ==
When Jiang Wei learnt of the fall of Mianzhu, he led his forces east towards Ba Commandery (巴郡; present-day Chongqing). Zhong Hui led his army to Fu County (涪县, present-day Mianyang, Sichuan) and ordered Hu Lie, Tian Xu, Pang Hui and others to lead troops to pursue Jiang Wei.

=== Liu Shan's surrender ===
In the meantime, after capturing Mianzhu, Deng Ai and his men pressed on further to Luo County (雒縣; north of present-day Guanghan, Sichuan) near the Shu capital Chengdu. Around this time, when Liu Shan held a discussion with his subjects on what options they had, some suggested that they flee to their ally state Wu while others proposed retreating southward into the Nanzhong region (covering parts of present-day southern Sichuan, Yunnan and Guizhou).

Liu Shan ultimately heeded Qiao Zhou's suggestion to give up resistance and surrender to Deng Ai. One of Liu Shan's sons, Liu Chen, had strongly advocated making a last stand against Deng Ai. However, after Liu Shan decided to surrender, Liu Chen went to the ancestral temple of his grandfather Liu Bei and cried his heart out. He then killed his wife and children before committing suicide.

Liu Shan wrote a surrender document as follows:

"Just as the Yangtze and Han rivers divide this vast expanse of land, a deep and wide chasm has come to separate us from the Central Plains. While we held our ground in these lands of Shu, remaining in this remote corner, we defied the will of Heaven and the might of Wei; yet, as time passed, we drifted ever further—tens of thousands of li—away from the Imperial Capital. I recall the Huangchu era, when Emperor Wen of Wei dispatched the general Xianyu Fu to convey an imperial edict filled with warm and sincere words. It demonstrated great goodwill toward us, expressing a generous intent to throw wide the gates of the Imperial Court should we offer unconditional surrender. Though the benevolence and righteousness of this offer were clear, I—alas—was a man of meager virtue. Unable to correctly assess the situation before me, I clung stubbornly to the regime left by my predecessor—a regime flickering like a candle in the wind—and continued to reject the Court's efforts to guide us. When Heaven unleashes its mighty wrath, all things have no choice but to bow before its irresistible power. The Imperial army displays its majestic might, striking awe into the hearts of the people wherever it marches. Witnessing such a spectacle, who could fail to be won over by that absolute power and magnanimity, or fail to offer their submission? I have already issued orders for my officers and soldiers to lay down their arms and doff their armor; for officials to leave the treasures and supplies in the government storehouses untouched; for the people to assemble outside their respective cities and villages; and for crops to be left standing in the fields. We await the Court's grace and mercy, and we earnestly pray that the people of Shu may once again regain their peaceful lives. I humbly kowtow before the Great Wei Empire and earnestly pray that, aided by wise ministers akin to Yi Yin and the Duke of Zhou, you may govern the realm with unshakeable virtue—extending your benevolence far beyond the borders of your dominion. To this end, I dispatch my trusted aides—Palace Attendant Zhang Shao, Grand Master of the Palace Qiao Zhou, and Commandant of the Imperial Son-in-Law Deng Liang—to surrender my Imperial Seal and silk ribbon to you as a token of my unconditional surrender and sincere submission. I leave the decision regarding the honors to be accorded to my late predecessor entirely to your discretion and await your decree. The fate of myself and my people now rests in your hands, General. As the coffin lies close at hand, I shall elaborate no further on the matter."

As instructed, Zhang Shao, Qiao Zhou and Deng Liang brought the surrender document and Liu Shan's imperial seal to Deng Ai at Luo County. Deng Ai was so pleased to receive the surrender document and imperial seal that he reported victory to the Wei government and sent Zhang Shao and Deng Liang back to Chengdu. At the same time, Liu Shan also instructed Zhang Jun (張峻) and others to relay his orders throughout the Shu territories to surrender to Wei, and sent Jiang Xian to order Jiang Wei to surrender to Zhong Hui at Fu County. He then sent Li Hu (李虎) to present to Deng Ai a record book containing demographic and other statistical data about Shu. According to the records, Shu had 280,000 households, a population of 940,000, an army of 120,000, 40,000 officials, over 400,000 hu of grain, 2,000 jin of gold, 2,000 jin of silver, and 400,000 rolls of brocade and coloured silk.

When Deng Ai and his troops arrived at the north gate of Chengdu, Liu Shan tied himself up and brought along a coffin as he led an entourage of over 60 people to officially surrender to Deng Ai. Deng Ai burnt the coffin, freed Liu Shan from his bonds and treated him kindly. Using the acting imperial authority granted to him by the Wei government, Deng Ai appointed Liu Shan as acting General of Chariots of Cavalry (驃騎將軍) and granted other titles to surrendered Shu nobles and officials. He allowed Liu Shan to continue living in his palace and even visited Liu Shan and his family later. At the same time, he forbid his troops from plundering and pillaging Chengdu, and ordered that daily activities in the city resume as per normal. The people of Shu were very impressed with Deng Ai's generosity and kindness; some Shu officials even became his subordinates.

Deng Ai appointed Shi Zuan as the Inspector of Yi Province and put Qian Hong in charge of overseeing the newly submitted Shu commanderies. He also ordered the construction of a memorial at Mianzhu to glorify his victory and had the fallen Wei soldiers buried there alongside their Shu counterparts.

=== Jiang Wei's surrender ===
Meanwhile, the Shu forces under Jiang Wei received confusing information about the situation in Chengdu. Some said that Liu Shan wanted to remain in Chengdu and defend the city, while others claimed that the Shu emperor was going to abandon Chengdu and flee south to Jianning Commandery (建寧郡; covering parts of present-day Yunnan and Guizhou). Jiang Wei thus prepared to lead his troops to Qi County (郪縣; present-day Santai County, Sichuan), which was nearer to Chengdu, to verify the truth. Just then, they received orders from Chengdu to lay down their arms and surrender to Zhong Hui at Fu County. Many Shu soldiers felt so shocked and angry when they heard of their emperor's surrender that they drew their swords and slashed at rocks to vent their frustration.

When Zhong Hui finally met Jiang Wei, he asked him: "Why are you late?" With a solemn expression on his face and tears streaming down his cheeks, Jiang Wei replied: "Our meeting today came too early." Zhong Hui was impressed by Jiang Wei's response.

=== Wu reinforcements ===
Between 18 November and 17 December 263, (Note: Sun Xiu's biography in the Sanguozhi recorded that Shu requested support from Wu in the 10th month of the 6th year of the Yong'an era of Sun Xiu's reign. This month corresponds to 18 November to 17 December 263 in the Gregorian calendar. Sun Xiu's biography also recorded that Sun Xiu ordered Ding Feng, Liu Ping, Ding Fēng and Sun Yi to lead Wu forces to attack Wei territories on the jiashen day after the 10th month of the 6th year of the Yong'an era. The closest jiashen day after the 10th month is the 22nd day of the 11th month, which corresponds to 8 January 264 in the Gregorian calendar.) the Shu government had made an urgent request for support from their ally state, Wu, in the east. On 8 January 264, the Wu emperor Sun Xiu ordered five officers to lead three separate forces to attack Wei territories in the hope of diverting Wei attention away from Shu: Ding Feng to attack Shouchun (壽春; present-day Shou County, Anhui); Liu Ping and Shi Ji to attack Nan Commandery (南郡; around present-day Jingzhou, Hubei); and Ding Fēng and Sun Yi to attack Wei territories along the middle Mian River. The Wu forces pulled back when they received news of the fall of Shu.

== Aftermath ==
=== Deng Ai's arrest and downfall ===
Feeling proud of his achievements, Deng Ai became very arrogant and boastful as he took control of and oversaw the post-war Shu territories. Around February 264, he wrote to Sima Zhao to suggest ideas to conquer Wei's other rival state, Wu. When Sima Zhao told him that his proposal had to be discussed in the imperial court before approval, Deng Ai grew impatient and hinted that he was justified in ignoring standard protocol and behaving autocratically as long as he acted in Wei's interests. Zhong Hui, who secretly desired to rebel against Wei, used the opportunity to exploit and manipulate Deng Ai's arrogance to great effect. After intercepting a report from Deng Ai to the Wei imperial court, he imitated Deng Ai's handwriting and edited the report to make it sound rude and demanding. He also destroyed a letter from Sima Zhao to Deng Ai.

In late February 264, the Wei imperial court ordered Zhong Hui and Wei Guan to arrest Deng Ai, relieve him of his command, and send him back to Luoyang in a prison cart. On or after 3 March 264, Wei Guan sent Tian Xu to lead soldiers to intercept and kill Deng Ai, his son Deng Zhong and subordinate Shi Zuan at the west of Mianzhu.

=== Zhong Hui's rebellion ===
After Deng Ai was arrested and taken away, Zhong Hui assumed overall command of the Wei forces occupying the newly-conquered Shu territories. At Jiang Wei's instigation, he decided to start a rebellion against Sima Zhao, and came up with a strategy to attack Luoyang with Jiang Wei's assistance.

On 1 March 264, a day after arriving in Chengdu, Zhong Hui summoned all the high-ranking Wei officers to attend a meeting and showed them a fake imperial decree ordering them to rise up against Sima Zhao and overthrow him. However, he became worried that the officers were unwilling to support him so he instructed his close aides to seize command of the officers' units and detain the officers. On 3 March, when there were rumours that Zhong Hui wanted to purge all the officers who refused to participate in the rebellion, the detained officers broke out of captivity, regrouped with their units, and launched a mutiny against Zhong Hui. Chaos broke out in Chengdu and hundreds of people were killed. Zhong Hui and Jiang Wei fought the mutinying soldiers but were ultimately overwhelmed and killed.

=== Wu invasion of Badong ===
During the Wei invasion of Shu, the Shu general Yan Yu (閻宇), who was in charge of guarding Badong Commandery (巴東郡; covering parts of present-day Chongqing), received orders to lead troops from Badong to support the Shu forces at the frontline. Yan Yu's deputy, Luo Xian, remained behind with only 2,000 troops to guard Yong'an (永安; present-day Fengjie County, Chongqing), the capital of Badong Commandery.

In November or December 263, when news of Chengdu's fall reached Yong'an, Luo Xian managed to calm down the people and restore order and stability in Yong'an. After receiving news confirming that Liu Shan had indeed surrendered to Wei, Luo Xian gathered all his troops and mourned the fall of Shu for three days.

In the meantime, Wu prepared to take advantage of the situation to invade Shu and seize control of former Shu territories under the pretext of sending reinforcements to help Shu resist the Wei invaders. Around March 264, the Wu general Bu Xie led troops from Xiling (西陵; present-day Yichang, Hubei) to attack Yong'an but encountered strong resistance from Luo Xian and his men. As the Wu forces rained arrows on his position, Luo Xian ordered his subordinate Yang Zong (楊宗) to break out of the siege and seek help from Wei. He also surrendered his tallies and sent his son as a hostage to convince the Wei regent Sima Zhao of his sincerity. During this time, he led his men to strike back at the Wu forces and defeated them.

Enraged at Bu Xie's defeat, the Wu emperor Sun Xiu ordered his general Lu Kang to lead 30,000 troops to support Bu Xie and besiege Yong'an. After a six-month-long siege, more than half of Yong'an's population fell sick from infectious diseases. Just then, the Wei general Hu Lie led reinforcements from Jing Province to help Luo Xian and lift the siege on Yong'an. The Wu forces retreated upon seeing the arrival of Wei reinforcements. Sima Zhao accepted Luo Xian's surrender and ordered him to remain behind and continue guarding Yong'an.

== Order of battle ==
=== Wei forces ===
- Grand Chief Controller (大都督) Sima Zhao, the regent of Wei, oversaw the entire campaign from the Wei capital Luoyang.
- General Who Guards the West (鎮西將軍) Zhong Hui led an army of over 100,000 to attack Shu from the eastern flank.
  - Official of Justice (廷尉卿) Wei Guan served as an acting military judge under Zhong Hui. He also received imperial authority to supervise Zhong Hui and Deng Ai's military operations.
  - Chief Clerk (長史) Du Yu
  - General of the Vanguard (前將軍) Li Fu (李輔) led a detachment of 10,000 troops to attack Lecheng County.
  - Army Protector (護軍) Xun Kai (荀愷) led a detachment of 10,000 troops to attack Hancheng County.
  - Army Protector (護軍) Hu Lie led the vanguard force to attack Yang'an Pass.
  - (executed) Officer of the Standard (牙門將) Xu Yi oversaw the construction of a road leading into Shu. He was executed for failing his mission when the road turned out to be poorly built.
  - Tian Zhang (田章) accompanied Deng Ai on his detour through the shortcut to Mianzhu.
  - General Who Pacifies Bandits (平寇將軍) Pang Hui
  - Army Protector (護軍) Tian Xu
- Inspector of Yong Province (雍州刺史) Zhuge Xu led an army of 30,000 to attack Shu from the central flank.
- General Who Attacks the West (征西將軍) Deng Ai led an army of 30,000 to attack Shu from the western flank.
  - Deng Zhong led the attack on Mianzhu.
  - Major (司馬) Shi Zuan (師纂), a former registrar under Sima Zhao. He was reassigned to serve in Deng Ai's army. He led the attack on Mianzhu.
- Administrator of Weixing (魏興太守) Liu Qin (劉欽) led troops from Weixing Commandery to attack Hanzhong Commandery via the Ziwu Valley.
- Administrator of Tianshui (天水太守) Wang Qi led troops from Tianshui Commandery to attack Tazhong.
- Administrator of Longxi (隴西太守) Qian Hong led troops from Longxi Commandery to attack Tazhong.
- Administrator of Jincheng (金城太守) Yang Xin (楊欣) led troops from Jincheng Commandery to attack Gansong.

=== Shu forces ===
- (surrendered) General-in-Chief (大將軍) Jiang Wei led the Shu defences at Tazhong before he retreated to Yinping and then to Jiange.
  - (surrendered) Right General of Chariots and Cavalry (右車騎將軍) Liao Hua led reinforcements to support Jiang Wei at Tazhong and Yinping before retreating to Jiange together with him.
  - (surrendered) Left General of Chariots and Cavalry (左車騎將軍) Zhang Yi led reinforcements to join Jiang Wei at Jiange.
  - (surrendered) Senior General Who Assists the State (輔國大將軍) Dong Jue led reinforcements to join Jiang Wei at Jiange.
- † Left General of the Household (左中郎將) Fu Qian guarded Yang'an Pass.
  - (surrendered) Jiang Shu (蔣舒) defected to Wei forces and assisted them in capturing Yang'an Pass.
- Army Inspector (監軍) Wang Han (王含) led 5,000 troops to guard Lecheng County.
- (surrendered) General of Pacifying Martial Might (綏武將軍) Jiang Bin led 5,000 troops to guard Hancheng County.
- (surrendered) Administrator of Jiangyou (江油太守) Ma Miao (馬邈) guarded Jiangyou.
- † General Who Protects the Army (護軍將軍) Zhuge Zhan guarded Mianzhu.
  - † Zhuge Shang
  - † Master of Writing (尚書) Huang Chong
  - † Master of Writing (尚書) Zhang Zun
  - † Right Commander of the Yulin Imperial Guards (羽林右部督) Li Qiu
- Right General-in-Chief (右大將軍) Yan Yu (閻宇) led reinforcements from Badong Commandery to defend Chengdu.
  - (surrendered) Army Commandant (領軍) Luo Xian defended Yong'an County from a Wu invasion after the fall of Shu.
    - Yang Zong (楊宗) was sent by Luo Xian to seek reinforcements from Wei in defending Yong'an from Wu.

=== Wu forces ===
- General-in-Chief (大將軍) Ding Feng led Wu forces to attack Shouchun and divert Wei attention away from Shu.
  - Liu Ping led Wu forces to attack Nan Commandery.
  - Upper General-in-Chief (上大將軍) Shi Ji led Wu forces to attack Nan Commandery.
  - General of the Rear (後將軍) Ding Fēng led Wu forces to attack Wei territories along the middle Mian River.
  - Sun Yi led Wu forces to attack Wei territories along the middle Mian River.
- General Who Pacifies the Army (撫軍將軍) Bu Xie led Wu forces to attack Yong'an County after the fall of Shu.
- General Who Guards the Army (鎮軍將軍) Lu Kang led 30,000 troops to reinforce Bu Xie.

== In popular culture ==
Mie Shu Ji (滅蜀記; literally: The Tale of the Destruction of Shu; ISBN 9789867480972) is a 2008 novel by Li Bo (李柏) that dramatises the events leading to the fall of Shu, with Jiang Wei, Deng Ai and Zhong Hui as the central characters.
