= Fu Rong (Three Kingdoms) =

Military officer of Shu Han state (died 222)

Fu Rong 傅肜
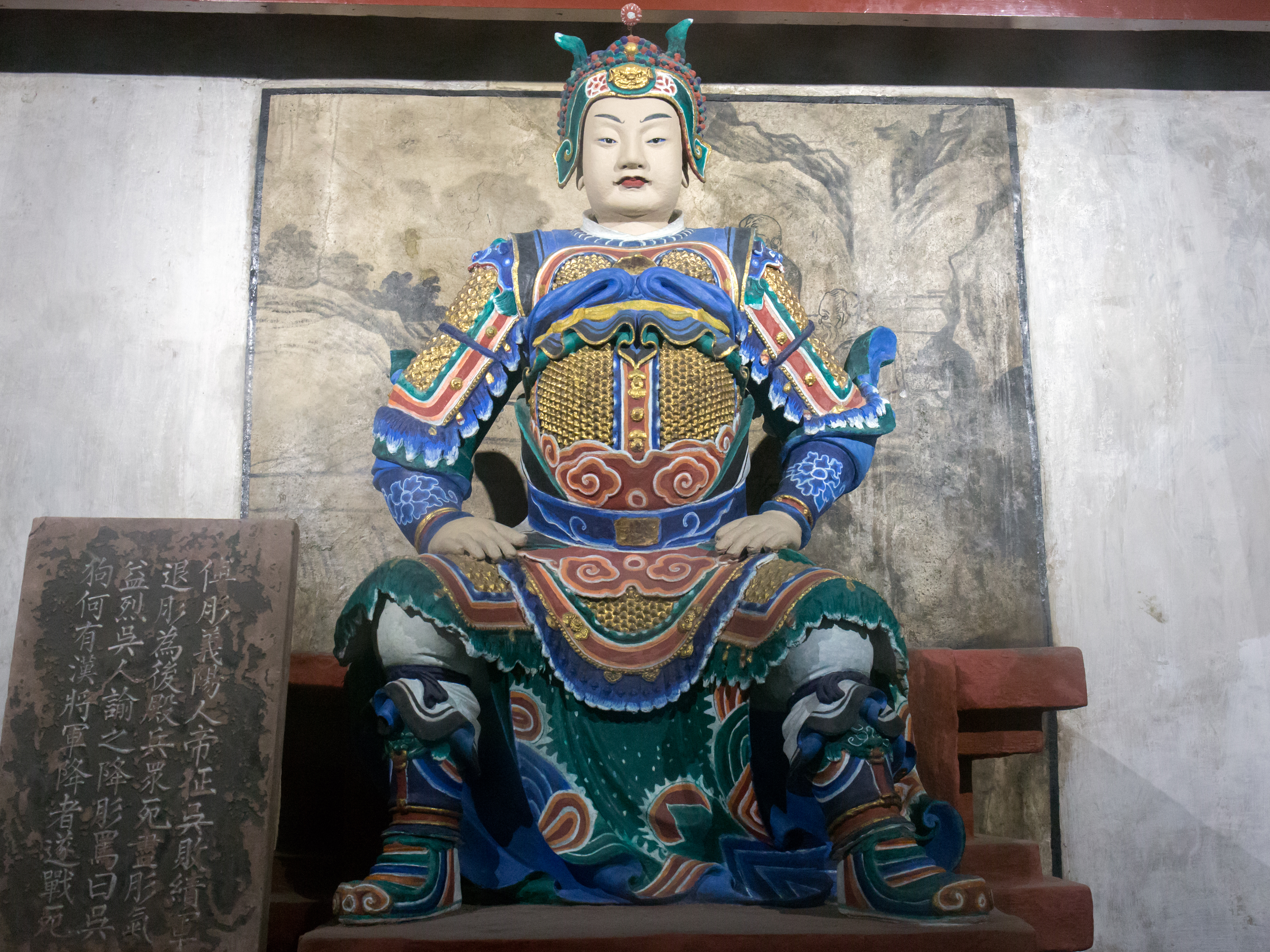
- Statue of Fu Rong in the Zhao Lie Temple in Chengdu, Sichuan
- Born: Unknown; Xinyang, Henan
- Died: 222; Yichang, Hubei
- Occupation: Military general
- Children: Fu Qian

Fu Rong (died 222 A.D.) was a Chinese military general of the state of Shu Han during the Three Kingdoms period of China.

== Life ==
Fu Rong was from Yiyang Commandery, which is in present-day Xinyang, Henan. In 221, he followed Liu Bei in the campaign against Sun Quan's forces, leading to the Battle of Xiaoting. In 222, Sun Quan's general Lu Xun defeated Liu Bei's forces at Xiaoting and Yiling and forced them to retreat. Fu Rong volunteered to cover the rear during the Shu retreat. He continued to hold his ground firmly and vent his fury on the enemy even though all his comrades had already been killed. When the Wu soldiers offered him a chance to surrender, he replied, "Dogs of Wu! How could a Han general ever surrender?" He was eventually killed in action. Emperor Wu, the founding emperor of the Jin dynasty, specifically mentioned this incident in his decree.

Fu Rong's son, Fu Qian, continued serving Shu as a military general until his death during the conquest of Shu by Wei in 263.

== In Romance of the Three Kingdoms ==
In the 14th-century historical novel Romance of the Three Kingdoms, Fu Rong is renamed Fu Tong (Chinese: 傅彤). After Liu Bei's defeat at the Battle of Xiaoting, Fu Rong volunteers to cover the rear from pursuing enemy troops. He is eventually surrounded by the enemy. The Wu general Ding Feng shouts at him: "Many Shu soldiers have died while others have surrendered. Your lord Liu Bei has been captured. Now that you are exhausted and isolated, why don't you surrender early?" Fu Rong replies sternly: "I am an officer of (Shu) Han, how can I surrender to the dogs of Wu?", after which he grabs his spear, mounts his horse, and leads his men to make a last stand. However, after fighting for more than 100 rounds, Fu Rong is unable to break out of the encirclement. After sighing "I have come to my end!", he vomits blood and dies.

== See also ==
- Lists of people of the Three Kingdoms
