= Ma Long (Jin dynasty) =

3rd century Cao Wei and Jin dynasty general

- 馬隆

Prefect of Xiping (西平太守)
- In office 280–?
- Monarchs: Emperor Wu of Jin, Emperor Hui of Jin (Note: Ma Long's biography in Book of Jin recorded that he was briefly relieved as Prefect of Xiping during the reign of Emperor Hui, but was later reinstated.)

Personal details
- Born: Unknown Wenshang County, Shandong
- Died: Unknown Xining, Qinghai
- Children: Ma Xian
- Courtesy name: Xiaoxing (孝興)
- Peerage: Marquis of Fenggao County (奉高縣侯)

Ma Long (fl. 249–290), courtesy name Xiaoxing was a politician and military general of Cao Wei during the Three Kingdoms period and Western Jin dynasty period. He was most known for ending Tufa Shujineng's Rebellion in early 280, during which he employed unorthodox tactics to defeat the rebels. After the end of the Three Kingdoms, he was made Prefect of Xiping Commandery (西平郡; around present-day Xining, Qinghai) and served the office for more than ten years. He maintained peace in Liang province and was popular among the non-Han people living there.

== Early career ==
Ma Long was a native of Pinglu County (平陸縣; in present-day Wenshang County, Shandong), Dongping State (東平國). From a young age, he was described as both wise and strong, and he liked to conduct himself with honor and integrity. He began his career as a minor officer in Yan province.

In June 251, after the failure of Wang Ling's Rebellion, the coffin of Linghu Yu (令狐愚), a nephew and co-conspirator of Wang Ling who died about two years before the rebellion, was opened for his body to be displayed in the marketplace. No one in Yan province dared to bury his body, but after three days, Ma Long, who falsely claimed that he was a retainer of Linghu, spent his wealth to have him reburied. Ma Long then mourned him for three years, even planting pine and cypress trees on the side of his grave. After completing his mourning period, Ma Long returned home and became a subject of praise in Yan. (Note: The Jin Ji by Gan Bao had a similar record, but indicated that Ma's actions caused the shi of Yan Province to be ashamed of themselves.)

Ma Long was later appointed as Assistant Officer for Military Affairs. In January or February 270, Emperor Wu of Jin sent out edicts to every province looking for talents to help in his subjugation of the Western Jin's rival state, Eastern Wu. The people of Yan recommended Ma Long, and he grew to become a Marshal-Commander.

== Tufa Shujineng's Rebellion ==
In 270, a tribal revolt led by the Xianbei chieftain, Tufa Shujineng broke out in Qin and Liang provinces. In 278, Ma Long submitted a petition warning that the Inspector of Liang, Yang Xin, had lost the support of the Qiang and Rong tribes and was going to be defeated. As Ma Long predicted, Yang Xin was defeated and killed by Shujineng and his tribal allies at Wuwei Commandery (武威郡; in present-day Jingyuan County, Gansu) in c.July that year. (Note: Emperor Wu's biography in Book of Jin recorded that Yang Xin was defeated and killed in the 6th month of the 4th year of the Xian'ning era; the month corresponds to 7 Jul to 5 Aug 278 on the Julian calendar.) In early 279, Shujineng captured Liang, causing much worry for Emperor Wu. (Note: Emperor Wu's biography in Book of Jin, and vol.80 of Zizhi Tongjian both recorded that Liang Province fell in the 1st month of the 5th year the Xian'ning era and that Ma Long, as Protector-General Who Campaigns Against The Caitiffs, was given the order to reclaim Liang Province on the yi'chou day of that month (30 January 279 on the Julian calendar). However, that day was also the start of the new month (year) and so could be an erroneous entry; the word "shuo" (朔), used to denote the start of a new month, is absent. The actual day where the order was given was probably the ji'chou (己丑) day of that month; it was the 25th day of that month and corresponds to 23 Feb 279 in the Julian calendar).)

Emperor Wu held a court session where he asked if anyone could solve the crisis in Liang, but none of the ministers could provide an answer. Just then, Ma Long, only a junior general at this point, stepped forward and volunteered. When Emperor Wu asked about his plans, Ma Long only requested to be allowed to recruit around 3,000 strong men, no matter their background. The emperor agreed and appointed Ma Long as Protector-General Who Campaigns Against The Caitiffs and Administrator of Wuwei, despite objections from his ministers due to Ma Long's lowly status.

Ma Long sought out men who were able to draw bows that were four juns (approx. 26 kilograms) and use 'waist-spun crossbows' (腰引弩) that were 36 juns (approx. 238 kilograms). He set up targets for the men to practice their accuracy, and in the end, he found around 3,500 recruits. Ma Long also wanted to have access to the military arsenal. However, the Prefect of the Arsenal disliked him, so he was only provided with worn-out equipments. The two argued with each other, and the Palace Assistant of the Imperial Secretaries sent a petition blaming the incident on Ma Long. Ma Long explained the actual situation to Emperor Wu, and the emperor ordered for Ma Long to be given a three-year supply of military equipments. In November 279, Ma Long set out west and crossed the Wen River (溫水; east of present-day Jingyuan County, Gansu).

When Shujineng heard that Ma Long was attacking, he led tens of thousands of his soldiers to occupy the passes to block Ma Long's front while the others set up ambushes to block Ma Long's rear. During his battles with Shujineng, Ma Long employed a number of unorthodox and questionable tactics. In accordance with Zhuge Liang's 'Eightfold Battle Formations' (八陣圖), he built ‘flat box carts’ (偏箱車; a cart with a board on one side which acts like a shield) for his soldiers. When fighting in the open, he employed 'deer-antlered carts' (鹿角車; a cart with spears and halberds on the front, giving it an antler-like shape), and when passing through narrow roads, he built wooden roofs over the carts. His soldiers were able to move while fighting, and the enemies' arrows were unable to hit them. Another tactic that he allegedly used was placing down large amounts of 'magnetic stones' on the ground to slow down the enemy advances, the reason being that the rebels and their horses often wore iron armor while Ma Long's men wore armor made of rhinoceros hides. The rebels were taken by surprise and thought of the Jin soldiers as divine beings. (Note: While Sima Guang was skeptical of the usage of "magnetic stones", Hu Sanxing himself found it credible even as he included Sima's opinions in his annotation of Tongjian.)

For a while, the imperial court did not receive any news from the west, and there were speculations that Ma Long was dead. However, on one night, Ma Long's messenger arrived at the court, dispelling the rumours of his death. The next morning, Emperor Wu summoned his ministers and said to them, "If I had listened to your words, we would have lost Liang". Emperor Wu then granted Ma Long a staff of authority and appointed him General Who Exhibits Might.

Ma Long and his men travelled a long distance, killing and wounding many rebels as they marched. When they reached Wuwei Commandery, he received the surrender of Cubahan (猝跋韓) and Juwanneng (且萬能) along with 10,000 soldiers under them. In January or February 280, Ma Long, with the help of Meiguneng (沒骨能) and other friendly tribal leaders, ended the rebellion after a great victory over Shujineng. Shujineng was killed in battle, although another account states that after Shujineng was defeated, he was assassinated by his subordinates, who then submitted to Ma Long. (Note: Meanwhile, the invasion of Wu was proceeding; Sun Hao would surrender on 1 May that year.)

== Later career ==
In 280, the court appointed Ma Long as Protector of the Army Who Pacifies the Barbarians and Prefect of Xiping Commandery. He was given his own General of the Standard and elite troops to stabilize and rebuild Xiping, which had been abandoned during the rebellion. At the time, a foreign barbarian, Chengxi (成奚), had a stronghold south of Xiping and would constantly attack Jin's border. Ma Long led his troops to attack him, and Chengxi held fast to his defences. In response, Ma Long ordered his soldiers to carry farming tools and plough the fields. Chengxi thought that Ma Long had no intention in subjugating him and so relaxed his guard. Ma Long capitalized on Chengxi's mistake by quickly attacking and defeating him. For the rest of Ma Long's tenure in Xiping, the foreign barbarians did not threaten the border.

In 290, (Note: The Tai'xi era of Emperor Wu's reign lasted for only one year as Emperor Wu died in May that year; the year starts from 28 Jan 290 in the Julian calendar.) Ma Long was awarded the title of Marquis of Fenggao County and appointed Colonel of the Eastern Qiang for his services. Ma Long was stationed in Longyou region (隴右, modern southern Gansu) for more than ten years, and during that time, he established a highly respected reputation in the area. The Prefect of Lüeyang, Yan Shu (嚴舒), wanted to have Ma Long's position as Prefect of Xiping. Using his close connection to the powerful minister, Yang Jun, he slandered Ma Long to Yang Jun, claiming that he was too old and senile, and thus no longer fit for his position. He was recalled to the capital while Yan Shu was given his position. However, the Qiang and Di people soon began gathering in large numbers. The inhabitants of Longyou were startled, and the court feared that another rebellion was going to break out. Therefore, Ma Long was reinstated as Prefect of Xiping, and he would hold the office up to his death.
