= Fu Qian =

Chinese state of Shu Han general (died 263)

- 傅僉
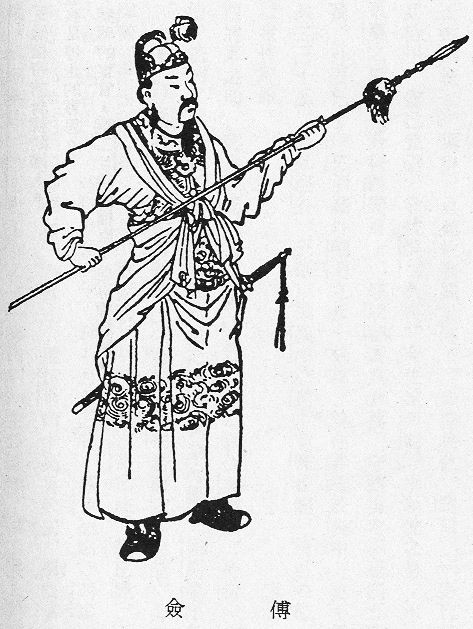
- A Qing dynasty illustration of Fu Qian

Area Commander of Guanzhong (關中都督)
- In office ? – 263
- Monarch: Liu Shan

Left General of the Household (左中郎將)
- In office ?–?
- Monarch: Liu Shan

Personal details
- Born: Unknown; Xinyang, Henan
- Died: 263; Ningqiang County, Shaanxi
- Children: Fu Zhu; Fu Mu
- Parent: Fu Rong (father)
- Occupation: Military general

Fu Qian (died late 263) was a Chinese military general of the state of Shu Han in the Three Kingdoms period of China. He was a son of Fu Rong.

== Life ==
Fu Qian was from Yiyang commandery, which is in present-day Xinyang, Henan. His father, Fu Rong, was killed in action during the Battle of Xiaoting in 222 against Sun Quan's forces. Fu Qian inherited his father's official position and served Shu as General of the Household of the Left (左中郎將), before being promoted to Area Commander (都督) of Guanzhong.

In late 263, during the campaign on Shu by the rival state of Cao Wei, Fu Qian was sent into battle to resist the enemy. At that time, many people praised Fu Qian and his father as "loyal and righteous for over generations" (奕世忠義). Fu Qian was tasked to defend Yangping Pass while Jiang Shu (蔣舒) was sent to engage the enemy. However, Jiang Shu surrendered to the enemy by opening the gates and letting them in. The Wei general Hu Lie (胡烈) led his troops to attack Fu Qian's position. Fu Qian was eventually killed in the futile attempt to drive out the enemy.

Fu Qian's sons. Fu Zhu (傅著) and Fu Mu (傅募) were employed during the Jin dynasty following a memorial written by Wen Li appealing Sima Yan (Emperor Wu of Jin) to act with clemency toward the descendants of former Shu Han officials.

== In Romance of the Three Kingdoms ==
In the 14th-century historical novel Romance of the Three Kingdoms, Fu Qian was a trusted general serving under Jiang Wei. Following an attack by Wei forces at Yangping Pass, Fu Qian defended it with his greatest of skills. However, Fu Qian's comrade Jiang Shu (蔣舒) eventually surrendered, and this led to Fu Qian's death in the midst of combat.

== See also ==
- Lists of people of the Three Kingdoms
