= Su Ze =

Chinese Cao Wei state official (died 223)

- 蘇則

Chancellor of Dongping (東平相)
- In office 223
- Monarch: Cao Pi

Palace Attendant (侍中)
- In office 220 – 223
- Monarch: Cao Pi

Colonel Who Protects the Qiang (護羌校尉)
- In office 220
- Monarch: Emperor Xian of Han
- Chancellor: Cao Pi

Administrator of Jincheng (金城太守)
- In office c. 215 – 220
- Monarch: Emperor Xian of Han
- Chancellor: Cao Cao / Cao Pi

Administrator of Wudu (武都太守)
- In office ? – c. 215
- Monarch: Emperor Xian of Han
- Chancellor: Cao Cao

Administrator of Anding (安定太守)
- In office ?–?
- Monarch: Emperor Xian of Han

Administrator of Jiuquan (酒泉太守)
- In office ?–?
- Monarch: Emperor Xian of Han

Personal details
- Born: Unknown Mei County, Shaanxi
- Died: 223
- Children: Su Yi; Su Yu
- Occupation: Official
- Courtesy name: Wenshi (文師)
- Posthumous name: Marquis Gang (剛侯)
- Peerage: Marquis of a Chief Village (都亭侯)

Su Ze (died 223), courtesy name Wenshi, was an official of the state of Cao Wei during the Three Kingdoms period of China. Born in the late Eastern Han dynasty, he started his career as the Administrator of various commanderies in northwest China and is best known for governing Jincheng Commandery (covering parts of present-day Gansu and Qinghai) between 215 and 220. During his tenure, he rebuilt the war-torn commandery, gained the support of local non-Han Chinese tribes, opened up trade along the Hexi Corridor, and suppressed rebellions in the neighbouring Xiping, Wuwei, Jiuquan and Zhangye commanderies. After the end of the Eastern Han dynasty, Su Ze served in the Cao Wei state under its first ruler, Cao Pi, as a Palace Attendant. An upright and outspoken man, he did not hesitate to speak up when he disagreed with Cao Pi, who became wary of him. In 223, Su Ze died of illness while travelling to present-day Shandong to assume a new appointment.

== Early life ==
Su Ze was from Wugong County (武功縣), Fufeng Commandery (扶風郡), which is located east of present-day Mei County, Shaanxi. He was a descendant of Su Chun (蘇純) and Su Zhang (蘇章). In his younger days, he was known for being studious and had been nominated as a xiaolian (孝廉) and maocai (茂才) by the officials in Fufeng Commandery. However, he turned down offers to join the civil service. An upright and outspoken man, he was also known for his abhorrence of villainy and for being a strong admirer of Ji An (汲黯; died 112 BCE), a Western Han dynasty official who was famous for his upright character.

Around 195, when a famine broke out in the Guanzhong region, Su Ze fled from Fufeng Commandery to the neighbouring Anding Commandery (安定郡; around present-day Zhenyuan County, Gansu) and took refuge under a wealthy man, Shi Liang (師亮). When Shi Liang treated him with contempt, Su Ze sighed and swore that he would return one day as the Administrator (太守) of Anding Commandery and take revenge against Shi Liang. Around 200, he first returned to Fufeng Commandery but later decided to travel with his friend, Ji Mao (吉茂), to Mount Taibai, where they settled down temporarily and spent their time reading.

== Service under the Eastern Han dynasty ==
When Su Ze finally decided to enter government service later, he was immediately propelled into office as the Administrator of Jiuquan Commandery. He was subsequently reassigned to Anding Commandery and then Wudu Commandery (武都郡; around present-day Longnan, Gansu). He gained quite a reputation while during his tenures. When Shi Liang, the wealthy man in Anding Commandery who scorned Su Ze years ago, heard that Su Ze had become the commandery's Administrator, he immediately packed up and prepared to flee. However, Su Ze sent a messenger to stop Shi Liang and reassure him that everything was fine. Su Ze even asked the messenger to thank Shi Liang for offering him shelter during the Guanzhong famine.

In 215, Cao Cao, the warlord who controlled the Han central government and the figurehead Emperor Xian, led his forces on a campaign against a rival warlord, Zhang Lu, in Hanzhong Commandery. Along the way, he passed by Wudu Commandery and was so impressed with Su Ze that he asked Su Ze to be his guide on the campaign against Zhang Lu.

=== As the Administrator of Jincheng ===
After the Battle of Yangping in 215, Su Ze went to Xiabian County (下辨縣; northwest of present-day Cheng County, Gansu) to pacify the local Di tribes and to open up trade along the Hexi Corridor. He was subsequently reassigned to be the Administrator of Jincheng Commandery (金城郡; around present-day Yuzhong County, Gansu).

At the time, Jincheng Commandery and its surrounding areas had been ravaged by war in the previous years, so its population had drastically fallen as people were displaced from their homes and forced to seek shelter elsewhere. Many of them also suffered from poverty and hunger. After assuming office, Su Ze took careful steps to rebuild Jincheng Commandery. He first negotiated the terms for peaceful co-existence with the local non-Han Chinese tribes, such as the Di and Qiang, and made arrangements to purchase livestock from them. He then distributed the livestock among the refugees to help them regain their means of livelihood. He also opened up the official granaries and shared half of the food supplies with the people. Within a month, a few thousand refugee families returned to Jincheng Commandery. Su Ze also established a legal system to maintain law and order in Jincheng Commandery. Those who broke the laws were punished while those who followed the laws were rewarded. He also went to the fields and taught the people how to farm and grow crops. After Jincheng Commandery had a bountiful harvest that year, more people came and settled down there.

When Li Yue (李越) started a rebellion in the neighbouring Longxi Commandery (隴西郡; around present-day Longxi County, Gansu), the Di and Qiang tribes supported Su Ze and assisted him in suppressing the revolt. Li Yue surrendered after he was surrounded.

After Cao Cao died in March 220, Qu Yan (麴演) started a rebellion in Xiping Commandery (西平郡; around present-day Xining, Qinghai). When Su Ze heard about it, he led troops from Jincheng Commandery to quell the revolt. A fearful Qu Yan surrendered to Su Ze. Cao Cao's son and successor Cao Pi, who became the new de facto head of the Han central government, granted Su Ze the additional appointment of Colonel Who Protects the Qiang (護羌校尉) and enfeoffed him as a Secondary Marquis (關內侯) as a reward for his success in putting down the rebellion.

Cao Pi, however, was initially reluctant to make Su Ze a marquis even though he acknowledged that Su Ze did an excellent job in governing Jincheng Commandery. He secretly sought the opinion of Su Ze's superior Zhang Ji, the Inspector of Yong Province, on this issue. In his reply to Cao Pi, Zhang Ji listed out Su Ze's various achievements – rebuilding a war-torn Jincheng Commandery, gaining the support of the Di and Qiang tribes, quelling Qu Yan's revolt, etc. – and advised Cao Pi to award Su Ze a marquis title to honour him for his loyalty and contributions.

=== Suppressing rebellions in western China ===
Around June 220, Qu Yan (麴演) rebelled again in Xiping Commandery and managed to garner support in two neighbouring commanderies, Zhangye and Jiuquan. His allies, Zhang Jin (張進) and Huang Hua (黃華), rebelled against Du Tong (杜通) and Xin Ji (辛機), the Administrators of Zhangye and Jiuquan respectively, and declared themselves the new Administrators. Zhang Jin even took Du Tong hostage. To make things worse, the non-Han Chinese tribes in Wuwei Commandery seized the opportunity to start raiding and pillaging counties, while other local elites (both Han Chinese and non-Han Chinese) throughout Yong and Liang provinces wanted to jump on the bandwagon and join the rebels. The rebellions caused a major disruption in trade flows along the Hexi Corridor. Guanqiu Xing (毌丘興), the Administrator of Wuwei Commandery, sent an urgent report to Su Ze in Jincheng Commandery and sought his aid in dealing with the rebels. At the time, Su Ze had with him two military officers, Hao Zhao and Wei Ping (魏平), who were in command of Jincheng Commandery's armed forces. However, they were not allowed to lead the troops into battle without authorisation from the Han central government.

Su Ze called for a meeting with Hao Zhao, Wei Ping, his subordinates and his Qiang allies to discuss how to deal with the rebellions. He told them: "Although the rebels have superiority in numbers, they are nothing more than a motley crowd. As some of them have been forced to join the rebellion, they aren't necessarily as united as they seem. We should exploit their differences and make them split into 'good' and 'bad' camps. We shall then induce those in the 'good' camp to join us. This will boost our numbers and reduce theirs. Once we have increased our numbers, our morale will increase as well. By then, we should be able to defeat the rebels easily. If we do nothing now and wait for reinforcements to arrive, by then it'll be much more difficult to separate the rebels into 'good' and 'bad' camps and turn those in the 'good' camp to our side. Although we have no authorisation from the imperial court, given the current circumstances, I don't think it's unreasonable for us to exercise our own judgment and act accordingly."

Everyone agreed with Su Ze. With support from Zhang Ji, the Inspector of Yong Province, and Zhang Gong (張恭), the Chief Clerk of Dunhuang, Su Ze started launching military operations to suppress the rebellions. He first led his troops to Wuwei Commandery to assist Guanqiu Xing in putting down the unrest caused by the local tribes. After pacifying Wuwei Commandery, he joined forces with Guanqiu Xing to attack Zhang Jin in Zhangye Commandery. When Qu Yan heard about it, he led 3,000 men to meet Su Ze and lied that he wanted to surrender while secretly plotting to incite a mutiny. Su Ze saw through Qu Yan's lies, lured him into a trap and executed him. The rebels fled when they saw that Qu Yan was dead. Su Ze then gathered his allies, attacked Zhangye Commandery together, and defeated and killed Zhang Jin. The other rebels surrendered. When Huang Hua learnt that Qu Yan and Zhang Jin had been defeated and killed, he became fearful and surrendered to Su Ze. The rebellions thus came to an end. Su Ze returned to Jincheng Commandery in triumph. As a reward for his contributions, Su Ze was elevated from the status of a Secondary Marquis to a Marquis of a Chief Village (都亭侯) and given a marquisate of 300 taxable households.

== Service in the Cao Wei state ==
In late 220, Cao Cao's son and successor, Cao Pi, usurped the throne from Emperor Xian, ended the Eastern Han dynasty, and established the Cao Wei state with himself as the new emperor. After becoming emperor, Cao Pi summoned Su Ze to the imperial capital, Luoyang, to serve as a Palace Attendant (侍中). He also assigned Su Ze to the same office as Dong Zhao. On one occasion, while taking a break, Dong Zhao laid down on the floor and rested his head on Su Ze's lap. Su Ze pushed him away and said, "My lap is not a pillow for sycophants."

At the time, as Palace Attendants' duties included seeing to the emperor's daily living conditions, they were often teasingly referred to as zhihuzi (執虎子; "chamber pot holder"). Su Ze's old friend, Ji Mao (吉茂), had become a county prefect at the time. When they met up, Ji Mao poked fun at Su Ze by saying, "Can your career bring you to anything more than a zhihuzi?" Su Ze laughed and said, "I can't be like you, riding freely on your chariot."

=== Mourning the fall of the Eastern Han dynasty ===
Su Ze was still the Administrator of Jincheng Commandery when he first heard that the Cao Wei state had replaced the Eastern Han dynasty, and he thought that Emperor Xian was dead so he held a memorial service for the emperor. Later, he became awkwardly silent when he found out that Emperor Xian was alive and had been made the Duke of Shanyang (山陽公) after his abdication. Cao Zhi, a younger brother of Cao Pi, also shed tears when he heard of the fall of the Han dynasty. Cao Zhi's grief, however, was also partly because of the frustration he felt at losing to Cao Pi when they were fighting for the succession to their father's place. After Cao Pi became emperor, he was surprised to learn that there were people who cried when they heard that Emperor Xian had abdicated the throne to him, so he asked his subjects why. At the point in time, Cao Pi already knew about Cao Zhi, but not about Su Ze, so his question was directed at Cao Zhi. Su Ze thought that Cao Pi was referring to him, so he prepared to step up and respond. However, Fu Xun, another Palace Attendant, stopped him and said, "(His Majesty) is not talking about you." Su Ze then backed down.

=== Giving advice to Cao Pi ===
On one occasion, Cao Pi asked Su Ze, "Previously, when you pacified Jiuquan and Zhangye and opened up trade with the Western Regions, I remember that Dunhuang offered large pearls as tribute. Can we find such pearls in the market now?" Su Ze replied, "If Your Majesty can rule the Empire well, bring everything into harmony, spread our culture to the deserts (in the Western Regions), then such pearls will automatically come to us. If you ask for them and get them, they won't be as valuable (as when they are willingly offered as tribute)." Cao Pi fell silent.

On another occasion, when Cao Pi was out on a hunting excursion, the fences built to trap the deer in an enclosed area were not properly secured so the deer broke through the fences and escaped. Cao Pi was so furious that he drew his sword and wanted to execute his servants. Su Ze knelt down and pleaded with him to spare the servants, saying, "Your Majesty, I heard that the sage-rulers of ancient times would not harm people for the sake of animals. Now, Your Majesty wishes to promote the culture of Yao's time, yet Your Majesty wants to execute so many people just because a hunting excursion went wrong. I don't think this is something Your Majesty should do. With my life, I beg Your Majesty to spare these people." Cao Pi replied, "You're a subject who speaks his mind." He then spared all his servants. Since then, Cao Pi became more wary of Su Ze because he knew that Su Ze would not hesitate to speak up and criticise him if he did something wrong.

=== Death ===
In 223, Cao Pi reassigned Su Ze to be the Chancellor (相) of Dongping State (東平國; south of present-day Dongping County, Shandong). While en route to Dongping State to assume his new appointment, Su Ze fell sick and died. Cao Pi honoured him with the posthumous title "Marquis Gang" (剛侯).

== Descendants ==
Su Ze's elder son, Su Yi (蘇怡), inherited his father's peerage and marquisate as a Marquis of a Chief Village (都亭侯). He had no son to succeed him when he died.

Su Ze's younger son, Su Yu (蘇愉; died 270?), succeeded his elder brother Su Yi. Su Yu, whose courtesy name was Xiuyu (休豫), served in the Cao Wei state and rose to the position of a Master of Writing (尚書) sometime between 264 and 265. After the Jin dynasty replaced the Cao Wei state in February 266, Su Yu continued serving in the Jin government as Minister of Ceremonies (太常) and Household Counsellor (光祿大夫). Shan Tao, one of the Seven Sages of the Bamboo Grove, once praised Su Yu for his loyalty and intelligence. In c.270, Su Yu, then the Inspector of Liang, led forces who were routed by Tufa Shujineng at Mount Jin (金山; located in Shandan county, Gansu); Su Ze himself may have been killed as well.

Su Yu had three sons: an unnamed son, Su Shao (蘇紹) and Su Shen (蘇慎). Su Yu's unnamed son had a daughter who married Shi Chong (石崇; 249–300). Su Shao, whose courtesy name was Shisi (世嗣), was a notable poet whose works were included in the Jin Gu Collection (金谷集). He was also a tutor to Sima Yan (司馬晏; 281–311), a son of Emperor Wu of the Jin dynasty, and father of Emperor Min of Jin. Su Shen served as Left General of the Guards (左衞將軍) under the Jin dynasty.

== See also ==
- Lists of people of the Three Kingdoms
