= Tufa Shujineng =

Xianbei chieftain (died 280)

Tufa Shujineng (Chinese: 禿髮樹機能; pinyin: Tūfà shùjīnéng; Wade–Giles: t'u-fa shu-chi-neng; died January or February 280) was a Xianbei chieftain who lived during the Three Kingdoms period of China. As the leader of the Tufa tribe of Hexi, he led a tribal rebellion in Liang and Qin provinces against the ruling Western Jin dynasty between 270 and 280. Shujineng’s rebellion became a serious issue for the newly established dynasty, and in 279, he and his allies captured Liang province. However, soon after reaching his greatest success, Shujineng was defeated and killed by the general, Ma Long, who used a series of unconventional tactics to end his rebellion the following year.

== Life ==
=== Background ===
Tufa Shujineng's grandfather was Tufa Shoutian (禿髮壽闐) and his great-grandfather was Pigu (匹孤). Pigu was the son of the Tuoba Xianbei chieftain Tuoba Jifen (拓跋詰汾) and his brother was Tuoba Liwei. Pigu led his branch of Xianbei to Hexi when Liwei succeeded his father as chieftain in 218. The Book of Wei states that his territory spanned from Maitian (麥田; in present-day Jingyuan County, Gansu) and Qiantun (牽屯; in present-day Guyuan, Ningxia) in the east to Shiluo (濕羅; located east of Qinghai Lake) in the west and from the Jiaohe (澆河; in present-day Guide County, Qinghai) in the south to the Gobi Desert in the north.

There are two theories as to how the Tufa got their name. The first being that the words 'Tufa' (禿髮) and 'Tuoba' (拓拔) were homonyms, and were used as a derogatory term against Pigu's branch since Tufa means 'bald hair'. The more traditional view is that it was Shoutian who named the clan 'Tufa' after his nickname. Shoutian's mother, Lady Huye (胡掖氏), gave birth to him on a blanket, and the Xianbei word for blanket is 'Tufa', leading to Shoutian's name. It is unknown when Shoutian died, but he was succeeded by his grandson, Tufa Shujineng. Shujineng was described by historians as both brave and resolute as well as cunning and crafty.

When the Cao Wei general, Deng Ai, was stationed in the north west between 256 and 263, he received the surrender of tens of thousands of Xianbei people from Hexi. He resettled them in the areas between Liang and Yong provinces, where they mingled with the local inhabitants.

=== Rebellion against Jin ===
Due to ongoing oppression by local Chinese officials, the Xianbei chieftain Shujineng rebelled against Jin rule in 270. Although Shujineng was a Xianbei, his rebellion also involved other nomadic people such as the Qiang and Di. Hu Lie, Inspector of the Qin province camped at Wanhudui (萬斛堆; located in Gaolan County, Gansu) to campaign against him. However, after Hu Lie's reinforcements failed to arrived, Shujineng and his allies surrounded his army and killed him. The Inspector of Liang, Su Yu (蘇愉), led forces who were also routed by Shujineng at Mount Jin (金山; located in Shandan county, Gansu province).

With the removal of Sima Liang, Emperor Wu sent Shi Jian (石鉴) and Tian Zheng (田章) to put down the uprising. Shi Jian ordered his subordinate, Du Yu, to attack Shujineng. However, Du Yu suggested to his superior that they wait until next spring to attack Shujineng, as the rebels were still in high spirits from their victories. Shi Jian dismissed Du Yu and carried out his original plans, but was unable to defeat Shujineng.

In 271, Shujineng was joined by the Beidi tribes (北地; in present-day Qingyang, Gansu) in his attack on Jincheng (金城; around present-day Yuzhong County, Gansu). The Inspector of Liang province, Qian Hong, led his troops to fight Shujineng's forces, but the Qiang troops within Qian's army, dissatisfied by his mistreatment of them, rebelled and join Shujineng. Shujineng defeated and killed Qian Hong at Mount Qing (青山; located in Huan county, Gansu province) after surrounding his army.

In 275, Sima Jun campaigned against Shujineng and defeated his forces killing 3,000 rebels. That same year, Shujineng, Houdanbo (侯彈勃) and their supporters planned to raid the military-agricultural colonies in Guanzhong. However, Sima Jun's subordinate, Wen Yang, led a combined force of troops from Liang, Qin and Yong provinces to threaten Shujineng. Shujineng sent Houdanbo and twenty tribesmen to submit to Jin, each sending their sons as hostages. At the same time, Wen Yang also received the surrender of 200,000 tribal people from Anding, Wuwei (武威郡; in present-day Jingyuan County, Gansu) and Jincheng (金城; around present-day Yuzhong County, Gansu).

Shujineng rebelled again in 277 but was defeated by Wen Yang early on. In 278, the Inspector of Liang, Yang Xin, fought with Shujineng's ally, Ruoluobaneng (若羅拔能) in the Dang Ranges (丹嶺) in Wuwei, but was defeated and beheaded. Shujineng continued to harass Jin's borders, and by the beginning of 279, Shujineng captured Liang province.

=== Battle of Liang province and death ===
Ma Long, a junior Jin general, volunteered to lead a Jin army of 3,500 elite soldiers and defeat Shujineng. After Ma Long crossed the Wen River (溫水; east of present-day Jingyuan County, Gansu), Shujineng had tens of thousands of his soldiers occupy the passes to defend block Ma Long's front and while the others set up ambushes to block Ma Long's rear. During their battles with Ma Long, Shujineng's soldiers encountered the enemies' 'flat box carts' (偏箱車; a cart with a board on one side which acts like a shield) and 'deer-antlered carts' (鹿角車; a cart with spears and halberds on the front, giving it an antler-like shape). The rebels were unable to harm the Jin troops with their arrows, while the Jin troops killed and injured many of them as they marched through the narrow passes. It is also said that Ma Long placed 'magnetic stones' on the ground to slow down the rebel troops as they and their horses generally wore iron armour as opposed to the Jin troops who wore rhinoceros hide armour. The rebels thought that Ma Long's soldiers were divine beings.

Regardless of its historicity, Ma Long's campaign saw the end of Shujineng's raids. Once Ma Long reached Wuwei, Shujineng's allied chieftains, Cubahan (猝跋韓) and Zuwanneng (且萬能), surrendered to Ma Long along with the ten thousand troops under them. In January or February 280, Ma Long, with the help of Meiguneng (沒骨能) and other tribal leaders, decisively defeated and killed Shujineng. Another account states that after Shujineng was defeated, he was assassinated by his subordinates, who then submitted to Ma Long.

With peace restored, Shujineng was replaced by his younger cousin, Tufa Wuwan (禿髮務丸), as their tribe's leader. Wuwan's great-great-grandson, Tufa Wugu (Prince Wu), would later found the Southern Liang dynasty during the Sixteen Kingdoms period.
