= Du Yu =

Chinese classicist, general and politician (222–285)

- 杜預
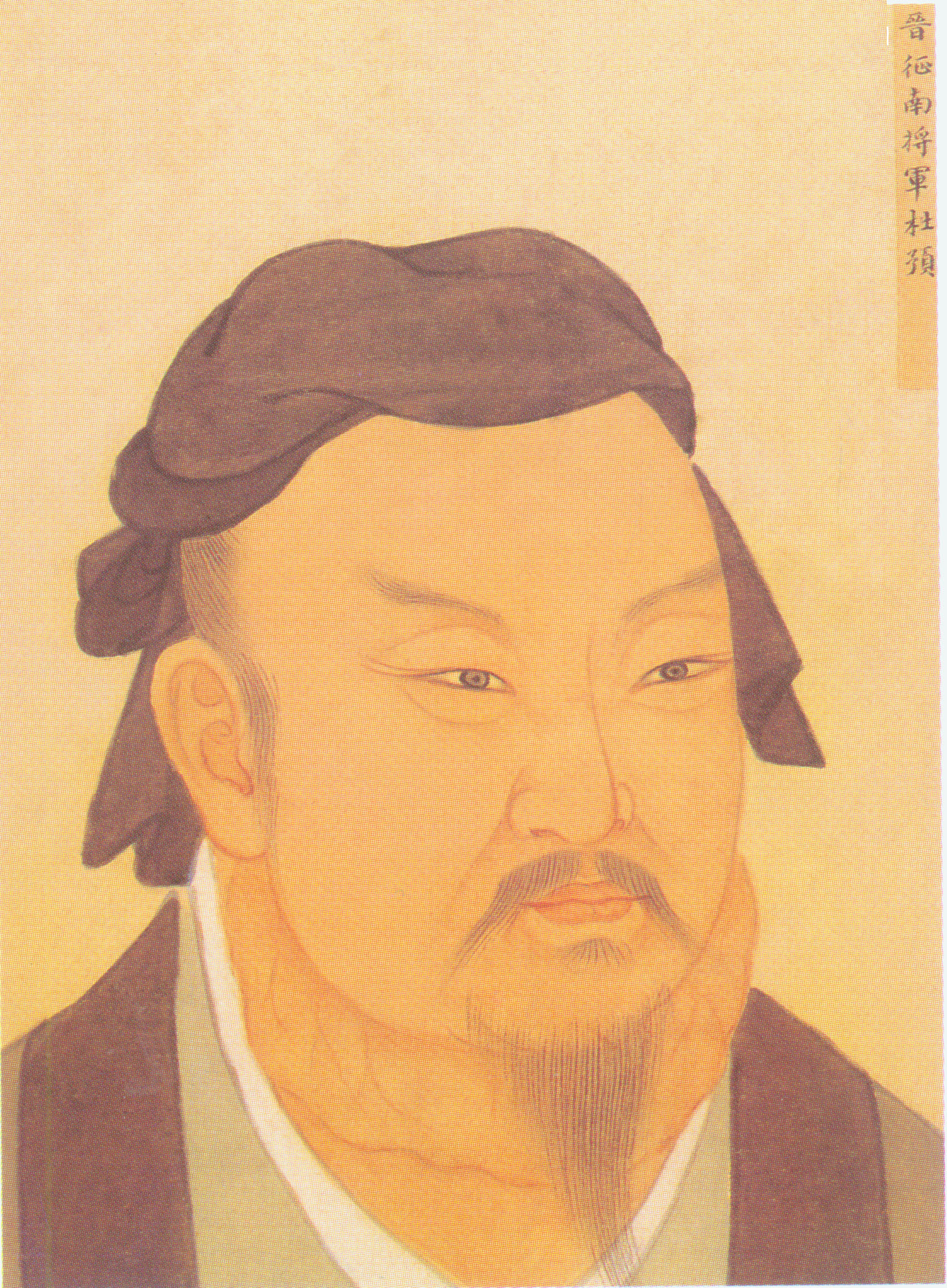
- A Qing dynasty portrait of Du Yu

Colonel-Director of Retainers (司隸校尉)
- In office 285
- Monarch: Emperor Wu of Jin

Senior General Who Guards the South (鎮南大將軍)
- In office 278 – 285
- Monarch: Emperor Wu of Jin
- Preceded by: Yang Hu

General of Light Chariots (輕車將軍)
- In office 270 – 278?
- Monarch: Emperor Wu of Jin

Colonel of the Eastern Qiang (東羌校尉)
- In office 270 – ?
- Monarch: Emperor Wu of Jin

Inspector of Qin Province (秦州刺史) (Note: Vol.79 of Zizhi Tongjian recorded that Du Yu was made Inspector of Qin Province after Hu Lie's death; shortly after this appointment, he was sent back to Luoyang in a prison cart. He was then no longer involved in further developments regarding Tufa Shujineng's rebellion.)
- In office 270 – ?
- Monarch: Emperor Wu of Jin

Military Judge under the General Who Stabilises the West (安西將軍軍司)
- In office 270
- Monarch: Emperor Wu of Jin

Intendant of Henan (河南尹)
- In office 265 or after – before 271 (Note: Vol.79 of Zizhi Tongjian recorded that Yu Chun (庾純; brother of Yu Liang's grandfather) was Intendant of Henan in 271-272.)
- Monarch: Emperor Wu of Jin

Chief Clerk under the General Who Guards the West (鎮西將軍長史)
- In office 263
- Monarch: Cao Huan

Army Adviser (參軍)
- In office 259 – 263
- Monarch: Cao Mao / Cao Huan

Gentleman of Writing (尚書郎)
- In office ? – 259
- Monarch: Cao Mao

Personal details
- Born: 222 Xi'an, Shaanxi
- Died: 285 (aged 63) Dengzhou, Henan
- Spouse: Princess Gaolu
- Relations: Du Ji (grandfather); Du Bin (cousin); Du Zhi (cousin); Du Yi (grandson); Du Lingyang (great-granddaughter)
- Children: Du Xi; Du Ji; Du Dan; Du Yin
- Parent: Du Shu (father)
- Occupation: Classicist, military general, politician
- Courtesy name: Yuankai (元凱)
- Posthumous name: Marquis Cheng (成侯)
- Peerage: Marquis of Dangyang (當陽侯)

Du Yu (222 (Note: According to Du Yu's biography in Book of Jin, he was 63 (by East Asian reckoning) when he died. Thus by calculation, his birth year should be 222.) – January or February 285 (Note: According to Sima Yan's biography in Book of Jin, Du Yu died in the leap (12th) month of the 5th year of the Taikang era of his reign. This corresponds to 23 Jan to 21 Feb 285 in the Julian calendar.)), courtesy name Yuankai, was a Chinese classicist, military general, and politician of the state of Cao Wei during the late Three Kingdoms period and early Jin dynasty.

== Life ==
Du Yu was from Duling County (杜陵縣), Jingzhao Commandery (京兆郡), which is located northwest of present-day Xi'an, Shaanxi. He married Princess Gaolu, a sister of Sima Zhao, the regent of the Cao Wei state from 255 to 265 and the father of Sima Yan (Emperor Wu), later the first emperor of the Jin dynasty (266–420).

A prolific author, Du Yu was a self-proclaimed addict of the Zuo Zhuan (Note: Du Yu's biography in Book of Jin recorded that at the time, Wang Ji (son of Wang Hun) was a good judge and lover of horses, while He Qiao (grandson of He Qia) was a hoarder of wealth. Du Yu then commented that Wang Ji was a horse addict while He Qiao was a money addict. Sima Yan (Emperor Wu), upon hearing this, asked Du Yu if he had any addiction. Du Yu then replied that he was an addict of the Zuo Zhuan.) and wrote an influential commentary to it. He was one of the most important commanders under the Wei general Zhong Hui during the conquest of Wei's rival state, Shu. After the Shu campaign, he was also involved in putting down Tufa Shujineng's rebellion. (Note: With the removal of Sima Liang, Emperor Wu sent the General Who Maintains the West, Shi Jian (石鑒) and Protector-General of Vehement Might, Tian Zheng (田章) to put down the revolt. Shi Jian ordered Du Yu, who was then his subordinate, to attack Shujineng. However, Du Yu protested, stating that the enemies were still in high spirits after their recent victories, as opposed to the demoralized Jin troops. He instead suggested that they wait until the following spring to attack, building up strength and storing up grains in the meantime. Shi Jian thought that Du Yu was trying to jeopardize the campaign, so he had Du Yu sent back to Luoyang in a prison cart for him to face the Minister of Justice. Shi Jian then carried out his original plans, but he could not defeat Shujineng.) Just before Yang Hu's death in December 278, he recommended that Du Yu replace him as commander for the conquest of the state of Eastern Wu. About a year after Yang's death, the Jin dynasty's invasion of Wu began. Leading an army, Du Yu managed to lay waste to the Wu army with great force within a few months, and received the surrender of Sun Hao, the last Wu emperor, in May 280. His military achievements were all the more remarkable due to his physical weaknesses; it was recorded that he was unable to ride a horse or shoot an arrow with significant force.

Du Yu was also an ancestor of the Tang dynasty poet Du Fu, and his grandfather Du Shenyan. Unlike his predecessors, Du Yu used the Zuo Zhuan to comment on the Chunqiu Classic. He therefore combined the two books in one, which has been the common practice since.

== See also ==
- Lists of people of the Three Kingdoms
