= Qian Hong (Jin dynasty) =

Cao Wei general and official (died 271)

- 牽弘

Inspector of Liang Province (涼州刺史)
- In office ? – c. May 271
- Monarch: Emperor Wu of Jin

Inspector of Yang Province (揚州刺史)
- In office February 266 or after – ?
- Monarch: Emperor Wu of Jin

Army Protector Who Inspires Might (振威護軍)
- In office 264 – 265
- Monarch: Cao Huan

Administrator of Shu Commandery (蜀郡太守)
- In office c. December 263 – 264
- Monarch: Cao Huan

Personal details
- Born: Unknown Fucheng County, Hebei
- Died: c.May 271 Yuzhong County, Gansu
- Parent: Qian Zhao (father)
- Occupation: Official

Qian Hong (died c.May 271) was an official of the Jin dynasty of China. He previously served in the state of Cao Wei during the Three Kingdoms period. His father, Qian Zhao (牽招), was a notable military general of the Cao Wei state.

== Life ==
Qian Hong was the second son of Qian Zhao (牽招), a military general of the Cao Wei state in the Three Kingdoms period. He initially served as the Administrator (太守) of Longxi Commandery (隴西郡; around present-day Longxi County, Gansu). In late 263, he participated in the campaign against Wei's rival state, Shu Han, as a subordinate of the Wei general Deng Ai. After the fall of Shu, the Wei government appointed Qian Hong as the Administrator of Shu Commandery (蜀郡; around present-day Chengdu, Sichuan). Between 264 and 265, he was promoted to Army Protector Who Inspires Might (振威護軍).

In 266, following the replacement of the Cao Wei state by the Jin dynasty (266–420) in February that year, Qian Hong was appointed as the Inspector (刺史) of Yang Province. In c.February 270, he repelled an invasion led by Ding Feng, a general from the Jin dynasty's rival state Eastern Wu. Around the time, Qian Hong had disagreements with his superior, Chen Qian (陳騫), who was the overall supervisor of military affairs in Yang Province. Both Qian Hong and Chen Qian wrote reports to Emperor Wu to accuse each other of incompetence. Emperor Wu eventually reassigned Qian Hong to be the Inspector of Liang Province. (Note: Qian Hong was probably the replacement for Su Yu (son of Su Ze), who led forces which were routed by Tufa Shujineng at Mount Jin (金山; located in Shandan county, Gansu); Su himself may have been killed as well.)

Earlier, in 270, the Xianbei chieftain Tufa Shujineng started a rebellion in Beidi Commandery (北地郡; around present-day Tongchuan, Shaanxi) and led his tribal forces to attack Jincheng Commandery (金城郡; around present-day Yuzhong County, Gansu). In 271, Qian Hong, then the Inspector of Liang Province, led government forces to attack the rebels. However, due to his incompetence, he caused the Qiang tribes to rebel as well. He was eventually cornered by the rebels and killed in battle.

== See also ==
- Lists of people of the Three Kingdoms
