= Mian County =

Coordinates: 33°9′N 106°40′E

Mian County 勉县
- County
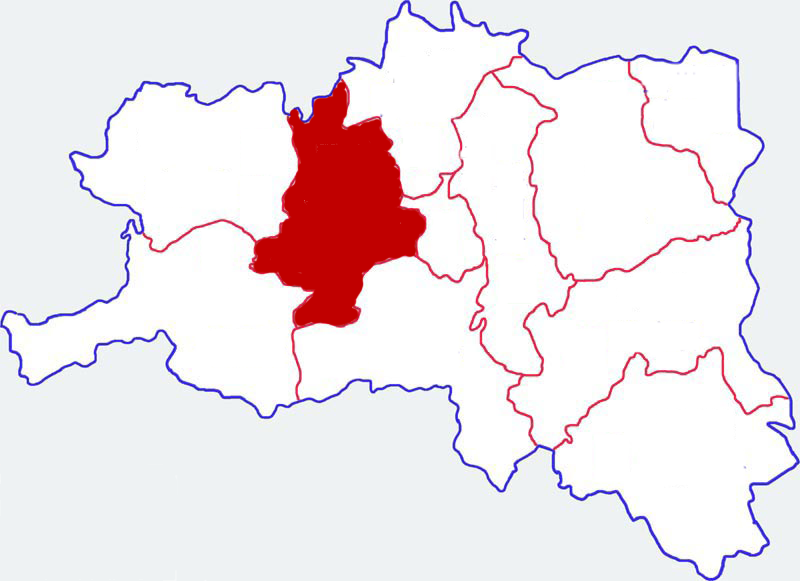
- Location in Hanzhong

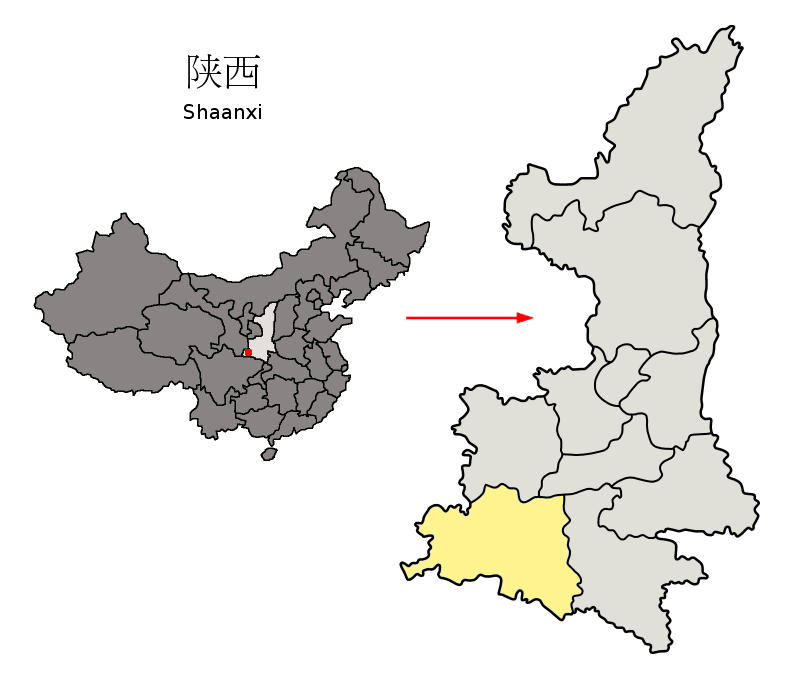
- Hanzhong in Shaanxi
- Country: People's Republic of China
- Province: Shaanxi
- Prefecture-level city: Hanzhong

Area
  - Total: 2,406 km^{2} (929 sq mi)
- Highest elevation: 2,621 m (8,599 ft)
- Lowest elevation: 513 m (1,683 ft)

Population (2019)
  - Total: 411,991
  - Density: 171.2/km^{2} (443.5/sq mi)
- Time zone: UTC+8 (China standard time)
- Postal code: 724200
- Licence plates: 陕F
- Website: www.mianxian.gov.cn

Mian County or Mianxian (simplified Chinese: 勉县; traditional Chinese: 勉縣; pinyin: Miǎn Xiàn) is a county of Hanzhong, in the southwest of Shaanxi province, China, bordering Gansu province to the northwest. Its area measures 2,406 km^{2} (929 sq mi), and its total population as of 2020 was 429,000 people. During the Qin and Han dynasty it was known as Mianshui (沔水). In 1964 it was renamed to Mianxian with a homophone character for Mian, to avoid the use of uncommon characters in place names. In 2020, the county government requested the name of the county to be changed to Mianzhou (沔州市), pending central government approval. Previously the government requested to use the name Dingjunshan City, but this was denied by the central government.

The tomb of Zhuge Liang near Mount Dingjun is located in the county.

== Transportation ==
Mian County is served by the Yangpingguan–Ankang Railway.

== Administrative divisions ==
Mian County has 19 subordinate towns:

#	Name	Simplified Chinese	Hanyu Pinyin
1	Mianyang	勉阳镇	Miǎnyáng Zhèn
2	Zhoujiashan	周家山镇	Zhōujiāshān Zhèn
3	Tonggousi	同沟寺镇	Tónggōusì Zhèn
4	Xinjiezi	新街子镇	Xīnjiēzi Zhèn
5	Laodaosi	老道寺镇	Lǎodàosì Zhèn
6	Dingjunshan	定军山镇	Dìngjūnshān Zhèn
7	Wenquan	温泉镇	Wēnquán Zhèn
8	Yuandun	元墩镇	Yuándūn Zhèn
9	Xinpu	新铺镇	Xīnpù Zhèn
10	Chadian	茶店镇	Chádiàn Zhèn
11	Wuhou	武侯镇	Wǔhóu Zhèn
12	Baocheng (Paocheng)	褒城镇	Bāochéng Zhèn
13	Jinquan	金泉镇	Jīnquán Zhèn
14	Fuchuan	阜川镇	Fùchuān Zhèn
15	Qingyangyi	青羊驿镇	Qīngyángyì Zhèn
16	Qishuba	漆树坝镇	Qīshùbà Zhèn
17	Zhanggouhe	长沟河镇	Zhǎnggōuhé Zhèn
18	Zhenchuan	镇川镇	Zhènchuān Zhèn
19	Zhangjiahe	张家河镇	Zhāngjiāhé Zhèn

== Climate ==
Climate data for Mianxian, elevation 548 m (1,798 ft), (1991–2020 normals, extremes 1981–present)
Month	Jan	Feb	Mar	Apr	May	Jun	Jul	Aug	Sep	Oct	Nov	Dec	Year
Record high °C (°F)	19.5 (67.1)	21.8 (71.2)	30.3 (86.5)	32.4 (90.3)	35.1 (95.2)	38.0 (100.4)	41.5 (106.7)	41.3 (106.3)	37.0 (98.6)	29.7 (85.5)	22.3 (72.1)	18.7 (65.7)	41.5 (106.7)
Mean daily maximum °C (°F)	7.5 (45.5)	10.6 (51.1)	15.9 (60.6)	22.0 (71.6)	26.0 (78.8)	28.9 (84.0)	30.4 (86.7)	29.9 (85.8)	24.6 (76.3)	19.2 (66.6)	13.4 (56.1)	8.5 (47.3)	19.7 (67.5)
Daily mean °C (°F)	3.1 (37.6)	5.9 (42.6)	10.5 (50.9)	16.0 (60.8)	20.1 (68.2)	23.7 (74.7)	25.6 (78.1)	25.0 (77.0)	20.3 (68.5)	15.0 (59.0)	9.2 (48.6)	4.2 (39.6)	14.9 (58.8)
Mean daily minimum °C (°F)	−0.2 (31.6)	2.4 (36.3)	6.4 (43.5)	11.3 (52.3)	15.4 (59.7)	19.4 (66.9)	21.8 (71.2)	21.2 (70.2)	17.2 (63.0)	12.1 (53.8)	6.2 (43.2)	1.0 (33.8)	11.2 (52.1)
Record low °C (°F)	−6.9 (19.6)	−5.0 (23.0)	−4.2 (24.4)	0.6 (33.1)	5.5 (41.9)	11.2 (52.2)	15.5 (59.9)	14.2 (57.6)	9.4 (48.9)	−1.8 (28.8)	−3.1 (26.4)	−10.2 (13.6)	−10.2 (13.6)
Average precipitation mm (inches)	5.1 (0.20)	10.1 (0.40)	24.9 (0.98)	49.6 (1.95)	79.2 (3.12)	92.8 (3.65)	154.4 (6.08)	109.3 (4.30)	127.5 (5.02)	64.7 (2.55)	26.6 (1.05)	5.8 (0.23)	750 (29.53)
Average precipitation days (≥ 0.1 mm)	4.5	5.8	7.9	9.4	12.1	12.1	13.4	12.8	14.0	13.1	8.4	4.8	118.3
Average snowy days	3.8	2.0	0.5	0	0	0	0	0	0	0	0.6	1.6	8.5
Average relative humidity (%)	73	71	70	71	70	73	79	79	82	83	82	77	76
Mean monthly sunshine hours	78.9	75.8	115.0	148.8	164.0	161.5	179.6	177.5	101.3	87.5	80.0	84.1	1,454
Percentage possible sunshine	25	24	31	38	38	38	41	43	28	25	26	27	32
Source: China Meteorological Administration all-time extreme temperature
