= Yongzhou (ancient China) =

One of the Nine Provinces of ancient Chinese legend

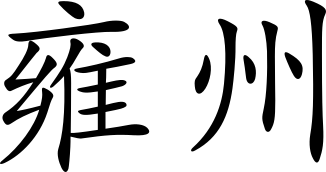
- "Yongzhou" in Chinese characters
- Chinese: 雍州
- Postal: Yung Chow
- Literal meaning: Harmonious Province
Transcriptions
Standard Mandarin
- Hanyu Pinyin: Yōngzhōu
- Wade–Giles: Yung Chou

Yong Province or Yongzhou was the name of various regions and provinces in ancient China, usually around the Wei River or the imperial capital.

== Geographical region ==
In the Book of Documents, Yongzhou is mentioned as one of the legendary Nine Provinces of China's prehistoric antiquity.

From the Western Zhou dynasty to the Western Jin dynasty, the name Yongzhou was applied to the area around the imperial capital, whether it was the Wei Valley (also known as Guanzhong) or the territory around Luoyang. When Emperor Wu of the Western Han dynasty created the 13 inspectorates (刺史部; cishi bu), the western part of Yongzhou became part of Liangzhou Inspectorate (凉州刺史部) and its eastern part was governed by the Colonel-Director of Retainers (司隶校尉).

== Han province ==
When Emperor Wu of Han relocated the Han capital to Luoyang, he briefly established a formal Yong Province. However, he abolished it soon after.

== Han inspectorate ==
In AD 194, the Eastern Han government established a Yongzhou Inspectorate overseeing the commanderies of Wuwei, Zhangye, Jiuquan, Dunhuang, and Xihai (西海) west of the Liang River. The inspectorate seat was at Guzhang (姑臧). In the year 213, the Liangzhou Inspectorate was abolished and the commanderies of the Three Guardians (三輔, sanfu) were absorbed as part of Yongzhou Inspectorate.

== Wei inspectorate ==
In 220, amid the Three Kingdoms Era, the Wei government reconstituted the Liangzhou Inspectorate from the eight commanderies of Yong Province west of the Liang River. Yong Province was established as an inspectorate to the east of Liangzhou and the Yellow River, near the commanderies of the Three Guardians near the capital of Chang'an, with the inspectorate seat at Chang'an.

The situation remained the same throughout the Three Kingdoms period and Western Jin dynasty.

== Former Qin province ==
The Former Qin dynasty suddenly shifted Yongzhou to Anding Commandery (安定郡) in present-day Zhenyuan and Puban Commandery (蒲坂郡) in present-day Yongji.

== Southern & Northern geographical regions ==
During the time of rival dynasties in the Southern and Northern Dynasties period, the Northern Wei, Western Wei and Northern Zhou dynasties in the north referred to Yongzhou as the periphery of Chang'an with its government seat at Chang'an, while the Eastern Jin dynasty and the Southern Dynasties in the south referred to Yongzhou as the periphery of Xiangyang.

== Sui province ==
After the reunification of China by the Sui dynasty, Yong Province's administrative centre was permanently set at Chang'an, capital of the empire. During the Sui administrative reforms in 607 to transform the provincial system into a commandery system, Emperor Yang renamed Yong Province to Jingzhao Commandery (京兆郡).

== Tang province ==
When the Tang dynasty was established, it was reverted for some time back to Yong Province, until Emperor Xuanzong converted it again to Jingzhao Prefecture (京兆府).
