= Jian (given name) =

Jian is a given name of Chinese origin. Notable people with the name include:

== Real people ==
- Cao Jian (died 225 or 226), prince in the state of Cao Wei in the Three Kingdoms period of China
- Chen Jian (diplomat) (born 1942), Chinese diplomat
- Chen Jian (politician, born 1952), Chinese politician who served as vice minister of Commerce from 2008 to 2013
- Chen Jian (born 1961), Chinese politician who served as party secretary of Dali Bai Autonomous Prefecture from 2017 to 2021.
- Chen Jian (academic), professor of Chinese history and international relations at Cornell University
- Xi Jian (269–339), Chinese military general of the Jin dynasty (266–420)
- Dong Jian (1936–2019), Chinese literary scholar
- Du'ao (born Xiong Jian, died 672 BC), king of the state of Chu during the Spring and Autumn period of ancient China
- Fan Jian (politician) (250s–263) was a Chinese politician of the state of Shu Han in the late Three Kingdoms period
- Fan Jian (legal scholar) (born 1957), Chinese legal scholar
- Fan Jian (officer) (born 1960), Chinese government accountant
- Gao Jian (footballer, born 1982), Chinese football player
- Guanqiu Jian (died 255), Chinese military general
- Guo Jian (born 1962), Chinese Australian artist
- Han Jian (Zhou Dynasty), third head of the House of Han
- Han Jian (Weibo warlord) (died 883), Tang dynasty warlord who governed Weibo Circuit
- Han Jian (Zhenguo warlord) (855–912), Tang dynasty warlord who governed Zhenguo Circuit, also served Later Liang after the end of Tang
- Han Jian (badminton) (born 1956), Chinese badminton player
- He Jian (1887–1956) was a Chinese Nationalist (KMT) general and politician in the Republic of China.
- He Jian (born 1965), former Chinese politician
- Hun Jian (736–800), general of the Chinese Tang Dynasty of Tiele extraction
- Ji Jian (937–892 BC), King Yih of Zhou, the seventh king of the Chinese Zhou Dynasty.
- Jian Ghomeshi (born 1967), Canadian broadcaster, writer, musician, producer
- Jin Jian (born 1994), Chinese bobsledder
- Li Jian (footballer, born 1977), Chinese football goalkeeper
- Li Jian (footballer, born March 1985), Chinese football defender
- Li Jian (footballer, born September 1985), Chinese football goalkeeper who represents Hong Kong internationally
- Li Jian (footballer, born 1986), Chinese football forward
- Li Jian (footballer, born 1989), Chinese football midfielder
- Li Jian (singer) (born 1974), Chinese singer-songwriter
- Jian Li (engineer)
- Liu Jian (diplomat) (born 1956), Chinese ambassador to Afghanistan, Malaysia, and Pakistan
- Liu Jian (Volkswagen) (died 2010), head of Shanghai Volkswagen
- Liu Jian (director) (born 1969), Chinese animation filmmaker
- Liu Jian (footballer) (born 1984), Chinese association footballer
- Liu Jian (rower) (born 1974), Chinese Olympic rower
- Jian Liu (academic) (born 1962), American pharmacologist
- Lu Jian (born 1972), Chinese host and anchorman
- Lyu Jian (born 1960), currently President of Nanjing University
- Muhammad Ma Jian (马坚, 1906–1978), Chinese Confucian scholar and Islamic jurist
- Ma Jian (writer) (马建, born 1953), Chinese writer
- Ma Jian (politician) (马建, born 1956), former Vice Minister of State Security of China
- Ma Jian (basketball) (马健, born 1969), Chinese basketball player and occasional actor
- Jian Ma (computer scientist) (马坚), American computer scientist at Carnegie Mellon University working on computational biology
- Shen Jian (born 1975), Chinese gymnast
- Shi Jian (sailor), a Chinese sailor and yacht racer
- Shi Jian, the Mandarin name of Shih Kien
- Shi Jianqiao, the murderer of warlord Sun Chuanfang
- Song Jian (born 1931), Chinese aerospace engineer, demographer, and politician
- Su Jian (died 903), official of the Chinese Tang Dynasty
- Sun Jian (155–191) was a warlord in the late Han dynasty.
- Sun Jian (politician) (1936–1997), Vice Premier of the People's Republic of China from 1975 to 1978
- Jian Sun (researcher), Chinese-born electronics researcher at Rensselaer Polytechnic Institute, New York
- Sun Jian (sport shooter) (born 1991), Chinese sport shooter
- Tan Jian (discus thrower) (born 1988), Chinese female discus thrower
- Tan Jian (diplomat) (born 1965), Chinese diplomat currently serving as Chinese ambassador
- Tang Jian (579–656), Chinese official who lived in the early Tang dynasty
- Jian Tang, professor of computer science at Syracuse University, IEEE fellow
- Tian Jian (264–221 BC), last king of Qi, one of the seven major states of the Warring States period of ancient China
- Tong Jian (born 1979), Chinese retired pair skater
- Wang Jian (Qin) (fl. 220s BC), Qin general
- Wang Jian (Southern Qi) (452–489), Liu Song and Southern Qi official
- Wang Jian (poet) (767–830), Tang dynasty poet
- Wang Jian (Former Shu) (847–918), founding emperor of Former Shu
- Wang Jian (17th-century painter) (1598–1677), painter during the Ming and Qing dynasties
- Wang Jian (geneticist) (born 1954), Chinese geneticist and biotechnology entrepreneur
- Jian Wang (contemporary painter) (born 1958), U.S.-based Chinese painter
- Wang Jian (businessman) (1961–2018), co-founder of Hainan Airlines and HNA Group
- Wang Jian (computer scientist) (born 1962), Chinese computer scientist
- Jian Wang (cellist) (born 1968), U.K.-based Chinese cellist
- Wang Jian (powerlifter), Chinese powerlifter
- Wang Jian (table tennis), Chinese table tennis player
- Wang Jian (biologist), Chinese biologist
- Wei Jian (born 1991), Chinese footballer
- Wu Jian (born 1986), Chinese track and field athlete
- Xu Jian (Tang dynasty) (徐堅; 659–729), Tang dynasty writer and official
- Xu Jian (diplomat) (徐坚; born 1956), former Chinese ambassador to Poland, Romania, and Slovenia
- Xu Jian (engineer) (徐建; born 1958), Chinese civil engineer
- Xu Jian (softball), Chinese softball player
- Emperor Wen of Sui (541–604), personal name Yang Jian, founder and emperor of the Sui dynasty
- Yang Jian (Sui prince) (585–618), Sui dynasty prince and Emperor Wen's grandson
- Yang Jian (Song dynasty) (died 1121), Song dynasty eunuch politician
- Yang Jian (rower) (born 1981), Chinese rower
- Yang Jian (footballer) (born 1988), Chinese footballer
- Yang Jian (diver) (born 1994), Chinese diver
- Erlang Shen, personal name Yang Jian, a mythological Chinese God
- Jian Yang (politician) (born c. 1961), China-born New Zealand politician
- Jian Yang (geneticist), statistical geneticist, Ruth Stephens Gani Medalist
- Yin Jian (born 1978) is a double Olympic medal winning Chinese sailor.
- Yin Jian (Communist leader), early member of the Chinese Communist Party and a member of the 28 Bolsheviks (1904–1937)
- Yu Jian (born 1954), Chinese poet, writer and documentary film director
- Zhan Jian (born 1982), Chinese-born Singaporean table tennis player
- Zhang Jian (fencer) (born 1962), Chinese fencer
- Zhang Jian (football) (born 1965/66), Chinese football administrator
- Zhang Jian (businessman) (1853–1926), courtesy name Jizhi, Chinese entrepreneur, politician and educationist
- Zhang Jian (runner) (born 1976), Chinese middle distance runner
- Zhang Jian (sport shooter) (born 1985), Chinese sport shooter
- Zhang Jian (Tang dynasty) (died 651), Tang Dynasty noble
- Zhang Jian (footballer) (born 1989), Chinese footballer
- Zhang Jian (activist) (1970–2019), Chinese activist
- Jian Zhou (1957–1999) was a Chinese virologist and cancer researcher.
- Zhou Jian (diplomat), Chinese diplomat currently serving as ambassador of China to Qatar (born 1968)
- Zhu Youqian (died 926), warlord
- Zhu Jian (actor) (born 1991), Chinese actor and model

== Fictional character ==
- Hou Jian, fictional character in Water Margin, one of the Four Great Classical Novels of Chinese literature

== See also ==
- Jian (surname), a common Chinese language surname
