= Encyclopedia =

Type of reference work

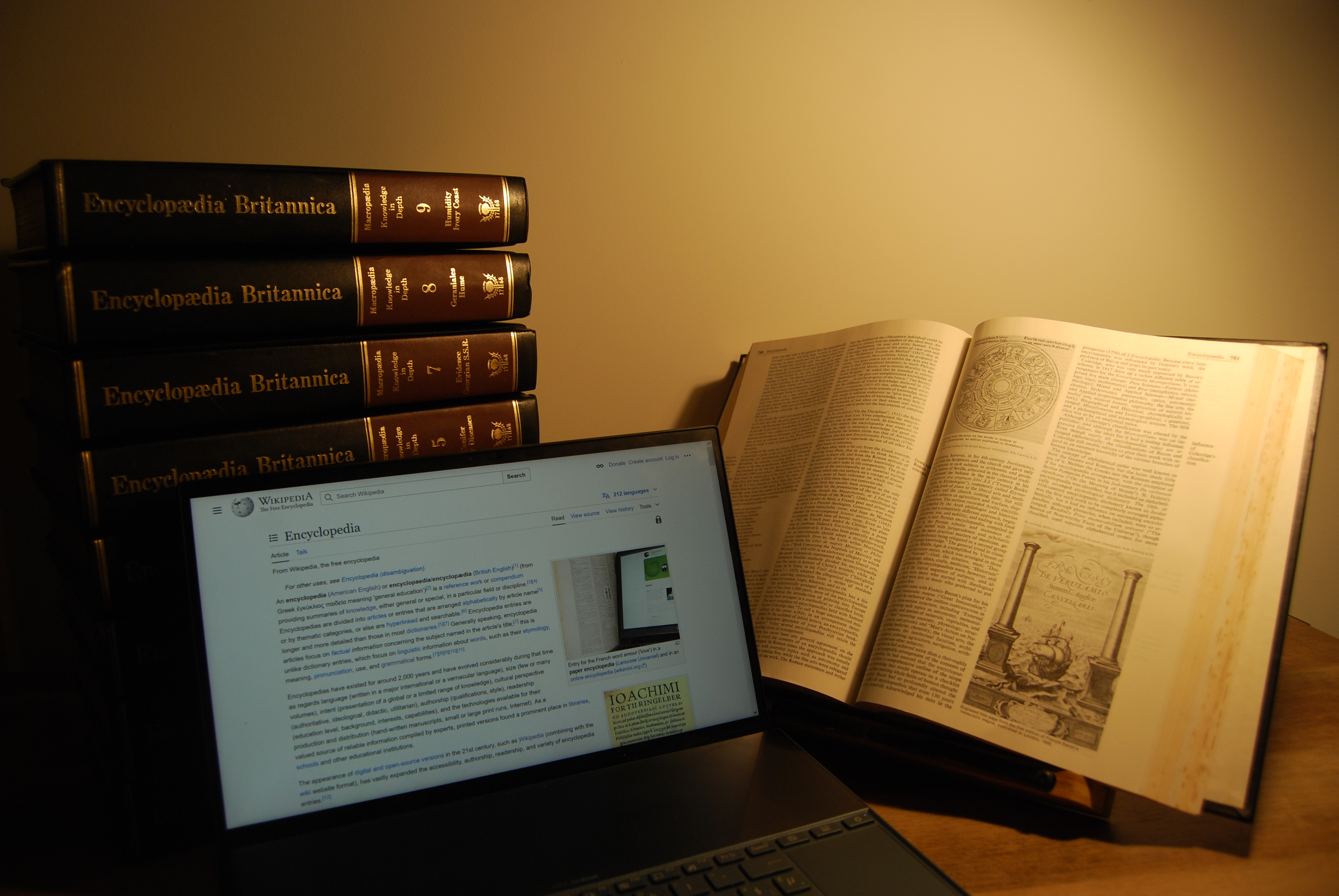
A laptop shows a Wikipedia page on "Encyclopedia", beside stacked volumes and an open page of the Encyclopædia Britannica.

An encyclopedia (Note: Also spelled encyclopaedia in British English; from Ancient Greek: ἐγκύκλιος παιδεία, romanized: enkyklios paideia) is a reference work or compendium providing summaries of knowledge, either general or special, in a particular field or discipline. Encyclopedias are divided into articles or entries that are arranged alphabetically by article name or by thematic categories, or, in the case of online encyclopedias, they are hyperlinked and searchable. Encyclopedia entries are longer and more detailed than those in most dictionaries. Generally speaking, encyclopedia articles focus on factual information concerning the subject named in the article's title; this is unlike dictionary entries, which focus on linguistic information about words, such as their etymology, meaning, pronunciation, use, and grammatical forms.

Encyclopedias have existed for around 2,000 years and have evolved considerably during that time as regards language (written in a major international or a vernacular language), size (few or many volumes), intent (presentation of a global or a limited range of knowledge), cultural perspective (authoritative, ideological, didactic, utilitarian), authorship (qualifications, style), readership (education level, background, interests, capabilities), and the technologies available for their production and distribution (hand-written manuscripts, small or large print runs, Internet). As a valued source of reliable information compiled by experts, printed versions found a prominent place in libraries, schools, and other educational institutions.

In the 21st century the appearance of digital and open-source versions such as Wikipedia (together with the wiki website format) has vastly expanded the accessibility, authorship, readership, and variety of encyclopedia entries.

== Etymology ==
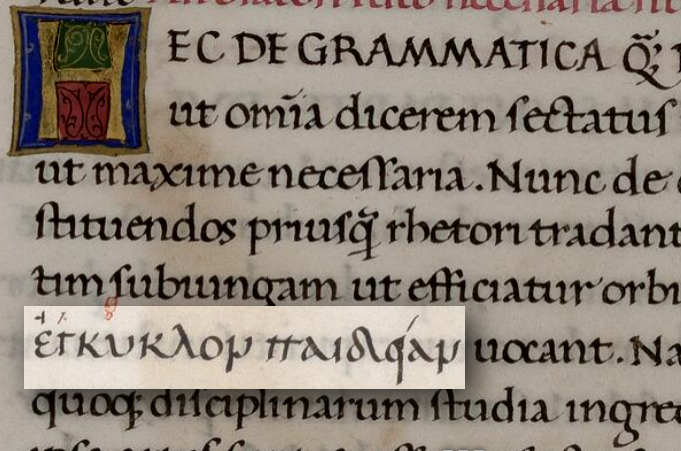
A 15th-century manuscript of Institutio Oratoria. The Greek root of the word encyclopedia is highlighted.

The word encyclopedia comes from the Koine Greek ἐγκύκλιος παιδεία, transliterated enkúklios paideía 'general education', from enkúklios (ἐγκύκλιος) 'circular, recurrent, required regularly, general' and paideía (παιδεία) 'education, rearing of a child'; together, the phrase literally translates as 'complete instruction, complete knowledge'. However, the two separate words were reduced to a single word due to a scribal error by copyists of a Latin manuscript edition of Quintilian in 1470. The copyists took this phrase to be a single Greek word, enkuklopaideía, with the same meaning, and this spurious Greek word became the Neo-Latin word encyclopaedia, which was in turn borrowed into English. Because of this compounded word, readers since the fifteenth century have often, and incorrectly, thought that the Roman authors Quintilian and Pliny described an ancient genre. Following Noah Webster's spelling reform, the spelling of the word varies between encyclopedia in American English, encyclopaedia in British English (although the spelling encyclopedia is increasingly gaining acceptance), and encyclopædia in certain specialized cases.

== Characteristics ==
The modern encyclopedia evolved from the dictionary in the 18th century; this lineage can be seen in the alphabetical order of print encyclopedias. Both encyclopedias and dictionaries have been compiled by well-educated authors, but they are significantly different in structure. A dictionary is a linguistic work that primarily focuses on an alphabetical listing of words and their definitions. Synonymous words and those related by the subject matter are to be found scattered around the dictionary, giving no obvious place for in-depth treatment. Thus, a dictionary typically provides limited information, analysis or background for the word defined. While it may offer a definition, it may leave the reader lacking in understanding the meaning, significance or limitations of a term, and how the term relates to a broader field of knowledge.

To address those needs, an encyclopedia article is typically not limited to simple definitions, and is not limited to defining an individual word, but provides a more extensive meaning for a subject or discipline. The Merriam-Webster definition of encyclopedia states that it is "a work that contains information on all branches of knowledge or treats comprehensively a particular branch of knowledge usually in articles arranged alphabetically often by subject". In addition to defining and listing synonymous terms for the topic, the article can treat the topic's more extensive meaning in more depth and convey the most relevant accumulated knowledge on that subject. An encyclopedia article also often includes many maps and illustrations, as well as bibliographies and statistics.

In addition, sometimes books or reading lists are compiled from a compendium of articles (either wholly or partially taken) from a specific encyclopedia.

=== Four major elements ===
Four major elements define an encyclopedia: its subject matter, its scope, its method of organization, and its method of production:

1. Encyclopedias can be general, containing articles on topics in every field (the English-language Encyclopædia Britannica and German Brockhaus are well-known examples). General encyclopedias may contain guides on how to do a variety of things, as well as embedded dictionaries and gazetteers. There are also encyclopedias that cover a wide variety of topics from a particular cultural, ethnic, or national perspective, such as the Great Soviet Encyclopedia or Encyclopaedia Judaica.
2. Works of encyclopedic scope aim to convey the important accumulated knowledge for their subject domain, such as an encyclopedia of medicine, philosophy or law. Works vary in the breadth of material and the depth of discussion, depending on the target audience.
3. Some systematic methods of organization are essential to making an encyclopedia usable for reference. There have been two main methods of organizing printed encyclopedias: the alphabetical method (consisting of several separate articles, organized in alphabetical order) and organization by hierarchical categories. The former method is today the more common, especially for general works. The fluidity of electronic media, however, allows new possibilities for multiple methods of organization of the same content. Further, electronic media offer new capabilities for search, indexing and cross reference. The epigraph from Horace on the title page of the 18th century Encyclopédie suggests the importance of the structure of an encyclopedia: "What grace may be added to commonplace matters by the power of order and connection."
4. As modern multimedia and the information age have evolved, new methods have emerged for the collection, verification, summation, and presentation of information of all kinds. Projects such as Interpedia, Everything2, Microsoft Encarta, h2g2, and Wikipedia are examples of new forms of the encyclopedia as information retrieval becomes simpler. The method of production for an encyclopedia has been supported in both for-profit and non-profit contexts; the aforementioned Great Soviet Encyclopedia was entirely state-sponsored, while the Britannica was a for-profit institution.

=== Differences between encyclopedias and dictionaries ===
There are some broad differences between encyclopedias and dictionaries. Most noticeably, encyclopedia articles are longer, fuller, and more thorough than entries in most general-purpose dictionaries. There are differences in content as well. Generally speaking, dictionaries provide linguistic information about most individual words, while encyclopedias focus more on the concepts for which a more limited range of words stand. Dictionary entries are inextricably fixed to the word described, while in an encyclopedia, the same concept may be found under a different entry title. Dictionary entries are not fully translatable into other languages, but encyclopedia articles can be.

In practice, however, the distinction is not concrete, as there is no clear-cut difference between factual, "encyclopedic" information and linguistic information typically found in dictionaries. Thus, encyclopedias may contain material that is also found in dictionaries, and vice versa. In particular, dictionary entries often contain factual information about what the word refers to.

== Pre-modern encyclopedias ==
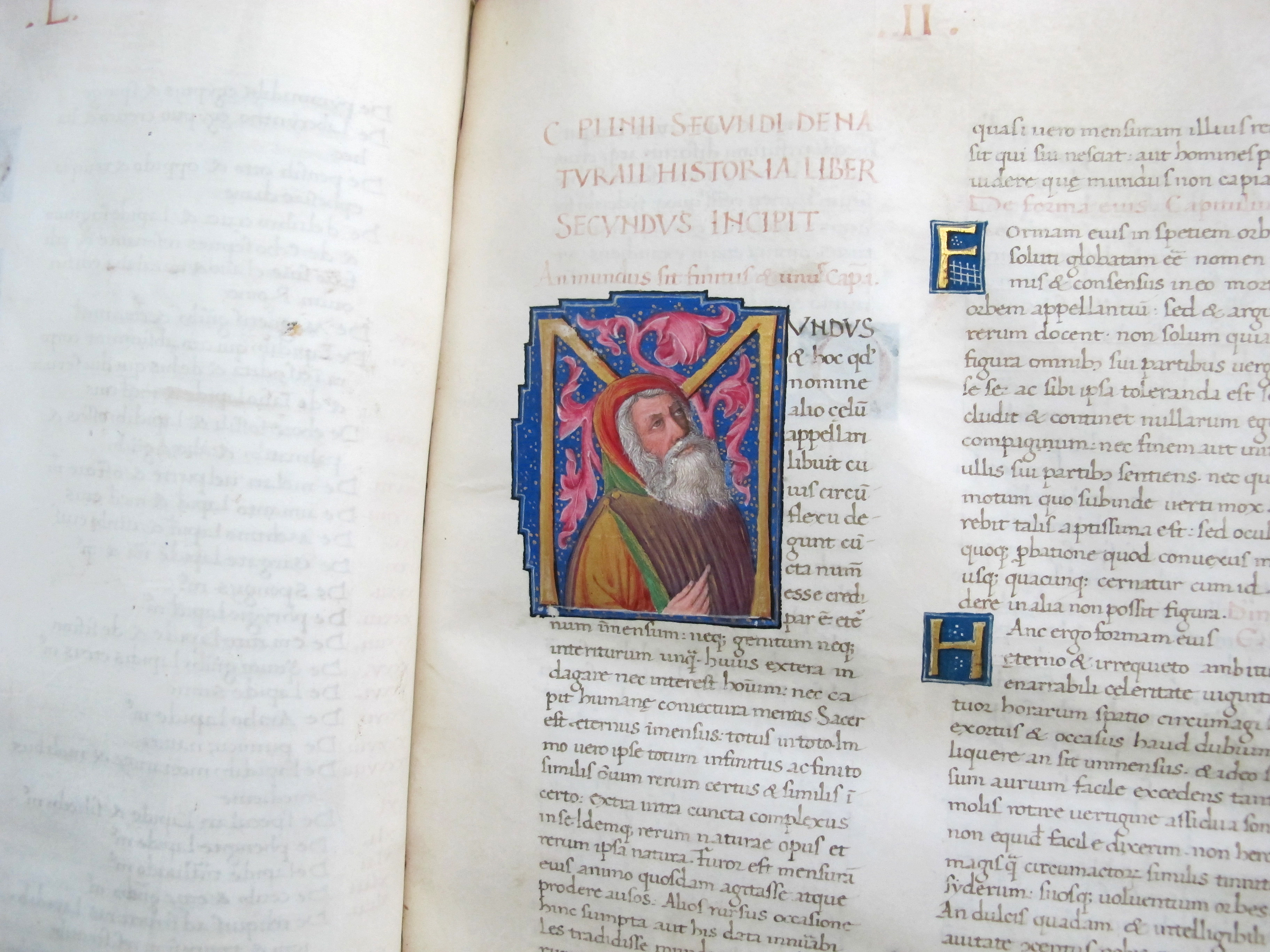
Pliny the Elder's Natural History is one of the oldest extant encyclopedias.

The earliest encyclopedic work to have survived to modern times is the Natural History of Pliny the Elder, a Roman statesman living in the 1st century AD, a work modelled on that of Varro (1st century BCE). Pliny compiled a work of 37 chapters covering natural history, architecture, medicine, geography, geology, and all aspects of the world around him. This work became very popular in antiquity, was one of the first classical manuscripts to be printed in 1470, and has remained popular ever since as a source of information on the Roman world, especially its art, technology, and engineering.

The Spanish scholar Isidore of Seville was the first Christian writer to try to compile a summa of universal knowledge, the Etymologiae (c. 600–625), also known by classicists as the Origines (abbreviated Orig.). This encyclopedia—the first such Christian epitome—formed a huge compilation of 448 chapters in 20 books based on hundreds of classical sources, including the Naturalis Historia. Of the Etymologiae in its time it was said quaecunque fere sciri debentur, "practically everything that it is necessary to know". Among the areas covered were grammar, rhetoric, mathematics, geometry, music, astronomy, medicine, law, the Catholic Church and heretical sects, pagan philosophers, languages, cities, animals and birds, the physical world, geography, public buildings, roads, metals, rocks, agriculture, ships, clothes, food, and tools.

Another Christian encyclopedia was the Institutiones divinarum et saecularium litterarum of Cassiodorus (543–560), dedicated to the Christian divinity and the seven liberal arts. The encyclopedia of Suda, a massive 10th-century Byzantine encyclopedia, had 30,000 entries (broadly alphabetically arranged), many drawn from ancient sources that have since been lost, and often derived from medieval Christian compilers.

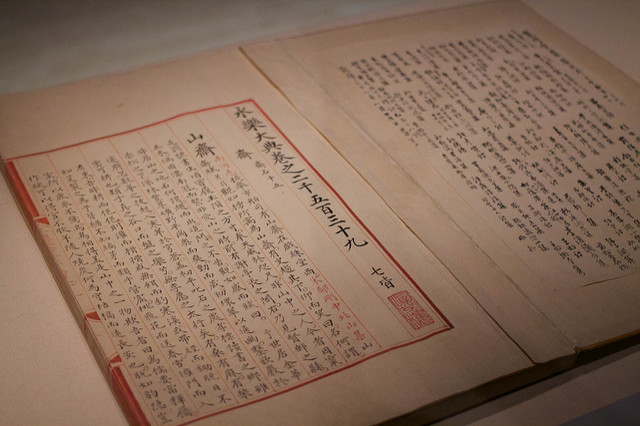
The Yongle Encyclopedia is the largest paper encyclopedia of world history

From India, the Siribhoovalaya (Kannada: ಸಿರಿಭೂವಲಯ), variously dated to c. 800 AD, the 15th century, or an even more recent time, is a work of Kannada literature written by Kumudendu Muni, a Jain monk. It is unique because rather than employing alphabets, it is composed entirely in Kannada numerals. Many philosophies which existed in the Jain classics are eloquently and skillfully interpreted in the work.

The 2nd century BC reference work Shiben has been described as a Chinese encyclopedia of genealogies, while the Huanglan, completed in the 220s, was an early leishu encyclopedia. The Yiwen Leiju, completed in 624, was a landmark literature encyclopedia of the early Tang dynasty; other important leishu encyclopedias from the Tang include the Chuxue ji and Liutie. The Tongdian, Tongzhi and Wenxian Tongkao were three comprehensive institutional encyclopedias of the Tang, Song and Yuan dynasties, and were collectively referred to as the Three Tongs (Santong). The enormous encyclopedic works of the Four Great Books of Song, compiled by the 11th century during the early Song dynasty (960–1279), was a massive literary undertaking for the time. The last encyclopedia of the four, the Prime Tortoise of the Record Bureau, amounted to 9.4 million Chinese characters in 1,000 written volumes. The Yongle Encyclopedia (completed 1408) comprised 11,095 volumes, making it the largest paper encyclopedia in world history.

There were many great encyclopedists throughout Chinese history, including the scientist and statesman Shen Kuo (1031–1095) with his Dream Pool Essays of 1088; the statesman, inventor, and agronomist Wang Zhen (active 1290–1333) with his Nong Shu of 1313; and Song Yingxing (1587–1666) with his Tiangong Kaiwu. Song Yingxing was termed the "Diderot of China" by British historian Joseph Needham.

== Printed encyclopedias ==
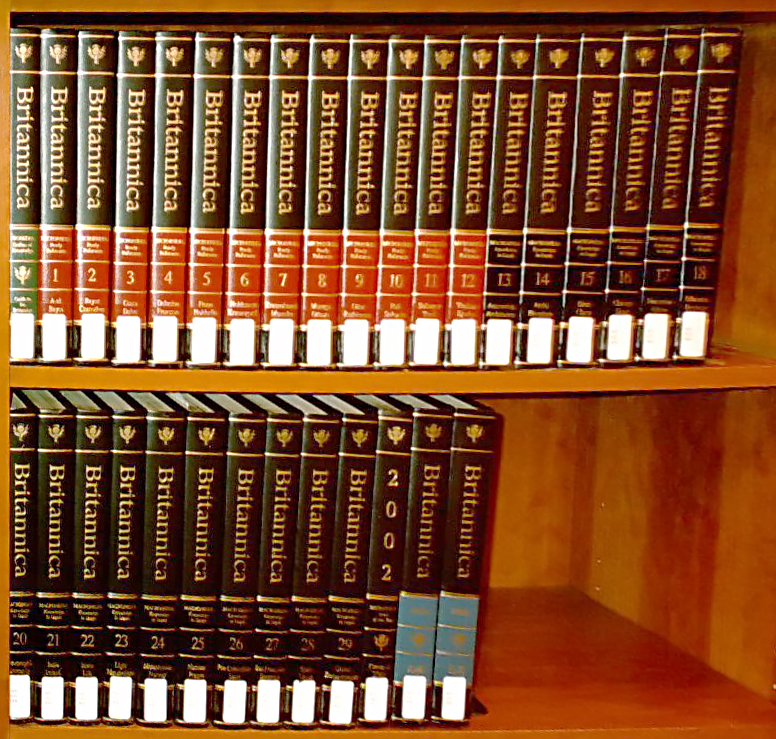
Britannica 15th edition printed encyclopedias, 2002

Before the advent of the printing press, encyclopedic works were all hand-copied and thus rarely available, beyond wealthy patrons or monastic men of learning: they were expensive, and usually written for those extending knowledge rather than those using it. The introduction of printing from Asia allowed a wider diffusion of encyclopedias and every scholar could have his or her copy. Nuremberg Chronicle from 1493 is one of the best-documented early printed books—an incunabulum—and one of the first to successfully integrate illustrations and text. Both Latin and German editions were printed by Anton Koberger in Nuremberg. The De expetendis et fugiendis rebus by Giorgio Valla was posthumously printed in 1501 by Aldo Manuzio in Venice. This work followed the traditional scheme of liberal arts. However, Valla added the translation of ancient Greek works on mathematics (firstly by Archimedes), newly discovered and translated. The Margarita Philosophica by Gregor Reisch, printed in 1503, was a complete encyclopedia explaining the seven liberal arts.

Financial, commercial, legal, and intellectual factors changed the size of encyclopedias. Middle classes had more time to read and encyclopedias helped them to learn more. Publishers wanted to increase their output so some countries like Germany started selling books missing alphabetical sections, to publish faster. Also, publishers could not afford all the resources by themselves, so multiple publishers would come together with their resources to create better encyclopedias. Later, rivalry grew, causing copyright to occur due to weak underdeveloped laws. John Harris is often credited with introducing the now-familiar alphabetic format in 1704 with his English Lexicon Technicum: Or, A Universal English Dictionary of Arts and Sciences: Explaining not only the Terms of Art, but the Arts Themselves – to give its full title. Organized alphabetically, its content does indeed contain an explanation not merely of the terms used in the arts and sciences, but of the arts and sciences themselves. Sir Isaac Newton contributed his only published work on chemistry to the second volume of 1710.

=== Encyclopédie ===
Indeed, the purpose of an encyclopedia is to collect knowledge disseminated around the globe; to set forth its general system to the men with whom we live, and transmit it to those who will come after us, so that the work of preceding centuries will not become useless to the centuries to come; and so that our offspring, becoming better instructed, will at the same time become more virtuous and happy, and that we should not die without having rendered a service to the human race in the future years to come.

— Diderot

The Encyclopédie, ou dictionnaire raisonné des sciences, des arts et des métiers (French for 'Encyclopedia, or a Systematic Dictionary of the Sciences, Arts and Crafts'), better known as the Encyclopédie (French: [ɑ̃siklɔpedi]), was a general encyclopedia published in France between 1751 and 1772, with later supplements, revised editions, an index, and translations. It had many contributors, known among contemporaries as the Encyclopédistes. It was edited by Denis Diderot and, until 1759, co-edited by Jean le Rond d'Alembert.

The Encyclopédie is most famous for representing the thought of the Enlightenment. According to Diderot in the article "Encyclopédie", the Encyclopédie's aim was "to change the way people think" and to allow people to inform themselves. Diderot hoped the Encyclopédie would disseminate a vast amount of knowledge to the present and future generations. Thus, it is an example of democratization of knowledge, though the high price of the first edition especially (980 livres) prevented it from being bought by much of the middle class.

The Encyclopédie was also the first encyclopedia to include contributions from many named contributors, and it was the first general encyclopedia to describe the mechanical arts in much detail. In the first edition, seventeen folio volumes of text were accompanied by eleven volumes of engravings. Later editions were published in smaller formats and with fewer engravings in order to reach a wider audience within Europe.

=== Encyclopædia Britannica ===
The Encyclopædia Britannica (Latin for 'British Encyclopædia') is a general-knowledge English-language encyclopaedia. It has been published since 1768 and, after several ownership changes, is currently owned by Encyclopædia Britannica, Inc. The 15th edition, published in 1974, spans 32 volumes and 32,640 pages and was the last printed edition. Since 2016, it has been published online at Britannica.com.

Printed for 245 years, the Britannica was the longest-running in-print encyclopaedia in the English language. It was first published between 1768 and 1771 in Edinburgh, Scotland, in weekly instalments that came together to form three volumes. At first, the encyclopaedia grew quickly in size from edition to edition. The second edition expanded to 10 volumes, and by its fourth edition (1801–1810), it had expanded to 20 volumes. Since the beginning of the twentieth century, its size, measured as total word count, has remained roughly steady at about 40 million words.

The Britannica has had many notable contributors. The 9th (1875–1889) and 11th editions (1911) are considered landmark encyclopaedias for scholarship and literary style. Following its acquisition in 1901 by an American firm and starting with the 11th edition, the encyclopaedia shortened and simplified articles to broaden its appeal to the North American market. Though published in the United States since 1901, the Britannica has mostly maintained British English spellings.

In 1932, the Britannica adopted a policy of "continuous revision," in which the encyclopaedia is continually revised and reprinted, with every article updated on a schedule. The publishers of Compton's Pictured Encyclopedia had already pioneered such a policy.

The 15th edition (1974–2010) has a three-part structure: a 12-volume Micropædia of short articles (generally fewer than 750 words), a 17-volume Macropædia of long articles (two to 310 pages), and a single Propædia volume to give a hierarchical outline of knowledge. The Micropædia was meant for quick fact-checking and as a guide to the Macropædia; readers are advised to study the Propædia outline to understand a subject's context and to find more detailed articles.

In the 21st century, Britannica faced competition: initially from the digital and multimedia encyclopaedia Microsoft Encarta, and later from the online mass-collaboration encyclopaedia Wikipedia. While it continued to score well in assessments of overall quality, compared to its competitors, it could not (as an expert-authored compilation of a limited number of articles on important subjects only) match their breadth of coverage and continuous updating.

In March 2012, it announced it would no longer publish printed editions and would focus instead on the online version.

=== Brockhaus Enzyklopädie ===
The Brockhaus Enzyklopädie (German for Brockhaus Encyclopedia) is a German-language encyclopedia which until 2009 was published by the F. A. Brockhaus printing house.

The first edition originated in the Conversations-Lexikon published by Renatus Gotthelf Löbel and C.W. Franke in Leipzig 1796–1808. Renamed Der Große Brockhaus in 1928 and Brockhaus Enzyklopädie from 1966, the 21st thirty-volume edition contains about 300,000 entries on about 24,000 pages, with about 40,000 maps, graphics and tables. It is the largest German-language printed encyclopedia in the 21st century.

In 2008, F. A. Brockhaus began the changeover to an online encyclopedia and the discontinuation of the printed editions. The rights to the Brockhaus trademark were purchased by Arvato, a subsidiary of the Bertelsmann media group. After more than 200 years, the distribution of the Brockhaus encyclopedia ceased completely in 2014.

=== Encyclopedias in the United States ===
In the United States, the 1950s and 1960s saw the introduction of several large popular encyclopedias, often sold on installment plans. The best known of these were World Book and Funk and Wagnalls. As many as 90% were sold door to door. Jack Lynch says in his book You Could Look It Up that encyclopedia salespeople were so common that they became the butt of jokes. He describes their sales pitch saying, "They were selling not books but a lifestyle, a future, a promise of social mobility." A 1961 World Book ad said, "You are holding your family's future in your hands right now," while showing a feminine hand holding an order form. As of the 1990s, two of the most prominent encyclopedias published in the United States were Collier's Encyclopedia and Encyclopedia Americana.

== Digital encyclopedias ==
=== Physical media ===
By the late 20th century, encyclopedias were being published on CD-ROMs for use with personal computers. This was the usual way computer users accessed encyclopedic knowledge from the 1980s and 1990s. Later, DVD discs replaced CD-ROMs, and by the mid-2000s, internet encyclopedias were dominant and replaced disc-based software encyclopedias.

CD-ROM encyclopedias were usually a macOS or Microsoft Windows (3.0, 3.1 or 95/98) application on a CD-ROM disc. The user would execute the encyclopedia's software program to see a menu that allowed them to start browsing the encyclopedia's articles, and most encyclopedias also supported a way to search the contents of the encyclopedia. The article text was usually hyperlinked and also included photographs, audio clips (for example in articles about historical speeches or musical instruments), and video clips. In the CD-ROM age, the video clips usually had a low resolution, often 160x120 or 320x240 pixels. Such encyclopedias which made use of photos, audio and video were also called multimedia encyclopedias.

Microsoft's Encarta, launched in 1993, was a landmark example. It featured around 25,000 articles, supplemented with 7,000 high-quality images, 9 hours of audio files, and 30 videos. After sixteen years, Microsoft discontinued the Encarta line of products in 2009 with the rise of the Internet. Other examples of CD-ROM encyclopedia are Grolier Multimedia Encyclopedia and Britannica.

Digital encyclopedias enable "Encyclopedia Services" (such as Wikimedia Enterprise) to facilitate programmatic access to the content.

=== Online ===
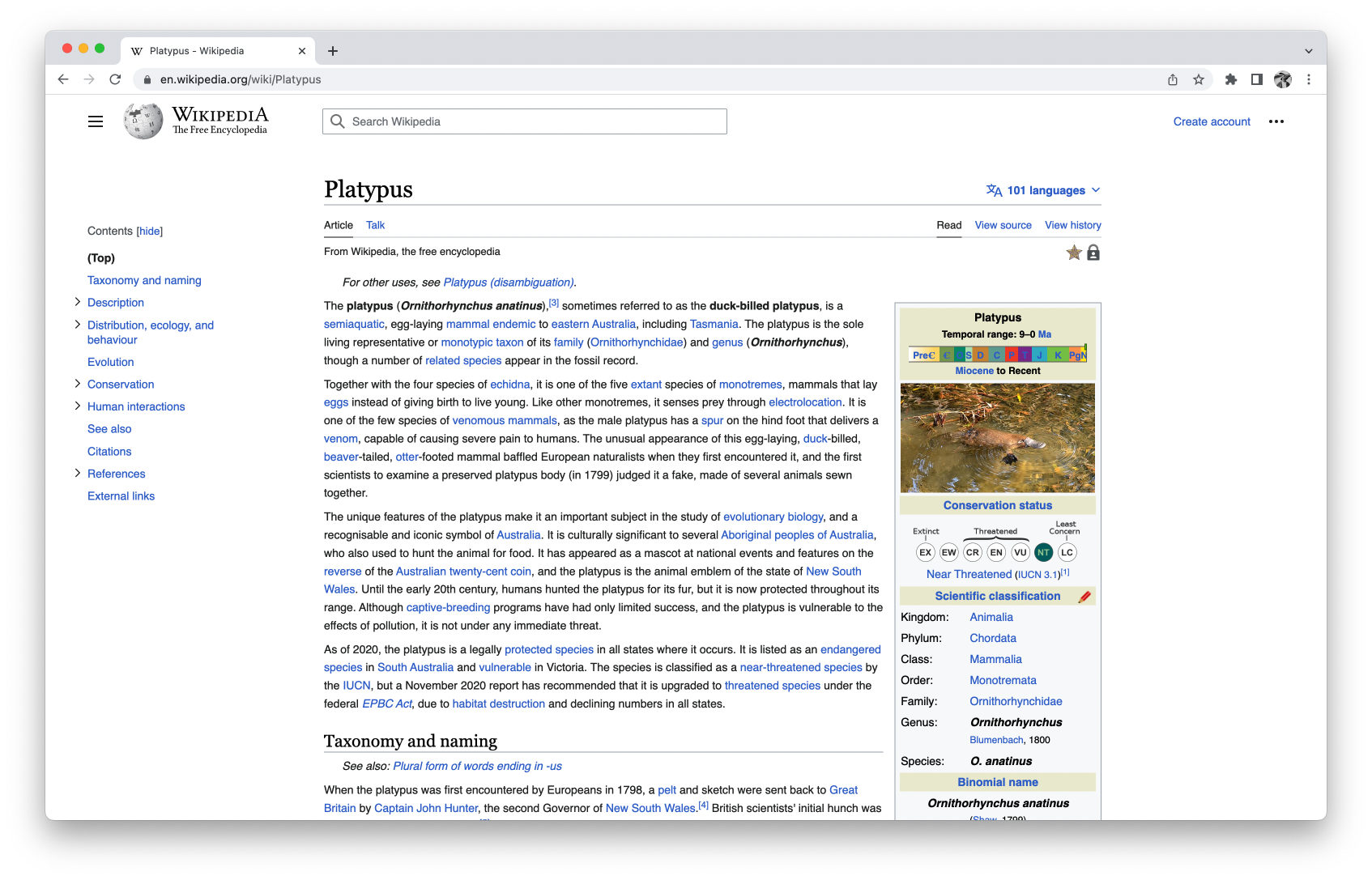
Wikipedia is an example of an online encyclopedia, the content of which is created by volunteer contributors.

An online encyclopedia, also called an Internet encyclopedia, is a digital encyclopedia accessible through the Internet. Some examples include pre-World Wide Web services that offered the Academic American Encyclopedia beginning in 1980, Encyclopedia.com since 1998, Encarta from 2000 to 2009, Wikipedia since 2001, Encyclopædia Britannica beginning in 1994 (now at Britannica.com), and Grokipedia since 2025.

==== Free encyclopedias ====
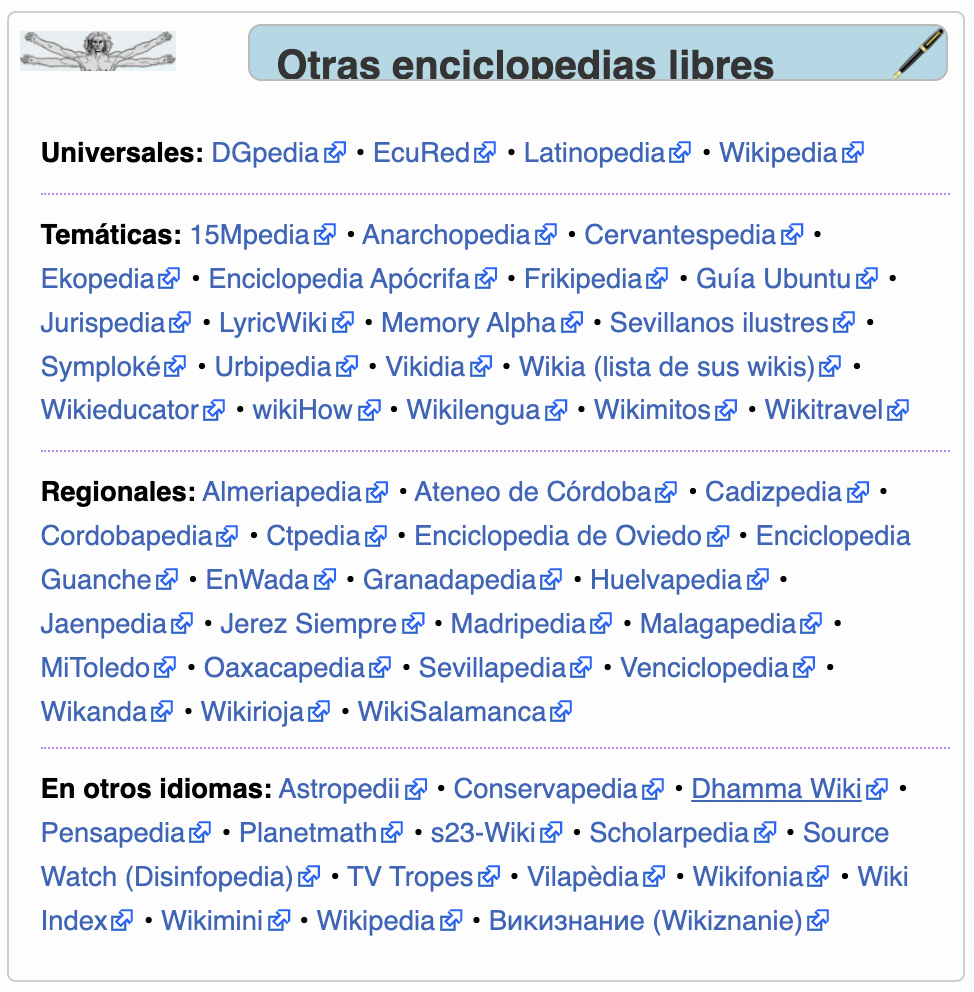
List of other free encyclopedias, from Enciclopedia Libre

The concept of a free encyclopedia began with the Interpedia proposal on Usenet in 1993, which outlined an Internet-based online encyclopedia to which anyone could submit content that would be freely accessible. Early projects in this vein included Everything2 and Open Site. In 1999, Richard Stallman proposed the GNUPedia, an online encyclopedia similar to other free GNU resources.

It was not until Nupedia and later Wikipedia that a stable free encyclopedia project could be established on the Internet.

The English Wikipedia, which was started in 2001, became the world's largest encyclopedia in 2004 at the 300,000-article stage. By late 2005, Wikipedia had produced over two million articles in more than 80 languages with content licensed under the copyleft GNU Free Documentation License. As of August 2009, Wikipedia had over 3 million articles in English and well over 10 million combined articles in over 250 languages. Today, Wikipedia has 7,264,817 articles in English, over 60 million combined articles in over 300 languages, and over 250 million combined pages including project and discussion pages.

Since 2002, other free encyclopedias appeared, including Hudong (2005–) and Baidu Baike (2006–) in Chinese, and Google's Knol (2008–2012) in English. Some MediaWiki-based encyclopedias have appeared, usually under a license compatible with Wikipedia, including the Spanish encyclopedia Enciclopedia Libre (2002–2021) and the English encyclopedias Conservapedia (2006–), Scholarpedia (2006–), and Citizendium (2007–).

== See also ==
- Bibliography of encyclopedias
- Biographical dictionary
- Encyclopedic knowledge
- Encyclopedism
- Fictitious entry
- Lexicography
- Library science
- Lists of encyclopedias
- Thesaurus
- Speculum literature
