= Sun Jian (disambiguation) =

Sun Jian (155–191) was a warlord in the late Han dynasty.

Sun Jian or Jian Sun may also refer to:

- Sun Jian (politician) (1936–1997), Vice Premier of the People's Republic of China from 1975 to 1978
- Jian Sun (researcher), Chinese-born electronics researcher at Rensselaer Polytechnic Institute, New York
- Sun Jian (sport shooter) (born 1991), Chinese sport shooter
