= Fan Jian =

Fan Jian may refer to:

- Fan Jian (politician) (250s–263), Chinese politician of the state of Shu Han in the late Three Kingdoms period
- Fan Jian (legal scholar) (born 1957), Chinese legal scholar
- Fan Jian (officer) (born 1960), Chinese government accountant
