= Liu Jian =

Liu Jian may refer to:

- Liu Jian (diplomat) (born 1956), Chinese ambassador to Afghanistan, Malaysia, and Pakistan
- Liu Jian (Volkswagen) (died 2010), head of Shanghai Volkswagen
- Liu Jian (director) (born 1969), Chinese animation filmmaker
- Liu Jian (footballer) (born 1984), Chinese association footballer
- Liu Jian (rower) (born 1974), Chinese Olympic rower
- Jian Liu (academic) (born 1962), American pharmacologist
