= Chen Jian =

Chen Jian is the name of:

- Chen Jian (diplomat) (born 1942), Chinese diplomat
- Chen Jian (politician, born 1952), Chinese politician who served as vice minister of Commerce from 2008 to 2013.
- Chen Jian (politician, born 1961), Chinese politician who served as party secretary of Dali Bai Autonomous Prefecture from 2017 to 2021.
- Chen Jian (academic), professor of Chinese history and international relations at Cornell University
