= Xu Jian =

Xu Jian may refer to:

- Xu Jian (Tang dynasty) (徐堅; 659–729), Tang dynasty writer and official
- Xu Jian (diplomat) (徐坚; born 1956), former Chinese ambassador to Poland, Romania, and Slovenia
- Xu Jian (engineer) (徐建; born 1958), Chinese civil engineer
- Xu Jian (softball), Chinese softball player
