= Wang Jian =

Wang Jian or Jian Wang may refer to:

- Wang Jian (Qin) (王翦; fl. 220s BC), Qin general
- Qi Wang Jian (齊王建; r. 264–221 BC), the last king of Qi.
- Wang Jian (Southern Qi) (王儉; 452–489), Liu Song and Southern Qi official
- Wang Jian (poet) (王建; 767–830), Tang dynasty poet
- Wang Jian (Former Shu) (王建; 847–918), founding emperor of Former Shu
- Wang Jian (17th-century painter) (王鑒; 1598–1677), painter during the Ming and Qing dynasties
- Wang Jian (geneticist) (汪建; born 1954), Chinese geneticist and biotechnology entrepreneur
- Jian Wang (contemporary painter) (王健; born 1958), U.S.-based Chinese painter
- Wang Jian (businessman) (王健; 1961–2018), co-founder of Hainan Airlines and HNA Group
- Wang Jian (computer scientist) (王坚; born 1962), Chinese computer scientist
- Jian Wang (cellist) (王健; born 1968), U.K.-based Chinese cellist
- Wang Jian (powerlifter), Chinese powerlifter
- Wang Jian (table tennis) (王健), Chinese table tennis player
- Wang Jian (born 1965) (王健; born 1965), Chinese politician, alternate member of the 20th Central Committee of the Chinese Communist Party

== See also ==
- Taejo of Goryeo (877–943), personal name Wang Geon, pronounced Wang Jian in Chinese
- Wang Jianan (disambiguation)
