= Wuhou Shrine, Chengdu =

Historical site in Chengdu

Wuhou Shrine
- 武侯祠 (Chinese); 漢昭烈廟 (Chinese)
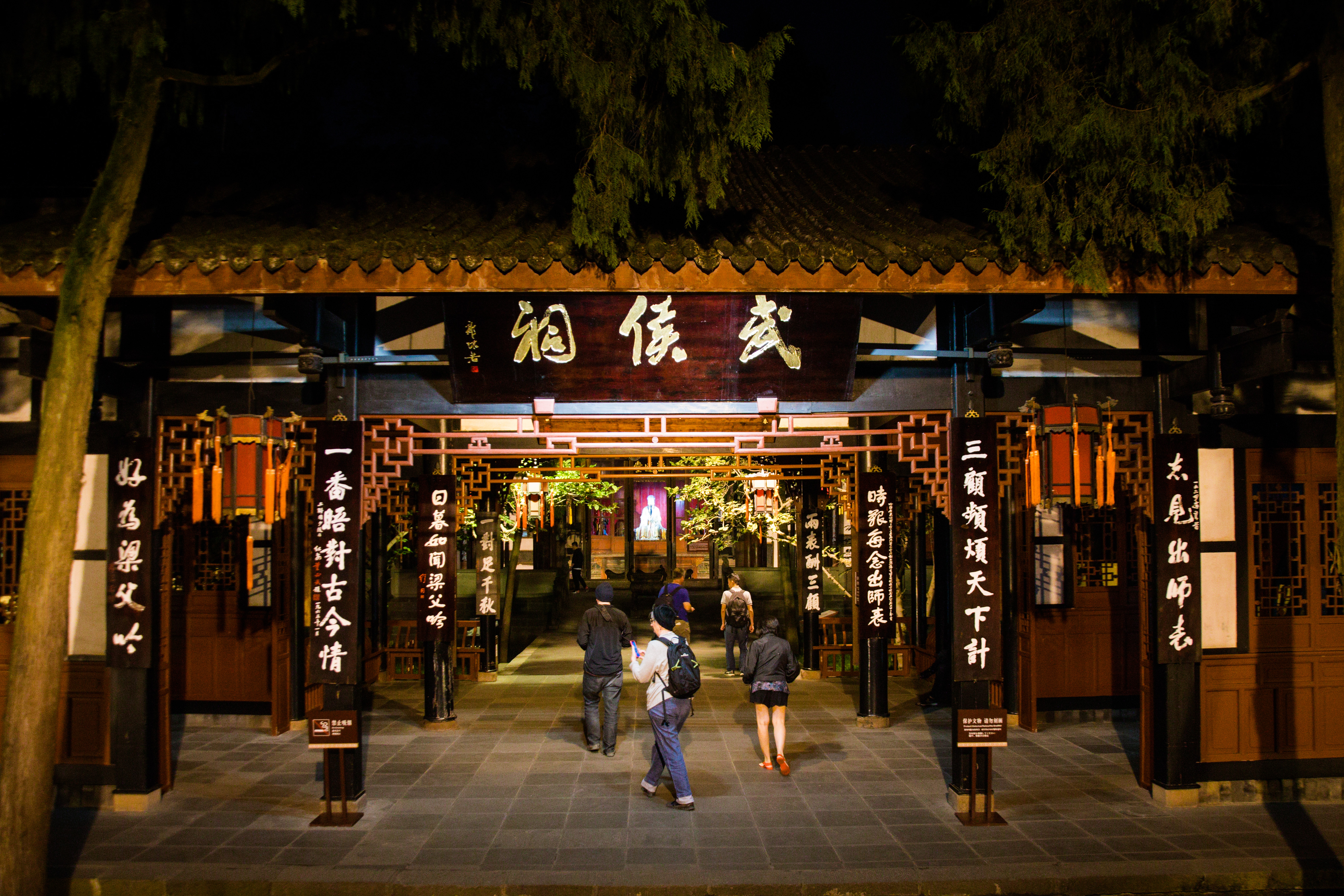
- Gate to the Hall of Zhuge Liang
- Interactive map of Wuhou Shrine
- Type: Ci shrine
- Location: Wuhou District, Chengdu, Sichuan

History
- Built: 223
- Rebuilt: 1672

Site notes
- Website: en.wuhouci.net.cn

The Wuhou Shrine, also known as the Wuhou Temple or Wuhouci (Chinese: 武侯祠), is a shrine in Chengdu. The site contains the Han Zhaolie Temple (simplified Chinese: 汉昭烈庙; traditional Chinese: 漢昭烈廟), which commemorates Liu Bei (161 – 223), the founding emperor of Shu Han, and the Wuhou Shrine proper, which is dedicated to Zhuge Liang (181 – 234), the state's prime minister. The name "Wuhou" (武侯) is derived from the noble title of Zhuge Liang, Wuxiang hou ("Marquis of Wuxiang", 武乡侯; 武鄉侯), and his posthumous name, Zhongwu (忠武). Hui Mausoleum (惠陵), the tomb of Liu Bei, is also located within the temple complex.

== History ==
Liu Bei was buried in the Hui Mausoleum in the southern suburbs of Chengdu in 223, and the Han Zhaolie Temple was built near the tomb. After Zhuge Liang died in 234, many requested that shrines commemorating him be built. However, emperor Liu Shan rejected proposals to establish a shrine dedicated to Zhuge Liang in Chengdu. The first Wuhou shrine in Chengdu was built 70 years later in 304, when Li Xiong declared himself King of Chengdu.

The Wuhou Shrine at its present location was first established in the 5th century. By the Tang dynasty, the shrine had become a well-known attraction of Chengdu. Shu Xiang (the Premier of Shu), a famous poem by Du Fu, described a visit to the shrine in the mid-8th century.

During the early Ming dynasty, Zhu Chun (朱椿), Prince of Shu, abolished the Wuhou Shrine on the ground that temples to an emperor and a prime minister side by side run contrary to Confucian norms. Instead, a statue of Zhuge Liang was added to the Hall of Liu Bei. The temple structures were burned down during the wars at the end of the Ming dynasty. In 1672, the Wuhou Shrine was rebuilt to its current layout, with separate halls for Liu Bei and Zhuge Liang. However, the base of the Hall of Liu Bei was raised higher than that of Zhuge Liang.

== Structure ==
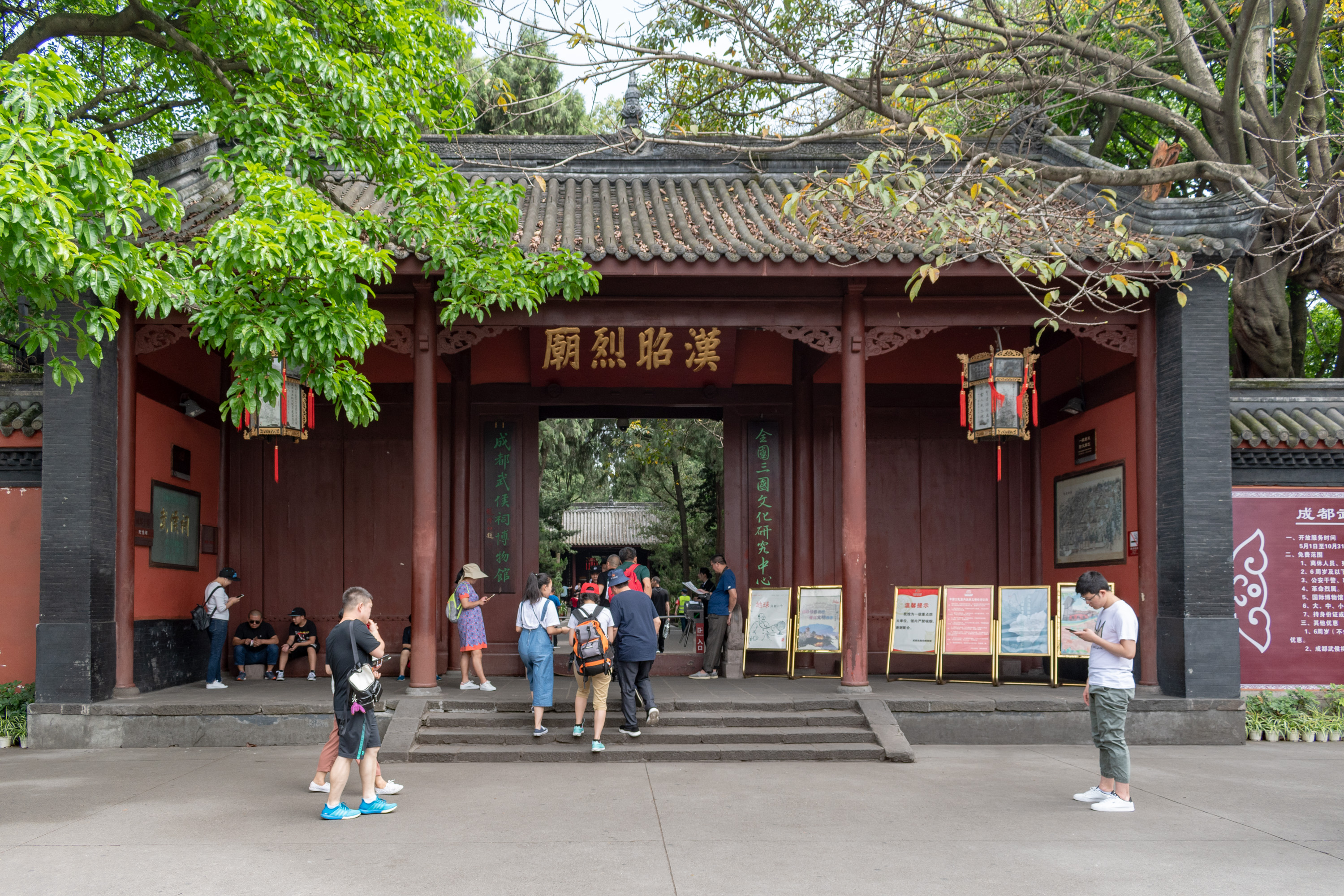
Main gate of the shrine

The main gate and halls of Liu Bei and Zhuge Liang are aligned on a north-south axis, while the tomb of Liu Bei is located to their west. The gate, with a plaque "Han Zhaolie Temple", opens to the south. Two stelae stand in the first courtyard, dating to 809 and 1547, respectively. The former features inscriptions penned by Pei Du with calligraphy by Liu Gongchuo (柳公綽).

The Hall of Liu Bei stands behind a second gate. A 3-meter-high statue of Liu Bei sits in the middle of the hall, flanked by attendants. Side halls commemorate Guan Yu and Zhang Fei, together with their families.In front of the hall is an iron ding with two dragons, cast in 1483. Two galleries adjacent to the Hall of Liu Bei contain statues to 28 civil officials and generals of Shu Han, headed by Pang Tong and Zhao Yun, respectively. The text of Chu Shi Biao, written by Zhuge Liang, is engraved along the southern side of the galleries. The calligraphy is commonly attributed to Yue Fei, general of the Song dynasty.

The Hall of Zhuge Liang is located behind the Hall of Liu Bei, and houses sitting statues of Zhuge Liang as well as his son Zhuge Zhan and grandson Zhuge Shang. Three bronze drums, including one dating from before the 6th century, are placed before the statues.
