= Hejian (disambiguation) =

Hejian is a city in Cangzhou, Hebei, China.

Hejian may also refer to:

- Hejian Kingdom, in early Imperial China
- Hejian, Henan, a township-level division of Henan, China
- Hejian Technology Corporation, a Chinese semiconductor foundry
- The Chinese name of the star Gamma Herculis

== See also ==
- He Jian (1887–1956), Chinese Nationalist general and politician in the Republic of China
- He Jian (born 1965), Chinese politician
- Hejiang (disambiguation)
