= Dong Jue =

3rd century Shu Han official and general

- 董厥

Regular Mounted Attendant (散騎常侍)
- In office 264 – ?
- Monarch: Cao Huan

Military Adviser to the Chancellor of State (相國參軍)
- In office 264 – ?
- Monarch: Cao Huan

Senior General Who Assists the State (輔國大將軍)
- In office ? – 263
- Monarch: Liu Shan

General-in-Chief (大將軍)
- In office ?–?
- Monarch: Liu Shan

Prefect of the Masters of Writing (尚書令)
- In office 258 – 261
- Monarch: Liu Shan
- Preceded by: Chen Zhi
- Succeeded by: Fan Jian

Supervisor of the Masters of Writing (尚書僕射)
- In office 234 – 258
- Monarch: Liu Shan

Chief Clerk and Registrar in the Office of the Imperial Chancellor (丞相府令史及主簿)
- In office 234 – 258
- Monarch: Liu Shan
- Chancellor: Zhuge Liang

Personal details
- Born: Unknown; Zaoyang, Hubei
- Died: Unknown
- Occupation: Official, general
- Courtesy name: Gongxi (龔襲)
- Peerage: Marquis of Nan District (南鄉侯)

Dong Jue (fl. 220s–260s), courtesy name Gongxi, was an official and military general of the state of Shu Han in the late Three Kingdoms period of China. He continued serving as an official in the state of Cao Wei, which conquered Shu Han in 263.

== Life ==
Along with Fan Jian, Dong Jue served as a clerk and registrar under Zhuge Liang, the Imperial Chancellor of Shu, during the Southern Campaign and Northern Expeditions. After Zhuge Liang's death in 234, he was appointed as Supervisor of the Masters of Writing and later as the Prefect of the Masters of Writing in 258 to replace Chen Zhi. He was later promoted to General-in-Chief and Senior General Who Assists the State. The Shu emperor Liu Shan also enfeoffed him as the Marquis of Nan District.

Dong Jue subsequently assisted the Shu general Jiang Wei in the defence of Jiange in 263. He also attempted to counsel Liu Shan, but was unable to mitigate the influence of the eunuch Huang Hao, whom Liu Shan trusted. Liu Shan ultimately relegated him to the task of book-keeping to reduce his interference in state affairs. After the fall of Shu, Dong Jue continued serving as an official in the Cao Wei state as a military adviser to the Chancellor of State and as a Regular Mounted Attendant.

== See also ==
- Lists of people of the Three Kingdoms
