= Li Jian =

Li Jian or Jian Li may refer to:

== Footballers ==
- Li Jian (footballer, born 1977), Chinese football goalkeeper
- Li Jian (footballer, born March 1985), Chinese football defender
- Li Jian (footballer, born September 1985), Chinese football goalkeeper who represents Hong Kong internationally
- Li Jian (footballer, born 1986), Chinese football forward
- Li Jian (footballer, born 1989), Chinese football midfielder

== Others ==
- Li Jian (singer) (born 1974), Chinese singer-songwriter
- Jian Li (engineer)
