= De expetendis et fugiendis rebus =

1501 encyclopedia by Giorgio Valla

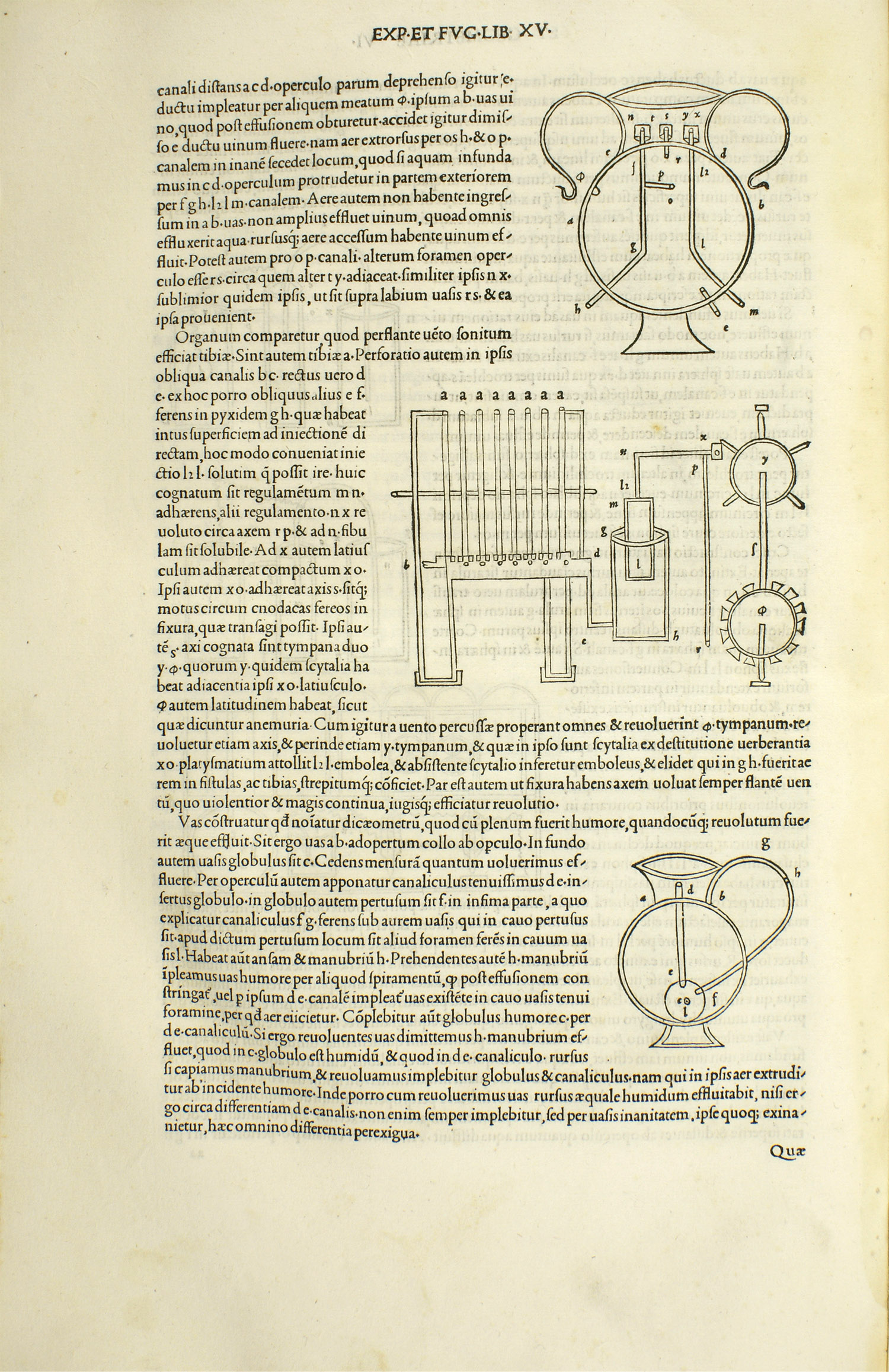
A page from the 1501 printing

De expetendis et fugiendis rebus (On seeking and avoiding things) is an encyclopedia which was compiled by Giorgio Valla in 49 books. Valla died in 1500 and the work was then published by his adopted son, Giovanni Pietro in 1501. It was printed in two large-format volumes by Aldus Manutius in Venice.
