= Chen Zhi (Three Kingdoms) =

Chinese official of the state of Shu Han (died 258)

- 陳祗

General Who Guards the Army (鎮軍將軍)
- In office 251 – 258
- Monarch: Liu Shan

Prefect of the Masters of Writing (尚書令)
- In office 251 – 258
- Monarch: Liu Shan
- Preceded by: Lü Yi
- Succeeded by: Dong Jue

Palace Attendant (侍中)
- In office 246 – 258
- Monarch: Liu Shan

Personal details
- Born: Unknown (Note: While Chen Zhi's birth year was not recorded, his biography in Sanguozhi indicated that he was raised by his granduncle Xu Jing, who died in c.October 222. Combined with the observation that he already had a reputation before the age of 20 (and thus joined the Shu bureaucracy in his 20s), it is likely that Chen Zhi's childhood occurred in the 210s.) Pingyu County Henan
- Died: 258 (Note: According to Chen Zhi's biography in the Sanguozhi, he died in the 1st year of the Jingyao era. Furthermore, volume 7 of Huayang Guo Zhi recorded that Chen Zhi died on the bingzi day of the 8th month. However, his death is put in the segment of the 2nd year of the Jingyao era of Liu Shan's reign. Since Chen Shou's account is closer to the historical events and part of the Twenty-Four Histories canon of ancient Chinese history. It is considered as a more reliable year of death.) Chengdu, Sichuan
- Relations: Xu Jing (granduncle)
- Children: Chen Can; Chen Yu
- Occupation: Official
- Courtesy name: Fengzong (奉宗)
- Posthumous name: Marquis Zhong (忠侯)

Chen Zhi (died 258), courtesy name Fengzong, was an official of the state of Shu Han during the Three Kingdoms period of China. He is mostly known for his association with the infamous Huang Hao that allowed him to dominate the imperial court. However, he was also described as extremely talented and in favour of both Fei Yi and Liu Shan.

== Life ==
Chen Zhi was born in Runan Commandery (汝南郡), which is present-day Pingyu County, Henan. He was a maternal grandson of an elder brother of Xu Jing, who briefly served as Minister over the Masses of the state of Shu during the early Three Kingdoms period. As he was orphaned at a young age, he was raised by his granduncle Xu Jing.

Chen Zhi had quite a reputation in Shu by the time he reached adulthood (around 19 years old). He started his career as a low-level official in the selection bureau of the imperial secretariat of Shu. His appearance is described as awe-inspiring and his demeanour as restrained and strict. Moreover, he was well-versed in a variety of arts and crafts, possessing talent in astrology, divination and physiognomy. Therefore, he impressed Fei Yi, the head of the Shu government between 246 and 253. Following Dong Yun's death in late 246, Fei Yi recommended Chen Zhi to replace Dong Yun as a Palace Attendant (侍中).

Chen Zhi quickly earned the favour of the Shu emperor Liu Shan, and formed an alliance with the eunuch Huang Hao to dominate the political scene together. Huang Hao gained power for the first time in his life after Dong Yun's death because Dong Yun distrusted Huang Hao and actively kept him out of politics while he was still alive. Ever since Chen Zhi became one of his most favoured officials, Liu Shan gradually began to resent Dong Yun and see him as "arrogant and disrespectful". Chen Zhi and Huang Hao also often spoke ill of Dong Yun in front of Liu Shan and make the emperor hate Dong Yun even more.

When Lü Yi, the Prefect of the Masters of Writing (尚書令), died in 251, Liu Shan ordered Chen Zhi to replace him. In addition to his appointment as Prefect of the Masters of Writing, Chen Zhi concurrently held the positions of Palace Attendant (侍中) and General Who Guards the Army (鎮軍將軍). During this period, Jiang Wei was away on military campaigns against Shu's rival state Wei most of the time therefore he did not regularly attend imperial court sessions. Above, Chen Zhi would carry out the Emperor's orders and received Liu Shan's favour while below, he befriended the eunuchs and obtained Huang Hao's support. He was trusted and loved by both circles therefore although he ranked lower than the General-in-Chief Jiang Wei in the military hierarchy, he had greater influence and power in politics. (Note: As Prefect of the Masters of Writing, Chen Zhi was said to have blocked Pang Tong's son Pang Hong (龐宏) from getting promoted; Pang Hong was known for being frugal, upright and outspoken. He later died in office while serving as the Administrator (太守) of Fuling Commandery (涪陵郡).)

Chen Zhi died in 258. Liu Shan shed tears and deeply lamented his death, issued an imperial decree that said: "Chen Zhi managed the affairs of our time. His kindness and excellency were a model. His capability and solemness were a standard. He was in harmony with righteousness and brought benefit to everything. His myriad of achievements are brilliantly manifest. His life did not reach distantly, and I am grieved by that. One who in life has an excellent reputation, should in death be given a beautiful posthumous name. Let's honour him with the posthumous title "Marquis Zhong" (忠侯; "loyal marquis")."

After Chen Zhi's death, Huang Hao continued to rise through the ranks and gain greater power while showing favouritism towards his supporters and those who fawned on him. The Shu government also became more corrupt under Huang Hao's influence until its eventual collapse in 263.

== Family ==
Liu Shan enfeoffed Chen Zhi's first son, Chen Can (陳粲), as a Secondary Marquis (關內侯), and appointed his second son, Chen Yu (陳裕), as a Gentleman of the Yellow Gate (黃門侍郎).

== See also ==
- Lists of people of the Three Kingdoms
