= Jian (surname) =

簡/简
- Romanization: Wade-Giles: Chien; Hokkien: Kan; Teochew: Kean; Cantonese: Kan (Hong Kong) Gan (Macao)
- Pronunciation: jiǎn (jian3)

Origin
- Language: Chinese
- Meaning: bamboo slip, simple

Jiǎn (traditional Chinese: 簡; simplified Chinese: 简) is a Han surname meaning "bamboo slip" or "simple". It was the 382th surname listed on the Hundred Family Surnames. There are more people in Taiwan with this surname than any single province in Mainland China.

== Notable people ==
- Jian Yong (簡雍) (fl. 180s–210s), counselor of Liu Bei in the Late Eastern Han dynasty
- Jianzhi (簡之), courtesy name of Yao Silian (姚思廉; died 637), official of the Chinese dynasties Sui dynasty and Tang dynasty
- Sir Yuet-keung Kan GBE JP (Chinese: 簡悅強, 1913–2012), Hong Kong banker, politician and lawyer
- Victor Kan (簡華捷, Kan Wah Chit; born 1941), Hong Kong student of the late Yip Man
- Masayoshi Kan (簡 優好, Kan Masayoshi) (born 1972), Japanese sprinter
- Eugene Chien (traditional Chinese: 簡又新; simplified Chinese: 简又新; pinyin: Jiǎn Yòuxīn; Wade–Giles: Chiěn Yòu-hsīn) (born 1946), Taiwanese politician and diplomat
- Chien Yu-Hsiu (simplified Chinese: 简佑修; traditional Chinese: 簡佑修; pinyin: Jiǎn Yùxiù; Wade–Giles: Chien Yü-hsiu; born 1980) Chinese badminton player
- John Chien (簡啟聰主教, 1940–2013), third bishop of the Episcopal Diocese of Taiwan from 1988 to 2001
- Chien Tung-ming (Chinese: 簡東明; born 1951), Taiwanese aboriginal politician
- Jian Yi (Chinese: 簡藝; Simplified Chinese简艺；born 1975), Chinese filmmaker and activist
- Hideyoshi Kan (簡 秀吉, Hideyoshi Kan) (Born name is 簡 宏嘉; born 2002) Japanese actor
- Tony Jian (Chinese: 簡肇棟; pinyin: Jiǎn Zhàodòng; 1955–2024), Taiwanese physician and politician
- Aline Wong (Chinese: 簡麗中; pinyin: Jiǎn Lìzhòng; born 1941), former Singaporean sociologist and politician

== See also ==
- Jian (given name)
