= Hejiang =

Hejiang may refer to:

- Hejiang Province, a former province in Northeast China
- Hejiang County, in Sichuan, China
- Hejiang Subdistrict (合江街道), a subdistrict of Shigu District, Hengyang, Hunan.

== See also ==
- Hejian (disambiguation)
