= Zhuge Shang =

Chinese Shu Han state general (died 263)

- 諸葛尚
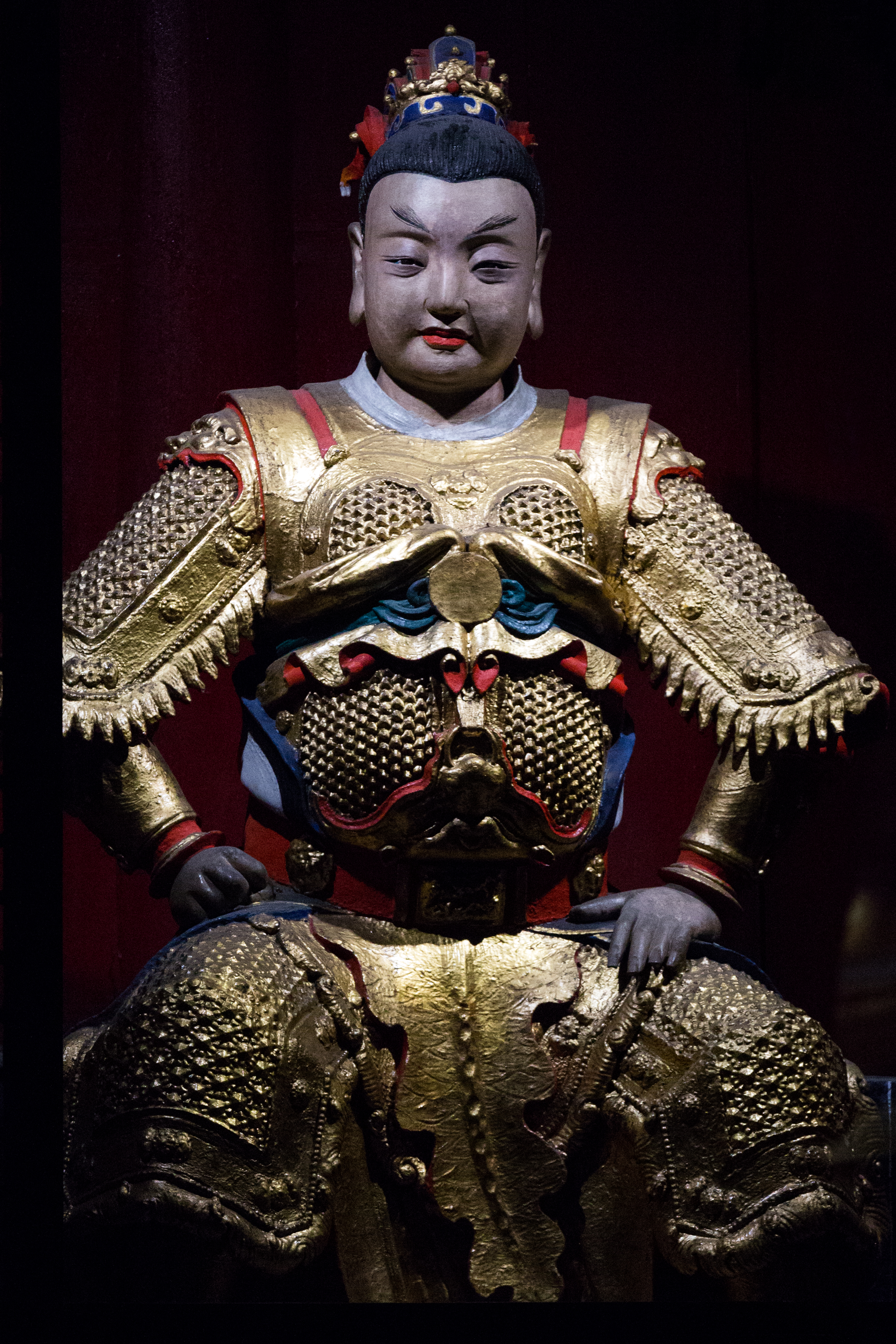
- Statue of Zhuge Shang in the Temple of Marquis Wu, Chengdu

Personal details
- Born: 240s
- Died: c.November 263
- Parent: Zhuge Zhan (father)
- Occupation: Military general

Zhuge Shang (240s - c.November 263) was a Chinese military general of the state of Shu Han in the Three Kingdoms period of China. He was the eldest son of the Shu general Zhuge Zhan and a grandson of Zhuge Liang, the first Chancellor of Shu.

In 263, Deng Ai, a general from Shu's rival state Cao Wei, led an army to attack Shu and showed up in Fu (涪; in present-day Mianyang, Sichuan) after taking a shortcut from Yinping (陰平; present-day Wen County, Longnan, Gansu). Zhuge Zhan led the Shu forces to Fu to resist the enemy but retreated to Mianzhu (緜竹) when he heard that the Shu vanguard had been defeated. Deng Ai sent a messenger to ask Zhuge Zhan to surrender, but Zhuge refused and executed the messenger. In the ensuing battle at Mianzhu, the Shu forces were defeated and both Zhuge Zhan and Zhuge Shang were killed in action. Before joining his father in battle, Zhuge Shang sighed, "My father and I received grace from the State. Our failure to eliminate Huang Hao earlier on resulted in our State being stuck in this disastrous situation now. What can we do with our lives?"

== See also ==
- Lists of people of the Three Kingdoms
