= Wang Jianan =

Wang Jianan may refer to:

- Wang Jian'an (王建安; 1908–1980), Chinese general
- Wang Jianan (table tennis) (汪佳男; born 1983), Congo table tennis player
- Wang Jianan (footballer) (王嘉楠; born 1993), Chinese footballer
- Wang Jianan (long jumper) (王嘉男; born 1996), Chinese long jumper

== See also ==
- Wang Jian (disambiguation)
