= Fan Jian (politician) =

3rd-century Chinese Shu Han official

- 樊建

Official Who Concurrently Serves in the Palace (給事中)
- In office 263 or after – ?
- Monarch: Cao Huan

Regular Mounted Attendant (散騎常侍)
- In office 263 or after – ?
- Monarch: Cao Huan

Army Adviser to the Chancellor of State (相國參軍)
- In office 263 or after – ?
- Monarch: Cao Huan

Prefect of the Masters of Writing (尚書令)
- In office 261 – 263
- Monarch: Liu Shan
- Preceded by: Dong Jue

Palace Attendant (侍中)
- In office ? – 263
- Monarch: Liu Shan

Personal details
- Born: Unknown Zaoyang, Hubei
- Died: Unknown
- Occupation: Politician
- Courtesy name: Changyuan (長元)

Fan Jian (fl. 250s–263), courtesy name Changyuan, was a Chinese politician of the state of Shu Han in the late Three Kingdoms period. He served briefly in the state of Cao Wei after the fall of Shu in 263.

== Life ==
Fan Jian was from Yiyang Commandery (義陽郡), which is around present-day Zaoyang, Hubei. He served as an official in the state of Shu Han in the Three Kingdoms period. The highest positions he reached in the Shu government were Palace Attendant (侍中) and Prefect of the Masters of Writing (尚書令). Along with Zhuge Zhan and Dong Jue, Fan Jian was one of the leading figures in the Shu government in the 250s and 260s. Despite his best efforts, he was unable to curb the negative influence of Huang Hao, an imperial eunuch highly favoured by the Shu emperor Liu Shan. After the fall of Shu in 263, Fan Jian served under Shu's rival state Cao Wei and travelled to the Wei imperial capital, Luoyang. He first served as an Army Adviser to the Chancellor of State (相國參軍) and was subsequently given the additional appointment of a Regular Mounted Attendant (散騎常侍). The Wei government sent him back to the former Shu territories to comfort the people. He was later promoted to the position of an Official Who Concurrently Serves in the Palace (給事中).

== See also ==
- Lists of people of the Three Kingdoms
