= Chuxue ji =

Chinese encyclopedia

Pages from the Chuxue ji

Chuxue ji (simplified Chinese: 初学记; traditional Chinese: 初學記; pinyin: Chūxué jì; "Notes to first learning") is a leishu (encyclopedic compendium) compiled by Xu Jian 徐坚 (659–727), Zhang Yue 张说, Wei Shu 韦述, and others.

This reference work, created for beginning students, consists of 30 juan and organizes its material into 23 main sections (bu 部) and 313 subcategories (zimu 子目), devoted “primarily to politics, but also to religion, zoology, astronomy, customs and usages, and other subjects.”

The bibliography of the Hanyu da zidian lists the 1962 edition published by the Zhonghua Book Company as the version used.

The style of the book bears some resemblance to that of the Yiwen leiju (Encyclopedia of Literary Collections), though it is not identical.

In the Siku quanshu zongmu tiyao, the annotated comprehensive catalogue of the Siku quanshu, it is said of the work:

「在唐人类书中，博不及《艺文类聚》，而精则胜之，若《北堂书钞》及《六帖》，则出此书之下远矣。」

(roughly translated:)

Among the leishu (encyclopedias) of the Tang dynasty, it is not as rich (bo) as the Yiwen leiju, but it is superior in essence (jing); Beitang shuchao and Liutie fall far short in comparison.

It is regarded as one of the classical texts relevant to the Zhuangzi.

== See also ==
- Leishu

== Bibliography ==
- Chuxue ji 初學記. 30 juan. By Xu Jian 徐堅 et al. Beijing: Zhonghua shuju 中華書局, 1962
- Li Xueqin, Lü Wenyu 呂文郁 (eds.): Siku da cidian 四庫大辭典. (2 vols.) Changchun: Jilin daxue chubanshe 1996, p. 2035ab
- Endymion Wilkinson: Chinese History: A Manual. 2000 (S. 601 ff.)
- Ssu-yü Teng und K. Biggerstaff: An Annotated Bibliography of Selected Chinese Reference Works, third edition, Cambridge/Mass.: Harvard University Press 1971
