= Zhuge Zhan =

Shu Han general and official (227-263)

- 諸葛瞻
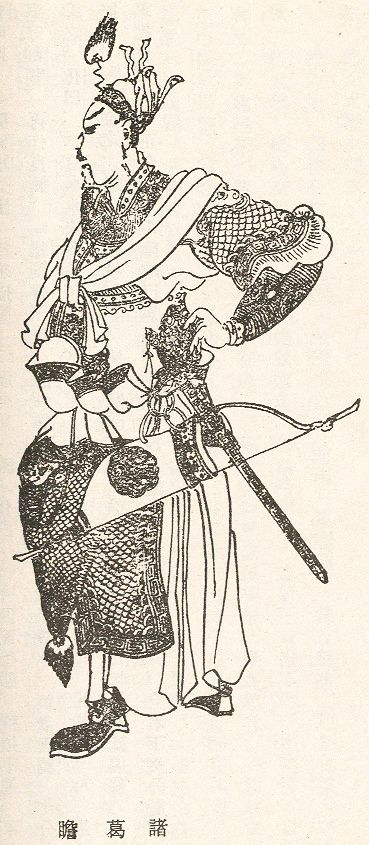
- A Qing dynasty illustration of Zhuge Zhan

General of the Guards (衛將軍) (acting)
- In office 261 – 263
- Monarch: Liu Shan

Protector-General (都護) (acting)
- In office 261 – 263
- Monarch: Liu Shan

Military Adviser-General (軍師將軍)
- In office ?–?
- Monarch: Liu Shan

Supervisor of the Masters of Writing (尚書僕射)
- In office ?–?
- Monarch: Liu Shan

Personal details
- Born: 227 (Note: Zhuge Zhan's biography in the Sanguozhi recorded that he died in the winter (10th to 12th month) of the 6th year of the Jingyao era of Liu Shan's reign, corresponding to 19 Nov 263 to 14 Feb 264 in the Julian calendar. However, Zhuge Zhan died before Shu's surrender. Thus, he likely died in late Nov or early Dec 263. He was 37 years old (by East Asian age reckoning) when he died. By calculation, his year of birth year should be 227.) Chengdu, Sichuan
- Died: c.November 263 (aged 36) Mianzhu, Sichuan
- Spouse: Liu Shan's daughter
- Children: Zhuge Shang Zhuge Jing
- Parent: Zhuge Liang (father)
- Occupation: Military general, politician
- Courtesy name: Siyuan (思遠)
- Peerage: Marquis of Wu District (武鄉侯)

Zhuge Zhan (227 – c. November 263), courtesy name Siyuan, was a Chinese military general and politician of the state of Shu Han during the Three Kingdoms period of China. He was a son of Zhuge Liang, the first Imperial Chancellor of Shu.

== Early life ==
When Zhuge Zhan was 16 years old, he married a Shu princess (a daughter of the Shu emperor Liu Shan) and was appointed as a Cavalry Commandant (騎都尉). One year later, he was promoted to a General of the Household (中郎將) in the Yulin (羽林) unit of the Imperial Guards. He subsequently held the following positions in the Shu government: Palace Attendant, Supervisor of the Masters of Writing (尚書僕射) and Military Adviser-General (軍師將軍).

Apart from serving as an official, Zhuge Zhan was also skilled in painting and calligraphy. Since the people of Shu deeply missed Zhuge Liang, who died in 234, they especially liked Zhuge Zhan for his talents because he reminded them of his father. Whenever the Shu government implemented a favourable policy, the people give credit to Zhuge Zhan even though it might have had nothing to do with him. As Zhuge Liang never established any formal history bureau in the Shu government, it was hard to distinguish which policies Zhuge Zhan had a role in, although it was clear that Zhuge Zhan's reputation was greater than his actual accomplishments.

== Pinnacle of power ==
Zhuge Zhan's frequent promotions continued until he reached the top of the imperial administrative system – the role of the Imperial Secretariat. At the same time, Zhuge Zhan was appointed as acting Protector-General (都護) and acting General of the Guards (衛將軍).

Having seen his father adopt an aggressive foreign policy towards Shu's rival state Cao Wei in the form of five military campaigns between 228 and 234, Zhuge Zhan recognised the inherent dangers of overly using military force, especially for Shu since it was far weaker than Wei in terms of military and economic power. After Jiang Wei became the de facto overall commander of the Shu army, Zhuge Zhan attempted to dissuade him from continuing to wage war against Wei but to no avail – Jiang Wei launched a total of 11 military campaigns against Wei between 240 and 262. After Jiang Wei suffered a crushing defeat at the hands of Wei forces, Zhuge Zhan wrote to the Shu emperor Liu Shan, asking him to remove Jiang Wei from his military command and replace him with Yan Yu, a friend of the eunuch Huang Hao. Zhuge Zhan's memorial to Liu Shan was preserved and was still available by the time of the Jin dynasty. However, it is not known whether Liu Shan heeded Zhuge Zhan's advice, because Jiang Wei did not return to the Shu capital, Chengdu, after his failure in the last of the 11 campaigns, presumably because he knew that the people of Shu were increasingly resentful of him. Liu Shan also compromised Zhuge Zhan's proposal to switch from an offensive stance against Wei to a defensive one, because he had earlier replaced Wei Yan's tried-and-tested defensive layout with a high-risk-high-reward strategy by Jiang Wei.

Previously, the Shu general Wei Yan had invented a defensive strategy to hinder and repel invading forces by setting up "covering camps" on the outskirts and exits of trails leading to Hanzhong Commandery, a strategic location on the road into the Shu heartland. Even after Wei Yan's death, Liu Shan had followed this arrangement, which allowed the Shu forces to successfully keep Wei invaders out every time. However, Jiang Wei argued that Wei Yan's design "could only repel the enemy but not reap big profits." Hoping to score a decisive victory, Jiang Wei proposed to abandon the camps set up by Wei Yan and vacate all the passes in the Qin Mountains, so an invading Wei army could be lured deeper into Hanzhong Commandery, where the weary expedition force could be blocked and rendered vulnerable to a Shu counterattack upon retreat. Jiang Wei claimed his arrangement could achieve a decisive victory previously unimaginable when they had just defended along the Qin Mountains. Since Jiang Wei's analysis had sound logic and merit, Zhuge Zhan did not oppose dismantling Wei Yan's intertwined fortifications.

== Futile effort to defend Shu ==
In early 263, Jiang Wei requested reinforcements from Chengdu after he heard that the Wei government had put the general Zhong Hui in charge of military affairs along the Wei–Shu border. However, Liu Shan believed in Huang Hao's witchcraft, according to which destiny dictated that Wei would not attack. Liu Shan did not inform Zhuge Zhan of Jiang Wei's warnings. Nevertheless, Liu Shan did send reinforcements before the Wei invasion commenced.

When the Wei forces started advancing towards Shu in September 263, the first half of Jiang Wei's plan worked – the Wei forces marched unopposed until they reached Han (漢; in present-day Mian County, Shaanxi) and Yue (樂; in present-day Chenggu County, Shaanxi) counties, which served as bait to wear out the enemy. However, Zhong Hui sent two smaller detachments to attack the two counties and led the main Wei army further into Shu territory. In the meantime, Jiang Wei lost to the Wei generals Wang Qi (王欣) and Yang Xin (楊欣) and had to retreat to the highly fortified mountain pass at Jiange (劍閣; in present-day Jiange County, Sichuan). Upon learning that Jiang Wei's plan had failed and sown the seeds of destruction, Zhuge Zhan hastily assembled an army in Chengdu and moved to Fu County to prepare for a final defence.

=== Battles with Deng Ai, and death ===
The aforementioned military movements happened within weeks, and Zhong Hui's rapid advance shocked most of the Shu generals. As they realised the danger of letting the enemy in, Jiang Wei and his comrades were still stuck at Jiange. As he knew that Jiange was well-defended, Zhuge Zhan did not send reinforcements there and instead held his position in Fu County. When the Wei general Deng Ai suddenly appeared in Jiangyou (江由) with his troops after taking a dangerous shortcut across mountainous terrain, the official in charge of Jiangyou surrendered without putting up a fight. Huang Chong, a son of Huang Quan, had urged Zhuge Zhan on numerous occasions to move quickly and seize control of advantageous terrain before Deng Ai did. Zhuge Zhan, however, deemed Huang Chong's plan too ambitious and adopted a more "cautious" approach instead. When Huang Chong repeatedly urged him to attack Deng Ai, Zhuge Zhan relented and tentatively sent a vanguard force to attack the enemy, which defeated them. Zhuge Zhan then left Fu County for the better fortified Mianzhu, where he planned to make a last stand against Deng Ai.

When Deng Ai besieged Zhuge Zhan at Mianzhu, he offered the latter a chance to surrender and promised to recommend to the Wei government to enfeoff Zhuge Zhan as the Prince of Langye if he surrendered. However, Zhuge Zhan refused, had Deng Ai's messenger executed, and ordered his troops to prepare for battle outside the pass. He supposedly arranged his troops in the Eight Trigrams Formation invented by his father. At the time, there were other notable Shu figures with Zhuge Zhan at Mianzhu, including Zhang Zun (張遵; a grandson of Zhang Fei), Li Qiu (李球; an imperial guard commander), Huang Chong, as well as Zhuge Zhan's eldest son Zhuge Shang. After Huang Chong gave a speech to the Shu soldiers to boost their morale, both sides engaged in battle. Deng Ai ordered his son Deng Zhong (鄧忠) and another officer Shi Zuan (師纂) to flank Zhuge Zhan's position. They moved to the formation's left and right but the Shu forces intercepted them and drove them back; only Deng Ai's central force remained intact. When Deng Zhong and Shi Zuan complained that there was no way to break the formation and suggested that they retreat, Deng Ai angrily said that they must win if they wanted to live another day, and even threatened to execute anyone who spoke of retreat. Deng Zhong and Shi Zuan then led their men to attack the Shu formation again and succeeded in breaking it. Zhuge Zhan, Zhuge Shang, Zhang Zun, Li Qiu, Huang Chong and other Shu officers were killed in action.

== In Romance of the Three Kingdoms ==
In the 14th-century historical novel Romance of the Three Kingdoms, which romanticises the events before and during the Three Kingdoms period, the writer Luo Guanzhong depicts the ill-fated defence of Chengdu in a dramatic fashion. When the Shu emperor Liu Shan sought Zhuge Zhan's opinion on how to drive the Wei invaders, Zhuge Zhan thought of dressing up as his deceased father to scare away the enemy. His ruse worked initially as the Wei soldiers panicked and scattered upon thinking that Zhuge Liang had returned from the dead. However, Deng Ai quickly pointed out that it was someone pretending to be Zhuge Liang and ordered his troops to regroup and attack. Zhuge Zhan died at the Battle of Mianzhu along with his eldest son Zhuge Shang, Huang Chong and others while helplessly outnumbered by Deng Ai's forces.

== See also ==
- Lists of people of the Three Kingdoms
