= Giorgio Valla =

Italian mathematician, philologist and translator (1447–1500)

Giorgio Valla (Latin: Georgius Valla; 1447 – January 23, 1500) was an Italian academic, mathematician, philologist and translator.

== Life ==
He was born in Piacenza in 1447. He was the son of Andrea Valla and Cornelia Corvini. At the age of fifteen Giorgio Valla moved to Milan, where he was educated by the famous Neoplatonic Hellenist Constantine Lascaris. Among his works is a Latin translation of the Hieroglyphica of Horapollo and Aristarchus's On the Sizes and Distances (1488). The De expetendis et fugiendis rebus is the most valuable work produced by Valla.

He lectured in physics and in medicine at Pavia and Venice. His magnum opus included Boethian arithmetic and music, and Euclidean geometry, law and rhetoric, among other matters.

In 1496, he was arrested for 8 months due to suspicions of conspiring with persons of the Trivulzio family who were allied with the king of France, Charles VIII. He died in Venice.

== Works ==
=== Treatises ===
- De orthographia (1495), Vienna.
- De expedita ratione argumentandi (1498; also Basel, 1529).
- Logica (1498), Venice.
- De simplicium natura (1528) Strassburg (on pharmacology).
- Georgii Vallae Placentini viri class. De expetendis et fugiendis rebus (1501, 40 books in 2 vols.), pr. Aldus Manutius, Venice.

=== Commentaries, critical editions and translations ===
- Hori Apollinis Niliaci Hieroglyphica, per Georgium Vallam in latinum translata, ms. Vat. lat. 3898.
- Problemata Alexandri Aphrodisei, per Georgium Vallam in latinum translata, Venice: Antonio de Strada, 1488.
- Galeni introductorium ad medicinam Georgio Valla interprete (1491), pr. Bartholomaeus de Zanis, Venice.
- Opus magnorum moralium Aristotelis (1522), with Latin translation by Girardo Ruffo Vaccariensi, Paris.
- Juvenalis cum tribus commentariis (1485, repr. 1495), Venice.
- M. Tullii Ciceronis epistolae familiares (1505), Lyons.
- Preface to the Commentary on Juvenal of Antonio Mancinelli (1494), Venice.
