= Lyu Jian =

Chinese University President

past President of Nanjing University
- In office 2018–2023
- Succeeded by: TAN Zhemin

Personal details
- Born: 1960 (age 65–66) Nanjing
- Education: Nanjing University
- Profession: Academic
- Scientific career
- Education: Nanjing University
- Known for: Computer software
- Fields: Computer Science
- Workplaces: Nanjing University

Lyu Jian (also known as "Lu Jian") was President of Nanjing University, China from 2018-2023, and is a professor in Computer Science.

== Early life ==
Lyu Jian was born in Nanjing, Jiangsu Province, China, in 1960. He studied Computer Science at Nanjing University and received his bachelor's degree in 1983, master's degree in 1984, and Ph.D. in 1988.

== Career ==
After his Ph.D., he joined Nanjing University as an assistant professor. He went to Manchester University, UK, as a visiting scholar from 1993 - 1994. In 2010, he became vice president of Nanjing University. In 2018, he was appointed President of the university.

== Research ==
Lyu Jian has performed research in computer software, software methodology, network software, agent technology, middleware, pervasive computing, software collaboration technology, and web security. He has given research seminars at various universities.

== Awards ==
Lyu Jian received the Natural Science award and the Technological Invention award from the Ministry of Education, China. In 2013, he was elected as a member of the Chinese Academy of Sciences.
