= Changchun Institute of Technology =

Public undergraduate college in Changchun, Jilin, China

- 长春工程学院
- Motto: 明德致远、笃行务实、自强不息、追求卓越
- Type: Public
- Established: 1951
- President: Hu Ming (胡明)
- Location: Changchun, Jilin, China
- Website: ccit.edu.cn

The Changchun Institute of Technology (CCIT; 长春工程学院) is a provincial public undergraduate college in Changchun, Jilin, China. It was founded in 1951.

== Overview ==
The Changchun Institute of Technology offers degrees in management, business, and the humanities. CIT is affiliated with the Jilin Provincial Government and recognized by the Jilin Province Academic Degrees Committee. CIT is further recognized by the Ministry of Education and has the power to grant bachelor and master degrees.

Including the School of Mechanical and Electrical Engineering, the School of Electronics and Information Engineering and the School of Continuing Education CIT has 20 schools and offers, with a main focus on electrical engineering and automation, civil engineering and resource exploration, altogether 54 professional courses.

Changchun Institute of Technology has enrolled international students from 13 countries.

== Schools and colleges ==
- School of Electrical and Information Engineering (SEIE)
- School of Civil Engineering
- School of Prospecting and Surveying Engineering
- School of Mechanical and Electrical Engineering
- School of Water Conservancy & Environment Engineering
- School of Energy and Power Engineering
- School of Management
- School of Architecture and Design
- School of Science
- School of Foreign Languages
- School of Computer Technology and Engineering
- School of International Education
