= Liutie =

Leishu

Baikong liutie (Chinese: 白孔六帖; pinyin: Bái-Kǒng liùtiē), also written as Bokong liutie, or known as Baishi liutie (Chinese: 白氏六帖), is a Chinese leishu (encyclopedia) known under various titles, often abbreviated simply as Liutie (Chinese: 六帖; pinyin: Liùtiē). It has a long and complex textual history extending from the Tang dynasty to the Song dynasty.

The work is also known as Tang-Song Bai-Kong liutie (唐宋白孔六帖; “Master Bai's categorised matters of the Classics and of historiography in six tablets”), as well as by several other variant titles and abbreviations.

Tang-Song Bai-Kong liutie 唐宋白孔六帖 (juan 31)

== History ==
The Baishi liutie (白氏六帖; “Master Bai’s Six Posts”) consists of thirty juan (scrolls). It is also known as Baishi jingshi shilei liutie (白氏经史事类六帖; “Master Bai’s Categorized Matters from the Classics and Histories in Six Posts”). It was compiled by Bai Juyi (白居易; 772–846), a Chinese poet of the Tang dynasty.

During the Song dynasty, Kong Chuan (孔传; 12th century) added a further thirty juan, known as the Hou liutie (后六帖; “Later Liutie”). The two works were subsequently combined into a single compilation.

The structure of the book is somewhat similar to that of the Beitang shuchao 北堂书钞. Since the Song dynasty, editions both with and without commentary (zhu) have circulated. Chao Gongwu (晁公武; 1101–1180) claimed that the commentary was written by his great-grandfather.

The work is also referred to simply as Liutie (六帖), short for Baishi liutie (白氏六帖), or as Baitie (白帖), or Bai-Kong liutie (白孔六帖).

In the Siku quanshu zongmu tiyao, the annotated comprehensive catalogue of the Siku quanshu, the Liutie is mentioned in a comparison of Tang dynasty leishu with the Chuxue ji:

「在唐人类书中，博不及《艺文类聚》，而精则胜之，若《北堂书钞》及《六帖》，则出此书之下远矣。」

(roughly translated:)

Among the leishu (encyclopedias) of the Tang dynasty, it [= the Chuxue ji] is not as rich (bo) as the Yiwen leiju, but it is superior in essence (jing); Beitang shuchao and Liutie fall far short in comparison.

Although judged less comprehensive than some contemporaneous compilations, many of the references preserved in the Liutie derive from materials and works that are otherwise lost. For this reason, it is considered to be of high documentary value. In Chinese textual criticism, it is frequently consulted for purposes of comparison and verification.

It is regarded as a one of the classical texts relevant to the Zhuangzi.

== See also ==
- Leishu

== Editions and literature ==
Editions

- Bai Juyi: Bai-Kong liutie 白孔六帖 (Siku quanshu edition)
- Bai Juyi: Baishi liutie shilei ji 白氏六帖事類集. Edited by Zhang Qinbo 张芹伯 (1933).

Reference works

- Li Xueqin and Lü Wenyu (eds.): Siku da cidian 四庫大辭典 (2 vols.). Changchun: Jilin daxue chubanshe 1996
- Ciyuan (Beijing 1990; first published 1979), four-volume edition (abbreviated CY)
