= Xu Jian (engineer) =

Chinese engineer

- 徐建
- Born: August 1958 (age 68); Liaoning, China
- Education: Changchun Institute of Technology; Hunan University
- Scientific career
- Fields: Civil engineering
- Workplaces: China National Machinery Industry Corporation

Xu Jian (Chinese: 徐建; pinyin: Xú Jiàn; born August 1958) is a Chinese civil engineer and currently general manager of the China National Machinery Industry Corporation. He is a member of the China Association for Engineering Construction Standardization (CECS), China Engineering and Consulting Association (CECA), Architectural Society of China (ASC), and China National Association of Engineering Consultants (CNAEC).

== Biography ==
Xu was born in Liaoning, in August 1958. In 1985 he graduated from Changchun Architecture College (now Changchun Institute of Technology), majoring in industrial and civil architecture. In 1988 he earned his master's degree in civil engineering from Hunan University. He studied at Xi'an University of Architecture and Technology for a year.

After graduation, he was assigned to the Designing and Research Institute of the Ministry of Machinery Industry, where he successively served as assistant engineer, director engineer, senior engineer, vice-president, and president. In August 2001 he became the deputy general manager of the China National Machinery Industry Corporation, rising to general manager in December 2007.

== Honours and awards ==
- 2014 State Science and Technology Progress Award (Second Class)
- January 8, 2018 State Science and Technology Progress Award (Second Class)
- November 22, 2019 Member of the Chinese Academy of Engineering (CAE)
