= Jian Wang (contemporary painter) =

Jian Wang (王健; born 1958) is a contemporary Chinese painter.

Wang was born in Dalian in 1958. A child drawn to art, Wang learned the Russian social realism popular in China, but spent his own time studying Rembrandt and Michelangelo. At the age of twelve, the quality of his artwork earned him admission in the Dalian Youth Palace Arts, where he studied for six years.

Urged by his parents, Wang got his Bachelor of Science in Engineering at the Dalian Railway Institute, where he later taught for four years. It was here that he met Marjorie Francisco, a retired art teacher from Sacramento, who taught English at the Institute. Impressed by his artwork, Marjorie sponsored Wang's journey to the United States so he could have the freedom to develop his own artistic voice.

In 1986, Wang arrived in the United States. He took art courses at Sacramento City College from Fred Dalkey. At University of California, he learned from Wayne Thiebaud, Manuel Neri, Roland Peterson and David Hallowell. Wang received his M.A. degree in 1994, at California State University, Sacramento, under the advisement of Oliver Jackson.

Wang currently works in California and in Beijing.
