= Jian Li (engineer) =

Chinese-American electrical engineer

Jian Li is a Chinese-American electrical engineer known for her research in signal processing, spectral density estimation, and MIMO radar, and for her books on engineering She is a professor of electrical and computer engineering at the University of Florida, where she directs the Spectral Analysis Laboratory.

== Education and career ==
Li is originally from China, where both of her parents are engineers; she followed them into engineering despite her father's wish for her to become a physician, and graduated in 1985 from Xidian University. She came to Ohio State University for graduate study in electrical engineering, earned a master's degree there in 1987, and completed her Ph.D. in 1991.

After completing her doctorate, she took at the position at the University of Kentucky before moving to the University of Florida two years later.

== Books ==
Li's books include:

- Radar Signal Processing and Its Applications (edited with R. Hummel, Peter Stoica, and E. G. Zelnio, Springer, 2003)
- Spectral Analysis of Signals: The Missing Data Case (with Yanwei Wang and Stoica, Morgan & Claypool, 2005)
- Robust Adaptive Beamforming (with Stoica, Wiley, 2005, Wiley)
- MIMO Radar Signal Processing (edited with Stoica, Wiley, 2009)
- Waveform Design for Active Sensing Systems: A Computational Approach (with Hao He and Stoica, Cambridge University Press, 2011)

== Recognition ==
Li was named a Fellow of the IEEE in 2005, "for contributions to adaptive beam forming, radar imaging, and target detection". She is also a Fellow of the Institution of Engineering and Technology.
