= Xu Jian (Tang dynasty) =

Tang Chinese author

Xu Jian (Chinese: 徐堅; 659–729), also known as Xu Yuangu, was a literary figure from the Tang dynasty. He is the author of "the Great Hidden Biography" and "the Beginning of Learning Records".

== Early life ==
According to The Old Book of the Tang Dynasty, Xu Jian was born into a family of officials in Changxing, Huzhou, in the fourth year of Xianqing (Ancient Chinese chronology) in the Tang dynasty. Xu Jian studied history and modern society.

Jian's father Xu Qidan was known for his literary attainments. His father was exiled to Qinzhou and died when Xu Jian was 14. He was the head of Qi Zhou prefecture. He died in 673 AD (the fourth year of Tang Xianheng), at the age of 43.

Xu Jian was raised by his grandmother Jiang. When Xu Jian was young, he met Li Xian (Empress Wu Zetian's sixth son) after he was summoned for an interview.

His grandfather Xu Xiao De was a minister in the Sui dynasty and Tang dynasty.

== Career ==
In 699 AD (the second year of the Holy Calendar), Xu Jian wrote "Three Religions Zhuying" with Liu Zhi Ji, Xu Yan Bo, and Zhang Shuo. In 703 AD (the third year of Chang 'an), together with Liu Zhi Ji and Wu Jing, he wrote and revised "The History of the Tang Dynasty", forming 80 volumes of the book under Wu Zetian's edict.

Four years later, in 707 AD (the third year of Shen 'long), Xu Jian, Wu Jing, Liu Zhi Ji and others revised the "Zhe Tian Shi Lu".

In 712 AD, Tang Xuanzong ascended the throne, changed Lizheng college into Jixian college and made Xu Jian the president and Shang Shuo the vice president. Xu was crowned King of the East China Sea. Thirteen year later, in 725 AD (13-year Kai Yuan), he was named Doctor Guanglu.

== Works ==
=== 初学记 (the Beginning of Learning Records) ===
初学记. The book was composed of 30 volumes. This book was divided into twenty-four parts, which include 赋, 诗, 颂, 讃, 箴, 铭, 论, 书, 祭文 and other different styles of poetry. In general, this is a collection of poems for learning poetry.

=== Xu's poetry ===
《相和歌辞·棹歌行》

棹女饰银钩，新妆下翠楼。 Rowing girl, wearing silver jewellery and new and beautiful makeup, is walking out of the house.

霜丝青桂楫，兰枻紫霞舟。 The quant is as clear as frost, and the hull was made of rosy wood.

水落金陵曙，风起洞庭秋。 The dawn is shining on the river in Jinling, and the breeze brings the autumn flavour of Dongting Lake.

扣船过曲浦，飞帆越回流。 She paddled the boat through tiny waves and past flowing water.

影入桃花浪，香飘杜若洲。 The boat's shadow was reflected on the peach-blossom water, and the scent of flowers filled the whole lake.

洲长殊未返，萧散云霞晚。 After a long time she did not come back, the horizon is purple sunset.

日下大江平，烟生归岸远。 The setting sun had disappeared into the lake, and smoke from cooking was rising from the shore.

岸远闻潮波，争途游戏多。 The shore could hear the waves of the distant quant and the beautiful singing of the girl.

因声赵津女，来听采菱歌。 People on the shore were drawn to hear her ethereal singing.

== Legacy ==
Xu Jian used his philosophy to manage the Royal Academy and the Royal College. He expanded the education of the Tang dynasty during the reign of Xuanzong.

In literature, the Old Book of Tang and other works he edited form the core of the literature of the Tang Dynasty.
