= Wang Jian (computer scientist) =

Chinese computer scientist

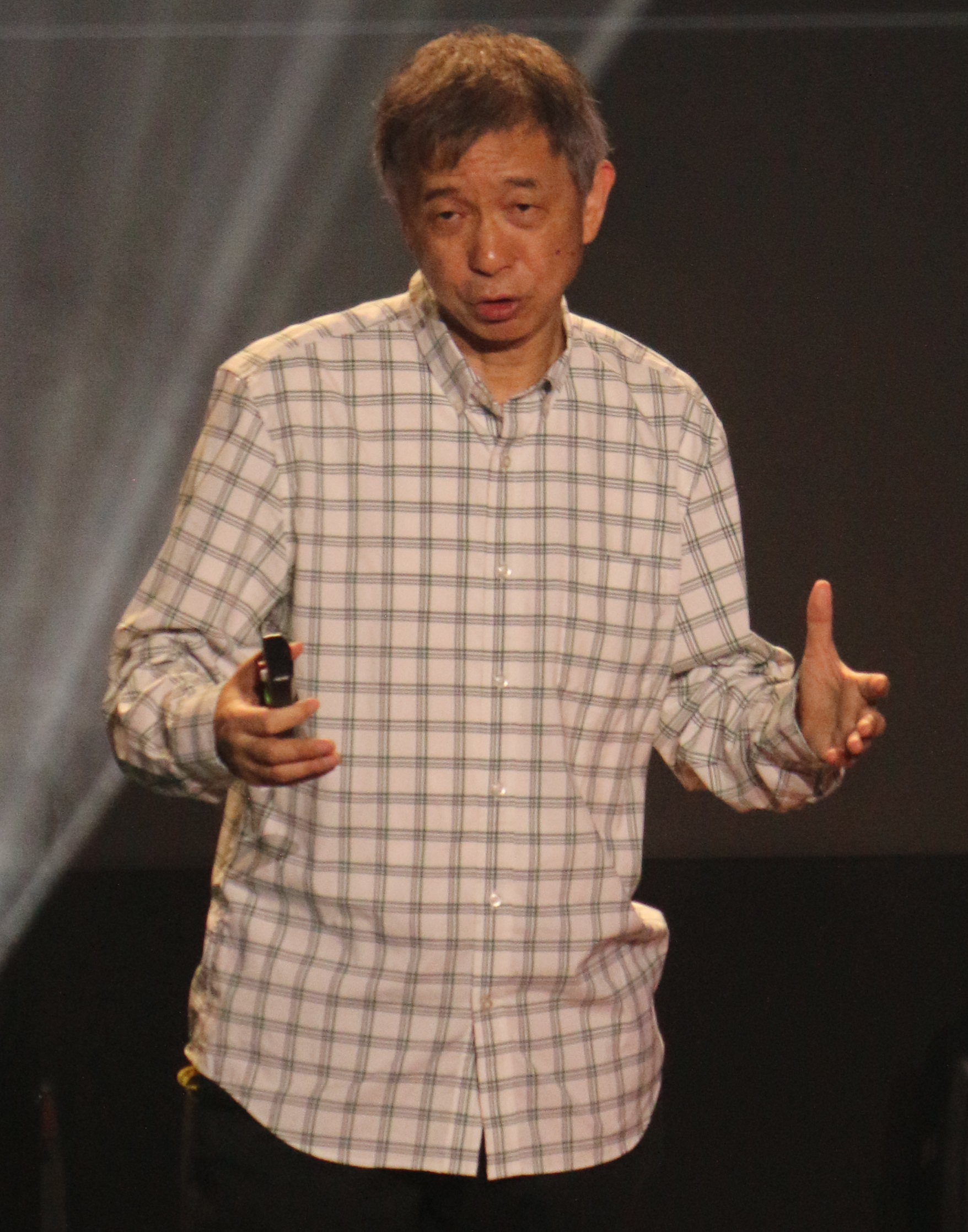
- Wang in 2025
- Born: October 1962 (age 63–64); China
- Education: Hangzhou University
- Scientific career
- Fields: Computer science
- Workplaces: Alibaba Group

Chinese name
- Traditional Chinese: 王堅
- Simplified Chinese: 王坚
Transcriptions
Standard Mandarin
- Hanyu Pinyin: Wáng Jiān

Wang Jian (Chinese: 王坚; born October 1962) is a Chinese computer scientist currently serving as chief technology officer of Alibaba Group. He is an editor of Communications of the ACM.

== Biography ==
Wang was born in October 1962. He received his bachelor's degree and doctor's degree from Hangzhou University in 1984 and 1990, respectively. After graduating, he joined the faculty of the university and was promoted to professor in 1992. He was director of Department of Psychology between 1994 and 1998. In 1996 he was a visiting professor at New York State University. In 1999 he joined the Microsoft Research Asia. In September 2008 he was offered a position as chief architect of Alibaba Group. In August 2012 he became chief technology officer. In October 2019, Hurun Report listed him as the 1008th richest person in China with an estimated wealth of 4.1 billion yuan. In 2016, Wang Jian stepped down as chief technology officer and was replaced by Jeff Zhang. Jeff Zhang replaced Jian Wang but Jian Wang continued as the chairman of Alibaba's technology committee. In his new role, Zhang led the group's strategy in technology execution and security. Zhang had joined the company in 2004 and is one of Alibaba's partners. He was also the chief architect of Taobao and has made contribution to projects across many business units including Alibaba's e-commerce sites like 1688.In 2023, he returned to Alibaba Group Holding as a full-time staffer and took an important role in Alibaba's cloud operations.After Wang Jian took an essential role in the cloud business for Alibaba, it was expected that top leadership and Wang's comeback would accelerate Alibaba's focus on cloud technology. Jian's addition to Alibaba Cloud was a response to Alibaba Cloud's slowing growth and competition from other companies. Revenue fell sharply from 92.5% in 2018 to 7.3% in 2022, but still remained China and Asia's largest cloud provider. Cloud technology now became a central part of Alibaba's overall growth strategy and restructuring plans.

== Honours and awards ==
- November 22, 2019 Member of the Chinese Academy of Engineering (CAE)
