= Chen Jian (politician, born 1961) =

Chinese politician

- 陈坚

Communist Party Secretary of Dali Bai Autonomous Prefecture
- In office January 2017 – April 2021
- Governor: Yang Jian
- Preceded by: Yang Ning
- Succeeded by: Yang Guozong

Personal details
- Born: June 1961 (age 65) Kunming, Yunnan, China
- Party: Chinese Communist Party (1988–2023; expelled)

Chinese name
- Simplified Chinese: 陈坚
- Traditional Chinese: 陳堅
Transcriptions
Standard Mandarin
- Hanyu Pinyin: Chén Jiān

Chen Jian (Chinese: 陈坚; born June 1961) is a former Chinese politician. He was investigated by China's top anti-graft agency in April 2022. Previously he served as a counsellor of Yunnan Provincial People's Government and before that, party secretary of Dali.

== Biography ==
Chen was born in Kunming, Yunnan, in June 1961. He worked in Kunming Survey and Design Institute between August 1982 and October 1997. He joined the Chinese Communist Party (CCP) in June 1988. Beginning in October 1997, he served in several posts in Yunnan Development Investment Co., Ltd., including deputy manager, manager, and manager of investment department. In November 2001, he was assigned to the Yunnan Provincial Water Resources Department, where he eventually became its head. In January 2017, he was appointed party secretary of Dali Bai Autonomous Prefecture, and held that office until April 2021. He became a counsellor of Yunnan Provincial People's Government in April 2021, and served until April 2022.

=== Downfall ===
On 7 April 2022, he has been placed under investigation for "serious violations of discipline and laws" by the Central Commission for Discipline Inspection (CCDI), the party's internal disciplinary body, and the National Supervisory Commission, the highest anti-corruption agency of China.

On 16 February 2023, Chen was stripped of his posts within the CCP and in the public office.

Government offices
Preceded by Zhou Yunlong (周运龙)	Director of the Yunnan Provincial Water Resources Department; 2013–2017	Succeeded by Liu Gang (刘刚)
Party political offices
Preceded by Yang Ning	Communist Party Secretary of Dali Bai Autonomous Prefecture; 2017–2021	Succeeded by Yang Guozong
