= Liu Jian (Volkswagen) =

Liu Jian (刘坚) was the head of Shanghai Volkswagen, a joint venture with Volkswagen and the largest producer of cars in China. He was killed during a test drive in China on July 19, 2010. Four others were killed in the crash.

In 2008, Liu introduced the concept of renewable resources to the manufacture of cars in China and worked to make Volkswagen the official vehicle of the 2008 Beijing Olympic Games.
