= Sun Jian (politician) =

Chinese politician (1936–1997)

- 孙健

Vice Premier of China
- In office January 1975 – Spring 1978
- Premier: Zhou Enlai→Hua Guofeng

Personal details
- Born: 1936 Dingxing County, Hebei, China
- Died: November 1997 (aged 61) Tianjin, China
- Party: Chinese Communist Party
- Spouse: Pang Xiuting

Sun Jian (Chinese: 孙健; Wade–Giles: Sun Chien; 1936 – November 1997) was a Chinese factory worker who was elevated to the position of Vice Premier in 1975, during the Cultural Revolution. After the end of the Cultural Revolution, he was declared a follower of the Gang of Four and was dismissed from the government in 1978. He returned to his former life as a factory worker in Tianjin and later became a company manager.

== Biography ==
Sun Jian was born 1936 in rural Dingxing County, Hebei Province. In 1951, he became a worker at the Tianjin Internal Combustion Engine Factory. Starting at the bottom, he was known as a hard worker and rose through the ranks, eventually becoming the party secretary of the factory.

During the Cultural Revolution, he was elevated to the Tianjin Municipal Bureau of Machinery to serve as vice-director of its Revolutionary Committee in charge of production, and then promoted to (deputy) party secretary of Tianjin in charge of industry.

At the 4th National People's Congress in January 1975, Sun, aged 39, was elected as a Vice Premier of the State Council, together with fellow model worker Wu Guixian and peasant leader Chen Yonggui. Sun was made responsible for industrial production, and also became an alternate member of the 10th Central Committee of the Chinese Communist Party.

The Cultural Revolution ended in 1976 following Mao Zedong's death, and the radical Gang of Four was arrested. Sun stayed in his position for two more years, but was declared a follower of the Gang of Four and purged in the spring of 1978.

Sun was sent back to Tianjin, where he underwent "supervised reformation" at the Tianjin Machinery Factory. When his wife Pang Xiuting (庞秀婷) was allowed to visit him, he promised her that he would not kill himself. He returned to his old life as a factory worker, although he was now a centre of attention for being a former vice-premier. In 1985, the national government gave permission for his promotion to a middle-management position, and Sun was put in charge of a US$5 million German investment in a motorcycle production line in Tianjin. He was later appointed as manager of a state-owned machinery company in the Tianjin Economic-Technological Development Area (TEDA).

In November 1997, Sun died from lung cancer in Tianjin, at the age of 61.
