= Fan Jian (officer) =

Chinese government accountant

Fan Jian (Chinese: 范坚; born December 1960) is a Chinese government accountant. He was demoted in 2016 for violating party discipline. He was born in Huaining County, Anhui. He has a Master of Business Administration (MBA). For unknown reasons, Fan was recorded as having begun work at age 29, in 1989, unusually old. He served as a collections agent for the Anhui provincial tax agency. He then joined the national tax bureau and worked on regulations for tax collections, where he ascended to the height of his career. He was named the Chief Accountant of the National Tax Bureau in October 2012, then Chief Economist in October 2014 (and a member of the party leading group). He was abruptly demoted to a fuchuji "non-leading" position in 2016 because he was said to have violated party discipline, although the Central Commission for Discipline Inspection did not elaborate on what the offenses were.
