= Jian Sun (researcher) =

Chinese-born electronics researcher

Jian Sun from the Rensselaer Polytechnic Institute (RPI), Troy, NY was named Fellow of the Institute of Electrical and Electronics Engineers (IEEE) in 2015 for contributions to modeling and control of power electronic circuits and systems.
