= He Jian (politician, born 1965) =

Chinese politician

- 何健

Chairman of Zhongwei People's Congress
- In office January 2000 – December 2021
- Preceded by: Zhang Zhu
- Succeeded by: Zhang Li

Communist Party Secretary of Zhongwei
- In office June 2017 – December 2021
- Mayor: Li Xiaobo; Ma Honghai
- Preceded by: Zhang Zhu
- Succeeded by: Zhang Li

Personal details
- Born: October 1965 (age 60–61) Nantong, Jiangsu, China
- Party: Chinese Communist Party
- Education: Shenyang Polytechnic Higher Vocational College; Central Party School of the Chinese Communist Party

He Jian (Chinese: 何健; pinyin: Hé Jiàn; born October 1965) is a former Chinese politician who spent most of his career in northwest China's Ningxia Hui Autonomous Region. He was investigated by China's top anti-graft agency in December 2021. Previously he served as party secretary of Zhongwei and chairman of its People's Congress.

== Biography ==
He was born in Nantong, Jiangsu, in October 1965. In 1983, he was admitted to Shenyang Polytechnic Higher Vocational College, majoring in machine manufacturing. He joined the Chinese Communist Party in June 1985.

After graduation in 1987, he was assigned to Panzhihua Iron and Steel, the largest steel maker in Western China. In August 1997, he became an official of the Office of Organization Department of CCP Sichuan Provincial Committee, and was elevated to deputy director in May 2001. In September 2002, he was despatched to the Second Cadre Bureau of Organization Department of the Chinese Communist Party, and served until July 2013.

In April 2013, he became the deputy secretary-general of CCP Ningxia Regional Committee, rising to secretary-general in September 2015. In June 2017, he was promoted to party secretary of Zhongwei, concurrently serving as chairman of its People's Congress since January 2000.

=== Downfall ===
On 23 December 2021, he was put under investigation for alleged "serious violations of discipline and laws" by the Central Commission for Discipline Inspection (CCDI), the party's internal disciplinary body, and the National Supervisory Commission, the highest anti-corruption agency of China.

Party political offices
Preceded by Ji Zheng	Secretary-General of CCP Ningxia Regional Committee; 2015–2017	Succeeded by Ji Zheng
Preceded by Zhang Zhu	Communist Party Secretary of Zhongwei; 2017–2021	Succeeded by Zhang Li
Assembly seats
Preceded by Zhang Zhu	Chairman of Zhongwei People's Congress; 2000–2021	Succeeded by Zhang Li
