= Chen Jian (politician, born 1952) =

Chinese politician

- 陈健

Vice Minister, Chinese Ministry of Commerce
- In office April 2008 – June 2013
- Succeeded by: Fang Aiqing

Economic and Commercial Counsellor, Chinese Embassy in Argentina
- In office June 1992 – October 1994

Economic Counsellor, Chinese Embassy in Guinea-Bissau
- In office September 1980 – January 1986

Personal details
- Born: July 1952 (age 74) Xinchang, Zhejiang
- Education: Beijing Second Foreign Language University

Chen Jian (born July 1952) is the Chinese Vice Minister of Commerce. He began his career in May 1969 and joined the CPC in January 1976. He graduated from Beijing Second Foreign Language University majoring in Spanish, and holds the title of Senior International Business Engineer.

Chen served successively in the Department of Political Affairs of the Ministry of Economic Relations with Foreign Countries (MERFC), the Second Bureau of MERFC, the Economic Counselor’s Office of the Embassy of the People’s Republic of China in Guinea-Bissau, and the Department of Personnel and Education of the Ministry of Foreign Economic Relations and Trade. From 1992, he served as Economic and Commercial Counselor of the Embassy of the People’s Republic of China in Argentina. From 1994, he served successively as Assistant General Manager and Deputy General Manager of China National Overseas Engineering Corporation. In 1998, he was appointed Director General of the Department of Foreign Economic Cooperation of the Ministry of Foreign Trade and Economic Cooperation (MOFTEC).

In April 2008, Chen was appointed Vice Minister of Commerce and member of the CPC Leadership Group of MOFCOM. He oversees the Department of Outward Investment and International Cooperation, the Department of Asian Affairs, China International Contractors Association, China Association of International Engineering Consultants, China Association for International Economic Cooperation, and China International Council for the Promotion of Multinational Corporations.

In June 2013, Jiang Yaoping and Chen Jian were relieved of the posts of Vice Minister and member of the CPC Leadership Group of MOFCOM, succeeded by Gao Yan and Fang Aiqing.
