= Fan Jian (legal scholar) =

Chinese legal scholar and lawyer (born 1957)

Fan Jian (Chinese: 范健; born 1957) is a Chinese legal scholar and Professor at Nanjing University School of Law. He is a vice president of China Commercial Law Society and president of Jiangsu Commercial Law Society.

== Biography ==
Fan was born in 1957 in Nantong, Jiangsu, China.

He graduated from Nanjing University School of Law in 1988 with a master's degree, and then studied at the University of Göttingen from 1989 to 1991. From 2000 to 2001, he was a visiting scholar at Columbia University where he taught laws regarding commerce, corporate, economics, international trade, and security. He was commissioned by the Ministry of Education of the People's Republic of China to draft a syllabus for Chinese commercial law education and is known for his additions to Commercial Law textbook as well as publication of over 160 academic papers. He also served as a first chairman of the Commercial Law for Marxist Theory Engineering of the Ministry of Education textbook.

In 1995, Fan was named as one of China's ten distinguished young legal scholars. In 2017, China Today named him as one of the 100 most influential legal scholars in building the rule of law in the People's Republic of China.
