= Jian Liu (academic) =

Professor of pharmacy

Jian Liu (born December 20, 1962) is a John & Deborah S. McNeill Jr. Distinguished Professor at the UNC Eshelman School of Pharmacy, at the University of North Carolina at Chapel Hill. He is also a founder and the chief scientific officer at Glycan Therapeutics.

== Academic career ==
=== Education ===
Jian Liu received his bachelor's degree in chemistry and master's degree in biochemistry from Nankai University. He then moved to the University of Iowa in 1988 to obtain his PhD training in medicinal chemistry. After his PhD studies, he joined the Massachusetts Institute of Technology as a postdoctoral fellow in 1993.

=== Academic Work ===
Jian Liu started his independent scientific career as an assistant professor in chemical biology and medicinal chemistry at the University of North Carolina in 2000 and moved to the rank of full professor in 2012. His research interest is in the interface of chemistry and biology of heparin and heparan sulfate. His work covers the understanding of the biosynthetic mechanism of heparan sulfate biosynthesis and the development of heparan sulfate-based medicines. In his work at the Massachusetts Institute of Technology and the early period of his independent career at the University of North Carolina, he isolated the heparan sulfate 3-O-sulfotransferases that are key enzymes responsible for the biosynthesis of heparan sulfate with anticoagulant activity. He then led a research team to discover a chemoenzymatic method to prepare synthetic heparin, a drug to treat blood clotting disorders. He is also engaged in discovering new therapeutic potential of heparan sulfate and chondroitin sulfate through exploiting the anti-inflammatory effects of these molecules. His research team recently announced that a synthetic heparan sulfate 18-mer protects against acute liver injury caused by acetaminophen overdose. The team also discovered that a synthetic chondroitin sulfate E 19-mer attenuates multi-organ damage in endotoxemia mice. Jian Liu also participated in the effort organized by the US FDA and US Pharmacopeia to define the purity standards for heparin drugs. He served as a member of Unfractionated Heparins Ad Hoc Advisory Panel for US Pharmacopeia from 2010 to 2012.
