= Sun Jian (sport shooter) =

Chinese sport shooter (born 1991)

Personal information
- Nationality: Chinese
- Born: 23 October 1991 (age 34) Shanghai, China
- Height: 1.83 m (6 ft 0 in)
- Weight: 80 kg (176 lb)

Sport
- Country: China
- Sport: Shooting
- Event: Rifle
Medal record
World Championships
Bronze medal – third place	2018 Changwon	50 m team rifle prone

Sun Jian (simplified Chinese: 孙坚; traditional Chinese: 孫堅; pinyin: Sūn Jiān; born 23 October 1991) is a Chinese sport shooter.

He participated at the 2018 ISSF World Shooting Championships, winning a medal.
