= Huang Hao =

3rd century eunuch and official in Shu Han

- 黃皓

Commandant of Equippage (奉車都尉)
- In office 258 – 263
- Monarch: Liu Shan

Central Regular Attendant (中常侍)
- In office 258 – 263
- Monarch: Liu Shan

Assistant of the Yellow Gate (黃門丞)
- In office ? – 258
- Monarch: Liu Shan

Personal details
- Born: Unknown
- Died: Unknown
- Occupation: Eunuch, politician

Huang Hao (fl. 220s–263) was a Chinese eunuch and politician serving under Liu Shan (r. 223–263), the second and last emperor of the state of Shu Han in the Three Kingdoms period (220–280) of China. He gained the favour of Liu Shan and became highly influential. He was able to promote his supporters and demote those who opposed him to the overall detriment of the good governance of the state. When the leading Shu Han general Jiang Wei sought to warn the emperor that an invasion by Cao Wei was imminent, Huang Hao, who believed in sorcery, advised the emperor that such an invasion would not happen. As a result, the Shu Han state was not prepared for the Wei invasion of Shu forcing the emperor to surrender unconditionally in 263.

== Life ==
Huang Hao entered the Shu imperial palace sometime in the 220s as a eunuch attending to the Shu emperor Liu Shan, who favoured him because he was shrewd and full of flattering words. Whenever Huang Hao attempted to interfere in state affairs, Dong Yun, then the head of government, warned Liu Shan about the dangers of flattery and admonished Huang Hao for misleading the emperor. While Dong Yun was alive, he kept Huang Hao in check and never allowed him to be promoted beyond the position of an assistant of the Yellow Gate (黃門丞).

Following Dong Yun's death in c.December 246, Chen Zhi replaced him as the head of government and collaborated with Huang Hao to dominate the imperial court and state affairs. Liu Shan criticised the late Dong Yun for treating him with contempt; he was believed to have said this with the encouragement of Huang Hao and Chen Zhi. When Chen Zhi died in 258, Huang Hao became the most influential figure in the Shu central government based in Chengdu. Liu Shan promoted Huang Hao to the positions of Central Regular Attendant (中常侍) and Commandant of Equipage (奉車都尉).

Huang Hao abused his power by promoting officials who were his supporters and demoting those who stood up to him. When Luo Xian refused to work with him, Huang Hao had Luo Xian sent away from Chengdu to serve as the Administrator (太守) of Badong Commandery (巴東郡; around present-day Fengjie County, Chongqing). Yan Yu (閻宇), a close friend of Huang Hao who served as Area Commander of Badong (巴東都督) rereassigned Luo Xian as his deputy since he thought highly of him. Fan Jian, the Prefect of the Masters of Writing (尚書令), refused to have any dealings with Huang Hao. Huang Hao disliked Xi Zheng, an inner office official who was familiar with Huang Hao's dealings for about 30 years. Although he did not harm Xi Zheng, he never allowed Xi Zheng to get promoted. Liu Yong, a younger brother of Liu Shan, hated Huang Hao and was never on good terms with him. After Huang Hao came to power, he slandered and spoke ill of Liu Yong in front of Liu Shan, resulting in Liu Shan refusing to meet Liu Yong for more than 10 years.

In 262, the Shu general Jiang Wei wrote to Liu Shan to urge him to execute Huang Hao. However, Liu Shan refused, said that Huang Hao was merely a servant running errands for him, and told Jiang Wei not to be so upset with Huang Hao. Jiang Wei knew that Huang Hao had many supporters in the imperial court and was concerned that he might have fallen out of favour with the emperor when he asked Liu Shan to execute Huang Hao. Later, Liu Shan ordered Huang Hao to apologise to Jiang Wei. Jiang Wei found an excuse to leave Chengdu and move to a military garrison at Tazhong (沓中; northwest of present-day Zhugqu County, Gansu). In the meantime, Huang Hao tried to remove Jiang Wei from his command and replace him with Yan Yu (閻宇), Huang Hao's close friend. When Jiang Wei heard about it, he remained in Tazhong and refused to return to Chengdu as he knew that he would be safe in Tazhong.

In 263, Jiang Wei received news that Zhong Hui, a general from Shu's rival state Wei, was mobilising troops into the Guanzhong region, seemingly in preparation for an invasion of Shu. He then wrote to Liu Shan, requesting permission to set up defences against the impending invasion. Huang Hao, who believed in sorcery, got a witch doctor to predict the future. He then told Liu Shan that the witch doctor predicted that the Wei forces would not attack Shu, so there was no need to follow Jiang Wei's plan. Later that year, the Wei general Deng Ai led his troops through a shortcut across mountainous terrain, bypassing the Shu defences, and arrived outside Chengdu. Liu Shan surrendered without putting up a fight, thus bringing an end to the Shu regime's existence. After Liu Shan's surrender, Deng Ai heard that Huang Hao was a treacherous person and wanted to execute him, but Huang Hao had already bribed Deng Ai's men to release him and he escaped. His eventual fate is unknown.

== In Romance of the Three Kingdoms ==
In Chapter 119 of the 14th-century historical novel Romance of the Three Kingdoms, Huang Hao is publicly executed at the order of the Wei regent Sima Zhao when he followed Liu Shan to the Wei capital Luoyang.

== See also ==
- Lists of people of the Three Kingdoms
